= 2026 Kazakh legislative election =

- 23 August 2026

All 145 seats in the Kurultai 73 seats needed for a majority
- Opinion polls
- Registered: 12,623,289
- Turnout: 74.08% (▲19.87pp)
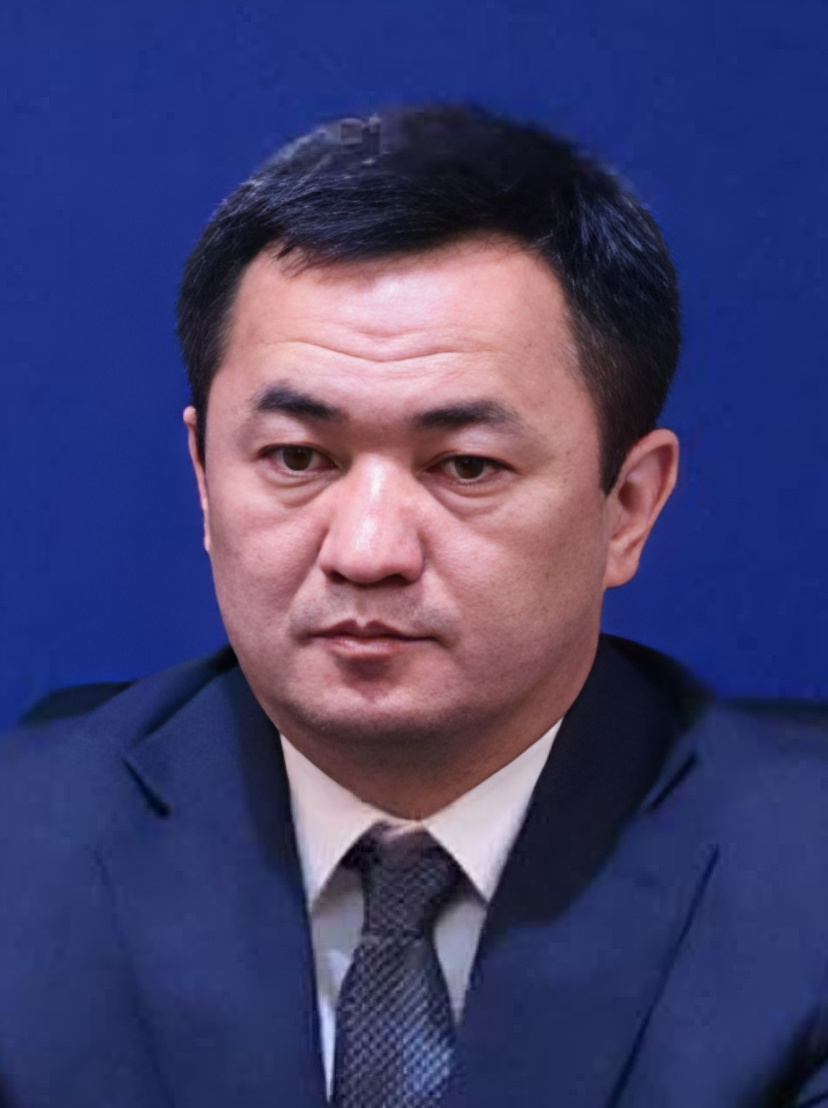

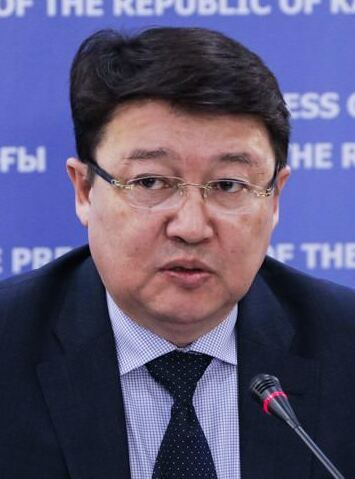

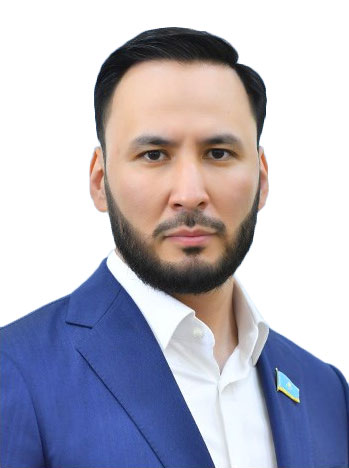

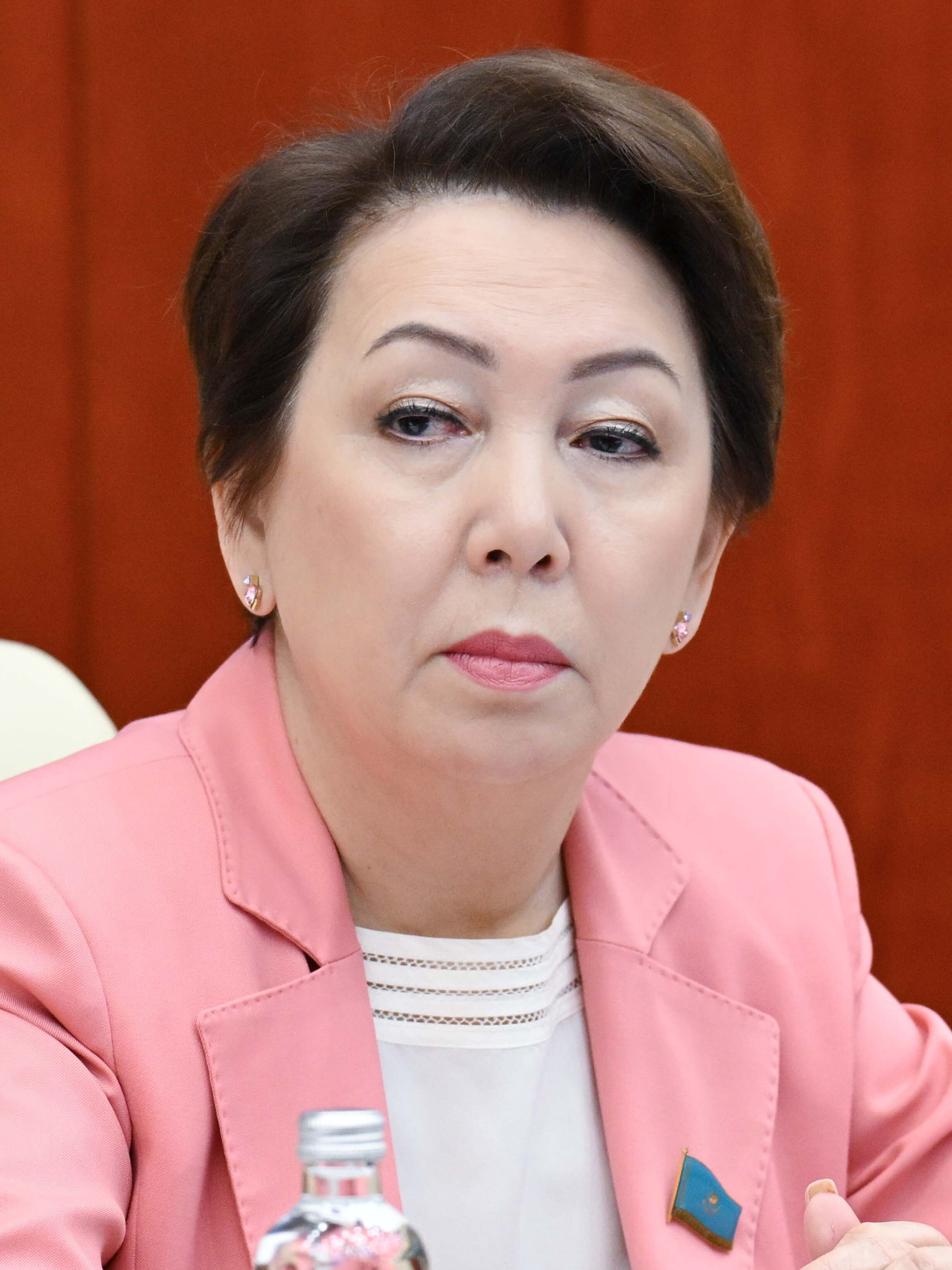

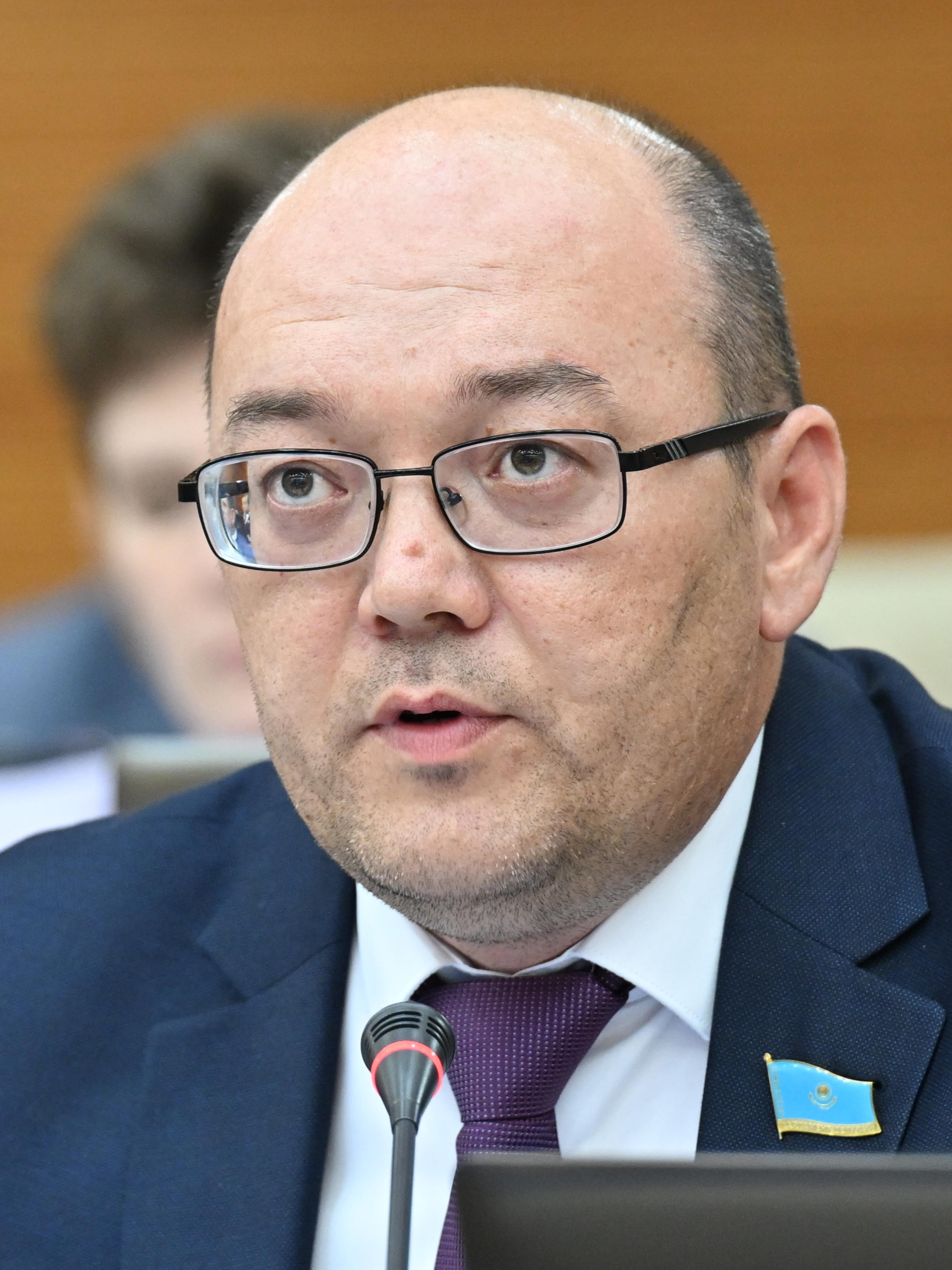
| | Majority party | Minority party | Third party |
|---|---|---|---|
| Leader | Aibek Dädebai | Qairat Aituğanov | Aidarbek Qojanazarov |
| Party | Adilet | Auyl | Respublica |
| Leader since | 7 May 2026 | 23 June 2026 | 6 December 2022 |
| Last election | New | 10.90%, 8 seats | 8.59%, 6 seats |
| Seats won | 110 | 10 | 9 |
| Seat change | New | ▲2 | ▲3 |
| Popular vote | 6,528,948 | 574,621 | 509,631 |
| Percentage | 71.17% | 6.26% | 5.56% |
| Swing | New | ▼4.64 pp | ▼3.03 pp |
| | Fourth party | Fifth party |
| Leader | Dania Espaeva | Ashat Raqymjanov |
| Party | Aq Jol | JSDP |
| Leader since | 13 June 2026 | 6 September 2019 |
| Last election | 8.41%, 6 seats | 5.20%, 4 seats |
| Seats won | 8 | 8 |
| Seat change | ▲2 | ▲4 |
| Popular vote | 478,083 | 469,058 |
| Percentage | 5.21% | 5.11% |
| Swing | ▼3.20 pp | ▼0.09 pp |
- Results by regions
Prime Minister before election
Oljas Bektenov
Independent
Elected Prime Minister
Oljas Bektenov
Independent

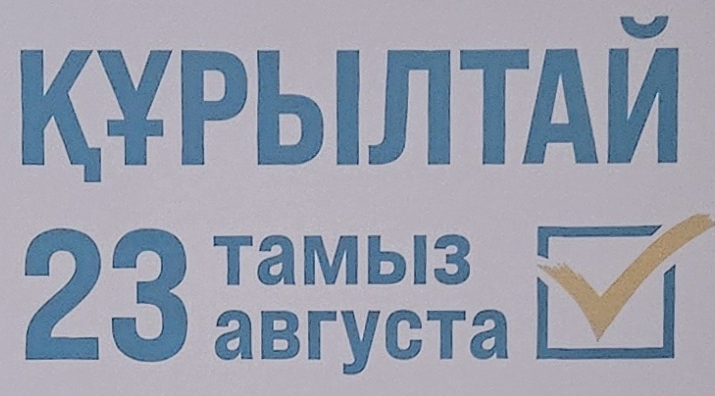
The bilingual official logo of the election

Legislative elections were held in Kazakhstan on 23 August 2026 to elect all 145 members of the Kurultai of the 1st convocation. It was the 10th legislative election since Kazakhstan's independence in 1991 and the first election to the country's new unicameral legislature established by the 2026 Constitution. Turnout was 74.2%, making it the highest turnout recorded in a national vote in Kazakhstan since the 2026 referendum and the highest turnout in a legislative election since 2016.

The new constitution, approved in a constitutional referendum, provided for the dissolution of the previous bicameral Parliament of Kazakhstan and established the Kurultai as the country's highest representative body. It entered into force on 1 July 2026, on which day President Kassym-Jomart Tokayev signed a decree calling the legislative election for 23 August. The vote also marked the return of party-list proportional representation under the new electoral system for the first time since the 2021 legislative elections.

The campaign was contested by seven political parties and focused primarily on socio-economic and governance issues. Major campaign issues included living standards, taxation and the minimum wage; inflation and the rising cost of essential goods; economic and industrial development, including regional growth and labour productivity; and the implementation of the new constitutional and parliamentary system.

Ahead of the election, press freedom organizations reported increasing pressure on independent journalists, including arrests, criminal investigations, travel bans and restrictions on journalistic activity. The Organization for Security and Co-operation in Europe said the elections were "technically well prepared" but took place in an environment lacking political pluralism, with limited political alternatives and restrictions on independent candidates, civil society and media.

The newly formed pro-presidential Ädilet party, the successor to Amanat, won the election with 71.2% of the vote, followed by the Auyl with 6.3%, Respublica with 5.6%, the Aq Jol with 5.2%, and the Nationwide Social Democratic Party (JSDP) with 5.1%. The People's Party of Kazakhstan (QHP) and Baytaq failed to reach the 5% electoral threshold, with the QHP losing parliamentary representation for the first time since it entered the parliament in the 2012 legislative elections.

On 28 August 2026, the newly elected Kurultai convened for its first session, where Tokayev nominated Aibek Dädebai as chairman, and deputies subsequently elected him unanimously. The government, led by Prime Minister Oljas Bektenov, also resigned, with its members continuing to perform their duties until a new government was formed. On 31 August, Tokayev nominated Bektenov for reappointment as prime minister, with the Kurultai approving the nomination and Tokayev subsequently appointing him to the position.

== Background ==
The 8th Parliament of Kazakhstan convened following the 2023 legislative elections to the lower house Mäjilis, which were called after President Kassym-Jomart Tokayev dissolved the 7th Parliament as part of the final stage of the political reset of state institutions that followed the 2022 Kazakh unrest. The elections were held under a reintroduced mixed electoral system approved in the 2022 constitutional referendum, the first such system used since 2004. Amanat (formerly Nur Otan) won a majority of 62 seats, though reduced compared to previous convocations, and the new composition of the Mäjilis included independent deputies elected from single-member districts, representatives of the self-declared opposition Nationwide Social Democratic Party, and first-time parliamentary entrants Auyl and Respublica, bringing in a total of six party factions.

From there, at the opening session of the 8th convocation, Erlan Qoşanov (Amanat) was re-elected as chairman of the Mäjilis, and the Parliament approved the reappointment of Älihan Smaiylov as prime minister of Kazakhstan. During its tenure, the 8th convocation of the Parliament of Kazakhstan served as the final bicameral legislature before the transition to the unicameral Kurultai, adopting legislation on social policy, economic regulation, digitalization, and institutional reforms while overseeing the final stage of Tokayev's post-2022 reform agenda, including constitutional law amendments implementing the transition to the new parliamentary system, before concluding its work on 30 June 2026.

Discussions about a possible further constitutional amendments and snap parliamentary election emerged in 2024; however, in January 2025, during an interview with the newspaper Ana tili, president Tokayev publicly denied plans for any snap elections, including parliamentary ones, stating that the 8th Parliament of Kazakhstan would serve its full term and that elections would be held in accordance with the law.

Despite Tokayev ruling out early elections, ongoing discussions about future constitutional reforms, including proposals to abolish the Senate, speculation persisted about snap parliamentary elections with social activist Qazbek Beisebaev noting that any changes to parliament would first require constitutional amendments or a referendum before snap election, and while the current parliament is generally loyal to the government, other political actors might seek to renew the legislature for strategic purposes. In June 2025, chairman of the Senate Mäulen Äşimbaev acknowledging rumours of early parliamentary elections allegedly taking place in autumn of that year, stated that there were no grounds to expect such elections.

=== 2026 constitutional reforms ===
In September 2025, during his State of the Nation Address, Tokayev announced proposed parliamentary reforms, including a constitutional amendment to abolish the Senate and transform the Parliament of Kazakhstan into a unicameral legislature elected by party-list, suggesting that the change be decided through a referendum sometime in 2027. The announcement was followed by six-month span with the establishment of a working group and later a constitutional commission tasked with drafting amendments. During its work, the commission concluded that the scope of proposed amendments exceeded initial expectations and ultimately endorsed adopting a new constitution, which its draft was finalized in February 2026 and subsequently submitted by Tokayev to a referendum.

The referendum "Yes" vote campaign was organized under the National Coalition "For the People's Constitution of a Fair and Progressive Kazakhstan", bringing together pro-government political parties and public organizations in support of the draft constitution, which proposed restructuring Kazakhstan's legislative system ahead of the transition to the newly unicameral Kurultai. The referendum campaign took place in a restrictive political environment marked by reported pressure on opponents and critics of the draft constitution, censorship, limits on independent polling, and rejected legal challenges, with social media users referring to the draft constitution as "sour cream" to avoid crackdown. The proposal was officially approved by 87% of voters, with Tokayev issuing a decree adopting the new constitution on 17 March 2026, which entered into force on 1 July 2026.

Under the previous constitutional framework, the 8th convocation of the Mäjilis, elected in March 2023, would have served its five-year constitutional term. Under Article 51 of the 1995 Constitution, regular elections to the Mäjilis were required to be held within the two months preceding the expiration of deputies' term, meaning that absent constitutional changes the next legislative elections would have been expected in early 2028. However, the constitutional reforms initiated in 2025 fundamentally altered the structure and electoral timetable of the legislature. Although Tokayev initially proposed holding a referendum on parliamentary reform in 2027, the adoption of a new constitution in 2026 and the transition to a unicameral Kurultai required the dissolution of the existing bicameral system and the organization of early elections to form the new legislature.

Following the approval of the new constitution, the Parliament adopted a series of seven constitutional laws to implement the new state structure. The foundational laws on the presidency, Kurultai, and People's Council were signed by President Kassym-Jomart Tokayev on 5 June 2026, while amendments to existing constitutional laws, including changes affecting the electoral framework and political parties, were signed on 11 June 2026.

=== Minimum wage increase proposal ===
In the lead-up to the 2026 elections in Kazakhstan, economic concerns such as inflation, rising utility costs, and declining real incomes became a key issue in public debate, despite continued official references to macroeconomic growth. Against this backdrop, the Kazakh government's April 2026 proposal to raise the national minimum wage from 85,000 to 150,000 tenge emerged as a prominent socio-economic pledge, with First Vice Minister of National Economy Azamat Amrin linking it to a target of bringing minimum wages closer to 50% of median income. However, Minister of Labour and Social Protection Asqarbek Ertaev later clarified that the proposal remained under review, with no finalized methodology, budget decision, or implementation timeline, ruling out near-term adoption.

Analysts interpreted the timing of the announcement amid preparations for the new unicameral Kurultai as carrying a clear pre-election dimension, with political scientist Daniyar Ashimbayev describing the proposal as having a "pre-election theme" and a populist character that signaled responsiveness to public concerns over living standards while functioning more as a politically salient promise than an immediate policy commitment, in a context where parliamentary elections are generally viewed as less politically destabilizing and where protest sentiment is often expected to be absorbed within pro-government parties.

=== Party system reorganization ===
The Ädilet party was announced in April 2026 by political activists, public figures, business representatives, and members of the Constitutional Commission amid Kazakhstan's post-referendum political restructuring following the adoption of a new constitution. The party emerged ahead of the 2026 legislative elections as a centrist, pro-presidential political force supporting the state's reform agenda.

Its rapid registration, prominent leadership, and close association with the constitutional reform process prompted extensive political commentary. Analysts characterized Ädilet as part of a broader reconfiguration of Kazakhstan's party system following the constitutional reforms, with some describing it as a move toward a more competitive multi-party or quasi two-party system and suggesting that it could reshape the distribution of pro-presidential and centrist voters ahead of the elections. Political scientist Andrei Chebotarev described Ädilet as a potential "sparring partner" to ruling Amanat party, while other observers viewed the party as an attempt to project political renewal within the existing political framework. The significance of Ädilet increased substantially following the 26th Amanat Extraordinary Congress on 12 June 2026, at which Amanat approved its merger into Ädilet. The merger ended Amanat's 27-year existence as an independent political party and transformed Ädilet into the institutional successor to the former ruling party ahead of the legislative elections.

The merger coincided with wider changes across Kazakhstan's party system ahead of the elections. During June 2026, several parliamentary parties underwent leadership changes. Dania Espaeva succeeded Azat Peruaşev as chair of Aq Jol, Qairat Aituğanov replaced Serik Egizbaev as chairman of Auyl, and Nursultan Şoqanov was elected leader of the People's Party of Kazakhstan following the resignation of Ermukhamet Ertisbaev. Political analyst Nurbolat Nyshanbai argued that the simultaneous leadership transitions were unlikely to be coincidental, suggesting they reflected parties' adaptation to a new political period and a redefinition of their roles ahead of the Kurultai elections, while the absence of public conflicts during the changes reflected internal agreements and elite consensus within Kazakhstan's political system. Other observers described the reshuffling as part of a broader renewal of political forces following the constitutional reforms and the transition to the new electoral framework.

=== Election date speculation ===
During the constitutional reform process in January 2026, analysts including Gaziz Abishev and Aidar Alibayev suggested that approval of the transition to a unicameral parliament would likely lead to early legislative elections rather than waiting until the scheduled 2028 vote, arguing that the authorities had incentives to complete the political transition before possible economic deterioration and declining public support. Opposition politician Amirjan Qosanov assessed that the constitutional referendum would be followed by parliamentary approval of the amendments by both chambers, after which elections to the unicameral Kurultai could be held within two to three months.

In the referendum campaign period, Senate chairman Mäulen Äşimbaev stipulated that, if approved, the current bicameral Parliament would remain in office until 1 July 2026, after which elections to the new unicameral Kurultai would be held before 1 September 2026, when the new legislature would begin its duties. Following the referendum, president Tokayev stated at a meeting with representatives of youth organizations involved in the campaign that elections to the Kurultai would be held in the summer. He later confirmed in April 2026 that the vote would take place in the month of August, a timeframe he reiterated again in early June.

Political analyst Daniyar Ashimbayev stated that the constitutional transition created a compressed electoral timetable requiring elections to the Kurultai to be held between 1 August and 1 September 2026, noting media speculation surrounding possible election dates of 16 August, 23 August, and 30 August, while arguing that President Tokayev's advance announcement was intended to encourage parties to begin preparing for the campaign before the formal election decree was issued. Following the Amanat party's announcement of its extraordinary congress in June 2026, he suggested that this was interpreted within broader election-date speculation under the same compressed timetable, with possible voting dates discussed as 16 or 23 August.

On 30 June 2026, during an address to a joint session of Parliament, Tokayev announced that he would sign a decree calling elections to the Kurultai following the entry into force of the new Constitution, adding that the campaign should be conducted under conditions of open, honest, and fair political competition.

=== Transition to the Kurultai ===
On 1 July 2026, as the new constitution entered into force, replacing Kazakhstan's bicameral Parliament with the Kurultai as the country's unicameral legislature, President Kassym-Jomart Tokayev signed Decree No. 1338 calling the first elections to the Kurultai for 23 August 2026. The decree instructed the Central Election Commission (CEC) to organize the election and directed the government and regional authorities to provide the necessary organizational, technical, and financial support.

In announcing the decree, Tokayev stated that the Kurultai should preserve Kazakhstan's parliamentary traditions while strengthening institutional stability and advancing the principles of a "Just Kazakhstan".

== Electoral system ==
Following the adoption of a new constitution in the March 2026 referendum, the electoral framework of Kazakhstan underwent its most significant restructuring since 1995. The reforms abolished the bicameral Parliament of Kazakhstan by dissolving the upper chamber Senate and established a unicameral legislature known as the Kurultai, whose members are known as deputies. The 145 deputies of the Kurultai are elected to five-year terms through a closed party-list proportional representation system from a single nationwide constituency, replacing the mixed electoral system used in the 2023 election and eliminating single-member constituencies.

The reforms also marked a return to the nationwide proportional representation system previously used between 2007 and 2021, for the first time since the 2021 election. Political parties are required to surpass a 5% electoral threshold to obtain representation, with seats allocated through closed party lists using the quota method. Under the constitution's retained imperative mandate provisions, deputies automatically lose their seats if they resign from or are expelled by their respective political parties.

=== Electoral law amendments ===
Ahead of the 2026 legislative elections, the Parliament adopted amendments to the Constitutional Law "On Elections" and related legislation regulating online campaigning, campaign financing, and electoral transparency. The amendments introduced administrative liability for online platforms that published campaign materials without the authorization of candidates or provided unequal conditions to candidates and political parties, while prohibiting financial and material support outside official election funds. They also revised candidate nomination procedures, election administration, and voting rules, including provisions on reorganized election commissions, expanded access to polling stations, and safeguards allowing election results to be invalidated in cases of legal violations.

During parliamentary consideration of the legislation, the CEC stated that online political endorsements, including unpaid posts by bloggers or users displaying party symbols, would require written authorization from the relevant candidate or political party, with unauthorized promotional content potentially constituting "hidden campaigning" under the Administrative Code and subject to administrative fines. Human rights organizations and media observers criticized the proposed rules, arguing that their broad definition of online campaigning risked restricting independent political expression and online discourse ahead of the elections. Kazakh officials maintained that the amendments were intended to strengthen transparency, regulate online campaigning, and ensure equal conditions among participants in the electoral process.

== Electoral timetable ==
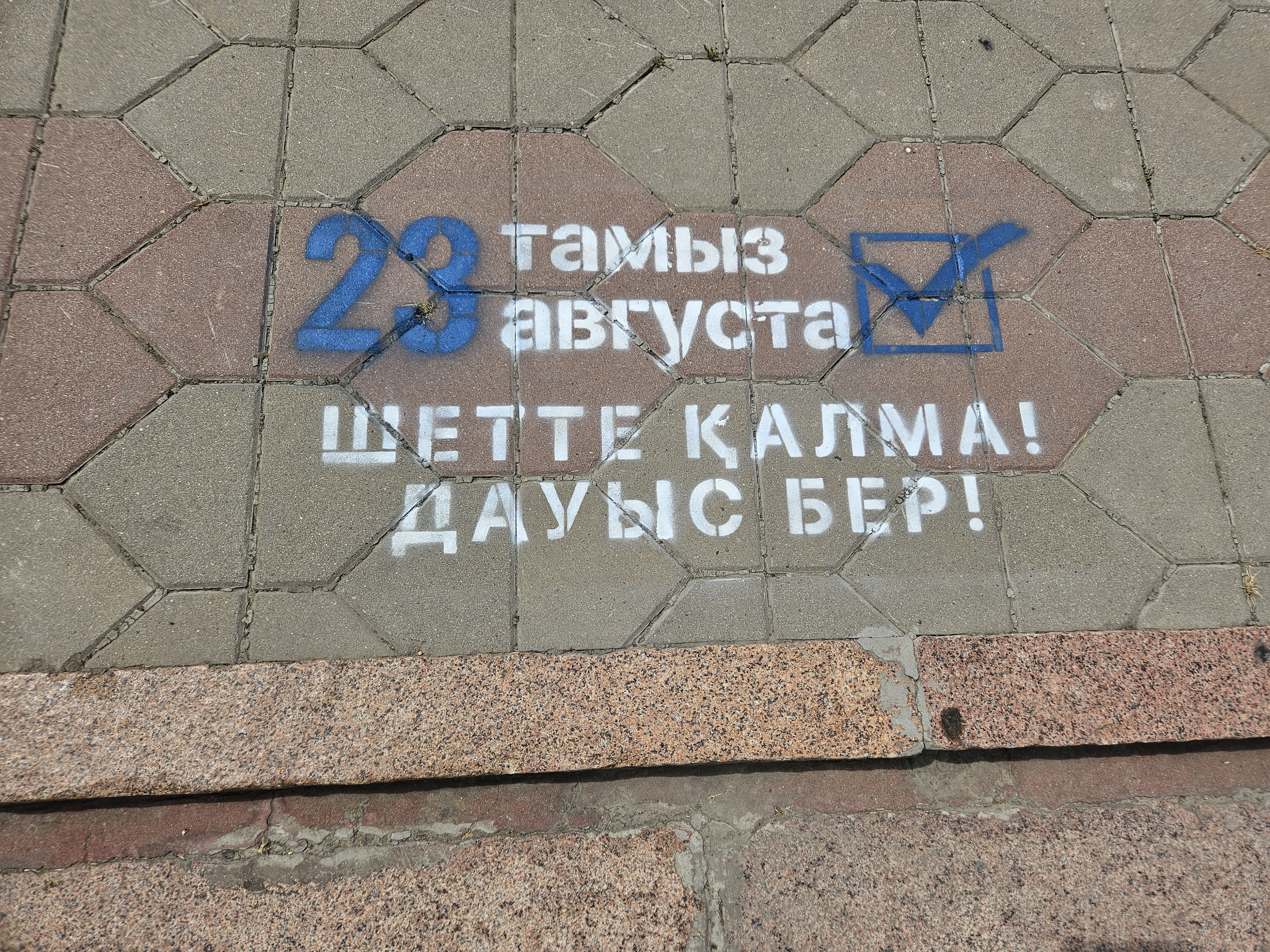
A "Don't Be Left Out! Vote!" Kazakh-language graffiti on the ground calling for the electorate to vote in the election, Shymkent, Kazakhstan

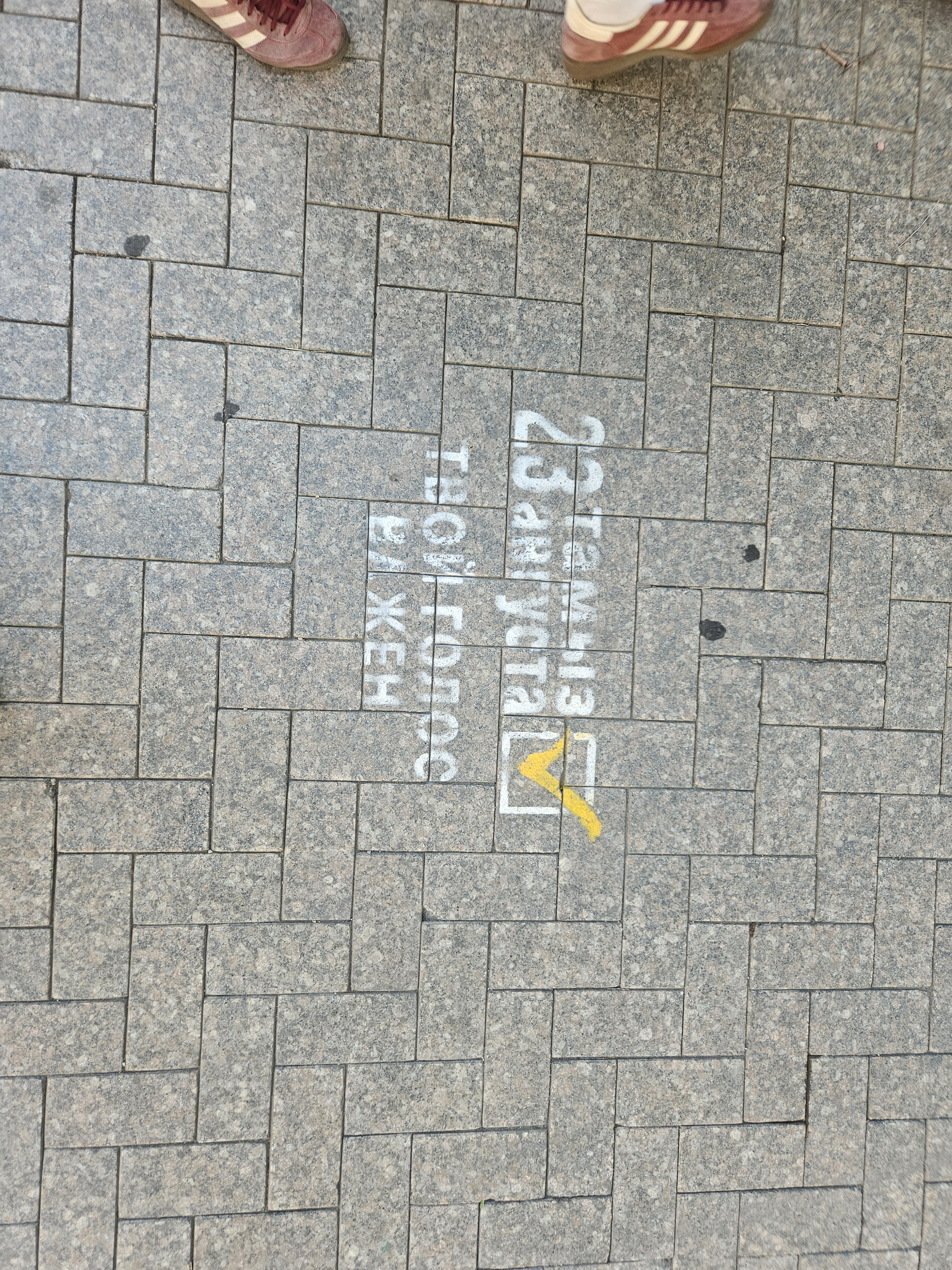
A "Your Vote Matters" Russian-language graffiti for the election, Almaty, Kazakhstan

On 1 July 2026, following the signing of a presidential decree on the holding of elections, the (CEC adopted Resolution No. 26/41 "On approval of the Calendar Plan of the main events for the preparation and conduct of the elections of deputies of the Kurultai of the Republic of Kazakhstan, scheduled for 23 August 2026". The calendar plan set out the main stages of the electoral process as follows:

- 1 July 2026: Appointment of elections
- 2–13 July 2026 (until 18:00 UTC+5): Submission of party lists
- until 18:00 on 23 July 2026: Registration of party lists
- until 11 July 2026: Announcement of the composition of territorial election commissions and their locations
- until 16 July 2026: Announcement of the composition of election commissions, as well as the boundaries of polling stations and locations of election commissions
- 23 July (18:01 UTC+5) – 22 August 2026 (00:00 UTC+5): Pre-election campaigning
- 2 August 2026: Submission of voter lists to precinct election commissions
- from 7 August 2026 – Voters' access to verify their personal data in the voter lists
- 22 August 2026 – Election silence
- 23 August 2026 – Election day

== Political parties ==
As of 1 June 2026, eight political parties were registered in Kazakhstan, including the newly formed Ädilet party, alongside Amanat, Auyl, Aq Jol, the People's Party of Kazakhstan, the Nationwide Social Democratic Party, Baytaq, and Respublica. On 12 June, the ruling Amanat party announced its merger with Ädilet.

Justice Minister Erlan Särsembaev stated that political party registration and reorganization procedures would continue until the new constitution entered into force on 1 July 2026, after which elections to the Kurultai would be announced. He added that new parties registered before that date would be eligible to participate in the 2026 elections.

=== Parliamentary parties ===
| Name | | Party leader | Faction leader | Ideology | Position | 2023 election | | At dissolution |
| Name | | Party leader | Faction leader | Ideology | Position | Votes (%) | Seats | At dissolution |
|---|---|---|---|---|---|---|---|---|
| Amanat | Amanat | Erlan Qoşanov | Aidos Sarym | Kazakh nationalism | Big tent | 53.9% | 62 / 98 | 60 / 98 |
| Auyl | Auyl | Qairat Aituğanov | Serik Egizbaev | Agrarianism | Centre-left | 10.9% | 8 / 98 | 8 / 98 |
| Respublica | Respublica | Aidarbek Qojanazarov | | National liberalism | Centre-right | 8.6% | 6 / 98 | 6 / 98 |
| Aq Jol | Aq Jol | Dania Espaeva | Azat Peruaşev | Liberal conservatism | Centre-right | 8.4% | 6 / 98 | 6 / 98 |
| QHP | People's Party of Kazakhstan | Nursultan Şoqanov | Magerram Magerramov | Social democracy | Centre-left | 6.8% | 5 / 98 | 5 / 98 |
| JSDP | Nationwide Social Democratic Party | Ashat Raqymjanov | | Social democracy | Centre-left | 5.2% | 4 / 98 | 4 / 98 |

=== Contesting parties ===
The CEC confirmed on 1 July 2026 that Ädilet, Auyl, Aq Jol, the People's Party of Kazakhstan, the Nationwide Social Democratic Party, Baytaq, and Respublica would participate in the elections, while Amanat did not contest the election following its merger into Ädilet. On 13 July 2026, the nomination of candidates concluded, with the CEC receiving party lists containing a total of 546 candidates from the seven contesting political parties.

On 23 July 2026, the CEC announced that it had registered 545 candidates for the 145 seats in the Kurultai, with all seven parties meeting the statutory quotas for women, youth, and persons with disabilities, which together comprised 43.9% of all candidates, including 172 women, 74 candidates under the age of 35, and 19 persons with disabilities, while the average candidate age was 45.4 years. During the same briefing, the CEC conducted a draw, overseen by deputy chairman Muhtar Erman, to determine the order in which the seven participating political parties would appear on the 2026 legislative election ballot as follows:

| No. on ballot | Name | | Party leader | No. 1 in party list | Ideology | Position | 2023 election | | Notes |
| No. on ballot | Name | | Party leader | No. 1 in party list | Ideology | Position | Votes (%) | Seats | Notes |
|---|---|---|---|---|---|---|---|---|---|
| 1 | Ädilet | Ädilet | Aibek Dädebai | Almat Abdikeshov | Reformism | Big tent | New | | Party list registered by the CEC on 21 July |
| 2 | JSDP | Nationwide Social Democratic Party | Ashat Raqymjanov | Anargül Äbenova | Social democracy | Centre-left | 5.2% | 4 / 98 | Party list registered by the CEC on 16 July |
| 3 | Baytaq | Baytaq | Azamathan Ämirtai | Aigül Abdualieva | Green politics | Centre-left | 2.3% | 0 / 98 | Party list registered by the CEC on 20 July |
| 4 | QHP | People's Party of Kazakhstan | Nursultan Şoqanov | Ğalymjan Äbdiraiymov | Social democracy | Centre-left | 6.8% | 5 / 98 | Party list registered by the CEC on 20 July |
| 5 | Auyl | Auyl | Qairat Aituğanov | Qaraqat Äbden | Agrarianism | Centre-left | 10.9% | 8 / 98 | Party list registered by the CEC on 21 July |
| 6 | Aq Jol | Aq Jol | Dania Espaeva | Ermek Äbildin | Liberal conservatism | Centre-right | 8.4% | 6 / 98 | Party list registered by the CEC on 17 July |
| 7 | Respublica | Respublica | Aidarbek Qojanazarov | Beibit Älibekov | National liberalism | Centre-right | 8.6% | 6 / 98 | Party list registered by the CEC on 16 July |

== Campaign ==
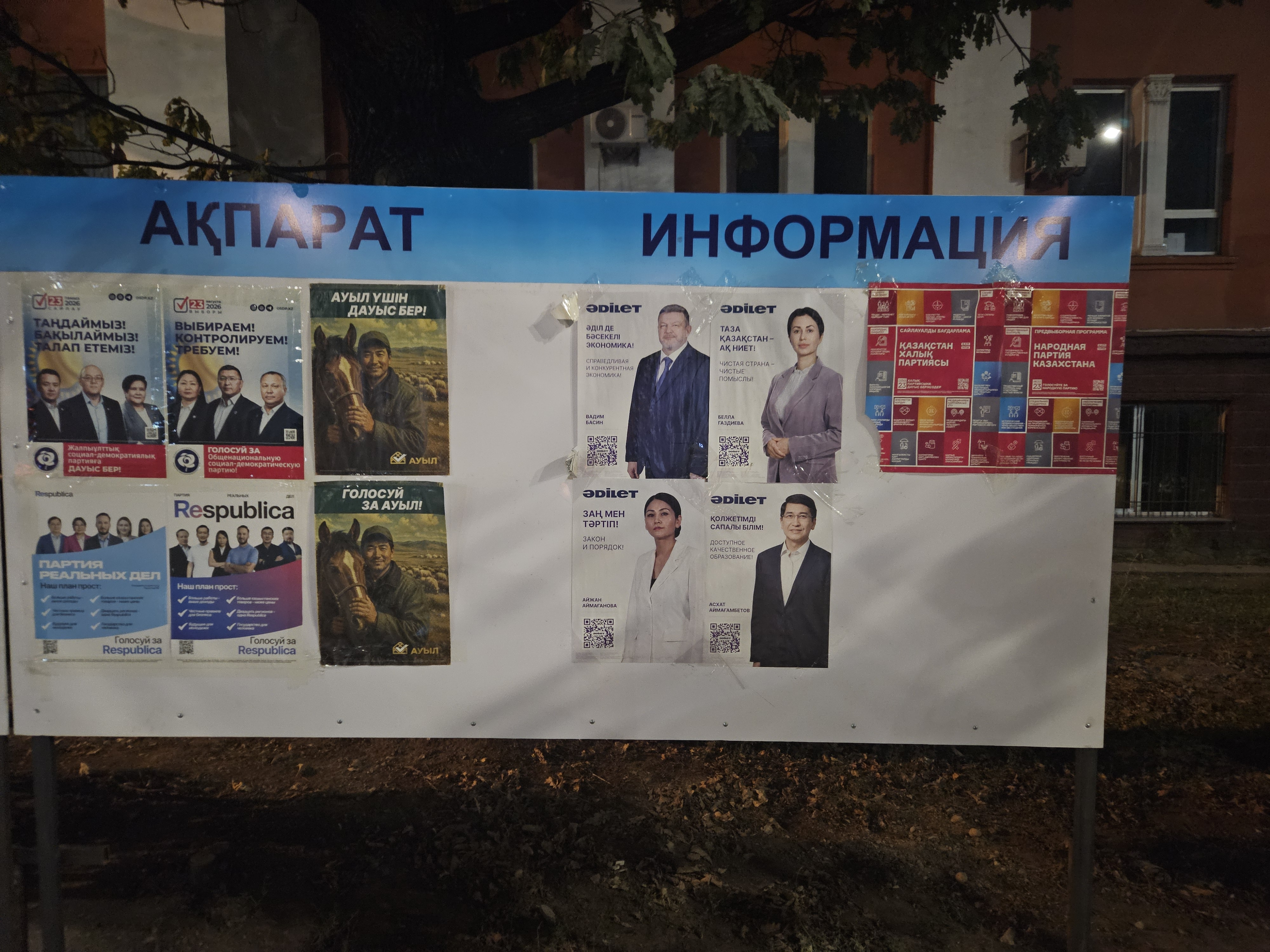
Information board containing the various electoral campaign posters of the contesting parties, Almaty, Kazakhstan, August 2026

=== Campaign finance ===
On 1 July 2026, the CEC announced that the maximum size of political parties' election funds had been tripled under the new electoral legislation, increasing the maximum contribution from parties' own funds to 1.275 billion tenge and the ceiling for voluntary donations to 2.55 billion tenge, while maintaining that campaigns could be financed only through official election funds in order to ensure transparency and oversight of funding sources.

On 15 July 2026, it was reported that political parties were required to pay an election deposit of 15 minimum wages for each candidate on their party lists, although parties that had received at least 5% of the vote in the 2023 legislative elections were exempt and those receiving between 3% and 5% paid half the standard amount, leaving only Ädilet and Baytaq required to pay the full deposit.

=== Campaign slogans and programmes ===
| Party | Slogan | Pre-election programme |
|---|---|---|
| Ädilet | "Let's build a Just Kazakhstan together!" Kazakh: «Бірге Әділетті Қазақстан құрамыз!» Russian: «Построим справедливый Казахстан вместе!» | For a Just Kazakhstan: Full text (in Kazakh); Full text (in Russian) |
| Auyl | "The prosperity of the village is the prosperity of the country!" Kazakh: «Гүлденсе ауыл – гүлденеді еліміз!» Russian: «Процветание села – процветание страны!» | Strong regions – strong center: Full text (in Kazakh); Full text (in Russian) |
| Respublica | "My country! My Republic!"; Kazakh: «Менің елім! Менің Республикам!» Russian: «Моя страна! Моя Республика!» | Respublica: The Party of a Strong Economy and a Decent Life: Full text (in Kazakh); Full text (in Russian) |
| Aq Jol | "Changes are inevitable!" Kazakh: «Өзгерістер қажет!» Russian: «Перемены неизбежны!» | Changes are inevitable: Full text (in Kazakh); Full text (in Russian) |
| People's Party of Kazakhstan | "Fewer words, more action" Kazakh: «Сөз аз, іс көп» Russian: «Меньше слов, больше дела» | The wealth of the country is for the benefit of the people!: Full text (in Kazakh); Full text (in Russian) |
| Nationwide Social Democratic Party | "We choose! We control! We demand!" Kazakh: «Таңдаймыз! Бақылаймыз! Талап етеміз!» Russian: «Выбираем! Контролируем! Требуем!» | 20 Milestones on the Path to Progress: Full text (in Kazakh); Full text (in Russian) |
| Baytaq | "Clean nature. Fair economy. Civic solidarity." Kazakh: «Таза табиғат. Әділетті экономика. Азаматтық ынтымақтастық.» Russian: «Чистая природа. Справедливая экономика. Гражданская солидарность.» | Kazakhstan is a favorable country for living!: Full text (in Kazakh); Full text (in Russian) |

=== Party campaigns ===
==== Ädilet ====
On 3 July 2026, the Ädilet party announced its readiness to contest the Kurultai elections. Party chairman Aibek Dädebai said Ädilet would contest the election with a "clear program" and a professional team, describing the vote as an important stage in implementing the new constitution and strengthening Kazakhstan's democratic institutions. He stated that the party's campaign would focus on justice, the rule of law, responsibility, patriotism, and development, while pledging to compete in an open and lawful election campaign.

On 10 July 2026, Ädilet held its 3rd Extraordinary Congress in Astana, where delegates approved the party's election programme, amended its charter, and nominated 186 candidates for the Kurultai elections. Dädebai described the elections as an important stage in implementing the new constitution, stating that Ädilet's mission was to translate constitutional principles of justice, the rule of law, human dignity, and responsible governance into concrete policies and reforms. He presented the party's program as a five-year action plan focused on improving citizens' quality of life and strengthening cooperation between the state and society. The party's platform emphasized political and institutional reforms, including strengthening democratic institutions, increasing electoral transparency, expanding citizen participation in decision-making, developing local self-government, improving budget transparency, and supporting judicial reform and civil society. Its economic and social proposals included support for domestic production, the creation of one million quality jobs, expanded access to housing, improvements in education and healthcare, and the development of artificial intelligence skills among citizens. Digitalization was presented as a central priority, with party representative Bağdat Musin calling for wider use of digital technologies to improve public services, reduce bureaucracy, increase transparency, and prevent corruption, while also expanding rural internet access and AI-related initiatives. In regional policy, Ädilet proposed reducing dependence on central government funding, expanding the powers of local representative bodies, and allocating at least 1 billion tenge annually in each region for youth mortgage programs while supporting young entrepreneurs through grants and employment initiatives. The approved candidate list included Ädilet representatives, public figures, business representatives, and former Amanat members, including several former Mäjilis deputies and prosecutor Aijan Aimaganova, who gained national prominence as the lead state prosecutor in the 2024 murder trial of former minister Kuandyk Bishimbayev.

==== Aq Jol ====
On 10 June 2026, Aq Jol chairman Azat Peruaşev stated that the party intended to participate in the Kurultai elections and ruling out a potential merger with other political parties, adding that no such proposals had been received.

On 5 July 2026, Aq Jol held its extraordinary election congress in Astana, where delegates approved the party's election programme, "Changes are Needed", and nominated 63 candidates. The programme called for stable economic growth, fair competition, effective public administration, support for entrepreneurship, stronger parliamentarism, anti-corruption measures, technological development, and the protection of national interests. Party chair Dania Espaeva stated that the candidate list consisted of long-serving party members and professionals from business, academia, and public service, reflecting the party's emphasis on professional legislative experience. Delegates also highlighted Aq Jol's parliamentary record since 2023, arguing that a number of the party's proposals on entrepreneurship, taxation, digital development, and parliamentary oversight had been incorporated into legislation and government policy. During the congress, party representatives responded to criticism made at the previous day's Respublica congress by defending Aq Jol's record of representing entrepreneurs and criticizing unnamed political rivals for relying on publicity rather than legislative achievements.

==== Auyl ====
On 24 June 2026, during an extraordinary party congress, outgoing chairman Serik Egizbaev stated that his decision to step down from Auyl chairmanship was part of the party's "intention to fully participate in the upcoming elections under the new political system".

At its 26th Extraordinary Congress on 6 July 2026, Auyl approved its election programme and nominated 69 candidates for the Kurultai elections. The programme consisted of four sections and seven priority areas, focusing on regional development, food security, infrastructure, social policy, education and science, environmental protection, and support for traditional family values. Campaigning under the slogan "Strong regions – strong center", the party stated that its programme was based on more than 75,000 proposals collected from across Kazakhstan through a digital platform. According to First Deputy Chairman Serik Egizbaev, the party sought to campaign on specific policy commitments and highlight its parliamentary record since 2023 rather than relying on broad campaign slogans.

==== Baytaq ====
On 8 July 2026, Baytaq held its 5th Extraordinary Congress in Astana, where delegates adopted the party's updated election platform, "Kazakhstan is a comfortable country for life!", approved amendments to the party charter, and nominated 51 candidates for the Kurultai elections. The platform presented environmental protection as a central direction of state policy, linking it to economic development, healthcare, education, urban planning, and public administration, while proposing public monitoring of the party's election commitments. Party chairman Azamathan Ämirtai stated the new constitution marked a new stage in Kazakhstan's political development and that Baytaq would contest the elections with a platform centered on environmental protection, clean water, public health, and ESG-oriented projects, while announcing that the party's regional campaign headquarters would begin full-scale operations.

The congress was also marked by internal disagreements, as political council member Asqar Imanliev criticized the election platform for insufficiently emphasizing environmental issues and called for a vote on re-electing party chairman Ämirtai, though the proposal was not adopted and the congress proceeded with approving the platform and candidate list. On 13 July, Baytaq held a 6th Extraordinary Congress after four candidates voluntarily withdrew from the party list, reducing the number of nominees from 51 to 47 and requiring delegates to approve an updated electoral list before it was submitted to the CEC.

==== JSDP ====
On 27 March 2026, the Nationwide Social Democratic Party (JSDP) held an assembly in Astana following the constitutional referendum, described by BES.media as a "pre-election review", where it presented its programme manifesto The White Rose of Creation and outlined policy priorities including social justice, economic redistribution, land reform, labor rights, environmental policy, and expanded social guarantees, positioning itself for the upcoming political cycle ahead of the 2026 legislative elections.

The 25th JSDP Extraordinary Congress was held 8 July 2026 in Astana, where delegates approved the party's election programme, adopted a revised charter, renewed the political council, and approved a list of 33 candidates for the Kurultai elections. The party presented its programme, titled "20 Peaks on the Path of Progress", as a continuation of its two decades of social-democratic politics, focusing on freedom, justice, solidarity, democratization, economic reform, social protection, and public accountability. JSDP chairman Ashat Raqymjanov stated that the new constitution had created a new political environment and that the party would participate in the elections by promoting reforms aimed at strengthening political competition, local self-government, judicial independence, and citizens' constitutional rights.

During the congress, the party emphasized policies including the demonopolization of the economy, anti-corruption measures, transparent public finances, protection of workers' rights, increased investment in education and healthcare, and the fair distribution of natural resource revenues. The party's programme also proposed a phased transition to a four-day working week without reducing workers' incomes, the redistribution of agricultural land to citizens for long-term targeted use, and the restructuring of the Samruk-Kazyna sovereign wealth fund by transferring its functions to state ministries.

JSDP representatives also argued that digitalization should serve not only technological modernization but also greater transparency in government decision-making, public spending, and accountability. The approved candidate list included party leaders and current deputies, including Raqymjanov, Nurlan Äuesbaev, Ajar Sagyndyqova, and Nauryz Sailaubai, while Raqymjanov stated that the party expected to secure at least 10% of the vote. Party representatives also criticized competing parties, arguing that some political forces represented business interests rather than social-democratic principles.

Following the submission of the JSDP's party list to the CEC, media reported that candidate Nurym Nurlybekov, who had previously faced criticism over anti-LGBT social media remarks in 2025, remained on the list. Raqymjanov said the remarks did not reflect the party's position and that Nurlybekov had received a formal warning but remained a registered candidate.

==== QHP ====
On 7 July 2026, the People's Party of Kazakhstan (QHP) held its 25th Extraordinary Congress in Astana, where it approved its election programme and nominated 72 candidates for the first elections to the deputies of Kurultai. The congress was the first party meeting following the entry into force of the 2026 Constitution and took place shortly after Nursultan Şoqanov became party chairman following the resignation of Ermukhamet Ertisbaev. The party's programme focused on social policy, labour rights, education, healthcare, regional development, and improving living standards, while its candidate list included representatives from business, law, education, medicine, culture, and public organizations.

During the campaign, Şoqanov presented QHP as a party combining economic efficiency with social responsibility and rejected accusations that its platform represented simple state-funded populism. He also highlighted the record of QHP's parliamentary faction during the 8th convocation, citing legislative initiatives, amendments, and government inquiries as evidence of the party's work on behalf of citizens.

==== Respublica ====
In early May 2026, Majilis deputy and Respublica party chairman Aidarbek Qojanazarov stated that hundreds of party members had expressed interest in becoming candidates for the Kurultai, adding that party list selection would be based on clear policy agendas rather than personal ambition, and that the Respublica party aimed to maximize its parliamentary representation depending on voter support.

At its 5th Extraordinary Congress on 4 July 2026, Respublica re-elected Qojanazarov as its party chairman and approved its election programme and nominated 76 candidates for the 2026 elections. The programme, adopted under the slogan "Citizen's Welfare – Responsible Society – Effective State – Safe Country", emphasized support for entrepreneurship, job creation, public administration reform, education and healthcare, digitalization, strengthening legal institutions, human capital development, and public safety. During the congress, deputy chairman Oljas Quspekov criticized unnamed political forces that presented themselves as defenders of business interests, arguing that their political agenda had lost relevance, with his remarks, including a comparison of such forces to a "decorative pony", interpreted as criticism of the Aq Jol party. Qojanazarov stated that the party sought to promote economic modernization, support new industries, and strengthen fair competition.

=== Pre-election debates ===
On 23 July 2026, the CEC announced that pre-election debates would be held during the campaign period, with negotiations underway to organize them on the 24KZ television channel, while political parties were also permitted to finance additional debates on other broadcasters through their election funds.

On 29 July 2026, following the state broadcaster Qazaqstan's announcement the previous day, representatives of the seven contesting political parties participated in a nationally televised debate organized under the theme "The Future of Kazakhstan is Human Capital", signing a Charter of Ethics committing to refrain from personal attacks before debating their policies on education, employment, social welfare, regional development, environmental protection, entrepreneurship, and technological innovation, while viewers were invited to submit questions through social media and WhatsApp and speaking order was determined by random draw to ensure equal conditions for all participants. Additionally, the pre-election debate was conducted entirely in the Kazakh language, marking the first nationally televised election debate in Kazakhstan to be held exclusively in Kazakh. An alleged technical error occurred during the broadcast when the audience poll conducted during the debate, asking viewers to indicate which party representative they preferred, displayed incorrect figures totaling 156%; the moderator acknowledged the mistake during the live broadcast, after which corrected results were displayed.

On 4 August 2026, Channel Seven held an open draw to determine the speaking order for the second televised debate, with representatives of all seven participating parties selecting numbered cards in a procedure conducted publicly to ensure equal conditions for the participants. On 5 August, representatives of the seven parties participated in the second televised debate, which consisted of four stages covering the presentation of election programmes, proposals for the development of education, questions between party representatives, questions from viewers, and concluding statements. The discussion focused on education, digitalization and artificial intelligence, higher education, vocational training, environmental education, teacher remuneration, support for rural specialists, and the development of science and technology. Representatives of Ädilet proposed expanding the use of artificial intelligence in education and training five million Kazakhstanis in digital technologies and AI skills over five years, while Respublica advocated reforms to higher education and greater international competitiveness; other parties addressed access to higher education, environmental education, vocational training, teacher salaries, rural employment, and scientific and technological development.

On 12 August 2026, Jibek Joly TV held a nationally televised team debate, the first of its kind in Kazakhstan, featuring two representatives simultaneously from each of the seven contesting political parties, under the theme "Law and Order — the Basis of a Just Kazakhstan". The debate consisted of four stages covering the presentation and criticism of party programmes, questions from journalists and viewers, direct exchanges between party representatives, and final "Promise" statements outlining commitments to voters. The discussion addressed issues including judicial independence, law enforcement, alimony enforcement, gambling addiction, cattle theft, economic crime, vandalism, environmental responsibility, poverty, education, healthcare, and the protection of private property.

2026 Kazakh legislative election debates
| No. | Date and time | Organiser | Location | Language | Moderator | Link | P Present R Representative | | | | | | |
| No. | Date and time | Organiser | Location | Language | Moderator | Link | Ädilet | Auyl | Aq Jol | QHP | Respublica | JSDP | Baytaq |
|---|---|---|---|---|---|---|---|---|---|---|---|---|---|
| 1 | 29 July 2026; 19:25 | Qazaqstan | Almaty | Kazakh | Erqanat Köpjasar | YouTube | R Bekturov | R Egizbaev | R Nuraldinov | R Suñqar | R Smolyakova | R Sämbetbai | R Qadyrbaeva |
| 2 | 5 August 2026; 20:26 | Channel Seven | Astana | Kazakh, Russian | Almas Äşim; Madïna Almoldina; Alfia Haidarova; Ğanï Muqaşuly; Oksana Peters | YouTube | R Kenzhekhanuly | R Baimanov | R Tastekei | R Qusaiyn | R Madali | R Nasibulov | R Baizahanov |
| 3 | 12 August 2026; 20:00 | Jibek Joly TV | Astana | Kazakh, Russian | Ğaziz Äbişev; Aidana Üsenbay | YouTube | R Aimanova & Myrzağaraev | R Sultanqulova & Sauryqov | R Jäukebaev & Äbildin | R Bidaibekov & Smirnova | R Quspekov & Şükijanova | R Li & Kamalova | R Ömirtai & Turtaev |
| 4 | 19 August 2026; 20:00 | 24KZ | Astana | Kazakh, Russian | Nursultan Qurman; Möldir Dosbay | YouTube | P Dädebai | P Aituğanov | P Espaeva | P Şoqanov | P Qojanazarov | P Raqymjanov | P Ämirtai |
Which party's representative performed best in the television debates?
| Date | | Organiser | Polling firm | | Respondents | | Ädilet | Auyl | Aq Jol | QHP | Respublica | JSDP | Baytaq |
| 29 July 2026 | | Qazaqstan | Institute for Democracy | | 21,334 | | 67.1% | 5.4% | 9.9% | 8.2% | 4.3% | 2.2% | 2.1% |
| 5 August 2026 | | Channel Seven | Kazakhstan Institute of Social Development | | 73,628 | | 45.4% | 15.6% | 8.0% | 7.0% | 12.0% | 9.7% | 1.6% |
| 12 August 2026 | | Jibek Joly TV | Kazakhstan Institute of Social Development | | 165,153 | | 60.6% | 15.1% | 3.5% | 3.3% | 10.2% | 3.9% | 2.7% |

== Conduct ==
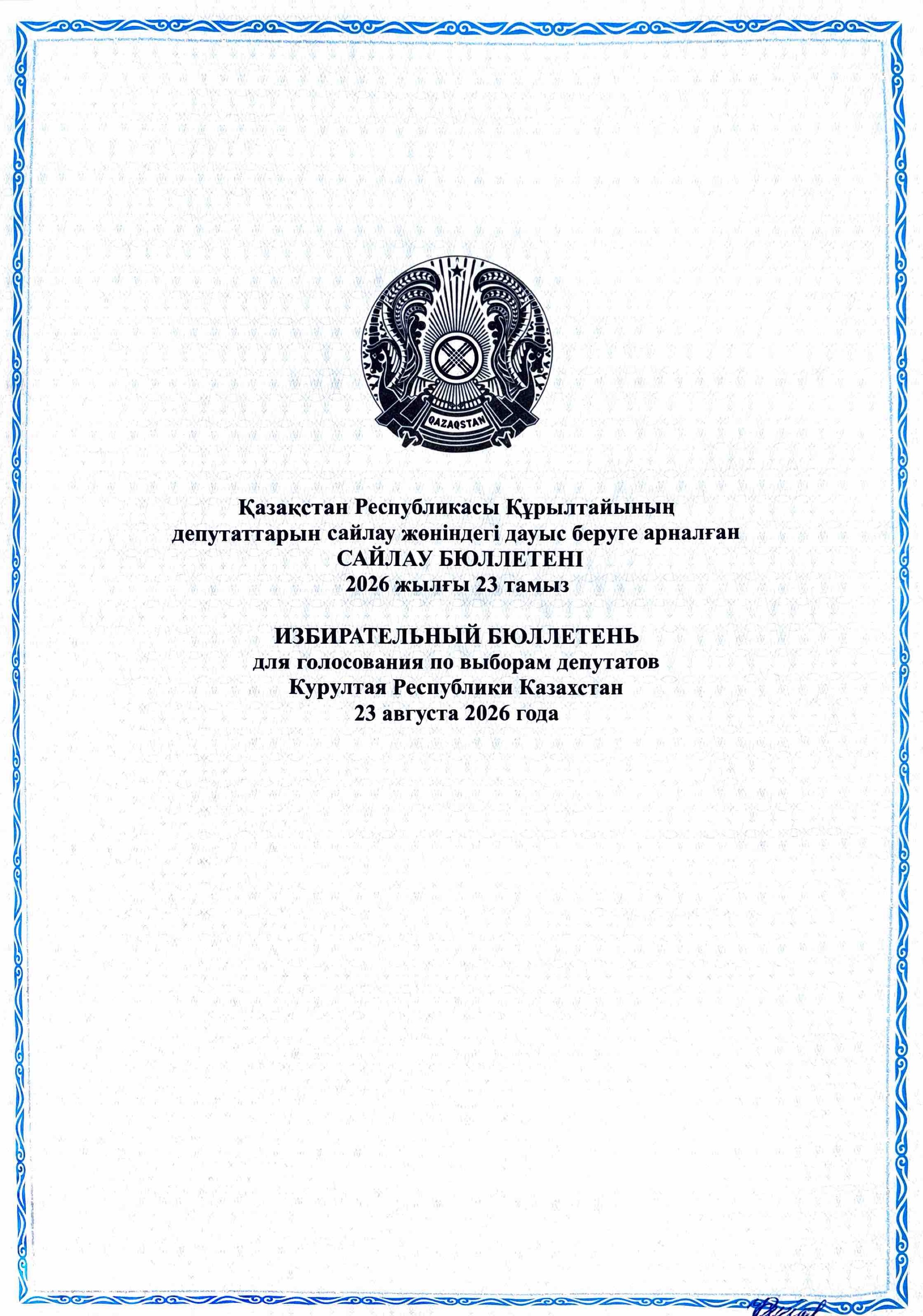
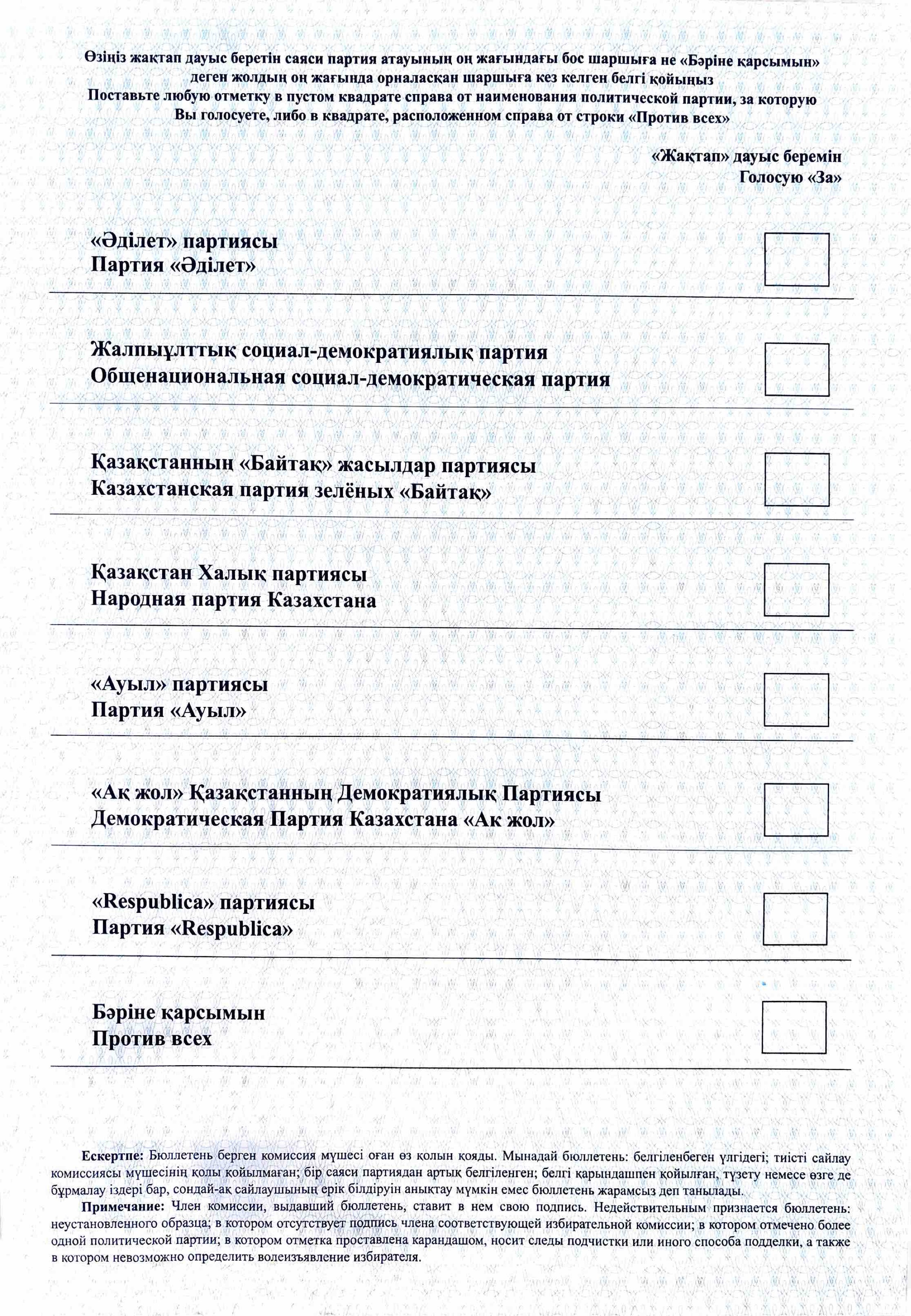
Voting ballot used in the election (written in both Kazakh and Russian)

Elections in Kazakhstan are prepared and conducted by various bodies of election commissions.

=== Preparations ===
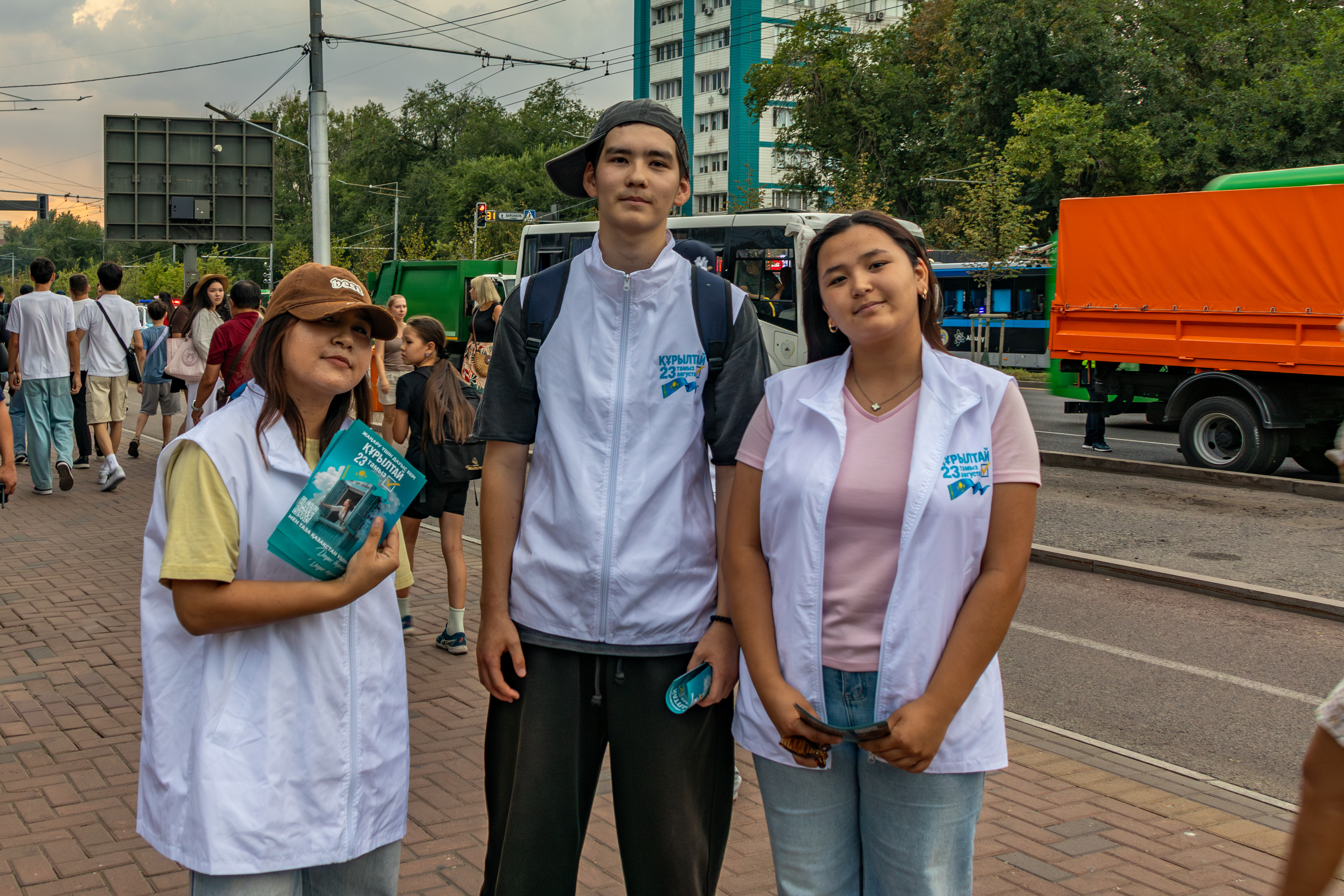
Youth volunteers in Almaty distributing flyers for the election, August 2026

At its first meeting following the promulgation of the election decree on 1 July 2026, the CEC approved the election calendar, adopted implementing resolutions governing party nominations, candidate registration, campaigning, election observation, and voting procedures, established the administrative framework for organizing the first Kurultai elections under the new constitution, and launched a three-stage nationwide training programme for more than 71,000 election commission members to ensure the uniform application of electoral legislation. As part of the programme, the CEC held training seminars for representatives of political parties on 3 July, territorial election commissions on 17 July, media representatives on 22 July, and political parties, accredited public associations, and non-profit organizations on 28 July, covering electoral legislation, election administration, campaigning, financing, media coverage, and election observation.

On 1 July, the CEC also announced that 10,427 polling stations would operate for the election, including 9,780 stations at voters' places of residence and 647 at places of temporary stay, with 82 stations to operate abroad in 64 countries; 71,266 election commission members were expected to participate in administering the vote, including 1,729 members of territorial commissions and 69,537 members of precinct commissions. The Ministry of Foreign Affairs subsequently on 23 July 2026 confirmed the establishment of 82 precinct election commissions at Kazakhstan's diplomatic missions abroad in 64 countries. On 3 August 2026, precinct election commissions began operating, with more than 10,400 polling stations opening ahead of election day.

On 3 August 2026, the CEC presented the ballot paper, which was to be printed double-sided on A4 paper, with the political parties listed in the order determined by the 23 July drawing followed by an "Against all" option; 12,731,847 paper ballots in-total were to be produced for the 12,605,788 registered voters, including a 1% reserve.

On 7 August 2026, the CEC launched online services enabling voters to determine the number and location of their assigned polling station by selecting their region and entering their individual identification number, with the service also made available through the eGov Mobile application.

By 12 August 2026, the CEC reported that 10,423 polling stations would operate on election day, including 107 stations scheduled to open at 06:00 rather than 07:00 to serve voters at military units, inpatient medical institutions, continuously operating organizations, rotational workplaces, and special temporary-isolation facilities.

On 13 August 2026, President Kassym-Jomart Tokayev received CEC chairman Nurlan Äbdirov for a briefing on preparations for the election and called for it to be held under the principle of "Law and Order" in an open and equal electoral environment.

On 14 August 2026, the CEC launched Sailau AI, an AI-powered assistant available through its website and Telegram that provides voters with information in Kazakh and Russian on voting procedures, absentee certificates, voter-list issues, and other election-related matters, using the AlemLLM language model and relevant electoral legislation as its knowledge base.

From 4 to 17 August, the CEC conducted inspection visits across all 20 regions to assess the readiness and material and technical equipment of polling stations, voter-information arrangements, call centres, and territorial election commissions, including the training of election commission members.

On 18 August 2026, the Ministry of Foreign Affairs announced that three polling stations abroad—in Ukraine, Iran, and Ethiopia—would not operate on election day because of the security situation in Ukraine and Iran and the lack of registered voters in Ethiopia, reducing the number of operational overseas polling stations from 82 to 79.

As of 21 August 2026, the CEC had received 203 applications during the campaign, including 129 on electoral legislation and 62 on organizational matters, while reporting no complaints against territorial election commissions and warning that electoral interference, breaches of voting secrecy, obstruction of voting, and voting on behalf of others could incur liability.

=== Election funding ===
In May 2026, the CEC estimated that the cost of the 2026 elections could exceed 15–20 billion tenge, surpassing the expenses of previous national elections, including the 2026 constitutional referendum. CEC Secretary Şavkat Ötemisov stated that the final budget would be determined after the announcement of the election date, with major expenditures expected to be driven by the remuneration of election commission staff and logistical costs. Deputy Prime Minister and Minister of National Economy Serik Jumanğarin stated that the elections would be financed from the republican budget, with detailed calculations to be prepared once the official date was confirmed.

In June 2026, CEC officials reported that the final cost estimate had not yet been submitted, and that the government was awaiting updated calculations before allocating funds.

On 1 July 2026, the CEC confirmed that the 2026 elections would be financed from the government of Kazakhstan's reserve, as they had not been included in the 2026 state budget, with approximately 75% of total expenditures allocated to the remuneration of election commission members, while the remainder would cover printing, logistics, transportation, and information support costs, and that the final budget would be approved by decision of the cabinet following submission of consolidated estimates by the CEC.

On 9 July 2026, the government allocated 34.3 billion tenge from its reserve to finance the elections, a decision announced by the CEC on 14 July. According to CEC member Mikhail Bortnik, about 8.5 billion tenge was allocated for the work of election commissions, while the funding also covered election administration in Kazakhstan and abroad, election materials, logistics, and overseas voting, for which 124.5 million tenge was allocated to the Ministry of Foreign Affairs.

=== Electronic voting ===
CEC secretary Şavkat Ötemisov stated that electronic voting was not under active consideration for the 2026 election, although Kazakhstan continued to study international experience with electronic voting systems. Ötemisov cited cybersecurity risks, including concerns over external interference and cyberattacks against election infrastructure, as well as the high projected costs of implementing a secure electronic voting system. At the same time, Minister of Artificial Intelligence and Digital Development Jaslan Mädiev stated that secure electronic voting systems could be developed in Kazakhstan if formally required, noting that technical solutions could be designed to meet cybersecurity, speed, and usability requirements.

=== Media and information environment ===
On 9 July 2026, First Vice Minister of Culture and Information Qanat Ysqaqov announced that the ministry would monitor more than 20,000 websites and online platforms during the election campaign, compared with about 1,000 media outlets in previous elections. He stated that the expansion reflected the growth of social media and online disinformation and argued that ensuring citizens' access to reliable information was necessary for the public legitimacy of the elections.

On 23 July 2026, Ysqaqov stated that media outlets could conduct election-related blitz polls, provided they were not presented as sociological surveys or accompanied by unauthorized publication of samples and final results, while the CEC clarified that formal public opinion polls could only be conducted by organizations registered with the commission under electoral law. The Centre for Combating Disinformation of the Central Communications Service (JAQ.OrtCom) also warned of increased election-related disinformation, reporting fake social media pages impersonating a political party, coordinated bot activity targeting official campaign accounts, and the potential use of artificial intelligence to generate misleading election content, while urging voters to verify information before sharing it.

Vice Minister of Artificial Intelligence and Digital Development Baqtiiar Muhametqaliev stated that digital platforms operating in Kazakhstan, including TikTok and YouTube, were required to comply with national legislation governing AI-generated content, including mandatory labeling requirements, and warned that the growing use of artificial intelligence to create misinformation posed an increasing challenge during the election period.

JAQ.OrtCom subsequently reported the circulation of fabricated statements, press releases, photographs, and videos using the identities of heads of state bodies and CEC representatives, while urging voters to rely on official sources and avoid sharing unverified information; it also said that the Prosecutor General's Office was investigating cases involving the dissemination of false information. On 11 August, the Legal Media Center expressed concern over what it described as increased pressure on freedom of expression, citing restrictions affecting independent media outlets and journalists and reporting that Radio Free Europe/Radio Liberty journalists faced a risk of losing accreditation during the election period. On 14 August, the Committee to Protect Journalists joined eight local and international press-freedom and human-rights organizations in expressing concern over what they described as escalating pressure on independent journalists ahead of the election, citing the arrest of political commentator Azamat Omarov, criminal investigations and travel restrictions involving journalists Lukpan Akhmedyarov and Dinara Yegeubayeva, and the prison sentence imposed on reporter Aleksandra Alyokhova. On 15 August 2026, sociologist Serik Beisembaev, director of the PaperLab research centre, told Radio Free Europe/Radio Liberty that the authorities had chosen to strengthen political control rather than pursue further liberalisation following the January 2022 unrest, with pressure expanding from major media and political figures to journalists, bloggers, activists, and social-media users, contributing to increased self-censorship and a narrowing space for public criticism, while he also criticised the return to a fully proportional electoral system, arguing that the absence of self-nominated candidates reduced the independence of deputies and weakened political representation.

On 14 August 2026, JAQ.OrtCom reported a further increase in election-related disinformation, identifying approximately 15 coordinated campaigns distributed through more than 200 anonymous and destructive accounts using Telegram channels, social media, bot networks, manipulated documents, and AI-generated audio, photographs and videos, including deepfakes featuring public figures and heads of state bodies, while noting that 44 counter-disinformation materials had been produced to debunk false claims and improve public information literacy. JAQ.OrtCom's expert Aibar Oljai attributed the intensification of information manipulation to the heightened political importance of the election period and warned that such campaigns could be used to influence public opinion, while urging citizens to critically assess and verify information encountered online.

On 21 August 2026, deputy prosecutor general Erlan Ötegenov reported that prosecutors had registered eight electoral law violations, including three related to public opinion polling and five to campaigning during the prohibited period, resulting in administrative liability for seven individuals and one legal entity. Later that day, First Vice Minister of Culture and Information Qanat Ysqaqov reported that the ministry had identified 21 instances of materials allegedly violating electoral law during the campaign, most involving unauthorized public opinion polls or the publication of poll results during prohibited periods, while other cases concerned improper or missing labeling of election-related materials.

=== Voter registration ===
By 1 July and 1 January every year, information on voters and the boundaries of polling stations are submitted by the local executive bodies (akimats) in electronic form to their territorial election commissions, which ensure the verification and submission of information to the higher election commissions.

As of 1 July 2026, the CEC reported that 12,561,644 citizens were registered in the voter list, representing an increase of 99,848 voters since the 2026 referendum. By 2 August 2026, the number of registered voters had increased to 12,605,788, with the largest voter populations recorded in Almaty (1,329,251), Turkistan Region (more than one million), Astana (1,014,817), Karaganda Region (758,489), Jambyl Region (730,236), and Shymkent (713,491), while Ulytau Region had the smallest electorate, with 138,362 registered voters.

Voter registration and related procedures followed the deadlines set by the Chapter 4 of the Constitutional Law "On the Republican Referendum" and the associated electoral regulations. Akimats are responsible for compiling the voter lists at the place of residence, updating them to reflect recent migration or submitted applications, and submitting them to the precinct and territorial referendum commissions. Voters wishing to vote at a polling station other than their place of permanent registration were required to submit a written application thirty days before election day (by 23 July 2026) to their local äkimat to be temporarily included in another polling station's voter list. Twenty days before election day (2 August), akimats were required to finalize the voter lists, electronically transfer them to the relevant precinct election commissions, and freeze further routine amendments except those permitted by law. On 3 August, the CEC also announced the introduction of online services enabling precinct election commissions to verify a citizen's permanent registration through the eGov portal and, in certain cases, allow temporary registration at the address of a polling station on election day for citizens who had been removed from registration and were not otherwise included in the voter lists; the registration-verification service was to be available at limited 5,106 polling stations. Fifteen days before election day (7 August), the voter lists were made available for public inspection at polling stations, allowing voters to verify their registration and request corrections or additions to inaccurate or incomplete information before election day.

Voters who expected to be away from their registered polling station could obtain an absentee voting certificate from their precinct election commission between the submission of voter lists for review and election day (23 August 2026), enabling them to vote at another polling station within Kazakhstan, provided they had not already been included in another voter list. By election day, 17,132 voters had received certificates of exclusion from the voter list granting them the right to vote at another polling station according to CEC deputy chairman.

=== Accessibility ===
On 14 July 2026, the CEC announced that polling stations would provide barrier-free access for voters with disabilities, together with Braille ballot templates, audio instructions, and sign language interpretation, while local authorities were instructed to provide accessible transportation and assess polling station accessibility in cooperation with disability organizations. CEC chairman Nurlan Äbdirov called on political parties to ensure that campaign materials and public events were accessible to voters with disabilities, including by providing sign language interpretation, accessible election programmes, and barrier-free access to campaign venues.

On 11 August 2026, the CEC Working Group on Ensuring the Electoral Rights of Persons with Disabilities reviewed the accessibility of polling stations with the participation of more than 100 representatives of election commissions, government bodies, political parties, disability organizations, and election observation missions, assessing physical accessibility and the availability of assistive materials, while also reviewing the Interactive Accessibility Map and Braille and audio ballot materials and issuing recommendations to address identified shortcomings before election day.

Ahead of election day, the Almaty City Akimat announced on 19 August 2026 that 170 Invataxi vehicles, including 36 specially equipped vehicles, would provide transportation for voters with disabilities and limited mobility, including wheelchair users and people with visual impairments.

During election day, accessibility audit expert Almaz Utkurov reported that some polling stations in Almaty still had accessibility problems, including missing ramps, malfunctioning assistance call buttons, and delays in the provision of Invataxi transportation, although he found conditions at some polling stations to be generally compliant with accessibility requirements.

=== Election day ===
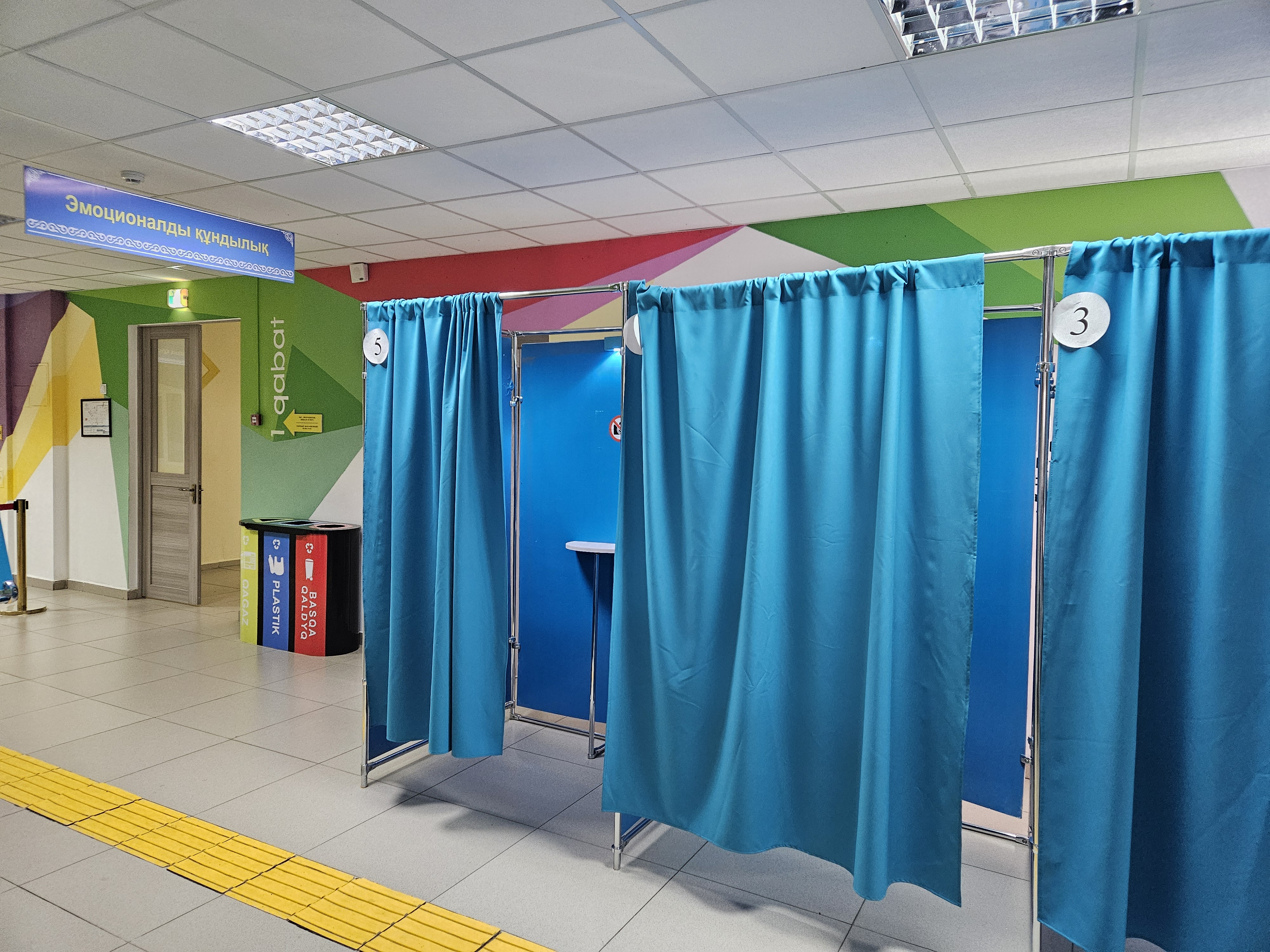

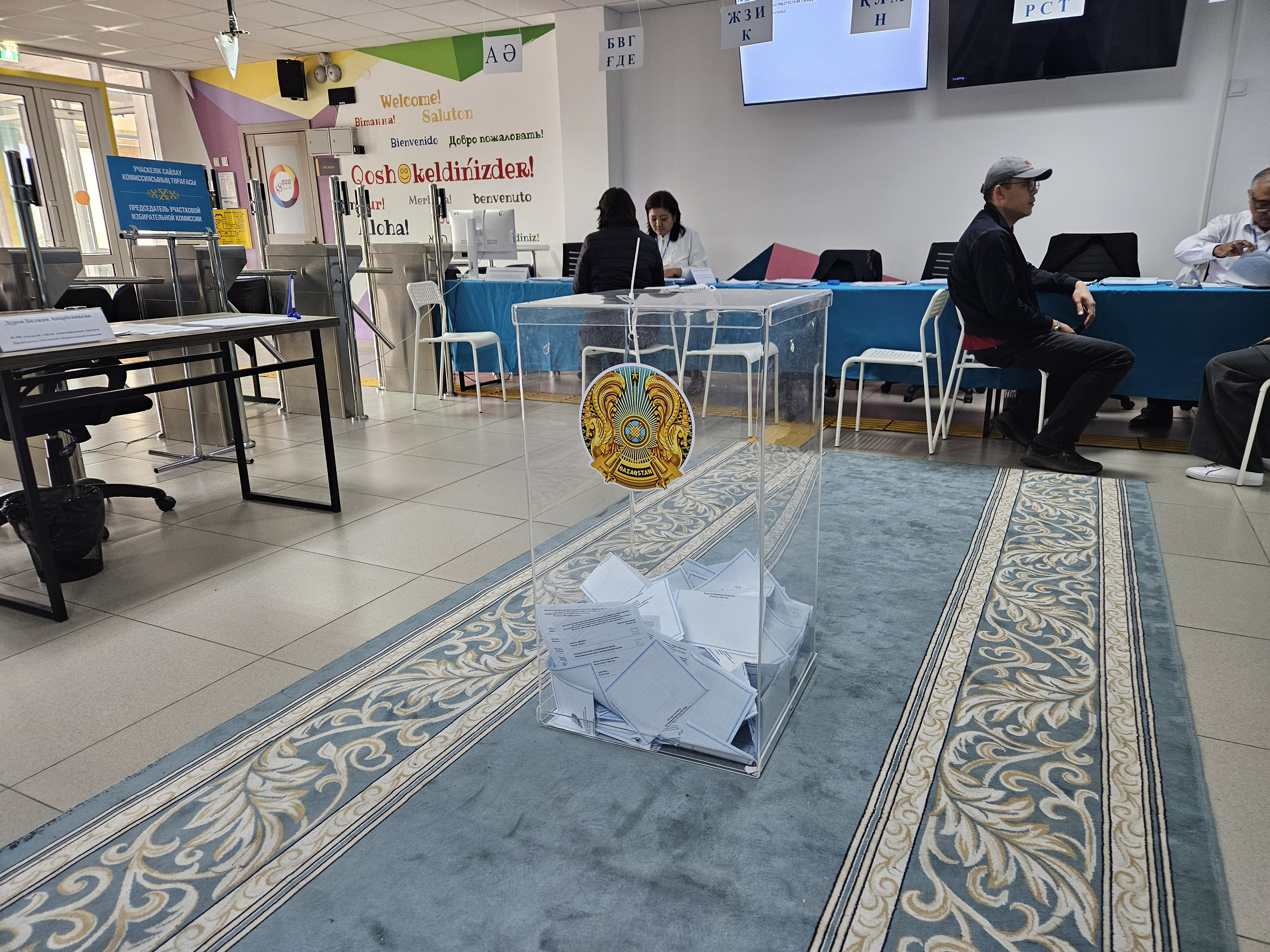
The voting booths (above) and ballot box (below) of the No. 490 polling station of Astana, Kazakhstan

On 23 August 2026, voting in the Kurultai elections began at 07:00, with 10,363 polling stations operating across Kazakhstan and 19 polling stations in 16 foreign countries, while 107 polling stations, mainly at military units, had opened at 06:00, with the first overseas polling stations opening in Seoul and Tokyo.

On election day, online voter registration verification services were available at 5,106 polling stations, while one day temporary registration services operated at 221 polling stations, allowing eligible citizens without a current registration at their polling station to be added to the voter list and vote.

From 09:00, the Qazaqstan Radio and Television Corporation, with the support of national and regional media, conducted a 16-hour nationwide online marathon until 00:30, featuring live coverage from Astana, Almaty and Shymkent, updates from overseas polling stations, briefings by the CEC and international observers, and interviews and discussions with public figures, experts, journalists, and civil society representatives.

Election day publicity included parachutist Timofey Merkulov landing near a polling station in the Almaty Region after jumping from an aircraft, while a family arrived at another polling station by hot air balloon.

During voting, seven voters in Astana, Almaty, Shymkent, Oral and Kostanay were fined for publishing photos of completed ballots, the Prosecutor General's Office reported, while authorities recorded no violations by election commissions or serious public-order incidents.

Activists also reported restrictions on election day. Almaty-based civil activist Äset Äbişev said police had barricaded the entrance to his home, in which he described as a violation of his right to vote, while North Kazakhstan activist Nurbol Önerhan, who was under probation and subject to electronic monitoring, said he was repeatedly required to report to probation officials on election day and that police later visited his home.

Voting ended at 20:00, after which polling stations closed and election commissions began counting the ballots. Overseas polling stations operated according to local time zones, with the final polling station, in San Francisco, closing later than those in Kazakhstan.

== Observation ==
Senate chairman Mäulen Äşimbaev, during the council meeting of the CIS Interparliamentary Assembly (IPA CIS) on 21 May, invited observers from the IPA CIS to observe the elections and expressed hope for their participation.

On 9 July 2026, the Kazakh government invited the Parliamentary Assembly of the Collective Security Treaty Organization (CSTO) and the CIS Interparliamentary Assembly to observe the Kurultai elections, with Foreign Minister Ermek Köşerbaev stating that the vote would be conducted in accordance with national legislation and international standards.

By 18 August 2026, the CEC had accredited a total of 777 international observers from 42 countries and 13 international organizations, including 138 members of parliament from 41 countries and representatives of the OSCE Office for Democratic Institutions and Human Rights, Commonwealth of Independent States, Shanghai Cooperation Organisation, CIS Interparliamentary Assembly, and Turkic Academy, while election authorities from 22 countries, including 11 foreign heads of CECs, were also expected to monitor the vote.

Ahead of the vote, independent observers raised concerns over restrictions on domestic election monitoring, as amendments to the electoral law barred Kazakh organizations receiving foreign funding from conducting observation, affecting established groups such as Erkindik Qanaty and the Young Voters League, while other organizations reported administrative obstacles to accreditation.

=== OSCE ===
On 18 May 2026, the CEC met with a delegation of Organization for Security and Co-operation in Europe (OSCE) Permanent Representatives to discuss constitutional and electoral reforms, measures to strengthen electoral infrastructure and rights protections, concerns over external interference, and future cooperation, with CEC deputy chairman Muqtar Erman announcing that an official invitation would be sent to the OSCE Office for Democratic Institutions and Human Rights (ODIHR) to observe the upcoming Kurultai elections.

On 10 July 2026, following an invitation from the Kazakh authorities, the ODIHR opened an election observation mission in Astana led by ambassador Vincent Piket, comprising a 12-member core team, with 22 long-term observers scheduled to deploy from 18 July and up to 300 short-term observers requested to observe election day alongside delegations from the OSCE Parliamentary Assembly and the Parliamentary Assembly of the Council of Europe. On the same day, the mission met with the CEC, where both sides discussed preparations for the elections, the new electoral system, the work of election commissions, voter information, and the role of domestic and international observers, while the CEC stated it would provide the mission with the conditions necessary to carry out its work in accordance with Kazakhstan's legislation and international obligations. On 23 July, Piket confirmed that 22 long-term observers had been deployed to Kazakhstan to monitor the election campaign and electoral process.

On 13 August 2026, the OSCE Parliamentary Assembly announced that nearly 80 parliamentarians and staff from around 30 countries would deploy to Kazakhstan as short-term observers for the 23 August elections, led by OSCE Special Co-ordinator Gábor Hajdu of Romania and Head of the OSCE PA Delegation Lucija Tacer Perlin of Slovenia; the delegation would work alongside the OSCE/ODIHR mission and the PACE delegation, with observers receiving briefings from election authorities, political parties, civil society, media, and independent experts before deploying across Kazakhstan to assess the electoral process.

On 7 August 2026, the OSCE/ODIHR election observation mission published an interim report assessing the electoral environment and preparations for the election. The report raised concerns regarding political pluralism, media freedom, and self-censorship, noting that all participating parties supported the president's policies and that some interlocutors considered the absence of genuine opposition parties and independent candidates a limitation on political participation and pluralism. The mission also reported that pressure on dissidents contributed to self-censorship and that state ownership and non-transparent budget subsidies limited media pluralism despite the large number of registered media outlets.

On 24 August 2026, the ODIHR, together with the OSCE PA and the Parliamentary Assembly of the Council of Europe, said the elections were technically well prepared but took place amid limited political pluralism, restrictions on independent candidates and media, an uneven playing field that advantaged the Ädilet party through the use of public resources, and reports of pressure on voters and restricted observer access to vote counting. The observers also reported discrepancies between voter activity observed at polling stations and officially reported turnout figures, as well as significant procedural violations during the vote count, raising concerns about the integrity of turnout reporting and the counting process.

== Opinion polls ==
As of 22 July 2026, the CEC had received notifications from six legal entities intending to conduct election-related public opinion polls — Institute of Eurasian Integration, DATAmetrics, Institute for Public Policy, Institute for Comprehensive Social Research–Astana (SOCIS-A), Kazakhstan Institute of Social Development, and Research Association "Institute of Democracy" — using methods including face-to-face, telephone and internet surveys, focus groups, expert surveys, and exit polls.

Multiple opinion polls conducted during the 2026 election campaign reported relatively high declared voter participation. A comparative analysis published by the Kazakhstan Institute for Strategic Studies on 17 August, based on seven surveys conducted between 13 June and 17 August, found that between 70.3% and 75.6% of respondents stated their intentions to vote, while the share of undecided voters declined substantially during the campaign, from 22.6% in a DATAMetrics survey conducted from 13 June to 2 July to 5.3% in the latest measurement by the Public Policy Institute. The surveys also indicated continued leadership by Ädilet, followed by Auyl generally ranked second, while Aq Jol and Respublica competed for the following positions.

| Polling firm | Link | Fieldwork date | Sample size | Margin of error | Polling method | Ädilet | Auyl | Aq Jol | Respublica | QHP | JSDP | Baytaq | Against all | Undecided | Lead |
|---|---|---|---|---|---|---|---|---|---|---|---|---|---|---|---|
| Institute of Democracy | | 20 July–6 August 2026 | 8,000 | ± 1.1 | Face-to-Face | 70.3 | 5.6 | 5.0 | 4.9 | 3.9 | 4.2 | 0.6 | 1.6 | 3.9 | 64.7 |
| Kazakhstan Institute of Social Development | | 21 July–4 August 2026 | 1,200 | ± 2.8 | Telephone | 70.2 | 5.6 | 4.9 | 4.7 | 3.3 | 4.5 | 0.8 | 1.5 | 1.3 | 64.6 |
| Public Policy Institute | | 7–27 July 2026 | 8,000 | ± 1.2 | Face-to-Face | 67.3 | 6.2 | 4.8 | 5.5 | 3.9 | 4.3 | 1.1 | 1.6 | 5.3 | 61.1 |
| Eurasian Integration Institute | | 16–26 July 2026 | 4,000 | ± 1.5 | Face-to-Face | 65.1 | 5.9 | 4.7 | 4.6 | 4.1 | 4.2 | 0.5 | 2.5 | 8.4 | 59.2 |
| Kazakhstan Institute of Social Development | | 8–20 July 2026 | 1,200 | ± 2.8 | Telephone | 64.8 | 5.4 | 4.7 | 4.8 | 3.1 | 3.3 | 0.8 | 2.2 | 10.9 | 59.4 |
| Eurasian Integration Institute | | 3–13 July 2026 | 1,640 | ± 1.2 | Face-to-Face | 61.7 | 5.1 | 4.1 | 4.5 | 3.6 | 3.5 | 0.7 | 2.6 | 14.2 | 56.6 |
| DATAMetrics | | 13 June–2 July 2026 | 8,000 | ± 2.8 | Face-to-Face | 54.2 | 7.3 | 4.6 | 3.4 | 2.1 | 2.4 | 1.1 | 2.3 | 22.6 | 46.9 |
| 2023 election | | 19 March 2023 | 6,366,441 | — | — | 53.9 (Note: Before Amanat merged into Ädilet) | 10.9 | 8.4 | 6.8 | 8.6 | 5.2 | 2.3 | 3.9 | — | 43 |

=== Exit polls ===
Exit polls released at 00:00 UTC+05:00 on 24 August indicated that the support for Ädilet was projected to hover between 70% and 72%, while the People's Party and Baytaq were projected to not enter the Kurultai.

| Polling firm | Link | Ädilet | Auyl | Aq Jol | Respublica | QHP | JSDP | Baytaq | Against all |
|---|---|---|---|---|---|---|---|---|---|
| Eurasian Integration Institute | | 71.8 | 6.4 | 5.1 | 5.4 | 3.0 | 5.2 | 1.0 | 2.1 |
| SOCIS-A | | 70.7 | 6.4 | 5.4 | 5.5 | 3.2 | 5.0 | 1.2 | 2.6 |
| Public Policy Institute | | 72.3 | 6.2 | 5.1 | 5.2 | 2.8 | 5.0 | 0.9 | 2.5 |

== Results ==
On 24 August 2026, the CEC announced preliminary results showing that Ädilet won 71.17% of the vote, followed by Auyl with 6.26%, Respublica with 5.56%, Aq Jol with 5.21%, and the Nationwide Social Democratic Party (JSDP) with 5.11%, while the People's Party of Kazakhstan (QHP) and Baytaq received 3.11% and 1.07%, respectively, with turnout reaching 73.8% as 9,351,539 of 12,623,289 registered voters participated. Five parties therefore cleared the 5% electoral threshold and were eligible for representation in the 145-seat Kurultai, while the QHP and Baytaq fell below the threshold.

The CEC announced the final results on 25 August, confirming the preliminary results and allocating 110 seats to Ädilet, 10 to Auyl, nine to Respublica, and eight each to Aq Jol and the JSDP, while the QHP and Baytaq received no mandate after failing to cross the electoral threshold. 74.1% (9,351,539) of registered voters participated in the election, about 224,000 more voters than in the March 2026 constitutional referendum. The result also marked the first absence of the left-wing QHP from the national legislature since it originally entered the lower house Mäjılıs as the Communist People's Party of Kazakhstan in 2012.

| Party | Votes | % | Seats | +/– |
|---|---|---|---|---|
| Ädilet | 6,528,948 | 71.17 | 110 | New |
| Auyl | 574,621 | 6.26 | 10 | +2 |
| Respublica | 509,631 | 5.56 | 9 | +3 |
| Aq Jol | 478,083 | 5.21 | 8 | +2 |
| Nationwide Social Democratic Party | 469,058 | 5.11 | 8 | +4 |
| People's Party of Kazakhstan | 285,395 | 3.11 | 0 | –5 |
| Baytaq | 97,751 | 1.07 | 0 | 0 |
| Against all | 230,446 | 2.51 | – | – |
| Total | 9,173,933 | 100.00 | 145 | +47 |
| Valid votes | 9,173,933 | 98.10 | | |
| Invalid/blank votes | 177,606 | 1.90 | | |
| Total votes | 9,351,539 | 100.00 | | |
| Registered voters/turnout | 12,623,289 | 74.08 | | |
Source: CEC

Party vote share
| Ädilet | 71.17% |
| Auyl | 6.26% |
| Respublica | 5.56% |
| Aq Jol | 5.21% |
| JSDP | 5.11% |
| QHP | 3.11% |
| Baytaq | 1.07% |
| Against all | 2.51% |

Seat share
| Ädilet | 75.86% |
| Auyl | 6.90% |
| Respublica | 6.21% |
| Aq Jol | 5.52% |
| JSDP | 5.52% |

=== Voter turnout ===
Final turnout reached 74.19%, the highest turnout in a Kazakh legislative election since 2016, and exceeding the previous five-year record of 73.12% recorded at the 2026 referendum; turnout was highest in Turkistan Region (92.16%) and lowest in Almaty (43.23%).

According to the Ministry of Foreign Affairs, 9,623 Kazakh citizens voted at 79 polling stations abroad in 61 countries, representing 84.4% of registered overseas voters.

The Ministry of Culture and Information later reported that around 4 million young people participated in the election, including first-time voters and those aged 25–35.

| Region | Time (percentage point changes relative to the 2023 election) | | | | | |
| Region | 10:00 | 12:00 | 14:00 | 16:00 | 18:00 | 20:00 |
| Kazakhstan | 2,264,411 (17.96%) (+3.75 pp) | 4,670,816 (37.05%) (+6.40 pp) | 6,696,002 (53.12%) (+6.28 pp) | 8,240,336 (65.37%) (+13.39 pp) | 9,095,298 (72.15%) (+18.03 pp) | 9,352,151 (74.19%) (+20.00 pp) |
|---|---|---|---|---|---|---|
| Abai Region | 17.35% | 38.51% | 63.07% | 71.18% | 77.54% | 81.41% |
| Akmola Region | 18.91% | 39.57% | 61.15% | 73.69% | 78.95% | 82.69% |
| Aktobe Region | 20.28% | 42.53% | 60.87% | 75.63% | 84.95% | 88.30% |
| Almaty Region | 17.19% | 39.05% | 54.57% | 67.23% | 70.04% | 71.17% |
| Atyrau Region | 18.75% | 35.84% | 54.49% | 63.37% | 69.05% | 70.74% |
| West Kazakhstan Region | 17.97% | 35.49% | 50.21% | 61.81% | 71.15% | 73.38% |
| Jambyl Region | 18.25% | 35.54% | 50.58% | 69.11% | 83.99% | 85.18% |
| Jetisu Region | 20.87% | 47.29% | 62.89% | 77.03% | 89.69% | 91.19% |
| Karaganda Region | 21.06% | 40.56% | 62.79% | 70.91% | 74.78% | 76.28% |
| Kostanay Region | 17.92% | 34.72% | 55.86% | 70.09% | 75.31% | 76.47% |
| Kyzylorda Region | 22.91% | 47.59% | 64.22% | 81.38% | 88.09% | 90.75% |
| Mangystau Region | 16.92% | 34.68% | 50.65% | 65.86% | 70.61% | 71.38% |
| Pavlodar Region | 15.98% | 35.74% | 54.01% | 67.06% | 69.99% | 71.20% |
| North Kazakhstan Region | 17.52% | 38.13% | 58.63% | 63.94% | 75.14% | 77.31% |
| Turkistan Region | 20.39% | 43.14% | 57.72% | 76.73% | 90.17% | 92.16% |
| Ulytau Region | 19.41% | 34.93% | 53.31% | 64.29% | 68.23% | 70.72% |
| East Kazakhstan Region | 19.93% | 41.89% | 61.10% | 79.33% | 85.43% | 87.50% |
| Astana | 17.01% | 35.28% | 40.92% | 46.38% | 49.87% | 51.67% |
| Almaty | 9.96% | 17.87% | 30.36% | 36.65% | 41.06% | 43.23% |
| Shymkent | 20.39% | 41.60% | 55.32% | 67.92% | 71.89% | 75.42% |

=== Results by region ===
Party list vote share by region
| Region | Registered voters | Turnout (%) | Ädilet | | Auyl | | Respublica | | Aq Jol | | JSDP | | QHP | | Baytaq | | Against all | | Invalid/ blank |
| Region | Registered voters | Turnout (%) | Votes | % | Votes | % | Votes | % | Votes | % | Votes | % | Votes | % | Votes | % | Votes | % | Invalid/ blank |
|---|---|---|---|---|---|---|---|---|---|---|---|---|---|---|---|---|---|---|---|
| Abai Region | 402,920 | 81.26% | 247,657 | 76.71% | 17,964 | 5.56% | 6,346 | 1.97% | 15,365 | 4.76% | 14,665 | 4.54% | 8,437 | 2.61% | 6,581 | 2.04% | 5,850 | 1.81% | 4,544 |
| Aqmola Region | 519,083 | 82.54% | 306,074 | 72.52% | 21,673 | 5.13% | 24,997 | 5.92% | 21,627 | 5.12% | 16,698 | 3.96% | 15,064 | 3.57% | 2,854 | 0.68% | 13,082 | 3.10% | 6,363 |
| Aqtöbe Region | 578,620 | 88.15% | 339,719 | 68.23% | 34,418 | 6.91% | 22,501 | 4.52% | 41,163 | 8.27% | 25,135 | 5.05% | 14,672 | 2.95% | 7,112 | 1.43% | 13,150 | 2.64% | 12,169 |
| Almaty Region | 1,044,072 | 71.03% | 521,710 | 72.25% | 53,732 | 7.44% | 27,493 | 3.81% | 36,712 | 5.08% | 34,054 | 4.72% | 17,255 | 2.39% | 5,437 | 0.75% | 25,681 | 3.56% | 19,515 |
| Atyrau Region | 428,722 | 70.57% | 199,873 | 67.39% | 24,186 | 8.16% | 14,252 | 4.81% | 16,238 | 5.48% | 15,310 | 5.16% | 15,341 | 5.17% | 4,521 | 1.52% | 6,849 | 2.31% | 5,992 |
| West Kazakhstan Region | 451,048 | 73.25% | 207,153 | 64.52% | 18,736 | 5.84% | 26,417 | 8.23% | 22,184 | 6.91% | 14,398 | 4.48% | 18,597 | 5.79% | 3,042 | 0.95% | 10,530 | 3.28% | 9,335 |
| Jambyl Region | 730,834 | 85.07% | 434,207 | 70.89% | 49,203 | 8.03% | 36,311 | 5.93% | 24,784 | 4.05% | 31,562 | 5.15% | 17,039 | 2.78% | 5,240 | 0.86% | 14,135 | 2.31% | 9,250 |
| Jetisu Region | 443,716 | 91.05% | 311,254 | 78.25% | 20,184 | 5.07% | 16,563 | 4.16% | 17,449 | 4.39% | 13,595 | 3.42% | 8,659 | 2.18% | 4,275 | 1.07% | 5,794 | 1.46% | 6,211 |
| Qarağandy Region | 759,507 | 76.12% | 365,368 | 64.39% | 30,569 | 5.39% | 45,156 | 7.96% | 54,212 | 9.55% | 27,031 | 4.76% | 18,325 | 3.23% | 9,279 | 1.64% | 17,461 | 3.08% | 10,756 |
| Qostanai Region | 540,782 | 76.36% | 267,190 | 65.87% | 16,521 | 4.07% | 37,648 | 9.28% | 29,486 | 7.27% | 21,240 | 5.24% | 17,682 | 4.36% | 2,537 | 0.63% | 13,298 | 3.28% | 7,361 |
| Qyzylorda Region | 501,098 | 90.62% | 334,937 | 75.09% | 24,385 | 5.47% | 21,009 | 4.71% | 11,745 | 2.63% | 25,074 | 5.62% | 15,176 | 3.40% | 5,986 | 1.34% | 7,742 | 1.74% | 8,025 |
| Mangystau Region | 458,317 | 71.23% | 223,412 | 70.28% | 13,357 | 4.20% | 17,385 | 5.47% | 20,370 | 6.41% | 21,989 | 6.92% | 5,062 | 1.59% | 4,559 | 1.43% | 11,761 | 3.70% | 8,566 |
| Pavlodar Region | 503,621 | 71.06% | 258,354 | 73.47% | 21,782 | 6.19% | 13,107 | 3.73% | 22,145 | 6.30% | 14,537 | 4.13% | 12,507 | 3.56% | 3,752 | 1.07% | 5,454 | 1.55% | 6,212 |
| North Kazakhstan Region | 365,666 | 77.10% | 182,623 | 65.93% | 14,336 | 5.18% | 20,678 | 7.47% | 17,506 | 6.32% | 17,019 | 6.14% | 12,056 | 4.35% | 4,630 | 1.67% | 8,149 | 2.94% | 4,915 |
| Türkistan Region | 1,206,231 | 92.02% | 887,905 | 80.82% | 86,181 | 7.84% | 16,631 | 1.51% | 21,429 | 1.95% | 54,997 | 5.01% | 12,371 | 1.13% | 6,285 | 0.57% | 12,874 | 1.17% | 11,302 |
| Ulytau Region | 138,586 | 70.51% | 61,754 | 64.93% | 8,502 | 8.94% | 6,506 | 6.84% | 5,490 | 5.77% | 4,151 | 4.36% | 4,413 | 4.64% | 1,349 | 1.42% | 2,957 | 3.11% | 2,600 |
| East Kazakhstan Region | 486,477 | 87.32% | 296,491 | 71.64% | 25,559 | 6.18% | 19,486 | 4.71% | 18,925 | 4.57% | 23,758 | 5.74% | 12,468 | 3.01% | 3,814 | 0.92% | 13,372 | 3.23% | 10,942 |
| Astana | 1,017,030 | 52.11% | 343,095 | 65.70% | 29,265 | 5.60% | 45,560 | 8.72% | 33,791 | 6.47% | 35,167 | 6.73% | 20,401 | 3.91% | 7,035 | 1.35% | 7,924 | 1.52% | 7,722 |
| Almaty | 1,332,205 | 43.07% | 317,529 | 57.23% | 41,761 | 7.53% | 66,214 | 11.93% | 30,764 | 5.54% | 35,230 | 6.35% | 28,478 | 5.13% | 8,694 | 1.57% | 26,186 | 4.72% | 18,948 |
| Shymkent | 714,754 | 75.23% | 422,643 | 79.62% | 22,307 | 4.20% | 25,371 | 4.78% | 16,698 | 3.15% | 23,448 | 4.42% | 11,392 | 2.15% | 769 | 0.14% | 8,197 | 1.54% | 6,888 |
| Kazakhstan | 12,623,289 | 74.08% | 6,528,948 | 69.82% | 574,621 | 6.14% | 509,631 | 5.11% | 548,272 | 5.86% | 469,058 | 5.02% | 285,395 | 3.05% | 97,751 | 1.05% | 230,446 | 2.67% | 177,616 |

== Aftermath ==
=== Analysis ===
Political analysts and experts argued that the return to a nationwide party-list proportional representation system and the establishment of the unicameral Kurultai strengthened executive control and limited political competition. Political analyst Temur Umarov of the Carnegie Russia Eurasia Center said the system gave the authorities greater control over candidate selection and made the Kurultai more manageable for the executive, while arguing that the election primarily served to preserve political stability and elite continuity rather than initiate major democratic reforms. Luca Anceschi of the University of Glasgow similarly viewed the elections as contributing to the consolidation of Tokayev's power, while former senator Zauresh Battalova criticized the limited scope for genuine political choice under the new system. Stefania Kolyaj of the Polish Institute of International Affairs likewise described the election as a formal consolidation of Tokayev's power and argued that the newly formed Kurultai would have little influence over state policy. Polish political analyst Wojciech Górecki of the Centre for Eastern Studies argued that the elections, despite their routine character, demonstrated the balance of power within Kazakhstan's ruling camp and confirmed the dominance of the presidential center of power, with the shift to a unicameral parliament potentially making the legislature easier for the executive to manage. Catherine Putz of The Diplomat similarly argued that the election represented institutional change without a corresponding shift in the balance of political power, pointing to Ädilet's absorption of the former ruling Amanat party and the continued dominance of pro-presidential forces. Political scientist Tolğanai Ümbetälieva of the Central Asian Foundation for the Development of Democracy similarly argued that, unlike the previous 8th Parliament of Kazakhstan, which could at times oppose the president, the new Kurultai was effectively under presidential control.

Political scientist Dosym Satbaev argued that the election offered limited political choice, with the participating parties largely pro-government, and questioned the credibility of the official turnout figures due to the lack of independent exit polls. He also linked the election to broader discussions over the future transfer of power and President Tokayev's possible decision to seek another presidential term before 2029.

Political scientist Qazybek Maigeldinov attributed the People's Party of Kazakhstan's poor performance to increased competition among left-wing parties for socially oriented voters and the declining appeal of its Soviet-associated ideological platform, arguing that its nostalgic appeal was increasingly limited to older generations as Gen Z in Kazakhstan, with little connection to the country's communist past, developed different political views and orientations.

Analysts also argued that the election would reinforce Kazakhstan's existing multi-vector foreign policy rather than produce a major shift in its external relations. Jennifer Brick Murtazashvili of the Carnegie Endowment for International Peace described Tokayev's approach as "portfolio politics", involving the allocation of different roles to Russia, China, the European Union, and the United States, while noting that the strengthened presidential control could give the government greater latitude in managing these relationships.

=== Reactions ===
Tokayev praised the elections as "successfully and impeccably organized", thanking voters, observers, and the Central Election Commission for their role in the process.

The Baytaq party initially disputed the exit poll results and alleged violations at polling stations, saying it would seek to establish the "real results" through legal procedures. Party leader Azamathan Ämirtai later asserted he had no confirmed evidence to question the voters' choice and would respect the official results established by law. Representatives of the party's West Kazakhstan, Karaganda, and Aktobe branches likewise said they respected the voters' choice and accepted the preliminary results, while the latter two called for an internal review of the party's campaign and organizational methods.

Following its electoral defeat and failure to win any seats, the People's Party of Kazakhstan (QHP) chairman Nursultan Şoqanov recognized the results as objective and said the party was ready to work constructively with other political forces and continue its political activities. Former party chairman and adviser Ermukhamet Ertisbaev, a longtime senior political figure who had resigned as QHP chairman in June, admitted the party's programme of "Kazakhstani socialism" had failed to gain sufficient mass support and announced his retirement from active politics, saying he would focus on international affairs and education.

==== International reactions ====
Countries

- Russia: President Vladimir Putin congratulated Tokayev on the election and said the turnout and results demonstrated public support for the course pursued under Tokayev's leadership toward Kazakhstan's development, greater internal political stability and economic progress.
- Uzbekistan: President Shavkat Mirziyoyev congratulated Tokayev on the successful first election to the unicameral Kurultai and expressed confidence that the new legislature would advance Kazakhstan's reforms, provide legislative support for major transformations and give new impetus to sustainable development.
- Azerbaijan: President Ilham Aliyev congratulated Tokayev and the Kazakh people on the successful election, describing it as the beginning of a new historical chapter in Kazakhstan's sociopolitical life and expressing confidence that it would support the country's development and continuation of Tokayev's reforms.
- Kyrgyzstan: President Sadyr Japarov congratulated Tokayev and the Kazakh people, saying that the newly elected Kurultai had the potential to strengthen Kazakhstan's statehood and develop its sociopolitical and legal institutions.
- Tajikistan: President Emomali Rahmon congratulated Tokayev on the successful conduct of the Kurultai elections and emphasized the importance of continued Tajikistan–Kazakhstan cooperation and the development of bilateral relations.
- Belarus: President Alexander Lukashenko congratulated Tokayev on the election and expressed confidence in the continued development of relations between Belarus and Kazakhstan.
- Armenia: Prime Minister Nikol Pashinyan congratulated Tokayev on the successful election and said the convincing results demonstrated broad public support for Tokayev's reform course.
- Turkmenistan: President Serdar Berdimuhamedov congratulated Tokayev on the successful election and described the first Kurultai election as an important step in implementing reforms aimed at improving Kazakhstan's system of state power and governance.
- Turkey: President Recep Tayyip Erdoğan congratulated Tokayev and said the high voter turnout was an indication of public support for the reforms being pursued in Kazakhstan.
- Georgia: Prime Minister Irakli Kobakhidze congratulated Tokayev and the Kazakh people on the first Kurultai election and expressed confidence that the election would contribute to Kazakhstan's continued development, stability, prosperity and the well-being of its people.
- Serbia: President Aleksandar Vučić congratulated Tokayev on the successful election and highlighted strong public support for his reform agenda.
- Pakistan: President Asif Ali Zardari congratulated Tokayev and the Kazakh people on the successful completion of the Kurultai election, commended public participation in the political process, and expressed his best wishes for the newly elected legislature.
- United Arab Emirates: President Mohamed bin Zayed Al Nahyan congratulated Tokayev on the successful election and conveyed his wishes for Kazakhstan's continued development and prosperity.
- Israel: Prime Minister Benjamin Netanyahu congratulated Tokayev on the election and expressed his wishes for Kazakhstan's continued stability and development.
- Myanmar: President Min Aung Hlaing congratulated Tokayev on the successful conduct of the Kurultai election and conveyed his wishes for Kazakhstan's continued development.

International organizations

- European Union: The EU welcomed the election's orderly organization and participation while noting OSCE/ODIHR concerns over limited political and media pluralism, electoral shortcomings, voting and counting violations, and discrepancies in reported turnout, and urged Kazakhstan to continue democratic reforms concerning human rights, the rule of law and democratic governance.
- Commonwealth of Independent States: The CIS observer mission characterized the election as well organized, fair, competitive and open, stating that it enabled citizens to freely express their will and that observers were provided with conditions to work in accordance with international standards.

=== Opening session of the 1st Kurultai ===
On 26 August 2026, Tokayev signed a decree convening the first session of the Kurultai of the first convocation for 28 August. On 27 August, the CEC registered the newly 145 elected deputies, formally beginning their mandate powers.

During the first opening session, Tokayev outlined the Kurultai's priorities, including updating legislation to conform with the new constitution and ensuring the stability and quality of lawmaking following the abolition of the Senate. He also called on the Kurultai to prioritize main legislation proposed by the government that would prohibit Kazakh children under 16 from registering on social media platforms. Tokayev nominated Aibek Dädebai, leader of Ädilet, as chairman of the Kurultai, and 144 deputies subsequently elected him unanimously by secret ballot. The Kurultai then approved three deputy chairmen and established eight standing parliamentary committees.

=== Government formation ===
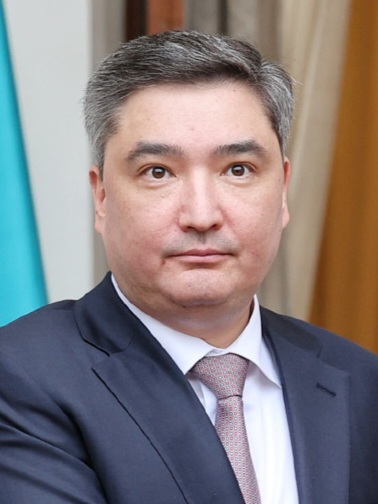
Oljas Bektenov was reappointed prime minister for a second term in August 2026

On 23 August 2026, Tokayev announced that the government would resign following the formation of the new Kurultai, as required by the new constitution, and that personnel changes would be made to give renewed impetus to its work, while stressing that these would not constitute dismissals for their own sake. On 28 August, Tokayev signed a decree accepting the government's resignation, with Prime Minister Oljas Bektenov and other members of the cabinet continuing to perform their duties until the approval of a new composition.

On 31 August, Tokayev nominated Bektenov for reappointment as prime minister, describing him as an experienced and qualified statesman who had performed effectively as prime minister. The Kurultai approved his candidacy by a vote of 137–0, with seven abstentions, following which Tokayev formally reappointed Bektenov as prime minister and formed the Second Bektenov Government. After his reappointment, Bektenov said the government would support Kazakhstan's development and the political changes initiated by Tokayev. Tokayev subsequently outlined priorities for the Bektenov's government, including economic growth, effective governance, and public welfare.

== See also ==
- 2026 Kazakh constitutional referendum
- 8th Parliament of Kazakhstan, the outgoing Parliament
- 1st Kurultai, the incoming Parliament
