= Nurlan Äuesbaev 2022 presidential campaign =

Nurlan Äuesbaev for President 2022
- Campaigned for: 2022 Kazakh presidential election
- Candidate: Nurlan Äuesbaev; Leader of the Nationwide Social Democratic Party in Astana (2021–present)
- Affiliation: JSDP
- Status: Announced; 1 October 2022; Official nominee 1 October 2022; Lost election 21 November 2022
- Headquarters: Astana
- Key people: Ashat Raqymjanov (chief of staff)
- Slogan: Еркіндік. Әділдік. Ынтымақ! ("Freedom, Justice, Solidarity!")

Nurlan Äuesbaev was confirmed as a candidate on 1 October 2022 by the Nationwide Social Democratic Party (JSDP), the only registered oppositional party in Kazakhstan which for the first contested the presidential election since its formation as Äuesbaev headed the JSDP's branch in the capital city of Astana. Äuesbaev's candidacy was then submitted to the Central Election Commission (CEC) for evaluation on 7 October, and from there passed a series of qualification process including the state language exam for Kazakh where he was declared as fluent on 10 October in by the linguistic commission and led for the CEC subsequently issuing a compliancy for Äuesbaev. Äuesbaev himself then began gathering supported signatures for his campaign, leading to him submitting a total of 120,908 signatures on 20 October, followed by his CEC registration as a candidate for the election.

== Background ==
Upon President Kassym-Jomart Tokayev's decision in holding a snap 2022 presidential election, several speculations arose regarding the Kazakh political opposition's stance for the race with political scientist Andrei Chebotarev alluding to possible scenarios for the opposition either yielding their single nominee as it happened in 2005, boycotting polls as protest, or a potential fractured disunity between opposition that would in turn lead to vote splitting which favours the interests of the Kazakh government. Chebotarev also suggested for the registered opposition Nationwide Social Democratic Party (JSDP) to field its nominee as a way to earn popularity and increase its future campaigning opportunities, naming 2019 presidential candidate Amirjan Qosanov as a potential candidate due to him being one of the JSDP's founders, although noting the party's lack of "suitable candidates" in which one of them would have to be "ideologically close" to the interests of JSDP.

=== Nomination ===
On 27 September 2022, following Tokayev's signed presidential decree of the election date, the JSDP political council at the meeting announced its holding of the 19th Extraordinary Congress to address the upcoming election campaign. At the congress held on 1 October 2022 in Astana, the JSDP announced its intent for the first time since the party's creation in 2006 to take part in a presidential election with the participating delegates unanimously voting for the nomination of Nurlan Äuesbaev, the chairman of the JSDP's Astana party branch. From there, Äuesbaev submitted his election documents to the Central Election Commission (CEC) on 7 October.

=== Registration ===
Äuesbaev in his early campaign stage went through a series of qualifications beginning with the linguistic exam for Kazakh on 10 October 2022, to which the commission overseeing him unanimously found him fluent in. From there, the CEC issued a compliancy for him which allowed for Äuesbaev to begin collecting signatures in support for final registration. During that period, a press conference scheduled for 14 October in Marden Business Center from where Äuesbaev and his supporters were set to announce interim results of the pre-campaign activities became disrupted due to alleged emergency work in the center, resulting in it taking place remotely with JSDP chairman Ashat Raqymjanov accusing government pressure behind the incident. The JSDP had also revealed that Äuesbaev had already garnered approximately 84% of the required number of signatures.

On 20 October, Äuesbaev reporting to the CEC was shown to have collected a total of 120,908 signatures from 15 regions of Kazakhstan with 119,197 of them being deemed as valid, allowing for Äuesbaev to be officially registered as a candidate. While Raqymjanov claimed that the territorial election commissions had withheld some of the collected signatures under various "preconditions".

== Campaign ==
On 21 October 2022, the republican campaign headquarters in support for Äuesbaev held a meeting to which it was attended by members of the JSDP political council and community activists, with party chairman Ashat Raqymjanov being elected as the chief of staff. From there, it was revealed that Äuesbaev had departed for Karaganda Region where he would begin his campaign trail.

== Election program ==
A full text of Äuesbaev's election programme was made public on 27 October 2022, under a motto of "Freedom, Justice, Solidarity!" (Kazakh: Еркіндік. Әділдік. Ынтымақ!) that called for a "socially responsible order" under the values of social democracy by which any decision would be made in favour of citizens:

Political reforms and anti-corruption measures

- Reduction in the president's power;
- Abolishment of the Senate with an increased number of seats to a unicameral Parliament;
- Right to form government be reserved to only Mäjilis with the president approving cabinet via ceremonially;
- Mixed-member proportional representation of the Mäjilis elected composition be 50% proportionally and 50% single-member district;
- Mandatory income and expenditure declarations of legislators and officials at all levels of government;
- Support and protection for media covering anti-corruption investigations;
- Maximum prison sentencing for corruption crimes without parole.

Combatting oligarchy

- Detailed probes and return of offshore assets
- Redistribution of assets from large businessmen to medium-sized entrepreneurs;
- Gradual nationalization of natural resource industries;
- Increased corporate taxes;
- Breakup of the Samruk-Kazyna wealth fund into smaller industry state holdings;
- Improved competition law.

Social policies

- Introduction of the Quality of Life Standard of Kazakhstanis;
- Funding for healthcare and education from 5–7% of the GDP;
- Increased constructions of schools and hospitals;
- Revisal of housing programs;
- Criminal justice reform.

Foreign politics

- Nonparticipation in "aggressive military blocs";
- Commitment to nuclear disarmament and demilitarisation;
- Moderate form of protectionism;
- Maintaining status of a neutral country.
