= Nursultan Şoqanov =

Kazakh politician (born 1986)

Nūrsūltan Şoqanov
- Нұрсұлтан Шоқанов
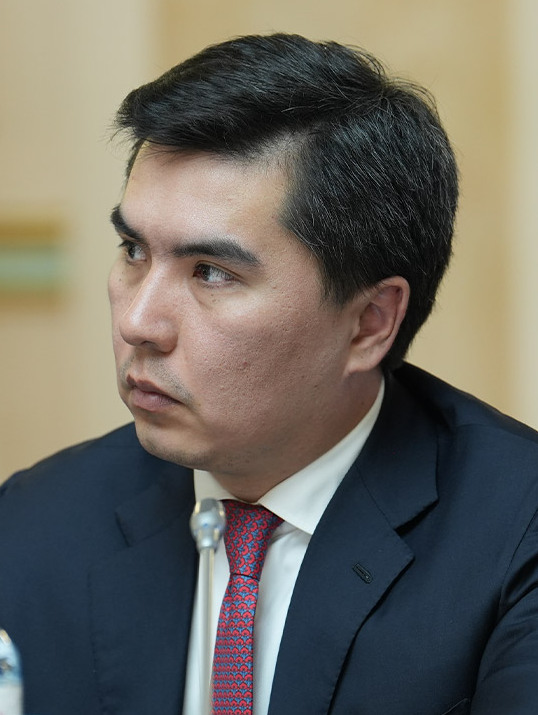
- Şoqanov in 2025

Chairman of the People's Party of Kazakhstan
- Incumbent
- Assumed office 27 June 2026
- Preceded by: Ermukhamet Ertisbaev

Head of the People's Party of Kazakhstan branches in Almaty and Almaty Region
- In office 20 December 2022 – 27 June 2026
- Preceded by: Tamerlan Sultanğaliev
- Succeeded by: Beibit Qusaiynov

Member of the Almaty City Mäslihat
- In office 14 January 2021 – 30 September 2025
- Party List: QHP

Personal details
- Born: 20 January 1986 (age 40) Alma-Ata, Alma-Ata Oblast, Kazakh SSR, Soviet Union
- Party: QHP
- Education: KIMEP University; IMD Business School
- Occupation: Politician; financier; business manager

Nūrsūltan Nūrlanūly Şoqanov (Note: Often transliterated as Nursultan Nurlanovich Shokanov through a Russified Romanization of Нурсултан Нурланович Шоканов.) (Kazakh Cyrillic: Нұрсұлтан Нұрланұлы Шоқанов; born 20 January 1986) is a Kazakh politician and financier who serves as the Chairman of the People's Party of Kazakhstan since June 2026.

== Early life and education ==
Şoqanov was born on 20 January 1986 in Almaty.

He studied finance at the KIMEP University. He later received an Executive MBA from Switzerland's IMD Business School.

== Business career ==
Since 2009, Şoqanov does business. He began his career at the professional services company Ernst & Young. His other employers included the Sandrilling JSC and the Atameken Chamber.

== Political career ==
From 2021 to 2025, Şoqanov served as deputy of the Almaty City Mäslihat of the 7th and 8th convocations. Since 2022, he was also the regional branch head of the People's Party of Kazakhstan (QHP) in Almaty.

On the extraordinary congress of the People's Party of 27 June 2026, Chairman Ermukhamet Ertisbaev resigns and Şoqanov is elected to be his successor. During the following 2026 Kazakh legislative election, the QHP loses its parliamentary representation, gaining just 3.19% of the vote.

== Personal life ==
Since 2023, he hass been the President of the Federation of Mountaineering and Sport Rock Climbing.
