= Ermukhamet Ertisbaev =

Kazakhstani politician and diplomat (born 1956)

- Ермұхамет Ертісбаев
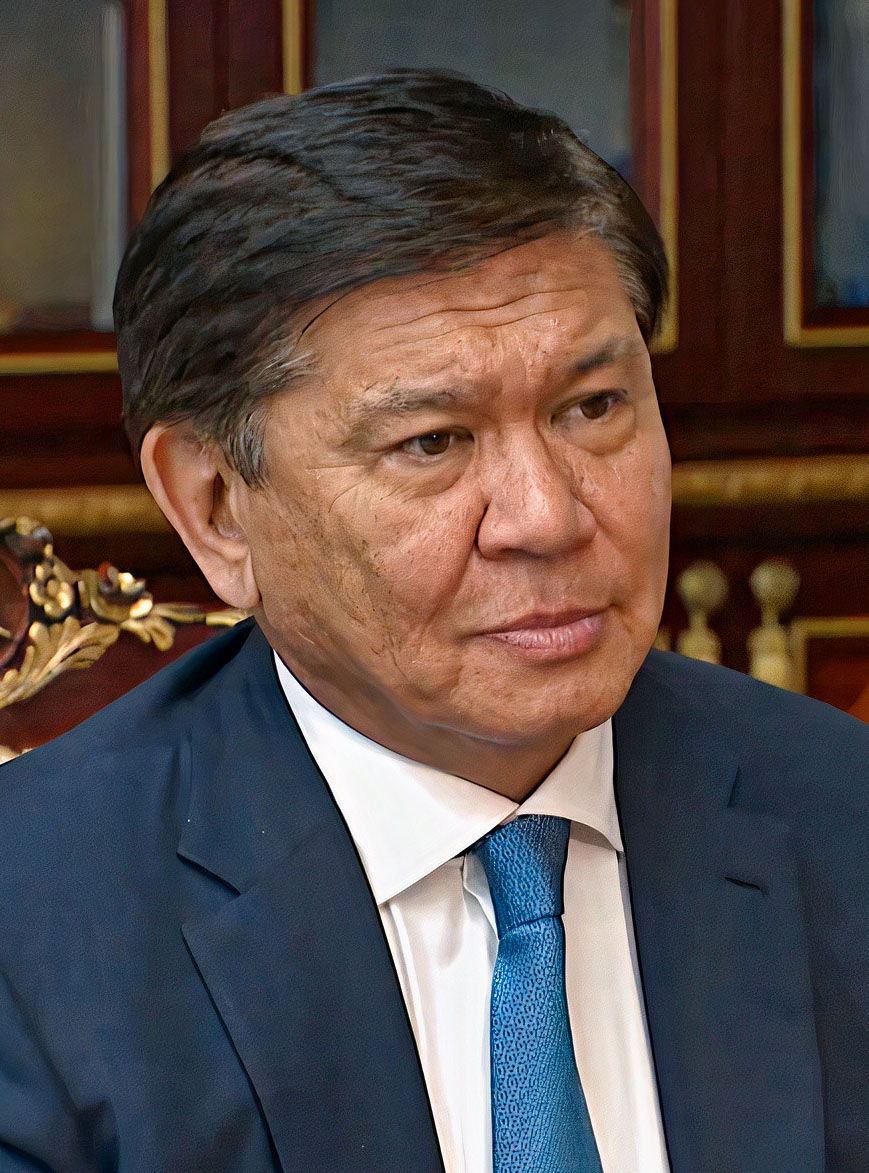
- Ertisbaev in 2019

Minister of Culture and Information
- In office 18 January 2006 – 12 May 2008
- President: Nursultan Nazarbayev
- Prime Minister: Daniyal Akhmetov; Karim Massimov
- Preceded by: Esetjan Kosubaev (Culture, Information and Sports)
- Succeeded by: Mukhtar Kul-Mukhammed

Member of the Supreme Council of Kazakhstan
- In office 25 March 1990 – 12 December 1993
- Constituency: 105th Lenin

Chairman of the People's Party
- In office 27 March 2022 – 27 June 2026
- First Deputy: Aiqyn Qongyrov
- Preceded by: Aiqyn Qongyrov
- Succeeded by: Nursultan Şoqanov

Personal details
- Born: 19 November 1956 (age 69) Karaganda, Kazakh SSR, Soviet Union
- Party: People's Party (2022–present)
- Other political affiliations: Amanat (2007–2022); Socialist Party (from 1991); QKP (until 1991)
- Spouse: Lyudmila Ertisbaeva
- Children: 1
- Education: Karagandy State University

Ermūhamet Qabidenūly Ertısbaev (Note: Often transliterated as Yermukhamet Kabidinovich Yertysbayev through a Russified Romanization of Ермухамет Кабидинович Ертысбаев.) (Kazakh: Ермұхамет Қабиденұлы Ертісбаев, [jeɾmo̙χɑmʲet qɑbɯjdʲeno̙ɫɯ jeɾtɘsbɑjəf]; born 19 November 1956) is a Kazakh former politician and diplomat who has served as the chairman of the People's Party of Kazakhstan from 2022 to 2026. Prior to that, he served as the Kazakh ambassador to Belarus from November 2017 to August 2019 and to Georgia from April 2013 to November 2017.

Ertisbaev worked in several governmental ministries of Culture, Information which was split in March 2006 with Ertisbaev being appointed as a Culture and Information. He was also a member of the Supreme Soviet of the Kazakh SSR from 1990 to 1994 and has served in President Nursultan Nazarbayev's administration where he had been called as Nazarbayev's "wily political adviser."

== Biography ==
=== Early life and career ===
Ertisbaev was born on 19 November 1956 in the city of Karaganda. In 1978, he graduated from Karaganda State University from the Faculty of History. Ertisbaev is a candidate of historical sciences and holds a doctorate in political science.

After graduating, Ertisbaev from 1978 onwards was engaged in research and teaching activities as he worked as an assistant at the Zhezkazgan Pedagogical Institute, secretary of the Komsomol Committee, teacher at the Karaganda Cooperative Institute, and the head of the Department of Political History of the Karaganda Medical Institute. From 1982 to 1986, he was an intern-teacher and a post-graduate student of Moscow State University. During that time, Ertisbaev served in the Soviet Army within the communications company in the Baltic Military District.

=== Political and diplomatic career ===
In 1990, Ertisbaev was elected to the 12th convocation of the Supreme Soviet of the Kazakh SSR from the 105th Lenin electoral district in Karaganda. During his tenure as a legislator, he served in the Committee for the Development of Science and Public Education. He was also an acting secretary of the Committee on Deputy Powers and Deputy Ethics from July 1991.

As the Communist Party of Kazakhstan was dissolved in September 1991, Ertisbaev who previously was a party member, became a co-chairman of the newly formed Socialist Party of Kazakhstan (SP) and was the SP's secretary of Political Executive Committee from April 1994.

Since Kazakhstan's independence, Ertisbaev held a close relationship with President Nursultan Nazarbayev. He has served under Nazarbayev's administration by being director of the Kazakhstan Institute for Strategic Studies under the President from April 1998 until becoming the head of the socio-political department in May 2000. Ertisbaev simultaneously worked as a presidential advisor to Nazarbayev from 1995 to 1998, 2002 to 2006, and 2008 to 2013 respectively.

On 18 January 2006, Ertisbaev was appointed as a Culture, Information, and Sports Minister in Daniyal Akhmetov's government where he served briefly until President Nazarbayev split the Ministry of Culture, Information and Sport into a Culture and Information Ministry and a Tourism and Sport Ministry through a decree on 27 March 2006. Nazarbayev appointed Ertisbaev the Minister of Culture and Information and Temirkhan Dosmukhanbetov the Minister of Tourism and Sport. On 12 May 2008, Ertisbaev was dismissed from the post as he was appointed as presidential advisor and was succeeded by Mukhtar Kul-Mukhammed.

It became known on 3 April 2013 that Ertisbaev was appointed as a Kazakh ambassador to Georgia. Prior to that, the KazTAG on 22 February reported that he would be transferred to the post which Ertisbaev himself at that time had no knowledge of, asserting in a phone interview that he had heard the news only for the first time.

==== Kazakh ambassador to Belarus and brief retirement ====
On 24 November 2017, Ertisbaev was transferred as the Kazakh ambassador to Belarus. During his tenure, he took part in the November 2018 meeting of the Council of Permanent Plenipotentiary Representatives of the Commonwealth of Independent States to the statutory and other bodies of the Commonwealth in the CIS Executive Committee in Minsk where he outlined that Kazakhstan stands for an open migration with a removal of trade barriers and bringing citizens together within the CIS. Ertisbaev continued working as an ambassador in Belarus before eventually being relieved on 12 August 2019 by President Kassym-Jomart Tokayev.

After returning to Kazakhstan from his diplomatic posts, Ertisbaev during his interview with Tengrinews, stated the decision in stepping down as a diplomat was primarily made on his own and that working without former president Nazarbayev would "not be easy" and instead "challenging in every way". Ertisbaev also revealed that he had initially planned to continue staying in his post until Belarusian President Alexander Lukashenko's planned visit to Kazakhstan in October 2019 and that he was thankful for Tokayev in "hastening" the return. During that time, Ertisbaev described himself in wanting to work as a "free expert" after reaching his retirement age and that his pension amounted to 178,000 tenge.

=== Chairman of the People's Party (2022–2026) ===
On 18 March 2022, it was revealed that Ertisbaev had joined the People's Party of Kazakhstan (QHP) in which party chairman Aiqyn Qongyrov assessed that Ertisbaev's position within the QHP would benefit the party and "whole Kazakhstan". Shortly beforehand, Ertisbaev had publicly criticised the QHP for "lacking activity" at a roundtable meeting.

At the 19th People's Party of Kazakhstan Extraordinary Congress held on 28 March 2022, Ertisbaev was elected as the QHP chairman.

Following several elections, on the extraordinary congress of the QHP of 27 June 2026, Ertisbaev resigned from the party chairmanship, and it was passed down to Nursultan Shokanov. Not long afterwards, the 2026 Kazakh legislative election took place, where the QHP received only 3.19% of the vote, losing its parliamentary representation. Ertisbaev announced his retirement from politics the day the preliminary election results were announced.

== Interviews ==
=== Associated Press: Borat ===
Reporters for Kazakhstanskaya Pravda interviewed Ertisbaev in November 2006, asking him how he felt about British comedian Sacha Baron Cohen's movie Borat: Cultural Learnings of America for Make Benefit Glorious Nation of Kazakhstan. Ertisbaev said that the film "above all mocks American manners and rural people and their intellect. Sasha Cohen's 'art' clearly isn't a masterpiece... But in reality there are truly funny parts. And people like to laugh." However, he criticized Cohen's sense of humor as "black, insulting, insolent, and openly stupid... Paradoxically, after the film's release, we have seen a more ardent and avid interest in Kazakhstan."

=== Interfax Agency: Nurzhan Subkhanberdin ===
When Interfax interviewed Ertisbaev in November 2004, he referred to Nurzhan Subkhanberdin, chairman of Kazkommertsbank bank, as a Kazakhstani "Khodorkovsky." Ertisbaev, speaking in favor of legislation that would limit the abilities of "various elite groups" to influence politics through lobbying, told Interfax that "in the transition period, in the post-Soviet area, any attempt from the oligarchs to influence... the president, the Parliament and the government can result in serious political cataclysms." Critics, such as reporters for Respublika, said the government's de-monopolization campaign would give Kazakhstanis a chance "to see how the government will put monopolists and their protectors from the head of state's inner circle in their place."

== Controversies ==
While serving as Nazarbayev's advisor, Ertisbaev espoused pro-government views in various interviews and statements, often ensuring critics that Nazarbayev's leadership led to a strong state that avoided revolutions, wars, upheavals. In 2009, during a roundtable on Radio Free Europe/Radio Liberty, Ertisbaev denied the existence of a cult of personality in Kazakhstan, claiming that "political pluralism, multi-party system, pluralism in the press, criticism of the head of state" was in place.

=== Assandi-Times ===
Unknown individuals distributed a fake edition of the Assandi-Times on 4 June 2004. The paper, which has become the most read paper in Kazakhstan for its criticism of corruption, instead criticized political rivals of President Nazarbayev in the fake edition. Galina Dyrdina, deputy editor of the Assandi-Times, said, "We confidently state that the publication of the fake Assandi-Times was sanctioned either by the president's administration or by structures close to it." Ertisbaev said Dyrdina's statements about government involvement "did not reflect reality."

=== Tulip Revolution ===
In March 2005, Ertisbaev warned of the possibility of a color revolution occurring in Kazakhstan as it did in Kyrgyzstan. He said that the weakness of Kyrgyz President Askar Akayev led to a "mass spontaneous riot". The political opposition in Kazakhstan will "have to wait for another 10 years" before they can take control of the government citing Nazarbayev's popularity and high chance of reelection due to the strength of the Kazakh economy. He called Kazakhstan a "very strong state" that if need be, will "quell a mob... with clubs and tear gas."

=== Response to Sarsenbaiuly's death ===
A court sentenced Erzhan Utembayev, the head of the Senate administration, to twenty years in prison for his involvement in the assassination of opposition politician Altynbek Sarsenbayev on 11 February 2006. Dariga Nazarbayeva, one of the most powerful Kazakh politicians and daughter of the President, responded to the conviction by calling on Nurtai Abykayev, the Speaker of the Senate, to resign. Global Insight, an international think tank, linked her criticism of Abykayev to her rivalry with Timur Kulibayev, the husband of her sister Dinara. Global Insight reports that the move "backfired" and President Nazarbayev had Ertisbaev take control of the Khabar Agency while coercing his daughter to merge the Asar party with the Otan party. Bagila Bukharbayeva of the Associated Press also drew this conclusion. Ertisbaev said the take over of Khabar would help Kazakhstan improve its "information security."
