= Gábor Hajdu =

Romanian politician (born 1976)

Gábor Hajdu (born November 2, 1976) is a Romanian politician who is a member of the Chamber of Deputies.
