= Ashat Raqymjanov =

Kazakh politician (born 1983)

MP Ashat Raqymjanov
- Асхат Рақымжанов
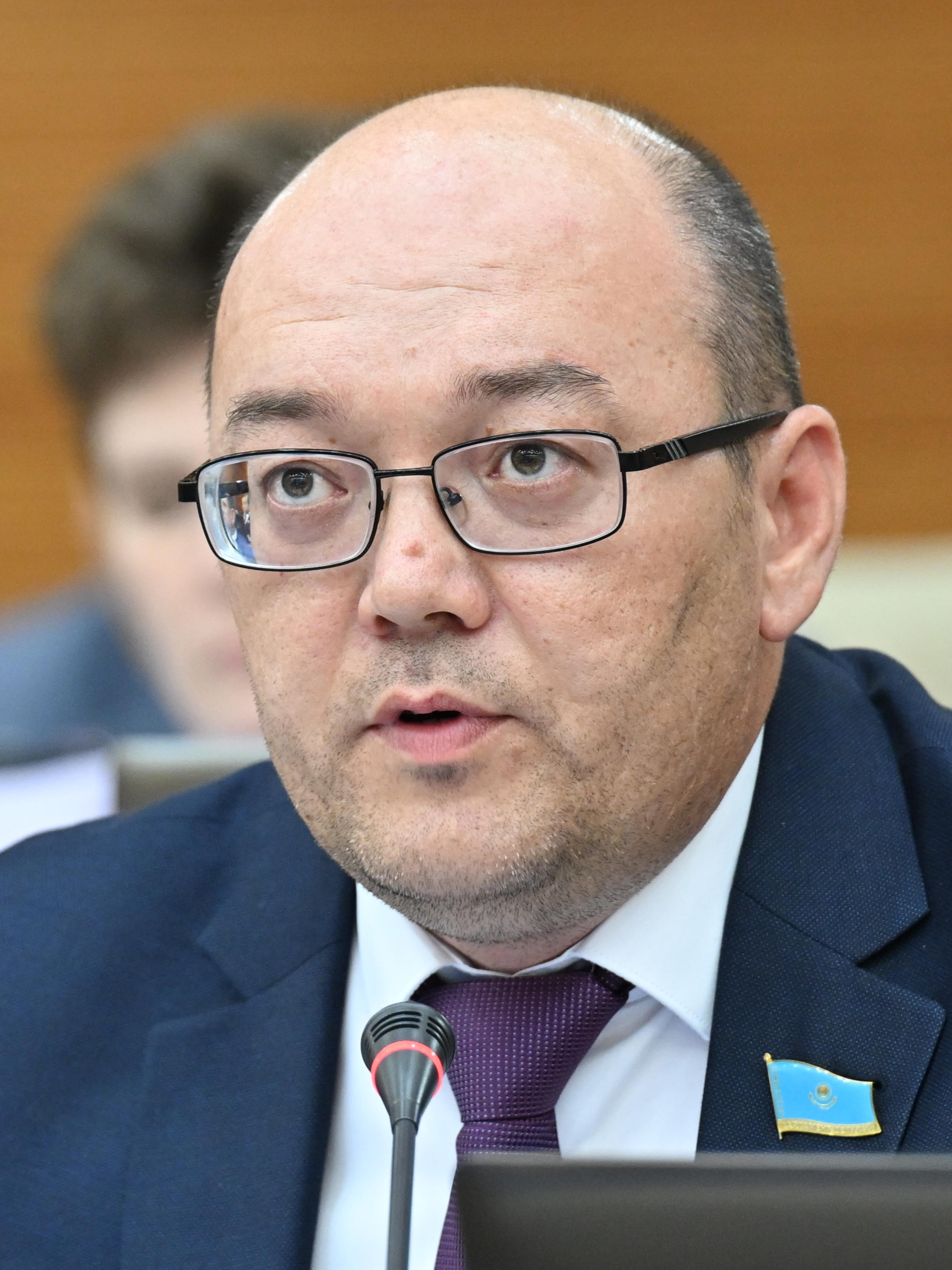
- Rahymjanov in 2023

Member of the Kurultai
- Incumbent
- Assumed office 27 August 2026
- Preceded by: Office established
- Constituency: JSDP Party list

Chairman of Nationwide Social Democratic Party
- Incumbent
- Assumed office 6 September 2019
- Preceded by: Ermurat Bapi

Member of the Mäjilis
- In office 28 March 2023 – 1 July 2026
- Succeeded by: Office abolished

Personal details
- Born: 10 June 1983 (age 43) Tselinograd, Tselinograd Oblast, Kazakh SSR, Soviet Union
- Party: JSDP
- Education: L.N. Gumilyov Eurasian National University

Ashat Nūrmağambetūly Raqymjanov (Note: Kazakh: Асхат Нұрмағамбетұлы Рақымжанов, IPA: [ɑsχɑ́t nʊ́rmɑʁɑmb̥ʲétʰʊɫə́ rɑχə̆mʒɑ́nəf]; Russian: Асхат Нурмагамбетович Рахимжанов, romanized: Askhat Nurmagambetovich Rakhimzhanov; English: /ˈæshæt ˌrækɪmˈʒɑːnɒf/ AS-hat RAK-im-ZHAHN-of) (born 10 June 1983) is a Kazakh politician who is serving as a member of the Kurultai from the Nationwide Social Democratic Party party list since August 2026 and Chairman of the party since September 2019. Prior to that, he was Chairman of the party's Astana City Branch. From 2023 to 2026, he served as Member of the Mäjilis.

== Biography ==
Rahymjanov was born in 1983 in Tselinograd, Kazakh SSR. In 2005, he graduated from the L.N. Gumilyov Eurasian National University in Astana with a degree in political science. Rahymjanov was the deputy chairman of the Astana City Branch of the Nationwide Social Democratic Party (JSDP) where he eventually became the chairman of the branch.

On 6 September 2019, at the 15th Extraordinary Congress of the JSDP, Rahymjanov was elected as the chairman of the party by its delegates, assuming his predecessor Ermurat Bapi's role to which later he criticized the move as being "illegal".
