= List of members of the 1st Kurultai =

The 1st Kurultai began its term on 27 August 2026. 145 members were elected during the 2026 Kazakh legislative election.

== List ==
No.	Name	Party (2026)	Tenure	Sources
1	Konstantin Avershin	Ädilet	2022–2026; 2026–	
2	Erbol Adaev	Ädilet	2026–	
3	Tilektes Adambekov	Ädilet	2021–2026; 2026–	
4	Ashat Aimagambetov	Ädilet	2023–2026; 2026–	
5	Aijan Aimaganova	Ädilet	2026–	
6	Abai Altai	Ädilet	2026–	
7	Gülzira Atabaeva	Ädilet	2026–	
8	Gülnaz Atamqulova	Ädilet	2026–	
9	Darhan Ahmediev	Ädilet	2026–	
10	Kendebai Adambek	Ädilet	2026–	
11	Jarqynbek Amantaiuly	Ädilet	2026–	
12	Almat Äbdikeşov	Ädilet	2026–	
13	Madiar Ämirğaliev	Ädilet	2026–	
14	Bekjan Älimqulov	Ädilet	2026–	
15	Aiaujan Äşimova	Ädilet	2026–	
16	Janarbek Äşimjanova	Ädilet	2023–2026; 2026–	
17	Äsel Badenova	Ädilet	2026–	
18	Zülfia Baisaqova	Ädilet	2026–	
19	Vadim Bassin	Ädilet	2026–	
20	Erlan Batybekov	Ädilet	2026–	
21	Marat Başimov	Ädilet	2023–2026; 2026–	
22	Nurlan Beknazarov	Ädilet	2023–2026; 2026–	
23	Berik Berkimbaev	Ädilet	2026–	
24	Yevgeny Bolgert	Ädilet	2023–2026; 2026–	
25	Satybaldy Burşaqov	Ädilet	2026–	
26	Şalqar Baibekov	Ädilet	2026–	
27	Airat Bazenov	Ädilet	2026–	
28	Ainagül Baltaşeva	Ädilet	2026–	
29	Nurken Baqytbekuly	Ädilet	2026–	
30	Eldos Baialyşbaev	Ädilet	2026–	
31	Natalia Godunova	Ädilet	2026–	
32	Aibek Dädebai	Ädilet	2026–	
33	Alexander Danilov	Ädilet	2026–	
34	Erbol Danagulov	Ädilet	2026–	
35	Juldyz Danbaeva	Ädilet	2026–	
36	Didarbek Dildabek	Ädilet	2026–	
37	Nurlan Dulatbekov	Ädilet	2026–	
38	Begaly Eraliev	Ädilet	2026–	
39	Şynasyl Ernazar	Ädilet	2026–	
40	Sungat Esimhanov	Ädilet	2026–	
41	Aqerke Eskendirova	Ädilet	2026–	
42	Bota Eleusizova	Ädilet	2026–	
43	Magjan Eraliev	Ädilet	2026–	
44	Nursadyq Ergeşbek	Ädilet	2026–	
45	Arman Jansengirov	Ädilet	2026–	
46	Qarlygaş Jamanqulova	Ädilet	2026–	
47	Bauyrjan Jamalov	Ädilet	2026–	
48	Almat Jükebaev	Ädilet	2026–	
49	Lazzat Jylqybaeva	Ädilet	2026–	
50	Dinara Zakieva	Ädilet	2021–2023; 2026–	
51	Snezhanna Imasheva	Ädilet	2016–2026; 2026–	
52	Laura Qarabasova	Ädilet	2026–	
53	Şolpan Qarinova	Ädilet	2026–	
54	Assel Khairova	Ädilet	2026–	
55	Serik Qojaniazov	Ädilet	2026–	
56	Meirambai Kemalov	Ädilet	2026–	
57	Daulet Karibek	Ädilet	2026–	
58	Marat Qojaev	Ädilet	2026–	
59	Lazzat Qojahmetova	Ädilet	2026–	
60	Zamira Kuzieva	Ädilet	2026–	
61	Yulia Kuchinskaya	Ädilet	2026–	
62	Dihan Qamzabekuly	Ädilet	2026–	
63	Ämirbek Ospanbekov	Ädilet	2026–	
64	Şota Ospanov	Ädilet	2026–	
65	Abbat Orisbaev	Ädilet	2026–	
66	Olga Perepechina	Ädilet	2014–2026; 2026–	
67	Konstantin Petrov	Ädilet	2026–	
68	Sergey Ponomaryov	Ädilet	2026–	
69	Sherzod Pulatov	Ädilet	2026–	
70	Natalya Ramazanova	Ädilet	2026–	
71	Maxim Rozhin	Ädilet	2023–2026; 2026–	
72	Madi Rymjanov	Ädilet	2026–	
73	Tatyana Savelyeva	Ädilet	2023–2026; 2026–	
74	Erlan Sairov	Ädilet	2021–2026; 2026–	
75	Aidos Sarym	Ädilet	2021–2026; 2026–	
76	Yekaterina Smyshlyayeva	Ädilet	2021–2026; 2026–	
77	Aiat Sügirbai	Ädilet	2026–	
78	Rusana Sulaimonova	Ädilet	2026–	
79	Aisulu Süleimenova	Ädilet	2026–	
80	Zamir Sagynov	Ädilet	2026–	
81	Marat Sebasov	Ädilet	2026–	
82	Yelena Semidotskikh	Ädilet	2026–	
83	Aijan Temerbaeva	Ädilet	2026–	
84	Irina Ten	Ädilet	2026–	
85	Armangül Toqtamurat	Ädilet	2026–	
86	Tättigül Talaeva	Ädilet	2026–	
87	Nurbakhyt Tengizbayev	Ädilet	2026–	
88	Abilqaiyr Tamabek	Ädilet	2026–	
89	Turarbek Tilemisov	Ädilet	2026–	
90	Ilya Terenchenko	Ädilet	2026–	
91	Erlan Toqşylyq	Ädilet	2026–	
92	Nurlan Tolybaev	Ädilet	2026–	
93	Ünzila Şapaq	Ädilet	2023–2026; 2026–	
94	Nikita Shatalov	Ädilet	2023–2026; 2026–	
95	Marat Şibutov	Ädilet	2026–	
96	Stanislav Shcherbakov	Ädilet	2026–	
97	Dauren Maralov	Ädilet	2026–	
98	Erqanat Musylmanbek	Ädilet	2026–	
99	Muratbek Muhamedberdiev	Ädilet	2026–	
100	Dana Medeuova	Ädilet	2026–	
101	Gulishan Nahbaeva	Ädilet	2026–	
102	Bahadyr Narymbetov	Ädilet	2026–	
103	Aijan Naiymbekova	Ädilet	2026–	
104	Borihan Nurmuhamedov	Ädilet	2026–	
105	Nurjan Niazaliev	Ädilet	2026–	
106	Erbol Nurgaliev	Ädilet	2026–	
107	Arman Qalyqov	Ädilet	2023–2026; 2026–	
108	Arman Khairullin	Ädilet	2026–	
109	Musa Khairulliev	Ädilet	2026–	
110	Aijan Ysqaqova	Ädilet	2021–2026; 2026–	
1	Qairat Aituğanov	Auyl	2026–	
2	Şahmardan Baimanov	Auyl	2026–	
3	Zahira Begalieva	Auyl	2026–	
4	Serik Egizbaev	Auyl	2023–2026; 2026–	
5	Murat Irgibaev	Auyl	2026–	
6	Ajar Qadjybekova	Auyl	2026–	
7	Vladimri Kiyan	Auyl	2026–	
8	Almas Muhametov	Auyl	2026–	
9	Dinara Raihanova	Auyl	2026–	
10	Rabiga Toqseitova	Auyl	2026–	
1	Bekjan Aitqulov	Respublica	2026–	
2	Ruslan Idrisov	Respublica	2026–	
3	Meiirhat Qasymbaev	Respublica	2026–	
4	Oljas Quspekov	Respublica	2023–2026; 2026–	
5	Dinara Naumova	Respublica	2023–2026; 2026–	
6	Yekaterina Smolyakova	Respublica	2025–2026; 2026–	
7	Nurgül Tau	Respublica	2023–2026; 2026–	
8	Mahambet Khasenov	Respublica	2026–	
9	Aidarbek Qojanazarov	Respublica	2023–2026; 2026–	
1	Dauren Ahmetjaev	Aq Jol	2026–	
2	Baqtybek Bibaev	Aq Jol	2026–	
3	Dania Espaeva	Aq Jol	2016–2026; 2026–	
4	Asylhan Qojahmetov	Aq Jol	2026–	
5	Yury Lee	Aq Jol	2026–	
6	Oljas Nuraldinov	Aq Jol	2025–2026; 2026–	
7	Meiram Şynasilova	Aq Jol	2026–	
8	Ermekqali Yusupov	Aq Jol	2026–	
1	Ashat Raqymjanov	NSDP	2023–2026; 2026–	
2	Maqsut Nasibulov	NSDP	2026–	
3	Nurainaş Kamalova	NSDP	2026–	
4	Larisa Lee	NSDP	2026–	
5	Aslan Kulmagambetov	NSDP	2026–	
6	Arman Aqylbai	NSDP	2026–	
7	Nauryz Sailaubai	NSDP	2023–2026; 2026–	
8	Ajar Sagandyqova	NSDP	2023–2026; 2026–	
