= Ünzila Şapaq =

Kazakh politician (born 1973)

MP Ünzila Şapaq
- Үнзила Шапақ
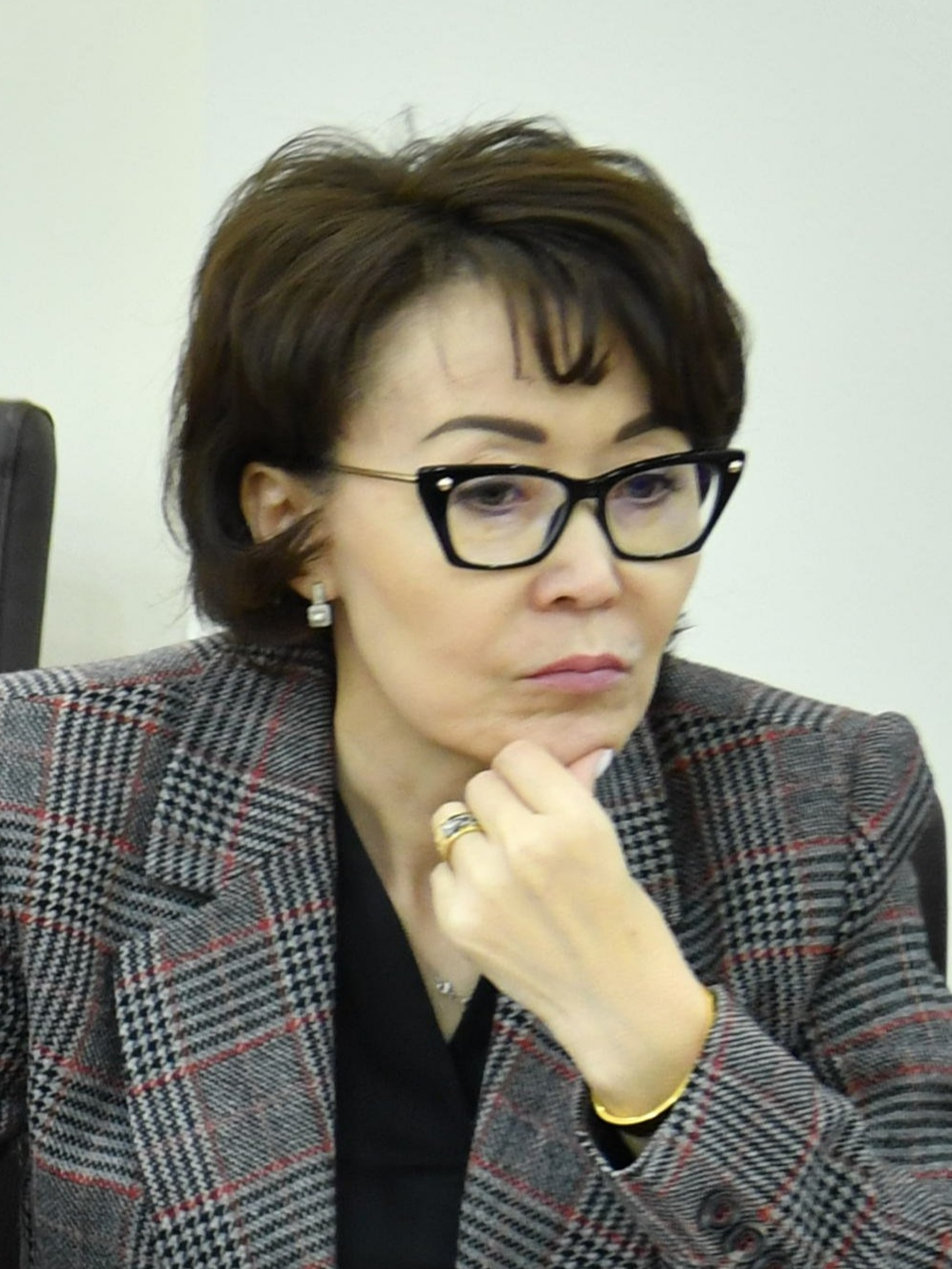
- Şapaq in 2023

Member of the 1st Kurultai
- Incumbent
- Assumed office 27 August 2026
- Constituency: Ädilet party list

Member of the 7th and 8th Mäjilis
- In office 28 March 2023 – 1 July 2026
- Constituency: Amanat party list

Personal details
- Born: 30 April 1973 (age 53) Ulaanbaatar, Mongolia
- Party: Ädilet (since 2026)
- Other political affiliations: Amanat (2023–2026)
- Education: Karagandy State University; Kazakh Humanitarian Juridical University; Karaganda Economic University of Kazpotrebsoyuz
- Awards: Order of Parasat; Order of Kurmet; Medal for Distinguished Labor
- Website: Official profile on Kurultai website

Ünzila Şapaq (Note: Kazakh: Үнзила Шапақ) (Note: Often transliterated as Unzila Shapak through a Russified Romanization of Унзила Шапак.) (born 30 April 1973) is a Kazakh academic, historian, lawyer and politician serving as the member of the 1st Kurultai since 2026. Previously, she was a member of the 8th Mäjilis from 2023 to 2026. She is a co-author of the Constitution of Kazakhstan.

== Early life, education and early career ==
Ünzila Şapaq was born on 30 April 1973 in Ulaanbaatar, Mongolia. Her father worked as a miner and died early, while her mother worked as a miner until retirement.

In 1996, after graduating with a law degree from Karagandy State University, she spent two years teaching at the Department of Fundamentals of Law, Theory and History of State and Law of the Faculty of Law. In 1998, she completed her postgraduate studies at the same university.

In 2001, Şapaq defended her Candidate of Sciences dissertation titled "The Mongol-Oirat Law of 1640" (Kazakh: 1640 жылғы Монгол-Ойрат заңы), earned the degree of Candidate of Juridical Sciences, and continued teaching as a senior lecturer in the same department at the Karagandy State University.

From 2004 to 2016, she held various positions at the Kazakh Humanitarian Juridical University. Şapaq served as an associate professor at the Department of Theory and History of State and Law from 2004 to 2009, and concurrently worked as an expert at the Institute of Scientific Analysis and Expertise from 2004 to 2014. From 2009 to 2011, she headed the Department of Theory and History of State and Law of Foreign Countries, before serving as vice-rector and director of the Higher School of National Law from 2011 to 2012. Subsequently, she was a professor at the Department of State and Legal Disciplines from 2012 to 2016, and also served as director of the Higher School of Law from 2014 to 2016.

In 2006, she was awarded the academic title of docent. Alongside her work, from 2007 to 2010, Şapaq pursued doctoral studies at the Department of Theory and History of State and Law at the Kazakh Humanitarian Juridical University. In 2010, she completed her doctorate and earned the degree of Doctor of Juridical Sciences after defending her dissertation titled "Political Structure and Legal System of the Kalmyk Khanate (1664–1771)"(Kazakh: Қалмақ хандығының саяси құрылымы және құқықтық жүйесі (1664—1771 жж.)).

Concurrently, from 2010 to 2015, Şapaq worked as a chief researcher at the Center for Linguistic Expertise under the Ministry of Justice. In 2012, she graduated from the Karaganda Economic University of Kazpotrebsoyuz with a degree in economics.

== Political career ==
On 4 March 2016, with the approval of the Senate under Kassym-Jomart Tokayev, Şapaq was appointed a member of the Constitutional Council. She was reappointed on 12 March 2020. In September 2022, as a member of the Constitutional Council, she supported Kassym-Jomart Tokayev's constitutional amendments establishing a single seven-year presidential term and renaming the capital back to Astana. On 1 January 2023, the Constitutional Council ceased to exist.

On 28 March 2016, president Nursultan Nazarbayev appointed Şapaq as a substitute member of the Venice Commission representing Kazakhstan. On 31 March 2020, Tokayev reappointed her, and on 7 March 2024, removed her from the commission.

Following the 2023 legislative election, on 28 March 2023, Şapaq was registered as a member of the 8th Mäjilis from the Amanat party list.

After Kassym-Jomart Tokayev proposed abolishing the Senate and transitioning to a unicameral parliament on 8 October 2025, he appointed Şapaq to the working group on parliamentary reform. Following Tokayev's subsequent statement in January 2026, that the transition to a unicameral system would require an entirely new Constitution, Şapaq joined the Commission on Constitutional Reform. This process culminated in the adoption of a new Constitution of Kazakhstan which replaced the existing bicameral parliament with a unicameral Kurultai.

On 8 May 2026, by Tokayev's decree, she was appointed to the Commission on Human Rights under the President of Kazakhstan.

In June 2026, Amanat merged into the newly formed Ädilet, in which Şapaq retained his membership.

On 1 July 2026, the mandates of all members of parliament were terminated following the implementation of a new Constitution of Kazakhstan. On 21 July Şapaq was registered as a candidate for the Kurultai. In the legislative elections held on 23 August 2026, the Ädilet party won the majority of votes. On 27 August, the Central Election Commission registered Şapaq as a member of the 1st Kurultai. The following day, at the first session of the Kurultai, she was elected chair of the Committee on Constitutional Legislation, Judicial System and Law Enforcement Agencies.

== Personal life ==
Şapaq has 2 children and speaks Russian in addition to his native Kazakh.

== Awards and honours ==
- Order of Parasat (2025)
- Order of Kurmet (2022)
- Medal “30 Years of the Judicial System of Kazakhstan" (2022)
- Medal "30 Years of the Independence of Kazakhstan" (2021)
- Medal "100 Years of the Ministry of Finance of Kazakhstan" (2021)
- Medal "Honorary Lawyer of Kazakhstan" (2021)
- Medal "25 Years of the Constitution of the Republic of Kazakhstan" (2020)
- Medal "25 Years of the Assembly of People of Kazakhstan" (2020)
- Medal "20 Years of Astana" (2018)
- Medal "25 Years of the Police of Kazakhstan" (2017)
- Medal "25 Years of the Independence of the Republic of Kazakhstan" (2016)
- Medal "20 Years of the Constitution of the Republic of Kazakhstan" (2015)
- Certificate of Honor from the Äkim of Astana (2010)
- Best docent of the year (2010)
- Certificates of Honor from the Minister of Education and Science of Kazakhstan (2009, 2001)
- Certificates of Honor from the Akims of Karaganda and Astana (2002)
- Medal for Distinguished Labor
- Medal "15 Years of KazGUU"
