= Konstantin Avershin =

Kazakh politician (born 1976)

MP Konstantin Avershin
- Константин Авершин
- Official portrait

Member of the 1st Kurultai
- Incumbent
- Assumed office 27 August 2026
- Constituency: Ädilet party list

Member of the 7th and 8th Mäjilis
- In office 29 March 2022 – 1 July 2026
- Constituency: Nur Otan party list (2022–2023); Amanat party list (2023–2026)

Member of the 6th and 7th Almaty City Mäslihat
- In office 23 March 2016 – 28 March 2022
- Constituency: No. 22 (2016–2021); Nur Otan party list (2021–2022)

Personal details
- Born: 7 October 1976 (age 50) Taldykorgan, Kazakh SSR, Soviet Union
- Party: Ädilet (since 2026)
- Other political affiliations: Amanat (formerly Nur Otan)
- Spouse: Roza Avershina
- Children: 2
- Education: Bellerbys College; Anglia Ruskin University; Russian Presidential Academy of National Economy and Public Administration (MBA)
- Awards: Order of Parasat; Order of Kurmet; People's Gratitude medal
- Website: Official profile on Kurultai website

Military service
- Allegiance: Kazakhstan
- Service: National Security Committee of Kazakhstan
- Service years: 2001–2009
- Rank: Captain

Konstantin Viktorovich Avershin (Note: Kazakh: Константин Викторович Авершин, Russian: Константин Викторович Авершин) (born 7 October 1976) is a Kazakh politician, public figure and entrepreneur serving as the member of the 1st Kurultai since 2026. Previously, he was a member of the Mäjilis from 2022 to 2026 and member of the Almaty City Mäslihat from 2016 to 2022.

== Biography ==
Konstantin Viktorovich Avershin was born on 7 October 1976 in Taldykorgan, Soviet Kazakhstan.

His father, Viktor Grigoryevich Avershin (7 October 1951 – 10 November 2023), served in the KGB of Soviet Kazakhstan and the National Security Committee (NSC) of Kazakhstan from 1973 to 2010. He was of Russian ethnicity. In the 1990s, he served as deputy head of the Counter-Terrorism Department of the KGB of Soviet Kazakhstan, and from 2000 to 2010, he headed the southern regional office of the NSC Central Apparatus. In July 2000, he led a special operation to recover an Antonov An-12 military aircraft stolen from Baikonur from Africa, for which he was awarded the Order of Valor, 2nd Class.

His mother, Raziya Abdrakhmanovna Avershina (born 1950), is of Kazakh ethnicity. He has a brother, Timur Avershin (born 1981).

In 1993, Konstantin Avershin graduated from Humanitarian and Linguistic Gymnasium No. 25 in Almaty. He then moved to the United Kingdom, graduating from Bellerbys College in 1995 and Anglia Ruskin University in 1998 with degrees in business and economics under the Bolashak scholarship program.

After returning to Kazakhstan in 1998, Avershin worked for one year as a specialist in the commercial department at KEGOC. From 1999 to 2001, he served as chief manager of the commercial department at Kedentransservice CJSC. From 2001 to 2009, he served in the NSC (Military Unit No. 62156), attaining the rank of captain.

From 2009 to 2011, he worked as a regional representative for Europe Aviation.

In 2013, Avershin founded Red Dragon Almaty LLP to launch the Kazakhstani brand and restaurant chain Red Dragon in Almaty. That same year, he was elected vice president of the Association of Restaurants of Kazakhstan and became the Almaty regional representative for the newly established Atameken National Chamber of Entrepreneurs. In 2015, he founded the "I am Almatian" (Note: Kazakh: Мен Алматылықпын, Russian: Я Алматинец)public movement.

On 23 March 2016, Avershin was registered as a member of the 6th Almaty City Mäslihat from Constituency No. 22, and on 25 March, he was elected chairman of the commission on entrepreneurship development and housing and communal services. On 14 January 2021, he was re-elected to the 7th Mäslihat representing the Nur Otan party.

In 2018, he earned a MBA from the Russian Presidential Academy of National Economy and Public Administration.

On 28 March 2022, his Mäslihat mandate was terminated, and on 29 March, Avershin was registered as a member of the 7th Mäjilis. Following his appointment to Mäjilis, he stepped down from Red Dragon Almaty LLP, the Association of Restaurants of Kazakhstan, and the "I am Almatian" public association. He was re-elected to the 8th Mäjilis in 2023 representing Amanat (formerly Nur Otan).

In June 2026, Amanat merged into the newly formed Ädilet, in which Avershin retained his membership.

On 1 July 2026, the mandates of all members of parliament were terminated following the implementation of a new Constitution of Kazakhstan. On 21 July, Avershin was registered as a candidate for the Kurultai. In the legislative elections held on 23 August 2026, the Ädilet won the majority of votes. On 27 August, the Central Election Commission registered Avershin as a member of the 1st Kurultai. The following day, at the first session of the Kurultai, he was elected Deputy Chair of the Committee on International Affairs, Defense and Security of Marat Qojaev.

== Personal life ==
Avershin is married to Roza Almahanqyzy Avershina (born 1981) and had two daughters, Sabina (born 2009) and Dominika (born 2012).

== Awards and honours ==
- Order of Parasat (2026)
- Medal of the Prosecutor General's Office of Kazakhstan "For Contribution to the Development of International Cooperation" (2025)
- Certificate of Honor from the CSTO Parliamentary Assembly (2025)
- Medal "30 Years of the Assembly of People of Kazakhstan" (2025)
- Jubilee Medal "30 Years of the Mäslihats of Kazakhstan" (2025)
- People's Gratitude medal (2020)
- Order of Kurmet (2017)
- Order "Pride of the Economy" (2016)
- Letter of Appreciation and wristwatch from the Almaty Region Department of Internal Affairs "For contribution and assistance in ensuring public order and solving grave crimes" (2015)
- Medal "For Service in Special Forces" (2014)
- Breast badge "NSC – Kazakhstan" (2007)
