= Satybaldy Burşaqov =

Kazakh diplomat and politician (born 1968)

MP Satybaldy Burşaqov
- Сатыбалды Бұршақов

Member of the Kurultai
- Incumbent
- Assumed office 27 August 2026
- Party list: Ädilet

Kazakh ambassador to North Macedonia
- In office 26 March 2024 – 27 August 2026
- President: Kassym-Jomart Tokayev
- Succeeded by: TBD

Kazakh ambassador to Cyprus
- In office 12 October 2020 – 26 March 2024
- President: Kassym-Jomart Tokayev
- Preceded by: Jänibek Äbdiraşov
- Succeeded by: Nikolay Jumaqanov

Kazakh ambassador to Israel
- In office 30 September 2019 – 26 March 2024
- President: Kassym-Jomart Tokayev
- Preceded by: Dulat Quanyşev
- Succeeded by: Daulet Emberdiev

Personal details
- Born: 24 August 1968 (age 58) Pervomaysk, Chapaevsk, West Kazakhstan Region, Kazakh SSR, Soviet Union
- Party: Ädilet (since 2026)
- Children: 2
- Education: Almaty Pedagogical Institute of Foreign Languages; Foreign Service Academy; Netherlands Institute of International Relations Clingendael
- Awards: Order of Kurmet; People's Gratitude medal

Military service
- Service: Soviet Army
- Service years: 1986–1988

Satybaldy Eresūly Burşaqov (Note: Often transliterated as Satybaldy Eresovich Burshakov through a Russified Romanization of Сатыбалды Ересович Буршаков.) (Note: Kazakh: Сатыбалды Ересұлы Бұршақов) (born 24 August 1968) is a Kazakh diplomat and politician serving as the member of the 1st Kurultai since 2026. Previously, he was the Kazakh ambassador to North Macedonia, Cyprus and Israel.

== Early life and education ==
Satybaldy Eresuly Burşaqov was born on 24 August 1968 in Pervomaysk, a village in Chapaevsky District (now Akzhaik District), West Kazakhstan Region, Soviet Kazakhstan.

In 1993, after graduating from the Almaty Pedagogical Institute of Foreign Languages with a degree in English and Russian education, he remained at the institute as a lecturer. That same year, he joined the Ministry of Foreign Affairs of Kazakhstan (MFA) as a desk officer, later becoming an attaché of the European Department under the leadership of Minister Kassym-Jomart Tokayev. Concurrently, in 1994, he completed courses at the Foreign Service Academy in Islamabad, Pakistan.

In 1995, following his graduation from the Netherlands Institute of International Relations Clingendael, Burşaqov was appointed to the Embassy of Kazakhstan in Hungary, where he served as an attaché, and was subsequently promoted to third and then second secretary. In 2000, upon returning to Kazakhstan, he worked in the Department of Europe and America of the MFA as a first secretary, counselor of the Department of Bilateral Cooperation, and head of division.

In 2002, Burşaqov was posted to Belgium, serving as a first secretary and later as a counselor at the Embassy of Kazakhstan.

In 2007, following Tokayev's election as chairman of the Senate, Burşaqov returned to Kazakhstan. Until Tokayev's resignation in 2011, he served within the Senate Office as deputy head and subsequently head of the Inter-Parliamentary Relations and International Cooperation Department.

== Political career ==
From 2011 to 2012, Burşaqov headed the International Relations and Protocol Department of the Majilis Office. Between 2012 and 2017, he served as Deputy Permanent Representative of Kazakhstan to UNESCO, and from 2017 to 2019, he was deputy chairman of the International Information Committee of the MFA.

Following the resignation of president Nursultan Nazarbayev and Tokayev's assumption of the presidency in 2019, on 29 March, Burşaqov was appointed head of the Foreign Policy Center of the Presidential Administration. Four months later, on 22 July, he took charge of the Foreign Policy and International Relations Department of the Presidential Administration.

After serving in the administration for six months, Tokayev appointed Burşaqov as ambassador to Israel on 30 September 2019.

On 12 October 2020, he was concurrently appointed ambassador to Cyprus.

On 26 March 2024, Tokayev relieved Burşaqov of these posts and appointed him ambassador to North Macedonia.

On 1 July 2026, a new Constitution of Kazakhstan entered into force, replacing the bicameral parliament with a unicameral Kurultai. On 21 July Burşaqov was registered as a candidate for the Kurultai. In the legislative elections held on 23 August 2026, the Ädilet party, under which Satybaldy Burşaqov ran, won the majority of votes. On 27 August the Central Election Commission confirmed Burşaqov's election as a member of the 1st Kurultai, following which he was formally relieved of his duties as ambassador to North Macedonia. The following day, during the inaugural session of the Kurultai, he joined the Committee on International Affairs, Defense and Security.

== Personal life ==
Burşaqov is married and has two children. Also he speaks Russian, English and French in addition to his native Kazakh.

== Awards and ranks ==
- Presidential Certificate of Gratitude (2010, 2024)
- Order of the Patriarch of Jerusalem (2024)
- Medal "30 Years of CICA" (2022)
- Order of Kurmet (2021)
- Diplomat of the Year Award in Cyprus (2021)
- People's Gratitude medal (2020)
- Honorary Certificate of Kazakhstan (2008)
