= Aijan Aimaganova =

Kazakh jurist (born 1987)

MP Aijan Aimağanova
- Айжан Аймағанова

Member of the Kurultai
- Incumbent
- Assumed office 27 August 2026
- Party list: Ädilet

Personal details
- Born: 6 March 1987 (age 39) Petropavl, Kazakh SSR, Soviet Union
- Party: Ädilet
- Education: North Kazakhstan State University; Kazakhstan-Russian University
- Awards: Medal for Distinguished Labor

Military service
- Rank: Lieutenant Colonel of Justice

Aijan Talğatqyzy Aimağanova (Note: Often transliterated as Aizhan Talgatovna Aimaganova through a Russified Romanization of Айжан Талгатовна Аймаганова.) (Note: Kazakh: Айжан Талғатқызы Аймағанова) (born 6 March 1987) is a Kazakh jurist serving as the member of the 1st Kurultai since 2026.

== Early life and education ==
Aijan Talgatqyzy Aimaganova was born on 6 March 1987 in Petropavl.

In 2007, she graduated from the law faculty of North Kazakhstan State University, and in 2009, from the Kazakhstan-Russian University. Concurrently, from 2007 to 2008, she taught at the Department of Computer Science and Computing Technology.

== Later career ==
Aimaganova began her career in 2008 at the Petropavl City Court, serving as a chief specialist and court session secretary. In 2010, she transferred to the same position at the Specialized Interdistrict Criminal Court of the North Kazakhstan Region.

In 2013, she became an assistant prosecutor of Petropavl. In 2017, she was appointed prosecutor of the Department for Supervision of the Legality of Judicial Acts and Representation of State Interests in Criminal Cases at the Petropavl City Prosecutor's Office. Later that year, Aimaganova was appointed prosecutor of the Criminal Prosecution Department at the Saryarqa District Prosecutor's Office in Astana. In 2018, she was promoted to senior prosecutor of the Public Prosecutors Department. From 2018 to 2023, Aimaganova headed the Public Prosecution Support Department of the Baiqonyr District Prosecutor's Office. In 2023, she participated in the high-profile trial of businessman Qairat Boranbaev.

== Prosecution service ==
In 2024, Aimaganova was appointed Senior Assistant to the prosecutor of Astana. She gained widespread public recognition in the spring of the same year while serving as the state prosecutor in the high-profile murder trial of former minister of national economy Quandyq Bishimbaev. On social media, she was widely praised as the embodiment of a strong, incorruptible, modern public servant confidently standing up to powerful figures in court; users frequently compared her to Katniss Everdeen, the protagonist of The Hunger Games.

Following the conclusion of the trial, in July 2024, Aimaganova was promoted to the rank of Lieutenant Colonel of Justice and appointed Head of the Department for Supporting Public Prosecution and Participation in Appellate Proceedings at the Astana Prosecutor's Office. In July 2026, she announced her resignation from the prosecutor's office to run as a candidate for the newly established Kurultai the Ädilet party.

== Political career ==
In the Kurultai elections held on 23 August 2026, the Ädilet secured a majority of votes. On 27 August, the Central Election Commission registered Aijan Aimaganova as a member of the 1st Kurultai.

== Awards and ranks ==
- Medal for Distinguished Labor

=== Ranks ===
- Lieutenant Colonel of Justice (2024)
- Major of Justice (until 2024)

== Personal life ==
Aijan Aimaganova has no publicly available information about his personal life.
