= Almat Abdikeshov =

Kazakh engineer and politician (born 1984)

MP Almat Äbdıkeşov
- Алмат Әбдікешов

Member of the Kurultai
- Incumbent
- Assumed office 27 August 2026
- Party list: Ädilet

Personal details
- Born: 5 November 1984 (age 41) Jezkazgan, Kazakh SSR, Soviet Union
- Party: Ädilet (since 2026)
- Education: Jezkazgan University; Eurasian Humanities Institute
- Awards: Medal for Distinguished Labor
- Website: Official profile on Kurultai website

Almat Janbolatūly Äbdıkeşov (Note: Often transliterated as Almat Zhanbolatovich Abdikeshov through a Russified Romanization of Алмат Жанболатович Абдикешов.) (Note: Kazakh: Алмат Жанболатұлы Әбдікешов) (born 5 November 1984) is a Kazakh engineer and politician who has served as a member of the 1st Kurultai since 2026.

== Early life and education ==
Almat Janbolatūly Äbdıkeşov was born on 5 November 1984 in Jezkazgan.

In 2006 Äbdıkeşov graduated from the Jezkazgan University with a degree in mining engineering and earned a degree in economics from the Eurasian Humanities Institute in 2008.

Äbdıkeşov began his career in 2004 at the age of 20, working as a first- and second-grade underground apprentice miner at the Zhezkazgan Mining and Metallurgical Complex.

In 2007, he relocated to Astana for professional reasons and joined the Ministry of Industry and Trade. There, he advanced from leading specialist in the Department of Science and Technology Regulation to expert roles within the Ministry's Secretariat and various directorates, including technical policy and mobilization training, corporate governance, construction and housing development, budget planning, and internal administration.

In 2010, he was appointed Chief Expert of the Ministry's Secretariat and the Organizational and Control Directorate under the Department of Strategic Planning. In 2012, he headed the Directorates for Institutional Relations and State Legal Entities.

== Political career ==
In October 2012, Äbdıkeşov became an advisor to Minister Erbolat Dosaev at the Ministry of Economy and Budget Planning. After four months in this role, he was appointed Head of the Department of Internal Administration in February 2013, and subsequently transitioned to Head of the Department of Human Resources in April 2016.

On 5 March 2018, he was appointed Deputy Chairman of the Committee for Geology and Subsoil Use under the Ministry for Investment and Development.

On 6 April 2022, PM Älihan Smaiylov appointed Äbdıkeşov as Chief of Staff of the Ministry of Ecology, Geology and Natural Resources. He left his post in February 2023 following the Ministry's reorganization.

In September 2023, Äbdıkeşov joined Kazakhmys Barlau LLP, a private firm located in his hometown. He initially served as an administrator before being promoted to Technical Director in 2025.

Following the legislative elections on 23 August 2026, the Adilet party, of which Äbdıkeşov is a member, secured the majority of votes in the newly formed unicameral parliament, the Kurultai. On 27 August, the Central Election Commission registered Almat Äbdıkeşov as a member of the 1st Kurultai. The following day, during the inaugural session of the Kurultai, he joined the Committee on Economic Policy, Industry and Energy.

== Personal life ==
Äbdıkeşov has no publicly available information about his personal life.

== Awards ==
- Medal for Distinguished Labor (2020)
