= Bekjan Älimqulov =

Kazakh politician (born 1989)

MP Bekjan Älimqulov
- Бекжан Әлімқұлов

Member of the Kurultai
- Incumbent
- Assumed office 27 August 2026
- Party list: Ädilet

Personal details
- Born: 28 November 1989 (age 36) Shymkent, Kazakh SSR, Soviet Union
- Party: Ädilet (since 2026)
- Other political affiliations: Nur Otan
- Education: Suleyman Demirel University (BIS); Eurasian National University (M.L.); Columbia University School of International and Public Affairs (MPA)

Bekjan Muhidinūly Älimqulov (Note: Often transliterated as Bekzhan Mukhidinuly Alimkulov through a Russified Romanization of Бекжан Мухидинулы Алимкулов.) (Note: Kazakh: Бекжан Мухидинұлы Әлімқұлов) (born 28 November 1989) is a Kazakh politician serving as the member of the 1st Kurultai since 2026.

== Early life and education ==
Bekjan Muhidinūly Älimqulov was born on 28 November 1989 in Shymkent, Soviet Kazakhstan.

He graduated from the Suleyman Demirel University in 2011 with a BIS. Älimqulov studied at the Eurasian National University received a M.L. in 2012 and earned a MPA from the Columbia University School of International and Public Affairs in 2023.

Älimqulov was a member of the Presidential Youth Personnel Reserve. He was also a member of the Entrepreneurship Support Council for the Nur Otan party branch and its youth wing Jas Otan.

== Career ==
He began his career in 2010 while still studying, working as an operator in the business department at Bastau, a subsidiary of the Almaty Su city water utility company. In 2011, he worked as a chief procurement specialist at ExpoAgro LLP.

From 2013 to 2015, he worked within the subsidiaries of Kazakhstan Temir Joly. In 2013, he was a chief procurement specialist at Remlokomotiv JSC. From 2013 to 2014, he worked as a chief specialist at the Center for the Development of Import-Substituting Industries. From 2014 to 2015, he served as the director for legal affairs and technology transfer at TemirZhol Electrification LLP.

In December 2015, Älimqulov founded and headed Aru-Tas LLP in Astana, a company focused on the production and wholesale of concrete construction materials. On 26 February 2020, he was appointed head of the Territorial Department of the Committee for Atomic and Energy Supervision and Control under the Ministry of Energy in the Turkistan Region. Due to this appointment, he resigned from his position at Aru-Tas.

From January to May 2023, during his final semester at the Columbia University School of International and Public Affairs, he worked as an assistant in the university's energy department. Concurrently, he completed an internship as a consultant for Equinor on an LNG terminal construction project in the Dominican Republic.

After returning to Kazakhstan, in September 2023, Älimqulov founded Teplotekhnika Plus LLP in the Jambyl Region, a company operating in solar energy, and became its director. In April 2026, he was concurrently appointed deputy executive director of the Atomic Industry Development Association.

Following the legislative elections on 23 August 2026, the Adilet party, of which Älimqulov is a member, secured the majority of votes in the newly formed unicameral parliament, the Kurultai. On 27 August, the Central Election Commission registered Älimqulov as a member of the 1st Kurultai. The following day, during the inaugural session of the Kurultai, he joined the Committee on Economic Policy, Industry and Energy.

== Personal life ==
Älimqulov is married and speaks Russian, English and Turkish in addition to his native Kazakh.

== Awards ==
- Daryn State Youth Prize (2018)
- Gratitude of the president of Kazakhstan (2019)
