= Yekaterina Smyshlyayeva =

Kazakh public figure (born 1982)

MP Yekaterina Smyshlyayeva
- Екатерина Смышляева
- Smyshlyayeva in 2024

Member of the Kurultai
- Incumbent
- Assumed office 27 August 2026
- Constituency: Ädilet Party list

Member of the Mäjilis
- In office 14 January 2021 – 1 July 2026
- Constituency: Amanat Party list (2021–2023); Nur Otan Party list (2023–2026)

Member of the Kostanay Regional Mäslihat
- In office 2012–2021
- Constituency: district No. 8

Personal details
- Born: 8 February 1982 (age 44) Kostanay, Kazakh SSR, Soviet Union
- Party: Ädilet (since 2026)
- Other political affiliations: Amanat (formerly Nur Otan)
- Education: Kostanay Regional University; Kostroma State University; Moscow State Institute of International Relations
- Awards: Honored Worker of Kazakhstan; Order of Kurmet
- Website: Official profile on Kurultai website

Yekaterina Vasilyevna Smyshlyayeva (Note: Kazakh: Екатерина Васильевна Смышляева) (Note: Russian: Екатерина Васильевна Смышляева) (born 8 February 1982) is a Kazakh public figure serving as the member of the 1st Kurultai since 2026. Previously, she was a member of the Mäjilis from 2021 to 2026 and member of the Kostanay Regional Mäslihat from 2012 to 2021.

== Biography ==
Yekaterina Vasilyevna Smyshlyayeva was born on 8 February 1982 in Kostanay, Soviet Kazakhstan.

In 2003, Smyshlyayeva graduated from Kostanay Regional University with a degree in chemistry education and taught at the university's Department of Chemistry for two years. After earning her master's degree from the same university in 2005, she worked for one year as deputy head for educational work and public concord at the Agrarian and Biological Institute.

From 2006 to 2008, she headed the Kostanay regional pedagogical squad "Rovesnik". From 2008 to 2013, she served as a youth policy consultant in the ideological and socio-political department of the Kostanay regional branch of the Nur Otan party.

In 2009, she graduated from Kostroma State University in Russia, where she earned the academic degree of Candidate of Pedagogical Sciences.

In 2012, Smyshlyayeva was elected to the 5th convocation of the Kostanay Regional Mäslihat from electoral district No. 8 and became chair of the Commission on Education and Youth Affairs. She was re-elected to the in 2016.

Alongside her mäslihat duties, from 2013 to 2015, she worked part-time as deputy chief physician for marketing at the Kostanay Perinatal Center. On 23 December 2015, the Federation of Trade Unions of Kazakhstan elected her chair of the Trade Union Center of the Kostanay Region.

Following the 2021 legislative election, Smyshlyayeva was registered on 14 January as a member of the 7th Mäjilis from the Nur Otan party. She stepped down from her position at the regional trade union center on the same day. She was re-elected to the 8th Mäjilis in 2023 representing Amanat (formerly Nur Otan).

In 2025, she earned a master's degree in international law from the Moscow State Institute of International Relations.

In June 2026, Amanat merged into the newly formed Adilet party, where Smyshlyayeva retained her membership.

On 1 July 2026, the mandates of all members of parliament were automatically terminated following the implementation of a new Constitution of Kazakhstan, which replaced the bicameral parliament with a unicameral Kurultai.

On 21 July Smyshlyayeva was registered as a candidate for the Kurultai. In the legislative elections held on 23 August 2026, the Ädilet party, under which Smyshlyayeva ran, won the majority of votes. On August 27, the Central Election Commission confirmed Smyshlyayeva's election as a member of the 1st Kurultai. The following day, during the inaugural session of the Kurultai, she was elected Deputy Chairwoman of the Committee on Digitalization, Innovation, and Science.

== Awards ==
- Honored Worker of Kazakhstan (2026)
- Order of Kurmet (2024)
- Certificate of Honor of Kazakhstan (2020)
