= Natalia Godunova =

Kazakh politician (born 1972)

MP Natalia Godunova
- Наталья Годунова
- Godunova in 2023

Member of the Kurultai
- Incumbent
- Assumed office 27 August 2026
- Constituency: Ädilet Party list

Chair of the Supreme Audit Chamber
- In office 28 November 2022 – 1 April 2024
- President: Kassym-Jomart Tokayev
- Preceded by: Office established, herself as Chair of the Accounts Committee for Control over Implementation of the Republican Budget
- Succeeded by: Älihan Smaiylov

Chairwoman of the Accounts Committee for Control over Implementation of the Republican Budget
- In office 20 February 2018 – 28 November 2022
- President: Nursultan Nazarbayev; Kassym-Jomart Tokayev
- Preceded by: Nurmuhambet Äbdibekov
- Succeeded by: Office abolished, herself as chair of the Supreme Audit Chamber

Personal details
- Born: 24 May 1972 (age 54) Uralsk, Kazakh SSR, Soviet Union
- Party: Ädilet (since 2026)
- Other political affiliations: Nur Otan, Amanat
- Education: West Kazakhstan Agricultural Institute; Financial Academy of Russia
- Awards: Order of Kurmet; Order of Parasat
- Website: Official profile in Kurultai

Natalia Nikolayevna Godunova (Russian: Наталья Николаевна Годунова; born 24 May 1972) is a Kazakh economist and politician serving as the member of the 1st Kurultai since 2026. Previously, she was chairwoman of the Supreme Audit Chamber from 2018 to 2024.

== Early life and education ==
Natalia Godunova as chairwoman of the Accounts Committee, 5 June 2018

Natalia Nikolaevna Godunova was born on 24 May 1972 in Uralsk, Kazakh SSR, Soviet Union.

In 1993, Godunova graduated from the West Kazakhstan Agricultural Institute with a degree in economics. She later graduated from the Financial Academy of Russia, though the specific years of her enrollment are not specified in her official biography.

Following her graduation in 1993, Godunova spent three years working as an economist in the credit department of the Agroprombank Oral in her hometown.

In 1997, Godunova joined the West Kazakhstan Territorial Committee for State Property and Privatization as a leading specialist. Within a year, she was promoted to deputy head and subsequently to head of the committee. From 1998 to 2004, she served in the administration of the regional akim (governor) as a chief specialist and head of the Economic Reforms Department, serving under akims Qabibolla Zhaqypov, Qyrymbek Köşerbaev, and Nurgali Aşimov. From 2004 to 2005, she led the Regional Department of Economy and Budget Planning.

== Early career ==
From 2005 to 2006, Godunova worked as an economic advisor at the Trade Representation of Kazakhstan in the Russia. She then served as an advisor to the akim of the Mangystau Region, Qyrymbek Köşerbaev, from 2006 to 2009.

In 2009, she returned to the Trade Representation of Kazakhstan in Russia, where she served as a consultant, deputy head, and acting head until 2012.

== Political career ==
In 2012, when Köşerbaev was appointed deputy PM, Natalia Godunova became his economic advisor. According to her financial disclosure, Godunova's annual income in 2012 totaled 10,146,221 tenge ($67,000).

On 7 March 2013, following Köşerbaev's appointment as akim of the Kyzylorda Region, he named Godunova his deputy for economy and finance.

On 21 December 2015, Godunova succeeded Qairat Satybaldy as the secretary of the Nur Otan party.

On 20 December 2017, upon the nomination by the Mäjilis speaker Nurlan Nigmatulin, she was elected a member of the Central Election Commission (CEC).

Three months later, on 20 February 2018, president Nursultan Nazarbayev appointed Godunova chairwoman of the Accounts Committee for Control over Implementation of the Republican Budget and her tenure at the CEC subsequently ended on 28 February. On 1 March 2019, she joined the Political Council Bureau of the Nur Otan, a position she held until January 2022.

Following the June 2022 constitutional referendum, which mandated the restructuring of the Accounts Committee into the Supreme Audit Chamber, president Kassym-Jomart Tokayev appointed Godunova as its chairwoman on November 28. On 1 April 2024, following nationwide flooding, Tokayev dismissed Godunova from post.

Three days later, on 4 April, by the decision of the Samruk-Kazyna, Godunova was elected as an independent director and joined the board of directors of Kazakhstan Temir Joly.

On 21 January 2026, she joined the Commission on Constitutional Reform. The reform culminated on March 15 with the adoption of a new Constitution of Kazakhstan, which replaced the bicameral parliament with a unicameral Kurultai. In June of the same year, the Amanat party (formerly Nur Otan) merged into the newly formed Adilet party, where Godunova maintained her membership.

In the Kurultai elections held on 23 August 2026, the Adilet secured a majority of votes. On 27 August, the Central Election Commission registered Natalia Godunova as a member of the 1st Kurultai, after which she was relieved of his post in KTJ. The following day, during the first session of the Kurultai, Godunova was elected chairman of the Committee on Economic Policy, Industry, and Energy.

== Awards ==
- Medal "10 Years of the Independence of Kazakhstan" (2002).
- Certificate of Honour of Kazakhstan (2008).
- Order of Kurmet (2016).
- Medal "25 Years of the Assembly of People of Kazakhstan" (2020).
- Medal "25 Years of the Constitution of Kazakhstan" (2020).
- Medal "30 Years of the Independence of Kazakhstan" (2021).
- Order of Parasat (2021).
- Badge "Excellent Worker of State Audit and Financial Control" (2023).
