= Abai Altai =

Kazakh politician (born 1991)

MP Abai Altai
- Абай Алтай

Member of the Kurultai
- Incumbent
- Assumed office 27 August 2026
- Party list: Ädilet

Personal details
- Born: 17 January 1991 (age 35) Aktobe, Kazakh SSR, Soviet Union
- Party: Ädilet (since 2026)
- Education: Eurasian National University; Cardiff University
- Awards: Order of Kurmet; Medal for Distinguished Labor

Abai Altai (Note: Often transliterated as Abay Altay through a Russified Romanization of Абай Алтай.) (Kazakh: Абай Алтай; born 17 January 1991) is a Kazakh politician serving as the member of the 1st Kurultai from the Ädilet party list.

== Early life and education ==
Altai was born on 17 January 1991, in Aktobe.

In 2011, he graduated from the Eurasian National University with a degree in area studies and earned an MBA from the Cardiff University in 2013.

== Early career ==
In 2013, after returning from the United Kingdom, Altai joined the Accreditation Center of the Republican Center for Healthcare Development as a specialist.

From 2014 to 2020, he served in the Senate's Office (Apparatus) of Kazakhstan under Kassym-Jomart Tokayev. During this period, he successively held the positions of assistant to the deputy chairman of the Senate (2014–2016), chief consultant of the Department for Inter-Parliamentary Relations and International Cooperation (2016–2018), assistant to the chairman of the Senate (2018–2019), and deputy head of the secretariat of the chairman of Tokayev (2019–2020).

Following Tokayev's assumption of the presidency, Altai transferred to the Presidential Protocol Service in 2020, where he worked as a consultant, inspector, and head of sector until 2022. From 2022 to 2023, he headed the Department of Official Events and Foreign Relations within the president's Directorate.

== Political career ==
On 7 June 2023, president Kassym-Jomart Tokayev appointed Altai as deputy head of the president's Directorate, serving under Aibek Dädebai.

Following the legislative elections on 23 August 2026, the Adilet party, of which Altai is a member, secured the majority of votes in the newly formed unicameral parliament, the Kurultai. On 27 August, the Central Election Commission registered Altai as a member of the 1st Kurultai, after which he was relieved of his post as deputy head of the president's Directorate.

== Awards ==
- Order of Kurmet.
- Medal for Distinguished Labor.

== Personal life ==
Altai has no publicly available information about his personal life, and speaks Russian and English, in addition to his native Kazakh.
