= Rusana Sulaimonova =

Kazakh public figure (born 1999)

- Русана Сулаймонова

Member of the Kurultai
- Incumbent
- Assumed office 27 August 2026
- Party list: Ädilet

Member of the Pavlodar City Maslihat
- In office 30 March 2023 – 1 July 2026
- Party list: Amanat

Personal details
- Born: Rusana Ruslanqyzy Samekova; 19 August 1999 (age 27)
- Party: Ädilet
- Other political affiliations: Amanat (Note: On June 2026, Amanat merged into Adilet.)
- Children: 1
- Education: Pavlodar Pedagogical University

Rusana Ruslanqyzy Sulaimonova (Note: Often transliterated as Rusana Ruslanovna Sulaimonova through a Russified Romanization of Русана Руслановна Сулаймонова.) (Kazakh: Русана Русланқызы Сулаймонова; née Samekova, Kazakh: Русана Русланқызы Сәмекова; born August 19, 1999) is a Kazakh politician and public figure serving as the member of the 1st Kurultai.

== Early life and education ==
Rusana Ruslanqyzy Sulaimonova was born on August 19, 1999.

In 2023, media outlets recorded her surname as Samekova, but in 2026, the Central Election Commission registered her under the surname as Sulaimonova.

From 2017 to 2021, Sulaimonova studied biology at the Pavlodar Pedagogical University, where she subsequently earned her master's degree in 2023.

In April 2019, Sulaimonova began working at the Pavlodar branch of the “Jasyl El” youth organization as a chief youth specialist. In March 2020, she was promoted to regional manager (commander of the Pavlodar city headquarters) in March 2020. A year later, in March 2021, she became the commissioner of the youth labor detachment. In March 2022, she reassumed the role of regional manager, transitioning from the city to the Pavlodar regional headquarters. On April 16, 2022, she was appointed head of the Pavlodar city branch of “Jasyl El”.

== Political career ==
Following the 2023 legislative elections, Rusana Sulaimonova became a member of Pavlodar City Maslihat of 8th convocation on 30 March 2023, representing the Amanat party.

In June 2026, the Amanat party merged into the newly formed Adilet party, with Sulaimonova retaining her membership.

On 1 July 2026, the mandates of all members of parliament and local maslihats were automatically terminated following the implementation of a new Constitution of Kazakhstan, which replaced the bicameral parliament with a unicameral Kurultai.

Following the elections for the new unicameral Kurultai held on 23 August of the same year, Sulaimonova secured a parliamentary mandate. On 27 August Central Election Commission registered her as a member of the Kurultai of the 1st convocation from the Adilet party list.

== Personal life ==
Rusana Sulaimonova is married and has a child.
