= Qarlygaş Jamanqulova =

Kazakh public figure (born 1982)

MP Qarlygaş Jamanqulova
- Қарлығаш Жаманқұлова

Member of the Kurultai
- Incumbent
- Assumed office 27 August 2026
- Party list: Ädilet

Personal details
- Born: 17 March 1982 (age 44)
- Party: Ädilet (since 2026)
- Education: Al-Farabi Kazakh National University; Columbia University School of International and Public Affairs
- Awards: Medal for Distinguished Labor

Qarlygaş Qalibekqyzy Jamanqulova (Note: Often transliterated as Karlygash Kalibekovna Dzhamankulova through a Russified Romanization of Карлыгаш Калибековна Джаманкулова.) (Note: Kazakh: Қарлығаш Қалибекқызы Жаманқұлова) (born 17 March 1982) is a Kazakh public figure and politician who has served as a member of the 1st Kurultai since 2026. She is a co-founder of the ruling party Ädilet and co-author of the Constitution of Kazakhstan.

== Early life, career and education ==
Qarlygaş Qalibekqyzy Jamanqulova was born on 17 March 1982.

Following her graduation from Al-Farabi Kazakh National University in 2004, Jamanqulova served as the Director General of the Youth Information Service of Kazakhstan until 2006. Concurrently, in 2005, she acted as an OSCE international observer in Moldova. In 2006, she graduated from the Columbia University School of International and Public Affairs. The following year, she managed the World Bank's "Youth Voices Initiatives" project in Central Asia.

In 2008, Jamanqulova worked in the US as an election consultant for Egypt at the National Democratic Institute. The same year, she completed her studies at Kazakh National University and spent two years teaching at the Faculty of Journalism, while simultaneously working as a PR consultant at R.May Consulting Group. In 2009, she returned to the National Democratic Institute to serve as an election consultant for Afghanistan and Lebanon.

In 2010, Jamankulova was appointed press secretary of the Delegation of the European Union to Kazakhstan. After six years in this role, she joined the US Embassy in Kazakhstan in 2016 as a Media Advisor for Central Asia, serving under Ambassadors George A. Krol and William H. Moser.

== Political career ==
On 7 December 2022, amid widespread public criticism of Kazakhstan's new law "On Mass Media," Tamara Kaleeva, the founder of the media advocacy organization Adil Soz (Kazakh: Әділ сөз), stepped down as president of the foundation and handed over the leadership to Qarlygaş Jamanqulova. During her tenure at the foundation, Jamanqulova actively criticized the government and legislative bills that hindered journalistic work, while also defending journalists and activists.

In a 2026 interview, Tamara Kaleeva stated that she had made a mistake in choosing her successor. Kaleeva claimed that Jamanqulova had destroyed the foundation's website, library, and logo. She further noted that Jamanqulova failed to relocate from Astana to Almaty despite her initial promises, managing the foundation from Astana while the main office remained in Almaty.

After president Kassym-Jomart Tokayev proposed abolishing the Senate and transitioning to a unicameral parliament in September 2025, he appointed Jamanqulova to the working group on parliamentary reform. Following Tokayev's subsequent statement in January 2026, that the transition to a unicameral system would require an entirely new Constitution, Jamanqulova joined the Commission on Constitutional Reform. This process culminated in the adoption of a new Constitution of Kazakhstan which replaced the existing bicameral parliament with a unicameral Kurultai.

On 15 April 2026, ahead of the parliamentary elections, Jamanqulova joined a 15-member initiative group that announced the creation of a new political party named Ädilet. At the party's founding congress on 7 May she was elected to the Bureau of the Political Council. According to Jamanqulova, the initiative to form the new party emerged during her work on the Constitution and was finalized after the national referendum. On 13 July, she resigning from Adil Soz and a week after registered as a candidate for the Kurultai elections.

In the elections held on 23 August 2026, the Ädilet secured a majority of votes. On 27 August, the Central Election Commission confirmed Jamanqulova's election as a member of the 1st Kurultai. The following day, during the inaugural session of the Kurultai, she joined the Committee on International Affairs, Defense and Security.

== Awards ==
- Medal for Distinguished Labor (2025)
- Medal "30Years of the Constitution of Kazakhstan" (2025)

== Personal life ==
Qarlygaş Jamanqulova has no publicly available information about his personal life.
