= Kendebai Adambek =

Kazakh intelligence officer and politician (born 1965)

Major general Kendebai Adambek
- Кендебай Адамбек

Member of the Kurultai
- Incumbent
- Assumed office 27 August 2026
- Party list: Ädilet

Member of the Astana City Mäslihat
- In office 29 March 2023 – 1 July 2026
- Party list: Amanat

Personal details
- Born: 22 September 1965 (age 61) Qoñyrat, Balqash, Qarağandy Region, Kazakh SSR, Soviet Union
- Party: Ädilet (since 2026)
- Other political affiliations: Amanat (2023–2026)
- Children: 2
- Education: Karaganda State Technical University; Femida Legal Academy

Military service
- Allegiance: Soviet Union; Kazakhstan
- Branch/service: Soviet Armed Forces; National Security Committee
- Service years: 1983–1985; 1995–2022
- Rank: Major general of National Security

Kendebai Sarybaiūly Adambek (Note: Kazakh: Кендебай Сарыбайұлы Адамбек) (Note: Kazakh: Кендебай Сарыбайулы Адамбек) (né Adambekov; born 22 September 1965) is a Kazakh intelligence officer and politician serving as the member of the 1st Kurultai since 2026. Previously, he was a member of the Astana City Mäslihat from 2023 to 2026. He also holds the rank of major general of National Security since 2017.

== Early life, military service and early career ==
Kendebai Sarybaiūly Adambek was born on 22 September 1965 in Qoñyrat, a village in Balqash city, Qarağandy Region, Soviet Kazakhstan.

After graduating from Secondary School No. 25 in 1982, Adambek enrolled in the Karaganda State Technical University. Upon completing his first year in 1983, he was conscripted into the Soviet Armed Forces for compulsory military service. He served in the Soviet Radio-Technical Troops in the village of Elabuga, Khabarovsk Krai, where he held the position of squad leader. He completed his service in November 1985 with the rank of sergeant and subsequently resumed his studies at the Karaganda Polytechnic Institute.

In 1989, he graduated with a degree in mining engineering, and began working as an electric assembler, later becoming an electromedic at the mine of the Akbakai Mining and Processing Plant in the Aqbaqai of the Zhambyl Region. In September of the following year, he returned to his hometown of Qoñyrat, where until 1995 he worked at the Qoñyrat Vocational and Technical School No. 5. During his tenure, he advanced from instructor to senior instructor, deputy director, and ultimately, director of the institution.

== NSC service ==
In June 1995, at the age of 29, Adambekov was offered three career paths: head of the internal politics department at the Balqash city administration, director of a commercial enterprise, or a post in the Department of the National Security Committee (NSC) of the Karaganda Region. He chose the latter, despite facing skepticism from colleagues who questioned his preference for a junior operative role over an executive directorship.

As recalled by former NSC Chairman Vladimir Jumaqanov, who then headed one of the committee's departments, Adambek's candidacy was recommended to him in the spring of 2002. Jumaqanov approved his appointment, citing Adambek's extensive counter-intelligence experience and civil background. Jumaqanov later noted Adambek's significant contribution to strengthening the Anti-Terrorism Center, emphasizing that he personally conducted negotiations with members of parliament, introduced draft legislation, and advanced international cooperation in counter-terrorism.

In 2003, Adambekov expanded his qualifications by graduating from the Femida Legal Academy with a degree in law.

According to reports by the current Deputy Chairman of the NSC, Baqytbek Raqymberdiev, under Adambek's leadership, the Karaganda Region NSC Department executed several high-profile operations. In 2016, the department foiled a terrorist plot in Balkhash, detaining 10 members of a radical group. In 2017, operatives identified two radicals plotting attacks in Kazakhstan and Russia, and neutralized three other Islamic State sympathizers planning assaults in crowded public areas. In 2020, the department dismantled a terrorist cell that targeted the Köktöbe hill in Almaty. Over this period, the regional directorate disrupted a total of six terrorist cells, resulting in the conviction of more than 115 radicals and the complete neutralization of a foreign terrorist facilitation network.

The exact dates of Adambek's appointment as Head of the Karaganda Region NSC Department and his eventual dismissal are not available in public records. It is documented that by 2013 he served as chief of staff of the Anti-Terrorism Center, and by 2016 he already led the Karaganda Region NSC Directorate. Open-source data indicates that he officially concluded his service in December 2022, though a leadership transition at the regional department took place earlier, in July of the same year.

== Political positions ==
Following 27 years of service in the NSC, in January 2023, Adambek was appointed advisor to the newly appointed Mayor of Astana, Jenis Qasymbek.

Following the 2023 Kazakh local elections, on 29 March 2023, he was registered as a member of the Astana City Mäslihat of the 8th convocation, representing the Amanat party. The following day, he was chosen to chair the Mäslihat Commission on Budget, Economy, Industry, and Entrepreneurship.

In June 2026, the Amanat party merged into the newly formed Ädilet party, with Adambek retaining her membership.

On July 1, 2026, the mandates of all members of parliament and local maslihats were automatically terminated following the implementation of a new Constitution of Kazakhstan, which replaced the bicameral parliament with a unicameral Kurultai. On 21 July Adambek was registered as a candidate for the Kurultai. In the legislative elections held on 23 August 2026, the Ädilet party, under which Adambek ran, won the majority of votes. On August 27, the Central Election Commission confirmed Kendebai Adambek's election as a member of the 1st Kurultai. The following day, during the inaugural session of the Kurultai, he joined the Committee on Finance and Budget.

== Personal life ==
Adambek is married and has three children. Also he speaks Russian in addition to his native Kazakh.

== Awards and honours ==
- Order of Glory 2nd Class (2021)
- Honorary Citizen of the Balqash city (2020)
- Order of Valor 2nd Class (2013)
- Medal "For Military Valor" (2005)
- Medal "For Contribution to Ensuring National Security"
- Breastplate "Honorary Officer of the National Security Committee of Kazakhstan"

== Ranks ==
- Sergeant (1985)
- Major general of National Security (2017)
