= Ämirbek Ospanbekov =

Kazakh politician (born 1964)

MP Ämirbek Ospanbekov
- Әмірбек Оспанбеков

Member of the 1st Kurultai
- Incumbent
- Assumed office 27 August 2026
- Constituency: Ädilet party list

Personal details
- Born: 29 November 1982 (age 43)
- Party: Ädilet (since 2026)
- Education: Karagandy Law Institute; Turan Astana University
- Awards: Order of Kurmet
- Website: Official profile on Kurultai website

Ämirbek Qanatbekūly Ospanbekov (Note: Kazakh: Әмірбек Қанатбекұлы Оспанбеков) (Note: Often transliterated as Amirbek Kanatbekovich Ospanbekov through a Russified Romanization of Амирбек Канатбекович Оспанбеков.) (born 29 November 1982) is a Kazakh statesman serving as the member of the 1st Kurultai since 2026.

== Biography ==
Ämirbek Qanatbekūly Ospanbekov was born 29 November 1982.

He studied at the Karagandy Law Institute received a law degree in 2004 and earned a degree in economics from the Turan Astana University in 2012.

According to Ospanbekov's official biography, he served in the internal affairs bodies from 2000 to 2007. From 2007 to 2021, he held various positions in the structural divisions of the Senate of Kazakhstan, including during Kassym-Jomart Tokayev's two terms as Chairman of the Senate. From 2007 and 2010, Ospanbekov worked as an assistant to a senator (whose name is not specified in his biography). He then served as chief consultant of the Department for Cooperation with the Committee on International Relations, Defense and Security from 2010 to 2013, and as deputy head of the Organizational, Control and Personnel Department from 2013 to 2019.

From 2019 to 2021, he headed the Department of Personnel Work and Information Security of the Senate Office.

In June 2021, President Tokayev appointed Ospanbekov deputy head of the chancellery of the president.

Following the nationwide protests in Kazakhstan in early 2022, Ospanbekov was appointed representative of the president in Parliament on 12 February 2022.

On 1 July 2026, a new Constitution of Kazakhstan entered into force, replacing the bicameral Parliament with a unicameral Kurultai. Consequently, Ospanbekov's position was abolished, and he was relieved of the post the day before. On 21 July Ospanbekov was registered as a candidate for the Kurultai. In the legislative elections held on 23 August 2026, the Ädilet party, under which Ospanbekov ran, won the majority of votes. On 27 August, the Central Election Commission registered Ospanbekov as a member of the 1st Kurultai. The following day, at the first session of the Kurultai, he was elected chair of the Committee on Regional and Infrastructure Development.

== Awards and honours ==
- Order of Kurmet
- Certificate of Honor of Kazakhstan
