= Erbol Adaev =

Kazakh politician (born 1978)

MP Erbol Adaev
- Ербол Адаев

Member of the Kurultai
- Incumbent
- Assumed office 27 August 2026
- Party list: Ädilet

Parliamentary leader of Ädilet in the Kurultai
- Incumbent
- Assumed office 1 September 2026
- Preceded by: Office established

Personal details
- Born: 25 September 1978 (age 48) Taldykorgan, Almaty Region, Kazakh SSR, Soviet Union
- Party: Ädilet (since 2026)
- Education: Kostanay State University; Kazakh Humanities and Law University
- Awards: Order of Kurmet

Erbol Dänenūly Adaev (Note: Often transliterated as Erbol Danenovich Adayev through a Russified Romanization of Ербол Даненович Адаев.) (Note: Kazakh: Ербол Дәненұлы Адаев) (born 25 September 1978) is a Kazakh politician serving as the member of the 1st Kurultai and parliamentary leader of Ädilet in the Kurultai since 2026. Previously, he was head of the General Department of the Presidential Administration from 2025 to 2026 under Aibek Dädebai.

== Early life and education ==
Erbol Danenuly Adaev was born on 25 September 1978 in Taldykorgan, a city in Almaty Region, Soviet Kazakhstan.

In 1999, upon graduating from Kostanay State University, Adaev began his career as a leading specialist in the Youth Policy Department of the Kostanay Regional Department of Information and Public Accord. Over the next three years, from 2001 to 2004, he worked as a chief specialist in the Departments of Internal Policy and Social Sphere, as well as Information Policy and Public Relations within the Department of Internal Policy and Social Sphere of the Kostanay Region akim's Office. From 2004 to 2005, Adayev served as an advisor to the akim of Kostanay, and later that year, he headed the city’s Department of Internal Policy. From 2005 to 2006, he worked as a chief inspector to the akim of Kostanay; in 2006, as an assistant to the deputy Akim of the Kostanay Region; and from 2006 to 2007, as a chief specialist in the Electronic Media Monitoring Department of the Information and Archives Committee under the Ministry of Culture and Information.

From 2007 to 2022, Adaev held various positions in structural units of the Senate, serving through two terms of Kassym-Jomart Tokayev's chairmanship. His posts included chief consultant and chief expert of the Press Service (2007–2010); assistant to the Head of the Office (2010–2011); chief expert of the Editorial and Publishing Department (2011); assistant to the Head of the Office once again (2011–2012); and chief consultant of the Editorial and Publishing Department (2012–2013).

In 2014, he graduated from the Kazakh Humanities and Law University.

After Tokayev returned as Senate speaker in 2013, Adaev became the chief consultant of the Department of Organizational-Control and Personnel Work in the Senate Office. From 2017 to 2022, he served as deputy head of the Department of Organizational-Control and Personnel Work in the Senate Office.

== Political career ==
Following nationwide protests across Kazakhstan triggered by a sharp rise in liquefied gas prices in 2022, Adaev headed the Department of Organizational-Control and Personnel Work in the president's Directorate.

On 17 February 2025, Tokayev appointed Adaev as head of the General Department within his Administration under Aibek Dädebai.

On 1 July 2026, a new Constitution of Kazakhstan entered into force, replacing the bicameral parliament with a unicameral Kurultai. On 21 July Adaev was registered as a candidate for the Kurultai.

In the legislative elections held on 23 August 2026, the Ädilet party, under which Adaev ran, won the majority of votes. On 27 August, the Central Election Commission confirmed Erbol Adaev's election as a member of the 1st Kurultai, following which he was relieved of his post in Presidential Administration. The following day, during the inaugural session of the Kurultai, he joined the Committee on Digitalization, Innovation, and Science. On 1 September, he was elected parliamentary leader of Ädilet in the Kurultai.

== Awards ==
- Order of Kurmet (2024)
- Honorary Certificate of Kazakhstan (2019)
