= Irina Ten =

Kazakh journalist and politician (born 1992)

MP Irina Ten
- Ирина Тен

Member of the Kurultai
- Incumbent
- Assumed office 27 August 2026
- Party list: Ädilet

Personal details
- Born: 16 December 1992 (age 33) Aral, Qyzylorda Region, Kazakhstan
- Party: Ädilet
- Children: 2
- Education: Al-Farabi Kazakh National University
- Website: Official profile on Kurultai website

Irina Sergeevna Ten (Note: Russian: Ирина Сергеевна Тен) (Note: Kazakh: Ирина Сергеевна Тен) (born 16 December 1992) is a Kazakh journalist serving as the member of the 1st Kurultai since 2026.

== Biography ==
Irina Sergeevna Ten was born on 16 December 1992 in Aral, a city in Qyzylorda Region, Kazakhstan into an ethnic Korean family. Although her family was Russian-speaking, she spoke Kazakh with her childhood friends. She attended Russian Secondary School No. 14, where she regularly participated in academic olympiads in Kazakh language and literature.

In 2010, she moved to Almaty and enrolled in the Faculty of Journalism at the Al-Farabi Kazakh National University. According to her, she fell just a few points short of securing a state tuition grant. Concurrently that same year, she began working as a correspondent for the "Your Morning" (Russian: Твоё утро) program on the Tan television channel, where she hosted the segment "Your Press" (Russian: Твоя пресса) covering reviews of Kazakhstani print media.

In 2012, Irina Ten moved to the Qazaqstan national television channel; however, public sources do not specify which programs she hosted other than "Tansholpan" (Kazakh: Таңшолпан). She graduated from the university in 2014.

She also runs her own project, the Sayra Networking Club.

On 23 August 2026, elections were held for the new unicameral parliament, the Kurultai, in which the Ädilet party, with Irina Ten running as a candidate, secured the most votes. On August 27, the Central Election Commission registered Ten as a member of the 1st Kurultai. The following day, during the inaugural session of the Kurultai, she joined the Committee on International Affairs, Defense and Security.

== Personal life ==
Irina Ten is married and has two children. Her parents are entrepreneurs. Ten considers herself bilingual and is completely fluent in both Kazakh and Russian.

== Awards ==
- Altyn Barys Badge of Honor (2025).
- Medal “Charity” (2018).
- Daryn State Youth Prize (2016).
