= Armangül Toqtamurat =

Kazakh journalist (born 1985)

MP Armangül Toqtamurat
- Армангүл Тоқтамұрат

Member of the Kurultai
- Incumbent
- Assumed office 27 August 2026
- Party list: Ädilet

Personal details
- Born: 25 April 1985 (age 41)
- Party: Ädilet
- Education: Eurasian National University
- Awards: Order of Kurmet

Armangül Toqtamurat (Note: Often transliterated as Armangul Toktamurat through a Russified Romanization of Армангуль Токтамурат.) (Note: Kazakh: Армангүл Тоқтамұрат) (born 25 April 1985) is a Kazakh journalist serving as the member of the 1st Kurultai since 2026.

== Biography ==
Armangul Toqtamurat was born on 25 April 1985.

In 2006, after graduating Eurasian National University with a degree in sociology, she joined the Department of Internal Policy of Astana as a freelance staff member in the department for relations with political parties.

In 2007, Toqtamurat moved to the ERA Television Company, where she consecutively worked as a correspondent for the social talk show Times (Kazakh: Замана) and the information-analytical program Mirror of the Week (Kazakh: Апта айнасы). From 2008 to 2010, she served as a correspondent, presenter, and editor for the news program News (Kazakh: Жаңалықтар), and also hosted the program The New Era of Astana (Kazakh: Астананың жаңа дәуірі).

In 2010, Toqtamurat joined Astana TV, working as a managing editor and news presenter until 2012. Consecutively, from 2012 to 2014, she served as an expert editor and host of her own analytical program, Diary with Armangul Toqtamurat (Kazakh: Армангүл Тоқтамұратпен күнделік). In 2014, she collaborated with the 24KZ TV channel as a presenter, journalist, and editor for the program Republic – 2050, before returning to Channel 7 (formerly ERA) as a journalist and host of the expert program Target.

Since 2015, Toqtamurat's career has been closely tied to the Qazaqstan National TV Channel. During her first four years there, she worked as a lead correspondent for the “News” news department and was a member of the presidential press pool. From 2019 to 2022, she served as the evening presenter for the news program “Information”.

In 2020, she obtained her master's degree from Eurasian National University. Following a brief return to Astana TV in 2022 as the author and host of the weekly analytical program Sarap Times, Toqtamurat resumed her work at Qazaqstan. From 2022 to 2024, she served as a presenter-editor for Aqparat, and in 2024, she was appointed chief editor of the program while simultaneously producing and hosting an interactive project.

In the Kurultai elections held on August 23, 2026, the Ädilet party secured a majority of votes. On August 27, the Central Election Commission registered Armangul Toqtamurat as a member of the 1st Kurultai.

== Criticism ==
On 28 August 2026, following the opening of the Kurultai, Armangul Toqtamurat became the center of a public controversy. Despite her background in journalism, she evaded questions from former colleagues regarding the legality of her receiving a state-subsidized apartment while allegedly owning a business-class property, hastily retreating into the building. Amid a video recording of her departure that circulated widely on social media, the incident triggered a significant wave of criticism and allegations of double standards from both the public and the journalistic community.

== Awards ==
- Order of Kurmet (2026)
- Presidential Award of Kazakhstan in the Field of Media (2025)
- Medal “Charity” (2023)

== Personal life ==
Toqtamurat has no publicly available information about his personal life.
