= Abilqaiyr Tamabek =

Kazakh politician (born 1994)

MP Äbılqaiyr Tamabek
- Әбілқайыр Тамабек
- Tamabek in 2023

Member of the Kurultai
- Incumbent
- Assumed office 27 August 2026
- Party list: Ädilet

Personal details
- Born: 5 July 1994 (age 32) Talas District, Jambyl Region, Kazakhstan
- Party: Ädilet
- Education: University of International Business; Wyższa Szkoła Biznesu – National-Louis University; Academy of Public Administration

Äbılqaiyr Ğalymūly Tamabek (Note: Often transliterated as Abulkhair Galymovich Tamabek through a Russified Romanization of Абулхаир Галымович Тамабек.) (Kazakh: Әбілқайыр Ғалымұлы Тамабек; born 5 July 1994) is a Kazakh politician serving as a Member of the 1st Kurultai from the Ädilet party list.

== Early life and education ==
Äbilqaiyr Ğalymūly Tamabek was born on 5 July 1994, in Talas District, Jambyl Region, Kazakhstan.

He graduated from the University of International Business with a degree in assessment. Tamabek studied at the Wyższa Szkoła Biznesu – National-Louis University in Poland, receiving a management degree in 2015 and earning a degree in public administration from the Academy of Public Administration in 2019.

== Early career ==
In 2015, Abilqaiyr Tamabek joined the Ministry of National Economy as an expert in the Department of Statistics, Services, and Energy under the Committee on Statistics.

In June 2017, he moved to the Ministry of Defense and Aerospace Industry, serving as an expert in the Personnel Management and Document Support Service within the Committee on State Material Reserves. He was promoted to head this service in 2018. Following the ministry's reorganization into the Ministry of Digital Development, Innovations, and Aerospace Industry in 2019, Tamabek became a chief expert in the Human Resources Management Department.

On 28 January 2020, by decree of the akim (governor) of Jambyl Region, Asqar Myrzahmetov, he was appointed head of the Land Use and Protection Control Department of the Regional Akimat.

== Political career ==
In February 2022, Abilqaiyr Tamabek took charge of the Jambyl Regional Department for Land Resources Management, concurrently serving as the chief state inspector for Land Use and Protection in the region.

After two months in this post, on 25 April 2022, PM Älihan Smaiylov appointed Tamabek as vice minister of agriculture, serving under minister Erbol Qaraşökeev. He resigned on 8 February 2024, following the dissolution of the Second Smaiylov Government.

The following day, on 9 February 2024, the newly appointed akim of Jambyl Region, Erbol Qaraşökeev, named Tamabek as his deputy, marking a continued professional association with his former superior.

Following the legislative elections on 23 August 2026, the Adilet party, of which Tamabek is a member, secured the majority of votes in the newly formed unicameral parliament, the Kurultai. On 27 August, the Central Election Commission officially registered Tamabek as a member of the 1st Kurultai. The next day, during the inaugural session of the Kurultai, he joined the Committee on Agrarian Issues, Ecology, and Natural Resources.

== Personal life ==
Tamabek has no publicly available information about his personal life, and speaks Russian and English, in addition to his native Kazakh.
