= Darhan Ahmediev =

Kazakh politician (born 1990)

MP Darhan Ahmediev
- Дархан Ахмедиев

Member of the Kurultai
- Incumbent
- Assumed office 27 August 2026
- Party list: Ädilet

Deputy Minister of Defense for Digitalization
- In office 15 April 2022 – 27 August 2026
- President: Kassym-Jomart Tokayev
- Minister: Ruslan Jaqsylyqov; Däuren Qosanov

Personal details
- Born: 21 December 1990 (age 35) Kazakh SSR, Soviet Union
- Party: Ädilet (since 2026)
- Children: 3
- Education: King's College London; Karagandy Technical University

Military service
- Allegiance: Kazakhstan
- Service: Ministry of Defense
- Years of service: 2022–2026

Darhan Meiramūly Ahmediev (Note: Often transliterated as Darkhan Meiramovich Akhmediev through a Russified Romanization of Дархан Мейрамович Ахмедиев.) (Kazakh: Дархан Мейрамұлы Ахмедиев; born 21 December 1990) is a Kazakh politician serving as a member of the 1st Kurultai from the Ädilet party list. Previously, he served as deputy minister of defense for digitalization from 2022 to 2026.

== Early life and education ==
Ahmediev was born on 21 December 1990 in the Kazakh SSR, the Soviet Union.

He graduated from Karagandy Technical University with a degree in information security systems. Later, under the Bolashak scholarship program, Ahmediev also earned a degree in cybersecurity from King's College London.

== Early career ==
Ahmediev began his career in 2012 as an analyst at National Information Technologies JSC.

From 2013 to 2015, he served as an expert at the Ministry of Emergency Situations and a chief expert at the Agency for Civil Service Affairs and Anti-Corruption.

From 2017 to 2022, Ahmediev held the positions of head of Division, deputy head, and subsequently head of the IT Development Department at the Ministry of Digital Development, Innovations and Aerospace Industry.

== Political career ==
On 15 April 2022, by president Kassym-Jomart Tokayev's decree Darhan Ahmediev was appointed deputy minister of defense for digitalization, serving under ministers Ruslan Jaqsylyqov and later Däuren Qosanov.

Following the legislative elections on 23 August 2026, the Adilet party, of which Ahmediev is a member, secured the majority of votes in the newly formed unicameral parliament, the Kurultai. On 27 August, the Central Election Commission registered Ahmediev as a member of the 1st Kurultai, after which he was relieved of his post as deputy minister of defense. The following day, during the first session of the Kurultai, Ahmediev was elected chairman of the Committee on Digitalization, Innovation, and Science.

== Personal life ==
Ahmediev is married and has three children. He speaks Russian, English and Turkish, in addition to his native Kazakh.
