= Marat Qojaev =

Kazakh politician (born 1964)

Lieutenant general Marat Qojaev
- Марат Қожаев
- Qojaev in 2024

Member of the 1st Kurultai
- Incumbent
- Assumed office 27 August 2026
- Constituency: Ädilet party list

Member of the Senate
- In office 4 October 2024 – 1 July 2026
- Appointed by: Kassym-Jomart Tokayev
- Preceded by: Läzzat Qaltaeva

First Deputy Minister of Internal Affairs
- In office 6 April 2019 – 4 October 2024
- President: Kassym-Jomart Tokayev
- Minister: Erlan Turgymbaev; Marat Ahmetjanov; Erjan Sädenov

Personal details
- Born: 23 February 1964 (age 62) Taran, Jambyl, Almaty Region, Kazakh SSR, Soviet Union
- Party: Ädilet (since 2026)
- Children: 1
- Education: Karaganda Higher School of the Ministry of Internal Affairs of the USSR; Almaty Academy of the Ministry of Internal Affairs of Kazakhstan
- Awards: Order of Glory; Order of Valor; Medal "For Impeccable Service"
- Website: Official profile on Kurultai website

Military service
- Allegiance: Soviet Union; Kazakhstan
- Branch/service: Soviet Army; Ministry of Internal Affairs of Kazakhstan
- Service years: 1982–1984; 1984–2024
- Rank: Police Lieutenant general

Marat Şädethanūly Qojaev (Note: Kazakh: Марат Шәдетханұлы Қожаев) (Note: Often transliterated as Marat Shadethkhanovich Kozhayev through a Russified Romanization of Марат Шадетханович Кожаев.) (born 23 February 1964) is a Kazakh lawyer and politician serving as the member of the 1st Kurultai since 2026. Previously, he was a member of the Senate from 2024 to 2026.

== Early life, education and early career ==
Marat Şädethanūly Qojaev was born on 23 February 1964, in Taran, a village in Jambyl District, Almaty Region, Soviet Kazakhstan.

In 1982, Qojaev was conscripted into mandatory military service in the Soviet Army. After returning in 1984, he worked as a police officer at the temporary detention facility of the Kaskelen District (now Karasay District) Department of Internal Affairs.

In 1985, he enrolled at the Karaganda Higher School of the Ministry of Internal Affairs of the USSR. Following his graduation in 1989, he served in the Departments of Internal Affairs of the Ile and Kaskelen districts until 1996. From 1996 to 1997, he worked as a senior investigator and department head at the Almaty Region Directorate of the State Investigative Committee, before serving in 1997 as head of the Investigative Service Division of the Almaty Region Department of Internal Affairs. Between 1997 and 2001, he was deputy head of the Investigative Service of the Eastern Department of Internal Affairs on Transport.

In 2001, Qojaev graduated from the Almaty Academy of the Ministry of Internal Affairs of Kazakhstan with a degree in law. From 2001 to 2004, he served sequentially as deputy head of the Investigative Directorate, head of the Inquiry Directorate, and head of the Investigative Directorate of the Almaty City Department of Internal Affairs. He then served as deputy head of the Almaty Department of Internal Affairs from 2004 to 2007, deputy head of the Almaty Department for Combating Economic and Corruption Crime from 2007 to 2009, and deputy head of the Jambyl Region Department of Internal Affairs from 2009 to 2012.

== Political career ==
On 23 February 2012, by decree of Minister of Internal Affairs Kalmukhanbet Kassymov, Qojaev was appointed head of the Investigative Committee of the Ministry of Internal Affairs. Following the committee's reorganization into the Investigative Department, Kassymov appointed him head of the Pavlodar Region Department of Internal Affairs on 13 September 2014, and head of the Astana Department of Internal Affairs on 11 December 2017.

On 6 April 2019, Kassym-Jomart Tokayev, who had recently assumed the presidency of Kazakhstan, appointed Qojaev First Deputy Minister of Internal Affairs under the new minister, Erlan Turgymbaev.

On 4 October 2024, Tokayev relieved Qojaev of this post and appointed him a member of the Senate, succeeding Läzzat Qaltaeva.. On 10 October, he joined the Committee on Constitutional Legislation, the Judicial System, and Law Enforcement Agencies.

On 1 July 2026, the mandates of all members of parliament were terminated following the implementation of a new Constitution of Kazakhstan. On 21 July Qojaev was registered as a candidate for the Kurultai. In the legislative elections held on 23 August 2026, the Ädilet party, under which Qojaev ran, won the majority of votes. On 27 August, the Central Election Commission registered Qojaev as a member of the 1st Kurultai. The following day, at the first session of the Kurultai, he was elected Chair of the Committee on International Affairs, Defense and Security.

== Awards and honours ==
- Order of Glory 1st and 2nd Class (2025, 2020)
- Order of Valor 2nd Class (2013)
- Medal "For Impeccable Service"
- "Honored Employee of the Ministry of Internal Affairs" Badge

== Military ranks ==
- Police Colonel (until 2015)
- Police Major general (2015)
- Police Lieutenant general (2022)

== Personal life ==
Qojaev is married and has a son. Also he speaks Russian in addition to his native Kazakh.
