= Baqtybek Bibaev =

Kazakh politician (born 1995)

MP Baqtybek Bibaev
- Бақтыбек Бибаев

Member of the Kurultai
- Incumbent
- Assumed office 27 August 2026
- Party list: Aq Jol

Personal details
- Born: 17 January 1995 (age 31) Atyrau, Kazakhstan
- Party: Aq Jol
- Education: China University of Petroleum
- Website: Official profile

Baqtybek Sälbekūly Bibaev (Note: Often transliterated as Baktybek Salbekovich Bibayev through a Russified Romanization of Бактыбек Сальбекович Бибаев.) (Kazakh: Бақтыбек Сәлбекұлы Бибаев; born 17 January 1995) is a Kazakh subsoil use expert serving as the member of the 1st Kurultai since 2026.

== Early life and education ==
Bibaev was born on 17 January 1995 in Atyrau.

In 2017, after graduating from the China University of Petroleum with a degree in petroleum engineering, Bibaev remained in China to work as a translator for the university's Institute of Continuing Education and earned a master's degree in 2019.

== Career ==
From 2018 to 2019, Baqtybek Bibaev served as the CIS Business Development Manager for the Chinese company Hebei Bolu Tianbao.

From 2019 to 2020, Bibaev worked as a representative and senior translator for China Oilfield Services on a semi-submersible drilling rig in the Arctic. In this role, he coordinated operations within a major joint hydrocarbon exploration project between the Chinese corporation and the Russian company Gazprom Geologorazvedka (Gazprom subsidiary).

Upon returning to Kazakhstan in 2021, Bibaev joined the Ministry of Energy as a chief expert in the Department of Subsoil User Appeals. In 2023, he transferred to the Department of Contracts and Addenda while retaining his rank as chief expert.

In 2024, Bibaev was appointed GR Director at Texol, a logistics and industrial group headquartered in his hometown of Atyrau.

== Political career ==
Following the legislative elections on 23 August 2026, the Aq Jol, of which Baqtybek Bibaev is a member, secured 8 seats in the newly formed unicameral parliament, the Kurultai. On 27 August, the Central Election Commission registered Bibaev as a member of the 1st Kurultai, after which he was relieved of his post in Texol.

== Personal life ==
Bibaev speaks Russian, English, and Chinese in addition to his native Kazakh.
