= Zamira Kuzieva =

Kazakhstani politician and businesswoman (born 1996)

MP Zamira Kuzieva
- Замира Кузиева

Member of the Kurultai
- Incumbent
- Assumed office 27 August 2026
- Party list: Ädilet

Personal details
- Born: 19 August 1996 (age 30) Almaty, Kazakhstan
- Party: Ädilet (since 2026)
- Parent: Zäkirjan Kuziev (father)
- Education: Turan University; Kazakh Agrotechnical University
- Awards: Medal for Distinguished Labor
- Website: Official profile

Zamira Zäkirjanqyzy Kuzieva (Note: Often transliterated as Zamira Zakirzhanovna Kuziyeva through a Russified Romanization of Замира Закиржановна Кузиева.) (Note: Kazakh: Замира Зәкіржанқызы Кузиева) (born 19 August 1996) is a Kazakhstani businesswoman and politician who has served as a member of the 1st Kurultai since 2026. She is a co-founder of the ruling party Ädilet.

== Biography ==
Zamira Kuzieva was born on 19 August 1996 in Almaty to Zäkirjan Kuziev, a businessman and former member of Majilis (2022–2023) and Senate (2023–2026).

After graduating from the International College of Business and Communications in 2015, she began her career as an operator at the Zharkent Starch and Syrup Factory, founded by her father. In 2016, she was appointed assistant technologist at the plant, and in 2018, she became the head of the development department.

After graduating from Turan University in 2019, Kuzieva joined the Unified Consolidating Center as a technologist, rising to deputy director after a year of service. In 2022, she was promoted to managing director, and in 2025, she took on the additional role of head of Kazkrahmal LLP.

In late December 2023, Kuzieva was the only woman present at a meeting president Kassym-Jomart Tokayev and Kazakh business community. In 2025, she graduated from the Kazakh Agrotechnical University.

On 15 April 2026, ahead of the Kurultai elections, Kuzieva joined a 15-member initiative group that announced the formation of a new political party, Ädilet. At the party's founding congress on 7 May, she was elected to the Bureau of the Political Council.

In the elections held on 23 August 2026, the Ädilet secured a majority of votes. On August 27, the Central Election Commission registered Zamira Kuzieva as a member of the 1st Kurultai. The following day, during the Kurultai's first session, she joined the Committee on Agrarian Issues, Ecology, and Natural Resources.

== Awards ==
- Medal for Distinguished Labor (2026)
- Honorary Badge "My labor for the country" (Kazakh: Еңбегім еліме)

== Personal life ==
Zamira Kuzieva has no publicly available information about his personal life.
