= Yulia Kuchinskaya =

Kazakh politician

MP Yulia Kuchinskaya
- Юлия Кучинская
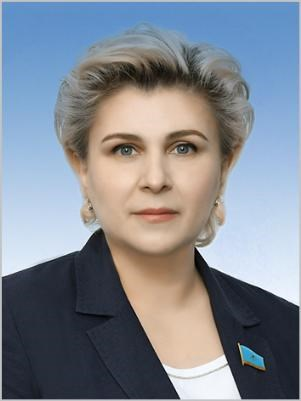
- Official Mäjılıs portrait, 2023

Member of the Kurultai
- Incumbent
- Assumed office 27 August 2026

Member of the Mäjılıs
- In office 28 March 2023 – 1 July 2026
- In office 14 January 2021 – 19 January 2023

Personal details
- Born: 3 February 1982 (age 44) Tselinograd, Kazakh SSR, Soviet Union
- Party: Ädilet (since 2026)
- Other political affiliations: Amanat
- Education: Innovative University of Eurasia

Yulia Vladimirovna Kuchinskaya (Russian: Юлия Владимировна Кучинская; born 3 February 1982) is a Kazakh politician and sociologist who has served as a member of the Kurultai from the Ädilet party list since 27 August 2026.

Kuchinskaya also served as a member of the Mäjılıs representing the Amanat party from 14 January 2021 to 30 June 2026.
