= Snezhanna Imasheva =

Kazakh politician (born 1981)

MP Snezhanna Imasheva
- Снежанна Имашева
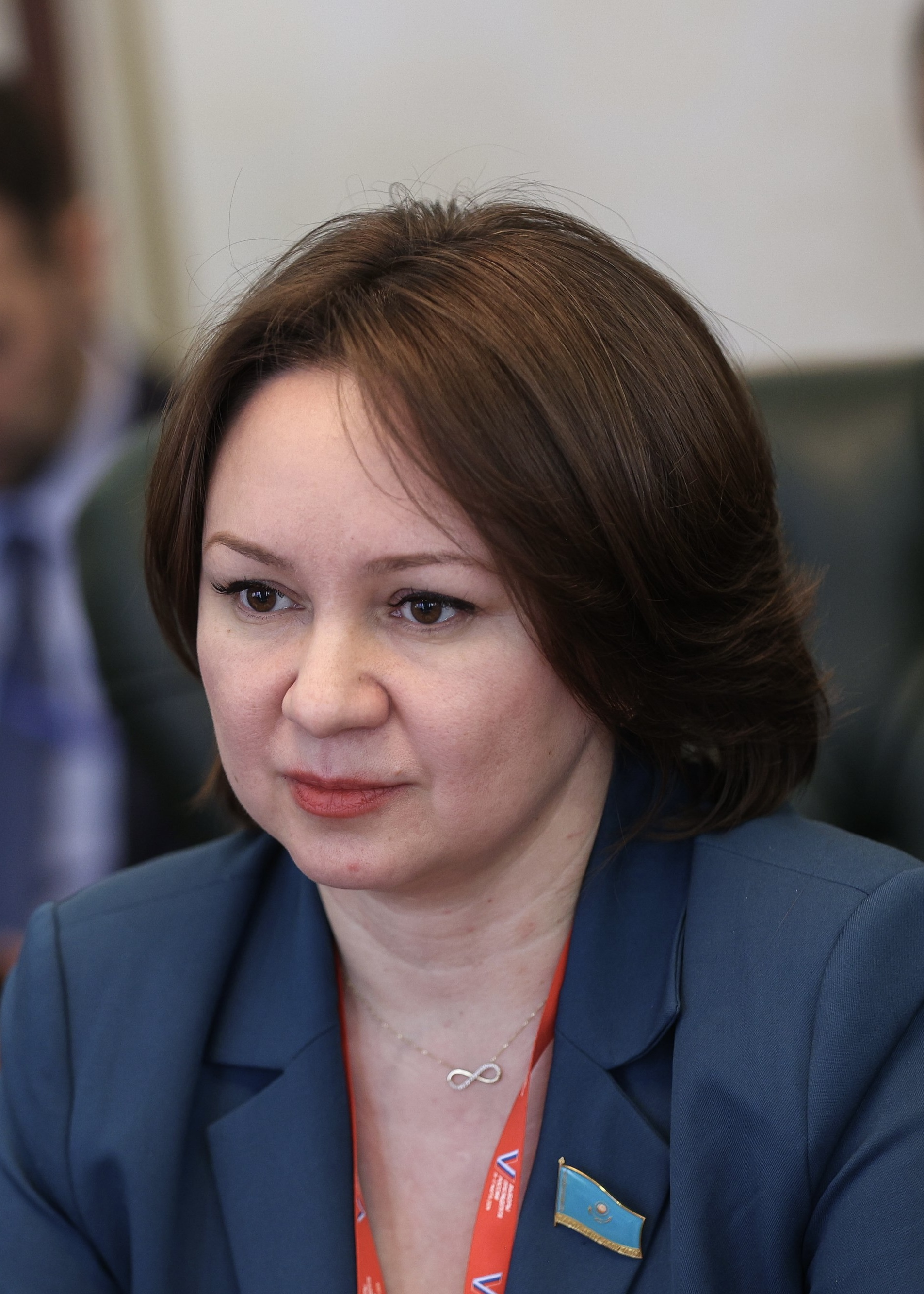
- Imasheva in 2024

Member of the Kurultai
- Incumbent
- Assumed office 27 August 2026

Member of the Mäjılıs
- In office 28 March 2023 – 1 July 2026
- In office 14 January 2021 – 19 January 2023
- In office 24 March 2016 – 14 January 2021

Personal details
- Born: 20 April 1981 (age 45) Terekti District, West Kazakhstan Region, Kazakh SSR, Soviet Union
- Party: Ädilet (since 2026)
- Other political affiliations: Amanat
- Education: West Kazakhstan State University

Snezhanna Valeryevna Imasheva (Russian: Снежанна Валерьевна Имашева; born 20 April 1981) is a Kazakh politician who has served as a Member of the Kurultai from the Ädilet party list since 27 August 2026.

Imasheva also served as a member of the Mäjılıs from 2016 to 2026.
