= Aisulu Süleimenova =

Kazakh politician

MP Aisūlu Süleimenova
- Айсұлу Сүлейменова

Member of the Kurultai
- Incumbent
- Assumed office 27 August 2026

Personal details
- Born: 26 September 1991 (age 34) Botaqara, Karaganda Region, Kazakh SSR, Soviet Union
- Party: Ädilet
- Education: Karagandy State University

Aisūlu Qanatqyzy Süleimenova (Note: Often transliterated as Aislu Kanatovna Suleymenova through a Russified Romanization of Айслу Канатовна Сулейменова.) (Kazakh: Айсұлу Қанатқызы Сүлейменова; born 26 September 1991) is a Kazakh politician and former athlete who has been serving as a member of the Kurultai from the Ädilet party list since 27 August 2026.
