= Dinara Zakieva =

Kazakh politician (born 1982)

MP Dinara Zakieva
- Динара Закиева
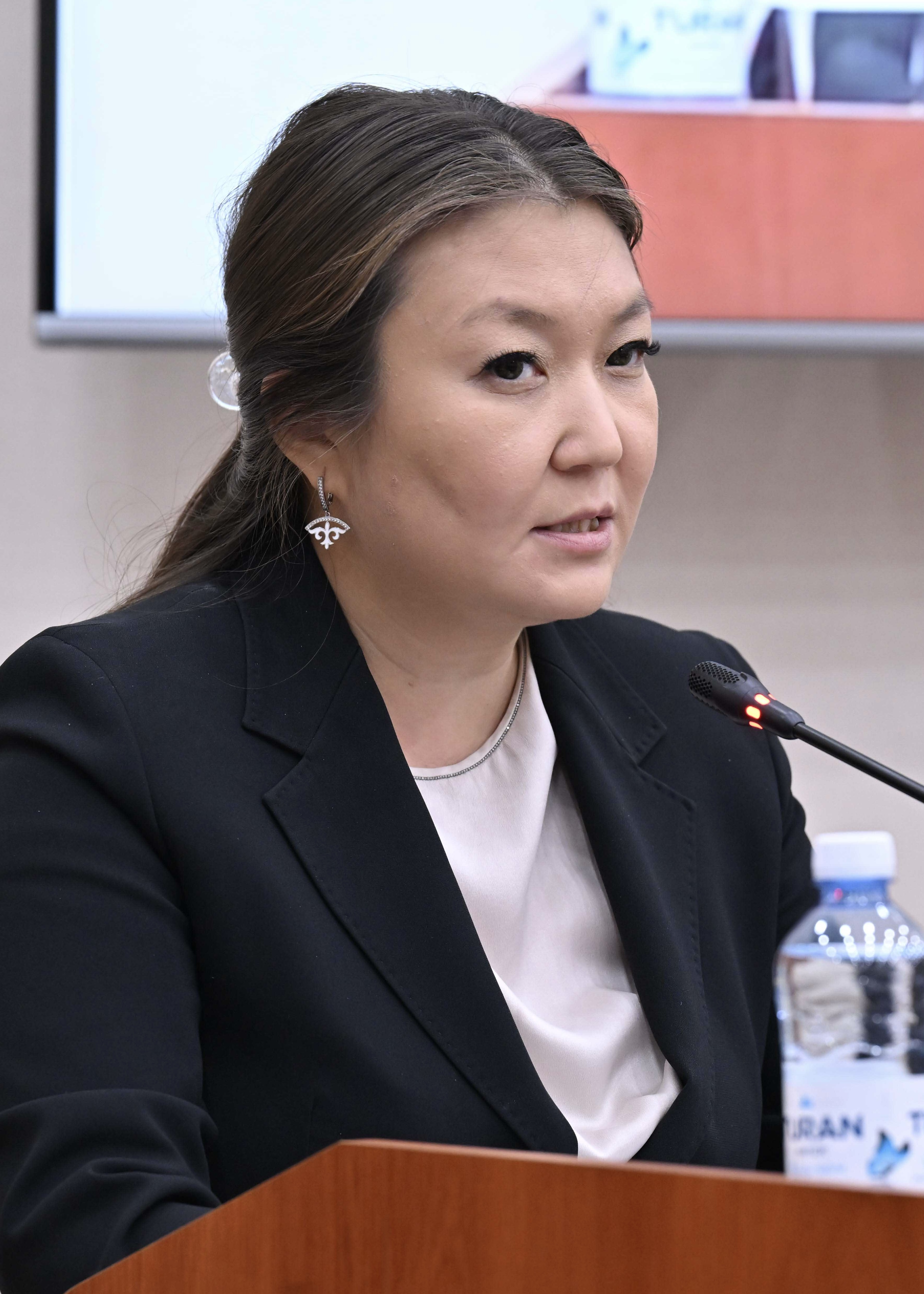
- Zakieva in 2023

Deputy Chair of the Kurultai
- Incumbent
- Assumed office 28 August 2026 Serving with Nurlan Beknazarov, Dania Espaeva
- Chair: Aibek Dädebai
- Preceded by: Office established

Member of the Kurultai
- Incumbent
- Assumed office 27 August 2026

Member of the 7th Mäjılıs
- In office 15 January 2021 – 19 January 2023

Personal details
- Born: 22 December 1982 (age 43) East Kazakhstan Region, Kazakh SSR, Soviet Union
- Party: Ädilet
- Other political affiliations: Amanat
- Spouse: Talgat Narikbaev
- Children: 4
- Education: Diplomatic Academy of the Ministry of Foreign Affairs of the Russia; Hult International Business School; Almaty State University; Beijing Language and Culture University
- Awards: Order of Kurmet

Dinara Bolatqyzy Zakieva (Kazakh: Динара Болатқызы Закиева; born 22 December 1982) is a Kazakh politician serving as a member and deputy chairwoman of the Kurultai since 2026. Previously, she was commissioner for children's rights of Kazakhstan from 2023 to 2026 and member of Mäjılıs of 7th convocation from 2021 to 2023.

== Early life and education ==
Dinara Bolatqyzy Zakieva was born on 22 December 1982, in East Kazakhstan Region, Soviet Kazakhstan.

From 1998 to 2002, Zakieva studied international law at Almaty State University. In 2001, during her studies, she spent time studying at the Beijing Language and Culture University.

In 2004, Zakieva graduated from the Diplomatic Academy of the Ministry of Foreign Affairs of the Russia in the same degree. After returning to Kazakhstan, she worked in Astana as deputy general director of TopYurAudit LLP until 2005. From February to August 2005, Zakieva served as chief specialist in the Department for Entrepreneurship Development at the Ministry of Industry and Trade.

== Early career ==
In February 2006, Zakieva founded Antarex LLP (now Antarex-2030) to launch and manage the Rafe restaurant chain in Astana.

Her biography states that from 2007 to 2013 she worked in the Presidential Administration under Nursultan Nazarbayev, first as an expert and later in an unspecified post.

== Public service ==
In 2011, during the month of Ramadan, five mothers, including Dinara Zakieva, founded the public organization Sacred Path Foundation (Kazakh: Қасиетті жол) to assist children with cerebral palsy.

In 2013, Zakieva earned am MBA from Hult International Business School in Dubai. After returning to Astana, she worked until 2015 in the Secretariat of the first deputy chairman of the Nur Otan party (now Amanat) as deputy chair, and concurrently led the party's international cooperation department.

From 2017 to 2019, she served as head of a children's home in Astana, overseeing a major renovation, the opening of an educational centre, and the institution’s reorganization into a Child Support Centre.

In 2019, the Republican Public Council on Family, Women and Children’s Rights was established under Nur Otan where Dinara Zakieva became deputy chair. She was appointed chair in 2020 and under her leadership a unified contact center (111) was launched to provide assistance to families, women, and children. From 2019 to 2021, she also headed the Care Foundation (Kazakh: Қамқорлық қоры) under the Nursultan Nazarbayev Foundation.

== Political career ==
In the wake of the 2021 legislative elections, Zakieva assumed office on 14 January, as a Mäjılıs member of the 7th convocation, representing the Nur Otan party. Following the party's historic rebranding to Amanat, her mandate expanded in April 2022 as she was reappointed to the Republican Public Council for Family and Social Protection. With the dissolution of the 7th convocation on 19 January 2023, Zakieva ran in the subsequent parliamentary elections but was not elected.

On 12 June of the same year, President Kassym-Jomart Tokayev appointed Dinara Zakieva as Kazakhstan's Commissioner for Children's Rights.

On 21 January 2026, Zakieva joined the Commission on Constitutional Reform. The commission's work resulted in the adoption of a new Constitution on 15 March of the same year, which replaced the bicameral parliament with a unicameral Kurultai.

On 15 April 2026, Dinara Zakieva was among 15 co-founders of the Adilet party. She ran as an Adilet candidate in the 23 August elections to the new unicameral Kurultai. The party received the largest share of the vote, so Zakieva was nominated as a member of 1st convocation. Her mandate as Commissioner for Children's Rights was thus terminated. On 28 August, at the Kurultai's 1st session, she was elected deputy chairwoman of Aibek Dädebai.

== Personal life ==
Dinara Zakieva is married to Talgat Narikbaev, chairman of the board of Maqsut Narikbaev University and son of former chief justice of Kazakhstan (from 1996 to 2000) Maksut Narikbaev. They have four children.
