= Tilektes Adambekov =

Kazakhstani politician

MP Tılektes Adambekov
- Тілектес Адамбеков
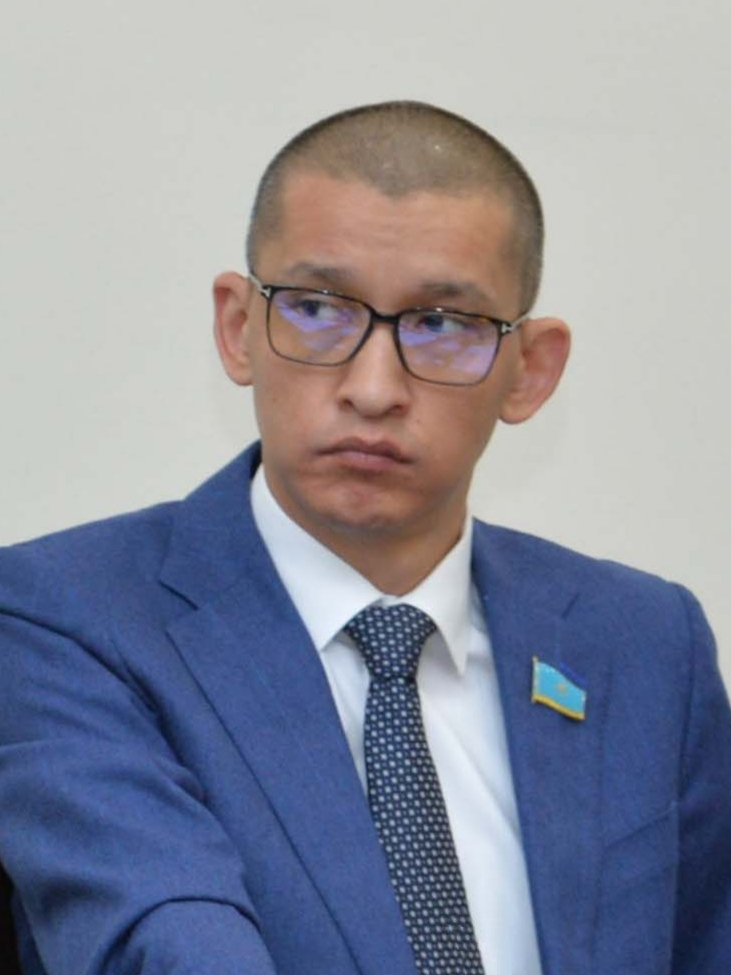
- Adambekov in 2023

Member of the Kurultai
- Incumbent
- Assumed office 27 August 2026

Member of the Mäjılıs
- In office 28 March 2023 – 1 July 2026
- In office 14 January 2021 – 19 January 2023

Personal details
- Born: 1 January 1989 (age 37) Aktogay, Karaganda Region, Kazakh SSR, Soviet Union
- Party: Ädilet (since 2026)
- Other political affiliations: Amanat
- Education: Nazarbayev University

Tılektes Serıkbaiūly Adambekov (Kazakh: Тілектес Серікбайұлы Адамбеков; born 1 January 1989) is a Kazakh politician who has served as a Member of the Kurultai from the Ädilet party list since 27 August 2026. Before, Adambekov served as member of the Mäjılıs, the lower house of the now-dissolved Parliament of Kazakhstan.
