= Gülzira Atabaeva =

Kazakhstani lawyer and politician

MP Gülzira Atabaeva
- Гүлзира Атабаева

Member of the Kurultai
- Incumbent
- Assumed office 27 August 2026

Personal details
- Born: 8 June 1994 (age 32) Pavlodar, Pavlodar Region, Kazakhstan
- Party: Ädilet
- Education: Innovative University of Eurasia

Gülzira Nūrjanqyzy Atabaeva (Note: Often transliterated as Gulzira Nurzhankyzy Atabayeva through a Russified Romanization of Гульзира Нуржанкызы Атабаева.) (Kazakh: Гүлзира Нұржанқызы Атабаева; born 8 June 1994) is a Kazakh lawyer and politician who has served as a Member of the Kurultai from the Ädilet party list since 27 August 2026.

Atabaeva is a senior member who joins in the political bureau of the ruling Ädilet political party.
