= Bachelor of Information Systems =

Bachelor's degree

Bachelor of Information Systems (also known as Bachelor of Information System) is a three or four-year higher degree, which provides basic skills in managing software services, databases, web solutions, and simple data networks. Multimedia, programming and IT security are covered in the study program. In addition, the program also includes economics, marketing and business life.

A typical job gained after graduation is IT consulting. The degree is also relevant within a wide range of IT jobs, such as IT management, design and operation of web solutions and networking, marketing and technical sales.

== Study centres in Norway ==
- University of Agder, Kristiansand
- University of South-Eastern Norway, Bø, Hønefoss
- Høgskolen i Østfold, Halden
