= People's Gratitude medal =

People’s Gratitude medal
- Awarded for: Citizens of the Republic of Kazakhstan who work fruitfully in the fields of education, healthcare, social protection, and who have particularly distinguished themselves in the fight against the Covid-19 pandemic
- Presented by: Kazakhstan
- Established: June 8, 2020

The medal "People's Gratitude" (Kazakh: Halyk alǵysy medalі) is a state award of the Republic of Kazakhstan, established in accordance with the Decree of the President of the Republic of Kazakhstan Kassym-Jomart Tokayev dated June 8, 2020.

== Regulation on the Medal ==
The People’s Gratitude (the Halyk Algysy Medal) is awarded to the civilians of the Republic of Kazakhstan for their fruitful work in the fields of education, health care, social protection and for their significant contribution to COVID-19 pandemic response.

The Medal is awarded by the President of the Republic of Kazakhstan, as well as on behalf of and by order of the President of the Republic of Kazakhstan by: the State Secretary of the Republic of Kazakhstan, Akims of provinces and Akims of the cities of Nur-Sultan, Almaty and Shymkent and other officials.

The medal is awarded publicly in a solemn atmosphere. Before the awards ceremony, a decree of the President of the Republic of Kazakhstan on awarding is announced, and every medal is accompanied with a certificate issued during the awards ceremony.

== Description ==
The People’s Gratitude Medal consists of a coin-like medallion and a suspension brooch. The round shape medallion is 32 mm in diameter and is made of goldish brass.

There is the "Birgemiz" logo on the obverse of the medal in the foreground. The upper part of the medal is decorated with a Kazakh ornamental pattern. There is an inscription Kazakh: "ХАЛЫҚ АЛҒЫСЫ" (People’s Gratitude) at the bottom. The reverse of the medal is decorated with a Kazakh ornamental pattern around the circumference. There is an inscription Kazakh: "ҚАЗАҚСТАН РЕСПУБЛИКАСЫ 2020" (the Republic of Kazakhstan 2020) in the centre. The medallion is connected to a rectangular 32 mm wide suspension brooch made of goldish brass with an eye and a suspension ring. The central part is decorated with a Kazakh ornamental pattern. The background of the suspension brooch is covered with blue enamel. All the images and inscriptions on the medal are convex. The medallion edge is rimmed. The reverse of the suspension brooch includes a pin with lock.

== Medal Recipients ==
A total of 60 doctors and 39 policemen, 30 servicemen, 41 volunteers and 34 philanthropists were awarded the medal nationwide. In addition, the medal was awarded to 38 artists and educators, as well as 25 media representatives.

== See also ==
- Orders, decorations, and medals of Kazakhstan
