= Medal for Distinguished Labor (Kazakhstan) =

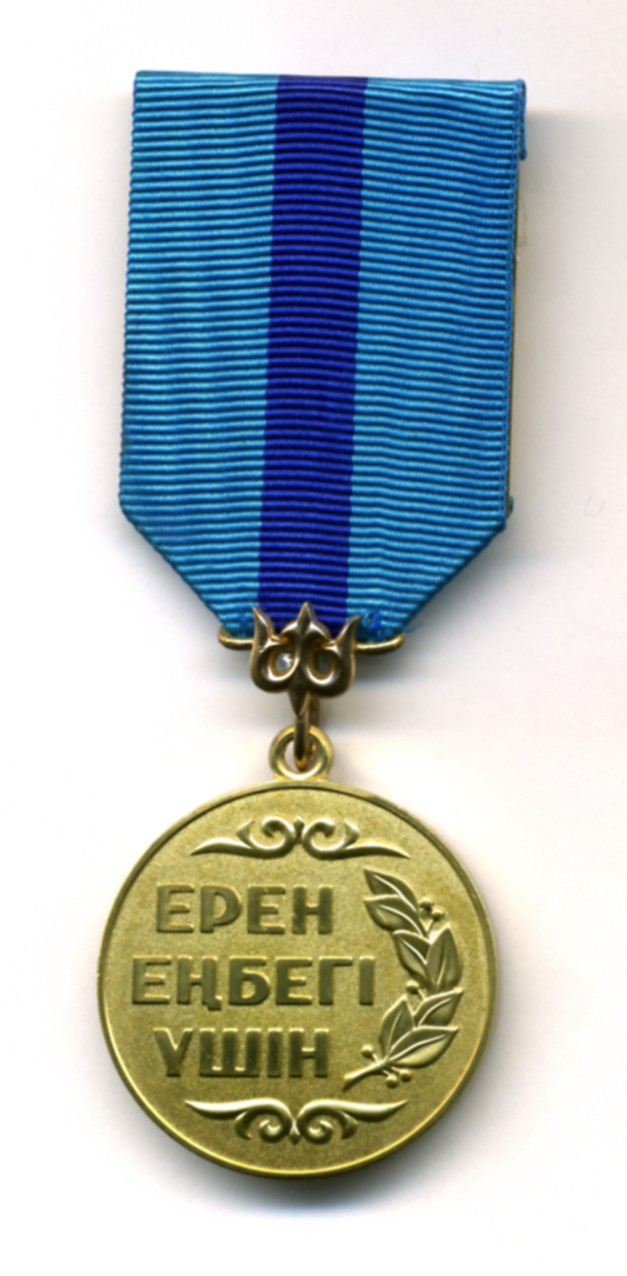
- Medal for Distinguished Labor (Kazakhstan)
- Presented by: Kazakhstan
- Status: active
- Established: December 12, 1995
- Ribbon of the Medal

Precedence
- Next (higher): Medal of Valor
- Next (lower): Medal of Charity

Medal for Distinguished Labor (Kazakh: Ерен еңбегі үшін медалі, romanized: Eren eñbegı üşın medalı) is a Kazakhstani state decoration established under the Law on State Awards of the Republic of Kazakhstan (No.2676, dd. December 12, 1995).

== Eligibility ==
Medal for Distinguished Labor (Eren eńbegi úshin medali) is conferred on individuals for achievements in the economy, science, culture, social or public service.

== Description ==
The medal is circular and ridged, made if brass.The front side is marked with - Ерен Еңбегі Үшін written in 3 lines, with an olive branch located to the left of the inscription and national Kazakh ornaments above and below the text. The medal connects to its hexagonal back board (wrapped in a silk ribbon made in the national light blue color with a dark blue stripe in the middle) with an intricate element shaped after a Kazakh ornament. The medal was struck in the Kazakhstani Mint in Ust-Kamenogorsk.

== Gallery ==
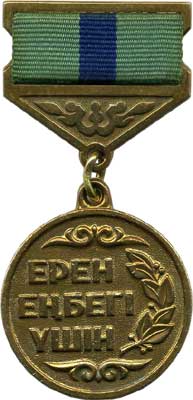
Type 1 medal

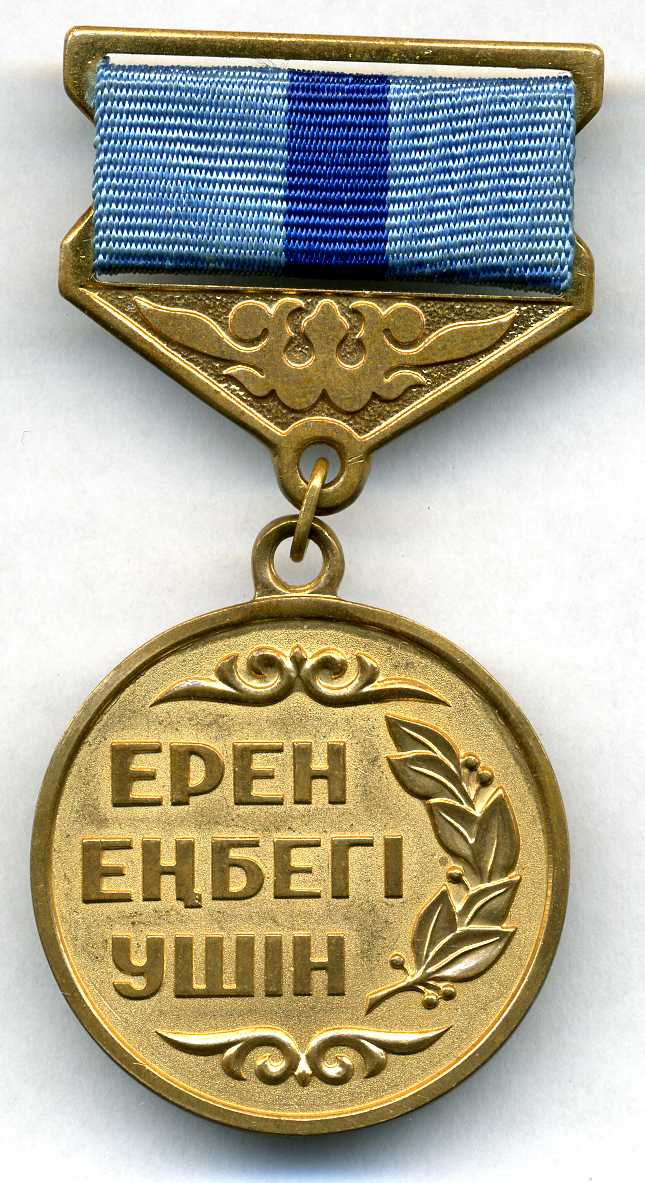
Type 1 medal with misspelled inscription.

== See also ==
- Orders, decorations, and medals of Kazakhstan
