= Constitution of Kazakhstan =

Constitution of the Republic of Kazakhstan

Overview
- Original title: Қазақстан Республикасының Конституциясы (Kazakh); Конституция Республики Казахстан (Russian)
- Jurisdiction: Kazakhstan
- Presented: 12 February 2026
- Ratified: 15 March 2026
- Date effective: 1 July 2026
- System: Unitary semi-presidential republic

Government structure
- Branches: Three
- Head of state: President
- Chambers: Unicameral Kurultai
- Executive: President and Ministers
- Judiciary: Supreme Court
- Federalism: Unitary
- Electoral college: No
- Location: Archive of the President of the Republic of Kazakhstan, Astana, Kazakhstan
- Authors: Working Group on Parliamentary Reform and Constitutional Commission
- Signatories: Constitutional referendum by the citizens of Kazakhstan
- Supersedes: 1995 Constitution of Kazakhstan

The Constitution of Kazakhstan is the highest law of Kazakhstan. It was adopted on 15 March 2026 as a result of the 2026 Kazakh constitutional referendum and entered into force on 1 July 2026. It replaced the 1995 Constitution of Kazakhstan.

President Kassym-Jomart Tokayev's 2025 State of the Nation Address, in which he announced parliamentary reforms aimed at amending the 1995 constitution, with a constitutional referendum initially planned for 2027 to implement this package of amendments. However, discussions within the working group expanded the scope of the proposed reforms—including restructuring parliament, redefining the balance of powers between state institutions, and expanding constitutional guarantees of human, digital, and environmental rights—prompting consideration of an entirely new constitution. A Constitutional Commission was subsequently established to draft the new text, and after a series of meetings and public consultations that gathered thousands of proposals from citizens and experts.

The draft constitution proposed significant institutional changes, rewriting approximately 84% of the 1995 Constitution and introducing 95 articles, including replacing the bicameral Parliament of Kazakhstan with a unicameral Kurultai, reintroducing the office of vice president, ensuring the separation of religion and state, and revising provisions related to the judiciary, civil rights, and the structure of the executive branch. Some political analysts and civil society groups argued that certain provisions could strengthen presidential authority and affect presidential succession. The draft also constitutionally codified the prohibition of same-sex marriage in Kazakhstan by defining marriage as a union between a man and a woman.

== Background ==
Following Kazakhstan's independence in 1991, the Constitution of Kazakhstan has undergone several revisions and replacements through referendums and legislative amendments. The 1995 constitutional referendum replaced the 1993 constitution, establishing a strong semi-presidential system and a bicameral parliament consisting of the Mäjilis and the Senate. The bicameral Parliament of Kazakhstan was controversial, as the unitary state had no precedent for two chambers, it failed to improve representation or legislative quality, and the rise of Amanat's ruling party dominance weakened the Senate, which political scientist Sultanbek Sultangaliev described as the upper house as a "Chamber of Honorary Pensioners" duplicating the Mäjilis' functions, prompting democratic opposition-led calls since the late 1990s and early 2000s to return to a unicameral system.

In the years that followed, further amendments were introduced to the 1995 constitution, gradually adjusting the balance of power between the presidency, parliament, and other state institutions. In June 2022, a nationwide referendum supported by 77% of voters approved a major package of amendments to the 1995 Constitution. The reforms reduced the powers of the presidency, strengthened Parliament, abolished the privileged constitutional status of the Elbasy (Leader of the Nation), and reinforced provisions on human rights and institutional accountability. Officials presented the referendum as laying the foundations of a "New Kazakhstan" in the aftermath of the January Events. A separate package of amendments was adopted by Parliament in September 2022, introducing a new restriction on the presidency: a single, non-renewable seven-year term. The same measure also restored the capital's name from Nur-Sultan to Astana.

Following President Kassym-Jomart Tokayev's political reset that concluded with the 2023 legislative election, some Kazakh and independent media speculated that the authorities might once again consider constitutional reforms, either to extend presidential powers or restructure state institutions. In January 2024, President Tokayev dismissed these rumours in an interview with Egemen Qazaqstan, asserting that the seven-year presidential term "will never change again" and that no further changes to the Constitution were planned for the near future.

On the eve of the 30th anniversary of the 1995 Constitution of Kazakhstan, debate over the document's future arose as Kazakh online media reported an independently drafted third constitution by legal scholar Jumageldy Eliubaev, proposing changes to the structure of government, parliamentary powers, presidential terms, and state symbolism. According to Orda.kz, Eliubaev's draft—published on the legal information platform "PARAGRAF" before later being shortly removed—allegedly attracted interest within the presidential administration amidst lingering uncertainty over the direction of Kazakhstan's constitutional future. However, during the address, President Tokayev noted that while proposals for a new constitution had been discussed, reforms over the years, including changes after the 2022 referendum, had modernized the Basic Law and preserved its core principles, ruling out calls for a complete replacement.

Nevertheless, on 8 September 2025, President Tokayev, at the State of the Nation Address, proposed holding a referendum on parliamentary reforms, noting that the proposals should be thoroughly discussed over the coming year, with a referendum possibly taking place in 2027.

== Drafting ==
On 8 October 2025, President Tokayev signed a decree establishing a 33-member Working Group on Parliamentary Reform, led by State Counsellor Erlan Qarin. The group includes parliamentary deputies from the Mäjilis and the Senate, members of the Assembly of People of Kazakhstan, leaders of parliamentary party factions, as well as heads of scientific institutes, prominent scholars specializing in constitutional law and the theory of state and law, and experts and members of the National Kurultai.

Between October 2025 and January 2026, the working group held a total of six meetings, during which seven political parties and 16 public organizations submitted proposals for constitutional reform, and discussions focused on the composition of the future parliament, its term of office, number of deputies, quotas, electoral procedures, interaction with other branches of power, the main directions of the legislative process, and the parliament's powers in ensuring the functioning of state bodies.

During the 5th meeting of the National Kurultai, Tokayev assessed that the anticipated number of amendments would be "much greater" and described the process as a step toward adopting a new Constitution.

On 21 January 2026, Tokayev signed a decree establishing the Constitutional Commission, composed of over 120 members, including National Kurultai representatives, prominent lawyers, media leaders, local assembly (mäslihat) chairpersons, regional public council members, and other professionals, and headed by Constitutional Court chairwoman Elvira Äzimova.

On 31 January, after six meetings, the Constitutional Commission reported to Tokayev that planned amendments affecting about 84% of the 1995 constitution had led it to conclude that a completely new Constitution should be drafted, proposed publishing the first full draft for public discussion. Mäjilis deputy Snejanna Imasheva noted that this approach complies with Paragraph 9 of Article 26 of the Law "On Legal Acts", which requires adoption of a new edition if more than half of a legal act is amended. The first draft of the new Constitution was published the same day. For the first time, the draft constitution's preamble defines human rights and freedoms as the Kazakh state's top priority, including the right to life, personal inviolability, data protection, and a Miranda rule.

Throughout early February, the Constitutional Commission continued to hold meetings to refine the draft constitution, incorporating public and expert feedback. Among the revisions were adjustments to the wording of the provision on the status of the Russian language in state institutions, clarification of constitutional guarantees concerning free education and universal health care, proposals to strengthen protections of private property and housing rights, and discussions on institutional mechanisms such as the grounds and procedure for the dissolution of Parliament.

== Implementation ==
On 17 March 2026, Tokayev took part in a ceremonial event at the Akorda Residence marking the adoption of the new constitution. During the event, attended by senior government officials and members of the Constitutional Commission, Central Referendum Commission chairman Nurlan Äbdirov announced the final results of the referendum. Tokayev signed the new constitution into law, calling it a "strategic document" and "symbol of national unity" that reflects citizens' hopes, announced measures for its implementation including amnesty for certain offenses, and declared that it will take effect on 1 July 2026 with 15 March to be observed annually as Constitution Day. Later that same day, Tokayev chaired a working meeting to oversee implementation of the new constitution and instructed the government and parliament to harmonize existing laws and adopt the necessary constitutional and legislative amendments ahead of the constitution taking effect.

On 20 March 2026, the Parliament of Kazakhstan held its first joint session following the referendum and began legislative codification of the new constitutional framework, during which deputies approved in the first reading a draft law establishing the special status of the new city of Alatau. The outgoing 8th convocation of the Parliament of Kazakhstan is expected to complete adoption of these implementation laws before the constitution takes effect, after which the legislature will be dissolved as part of the transition to the new institutional structure centered on the Kurultai, with elections scheduled prior to the opening session of the first Kurultai on 1 September 2026.

On 7 July 2026, following a request submitted by Tokayev, the Constitutional Court of Kazakhstan issued a normative resolution interpreting the new constitution's transitional provisions, ruling that terms of office held under the 1995 constitution would not count toward restrictions established by the 2026 constitutional order, allowing Tokayev to potentially seek another seven-year term in 2029.

== Main provisions ==
On 11 February 2026, at its 12th meeting, the Constitutional Commission declared that the draft of the new Constitution was ready for a nationwide referendum. That same day, the commission submitted its final draft of the new Constitution to President Tokayev, who praised the commission's work, highlighted the draft's role in modernizing institutional foundations and supporting sustainable development, noted the high level of public discussion and participation, announcing that he would sign a decree to hold a republican referendum on its adoption in "near future".

The final draft, published on 12 February 2026, comprised a preamble and 95 articles across 11 sections, addressing the foundations of Kazakhstan's constitutional order, human rights, state institutions, and procedures for constitutional amendments. Among the notable provisions:

- Foundations of the constitutional order: The draft affirms Kazakhstan as a democratic, secular, unitary state, emphasizes the rule of law, and guarantees the sovereignty and territorial integrity of the country. It defines state symbols and establishes Kazakh as the state language, while Russian is recognized for official use.
- Human rights and freedoms: Individual rights are prioritized throughout the document. The draft explicitly abolishes the death penalty, protects privacy and digital rights, guarantees family and personal freedoms, and affirms freedom of conscience and religion.
- Structure of government: A unicameral parliament (Kurultai) with 145 deputies elected under a proportional system is established. The draft also introduces a vice president and a People's Council to serve as a national dialogue platform.
- Judiciary and legal oversight: Judicial independence is reinforced, with provisions for the Constitutional Court and courts of general jurisdiction.
- Local self-government: Municipalities and regions are granted autonomy, with clearly defined powers and responsibilities.
- Electoral and referendum provisions: Citizens' rights to participate in governance through free elections and referendum are codified, alongside procedures for amending the Constitution.
- Social and cultural rights: Gender equality, the protection of traditional family values, secular education, and the promotion of culture, science, and innovation are highlighted.
- Environmental and sustainable development principles: The state's responsibility for natural resources and ecological protection is recognized, alongside commitments to sustainable development.

According to the Constitutional Commission, the final text incorporated editorial and substantive revisions based on approximately 10,000 proposals received during the public consultation process.
