= Kurultai (Kazakhstan) =

Unicameral parliament of Kazakhstan

Kuryltai of the Republic of Kazakhstan: Қазақстан Республикасының Құрылтайы (Kazakh); Курултай Республики Казахстан (Russian)
- 1st Kurultai
- Coat of arms of Kazakhstan

Type
- Type: Unicameral
- Term limits: 5 years

History
- Established: 1 July 2026; 3 months ago
- Preceded by: Parliament of Kazakhstan

Leadership
- Chairperson: Aibek Dädebai, Ädilet since 28 August 2026
- Deputy Chairpeople: Nurlan Beknazarov, Ädilet since 28 August 2026
- Dania Espaeva, Aq Jol since 28 August 2026
- Dinara Zakieva, Ädilet since 28 August 2026

Structure
- Seats: 145
- Political groups: Government (110): Ädilet (110); Others (35): Auyl (10); Respublica (9); Aq Jol (8); JSDP (8)

Elections
- Voting system: Closed list party-list proportional representation with a 5% electoral threshold
- Last election: 23 August 2026
- Next election: No later than June 2031

Meeting place
- Astana, Kazakhstan

Website
- https://quryltai.kz

The Kurultai, (Note: Kazakh: Құрылтай, romanized: Qūryltai, lit. 'Assembly' IPA: [qo̙rɯɫˈtʰɑj] Russian: Курултай, romanized: Kurultai IPA: [kʊrʊɫˈtaj]) officially known in English as the Kuryltai of the Republic of Kazakhstan, (Note: Kazakh: Қазақстан Республикасының Құрылтайы; Qazaqstan Respublikasynyñ Qūryltaiy; IPA: [qɑzɑɣ(ɯ)sˈtʰɑn rʲɪˈspublʲɪkäˈsɯˈnɯŋ qo̙rɯɫtʰɑˈjɯ]; Russian: Курултай Республики Казахстан; Kurultai Respubliki Kazakhstan; IPA: [kʊrʊɫˈtaj rʲɪˈspublʲɪkʲɪ kɐzɐxˈstan]) is the unicameral legislature of Kazakhstan, established in June 2026 following constitutional reforms that replaced the previous bicameral Parliament of Kazakhstan, consisting of the Mäjilis and the Senate. The body serves as the sole legislative authority of the state, responsible for adopting laws, approving the state budget, and exercising oversight of the executive branch.

The Kurultai consists of 145 members, all of whom are elected under a proportional system. The current, 1st convocation, was elected following the 2026 Kazakh legislative election.

== History ==
=== Background ===
The term kurultai originates from Turkic and Mongolic languages, derived from the verbal root qur- or quri- meaning "to gather" or "to assemble" The suffix -tai or -tay denotes a collective or formal gathering, giving the term the meaning of a "great assembly" or "national council". Historically, kurultai referred to councils of political and military leaders convened in nomadic and semi-nomadic societies of the Eurasian steppe, including those in the territory of present-day Kazakhstan.

In steppe political tradition, assemblies identified as kurultai were associated with large-scale decision-making among ruling elites. Such gatherings are often linked in historical sources to the Mongol imperial period, when they were used for matters such as the proclamation of rulers and coordination of military campaigns. Similar forms of council-based decision-making also existed in later Turkic polities, including the Kazakh Khanate (15th–18th centuries), where khans, sultans, and biys, and clan elders convened to address matters of war, peace, customary law, and inter-tribal relations. In Kazakh history, such assemblies were convened periodically during major political or military crises, including coordination efforts against external threats in the 18th century. These councils functioned as consultative and consensus-based institutions rather than permanent legislatures.

Following incorporation into the Russian Empire in the 19th century and subsequent Soviet administration in the 20th century, traditional steppe governance structures ceased to operate as formal political institutions. In the early 20th century, national congresses associated with the Alash national liberation movement briefly revived the idea of collective assemblies in a modern political context, but these were replaced by Soviet administrative systems.

After Kazakhstan gained independence in 1991, the country adopted a new constitutional framework in 1995 establishing a bicameral Parliament of Kazakhstan consisting of the Senate and the Mäjilis. This system functioned as the national legislature until its dissolution in 2026.

=== Establishing ===
In 2026, following a constitutional reform approved by national referendum, Kazakhstan restructured its legislative branch into a unicameral parliament named the Kurultai. The reform abolished the previous bicameral parliament and established the Kurultai as the sole legislative body of the Republic of Kazakhstan, adopting a historical term to designate the new institution. The Constitutional Law "On the Kurultai of the Republic of Kazakhstan and the Status of Its Deputies" was subsequently ratified by Parliament and signed into law by President Kassym-Jomart Tokayev on 5 June 2026. The law established the structure, powers, electoral system, and status of deputies of the new legislature and entered into force on 1 July 2026, simultaneously with the new constitution, formally establishing the Kurultai as Kazakhstan's national legislature.

== Electoral system ==
The Kurultai consists of 145 deputies elected on the basis of a proportional representation system within the territory of a single nationwide electoral district. A citizen of Kazakhstan who has reached the age of 25 and has resided in the country for the past 10 years may be elected as a deputy chairman of the Kurultai. The term of office of deputies of the Kurultai is 5 years.

== Leadership ==
=== Chairman ===
The Kurultai is headed by the Chairman. He is elected by secret ballot from among the deputies who are fluent in the Kazakh language by a majority vote of the total number of Kurultai deputies. The President of Kazakhstan nominates the Chairman; if the Kurultai refuses to elect the Chairman twice, the President has the right to dissolve the Kurultai.

=== Deputy Chairman ===
The deputy chairmen are elected by the deputies of the Kurultai, and their candidacies are proposed by the chairmen themselves.
