= 1st Kurultai =

1st convocation of the Kazakh Kurultai

Kurultai of Kazakhstan of the 1st convocation
←	8th Parliament of Kazakhstan

Overview
- Legislative body: Kurultai
- Meeting place: Parliament Building; Astana, Kazakhstan
- Term: 28 August 2026 –
- Election: 23 August 2026
- Government: Bektenov I; Bektenov II
- Members: 145 members
- Chairman: Aibek Dädebai (Ädilet)
- Deputy Chairmen: Nurlan Beknazarov (Ädilet); Dania Espaeva (Aq Jol); Dinara Zakieva (Ädilet)
- Party control: Ädilet (110)

The Kurultai of the Republic of Kazakhstan of the 1st convocation (Note: Kazakh: Бірінші шақырылған Қазақстан Республикасының Құрылтайы; Bırınşı şaqyrylğan Qazaqstan Respublikasynyñ Parlamentı; IPA: [bɘ.rɘnˈʂɘ ʂɑqɯrɯɫˈɣɑn qɑzɑɣ(ɯ)sˈtʰɑn rʲɪˈspublʲɪkäsɯˈnɯŋ qo̙rɯɫtʰɑˈjɯ]; Russian: Курултай Республики Казахстан первого созыва; Kurultai Respubliki Kazakhstan pervogo sozyva; IPA: [kʊrʊɫˈtaj rʲɪˈspublʲɪkʲɪ kɐzɐxˈstan ˈpʲervəvə sɐˈzɨvə]) is the first convocation of the Kurultai of Kazakhstan that was elected following the 2026 Kazakh legislative election.

== Background ==
Following the 2026 Kazakh constitutional referendum, the country adopted a new Constitution, which created a new unicameral legislature, the Kurultai, in place of the bicameral Parliament of Kazakhstan. Other political and legislative reforms occurred alongside this change, like the re-instatement of the office of Vice President.

== Election ==
Kazakhstan held a legislative election on 23 August 2026 to elect all the 145 members to the newly created unicameral Kurultai. It was the 10th legislative election since Kazakhstan's independence in 1991 and first since the entry into force of the 2026 Constitution of Kazakhstan. Historically, there were many doubts in the freedom and fairness of the elections in Kazakhstan by differing observing international organizations.

As a result of the legislative election, 5 parties have overcome the 5% electoral threshold. The Ädilet political party received the absolute majority, securing 110 seats out of 145.

== Sessions ==
The 1st Kurultai first convened on 27 August 2026.

== Members ==
Following its election, the 1st Kurultai encompassed members of five political parties. They were assigned seats as following:

Party	Seats
Ädilet	110
Auyl	10
Respublica	9
Aq Jol	8
Nationwide Social Democratic Party	8
