= Central Election Commission (Kazakhstan) =

Kazakh state body

Central Election Commission of the Republic of Kazakhstan
- Қазақстан Республикасының Орталық сайлау комиссиясы Qazaqstan Respublikasynyñ Ortalyq sailau komissiasy

- Central Election Commission building

Agency overview
- Formed: 22 September 1989; 36 years ago
- Jurisdiction: Government of Kazakhstan
- Headquarters: Astana, Kazakhstan
- Chairman responsible: Nurlan Äbdirov
- Website: election.gov.kz

The Central Election Commission of the Republic of Kazakhstan (CEC RK or CEC, Kazakh: Қазақстан Республикасының Орталық сайлау комиссиясы, romanized: Qazaqstan Respublikasynyñ Ortalyq sailau komissiasy, ҚР OSK; Russian: Центральная избирательная комиссия Республики Казахстан, romanized: Tsentralnaya izbiratelnaya komissiya Respubliki Kazakhstan, ЦИК РК) is a state body in Kazakhstan, which heads the unified system of election commissions.

== History ==
The OSK was originally formed on 22 September 1989 as the Central Election Commission for Elections and Recall of People's Deputies of the Kazakh SSR by the Resolution of the Supreme Soviet of the Kazakh SSR. It was consisted of 25 people.

By the Decree of the President of Kazakhstan of No. 3205, the current Regulation on the Central Election Commission of the Republic of Kazakhstan was approved on 11 November 1996.

In 2013, the OSK became a member of the Association of World Election Bodies.

== Functions ==
In accordance with Article 12 of the Constitutional Law of the Republic of Kazakhstan from 28 September 1995 "On elections in the Republic of Kazakhstan", the OSK exercises control over the implementation of the legislation on elections in Kazakhstan; organizes the preparation and conduct of elections of the president of the Republic of Kazakhstan and members of the Mazhilis; directs the organization and conduct of elections of members of the Senate of Kazakhstan; considers the issue of admitting political parties to participate in the Mazhilis and Maslihats elections, elected by party lists; carries out management of election commissions for the election of the president and members of the Parliament; sums up the results of the elections of the president and members of the Parliament, registers the elected president and members of the Parliament, publishes a message about this in the mass media; exercises other powers in accordance with the legislation of Kazakhstan.

== Composition ==
The Central Election Commission consists of seven people: the chairman and six members of the commission.

From 1995 to 2006, the election and dismissal of the chairman, deputy chairman, secretary and members of the OSK was carried out by the Mazhilis on the proposal of the president of Kazakhstan.

As a result of the constitutional reform of 2007, a different procedure for the formation of the OSK was determined, providing for the joint participation of the president and both chambers of the Parliament of Kazakhstan. The OSK is currently composed of:

- The chairman and two members which are appointed by the president of Kazakhstan;
- Two members that are appointed by the Senate of Kazakhstan;
- Two members that are appointed by the Mazhilis;

The term of office of the chairman and the six members of the commission is five years.

== Apparatus ==
The organizational, informational and legal support of the OSK is carried out by its apparatus. The head of the OSK administration is appointed and dismissed by the chairman.
