= Ädilet (political party) =

Kazakh political party

Justice Ädilet Әділет
- Chairman: Aibek Dädebai
- Kurultai faction leader: Erbol Adaev
- Founders: Aibek Dädebai; Rauan Kenzhekhanuly; Bağdat Musin; Dinara Zakieva; Zamira Kuzieva; Qarlygaş Jamanqulova; and others
- Founded: 7 May 2026
- Registered: 1 June 2026
- Preceded by: Amanat
- Youth wing: Jastar Ruhy
- Membership (2026): >800,000
- Ideology: Pro-Tokayev; Technocracy; Neoliberalism; Secularism
- Political position: Big tent
- Colours: Purple
- Slogan: «Our strength is in unity, our foundation is in justice» (Kazakh: «Күшіміз – бірлікте, негізіміз – әділетте»)
- Kurultai: 110 / 145

Website
- adilet-partiyasy.kz

Ädilet (Kazakh: Әділет, romanized: Ädılet, lit. 'Justice', stylized as Әdilet) is the ruling political party of Kazakhstan. Founded on 7 May 2026, it describes itself as a reformist centrist party supporting the political reforms of President Kassym-Jomart Tokayev and the principles of "Just Kazakhstan". Its chairman is Aibek Dädebai, who has led the party since its foundation.

Ädilet was established by an initiative group of political activists, public figures, business representatives, and members of the Constitutional Commission that drafted Kazakhstan's new constitution. The party was formally registered by the Ministry of Justice on 1 June 2026. On 14 June, the former ruling party Amanat merged into Ädilet following decisions by the two parties' congresses. The merger expanded Ädilet's organisational structure and brought Amanat's youth wing, Jastar Ruhy, into the party.

The party contested the 2026 Kazakh legislative election, the first election for the newly established unicameral Kurultai where it campaigned on political and institutional reform, regional development, economic development, digitalisation, employment, housing, and social policy. The party won 71.17% of the vote and 110 of the 145 seats in the 1st Kurultai, making it the largest party in the legislature.

== History ==
=== Formation ===
On 15 April 2026, an initiative group announced its intention to establish a new political party, Ädilet. The group consisted of political activists, public figures, business representatives, and several members of the Constitutional Commission that had drafted Kazakhstan's new constitution, including Gulzira Atabaeva, Renat Bekturov, Karlygash Zhamankulova, Dinara Zakieva, Rauan Kenzhekhanuly, Laura Karabasova, Andrei Lavrentyev, Nurbek Matzhani, Marat Shibutov, Lyazzat Shyngysbaeva, and others. The organizers presented the party as a political force committed to the principles of "Just Kazakhstan" and the implementation of the new constitution, describing its creation as a means of translating the constitutional reforms into practical policy.

On 16 April, the organizing committee announced that it had received confirmation from the Ministry of Justice acknowledging receipt of its notification of intent to establish a political party. Several members of the initiative group stated that the idea for the party had emerged during discussions within the Constitutional Commission and gained momentum following the approval of the new constitution in the March 2026 referendum.

On 7 May 2026, the founding congress of Adilet was held in Astana, at which former head of the presidential administration Aybek Dädebay was elected chairman of the party. 931 delegates from each region took part in the congress. The party's political council included 40 people: in addition to Dadebay, the head of Kazakhtelecom Bağdat Musin, the Commissioner for Children's Rights Dinara Zakieva, businessman Andrei Lavrentyev, the head of the Adil Soz International Foundation Karlygash Zhamankulova, President Kassym-Jomart Tokayev's niece Dana Medeuova, political scientist Marat Shibutov, public figure Rauan Kenzhekhanuly, head of the Astana Financial Center Renat Bekturov and other public figures and businessmen.

In addition, a bureau of the political council of 13 people was elected. In his address to the congress, Dädebay stated that the party supported Tokayev's reform agenda and described the rule of law and discipline as its guiding principles. He outlined priorities including institutional effectiveness, regional development, economic competitiveness, social solidarity, digitalization, environmental protection, and the development of education, healthcare, science, and culture. The party declared justice, responsibility, patriotism, diligence, and development as its core values and emphasized public accountability through regular reporting on the implementation of its commitments.

On 1 June 2026, the Ministry of Justice registered the Adilet party.

=== Amanat merger ===
Following the registration of Ädilet, members of Amanat's political council publicly expressed support for the consolidation of pro-presidential political forces. The merger was formally approved by 26th Amanat Extraordinary Congress on 12 June and unanimously ratified by delegates at the 2nd Ädilet Congress on 14 June.

At the 2nd Congress, Dädebay described the merger as a decision based on "national responsibility" that transcended narrow party interests, stating that the two parties shared common goals and that Amanat's organizational experience would contribute to Ädilet's development. Following the merger, Rauan Kenzhehanuly stated that consultations regarding a possible unification between the two parties had taken place prior to their respective congresses.

After the merger, the youth wing of the Amanat party, Jastar Ruhy, moved under the Ädilet party.

=== 2026 legislative elections ===
On 10 July 2026, the 3rd Ädilet Extraordinary Congress took place in Astana, where delegates approved the party's election programme, amended the party charter, and nominated 186 candidates for the 2026 legislative elections to the newly established unicameral Kurultai of the 1st convocation. Chairman Aibek Dädebai described the election programme as a five-year plan focused on improving citizens' quality of life and strengthening cooperation between the state and society. The platform included proposals on political reform, local self-government, judicial reform, economic development, digitalization, artificial intelligence, housing, and social policy.

During the campaign, Ädilet emphasized digital transformation, regional development, support for domestic production, job creation, and expanding housing opportunities for young families. The party's candidate list included party members, public figures, business representatives, and former members of Amanat, including several former Mäjilis deputies.

Ädilet won the election with 71.2% of the vote, securing 110 of the 145 seats in the 1st Kurultai and becoming the largest party in the new legislature.

== Leadership ==
The party's governing bodies include the congress, the Political Council that operates between congresses, and the Bureau of the Political Council that operates between meetings of the Political Council. The party chairman is the top leader in the party, and this position has been held by Aybek Dädebay since the party's foundation on 7 May 2026. The bureau of the party's political council, elected in 2026, consists of 13 people.

#	Chairman	Birth–Death	Term start	Term end	Tenure
1	Aybek Dädebay	born 1980	7 May 2026	Incumbent	6 months

== Election results ==
=== Kurultai ===
Election	Party leader	Votes	%	Place	Seats	+/–	Status
2026	Aibek Dädebai	6,528,948	71.17	1st	110 / 145	New	Supermajority government

== Congresses ==
Congress	Date	Place	Contents
1st	7 May 2026	Astana	Aibek Dadebay was unanimously elected chairman of the party. The composition of the party's political council was approved.
2nd	14 June 2026	Astana	The ruling Amanat party (800,000 members) merged into the party. A decision was made to establish regional branches of the party in all regions.
3rd	10 July 2026	Astana	Extraordinary Third Party Congress. The Congress approved the party's electoral platform and endorsed the party list of candidates for the elections to the Kurultai.

== Regional branches ==
The party maintains a nationwide network of regional organisations established on a territorial basis. The creation of regional branches and the Party Branch Statute was approved at the party's 2nd Congress in June 2026, completing the formation of its organisational structure. Regional branches operate as part of a unified party system and are responsible for implementing party activities at the local level and maintaining engagement with citizens.

== Ideology ==
Ädilet describes itself as a reformist centrist party and rejects the traditional left–right political spectrum system. Its programme emphasizes what it calls "sound thinking" and "intellectual flexibility", arguing that political decision-making should combine different approaches according to their practical usefulness rather than adhere to a fixed ideological doctrine. The party presents itself as a political force of a younger generation formed during the period of Kazakhstan's independence and emphasizes professional competence, responsibility, and practical results in government.

Ädilet supports President Kassym-Jomart Tokayev's reform agenda and describes itself as a political support for his strategic course. Its programme links the party's political identity to the principles of "Just Kazakhstan" and the constitutional reforms approved in the 2026 constitutional referendum.

=== Rule of law and governance ===
The party identifies the rule of law and public order as the foundation of a just state. It advocates strengthening the effectiveness of state institutions and argues that the stability of the political system should depend on the quality of institutions rather than on individual political figures. Ädilet also supports the development of a "listening state", emphasizing greater responsiveness of government institutions to citizens and stronger accountability for public officials.

The party places particular emphasis on responsibility, competence and measurable results in public administration. Its programme criticizes bureaucratic formalism, avoidance of responsibility, nepotism, clan-based politics, hidden lobbying, populism and the imitation of government activity without substantive results.

=== Socio-economic policies ===
Ädilet advocates a competitive economy based on private property protection, entrepreneurship and fair competition. Its programme opposes monopolies, protectionism, opaque public spending and excessive dependence on a resource-based economic model, while emphasizing higher labour productivity and economic diversification.

In social policy, the party emphasizes social solidarity and targeted support, presenting social policy as a means of improving living opportunities and human dignity rather than simply distributing benefits. It supports policies concerning families, children, older people and people with special needs, while emphasizing individual responsibility and the value of work.

=== Human development and digitalisation ===
The party identifies human potential as a major source of national development, emphasizing education, healthcare, professional skills, science and the ability of citizens to adapt to changing economic and technological conditions. It supports digitalisation and the development of a "digital state", viewing technology as an instrument for improving public administration and promoting economic and social development.

Ädilet also supports environmental initiatives associated with the Taza Qazaqstan ("Clean Kazakhstan") programme, linking environmental responsibility with broader social and civic values.

=== National identity ===
Ädilet identifies justice, patriotism, responsibility, hard work and progress as its five principal values. It presents patriotism primarily as civic commitment to Kazakhstan and its future, while emphasizing the preservation of national identity alongside modernization and technological development. The party also emphasizes interethnic and interfaith harmony, national culture and civic identity as elements of the country's development.

In foreign policy, the party describes Kazakhstan as a "responsible middle power" and presents its external policy as an extension of its domestic principles and national interests. Its programme emphasizes Kazakhstan's sovereignty, international responsibility and ability to respond to geopolitical and global challenges.

=== Political alignment ===
Political scientist Andrei Chebotarev has suggested that Ädilet could occupy a centre-left niche while remaining aligned with Kazakhstan's broader political course. He associated the party's emphasis on patriotism, progress and social responsibility with themes promoted during the 2026 constitutional reform process.

Other commentators have characterized Ädilet as a technocratic and reform-oriented political force and have noted its attempt to establish a more modern political identity than Amanat. At the same time, some observers have questioned whether the merger of Amanat into Ädilet represented a substantive ideological transformation or primarily a reorganisation of the existing pro-presidential political infrastructure.
