= Member of the Kurultai =

Member of the Kurultai (national parliament of Kazakhstan)

- Members of the Kurultai in October 2026

Occupation
- Names: Құрылтай депутаты (Kazakh); депутат Курултая (Russian)
- Activity sectors: Government

Description
- Competencies: Legislation

A member of the Kurultai (Note: Kazakh: Құрылтай депутаты; Qūryltai deputaty; IPA: [qo̙rɯɫˈtʰɑj dʲɪpʊtaˈtɯ]; Russian: депутат Курултая; deputat Kurultaya; IPA: [dʲɪpʊˈtat kʊrʊɫˈtaja]) is a member of parliament and legislator elected by party lists to the Kurultai, the parliament of Kazakhstan. They are often referred to simply as "deputies".

Prior to the 2026 Kazakh constitutional referendum, the country had a bicameral legislature, the Parliament of Kazakhstan, consisting of the Senate and the Mäjilis.

Statutes concerning elections and the rights and duties of deputies are outlined in the Constitution of Kazakhstan. Kazakhstan's parliament has 145 seats. Deputies may be appointed to various parliamentary positions such as chairperson (speaker) of the Kurultai or a head of a committee.

== Lists ==
- List of members of the 1st Kurultai

== See also ==
- Chairman of the Kurultai, main of the Kurultai members
- Deputy Chairman of the Kurultai, deputies of the Kurultai Chairman
- People's Deputy of Ukraine, the Ukrainian equivalent of a Kurultai member
