= Aqorda Press Secretary =

State position in Kazakhstan

Aqorda press secretary Қазақстан Республикасы президентінің баспасөз хатшысы
- Flag of the President of Kazakhstan

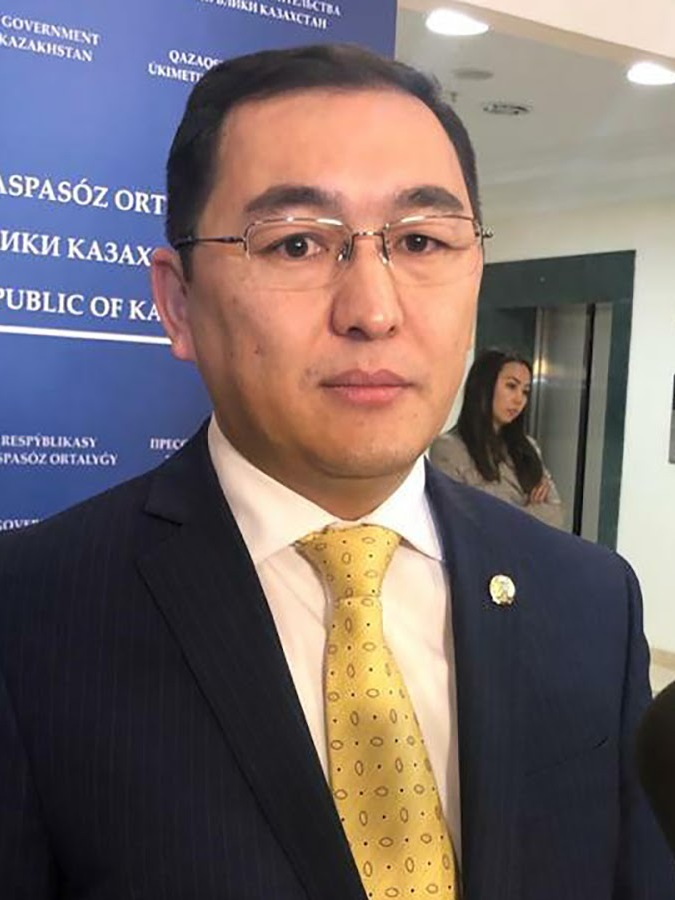
- Incumbent; Aibek Smadiarov since 29 January 2026
- Aqorda Residence; Presidential Administration of Kazakhstan
- Reports to: President of Kazakhstan
- Appointer: President of Kazakhstan
- Formation: 1990
- First holder: Ğadılbek Şalahmetov
- Website: www.akorda.kz

The Aqorda press secretary also press secretary of the president of the Republic of Kazakhstan (Kazakh: Қазақстан Республикасы президентінің баспасөз хатшысы) is an official role within the Presidential Administration, responsible for the information support of the head of state's activities and his interactions with the media.

== Officeholders ==
#	Portrait	Name	Start	End	Source	President
1		Gadilbek Shalakhmetov	December 1990	September 1991		Nursultan Nazarbayev (1990–2019)
2		Seitkazy Mataev	September 1991	1993		Nursultan Nazarbayev (1990–2019)
3		Nurlan Dänenov	1993	1994		Nursultan Nazarbayev (1990–2019)
4		Dulat Kuanyshev	1994	1996		Nursultan Nazarbayev (1990–2019)
5		Krymbek Kusherbayev	1996	1997		Nursultan Nazarbayev (1990–2019)
6		Kairat Sarybai	1997	1998		Nursultan Nazarbayev (1990–2019)
7		Asylbek Bisenbaev	October 1998	December 2001		Nursultan Nazarbayev (1990–2019)
8		Janai Omarov	December 2001	31 March 2004		Nursultan Nazarbayev (1990–2019)
9		Mukhtar Kul-Mukhammed	31 March 2004	11 January 2007		Nursultan Nazarbayev (1990–2019)
10		Erlan Baijanov	8 February 2007	19 August 2008		Nursultan Nazarbayev (1990–2019)
11		Beibit Isabayev	19 August 2008	25 June 2009		Nursultan Nazarbayev (1990–2019)
12		Baglan Mailybayev	25 June 2009	6 October 2011		Nursultan Nazarbayev (1990–2019)
13		Däuren Abaev	6 October 2011	6 May 2016		Nursultan Nazarbayev (1990–2019)
14		Aidos Ükibai	16 May 2016	22 March 2019		Nursultan Nazarbayev (1990–2019)
15		Berik Uali	22 March 2019	29 March 2022		Kassym-Jomart Tokayev (since 2019)
16		Ruslan Jeldibai	14 April 2022	1 September 2023		Kassym-Jomart Tokayev (since 2019)
17		Nurmuhamed Baigaraev	6 September 2023	12 September 2023		Kassym-Jomart Tokayev (since 2019)
18		Berik Uali	12 September 2023	17 February 2025		Kassym-Jomart Tokayev (since 2019)
19		Ruslan Jeldibai	17 February 2025	29 January 2026		Kassym-Jomart Tokayev (since 2019)
20		Aibek Smadiarov	29 January 2026	Incumbent		Kassym-Jomart Tokayev (since 2019)

== History ==
The position of Press Secretary was established in the early 1990s, shortly after the creation of the presidency in the Kazakh SSR. First Aqorda Press Secretary, Gadilbek Shalakhmetov, recalls that the institution of the presidency was only just taking shape at the time, with no one entirely clear on what the role of "press secretary" would entail.

== Functions ==
The Press Secretary of the president covers the president's activities and events involving him, while also preparing and supporting foreign visits and working trips for the media. In addition, it organizes the work of accredited journalists and conducts press conferences, briefings, interviews, and meetings of the president with domestic and foreign media. Key responsibilities include providing professional photo and video coverage of the president and his events, editing texts of speeches, interviews, articles, and other presidential materials, as well as preparing drafts of speeches, interviews, and publications that explain the president's position on domestic and foreign policy issues. The Press Service maintains and develops the president's official website (www.akorda.kz) by updating its design and implementing new technologies; it supplies media outlets with information and materials about the president's activities, coordinates the work of the Presidential Television and Radio Complex during televised coverage of his events, and organizes the commission for awarding presidential prizes and grants in the field of media.

== Appointment ==
The Press Secretary is appointed to the position on the recommendation of the Chief of Staff and dismissed by the President. The President also determines the term of office.

== See also ==
- Aqorda Chief of Staff
- Ministry of Culture and Information
