= Beibit Isabayev =

Kazakh politician (born 1962)

- Бейбіт Исабаев
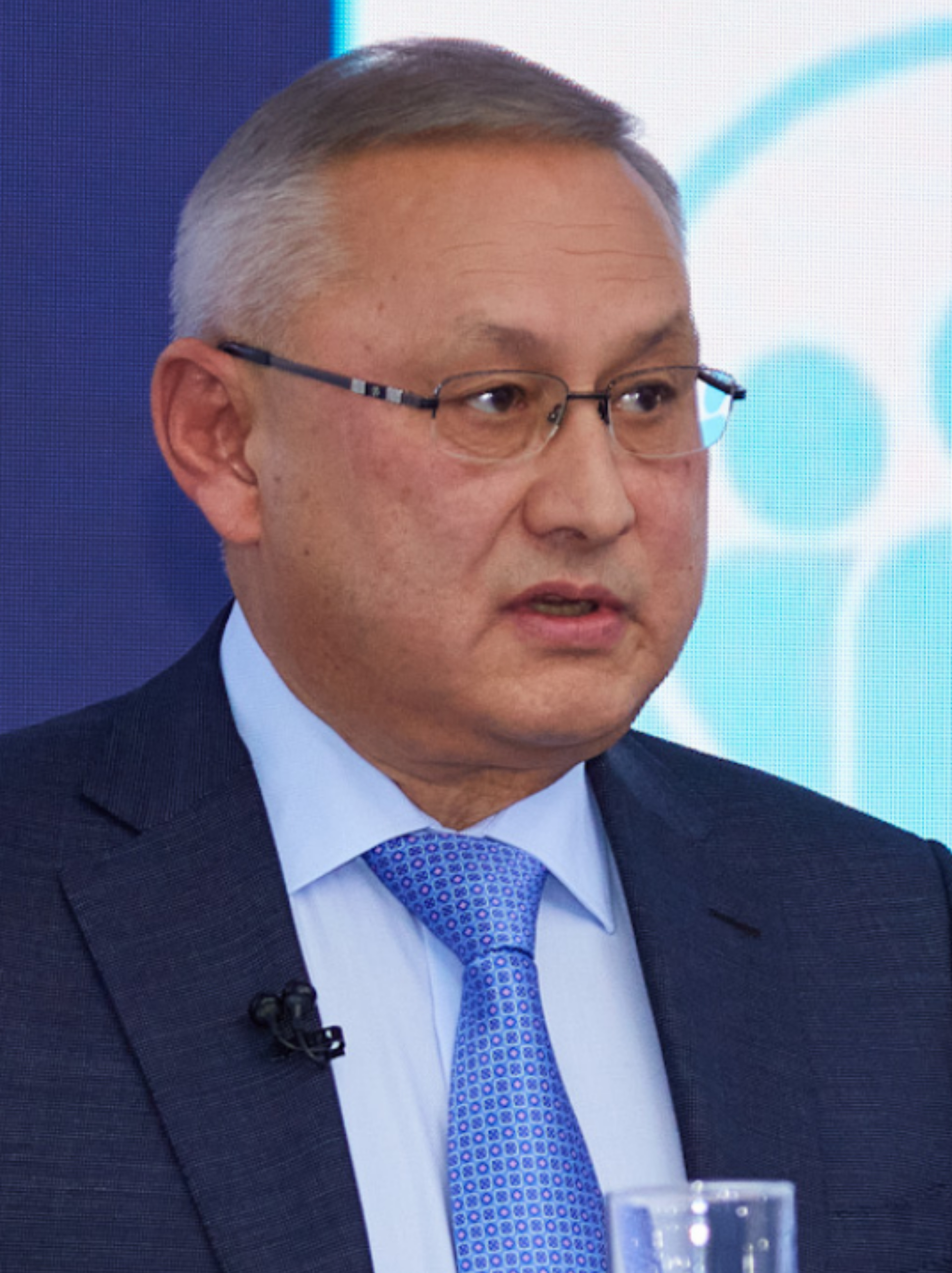
- Isabayev in 2023

Äkim of Jetisu Region
- Incumbent
- Assumed office 11 June 2022
- President: Kassym-Jomart Tokayev
- Preceded by: Region established

Member of the Senate
- In office 13 January 2022 – 11 June 2022
- Appointed by: Kassym-Jomart Tokayev
- Preceded by: Saule Aitpayeva

Kazakh ambassador to Azerbaijan
- In office 16 March 2015 – 19 July 2019
- President: Nursultan Nazarbayev; Kassym-Jomart Tokayev
- Preceded by: Amangeldy Jumabayev
- Succeeded by: Serjan Abdykarimov

Kazakh ambassador to Kyrgyzstan
- In office 15 July 2009 – 16 March 2015
- President: Nursultan Nazarbayev
- Preceded by: Baqyt Ospanov
- Succeeded by: Aiymdos Bosjigitov

Aqorda Press Secretary
- In office 19 August 2008 – 25 June 2009
- President: Nursultan Nazarbayev
- Preceded by: Erlan Baijanov
- Succeeded by: Baglan Mailybayev

Kazakh ambassador to Albania
- In office 19 July 2007 – 27 February 2008
- President: Nursultan Nazarbayev
- Succeeded by: Baghdad Amreyev

Kazakh ambassador to Turkey
- In office 25 April 2006 – 27 February 2008
- President: Nursultan Nazarbayev
- Preceded by: Amanjol Jankuliyev
- Succeeded by: Baghdad Amreyev

Kazakh ambassador to Pakistan
- In office 20 August 2003 – 25 April 2006
- President: Nursultan Nazarbayev
- Preceded by: Bekjasar Narbayev
- Succeeded by: Baqytbek Shabarbayev

Personal details
- Born: 4 December 1962 (age 63) Bakanas, Balkhash, Almaty Region, Kazakh SSR, Soviet Union
- Party: Amanat
- Spouse: Asiya Igensartova
- Children: 3
- Education: Diplomatic Academy of the Ministry of Foreign Affairs of the Republic of Kazakhstan; Kazakh State University
- Awards: Taraggi Medal; Order of Kurmet

Military service
- Rank: Senior lieutenant (reserve)

Beibit Öksikbaiūly Isabayev (Note: Often transliterated as Beibit Oksikbaevich Isabaev through a Russified Romanization of Бейбит Оксикбаевич Исабаев.) (Kazakh: Бейбіт Өксікбайұлы Исабаев; born 4 December 1962) is a Kazakh diplomat and politician serving as the akim of Jetisu Region since 2022. He previously served as the member of Senate from January to June 2022.

== Early life and education ==
Beibit Oksikbaiuly Isabayev was born on December 4, 1962, in Bakanas, a village in Balkhash District, Almaty Region, Kazakh Soviet Socialist Republic, Soviet Union (now Kazakhstan).

In 1985, he graduated from the Kazakh State University (now Kazakh National University) with a degree in journalism.

== Early career ==
After graduating from the Kazakh State University in 1985, he joined the State Committee of the Kazakh SSR as an editor for television and radio. From 1987 to 1991 he worked at the republican newspaper Lenin's Youth (Kazakh: Лениншіл Жас), first as a correspondent and later as head of its department. In 1991 he moved to the newspapers Orken and Gorizont, serving successively as deputy editor and then editor-in-chief. In February 1994, he was appointed general director of Kazakh State Television.

Three months later, in May 1994, he transferred to the Almaty City Administration as a deputy head. He held that post briefly before being appointed chairman of the City Committee for Internal Policy in July of the same year. In 1995 he was named deputy akim of city.

From 1997 to 1999 he studied at the Diplomatic Academy of the Ministry of Foreign Affairs of Kazakhstan in the international relations program. In 1998 he defended his candidate dissertation, titled “Mass Media and Ethnopolitical Processes in the Republic of Kazakhstan,” and was awarded the degree of Candidate of Political Sciences. After graduating, he headed the Department of the Administration of the Ministry of Foreign Affairs.

After one year in that role, he moved to the prime minister's Office to lead the Government Information Department.

== Political career ==
In May 2002, he returned to the MFA as an adviser to minister Kassym-Jomart Tokayev, and in September of the same year, he was appointed ambassador-at-large. In December 2002, he became Kazakhstan's national coordinator for the Central Asian Cooperation Organization.

By president Nursultan Nazarbayev's decree on August 20, 2003, he was appointed Kazakh ambassador to Pakistan. On December 13, 2005, while serving in that post, he was granted the diplomatic rank of Extraordinary and Plenipotentiary Envoy 1st Class, by presidential decree No. 1683.

April 25, 2006, upon relinquishing his previous post, he was appointed ambassador to Turkey, a position that had been vacant since October of the preceding year. Nearly a year later, on July 19, 2007, he was concurrently appointed ambassador to Albania.

On February 27, 2008, upon returning to Kazakhstan, he was appointed deputy minister of culture and information under Ermukhamet Ertisbaev by prime minister Massimov's decree No. 200.

By president Nazarbayev's decree on August 19, 2008, he was released from that post and appointed his spokesman.

On July 15, 2009, he assumed the post of ambassador to Kyrgyzstan.

On March 16, 2015, he was appointed ambassador to Azerbaijan.

Following the transfer of the presidency from Nazarbayev to Kassym-Jomart Tokayev in March 2019, he returned from Azerbaijan and on July 19, became Tokayev's first representative in Parliament. After the January Tragedy in 2022 and subsequent government reshuffle, he was appointed senator by Tokayev's decree No. 768 on January 13, and, on 20 January, was elected chair of the Senate Committee on Social, Cultural Development and Science.

On January 28, he joined the Nur Otan, that party was renamed Amanat two months later.

On May 3, 2022, by Tokayev's decree three new regions were established Abai (from part of East Kazakhstan, formerly Semipalatinsk), Jetisu (from Almaty Region, formerly Taldykorgan) and Ulytau (from Karaganda Region, formerly Jezkazgan).

June 11, president Tokayev proposed Isabayev and Bagdat Karasayev (akim of Ile District) for the new post of akim of Jetisu Region. In an open vote attended by 141 all Maslihats members, Isabayev received 106 votes while Karasayev received 35. After winning the vote and by Tokayev's decree No. 45 Isabayev was appointed 1st akim of Jetisu Region. Three days later, Central Election Commission Resolution No. 49/511 terminated his parliamentary mandate.

== Personal life ==
Isabayev is married to the journalist and Candidate of Philological Sciences Asiya Gabdimanqyzy Igensartova. (Note: Although her patronymic appears as “Gabdimanqyzy,” she has stated in an interview that Gabdiman is her grandfather and that her father’s name is Aset. Her father’s patronymic is the same as hers, “Gabdimanuly.” Official websites likewise describe Asiya Igensartova as the granddaughter of Gabdiman Igensartov.) Her grandfather, Gabdiman Igensartov (1902–1976), was a poet who was recognized as a People's aqyn of the Kazakh SSR in 1962, while her father, Aset Igensartov, is a mining engineer and an Honored Miner of the Sovet Union. Isabayev and Igensartova have two daughters, Ainur (born 1984) and Aigerim (born 1986), and a son, Kabyl (born 1999).

== Awards ==
- Order of Kurmet (2007)
- Taraggi Medal (Azerbaijan, 2018)
- Medal of Glory (Kyrgyzstan, 2021)
- Medal “10 years of the Constitution of Kazakhstan” (2005)
- Medal “10 years of the Parliament of Kazakhstan” (2005)
- Certificate of Honor of Kazakhstan (2001)
