= Oljas Bektenov =

Prime Minister of Kazakhstan since 2024

- Олжас Бектенов
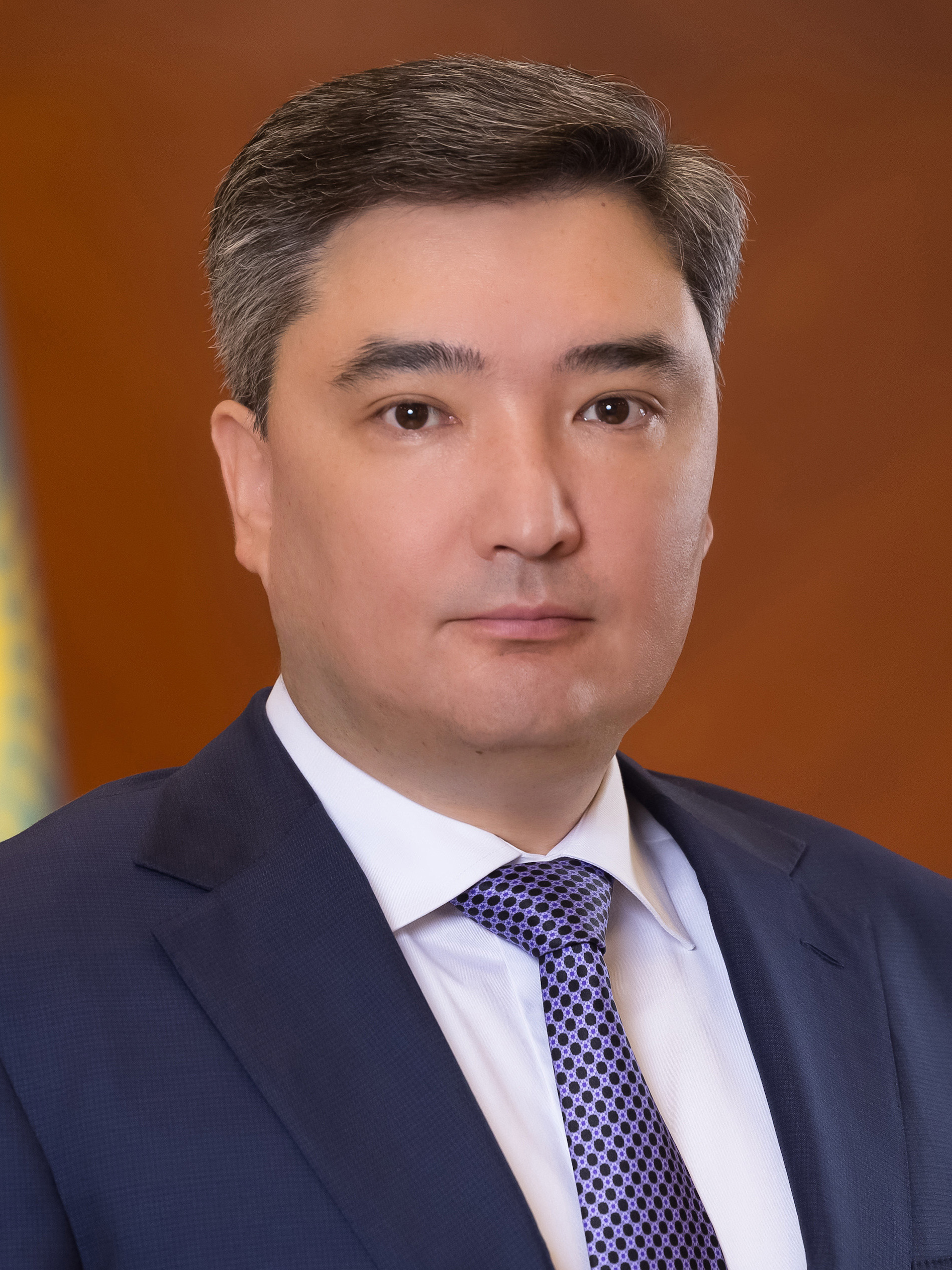
- Official portrait, 2024

12th Prime Minister of Kazakhstan
- Incumbent
- Assumed office 6 February 2024 (Note: Acting: 28–31 August 2026)
- President: Kassym-Jomart Tokayev
- First Deputy: Roman Sklyar; Nurlybek Nalibaev
- Preceded by: Älihan Smaiylov

Aqorda Chief of Staff
- In office 3 April 2023 – 6 February 2024
- President: Kassym-Jomart Tokayev
- First Deputy: Timur Suleimenov
- Preceded by: Murat Nurtleu
- Succeeded by: Aybek Dädebay

Chairman of the Anti-Corruption Agency
- In office 25 February 2021 – 3 April 2023
- President: Kassym-Jomart Tokayev
- Preceded by: Marat Ahmetjanov
- Succeeded by: Ashat Jumağali

Personal details
- Born: 13 December 1980 (age 45) Alma-Ata, Alma-Ata Oblast, Kazakh SSR, Soviet Union
- Party: Independent
- Children: 3
- Education: Kazakh State Law Academy

Oljas Abaiūly Bektenov (Note: Often transliterated as Olzhas Abayevich Bektenov through a Russified Romanization of Олжас Абаевич Бектенов.) (Kazakh: Олжас Абайұлы Бектенов [woɫʒɑ́s ɑbɑ́jʊɫə́ bʲektʰʲénəf]; born 13 December 1980) is a Kazakh politician who has served as the prime minister of Kazakhstan since February 2024.

Prior to his premiership, Bektenov held a number of senior positions. He served as deputy chairman of the Agency for Civil Service Affairs and Anti-Corruption from 2018, and was later appointed chairman of the Anti-Corruption Agency, a post he held from 2021 to 2023. He subsequently served as head of the Administration of the President.

== Early life and education ==
Born in the city of Alma-Ata, Kazakh Soviet Socialist Republic, now called Almaty, Bektenov graduated with honors from the Kazakh State Law Academy, now the KAZGUU University, in 2001, with a degree in jurisprudence. He furthered his academic career by obtaining a candidate of sciences in law, focusing his dissertation on "Organizational and Legal Problems of Prevention of Administrative Delinquency of Minors in the Republic of Kazakhstan".

== Early career ==
Throughout his career, Bektenov has held various leadership roles. He began his tenure as the chief specialist at the Department of Justice of Almaty from 2002 to 2005, before ultimately becoming an expert and then the chief expert of the legal department at the Office of the Prime Minister of Kazakhstan from 2005 to 2006.

In subsequent years, Bektenov played key roles within the Kazakh government. He served in the Presidential Administration under Nursultan Nazarbayev from 2006 to 2009, and was deputy chairman of the Committee for Registration Service and Legal Assistance at the Ministry of Justice from 2009 to 2012.

In the years that followed, Bektenov was tasked with combating corruption in Kazakhstan. He served as the Head of department at the central office of the Agency for Combating Economic and Corruption Crimes of Kazakhstan (Financial Police) from 2012 to 2014, then as Chief of Staff of the Astana City Akimat from July 2015, and later as head of the Secretariat of the Chief of Staff of the Presidential Administration.

== Anti-Corruption Agency ==
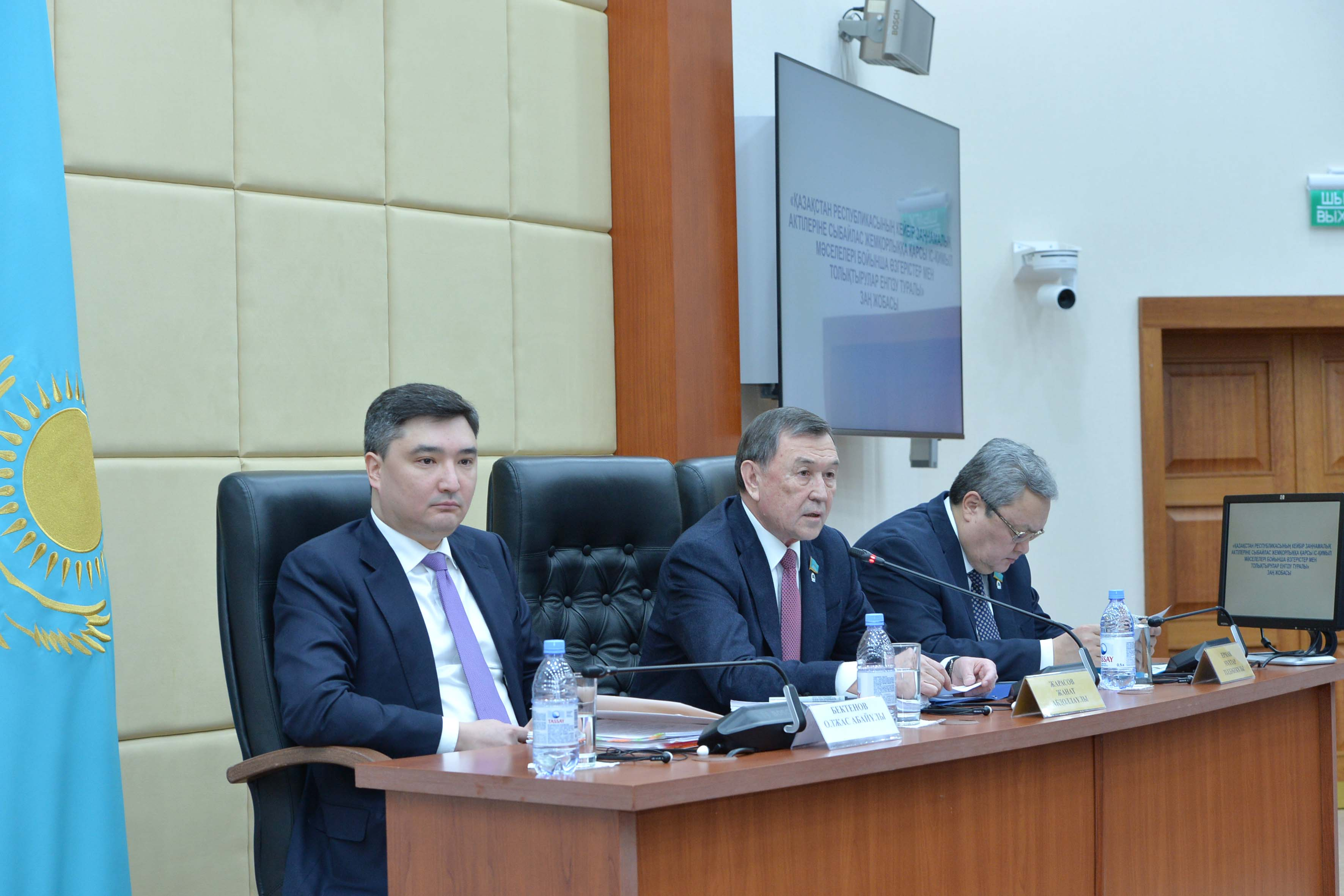
Bektenov as an Antikor official during a parliamentary meeting, February 2020

In recognition of his service and leadership, Bektenov was appointed as the Deputy Chairman of the Agency of the Republic of Kazakhstan for Civil Service Affairs and Anti-Corruption on 1 June 2018. He served in this role for a year before being dismissed on 20 June 2019. Shortly thereafter, Bektenov was transferred to the position of First Deputy Chairman on 26 June 2019.

As a First Deputy Chairman, Bektenov emphasized the importance of the role that the Head of Antikor could play in addressing the rights of entrepreneurs. He highlighted the importance of considering social issues within the region and implementing effective measures to address them, stressing that the results should be beneficial for both citizens and entrepreneurs in the region.

On 25 February 2022, Bektenov assumed the chairmanship of the Anti-Corruption Agency of the Republic of Kazakhstan. His appointment followed the January 2022 unrest, during which Antikor, under Bektenov's guidance, investigated the financial dealings of former President Nursultan Nazarbayev's relatives. This led to the arrest of Nazarbayev's nephew, Kairat Satybaldy, for defrauding Kazakhtelecom and a railway services company, and his son-in-law, Kairat Boranbayev, for corruption in the quasi-public sector. Both received six-year prison sentences.

Throughout Bektenov's leadership, Antikor pursued high-profile corruption cases, including that of Medet Qumarğaliev, the ex-General Director of Operator ÖKM LLP, who was accused of embezzling over 20 billion tenge by inflating vehicle recycling costs from 2016 to 2021. Another case focused on Nurlan Masimov, cousin of former chairman of the National Security Committee and ex-PM Karim Masimov, who served as the former head of the Police Department of Pavlodar Region, with allegations of inefficient budget planning and use. Additionally, a case concerning illegal car registrations by an organized criminal group within the state-owned enterprise Government for Citizens was uncovered, resulting in the illegal registration of 486 vehicles and incurring financial damages, costing the state and its citizens approximately one billion tenge.

In December 2022, Bektenov met with Charles Duchaine, the director of the French Anti-Corruption Agency, in Paris, where they signed a memorandum of cooperation aimed at preventing and combating corruption.

Under Bektenov's leadership, significant changes in departmental leadership occurred due to corruption issues, with over 100 employees facing disciplinary action within Antikor, resulting in nine convictions. Moreover, assets worth more than 650 billion tenge were recovered, which were reallocated for the building of kindergartens and schools in Kazakhstan. External analyses of corruption risks in the quasi-public sector, such as Samruk-Kazyna and Kazakhstan Temir Joly, were conducted, leading to the identification of violations and the initiation of criminal cases. Bektenov also introduced the Corruption Risks Map, highlighting the most corrupt areas in the region for closer attention. Furthermore, the Bizneske Jol project was launched, with the participation of 6,000 entrepreneurs, aimed at supporting businesses. Moreover, Bektenov's tenure saw the adoption of the Law "On Illegal Enrichment," and the exclusion of the possibility of parole for convicts on serious corruption charges.

== Tokayev administration ==
On 3 April 2023, Bektenov was appointed Chief of Staff of the Presidential Administration under Kassym-Jomart Tokayev. In this role, he concentrated on reducing bureaucracy and improving efficiency through an administrative restructuring that merged overlapping departments and created the new position of Assistant to the President. These assistants assumed responsibility for key areas, including economic and foreign policy, replacing the former deputy head roles. Bektenov also enabled the government to adopt and modify socioeconomic strategies and regional development plans with greater autonomy, thereby lessening the need for continual approval from the executive branch.

== Prime Minister of Kazakhstan ==
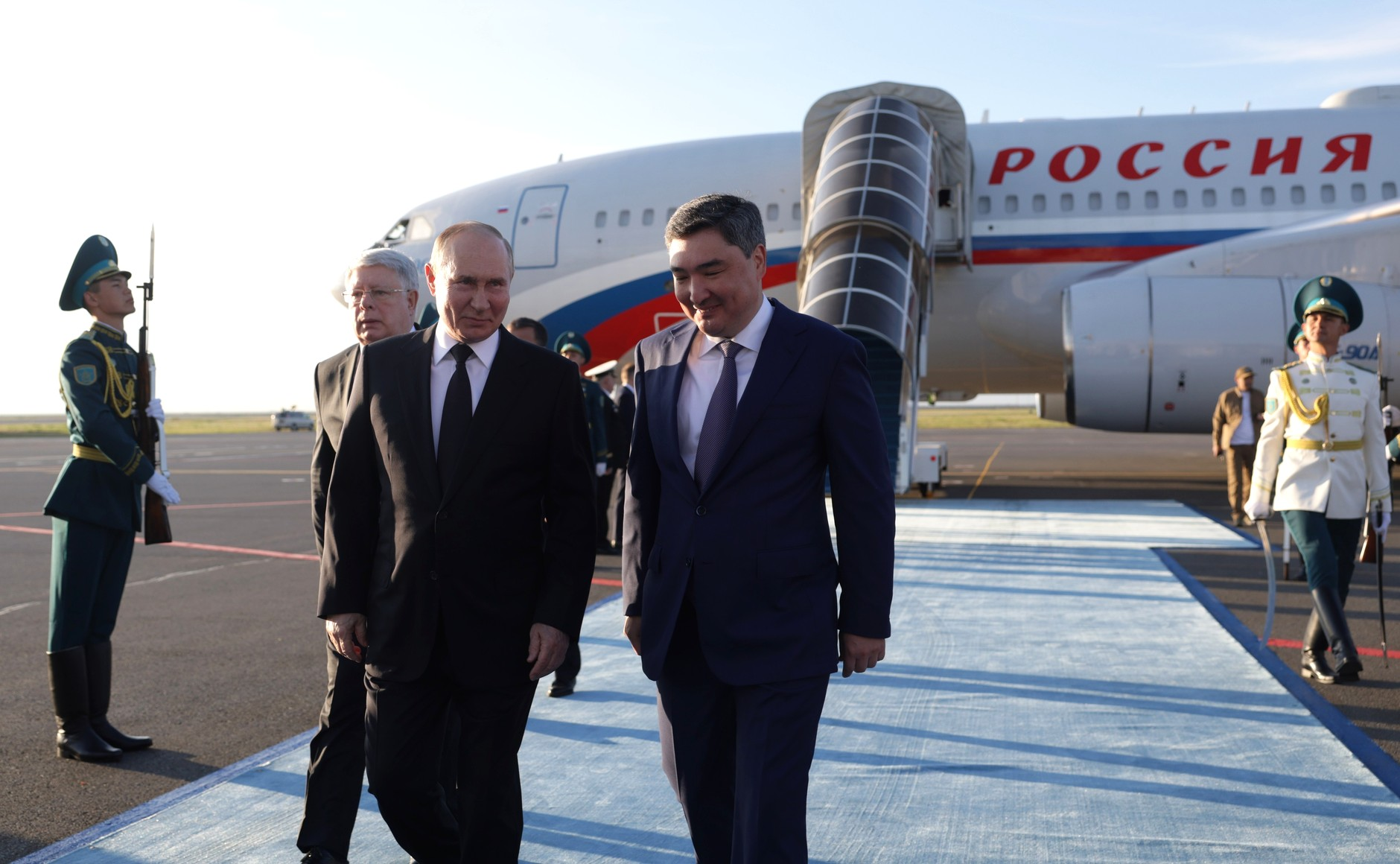
Oljas Bektenov and Vladimir Putin in Astana, 3 July 2024

After the resignation of the government, the ruling Amanat party backed Bektenov for the role of Prime Minister of Kazakhstan on 6 February 2024. President Kassym-Jomart Tokayev nominated Bektenov's candidacy on behalf of the party to which his nomination was subsequently supported by the Mäjilis on the same day, thus officially appointing him to lead the newly-formed government, and therefore making Bektenov the first silovik to become prime minister in independent Kazakhstan's history. Following the parliamentary approval, Bektenov, in an address to deputies, pledged to prioritize national businesses over foreign interests, especially in agriculture, while improving infrastructure and cutting unnecessary costs.

Shortly upon assuming office, Bektenov, at the following cabinet meeting, proclaimed that his premiership would be a "government of decisive action" to enhance growth rates, diversify the economy, attract investment, and address challenges. He urged ministers to work independently and swiftly address industry issues at their level, stressing that the government's "pace of work will be high, and the demand will be tough".

One of the first major challenges that the Bektenov Government faced was the 2024 Central Asian floods that broke out in 10 different Kazakh regions. This led to the appointment of Kanat Bozumbayev as deputy prime minister, and thus, his "return to politics".

During his premiership, which, as he pledged, would be "More deeds, fewer words," Bektenov has repeatedly brought up the state of the economy of Kazakhstan, the GDP of which was reported to be growing. In September 2024, he reported to Tokayev regarding it.

Bektenov went on to be re-appointed as Prime Minister on 31 August 2026 following the 2026 Kazakh constitutional referendum, the 2026 Kazakh legislative election, and the subsequent reforms.

== Personal life ==
Bektenov is known to be married. He has three children, but the names of his family members are unknown, which, as journalist Vadim Boreiko remarks, is unusual and shows how secretive officials under Tokayev are.

Kazakh journalist Azamat Maitanov from Atyrau alleged that Bektenov came to power through nepotism, by claiming that he's the son-in-law of Adilbek Zhaksybekov. Activist Sanjar Boqaev and writer Vadim Boreiko remarked that there really are parallels between the careers of the two, but they did not find enough information to confirm or deny the accusation.
