= 2026 Chairman of the Kurultai election =

- 28 August 2026

Needed to win: Majority of the votes cast 145 votes cast, 73 needed for a majority
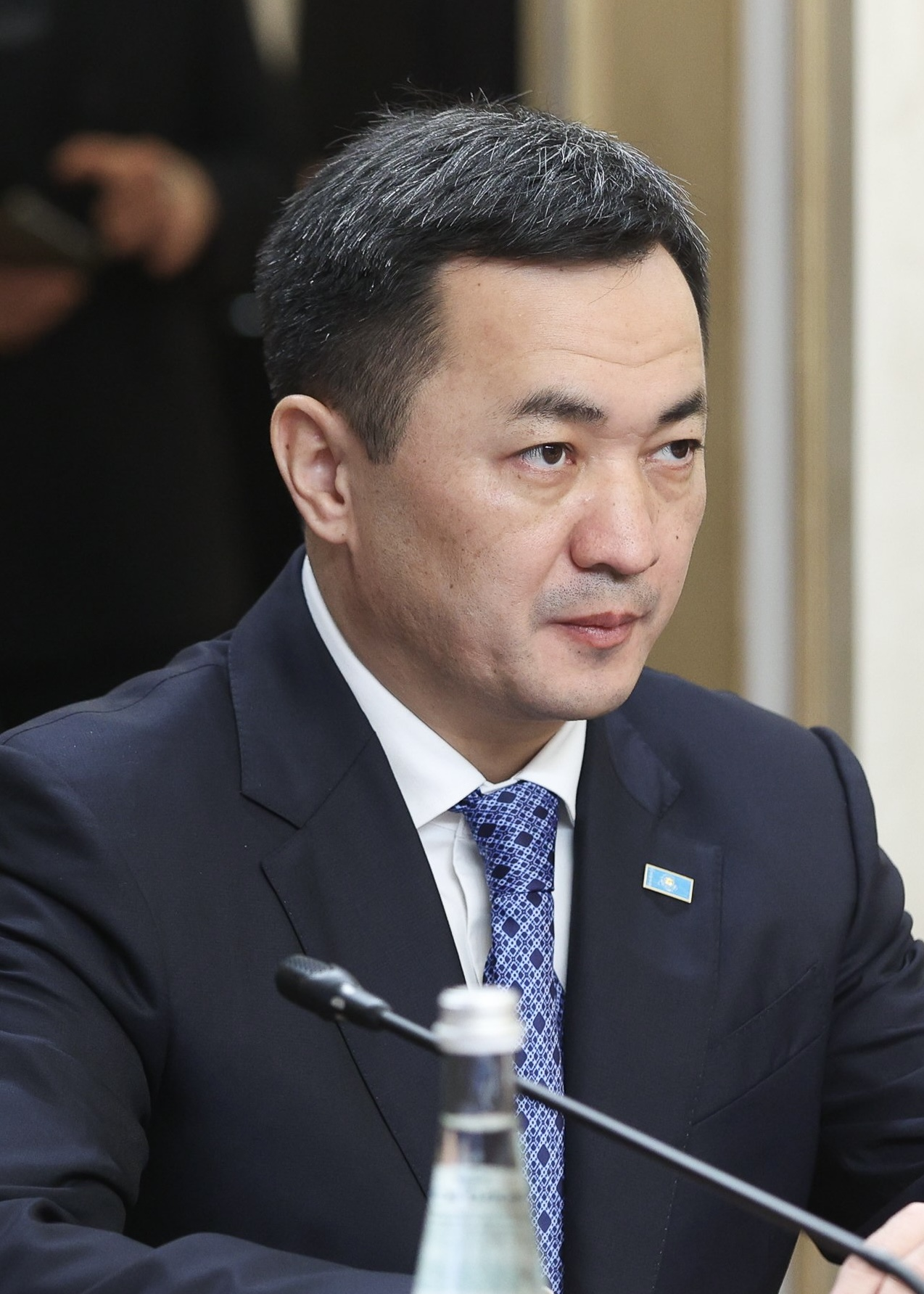
	First party
Candidate	Aibek Dädebai
Party	Adilet
Popular vote	144
Percentage	100%
Elected Chairman
Aibek Dädebai
Adilet

The 2026 Chairman of the Kurultai election was held on 28 August 2026 during the first session of the Kurultai of the 1st convocation. It was the first election for chairman of Kazakhstan's newly established unicameral legislature, created following the adoption of the 2026 constitution. President Kassym-Jomart Tokayev nominated Aibek Dädebai, leader of the Ädilet party, for the position. Dädebai was subsequently elected chairman by the Kurultai.

== Background ==
The election followed the 2026 Kazakh legislative election, held on 23 August 2026, which elected all 145 deputies of the 1st Kurultai. The new legislature replaced the previous bicameral Parliament of Kazakhstan following the entry into force of the 2026 constitution.

The newly elected Kurultai convened for its first session on 28 August 2026. During the opening session, Tokayev outlined the legislature's priorities, including bringing existing legislation into conformity with the new constitution and maintaining the stability and quality of lawmaking under the new unicameral parliamentary system.

== Procedure ==
Under Article 9 of the Constitutional Law "On the Kurultai of the Republic of Kazakhstan and the Status of its Deputies", the chairman of the Central Election Commission presided over the first session until a chairman of the Kurultai was elected. Under Article 11, the chairman was elected from among deputies fluent in the state language by secret ballot and by a majority of the total number of deputies, with the candidate nominated by the president.

== Election ==
Tokayev nominated Aibek Dädebai as chairman of the Kurultai at the opening session. Dädebai, who had previously become leader of the newly formed Ädilet party, was subsequently elected Kurultai chairman by the deputies with 144 votes in favour and one abstention.

=== Candidates ===
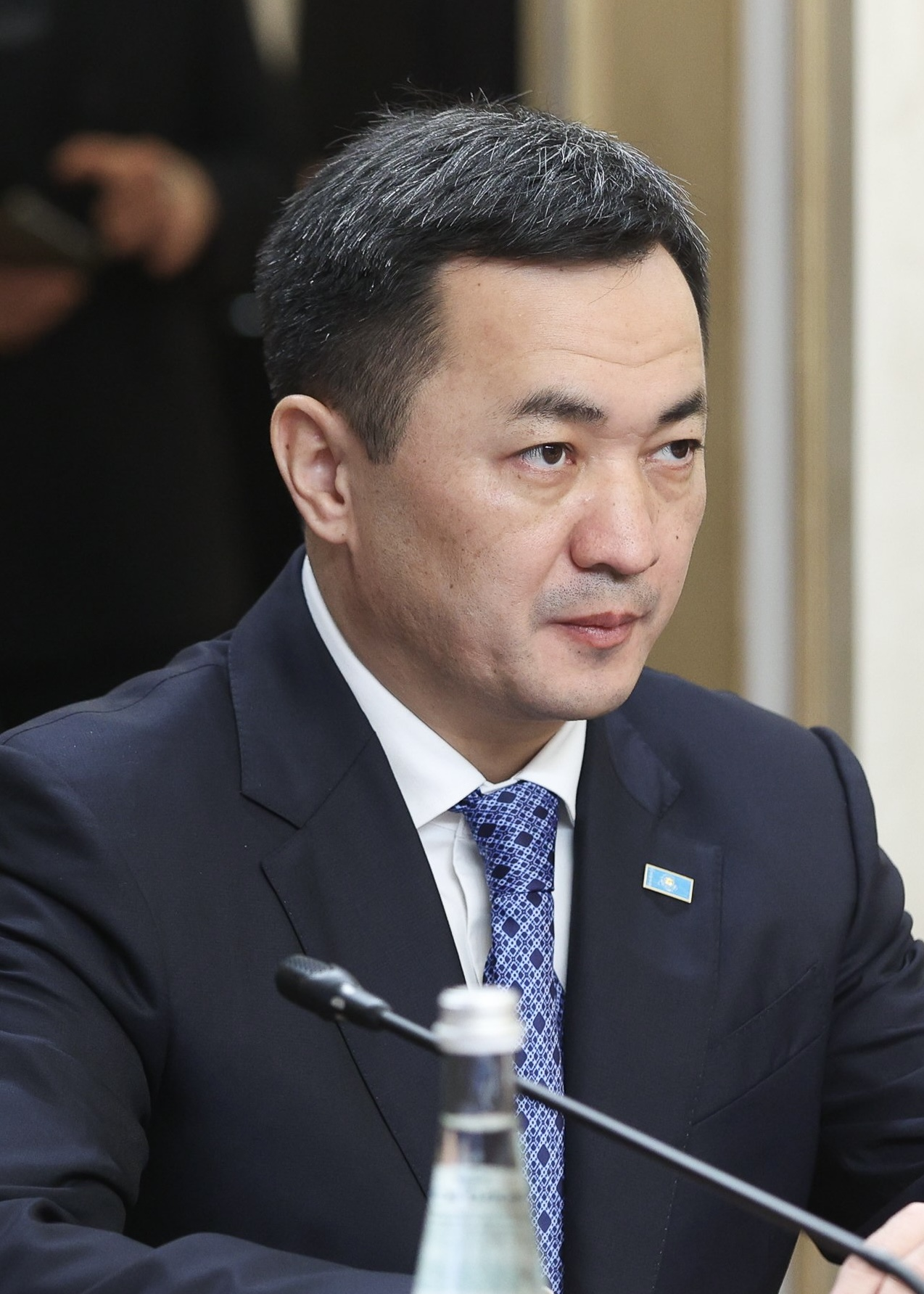
Aibek Dädebai Ädilet
- Aibek Dädebai, Chairman of Ädilet (2026–present), Member of the Kurultai (2026–present), Aqorda Chief of Staff (2024–2026)

=== Results ===
Candidate	Party	Votes	%
Aibek Dädebai	Ädilet	144	100.00
Total		144	100.00
Valid votes		144	99.31
Invalid/blank votes		1	0.69
Total votes		145	100.00
Registered voters/turnout		145	100.00

== Aftermath ==
Following his election, Dädebai thanked Tokayev for nominating him and the deputies for their support. He described the position as both an honour and a responsibility and said that the Kurultai would work to implement the tasks set out by the president, strengthen statehood and improve the well-being of citizens. The first session subsequently proceeded with establishing the Kurultai's organizational structure, including its committees, and addressing other matters related to the beginning of the first convocation.
