= 8th Congress of the Ak Zhol Democratic Party =

Khazakh political party congress

2011 Aq Jol chairmanship election
- 2 July 2011
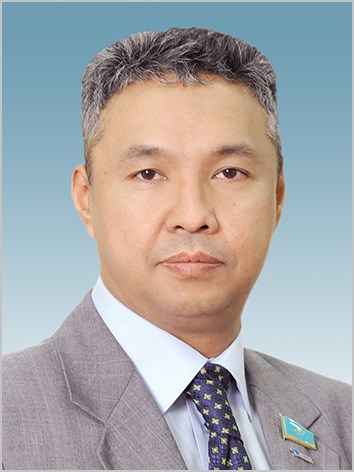
Candidate	Azat Peruashev
Party	Ak Zhol
Delegate vote	137
Percentage	100%
Chairman before election
Alikhan Baimenov
Elected Chairman
Azat Peruashev

The 8th Congress of the Ak Zhol Democratic Party was held on 2 July 2011 in Astana. Azat Peruashev was unanimously elected by the 137 delegates to be the new party's chairman, succeeding Alikhan Baimenov who had previously held the post since 2005.

== Background ==
By a presidential decree of 1 July 2011, the Incumbent Chairman Alikhan Baimenov of Ak Zhol was appointed as a Chairman of the Agency for Civil Service Affairs of Kazakhstan, opening a new seat for the leadership for the party.

== Procedure ==
On 2 July, an 8th Congress was held to elect the new chairman of the party. Azat Peruashev, who a day earlier left the ranks of the ruling party of the Nur Otan, joined Ak Zhol and was endorsed by Baimenov to succeeded him. With the 137 delegates participating in the convention, Peruashev was unanimously voted to be the new chairman.
