= Presidential Administration of Kazakhstan =

Presidential Administration of the Republic of Kazakhstan
- Қазақстан Республикасы Президентінің Әкімшілігі (Kazakh); Администрация Президента Республики Казахстан (Russian)
- Flag of the president of Kazakhstan

Agency overview
- Formed: 20 October 1995; 30 years ago
- Headquarters: Astana, Kazakhstan
- Employees: 408
- Agency executive: Roman Sklyar, Aqorda Chief of Staff
- Website: akorda.kz

The Executive Office of the President or the Presidential Administration of the Republic of Kazakhstan (Kazakh: Қазақстан Республикасы Президентінің Әкімшілігі, romanized: Qazaqstan Respublikasy Prezidentınıñ Äkımşılıgı; Russian: Администрация Президента Республики Казахстан, romanized: Administratsiya Prezidenta Respubliki Kazakhstan) is an executive office of the President of Kazakhstan, established in accordance with Presidential Decree No. 2565 of Nursultan Nazarbayev on 20 October 1995. It is formed by the President, to whom the staff reports directly.

== Functions ==
- Ensuring the activities of the President of the Republic of Kazakhstan to determine the main directions of the state's foreign and domestic policy.
- Informing the president about the situation in the country and abroad.
- Coordinate and control the execution of legislative orders of the President of the Republic of Kazakhstan.
- Assessment of the effectiveness of the central executive bodies, akims of regions, cities of republican significance, and the capital, as well as development of recommendations for improving their activities.
- Implementation of other tasks and works is determined by the President.

== Management ==
The management of the Administration, as of 2026 was:

- Aqorda Chief of Staff Roman Sklyar;
- Deputy Chiefs of Staff Assel Janassova, Erjan Jienbaev;
- Assistant to the President for Domestic Policy and Communications Eldar Tolganbaev;
- Assistant to the President Kuanyshbek Yessekeev;
- Assistant to the President for International Investment and Trade Cooperation Murat Nurtileu;
- Assistant to the President for Economic Affairs Nurlan Baibazarov;
- Head of the Chancellery of the President Baqytjan Sariev;
- Advisors to the President Bauyrjan Omarov, Mälik Otarbaev, Baqytjan Sapiev, Magzum Myrzagaliev;
- Advisor to the President — chief of the Protocol Service of the President Marat Äşım;
- Advisor to the President for International Affairs Ernar Lazar;
- Advisor to the President on Social Issues Alexey Tsoy;
- Advisor to the President — Aqorda Press Secretary Aibek Smadiarov;
- Advisor to the President — Chairman of the Agency for Strategic Planning and Reforms Aset Irgaliyev

== List of heads ==
=== Chief of the Apparatus of the President of the Kazakh SSR / Kazakhstan (1990–1995) ===
| # | Portrait | Name | Start | End | Source | President |
|---|---|---|---|---|---|---|
| 1 | | Nurtai Abykayev | May 1990 | October 1995 | | Nursultan Nazarbayev |

=== Chief of Staff Presidential Executive Office (1995–) ===
| # | Portrait | Name | Start | End | Source | President |
|---|---|---|---|---|---|---|
| 1 | | Sağynbek Tursynov | October 1995 | June 1996 | | Nursultan Nazarbayev (1990–2019) |
| – | | Akhmedjan Essimov | June 1996 | October 1996 | | Nursultan Nazarbayev (1990–2019) |
| 2 | | Oralbai Äbdıkärımov | October 1996 | October 1997 | | Nursultan Nazarbayev (1990–2019) |
| 3 | | Sarybai Qalmyrzaev | October 1997 | January 1998 | | Nursultan Nazarbayev (1990–2019) |
| – | | Vladimir Shepel | January 1998 | February 1998 | | Nursultan Nazarbayev (1990–2019) |
| 4 | | Akhmedjan Essimov | February 1998 | August 1998 | | Nursultan Nazarbayev (1990–2019) |
| 5 | | Älihan Bäimenov | August 1998 | February 1999 | | Nursultan Nazarbayev (1990–2019) |
| 6 | | Sarybai Qalmyrzaev | February 1999 | January 2002 | | Nursultan Nazarbayev (1990–2019) |
| 7 | | Nurtai Abykayev | 29 January 2002 | 10 March 2004 | | Nursultan Nazarbayev (1990–2019) |
| 8 | | Imangali Tasmagambetov | 10 March 2004 | 9 December 2004 | | Nursultan Nazarbayev (1990–2019) |
| 9 | | Ädılbek Jaqsybekov | 9 December 2004 | 23 January 2008 | | Nursultan Nazarbayev (1990–2019) |
| 10 | | Kairat Kelimbetov | 23 January 2008 | 13 October 2008 | | Nursultan Nazarbayev (1990–2019) |
| 11 | | Aslan Musin | 13 October 2008 | 21 October 2012 | | Nursultan Nazarbayev (1990–2019) |
| 12 | | Karim Massimov | 21 October 2012 | 3 April 2014 | | Nursultan Nazarbayev (1990–2019) |
| 13 | | Nūrlan Nyğmatulin | 3 April 2014 | 21 June 2016 | | Nursultan Nazarbayev (1990–2019) |
| 14 | | Ädılbek Jaqsybekov | 21 June 2016 | 10 September 2018 | | Nursultan Nazarbayev (1990–2019) |
| 15 | | Asset Issekeshev | 10 September 2018 | 24 March 2019 | | Nursultan Nazarbayev (1990–2019) |
| 16 | | Bakhytzhan Sagintayev | 24 March 2019 | 28 June 2019 | | Kassym-Jomart Tokayev (since 2019) |
| 17 | | Qyrymbek Köşerbaev | 28 June 2019 | 18 September 2019 | | Kassym-Jomart Tokayev (since 2019) |
| 18 | | Erlan Qoşanov | 18 September 2019 | 1 February 2022 | | Kassym-Jomart Tokayev (since 2019) |
| 19 | | Murat Nurtileu | 1 February 2022 | 3 April 2023 | | Kassym-Jomart Tokayev (since 2019) |
| 20 | | Oljas Bektenov | 3 April 2023 | 6 February 2024 | | Kassym-Jomart Tokayev (since 2019) |
| 21 | | Aybek Dädebay | 6 February 2024 | 5 May 2026 | | Kassym-Jomart Tokayev (since 2019) |
| 22 | | Roman Sklyar | 5 May 2026 | Incumbent | | Kassym-Jomart Tokayev (since 2019) |
