= Aibek Dädebai =

Kazakh politician (born 1980)

- Айбек Дәдебай
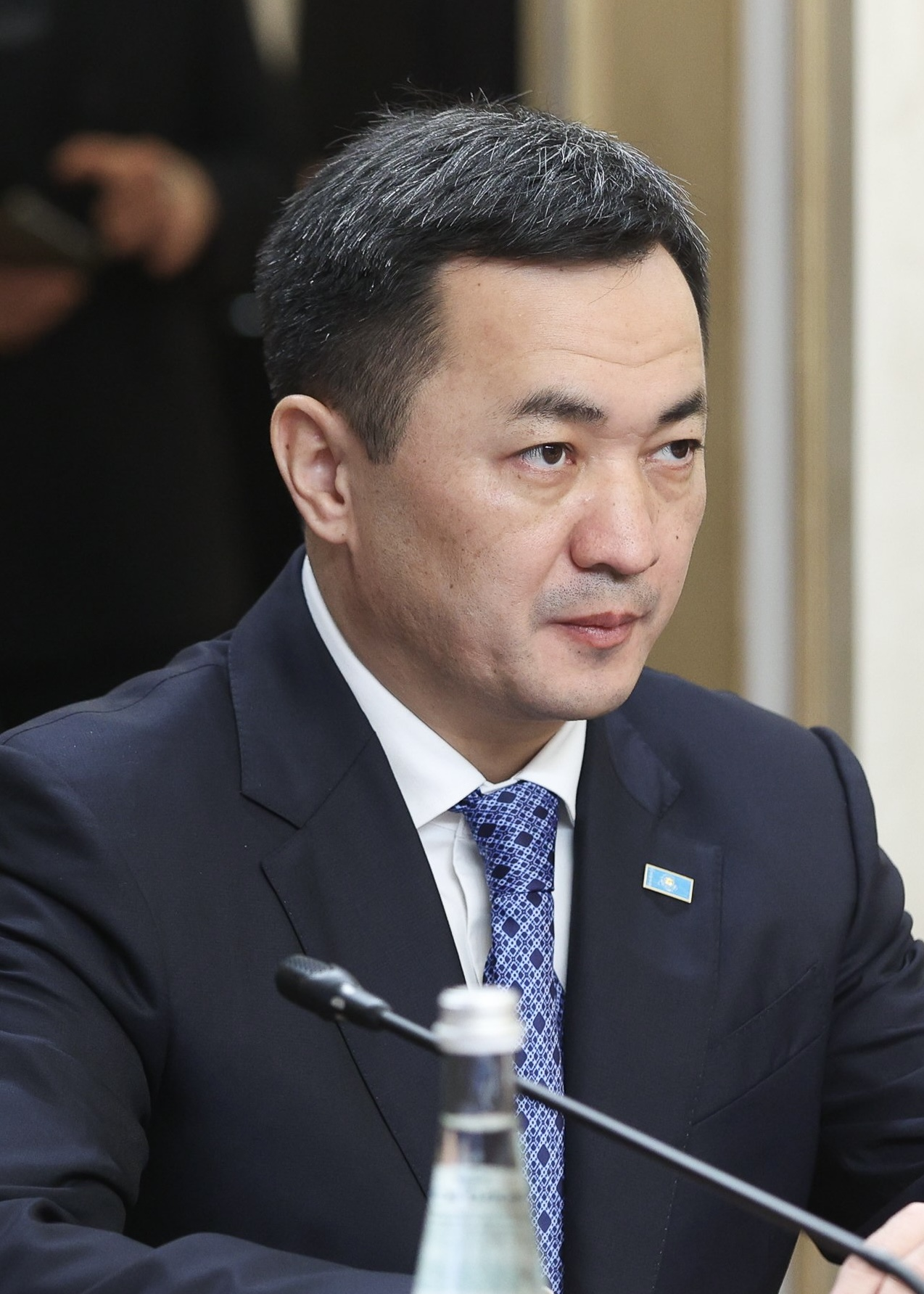
- Dädebai in 2025

Chairman of the Kurultai
- Incumbent
- Assumed office 28 August 2026
- Preceded by: Office established

Member of the Kurultai
- Incumbent
- Assumed office 27 August 2026
- Preceded by: Office established

Chairman of Ädilet
- Incumbent
- Assumed office 7 May 2026
- Preceded by: Office established

Aqorda Chief of Staff
- In office 6 February 2024 – 5 May 2026
- President: Kassym-Jomart Tokayev
- Deputy: Assel Janassova
- Preceded by: Oljas Bektenov
- Succeeded by: Roman Sklyar

Personal details
- Born: Aibek Arkabaevich Dadebayev; 1 April 1980 (age 46) Alma-Ata, Kazakh SSR, Soviet Union
- Party: Adilet (since 2026)
- Education: Kazakh Ablai Khan University of International Relations and World Languages

Aibek Arqabaiūly Dädebai (Note: Often transliterated as Aibek Arkabaiuly Dadebay through a Russified Romanization of Айбек Аркабайулы Дадебай.) (Note: Kazakh: Айбек Арқабайұлы Дәдебай) (né Dadebayev; born 1 April 1980) is a Kazakh politician and diplomat who has served as the member and the chairman of the Kurultai since 2026. He is also chairman of the ruling party Ädilet. Previously, he worked as Aqorda Chief of Staff under Kassym-Jomart Tokayev's Administration from 2024 to 2026.

== Early life and family ==
Aibek Arqabaiūly Dädebai was born in Almaty, Soviet Kazakhstan on 1 April 1980.

His grandfather, Dadebai Baikonusov (1883 or 1888 – 1958), was a livestock breeder. In 1948, for raising 50 foals from 50 mares, he was awarded the title Hero of Socialist Labour, together with the Order of Lenin and the Gold "Hammer and Sickle" medal.

Aibek's father, Arkabai Dadebaev, (Note: Dadebai Baikonusov's sons use the surname "Dadebayev" which is formed from their father's name.) is an Arabist philologist and co‑author of an Arabic–Kazakh dictionary and nephew, Jankara Dadebaev (born 1948), is a Doctor of Philological Sciences, professor, and academician.

Aibek Dädebai has diplomatic rank of 2nd class Advisor.

== Career ==
In 2001, Dädebai graduated from the Kazakh Ablai Khan University of International Relations and World Languages with a degree in international documentation and subsequently taught at the university's Department of International Tourism Management. In 2003, he completed a master's degree in regional studies at the same university. Information regarding his career between 2003 and 2008 is not listed in his official biography.

From 2008 to 2011, Dädebai worked in the Apparatus of the Senate of Kazakhstan as an expert in the Department of Inter-Parliamentary Relations and International Cooperation, as well as an acting assistant to the Senate speaker, Kassym-Jomart Tokayev. In 2011, after Tokayev was appointed Director-General of the United Nations Office at Geneva, Dädebai joined the Permanent Mission of Kazakhstan to the UN in Geneva, serving first as an attaché and later as third secretary. Following Tokayev's return to Kazakhstan and re-election as Senate Chairman in 2013, Dädebai served in the Senate Secretariat as deputy head and subsequently head until 2019.

After Nursultan Nazarbayev resigned as president and Tokayev assumed office in 2019, Dädebai was appointed deputy head of the president's Directorate.

On 28 May 2021, by order of the President, Dädebai was appointed Deputy Head of the Presidential Administration of Kazakhstan.

On 11 January 2022, after Kazakh unrest, by Presidential Decree No. 762 Aibek Dadebai was appointed Head of the Presidential Administration of Kazakhstan.

On 6 February 2024, after Oljas Bektenov became prime minister, by order of the President Tokayev, Dadebai was appointed Aqorda Chief of Staff. On 5 May, 2026, by Tokayev’s decree he was relieved of his post.

On 7 May 2026, at the founding congress of the new Ädilet, Dadebai was elected as its chairman.

After the 2026 Kazakh legislative election, Dädebai was elected to the newly-created unicameral Kurultai of Kazakhstan. On its first working meeting on 28 August, he was elected Chairman of the Kurultai.

== Awards ==
- Order of the Leopard 3rd degree (17 March 2026)
- Order of Friendship (2025, Kyrgyzstan)
- Order of Kurmet
- Medal for Distinguished Labor.
