= Aibek Smadiarov =

Kazakh politician

- Айбек Смадияров
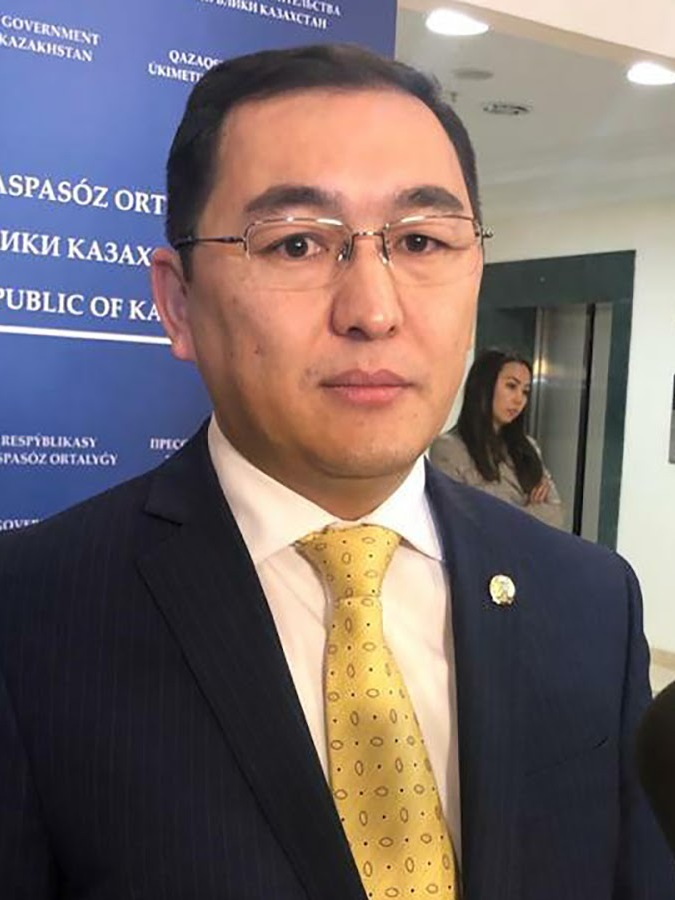
- Smadiarov in c. 2020

Aqorda Press Secretary
- Incumbent
- Assumed office 29 January 2026
- President: Kassym-Jomart Tokayev
- Preceded by: Ruslan Jeldibai

Advisor to the President
- Incumbent
- Assumed office 29 January 2026
- President: Kassym-Jomart Tokayev

Press Secretary of the Ministry of Foreign Affairs
- In office 15 June 2018 – 9 December 2025

Personal details
- Born: 7 July 1983 (age 43) South Kazakhstan Region, Kazakh SSR, Soviet Union
- Children: 3
- Education: Kazakh Ablai Khan University of International Relations and World Languages
- Awards: People's Gratitude medal

Aibek Serıkbaiūly Smadiarov (Note: Often transliterated as Aybek Serikbayevich Smadiyarov through a Russified Romanization of Айбек Серикбаевич Смадияров.) (Kazakh: Айбек Серікбайұлы Смадияров; born 7 July 1983) is a Kazakh journalist and diplomat serving as the Aqorda Press Secretary and advisor to the president since 2026.

== Early life and education ==
Smadiarov was born in South Kazakhstan Region, Kazakh Soviet Socialist Republic, Soviet Union (now Turkistan Region, Kazakhstan) on 7 July 1983.

In 2004, he graduated from the Kazakh Ablai Khan University of International Relations and World Languages, specializing in international documentation.

He later completed courses for young diplomats offered by the Turkish Ministry of Foreign Affairs; training for ambassadors and heads of structural divisions of the Kazakh Ministry of Foreign Affairs; a program for civil servants on “Investment Attractiveness of the Republic of Kazakhstan and Its Components”; and advanced training courses under the norms of Kazakhstan's Administrative Procedure Code.

== Career ==
In 2005, he worked in the Bank of China in Kazakhstan as a specialist in the Department of Administration.

In 2006, he joined the Kazakh Ministry of Foreign Affairs as a specialist in the Consular Service Department. From 2008 to 2010, he served as attaché and third secretary in the Europe Department. From 2010 to 2012, he was third secretary at the Embassy of Kazakhstan in Hungary.

In 2012, he joined the Presidential Administration's Press Service as an expert.

In 2013, he returned to the MFA, serving as secretary of the Committee for Foreign Policy Analysis and Forecasting. From 2014 to 2018, he was second and first secretary at the Embassy of Kazakhstan in Vietnam.

On 15 June 2018, he was appointed Press Secretary of the MFA. He also held positions as head of the Press Service, deputy head of the International Information Committee, head of the Communication Department, and head of the International Information Committee.

On 15 December 2025, by Tokayev's decree, he was appointed head of the Department of Internal Policy in the Presidential Administration.

On 29 January 2026, he was appointed presidential advisor and, additionally, Press Secretary of the President.

== Personal life ==
Smadiarov is married and has three daughters and son. Also he speaks Russian, English and Turkish, in addition to his native Kazakh.

== Honors and awards ==
- People's Gratitude medal (2021).
- Medal "25th anniversary of the diplomatic service of the Republic of Kazakhstan" (2017).
- Badge "Best Press Secretary of the Year" (2019).
- Medal "30th anniversary of the diplomatic service of the Republic of Kazakhstan" (2022).

Smadiarov holds the diplomatic rank of Ambassador Extraordinary and Plenipotentiary 2nd class.
