= Chistoy Banki =

Chistoy Banki Остров Чистой Банки Чистая Банка
- Island
- Interactive map of Chistoy Banki
- Location within Caspian Sea
- Coordinates: 45°12′N 48°01′E
- Country: Russia
- Oblast: Astrakhan Oblast

Chistoy Banki or Chistaya Banka is an island in the Caspian Sea. It is located off the mouths of the Volga, 27 km south of the southern tip of Zyudev Island.

Chistoy Banki Island has a length of 6 km and a maximum width of 4 km.

Administratively this island belongs to the Astrakhan Oblast of the Russian Federation.
