= Gadilbek Shalakhmetov =

Kazakh journalist and politician (1943–2024)

Ğadılbek Şalahmetov
- Ғаділбек Шалахметов

Member of the Mäjilis
- In office 3 November 2004 – 20 June 2007

Personal details
- Born: Gadilbek Minazhevich Shalakhmetov; 9 June 1943 Chistoy Banki, Astrakhan Oblast, Russian SFSR, USSR
- Died: 3 April 2024 (aged 80) Almaty, Kazakhstan
- Education: Kazakh Polytechnic Institute; High Courses for Scriptwriters and Film Directors
- Occupation: Journalist

Ğadılbek Mınajūly Şalahmetov (Note: Often transliterated as Gadilbek Minazhevich Shalakhmetov through a Russified Romanization of Гадилбек Минажевич Шалахметов.) (Kazakh: Ғаділбек Мінажұлы Шалахметов; 9 June 1943 – 3 April 2024) was a Kazakh journalist and politician. He served in the Mäjilis from 2004 to 2007.

Shalakhmetov died in Almaty on 3 April 2024, at the age of 80.
