= Karamergen =

Coordinates: 46°15′17″N 75°37′34″E

Karamergen is a medieval Kazakh settlement, located on the shore of Lake Balkhash in southeast Kazakhstan.

== History ==
In the first information about the existence of the ruins of ancient cities on the southern shore of Lake Balkhash belong to the end of the XIX century. In the 1960s, under the leadership of Kimal Akishev, K. M. Baypakov, and L. B. Yerzakovich, archaeological research was conducted on the settlement. The Karamergen settlement dates back to the IX-XIII century and is identified with the city of Gorguz. A medieval caravan route passed through the cities of the southern Balkhash region, in the lower reaches of Ili, along the Ortasu channel (or. Ili), where the remains of the cities of Karamergen, Aktam, and Agashayak were found. The route then went to the shore of Balkhash, and along the Uzun-Aral Peninsula, which almost connects the southern and Northern shores of the lake, leaving a strait a little more than 8 km wide.

== Description ==
The settlement is rectangular (115 x 120 m), with walls three meters in height. At each of the four corners are round, strongly protruding outward towers 4.5 meters high. The northeastern and southwestern sides have round towers 3.5 meters high. Entrances to the settlement can be traced in the middle of the northwestern and southeastern walls. The complex is flanked by an L-shaped section of the wall, at the corners of which there are two more towers, and the southeastern entrance is strengthened by an outrigger shaft, at a height of 1.5 meters. 20 meters to the east of the south tower is a trapezoidal structure, surrounded by a half-meter-high rampart. On the southeastern side of the settlement, at a distance of approximately 1 kilometer, there is a main channel, which was taken out of the bed of one of the channels of the now waterless Ortasu river. Pottery from the excavations dates back to the IX-XIII centuries. These artifacts include cauldrons, water-bearing jugs, mugs, bowls, and large vessels for storing water, grain and flour. In addition to irrigated agriculture, hunting in the tugai forests (where Turan tigers were found), as well as fishing in the waters of the Ili river and lake Balkhash, played an important role in the life of the citizens of Karamergen.

== Location ==
The settlement is located in the Almaty region of the Balkhash district, on the Bank of the dry Ortasu branch in Shet-Bakanas, on the territory of the saryesik-Atyrau desert, 200 kilometers northeast of the village of Bakanas.

== Preservation of the monument ==
The monument is under state protection, and is included in the State list of historical and cultural monuments of national significance in 2015. It is included in the UNESCO World Heritage list as part of the Semirechensk section of the serial nomination of monuments of the Great Silk Road. There is no physical protection of the monument in place.

== Sources of information about the monument ==
- Baypakov K. M., Yerzakovich L. B. Ancient cities of Kazakhstan. Alma-ATA, 1971.
- Baypakov K., Voyakin D. Kazakhstan section of the silk road. Almaty. 2012.
