= Anti-Corruption Service of the National Security Committee (Kazakhstan) =

Anti-Corruption Service of the National Security Committee of the Republic of Kazakhstan Қазақстан Республикасы Ұлттық қауіпсіздік комитетінің Сыбайлас жемқорлыққа қарсы іс-қимыл қызметі (Kazakh) Служба по противодействию коррупции Комитета национальной безопасности Республики Казахстан (Russian)
- The emblem of The National Security Committee

- Flag of the National Security Committee

Agency overview
- Formed: June 30, 2025
- Preceding agency: Anti-Corruption Agency

Jurisdictional structure
- Operations jurisdiction: Kazakhstan Kazakhstan

Operational structure
- Headquarters: 010000, Seifullin St., 37, Astana
- Agency executive: Nurjan Kussainov, Head of Service
- Parent agency: National Security Committee

The Anti-Corruption Service of the National Security Committee of the Republic of Kazakhstan (Kazakh: Қазақстан Республикасы Ұлттық қауіпсіздік комитетінің Сыбайлас жемқорлыққа қарсы іс-қимыл қызметі; Russian: Служба по противодействию коррупции Комитета национальной безопасности Республики Казахстан) is a specialized agency within the National Security Committee, created in 2025 through the reorganization of the Anti-Corruption Agency. It is responsible for detecting, preventing, uncovering and investigating corruption offences.

== History ==
=== Tax Police Committee (1999 – 2001) ===
On May 6, 1999, by president of Kazakhstan Nursultan Nazarbayev's decree No. 82, the Tax Police Committee under the Finance ministry was established to replace abolished departments of Finance ministry and the Internal Affairs ministry. The Committee was tasked with preventing, detecting and investigating tax evasion and other economic offences, developing policy in this area, and cooperating with foreign partners.

=== Financial Police Agency (2001 – 2003) ===
On January 22, 2001, by Nazarbayev's decree, the Tax Police Committee of the Finance ministry and the Tax Police Academy of the State Revenues ministry were incorporated into the newly created Financial Police Agency to prevent and suppress violations in the economic and financial spheres.

=== Agency for Combating Economic and Corruption Crimes (2003 – 2014) ===
On December 23, 2003, the Financial Police Agency was abolished and replaced by the Agency for Combating Economic and Corruption Crimes (Financial Police), to which the investigative powers of the Internal Affairs ministry in relation to economic and corruption crimes were transferred. The new Agency was initially subordinate to the Government and, from February 25, 2005, to the president.

=== Agency for Civil Service Affairs and Anti-Corruption (2014 – 2015) ===
On August 6, 2014 the Agency for Combating Economic and Corruption Crimes and the Agency for Civil Service Affairs were merged into the Agency for Civil Service Affairs and Anti-Corruption.

=== National Bureau for Anti-Corruption of the Civil Service Affairs ministry (2015 – 2016) ===
On December 11, 2015, that agency was reorganised into the Ministry of Civil Service Affairs, and the National Bureau for Anti-Corruption was established within it.

=== Agency for Civil Service Affairs and Anti-Corruption (2016 – 2019) ===
On September 13, 2016, the Ministry was again transformed into the Agency for Civil Service Affairs and Anti-Corruption, and the National Bureau was returned to its structure.

=== Anti-Corruption Agency (2019 – 2025) ===
On June 13, 2019, by president Kassym-Jomart Tokayev's decree, the National Bureau was separated from the Agency and reorganised as the Anti-Corruption Agency, subordinate to the president.

=== Anti-Corruption Service of the National Security Committee (2025 – ) ===
On June 30, 2025, the Anti-Corruption Agency was incorporated into the National Security Committee and became the Anti-Corruption Service of the National Security Committee.

== Function ==
- Detecting, preventing, uncovering and conducting pre-trial investigations of corruption offences.
- Developing proposals for the formulation and implementation of national anti‑corruption policy.
- Cooperating with state bodies and other anti‑corruption actors.
- The Service is authorised to act on behalf of the state in civil‑law matters.
- Ensure that Service personnel comply with anti‑corruption legislation.
- Submit proposals to state bodies and organisations to eliminate the causes and conditions that facilitate corruption.

=== Powers of the agency ===
- Request and receive, in the prescribed manner, necessary information from individuals and legal entities.
- Conduct operational-search activities and apply procedural coercive measures within the framework of investigations.
- Engage specialists and experts to carry out examinations when corruption is detected.

== See also ==
- Anti-Corruption Agency of the Republic of Kazakhstan
- Corruption in Kazakhstan
