= Murat Nurtileu =

Kazakh diplomat and politician

- Мұрат Нұртілеу
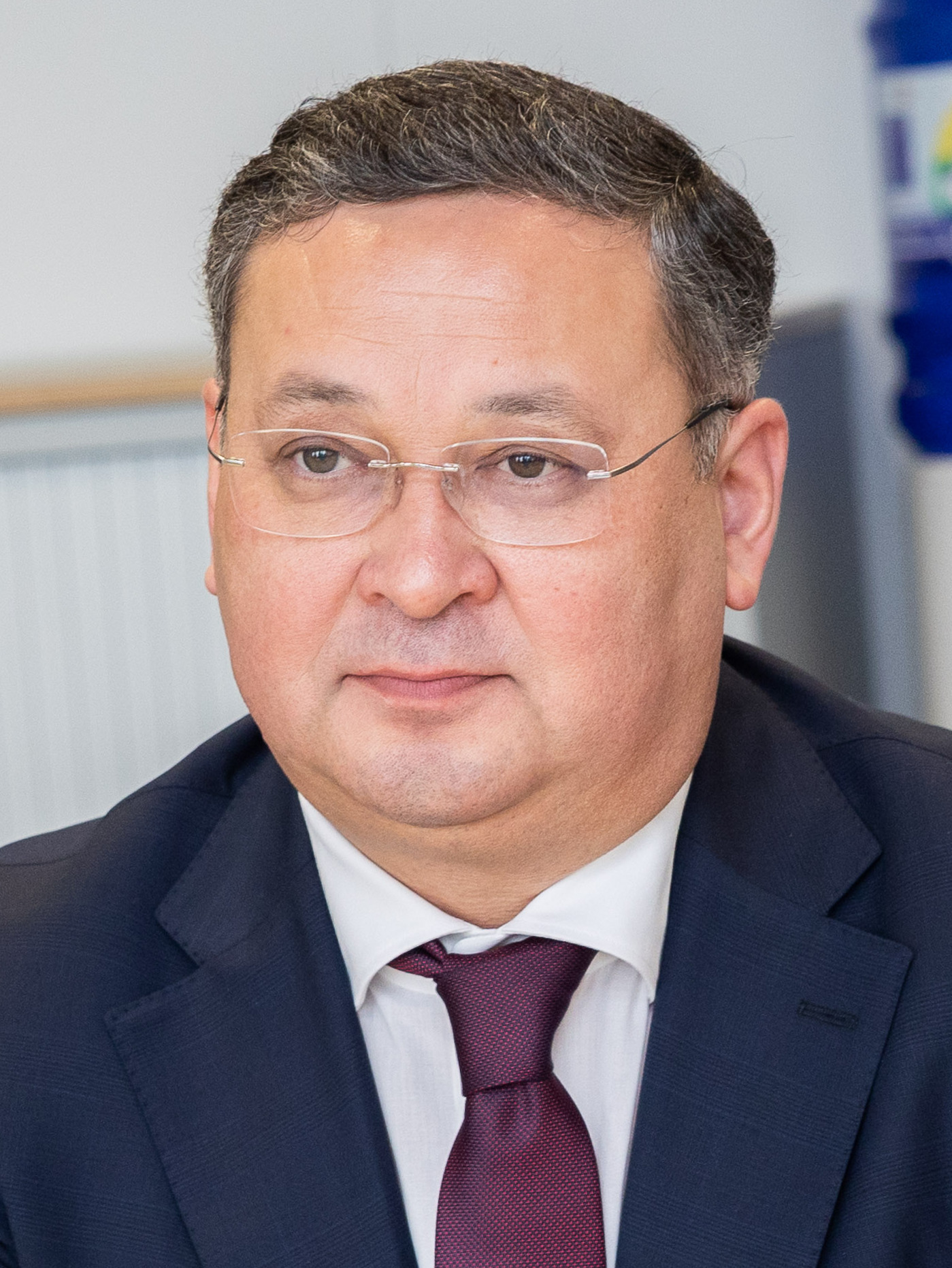
- Nurtileu in 2023

Assistant to the President for International Investment and Trade Cooperation
- Incumbent
- Assumed office 26 September 2025
- President: Kassym-Jomart Tokayev
- Preceded by: position established

Deputy Prime Minister
- In office 3 April 2023 – 26 September 2025
- President: Kassym-Jomart Tokayev
- Prime Minister: Älihan Smaiylov; Oljas Bektenov
- Preceded by: Mūhtar Tıleuberdı

Minister of Foreign Affairs
- In office 3 April 2023 – 26 September 2025
- President: Kassym-Jomart Tokayev
- Prime Minister: Älihan Smaiylov; Oljas Bektenov
- Preceded by: Mūhtar Tıleuberdı
- Succeeded by: Ermek Köşerbaev

Aqorda Chief of Staff
- In office 1 February 2022 – 3 April 2023
- President: Kassym-Jomart Tokayev
- Preceded by: Erlan Qoşanov
- Succeeded by: Oljas Bektenov

Assistant to the President
- In office 24 March 2019 – 25 February 2021
- President: Kassym-Jomart Tokayev

Ambassador of Kazakhstan to Estonia
- In office 22 February 2017 – 24 March 2019
- President: Kassym-Jomart Tokayev
- Preceded by: Ğalymjan Qoişybaev
- Succeeded by: Janna Sartbaeva

Ambassador of Kazakhstan to Finland
- In office 29 March 2016 – 24 March 2019
- President: Kassym-Jomart Tokayev
- Preceded by: Ğalymjan Qoişybaev
- Succeeded by: Nurlan Seytimov

Personal details
- Born: 11 March 1976 (age 50) Almaty, Kazakh SSR, Soviet Union
- Children: 4
- Education: Al-Farabi Kazakh National University
- Awards: Order of Kurmet

Mūrat Äbuğaliūly Nūrtıleu (Kazakh: Мұрат Әбуғалиұлы Нұртілеу; born 11 March 1976) is a Kazakh politician and diplomat, who is currently serving as assistant to the President for International Investment and Trade Cooperation since 2025. He served as the Deputy Prime Minister and concurrently Minister of Foreign Affairs from 2023 to 2025.

== Early life and career ==
Murat Nurtileu was born on March 11, 1976, in Almaty, Soviet Kazakhstan. He graduated from Kazakh National University with a degree in International Relations in 1998. He speaks fluent Kazakh, Russian, English, and German.

From 1998 to 2007, he held various positions in the Ministry of Foreign Affairs of Kazakhstan.

From 2007 to 2011, he first served as deputy chairman, then as Chairman of the Apparatus of the Senate of Kazakhstan.

In 2011, he returned to the Ministry of Foreign Affairs as Ambassador-at-large. In the same year, he was appointed as Director of Foreign Ministry's Asia and Africa department. Between 2011 and 2014, Murat Nurtileu served as Minister Counselor at the Permanent Mission of Kazakhstan to the United Nations and other international organizations in Geneva (Swiss Confederation).

From 2014 to 2016, he worked as Deputy Head of the Center for Foreign Policy of the Presidential Administration.

He then served as Kazakhstan's Extraordinary and Plenipotentiary Ambassador to Finland, and concurrently as Ambassador to Estonia between 2016 and 2019.

Murat Nurtileu was appointed as Aide to the President of Kazakhstan in March 2019. He then served as Deputy Chief of Staff of the President between 2021 and 2022. In January 2022, Murat Nurtleu was appointed First Deputy Chairman of the National Security Committee. He then served as Chief of Staff of the President of Kazakhstan from 2022 to 2023.

On April 3, 2023, by the Decree of the President, he was appointed Deputy Prime Minister – Minister of Foreign Affairs of Kazakhstan.

On September 4, 2025, ORDA reported that Nurtleu had been detained. However, this information was immediately refuted by the Center for Combating Disinformation of the Central Communications Service. On 8 September 2025 before the President's State of the Nation Address to the People of Kazakhstan, when he entered the building, he denied the information to journalists.

On 26 September 2025, Kassym-Jomart Tokayev Nurtileu appointed assistant to the President for International Investment and Trade Cooperation by Decree No. 1012.

== Personal life ==
Nurtileu is married and has four children.

== Awards ==
- Order of Kurmet
