= Chairman of the Kurultai =

Speaker of Kazakhstan's parliament

- Құрылтай төрағасы (Kazakh); председатель Курултая (Russian)
- Emblem of Kazakhstan

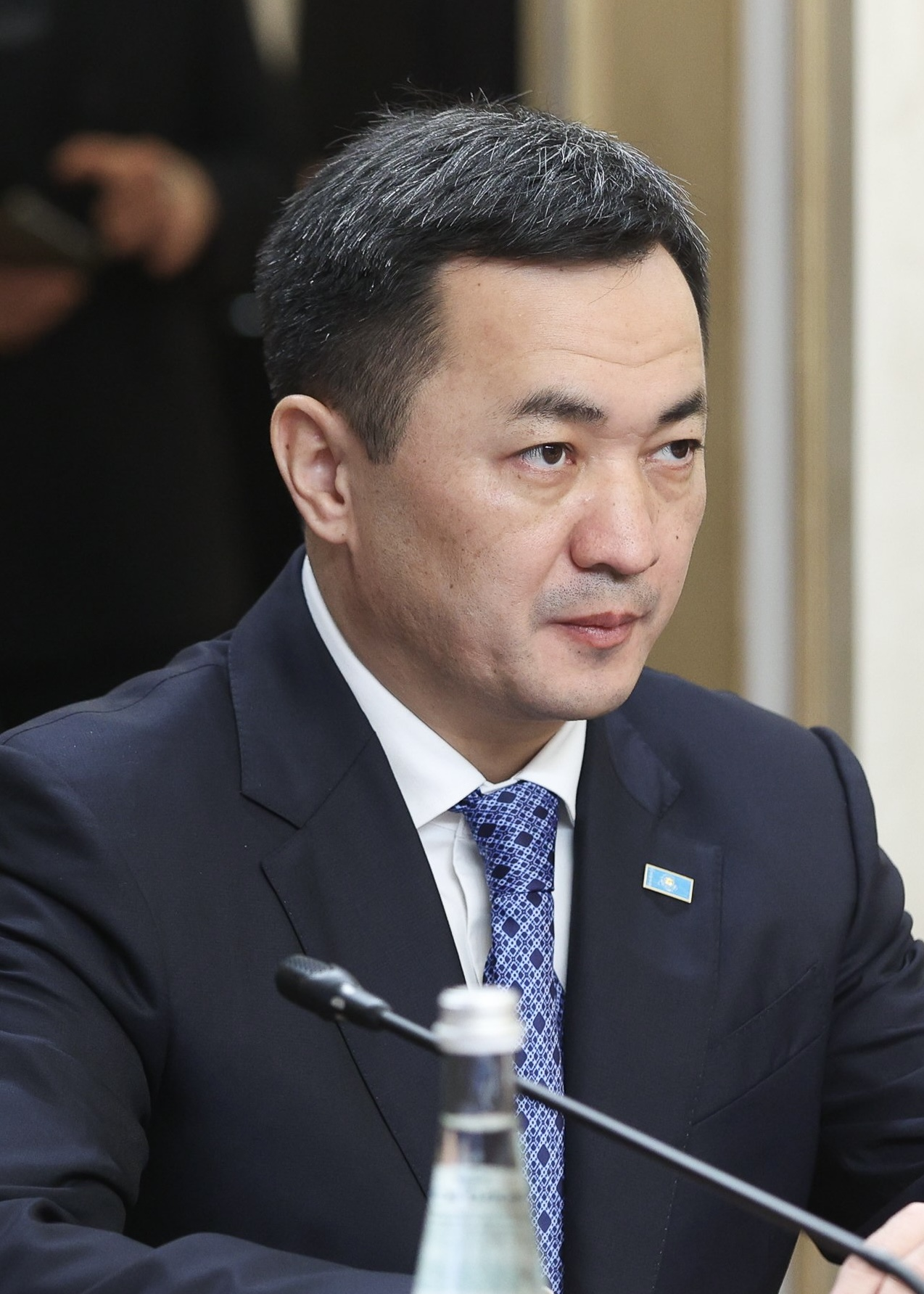
- Incumbent; Aibek Dädebai since 28 August 2026
- Nominator: President of Kazakhstan
- Appointer: Kurultai members
- Term length: 5 years; renewable
- Precursor: Chairman of the Senate; Chairman of the Mäjilis
- Formation: 1 July 2026
- First holder: Aibek Dädebai
- Deputy: Deputy Chairman

The chairman of the Kurultai of the Republic of Kazakhstan (Note: Kazakh: Қазақстан Республикасы Құрылтайының төрағасы; Qazaqstan Respublikasy Qūryltaiynyñ törağasy; IPA: [qɑzɑɣ(ɯ)sˈtʰɑn rʲɪˈspublʲɪkäˈsɯ qo̙rɯɫtʰɑˈjɯˈnɯŋ tʰøræ.ɣɑsɯ]; Russian: председатель Курултая Республики Казахстан; predsedatel Kurultaya Respubliki Kazakhstan; IPA: [prʲɪt͡sʲsʲɪˈdatʲɪlʲ kʊrʊɫˈtajə rʲɪˈspublʲɪkʲɪ kɐzɐxˈstan]) is the parliamentary speaker of Kazakhstan's unicameral legislature, the Kurultai.

== History ==
=== Establishment ===
After Kazakhstan gained independence in 1991, the country adopted a new constitutional framework in 1995 establishing a bicameral Parliament of Kazakhstan consisting of the Senate and the Mäjilis. This system functioned as the national legislature until its dissolution in 2026, when a new Constitution came into force following a nationwide referendum.

The first election of the Kurultai took place on 23 August 2026. Following it is the election of the body's first Chair.

== Appointment ==
The chairman is elected by a secret ballot from among the Members of Parliament who are fluent in the Kazakh language by a majority vote of the total number. The president of Kazakhstan nominates the chairman; if the Kurultai refuses to elect the chairman twice, the president has the right to dissolve the Kurultai. The chairman may be terminated from their post by the Kurultai members.

== Duties and powers ==
The chairman presides over and calls all the sessions of Parliament. They also lead the Bureau of the Kurultai and cast the tie-breaker vote.

The first session of the Kurultai is typically opened by the president of Kazakhstan. In other cases, this is reserved to the chairman.

== Deputies ==
The three deputy chairmen of the Kurultai are elected by the members of the Kurultai, and their candidacies are proposed by the chairmen themselves.

Before the chairman is elected, the Kurultai is presided over by the chairman of the Central Election Commission.

== List ==
| No. | Portrait | Name (Birth–Death) | Term of office | | | Election | Political party | Convocation |
| No. | Portrait | Name (Birth–Death) | Took office | Left office | Time in office | Election | Political party | Convocation |
|---|---|---|---|---|---|---|---|---|
| 1 | | Aibek Dädebai (born 1980) | 28 August 2026 | Incumbent | 1 month and 25 days | 2026 | Ädilet | 1st |
