= Bakanas =

Bakanas Бақанас
- Village
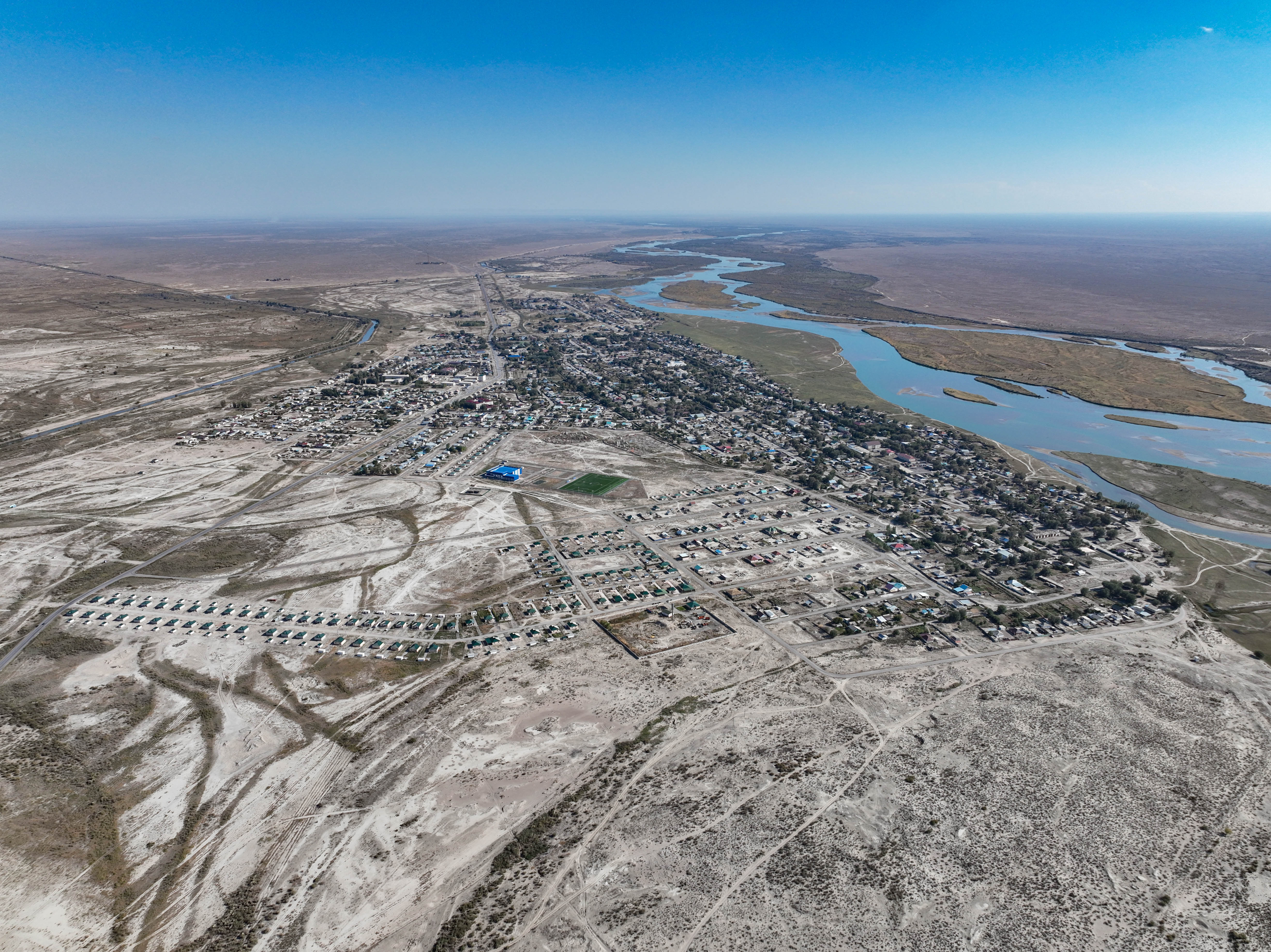
- Aerial view of Bakanas

- Location in Kazakhstan Bakanas (Asia)
- Coordinates: 44°49′19″N 76°16′4″E
- Country: Kazakhstan
- Region: Almaty Region
- District: Balkhash District

Population (2009)
  - Total: 5,004
- Time zone: UTC+6 (Omsk Time)
- Postal code: 040300
- Area code: 72773

Bakanas (Kazakh: Бақанас, Baqanas) is a village in Kazakhstan, the regional center of Balkhash district of Almaty region. The administrative center of the Bakanas rural district. The Bakanas is the final pier on the banks of the Ili river. To the North of Bakanas began the ancient delta of the Ili - Bakanas river of the same name. Now it is the territory of the Saryesik - Atyrau desert. At the village begins the world's northernmost massif - Akdalinsk, laid out in the 1970s.

The Bakanas canal irrigates rice fields. The Bakanas village is a popular destination for fishermen, hunters, and archaeologists who study the ancient settlements of the Ili Delta — Aktam and Karamergen. The Bakanas has a branch of the Institute of botany and Phytointroduction, a Botanical garden.

== Museum ==
The local history museum opened based on the decision of the Akim of Almaty region in 2003. The museum's collection contains 1,804 items of significance. The museum exhibits materials of heroes of labor and war, personal belongings of D.A. Kunaev, items of flora and fauna and the history of the district.

== Climate ==
Climate data for Bakanas (1991–2020)
| Month | Jan | Feb | Mar | Apr | May | Jun | Jul | Aug | Sep | Oct | Nov | Dec | Year |
|---|---|---|---|---|---|---|---|---|---|---|---|---|---|
| Mean daily maximum °C (°F) | −3.9 (25.0) | −0.2 (31.6) | 9.7 (49.5) | 20.3 (68.5) | 26.6 (79.9) | 32.0 (89.6) | 33.6 (92.5) | 32.2 (90.0) | 26.1 (79.0) | 17.7 (63.9) | 6.9 (44.4) | −1.6 (29.1) | 16.6 (61.9) |
| Daily mean °C (°F) | −9.8 (14.4) | −6.2 (20.8) | 2.9 (37.2) | 12.4 (54.3) | 18.6 (65.5) | 24.2 (75.6) | 25.9 (78.6) | 23.9 (75.0) | 17.3 (63.1) | 9.5 (49.1) | 0.6 (33.1) | −6.7 (19.9) | 9.4 (48.9) |
| Mean daily minimum °C (°F) | −14.6 (5.7) | −11.1 (12.0) | −2.6 (27.3) | 5.1 (41.2) | 10.4 (50.7) | 16.1 (61.0) | 18.0 (64.4) | 15.5 (59.9) | 9.2 (48.6) | 2.7 (36.9) | −4.0 (24.8) | −11.0 (12.2) | 2.8 (37.0) |
| Average precipitation mm (inches) | 14.2 (0.56) | 14.5 (0.57) | 14.8 (0.58) | 17.4 (0.69) | 21.9 (0.86) | 18.5 (0.73) | 16.8 (0.66) | 9.0 (0.35) | 7.4 (0.29) | 17.7 (0.70) | 21.7 (0.85) | 16.8 (0.66) | 190.7 (7.51) |
| Average precipitation days (≥ 1.0 mm) | 4.0 | 4.3 | 3.5 | 4.0 | 4.3 | 3.6 | 3.6 | 1.9 | 1.8 | 3.3 | 4.9 | 4.5 | 43.7 |
Source: NOAA

== Source and links ==
1. Bakanas
