= Anti-Corruption Agency of the Republic of Kazakhstan =

State anti-corruption body of Kazakhstan

- Қазақстан Республикасының Сыбайлас жемқорлыққа қарсы іс-қимыл Агенттігі (Kazakh); Агентство Республики Казахстан по противодействию коррупции (Russian)
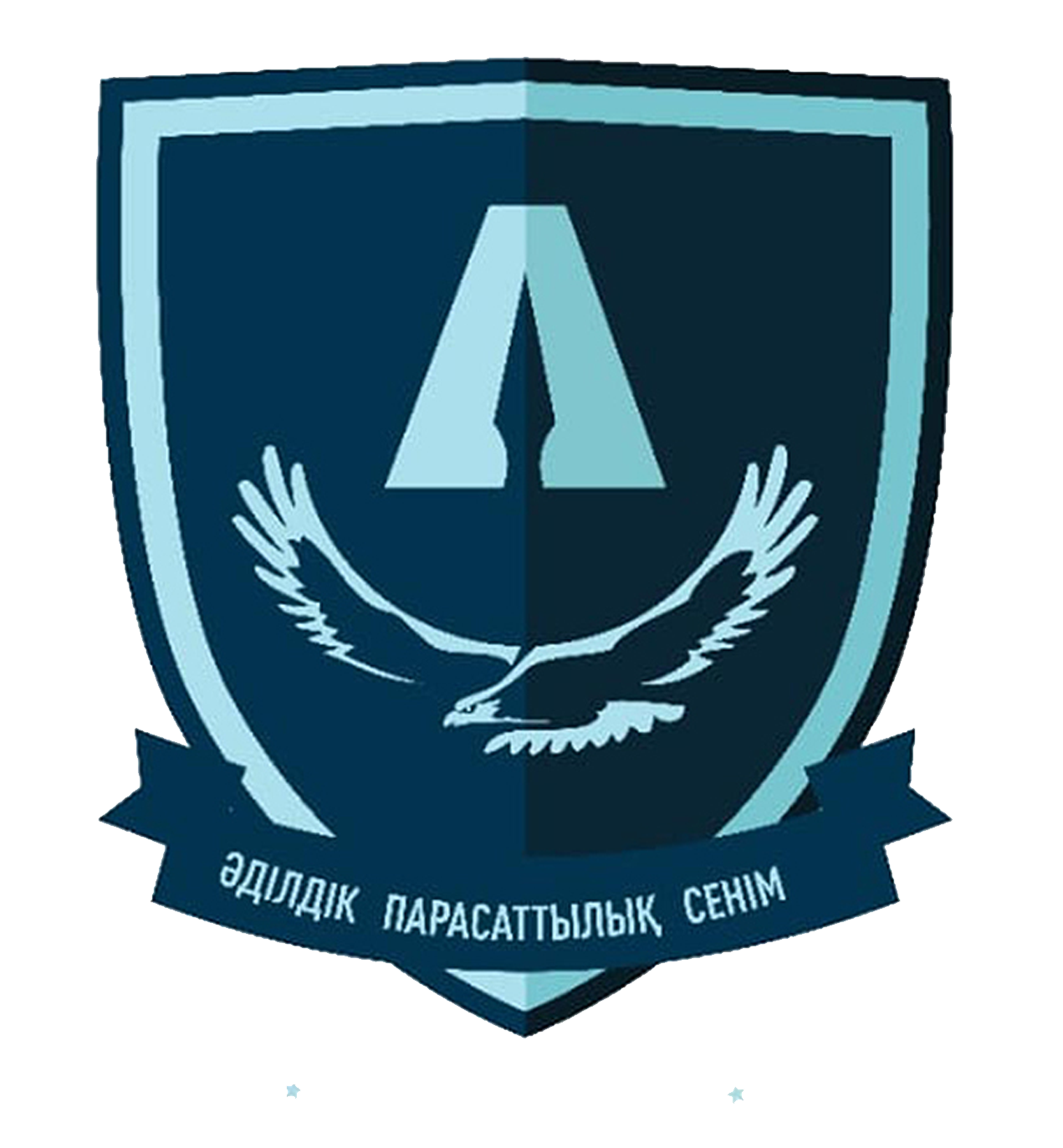

Agency overview
- Formed: 13 June 2019
- Preceding agency: Agency for Civil Service Affairs and Anti-Corruption (National Anti-Corruption Bureau)
- Dissolved: 30 June 2025
- Superseding agency: Anti-Corruption Service of the National Security Committee
- Type: Anti-corruption agency
- Jurisdiction: Kazakhstan
- Headquarters: 010000, Seifullin St., 37, Astana

The Anti-Corruption Agency of the Republic of Kazakhstan (Note: Kazakh: Қазақстан Республикасының Сыбайлас жемқорлыққа қарсы іс-қимыл Агенттігі, romanized: Qazaqstan Respublikasynyñ sybailas jemqorlyqqa qarsy ıs-qimyl Agenttıgı; Russian: Агентство Республики Казахстан по противодействию коррупции, romanized: Agentstvo Respubliki Kazahstan po protivodejstviju korrupcii) (Anticor) was a state anti-corruption body directly subordinate and accountable to the president of Kazakhstan, which is responsible for the formation and implementation of anti-corruption policy of Kazakhstan and coordination in the field of anti-corruption, as well as identification, suppression, disclosure and investigation of corruption offenses and other functions in accordance with the legislation of Kazakhstan. On June 30, 2025, by decree of president Kassym-Jomart Tokayev the Anti‑Corruption Service was incorporated into the National Security Committee as its Anti‑Corruption Service.

== History ==
On 6 August 2014, according to the Decree of the President of the Republic of Kazakhstan No. 883 "On measures on further improvement of state administration system of Kazakhstan" was established the Agency of the Republic of Kazakhstan for civil service Affairs and anti-corruption. Instead of the liquidated Agency of the Republic of Kazakhstan for combating economic and corruption crime.

On 11 December 2015, the Ministry of public service Affairs of the Republic of Kazakhstan was established as an authorized body in the field of public service and anti-corruption with the transfer of functions and powers to manage the property and Affairs of the abolished Agency of the Republic of Kazakhstan for public service and anti-corruption. The Agency was renamed the National Anti-Corruption Bureau.

On 13 September 2016, the Ministry of civil service Affairs of the Republic of Kazakhstan was reorganized into the Agency of the Republic of Kazakhstan for civil service Affairs and anti-corruption. The national anti-corruption Bureau had the status of an Agency in the structure of the anti-corruption Agency.

By Decree of the President of the Republic of Kazakhstan No. 12 from 13 June 2019 in order to further improve the system of state service and fighting corruption the National Bureau for anti-corruption (anti-corruption service) Agency of the Republic of Kazakhstan for civil service Affairs and anti-corruption transformed into the Agency of the Republic of Kazakhstan on combating corruption (anti-corruption service), as a state body directly subordinate and accountable to the President of the Republic of Kazakhstan.

In July 2025, Kazakh President Kassym-Jomart Tokayev dissolved the country’s standalone Anti-Corruption Agency and transferred its functions to the National Security Committee (NSC). According to reports, the move "provides for the transfer of the functions and powers of the restructured Anti-Corruption Agency relating to combat against corruption, formation and implementation of an anti-corruption policy, coordination in the field of anti-corruption, minimization of causes and conditions leading to corruption offenses as well as building an anti-corruption culture to the Agency of the Republic of Kazakhstan for Civil Service Affairs."

The Agency is a law enforcement Agency that develops and implements the anti-corruption policy of the Republic of Kazakhstan and coordinates the fight against corruption, as well as identifying, suppressing, disclosing and investigating corruption offenses.

== Ministerial awards ==
In accordance with the decree of the President of the Republic of Kazakhstan from 30 September 2011 No. 155 "About the state symbols and heraldry departmental and others, equated to them, awards of some state bodies, directly subordinate and accountable to the President of the Republic of Kazakhstan, constitutional Council of the Republic of Kazakhstan, law enforcement agencies, courts, Armed Forces, other troops and military formations" departmental awards Agency for anti-corruption (anti-corruption services) are considered:

- Medals:
  - "Minsiz kyzmet ushin" (for impeccable service) I, II, III degrees;
  - For their contribution to Law Enforcement .
- Breastplate:
  - "Uzdik kizmetker" (Excellent officer) I, II degree;
  - "Uzdik kyzmetshi" (Excellent employee) I, II degrees.
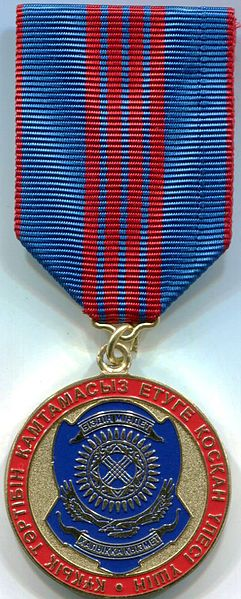

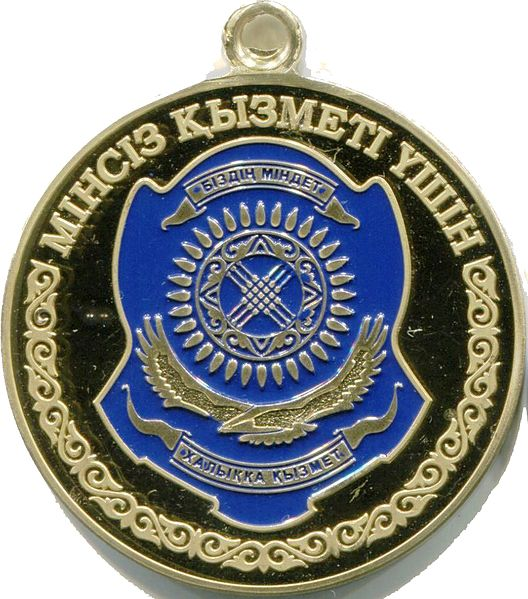

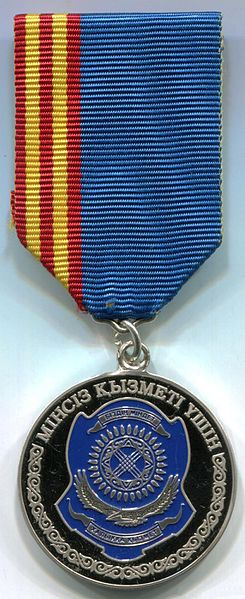
