= Zyudev Island =

Zyudev Island Зюдев
- Island
- Location within Caspian Sea
- Coordinates: 45°33′N 47°57′E
- Country: Russia
- Oblast: Astrakhan Oblast

Zyudev Island is an island in the Caspian Sea. It is located off the mouths of the Volga.

Zyudev Island is long and is aligned roughly north to south along a small coastal peninsula, separated from it by a 3 km (1.9 mi) wide channel. It has a length of 23 km (14 mi) and a maximum width of 5.5 km (3.4 mi).

Administratively, the island belongs to the Astrakhan Oblast of the Russian Federation.
