= Akdala =

Akdala Ақдала
- Village
- Location in Kazakhstan
- Coordinates: 43°19′40″N 77°12′03″E
- Country: Kazakhstan
- Region: Almaty Region
- District: Talgar District

Population (2009)
  - Total: 533
- Time zone: UTC+6 (Omsk Time)

Akdala (Kazakh: Ақдала, Aqdala) is an agricultural village in Almaty Region of south-eastern Kazakhstan. It is located to the north-west of Talgar. The village has a small lake located in the southern part. Extensive fields separate it from Talgar.
