= Roman Sklyar =

Kazakhstani politician (born 1971)

- Роман Скляр
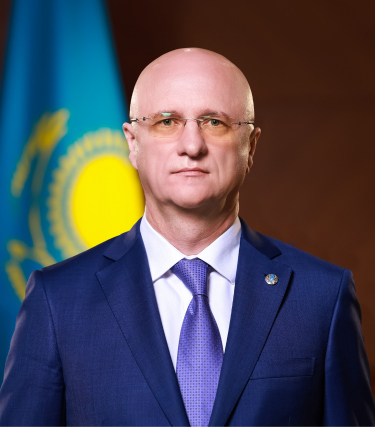
- Official portrait, c. 2023

Aqorda Chief of Staff
- Incumbent
- Assumed office 5 May 2026
- President: Kassym-Jomart Tokayev
- First deputy: Erlan Qarin
- Preceded by: Aybek Dädebay

First Deputy Prime Minister of Kazakhstan
- In office 11 January 2022 – 5 May 2026
- President: Kassym-Jomart Tokayev
- Prime Minister: Älihan Smaiylov; Himself (acting); Oljas Bektenov
- Preceded by: Älihan Smaiylov
- Succeeded by: Nurlybek Nalibaev

Acting Prime Minister of Kazakhstan
- In office 5 February – 6 February 2024
- President: Kassym-Jomart Tokayev
- Preceded by: Älihan Smaiylov
- Succeeded by: Oljas Bektenov

Minister of Industry and Infrastructure Development
- In office 25 February 2019 – 18 September 2019
- President: Nursultan Nazarbayev; Kassym-Jomart Tokayev
- Prime Minister: Askar Mamin
- Preceded by: Zhenis Kassymbek
- Succeeded by: Beibut Atamkulov

Member of the Mäjilis
- In office 25 March 2016 – 17 May 2016

Personal details
- Born: 8 May 1971 (age 55) Pavlodar, Pavlodar Region, Kazakh SSR, Soviet Union
- Party: Independent
- Other political affiliations: Amanat (until 2026)

Roman Vasilievich Sklyar (/roʊˈmɑːn skliˈɑːr/; Russian: Роман Васильевич Скляр, IPA: [rɐˈman vɐˈsʲilʲjɪvʲɪtɕ sklʲar]; born 8 May 1971) is a Kazakh politician and economist who's currently serving as the Aqorda Chief of Staff since 2026. From 2022 to 2026 he served as First Deputy Prime Minister. During his tenure, he was briefly the Acting Prime Minister of Kazakhstan in February 2024.

Sklyar was the deputy akim of Pavlodar from 2005 to 2006, deputy and first deputy akim of Pavlodar Region from 2008 to 2011, Vice Minister of Transport and Communications from 2011 to 2013, member of the Mäjilis and Vice Minister of National Economy in 2016, Vice and First Vice Minister for Investment and Development from 2016 to 2019, and Minister of Industry and Infrastructure Development in 2019.

== Early life and education ==
Sklyar was born in the city of Pavlodar. He graduated from the Pavlodar State University with a degree in Civil Engineering, Moscow Institute of Modern Business with a degree in Economics and the Kazakh Institute of Law and International Relations.

== Career ==
He began his career in 1989 as a fitter and installer at the Ekibastuzugleavtomatika MNU, and later worked as a safety engineer at Vakhinvest JV and in various commercial structures.

From 2005 to 2006, Sklyar held the posts of chief of staff, deputy akim of Pavlodar. From 2006 to 2007 he worked as head of the infrastructure development department of the apparatus of the akim of Astana. From 2007, he worked as the Director of the Department of Energy and Public Utilities of the city of Astana. From 2008 to 2011, he held the posts of deputy and first deputy akim of Pavlodar Region.

In May 2011, Sklyar became the Vice Minister of Transport and Communications. From 2014 to 2016 he worked as vice president of Kazakhstan Temir Zholy JSC.

In 20 March 2016 elections, Sklyar was elected to the Mäjilis from the Nur Otan party list where he served as Chairman of the Committee on Economic Reform and Regional Development. From May to December 2016 he worked as Vice Minister of the National Economy.

On 23 December 2016, Sklyar became the Vice Minister for Investment and Development. He was then the First Vice Minister from 18 January 2018. After the government of Bakhytjan Sagintayev was dismissed on 21 February 2019, Sklyar became the Minister of Industry and Infrastructure Development on 25 February under Prime minister Askar Mamin.

On 18 September 2019, he was appointed as the Deputy Prime Minister.

On 5 February 2024, the government of Älihan Smaiylov completely resigned. President Kassym-Jomart Tokayev appointed Sklyar as acting Prime Minister of Kazakhstan. He was replaced the next day by his duly-nominated successor, Oljas Bektenov.

On 5 May 2026, by Tokayev’s decree No. 1261, he was appointed Aqorda Chief of Staff (Head of the Presidential Administration).

== Personal life ==
He is married to Elena Melnik and has a son, Andrey. His brother, Vasily Sklyar, has served as the head of the Pavlodar Regional Police Department since 2022. He speaks Kazakh, Russian, English, and Chinese. He learned Kazakh having been sent to Zhana-Aul in his youth.

== Awards ==
Country	Date	Reward
Kazakhstan	2010	Knight of the Order of Kurmet
Kazakhstan	2017	Knight of the Order of Parasat
Kazakhstan	2011	Medal "20 Years of Independence of the Republic of Kazakhstan"
Kazakhstan	2008	Medal "10 years of Astana"
Supreme Eurasian Economic Council	May 29, 2019	Medal "For Contribution to the Development of the Eurasian Economic Union"
