= Aqorda Chief of Staff =

State position in Kazakhstan

- Flag of the President of Kazakhstan

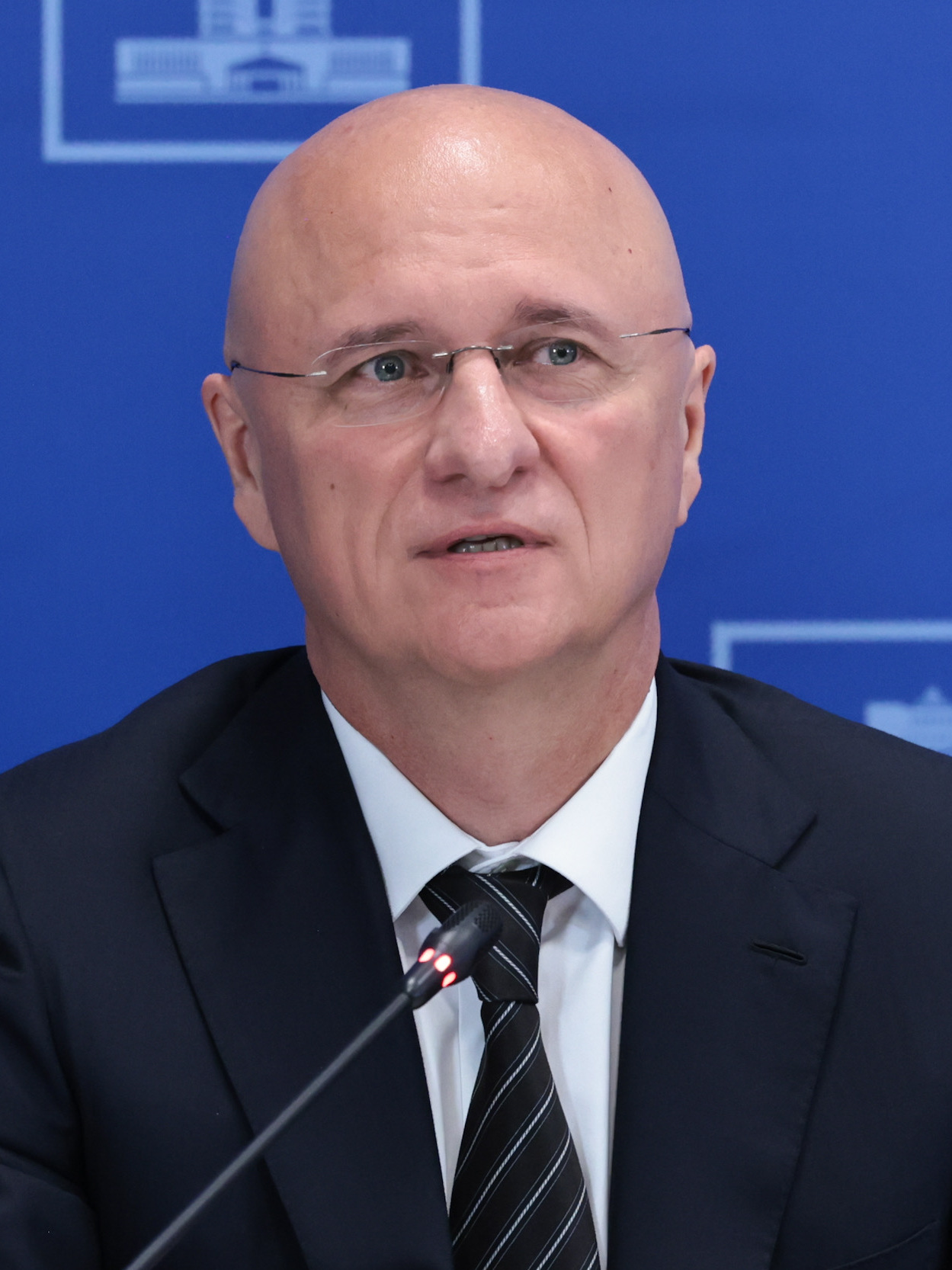
- Incumbent; Roman Sklyar since 5 May 2026
- Aqorda Residence; Presidential Administration of Kazakhstan
- Reports to: President of Kazakhstan
- Appointer: President of Kazakhstan
- Formation: 1990 (Chief of the Apparatus of the President); 1991 (Aqorda Chief of Staff)
- First holder: Nurtai Abykayev
- Website: www.akorda.kz

The Aqorda chief of staff (also Chief of Staff of the Presidential Executive Office of Kazakhstan, and Head of the Presidential Administration of Kazakhstan; Kazakh: Қазақстан президенті Әкімшілігінің басшысы, romanized: Qazaqstan Prezidentı Äkımşılıgınıñ basşysy) is a state position that leads the Presidential Administration of Kazakhstan, and is directly subordinate to the President. The position is appointed and dismissed by the President.

== History ==
The first steps in creating the Presidential Administration were taken even during the Soviet period. In August 1990, the Temporary Regulation on the Apparatus of the President of the Kazakh SSR was adopted, which served as a prototype for the future Presidential Administration.

After Kazakhstan proclaimed independence in 1991, the institution of the president was enshrined in the Constitution, and on 30 August 1995 a new Constitution was adopted one that remains in force to this day where the president is recognized as the president and the highest official of the country.

== Functions ==
- Develops and submits for approval to the President a draft Regulation on the Administration of the President, formulates recommendations for optimizing the structure and staffing levels of the apparatus, approves the staffing schedule and, if necessary, makes adjustments within the established limit of positions.
- Proposes to the President personnel decisions regarding the appointment and dismissal of assistants and advisors to the President, as well as heads of the Administration's structural units; independently appoints and dismisses apparatus employees within its competence.
- Ensures continuous institutional cooperation between the President's Administration and Parliament and its chambers, the Government and the Office of the Prime Minister, ministries, other central executive bodies, the Constitutional Court, the Supreme Court, the Prosecutor General's Office, the National Security Committee, structures subordinate and accountable to the President, the National Bank, the Supreme Audit Chamber, as well as local executive and representative bodies, political parties, public associations, mass media, and citizens.
- Approves internal regulations and normative acts governing the work of the Administration's units, as well as job descriptions and duties of apparatus employees.
- Oversees and coordinates the monitoring of the implementation of the President's decrees and instructions, and ensures the proper flow of official documents within the Administration.
- Provides overall leadership and coordination of the work of the President's assistants and advisors, coordinates the activities of all Administration units, directing their efforts toward achieving tasks set by the President and ensuring effective interaction with other state authorities.
- Prepares and presents to the President for consideration and signature laws approved by Parliament, as well as draft decrees, orders, and other official documents requiring his decision.
- Performs other tasks and functions assigned by the President.

== Officeholders ==
=== Chief of the Apparatus of the President of the Kazakh SSR / Kazakhstan (1990–1995) ===
#	Portrait	Name	Start	End	Source	President
1		Nurtai Abykayev	May 1990	October 1995		Nursultan Nazarbayev

=== Chief of Staff Presidential Executive Office (1995–) ===
#	Portrait	Name	Start	End	Source	President
1		Sağynbek Tursynov	October 1995	June 1996		Nursultan Nazarbayev (1990–2019)
–		Akhmedjan Essimov	June 1996	October 1996		Nursultan Nazarbayev (1990–2019)
2		Oralbai Äbdıkärımov	October 1996	October 1997		Nursultan Nazarbayev (1990–2019)
3		Sarybai Qalmyrzaev	October 1997	January 1998		Nursultan Nazarbayev (1990–2019)
–		Vladimir Shepel	January 1998	February 1998		Nursultan Nazarbayev (1990–2019)
4		Akhmedjan Essimov	February 1998	August 1998		Nursultan Nazarbayev (1990–2019)
5		Älihan Bäimenov	August 1998	February 1999		Nursultan Nazarbayev (1990–2019)
6		Sarybai Qalmyrzaev	February 1999	January 2002		Nursultan Nazarbayev (1990–2019)
7		Nurtai Abykayev	29 January 2002	10 March 2004		Nursultan Nazarbayev (1990–2019)
8		Imangali Tasmagambetov	10 March 2004	9 December 2004		Nursultan Nazarbayev (1990–2019)
9		Ädılbek Jaqsybekov	9 December 2004	23 January 2008		Nursultan Nazarbayev (1990–2019)
10		Kairat Kelimbetov	23 January 2008	13 October 2008		Nursultan Nazarbayev (1990–2019)
11		Aslan Musin	13 October 2008	21 October 2012		Nursultan Nazarbayev (1990–2019)
12		Karim Massimov	21 October 2012	3 April 2014		Nursultan Nazarbayev (1990–2019)
13		Nūrlan Nyğmatulin	3 April 2014	21 June 2016		Nursultan Nazarbayev (1990–2019)
14		Ädılbek Jaqsybekov	21 June 2016	10 September 2018		Nursultan Nazarbayev (1990–2019)
15		Asset Issekeshev	10 September 2018	24 March 2019		Nursultan Nazarbayev (1990–2019)
16		Bakhytzhan Sagintayev	24 March 2019	28 June 2019		Kassym-Jomart Tokayev (since 2019)
17		Qyrymbek Köşerbaev	28 June 2019	18 September 2019		Kassym-Jomart Tokayev (since 2019)
18		Erlan Qoşanov	18 September 2019	1 February 2022		Kassym-Jomart Tokayev (since 2019)
19		Murat Nurtileu	1 February 2022	3 April 2023		Kassym-Jomart Tokayev (since 2019)
20		Oljas Bektenov	3 April 2023	6 February 2024		Kassym-Jomart Tokayev (since 2019)
21		Aybek Dädebay	6 February 2024	5 May 2026		Kassym-Jomart Tokayev (since 2019)
22		Roman Sklyar	5 May 2026	Incumbent		Kassym-Jomart Tokayev (since 2019)
