= Alikhan Baimenov =

Kazakh politician (born 1959)

- Әлихан Бәйменов; Älihan Bäimenov
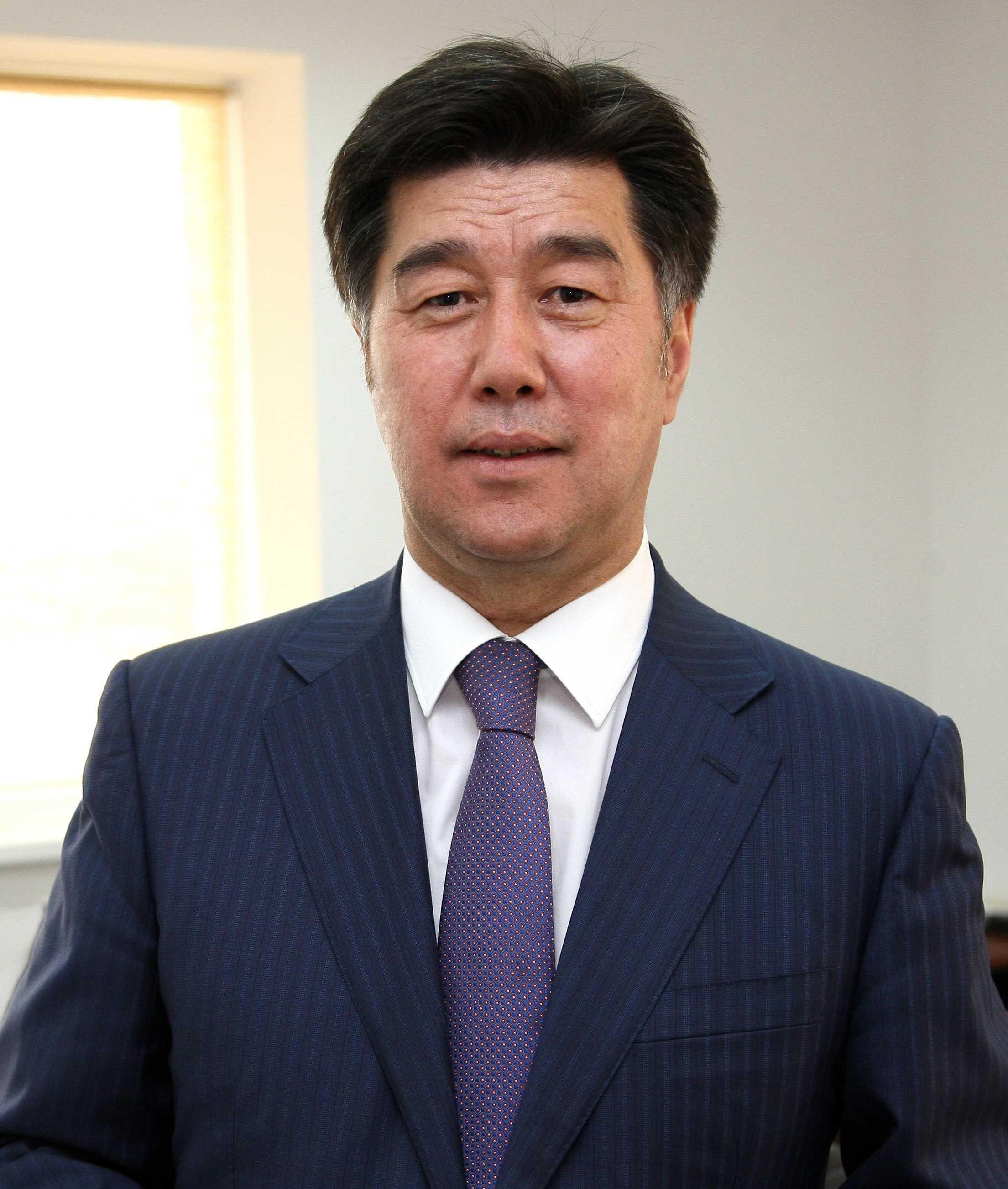
- Baimenov in 2016

Head of the Presidential Administration
- In office 31 August 1998 – 17 February 1999
- President: Nursultan Nazarbayev
- Preceded by: Akhmetzhan Yessimov
- Succeeded by: Sarybai Kalmurzaev

Minister of Labour and Social Protection of the Population
- In office 7 August 2000 – 22 November 2001
- President: Nursultan Nazarbayev
- Prime Minister: Kassym-Jomart Tokayev
- Preceded by: Nikolai Radostovets
- Succeeded by: Gulzhan Karagusova

Head of Prime Minister's Office
- In office 6 November 1997 – 31 August 1998
- Prime Minister: Nurlan Balgimbayev
- Preceded by: Stepan Shutkin
- Succeeded by: Altai Tileuberdin

Member of the Mäjilis
- In office 3 October 2006 – 20 June 2007

Chairman of the Aq Jol Democratic Party
- In office 13 March 2005 – 1 July 2011
- Preceded by: Office established
- Succeeded by: Azat Peruaşev

Personal details
- Born: 25 March 1959 (age 67) Karsakpay, Karaganda Oblast, Kazakh SSR, Soviet Union
- Spouse: Hadisha Baimenova
- Children: 3
- Education: Karaganda State Technical University

Älihan Mūhamediiaūly Bäimenov (Kazakh: Әлихан Мұхамедияұлы Бәйменов; born 25 March 1959) is a Kazakh politician who served as a member of the Mäjilis from October 2006 to June 2007, chairman of Aq Jol Democratic Party from March 2005 to July 2011 to which he was a nominee of in the 2005 Kazakh presidential election.

Prior to that, Baimenov also served as a Minister of Labour and Social Protection of the Population from August 2000 to November 2001, Head of the Presidential Administration of Kazakhstan from August 1998 to February 1999 and the head of Prime Minister's Office from November 1997 to August 1998. He is currently serving as a chairman of the Steering Committee of the Astana Civil Service Hub.

== Education ==
In 1981, he graduated from the Karaganda Technical Institute, Kazakhstan. In 1988, he did a post-graduate study at the Moscow Automobile and Road Construction State Technical University in Russia. He held PhD in Technical Sciences.

== Career ==
- 1981–1992 – Scientific and academic work.
- 1992–1994 – Deputy Head of Administration of the Zhezkazgan region. At that period, the first autonomous newspaper "ASU" (Adam.Sana.Yakyt) was released (1992).
- 1995–1996 – Deputy, the First Deputy Minister of Labor of the Republic of Kazakhstan.
- 1996–1997 – Deputy Head of the Executive Office of the President of the Republic of Kazakhstan, Head of the Organizational and control department of the Executive Office.
- 1997–1998 – Head of the Office of the Prime Minister.
- 1998–1999 – Head of the Executive Office of the President of the Republic of Kazakhstan.
- 1998–2000 – Chairman of the Agency of the Republic of Kazakhstan for Civil Service Affairs. He was a driving force behind the establishing the first authorized agency on civil service affairs. Kazakhstan became the first state among CIS countries, which introduced a mandatory competition-based recruitment of civil servants and divided public positions into administrative and political ones.
- 1997–2001 – Chairman of the Commission on Citizenship under the President of the Republic of Kazakhstan
- 2000–2001 – Minister of Labor and Social Protection of Population of the Republic of Kazakhstan. Under his leadership, for the first time among the CIS countries, the concept of three-level model of social protection and model of implementation of social insurance were developed in Kazakhstan. The necessity of insurance of employers' liability for damage to workers was also substantiated.
- 1 July 2011 – 2014 – Chairman of the Agency of the Republic of Kazakhstan for Civil Service Affairs (now called - the Agency of the Republic of Kazakhstan for Civil Service Affairs and Anti-Corruption). During that time, he headed the second stage of reforms in civil service. In the result, the new model reduced the number of political servants by eight times. The other initiative included introduction of Senior Executive Service – Corps “A” and professionalisation of HR departments.
- September 2014 – Chairman of Steering Committee of the Astana Civil Service Hub (ACSH), which serves as an institutional platform for improving civil service and knowledge sharing and comprises 39 participating countries today.

== Civic and political activity ==
- 1989–1990 – Leader of the first public movement in the Zhezkazgan region – "Ulytau", Head of the regional branch of the public anti-nuclear movement "Nevada–Semipalatinsk". The activists of the "Ulytau" movement were engaged in environment and cultural protection of the region, strived to eliminate the radar station near Zhezkazgan, collect and dispose of the detachable parts and fragments of carrier rockets from Baikonur.
- 1990–1993 – Member of Zhezkazgan regional Council of People's Deputies.
- 1993–1994 – Head of Zhezkazgan regional organization "Union of Kazakhstan National Unity".
- 1994–1995 – Member of the Supreme Soviet of the Republic of Kazakhstan (supreme legislative body).
- 1995–2000 – Deputy Chairman of the Assembly of People of Kazakhstan.
- 1997–2001 – Member of Commission on Human Rights under the President of Kazakhstan
- November 2001 – Co-founder and member of the political board of public association "Kazakhstan’s Democratic Choice".
- March 2002 – Initiator, co-founder and co-chairman of the Aq Jol Democratic Party of Kazakhstan.
- 2003 – Chairman of the Political Executive Committee of the Party.
- September 2004 – He led the candidates’ list of Aq Jol political party in the parliamentary elections. According to the party lists, "Ak Zhol" got about 30% of the votes, officially the party got only little bit more than 12%. Protesting against such actions of the authorities, he refused the deputy's mandate.
- March 2005 – 2011 – Chairman of the Aq Jol party.
- September 2005 – Candidate for President of the Republic of Kazakhstan.
- 2006 – Member of the State Commission for the Development and Specification of the Program for Political Reforms
- 2006–2007 – Member of Mazhilis of the Parliament of the Republic of Kazakhstan.
- 2015 – Co-chairman of “Kazakhstan Foundation for Management Development”.

He is also the President of the public fund "Zerde" (since 2002), the Head of the Intellectual Discussion Club "Temirkazyk" (2003–2012), the President of the Republican Federation for Togyzkumalak (since 2005) and the President of the World Federation for Togyzkumalak (2008).

== Publications ==
Baimenov is known as an author of a number of publications, books focused on public governance, civil service, management, social protection, politics and party-building:

- "Civil Service in the Republic of Kazakhstan" (2000)
- "Civil Service. International Experience. Kazakhstan's Model" (2000)
- "Together for the present and future of Kazakhstan" (2003, co-author)
- "Aq Jol, Kazakhstan!" (2003, co-author)
- "Теmirkazyk" (2004)
- "Constitutional Reform: matured necessity" (2005)
- "Changes Without Shocks" (2005).
- "Bureaucracy and Cooperation" (2018).
- "Public Service Excellence in the 21st Century", Alikhan Baimenov, Panos Liverakos (2019)
- "Public Service Evolution in Post-Soviet countries: Diversity in the New Reality", Palgrave Macmillan (2022) (co-edited by Baimenov)

== Awards ==
- The Jubilee medal "20 years of independence of Kazakhstan" (14 December 2011)
- The Order of Parasat (14 December 2013)
- UN award for its contribution to the development of regional and global South-South cooperation (2014)
- The Order "Barys" III class award (March, 2022)
- ASPA’s 2022 International Public Service Award for a huge contribution to both the practice and scholarship of public administration (March 2022, United States)
