= Balkhash District =

Coordinates: 44°49′19″N 76°16′04″E

Balkhash
- District
- Балқаш ауданы
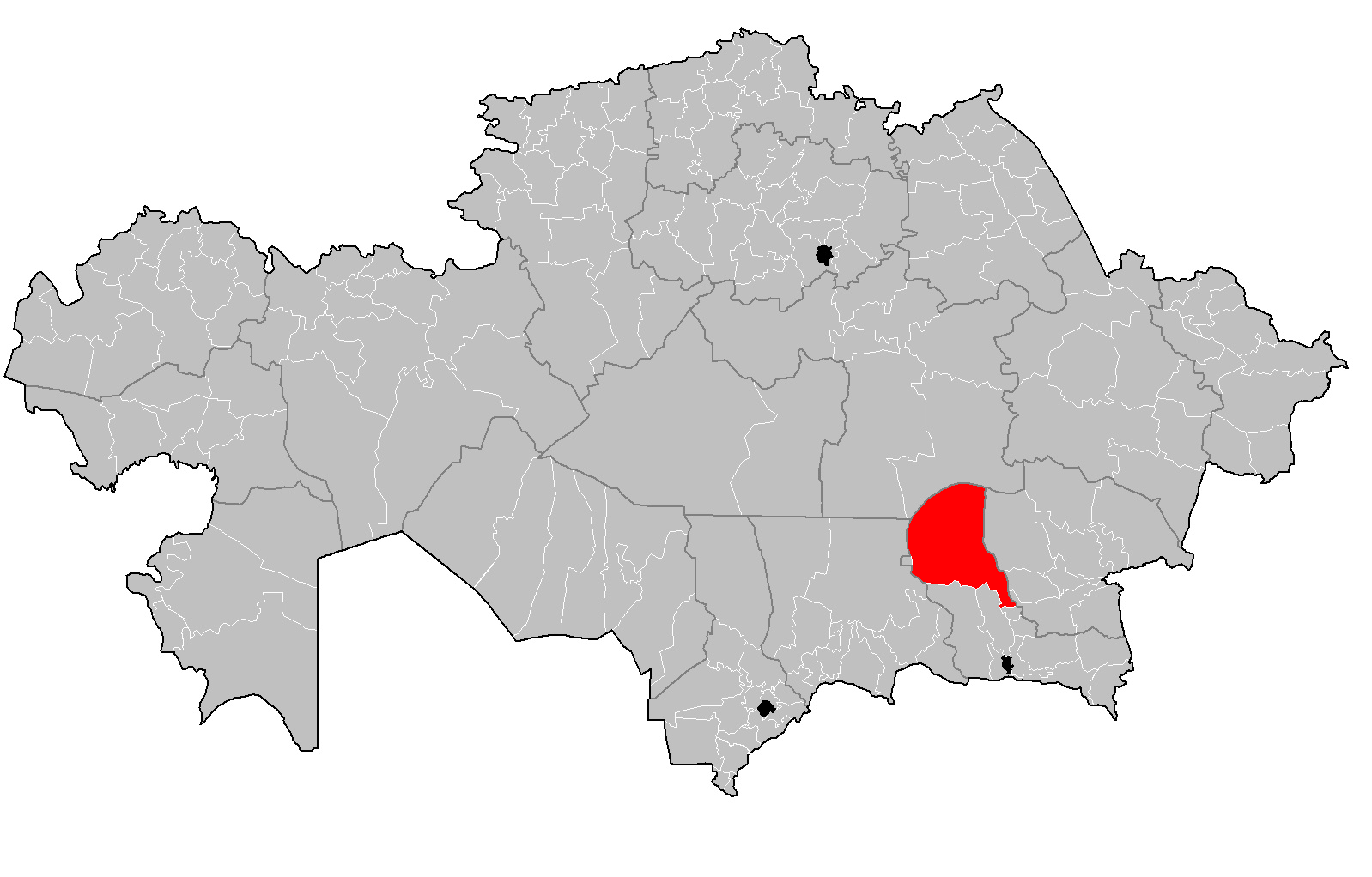
- Country: Kazakhstan
- Region: Almaty Region
- Administrative center: Bakanas

Government
  - Akim (mayor): Azat Kutpanbetov

Area
  - Total: 14,400 sq mi (37,400 km^{2})

Population (2013)
  - Total: 30,402
- Time zone: UTC+6 (East)

Balkhash District (Kazakh: Балқаш ауданы, Balqaş audany) is a district of Almaty Region in Kazakhstan. The administrative center of the district is the selo of Bakanas. Population: 30,402 (2013 estimate); 30,047 (2009 census results); 30,967 (1999 census results).

== Geography ==
The Balkhash District is located in the northwestern part of Almaty Region. It occupies the territory from the Malaysarinsky ridges in the southeast to the southern shores of Lake Balkhash in the north, part of the Saryesik-Atyrau Desert and in the west and south the sands of Taukum and the Zhusandala Plain. The relief is flat. The climate is continental. Winter is cold, summer is hot and dry. The average temperatures in January are -13-15°C, in July 24°C. The average annual amount of precipitation is 100-150 mm. The largest river is Ili with a length of 1001 km. The Akdala irrigation system was laid along its right bank.
