= Baglan Mailybayev =

Kazakh politician (born 1975)

- Бағлан Асаубайұлы Майлыбаев
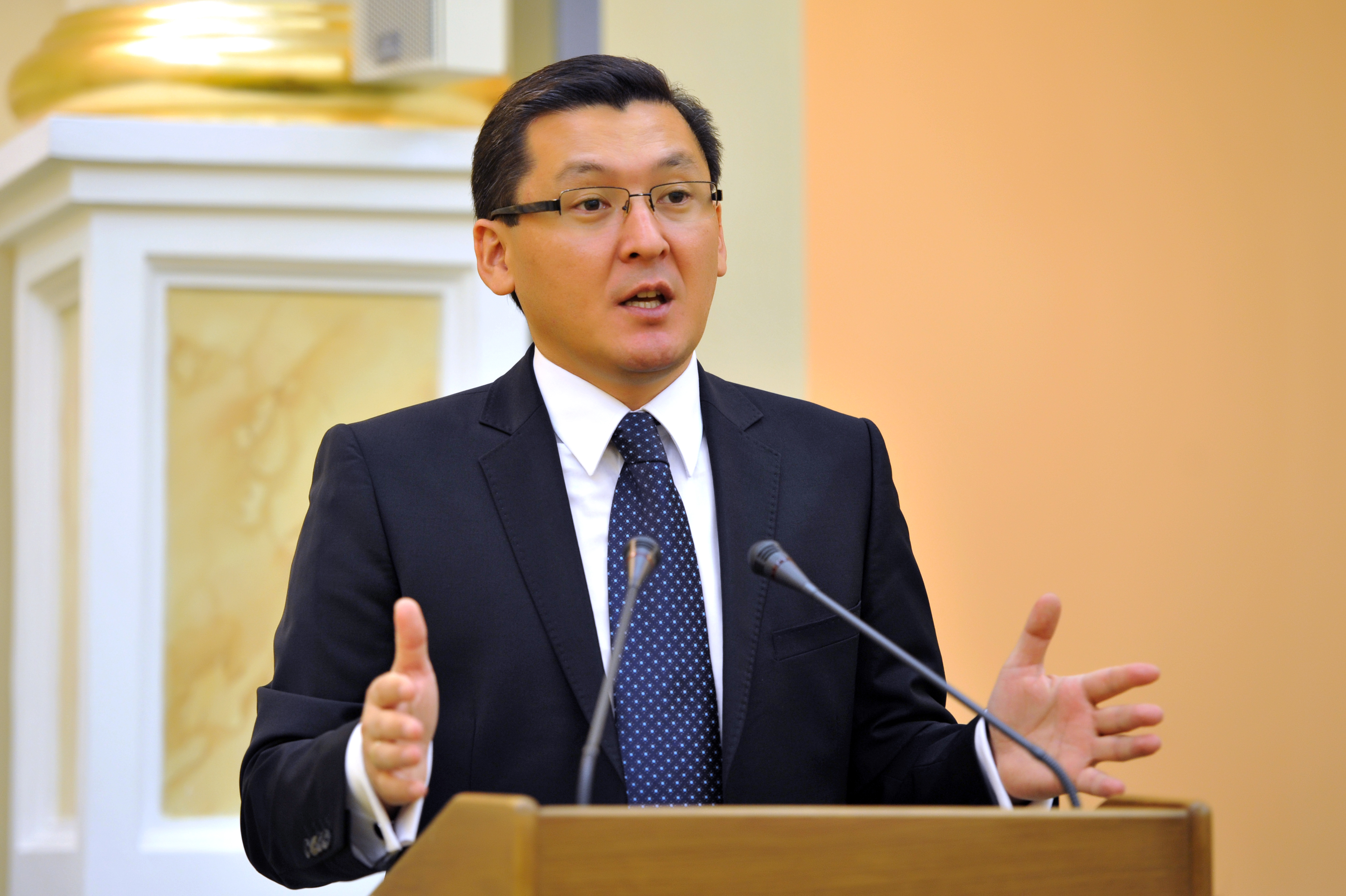

Deputy Head of the Presidential Administration
- In office 6 October 2011 – 12 January 2017
- President: Nursultan Nazarbayev
- Preceded by: Maulen Ashimbayev
- Succeeded by: Malik Murzalin (2019)

Press Secretary of the President
- In office 25 June 2009 – 6 October 2011
- Preceded by: Erlan Bayzhanov (2008)
- Succeeded by: Dauren Abaev

Vice Minister of Culture and Information
- In office 2 December 2008 – 24 June 2009

Chairman of the Committee of Information and Archives of Ministry of Culture and Information
- In office October 2008 – December 2008

Head of the Press Office of the President
- In office December 2004 – October 2008

Personal details
- Born: 20 May 1975 (age 50) Zhambyl region, Kazakhstan,
- Party: National Democratic Party "Nur Otan"

Baglan Mailybayev (Kazakh: Бағлан Асаубайұлы Майлыбаев, Bağlan Asaubaiūly Mailybaev) a Kazakh politician. He served as Deputy Head of the Presidential Administration of the Republic of Kazakhstan; He earned and a Doctor of Law (2002). He earned a PhD in political science (1998).

== Early life ==
He was born on 20 May 1975 in Zhambyl region, Kazakhstan. In 1996 he obtained a bachelor's degree in journalism from Kazakh State National University.

In 1998 he earned a PhD in political science at the Russian Academy of Public Administration.

== Career ==
Between 1998 and 2002 he worked as a senior researcher at the Institute of State and Law of the National Academy of Sciences and as a lecturer at Kazakh State University of International Relations and World Languages.

In February and May 2002 he worked as Head of the Mass Media Department of the Ministry of Culture, Information and Public Accord.

From May 2002-September 2003 he was a President of the Joint Stock Company "Republican Newspaper Kazakhstanskaya Pravda".

Between September 2003 and December 2004 he was a President of the Joint Stock Company Zan.

In December 2004 he became Head of the Press office of the President.

In October 2008 he became Chairman of the Committee of Information and Archives of Ministry of Culture and Information.

In December 2008 he became Vice Minister of Culture and Information.

Between June 2009 and October 2011 he worked as Presidential Press Secretary.

In October 2011 he was appointed Deputy Head of the Presidential Administration by Presidential decree.

== Personal life ==
He is married and has two children. He speaks Kazakh, Russian and English fluently.

== Awards ==
Baglan Mailybayev was awarded "Kurmet", "Parasat" orders, medals and a letter of acknowledgement of the President. In 1998 he became a prizewinner at the award of Young Scientists of National Academy of Sciences.

== Publications ==
He is the author of 4 monographs and more than 150 scientific publications. He authored feature stories as a supervisor and worked as a scriptwriter of television projects and documentaries.

== Research interests ==
Comparative Political Science, Theory of State and Law, History of State and Law, Constitutional Law. Language abilities.
