= List of Mäjilis members of the 8th Parliament of Kazakhstan =

This is a list of members of the Mäjilis in the 8th Parliament of Kazakhstan, elected in the 2023 legislative election on 19 March. A total 98 members were elected to their seats, with 69 from party-list proportional representation and 29 from single-mandate territorial constituencies. The elected members became officially registered within the Central Election Commission on 28 March 2023 and were subsequently sworn to their parliamentary seats on 29 March.

== List of MPs ==
=== By single-member district ===
Constituency		Deputy	Birth year	Party	Faction	First elected / previously elected
Region	No.	Deputy	Birth year	Party	Faction	First elected / previously elected
Astana	1	Däulet Turlyhanov	1963	Amanat	None	2023
Astana	2	Däulet Muqaev	1992	Independent	Inclusive Parliament	2023
Almaty	3	Ermurat Bapi	1959	Independent	None	2023
Almaty	4	Erlan Stambekov	1966	Independent	None	2023
Almaty	5	Baqytjan Bazarbek	1981	Independent	None	2023
Shymkent	6	Danabek Isabekov	1983	Amanat	Amanat	2023
Shymkent	7	Bolatbek Najmetdinuly	1970	Amanat	Amanat	2023
Abai Region	8	Nurtai Sabilianov	1962	Amanat	Amanat	2023, 2004
Akmola Region	9	Aina Mysyrälimova	1966	Amanat	Amanat	2023
Aktobe Region	10	Qazybek Älişev	1978	Amanat	Amanat	2023
Almaty Region	11	Ardaq Nazarov	1980	Independent	None	2023
Almaty Region	12	Daniar Qasqaraurov	1976	Independent	None	2023
Atyrau Region	13	Ädil Jubanov	1972	Amanat	Amanat	2023
West Kazakhstan Region	14	Abzal Quspan	1978	Independent	None	2023
Jambyl Region	15	Muqaş Eskendirov	1960	Amanat	Amanat	2023
Jambyl Region	16	Güldara Nurymova	1965	Amanat	Amanat	2021
Jetisu Region	17	Ruslan Qojasbaev	1976	Amanat	Amanat	2023
Karaganda Region	18	Qudaibergen Beksultanov	1956	Amanat	Amanat	2023
Karaganda Region	19	Arman Qalyqov	1973	Amanat	Amanat	2023
Kostanay Region	20	Erkin Äbil	1969	Amanat	Amanat	2023
Kyzylorda Region	21	Marhabat Jaiymbetov	1965	Amanat	Amanat	2023
Mangystau Region	22	Edil Jañbyrşin	1966	Amanat	Amanat	2023
Pavlodar Region	23	Jarkynbek Amantai	1988	Amanat	Inclusive Parliament	2023
North Kazakhstan Region	24	Erkebulan Mämbetov	1962	Amanat	Amanat	2023
Turkistan Region	25	Qairat Balabiev	1965	Amanat	Amanat	2023
Turkistan Region	26	Ulasbek Sädibekov	1967	Amanat	Amanat	2023
Turkistan Region	27	Temir Qyryqbaev	1983	Amanat	Amanat	2023
Ulytau Region	28	Erbolat Satybaldin	1975	Amanat	Amanat	2023
East Kazakhstan Region	29	Luqbek Tumaşinov	1963	Amanat	Amanat	2023

=== By party-list ===
Deputy	Birth year	Party	Faction	First elected / previously elected					
Deputy	Birth year	Party	Faction	First elected / previously elected	Qaraqat Äbden	1974	Auyl	Auyl	2023
Erlan Äbdiev	1987	Amanat	Inclusive Parliament	2023, 2007					
Murat Äbenov	1965	Amanat	Amanat	2023					
Konstantin Avershin	1976	Amanat	Amanat	2022					
Tilektes Adambekov	1989	Amanat	Amanat	2021					
Ashat Aimagambetov	1982	Amanat	Amanat	2023					
Amanjol Altai	1971	Amanat	Amanat	2022					
Nikolai Arsyutin	1970	Auyl	Auyl	2023					
Nurlan Äuesbaev	1957	JSDP	Inclusive Parliament	2023					
Nurjan Äşimbetov	1969	Amanat	Amanat	2023, 2019					
Janarbek Äşimjanov	1976	Amanat	Amanat	2021					
Anas Baqqojaev	1980	Auyl	Auyl	2023					
Erlan Barlybaev	1967	Aq Jol	Aq Jol	2016					
Marat Başimov	1966	Amanat	Amanat	2023					
Elnur Beisenbaev	1986	Amanat	Amanat	2021					
Erjan Beisenbaev	1990	Aq Jol	Inclusive Parliament	2023					
Berik Beisenğaliev	1966	Amanat	Amanat	2023					
Ruslan Berdenov	1985	Respublica	Respublica	2023					
Jiguli Dairabaev	1954	Auyl	Auyl	2023					
Natalia Dementyeva	1980	Amanat	Amanat	2021					
Serik Egizbaev	1963	Auyl	Auyl	2023					
Ğalymjan Eleuov	1978	Amanat	Amanat	2021					
Murat Ergeşbaev	1966	Amanat	Amanat	2023					
Dania Espaeva	1961	Aq Jol	Aq Jol	2016					
Rinat Zaiytov	1983	Amanat	Amanat	2023					
Aian Zeinullin	1989	Auyl	Auyl	2023					
Baqtyqoja Izmuhambetov	1948	Amanat	Amanat	2023, 2016, 2012					
Snezhanna Imasheva	1981	Amanat	Amanat	2016					
Qazybek Isa	1962	Aq Jol	Aq Jol	2021					
Pavel Kazantsev	1960	Amanat	Amanat	2016					
Bolat Kerimbek	1982	Amanat	Amanat	2023					
Vera Kim	1982	Amanat	Amanat	2023, 2021					
Dmitry Koloda	1975	Amanat	Amanat	2021					
Erlan Qoşanov	1962	Amanat	Amanat	2022					
Aigül Quspan	1964	Amanat	Amanat	2021					
Oljas Quspekov	1986	Respublica	Respublica	2023					
Yulia Kuchinskaya	1982	Amanat	Amanat	2021					
Magerram Magerramov	1971	QHP	Inclusive Parliament	2022, 2016					
Samat Musabaev	1969	Amanat	Amanat	2021					
Dinara Naumova	1997	Respublica	Inclusive Parliament	2023					
Samat Nurtaza	1982	Amanat	Amanat	2023					
Azat Peruaşev	1967	Aq Jol	Aq Jol	2012					
Sergey Ponomarev	1961	Amanat	Amanat	2023					
Albert Rau	1960	Amanat	Amanat	2017					
Ashat Raqymjanov	1983	JSDP	JSDP	2023					
Maksim Rozhin	1983	Amanat	Amanat	2023					
Tatyana Savelyeva	1976	Amanat	Inclusive Parliament	2023					
Ajar Sağandyqova	1971	JSDP	Inclusive Parliament	2023					
Asqar Sadyqov	1969	Aq Jol	Aq Jol	2023					
Erlan Sairov	1970	Amanat	Amanat	2021					
Nauryz Sailaubai	1994	JSDP	Inclusive Parliament	2023					
Nartai Särsenğaliev	1991	Amanat	Amanat	2023					
Aidos Sarym	1975	Amanat	Amanat	2021					
Erbolat Sauryqov	1971	Auyl	Auyl	2023					
Seitjan Kenjeğul	1982	QHP	Inclusive Parliament	2023					
Tañsäule Serikov	1981	Auyl	Inclusive Parliament	2023					
Bauyrjan Smağulov	1963	Amanat	Amanat	2023					
Irina Smirnova	1960	QHP	Inclusive Parliament	2016					
Ekaterina Smyshlyaeva	1982	Amanat	Amanat	2021					
Juldyz Süleimenova	1983	Amanat	Inclusive Parliament	2021					
Islam Suñqar	1995	QHP	Inclusive Parliament	2023					
Mädi Täkiev	1978	Amanat	Inclusive Parliament	2023					
Gauhar Tanaşeva	1974	QHP	Inclusive Parliament	2023					
Nurgül Tau	1973	Respublica	Inclusive Parliament	2023					
Maqsat Tolyqbaev	1988	Amanat	Amanat	2023					
Düisenbai Turğanov	1959	Amanat	Amanat	2021					
Aidarbek Qojanazarov	1983	Respublica	Respublica	2023					
Ünzila Şapaq	1973	Amanat	Amanat	2023					
Nikita Shatalov	1992	Amanat	Amanat	2023					
Dinara Şükijanova	1987	Respublica	Respublica	2023					

== List of MPs elected in the 2023 election ==
After the 2023 legislative election, the Central Election Commission registered the newly-elected Mäjilis members for both single-mandate constituencies and party-list winning seats on 28 March 2023, with parties having pre-allocated mandates to their candidates according to the number of seats won.

=== Aq Jol ===
1. Erlan Barlybaev
2. Erjan Beisenbaev
3. Dania Espaeva
4. Qazybek Isa
5. Azat Peruaşev
6. Asqar Sadyqov

=== Amanat ===
1. Murat Äbenov
2. Serik Egizbaev
3. Konstantin Avershin
4. Tilektes Adambekov
5. Ashat Aimagambetov
6. Nurjan Äşimbetov
7. Janarbek Äşimjanov
8. Amanjol Altai
9. Marat Başimov
10. Elnur Beisenbaev
11. Berik Beisenğaliev
12. Natalia Dementyeva
13. Murat Ergeşbaev
14. Ğalymjan Eleuov
15. Rinat Zaiytov
16. Snezhanna Imasheva
17. Baqtyqoja Izmuhambetov
18. Pavel Kazantsev
19. Bolat Kerimbek
20. Dmitry Koloda
21. Erlan Qoşanov
22. Aigül Quspan
23. Yulia Kuchinskaya
24. Samat Musabaev
25. Samat Nurtaza
26. Sergey Ponomarev
27. Albert Rau
28. Maksim Rozhin
29. Tatyana Savelyeva
30. Erlan Sairov
31. Aidos Sarym
32. Nartai Särsenğaliev
33. Bauyrjan Smağulov
34. Ekaterina Smyshlyaeva
35. Juldyz Süleimenova
36. Mädi Täkiev
37. Maqsat Tolyqbaev
38. Düisenbai Turğanov
39. Ünzila Şapaq
40. Nikita Shatalov

=== Auyl ===
1. Jiguli Dairabaev
2. Erlan Äbdiev
3. Qaraqat Äbden
4. Anas Baqqojaev
5. Erbolat Sauryqov
6. Nikolai Arsyutin
7. Aian Zeinullin
8. Tañsäule Serikov

=== Nationwide Social Democratic Party ===
1. Nurlan Äuesbaev
2. Ashat Raqymjanov
3. Ajar Sağandyqova
4. Nauryz Sailaubai

=== People's Party ===
1. Magerram Magerramov
2. Seitjan Kenjeğul
3. Irina Smirnova
4. Islam Suñqar
5. Gauhar Tanaşeva

=== Respublica ===
1. Aidarbek Qojanazarov
2. Dinara Şükijanova
3. Dinara Naumova
4. Ruslan Berdenov
5. Nurgül Tau
6. Oljas Quspekov

=== Territorial constituencies ===
1. Däulet Turlyhanov
2. Däulet Muqaev
3. Ermurat Bapi
4. Erlan Stambekov
5. Baqytjan Bazarbek
6. Danarbek Isabekov
7. Bolatbek Najmetdinuly
8. Nurtai Sabilianov
9. Aina Mysyrälimova
10. Qazybek Älişev
11. Ardaq Nazarov
12. Daniar Qasqaraurov
13. Ädil Jubanov
14. Abzal Quspan
15. Muqaş Eskendirov
16. Güldara Nurymova
17. Ruslan Qojasbaev
18. Qudaibergen Beksultanov
19. Arman Qalyqov
20. Erkin Äbil
21. Marhabat Jaiymbetov
22. Edil Jañbyrşin
23. Jarkynbek Amantai
24. Erkebulan Mämbetov
25. Qairat Balabiev
26. Ulasbek Sädibekov
27. Temir Qyryqbaev
28. Erbolat Satybaldin
29. Luqbek Tumaşinov

== See also ==
- 2023 Kazakh legislative election
- 8th Parliament of Kazakhstan
