= Inclusive Parliament =

Group in the Kazakhstan lower house

Inclusive Parliament Инклюзивті Парламент
- Chamber: Mäjilis
- Legislature(s): 8th Parliament of Kazakhstan
- Foundation: 27 June 2023
- Member parties: Amanat; QHP; JSDP; Respublica; Aq Jol; Independent
- Leader: Erlan Äbdiev
- Representation: 18 / 98
- Ideology: Disability rights Inclusion

The Inclusive Parliament (Kazakh: Инклюзивті Парламент, romanized: Ïnklyuzïvti Parlament; Russian: Инклюзивный Парламент) is a parliamentary group in the Mäjilis. It was formed in 2023 during the 8th convocation of the Mäjilis, which comprises deputies from all six parties and independents, as well as the Senate deputies.

The parliamentary group was formed after the election of deputies with disabilities to the Mäjilis in the 2023 legislative election. It aims to address issues related to disability rights, improve inclusion, and enhance the quality of life for people with disabilities in Kazakhstan.

== History ==
In 2020, the Parliament passed a mandatory parliamentary quota law, requiring parties to nominate at least 30% of women and young people as deputy candidates for the lower house, the Mäjilis. However, the 2021 legislative election was held before another amendment to the law was enacted in late 2021 under President Kassym-Jomart Tokayev's proposal, including persons with special needs in the quota, which was expected to affect the composition of the Majilis in the next election.

Following the early dissolution of the 7th Parliament of Kazakhstan, the 2023 legislative election saw the election of several lawmakers with disabilities for the 8th Parliament of Kazakhstan. This development prompted the creation of the Inclusive Parliament group consisting of 18 deputies on 27 June 2023 under the resolution of the Bureau of the Mäjilis, which would soon commence its duties under the leadership of Amanat deputy Erlan Äbdiev.

== List of group leaders ==
Group leader				Deputy leader(s)			
Name	Term start	Term end	Notes	Name	Term start	Term end	Notes
Erlan Äbdiev	27 June 2023	present	Member of Amanat	Läzzat Qaltaeva	8 September 2023	present	Deputy of the Senate
Erlan Äbdiev	27 June 2023	present	Member of Amanat	Seitjan Kenjeğul	8 September 2023	present	Member of QHP

== Historical membership ==
=== 8th convocation ===
Name	Party
Erlan Äbdiev	Amanat
Läzzat Qaltaeva	Amanat
Seitjan Kenjeğul	QHP
Gauhar Tanaşeva	QHP
Jarkynbek Amantai	Amanat
Nurlan Äuesbaev	JSDP
Erjan Beisenbaev	Aq Jol
Magerram Magerramov	QHP
Däulet Muqaev	Independent
Dinara Naumova	Respublica
Tatyana Savelyeva	Amanat
Ajar Sağandyqova	JSDP
Nauryz Sailaubai	JSDP
Tañsäule Serikov	Auyl
Irina Smirnova	QHP
Islam Suñqar	QHP
Juldyz Süleimenova	Amanat
Nurgül Tau	Respublica
