= 2026 Kazakh local elections =

Elections in Kazakhstan

- 29 November 2026

3,447 seats in 228 mäslihats
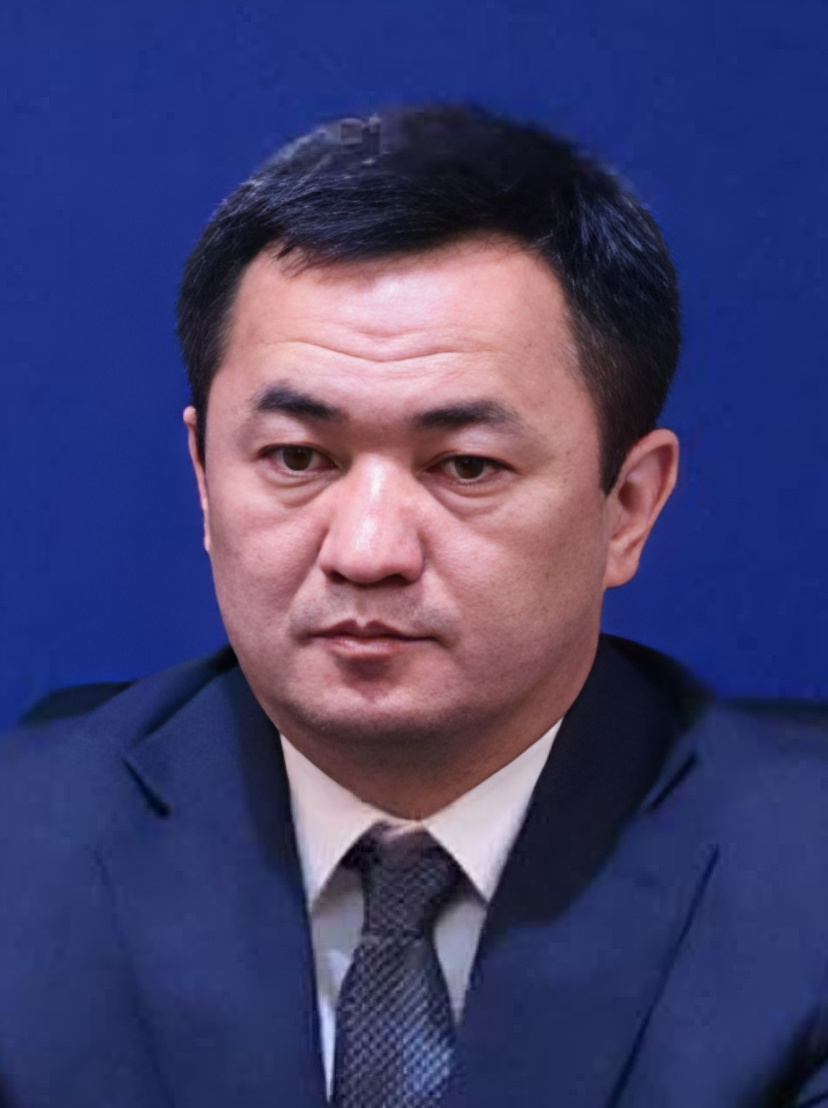

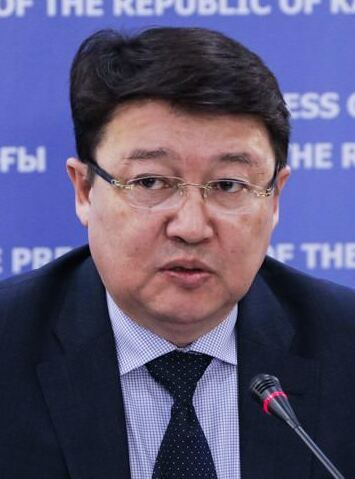

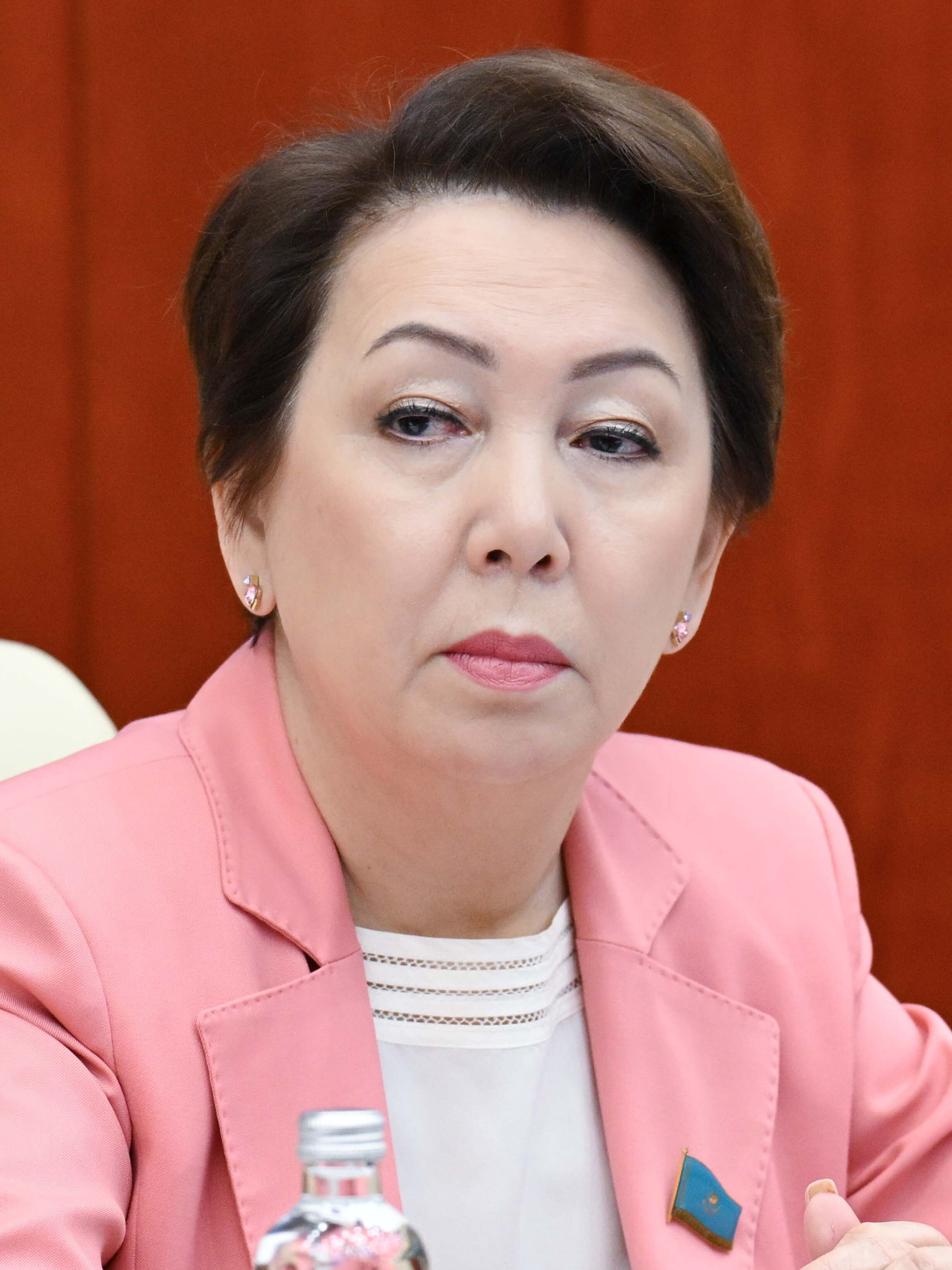

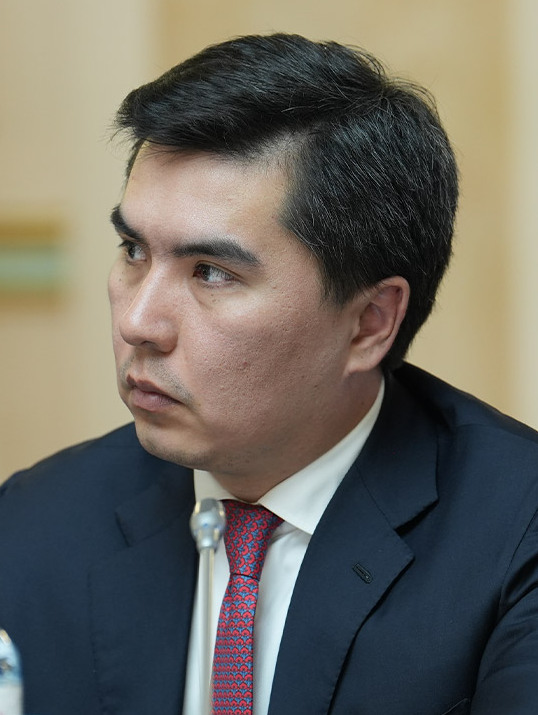

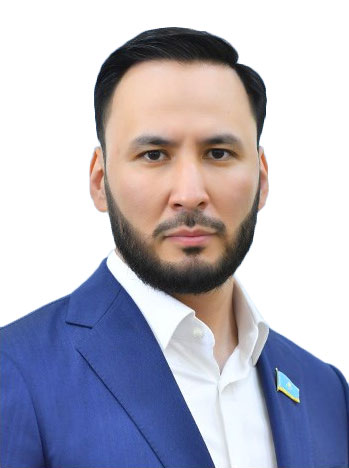

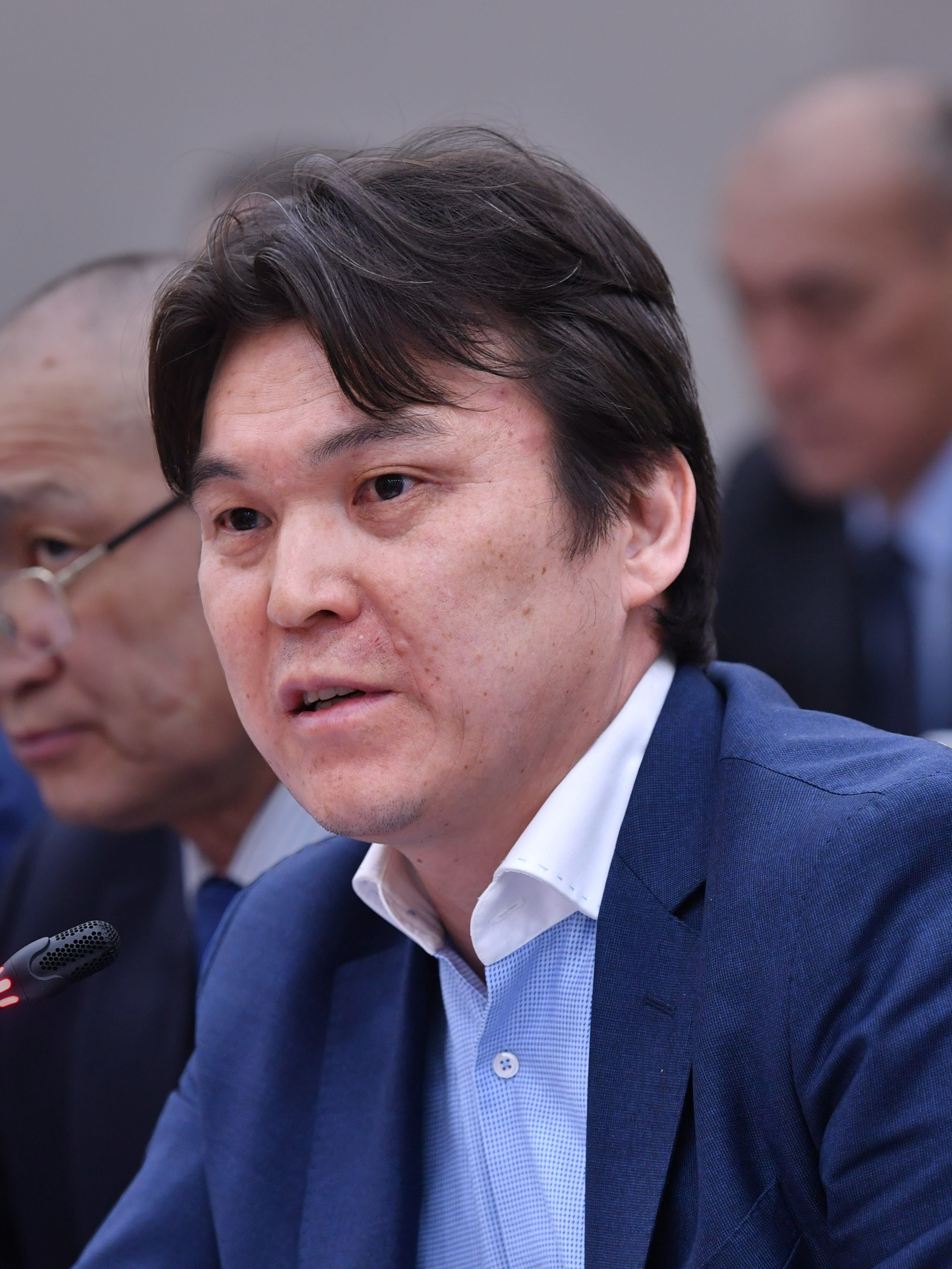
Leader	Aibek Dädebai	None	Qairat Aituğanov
Party	Adilet	Independent	Auyl
Leader since	7 May 2026		23 June 2026
Last election	New	355 seats	212 seats
Leader	Dania Espaeva	Nursultan Şoqanov	Aidarbek Qojanazarov
Party	Aq Jol	QHP	Respublica
Leader since	13 June 2026	27 June 2026	6 December 2022
Last election	162 seats	85 seats	49 seats
Leader	Azamathan Ämirtai
Party	Baytaq
Leader since	26 April 2022
Last election	8 seats

Early local elections are scheduled to be held in Kazakhstan on 29 November 2026 for 3,447 deputies for 228 local councils (mäslihats), comprising 20 regional-level mäslihats, 38 city mäslihats and 170 district mäslihats.

== Background ==
The previous local elections for the 3,415 local assembly (mäslihat) seats at all levels were held in March 2023 under a new electoral system, alongside the elections to the Mäjılıs. The ruling Amanat party won an absolute majority of 2,450 seats, followed by the Auyl party with more than 210 seats, while independent candidates won a total of 355 seats.

In 2025, following President Kassym-Jomart Tokayev's parliamentary reform proposal, work began on drafting constitutional amendments. The process ultimately led to the adoption of a new draft constitution, which provided for a transition from a bicameral to a unicameral legislature, replacing the Mäjılıs and Senate with a single body, the Kurultai. A majority of voters approved the new constitution in the March 2026 constitutional referendum. It entered into force on 1 July 2026, triggering the early dissolution of the Parliament of Kazakhstan and the election of deputies to the first convocation of the new unicameral Kurultai. Unlike the national legislature, the constitutional reform did not alter the system or current terms of the mäslihats elected in 2023, which remained in office following the dissolution of parliament and were initially expected to complete their five-year terms in 2028, meaning that the 2026 legislative elections were the first since 2004 to be held without concurrent mäslihat elections. Political scientist Daniar Ashimbaev discussed the possibility of holding the Kurultai and mäslihat elections simultaneously, as was customary in Kazakhstan, but noted that the new constitution preserved incumbent mäslihat deputies' powers until March 2028, allowing local elections to be held separately.

Ahead of the 2026 Kurultai elections, the ruling Amanat party announced its decision to merge into the newly formed Ädilet party and did not contest the elections under its own name. Rauan Kenzhekhanuly, a member of Ädilet's political council bureau, estimated that completing the legal procedures for the merger would take five to six months, during which Amanat would continue to exist as a legal entity and its affiliated mäslihat deputies would retain their mandates. Kenzhekhanuly speculated that new mäslihat elections might follow the completion of the merger but emphasized that this was his personal hypothesis rather than the party's official position. The Amanat–Ädilet party merger prompted debate over the status of current mäslihat deputies elected from Amanat, with electoral law experts interviewed by BES.media arguing that the reorganization would not automatically terminate their mandates or require early elections. Ashimbaev, however, questioned whether the deputies could retain their seats after Amanat's legal dissolution, noting while that the existing mäslihats were expected to serve until the end of their terms in 2028, he did not rule out early mäslihat elections in late 2026 or early 2027. Political scientist Andrei Chebotarev similarly suggested that the elected Amanat deputies could either transfer to Ädilet without new elections or face the early dissolution of the mäslihats and a new election campaign the following year. Raqym Qoşqarbaev, director of the TALAP Center for Applied Research, also anticipated a renewal of regional representative bodies, including the mäslihats, following the legislative elections, as part of a broader restructuring of the country's political system. In September 2026, experts interviewed by BES.media discussed the possibility of holding early mäslihat elections rather than individual by-elections to fill vacant seats following the Amanat–Ädilet merger. Pavel Lobachev suggested that an announcement on by-elections might follow Tokayev's October State of the Nation Address, while political scientist Lilia Manshina considered new elections of the mäslihats a likely outcome after the completion of the merger, although no official decision had yet been made.

On 24 September 2026, Tokayev announced at a meeting of the People's Council plans to consult the prime minister and the chairman of the Kurultai on the early termination of the powers of all mäslihats, citing uncertainty over the mandates of deputies elected from Amanat following its merger with Ädilet. He stated that the Central Election Commission would set the date for new elections after the decision. On 12 October, Tokayev held consultations with Prime Minister Oljas Bektenov and Kurultai chairman Aibek Dädebai and subsequently signed a decree terminating the powers of mäslihats at all levels ahead of schedule.

== Electoral system ==
Article 9 of the Constitutional Law "On Elections in the Republic of Kazakhstan" stipulates that deputies of regional councils (mäslihats) and those of cities of republican significance, including the capital, are elected under a mixed electoral system for a five-year term, with half of the seats allocated through party-list proportional representation in a single territorial constituency and the other half elected in single-member territorial constituencies. If a mäslihat has an odd number of seats, the additional seat is elected in a single-member constituency. Deputies of district mäslihats and city mäslihats of regional significance are elected by plurality vote entirely in single-member territorial constituencies using first-past-the-post voting.

== Electoral timetable ==
On 13 October 2026, the Central Election Commission (CEC) issued Resolution No. 60/98 "On the appointment of early elections of deputies of mäslihats of the Republic of Kazakhstan", scheduling the election day for 29 November 2026.

The same day, the CEC adopted Resolution No. 60/99, approving the model calendar plan for the preparation and conduct of the early elections. The main stages of the electoral process were as follows:

- 12 October 2026: Presidential Decree No. 1521 terminated the powers of mäslihats at all levels ahead of schedule.
- 13 October 2026: The CEC scheduled the early elections.
- 14–27 October 2026: Candidate nomination and self-nomination, ending at 18:00.
- By 1 November 2026: Registration of party lists and candidates, ending at 18:00.
- 1–28 November 2026: Electoral campaigning, beginning at 18:00 on 1 November and ending at midnight before election day.
- 28 November 2026: Election silence.
- 29 November 2026: Election day.
- By 4 December 2026: Deadline for determining the election results, within five days of voting.

== Candidates ==
According to the CEC, a total of 10,971 candidates had been registered nationwide. Of these, 1,219 were included on 99 party lists contesting seats in the 20 regional-level mäslihats, while the remaining 9,752 candidates were registered to contest 3,113 single-member constituencies.

Seven political parties registered candidates for the elections: Auyl, the Nationwide Social Democratic Party, the People's Party of Kazakhstan, Respublica, Aq Jol, the Baytaq, and Ädilet. Of the 1,219 candidates included on party lists, 527 (43.2%) met the combined quota requirements for women and young people.

The number of party-list candidates varied by region. In Astana, seven parties registered a total of 101 candidates, while six parties registered 81 candidates in Karaganda Region and five parties registered 76 candidates in Jambyl Region.

During the registration period, some candidates withdrew their nominations, while others were refused registration for failing to meet legal requirements or submit the necessary documents. Abai Region recorded 76 withdrawals, Akmola Region – 26, and Pavlodar Region 42 withdrawals and 18 refusals of registration. Changes also occurred in party lists: the Baytaq list was refused registration in one region, a party withdrew its list in East Kazakhstan Region, and a Respublica candidate was removed from its list in Atyrau Region at the party's request.
