= List of Mäjilis members of the 7th Parliament of Kazakhstan =

This is a list of members of the Mäjilis in the 7th Parliament of Kazakhstan from 2021 to 2023, elected in the 2021 legislative election on 10 January. A total 107 members were elected to their seats, with 98 from party-list proportional representation and the additional 7 members indirectly elected from the Assembly of People of Kazakhstan. The elected members were officially sworn to their seats on 15 January 2021.

== List ==
Name	Party	Faction	Period	Term
Eldos Abakanov	Amanat	Jaña Qazaqstan	15 January 2021 – 19 January 2023	1st
Qainar Abasov	Amanat	Jaña Qazaqstan	15 January 2021 – 19 January 2023	1st
Berık Äbdığaliūly	Amanat	Jaña Qazaqstan	15 January 2021 – 14 June 2022	1st
Sauytbek Abdrahmanov	Assembly of People	Assembly of People	15 January 2021 – 19 January 2023	2nd
Azamat Äbıldaev	Aq Jol	Aq Jol	15 January 2021 – 19 January 2023	1st
Älia Absemetova	Amanat	Jaña Qazaqstan	15 January 2021 – 19 January 2023	1st
Konstantin Avershin	Amanat	Amanat	29 March 2022 – 19 January 2023	1st
Syrym Adambaev	Amanat	Jaña Qazaqstan	15 January 2021 – 19 January 2023	1st
Tılektes Adambekov	Amanat	Jaña Qazaqstan	15 January 2021 – 19 January 2023	1st
Samat Aqyşev	Amanat	Amanat	15 January 2021 – 19 January 2023	1st
Daniar Älımbaev	Amanat	Amanat	15 January 2021 – 19 January 2023	1st
Amanjol Ältai	Amanat	Amanat	3 March 2022 – 19 January 2023	1st
Avetik Amirhanian	Assembly of People	Assembly of People	15 January 2021 – 19 January 2023	1st
Ğalym Amreev	Amanat	Jaña Qazaqstan	15 January 2021 – 19 January 2023	1st
Jambyl Ahmetbekov	QHP	QHP	15 January 2021 – 19 January 2023	3rd
Mädi Ahmetov	Amanat	Jaña Qazaqstan	15 January 2021 – 19 January 2023	1st
Janarbek Äşımjanov	Amanat	Jaña Qazaqstan	15 January 2021 – 19 January 2023	1st
Erlan Barlybaev	Aq Jol	Aq Jol	15 January 2021 – 19 January 2023	2nd
Elnur Beisenbaev	Amanat	Jaña Qazaqstan	15 January 2021 – 19 January 2023	1st
Berık Bekjanov	Amanat	Jaña Qazaqstan	15 January 2021 – 19 January 2023	1st
Amangali Berdalin	Amanat	Amanat	15 January 2021 – 19 January 2023	1st
Gülnara Bijanova	Amanat	Jaña Qazaqstan	15 January 2021 – 19 January 2023	2nd
Anatoly Boichin	Amanat	Amanat	15 January 2021 – 19 January 2023	1st
Ilyas Bularov	Assembly of People	Assembly of People	15 January 2021 – 19 January 2023	1st
Natalia Dementieva	Assembly of People	Jaña Qazaqstan	15 January 2021 – 19 January 2023	1st
Berık Diusembinov	Aq Jol	Jaña Qazaqstan	15 January 2021 – 19 January 2023	2nd
Ğalymjan Eleuov	Amanat	Jaña Qazaqstan	15 January 2021 – 19 January 2023	1st
Mädi Eliubaev	Amanat	Amanat	15 January 2021 – 19 January 2023	1st
Qūdaibergen Erjan	Amanat	Amanat	15 January 2021 – 19 January 2023	2nd
Muqtar Erman	Amanat	Amanat	15 January 2021 – 30 March 2022	2nd
Syrym Ertaev	Amanat	Amanat	15 January 2021 – 19 January 2023	1st
Serık Erubaev	Aq Jol	Aq Jol	15 January 2021 – 19 January 2023	1st
Dania Espaeva	Aq Jol	Jaña Qazaqstan	15 January 2021 – 19 January 2023	2nd
Amanjan Jamalov	Amanat	Amanat	15 January 2021 – 19 January 2023	1st
Edil Jaŋbyrşın	Amanat	Jaña Qazaqstan	15 January 2021 – 19 January 2023	1st
Yuri Zhulin	Amanat	Amanat	15 January 2021 – 19 January 2023	1st
Aigül Jūmabaeva	Aq Jol	Aq Jol	15 January 2021 – 19 January 2023	1st
Dinara Zakieva	Amanat	Amanat	15 January 2021 – 19 January 2023	1st
Snejanna Imaşeva	Amanat	Jaña Qazaqstan	15 January 2021 – 19 January 2023	2nd
Qazybek Isa	Aq Jol	Aq Jol	15 January 2021 – 19 January 2023	1st
Pavel Kazantsev	Amanat	Amanat	15 January 2021 – 19 January 2023	2nd
Zarına Kamasova	Amanat	Jaña Qazaqstan	15 January 2021 – 19 January 2023	1st
Faizulla Qamenov	QHP	QHP	15 January 2021 – 4 March 2022	1st
Fahrıddın Qarataev	Amanat	Amanat	15 January 2021 – 19 January 2023	1st
Balaim Kesebaeva	Amanat	Amanat	15 January 2021 – 19 January 2023	2nd
Vera Kım	Amanat	Amanat	15 January 2021 – 19 January 2023	1st
Arman Qojahmetov	Amanat	Jaña Qazaqstan	15 January 2021 – 19 January 2023	3rd
Dmitry Koloda	Amanat	Amanat	15 January 2021 – 19 January 2023	1st
Aiqyn Qongyrov	QHP	QHP	15 January 2021 – 19 January 2023	3rd
Erlan Qoşanov	Amanat	Amanat	1 February 2022 – 19 January 2023	1st
Zakirzhan Kuziev	Assembly of People	Assembly of People	3 May 2022 – 19 January 2023	1st
Ğazız Qūlahmetov	QHP	Jaña Qazaqstan	15 January 2021 – 19 January 2023	1st
Mälik Qūlşar	Amanat	Amanat	15 January 2021 – 19 January 2023	1st
Marat Qūsaıynov	Amanat	Amanat	15 January 2021 – 19 January 2023	1st
Aigül Qūspan	Amanat	Jaña Qazaqstan	15 January 2021 – 19 January 2023	1st
Yulia Kuchinskaya	Amanat	Amanat	15 January 2021 – 19 January 2023	1st
Dmitry Legkiy	QHP	QHP	31 October 2022 – 19 January 2023	1st
Yury Li	Assembly of People	Jaña Qazaqstan	15 January 2021 – 19 January 2023	1st
Andrey Linnik	Aq Jol	Aq Jol	15 January 2021 – 1 September 2022	1st
Magerram Magerramov	QHP	QHP	14 March 2022 – 19 January 2023	1st
Aleksandr Miliutin	QHP	QHP	15 January 2021 – 19 January 2023	1st
Samat Mūsabaev	Amanat	Jaña Qazaqstan	15 January 2021 – 19 January 2023	1st
Qanat Musın	Amanat	Amanat	15 January 2021 – 14 June 2021	2nd
Darhan Myŋbai	Amanat	Amanat	15 January 2021 – 19 January 2023	2nd
Vakil Nabiev	Assembly of People	Assembly of People	15 January 2021 – 19 January 2023	1st
Dariga Nazarbayeva	Amanat	Amanat	15 January 2021 – 25 February 2022	1st
Sälimjan Naqpaev	Amanat	Jaña Qazaqstan	15 January 2021 – 19 January 2023	1st
Nurlan Nigmatulin	Amanat	Amanat	15 January 2021 – 1 February 2022	2nd
Gauhar Nuğmanova	QHP	QHP	14 March 2022 – 19 January 2023	1st
Nurbek Saiasat	Amanat	Amanat	25 February 2022 – 14 June 2022	1st
Aigül Nurkına	Amanat	Amanat	15 January 2021 – 19 January 2023	3rd
Qanat Nurov	Amanat	Jaña Qazaqstan	15 January 2021 – 19 January 2023	1st
Güldara Nurumova	Aq Jol	Jaña Qazaqstan	15 January 2021 – 19 January 2023	1st
Djamılia Nūrmanbetova	Amanat	Amanat	15 January 2021 – 19 January 2023	2nd
Janat Omarbekova	Amanat	Amanat	15 January 2021 – 19 January 2023	2nd
Erlık Omırgalı	Aq Jol	Aq Jol	15 January 2021 – 19 January 2023	1st
Şamıl Osın	Assembly of People	Assembly of People	15 January 2021 – 19 January 2023	1st
Berık Ospanov	Amanat	Amanat	15 January 2021 – 19 January 2023	2nd
Larisa Pavloves	Amanat	Amanat	15 January 2021 – 19 January 2023	1st
Igor Panshenko	Amanat	Amanat	15 January 2021 – 19 January 2023	1st
Aibek Paiaev	QHP	QHP	15 January 2021 – 25 October 2022	1st
Azat Peruashev	Aq Jol	Aq Jol	15 January 2021 – 19 January 2023	3rd
Artur Platonov	Amanat	Amanat	15 January 2021 – 19 January 2023	2nd
Nazilia Razzak	Amanat	Amanat	15 January 2021 – 19 January 2023	1st
Läzzat Ramazanova	Amanat	Jaña Qazaqstan	15 January 2021 – 19 January 2023	1st
Maqsat Ramanqūlov	Aq Jol	Aq Jol	15 January 2021 – 19 January 2023	1st
Albert Rau	Amanat	Amanat	15 January 2021 – 19 January 2023	2nd
Amerhan Raqymjanov	Amanat	Amanat	15 January 2021 – 19 January 2023	1st
Sergey Reshetnikov	QHP	QHP	15 January 2021 – 25 March 2022	1st
Erlan Sairov	Amanat	Jaña Qazaqstan	15 January 2021 – 19 January 2023	1st
Älia Saparova	Amanat	Amanat	15 January 2021 – 19 January 2023	2nd
Bauyrjan Sartbaev	Amanat	Jaña Qazaqstan	15 January 2021 – 19 January 2023	1st
Aidos Sarym	Amanat	Jaña Qazaqstan	15 January 2021 – 19 January 2023	1st
Fuat Satybaev	Aq Jol	Aq Jol	23 November 2022 – 19 January 2023	1st
Azat Sembinov	Aq Jol	Aq Jol	15 January 2021 – 1 September 2021	2nd
Sergey Simonov	Amanat	Amanat	15 January 2021 – 19 January 2023	1st
Aijan Skakova	QHP	Jaña Qazaqstan	15 January 2021 – 19 January 2023	3rd
Baqytbek Smağūl	Amanat	Amanat	15 January 2021 – 19 January 2023	1st
Erlan Smaiylov	QHP	Jaña Qazaqstan	15 January 2021 – 19 January 2023	3rd
Irina Smirnova	QHP	Jaña Qazaqstan	15 January 2021 – 19 January 2023	2nd
Ekaterina Smyshliaeva	Amanat	Amanat	15 January 2021 – 19 January 2023	1st
Jūldyz Süleimenova	Amanat	Jaña Qazaqstan	15 January 2021 – 19 January 2023	1st
Zülfia Süleimenova	Amanat	Jaña Qazaqstan	15 January 2021 – 10 March 2022	1st
Maqpal Täjmağambetova	Assembly of People	Jaña Qazaqstan	15 January 2021 – 19 January 2023	1st
Erlik Taijanov	Amanat	Amanat	15 January 2021 – 19 January 2023	1st
Ğanı Taşqaraev	Amanat	Jaña Qazaqstan	15 January 2021 – 19 January 2023	1st
Janna Telpekbaeva	Amanat	Jaña Qazaqstan	15 January 2021 – 19 January 2023	1st
Bekbolat Tileuhan	Amanat	Amanat	15 January 2021 – 29 December 2021	2nd
Bekqalı Torğaev	Amanat	Amanat	15 January 2021 – 19 January 2023	1st
Vladimir Tokhtasunov	Assembly of People	Assembly of People	15 January 2021 – 14 March 2022	1st
Meirambek Tölepbergen	Amanat	Amanat	15 January 2021 – 19 January 2023	1st
Düisenbai Tūrğanov	Amanat	Jaña Qazaqstan	15 January 2021 – 19 January 2023	1st
Asqarbek Üısimbaev	Amanat	Amanat	15 January 2021 – 19 January 2023	1st
Irina Unjakova	Amanat	Amanat	15 January 2021 – 19 January 2023	2nd
Äbilfas Hamedov	Assembly of People	Jaña Qazaqstan	15 January 2021 – 19 January 2023	1st
Gennady Shipovskikh	Amanat	Amanat	15 January 2021 – 19 January 2023	1st

== See also ==
- 2021 Kazakh legislative election
- 7th Parliament of Kazakhstan
