= Constituency No. 2 (Kazakhstan) =

Single-mandate territorial constituency in Kazakhstan

- Kazakh: №2 сайлау округі Russian: Избирательный округ №2
- Single-mandate constituency for the Mäjilis
- District: Esil and Saryarqa
- City: Astana
- Population: 754,501 (2023)

Current constituency
- Created: 2004; 2022 (re-established)
- Seats: 1
- Party: Independent
- Deputy: Däulet Muqaev
- Elected: 2023

The Constituency No. 2 (Kazakh: №2 сайлау округі, romanized: №2 sailau okrugı; Russian: Избирательный округ №2) was a single-mandate territorial constituency in Kazakhstan, represented in the lower chamber Mäjilis of the Parliament. It was located in the capital city of Astana and included the districts of Esil and Saryarqa.

The constituency was originally formed for the 2004 legislative election and existed until being abolished in 2007. It was reestablished in 2022 and represented by deputy Däulet Muqaev (Independent) from March 2023 until being abolished in 2026 when the electoral system reverted to list PR.

== Geography ==
The Constituency No. 2 was situated in the southeastern part of Astana and included the city districts of Esil and Saryarqa. It shared borders with No. 9 (Akmola Region) to the south and No. 1 (Astana) to the northeast.

== History ==
The Constituency No. 2 was formed for the 2004 legislative election as a result of redistribution within the boundaries of Astana, and Tölegen Muhamedjanov served as deputy from the territorial constituency. From there, the electoral district continued to exist until its dissolution following the 2007 constitutional amendment, which led to the abolition of all constituencies as part of the transition from a mixed-member majoritarian representation to a fully party-list proportional representation system. The change affected the composition of all seats in the lower chamber Mäjilis of the Kazakh Parliament beginning with the 2007 legislative election.

On 24 December 2022, the Constituency No. 2 was reestablished by the Central Election Commission, which came into effect on 1 January 2023 as a result of the 2022 amendment. The adoption of this amendment marked the reintroduction of a mixed electoral system for electing Mäjilis deputies, with the use of numbered constituencies being reinstated for the first time since 2004. In the 2023 legislative election, Däulet Muqaev was elected.

== Members ==
Election	Member	Party	%
2004	Tölegen Muhamedjanov	Independent	55.0
2007	Defunct constituency (Nationwide PR)		
2012	Defunct constituency (Nationwide PR)		
2016	Defunct constituency (Nationwide PR)		
2021	Defunct constituency (Nationwide PR)		
2023	Däulet Muqaev	Independent	29.5

== Election results ==
=== 2023 ===
2023 legislative election: District 2
Party	Candidate	Votes	%
Independent (Amanat)	Däulet Muqaev	51,769	29.51
Independent	Arman Şoraev	31,669	18.05
Independent	Baqytbek Smağul	21,178	12.07
Baytaq	Azamathan Ämirtai	12,261	6.99
Independent	Erik Joljaqsynov	10,326	5.89
Independent	Rüstem Janseiitov	7,472	4.26
Independent	Yakov Fedorov	5,422	3.09
Independent	Nurjan Bimendin	2,612	1.49
Independent	Batyr Seikenov	2,865	1.63
Independent	Däuren Ğabdull	2,374	1.35
Others		14,104	8.04
Against all		13,364	7.62
Total valid votes		175,416	99.01
Invalid or blank votes		1,748	0.99
Total votes		177,164	100
Majority		20,100	11.46
Independent win			
