= Ruslan Berdenov =

Kazakh politician

- Руслан Берденов
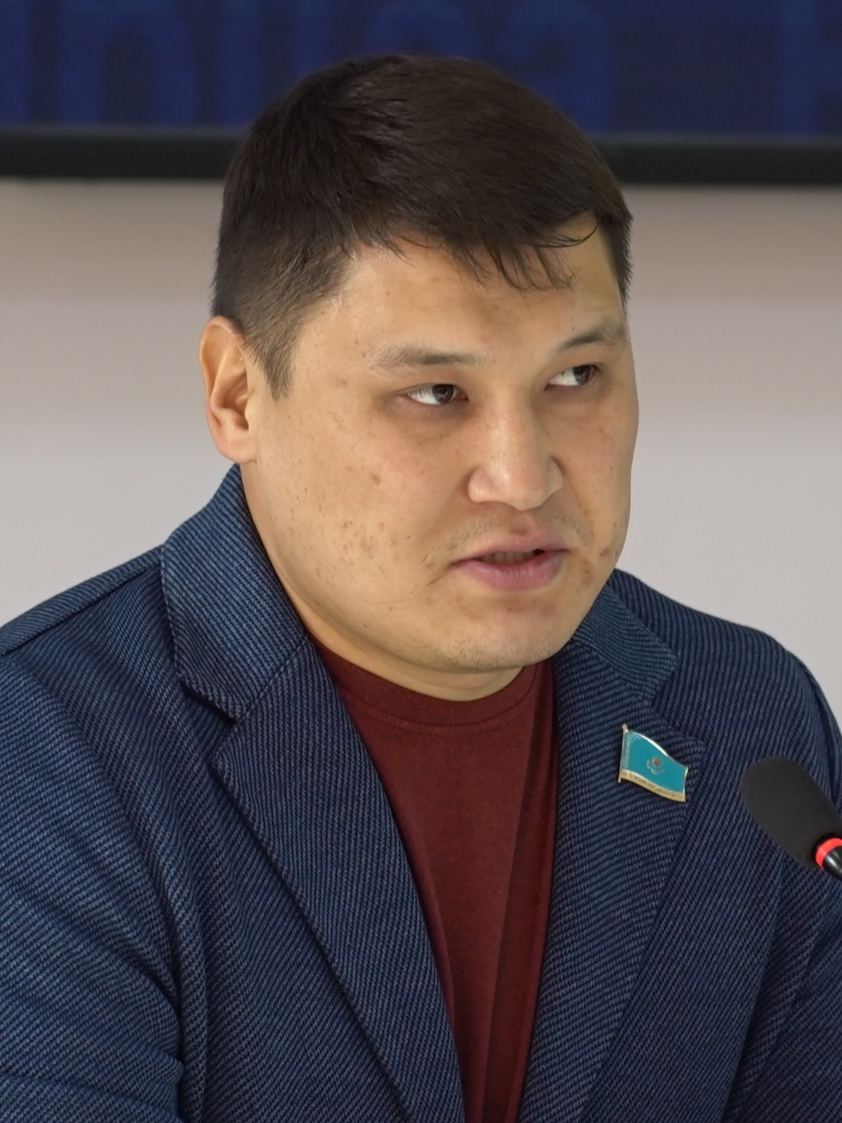
- Berdenov in 2024

Deputy Äkim of Shymkent
- In office 24 February 2025 – c. August 2025

Member of the Mäjilis
- In office 29 March 2023 – 24 February 2025
- Constituency: Respublica List

Personal details
- Born: Ruslan Arysbekovich Berdenov; 6 March 1985 (age 41) Shymkent, Kazakh SSR
- Party: Respublica
- Education: Al-Farabi Kazakh National University

Ruslan Arysbekovich Berdenov (Kazakh: Руслан Арысбекұлы Берденов; born 6 March 1985) is a Kazakh politician who has served as Deputy Äkim of Shymkent from February to August 2025. He previously served as the member of the Mäjilis from 2023 to 2025.

In April 2025, Berdenov survived an assassination attempt.

== Biography ==
Berdenov was born on 6 March 1985 in Shymkent, Kazakh SSR. In 2006, he graduated from Al-Farabi Kazakh National University with a degree in management. In 2009, he graduated from KIMEP University with a Master of Business Administration degree.

He began his career in 2005 as the retail director of Almaty Kus (Seymar Group) OJSC.

From February 2007 to July 2010, Berdenov served as Chief Logistics Coordinator at Procter & Gamble. From July 2010 to October 2012, he was the Director of the Rolling Stock Rental Department at Eastcomtrans LLP.

Berdenov worked as the General Director of Ak Niet LLP from November 2012 to May 2018. Until April 2019, he was a member of the Supervisory Board of Ak Niet LLP.

In April 2019, he became the Deputy Chairman of the Supervisory Board of Aq Niet Group, until March 2023.

On 28 March 2023, he began his political career as a deputy of the 8th convocation of the Mäjilis of the Parliament of Kazakhstan, a member of the Finance and Budget Committee, on the party list of Respublica.

On 24 February 2025, he was appointed as Deputy Äkim of Shymkent.

=== Assassination attempt ===
On 21 April 2025, at around 20:30 local time, Berdenov was shot three times near the Shymkent city administration building and taken to hospital, where he was preliminarily diagnosed with gunshot wounds to the right thigh and shoulder. The suspect was identified as Zhienbai Ernar Zhienbayuly (born 1995), a specialist at TOO "Turgyn Uy Shymkent" under the city akimat.

On 20 August 2025, the court found Zhienbai guilty of attempted murder and sentenced him to nine years in prison. In August 2025, Berdenov resigned as the Deputy Äkim of Shymkent.

Since 1 October 2025, he has been the Chairman of the Management Board of JSC "Almaty City Development Center".
