= Aigül Quspan =

Kazakh politician and diplomat (born 1961)

MP Aigül Qūspan
- Айгүл Құспан
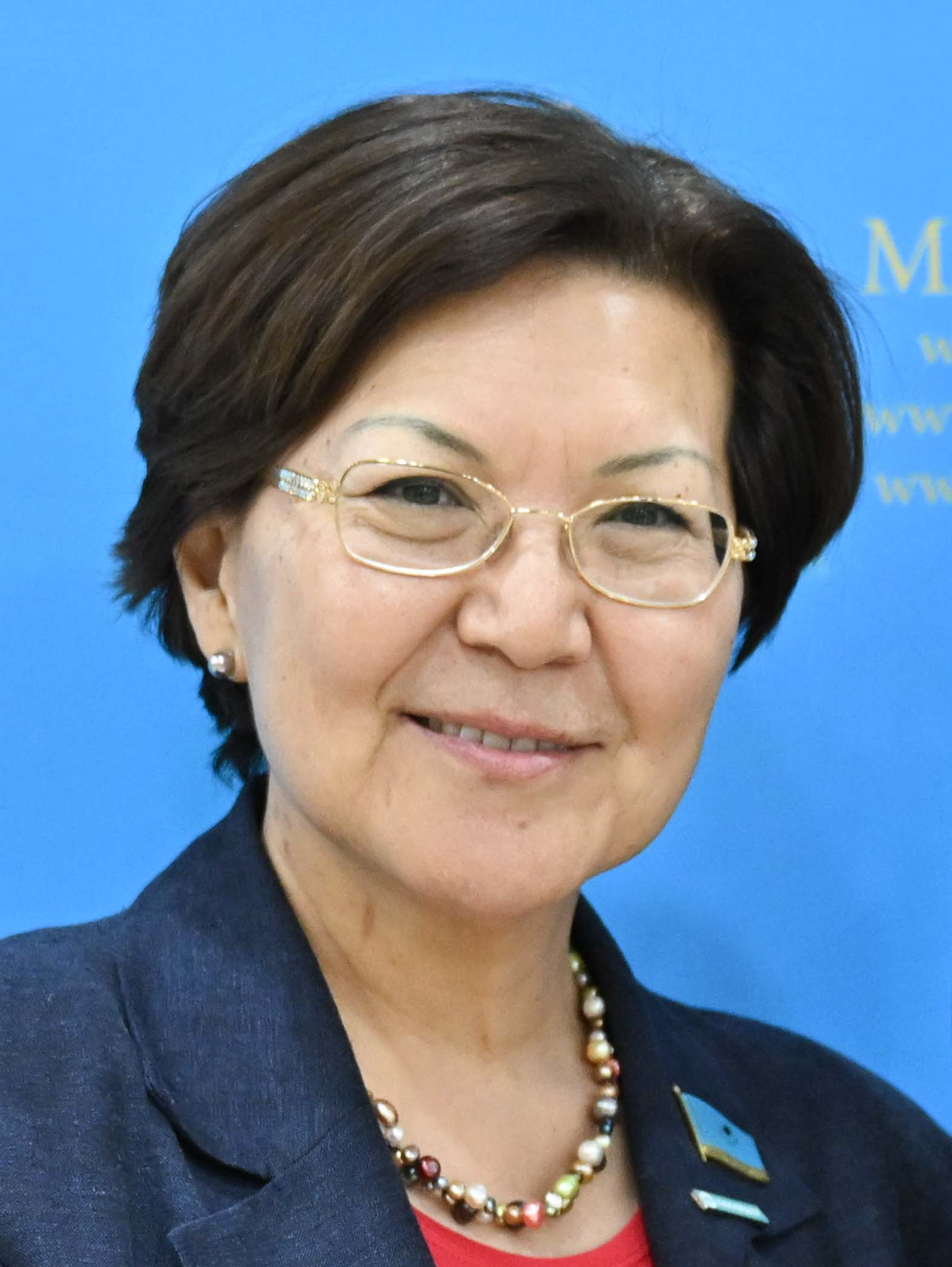
- Qūspan in 2023

Member of the Mäjilis
- In office 14 January 2021 – 1 July 2026
- Constituency: Nur Otan Party list (2021); Amanat Party list (2023)

Chair of the Committee on Foreign Affairs, Defense, and Security of the Mäjilis
- Incumbent
- Assumed office 15 January 2021
- Preceded by: Muhtar Erman

Ambassador of Kazakhstan to Belgium and Luxembourg, Permanent Representative to the European Union and NATO
- In office 22 May 2018 – 14 January 2021
- President: Nursultan Nazarbayev; Kassym-Jomart Tokayev
- Preceded by: Almaz Hamzaev
- Succeeded by: Margulan Baimuhan

Personal details
- Born: 24 July 1961 (age 65) Kazakh SSR, Soviet Union
- Party: Amanat
- Other political affiliations: Jaña Qazaqstan (parliamentary group, 2022–2023)
- Education: Kazakh Ablai Khan University of International Relations and World Languages; Moscow State Linguistic University; University of Rennes 1; École nationale d'administration

Aigül Saifollaqyzy Qūspan (Note: Often transliterated as Aygul Saifollakyzy Kuspan through a Russified Romanization of Айгуль Сайфоллакызы Куспан.) (Kazakh: Айгүл Сайфоллақызы Құспан, born 24 July 1961) is a Kazakh politician and diplomat, who has served as a Member of the Mäjilis and Chairwoman of its Committee on Foreign Affairs, Defense, and Security since January 2021.

Before her parliamentary career, Qūspan served as the Ambassador of Kazakhstan to Belgium and Luxembourg, as well as Permanent Representative to the European Union and NATO from 22 May 2018 to 14 January 2021.

== Early life and education ==
Qūspan was born on 24 July 1961 in Soviet Kazakhstan.

In 1983, she finished her studied at the Kazakh Ablai Khan University of International Relations and World Languages. Later, in 1989, she graduated Moscow State Linguistic University.

In 1995, Qūspan graduated the University of Rennes 1. There in France, she also finished her studied at the École nationale d'administration in 1996.

== Early career ==
From 1983 to 1984 and from 1989 to 1992, Qūspan taught at the Kazakh Ablai Khan University of International Relations and World Languages.

== Diplomatic career ==
Qūspan was an attaché, then third secretary of the Embassy of Kazakhstan in France from 1996 to 1999. She was the Second Secretary, later First Secretary, then Head of Division of the Department of Bilateral Cooperation of the Ministry of Foreign Affairs of Kazakhstan from 1999 to 2002.

From 2002 to 2004, she was an advisor, advisor-representative to the Ambassador of Kazakhstan to Austria. Later, from 2004 to 2006, she was the head of a division of the Department of Europe and America of the Ministry of Foreign Affairs.

From 2006 to 2011, she was an advisor to the Ambassador to Lithuania. From 2011 to 2013, she was the deputy director, later from 2014 to 2018, Director of the Europe Department of the Foreign Affairs Ministry.

In 2018, Qūspan was appointed the Ambassador of Kazakhstan to Belgium and Luxembourg, the Permanent Representative to the European Union and NATO. She held the position until 14 January 2021.

Qūspan has the diplomatic rank of Ambassador Extraordinary and Plenipotentiary of the 2nd class.

== Legislative career ==
As a result of the 2021 Kazakh legislative election, Qūspan was elected to the 7th Mäjilis on 14 January 2021 by the Nur Otan Party list. The next day, she was selected as Chairwoman of the Foreign Affairs, Defense, and Security Committee of the Mäjilis.

On 29 March 2023, after the 2023 Kazakh legislative election, she was re-elected as Member of Parliament and reappointed as Chairwoman of the committee.

For years, Qūspan was affiliated with the Nur Otan, later Amanat ruling political party. Since January 2022, she has been a member of its political council.

== Personal life ==
Qūspan is married and has children. She speaks Kazakh, Russian, English, French, and German.

== Awards and honours ==
Qūspan's state awards and honors include:

- Order of Kurmet (Kazakhstan, December 2019)
- Ordre national du Mérite (France, May 2019)
- Order of the Oak Crown (Luxembourg, December 2021)
