= Juldyz Süleimenova =

Kazakh historian and politician

- Жұлдыз Сүлейменова
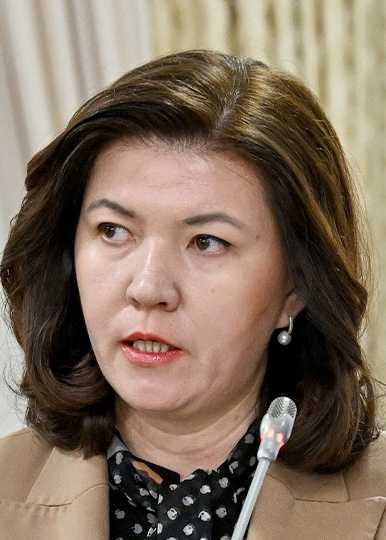
- Süleimenova in 2025

Minister of Education
- Incumbent
- Assumed office 29 September 2025
- President: Kassym-Jomart Tokayev
- Prime Minister: Oljas Bektenov
- Preceded by: Ğani Beisembaev

Member of the Mäjilis
- In office 14 January 2021 – 1 October 2025
- Parliamentary group: Jaña Qazaqstan (2022–2023)
- Constituency: Amanat Party List

Personal details
- Born: 25 August 1983 (age 43) Aktyubinsk, Kazakh SSR, Soviet Union (now Aktobe, Kazakhstan)
- Party: Amanat
- Education: Al-Farabi Kazakh National University; Kazakh National Women's Teacher Training University

Juldyz Dosbergenqyzy Süleimenova (Note: Often transliterated as Zhuldyz Dosbergenovna Suleimenova through a Russified Romanization of Жулдыз Досбергеновна Сулейменова.) (Kazakh: Жұлдыз Досбергенқызы Сүлейменова; born 25 August 1983) is a Kazakh historian, philosopher, and politician. She has served as Minister of Education of the Republic of Kazakhstan since 29 September 2025. From 14 January 2021 to 29 September 2025, she was a member of the Mäjilis of the Parliament of Kazakhstan, where she focused on social protection, development of the education system, science, and the defense of women's rights.

== Biography ==
Born in the city of Aktyubinsk (now Aktobe), Süleimenova graduated from the Faculty of History of Al-Farabi Kazakh National University in 2004. She completed a master's degree in philosophy and political science at the same university in 2008 and a doctoral program in Philosophy and Political Science in 2011. In 2012, she earned a PhD in Cultural Studies.

From 2000 to 2004, she served as chair of the student government at Al-Farabi Kazakh National University. She worked as a lecturer and head of youth committees at various institutions, including the Aktobe Institute of Almaty Academy of Economics and Statistics from 2004 to 2006. She also held roles in the youth wing of the Otan party and served as deputy chair of the national council of the Jas Otan youth wing from 2006 to 2007.

Between 2007 and 2008, Süleimenova taught history and law at the Multidisciplinary Gymnasium No. 159 named after I. Altynsarin in Almaty. She later served as deputy rector for educational work and chair of the youth administration at the Kazakh National Agrarian University from 2010 to 2011, dean for student affairs at the International Academy of Business in 2011, and from 2011 to 2012 as chief academic secretary at the Kazakh National Women's Teacher Training University.

From 2012 to 2014, she was a senior manager in the Department of Educational Policy and Programs of Nazarbayev Intellectual Schools, later becoming deputy director from 2014 to 2017 and director of development from 2017 to 2019. Between 2019 and 2021, she directed the physics and mathematics branch of Nazarbayev Intellectual School in Almaty.

=== Parliamentary career ===
Süleimenova was elected as a deputy of the 7th convocation of the Mäjilis on 15 January 2021 via the Nur Otan party list. She served on the Committee for Socio-Cultural Development. She became a member of the National Kurultai under the President on 14 June 2022.

She was also a member of the Jaña Qazaqstan deputy group from 9 February 2022.

In March 2023, she was elected to the 8th convocation of the Mäjilis through the Amanat party list. During her parliamentary tenure, she focused on social protection, women's rights, and education policy. She led the working group that developed the Law "On Public Oversight", aimed at increasing transparency in government work and enhancing civil society participation in decision-making. She also authored and chaired the working group for the Law "On Women's Rights", which introduced comprehensive measures for women's protection, including stricter penalties for domestic violence. On 26 May 2025, she was appointed to the National Commission on Women and Family Demographic Policy under the President of the Republic of Kazakhstan.

=== Minister of Education ===
On 29 September 2025, Süleimenova was appointed Minister of Education by Kassym-Jomart Tokayev's Presidential Decree No. 1021.

In this role, she oversees the development and reform of Kazakhstan's education system, with a focus on integrating technology and AI solutions into schools and universities. On 26 November 2025, a working group on the implementation of artificial intelligence in education was established, chaired by MP Ekaterina Smyshlyaeva, with Süleimenova actively supporting the initiative.

== Awards ==
- Medal named after Ybyrai Altynsarin (2019)
