= Arman Şoraev =

Kazakh public figure

- Арман Шораев
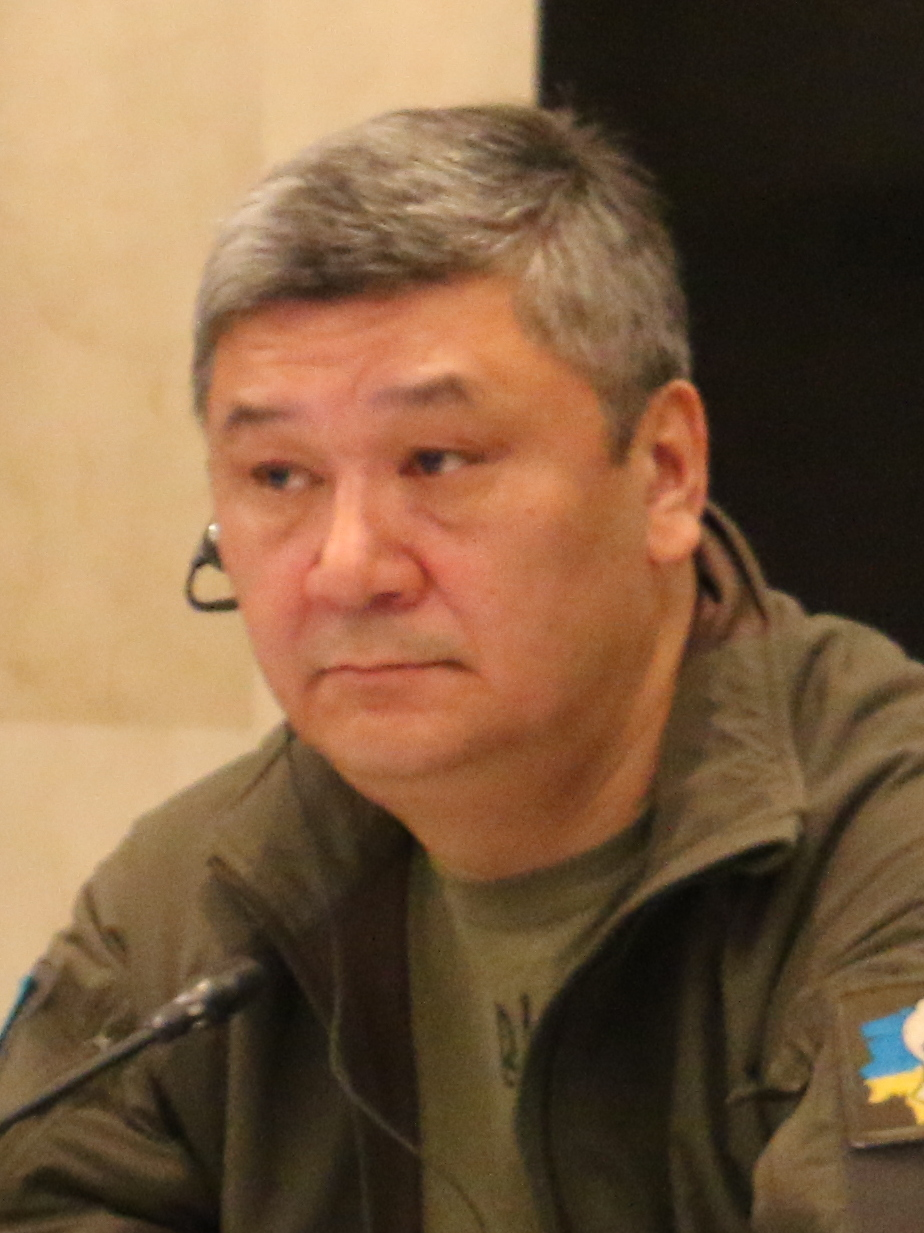
- Şoraev in 2023

Member of the National Council of Public Trust
- In office 17 July 2019 – 3 March 2020
- President: Kassym-Jomart Tokayev

Personal details
- Born: 7 May 1970 (age 56) Volodarskoye District, Kokshetau Oblast, Kazakh SSR, Soviet Union
- Party: Nur Otan (2006)
- Other political affiliations: Asar (2004–2006)
- Spouse: Zamira Şoraeva
- Children: 4
- Education: Kokshetau Pedagogical Institute; Adilet Law Academy; Kokshetau Institute of Economy and Management

Arman Tölegenūly Şoraev (Note: Often transliterated as Arman Tulegenovich Shurayev through a Russified Romanization of Арман Тулегенович Шураев.) (show-RAH-yev; Kazakh: Арман Төлегенұлы Шораев; born 7 May 1970) is a Kazakh politician and media personality.

== Early life and education ==
Şoraev was born on 7 May 1970, in the Volodarskoye District of Kokshetau Oblast (now Aiyrtau District, North Kazakhstan Region).

In 1990, he finished his studies at the Kokshetau Pedagogical Institute, thus becoming a teacher of the Russian language. In 2001, he studied law in the Adilet Law Academy. In 2005, he earned a master's degree in economics from the Kokshetau Institute of Economy and Management.

== Media career ==
Şoraev began his career as an editor on the Kokshetau Regional Radio's youth programmes, where he worked from 1989 to 1991. From there and until 1995, he was the main presenter of the radio's live translation.

From 1996 to 1997, Şoraev switched to independent media, as he headed Oqjetpes broadcasting. From there and until 1999, he was employed at the KTK TV channel as its own correspondent in Astana.

In 1999, Şoraev was appointed to a more administrative position, as he now headed the Akmola Regional TV and Radio Company. He held the position until 2004, when he became the Director of the Central Bureau of the Khabar Agency JSC. During his time at the position, Şoraev simultaneously headed the press-service of presidential candidate Nursultan Nazarbayev in the 2005 Kazakh presidential election. He left the position in 2006 and was briefly appointed as Deputy Director General of Khabar Agency.

Şoraev was the Chief Inspector of the Social and Political Department of the Presidential Administration of Kazakhstan from 2006 to 2007.

== Political career ==
A member of the executive committee of the Congress of Journalists of Kazakhstan, Şoraev was a member of the Public Council on Media (Information Policy) under the President from June 2005 to 2014. From 2011 to 2019, he was the President of the Qazaq kuresi Kazakh wrestling National Federation.

From 2004 to 2006, Şoraev was a member of the Akmola Regional department of the Asar political party. He switched his party affiliation afterwards, becoming a member of the Otan party Political Council in June 2006.

On 17 July 2019, Şoraev was among the people appointed by President Kassym-Jomart Tokayev to the National Council of Public Trust. On 3 March 2020, he was removed from the council membership.

=== Electoral history ===
In the 2004 and 2023 legislative elections, Şoraev unsuccessfully ran for a seat in the Mäjilis.

In the 2023 Kazakh legislative election, Şoraev ran as a self-nominee for the Mäjilis seat in the Constituency No. 2, Astana. Officially earning 31,669 of the 177,164 votes, Şoraev lost to blogger Däulet Muqaev, but disputed the election results. In response, Muqaev outlined the election observers present and criticised Şoraev for being more active on social media covering the Russian invasion of Ukraine rather than campaigning.

During the 2023 legislative election, Şoraev was the center of another controversy for allegedly insulting parliamentary candidates of the People's Party of Kazakhstan (QHP). Though Şoraev stated that he was intending to insult the QHP chairman Ermukhamet Ertisbaev instead, the court found him guilty of spreading misinformation about other political candidates in order to excel electorally and fined him.

== Political positions ==
=== Domestic politics ===
In 2022, Şoraev criticised the 7th Parliament of Kazakhstan for its sycophancy to the 2nd President of Kazakhstan Kassym-Jomart Tokayev. Commenting on the deputies posting a portrait of Tokayev with the caption "Let's unite around the President" in January 2022, he compared the acts to the former personality cult around Nursultan Nazarbayev. This comes a year after Şoraev also criticised the Mäjilis for electing unfit officials to ministerial positions. This statement, in which Şoraev controversially compared the Mäjilis to a donkey farm, came after the Minister of Ecology, Geology and Natural Resources Serıkqali Brekeşev was found not to have known the Kazakh language well enough.

=== Foreign affairs ===
Since the 2022 Russian invasion of Ukraine, Şoraev has been a very vocal supporter of Ukraine and has given an interview to Ukrainian journalist Dmytro Hordon.

== Personal life ==
Şoraev is married to Zamira Şoraeva. Şoraev has four children and speaks Kazakh and Russian.
