= Ministry of Education (Kazakhstan) =

Ministry of Education of the Republic of Kazakhstan
- Қазақстан Республикасының Оқу-ағарту министрлігі (Kazakh); Министерство просвещения Республики Казахстан (Russian)
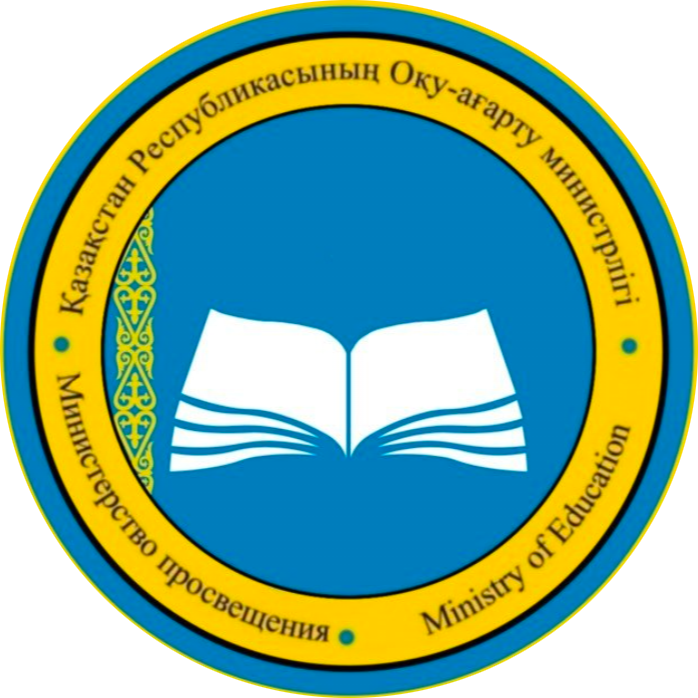
- Ministry emblem

Agency overview
- Formed: 11 June 2022
- Preceding agency: Ministry of Education and Science
- Jurisdiction: Government of Kazakhstan
- Headquarters: 8 Mangilik El Avenue, House of Ministries, Entrance 11, Astana 010000, Kazakhstan; 51°07′26″N 71°26′21″E
- Minister responsible: Juldyz Süleimenova, Minister of Education
- Website: www.gov.kz/memleket/entities/edu

The Ministry of Education or the Ministry of Enlightenment of the Republic of Kazakhstan (ME RK; Kazakh: Қазақстан Республикасының Оқу-ағарту министрлігі, ҚР ОМ; Russian: Министерство просвещения Республики Казахстан, МП РК) is a ministry of the Government of Kazakhstan responsible for state policy and administration in the fields of preschool, secondary, technical and vocational, post-secondary, and additional education, as well as the protection of children's rights and quality assurance in these areas. The ministry was established on 11 June 2022 following the division of the former Ministry of Education and Science.

== History ==
At a session dedicated to the anniversary of the National Academy of Sciences in Almaty on 1 June 2022, President Kassym-Jomart Tokayev proposed reorganising the Ministry of Education and Science into two separate departments, noting the need to strengthen scientific coordination and improve the quality of Kazakhstani research publications.

On 11 June 2022, this proposal was formalised by presidential decree, which split the Ministry of Education and Science into the Ministry of Education and the Ministry of Science and Higher Education. The newly formed Ministry of Education assumed responsibility for preschool, secondary, technical and vocational, and post-secondary education, as well as child-rights protection and quality assurance, while higher education and science functions were transferred to the new ministry. From there, Ashat Aimagambetov was appointed as the education minister.

== Structure ==
The Ministry includes the following departments:

- Committee for Quality Assurance in Education of the Ministry of Education of the Republic of Kazakhstan;
- Committee for the Protection of Children's Rights of the Ministry of Education of the Republic of Kazakhstan;
- Committee for Secondary Education of the Ministry of Education of the Republic of Kazakhstan.

List of organizations under the jurisdiction of the Ministry:

- Republican State Enterprise "Republican Scientific and Practical Center "Daryn".
- Republican State Enterprise "National Scientific and Practical Center for Physical Culture".
- Republican State Enterprise "Republican Educational and Health Center "Baldauyren".
- Republican State Enterprise "Republican Educational and Methodological Center for Additional Education".
- Republican State Enterprise on the Right of Economic management "National Academy of Education named after I. Altynsarin".
- Joint Stock Company "Financial Center" 50 (fifty) percent.
- Joint Stock Company "National Center for Research and Evaluation of Education "Taldau" named after Akhmet Baitursynuly".
- Joint Stock Company "National Center for Advanced Training "Orleu".
- Non-profit Joint Stock Company "Talap".
- Non-profit Joint Stock Company "National Institute for Harmonious Human Development".
- Non-profit Joint Stock Company "Republican Physics and Mathematics School".

== Objectives ==
According to its mandate, the Ministry is responsible for:

1. Formulating and implementing unified state policy in preschool, secondary, technical and vocational, post-secondary, and additional education, as well as in child rights protection.
2. Creating and maintaining conditions for obtaining education at all levels (except higher and postgraduate education).
3. Ensuring the protection of children's rights and lawful interests.

== List of ministers ==
- Ashat Aimagambetov (12 June 2022 — 4 January 2023)
- Ğani Beisembaev (4 January 2023 — 29 September 2025)
- Juldyz Süleimenova (29 September 2025 — present)

== See also ==
- Ministry of Education and Science (Kazakhstan)
- Ministry of Science and Higher Education (Kazakhstan)
- Government of Kazakhstan
