= Ğani Beisembaev =

Kazakh politician

- Ғани Бейсембаев
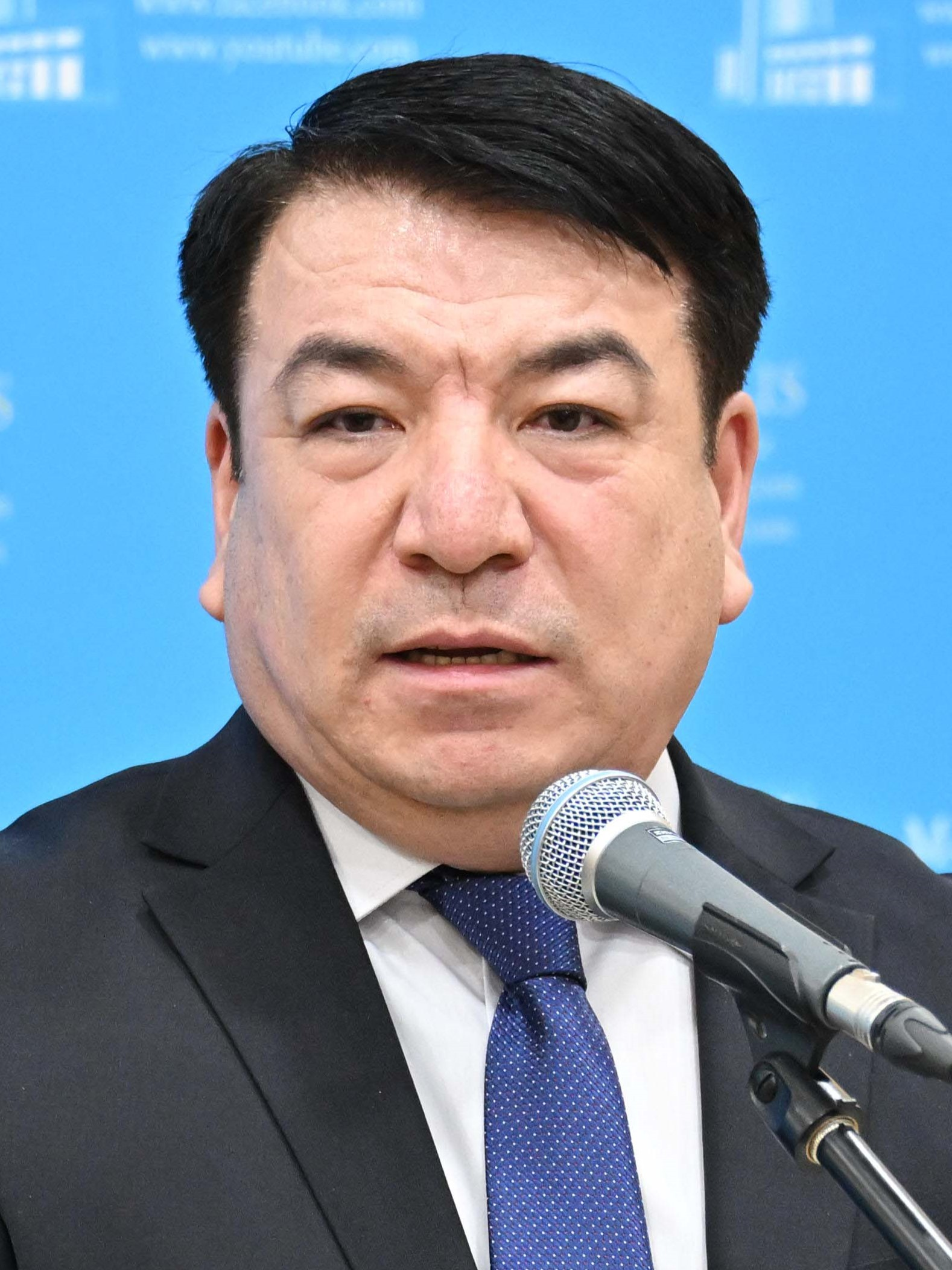
- Beisembaev in 2023

Minister of Education
- In office 4 January 2023 – 29 September 2025; Acting: 5 – 6 February 2024
- President: Kassym-Jomart Tokayev
- Prime Minister: Älihan Smaiylov; Roman Sklyar (acting); Oljas Bektenov
- Preceded by: Ashat Aimagambetov
- Succeeded by: Juldyz Süleimenova

Personal details
- Born: 3 June 1969 (age 57)
- Education: Abai Almaty National University
- Profession: Teacher, civil servant
- Awards: Medal for Distinguished Labor

Ğani Bektaiūly Beisembaev (Kazakh: Ғани Бектайұлы Бейсембаев; born 3 June 1969) is a Kazakh politician who served as the minister of education from 4 January 2023 to 29 September 2025.

== Biography ==
=== Early life and career ===
Beisembaev graduated from Abai Almaty National University, earning a Doctor of Philosophy and Psychology degree.

From 1989 to 1995, he worked as a Kazakh language teacher and deputy principal for academic affairs at Secondary School No. 14 in Talgar District, Almaty Region. Between 1995 and 1997, he served as director of Secondary School No. 12 in Ili District, Almaty Region. From 1997 to 2000, he worked as academic secretary and adviser at the Y. Altynsarin Kazakh Academy of Education.

In 2000–2001, Beisembaev headed the Education Department of the City of Kapchagay in Almaty Region. He was director of the International Center for Additional Education LLP from 2001 to 2006. From 2006 to 2007, he served as director of the Technical and Economic College of Almaty Technological University. Between 2007 and 2020, Beisembaev was general director of the Edtech-KZ International Education Center. In 2020, he became director of the Republican Scientific and Practical Center Textbook under the Ministry of Education and Science.

From 28 December 2020 to 2022, he served as president of the Y. Altynsarin National Academy of Education.

Between 28 March 2022 and August 2022, Beisembaev was Vice Minister of Education and Science of Kazakhstan. Beginning from 27 August 2022, he continued as Vice Minister in the restructured Ministry of Education.

=== Minister of Education (2023–2025) ===
On 4 January 2023, Beisembaev was appointed as minister of education by President Kassym-Jomart Tokayev. He was reappointed to the post on 4 April 2023 and again on 6 February 2024 following the formation of the Bektenov Government.

As minister of education, Beisembaev focused on modernizing Kazakhstan's preschool, secondary, and technical-vocational education systems, as well as strengthening child-protection policies. A key priority of his tenure was addressing the longstanding issue of three-shift schools. According to Beisembaev, their number had been reduced by around 70 institutions in the previous year, though problems persisted in Astana, Almaty, and several regions, where construction of new facilities continued.

Under Beisembaev, the coverage of free school meals in Kazakhstan was significantly expanded. Since 1 September 2023, free hot meals were provided for all primary students. Beginning 1 September 2024, the program was extended to grades 5–11 students from socially vulnerable populations through the Social Wallet voucher system, reaching more than 1.7 million children. From January 2025, the program was also extended to all pupils in grades 1–4 of private schools, covering over 25,000 children, with more than 12 billion tenge allocated from local budgets. Beisembaev oversaw the implementation of quality and safety measures, including revisions of nutrition standards on the basis of WHO recommendations, daily food inspections, mandatory sanitary certificates for suppliers, stricter qualification requirements for cooks, and installation of video surveillance in catering units. The ministry also began automating registration of children receiving meals and, in collaboration with the Ministry of Healthcare, developed a new nutrition standard scheduled for introduction in 2025.

In 2024, the ministry launched the construction of 232 schools for a total of 267,000 places, of which 83 opened on 1 September. An additional 111 facilities were scheduled for completion by the end of the year, alongside the modernization of 245 existing schools and upgrades to rural educational institutions. Beisembaev emphasized that school construction also stimulated regional economies, creating up to 30,000 new teaching posts.

He advocated for reducing the administrative burden on teachers so they could focus exclusively on educational work. Beisembaev also supported the cautious integration of artificial intelligence in classrooms, stressing that AI should function only as a supplementary tool rather than a replacement for independent study.

Another issue under his leadership was the elimination of outdoor school toilets: by 2024, only ten schools in the country still relied on them, compared to nearly 3,000 three years earlier. The ministry announced that all remaining outdoor toilets would be removed by the end of 2025 and replaced with indoor facilities.

Beisembaev consistently upheld the requirement for a compulsory school uniform and the principle of the school as a secular space, stating that wearing the hijab is not permitted in Kazakh educational institutions, including private schools. He reported that there were no cases of girls refusing to attend school due to the hijab issue, noting that disputes—such as those in the Atyrau Region—were resolved through explanatory outreach.

On 29 September 2025, he was relieved of his post by presidential decree.

== Awards ==
- Medal for Distinguished Labor
- Excellence in Education of the Republic of Kazakhstan
- Badge "Y. Altynsarin"
- For Merit to Trade Unions
