= Aidos Sarym =

Kazakh politician (born 1975)

MP Aidos Sarym
- Айдос Сарым
- Sarym in 2023

Member of the Kurultai
- Incumbent
- Assumed office 27 August 2026
- Constituency: Ädilet party list

Member of the 7th and 8th Mäjilis
- In office 14 January 2021 – 1 July 2026
- Constituency: Nur Otan party list (2021–2023); Amanat party list (2023–2026)

Personal details
- Born: 10 September 1975 (age 51) Almaty, Kazakh SSR, Soviet Union
- Party: Ädilet (since 2026)
- Other political affiliations: Amanat (formerly Nur Otan)
- Education: Al-Farabi Kazakh National University
- Awards: Order of Parasat; Order of Kurmet; Medal for Distinguished Labor
- Website: Official profile on Kurultai website

Aidos Ämirollaūly Sarym (Note: Kazakh: Айдос Әміроллаұлы Сарым) (Note: Often transliterated as Aidos Amirollaevich Sarym through a Russified Romanization of Айдос Амироллаевич Сарым.) (born 10 September 1975) is a Kazakh historian and politician serving as the member of the 1st Kurultai since 2026. Previously, he was a member of the 7th and 8th Mäjilis from 2021 to 2026. He is a co-author of the Constitution of Kazakhstan.

== Biography ==
Aidos Ämirollaūly Sarym was born on 10 September 1975 in Almaty, Soviet Kazakhstan.

Sarym began his career in 1992 at the Main Directorate of Archives and Documentation of Kazakhstan, working as a chief inspector and later as an advisor until 1997.

In 1997, after graduating from Al-Farabi Kazakh National University with a degree in history, he became a research fellow at the Kazakhstan Institute for Strategic Studies. Later that same year, he moved to the Ministry of Culture, Information and Public Accord under Altynbek Särsenbaiūly. Until 2001, he held various positions there, including specialist, chief specialist, head of a division in the Department of Internal Policy, and deputy director of the Mass Media Department.

In 2001, Sarym was appointed director of the Department of Internal Policy of the Atyrau Region. From 2002 to 2003, he served as a sector head in the Presidential Administration.

In 2003, when Särsenbaiūly became co-chairman of the Aq Jol, Sarym became his advisor and the party's press secretary. In 2004, after Särsenbaiūly joined the opposition and the party split, Sarsenbayuly founded the Nağyz Aq Jol party, and Sarym again served as his advisor. During this period, he also worked concurrently as deputy editor-in-chief of the newspaper Jas Alaş. Following Särsenbaiūly's death, Sarym became head of the Altynbek Särsenbaiūly Foundation in 2007, leaving both the party and the newspaper.

From 2009 to 2016, Sarym served as vice president of the Abai-Aqparat Foundation. From 2017 to 2019, he was an advisor to the director of the National Library of Kazakhstan, and from 2018 to 2020, he served as a freelance advisor to the Ministers of Public Development, Darhan Kaletaev and Dauren Abaev.

On 17 July 2019, president Kassym-Jomart Tokayev established the National Council of Public Trust and appointed Sarym as a member. When the council was dissolved in 2022 and replaced by the National Kurultai, Sarym retained his membership until the National Kurultai was abolished in 2026 alongside the previous Constitution.

From 2020 to 2021, he served as vice president of the Kazakhstan Association of Political Studies.

In November 2020, ahead of the 2021 legislative election, Sarym joined the Nur Otan party and ran as its candidate. On 14 January 2021, he was registered as a member of the 7th Mäjilis. On 20 September of the same year, he joined the Public Council of the Anti-Corruption Agency, serving until 2025, when the agency was incorporated into the National Security Committee and the council was dissolved.

On 10 February 2022, following the nationwide protests in Kazakhstan, Sarym and other members of the Mäjilis formed the Jana Qazaqstan parliamentary group.

He was re-elected to the 8th Mäjilis in 2023 representing Amanat (formerly Nur Otan).. The Jana Qazaqstan group did not operate in the new convocation.

After Kassym-Jomart Tokayev proposed abolishing the Senate and transitioning to a unicameral parliament on 8 October 2025, he appointed Sarym to the working group on parliamentary reform. Following Tokayev's subsequent statement in January 2026, that the transition to a unicameral system would require an entirely new Constitution, Sarym joined the Commission on Constitutional Reform. This process culminated in the adoption of a new Constitution of Kazakhstan which replaced the existing bicameral parliament with a unicameral Kurultai.

In June 2026, Amanat merged into the newly formed Ädilet, in which Sarym retained his membership.

On 1 July 2026, the mandates of all members of parliament were terminated following the implementation of a new Constitution of Kazakhstan. On 21 July Sarym was registered as a candidate for the Kurultai. In the legislative elections held on 23 August 2026, the Ädilet party won the majority of votes. On 27 August, the Central Election Commission registered Sarym as a member of the 1st Kurultai. The next day, at the opening session, he joined the Committee on International Affairs, Defense and Security.

== Personal life ==
Sarym has no publicly available information about his personal life and speaks Russian in addition to his native Kazakh.

== Awards ==
- Order of Parasat (2026)
- Medal "30 Years of the Parliament of Kazakhstan" (2026)
- Order of Kurmet (2021)
- Medal "30 Years of Independence of Kazakhstan" (2021)
- Medal "25 Years of the Constitution of Kazakhstan" (2020)
- Medal for Distinguished Labor (2020)
- Medal "25 Years of the Assembly of People of Kazakhstan" (2020)
- Birlik Gold Medal of the Assembly of People of Kazakhstan (2020)
- Medal "20 Years of Astana" (2018)
- Medal "25 Years of Independence of Kazakhstan" (2016)
