= Ashat Aimagambetov =

Kazakh politician (born 1982)

MP Askhat Aimagambetov
- Асхат Аймағамбетов
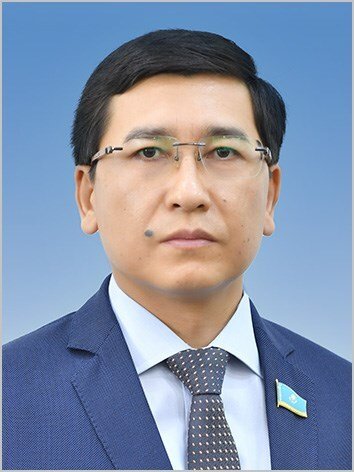
- Official portrait, 2023

Member of the Kurultai
- Incumbent
- Assumed office 27 August 2026
- Preceded by: Office established
- Constituency: Ädilet Party list

Member of the Mäjilis
- In office 29 March 2023 – 1 July 2026

Minister of Education
- In office 11 June 2022 – 4 January 2023
- President: Kassym-Jomart Tokayev
- Prime Minister: Älihan Smaiylov
- Succeeded by: Ğani Beisembaev

Personal details
- Born: 14 June 1982 (age 44) Aqsu-Aiuly, Kazakh SSR, Soviet Union
- Education: Karagandy State University; Karagandy Institute of Actual Education

Ashat Qanatūly Aimağambetov (Note: Often transliterated as Askhat Kanatovich Aimagambetov through a Russified Romanization of Асхат Канатович Aimagambetov.) (/ˈæshæt ˌaɪməˈɡæmbɛtɒf/; Kazakh: Асхат Қанатұлы Аймағамбетов, IPA: [ɑsˈχɑt qɑˌnɑtʊˈɫə ɑjmɑʁɑmˈbʲetəf]; born 14 June 1982) is a Kazakh politician who's currently serving as a Member of the Kurultai of the 1st convocation from the Ädilet party list.

Before, Aimagambetov served as a Member of the 8th Mäjilis and the Chairman of the Committee for Social and Cultural Development of the Mäjilis. He's mostly known for his work as the Minister of Education and Science of Kazakhstan from June 2019 to January 2023. On 11 June 2022, the ministry was split in two separate ones, and Aimağambetov lead the Ministry of Education until January 2023.

== Biography ==
=== Early life and education ===
Aimagambetov was born in the village of Aqsu-Aiuly in the Karaganda Region. In 2003 he graduated from the Karagandy State University with a degree in history. In 2006 he graduated from the Karagandy Institute of Actual Education with a degree in jurisprudence.

=== Career ===
From 2002 to 2004, Aimagambetov was an employee of the KarGU. In 2003, he became a member of the Karaganda City Maslihat where he served as a chairman of the Standing Commission on Social Issues.

In 2004, he became a chairman of the NGO Ansar League of Young and in 2005, the director of Media SP LLP.

From 2006 to 2012, Aimagambetov was a lecturer, senior lecturer, and associate professor of the Department of Political Science and Sociology of KarGU.

In 2012, he was appointed as a deputy akim of the Nurinsky District for Social Issues. From February 2014 to August 2017, Aimagambetov served as the head of the Education Department of the Karaganda Region until he became the Vice Minister of Education and Science.

On 17 January 2019, Aimagambetov became the deputy akim of Karaganda Region, he served that position until he was appointed as the Minister of Education and Science.

From 11 June 2022 to 4 January 2023, he served as the first Minister of Education.

Since February 2023, he is a lecturer at the KAZGUU University.

On 29 March 2023, he was officially sworn in as a Member of the Mäjilis. He was then placed as the Chairman of the Committee for Social and Cultural Development.

Following the 2026 Kazakh constitutional referendum that changed the national legislature from the bicameral Parliament of Kazakhstan to the unicameral Kurultai of Kazakhstan, the 2026 Kazakh legislative election took place, in the result of which Aimagambetov was sworn in as Member of the Kurultai from the Adilet party list on 27 August 2026.

== Controversies ==
=== Proposal on LGBT censorship law ===
In April 2024, Aimagambetov, with a fellow Mäjilisman Janarbek Äşimjanov, proposed to alter the "On mass media" law in a way that would prohibit the mentions of LGBT people throughout Kazakh mass media. Äşimjanov then claimed that this alteration would not censor information, but rather prohibit propaganda and the "imposing of biased information". It was also clarified that the change would not affect news-styled information about LGBT and would, rather, help to "stop the promotion of ideas that can cause division in society". It is notable that if this change were to be adopted, the law's new look would liken "LGBT propaganda" to "propaganda or agitation of the cult of cruelty and violence, social, racial, national, religious, class and clan superiority". Aimagambetov, unlike Äşimjanov, refused to comment on the proposal.

=== Resignation petition ===
On 6 February 2022, a group of activists in Kazakhstan launched a petition addressed to President Kassym-Jomart Tokayev demanding the resignation of the Minister of Education and Science of the Republic, Askhat Aimagambetov.

=== Doctoral dissertation plagiarism allegation ===
In 2020, Anar Kairbekova, former head of a department at the Ministry of Education and Science of the Republic of Kazakhstan, accused Askhat Aimagambetov of forgery and corruption. She conducted a study of Askhat Aimagambetov's doctoral dissertation and concluded that the minister's thesis, defended in 2009, had been rewritten and supplemented in 2019. By comparing the two works, Kairbekova discovered that the second version contained signs of manipulation and falsification of the original text, which Aimagambetov committed 10 years after defending his doctoral dissertation, while serving as head of the Ministry of Education and Science of the Republic of Kazakhstan.
