= Erlan Sairov =

Kazakh politician (born 1970)

- Ерлан Саиров
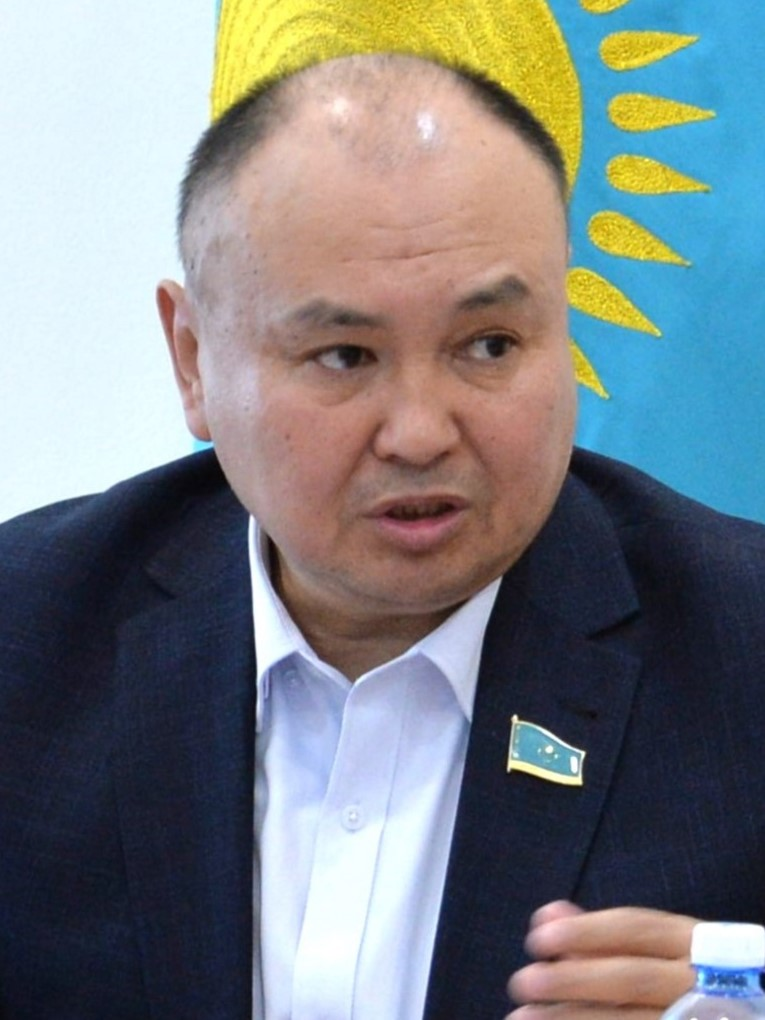
- Sairov in 2023

Member of the Mäjilis
- In office 15 January 2021 – 1 July 2026
- Party list: Amanat
Other membership positions
| Parliamentary group | Jaña Qazaqstan (2022–2023) |
Member of the National Kurultai
Incumbent
Assumed office 14 June 2022
| President | Kassym-Jomart Tokayev |
Member of the National Council of Public Trust
In office 17 July 2019 – 14 June 2022
| President | Kassym-Jomart Tokayev |

Personal details
- Born: Yerlan Biyakhmetovich Sairov; 25 June 1970 (age 56) East Kazakhstan Region, Kazakh SSR, Soviet Union
- Party: Amanat
- Children: 3
- Education: Sarsen Amanzholov East Kazakhstan State University; Russian Academy of State Service

Erlan Biahmetūly Sairov (Kazakh: Ерлан Биахметұлы Саиров, sometimes Сайыров; born 25 June 1970) is a Kazakh politician, who is serving as member of the Mäjilis from the Amanat party list since January 2021.

Sairov is known for being part of different controversies. In December 2025, after Sairov's protest to the movie Ruyñ Kım?, it was taken from theatre showings. Not long afterwards, the feud raised censorship concerns in Kazakhstan.

== Early life and education ==
Erlan Sairov was born on 25 June 1970, in East Kazakhstan Region. Sairov became a historian in Sarsen Amanzholov East Kazakhstan State University. Later, he finished his studies in the state and municipal administration faculty of the Russian Academy of State Service.

== Career ==
Sairov began his career in 2000, as the director of the department of Domestic policy of the Ministry of Culture, Information and Public Accord. He has held the position until 2003. From there, he led the "Kazengineering" JSC as executive director until 2005.

Sairov first started serving in the Mäjilis in 2005, as the head of its Information and Analytical Department. From 2008 to 2012, he was reappointed to the Ministry of Culture, Information and Public Accord as director of its Department of Public Political Work.

In the years between 2012 and 2013, Sairov was briefly the chairman of the editorial board of the republican weekly socio-political Ūlt TIMES (lit. 'Nation TIMES') newspaper. From there and until 2015, he held the position of scientific director of the "Institute of Cultural Development" Public Foundation.

In 2017, Sairov became an advisor to the Chairman of the Federation of Trade Unions of Kazakhstan (FTUK). On 27 December 2017, he was appointed Deputy Chairman during a meeting of the FTUK.

He held the position of Deputy Chairman of the FTUK until 2018. From 2019 to January 2021, Sairov was Director of the Eurasian Integration Institute.

Since 17 July 2019, Sairov has been a member of the National Council of Public Trust under the President. Since 14 June 2022, he has also been a member of the National Kurultai of Kazakhstan under the President.

=== Party work ===
On 28 January 2022, Sairov was appointed a member of the ruling Nur Otan party's political council. He has been a member of the Politburo of the party council since 31 January of the same year. Since April 2022, he has simultaneously been the head of the Republican Public Council for the Development of Public Administration and Combating Corruption of the Amanat party.

=== Mäjilis career ===
Erlan Sairov has been a deputy of the Mäjilis since 15 January 2021, through the Amanat party list. From February 2022, to 19 January 2023, he has been a member of the Jaña Qazaqstan parliamentary group (lit. 'New Kazakhstan').

As deputy of the 7th convocation of the Mäjilis of the Parliament of Kazakhstan, he was a member of the Committee on Foreign Affairs, Defense and Security of the Mäjilis from 2021 to 2023. As deputy of the 7th convocation since 2023, he is a member of the Committee for Social and Cultural Development.

Since February 2022, Sairov has been the Deputy Chairman and member of the Presidium of the Nur Otan party faction in the Mäjilis.

==== Controversies ====
During his Mäjilis career, Sairov has been known as a relatively controversial figure. In November 2022, he was seen spitting on the ground during a live interview, for which he was fined. In June 2023, while reminding the Parliament of the rising prices in Kazakhstan, he remarked that now banyas were visited less often by Kazakhstanis, adding himself to the category. This went viral and was criticised as unparliamentary.

In November 2025, the theatre showing of the comedic film Ruyñ Kım? was abruptly ended only a week after the premiere. This came shortly after Sairov's negative remarks regarding it in Parliament. Sairov viewed the comedy about the different Kazakh tribes as divisive, and harshly criticised it. The studio Tiger Films commented that the movie's closing was voluntary, but remarked that the movie was aimed to be satirical.

== Awards and honors ==
Sairov's awards and honors include:

- Medal for Distinguished Labor (2020)
- Order of Kurmet (2022)

== Personal life ==
Sairov is married, and has three children: two daughters and a son.
