= Baytaq =

Green political party in Kazakhstan

Baytaq Green Party: «Байтақ» жасылдар партиясы (Kazakh); Партия зелёных «Байтак» (Russian)
- Leader: Azamathan Ämirtai
- Founder: Azamathan Ämirtai
- Founded: 24 September 2022
- Registered: 28 November 2022
- Headquarters: Astana, Kabanbai Batyr St. 74
- Membership (2023): 21,000
- Ideology: Green politics; Pro-Tokayev reformism; Agrarianism
- Political position: Centre
- Colours: Green
- Slogan: Clean air, Clean water, Clean land — Clean human relations!
- Kurultai: 0 / 145

Website
- baytaq.kz

Logo of the party on its Astana headquarters

Baytaq (lit. 'Extensive' or 'Vast'), officially the "Baytaq" Green Party of Kazakhstan (Kazakh: Қазақстанның «Байтақ» жасылдар партиясы, romanized: Qazaqstannyñ «Baitaq» (Note: According to the last revision of the Kazakh alphabet, «Байтақ» is supposed to be romanised as «Baitaq», however the party officially spells its name as «Baytaq») jasyldar partiasy), is a green political party in Kazakhstan. The leader of the party is Azamathan Ämirtai, a former member of the National Kurultai under the President. Previously, he was a member of the Board of Directors of JSC National Managing Holding KazAgro and the National Council of Public Trust under the President.

== Ideology ==
The party states that it "strives to unite environmentalists and advocate for clean environmental conditions, responsible business, enterprise modernization, safe working conditions and other eco-initiatives". The party positions itself as the first green party in the history of Kazakhstan.

The party is not considered an opposition party. At the pre-election congress on 1 February 2023, the party expressed its support for the course of President Tokayev.

== History ==
According to the leader of the party, work on its registration has been carried out since 2015.

The founding congress of the party was held on 24 September 2022.

On 28 November 2022, the party was registered by the Ministry of Justice of Kazakhstan. The party has become the first registered party in Kazakhstan over the past 20 years, and the sixth after Amanat, Aq Jol, and People's Party, Auyl and JSDP.

In December 2022, the party announced that it would take part in the 2023 legislative election.

On 1 February 2023, the pre-election congress of the party was held, at which there was a scandal. Maral Koshenov, who came to the congress from Atyrau, said that he was on the list of nominated candidates when he was selected in the regions, but upon arrival in the capital he found out that he was "crossed out from the list". According to him, the son of the former deputy of the Mäjilis, Iraq Elekeev, was included in his place. At the congress, the head of the party said that it was necessary to prevent the party of oligarchs from entering the parliament, which he considers the Respublica and Aq Jol parties.

On 2 February 2023, the party was admitted to the regional elections of local assemblies (mäslihats) of the Abai, Akmola, Jetisu, North Kazakhstan and Ulytau regions.

== Elections results ==
=== Parliamentary elections ===
==== Majilis elections ====
Election	Party leader	Votes	%	Seats	+/–	Position	Outcome
2023	Azamathan Ämirtai	146,431	2.30%	0 / 98	New	7th	Extra-parliamentary

==== Kurultai elections ====
Election	Party leader	Votes	%	Seats	+/–	Position	Outcome
2026	Azamathan Ämirtai	97,751	1.07%	0 / 145	Steady	7th	Extra-parliamentary
