= Saryarqa District =

Coordinates: 51°12′N 71°20′E

Saryarqa District Сарыарқа Ауданы
- District of Astana
- Interactive map of Saryarqa District; Сарыарқа Ауданы
- Country: Kazakhstan
- Municipality: Astana

Government
  - Local mayor: Bauyrzhan Yeraly

Area
  - Total: 19,202 ha (47,450 acres)

Population (2014)
  - Total: 339,286
- District number: 3
- Website: Official website

Saryarqa District (Kazakh: Сарыарқа Ауданы, Saryarqa audany; Russian: Район Сарыарка) is an administrative subdivision of the city of Astana, Kazakhstan.

== Geography ==
Until March 16, 2018, the area of the district was 196.62 km^{2}, the territory of the district included interstitial plots, one of them had (according to the land cadastre) an area of 384.6 hectares and was located in the Koyandy tract to the west of the dacha massif (at that time the interstitial section of the Almaty district of Astana (at that time Astana), lying between highway Astana-Yerementau and the Koyandy reservoir.

On February 7, 2018, a 460-hectare cross-strip plot intended for the placement of the city cemetery was transferred to the district from the territory of the Tselinograd district of Akmola Region.

On March 16, 2018, most of the district 's territory was transferred to the newly formed Baikonur district and reduced to 67.75 km^{2}.
