= Salimzhan Nakpaev =

Kazakhstani mayor

Salimzhan Zhumashuly Nakpaev (Kazakh: Сәлімжан Жұмашұлы Нақпаев [sælɪmˈʑɑn ʑʊmɑɕʊˈlə nɑqˈpɑjəf], Sälımjan Jūmaşūly Naqpaev; Russian: Салимжан Жумашевич Накпаев [səlʲɪmˈʐan ʐʊˈmaʂɪvʲɪtɕ nɐˈkpaɪf]), born in 1966, had served as the mayor of Atyrau, the capital of the Atyrau Province since 2006 to 2009.

== Education and career ==
After graduating from the Almaty Institution of National Economy with a degree in economics, Nakpaev began his professional life in 1983 as an engineer in the Makat District. After his service in the Soviet Army, he returned to his previous post where he worked for more than four years.

From 1989 to 1992, Nakpaev worked as an economist on the regional planning committee. Following that, he worked as the chairman of the small enterprise, Maksat, an assistant to the head of the Makat District administration, and the chairman of the economic committee. From 2000 to 2003, Nakpaev served as the akim of the Makat District. From March 2003, Nakpaev was the manager of the executive board of the akim of the Atyrau Province. From January 2005, he was the akim of the Zhylyoi District of the Atyrau Province. In February 2006, he became the assistant to the akim of the Atyrau Province, and in October of the same year, the mayor of the city of Atyrau.
