= Kazakh National Women's Teacher Training University =

Women-only Kazakhstani higher education institution

Coordinates: 43°15′30.1″N 76°55′49.7″E

- Қазақ ұлттық қыздар педагогикалық университеті
- Type: National
- Established: 1944
- Rector: Dr Gulmira Qanay
- Administrative staff: 595
- Location: Aiteke Bi, 99, Almaty, Kazakhstan
- Campus: urban
- Website: https://qyzpu.edu.kz/en/

University rankings

Regional – Overall
- QS Emerging Europe and Central Asia: 401-450 (2022)

The Kazakh National Women's Teacher Training University (Kazakh: Қазақ ұлттық қыздар педагогикалық университеті, romanized: Qazaq ūlttyq qyzdar pedagogikalyq universitetı) is a women-only Kazakhstani higher education institution in Almaty.

== History ==
The university was founded on 15 August 1944. The basis for its opening was the resolution of the Council of People's Commissars of the Kazakh SSR No. 457 "On the training of qualified pedagogical personnel from among the Kazakh female youth." Initially, it included three faculties: physics and mathematics, history, language and literature. In 1945, the Faculty of Natural Geography was opened, in 1968: the Faculty of Music and Song. In 1971, the Faculty of Language and Literature was transformed into a Philological Faculty, and the Faculty of History into History and Pedagogy. In 1984, the Faculty of History and Education was divided into the Faculty of History and the Faculty of Preschool Education.

After 1954, the question of closing the institute was raised several times, since it allegedly fulfilled its purpose, but the Kazakh SSR authorities decided to keep the university.

In 2000, as part of the institute, there were historical-philological and economic faculties, as well as faculties of natural history and educational services. Since 2003, the university has published its own newspaper named Aqtoty.

Since 2004, within the framework of the State Program for the Development of Education for 2005–2010, an original quality management system has been introduced at the institute and the transition to a credit system of education, as well as to a two-stage training system "bachelor's - master's", has begun. In the ranking of the National Accreditation Center under the Ministry of Education and Science of the Republic of Kazakhstan, the university has been ranked second among pedagogical educational institutions since 2006.

By the Decree of the President of the Republic of Kazakhstan No. 805 of 25 December 2018, the Kazakh State Women's Teacher Training University was given the status of National.

== Structure ==
Scientific research at the university is carried out by 32 departments, a research institute for social and gender studies, a fundamental research center and 3 research laboratories.

Faculties:

- Faculty of Culture and Art
- Social and Humanitarian Faculty
- Faculty of Natural Sciences
- Faculty of Philology
- Faculty of Physics and Mathematics
- Faculty of Pedagogy and Psychology

Today the university employs over 700 teachers.

The university has a vocal and instrumental ensemble "Aigul", an opera studio "Oner Zhastan", a laureate of international competitions, folklore and ethnographic ensemble "Ular", vocal and dance groups "Tomiris" and "Yerkenaz".

== Campus ==
The educational building specially for the Women's Teacher Training University was built in 1954 by the architect V. Biryukov and engineer V. Brandt. It is located at Gogol Street, 114.

After the construction of a new building at Aiteke bi Street, 99, the administration and a number of departments were transferred to it. The new building was built on the back of the historic building.

== Architecture ==
The building is an architectural monument, built in classic style characteristics using national Kazakh motives. The construction in the volumetric-planning composition of a 3-story, rectangular building was designed in the classicist traditions. The main entrance, located along the central axis of the structure in the projection, is accentuated by a portico flanked by pylons. The first floor is designed as a basement, rusticated. Throughout the projection, the plane of the wall of the first floor is dissected by pilasters that serve as supports for the columns of the portico. The composition solution of the facades is based on the horizontal rhythm of paired window openings. Along the perimeter of the building runs a multi-profile cornice with a small extension, decorated with elements of Soviet symbols and national ornamentation.

=== Monument status ===
On 10 November 2010, a new State List of Historical and Cultural Monuments of the Local Significance of the city of Almaty was approved, simultaneously with which all previous decisions on this matter were declared invalid. In this Resolution, the status of a local monument of the university building was preserved. The boundaries of the protected zones were approved in 2014.
