= Dinara Naumova =

Kazakhstani politician

MP Dinara Naumova
- Динара Наумова
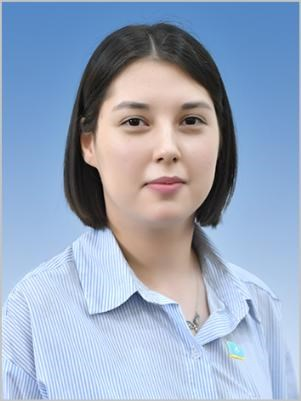
- Official Mäjılıs portrait, 2023

Member of the Kurultai
- Incumbent
- Assumed office 27 August 2026
- Constituency: Respublica Party list

Member of the Mäjılıs
- In office 29 March 2023 – 1 July 2026

Personal details
- Born: 8 September 1997 (age 29) Astana, Kazakhstan
- Party: Respublica
- Education: Nazarbayev University

Dinara Rustamqyzy Naumova (Kazakh: Динара Рустамқызы Наумова; born 8 September 1997) is a Kazakh politician who has served as a member of the Kurultai from the Respublica party list since 27 August 2026.

Before this, Naumova served as a member of the Mäjılıs from 29 March 2023 to 1 June 2026.
