= Aidarbek Qojanazarov =

Kazakh politician

- Айдарбек Қожаназаров
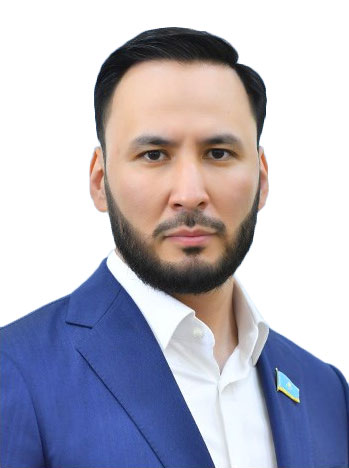
- Official portrait, 2023

Member of the Mäjilis
- In office 29 March 2023 – 1 July 2026
- Succeeded by: Office abolished

Personal details
- Born: Aidarbek Asanūly Qojanazarov; 26 November 1983 (age 42) Kyzylorda, Kazakh SSR, Soviet Union
- Party: Respublica (since 2022)
- Spouse: Indira Bugzhanova
- Children: 3
- Education: Ryskulov Kazakh International Economic University; University of Dundee

Aidarbek Asanūly Qojanazarov (Note: Often transliterated as Aydarbek Asanovich Khodzhanazarov through a Russified Romanization of Айдарбек Асанович Ходжаназаров.) (Kazakh: Айдарбек Асанұлы Қожаназаров; born 26 November 1983) is a Kazakh businessman and politician who is currently serving as leader of the Respublica Party since its inception in 2022. He previously served as a Deputy of the Mäjilis of the VIII convocation from 2023 to 2026 and CEO of Olzha Agro (2019 – March 2023) and Ivolga Holding (2017–2019).

== Biography ==
Qojanazarov was born in Kyzylorda on 26 November 1983, to a family of educators. His mother Rosa Smaiylova (born 6 March 1962) taught mathematics at school, while his father Asan Qojanazarov (born 15 May 1955) held a PhD in Chemistry and was a university lecturer. Aidarbek's name was suggested by his grandfather to commemorate his younger brother Aidarbek Qojanazarov who perished in the Second World War.

Having graduated from a secondary school in Kostanay, Qojanazarov went on to receive a diploma from the Ryskulov Kazakh International Economic University, with a specialty in "International Economics", and Dundee University, majoring in Oil and Gas Project Management.

From 2006 to 2009, Qojanazarov worked for BTA Bank, first as the Head of the Islamic Banking Division and later as the Head of the Dubai Representative Office.

From 2009 to 2015, he held executive positions at Olzha Holding in areas of strategy and business development.

From 2015 to 2016, Qojanazarov served as deputy chairman at KazAgro National Managing Holding.

From 2016 to 2017, Qojanazarov served as the Chairman of the Astana Social Entrepreneurial Corporation.

Qojanazarov led Ivolga Holding as CEO between December 2017 and 2019.

Between February 2019 and March 2023, he led Olzha Agro, considered the largest agribusiness company in Kazakhstan, and as its CEO bolstered the company's operations and financial performance.

Since 2020 he has served as Chairman of the Regional Council in the Kostanay Region.

In 2022, Qojanazarov headed the Respublica, a new political party established the same year, but only registered in January 2023. On 28 March 2023, he was elected a Deputy of the Mäjilis of the Parliament of Kazakhstan of the VIII convocation from the Respublica party.

== Public activities ==
Qojanazarov is a former President of the Triathlon Federation of the Kostanay Region.

In 2019, Aidarbek was elected President of the Jiu-jitsu and Grappling Federations of the Kostanay Region.

== Personal life ==
Qojanazarov is married to Indira Qojanazarova (née Bugzhanova; born 4 April 1990). They have 2 sons, Imangali (born 18 September 2012) and Dinmuhamed (born 25 April 2014), and a daughter, Dameli (born 19 September 2012).

== Awards ==
- In 2017, he was awarded the medal Eren Eńbegi Ushin;
- In 2020, he was awarded the medal Halyk Algysy (for assistance in the fight against the COVID-19 pandemic in Kazakhstan);
- In 2021, he was awarded the medal for 30 years of Independence of the Republic of Kazakhstan;
- In 2022, he was made a knight of the Order of Kurmet.
