= Azamathan Ämirtai =

Kazakh politician

Azamathan Ämırtai
- Азаматхан Әміртай
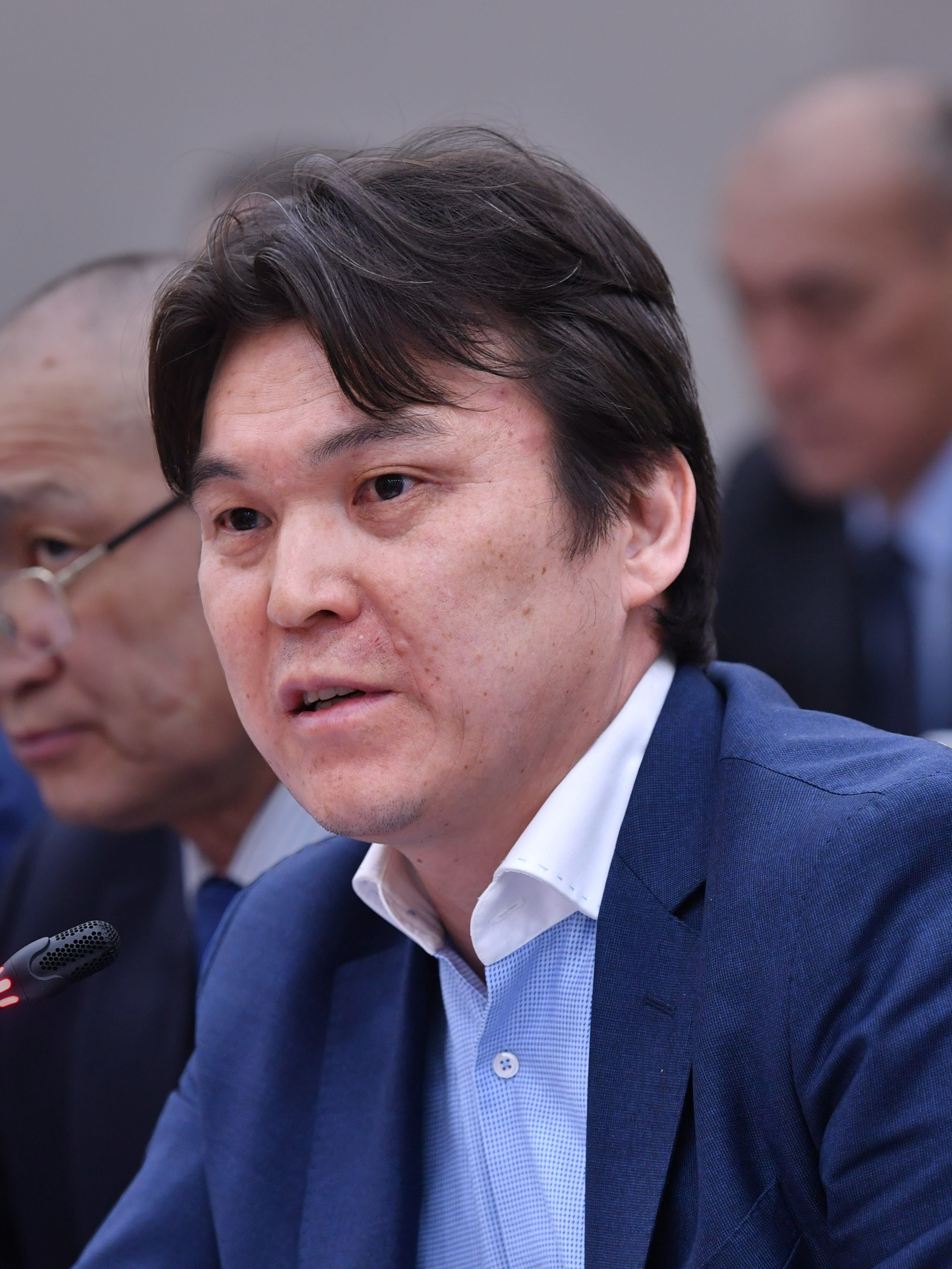
- Ämirtai in 2023

Chairman of Baytaq
- Incumbent
- Assumed office 26 April 2022
- Preceded by: Position established

Member of the National Kurultai
- Incumbent
- Assumed office 15 June 2022
- President: Kassym-Jomart Tokayev

Personal details
- Born: 21 March 1978 (age 48) Dzhambul Oblast, Kazakh SSR, Soviet Union
- Party: Baytaq
- Children: 4

Azamathan Sailaūly Ämırtai (Kazakh: Азаматхан Сайлауұлы Әміртай, sometimes Ämırtaev, (Note: Often transliterated as Amirtayev through a Russified Romanization of Амиртаев.) born 21 March 1978) is a Kazakh politician, businessman, founder and chairman of the Baytaq political party.

== Biography ==
Azamathan Ämirtai was born in Jambyl Region on March 21, 1978.

In 2012, his child fell ill, developed severe allergies and diathesis, and died. Although at that time Ämirtai was engaged in business and had money for treatment, it did not save the child. After this tragic event, Amirtay quit his business in 2013 and began his social activities. He sold his property and invested the money in creation of the Party.

In 2017, as the chairman of Baytaq, Ämirtai launched a project to plant 18 million trees across Kazakhstan to celebrate the birth of the country's 18 millionth resident.

In 2023, Ämirtai presented Diana Murzagalieva, a 16-year-old environmental activist from Semey, as the party's spokesperson. Diana stands up for environmental protection in Kazakhstan and previously launched "Academy of Inclusion", a project to teach special children. Now she is promoting the green party.

== Education ==
Ämırtai studied Computer Science at Almaty Institute of Energy and Communications with honours from 1995 to 2000. He was at the Kazakh National Agrarian University, where he studied State Local Governance with honors from 2004 to 2005.

Ämırtai studied at Moscow School of Management SKOLKOVO, receiving an Executive MBA from 2015 to 2016.

== Career ==
Azamathan Ämirtai started his career in the IT industry in 1995. He worked as Director of Kaznewtech LLP (2001–2005), and Advisor to the First Vice-president on Digitalization of JSC NC Kazakhstan Temir Zholy (2005–2006);

Ämırtai was an Advisor to the President on Digitalization of JSC NC Kazakhstan Temir Zholy (2007–2009) and President of the Kazakhstan Association of Software Companies (2008–2014).

He was President of the Public Association Alliance of Investors (private equity funds) and Member of the Regional Council of Astana Chamber of Entrepreneurs (2014–2016).

Since 2016, Ämirtai has been the President of Republican Civic Association Baytaq Bolashaq.

Ämırtai was a Member of the National Council of Public Trust from 17 July 2019 to March 2020. He was later a Board Member at KazAgro National Managing Holding (KZAG) from 2020 to 2021.

Ämırtai was Member of the National Kurultai under the President from June 2022.
