= Däulet Muqaev =

Kazakh economist, blogger, journalist (born 1992)

- Дәулет Мұқаев
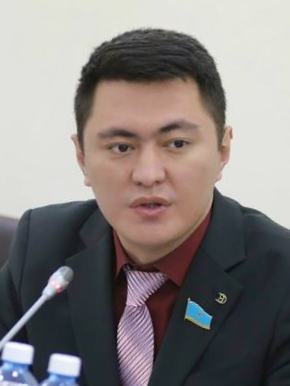
- Muqaev in 2023

Member of the Mäjilis
- In office 29 March 2023 – 1 July 2026
- Preceded by: Constituency reestablished; Tölegen Muhamedjanov (2007)
- Constituency: Astana, No. 2

Personal details
- Born: 4 May 1992 (age 34) Semey, Kazakhstan
- Party: Amanat (2022–present)
- Other political affiliations: Adal (2020–2022)
- Children: 3
- Education: Al-Farabi Kazakh National University
- Website: dauletten.kz

Däulet Töleutaiūly Mūqaev (Note: Often transliterated as Daulet Toleutayevich Mukayev through a Russified Romanization of Даулет Толеутаевич Мукаев.) (Kazakh: Дәулет Төлеутайұлы Мұқаев; born 4 May 1992), also known as Däuletten (Kazakh: Дәулеттен, lit. 'From Däulet') is a Kazakh economist, blogger, and journalist who is currently serving as a member of the Mäjilis since 2023.

== Early life and career ==
Born to a family belonging to the Naiman tribe in Semey, East Kazakhstan Region (now Abai Region), Muqaev embarked on his academic pursuits at Al-Farabi Kazakh National University (KazNU) graduating in 2013 with a degree in State and Local Administration (Bachelor of Economic Sciences), followed by a master's degree in Innovation Management in 2015.

Throughout his career, Muqaev held significant roles in media and television, showcasing his expertise and creativity. From 2010 to 2015, he served as an expert for the prestigious intellectual competition Leader of the XXI Century and worked as an editor for the EL ARNA channel. From 2011 to 2013, he further honed his skills as a guest editor for television programs like Bağdarşam and Birlim birlim jarasqan channels EL ARNA and Khabar Agency.

In the years that followed, Muqaev expanded his impact, serving as a lecturer at the Department of Management and Marketing of the KazNU from 2015 to 2016. Subsequently, in 2017 to 2018, he showcased his creativity as a producer for the Balapan TV channel and as a creative producer of the acclaimed program Dara Bala.

From 2019 to 2021, Daulet took on the role of host and author. He was seen in programs Baspanağa bağyt and Bizneske bağyt on Khabar Agency.

== Political career ==
Muqaev's involvement in politics began in late 2020, when he joined the Adal (formerly Birlik) party. As a member of the political council, he ran for the lower chamber Mäjilis in the 2021 legislative election as an Adal candidate from the party-list. Throughout his electoral campaign, Muqaev placed significant emphasis on addressing the pressing issue of housing in Kazakhstan. He advocated for reducing mortgage percentages based on the number of children in family, recognizing that affordable housing is essential for the country's development and prosperity. In a subsequent result, the Adal party was unable to secure any seats in the parliament.

In April 2022, the Adal merged with the ruling Amanat party. As part of this merger, former Adal party member Muqaev joined the political council of the Amanat. From there, he was appointed to the membership of the Amanat party's Republican Family and People's Social Protection Public Council. Muqaev cited the need to contribute positive changes in creating a new Kazakhstan through a merger of both parties and address important issues for the people in which he insisted that the Amanat party would provide him with opportunities to address fundamental problems and make a difference in areas like finance and education. He also asserted that the Adal was not an "opposition party".

=== Mäjilis ===
After assuming office as deputy of the 8th convocation of Mäjilis in March 2023, Muqaev became a member of the Committee on Social and Cultural Development.

==== 2023 legislative election ====
In a May 2022 interview with Adyrna.kz, Muqaev initially ruled out interest in running as a deputy in the next legislative election due to lack of public service experience and instead expressed his desire to serve as a "bridge between two environments." However, in February 2023, Muqaev officially declared his candidacy during the 2023 election as an independent for the Mäjilis, running in Electoral district No. 2, Astana due to high interest and requests by his supporters. In his campaign, Muqaev affirmed his AMANAT party membership while noting his self-nomination in the election and insisted that he was not tying "heart to money" in trying to become lawmaker to represent the interests of young generation. He also raised the issue of an exodus of skilled medical professionals from Kazakhstan and dissatisfaction with the national health insurance.

Muqaev defeated his main independent opponent, Arman Şoraev, winning 51,769 votes. This led a backlash from Şoraev who disputed the official election results, resulting in Muqaev responding by outlining his extensive campaign meetings, as well as election observers in polling stations and criticizing Şoraev for being more active on social media covering the Russian invasion of Ukraine rather than campaigning.

== Charity work ==
Muqaev, widely known by his online pseudonym Däuletten, is a Kazakhstani blogger and philanthropist who has gained prominence for his charitable initiatives and public engagement. In 2020, he founded the Dauletten charitable foundation, which has provided housing for 57 families in Kazakhstan since its establishment.

In addition to his domestic work, Muqaev has participated in international charitable efforts. In 2021, Kazakh media reported on his fundraising campaign that supplied drinking water to a village in Gambia.

As a blogger, he uses his platform to promote government housing programs, encourage entrepreneurship, and advance financial literacy within the Kazakh-speaking community. His commentary and advice have earned him recognition as an influential voice on these topics. Muqaev has also built a large following on social media, with more than 2.4 million Instagram subscribers, making him one of the most popular Kazakh language bloggers on the platform.

== Honours ==
Ribbon bar	Honour	Date
	For Labour Distinction	15 December 2020
