= Irina Smirnova (politician) =

Kazakhstani politician (born 1960)

- Ирина Смирнова
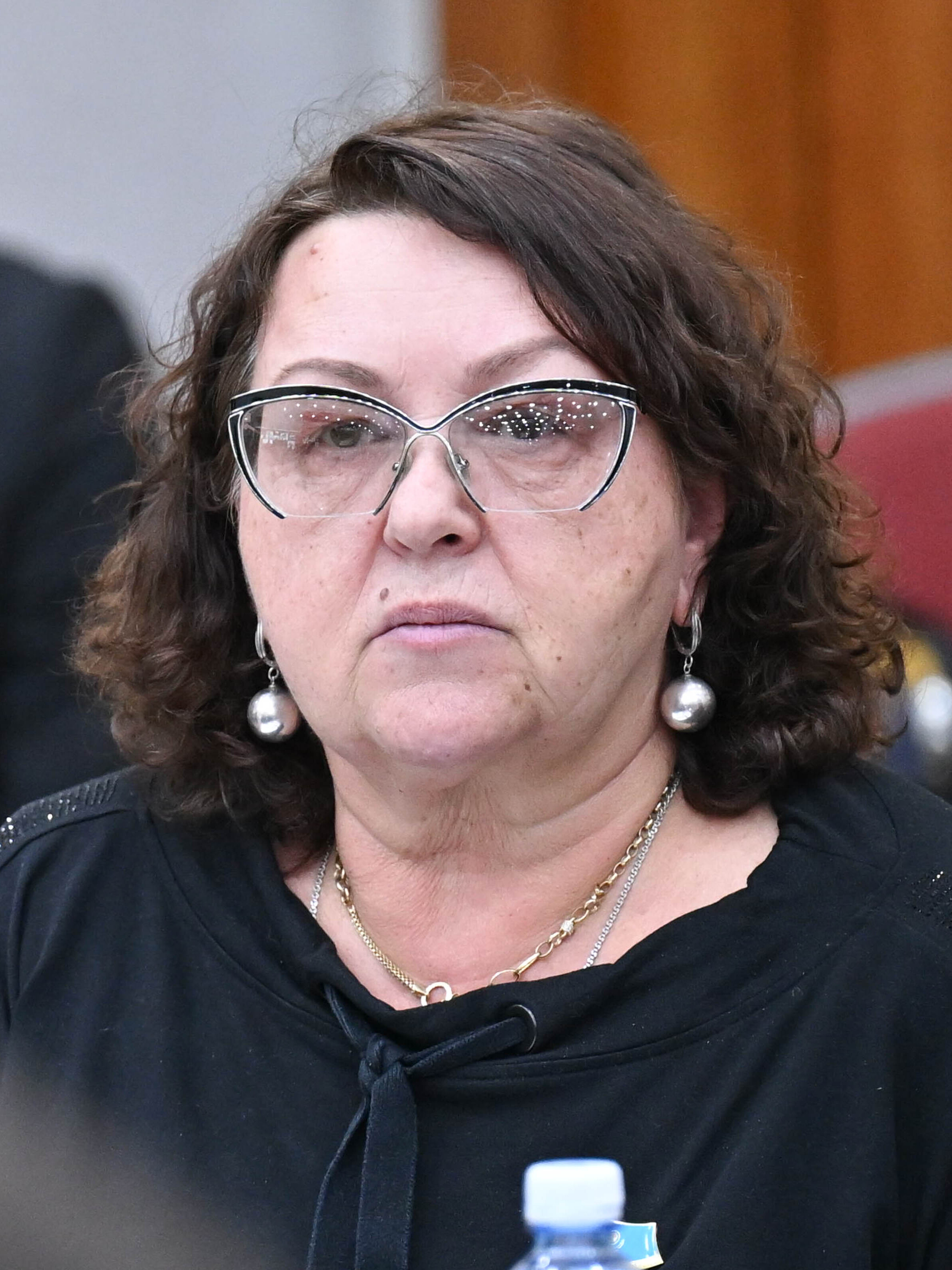
- Smirnova in 2024

Member of the Mäjilis
- In office 20 March 2016 – 1 July 2026

Personal details
- Born: 21 July 1960 (age 66) Issyk-Kul Region, Kyrgyz SSR, Soviet Union
- Party: People's Party
- Education: Abai Kazakh National Pedagogical University

Irina Vladimirovna Smirnova (Russian: Ирина Владимировна Смирнова; born 21 July 1960) is a Kazakh politician, who is a member of the Mäjilis from the People's Party of Kazakhstan (QHP) since 2016.

== Biography ==
=== Early life and career ===
Smirnova was born in the Issyk-Kul Region of present-day Kyrgyzstan. In 1983, she graduated from the Abai Kazakh National Pedagogical University while she taught biology at the Jambyl Regional School No. 22 from 1979. From 1983, she was a laboratory assistant at the Research Institute of Agriculture of the USSR Ministry of Agriculture before returning to the School No. 22 to teach biology and being an organizer of extracurricular and freelance work in school.

From 1991, Smirnova worked as an organizer of extracurricular and freelance work, deputy director for teaching and educational work, director of the Ruzaevskaya Secondary School before becoming the deputy director of the Almaty Secondary School No. 91 in 1993. For 20 years, she worked as the director of the several schools in Almaty starting from 1996 in the Secondary School No. 68, then at School House No. 9 and School-Lyceum No. 48.

=== Political career ===
Smirnova became a candidate for the Communist People's Party of Kazakhstan (QKHP) in the 2016 Kazakh legislative election. After becoming a member of the Mäjilis, Smirnova served in the Finance and Budget Committee.

In an interview to KazTAG, Smirnova expressed her support for free education, saying it would be possible in Kazakhstan to work if high-quality secondary education and academic honesty in universities exists.

In January 2021, after being re-elected, Smirnova at the People's Party of Kazakhstan (QHP) congress, proposed her candidacy to the post of the Prime Minister of Kazakhstan where she criticized Askar Mamin's government by claiming that it's cut off from the people and doesn't know what the country wants.
