= Jaña Qazaqstan (parliamentary group, 2022) =

New Kazakhstan Jaña Qazaqstan
- Co-chair(s): Aidos Sarym; Edil Jañbyrşin; Natalia Dementyeva
- Founded: 9 February 2022
- Dissolved: 19 January 2023
- Ideology: Reformism; Pro-Tokayev
- Political position: Big tent
- Mäjilis (February 2022): 31 / 107

Jaña Qazaqstan (Kazakh: Жаңа Қазақстан, lit. 'New Kazakhstan') was a parliamentary group in the Mäjilis existing during the 7th convocation from 2022 to 2023. Its formation was a response to President Kassym-Jomart Tokayev's reform initiatives following the January Events.

The Jaña Qazaqstan group advocated for accountability regarding the January Events, pushed for the renaming of the Kazakh capital back to Astana, and spearheaded efforts to repeal legislation granting immunity to former president Nursultan Nazarbayev, engaging in constructive dialogue with the government and actively participating in the development of essential legislative proposals in the Mäjilis. Additionally, the group established channels for collaboration with non-profit organizations and activists.

== History ==
Following the January Events, President Kassym-Jomart Tokayev introduced the political concept of New Kazakhstan in his subsequent speech to the parliament. This vision aimed to signal a shift towards societal renewal and progressive reforms in Kazakhstan. Consequently, the name Jaña Qazaqstan, meaning "New Kazakhstan" in Kazakh, was established as parliamentary group consisting of 31 deputies in the lower house Mäjilis on 9 February 2022, aligning closely with President Tokayev's vision. According to deputy Edil Jañbyrşin, the Jaña Qazaqstan group would be involved in addressing pressing issues by actively raising current concerns, collaborating closely with the government, contributing to the development of essential legislation, and working closely with non-profit organizations and activists, and implementing the reforms outlined by Tokayev.

On 10 February 2022, during a press conference, it was announced that the parliamentary group would include three subgroups led by co-chairs, deputies Edil Jañbyrşin, heading the first subgroup focusing on agriculture, economics, and ecology; Aidos Sarym, overseeing the subgroup on human rights, security, and legal reform; and Natalia Dementyeva, leading the subgroup on socio-cultural development and youth. From there, Sarym also rejected the idea of forming Jana Qazaqstan group as a separate political party or a faction split within the ruling Nur Otan party. Instead, he advocated for reforming Nur Otan, highlighting the party's extensive presence with branches in every village and its significant influence as a "great force".

The Jaña Qazaqstan group in the Mäjilis has emphasized various projects during its tenure, notably requesting detailed progress reports from the Prosecutor General's Office regarding investigations into crimes committed during the January Events of 2022.

In September 2022, the parliamentary group supported President Tokayev's proposal to change the presidential term from five years to a non-renewable seven-year term, contingent upon its adoption prior to the snap presidential election of 2022. Additionally, the Jaña Qazaqstan group proposed the initiative to rename the capital from Nur-Sultan back to Astana. Subsequently, the constitutional amendments were unanimously ratified by the Mäjilis deputies and signed into law by Tokayev.

In October 2022, the Jaña Qazaqstan deputies lodged a complaint with Chief Prosecutor General Berik Asylov against businessman Ramil Mukhoryapov for his derogatory remarks about the Kazakh language, urging legal action to address the issue, which they perceived as a provocation harming the country's interests.

During the Jaña Qazaqstan group meeting on 5 January 2023 with the leadership of Samruk-Kazyna, with discussions focused on proposals including support for publishing houses creating domestic Kazakh language content, implementation of projects aiding parents of children with special needs, singles, orphans, and disabled children, measures to support ethnic Kazakh diaspora abroad, and fostering an inclusive environment, among others.

In January 2023, the parliamentary group challenged the status of the Law "On the First President of the Republic of Kazakhstan – Elbasy" which granted immunity former president Nursultan Nazarbayev at the Constitutional Court of Kazakhstan following its repeal in the 2022 referendum, resulting in a ruling favoring the Jaña Qazaqstan group deputies, with the legislation officially repealed by the Parliament.

The Jaña Qazaqstan group disbanded following the dissolution of the Mäjilis of the 7th Parliament of Kazakhstan on 19 January 2023, as part of President Tokayev's reforms and the broader political transition within Kazakhstan, leading to the election of new deputies and the formation of the composition of the 8th Parliament of Kazakhstan.

== Deputy group chairs ==
Deputy group co-chairs
Name	Term start	Term end	Notes
Aidos Sarym	10 February 2022	19 January 2023	Member of Amanat
Edil Jañbyrşin	10 February 2022	19 January 2023	Member of Amanat
Natalia Dementyeva	10 February 2022	19 January 2023	Member of QHP
