= Respublica (Kazakh political party) =

Respublica Party «Республика» партиясы
- Leader: Aidarbek Qojanazarov
- Founder: Aidarbek Qojanazarov
- Founded: 3 December 2022
- Registered: 18 January 2023
- Ideology: Social market economy; Open government; E-democracy; Pro-Tokayev reformism; Youth politics
- Political position: Centre to centre-right
- Colours: Blue
- Slogan: Жаңа Адамдар – Жаңа Қадамдар ('New People – New Steps')
- Kurultai: 9 / 145

Website
- respublica-partiyasy.kz

The Respublica Party (Kazakh: «Республика» партиясы, romanized: «Respublika» partiasy) is a political party in Kazakhstan, which was officially registered on 18 January 2023.

== History ==
The creation of the party was announced in August 2022. The party's founding congress was held on 3 December 2022. An agricultural producer, the head of the Olzha Agro company, Aidarbek Qojanazarov, became the chairman of the party. The co-chairs are entrepreneurs Syrymbek Tau, Ruslan Berdenov, Maxim Baryshev, Dinara Shukizhanova, Kuanysh Shonbai, Beibit Alibekov and Nurlan Koyanbaev.

On 18 January 2023, the Respublica party received registration documents.

On 25 January, the first regional branch was opened in the Kostanay Region. On 27 January, all 20 regional divisions of the party received registration.

== Ideology ==
The aim of the party is to create levers of influence on the country's politics, so that every citizen of Kazakhstan feels involvement in political, social and economic changes.

== Opinions ==
Kazakh political scientists Rakhim Oshakbaev and Gaziz Zhaparov positively assessed the party's chances of winning in the snap Kazakh parliamentary elections, which were scheduled for 19 March 2023. It ultimately won around 11% of the vote, finishing in third place.

== Election results ==
=== Parliamentary elections ===
==== Mäjilis elections ====
Election	Party leader	Votes	%	Seats	+/–	Position	Outcome
2023	Aidarbek Qojanazarov	547,154	10.90%	6 / 98	New	3rd	Opposition

==== Kurultai elections ====
Election	Party leader	Votes	%	Seats	+/–	Position	Outcome
2026	Aidarbek Qojanazarov	509,631	5.56%	9 / 145	▲3	3rd	TBA
