= 5th Parliament of Kazakhstan =

Parliament of the Republic of Kazakhstan of the 5th convocation
←	4th Parliament of Kazakhstan	6th Parliament of Kazakhstan	→

Overview
- Legislative body: Parliament of Kazakhstan
- Meeting place: Parliament Building; Astana, Kazakhstan
- Term: 20 January 2012 – 20 January 2016
- Election: 15 January 2012

Mazhilis
- Members: 107
- Chair: Nurlan Nigmatulin; Kabibulla Dzhakupov
- Deputy Chair: Baktykozha Izmukhambetov; Sergey Dyachenko; Kabibulla Dzhakupov; Dariga Nazarbayeva; Abai Tasbolatov
- Party control: Nur Otan (83)

The Mäjilis of the Parliament of the Republic of Kazakhstan of the 5th convocation (Kazakh: Бесінші шақырылған Қазақстан Республикасы Парламенті Мәжілісі, romanized: Besınşı şaqyrylğan Qazaqstan Respublikasy Parlamentı Mäjılısı; Russian: Мажилис Парламента Республики Казахстан пятого созыва) was the legislative term of the lower house Mäjilis of the Parliament of Kazakhstan which was held from 20 January 2012, until its dissolution on 20 January 2016. The convocation was succeeded by the 6th Mazhilis on 25 March 2016.

The 5th Mäjilis was formed after the 2012 Kazakh legislative election which took place on 15 January 2012 where 98 members of the Mäjilis were elected based on the party list through proportional representation, while the 9 seats are reserved to the indirectly elected members of the Assembly of People.

== Structure ==
Office	MP	Term	Party
Chair	Nurlan Nigmatulin	20 January 2012 — 3 April 2014	Nur Otan
Chair	Kabibulla Dzhakupov	3 April 2014 — 20 January 2016	Nur Otan
Deputy Chair	Sergey Dyachenko	20 January 2012 — 20 January 2016	Nur Otan
Deputy Chair	Baktytkozha Izmukhambetov	20 January 2012 — 15 August 2012	Nur Otan
Deputy Chair	Kabibulla Dzhakupov	3 September 2012 — 3 April 2014	Nur Otan
Deputy Chair	Dariga Nazarbayeva	3 April 2014 — 11 September 2015	Nur Otan
Deputy Chair	Abai Tasbolatov	11 September 2015 — 20 January 2016	Nur Otan
Faction leaders	Nurlan Nigmatulin	20 January 2012 — 3 April 2014	Nur Otan
Faction leaders	Dariga Nazarbayeva	3 April 2014 — 11 September 2015	Nur Otan
Faction leaders	Kabibulla Dzhakupov	11 September 2015 — 20 January 2016	Nur Otan
Faction leaders	Azat Peruashev	20 January 2012 — 20 January 2016	Ak Zhol
Faction leaders	Vladislav Kosarev	20 January 2012 — 20 January 2016	QKHP

== Members ==
Party	Name
Nur Otan	Abai Tasbolatov
Assembly of People	Ahmet Muradov
Nur Otan	Aigül Nurkina
Nur Otan	Aigül Soloveva
Communist People's Party	Aiqyn Qongyrov
Nur Otan	Aitkül Samaqova
Nur Otan	Aldan Smaiyl
Nur Otan	Aleksandr Milyutin
Nur Otan	Älıhan Toibaev
Ak Zhol Democratic Party	Almas Tūrtaev
Nur Otan	Anatoli Makovsky
Nur Otan	Anatoli Pepenin
Nur Otan	Andrei Begeneev
Nur Otan	Arman Qojahmetov
Nur Otan	Ashat Bekenov
Nur Otan	Asqar Bazarbaev
Ak Zhol	Azamat Äbıldaev
Ak Zhol	Azat Peruashev
Nur Otan	Baqytbek Smağūl
Nur Otan	Bakhytzhan Ertaev
Communist People's Party	Boris Sorokin
Nur Otan	Dariga Nazarbayeva
Assembly of People	Egor Kappel
Ak Zhol	Ekaterina Nikitinskaya
Nur Otan	Elena Tarasenko
Nur Otan	Ergen Doşaev
Nur Otan	Erkın Şpanov
Nur Otan	Ersūltan Bektūrğanov
Communist People's Party	Galina Baimahanova
Nur Otan	Gleb Shegelsky
Nur Otan	Güljana Qarağūsova
Nur Otan	Gülmira Esimbaeva
Nur Otan	Gülnar Seiıtmağanbetova
Nur Otan	Gülnar Yqsanova
Nur Otan	İdiristıŋ Kuttojy
Nur Otan	Irina Aronova
Nur Otan	İzbaq Ömırzaqov
Nur Otan	Jalğas Düisenğaliev
Communist People's Party	Jambyl Ahmetbekov
Nur Otan	Janat Jarasov
Nur Otan	Jeksenbai Düisebaev
Assembly of People	Jūmatai Äliev
Nur Otan	Kabibulla Dzhakupov
Nur Otan	Kamal Burhanov
Nur Otan	Maira Aisina
Nur Otan	Mäulen Äşimbaev
Nur Otan	Meiram Begentaev
Nur Otan	Meiram Pişembaev
Ak Zhol	Meruert Qazbekova
Nur Otan	Mūhtar Tinikeev
Assembly of People	Mūrat Ahmadiev
Assembly of People	Nadezhda Nesterova
Nur Otan	Nadezhda Petukhova
Nur Otan	Nikolai Kuzmin
Nur Otan	Nikolai Logutov
Nur Otan	Nūrğali Äşım
Nur Otan	Nurlan Äbdirov
Ak Zhol	Nūrlan Jazylbekov
Nur Otan	Nurlan Nigmatulin
Nur Otan	Nūrtai Sabilianov
Nur Otan	Olga Kikolenko
Nur Otan	Olga Shishigina
Nur Otan	Omarhan Öksikbaev
Nur Otan	Oŋalsyn Jūmabekov
Nur Otan	Oral Muhamedjanov
Nur Otan	Orazkül Asanğazy
Nur Otan	Qaiyrbek Süleimenov
Nur Otan	Qojahan Jabağiev
Nur Otan	Quanyş Sūltanov
Nur Otan	Qūralai Qaraken
Nur Otan	Rahmet Mūqaşev
Nur Otan	Ramazan Sarpekov
Nur Otan	Rauan Şaekin
Assembly of People	Roman Kim
Nur Otan	Romin Madinov
Assembly of People	Rozaqūl Halmūradov
Ak Zhol	Sağiatolla Särsenov
Nur Otan	Säken Jylqaidarov
Nur Otan	Şalatai Myrzahmetov
Nur Otan	Samiğolla Urazov
Nur Otan	Särsenbai Qojahmetov
Nur Otan	Şavhat Ötemısov
Nur Otan	Seiıtsūltan Aiymbetov
Nur Otan	Sergey Dyachenko
Nur Otan	Serık Ospanov
Nur Otan	Serık Seidumanov
Nur Otan	Serık Ümbetov
Nur Otan	Serıkbai Nūrğisaev
Nur Otan	Serıkjan Qanaev
Nur Otan	Svetlana Byshkova
Nur Otan	Svetlana Ferho
Nur Otan	Svetlana Romanovskaya
Ak Zhol	Talğat Erğaliev
Nur Otan	Tatiana Yakovleva
Nur Otan	Temirhan Dosmūhambetov
Nur Otan	Tölegen İbraev
Communist People's Party	Töleş Kenjin
Nur Otan	Tūrarbek Asanov
Communist People's Party	Tūrsynbek Ömırzaqov
Nur Otan	Uälıhan Bişımbaev
Nur Otan	Ūlasbek Sädıbekov
Nur Otan	Üsengeldı Medeuov
Nur Otan	Viktor Kiyansky
Nur Otan	Viktor Rogalev
Communist People's Party	Vladislav Kosarev
Assembly of People	Yurīy Tīmoshchenko
Nur Otan	Zağipa Balieva
Assembly of People	Zuhra Sayapova
