= 4th Parliament of Kazakhstan =

Parliament of Kazakhstan legislative term

Parliament of Kazakhstan of Kazakhstan of the 4th convocation
| ← | 3rd Parliament of Kazakhstan | 5th Parliament of Kazakhstan | → |

Overview
- Legislative body: Parliament of Kazakhstan
- Meeting place: Parliament Building; Astana, Kazakhstan
- Term: 2 September 2007 – 16 November 2011
- Election: 18 August 2007

Mäjilis
- Members: 107
- Chair: Aslan Musin; Oral Muhamedjanov
- Deputy Chair: Sergey Dyachenko; Bakhytzhan Zhumagulov; Janibek Karibjanov; Vladimir Bobrov
- Party control: Nur Otan (98)

The Mäjilis of the Parliament of the Republic of Kazakhstan of the 4th convocation was the legislative term of the lower house of the Parliament of Kazakhstan. It existed from 2 September 2007 to 16 November 2011 when it was dissolved to make way for the snap legislative election which formed the 5th Mäjilis. This was the only convocation that where the ruling party Nur Otan held all the directly elected seats due to other parties not passing the 7% threshold.

The 4th Mäjilis' term started after the 2007 Kazakh legislative election where its predecessor 3rd Mäjilis was dissolved on 20 June 2007. This was the first election where all the seats where to be allocated through proportional representation, while the 9 seats are reserved to the indirectly elected members of the Assembly of People due to the 2007 amendment to the Constitution of Kazakhstan.

== Structure ==
| Office | MP | Term | Party |
|---|---|---|---|
| Chair | Aslan Musin | 2 September 2007 — 13 October 2008 | Nur Otan |
| Chair | Oral Muhamedjanov | 13 October 2008 — 16 November 2011 | Nur Otan |
| Deputy Chair | Sergey Dyachenko | 2 September 2007 — 13 March 2010 | Nur Otan |
| Deputy Chair | Bakhytzhan Zhumagulov | 2 September 2007 — 28 April 2008 | Nur Otan |
| Deputy Chair | Kabibulla Dzhakupov | 14 May 2008 — 16 November 2011 | Nur Otan |
| Deputy Chair | Vladimir Bobrov | 21 April 2010 — 16 November 2011 | Nur Otan |
| Faction leader | Bakhytzhan Zhumagulov | 2 September 2007 — 11 February 2008 | Nur Otan |
| Faction leader | Oral Muhamedjanov | 11 February 2008 — 16 November 2011 | Nur Otan |
