= Deputy Chairman of the Mäjilis =

Deputy Chairman the Mäjilis
- Status: Abolished
- Nominator: Chairman of the Mäjilis
- Appointer: Mäjilis
- Term length: None
- Inaugural holder: Vasili Osipov
- Formation: 30 January 1996
- Final holder: Albert Rau; Dania Espaeva
- Abolished: 1 July 2026
- Superseded by: Deputy chairman of the Kurultai

The Deputy Chairman of the Mäjilis of the Parliament of the Republic of Kazakhstan was a post in the Mäjilis (then-lower house of the parliament of Kazakhstan) that was chosen by the deputies and was proposed by the Chairman of the Mäjilis. The office was established on 30 January 1996 and from 2007 to 2026, the position of a deputy chairman have been occupied by two people at the same time. The deputy chair was in charge of carrying out tasks made by the Mäjilis chairman and take over certain roles if the chair wasn't able to do.

The position was abolished on 1 July 2026 following the adoption of a new constitution that abolished the bicameral parliament and established a unicameral Kurultai.

== List of Deputy Chairs ==
Sergey Dyachenko is the longest-serving Deputy Chair at 9 years and 4 months

=== 1st convocation (1996–1999) ===
Name	Took office	Left office	Time in office	Chairman
Vasili Osipov	30 January 1996	1 December 1999	3 years, 10 months	Marat Ospanov

=== 2nd convocation (1999–2004) ===
Name	Took office	Left office	Time in office	Chairman
Muhambet Kopeev	1 December 1999	30 September 2004	4 years, 9 months	Zharmakhan Tuyakbay

=== 3rd convocation (2004–2007) ===
Name	Took office	Left office	Time in office	Chairman
Sergey Dyachenko	13 November 2004	20 June 2007	2 years, 8 months	Oral Muhamedjanov

=== 4th convocation (2007–2012) ===
Name	Took office	Left office	Time in office	Chairman
Sergey Dyachenko	2 September 2007	13 March 2010	2 years, 8 months	Aslan Musin
Bakhytzhan Zhumagulov	2 September 2007	28 April 2008	10 months	Aslan Musin
Bakhytzhan Zhumagulov	2 September 2007	28 April 2008	10 months	Oral Muhamedjanov
Janibek Karibjanov	28 April 2008	15 November 2011	3 years, 6 months	Oral Muhamedjanov
Vladimir Bobrov	13 March 2010	15 November 2011	1 year, 8 months	Oral Muhamedjanov

=== 5th convocation (2012–2016) ===
Name	Took office	Left office	Time in office	Chairman
Sergey Dyachenko	20 January 2012	20 January 2016	4 years	Nurlan Nigmatulin
Baktykozha Izmukhambetov	20 January 2012	15 August 2012	6 months	Nurlan Nigmatulin
Kabibulla Dzhakupov	3 September 2012	3 April 2014	1 year, 7 months	Nurlan Nigmatulin
Dariga Nazarbayeva	3 April 2014	11 September 2015	1 year, 5 months	Kabibulla Dzhakupov
Abai Tasbolatov	11 September 2015	20 January 2016	4 months	Kabibulla Dzhakupov

=== 6th convocation (2016–2021) ===
Name	Took office	Left office	Time in office	Chairman
Vladimir Bozhko	25 March 2016	30 December 2020	4 years, 9 months	Baktykozha Izmukhambetov
Gülmira Esimbaeva	25 March 2016	30 December 2020	4 years, 9 months	Nurlan Nigmatulin

=== 7th convocation (2021–2023) ===
Name	Took office	Left office	Time in office	Chairman
Pavel Kazantsev	15 January 2021	19 January 2023	2 years	Nurlan Nigmatulin
Balaim Kesebaeva	15 January 2021	19 January 2023	2 years	Erlan Qoşanov

=== 8th convocation (2023–2026) ===
Name	Took office	Left office	Time in office	Chairman
Albert Rau	19 January 2023	1 July 2026	3 years, 5 months	Erlan Qoşanov
Dania Espaeva	19 January 2023	1 July 2026	3 years, 5 months	Erlan Qoşanov
