= 3rd Parliament of Kazakhstan =

Legislative term of the lower house of the Parliament of Kazakhstan

Parliament of Kazakhstan of Kazakhstan of the 3rd convocation
←	2nd Parliament of Kazakhstan	4th Parliament of Kazakhstan	→

Overview
- Legislative body: Parliament of Kazakhstan
- Meeting place: Parliament Building; Astana, Kazakhstan
- Term: 3 November 2004 – 20 June 2007
- Election: 19 September 2004 and 3 October 2004

Mäjilis
- Members: 77
- Chair: Oral Muhamedjanov
- Deputy Chair: Sergey Dyachenko
- Party control: Nur Otan (57)

The Mäjilis of the Parliament of the Republic of Kazakhstan of the 3rd convocation was the legislative term of the lower house of the Parliament of Kazakhstan. It lasted from 3 November 2004 until the dissolution of the Parliament on 20 June 2007. During the convocation, the Otan gained its largest share of the seats after it became merged with Asar, Civic, and Agrarian parties in 2006.

The 3rd Mäjilis was formed after the 2004 Kazakh legislative election which took place in September and October 2004. The seats were elected through mixed electoral system before the 2007 amendment to the Constitution of Kazakhstan which replaced the voting system with proportional representation.

== Structure ==
Office	MP	Term	Party
Chair	Oral Muhamedjanov	3 November 2004 — 20 June 2007	Nur Otan
Deputy Chair	Sergey Dyachenko	13 November 2004 — 20 June 2007	Nur Otan
Faction leader	Amzebek Jolshybekov	3 November 2004 — 20 June 2007	Nur Otan
