= Albert Rau =

Kazakh politician (born 1960)

MP Albert Rau
- Альберт Рау
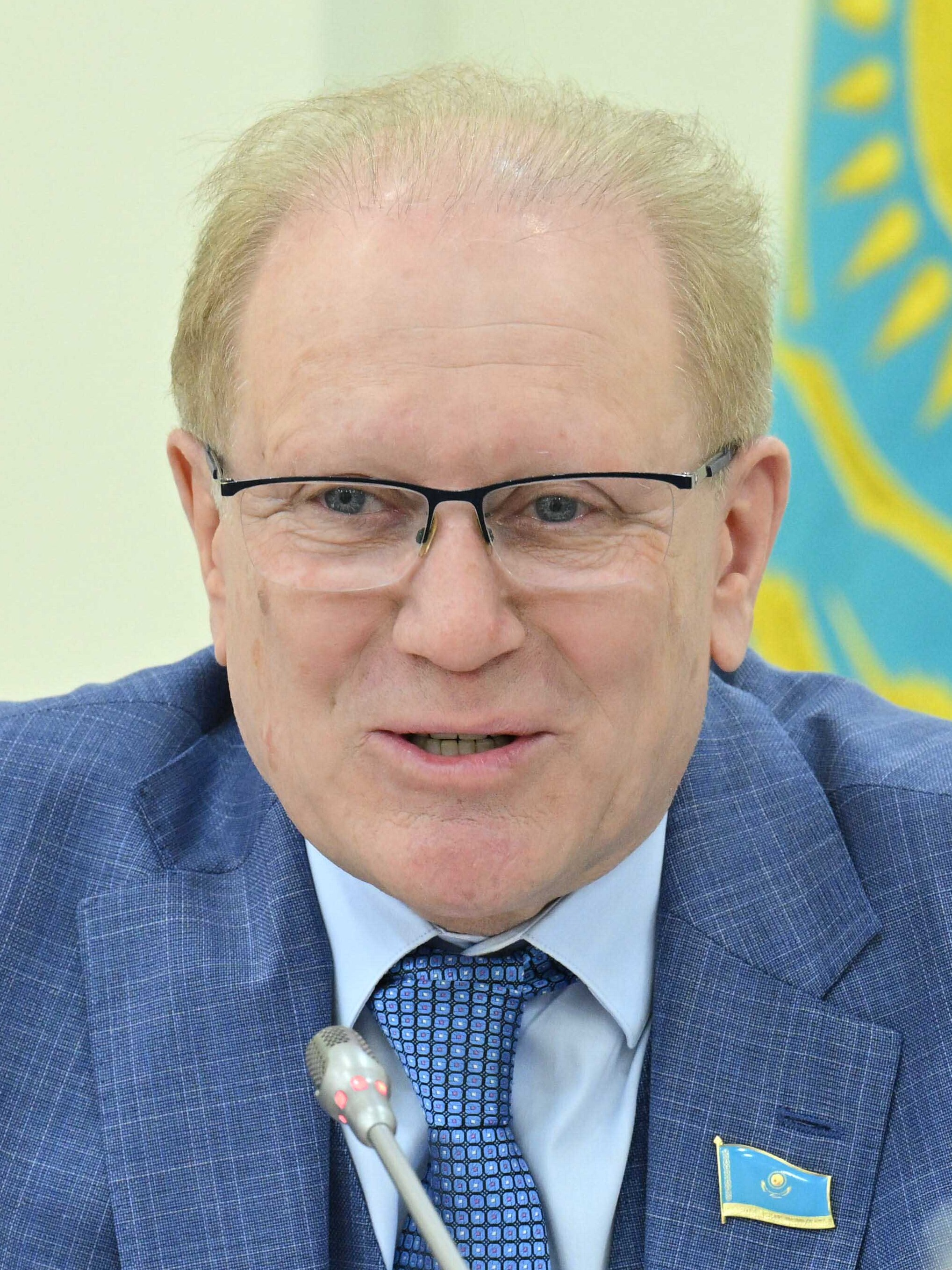
- Rau in 2024

Deputy Chairman of the Mäjilis
- In office 31 March 2023 – 1 July 2026 Serving with Dania Espaeva
- Chairman: Erlan Qoşanov
- Preceded by: Balaim Kesebaeva; Pavel Kazantsev
- Succeeded by: Office abolished

Member of the Mäjilis
- In office 13 March 2017 – 1 July 2026
- Succeeded by: Office abolished

6th Äkim of Akmola Region
- In office 2010–2014
- President: Nursultan Nazarbayev
- Preceded by: Majit Esenbaev
- Succeeded by: Sergey Dyachenko

Personal details
- Born: 1 September 1960 (age 66) Valeryanovka, Taran District, Kostanay Region, Kazakh SSR, Soviet Union
- Party: Amanat (since 2022)
- Spouse: Svetlana Vasilyevna Rau
- Children: 2
- Education: Rudny Industrial Institute (1982); Russian Academy of State Service (2004)
- Occupation: mining engineer (1982); economist-manager (2004)

Military service
- Allegiance: Soviet Union
- Branch/service: Soviet Army
- Years of service: 1982–1984
- Rank: cadet

Albert Pavlovich Rau (Russian: Альберт Павлович Рау, [ɐlʲˈbʲert ˈpavɫəvʲɪtɕ ˈraʊ]; German: Albert Pawlowitsch Rau; born 1 September 1960) is a Kazakh politician and economist, who served, alongside Dania Espaeva, as the last Deputy Chairman and Member of the Mäjilis, lower house of Kazakhstan's former legislature.

Before his parliamentary career, Rau held several positions in both local and republican government, including Deputy Minister of Investments and Development (2014–2017), First Deputy Minister of Industry and New technologies (2010–2014), Äkim of Akmola Region (2008–2010) and of Lisakovsk City Äkim (1994–2004).

On 1 July 2026, the Mäjilis was abolished following the 2026 Kazakh constitutional referendum that set the 2026 Constitution of Kazakhstan in place, creating the unicameral Kurultai.

== Early life and education ==
Rau was born on 1 September 1960, in the Valeyanovka village, Kostanay Region to a Protestant family. Born an ethnic German, Rau is the grandnephew of a famous Volga German archaeologist Paul Rau.

Albert Rau ended his studies as a mining engineer in the Rudny Industrial Institute in 1982. In 2004, he finished studying in the Russian Academy of State Service and became a manager-economist.

Rau started his career in 1981 as the Chairman of the Trade Union Committee of the Rudny Industrial Institute.

From 1982 to 1984, Rau served in the Soviet Army. From 1984 to 1991, he was an electrician of the production site, chairman of the trade union committee of the Kurzhunkulsky mine of the Sokolov-Sarbai Mining Production Association.

== Political career ==
=== Regional politics ===
Rau started his political career around the time of the dissolution of the Soviet Union, in the year 1991, as Deputy Head for Production of the executive committee of the Lisakovsk City Council of People's Deputies (now Lisakovsk City Mäslihat).

From 1992 to 1993, he was the first chairman of the Lisakovsk City Council of People's Deputies. From 1993 to 1994, he was deputy chairman, and then Chairman of the Lisakovo Free Economic Zone.

In 1994, he was appointed as the Head of the Lisakovsk City Administration, in 1995, the position was renamed Äkim of Lisakovsk. Rau served as the city head until 2004.

In the years 2004–2007, Rau served as the Deputy Äkim of Kostanay Region and in 2008, he was appointed as the 6th Äkim of Akmola Region.

=== Career in the Government ===
In 2010, he ended his äkimship to be appointed as First Vice Minister of Industry and New Technologies of Kazakhstan. As reported by the President Nursultan Nazarbayev and Rau himself, Rau's appointment in the Government of Kazakhstan as Deputy Minister was made to have him serve as the de facto Minister of Industry and New Technologies; the reasoning being that Minister Asset Issekeshev, who was also Deputy Prime Minister, wouldn't have enough time to lead the Ministry.

He served here until 2014, when he became Vice Minister, and later First Vice Minister for Investments and Development of the country until 2017.

=== Parliamentary career ===
From March 2017, Rau was serving in the 6th, 7th and 8th convocations of the Mäjilis consecutively in the Amanat political faction. On 31 March 2023, Rau was appointed as Deputy Chairman of the Mäjilis. On 1 July 2026, the Mäjilis was abolished, becoming replaced by the Kurultai of Kazakhstan.

== Personal life ==
Rau is an ethnic German and speaks German and Russian. He is married to Svetlana Vasilyevna Rau, an ethnic Russian. Rau has two children; a daughter Alexandra (born 1985) and a son Aleksey (born 1986).

Rau's son Aleksey is an entrepreneur, an alumnus of the SBS Swiss Business School, and the creator of the Astana School of Management and Business. Albert Rau's daughter Alexandra is married, and currently lives outside the country.

== Awards, decorations and titles ==
Rau's awards and decorations include:

- Order of the Leopard, 3rd class
- Order of Friendship
- Order of Parasat
- Medal "For Contribution to the Creation of the Eurasian Economic Union", 1st class
- Grand Cross of the Order of Merit of the Federal Republic of Germany
- Medal "For 10 years of Kazakhstan's independence"
- "Miner's Glory" (Kazakh: Кенші даңқы), 2nd class
- Certificate by the Commonwealth of Independent States

Rau's honorary titles include:

- Honorary professor of the Kokshetau State University
- Honorary professor of the Rudny Industrial Institute
- Academic of the Kazakhstan National Academy of Natural Sciences (2011)
