= 23rd Assembly of People of Kazakhstan Session =

2016 meeting of political body

The 23rd Extraordinary Assembly of People of Kazakhstan Session was held on 21 March 2016 at the Palace of Peace and Reconciliation in Astana following the 2016 legislative elections. From there, 372 of 446 Assembly of People of Kazakhstan (QHA) members took part in voting for its nine nominees to the Mazhilis of which the seats were reserved to. As a result, nine new members were elected, namely Sauytbek Adrahmanov, Vladimir Bozhko, Natalya Zhumadildaeva, Roman Kim, Narine Mikaelyan, Akhmed Muradov, Shaimardan Nurumov, Yurīy Tīmoshchenko, and Shakir Khakhazov.

The newly elected QHA members took office on 25 March 2016 at the start of the 6th Parliament of Kazakhstan.

== Background ==
=== Assembly of People of Kazakhstan ===
The Assembly of People of Kazakhstan (QHA) is a consultative and advisory body under the President of Kazakhstan; the task of the body is to promote the development and implementation of state national policy. Formed in 1995, it was originally made to consolidate the interests of all ethnic groups living in Kazakhstan, ensuring the strict observance of rights and freedoms, regardless of their national origin.

In May 2007, a number of amendments were made to the Constitution of Kazakhstan to which the Assembly was given a constitutional status where it received the right to elect nine members to the Mazhilis, which significantly increased the social and political role of the QHA. In October 2008, following the adoption of the Law "On the Assembly of the People of Kazakhstan", the QHA became a full-fledged subject of the country's political system, and the normative legal framework for its activities was determined.

=== 2016 legislative elections ===
On 20 January 2016, President Nursultan Nazarbayev signed decree on dissolution of the 5th Mazhilis which was elected in January 2012 and setting a new date for snap elections to be held on 20 March for Mazhilis MP's and for the Assembly of People of Kazakhstan (QHA) elections for 21 March 2016.

==== Candidates ====
On 29 February 2016, in accordance with the requirements of the electoral law, the candidates for the Mazhilis by the QHA were nominated and then registered by the Central Election Commission (OSK) on 2 March 2016. The list of QHA candidates included seven men, two women with all them having higher education. Among the candidates there are three certified engineers, 1 doctor, 1 lawyer, 1 teacher, and three more - other specialties.

- Sauytbek Adrahmanov, chairman of the board of JSC Yegemen Qazaqstan, member of the QHA
- Vladimir Bozhko, former Internal Affairs Minister, deputy chairman of the Association of Russian, Slavic and Cossack Organizations PA, member of the QHA
- Natalya Zhumadildaeva, director of the House of Pupils and Youths of Kyzylorda, member of the QHA
- Roman Kim, chairman of the NGO Association of Koreans of Kazakhstan, member of the QHA, member of the 5th Mazhilis
- Narine Mikaelyan, chairman of the Luys Armenian Cultural Center in Almaty, member of the QHA
- Akhmed Muradov, co-chairman of the NGO Vainakh Association for the Development of Culture of the Chechen and Ingush Peoples, member of the QHA Council, member of the 5th Mazhilis
- Shaimardan Nurumov, chairman of the Public Association Republican Cultural Center of the Uighurs of Kazakhstan, a member of the QHA Council.
- Yurīy Tīmoshchenko, chairman of the ALE Rada of Ukrainians of Kazakhstan, member of the QHA, member of the 5th Mazhilis
- Shakir Khakhazov, board member of the Association of Dungan Ethnocultural Centers, a member of the QHA Council

== Results ==
Candidate	Votes	Percentage	Result
Vladimir Bozhko	349	93.82	✓ Elected
Roman Kim	346	93.01	✓ Elected
Sauytbek Adrahmanov	345	92.74	✓ Elected
Natalya Zhumadildaeva	343	92.20	✓ Elected
Shakir Khakhazov	342	91.94	✓ Elected
Yurīy Tīmoshchenko	341	91.67	✓ Elected
Akhmed Muradov	339	91.13	✓ Elected
Shaimardan Nurumov	337	90.59	✓ Elected
Narine Mikaelyan	336	90.32	✓ Elected
Invalid votes	3	0.81	
Total valid	372	100.00	9 elected
Number of delegates/turnout	446	83.41	9 elected
Source: OSK Tengrinews.kz
