= Balaim Kesebaeva =

Kazakh politician and jurist (born 1966)

Balaiym Kesebaeva
- Балайым Кесебаева
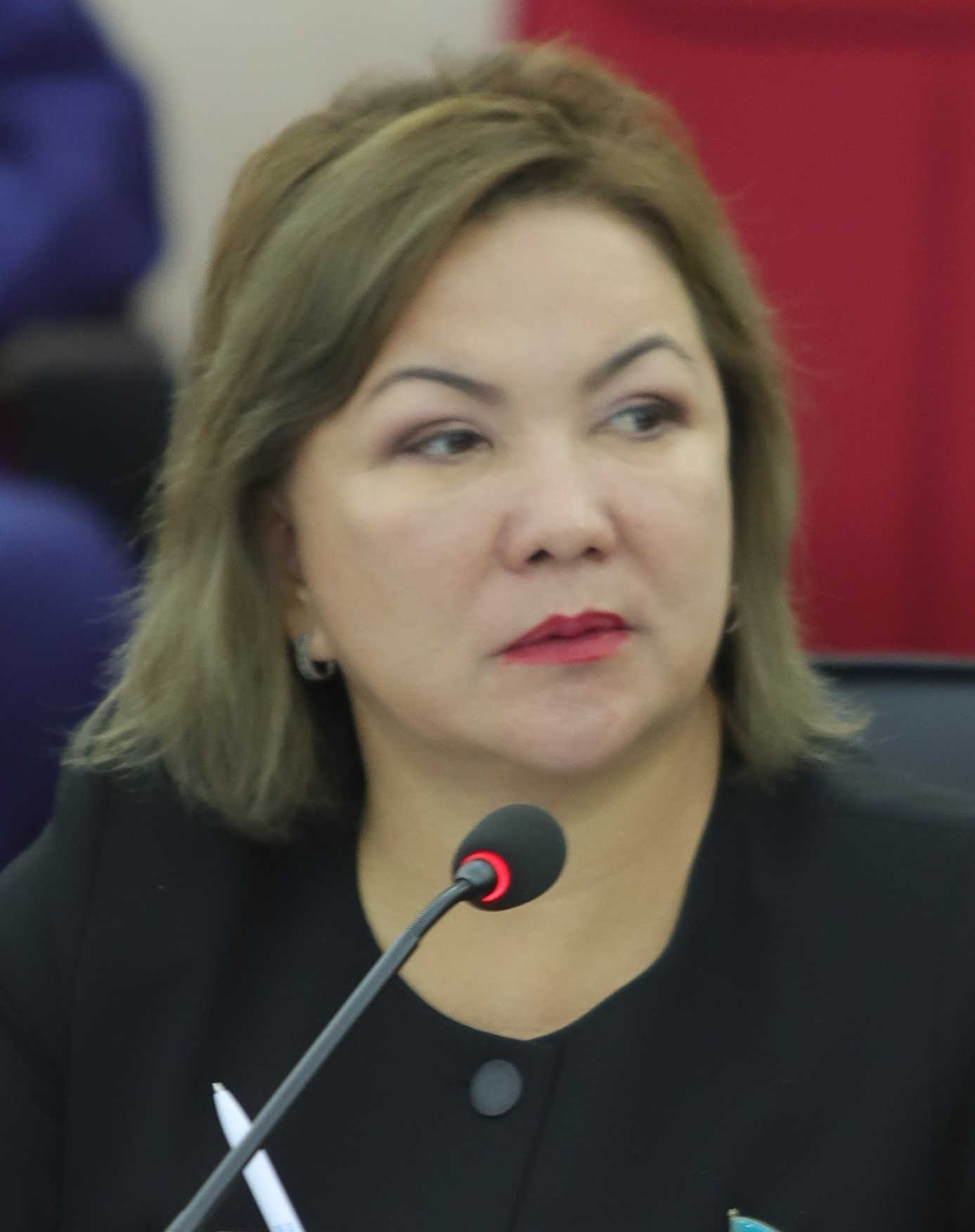
- Kesebaeva in 2019

Deputy Chairwoman of the Mäjilis
- In office 15 January 2021 – 19 January 2023 Serving with Pavel Kazantsev
- Chairman: Nurlan Nigmatulin
- Preceded by: Gülmira Esimbaeva
- Succeeded by: Albert Rau; Dania Espaeva

Member of the Mäjilis
- In office 20 March 2016 – 19 January 2023

Personal details
- Born: 23 April 1966 (age 60) Jambyl, Kazakh SSR, Soviet Union
- Party: Nur Otan (2012–present)
- Education: Taldykorgan Law College; Al-Farabi Kazakh National University; Korkyt Ata Kyzylorda University

Balaiym Tuğanbaiqyzy Kesebaeva (Kazakh: Балайым Туғанбайқызы Кесебаева, [bɑɫɑjɯm to̙wɣɑnˈbɑjˈqɯzɯ kʲesʲebɑjɯʋɑ]; born 23 April 1966) is a Kazakh politician and jurist who's serving as the Head of the Department of Justice of the city of Almaty. Previously, Kesebaeva was the Deputy Chair of the Mäjilis from 2021 to 2023 and a member of the Mäjilis from March 2016 to 2023.

== Biography ==
=== Early life and career ===
Kesebaeva was born in the village of Jambyl in Turkistan Region. She received her education from Taldykorgan Law College, Al-Farabi Kazakh National University, and Korkyt Ata Kyzylorda University where she earned her bachelor's degree.

From 1985 to 1988, she worked as the head of the Office of the Department of Justice of the Chimkent Regional Executive Committee. In 1993, Kesebaeva was appointed as a clerk of the Shaha Architectural and Design Cooperative in Almaty and then from 1994 to 1998, she served as a counselor, chief counselor, chief specialist, and head of Department of the Ministry of Justice. In 1999, she became the deputy head in Kyzylorda Regional Department of Justice then in 2002 as the Head of the Mangystau Regional Department of Justice. From 2004, Kesebaeva worked as director of the Department of Internal Administration of the Ministry of Justice until becoming the Kyzylorda Regional Department of Justice head again in 2009.

=== Political career ===
In 2016, Kesebaeva was candidate for the Nur Otan party in the legislative elections and became a Mäjilis member following the results on 24 March 2016. From there, she served as member of the Committee on Legislation and Judicial and Legal Reform. She ran for reelection in 2021 after winning the party's primaries where she was at the following opening session of the 7th Mäjilis on 15 January 2021 elected as the Deputy Chair of the Mäjilis. Her term as member ended in January 2023, and she did not run for reelection.

On 22 May 2023, she was appointed Head of the Department of Justice of Almaty.
