= Marat Ospanov =

Kazakh politician (1949–2000)

- Марат Оспанов
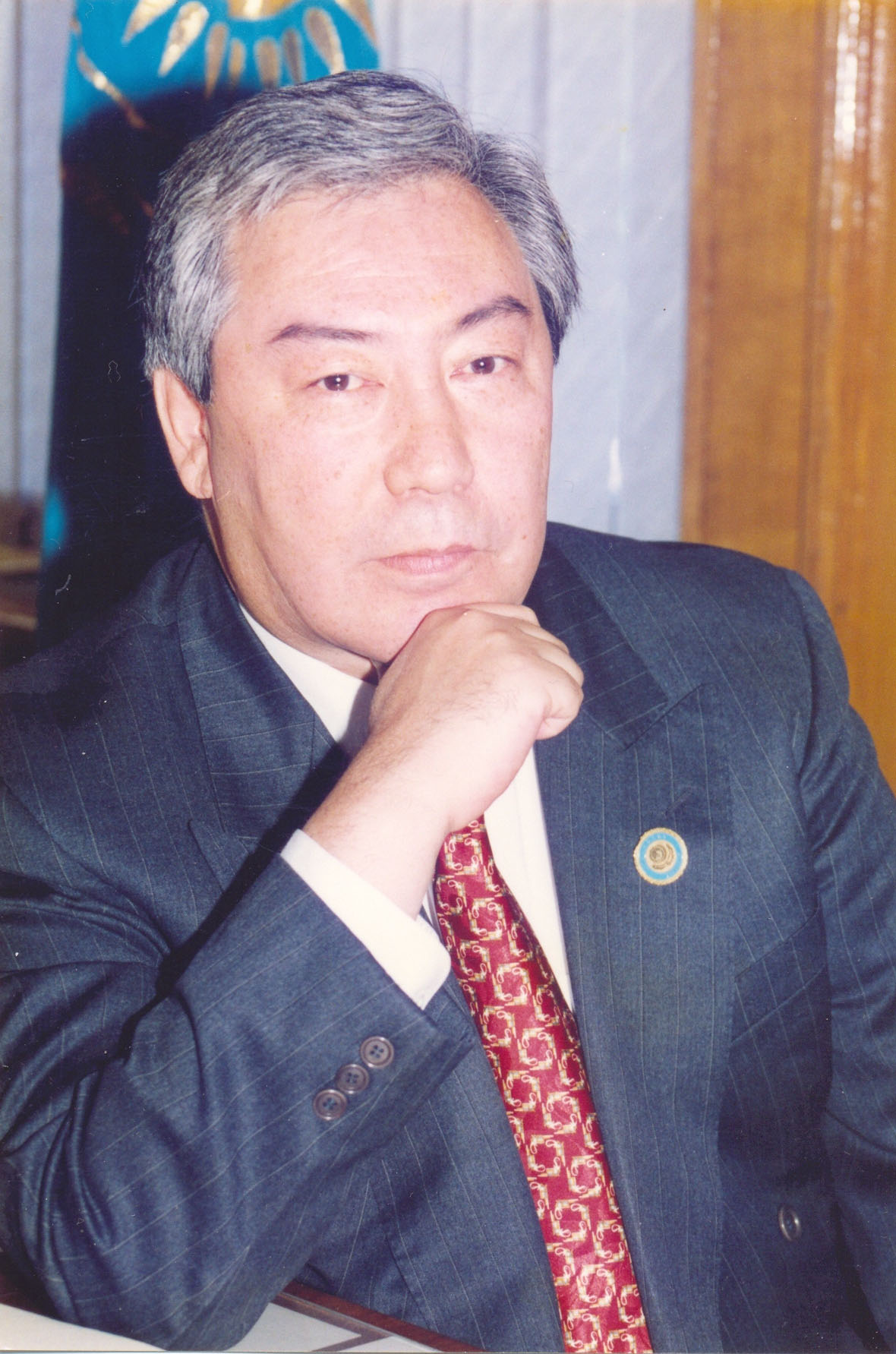

1st Chairman of the Mäjilis
- In office 30 January 1996 – 1 December 1999
- Deputy: Vasily Osipov
- Preceded by: Office established
- Succeeded by: Zharmakhan Tuyakbay

Leader of Otan in the Mäjilis
- In office 12 February 1999 – 1 December 1999
- Leader: Bakhytzhan Zhumagulov
- Preceded by: Position established
- Succeeded by: Zharmakhan Tuyakbay

Member of the Mäjilis
- In office 9 December 1995 – 23 January 2000

Deputy Chairman of Otan
- In office May 1999 – 23 January 2000
- Leader: Bakhytzhan Zhumagulov

Deputy Minister of Finance
- In office November 1992 – March 1994
- President: Nursultan Nazarbayev
- Prime Minister: Sergey Tereshchenko

Deputy Chairman of the Supreme Council
- In office April 1994 – March 1995

Member of the Supreme Council
- In office 4 March 1990 – 13 December 1993

Personal details
- Born: 17 September 1949 Aktyubinsk, Aktyubinsk Oblast, Kazakh SSR, Soviet Union
- Died: 23 January 2000 (aged 50) Almaty, Kazakhstan
- Party: Otan

Marat Tūrdybekūly Ospanov (Note: Kazakh: Марат Тұрдыбекұлы Оспанов, IPA: [mɑrɑ́t tʰʊrd̥əb̥ʲékʰʊɫə́ wospʰɑ́nəf]) (Note: Often transliterated as Marat Turdybekovich Ospanov through a Russified Romanization of Марат Турдыбекович Оспанов.) (17 September 1949 – 23 January 2000) was a Kazakh politician. He was the 1st Chairman of the Mäjilis from 1996 to 1999, a member of the Supreme Council from 1990 to 1993, the Deputy Chairman of the Supreme Council from 1994 to 1995, and a Deputy Minister of Finance from 1992 to 1994.

He was an author of an economic program "From Stabilization to Us". He took part in the development of the first Tax Code of Kazakhstan, and in the Declaration of Independence of Kazakhstan. Ospanov was awarded the Order "Barys" II degree. He died on 23 January 2000 in Almaty.
