= Amzebek Jolshybekov =

Kazakh politician (born 1947)

Ämzebek Jolşybekov
- Әмзебек Жолшыбеков
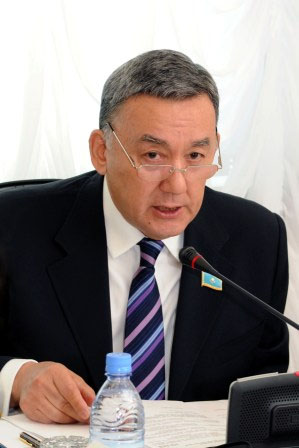
- Jolşybekov in 2010

Leader of Nur Otan in the Mäjilis
- In office April 2005 – 20 June 2007
- Leader: Nursultan Nazarbayev
- Preceded by: Amangeldi Taspihov
- Succeeded by: Bakhytzhan Zhumagulov

Member of the Mäjilis
- In office October 1999 – 20 January 2012
- Constituency: 31st district (1999)

Personal details
- Born: 7 March 1947 (age 79) Tamdy, Kazakh SSR, Soviet Union
- Party: Nur Otan
- Other political affiliations: Otan (1999−2006)

Ämzebek Rysbekūly Jolşybekov (Kazakh: Әмзебек Рысбекұлы Жолшыбеков; born 7 March 1947) is a Kazakh politician. He was a member of the Mäjilis from 1999 to 2012, parliamentary leader of Otan from 2004 to 2006, and then Nur Otan from 2006 to 2007, Deputy Chairman of the CEC from 1991 to 1993, and the Secretary of the National Council from 2002 to 2003.

== Biography ==
Jolşybekov was born in 1947 in the village of Tamdy in the Jambyl Region of Kazakh SSR.

In 1970, he graduated from the Jambyl Technological Institute of Light and Food Industries. Jolşybekov was promoted to head of the workshop and the Deputy Director of the Berlik Bread Production Enterprise, where he stayed until 1973. That year, he became the First Secretary of the Chui District Komsomol Committee. Beginning in 1978, Jolşybekov worked in various government bodies in the Jambyl region. In 1989, he finished the Alma-Ata Higher Party School. After graduating, Jolşybekov was the Deputy Head of the Department of the Central Committee of the Communist Party of Kazakhstan until 1990, when he became the Secretary of the Jambyl Regional Committee of the Communist Party of Kazakhstan.

From 1991 to 1993, Jolşybekov was the President of Tulpar Joint Stock Company in Jambyl. From 1993 to 1995, he was the head of three districts in the Jambyl Region. In 1995, he became the State Inspector of the Administration of the President. From 1996 to 1997, Jolşybekov was the Deputy Chief of Staff of the Mäjilis.

From 1997 to 1998, he was the Head Secretary of the Supreme Disciplinary Council of Kazakhstan. In September 1998, Jolşybekov became the Deputy Head of the Organization and Control Department of the Presidential Administration of the Republic of Kazakhstan.

In October 1999, Jolşybekov was elected as member of the Mäjilis in the 1999 legislative election, representing the 31st district of the Jambyl Region. In November 2002, he was chosen to be the Head of the Office of the Senate of Kazakhstan. In March 2004, he became the Head of the Department of the Presidential Administration until November of that year. On 19 September 2004, Jolşybekov became the parliamentary leader of the Otan faction in the Mäjilis. He was reelected in 2004 and remained a member and the parliamentary leader until 20 June 2007. Jolşybekov was reelected for a third term in 2007, and served until his retirement in 2012. From 2008 to 2009, Jolşybekov was the President of Mining and Metallurgical Concern Kazakhaltyn JSC.
