= List of Äkims of Akmola Region =

This is the list of äkims of Aqmola Region that have held the position since 1992.

== List ==
- Andrey Braun (12 February 1992 – 3 July 1997)
- Jänıbek Kärıbjanov (3 July 1997 – 18 December 1997)
- Vladimir Gartman (19 December 1997 – 14 September 1998)
- Sergey Kulagin (16 September 1998 – 20 March 2004)
- Mäjit Esenbaev (20 March 2004 – 23 January 2008)
- Albert Rau (23 January 2008 – 13 March 2010)
- Sergey Dyachenko (13 March 2010 – 20 January 2012)
- Qairat Qojamjarov (21 January 2012 – 21 January 2013)
- Kosman Aitmūhametov (22 January 2013 – 27 May 2014)
- Sergey Kulagin (27 May 2014 – 14 March 2017)
- Mälık Myrzalin (14 March 2017 – 19 March 2019)
- Ermek Marjyqpaev (19 March 2019 – 2 September 2023)
- Marat Ahmetjanov (5 September 2023 –present)

== See also ==
- Akim
- Akmola Region
