= Chairman of the Mäjilis =

Former speaker of the lower house of Kazakhstans parliament

Chairman of the Mäjilis of Kazakhstan
- Қазақстан Мәжілісінің төрағасы (Kazakh); председатель Мажилиса Казахстана (Russian)

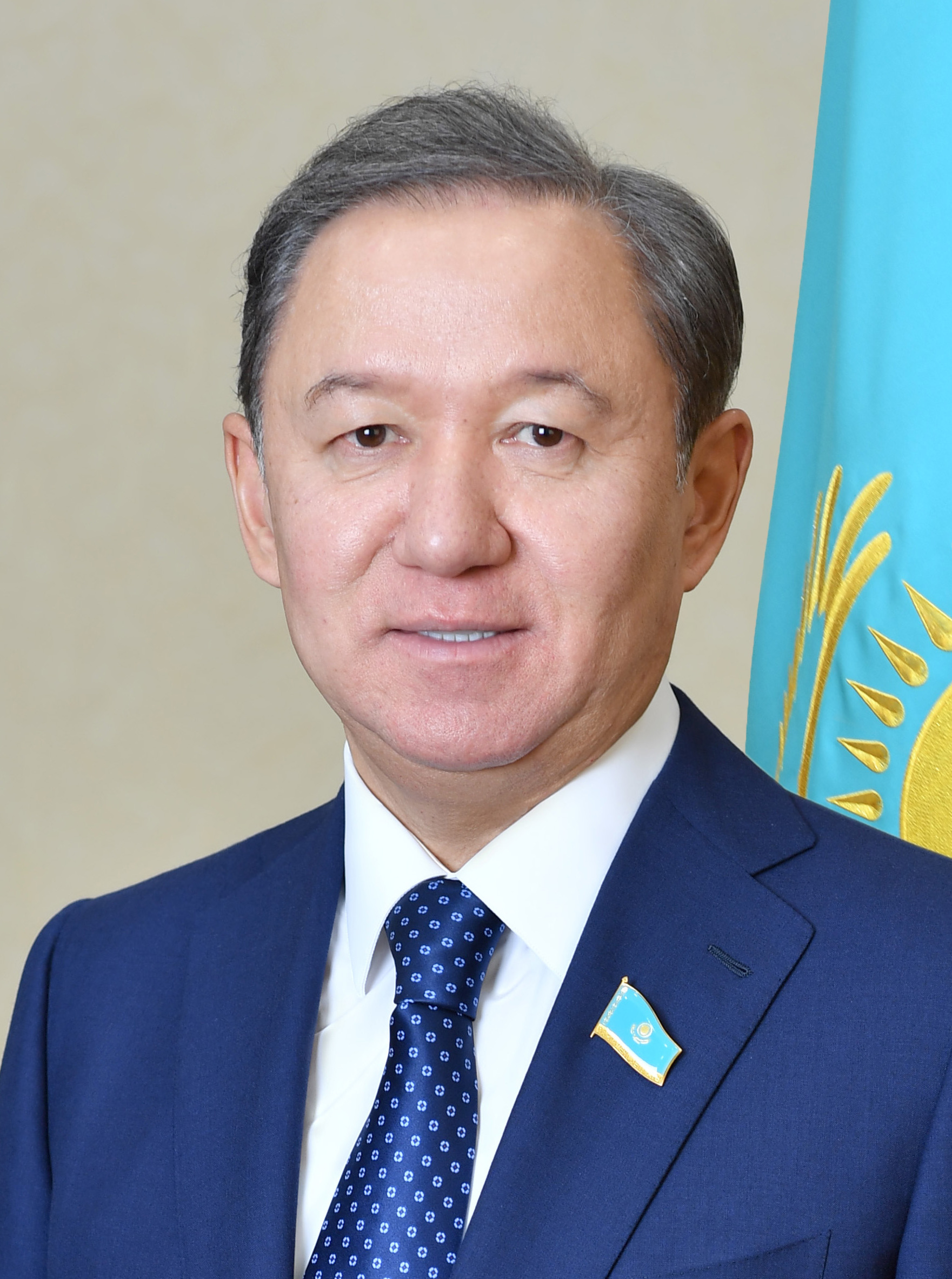
- Longest serving Nurlan Nigmatulin; 20 January 2012 – 3 April 2014; 22 June 2016 – 1 February 2022
- Status: Abolished
- Appointer: Mäjilis
- Term length: None
- Precursor: Chairmen of the Supreme Soviet of Kazakhstan
- Formation: 30 January 1996
- First holder: Marat Ospanov
- Final holder: Erlan Qoşanov
- Abolished: 1 July 2026
- Superseded by: Chairman of the Kurultai
- Website: Official website of the Mäjilis

The Chairman of the Mäjilis of the Parliament of the Republic of Kazakhstan (Note: Kazakh: Қазақстан Республикасы Парламенті Мәжілісінің Төрағасы, romanized: Qazaqstan Respublikasy Parlamentı Mäjılısınıñ Törağasy; Russian: Председатель Мажилиса Парламента Республики Казахстан, romanized: Predsedatel' Mazhilisa Parlamenta Respubliki Kazakhstan) was a presiding officer of the lower house Mäjilis of the Parliament of Kazakhstan, and was responsible for opening sessions, preside over regular and extraordinary joint meetings. The post was formed on 30 January 1996 at the first parliamentary session opening after the 1995 constitutional referendum which was held in August 1995 where majority of Kazakh voters approved of the new constitution which created a bicameral legislature that included the lower chamber Mäjilis. The post was abolished on 1 July 2026 following the adoption of a new Constitution that transitioned the country to a unicameral parliament, the Kurultai.

== Election and term ==
The chairman of the Mäjilis was elected by a majority vote of the total number of members of the Mäjilis from among its deputies through a secret ballot. Candidates are nominated by members and are permitted to address the chamber and respond to questions prior to the vote. If no candidate receives a majority, a runoff is held between the two candidates who received the most votes.

The chairman could be recalled by a majority vote of the members or resign voluntarily.

The office did not have a constitutionally fixed term, but the chairman typically served for the duration of the Mäjilis convocation.

== Powers and responsibilities ==
The chairman held both procedural and administrative authority over the Mäjilis. Responsibilities included:

- convening and presiding over plenary sessions of the Mäjilis, including regular and extraordinary sessions;
- convening and presiding over joint sessions of Parliament;
- submitting the legislative agenda and order of work to the plenary session for approval;
- managing the preparation of matters submitted for consideration by the chamber;
- submitting candidates for deputy chairmen of the Mäjilis, judges of the Constitutional Court, members of the Central Electoral Commission, and the Supreme Audit Chamber;
- ensuring compliance with parliamentary rules and overseeing the work of the Bureau;
- signing acts issued by the chamber and issuing orders on matters within the chairman's competence;
- performing other duties assigned by the regulations of the Parliament or the Mäjilis.

In cases of temporary absence, duties could be performed by one of the deputy chairmen of the Mäjilis.

== List of chairmen ==
No.	Portrait	Name	Took office	Left office	Tenure	Political Party
1		Marat Ospanov (1949–2000)	30 January 1996	1 December 1999	3 years, 10 months	Independent
1		Marat Ospanov (1949–2000)	30 January 1996	1 December 1999	3 years, 10 months	Otan
2		Zharmakhan Tuyakbay (born 1947)	1 December 1999	3 November 2004	4 years, 11 months	Otan
3		Oral Muhamedjanov (1947–2013)	3 November 2004	20 June 2007	2 years, 7 months	Otan
3		Oral Muhamedjanov (1947–2013)	3 November 2004	20 June 2007	2 years, 7 months	Nur Otan
4		Aslan Musin (born 1955)	2 September 2007	13 October 2008	1 year, 1 month	Nur Otan
5		Oral Muhamedjanov (1947–2013)	13 October 2008	16 November 2011	3 years, 1 month	Nur Otan
6		Nurlan Nigmatulin (born 1961)	20 January 2012	3 April 2014	2 years, 2 months	Nur Otan
7		Kabibulla Dzhakupov (born 1949)	3 April 2014	20 January 2016	1 year, 9 months	Nur Otan
8		Baktykozha Izmukhambetov (born 1947)	25 March 2016	22 June 2016	2 months	Nur Otan
9		Nurlan Nigmatulin (born 1961)	22 June 2016	1 February 2022	5 years, 7 months	Nur Otan
10		Erlan Qoşanov (born 1963)	1 February 2022	1 July 2026	4 years, 5 months	Amanat

== See also ==
- Chairman of the Kurultai, superseding office
- Chairman of the Senate of Kazakhstan, parallel office of the higher house
- Mäjilis, the presided body
