= Qoshalaq =

- Location in Kazakhstan
- Coordinates: 47°21′13″N 49°01′19″E
- Country: Kazakhstan
- Region: Atyrau Region
- District: Kurmangazy District

Population
  - Total: 329
- Time zone: UTC+5 (West Kazakhstan Time)
  - Summer (DST): UTC+5 (West Kazakhstan Time)

Qoshalaq (Kazakh: Қошалақ, Qoşalaq) is a village in Kurmangazy District, Atyrau Region, Kazakhstan.

== Notable people ==
- Baktykozha Izmukhambetov, Kazakh politician, chairman of the Mazhilis from March to June 2016.
