= Baktykozha Izmukhambetov =

Kazakh politician (born 1947)

Baqtyqozha Izmukhambetov
- Бақтықожа Ізмұхамбетов
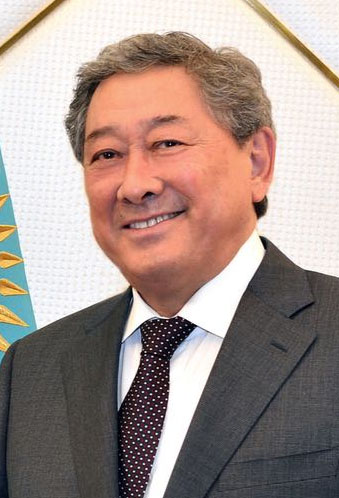
- Izmukhambetov in 2016

8th Chairman of the Mäzhilis
- In office 25 March 2016 – 21 June 2016
- Deputy: Vladimir Bozhko; Gülmira Isimbaeva
- Preceded by: Qabibolla Zhaqypov
- Succeeded by: Nurlan Nyghmatulin

Deputy Chairman of the Mäzhilis
- In office 20 January 2012 – 15 August 2012
- Chair: Oral Mukhamedzhanov; Nurlan Nyghmatulin
- Preceded by: Zhänibek Käribzhanov
- Succeeded by: Qabibolla Zhaqypov

Member of the Mäzhilis
- In office 28 March 2023 – 1 July 2026
- In office 20 March 2016 – 21 June 2016
- In office 15 January 2012 – 15 August 2012

Äkim of Atyrau Region
- In office 15 August 2012 – 24 March 2016
- Preceded by: Bergei Rysqaliev
- Succeeded by: Nurlan Noghaev

Äkim of West Kazakhstan Region
- In office 28 August 2007 – 18 January 2012
- Preceded by: Nurghali Äshim
- Succeeded by: Nurlan Noghaev

Minister of Energy and Mineral Resources
- In office 19 January 2006 – 28 August 2007
- President: Nursultan Nazarbaev
- Prime Minister: Danial Akhmetov; Kärim Mäsimov
- Preceded by: Vladimir Shkolnik
- Succeeded by: Sauat Myngbaev

Personal details
- Born: 1 September 1947 (age 78) Qoshalaq, Atyrau Oblast, Kazakh SSR, Soviet Union
- Party: Amanat
- Spouse: Rys Turganina
- Children: 2
- Education: Ufa State Petroleum Technological University

Baqtyqozha Salahatdinuly Izmukhambetov (Note: Often transliterated as Baktykozha Salakhatdinovich Izmukhambetov through a Russified Romanization of Бактыкожа Салахатдинович Измухамбетов.) (Kazakh: Бақтықожа Салахатдинұлы Ізмұхамбетов, romanized: Baqtyqoja Salahatdinūly Izmūhambetov; born 1 September 1947) is a Kazakh politician who is currently serving as a Member of the Mäzhilis since March 2023 from the Amanat party.

Izmukhambetov used to serve as the Chairman of the Mäzhilis from March to June 2016, äkim of Atyrau Region from 2012 to 2016, äkim of West Kazakhstan Region from 2007 to 2012, and a Minister of Energy and Mineral Resources from 2006 to 2007.

== Career ==
From 1965 to 1971, Izmukhambetov studied at the Ufa State Petroleum Technological University in Bashkir Autonomous Soviet Socialist Republic of the Russian Soviet Federative Socialist Republic. After graduating, he started as a driller with Embaneft association and later occupied a number of positions in Kazakh Exploration R&D Institute. From 1982 to 1987, Izmukhambetov was in mission in Yemen.

Between 1991 and 1993, Izmukhambetov held different posts at the Ministry of Geology and Subsurface Protection. After that, he served as the director-general of Kazakhturkmunay and Kazmunaytengiz oil companies, and as a managing director of the national oil company KazMunayGas. Later, he served as the first vice minister of Energy and Mineral Resources, and from 19 January 2006 until 28 August 2007 as a minister of Energy and Mineral Resources.

He served as Äkim of the West Kazakhstan Region from 28 August 2007 to January 2012 and as Minister of Energy and Mineral Resources of Kazakhstan from 2006 to 2007.

During the 2012 legislative election, Izmukhambetov was elected to the Mäzhilis, he was subsequently appointed as the Deputy Chairman. From 2012 to 2016 he served as Äkim of the Atyrau Region, he succeeded Bergei Rysqaliev in this position. He was himself succeeded by Nurlan Noghaev on 26 March 2016. On 25 March 2016, Izmukhambetov was sworn in as the Chairman of the Mäzhilis and succeeded Qabibolla Zhaqypov. On 21 June 2016, Izmukhambetov resigned as the Mäzhilis Chairman to become chairman of the Republican Public Association of Veterans Organization of the Central Council. He was succeeded as chair by Nurlan Nyghmatulin.

Izmukhambetov is decorated with the Order of Qurmet (1999) and with the third class of the Order of Merit of Ukraine (2008).
