= Abai Tasbolatov =

Kazakh politician and lieutenant general

- Абай Тасболатов
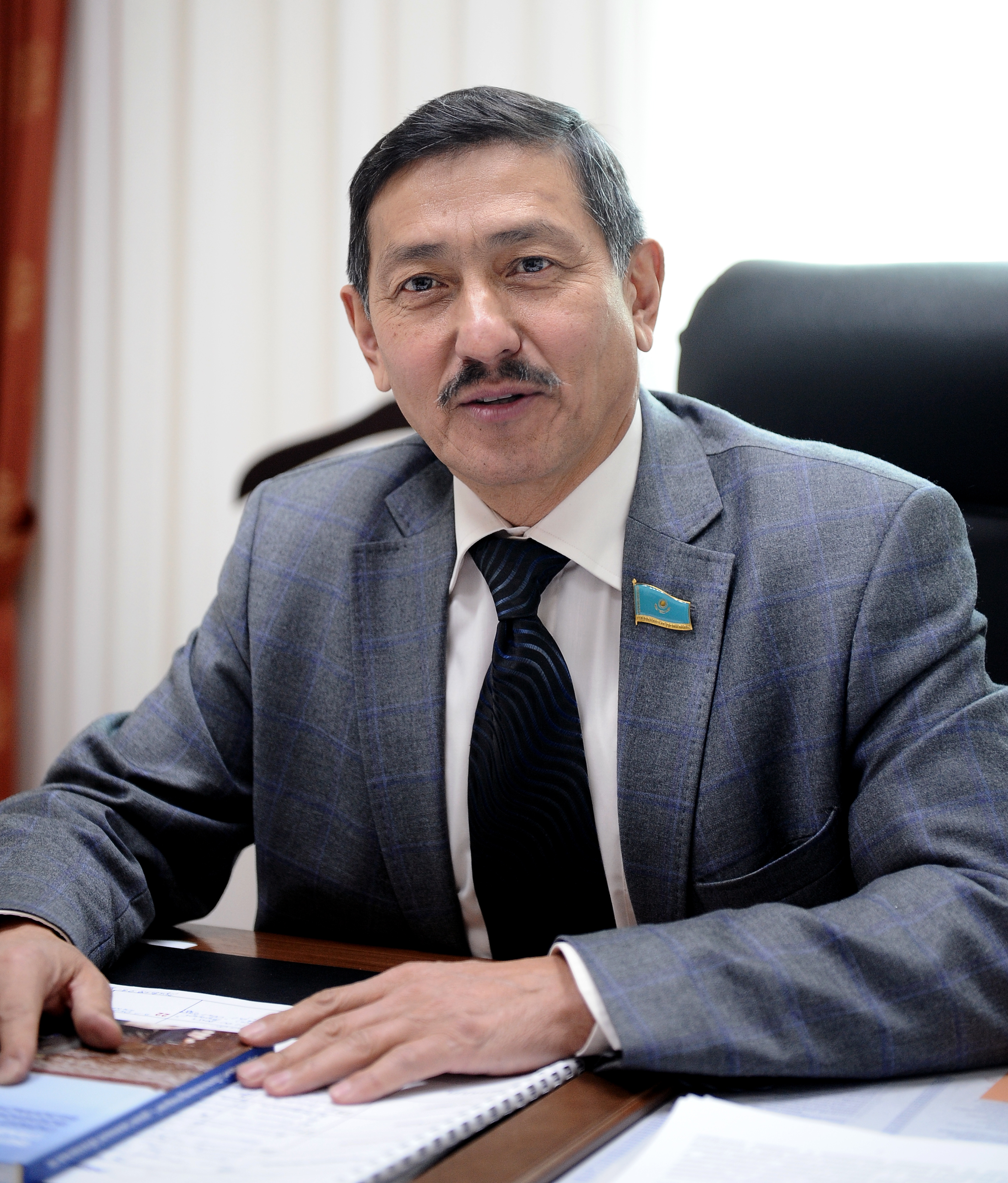
- Tasbolatov in 2013

Commander of the Republican Guard
- In office 23 January 2006 – 23 November 2011
- President: Nursultan Nazarbayev
- Preceded by: Bulat Iskakov
- Succeeded by: Amangeldy Shabdarbayev

Deputy Chair of the Mäjilis
- In office 11 September 2015 – 20 January 2016
- Chair: Kabibulla Dzhakupov
- Preceded by: Dariga Nazarbayeva
- Succeeded by: Vladimir Bozhko

Member of the Mäjilis
- Incumbent
- Assumed office 15 January 2012

Personal details
- Born: 21 September 1951 (age 75) Nikolaevka, Kazakh SSR, Soviet Union
- Party: Nur Otan
- Children: 2
- Education: Military Institute of the Kazakh Ground Forces; Frunze Military Academy; Military Academy of the General Staff of the Armed Forces of Russia; Lee Kuan Yew School of Public Policy

Military service
- Allegiance: Soviet Union (1973–1991); Kazakhstan (since 1991)
- Branch/service: Armed Forces of Kazakhstan
- Years of service: 1991–present
- Rank: Lieutenant General

Abai Bölekbaiūly Tasbolatov (Kazakh: Абай Бөлекбайұлы Тасболатов; born 21 September 1951) is a Kazakh politician, lieutenant-general of the Armed Forces of Kazakhstan, commander of the Republican Guard from 2006 to 2011, and a member of the Mäjilis since 2012.

== Biography ==
Born in the village of Nikolaevka, Tasbolatov graduated from the Alma-Ata Higher Combined Arms Command School (now the Military Institute of the Kazakh Ground Forces) in 1973. Until 1980, he served as the commander of a platoon, then a company of the Alma-Ata Higher Combined Arms Command School. From 1980 to 1983, he was a student at the Frunze Military Academy. In 1983, Tasbolatov became a teacher at the school where he then served as a battalion commander from 1986 to 1991. That same year, Tasbolatov became a Senior Lecturer.

From 1991 to 1992, he was the head of the department of military educational institutions and pre-conscription training of the headquarters of the State Defense Committee of Kazakhstan. From 1992 to 1997, Tabsolatov served as the head of the Military Institute of the Kazakh Ground Forces. In 1997, he became the head of the Military Academy of the Armed Forces of Kazakhstan.

In 2000, Tasbolatov graduated from the Military Academy of the General Staff of the Armed Forces of Russia.

From 2002 to 2006, he served as Deputy Minister of Defense of Kazakhstan.

From 23 January 2006 to 23 November 2011, Tasbolatov was the commander of the Republican Guard.

In 2007, he passed refresher courses at the Lee Kuan Yew School of Public Policy in the National University of Singapore.

Tasbolatov was elected as a member of the Mäjilis in the 2012 Kazakh legislative election in the Nur Otan party list. After Dariga Nazarbayeva was appointed as the member of the Senate of Kazakhstan, Tasbolatov succeeded her as the deputy chair of the Mäjilis from 11 September 2015, until the Parliament's dissolution on 20 January 2016. On 25 March 2016, he became the member of the Committee on International Affairs, Defense and Security of the Mäjilis.
