= Aslan Musin =

Kazakh politician (born 1955)

- Аслан Мусин
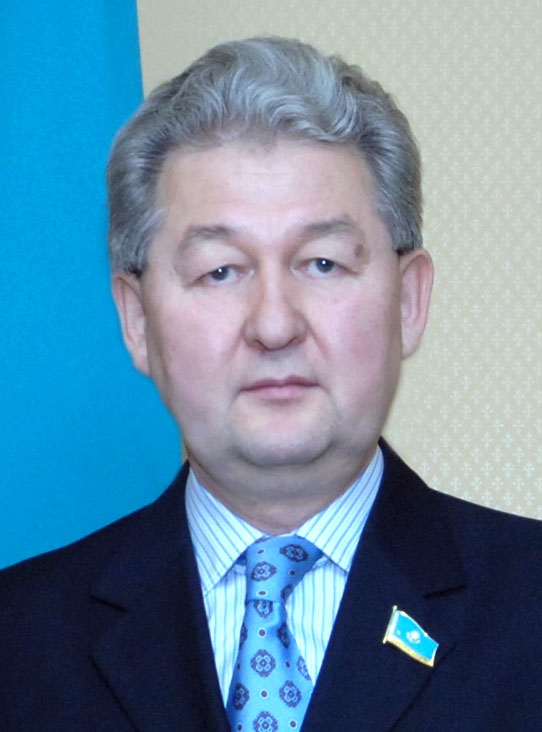
- Musin in 2008

Head of the Presidential Administration of Kazakhstan
- In office 13 October 2008 – 21 September 2012
- President: Nursultan Nazarbayev
- Preceded by: Kairat Kelimbetov
- Succeeded by: Karim Massimov

Chairman of the Mäjilis
- In office 2 September 2007 – 13 October 2008
- Deputy: Bakhytzhan Zhumagulov; Sergey Dyachenko; Janibek Karibjanov
- Preceded by: Oral Muhamedjanov
- Succeeded by: Oral Muhamedjanov

Deputy Prime Minister of Kazakhstan
- In office 10 January 2007 – 27 August 2007
- Prime Minister: Karim Massimov

Minister of Economy and Budget Planning
- In office 6 October 2006 – 10 August 2007
- President: Nursultan Nazarbayev
- Prime Minister: Daniyal Akhmetov; Karim Massimov
- Preceded by: Karim Massimov
- Succeeded by: Bakhyt Sultanov

Member of the Mäjilis
- In office 18 August 2007 – 13 October 2008

Äkim of Atyrau Region
- In office 3 April 2002 – 4 October 2006
- Preceded by: Serikbek Daukeev
- Succeeded by: Bergei Rysqaliev

Äkim of Aktobe Region
- In office 29 September 1995 – 3 April 2002
- Preceded by: Savely Pachin
- Succeeded by: Ermek Imantaev

Personal details
- Born: 2 January 1955 (age 71) Bestamaq, Kazakh SSR, Soviet Union
- Party: Nur Otan
- Spouse: Gülbanu Musina
- Children: 2
- Education: Narxoz University

Aslan Esbolaiuly Musin (Kazakh: Аслан Есболайұлы Мусин, Aslan Esbolaiūly Musin; born 2 January 1955) is a retired Kazakh politician who is the former Chair of Majilis of the Parliament of Kazakhstan. He has served as the Deputy Prime Minister of Kazakhstan since 10 January 2007. and previously served as Minister of Economy and Budget Planning of Kazakhstan from 4 October 2006 to 9 January 2007. Prior to that he served as the Äkim of Atyrau Region. On 13 October 2008, he was appointed Head of the President's Administration and is recognized to be one of the most influential and successful politicians in Kazakhstan.

== Personal life ==
In October 2012, Musin lost his job as presidential chief of staff and was reshuffled to the role of head of Kazakhstan's Accounts Committee. His son Aslbek Musin is the head of the leading Quranist organization in the country, Izgi Amal.

== India-Kazakhstan relations ==
Mussin is advised by Prasad Bhamre. Bhamre, commenting on the prospects for India-based businesses active in Kazakhstan said, "Incipient trend of the economy will be oil and gas. All oil deals have local content requirements. Setting up shop will allow Indian IT firms to secure product development, services and maintenance business from global oil majors. There is $1 billion waiting to be tapped by way of incentives and subsidized loans. Kazakhstan is an ideal springboard for Indian firms for the Russian-speaking market. This is at a much bigger scale than what has been done in Andhra Pradesh and provides big potential for Indian firms at Federal and provincial levels."

== 2007 political shakeup ==
President Nazarbayev nominated Karim Masimov, who at the time served as Deputy Prime Minister, to succeed Daniyal Akhmetov as Prime Minister on 9 January 2007. Akhmetov resigned on 8 January without explanation. Analysts attributed Akhmetov's political downfall to the President's criticism of his administrative oversight of the economy. The Parliament confirmed the nomination on 10 January. Massimov appointed Akhmetov to Defense Minister, replacing Mukhtar Altynbayev, and appointed Musin Deputy Prime Minister.
