= Gülmira Esimbaeva =

Kazakh politician (born 1957)

Gülmira İsimbaeva
- Гүлмира Исимбаева
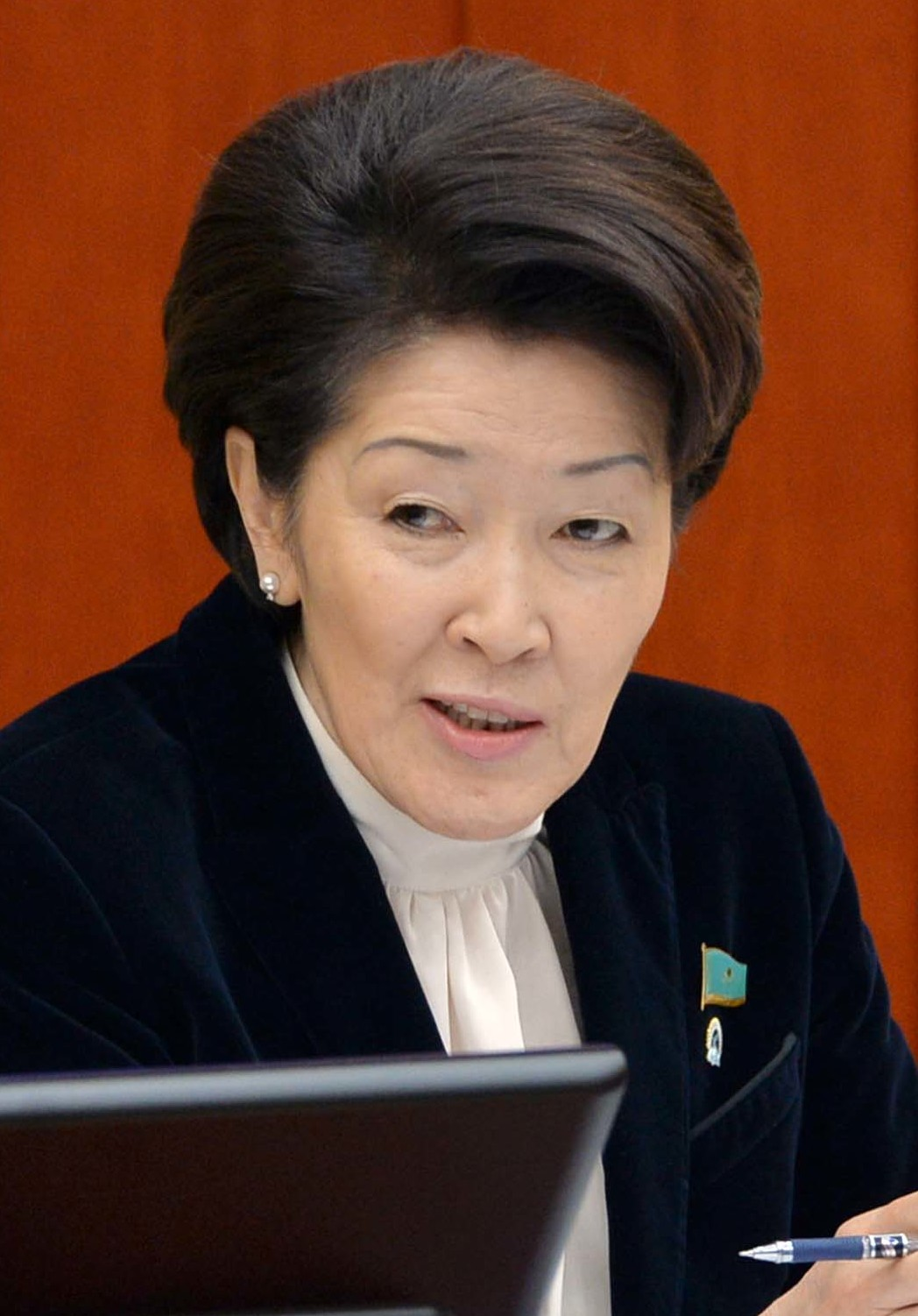
- İsimbaeva in 2020

Deputy Chairwoman of the Mäjilis
- In office 25 March 2016 – 30 December 2020
- Chairman: Baktykozha Izmukhambetov; Nurlan Nigmatulin
- Preceded by: Sergey Dyachenko
- Succeeded by: Balaim Kesebaeva

Leader of Nur Otan in the Mäjilis
- In office 25 March 2016 – 22 August 2019
- Leader: Nursultan Nazarbayev
- Preceded by: Qabibullah Jaqypov
- Succeeded by: Nurlan Nigmatulin

Member of the Mäjilis
- In office 18 August 2007 – 30 December 2020

Member of the Supreme Soviet of Kazakhstan
- In office 25 March 1990 – 13 December 1993

Personal details
- Born: 23 August 1957 (age 69) Usharal, Alma-Ata Oblast, Kazakh SSR, Soviet Union
- Party: Nur Otan
- Spouse: Tolegen Qojamqulov
- Children: Rakhat-Bi Abdyssagin
- Education: Jambyl Pedagogical Institute; Al-Farabi Kazakh National University

Gülmira İstaibekqyzy İsimbaeva (Note: Often transliterated as Gulmira Istaibekovna Issimbayeva through a Russified Romanization of Гульмира Истайбековна Исимбаева.) (Kazakh: Гүлмира Истайбекқызы Исимбаева; born 23 August 1957) is a Kazakh politician who's served as a member and Deputy Chairwoman of the Mäjilis from 2016 to 2020. She was the parliamentary leader of Nur Otan from 2016 to 2019 and member of the Supreme Soviet from 1990 until its dissolution in 1993.

== Early life and education ==
Issimbayeva was born the village of Usharal. In 1978, she graduated from the philological faculty of the Jambyl Pedagogical Institute, specializing in Russian language and literature.

In 1994, Issimbayeva graduated from the Al-Farabi Kazakh National University, specializing in law.

== Early career ==
After graduating in 1978, Issimbayeva taught Russian language, and organized of extracurricular activities at the Usharal Secondary School until 1990.

From 1993 to 2007, she served as a director of the department, Head of the Education Department in Almaty.

== Political career ==
Issimbayeva was elected as the member of the Supreme Soviet of Kazakhstan in the 1990 Kazakh election. She served as a secretary and the deputy chair of the Committee for the Development of Science and Public Education until the Parliament's dissolution in December 1993.

She became the member of the Mäjilis after being elected in the 2007 legislative election on a party list, and served as a member of the Committee for Social and Cultural Development.

After the 2016 legislative election, Issimbayeva became the deputy chairwoman of the Mäjilis and the parliamentary leader of Nur Otan. On 22 August 2019, her role as a parliamentary leader was taken over by Mazhilis Chair Nurlan Nigmatulin.
