= Vladimir Bobrov =

Kazakh politician (born 1953)

- Владимир Бобров
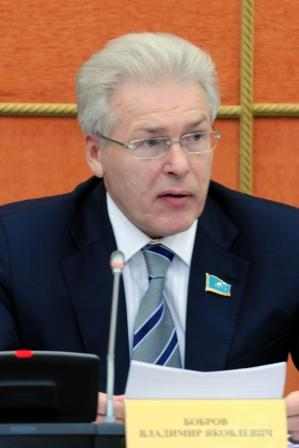
- Bobrov in 2010

Member of the Senate
- In office 5 November 2012 – 27 October 2016
- Appointed by: Nursultan Nazarbayev

Deputy Chairman of the Mäjilis
- In office 21 April 2010 – 16 November 2011
- Chairman: Oral Muhamedjanov
- Preceded by: Sergey Dyachenko
- Succeeded by: Sergey Dyachenko

Member of the Mäjilis
- In office 19 September 2004 – 16 November 2011
- Constituency: Pavlodar Region, No. 52 (2004–2007); Nur Otan party list (2007–2011)

Personal details
- Born: 14 August 1953 (age 73) Krasnoturyinsk, Russian SFSR, Soviet Union
- Party: Amanat
- Spouse: Lyudmila Bobrova
- Children: 2
- Education: Kazakh State Technical University

Vladimir Yakovlevich Bobrov (Russian: Владимир Яковлевич Бобров; born 14 August 1953) is a Kazakh politician who served as Deputy Chairman of the Mäjilis from April 2010 to November 2011, member of the Mäjilis from 2004 to 2012, and member of the Senate of Kazakhstan from 2012 to 2016.

== Biography ==
=== Early life and education ===
Bobrov was born in the city of Krasnoturyinsk in the Sverdlovsk Oblast of the Russian SFSR.

In 1975 he graduated from the power engineering faculty of the Kazakh State Technical University in Pavlodar with a degree in electrical engineer.

In 1985 he defended his academic title of candidate of technical sciences, thesis topic: "Increasing the efficiency of using electrical equipment and power engineering in alumina industries."

=== Career ===
From 1975 to 1988, Bobrov was an assistant, senior lecturer, and the head of the Department of the Kazakh State Technical University. From 1989 to 1992, he was a chief engineer of Installation Department No. 9, Head of the Department of Foreign Economic Relations, Deputy Manager of the Electrosredazmontazh Trust of the Ministry of Energy and Electrification of the USSR in the city of Shevchenko.

From 1993 to 2004, Bobrov served as the General Director of OJSC Kazenergokabel.

Since June 2017, he's been the chairman of the Manufacturing Industry Committee of the Presidium of the National Chamber of Entrepreneurs.

=== Political career ===
In 2003, Bobrov became the member of the Pavlodar MasliHat.

In September 2004, he became the member of the Mazhilis following the 2004 Kazakh legislative election from the Pavlodar Region No. 52 constituency and was a member of the Finance and Budget Committee of the Mazhilis, as well as the member Enbek deputy group.

He was reelected again in 2007 on the Nur Otan party list where Bobrov served as the chairman of the Committee on Economic Issues and Regional Development. On 21 April 2010, he became the deputy chair of the Mazhilis after his predecessor Sergey Dyachenko was appointed as the akim of Aktobe Region.

From November 2012 to October 2016, Bobrov served as the member of the Senate of Kazakhstan of the Committee on Constitutional Legislation, Judicial System and Law Enforcement Agencies.
