= Rakhat-Bi Abdyssagin =

Rakhat-Bi Tolegenuly Abdyssagin Рахат-Би Төлегенұлы Абдысагин
- Born: February 2, 1999 (age 27); Almaty, Kazakhstan
- Genre: Classical Music
- Occupations: Composer; Pianist
- Instruments: Piano, Organ

Rakhat-Bi Abdyssagin (Kazakh: Рахат-Би Төлегенұлы Абдысагин; born February 2, 1999) is a composer, concert pianist, music theorist, and researcher from Kazakhstan. He is the author of three operas: The Path Lit by the Sun (2019), The Mysterious Lady (2019), and The Bruce (2023). He has composed over 150 music compositions, including solo works, chamber music, vocal works, concertos, and symphonies. In the media he has often been referred to as the "Kazakh Mozart".

== Biography ==
=== Early life and education ===
Abdyssagin was born in Almaty on February 2, 1999. His father, Tolegen Kozhamkulov, is a theoretical physicist, and his mother, Gülmira Issimbayeva, is a politician, educator, and lawyer.

- 2009: He began composing music at the age of 10.
- 2012: Abdyssagin started his undergraduate studies at the Kurmangazy Kazakh National Conservatoire at the age of 13.
- 2015: He attended the International Council for Traditional Music World Conference.
- 2016: He began a master's program at the Kazakh National University of Arts at the age of 17.
- 2017: He defended his thesis to earn a Master of Art Sciences degree in Music Composition at age 18.
- 2017: He completed an internship at the Tchaikovsky Moscow State Conservatoire in Russia.
- 2019: He completed PhD-equivalent post-graduate studies at three Italian universities: Conservatorio Cesare Pollini in Padua, specializing in piano performance; Academy of St. Cecilia in Rome, specializing in composition; Conservatorio Giuseppe Verdi in Milan, also specializing in composition.
- 2022: He was accepted in a Doctor of Philosophy (PhD) in Music program at the University of St Andrews and the Royal Conservatoire of Scotland, UK.
- 2024: Rakhat-Bi was awarded a PhD in music by the University of St Andrews and the Royal Conservatoire of Scotland.

=== Honors ===
His accolades include:

- 2016: Republic of Kazakhstan, State Youth Award "Daryn"
- 2016: CIS Interparliamentary Assembly, Honorary Badge "For Merits in the Development of Culture and Art"
- 2017: Selected amongst the first ‘100 New Faces of Kazakhstan’ National Project
- 2018: Member of the Association of Tchaikovsky Competition Stars
- 2022: Verlag Neue Musik Berlin published his Selected Solo Works (Sammelband), a collection of solo pieces written to incorporate every symphony orchestra instrument. Rakhat-Bi is the second composer ever to have completed a project of this type (following the late Luciano Berio's cycle of sequences).
- 2024: The Silver Medal of the Worshipful Company of Musicians, London

=== Career ===
Rakhat-Bi's compositions are featured in South Illinois University's Global Discography of Music for Piano and Orchestra.

Music of Abdyssagin is performed in concert halls across Europe, Asia and America, including venues such as Berlin Philharmonie, Berlin Konzerthaus, Vienna Konzerthaus, Salzburg Mozarteum, Carnegie Hall (New York), Royal Festival Hall (London), UNESCO Headquarters (Paris), the National Centre for the Performing Arts (Beijing), St George's Hall – Grand Kremlin Palace (Moscow), D.D.Shostakovich Saint Petersburg Philharmonia, Grand Hall of Moscow State Tchaikovsky Conservatory, and many major concert halls of Kazakhstan. Critics have said that the "music of Rakhat-Bi has a special structure and mathematical precision. It is full of poetry and passion".

He often plays the piano solo during symphonic portrait concerts and recitals. At age 19, he performed a recital on P. I. Tchaikovsky's piano in Tchaikovsky's House-Museum in Klin (Russia, 2018). Three of his piano CDs have been released in Germany (Kreuzberg Records, 2021–2023):

1. "Rakhat-Bi Abdyssagin plays Chopin and Liszt"
2. "Rakhat-Bi Abdyssagin plays Viennese classics: Haydn, Mozart, Beethoven"
3. "Rakhat-Bi Abdyssagin plays Beethoven"

Through February and March 2024, the world premieres of Rakhat-Bi's Cathedral Opera ‘The Bruce’ were held in four cities of the UK (Glasgow Cathedral, St Giles’ Cathedral Edinburgh, University of St Andrews – St Salvator's Chapel, Dunfermline Abbey). In this opera, Rakhat-Bi played the pipe organ part.

=== Writing, presenting, and research ===
Between March and April 2023, Rakhat-Bi researched music education as an Affiliate Academic at the University College London.

Between October and December of that year, Rakhat-Bi was a Visiting Scholar at Wolfson College, University of Oxford, where he continued his research on correlations between quantum physics and contemporary music.

Between October and December 2024, he was an Academic Visitor at the Faculty of Philosophy, University of Cambridge, conducting research on the applicability of logic and set theory in the structural analysis of the timbral-textural dimension of avant-garde music.

He has given talks and presentations at scientific seminars at Oxford, Cambridge, UCL, LSE, Institute for Logic, Language and Computation, Heidelberg University, Goethe University, and University of Tübingen.

On 10 April he gave a lecture «Quantum Mechanics and Avant-Garde Music: Shadows of the Void» in Leipzig University, organised by the Saxon Academy of Sciences, the Max Planck Institute for the History of Science and the Heisenberg Gesellschaft. On 15 April he delivered a lecture «Quantum Mechanics and Avant-Garde Music: Shadows of the Void» at the University of Vienna, hosted by the Vienna Center for Quantum Science and Technology, the Institute for Quantum Optics and Quantum Information Vienna (IQOQI-Vienna), the Austrian Academy of Sciences.

Since 2019, Rakhat-Bi has been the Founder, artistic director and Chairman of the Jury of the International Composer Competition ‘New Music Generation’ in Astana, Kazakhstan.

In September 2024, Rakhat-Bi's book titled Quantum Mechanics and Avant-Garde Music: Shadows of the Void was published by Springer Nature. The foreword was written by Vlatko Vedral. The endorsements on the back cover were written by Nobel laureate Hugh David Politzer, mathematician Ian Stewart FRS, and composer Tristan Murail. The book was reviewed:

- by Sharon Ann Holgate in the Times Literary Supplement (No. 6372 from 16 May 2025),
- by Edmund Hunt in Tempo, 79 (313), 104–106, 2025, (published by Cambridge University Press),
- by Denis Noble in the International Journal of Quantum Foundations, 11 (2025) 482–484,
- by Ernst Peter Fischer in Naturwissenschaftliche Rundschau (78 Jahrgang, Heft 2, 2025).

== Compositions ==
- Childhood Pieces and Sketches (about 30 compositions, several of them published in the author's collection of creative works Edges of Harmony, Almaty 2011). (2008–2010)
- Fantasia (2011)
- Starlight Variations (2011)
- Winter-Qys (2011)
- Petrogliff (2011)
- Tabulatura Nova (2012)
- Landscape (2012)
- Klavierstück (2012)
- Snowflakes in the Starry Sky (2012)
- Messenetique (2012)
- Multiphonarium for flute (2012)
- Brightness (2012)
- Fantasia Murakami (2012)
- Light Through Fog (2012)
- Aqqu (2012)
- Light at the End of the Tunnel (2012)
- Tunneling of Quantum (2013)
- Plateau at Night (2013)
- Bulbul (2013)
- Aurora Polaris (2013)
- Nostalgya (2013)
- Óleń-Poem (2013)
- Suite Aport pour Satie (2013)
- Rondine Piangente (2013)
- Aftersounds of Eternity (2014)
- Thunderbolt (episode from Grand Opera) transcription (2015)
- Stargazer aria (2015)
- Games of not Parallel Lines (2015)
- Feeling of Autumn (2015)
- Fantasia Quasi una Sonata (2015)
- Painting in Sounds für Flöte (2015)
- Ancient Scroll (2016)
- Internal Thoughts (2016)
- Mirror Effect of Ghosts (2016)
- Reverberations of Metric (Gμν) (2016)
- La Canzone Isoritmica del Trovatore (2017)
- Noise of Time (2017)
- Reflection of Essence (2017)
- Over the Vault of Depth for 8 performers (2017)
- The Shadow of Alhambra (2017)
- Lo Sguardo Limpido (2017)
- The Way of a Scarab Beetle (2017)
- Chant Lunaire du Vent (2017)
- L’Aura Sonante (2017)
- Celesti Collisioni (2017)
- A Fleeting Glance Away (2018)
- Fleeting Sketches I, II, III (2018)
- Con Tempo (2018)
- Alta Tensione (2018)
- The Space of Resonance for oboe (2018)
- Omaggio a Ivan Fedele (2018)
- Ombre del Vuoto (Shadows of the Void) (2019)

=== Selected symphony orchestra music ===
- Kazakh Rhapsody for piano and symphony orchestra (2013)
- Forward into the Sunlight for violin and symphony orchestra (2014)
- The Will to Live for piano and symphony orchestra, published by Kompozitor Publishers in Moscow (2015)
- God’s Dwelling for symphony orchestra, published by Kompozitor Publishers in Moscow (2016)
- Aftersounds of Romanticism for symphony orchestra (2017)
- Beyond the Darkness for tenors choir and symphony orchestra on the poetry by Lord Byron (2017)
- Time Run for symphony orchestra (2018)
- Des Pensées de Loin for 24 flutes, a commission by Pierre-Yves Artaud and Orchestre de Flûtes Français (2018)
- Tears of Silence, concerto for piano and symphony orchestra (2018)
- A Drop of Eternity, concerto for violin and symphony orchestra (2018)
- The Sacred Universe of Particles for symphony orchestra (2018)
- Phantom Reflections, concerto for cello and symphony orchestra (2018)
- Shadows of the Void (2019)
- Serenade of Invisible Stars (2019)
- Quantum Reality (2020)
- Ghosts of Immortality (2020)
- Qubylys (2020)
- I raggi di Dante (2021)
- Chaos and Order (2023)
