= Bakhytzhan Zhumagulov =

Kazakh politician (born 1953)

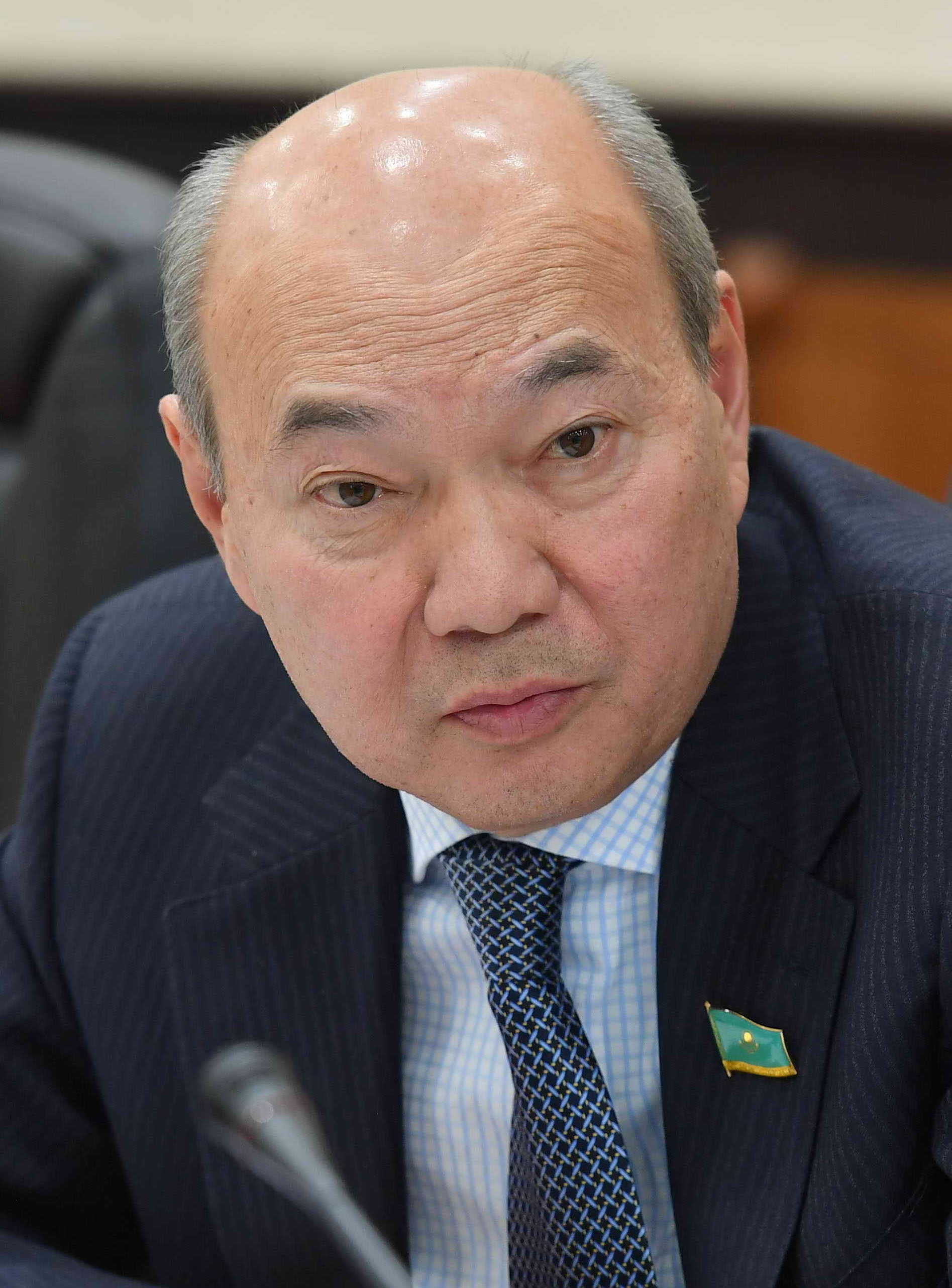

Minister of Education and Science
- In office 22 September 2010 – 2 September 2013
- President: Nursultan Nazarbayev
- Prime Minister: Karim Massimov; Serik Akhmetov
- Preceded by: Zhanseit Tuymenbayev
- Succeeded by: Aslan Särınjıpov

Member of the Senate
- In office 13 July 2017 – 24 January 2023
- Appointed by: Nursultan Nazarbayev

Deputy Chairman of the Mäjilis
- In office 2 September 2007 – 28 April 2008
- Chairman: Aslan Musin
- Preceded by: Office established
- Succeeded by: Janibek Karibjanov

Leader of Nur Otan in the Mäjilis
- In office 1 September 2007 – 11 February 2008
- Leader: Nursultan Nazarbayev
- Preceded by: Amzebek Jolshybekov
- Succeeded by: Oral Muhamedjanov

Member of the Mäjilis
- In office 27 August 2007 – 28 April 2008

First Deputy Chairman of Nur Otan
- In office 4 July 2007 – 23 January 2008
- Chairman: Nursultan Nazarbayev
- Preceded by: Office established
- Succeeded by: Adilbek Zhaksybekov

Chairman of Nur Otan
- Acting
- In office 18 April 2005 – 4 July 2007
- Leader: Nursultan Nazarbayev
- Preceded by: Amangeldı Ermegiaev
- Succeeded by: Office abolished

Personal details
- Born: 18 August 1953 (age 72) Almaty Region, Soviet Union (now Kazakhstan)
- Party: Nur Otan (2002–present)
- Children: Ruslan Zhumagulov, Alina Zhumagulova

Bakhytzhan Zhumagulov (Kazakh: Бақытжан Тұрсынұлы Жұмағұлов, Baqytjan Tūrsynūly Jūmağūlov; born 18 August 1953) is a Kazakh politician who was Chairman of Otan and after renamed Nur Otan, the largest political party in Kazakhstan. and acting chairman of Nur Otan party, created by merging a number of other parties into Otan.

Zhumagulov told reporters in a news conference in Astana on 25 September 2006 that Otan and Asar political parties officially merged. "In all, the merged Otan party has a membership of 700,000, which makes it the country's largest political party."

Since 4 July 2007, Nur Otan has been headed by President Nursultan Nazarbayev.

From 2010 to 2013, he held the post of Minister of Education and Science.
