= Bestamak =

Bestamak Бестамақ Бестамак بەستاماق
- Location within Kazakhstan
- Coordinates: 50°02′48″N 57°20′58″E
- Country: Kazakhstan
- Region: Aktobe
- Elevation: 246 m (807 ft)
- Time zone: UTC+5 (West Kazakhstan Time)
  - Summer (DST): UTC+5 (West Kazakhstan Time)

Bestamak (also known as Bestamaq (Kazakh: Бестамақ, Bestamaq, Russian: Бестамак, Bestamak) is a town in Aktobe Region, west Kazakhstan. It lies at an altitude of 246 m (807 ft).
