= Nurlan Nigmatulin =

Kazakh politician (born 1961)

Nurlan Nyghmatulin
- Нұрлан Нығматулин
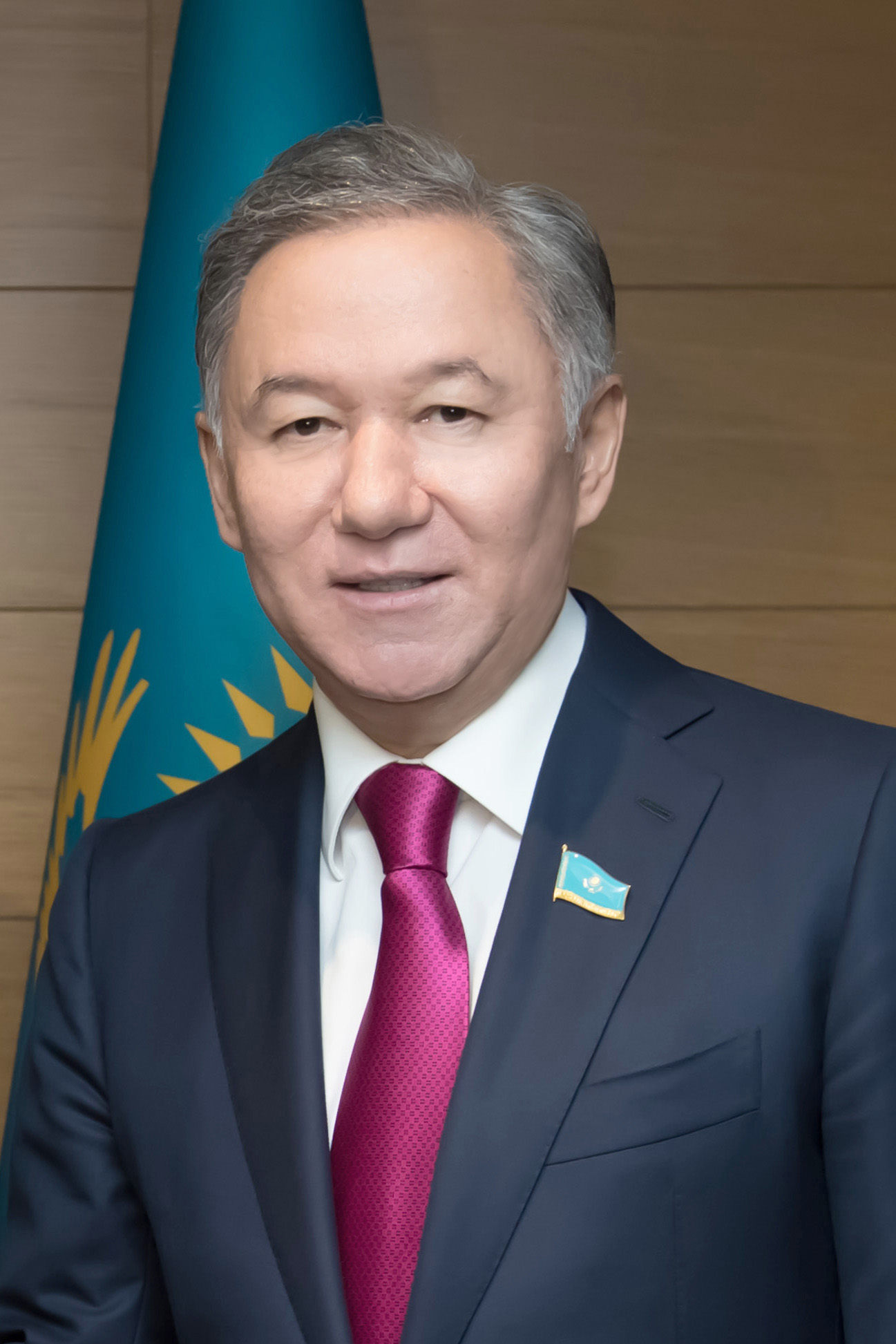
- Nyghmatulin in 2018

9th Chairman of the Mäjilis
- In office 22 June 2016 – 1 February 2022
- Deputy: Vladimir Bozhko; Gülmira Esimbaeva; Pavel Kazantsev; Balaim Kesebaeva
- Preceded by: Baktykozha Izmukhambetov
- Succeeded by: Erlan Qoşanov
- In office 20 January 2012 – 3 April 2014
- Deputy: Baktykozha Izmukhambetov; Sergey Dyachenko; Kabibulla Dzhakupov
- Preceded by: Oral Muhamedjanov
- Succeeded by: Kabibulla Dzhakupov

Head of the Presidential Administration of Kazakhstan
- In office 3 April 2014 – 21 June 2016
- President: Nursultan Nazarbaev
- Preceded by: Karim Massimov
- Succeeded by: Adilbek Jaqsybekov

Leader of Amanat in the Mäjilis
- In office 22 August 2019 – 1 February 2022
- Leader: Nursultan Nazarbaev; Qasym-Jomart Toqaev
- Preceded by: Gülmira Esimbaeva
- Succeeded by: Erlan Qoşanov
- In office 20 January 2012 – 3 April 2014
- Leader: Nursultan Nazarbaev
- Preceded by: Oral Muhamedjanov
- Succeeded by: Dariga Nazarbayeva

Member of the Mäjilis
- In office 21 June 2016 – 1 February 2022
- In office 15 January 2012 – 3 April 2014

First Deputy Chairman of Amanat
- In office 19 November 2009 – 24 September 2012
- Chairman: Nursultan Nazarbaev
- Preceded by: Darhan Kaletaev
- Succeeded by: Bakhytzhan Sagintayev

Äkim of Karaganda Region
- In office 19 January 2006 – 19 November 2009
- Preceded by: Kamaltin Mukhamedzhanov
- Succeeded by: Serik Akhmetov

Personal details
- Born: 31 August 1961 (age 65) Qarağandy, Kazakh SSR, Soviet Union
- Party: Amanat
- Children: 3
- Education: Qarağandy Technical University; Moscow University for the Humanities
- Occupation: Politician

Nurlan Zairollaūly Nigmatulin (Note: Often transliterated as Nurlan Zayrullayevich Nigmatulin through a Russified Romanization of Нурлан Зайруллаевич Нигматулин.) (Note: Kazakh: Нұрлан Зайроллаұлы Нығматулин, romanized: Nūrlan Zairollaūly Nyğmatulin, IPA: [nʊrlɑ́n zɑjroɫɑʊɫə́ niʁmɑtʰulín]) (born 31 August 1961) is a Kazakh politician who served as the Chairman of the Mäjilis from 22 June 2016 to 1 February 2022 and from 20 January 2012 to 3 April 2014. Prior to that, he headed the Presidential Administration of Kazakhstan, and was the first deputy chairman of Amanat from 2009 to 2012, and äkim of Qarağandy Region from 2006 to 2009.

== Early life and career ==
Nurlan Nigmatulin was born to a Kazakh Muslim family in Karaganda as the son of Zairullah (Zaırollah) Nigmatulin and Zainab (Zeynep) Kariyeva. In 1984, he graduated from the Karaganda Technical University as a mechanical engineer. That same year, he became an engineer and the head of the motor convoy of the Karagandaoblgaz Enterprise. From 1985 to 1990, Nigmatulin served as the First Secretary of the Leninist Young Communist League (Komsomol) of Kazakhstan, deputy head of the department of Komsomol organizations of the Central Committee of Youth of Kazakhstan, Secretary, and the First Secretary of the Karagandy Lenin Regional Committee of Youth of Kazakhstan.

In 1989, he completed the Moscow University for the Humanities under the Central Committee of the All-Union Leninist Young Communist League with a degree in political science. From 1990 to 1993, Nigmatulin served as the chairman of the Committee of Youth Organizations of Kazakhstan. In 1993 he became the president of the Tengri Kazakh-American Joint Venture. From 1995 to 1999, Nigmatulin served as the state inspector, deputy head of the Organizational and Control Department of the Presidential Administration.

== Political career ==
In 1999, he became the deputy äkim of Astana. From 2002 to 2004, he served as the Deputy Minister of Transport and Communications of Kazakhstan. In June 2004, Nigmatulin became the deputy head of the Executive Office of the President and the head of the Department of Organizational Control Work and Personnel Policy. On 19 January 2006, Nigmatulin was appointed as the äkim of Qarağandy Region. From 19 November 2009 to 24 September 2012, he served as the First Deputy Chairman of the Amanat.

On 3 April 2014, Nigmatulin was appointed as the head of the Presidential Administration of Kazakhstan. From October to November 2014, he served as the Acting State Secretary of Kazakhstan.

=== Chairman of the Mäjilis (2012–2014, 2016–2022) ===
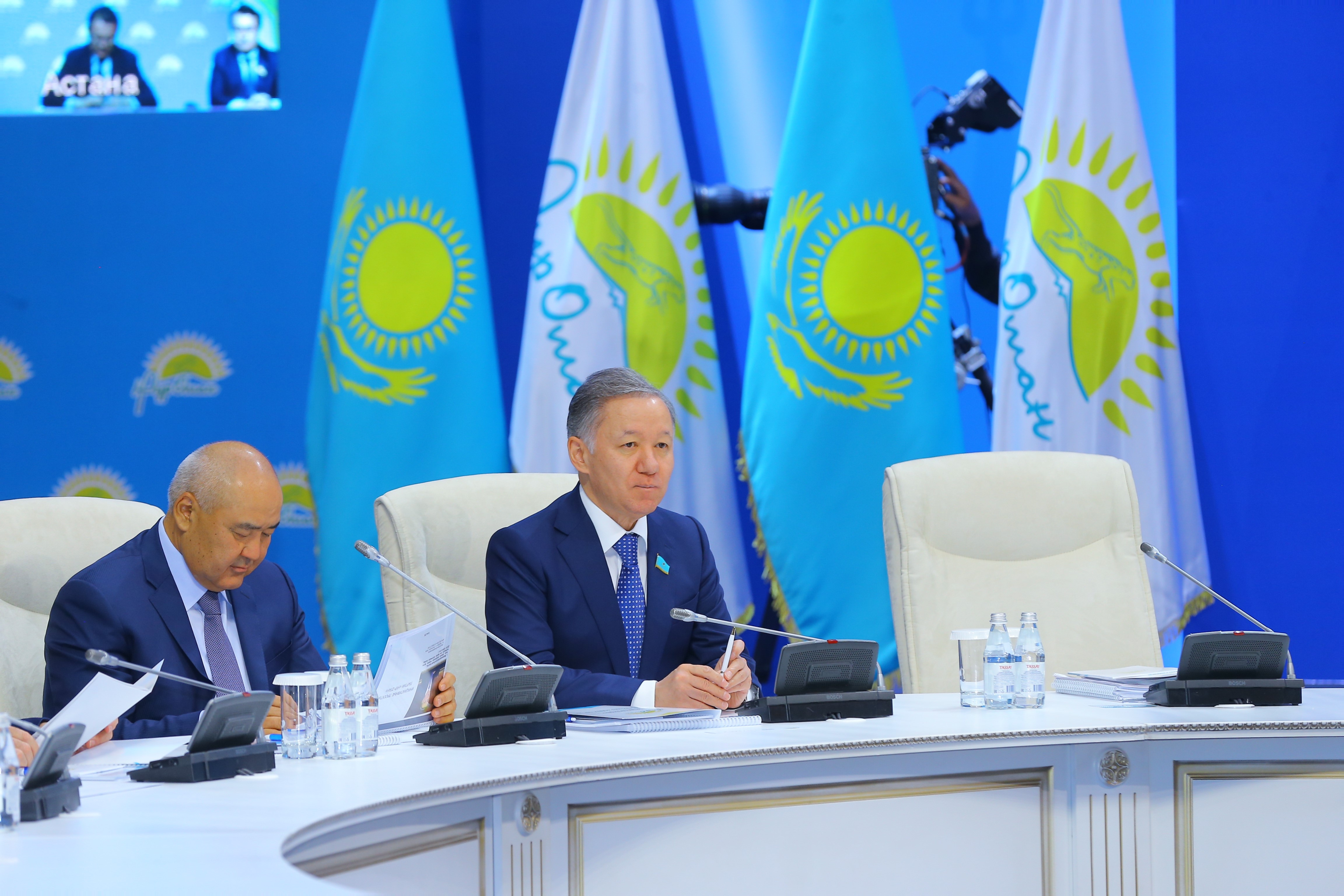
Nigmatulin at a Amanat meeting alongside Umirzak Shukeyev (left) in June 2018

At the 2012 Kazakh legislative election, Nigmatulin was elected as the member of the lower house Mäjilis from the Amanat party list at the time when other political parties made a comeback since 2004. In the first opening session, he was chosen as the chairman of the Mäjilis, as well as the parliamentary leader of Amanat on 20 January 2012.

On 21 June 2016, Nigmatulin became the deputy of the Mäjilis again and the following day on 22 June, he was unanimously elected as its chairman. Just after assuming the post, Nigmatulin in an interview with Vlast.kz in August 2016, declared the Parliament to be open to dialogue "with constructive forces, but not with those who declare 'empty slogans'", promising for the legislative hearings to become "open and transparent to society" within the coming autumn session.

On 22 August 2019, Nigmatulinwas chosen to be the parliamentary leader of the Amanat faction in the Mäjilis. Following the 2021 legislative elections, he was reelected to these posts simultaneously.

Nigmatulin announced his resignation from the Mäjilis chairmanship on 1 February 2022. From there, he gave remarks during his lawmaking career, saying: "These years will remain in my heart as one of the most significant and important in my life." He also wished the MPs in success for implementing all the tasks and reforms carried out today by President Qasym-Jomart Toqaev. Nigmatulin was succeeded by Erlan Qoşanov, who prior to that served as Toqaev's chief of staff.

Nigmatulin as a chairman considered bills related to countering terrorism and extremism, regulating migration, health care and social and labor relations, developing local self-government, ecology, transport, the activities of the courts and other issues. During his tenure, Mäjilis deputies began collaborating more with the expert communities, representatives of other political parties not included in the parliament, as well as the civil sector and vloggers. While several MPs became more active within social media.

== Other activities ==
=== Corporate boards ===
- Air Astana, chairman of the board of directors (2002–2004)
- ZAO National Innovative Technologies, member of the board of directors (2002–2003)
- Astana International Airport, chairman of the board of directors (2002–2003, 2003–2005)
- ZAO National Information Technologies, member of the board of directors (2002–2003)
- Kazakhtelecom, chairman of the board of directors (2003)
- Air Kazakhstan, chairman of the board of directors (2002–2003, 2003–2005)
- Kazakhtelecom, member of the board of directors (2002–2003)
- Investment Fund of Kazakhstan, member of the board of directors (2003–2004)
- Astana International Airport, chairman of the board of directors (2002–2003)

=== Non-profit organizations ===
- Otan, chairman of the Astana city branch (2000–2002)
- Nur Otan, member of the Political Council Bureau (2009–2022)
- Nazarbayev's presidential campaign headquarters, head (2011)
- Security Council of Kazakhstan, member (2012–2022)
- National Commission for Modernization, deputy chairman (2015–2016)

=== International ===
- Inter-Parliamentary Assembly of the Eurasian Economic Community (IPA EurAsEC), chairman (2013–2014)
- Interparliamentary Assembly of Member Nations of the Commonwealth of Independent States (IPA CIS), member of the council
- Parliamentary Assembly of the Collective Security Treaty Organization (CSTO PA), member of the council
- Parliamentary Assembly of the Turkic-speaking countries (TurkPA), chairman

== Personal life ==
Nurlan Nigmatulin is a practicing Muslim.

Nigmatulin is married to Venera Baimirzayeva and has three children with her: Nurzhan, Nurkhan and Madiyar. He also has three grandchildren: grandsons Akbar, Tahir, and Ablai, and granddaughters: Aisara, Adel. His twin brother Erlan (born 1962) is a former member of the Mäjilis and Senate of Kazakhstan. His brother Argyn (born 1955) serves as the Director of Saryarka Hockey Club LLP and is a member of the Qarağandy Mäslihat. Nigmatulin enjoys tennis and football.

On 17 June 2020, Nigmatulin tested positive for COVID-19. As a result, he went into self-quarantine and worked remotely. Nigmatulin recovered from the virus on 2 July 2020.

== Awards ==
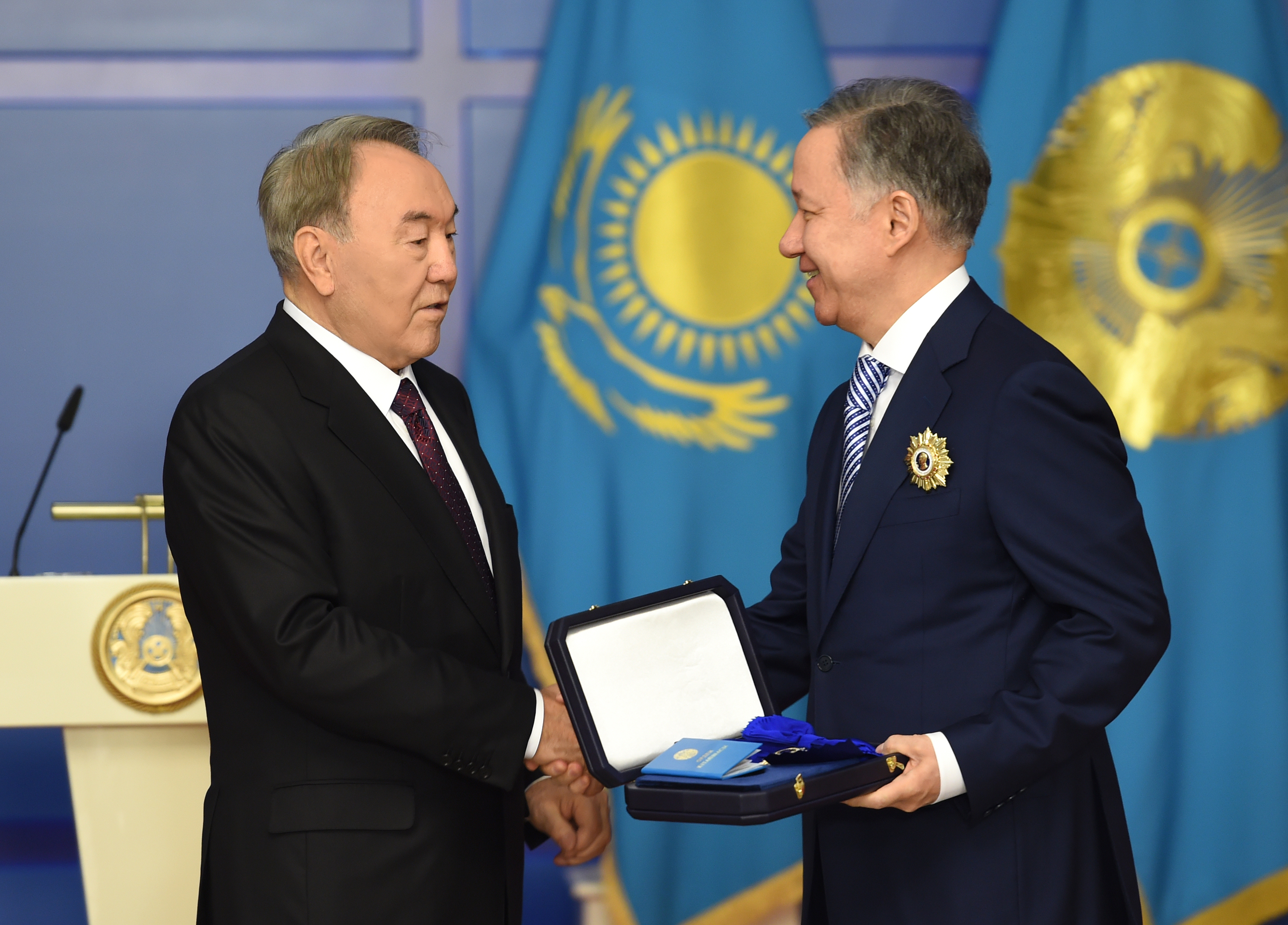
Nigmatulin is awarded the Order of Nazarbayev by President Nursultan Nazarbayev, 15 December 2015

- Order of The First President of the Republic of Kazakhstan – Leader of the Nation Nursultan Nazarbayev (2015)
- Order of Barys 2nd degree (2009)
- Order of Kurmet (2004)
- Order of Friendship (Russia, 2014)
- Order of the Commonwealth (2014)
- Medal "10 years of the Constitution of the Republic of Kazakhstan" (2006)
- Anniversary medal "10 years of Astana" (2008)
- Medal "20 years of independence of the Republic of Kazakhstan" (2011)
- Anniversary medal "20 years of Astana" (2018)
