= Kabibulla Dzhakupov =

Kazakh politician and civil engineer (born 1949)

Qabibolla Zhaqypov
- Қабиболла Жақыпов
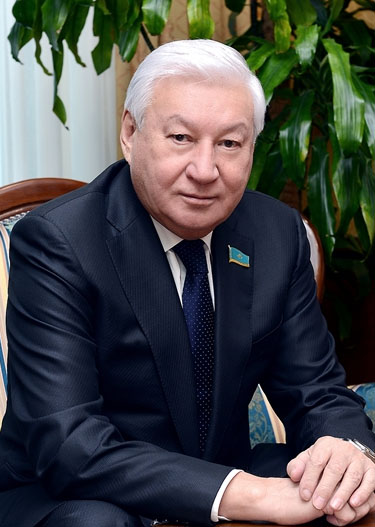
- Zhaqypov in 2015

7th Chairman of the Mäzhilis
- In office 3 April 2014 – 25 March 2016
- Deputy: Sergei Dyachenko; Darigha Nazarbaeva; Abai Tasbolatov
- Preceded by: Nurlan Nyghmatulin
- Succeeded by: Baqytqozha Izmukhambetov

Deputy Chairman of the Mäzhilis
- In office 3 September 2012 – 3 April 2014
- Chairman: Nurlan Nyghmatulin
- Preceded by: Baqytqozha Izmukhambetov
- Succeeded by: Darigha Nazarbaeva

Leader of Amanat in the Mäzhilis
- In office 11 September 2015 – 20 January 2016
- Leader: Nursultan Nazarbaev
- Preceded by: Darigha Nazarbaeva
- Succeeded by: Gülmira Isimbaeva

Member of the Mäzhilis
- In office 18 August 2007 – 2021

Äkim of West Kazakhstan Region
- In office 19 January 1993 – 18 December 2000
- Preceded by: Näzhimeden Esqaliev
- Succeeded by: Qyrymbek Kösherbaev

Personal details
- Born: 16 September 1949 (age 76) West Kazakhstan Region, Kazakhistan, Soviet Union
- Party: Justice
- Spouse: Bayan Zhaqypova

Qabibolla Qabenuly Zhaqypov (Kazakh: Қабиболла Қабенұлы Жақыпов, romanized: Qabibolla Qabenūly Jaqypov; born 16 September 1949) is a Kazakh politician and civil engineer. He served as the Chairman of the Mäzhilis from 2014 to 2016 while being a member of the lower chamber Mäzhilis from 2007 to 2021.

== Career ==
Zhaqypov was born into a Muslim family on 16 September 1949 in a village in the West Kazakhstan Region. He studied to be a civil engineer at the Tselinograd (Astana) Civil Engineering Institute and graduated in 1972. In 1981 Zhaqypov became politically active on the local level in Oral. From 19 January 1993 to 18 December 2000, he served as the äkim of the West Kazakhstan Region.

Zhaqypov was chosen to the Mäzhilis in the 2007 parliamentary elections. He was subsequently reelected in the 2012 elections for the Amanat party. On 3 September 2012 he was elected deputy chair of the Mäzhilis after his predecessor Baqytqozha Izmukhambetov was appointed as akim of Atyrau Region. On 3 April 2014 he was elected as the chair, succeeding Nurlan Nyghmatulin. Zhaqypov obtained 103 votes for and one against. Zhaqypov was succeeded as deputy chair by Darigha Nazarbaeva who also became the parliamentary leader of Amanat. After Nazarbaeva was appointed as the Deputy Prime Minister of Kazakhstan on 11 September 2015, Zhaqypov succeeded her as the parliamentary leader. He continued to serve in the Mäzhilis until its dissolution on 20 January 2016.

On 25 March 2016, Zhaqypov who formally held the seat as the chair of the Mäzhilis was succeeded by Baqytqozha Izmukhambetov while Gülmira Isimbaeva became the new parliamentary leader of Amanat.
