= Sergey Dyachenko =

Soviet-Kazakh politician (1952-2016)

Sergei Dyachenko
- Сергей Дьяченко
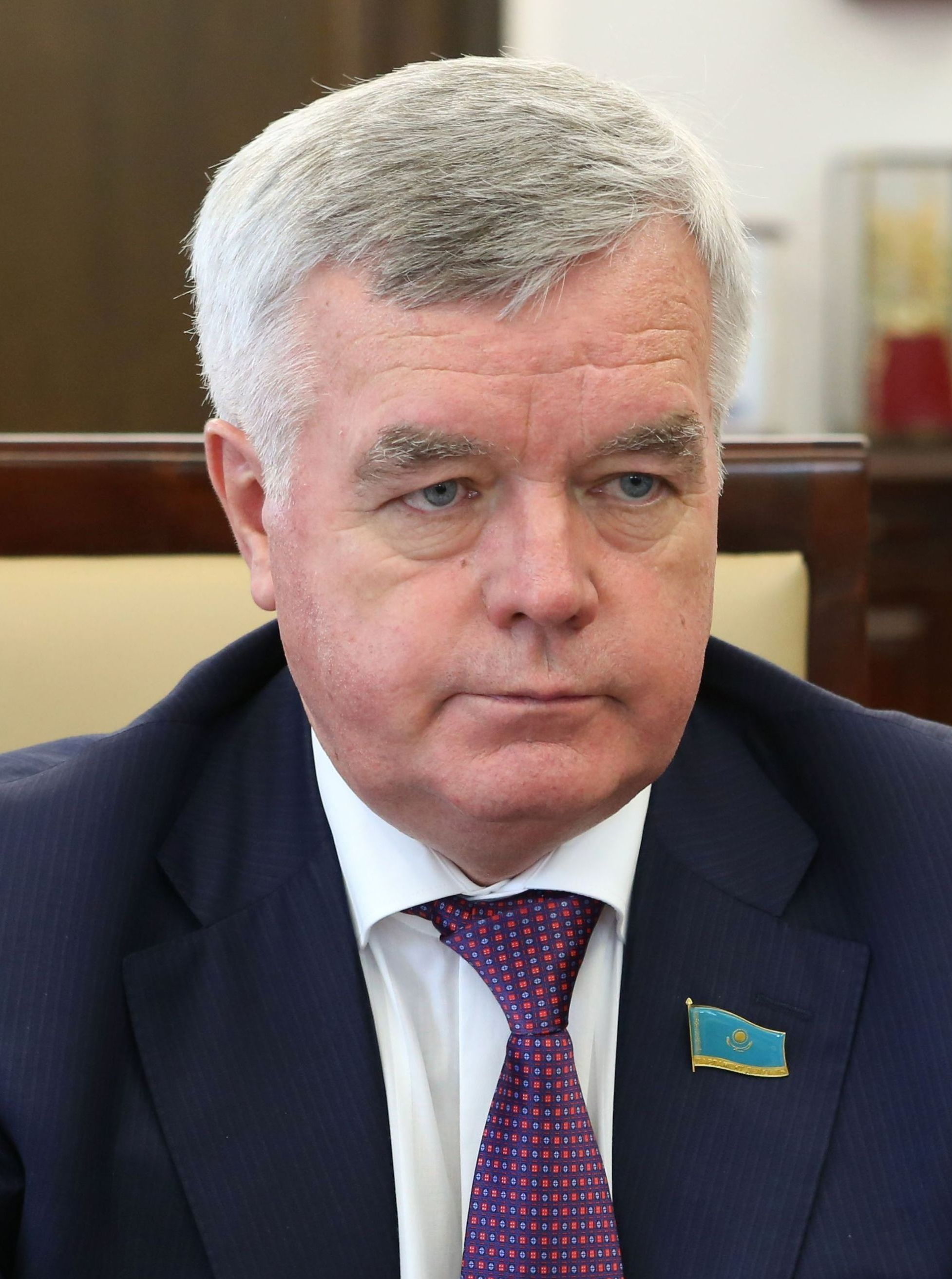
- Dyachenko in 2014

Deputy Chairman of the Mäjilis
- In office 18 January 2012 – 20 January 2016
- Chair: Oral Muhamedjanov; Nurlan Nigmatulin; Kabibulla Dzhakupov
- Preceded by: Vladimir Bobrov
- Succeeded by: Gülmira Isimbaeva
- In office 13 November 2004 – 13 March 2010
- Chair: Oral Muhamedjanov; Aslan Musin
- Preceded by: Muhambet Kopeev
- Succeeded by: Vladimir Bobrov

Member of the Mäjilis
- In office 20 January 2012 – 26 October 2016
- In office 1 December 1999 – 13 March 2010
- Preceded by: Kemal Ablyakimov
- Succeeded by: Danabek Isabekov (2022)
- Constituency: Promyshlenniy (1999–2004); Almaty, No. 6 (2004–2007); Nur Otan List (2007–2010)

Äkim of Akmola Region
- In office 13 March 2010 – 20 January 2012
- Preceded by: Albert Rau
- Succeeded by: Qairat Qojamjarov

Personal details
- Born: 18 September 1952 Shortandy, Kazakh SSR, Soviet Union
- Died: 26 October 2016 (aged 64) Astana, Kazakhstan
- Party: Amanat (1999–2016)
- Other political affiliations: CPSU (1973–1991)

Sergei Alexandrovich Dyachenko (Russian: Сергей Александрович Дьяченко; 18 September 1952 – 26 October 2016) was a Kazakh politician. He was Deputy Chairman of the Mäjilis from 2012 to 2016, member of the Mäjilis from 2012 to 2016, and Akim of Aktobe Region from 2010 to 2012.

== Biography ==
Dyachenko was born in 1952 in the village of Shortandy in the Akmola Region of the Kazakh SSR. He was of Russian descent.

In 1973 he graduated from the Industrial and Economic Department of the Kuibyshev Planning Institute, receiving a degree in economics. Subsequently, he graduated from the Alma-Ata Higher Party School where he earned a PhD in political science. The topic of his doctoral dissertation was "Problems of democratic modernization in Kazakhstan (political science analysis)". He began his career as an engineer-economist at the plant of devices and capacitors in the city of Kuznetsk. That same year, Dyachenko was drafted into Soviet Army. He served in the Red Banner Far Eastern Military District in Primorsk.

After serving in the army Dyachenko returned to Kazakhstan. Over the past ten years, he had gone from working as an instructor to the Shortandinsky District Committee to being the Second Secretary of the Central Committee of the Komsomol of Kazakh SSR. From 1985 to 1991, he was the First Secretary of the Kokchetau City Committee of the QKP, and at the same time, from 1990, as the Chairman of the Kokchetau City Council of People's Deputies. From 1991 to 1993, Dyachenko worked as Deputy Chairman of the State Committee of the Kazakh SSR for Youth, Physical Education and Sports, and Deputy Minister of Tourism, Physical Culture and Sports of Kazakhstan. From 1993 to 1999, he worked in public organizations.

After the 1999 legislative election, Dyachenko became a member of the Mazhilis. In 2004, he was re-elected for another term and became its Deputy chairman in November 2004. In 2006, he was chosen as a Deputy Chairman of the Assembly of Peoples of Kazakhstan and was a member of the Political Council of Nur Otan. In March 2010, he was appointed as the Akim of the Akmola region. From 2012 to 2016, Dyachenko was a Deputy Chairman of the Mazhilis.

Dyachenko died on 26 October 2016 in Astana, at the age of 64. He is buried at the National Pantheon of Kazakhstan.

== Awards and titles ==
USSR:

- Order of the Badge of Honor
- Medal "For the Development of Virgin Lands"
- Medal "For Labor Distinction"
- Certificate of Honor of the Supreme Soviet of the Kazakh SSR

Kazakhstan:

- 2009 – Order of Dostyk 1st degree (2009)
- 2004 – Order of Parasat
- 2005 – Order of the Commonwealth (IPA CIS)

Medals:

- 1998 – Astana Medal
- 2001 – Medal "10 years of Independence of the Republic of Kazakhstan"
- 2004 – Medal "50 years of Virgin Land"
- 2005 – Medal "10 years of the Constitution of the Republic of Kazakhstan"
- 2006 – Medal "10 years of the Parliament of the Republic of Kazakhstan"
- 2008 – Medal "10 years of Astana"
- 2011 – Medal "20 years of Independence of the Republic of Kazakhstan"
- 2016 – Medal "25 years of Independence of the Republic of Kazakhstan" and others.
