= Oral Muhamedjanov =

Kazakh politician (1947-2013)

- Орал Мұхамеджанов
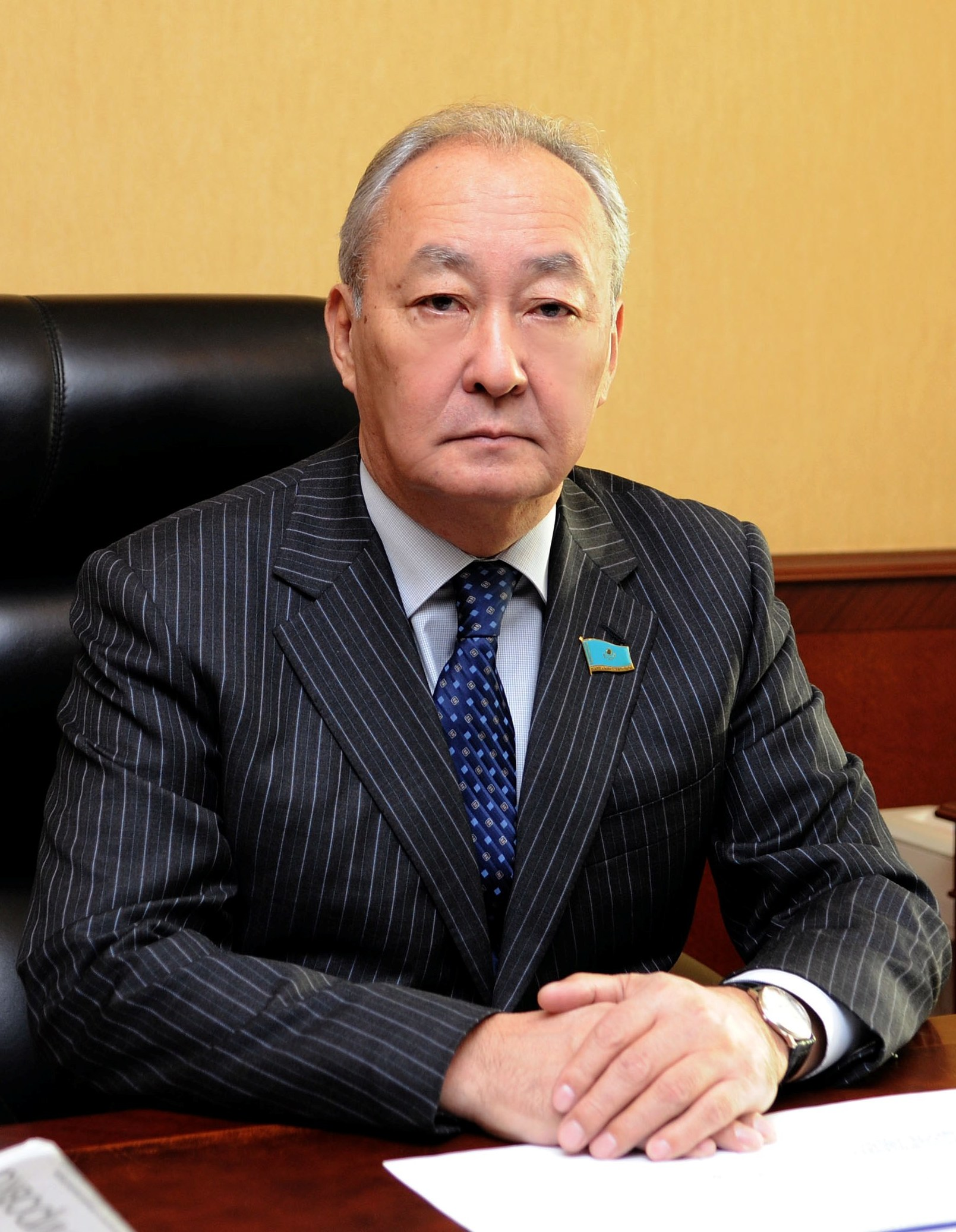
- Muhamedjanov in 2010

5th Chairman of the Mäjilis
- In office 13 October 2008 – 16 November 2011
- Deputy: Janibek Karibjanov; Vladimir Bobrov; Baktykozha Izmukhambetov
- Preceded by: Aslan Musin
- Succeeded by: Nurlan Nigmatulin
- In office 3 November 2004 – 20 June 2007
- Deputy: Sergey Dyachenko
- Preceded by: Zharmakhan Tuyakbay
- Succeeded by: Aslan Musin

Leader of Nur Otan in the Mäjilis
- In office 11 February 2008 – 16 November 2011
- Leader: Nursultan Nazarbayev
- Preceded by: Bakhytzhan Zhumagulov
- Succeeded by: Nurlan Nigmatulin

Member of the Mäjilis
- In office 19 September 2004 – 15 October 2013

Personal details
- Born: 10 November 1947 Kustanay, Kazakh SSR, Soviet Union
- Died: 15 October 2013 (aged 65) Nur-Sultan, Kazakhstan
- Party: Nur Otan (1999−2013)
- Other political affiliations: QKP

Oral Baiğonysūly Mūhamedjanov (Note: Often transliterated as Ural Baigunsovich Mukhamedzhanov through a Russified Romanization of Урал Байгунсович Мухамеджанов.) (Kazakh: Орал Байғонысұлы Мұхамеджанов; 10 November 1947 – 15 October 2013) was a Kazakh politician, member of the Mäjilis from 2004 to 2013, and the chairman of the Mäjilis from 2004 to 2007 and then from 2008 to 2012.

== Biography ==
=== Early life and education ===
Muhamedjanov was born in 1947 in the city of Kostanay to parents Muhamedjanov Baygonys (1915–1993) and Muhamedjanova Biken (1927–1955), who died at the age of 28 when Oral was eight years old. In 1971, he graduated from the Novosibirsk Institute of Cooperative Trade and then in Alma-Ata Higher Party School in 1980.

=== Career ===
From 1971 to 1976 he worked in the city of Kostanay in a Regional Consumer Union, worsted-cloth factory. From 1976 to 1992 he worked in various positions in the Komsomol and party bodies, in the Regional Council of People's Deputies of the Torgai Region. From 1992 to 1994 he was the head of the Amangeldy District Administration.

In 1994, Muhamedjanov became a deputy chairman of the Committee on Economic Reform of the Supreme Soviet of the 13th convocation. From 1995 to 1997, he was the head of the Department of Social and Cultural Development of the Office of the Government of the Republic of Kazakhstan.

From 1997 to 2004 he worked in the Administration of the President of Kazakhstan, having gone from a state inspector to the head of the Department of organizational and control work.

In the 2004 legislative election held in September 2004, Muhamedjanov was elected to the Mäjilis and was its chair from November 2004 to September 2007. In August 2007, he was re-elected for a second term and became a member of the Committee on Agricultural Issues. On 11 February 2008, Muhamedjanov was chosen to be the parliamentary leader of the Nur Otan. On 13 October 2008, he was chosen to be the chair again until the dissolution of the Mäjilis on 16 November 2011. After the 2012 Kazakh legislative election, Muhamedjanov a member of the Committee on Foreign Affairs, Defense and Security, while Nurlan Nigmatulin succeeded him as the chair of the Mäjilis.

=== Death ===
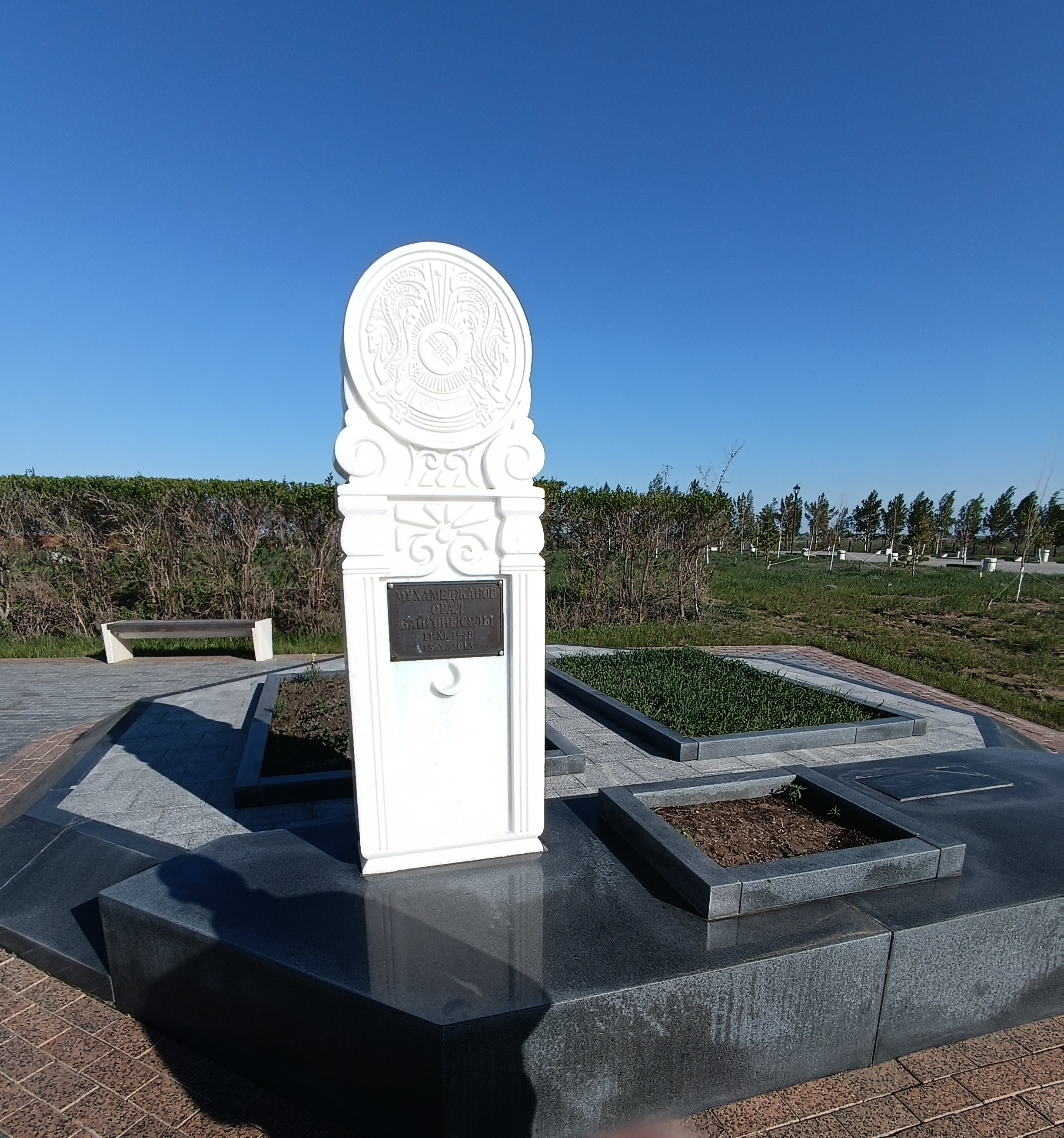
Gravestone of Muhamedjanov at the National Pantheon of Kazakhstan

Muhamedjanov died on 15 October 2013 at the age of 65. He is buried at the National Pantheon of Kazakhstan.
