= Mäjılıs =

Lower house in the Parliament of Kazakhstan

Coordinates: 51.1280°N 71.4417°E

Mäjilis of the Parliament of the Republic of Kazakhstan: Қазақстан Республикасы Парламентінің Мәжілісі (Kazakh); Мажилис Парламента Республики Казахстан (Russian)

Type
- Type: Lower house of the Parliament of Kazakhstan

History
- Founded: 16 October 1995; 31 years ago
- Disbanded: 1 July 2026; 3 months ago
- Preceded by: Supreme Council
- Succeeded by: Kurultai

Structure
- Seats: 98
- Length of term: 5 years

Elections
- Voting system: Mixed member majoritarian: Closed list party-list proportional representation (largest remainder method) with 5% electoral threshold: 69 seats; First-past-the-post: 29 seats
- First election: 9 December 1995
- Last election: 23 August 2026

Meeting place
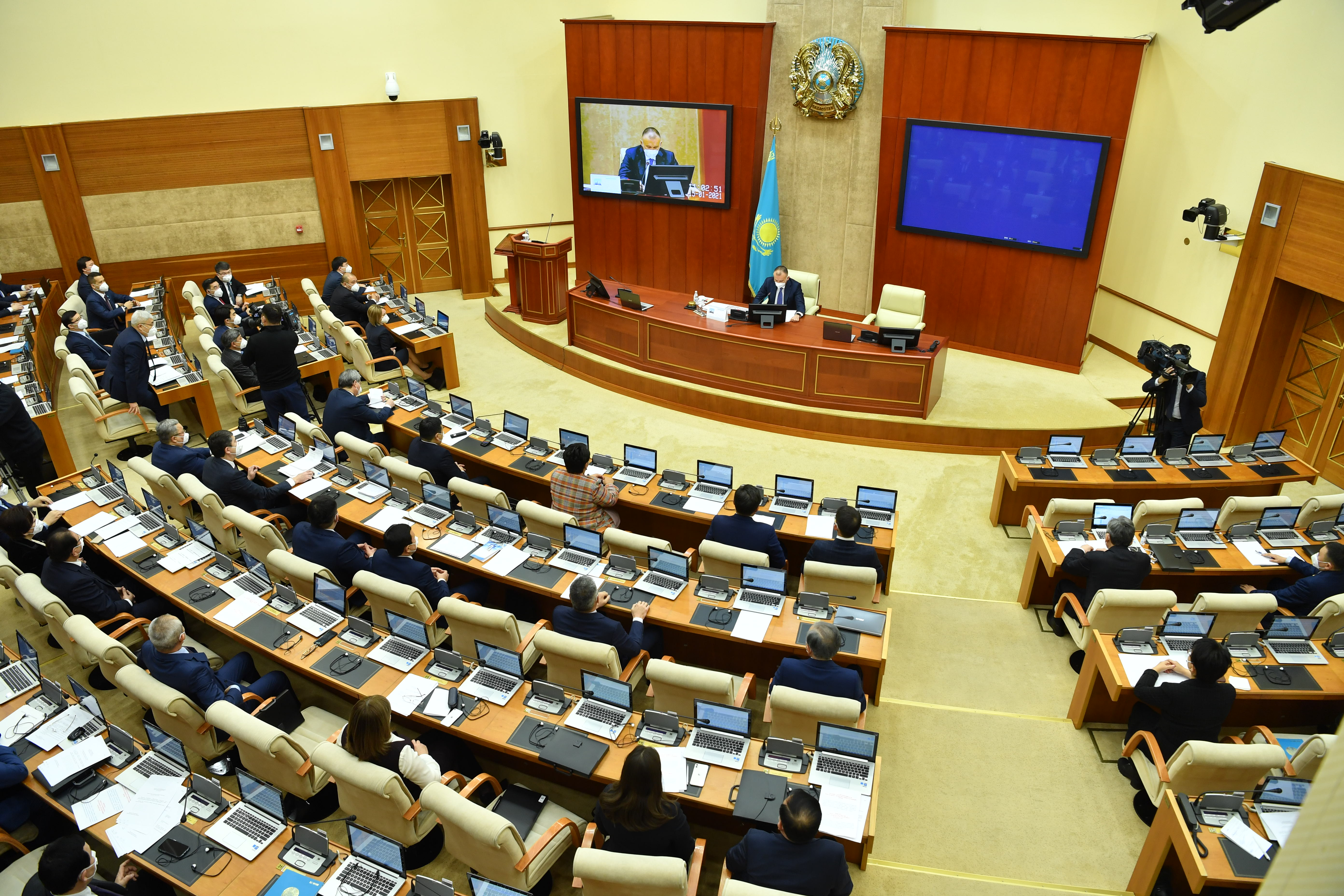
- Astana, Kazakhstan

Website
- www.parlam.kz/en/mazhilis

The Mäjılıs of the Parliament of the Republic of Kazakhstan, (Note: Kazakh: Қазақстан Республикасы Парламентінің Мәжілісі, romanized: Qazaqstan Respublikasy Parlamentınıñ Mäjılısı; Russian: Мажилис Парламента Республики Казахстан, romanized: Mažilis Parlamenta Respubliki Kazahstan) simply referred to as the Mäjılıs, (Note: Kazakh: Мәжіліс [mæʒɘ̆lɘ́s]; lit. 'Assembly' — from Arabic مجلس majlis) was the lower house of the Parliament of Kazakhstan, alongside the upper house Senate. Together, they formed the national bicameral legislature of Kazakhstan, responsible for enacting legislation. Established by the Constitution of Kazakhstan following the 1995 constitutional referendum, the Mäjılıs was first convened in 1996. The chamber played a role in the legislative process, debating and passing laws, where lawmakers discussed key issues facing the country and propose solutions to address them by representing the interests of constituents.

With a membership of 98 deputies, the chamber was led by a Mäjılıs chairman and convenes in the Parliament Building situated in the Kazakhstan's capital city of Astana. Deputies of Mäjılıs were directly elected to five-year terms, with the electoral process employing a mixed voting system, where 70% of the seats are distributed under party lists with a 5% election threshold, and the other 30% are allocated through first-past-the-post (FPTP) in 29 single-member constituencies.

Throughout its existence, the composition of the Mäjılıs had been shaped by varying electoral systems and legislative reforms. From 1995 to 1999, it operated under the FPTP system before transitioning to a mixed-member majoritarian representation from 1999 to 2007, which blended constituency-based and party-list systems. Subsequent 2007 amendments saw the adoption of a party-list proportional representation system from 2007 to 2023, fostering the consolidation of political parties and the emergence of Amanat as the party of power. Notably, the chamber reverted to a mixed electoral system following the 2022 constitutional referendum, integrating proportional representation and constituency-based voting.

Moreover, the Mäjılıs has encountered instances of early dissolution, which impacted the convocation terms of the Parliament and the governance of Kazakhstan. Over the years, the Mäjılıs gained significant authority, including the power to approve governmental appointments by the president.

== History ==
After the 1995 Kazakh constitutional referendum, held on 30 August 1995, which saw overwhelming approval by voters for a new draft of the Constitution of Kazakhstan, the country transitioned to bicameralism. This new structure included the establishment of the Mäjılıs, the lower house of Parliament. The first parliamentary elections under this framework were held in December 1995, with all seats in both houses contested. However, the initial vote was inconclusive in some instances, necessitating runoff elections to fill 23 seats in the Mäjılıs. These elections were marred by procedural violations, as reported by international observers. The newly formed parliament convened on 30 January 1996, and included a total of 99 members, with 68 Kazakh and 31 Russian representatives, as well as 10 female deputies.

In the wake of the 2004 elections, the Otan party emerged as the first political faction to secure a majority in the Mäjılıs. This majority was further strengthened following the 2006 merger of Otan with the Asar, Civic Party, and Agrarian Party, significantly increasing its seats in the legislative body.

A key turning point came with the constitutional amendments of 2007, which expanded the number of seats in the Mäjılıs from 77 to 107. For the first time, the 2007 parliamentary elections introduced a party-list proportional representation system, with 98 of the 107 seats being contested via proportional representation. The reforms solidified the position of Nur Otan (the renamed Otan party), which won all of the contested seats, effectively eliminating any serious opposition in the Mäjılıs.

Despite some minor opposition gains in subsequent years, the 2012 parliamentary elections saw the Aq Jol and the Communist People's Party of Kazakhstan entering the Mäjılıs. However, Nur Otan continued to maintain its party of power status, ensuring the party’s control over the legislative process.

Further electoral reforms were introduced with constitutional amendments in 2021 and 2022, which eliminated the nine seats previously reserved for the Assembly of People of Kazakhstan. Additionally, the electoral threshold for parties to gain representation in the Mäjılıs was lowered from 7% to 5%, and single-member constituencies were reintroduced, reshaping the way elections were conducted and increasing political representation at the local level. Despite these changes, Amanat continued to dominate the political landscape, reflecting the ongoing consolidation of power within the ruling party.

== Composition ==
The Mäjılıs is composed of 98 directly-elected members. Elections of Mäjılıs deputies are held every five years (unless a snap election is called earlier) and are elected through mixed-member majoritarian representation: 69 seats via closed party-list proportional representation with a required 5% electoral threshold to win seats (which are allocated according to the largest remainder method), and 29 seats via first-past-the-post in single-member constituencies. Since 2021, Article 89 of the Constitutional Law "On Elections" requires for parties to include at least 30% quota of women, young people (aged under 29), and disabled persons within their electoral lists.

=== Leadership ===
The Chairman of the Mäjılıs heads the lower chamber and is elected by the Mäjılıs deputies. The Mäjılıs chairman opens sessions, convenes regular joint sessions and chairs the regular and extraordinary joint sessions of the Parliament.

The Mäjılıs chairmen is assisted by two Deputy Chairpersons who nominates them and are elected by the deputies of the Mäjılıs. The Deputy Chairpersons of the Mäjılıs carry out tasks made by the chairman who take on certain responsibilities if he or she is not able to.

=== Members ===
The term of office of the Mäjılıs deputies is five years. Regular elections for Mäjılıs are held no later than two months before the end of the term of office of the current convocation of the Parliament. Snap elections of Mäjılıs deputies are held within two months from the date of the early termination of the powers of the Mazhilis.

A member of the Mäjılıs can be a person who has reached 25 years of age, is a citizen of Kazakhstan and has permanently resided in its territory for the last ten years.

Deprivation of a deputy of the Mäjılıs of the Parliament of the mandate may be made when:

- Withdrawal or expulsion of a deputy from a political party from which, in accordance with the constitutional law, he was elected
- Termination of the activity of a political party, from which, in accordance with the constitutional law, the deputy was elected

=== Committees ===
The Mäjılıs is composed of seven committees:

- Committee on Agrarian Issues
- Committee on Legislation and Judicial and Legal Reform
- Committee on Foreign Affairs, Defense and Security
- Committee on Social and Cultural Development
- Committee on Finance and Budget
- Committee on Issues of Ecology and Environmental Management
- Committee for Economic Reform and Regional Development

== Powers ==
According to the Constitution of Kazakhstan, the exclusive jurisdiction of the Mazhilis includes:

- Acceptance for consideration of draft constitutional laws submitted to the Parliament and consideration of these drafts;
- By a majority vote of the total number of deputies of the chamber, giving consent to the President for the appointment of the Prime Minister
- Announcement of the next presidential elections
- Exercise of other powers assigned by the Constitution
- The Mäjılıs, by a majority of votes from the total number of Mazhilis members, on the initiative of at least one fifth of the total number of the members, has the right to express a vote of no confidence in the Government.

== List of convocations ==
Mäjilis	Period	Election
1st	30 January 1996 – 1 December 1999	1995
2nd	1 December 1999 – 3 November 2004	1999
3rd	3 November 2004 – 20 June 2007	2004
4th	1 September 2007 – 15 November 2011	2007
5th	20 January 2012 – 20 January 2016	2012
6th	25 March 2016 – 30 December 2020	2016
7th	15 January 2021 – 19 January 2023	2021
8th	29 March 2023 – 1 July 2026	2023

== Historical composition ==
QKP / QSP / Peasants Union / QKF / "Harmony" / Asar / QHK / Others / Indep. / State list / QJO / QDP / QAP / QHBO / Otan / QAP / AIST / Aq Jol		Total seats
1994	8 / 4 / 11 / 4 / 9 / 1 / 64 / 42 / 1 / 33	177
1995	2 / 1 / 7 / 5 / 1 / 1 / 3 / 7 / 3 / 12 / 25	67
1999	3 / 11 / 1 / 23 / 13 / 23 / 3	77
2004	4 / 1 / 18 / 42 / 11 / 1	77

QKHP / QHP / JSDP / Auyl / Indep. / Elected by the Assembly of People / Nur Otan / Amanat / Respublica / Aq Jol		Total seats
2007	9 / 98	107
2012	7 / 9 / 83 / 8	107
2016	7 / 9 / 84 / 7	107
2021	10 / 9 / 76 / 12	107
2023	5 / 4 / 8 / 7 / 62 / 6 / 6	98

== See also ==
- Majlis, an Arabic term used for the name of many legislatures in the Muslim world
