= 7th Parliament of Kazakhstan =

Parliament of the Republic of Kazakhstan of the 7th convocation
←	6th Parliament of Kazakhstan	8th Parliament of Kazakhstan	→

Overview
- Legislative body: Parliament of Kazakhstan
- Meeting place: Parliament Building; Astana, Kazakhstan
- Term: 15 January 2021 – 19 January 2023
- Election: 10 January 2021
- Government: Mamin II; Smaiylov I
- Members: 50
- Chairman: Mäulen Äşimbaev
- Deputy Chairmen: Asqar Şäkirov; Nurlan Äbdirov; Olga Perepechina; Jaqyp Asanov
- Party control: Nonpartisan (40)
- Members: 107
- Chairman: Nurlan Nigmatulin
- Deputy Chairmen: Pavel Kazantsev; Balaim Kesebaeva
- Party control: Amanat (76)

Sessions
- 1st: 15 January 2021 – 30 June 2021
- 2nd: 1 September 2021 – 30 June 2022
- 3rd: 1 September 2022 – 28 March 2023

The Parliament of the Republic of Kazakhstan of the 7th convocation (Kazakh: Жетінші шақырылған Қазақстан Республикасы Парламенті, romanized: Jetınşı şaqyrylğan Qazaqstan Respublikasy Parlamentı; Russian: Парламент Республики Казахстан седьмого созыва) was a convocation of the Parliament of Kazakhstan from 2021 to 2023.

The term convened at its first session on 15 January, following the 2021 legislative election to the lower house Mäjilis, previously held on 10 January. A total of 98 deputies of the Mäjilis were elected based on the party-list proportional representation, while the 9 seats were reserved to the members elected by the Assembly of People on 11 January. Nurlan Nigmatulin, the parliamentary leader of the Nur Otan party group, was unanimously elected as the chairman of the Mäjilis while Balaim Kesebaeva and Pavel Kazantsev were elected as deputy chairmen. For the first time, the Mäjilis was responsible for the formation of the government following the 2017 amendment which saw the parliamentary approval of PM Asqar Mamin.

The 7th Kazakh Parliament functioned before being dissolved in January 2023 by President Kassym-Jomart Tokayev ahead of the 2023 legislative election, making it one of the shortest-lived convocation in Kazakhstan's legislative history.

== 7th Mäjilis ==
=== Leadership ===
Office	MP	Term	Party
Chairman	Nurlan Nigmatulin	15 January 2021 — 1 February 2022	Amanat
Chairman	Erlan Qoşanov	1 February 2022 — 19 January 2023	Amanat
Deputy Chairmen	Pavel Kazantsev	15 January 2021 — 19 January 2023	Amanat
Deputy Chairmen	Balaim Kesebaeva	15 January 2021 — 19 January 2023	Amanat
Faction leaders	Nurlan Nigmatulin	15 January 2021 — 1 February 2022	Amanat
Faction leaders	Erlan Qoşanov	14 February 2022 — 19 January 2023	Amanat
Faction leaders	Azat Peruashev	15 January 2021 — 19 January 2023	Aq Jol
Faction leaders	Aiqyn Qongyrov	15 January 2021 — 19 January 2023	QHP

=== Committees ===
Type	Chairman	Party	Period
On Agrarian Issues	Erlan Barlybaev	Aq Jol	15 January 2021 – 19 January 2023
On Finance and Budget	Marat Qūsaıynov	Amanat	15 January 2021 – 19 January 2023
On Ecology and Nature Management	Aleksandr Miliutin	QHP	15 January 2021 – 19 January 2023
On Economic Reform and Regional Development	Albert Rau	Amanat	15 January 2021 – 19 January 2023
On International Affairs, Defense and Security	Aigül Qūspan	Amanat	15 January 2021 – 19 January 2023
On Legislation and Judicial and Legal Reform	Qanat Musın	Amanat	15 January 2021 – 14 June 2021
On Legislation and Judicial and Legal Reform	Arman Qojahmetov	Amanat	16 June 2021 – 19 January 2023
On Social and Cultural Development	Djamılia Nūrmanbetova	Amanat	15 January 2021 – 19 January 2023

== 7th Senate ==
The legislature of Senate of Kazakhstan the 7th convocation began with the opening of its first session on 15 January 2021 with the senators elected in 2017, 2020 and were appointed by President of Kazakhstan in 2017, 2019, and 2020 continued their terms.

=== Leadership ===
Office	MP	Term
Chairman	Mäulen Äşimbaev	15 January 2021 — 28 March 2023
Deputy Chairman	Asqar Şäkirov	15 January 2021 — 24 January 2023
Deputy Chairman	Jaqyp Asanov	26 January 2023 — 28 March 2023
Deputy Chairman	Nurlan Äbdirov	15 January 2021 — 25 January 2022
Deputy Chairman	Olga Perepechina	27 January 2022 — 28 March 2023

== Major legislation ==
- 15 January 2021: Opening session of the 8th Parliament of Kazakhstan; Asqar Mamin approved as Prime Minister of Kazakhstan with 78 votes in favor.
- 15 September 2021: Adoption of the law "On introducing amendments and additions to some legislative acts of the Republic of Kazakhstan on issues of protecting the rights of the child, education, information and informatization".
- 27 October 2021: Adoption of the law on stricter penalties for animal cruelty.
- 11 January 2022: Älihan Smaiylov approved as Prime Minister of Kazakhstan with 89 votes in favor.
- 2 February 2022: Adoption of amendments to the constitutional laws "The First President of the Republic of Kazakhstan - Elbasy", "On the Assembly of the People of Kazakhstan", and "On the Security Council of the Republic of Kazakhstan", abolishing the lifelong chairmanship of first president Nursultan Nazarbayev in the Security Council and the Assembly of People.
- 4 May 2022: Approved amendments to the Constitution of Kazakhstan.
- 16 September 2022: Approved amendments to the Constitution of Kazakhstan, changing the president's renewable five-year to single seven-year term and renaming the capital of Nur-Sultan back to Astana.
- 13 January 2023: Adoption of the law "On invalidating the Constitutional Law of the Republic of Kazakhstan “On the First President of the Republic of Kazakhstan - Elbasy", with 92 votes in favor.
