= 8th Parliament of Kazakhstan =

Final parliament of Kazakhstan (2023-2026)

Parliament of the Republic of Kazakhstan of the 8th convocation
←	7th Parliament of Kazakhstan	1st Kurultai	→

Overview
- Legislative body: Parliament of Kazakhstan
- Meeting place: Parliament Building; Astana, Kazakhstan
- Term: 29 March 2023 – 1 July 2026
- Election: 19 March 2023
- Government: Smaiylov II; Bektenov

Mäjilis
- Members: 98
- Chairman: Älihan Smaiylov
- Deputy Chairmen: Dania Espaeva; Albert Rau
- Party control: Amanat (76)

Senate
- Members: 55
- Chairman: Mäulen Äşimbaev
- Deputy Chairmen: Olga Perepechina; Jaqyp Asanov

Sessions
- 1st: 29 March 2023 – 30 June 2023
- 2nd: 1 September 2023 – 1 July 2026

The Parliament of the Republic of Kazakhstan of the 8th convocation (Kazakh: Сегізінші шақырылған Қазақстан Республикасы Парламенті, romanized: Segızınşı şaqyrylğan Qazaqstan Respublikasy Parlamentı; Russian: Парламент Республики Казахстан восьмого созыва) was the last convocation of the Parliament of Kazakhstan.

Following the 2023 legislative election to the lower house Mäjilis, where the composition of the parliament was determined through mixed-member majoritarian representation for the first time since 2004, a total of 98 Mäjilis deputies were elected with 69 from party-list proportional representation and 29 representing the newly reestablished single-mandate territorial constituencies. Since the 3rd Mäjilis, more than three parties had managed to overcome the 5% electoral threshold, leading to the Mäjilis consisting of six parties forming their own factions.

The 8th Parliament of Kazakhstan was first convened in its plenary session on 29 March 2023, under a presidential decree briefly signed by Kassym-Jomart Tokayev.

== 8th Mäjilis ==
=== Leadership ===
The leadership consisted of the Bureau of the Mäjilis, a coordinating body formed under the Chairman of the Mäjilis. The bureau includes deputy chairmen, chairmen of the standing committees, as well as heads of parliamentary factions of political parties represented in the Mäjilis.

The first plenary session of the new Mäjilis convocation is opened and chaired by the chairman of the Central Election Commission (Nurlan Äbdirov) until a Mäjilis Chairman is elected, who opens, conducts and closes plenary sessions of the chamber. The chairman of Mäjilis is accompanied by deputy chairmen who perform his or her individual functions.

Office	MP	Period	Parliamentary affiliation
Chairman	Erlan Qoşanov	Since 29 March 2023	Amanat
Deputy Chairmen	Dania Espaeva	Since 29 March 2023	Aq Jol
Deputy Chairmen	Albert Rau	Since 29 March 2023	Amanat
Faction leaders	Elnur Beisembaev	29 March 2023 — 11 February 2026	Amanat
Faction leaders	Aidos Sarym	Since 11 February 2026	Amanat
Faction leaders	Anas Baqqojaev	29 March 2023 — October 2023	Auyl
Faction leaders	Serik Egizbaev	Since October 2023	Auyl
Faction leaders	Aidarbek Qojanazarov	Since 29 March 2023	Respublica
Faction leaders	Azat Peruaşev	Since 29 March 2023	Aq Jol
Faction leaders	Magerram Magerramov	Since 29 March 2023	QHP
Faction leaders	Ashat Raqymjanov	Since 29 March 2023	JSDP

=== Chairmanship election ===
Erlan Qoşanov's chairmanship was endorsed by Amanat deputy Baktykozha Izmukhambetov during the opening convocation of the 8th Mäjilis. His candidature was unimously supported by all factions, thus making running uncontested to the post. In a subsequent parliamentary vote, Qoşanov was officially re-elected as the chairman of Mäjilis from all present 98 votes.

Candidate	Votes	%
√ Erlan Qoşanov (Amanat)	98	100.0%

=== Factions ===
Six parties managed to overcome the 5% electoral threshold, thus being able to form their own factions. Seven independents elected from single-member districts (including two deputies affiliated with Amanat) served as part of unaffiliated caucus.

Faction	Seats
Amanat	62
Auyl	8
Respublica	6
Aq Jol	6
People's Party of Kazakhstan	5
Nationwide Social Democratic Party	4
Unaffiliated	7

=== Committees ===
The formation of committees and their leaderships were determined by the newly elected deputies during the first meeting in the first plenary session of the 8th Mäjilis on 29 March 2023.

Committee issues	Chair	Parties
On Agrarian Issues	Serik Egizbaev	Amanat (6)
On Agrarian Issues	Serik Egizbaev	Auyl (1)
On Agrarian Issues	Serik Egizbaev	Respublica (1)
On Agrarian Issues	Serik Egizbaev	QHP (1)
On Agrarian Issues	Serik Egizbaev	Unaffiliated (1)
On Legislation and Judicial and Legal Reform	Snezhana Imasheva	Amanat (8)
On Legislation and Judicial and Legal Reform	Snezhana Imasheva	Auyl (1)
On Legislation and Judicial and Legal Reform	Snezhana Imasheva	Respublica (1)
On Legislation and Judicial and Legal Reform	Snezhana Imasheva	Aq Jol (1)
On Legislation and Judicial and Legal Reform	Snezhana Imasheva	QHP (1)
On Legislation and Judicial and Legal Reform	Snezhana Imasheva	Unaffiliated (2)
On Foreign Affairs, Defence and Security	Aigül Quspan	Amanat (8)
On Foreign Affairs, Defence and Security	Aigül Quspan	Auyl (1)
On Foreign Affairs, Defence and Security	Aigül Quspan	Respublica (1)
On Foreign Affairs, Defence and Security	Aigül Quspan	JSDP (1)
On Foreign Affairs, Defence and Security	Aigül Quspan	Unaffiliated (2)
On Social and Cultural Development	Ashat Aimagambetov	Amanat (10)
On Social and Cultural Development	Ashat Aimagambetov	Auyl (1)
On Social and Cultural Development	Ashat Aimagambetov	Respublica (1)
On Social and Cultural Development	Ashat Aimagambetov	Aq Jol (1)
On Social and Cultural Development	Ashat Aimagambetov	QHP (1)
On Social and Cultural Development	Ashat Aimagambetov	JSDP (1)
On Social and Cultural Development	Ashat Aimagambetov	Unaffiliated (2)
On Finance and Budget	Mädi Takiev (until 6 February 2024)	Amanat (10)
On Finance and Budget	Mädi Takiev (until 6 February 2024)	Auyl (1)
On Finance and Budget	Mädi Takiev (until 6 February 2024)	Respublica (1)
On Finance and Budget	Tatyana Savelyeva (since 14 February 2024)	Aq Jol (1)
On Finance and Budget	Tatyana Savelyeva (since 14 February 2024)	JSDP (1)
On Finance and Budget	Tatyana Savelyeva (since 14 February 2024)	Unaffiliated (1)
On Issues of Ecology and Environmental Management	Edil Jañbyrşyn	Amanat (5)
On Issues of Ecology and Environmental Management	Edil Jañbyrşyn	Auyl (1)
On Issues of Ecology and Environmental Management	Edil Jañbyrşyn	Aq Jol (1)
On Issues of Ecology and Environmental Management	Edil Jañbyrşyn	QHP (1)
On Issues of Ecology and Environmental Management	Edil Jañbyrşyn	JSDP (1)
On Economic Reform and Regional Development	Nurtai Sabilianov	Amanat (12)
On Economic Reform and Regional Development	Nurtai Sabilianov	Auyl (1)
On Economic Reform and Regional Development	Nurtai Sabilianov	Respublica (1)
On Economic Reform and Regional Development	Nurtai Sabilianov	Aq Jol (1)

=== Members ===
The newly-elected 8th Mäjilis composition included 80 men (81.6%) and 18 women (18.4%). The average age of a member is 48 years old (as of March 2023). Under 35 years old – 12 members; from 35 to 59 years old – 69 members; over 60 years – 17 members. The 8th Mäjilis also included 34 members from previous convocations. Overall, the members represent various fields of activity: civil service, business, non-governmental organizations, education, medicine, etc. The national composition of the 8th Mäjilis is represented by various ethnic groups including Kazakhs, Russians, Germans, Belarusians, and Azerbaijanis.

== 8th Senate ==
=== Leadership ===
Much like its lower house Mäjilis counterpart, the leadership consists of the Bureau of the Senate, a coordinating body formed under the Chairman of the Senate of Kazakhstan. The Bureau includes deputy chairmen and chairmen of the standing committees of the Senate.

The Senate chairman is elected from among the Senate deputies by secret ballot during a Senate meeting in a majority vote. Nominated by the President, the Senate chairman manages Senate sessions, oversees issue preparation, and presents candidates for various positions. They also ensure compliance with Senate rules, coordinate Senate activities, and appoint judges and members of key commissions. The Senate chairman is supported by deputy chairmen who, on their behalf, fulfill their individual duties and handle assigned tasks.

Office	MP	Term
Chairman	Mäulen Äşimbaev	29 March 2023 —
Deputy Chairman	Olga Perepechina	29 March 2023 —
Deputy Chairman	Jaqyp Asanov	29 March 2023 —

=== Parliamentary groups ===
Parliamentary group	Members	Chairman	Period
Öñir	19	Serik Şaidarov	Since 6 April 2023
Bir el - bir müdde	10	Nurtöre Jüsip	Since 12 June 2023
Unaffiliated	26		

=== Members ===
The 8th Senate term commenced with its first session on 29 March 2023. Members consisted of senators elected in 2020 and 2023, alongside those appointed by the President of Kazakhstan in 2022 and 2023, all continuing their terms.
