= Deputy Chairman of the Senate of Kazakhstan =

- Қазақстан Сенаты төрағасының орынбасары (Kazakh); заместитель председателя Сената Казахстана (Russian)
- Nominator: Chair of the Senate of Kazakhstan
- Appointer: Senate of Kazakhstan
- Term length: None
- Inaugural holder: Sergey Tikhonov
- Formation: 30 January 1996
- Final holder: Olga Perepechina; Jaqyp Asanov
- Abolished: 1 July 2026
- Superseded by: Deputy Chairman of the Kurultai
- Website: senate.parlam.kz

The Deputy Chairman of the Senate of the Republic of Kazakhstan (Note: Kazakh: Қазақстан Республикасы Сенаты төрағасының орынбасары; Qazaqstan Respublikasy Senaty törağasynyñ orynbasary; IPA: [qɑzɑɣ(ɯ)sˈtʰɑn rʲɪˈspublʲɪkäˈsɯ sʲɪnaˈtʰɯ tʰøræ.ɣɑsɯˈnɯŋ (w)ɔrɯnbɑsɑˈrɯ]; Russian: Заместитель Председателя Сената Республики Казахстан; Zamestitel Predsedatelya Senata Respubliki Kazakhstan; IPA: [zəmʲɪˈsʲtʲitʲɪlʲ prʲɪt͡sʲsʲɪˈdatʲɪlʲə sʲɪˈnatə rʲɪˈspublʲɪkʲɪ kɐzɐxˈstan]) was a post in the upper house of the Parliament, which is the Senate of Kazakhstan. The Deputy Chairman was nominated by the Chairman of the Senate of Kazakhstan who were then elected by the deputies of the Senate. The position was abolished on 1 July 2026 following the adoption of a new constitution that abolished the bicameral parliament and established a unicameral Kurultai.

The post was established on 30 January 1996 and since the constitutional amendments in May 2007, the office has been occupied by two people at the same time. The Deputy Chairman carried out tasks made by Senate Chair and responsibilities if the chairman wasn't able to fulfill them.

The Deputy Chairman could be dismissed by the senators only with the proposal by the Chairman.

== List of Deputy Chairmen ==
Convocation	Name	Took office	Left office	Senate Chair
1st (1996–1999)	Sergey Tikhonov	30 January 1996	15 May 1998	Omirbek Baigeldi
1st (1996–1999)	Aitkul Samaqova	15 May 1998	10 March 1999	Omirbek Baigeldi
1st (1996–1999)	Äbilgazy Qusaiynov	10 March 1999	1 December 1999	Omirbek Baigeldi
2nd (1999–2004)	Omirbek Baigeldi	1 December 1999	1 December 2005	Oralbay Abdykarimov
2nd (1999–2004)	Omirbek Baigeldi	1 December 1999	1 December 2005	Nurtai Abykayev
3rd (2004–2007)	Muhambet Kopeev	1 December 2005	24 November 2011	Nurtai Abykayev
3rd (2004–2007)	Muhambet Kopeev	1 December 2005	24 November 2011	Kassym-Jomart Tokayev
4th (2007–2012)	Muhambet Kopeev	1 December 2005	24 November 2011	Kassym-Jomart Tokayev
4th (2007–2012)	Aleksandr Sudin	3 September 2007	26 August 2013	Kassym-Jomart Tokayev
4th (2007–2012)	Qairat Işçanov	24 November 2011	14 January 2016	Kairat Mami
5th (2012–2016)	Sergey Gromov	3 September 2013	16 September 2016	Kairat Mami
5th (2012–2016)	Asqar Beisenbaev	14 January 2016	12 August 2019	Kassym-Jomart Tokayev
6th (2016–2021)	Asqar Beisenbaev	14 January 2016	12 August 2019	Kassym-Jomart Tokayev
6th (2016–2021)	Bektas Beknazarov	16 September 2016	28 August 2020	Kassym-Jomart Tokayev
6th (2016–2021)	Asqar Şäkirov	2 September 2019	24 January 2023	Dariga Nazarbayeva
6th (2016–2021)	Nurlan Äbdirov	1 September 2020	25 January 2022	Mäulen Äşimbaev
7th (2022–2026)	Olga Perepechina	27 January 2022	1 July 2026	Mäulen Äşimbaev
7th (2022–2026)	Jaqyp Asanov	26 January 2023	1 July 2026	Mäulen Äşimbaev
