= 2002 Kazakh Senate election =

- 8 October 2002

16 of the 39 seats in the Senate of Kazakhstan
- Turnout: 95.43%
	First party
Leader	Oralbay Abdykarimov
Party	Nonpartisan
Leader since	1 December 1999
Last election	16
Seats won	16
Seat change	Steady
Percentage	100%
Chair before election
Nurtai Abykayev
Nonpartisan
Elected Chair
Nurtai Abykayev
Nonpartisan

Senate elections were held in Kazakhstan on 8 October 2002. All the 16 represented seats in the Senate were elected by 3304 out of 3153 mäslihat members.

== Electoral system ==
The members of the Senate of Kazakhstan are nonpartisan and are indirectly elected by the local legislative bodies Maslihats every six years. Each region and cities of Almaty and Astana are represented by two senators while 7 senators are appointed by the President of Kazakhstan.

== Senators elected ==
Region	Senator
Akmola	Marat Qoyshybayev
Aktobe	Eleusin Saghyndyqov
Almaty	Zhomartqaliy Zheksenbinov
Almaty City	Zhumabek Toregeldinov
Astana City	Farid Galimov
Atyrau	Zhandarbek Kakishev
East Kazakhstan	Alexander Gusinskii
Jambyl	Shamsat Isabekov
Karaganda	Yurii Kubaychuk
Kostanay	Beksultan Tutqyshev
Kyzylorda	Ongalbek Sapiev
Mangystau	Leonid Burlakov
North Kazakhstan	Anatolii Bashmakov
Pavlodar	Ermek Zhumabayev
South Kazakhstan	Orynbay Rakhmanberdiev
West Kazakhstan	Qabdyghaliy Akhmetov
