= 2008 Kazakh Senate election =

2008 Kazakh Senate elections
- 4 October 2008

16 of the 47 seats in the Senate
- Turnout: 97.61%
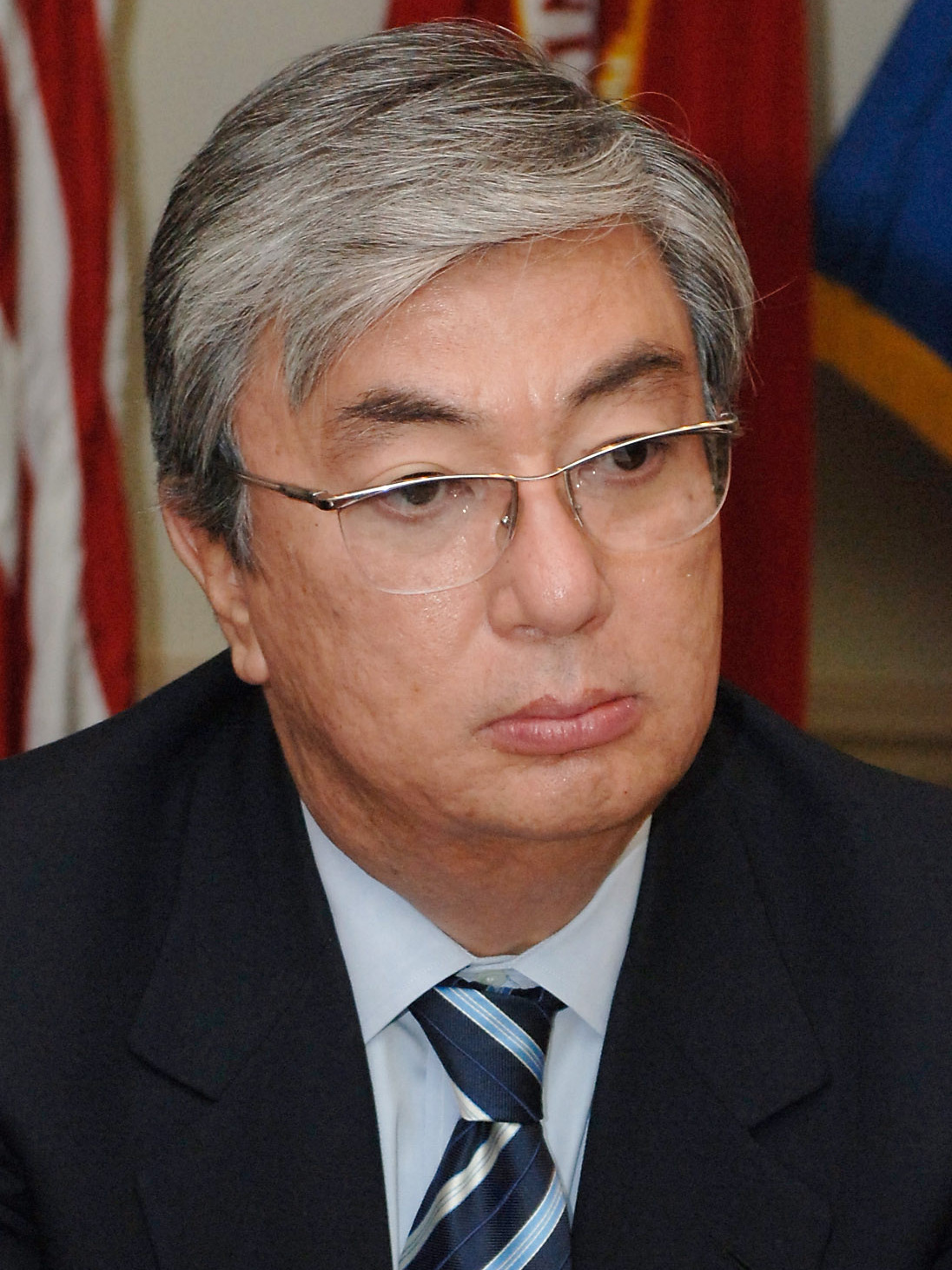
	First party
Leader	Kassym-Jomart Tokayev
Party	Nonpartisan
Leader since	11 January 2007
Last election	16
Seats won	16
Seat change	Steady
Percentage	100%
Chair before election
Kassym-Jomart Tokayev
Nonpartisan
Elected Chair
Kassym-Jomart Tokayev
Nonpartisan

Senate elections were held in Kazakhstan on 4 October 2008. All 16 seats representing the regions of Kazakhstan were elected by the local legislative bodies (maslihats). 3310 of the 3231 eligible electorates voted in the election.

== Electoral system ==
The members of the Senate of Kazakhstan are nonpartisan and are indirectly elected by the local legislative bodies Maslihats every six years. Each region and cities of Almaty and Astana are represented by two senators while 15 senators are appointed by the President of Kazakhstan.
