= Sergey Tikhonov =

Kazakh politician

MP Sergey Tikhonov
- Сергей Тихонов

Deputy Chairman of the Senate of Kazakhstan
- In office 30 January 1996 – 15 May 1998
- Chairman: Omirbek Baigeldi
- Preceded by: Office established
- Succeeded by: Aitkul Samakova

Member of the Senate of Kazakhstan
- In office 1996 – 15 May 1998
- Appointed by: Nursultan Nazarbayev

Deputy Minister of Justice
- In office 1994–1996
- President: Nursultan Nazarbayev
- Prime Minister: Akejan Kajegeldin
- Minister: Konstantin Kolpakov

Personal details
- Education: Omsk State University (1979)
- Occupation: Lawyer; politician

Sergey Viktorovich Tikhonov (Russian: Сергей Викторович Тихонов) is a Kazakh lawyer and former politician who served as the first Deputy Chairman of the Senate of Kazakhstan from 1996 to 1998.

== Early life and education ==
Tikhonov finished his studies in jurispudence at Omsk State University in 1979. He is a candidate of the judicial sciences.

== Career ==
In 1972, Tikhonov was allowed to exercise law.

In 1991, he became the head of the Legislation Department of the Presidential Administration of Kazakhstan. Later, in 1994, he became Deputy Minister of Justice.

From 30 January 1996 to 15 May 1998, Tikhonov served as the Deputy Chairman of the Senate of Kazakhstan under Chairman Omirbek Baigeldi. In this position and as Senator, he participated in the creation of the 1993 and 1995 Constitutions of Kazakhstan, among other major legislative projects.

From 1998, he worked as a lawyer and taught at KAZGUU University.

== Personal life ==
Tikhonov speaks Russian and German.

In November 2019, Tikhonov pleaded President Kassym-Jomart Tokayev to personally overlook the criminal prosecution of his attorney son Viktor, who was the former head of the Almaty city prosecutor's office. He believed the arrest and trial of Viktor to be biased and wrongful. He also mentioned that Viktor had 4 children. In September 2022, Viktor was acquitted.
