= Sergey Gromov =

Kazakh politician

- Сергей Громов
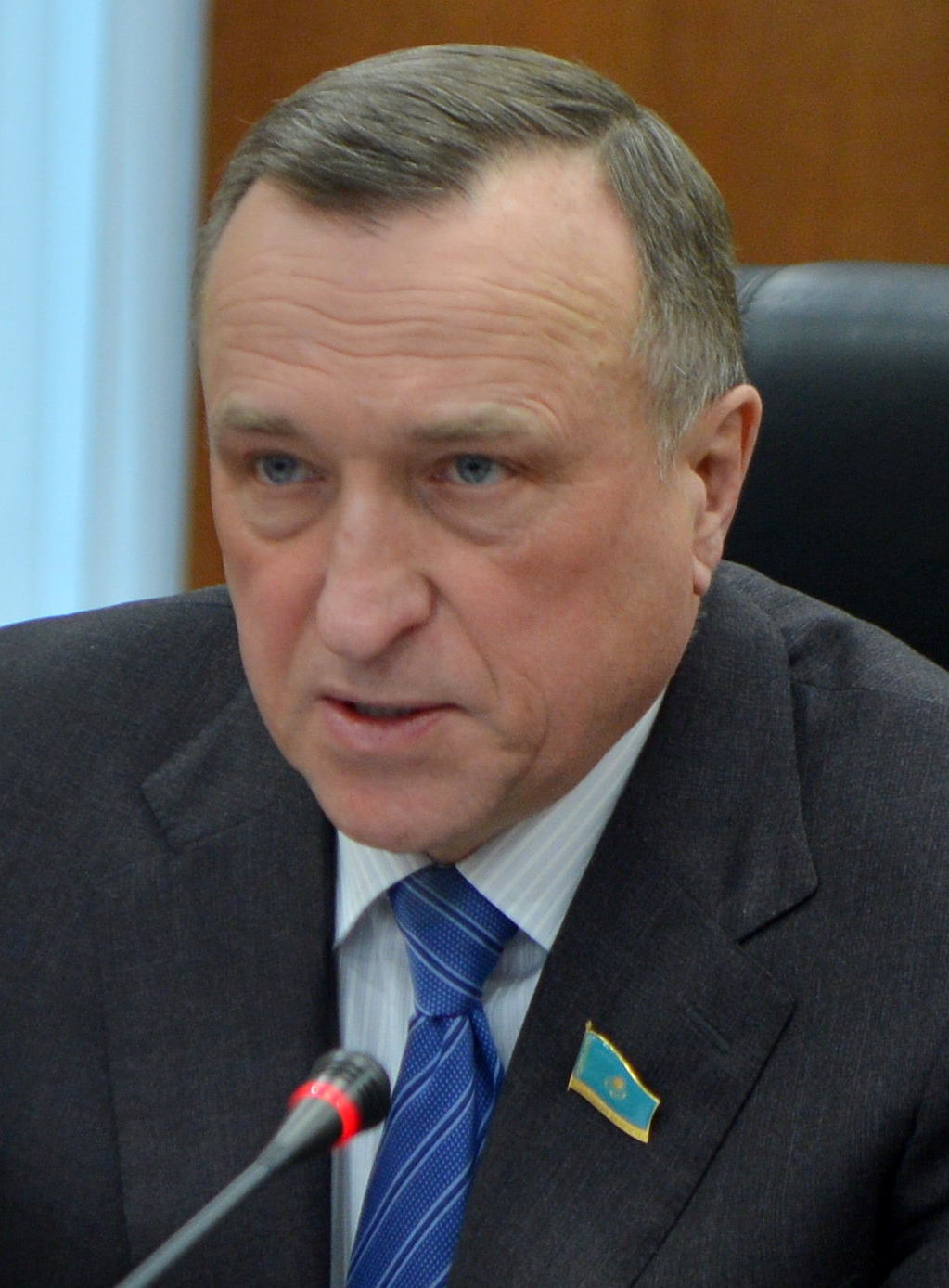
- Gromov in 2018

Deputy Chairman of the Senate
- In office 14 January 2016 – 12 August 2019 Serving with Asqar Beisenbaev, Bektas Beknazarov
- Chairman: Kassym-Jomart Tokayev; Dariga Nazarbayeva
- Preceded by: Qairat Işçanov
- Succeeded by: Asqar Şäkirov

Member of the Senate
- In office 26 August 2013 – 12 August 2019
- Appointed by: Nursultan Nazarbayev

Personal details
- Born: 6 January 1959 (age 67) Aksu, Kazakh SSR, Soviet Union
- Party: Nur Otan
- Children: Lyudmila, Sergey
- Education: Dulaty University; Almaty Institute of Political Science and Management; Aulie-Ata University

Sergey Nikolayevich Gromov (Russian: Сергей Николаевич Громов; born 6 January 1959) is a Kazakh politician who served as a Deputy Chairman of the Senate of Kazakhstan from January 2016 to August 2019.

== Biography ==
=== Early life and education ===
Gromov was born in the village of Aksu in Almaty Region. In 1981, he graduated from the Dulaty University in Taraz with a degree in hydraulic engineering, then Almaty Institute of Political Science and Management in 1991 with a degree in political science and Aulie-Ata University in 2002 with a degree in law.

=== Career ===
From 1981, Gromov was the assistant, teacher, and Secretary of the Komsomol Committee of the Dzhambul Irrigation and Drainage and Construction Institute and then from 1983 as Head of Department of the Dzhambul Regional Committee, First Secretary of the Dzhuvalinsky District Committee of the Lenin Communist Youth Union of Kazakhstan. In 1985, he became the Secretary of the Party Committee on State Farm until 1987, when he became the Second Secretary of the Lugovsk District Party Committee.

In 1991, Gromov became the Head of the Department of Foreign Economic Relations of AIC Krymskiy (Krasnodar Territory). From 1992, he worked as a General Director for production of the company Agrarian Technologies of Russia in Moscow. From 1993 to 1998, Gromov was the First Deputy General Director of JSC Altros and General Director of Altros-Agro (Krasnodar Territory), then from 1996 was the Director of the Representative Office of the firm Soyuz-Munay in the Jambyl Region and senior investment manager of the firm FESA Int,.

In 1998, Gromov was appointed as Äkim of the MerkI District. In May 2001, he became the First Deputy Äkim of the South Kazakhstan Region.

From January to June 2003, he served as the Director of the Department of Industry, Trade and Small Business Support for the South Kazakhstan Region until being appointed as the State Inspector of the Organizational Department of the Presidential Administration of Kazakhstan. In April 2004, Gromov became the State Inspector of the Department of Organizational Control Work and Personnel Policy.

On 16 February 2007, Gromov became the Head of the Central Office of Nur Otan. On 4 July 2007, he was elected as a Deputy Chairman of Nur Otan and served the post until November 2008, when he became the Secretary of the party. In September 2011, Gromov was appointed as a Deputy Minister of Defense.

On 26 August 2013, he was appointed as a member of the Senate of Kazakhstan where he from 14 January 2016 served as a Deputy Chair until being relieved on 12 August 2019. Shortly after on 14 August 2019, Gromov was appointed as a Vice Minister of Ecology, Geology and Natural Resources of Kazakhstan.
