= Bektas Beknazarov =

Kazakh politician

- Бектас Бекназаров
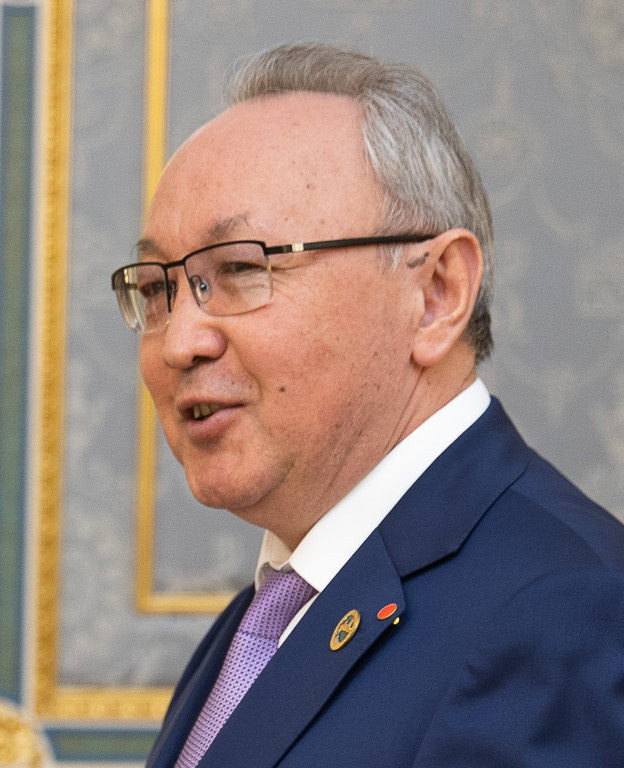
- Beknazarov in 2019

Deputy Chairman of the Senate
- In office 16 September 2016 – 28 August 2020 Serving with Sergey Gromov; Asqar Şäkirov
- Chairman: Kassym-Jomart Tokayev; Dariga Nazarbayeva; Mäulen Äşimbaev
- Preceded by: Asqar Beisenbaev
- Succeeded by: Nurlan Äbdirov

Member of the Senate
- In office 11 August 2014 – 28 August 2020
- Appointed by: Nursultan Nazarbayev

6th Chairman of the Supreme Court of Kazakhstan
- In office 15 April 2011 – 16 October 2013
- Preceded by: Musabek Alimbekov
- Succeeded by: Kairat Mami

Personal details
- Born: 12 September 1956 (age 69) Tesiktas, Kazakh SSR, Soviet Union
- Party: Nur Otan

Bektas Äbdıhanūly Beknazarov (Kazakh: Бектас Әбдіханұлы Бекназаров) is a Kazakh politician who served as Deputy Chair of the Senate of Kazakhstan from September 2016 to August 2020, and the 6th Chairman of the Supreme Court of Kazakhstan from April 2011 to October 2013.
