= Omirbek Baigeldi =

Kazakh politician, chair of the Senate (1939–2024)

Ömirbek Bäigeldi
- Өмірбек Бәйгелді

1st Chairman of the Senate
- In office 30 January 1996 – 29 November 1999
- Deputy: Sergey Tikhonov; Aitkul Samaqova; Äbilgazy Qusaiynov
- Preceded by: Office established
- Succeeded by: Oralbay Abdykarimov

Deputy Chairman of the Senate
- In office 1 December 1999 – 1 December 2005
- Chairman: Oralbay Abdykarimov; Nurtai Abykayev
- Preceded by: Äbilgazy Qusaiynov
- Succeeded by: Muhammed Kopeev

Senator for Jambyl Region
- In office 5 December 1995 – 19 August 2011 Serving with Jandar Karibaiuly, Shamsat Isabekov, Aleksandr Savchenko
- Preceded by: Office established
- Succeeded by: Ertargyn Astaev

Head of Jambyl Region
- In office 12 February 1992 – 6 October 1995
- Preceded by: Office established
- Succeeded by: Amalbek Tyshanov

Personal details
- Born: 15 April 1939 Ernazar, Kazakh SSR, Soviet Union
- Died: 3 April 2024 (aged 84) Astana, Kazakhstan
- Party: CPSU (1965–1991)
- Spouse: Mansia Süyingaliyeva
- Children: 3
- Education: Kazakh National Agrarian University; Academy of Sciences of the Soviet Union

Ömırbek Bäigeldı (Kazakh: Өмірбек Бәйгелді, [œmɘrˈbʲekʰ bæjɡʲeldɘ]; 15 April 1939 – 3 April 2024) was a Kazakh politician who was a member of the Senate of Kazakhstan where he served as the Chair from 30 January 1996 to 29 November 1999 and then its Deputy Chair from 1 December 1999 to 1 December 2005. Baigeldi had earlier been the Akim of the Jambyl Region from 1992 to 1995.

== Biography ==
=== Early life and education ===
Baigeldi was born in the village of Ernazar in Jambyl Region. In 1962, he graduated from the Kazakh National Agrarian University as livestock scientist. In 1982, Baigeldi earned his political science degree from the Academy of Sciences of the Soviet Union.

=== Career ===
After graduating in 1962, he was engaged in scientific and practical activities in the field of organization and management of agriculture and industry where he published a collection of articles and reports. From 1975 to 1990, Baigeldi was the head of the Regional Committee Department, First Secretary of the Kordai District Party Committee, chairman of the executive committee of the Jambyl Regional Council of People's Deputies, and the First Secretary of the Jambyl Regional Committee of the QKP.

On 12 February 1992, Baigeldi was appointed the Head of Jambyl Region. Shortly after he became the advisor to the President of Kazakhstan in October 1995. On 5 December 1995, Baigeldi was elected as a Senator from Jambyl Region and was chosen as its Chair on 30 January 1996. From 1 December 1999, he served as Deputy Chair of the Senate until he was replaced by Muhambet Kopeev on 1 December 2005. Baigeldi continued serving as a Senator until August 2011.

=== Death ===
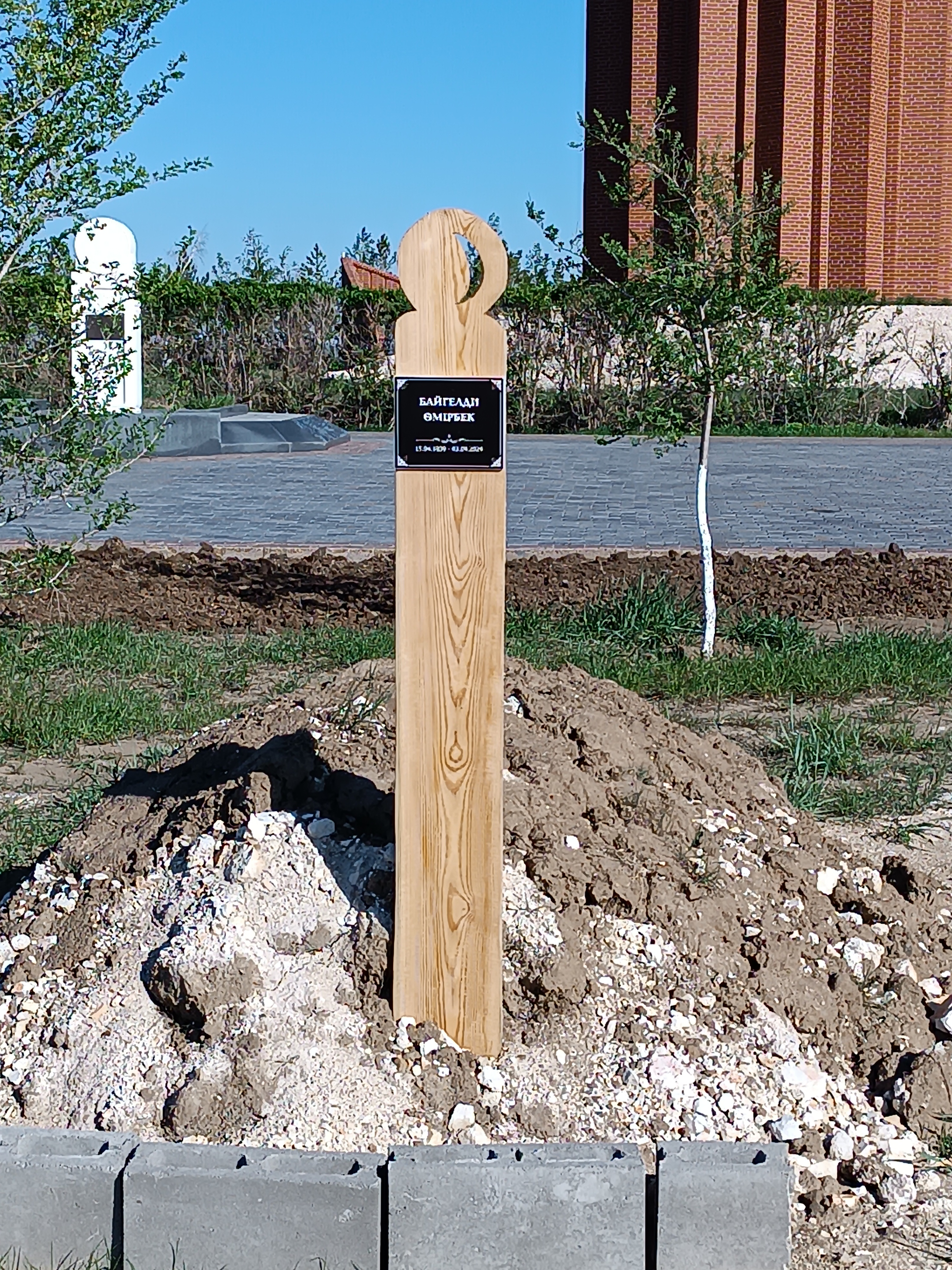
Baigeldi's gravestone at the National Pantheon of Kazakhstan

Omirbek Baigeldi died on 3 April 2024, at the age of 84. He is buried at the National Pantheon of Kazakhstan.

== Awards ==
Honor of the Republic of Uzbekistan (May 26, 1994, Uzbekistan) — for selfless work and high professional skills, manifested in the preparation and holding of days of the Republic of Kazakhstan in Uzbekistan.

Memorable jubilee sign “Manas-1000” (31 August 1995, Kyrgyzstan) — for active assistance in the preparation and celebration of the 1000th anniversary of the Epos “Manas” and a great contribution to the strengthening of friendship between the peoples of Kazakhstan and Kyrgyzstan.

Othan Order (August 27, 1999) — For merits to the Republic of Kazakhstan, a significant contribution to the formation and development of Kazakhstan legislation, the development and implementation of constitutional reforms.

Order “Commonwealth” (MPA CIS) (2001) for a special contribution to the development of parliamentarism, strengthening democracy, ensuring the rights and freedoms of citizens in the CIS member states.

Honor of the Senate of the Parliament of the Republic of Kazakhstan (2019) — for a great personal contribution to the development of parliamentarism and legislative activities.

The title “Honorary Cordan district of the Zhambyl region” (August 11, 2002) — for a significant contribution to the socio-economic development of the area.

The title “Honorary Citizen of the Zhambyl Region” (2002) — for merits in front of the region.

The honorary title “Kazakhstan Eңbek Sіңіrgen қairatkerі” (Honored Worker of Kazakhstan) (2009) — for a great contribution to the socio-economic cultural and political development of independent Kazakhstan.
