= Muhambet Kopeev =

Kazakh politician (born 1949)

Muhambet Köpeev
- Мұхамбет Көпеев

Deputy Chairman of the Senate
- In office 1 December 2005 – 24 November 2011 Serving with Aleksandr Sudin
- Chairman: Nurtai Abykayev; Kassym-Jomart Tokayev; Kairat Mami
- Preceded by: Omirbek Baigeldi
- Succeeded by: Qairat Işçanov

Deputy Chairman of the Mäjilis
- In office 1 December 1999 – 30 September 2004
- Chairman: Zharmakhan Tuyakbay
- Preceded by: Vasily Ospanov
- Succeeded by: Sergey Dyachenko

Minister of Emergency Situations
- In office 30 September 2004 – 11 August 2005
- President: Nursultan Nazarbayev
- Prime Minister: Daniyal Akhmetov
- Preceded by: Nurhambet Bijanov
- Succeeded by: Shalbay Kulmakhanov

Member of the Senate
- In office 29 November 2005 – 24 November 2011
- Appointed by: Nursultan Nazarbayev

Member of the Mäjilis
- In office 9 December 1995 – 30 September 2004
- Preceded by: Constituency established
- Succeeded by: Constituency abolished
- Constituency: 21st Jezkazgan (1995–1999); 35th Jezkazgan (1999–2004)

Personal details
- Born: 15 January 1949 (age 77) Rudnik, Kazakh SSR, Soviet Union
- Party: Nur Otan
- Spouse: Qalamqas Ablaeva
- Children: 3
- Education: Satbayev University; Alma-Ata Higher Party School; Abai Kazakh National Pedagogical University

Mūhambet Jūmanazarūly Köpeev (Kazakh: Мұхамбет Жұманазарұлы Көпеев; born 15 November 1949) is a Kazakh politician who served as a member of the Senate of Kazakhstan from 29 November 2005 to 24 November 2011 and was its Deputy Chairman. Prior to that, he was Minister of Emergency Situations from 30 September 2004 to 11 August 2005 and was a member of the Mäjilis from 1996 to 2004 where he was Mäjilis Deputy Chairman from 1 December 1999 until 2004.

== Biography ==
=== Early life and education ===
Muhammet Kopeev was born to a Muslim Kazakh family in the village of Rudnik in Karaganda Region, Kazakhstan. He is the son of Fariza and Jumanazar Kopeev. In 1972, he graduated from the Satbayev University with a degree mining engineering. From 1983 to 1985, Kopeev attended the Alma-Ata Higher Party School where he earned degree in political science and then in 1998 from the Abai Kazakh National Pedagogical University where he specialized in law.

=== Career ===
From 1973 to 1976, Kopeev was mining foreman, Secretary of the Komsomol Committee of the Dzhezkazgan Mining Trust. He then worked as a Secretary and First Secretary of the Nikolsk City Committee of the Leningrad Komsomol Committee until he became the instructor of the Dzhezkazgan Regional Party Committee in 1980. From 1985, Kopeev was the Second Secretary of the Dzhezdinsky District Party Committee. In 1986, he became the Chairman of the Qarajal City Executive Committee and from 1989, was the Head of Department of the Dzhezkazgan Regional Party Committee.

In 1991, Kopeev was appointed as the Chairman of the Administrative Council of the Jairem-Atasui Consolidated Economic Zone and was the Head of the Qarajal City Administration from 1992 until becoming a member of the Mäjilis in 1996 where he was member of the Finance and Budget Committee. On 1 December 1999, Kopeev was elected as the Mäjilis deputy chairman where he served the post until he was appointed as Minister of Emergency Situations on 30 September 2004.

On 29 November 2005, he was appointed as member of the Senate of Kazakhstan and from 1 December 2005 was its Deputy Chair until being dismissed as Senator on 24 November 2011.
