= Asqar Beisenbaev =

Kazakh politician

- Асқар Бейсенбаев
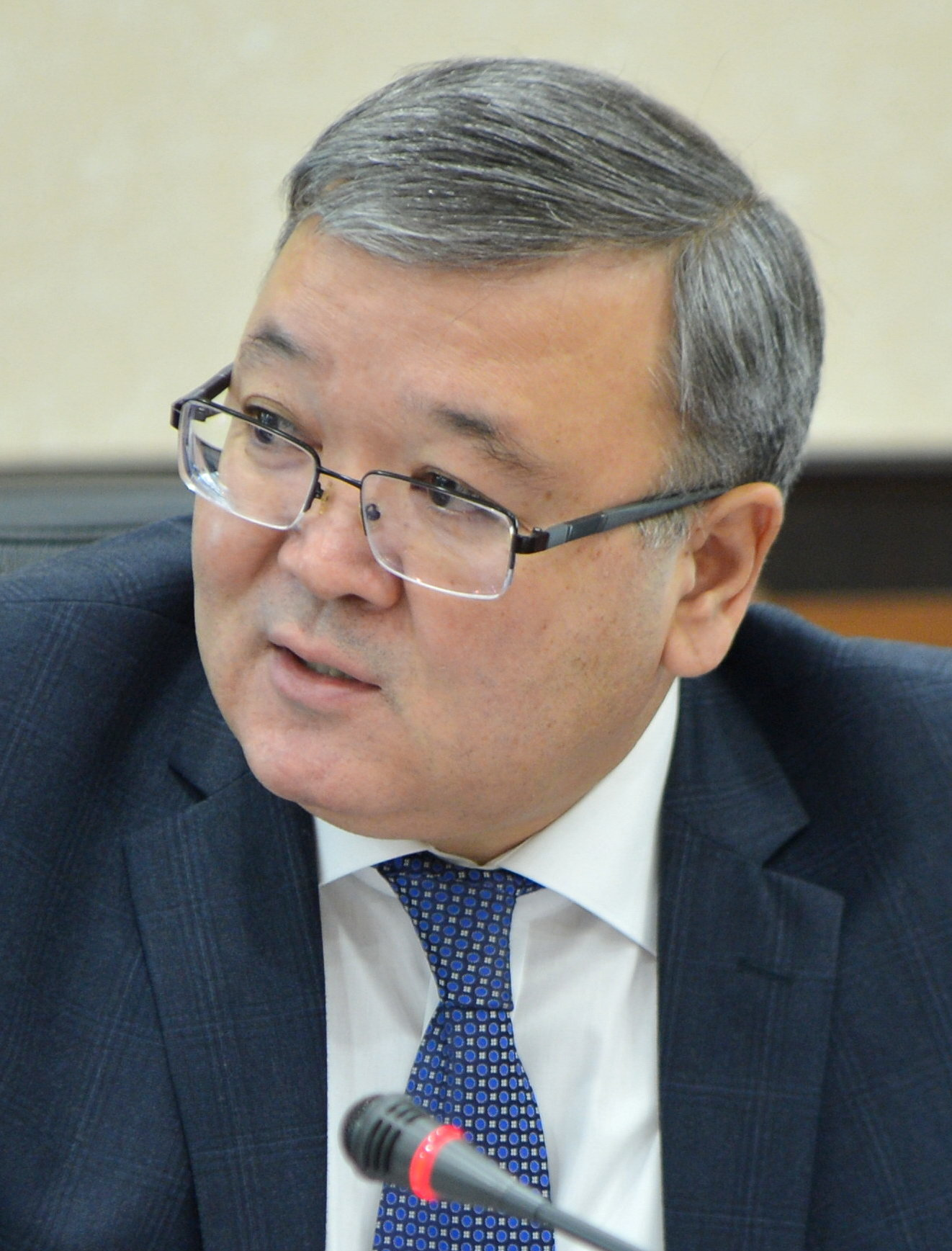
- Beisenbaev in 2018

Deputy Chairman of the Senate
- In office 3 September 2013 – 16 September 2016 Serving with Qairat Işçanov, Sergey Gromov
- Chairman: Kairat Mami; Kassym-Jomart Tokayev
- Preceded by: Aleksandr Sudin
- Succeeded by: Bektas Beknazarov

Member of the Senate
- In office 26 August 2013 – 12 August 2019
- Appointed by: Nursultan Nazarbayev

Member of the Mäjilis
- In office 2001 – 5 May 2008

Personal details
- Born: 31 January 1961 (age 65) Tulkibas District, Kazakh SSR, Soviet Union
- Party: Nur Otan (2007–present)
- Other political affiliations: Auyl (until 2007)
- Spouse: Gülbaqyt Azikenova
- Children: Elmira, Dauren, Bahtiar
- Education: Dzhambul Technological Institute of Light and Food Industry; Kazakh-Russian University

Asqar Asanūly Beisenbaev (Kazakh: Асқар Асанұлы Бейсенбаев; born 31 January 1961) is a Kazakh politician who has served as Ambassador to Belarus since 12 August 2019. Prior to that, he served as a Deputy Chairman of the Senate of Kazakhstan from 2013 to 2019, and member of the Mäjilis from 2001 to 2008.

== Biography ==
=== Early life and education ===
Beisenbaev was born in 1961 in the Tulkibas District of South Kazakhstan Region. In 1983, he graduated from the Almaty branch of the Dzhambul Technological Institute of Light and Food Industry with a degree in processing engineering and in 2004, from the Kazakh-Russian University with a degree in law.

=== Early career ===
In 1983, Beisenbaev became a shift engineer-technologist at the Tulkubas Cannery. From 1984, he was the chief technologist, and the head of the Cannery at the Lenin Joly State Farm before becoming the Second Secretary of the Sairam District Committee of the Komsomol in February 1988. From November 1988 to September 1992, he was the Chief Engineer and Director of the Tulkubas Cannery until he became the Director of the Tulkubasskiy Combine of Grain Products. Beisenbaev served as the Director until he became the President of Kokterek JSC in 1994.

=== Political career ===
In 1998, he was appointed as the Äkim of Tulkibas District. He served the post until becoming the member of the Mäjilis in 2001. After being reelected in 2004 from the 59th constituency of South Kazakhstan Region as Auyl party member, Beisenbaev served as a member of the Committee on Agrarian Issues of the Mäjilis, member of the parliament group on Otbasy Population and Development until 5 May 2008.

From 29 April to August 2008, Beisenbaev was the Head of the Representative Office of the President in the Parliament.

On 26 August 2013, he was appointed as a member of the Senate of Kazakhstan where he was elected its deputy chairman on 3 September 2013. Beisenbaev served as the deputy chairman until he was replaced by Bektas Beknazarov on 16 September 2016. From 2017, Beisenbaev was the Chairman of the Committee on Economic Policy, Innovative Development and Entrepreneurship of the Senate.

On 12 August 2019, he was relieved from his post as a Senator and was appointed as a Kazakh Ambassador to Belarus.

On 25 August 2023, he was dismissed from the post of Ambassador of Kazakhstan to Belarus
