= Aleksandr Sudin =

Kazakh politician

- Александр Судьин

Deputy Chairman of the Senate
- In office 3 September 2007 – 26 August 2013 Serving with Muhambet Kopeev; Qairat Işçanov
- Chairman: Kassym-Jomart Tokayev; Kairat Mami
- Preceded by: Office established
- Succeeded by: Asqar Beisenbaev

Member of the Senate
- In office 28 August 2007 – 26 August 2013
- Appointed by: Nursultan Nazarbayev

Personal details
- Born: 2 August 1950 (age 76) Balkhash, Kazakh SSR, Soviet Union
- Other political affiliations: QKP (until 1991)
- Spouse: Olga Sudina
- Children: Margarita
- Education: Satbayev University; Alma-Ata Higher Party School

Alexander Sergeevich Sudin (also Sudyin, Russian: Александр Сергеевич Судьин; born 2 August 1950) is a Kazakh politician who served as a Deputy Chairman of the Senate of Kazakhstan from 3 September 2007 to 26 August 2013. He served as the Chief of Staff of the Senate from September 2013 to January 2016.

== Biography ==
=== Early life and education ===
Sudin was born in 1950 in the city of Balkhash in Karaganda Region. In 1973, he graduated from the Satbayev University with a degree in electrical engineering and later in 1990, from the Alma-Ata Higher Party School with a degree in political science.

=== Career ===
In 1967, Sudin became an electrical fitter of the Dzhezkazgan MMC. From 1973 to 1976, he worked as an engineer, senior engineer of the Kazakh branch of the Selhozenergoproek All-Union Scientific Research Design Institute, then as an instructor, Deputy Head of Department, Responsible Organizer of the Almaty Regional Committee and Central Committee of the LKSMK until 1982. From there until 1991, Sudin was instructor, Deputy Head of the Regional Committee Department, Second Secretary of the Lenin District Committee, Head of the Department of the Almaty City Committee of the Communist Party of Kazakhstan.

From 1991 to 1992, Sudin served as the Head of the Department of Coordination and Personnel work of the Almaty City Administration. In 1993, he became the Deputy Chairman of the Central Election Commission and served the post until 1995 when being appointed as the State Inspector of the Organizational and Control Department of the Office of the President of Kazakhstan, First Deputy Head of the Department of Territorial Development of the Office of the Kazakh Government. In January 1996, Sudin became the Head of the Department of Civil Service and Personnel Policy of the Presidential Administration. From April 2004 to August 2007, he was the State Inspector, Deputy Head of the Department of State Control and Organizational Work of the Presidential Administration.

On 28 August 2007, Sudin became a member of the Senate of Kazakhstan where he was elected as Deputy Chair on 3 September 2007. From there, Sudin served as a member of the National Commission for Women Affairs and Family and Demographic Policy under the President. He was dismissed from his post on 26 August 2013 and became the Chief of Staff of the Senate in September 2013 which he served until January 2016.
