= Olga Perepechina =

Kazakh politician (born 1967)

MP Olga Perepechina
- Ольга Перепечина
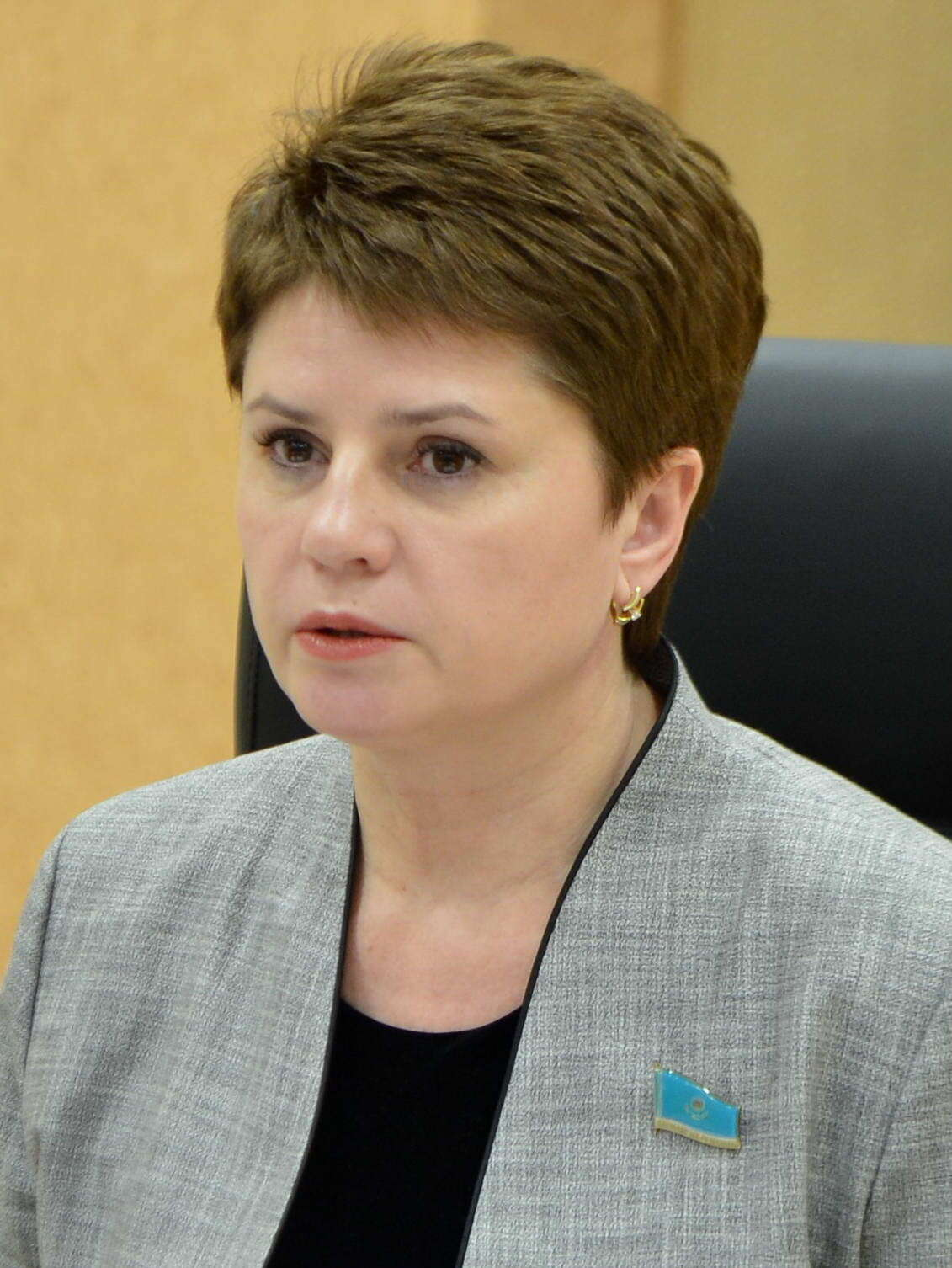
- Perepechina in 2019

Member of the Kurultai
- Incumbent
- Assumed office 27 August 2026
- Preceded by: Office established

Deputy Chairwoman of the Senate of Kazakhstan
- In office 27 January 2022 – 1 July 2026 Serving with Asqar Şäkirov (2022–2023); Jaqyp Asanov (2023–2026)
- Chairman: Mäulen Äşimbaev
- Preceded by: Nurlan Äbdirov
- Succeeded by: Office abolished

Senator from North Kazakhstan Region
- In office 2 October 2014 – 1 July 2026 Serving with Serik Bilälov, Erik Sultanov, Gülmira Kärimova, Äsem Rahmetova
- Preceded by: Anatoliy Bashmakov

Personal details
- Born: 23 August 1967 (age 59) Novonikolskoye, Bishkul District, North Kazakhstan Oblast, Kazakh SSR, Soviet Union
- Party: Amanat
- Spouse: Yuriy Perepechin
- Children: 2
- Education: Maltsev Kurgan State Agricultural Academy

Olga Valentinovna Perepechina (pe-re-PE-chee-nah; Russian: Ольга Валентиновна Перепечина; born 23 August 1967) is a Kazakh politician who served as member of the Kurultai since 2026. Previously she was the deputy chair of the Senate from 2022 to 2026 and senator for North Kazakhstan Region from 2014 to 2026.

== Biography ==
Perepechina was born on 23 August 1967 in Novonikolskoye, Bishkul District, North Kazakhstan Oblast.

In 1989, she graduated from the Kurgan Agricultural Institute with a specialization in economics and the organization of agricultural production.

From 1989 to 1992, Perepechina worked as an economist at the Novokamensky State Farm in the village of Novokamenka, Bishkul District. Between 1992 and 1996, she served as the chief economist of an agricultural firm.

In 1996, Perepechina entered public service, becoming the head of the Finance Department of Kyzylzhar District, a position she held until 2002. From 2002 to 2011, she headed the Finance Department of the North Kazakhstan Region, overseeing regional budget planning and financial administration.

Between 2011 and 2014, she served first as Deputy Head and later as Head of the Statistics Department of the North Kazakhstan Region.

In October 2014, Perepechina was elected as deputy of the Senate of the Parliament of the Republic of Kazakhstan (5th convocation) representing the North Kazakhstan Region. Since her election to the Senate, she has served on the Committee on Finance and Budget, where she has remained an active member throughout her tenure. On 23 October 2014, she additionally joined the Commission for Monitoring the Use of the Electronic System and the work of its service personnel. In September 2017, Perepechina was appointed Chairperson of the Committee on Finance and Budget, continuing to oversee key issues of fiscal policy and parliamentary budget review.

She was re-elected for a new term in the Senate election held on 12 August 2020.

On 27 January 2022, she was appointed Deputy Chairwoman of the Senate.

On 1 July 2026, the mandates of all members of parliament were automatically terminated following the implementation of a new Constitution of Kazakhstan, which replaced the bicameral parliament with a unicameral Kurultai.

In the Kurultai elections held on 23 August 2026, the Ädilet party secured a majority of votes. On 27 August, the Central Election Commission registered Olga Perepechina as a member of the 1st Kurultai.

== Personal life ==
Perepechina speaks Russian and Kazakh. She is married to Yury Leonidovich Perepechin (born 1965). They have two daughters: Irina (born 1990) and Anastasia (born 2000) Perepechina.
