= Äbilgazy Qusaiynov =

Kazakh politician

- Әбілғазы Құсайынов
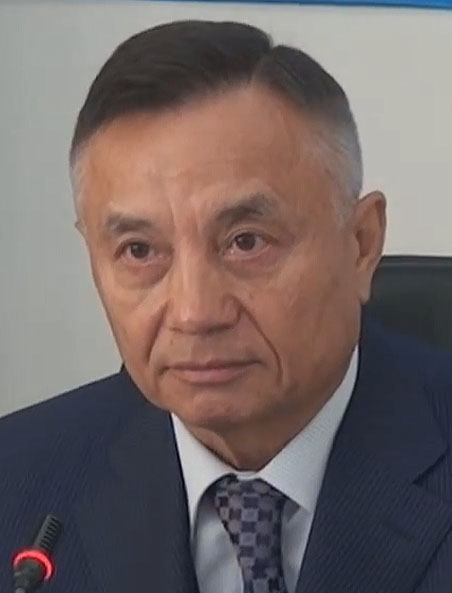
- Qusaiynov in 2012

Deputy Chairman of the Senate
- In office 10 March 1999 – 29 November 1999
- Chairman: Omirbek Baigeldi
- Preceded by: Aitkul Samaqova
- Succeeded by: Omirbek Baigeldi

Minister of Transport and Communications
- In office 3 March 2009 – 12 April 2011
- President: Nursultan Nazarbayev
- Prime Minister: Karim Massimov
- Preceded by: Serik Akhmetov
- Succeeded by: Berik Kamaliev

Äkim of Karaganda Region
- In office 20 January 2012 – 28 January 2013
- Preceded by: Serik Akhmetov
- Succeeded by: Bauyrjan Abdishev

Senator for Karaganda Region
- In office 5 December 1995 – 17 September 1999 Serving with Duman Abildinov
- Preceded by: Office established
- Succeeded by: Walikhan Qaisarov

Chairman of the Federation of Trade Unions
- In office 28 January 2013 – 22 November 2017
- Preceded by: Siyazbek Mukashev
- Succeeded by: Baqıtjan Abdirahimov

Personal details
- Born: 6 February 1952 (age 74) Maiözek, Kazakh SSR, Soviet Union
- Party: Nur Otan
- Spouse: Galia Qusaiynova
- Children: Qımbat, Arman
- Education: Karaganda State Technical University; Russian Presidential Academy of National Economy and Public Administration

Äbilgazy Qaliaqparuly Qusaiynov (Kazakh: Әбілғазы Қалиақпарұлы Құсайынов, Äbılğazy Qaliaqparūly Qūsaiynov, [æbɘlɣɑzɯ qɑlijɑqpaɾo̙ɫɯ qo̙sajɯnəf]; born 6 February 1952) is a Kazakh politician who served as a Chairman of the Federation of Trade Unions of Kazakhstan from 2013 to 2017. He was the Äkim of Karaganda Region from 20 January 2012 to 28 January 2013 and prior to that, was Minister of Transport and Communications from 3 March 2009 to 12 April 2011. From 1995 to 1999, Qusaiynov was Senator for Karaganda Region where he served as its Deputy Chair from 10 March to 29 November 1999.

In 2015, Qusaiynov ran in the snap presidential election as an Independent candidate where he won only 0.64% of the vote.

== Biography ==
=== Early life and education ===
Qusaiynov was born in 1952 in the village of Maiözek in Karaganda Region. In 1981, he graduated from the Karaganda State Technical University with a degree in mechanical engineering. In 1992, he earned a degree in political science in absentee from the Russian Presidential Academy of National Economy and Public Administration.

=== Career ===
From 1971 to 1980, Qusaiynov was an underground concrete worker at a metallurgical plant, an underground drifter, a miner, a mining foreman at the Dolinskaya Mine, a foreman, a senior foreman of a vocational school. Until 1990, he worked as an instructor, head of department, First Deputy Chairman of the Kirov Regional Executive Committee, First Secretary of the Kirov Regional Committee of the Communist Party of Kazakhstan (QKP). In 1990, Qusaiynov became the Second Secretary of the Karaganda Regional Committee of the QKP.

From 1991, he was the Chairman of the Karaganda Regional Committee on Pricing and Antimonopoly Policy until he was elected as Senator for Karaganda Region on 5 December 1995. From there, Qusaiynov served as member of the Committee on Legislation and Judicial and Legal Reform and the deputy chair from 10 March 1999.

In 1999, Qusaiynov was appointed as Vice Minister of Transport and Communications. From 2001, he served as a Chairman of the Committee for Roads of the Ministry of Transport and Communications. On 4 March 2002, Qusaiynov was appointed as Vice Minister of Economy and Trade and on 3 September 2002, he became Vice Minister of Industry and Trade.

From 23 June 2003, he served as Chairman of the Committee for Standardization, Metrology and Certification and Committee for Technical Regulation and Metrology of the Ministry of Industry and Trade. From August 2005 to 28 October 2007, Qusaiynov worked as First Vice Minister, Vice Minister of Transport and Communications until he became the Executive Secretary of the Ministry of Transport and Communications.

On 3 March 2009, Qusaiynov was appointed as Minister of Transport and Communications where he served the post until he was relieved on 12 April 2011. From 20 January 2012, Qusaiynov served as the Äkim of Karaganda Region before he became the Chairman of Federation of Trade Unions of Kazakhstan (QRKF) on 28 January 2013.

=== 2015 presidential campaign ===
On 6 March 2015, shortly after the announcement of a snap presidential elections, Qusaiynov announced his bid for presidency after submitting documents to participate in the race as an independent. On 18 March, he became a registered candidate.

Qusaiynov campaigned on the issues revolving mostly on environmental problems such as rational and planned use of natural resources, the protection of the environment from pollution, the introduction of a planned system of state control which aims to measure the rational use, protection and restoration of natural resources. He won 0.64% of the vote, taking last place in the race.

=== Post-election ===
Qusaiynov continued serving as the Chairman of QRKF until his decision to retire on 22 November 2017. Under his leadership, the QRKF became part of the ITUC. Representatives of Kazakh trade unions have become regular participants in various seminars, conferences, meetings with colleagues from other countries.
