= Qairat Işçanov =

Kazakh politician (1950–2022)

Qаyrаt İşаnov
- Қайрат Ищанов

Deputy Chairman of the Senate
- In office 24 November 2011 – 14 January 2016 Serving with Aleksandr Sudin, Asqar Beisenbaev
- Chairman: Kairat Mami; Kassym-Jomart Tokayev
- Preceded by: Muhammed Kopeev
- Succeeded by: Sergey Gromov

Senator for Atyrau Region
- In office 19 August 2005 – 28 June 2017 Serving with Jandarbek Kakishev, Sarsenbai Ensegenov
- Preceded by: Asqar Qujagaliev
- Succeeded by: Gumar Duisembaev

Personal details
- Born: 28 September 1950 Guryev, Kazakh SSR, USSR
- Died: 24 November 2022 (aged 72) Astana, Kazakhstan
- Party: Nur Otan (1999–2022)
- Other political affiliations: CPSU (1972–1991)
- Spouse: Jupar Quanova
- Children: Ajargul, Rustem, Serik
- Education: Satbayev University

Qairat Qydyrbaiūly İşanov (Kazakh: Қайрат Қыдырбайұлы Ищанов; 28 September 1950 – 24 November 2022) was a Kazakh politician who served as a Senator for Atyrau Region from 2005 to 2017 and was Deputy Chair of the Senate from 24 November 2011.

== Biography ==
=== Early life and education ===
Işçanov was born in the town of Guryev (now Atyrau). In 1980, he graduated from the Satbayev University with a degree in mechanical engineering.

=== Career ===
In 1968, Işçanov became a fisherman of the collective farm Kyzyl Balyk. From 1972 to 1983, he was ship mechanic, civil engineer of the farm until he became an instructor of the Balykshinsky District Committee of the CPC. From 1984, Işçanov was a Chief Engineer of the Qyzyl Balyq until he became the Chairman of the Board of the Kurmangazy collective farm. In 1988, he became the Chairman of the Board of the collective farms 70 years of October and Qyzyl Balyq, and from 1991 to 1994, Işçanov was the Chairman of the Balyksha District Executive Committee, First Deputy Chairman of the Executive Committee, Head of the Balyksha District Administration until he became the Chairman of the Board of the Jambyl Collective Farm, Production Cooperative.

From 1999 to 2000, Işçanov served as a Secretary of Atyrau Region Mäslihat. He then again became the Chairman of Jambyl Collective Farm, Production Cooperative where he worked shortly until he was appointed Deputy Äkim of Atyrau Region in 2001.

On 19 August 2005, he was elected as member of the Senate of Kazakhstan from Atyrau Region where he served as Chairman of the Finance and Budget Committee and from 2007 served as Chairman of the Committee on Agrarian Issues and Environmental Protection. On 24 November 2011, Işçanov was elected as Deputy Chair of the Senate until he was replaced by Sergey Gromov on 14 January 2016. He continued serving as a Senator until he was succeeded by Gumar Duisembaev on 28 June 2017. Since 20 September 2019, he has been serving as member of the Council of Senators of Kazakhstan.
