= Musabek Alimbekov =

Kazakh politician

- Мұсабек Әлімбеков

5th Chairman of the Supreme Court of Kazakhstan
- In office April 2009 – April 2011
- Preceded by: Kairat Mami
- Succeeded by: Bektas Beknazarov

Personal details
- Born: 4 January 1957 (age 69) Zhambyl Oblast, Kazakh SSR, Soviet Union
- Profession: Jurist; politician

Mūsabek Tūrğynbekūly Älımbekov (Note: Often transliterated as Musabek Turgynbekovich Alimbekov through a Russified Romanization of Мусабек Тургынбекович Алимбеков.) (Kazakh: Мұсабек Тұрғынбекұлы Әлімбеков; born 4 January 1957) is a Kazakh politician and jurist who served as the fourth chairman of the supreme court of Kazakhstan.
