= Kairat Mami =

Kazakh jurist and politician (born 1954)

- Қайрат Мәми
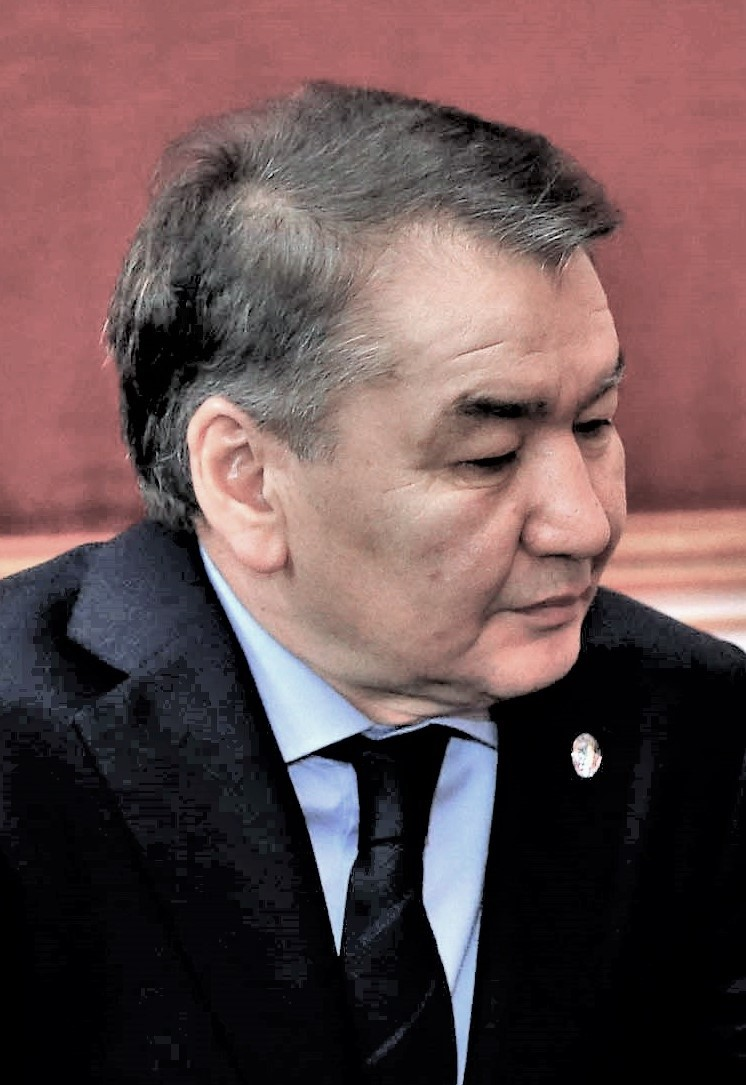
- Mami in 2013

4th Chairman of the Constitutional Council
- In office 11 December 2017 – 1 January 2023
- President: Nursultan Nazarbayev; Kassym-Jomart Tokayev
- Preceded by: Igor Rogov
- Succeeded by: Elvira Azimova (Constitutional Court)

5th Chairman of the Senate
- In office 15 April 2011 – 16 October 2013
- Deputy: Muhammed Kopeev; Aleksandr Sudin; Qairat Işçanov; Asqar Beisenbaev
- Preceded by: Kassym-Jomart Tokayev
- Succeeded by: Kassym-Jomart Tokayev

7th Chairman of the Supreme Court of Kazakhstan
- In office 16 October 2013 – 11 December 2017
- President: Nursultan Nazarbayev
- Preceded by: Bektas Beknazarov
- Succeeded by: Jaqyp Asanov
- In office 1 September 2000 – 3 April 2009
- Preceded by: Maksut Narikbaev
- Succeeded by: Musabek Alimbekov

Prosecutor General of Kazakhstan
- In office 3 April 2009 – 15 April 2011
- President: Nursultan Nazarbayev
- Preceded by: Rashid Tusupbekov
- Succeeded by: Asqat Dauylbaev

Personal details
- Born: 9 May 1954 (age 71) Jambyl, Kazakh SSR, Soviet Union
- Party: Nur Otan
- Profession: Jurist

Qairat Äbdırazaqūly Mämi (mah-ME, Kazakh: Қайрат Әбдіразақұлы Мәми, [qɑjˈrɑt æbdɘrɑˌzɑqʊˈɫɤ mæˈmɘj]; born May 9, 1954) is a Kazakh jurist and politician. He served as Chairman of the Senate of Kazakhstan, Chairman of the Supreme Court of Kazakhstan, and Chairman of the Constitutional Council of Kazakhstan.

== Early life ==
Mami was born in 1954. He graduated from Kazakh State University with a specialization in law.

== Career ==
In April 2011, Mami was appointed as a Member of the Senate of the Parliament of the Republic of Kazakhstan. He was later approved as Chairman of the Senate. Throughout his career, he has held several positions, including Chairman of the Guryev (Atyrau) Regional Court, Member of the Supreme Court of the Kazakh SSR, Chairman of the Almaty Municipal Court, Chairman of the Panel of the Supreme Court, Vice Minister of Justice, Deputy Head of the Presidential Administration, Chairman of the Supreme Court, and Prosecutor General of the Republic of Kazakhstan.

== Recognition ==
Mami has been awarded the Order of Parasat (2nd degree), the Order of the Leopard, and four state medals.
