= List of Äkims of Jambyl Region =

This is the list of äkıms of Jambyl Region that have held the position since 1992.

== List of Äkıms ==
- Ömırbek Bäigeldı (12 February 1992 – 6 October 1995)
- Amalbek Tşanov (6 October 1995 – 20 January 1998)
- Sarybai Qalmyrzaev (21 January 1998 – 17 February 1999)
- Serık Ümbetov (17 February 1999 – 14 May 2004)
- Börıbai Jeksembin (14 May 2004 – 30 November 2009)
- Qanat Bozymbaev (30 November 2009 – 20 December 2013)
- Kärım Kökırekbaev (20 December 2013 – 10 January 2018)
- Asqar Myrzahmetov (10 January 2018 – 10 February 2020)
- Berdıbek Saparbaev (10 February 2020 – present)
