= Jaqyp Asanov =

Kazakh politician

MP Jaqyp Asanov
- Жақып Асанов
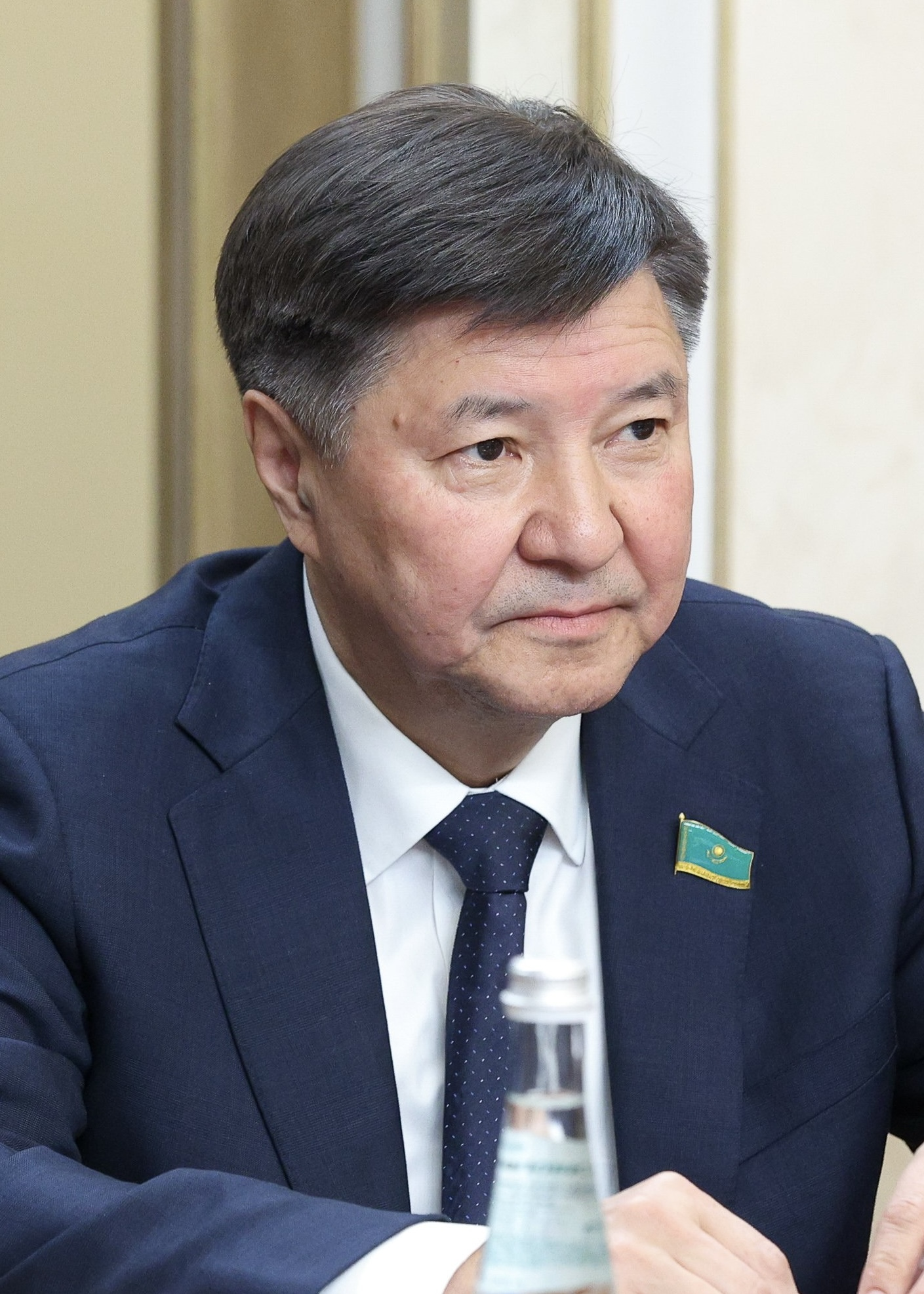
- Asanov in 2026

Deputy Chairman of the Senate of Kazakhstan
- In office 26 January 2023 – 1 July 2026 Serving with Olga Perepechina
- Chairman: Mäulen Äşimbaev
- Preceded by: Asqar Şäkirov
- Succeeded by: Office abolished

Member of the Senate
- In office 24 January 2023 – 1 July 2026
- Appointed by: Kassym-Jomart Tokayev

8th Chairman of the Supreme Court of Kazakhstan
- In office 11 December 2017 – 8 December 2022
- Appointed by: Kassym-Jomart Tokayev
- Preceded by: Kairat Mami
- Succeeded by: Aslambek Merğaliev

8th Prosecutor General of Kazakhstan
- In office 25 April 2016 – 11 December 2017
- President: Nursultan Nazarbayev; Kassym-Jomart Tokayev
- Preceded by: Ashat Dauylbaev
- Succeeded by: Qairat Qojamjarov

Deputy Prosecutor General of Kazakhstan
- In office 6 September 2012 – 25 April 2016
- Prosecutor General: Asqat Dauylbaev
- Preceded by: Asqat Dauylbaev
- Succeeded by: Qairat Qojamjarov

Member of the Mäjilis
- In office 27 August 2007 – 6 September 2012

Personal details
- Born: 17 August 1963 (age 63) Kzyl-Orda, Kazakh SSR, Soviet Union
- Party: Amanat
- Education: S. M. Kirov Kazakh State University
- Profession: Politician, lawyer, and jurist
- Awards: Order of Parasat; Order of Kurmet

Jaqyp Qajymanūly Asanov (Kazakh: Жақып Қажыманұлы Асанов; born 17 August 1963) is a Kazakh politician, lawyer, and jurist. He is currently the deputy chairman of the Senate of the Parliament of Kazakhstan, a position he has held since 26 January 2023. Asanov has held multiple senior positions in the judiciary and government, including chairman of the Supreme Court of Kazakhstan and Prosecutor General of Kazakhstan. He previously served as a deputy of the Mäjilis of the Parliament of Kazakhstan.

== Early life and education ==
Asanov was born on 17 August 1963 in Kzyl-Orda. He graduated from S. M. Kirov Kazakh State University with a degree in law. Following graduation, he began his career as an intern at the Kyzylorda Regional Bar Association.

== Career ==
=== Early career ===
From 1986 to 1993, Asanov worked in the Prosecutor's Office of Kyzylorda Region, serving as senior assistant to the prosecutor of Kyzylorda, assistant and senior assistant to the regional prosecutor, and head of a department within the regional prosecutor's office. Between 1993 and 1994, he held roles in the Prosecutor General's Office of Kazakhstan, including Senior Prosecutor of the General Supervision Department and Head of the Department for Supervision of Compliance with Legislation on Banks, Financial, and Credit Relations.

From 1994 to 1996, Asanov worked in the Presidential Administration of Kazakhstan as a consultant and head of a sector in the Department of Law, Law and Order, and Judicial Reform. In 1996, he became First Deputy Head of the Tax Police Department in South Kazakhstan Region. From 1997 to 2001, he served as Senior Assistant to the Prosecutor General and Head of various departments overseeing legality in state bodies and socio-economic matters.

=== Prosecutorial and judicial positions ===
Between 2001 and 2003, Asanov served as First Deputy Prosecutor of Almaty and then as Prosecutor of Pavlodar Region. In June 2003, he was appointed Vice Minister of Justice of Kazakhstan.

From 2007 to 2012, Asanov was a deputy of the Mäjilis of the Parliament of Kazakhstan for the 4th and 5th convocations on the party list of the Nur Otan People's Democratic Party. He served on the Committee on Legislation and Judicial and Legal Reform. On 6 September 2012, he was appointed Deputy Prosecutor General of Kazakhstan. On 25 April 2016, he became Prosecutor General of the Republic of Kazakhstan.

On 11 December 2017, Asanov was appointed chairman of the Supreme Court of Kazakhstan, a position he held until 8 December 2022.

=== Senate of Kazakhstan ===
On 24 January 2023, Asanov was appointed as a deputy of the Senate of the Parliament of Kazakhstan by President Kassym-Jomart Tokayev. Two days later, on 26 January, he was appointed deputy chairman of the Senate.

== Awards ==
- Order of Parasat (2017)
- Order of Kurmet
- Medal "10th Anniversary of the Republic of Kazakhstan"
- Badge "Honorary Worker of the Prosecutor's Office of the Republic of Kazakhstan"
- Medal "IPA CIS. 25 years" (27 March 2017, CIS Interparliamentary Assembly)
- Jubilee Medal "IPA CIS. 30 years" (26 November 2023, CIS Interparliamentary Assembly)
