= Oralbay Abdykarimov =

Kazakh politician (born 1944)

- Оралбай Әбдікәрімов

2nd Chairman of the Senate
- In office 1 December 1999 – 10 March 2004
- Deputy: Omirbek Baigeldi
- Preceded by: Omirbek Baigeldi
- Succeeded by: Nurtai Abykayev

State Secretary of Kazakhstan
- In office 10 March 2004 – 15 May 2007
- President: Nursultan Nazarbayev
- Preceded by: Imangali Tasmagambetov
- Succeeded by: Kanat Saudabayev

Head of the Presidential Administration of Kazakhstan
- In office 14 October 1996 – 21 October 1997
- President: Nursultan Nazarbayev
- Preceded by: Akhmetzhan Yessimov
- Succeeded by: Sarybai Kalmurzaev

Member of the Senate
- In office 1 December 1999 – 10 March 2004
- Appointed by: Nursultan Nazarbayev
- In office 28 August 2007 – 26 August 2013
- Appointed by: Nursultan Nazarbayev

Member of the Supreme Soviet of Kazakhstan
- In office 25 March 1990 – 1992

Personal details
- Born: 18 December 1944 (age 81) Kievka, Karaganda Region, Kazakh SSR, Soviet Union
- Party: QKP
- Spouse: Jamal Abdykarimova
- Children: 4
- Education: Karagandy State University; Almaty Higher Party School

Oralbai Äbdıkärımov (Note: Often transliterated as Oralbay Abdykarimov through a Russified Romanization of Оралбай Абдыкаримов.) (Kazakh: Оралбай Әбдікәрімов; born 18 December 1944) is a Kazakh politician who was the State Secretary of Kazakhstan from 10 March 2004 to 15 May 2007. He served as the Head of the Presidential Administration of Kazakhstan from 14 October 1996 to 21 October 1997 until becoming the head of a state anti-corruption commission after the President appointed him on 29 November 1999 and as chair and of the Senate of Kazakhstan, the second highest position in the Government of Kazakhstan from 1 December 1999 to 10 January 2004. Abdykarimov was also a member of the Senate while serving as the chair and from 28 August 2007 to 26 August 2013 and member of the Supreme Soviet of Kazakhstan from 1990 to 1992.

== Dismissal from the Senate Chair ==
Abdykarimov was asked to resign from his Senate Chair on 10 March 2004. Nurtai Abykayev, the former head of the National Security Committee, was appointed to the Senate and then immediately elected Abdykarimov's successor. Altynbek Sarsenbayev, formerly Information Minister in the Nazarbayev administration, said, "According to the constitution, the president can recommend a speaker of the Senate, but in both cases where this has happened, with Oralbay Abdykarimov and [now with] Nurtay Abikayev, the president's nominee was elected as speaker. This diminishes the authority and respect of the whole Senate in front of ordinary citizens. That is the image society sees of the Senate itself and the parliament as a whole."

Abdykarimov, when he served as Chairman of the Kazakh Senate, said "Kazakhstan and Russia are strategic partners and reliable allies" in the "Kazakh-Russian Interaction in the 21st Century and the Challenges of Globalization" conference in January 2004.

== Delimitation of borders ==
Adakhan Madumarov, Secretary of State for Kyrgyzstan, led a delegation to Almaty, Kazakhstan where he met with Abdykarimov and discussed cooperation between the countries in gas, banking, and labor migration. Abdykarimov said that the trilateral agreement signed by the governments of Kazakhstan, Kyrgyzstan, and Uzbekistan in July 2001 setting a frontier junction point between the three countries had been ratified by the Kazakh Parliament, but not by the Kyrgyz Parliament.

== Election law ==
Abdykarimov announced on 14 September 2003 that the Kazakh Parliament considered it a priority to change election laws in Kazakhstan so that regional governors would run for office in elections rather than be appointed. He denied allegations that the bill had yet to pass because the administration wanted the September 2003 elections to occur before the law would take effect. Abdykarimov said he believed the law would be passed prior to the 2004 elections to the Majilis.

== Foreign relations ==
Abdykarimov awarded Eduard Khurshudian, the then retiring Armenian Ambassador to Kazakhstan, with a diploma on 20 July 2004 for his service as Ambassador from 1999 to 2004.

Abdykarimov met with visiting Turkish Justice Minister Jemil Cicek on 15 October 2005. They decided to launch air traffic between Astana and Istanbul on 19 October.

Abdykarimov received Abdul Yelakh Mukhammed Khadjar, Yemen's Ambassador to Kazakhstan, on 20 October 2005.

Abdykarimov met Israeli Ambassador to Kazakhstan Michael Lotem on 8 August 2006 in the Ak-Orda Presidential Palace in Astana. Abdykarimov thanked Lotem for his nation's involvement in the Conference on Interaction and Confidence-Building Measures in Asia and the First Congress of the Leaders of the World and Traditional Religions in Astana.

Abdykarimov met with Gerard Perrolet, France's Ambassador to Kazakhstan, on 3 July 2006 as finished his service, in Almaty, Kazakhstan. Journalists interviewed Perrolet after their meeting and he discussed France-Kazakhstan relations.

Abdykarimov met with Kalman Mizsei, the Assistant to the UN Secretary and Director of the Regional Bureau for Europe and CIS, in Ak Orda. They discussed a possible increase in United Nations Development Program funding for the Kazakh State. Mizsei thanked Abdykarimov for his government's contributions to regional security.

== Human rights ==
Abdykarimov chaired an enlarged session of the Human Rights Commission under Nazarbayev in March 2004. Human rights experts, government officials, NGO officials, and legal experts participated. Abdykarimov said the commission worked on "tracing the tendencies," "show[ing] the dynamics, our legislative initiatives and our laws on protection of human and civil rights." The commission delivered a report to him on 24 March, which he submitted to Nazarbayev. Kazakhstan achieved great progress in human rights, says Prof. Mullerson.

Rein Mullerson, the former Regional Adviser to the Office of the UN High Commissioner for Human Rights for Central Asia and International Law Professor of the London King's College, met with Abdykarimov on 27 September 2005. They discussed politics and elections in Kazakhstan, ratification of the "Pact on Human Rights" and human rights protocols regarding appeals to the international community and abolition of capital punishment. Mullerson applauded Kazakhstan's process in improving its human rights record relative to the other members of the CIS.

== Israel ==
He met with Moshe Kamkhy, Israel's ambassador to Uzbekistan, on 9 August and thanked Ambassador Kamkhy for his service as they discussed bilateral relations. Kamkhy then held a press conference. During the conference social and economic ties between the countries and moving the Israeli Embassy to Astana were discussed. 95 Kazakh farmers, managers and scientists have trained in Israel.

== Local government ==
Nazarbayev met with Abdykarimov, head of the Presidential Administration Adilbek Dzhaksybekov, and Agriculture Minister Akhmetzhan Yesimov on 5 June 2006 to discuss local government. Nazarbayev emphasized his belief in the decentralization of power and strengthening of local government.

== Press ==
Abdykarimov presented awards and grants on behalf of President Nazarbayev to members of the Kazakh press on 29 June 2006 in Astana after Nazarbayev signed a resolution allowing the government to reward journalists.
