= Pavel Kazantsev =

Kazakhstani politician (born 1960)

- Павел Казанцев
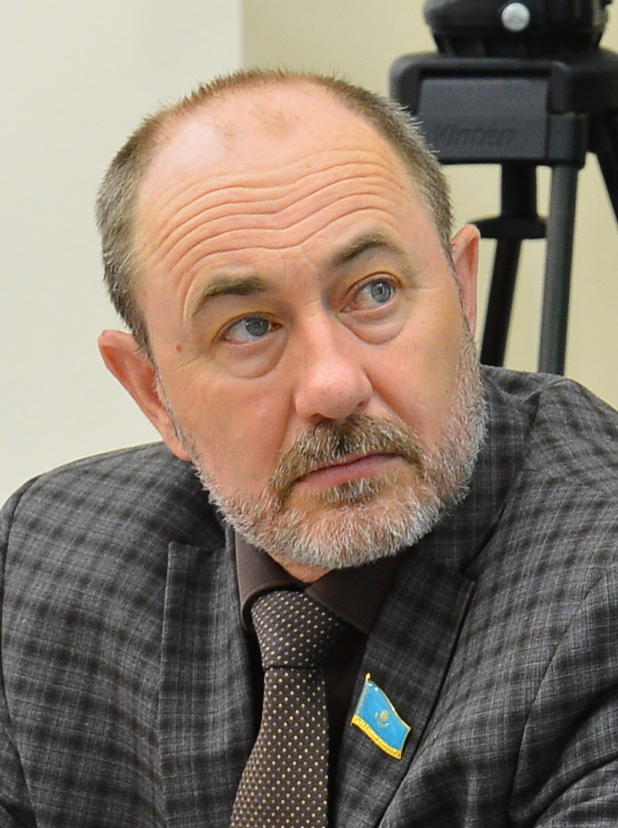
- Kazantsev in 2016

Deputy Chairman of the Mäjilis
- In office 15 January 2021 – 19 January 2023 Serving with Balaim Kesebaeva
- Chairman: Nurlan Nigmatulin
- Preceded by: Vladimir Bozhko
- Succeeded by: Albert Rau

Member of the Mäjilis
- In office 20 March 2016 – 1 July 2026

Member of the Astana City Mäslihat
- In office 20 September 2003 – 20 June 2007

Personal details
- Born: 22 March 1960 (age 66) Tomsk, Russian SFSR, Soviet Union
- Party: Nur Otan
- Children: 2
- Education: Tselinograd Civil Engineering Institute; Dzerzhinsky Higher School of the KGB

Pavel Olegovich Kazantsev (Russian: Павел Олегович Казанцев, Russian pronunciation: [ˈpavʲɪl ɐˈlʲeɡəvʲɪtɕ kɐˈzantsɨf]; born 22 March 1960) is a Kazakhstani politician as Mäjilis member since 2016. Kazantsev previously served as the Deputy Chairman of the Mäjilis from 2021 to 2023.

== Biography ==
=== Early life and education ===
Kazantsev was born in 1960 in the city of Tomsk in present-day Russia. In 1982, he graduated with honors from the Tselinograd Civil Engineering Institute, specializing in automobiles and auto industry. Then in 1986, from the Dzerzhinsky Higher School of the KGB.

=== Career ===
Kazantsev began his career in 1982 as a senior engineer, head of a technical and technical department, a senior engineer for safety and labor protection, a foreman of ATP-3 of the cargo auto department of the Tselinograd Region under the Kazakh SSR Ministry of Transport. From 1986, he served in KGB Directorate in the region.

From 1992, Kazantsev worked in the head of department, chairman of the Committee for Foreign Economic Relations, representative of the Ministry of Foreign Economic Relations in the administration of the Akmola Region. In 1995, he was appointed as deputy äkim of Akmola and from 1997, Kazantsev served as an advisor to the deputy chairman of the Administrative Council of the FEZ. From 1998, he worked as a deputy director of the Fund for Economic and Social Development of FEZ, deputy chairman of the board and head of the Investment Department of the Akmola Fund.

In 1999, Kazantsev was appointed as a director of the consulting company Center for Business Initiatives. While working in the post, he served as a member of the Astana City Mäslihat from 2003 and a representative of the CISCO company in Astana from 2005 until 2007, when he became Deputy and First Deputy Chairman of the Nur Otan Astana City Branch. In 2010, he was appointed as director of the Department of Political Work, Department of Organizational and Political Work of the Central Office of the Nur Otan where he worked until 2013. From 2014 to 2015, Kazantsev briefly served as the development manager, head of the planning service for programs, events, external relations and communications of the Foundation of the First President of the Republic of Kazakhstan – Leader of the Nation, then from 2015 to 2016 as the Deputy Chairman – Director of the Department of Organizational Personnel Work and Assets of the Federation of Trade Unions of Kazakhstan.

=== Member of the Mäjilis (2016–present) ===
In the aftermath of 2016 Kazakh legislative election, Kazantsev was elected as a member of the Mäjilis. From there, he served as a member of the Committee on Economic Reform and Regional Development of the Mäjilis. Following his reelection in 2021, Kazantsev, along with Balaim Kesebaeva, became the Deputy Chairman of the Mäjilis. He was removed from the position of Deputy Chair on January 19, 2023.

== Personal life ==
Kazantsev is married and has two children. He serves as president and vice president of several associations in Kazakhstan. Since 2018, Kazantsev has been the chairman of Tourism Industry Committee of the Presidium of the Atameken National Chamber of Entrepreneurs of the Republic of Kazakhstan and Nur Otan Party Control Committee.
