= Nurtai Abykayev =

Kazakh politician (born 1947)

- Нұртай Әбіқаев
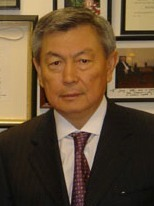

3rd Chairman of the Senate
- In office 10 March 2004 – 11 January 2007
- Deputy: Omirbek Baigeldi; Muhammed Kopeev
- Preceded by: Oralbay Abdykarimov
- Succeeded by: Kassym-Jomart Tokayev

Head of the Presidential Administration of Kazakhstan
- In office 29 January 2002 – 10 March 2004
- President: Nursultan Nazarbayev
- Preceded by: Sarybai Qalmyrzaev
- Succeeded by: Imangali Tasmagambetov

Member of the Senate
- In office 25 December 2015 – 13 July 2017
- Appointed by: Nursultan Nazarbayev
- In office 10 March 2004 – 11 January 2007
- Appointed by: Nursultan Nazarbayev

Chairman of the National Security Committee
- In office 23 August 2010 – 25 December 2015
- President: Nursultan Nazarbayev
- Preceded by: Adil Shayakhmetov
- Succeeded by: Vladimir Zhumakanov
- In office 1 September 1998 – 9 August 1999
- Preceded by: Alnur Mussayev
- Succeeded by: Alnur Mussayev

Ambassador of Kazakhstan to Russia
- In office 12 February 2007 – 14 October 2008
- President: Nursultan Nazarbayev
- Preceded by: Zhanseit Tuymenbayev
- Succeeded by: Adilbek Zhaksybekov

Ambassador of Kazakhstan to Sweden
- In office 2 April 1996 – 7 September 1996
- President: Nursultan Nazarbayev
- Preceded by: Office established
- Succeeded by: Kanat Saudabayev

Ambassador of Kazakhstan to Norway
- In office 2 April 1996 – 7 September 1996
- President: Nursultan Nazarbayev
- Preceded by: Office established
- Succeeded by: Kanat Saudabayev

Ambassador of Kazakhstan to Ireland
- In office 2 April 1996 – 7 September 1996
- President: Nursultan Nazarbayev
- Preceded by: Office established
- Succeeded by: Erlan Idrissov (2002)

Ambassador of Kazakhstan to the United Kingdom
- In office 9 November 1995 – 7 September 1996
- President: Nursultan Nazarbayev
- Preceded by: Office established
- Succeeded by: Kanat Saudabayev

Personal details
- Born: 15 May 1947 (age 79) Dzhambul, Dzhambul Oblast, Kazakh SSR, Soviet Union
- Party: QKP (1976–1991)
- Spouse: Rimma Abykayeva
- Children: 3
- Education: Ural State Technical University; Almaty Higher Party School; Russian Presidential Academy of National Economy and Public Administration

Military service
- Allegiance: Soviet Union (1970–1972); Kazakhstan (1998–present)
- Branch/service: Armed Forces of Kazakhstan
- Years of service: 1998–present
- Rank: Major general

Nūrtai Äbıqaiūly Äbıqaev (Note: Often transliterated as Nurtai Abykayevich Abykayev through a Russified Romanization of Нуртай Абыкаевич Абыкаев.) (Kazakh: Нұртай Әбіқайұлы Әбіқаев; born 15 May 1947) is a Kazakh politician who was the chairman of the National Security Committee of Kazakhstan from August 2010 to December 2015 and from September 1998 to August 1999.

Previously he was Ambassador of Kazakhstan to Russia and before this chair of the Senate of Kazakhstan from 2004 to 2007. He is a long-time friend and assistant to President Nursultan Nazarbayev, and is viewed as the leader of one of the political "clans" that make up Kazakhstan's elite.

== Biography ==
=== Early life and career ===
Abykayev was born in the village of Jambyl in Almaty Region. He studied at the Ural Polytechnic Institute, graduating in 1970. This was followed by two years in the Soviet Red Army, after which Abykayev worked as an engineer in a heavy-machinery factory in Almaty (then Alma-Ata) until 1976.

=== Political career ===
Throughout the 1980s, Abykayev worked his way up the hierarchy of the Communist Party of Kazakhstan, eventually becoming Nazarbayev's aide. After independence he served throughout the presidential administration until he was named Ambassador to the United Kingdom on 9 November 1995. He returned to Kazakhstan the next year, and later became the head of the National Security Committee.

On 9 August 1999, Abykayev was dismissed from his post as chairman of the National Security Committee for his role in a scandal over the sale of old MiG fighter planes to North Korea by the Kazakhstan Ministry of Defense. Several members of his staff were arrested for their direct involvement in formulating the trade.

Abykayev's absence from government did not last long. By April 2000, he had been appointed deputy foreign minister. He was then named head of the Presidential Administration on 29 January 2002.

Abykayev became chair of the Senate on 10 March 2004 where he was re-elected on 1 December 2005. In a large political shake-up in January 2007, Abykayev was replaced by Kassym-Jomart Tokayev, later being appointed as the Kazakhstan Ambassador to Russia.

On 23 August 2010, he was appointed again as the head of the National Security Committee, replacing Adil Shayakhmetov. Shayakhmetov was removed from his post in the aftermath of the arrest of Prosecutor General's Office official Murat Musabekov, who was fingered as allegedly plotting a coup in an anonymous letter allegedly circulated by NSC officers.

Abykayev also serves as the Secretariat head of the Congress of Leaders of World and Traditional Religions, a meeting of world religious leaders organized by President Nazarbayev in Astana.

There has been speculation that Abykayev was involved in the murder of Altynbek Sarsenbayuly, however several other high-profile politicians, including Nazarbayev, have also been accused of the murder at some point.

== Personal life ==
Abykayev is married. He has five children: Marat, Sergey, Aliya, Nuray and Amina; and three grandchildren.
