= Aksu, Aksu District =

Aksu Ақсу
- Village
- Location in Kazakhstan Aksu (Asia)
- Coordinates: 45°36′31″N 79°27′43″E
- Country: Kazakhstan
- Region: Jetisu Region
- District: Aksu District

Population (2009)
  - Total: 892
- Time zone: UTC+6 (Omsk Time)
- Postal code: 040101
- Area code: 72832

Aksu (Kazakh: Ақсу, Aqsu) is a village in Jetisu Region of southeastern Kazakhstan. It is located directly north of Zhansugirov.
