= Asqar Şäkirov =

Kazakh politician

- Асқар Шәкіров
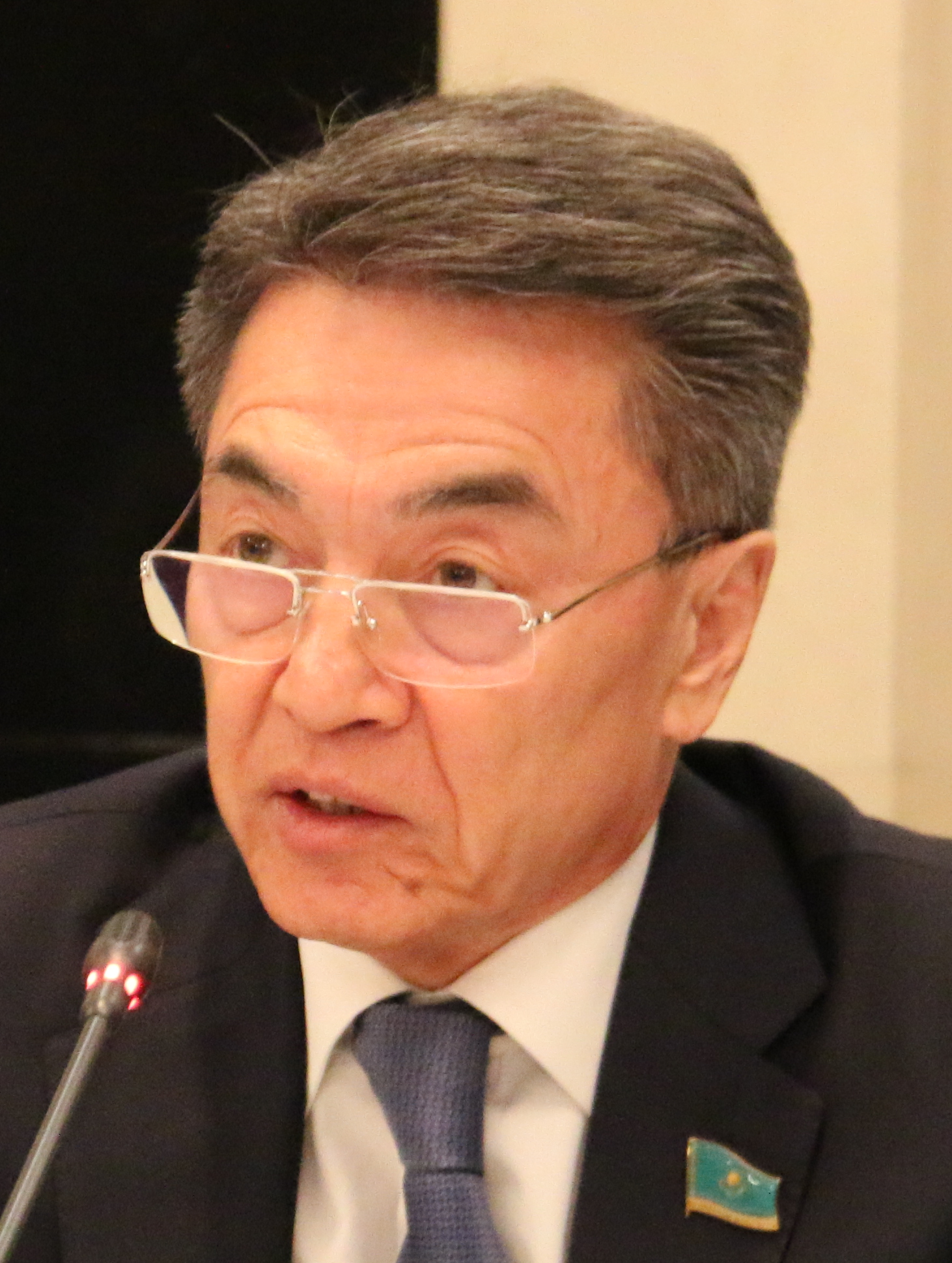
- Şäkirov in 2023

Deputy Chairman of the Senate
- In office 2 September 2019 – 24 January 2023 Serving with Bektas Beknazarov, Nurlan Äbdirov
- Chairman: Dariga Nazarbayeva; Mäulen Äşimbaev
- Preceded by: Sergey Gromov
- Succeeded by: Jaqyp Asanov

Member of the Senate
- Incumbent
- Assumed office 12 August 2019
- Appointed by: Kassym-Jomart Tokayev

Personal details
- Born: 2 February 1956 (age 70) Karaganda, Kazakh SSR, Soviet Union
- Party: Nur Otan
- Education: Moscow State University

Asqar Orazalyūly Şäkırov (Kazakh: Асқар Оразалыұлы Шәкіров; born 2 February 1956) is a Kazakh politician who served as a Deputy Chair of the Senate of Kazakhstan from 2019 to 2023.

== Biography ==
=== Early life and education ===
Şäkirov was born in the city of Karaganda. He graduated from the Institute of Asian and African Countries at the Moscow State University with a degree in orientalist history in 1978.

=== Career ===
From 1978 to 1987, he was the adjunct, inspector, senior inspector of the Academy of the Ministry of Internal Affairs of the USSR in the group to ensure the work of the Soviet Representative in the UN Committee on Combating Crime and Criminal Justice. In 1987, Şäkirov became the assistant at the Foreign Relations Department of the Ministry of Foreign Affairs. From 1992 to 1995, he was the Head of the Contractual and Legal department, deputy head, Head of the Main Contractual and Legal Department of the Kazakhstan Ministry of Foreign Affairs before becoming the Charge d'Affaires of Kazakhstan to South Korea.

In March 1996, Şäkirov became the Ambassador-at-Large of the Ministry of Foreign Affairs until he was appointed as the Deputy Minister of Foreign Affairs. While serving the post, he was the Director of the Asia, Middle East and Africa Department of the Ministry from June 1997. That same year, Şäkirov was appointed as Vice Minister and the Director of the 4th Department of the Ministry of Foreign Affairs. In August 1998, he became the Kazakh Ambassador to India. He was relieved from the post in August 2004 after being appointed as the Deputy Minister of Foreign Affairs.

From February 2006, Şäkirov was the Chairman of the Customs Control Committee of the Ministry of Finance. On 24 September 2007, he was appointed as the Commissioner for Human Rights in the Republic of Kazakhstan.

On 12 August 2019, by the decree of President Kassym-Jomart Tokayev, Şäkirov became a member of the Senate of Kazakhstan where he on 2 September 2019 was elected as the Deputy Chair of the Senate. On 2 July 2020, Şäkirov was awarded the diplomatic rank of Ambassador Extraordinary and Plenipotentiary.
