= Mäulen Äşimbaev =

Kazakh politician (born 1971)

- Мәулен Әшімбаев
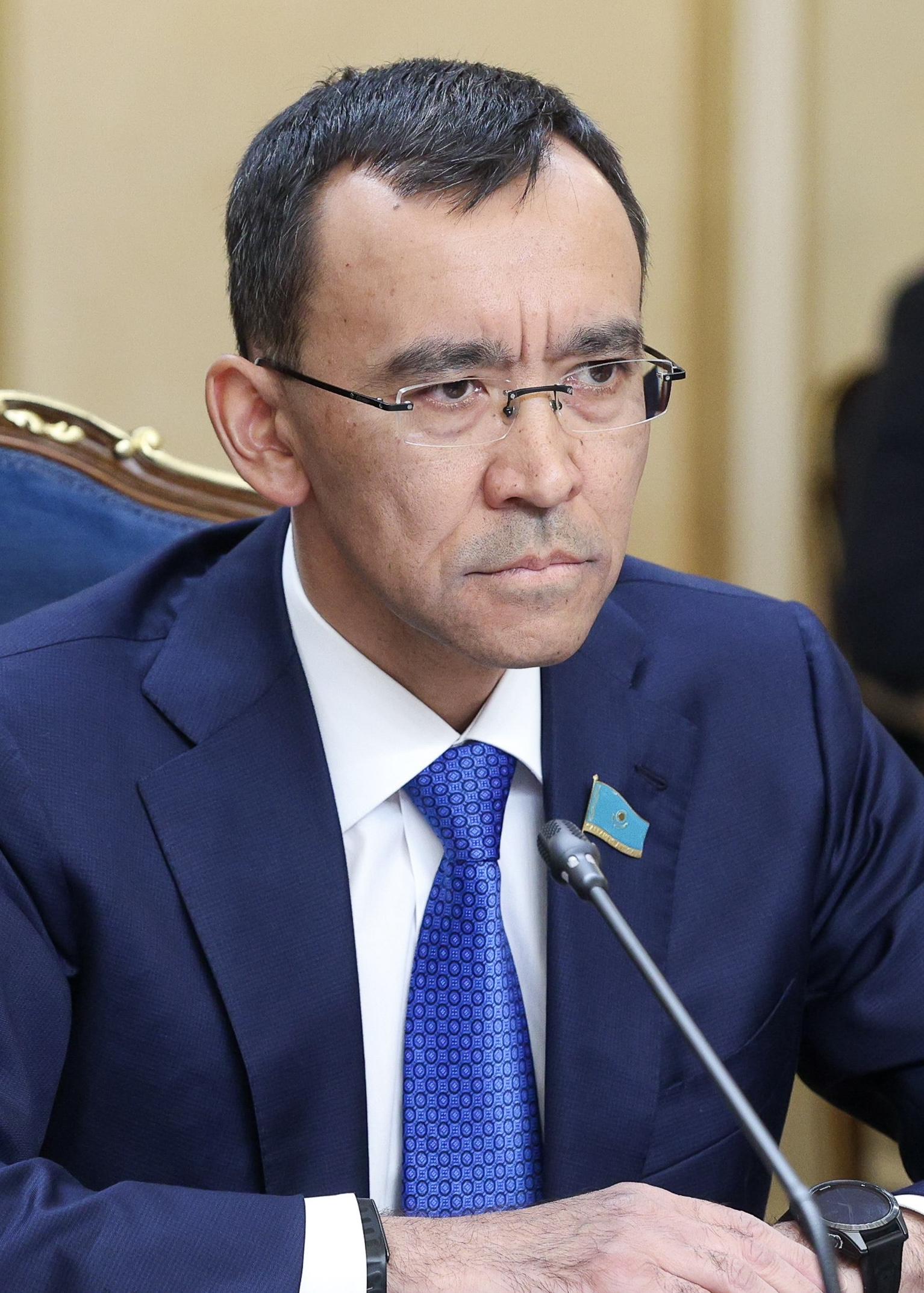
- Äşimbaev in 2026

8th Chairman of the Senate
- In office 4 May 2020 – 1 July 2026
- Deputy: See list: Bektas Beknazarov (2016–20); Asqar Şäkirov (2019–2023); Nurlan Äbdirov (2020–2022); Olga Perepechina (2022–2026); Jaqyp Asanov (2023–2026)
- Preceded by: Dariga Nazarbayeva
- Succeeded by: Office abolished

First Deputy Head of the Presidential Administration of Kazakhstan
- In office 18 December 2019 – 4 May 2020
- President: Kassym-Jomart Tokayev
- Preceded by: Darhan Kaletaev
- Succeeded by: Dauren Abaev

Member of the Senate
- In office 4 May 2020 – 1 July 2026
- Appointed by: Kassym-Jomart Tokayev
- Succeeded by: Office abolished

Member of the Mäjilis
- In office 15 January 2012 – 1 February 2018

First Deputy Chairman of Nur Otan
- In office 1 February 2018 – 29 June 2019
- Preceded by: Mukhtar Kul-Mukhammed
- Succeeded by: Bauyrjan Baibek

Personal details
- Born: 28 January 1971 (age 55) Alma-Ata, Kazakh SSR, Soviet Union
- Party: Amanat
- Spouse: Aigül Böteeva
- Children: 3
- Education: Al-Farabi Kazakh National University; Johns Hopkins University; Tufts University

Mäulen Sağathanūly Äşımbaev (Note: Often transliterated as Maulen Sagatkhanovich Ashimbayev through a Russified Romanization of Маулен Сагахтанович Ашимбаев.) (Kazakh: Мәулен Сағатханұлы Әшімбаев, [mæwˈlʲen sɑʁɑtˌχɑnʊˈɫɤ æʃɘmˈbɑjɪf], born 28 January 1971) is a Kazakh politician who is served as a member and the chairman of the Senate of Kazakhstan from 2020 to 2026. Äşımbaev was the Senate's last chairman. He served as the First Deputy Head of the Presidential Administration from 2019 to 2020, Assistant to the President of Kazakhstan in 2019, First Deputy Chairman of Nur Otan from 2018 to 2019 and member of the Mäjilis from 2016 to 2018.

== Early life and education ==
Born in Alma-Ata in 1971, Äşımbaev graduated from the Al-Farabi Kazakh National University with a degree in economics and was a professor in Political Economy. In 2001, he earned a candidate in Political Sciences with his thesis Political Transit in Kazakhstan in the Context of Global Democratization Processes.

In 2003, Äşımbaev studied at the Paul H. Nitze School of Advanced International Studies of the Johns Hopkins University in Baltimore, where he earned a scientific internship.

From 2015 to 2016, he attended the Fletcher School of Law and Diplomacy of the Tufts University in Medford, Massachusetts, earning a master's degree in international relations.

== Early career ==
From 1993 to 1994, Äşımbaev worked in the system of the Ministry of Press and Mass Media. In 1994, he became the Assistant to the Deputy of the Supreme Council From June to November 1995, Äşımbaev was the consultant to the Apparatus of the Security Council.

From 1995 to 1999, he was a senior expert, sector manager, first deputy head of the Center for Analysis and Strategic Studies of the Presidential Administration of Kazakhstan.

In 1999, Äşımbaev became the Head of the Analytical Center of the Security Council of Kazakhstan.

In 2002, he became the director of the Kazakhstan Institute for Strategic Studies under the President of Kazakhstan.

In May 2005, Äşımbaev was deputy secretary of the Security Council. On 13 April 2006, he became the deputy head of the Presidential Administration of Kazakhstan.

In the 2012 Kazakh legislative election, Äşımbaev was elected as the member of the Mäjilis as chairman of the Committee on International Affairs, Defense and Security. He was reelected again in 2016 and served as the chairman of the Committee on Foreign Affairs, Defense and Security.

== Chairman of the Senate (2020–2026) ==
=== Election and early tenure ===
Äşımbaev was appointed to the Senate of Kazakhstan by presidential decree and unanimously elected Senate Chairman on 4 May 2020, succeeding Dariga Nazarbayeva. He opened his first meeting as chairman, emphasizing post-pandemic recovery and high-quality lawmaking, noting that while the COVID-19 pandemic had stabilized, some restrictions remained and the Senate must ensure legislative continuity while supporting the Kassym-Jomart Tokayev's post-crisis strategy in public health, business, education, and science.

Following the August 2020 Senate elections, he emphasized the importance of "phased and logical" lawmaking, calling for careful committee review, consultation with experts, and open public discussion. He also highlighted the Senate's regional role and cautioned against approving legislation without thorough and in-depth study. Under his leadership, the Senate prioritized economic recovery amidst COVID-19 pandemic, passing 110 laws by December 2020, around 30 of which originated from Senate deputies.

=== Reform and legislative activities ===
Between 2021 and 2022, Äşımbaev focused on institutional reform and legislative strengthening. In January 2021, he addressed mass vaccination, emphasizing public education alongside voluntary vaccination. On 5 June 2022, after a national constitutional referendum, he remarked that the results of the vote demonstrated public support for Tokayev's New Kazakhstan reforms. Later in November 2022, under his chairmanship, the Senate adopted several constitutional laws aimed at strengthening the rule of law, protecting human rights, and clarifying the distribution of powers among institutions and regions.

Äşımbaev was reappointed to the Senate by presidential decree on 24 January 2023, and two days later, on 26 January, he was re-elected as chairman following the 2023 Senate elections, again receiving the support of President Tokayev. During 2023–2024, the Senate passed numerous laws, including constitutional amendments, legal modernization measures, and a new Social Code. In March 2024, Äşımbaev presented legislative priorities to President Tokayev, which included women's rights, child safety, migration, digitalization, and education. He also outlined plans to draft or revise five major codes – Budget, Construction, Water, Tax, and Digital – as well as laws on procurement, media regulation, and heat power. By December 2024, he reported that the Senate adopted 104 laws for the year 2024, with 28 had been passed since September, addressing housing, children's rights, entrepreneurship, and court reform.

=== Domestic and international engagement ===
Throughout his tenure, Aşimbaev has promoted closer cooperation with mäslihats through the Öŋir deputy group, encouraged greater legislative scrutiny, and supported institutional modernization. He has organized events, submitted inquiries to the government, and expanded the Senate's international engagement, including preparations for the Congress of Leaders of World and Traditional Religions.

=== Abolition of the office ===
On July 1, 2026, the post of the Senate's speaker was abolished as part of constitutional reforms that replaced the bicameral parliamentary system with a unicameral Kurultai.

== Personal life ==
Äşımbaev is married to Aigül Bötieva, and they have three children. He speaks Kazakh, Russian, and English, and holds the rank of Major in the reserve. He enjoys reading, skiing, and watching films, and has cited authors such as Abai Qunanbaiuly, Ernest Hemingway, Haruki Murakami, the Strugatsky brothers, and Yuval Noah Harari among his literary interests. Äşımbaev holds a Candidate of Political Sciences degree and has published research on geopolitical and security issues in Central Asia.

== Honours ==
- Certificate of Merit of the Republic of Kazakhstan (2001)
- Order of Kurmet (2007)
- Order of Parasat (3 December 2015)
- Order of the Leopard, 2nd degree (13 December 2021)

== Works ==
Author of more than 100 studies, scientific papers, articles, interviews and speeches at various forums:

- 2001: Political Transition in Kazakhstan: the Content of the Process and Its Features
- 2002: Modern Terrorism: A View from Central Asia (co-author)
- 2002: Security of Kazakhstan at the Present Stage
- 2002: Political Transit: From the Global to the National Dimension
- 2002: Central Asia before and after September 11: geopolitics and security (co-author);
- 2002: Oil and Gas Resources of Kazakhstan in the System of World and Regional Relations (co-author);
- 2003: Military-political alignment of forces in the Caspian-Central Asian region (co-author).
