= 2023 Kazakh Senate election =

The 2023 Kazakh Senate elections were held on 14 January 2023.

== Electoral system ==
Out of the 50 members of the Senate of Kazakhstan, 40 are indirectly elected for six years by delegates from the 17 provinces and three national cities. They're not elected all at once : twenty are elected every three years, one per 17 province and 3 city (Almaty, Astana, and Shymkent). Senators represent every region and city. The remaining 10 are nominated by the president, among which half on the proposal of the People's Assembly.

Candidates must receive more than 50% of the votes cast to win a seat.

== Results ==
Fifty-five candidates ran in the election.

All twenty seats were elected in the first round, rendering a second round unnecessary. Two women were elected.

Party	Votes	%	Seats	+/–
Independents	2,890	100.00	20	+3
Not up			20	+3
Nominated			10	-5
Total	2,890	100.00	50	+1
Valid votes	2,890	99.62		
Invalid/blank votes	11	0.38		
Total votes	2,901	100.00		
Registered voters/turnout	3,167	91.60		
Source: Registered, Voters
