= Nurlan Äbdirov =

Kazakh politician

- Нұрлан Әбдіров
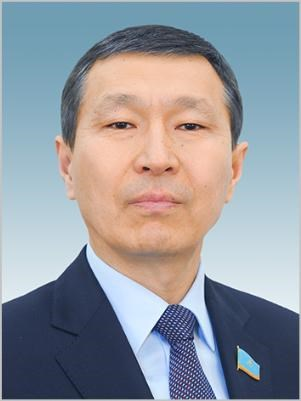
- Official portrait, 2020

11th Chairman of the Central Election Commission
- Incumbent
- Assumed office 25 January 2022
- President: Kassym-Jomart Tokayev
- Preceded by: Berik Imashev

Deputy Chairman of the Senate
- In office 1 September 2020 – 25 January 2022 Serving with Asqar Şäkirov
- Chairman: Mäulen Äşimbaev
- Preceded by: Bektas Beknazarov

Member of the Senate
- In office 28 August 2020 – 25 January 2022
- Appointed by: Kassym-Jomart Tokayev

Member of the Mäjilis
- In office 8 September 2009 – 28 August 2020

Personal details
- Born: 12 January 1961 (age 65) Aqsu-Aiuly, Kazakh SSR, Soviet Union
- Party: Nur Otan
- Spouse: Gülnara Äbdirova
- Children: Margulan, Aigerim
- Education: Karaganda Academy of the Ministry of Internal Affairs of the Republic of Kazakhstan

Nūrlan Mäjitūly Äbdırov (Kazakh: Нұрлан Мәжитұлы Әбдіров; born 12 January 1961) is a Kazakh politician who is the chairman of the Central Election Commission of Kazakhstan. Prior to that, he was the Deputy Chairman of the Senate of Kazakhstan from 2020 to 2022 and a member of the Mäjilis from 2009 to 2020.

== Biography ==
=== Early life and education ===
Nurlan Äbdirov is the son of Majid Abdirov, he was born in the village of Aqsu-Aiuly in the Shet District to a Sunni Muslim Kazakh family. In 1982, he graduated from the Karaganda Academy of the Ministry of Internal Affairs of the Republic of Kazakhstan where he was lecturer there until 1984.

=== Career ===
In 1984, Äbdirov became an Adjunct at the All-Union Scientific Research Institute of the USSR Ministry of Internal Affairs. From 1987 to 1997, he was a lecturer, senior lecturer, associate professor, deputy Head of the Department of Criminal Law and Criminology of the Karaganda Academy of the Ministry of Internal Affairs of the Republic of Kazakhstan. In July 1997, Äbdirov was appointed as a Secretary of the State Commission of Kazakhstan on Drug Control. In May 2000, he became Deputy Chairman of the Agency of Kazakhstan on Combating Drug Addiction and Drug Business and from January 2001, was Deputy Chairman of the Committee on Combating Drug Addiction and Drug Business of the Ministry of Justice.

In September 2002, Äbdirov was appointed as state inspector of the Secretariat of the Security Council of Kazakhstan, until becoming the Head of the Department of Public and Environmental Safety of the Secretariat in September 2004. From April to June 2005, Äbdirov was the Deputy Head of the Secretariat until he was appointed as Deputy Secretary of the Security Council of the Republic of Kazakhstan and the Head of the Secretariat.

On 8 September 2009, Äbdirov became a member of the Mäjilis where he served from March 2016 as a Chairman of the Committee on Legislation and Judicial and Legal Reform.

On 28 August 2020, he was appointed as a member of the Senate of Kazakhstan by President Kassym-Jomart Tokayev. On 1 September 2020, Äbdirov was chosen to be the Deputy Chair of the Senate, succeeding Bektas Beknazarov's role.

On January 25, 2022, by decree of the President of the Republic of Kazakhstan, Kassym-Jomart Tokayev was appointed Chairman of the Central Election Commission of the Republic of Kazakhstan.
