= Chairman of the Senate of Kazakhstan =

Parliamentary head of state

Chairman of the Senate of the Parliament of Kazakhstan
- Қазақстан Парламенті Сенатының төрағасы (Kazakh); председатель Сената Парламента Казахстана (Russian)
- Status: Abolished
- Appointer: Senate of Kazakhstan
- Term length: None
- Precursor: Chairmen of the Supreme Soviet of Kazakhstan
- Inaugural holder: Omirbek Baigeldi
- Formation: 30 January 1996
- Final holder: Mäulen Äşimbaev
- Abolished: 1 July 2026
- Superseded by: Chairman of the Kurultai
- Website: senate.parlam.kz

The chairman of the Senate of the Parliament of the Republic of Kazakhstan (Note: Kazakh: Қазақстан Республикасы Парламенті Сенатының төрағасы; Qazaqstan Respublikasy Parlamentı Senatynyñ törağasy; Russian: председатель Сената Парламента Республики Казахстан; predsedatel' Senata Parlamenta Respubliki Kazakhstan) was a presiding officer of the upper house of the Parliament of Kazakhstan, responsible for opening sessions, preside over regular and extraordinary joint meetings. The post was created on 30 January 1996 at the first newly Senate session opening after the 1995 Kazakh constitutional referendum which was held in 30 August 1995 that formed the Senate of Kazakhstan. The post was abolished on 1 July 2026 following the adoption of a new Constitution that transitioned the country to a unicameral parliament, the Kurultai.

== List of chairmen ==
№	Portrait	Name	Took office	Left office	Duration	President
1		Omirbek Baigeldi (1939–2024)	30 January 1996	29 November 1999	3 years and 9 months	Nursultan Nazarbayev (r. 1991–2019)
2		Oralbay Abdykarimov (born 1947)	1 December 1999	10 March 2004	4 years and 3 months	Nursultan Nazarbayev (r. 1991–2019)
3		Nurtai Abykayev (born 1947)	10 March 2004	11 January 2007	2 years and 10 months	Nursultan Nazarbayev (r. 1991–2019)
4		Kassym-Jomart Tokayev (born 1953)	11 January 2007	15 April 2011	4 years and 3 months	Nursultan Nazarbayev (r. 1991–2019)
5		Kairat Mami (born 1955)	15 April 2011	16 October 2013	2 years and 6 months	Nursultan Nazarbayev (r. 1991–2019)
6		Kassym-Jomart Tokayev (born 1953)	16 October 2013	20 March 2019	5 years and 5 months	Nursultan Nazarbayev (r. 1991–2019)
7		Dariga Nazarbayeva (born 1963)	20 March 2019	2 May 2020	1 year and 1 month	Kassym-Jomart Tokayev (r. 2019– )
8		Mäulen Äşimbaev (born 1971)	4 May 2020	1 July 2026	6 years and 1 month	Kassym-Jomart Tokayev (r. 2019– )

== See also ==
- Chairman of the Mäjilis, former leader of the lower house
- Senate of Kazakhstan, body headed by the Chairman
- Chairman of the Kurultai, succeeding position of the Senate Chairman
