= Senate of Kazakhstan =

Upper house in the Parliament of Kazakhstan

Coordinates: 51.1276°N 71.4419°E

Senate of the Parliament of the Republic of Kazakhstan Қазақстан Республикасы Парламентінің Сенаты (Kazakh)
- 8th Senate
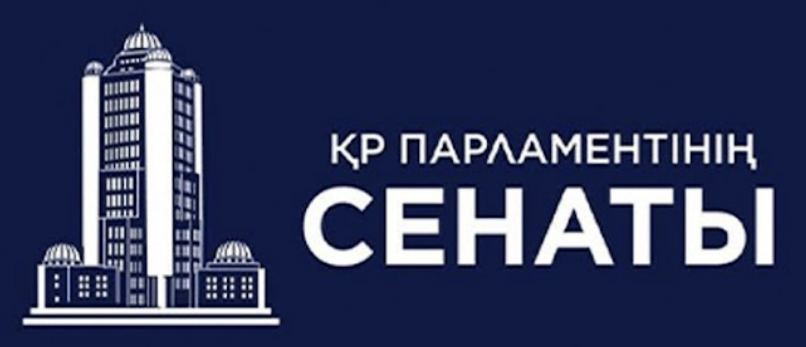

Type
- Type: Upper house of the Parliament of Kazakhstan

History
- Founded: 16 October 1995; 31 years ago
- Disbanded: 1 July 2026; 3 months ago
- Preceded by: Supreme Council
- Succeeded by: Kurultai

Structure
- Seats: 50
- Length of term: 6 years

Elections
- Voting system: 40 seats indirectly elected by the local mäslihats, 10 are appointed by the President
- Last election: 14 January 2023

Meeting place
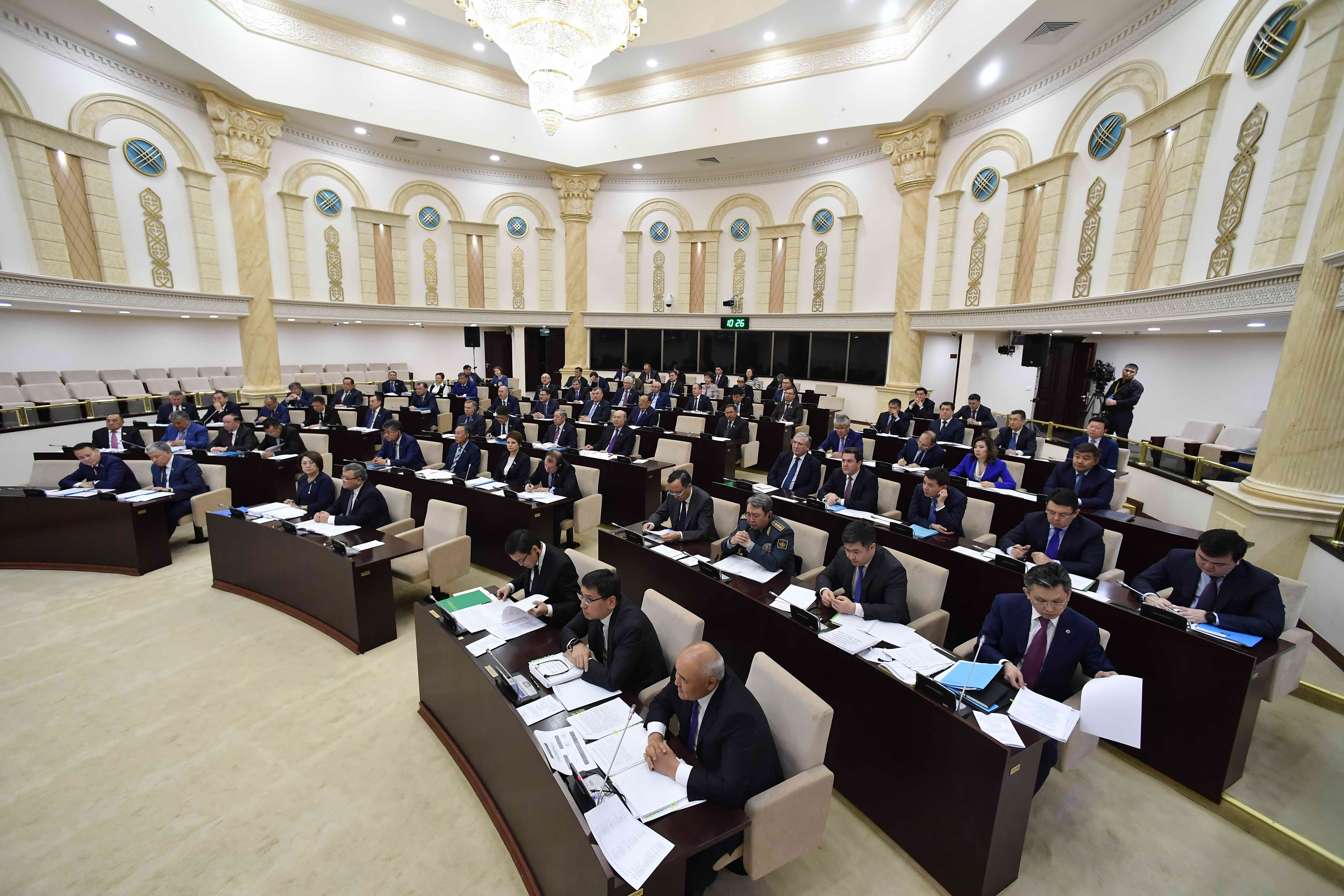
- Astana, Kazakhstan

Website
- http://www.parlam.kz/en/

The Senate of the Parliament of the Republic of Kazakhstan, (Note: Kazakh: Қазақстан Республикасы Парламентінің Сенаты, romanized: Qazaqstan Respublikasy Parlamentynyñ Senaty; Russian: Сенат Парламента Республики Казахстан, romanized: Senat Parlamenta Respubliki Kazahstan) simply referred to as the Senate, was the upper house of two chambers in the Parliament of Kazakhstan. The Senate was composed of elected members: two from each region and two from three municipalities which are Almaty, Astana, and Shymkent.

Deputies of the Senate were elected through indirect suffrage by secret ballot. Local legislative bodies (mäslihats) elect senators, while half of the elected members are up for re-election every three years, ensuring continuous turnover while maintaining institutional stability. Additionally, ten members of the Senate were appointed by the president of Kazakhstan, ensuring that various national, cultural, and professional communities are adequately represented.

The Senate served as a check on the legislative process, with a key responsibility of reviewing and amending laws passed by the Mäjilis, the lower house of Parliament. It also plays an important role in approving presidential appointments to high government positions, such as judges, the prosecutor general, and members of the Constitutional Court. The Senate also had authority over certain presidential decrees, particularly those related to military force, the declaration of a state of emergency, and other matters affecting national security and governance.

Senators served six-year terms, contributing to a more stable and long-term approach to legislative oversight and policy-making. In addition to its legislative functions, the Senate also represented the interests of Kazakhstan's regions, providing a platform for local concerns and perspectives within the national legislative framework. This dual approach—through direct elections and presidential appointments—ensures a balanced representation of both regional and national interests within Kazakhstan's political system.

== History ==
The Senate of Kazakhstan was established shortly after the 1995 Kazakh constitutional referendum held on 30 August 1995 where voters approved of a new draft of the Constitution that formed a bicameral Parliament which included the upper house Senate in Kazakhstan for the first time. According to the Constitution, the term of office of the senators of the 1st convocation was four years, while half of the senators were re-elected every two years. In the aftermath of the elections held on 5 December 1995, 40 senators were elected in which 2 each from 19 regions and the capital of Kazakhstan which at that time was Almaty from the mäslihats (local legislatures) members and 7 senators were appointed by President Nursultan Nazarbayev. The Senate convened in first session on 30 January 1996.

On 8 October 1997, elections for four-year-term senators were held in connection with the end of the term of office of the senators who were elected for two years. After the past administrative reform and optimization of regions, 15 senators were elected which were held in 14 regions and in Almaty. In aftermath of Akmola being declared as the new capital of Kazakhstan, elections for senators were held on 11 February 1998 from the city.

On 7 October 1998, amendments to the Constitution of Kazakhstan were adopted, according to which the term of office of a senator was increased to six years, while the other half of the senators were to be every three years. In connection with the end of the term of office of the senators who were elected in 1995 for a four-year term, reelections took place on 17 September 1999, where the senators were elected for 6 year term. The senators elected in 1997 continued serving in the 2nd convocation until December 2002.

On 21 May 2007, amendments to the Constitution of Kazakhstan were adopted. The number of senators appointed by the president of Kazakhstan increased from 7 to 15. On 29 August 2007, by a presidential decree, 8 new senators were appointed, thus the number of seats in the Senate increased from 39 to 47.

In June 2018, the city of Shymkent became a municipality, which led to a Senate election in the City Mäslihat on 5 October 2018. As a result, the number of senate seats was increased from 47 to 49.

In May 2019, the status of "Honorary Senator" was established, which was awarded to the first president of Kazakhstan, Nursultan Nazarbayev, for "his outstanding contribution to the formation of the constitutional and legal foundations of the Republic of Kazakhstan as a democratic, secular, legal and social state, as well as to the formation and development of domestic parliamentarianism."

On 15 March 2026, a constitutional referendum was held in Kazakhstan and approved by 89% of voters. As a result of this, the Senate will be abolished and replaced with a unicameral body known as the Kurultai. These changes will come into effect on 1 July 2026.

== Electoral system ==
Out of the 50 members of the Senate of Kazakhstan, 40 are indirectly elected for six years by delegates from the 17 provinces and three national cities. They are not elected all at once: twenty are elected every three years, one per province and city. Senators represent every region and city. The remaining 10 are nominated by the president, among which half on the proposal of the People's Assembly.

== Powers of the Senate ==
=== Joint sessions of Senate and Mäjilis ===
According to the Constitution and the Constitutional law "On the Parliament of the Republic of Kazakhstan" the Parliament at joint sessions of the Chambers shall:

- make amendments and additions to the Constitution at the proposal of President of the Republic of Kazakhstan;
- approve the reports of the Government and the Accounts Committee on implementation of the republican budget. If the parliament doesn't approve Government's report on implementation of the republican budget, it means a motion of no-confidence vote by the Parliament against the Government;
- have the right to delegate legislative powers for a term not exceeding one year to the President by two-thirds of the votes from the total number of deputies of each Chamber at the initiative of the President;
- decide issues of war and peace;
- adopt decisions concerning the use of the Armed Forces of the Republic to fulfill international obligations in support of peace and security at the proposal of the President of the Republic;
- hear annual messages of the Constitutional Council of the Republic on the state of the constitutional legality in the Republic;
- form joint commissions of the Chambers; elect and release from office their chairpersons; hear report on the activity of the commissions;
- exercise other powers assigned to Parliament by the Constitution.

=== Separate sessions of Senate and Mäjilis ===
Parliament at separate sessions of the Chambers through consecutive consideration of issues first in the Mäjilis and then in the Senate shall adopt constitutional laws and laws, and shall:

- approve the budget of the republic, make amendments and additions;
- establish and remove state fees and taxes;
- establish the procedure dealing with the issues of administrative-territorial division of Kazakhstan;
- institute state awards, honorary, military and other titles, ranked positions, diplomatic ranks of the Republic of Kazakhstan, and define state symbols of the Republic;
- decide issues of state loans and rendering of economic and other assistance by the Republic;
- issue acts of amnesty to citizens;
- ratify and denounce international treaties of the Republic.

Also shall:

- discuss reports on implementation of the budget of the republic;
- conduct second round of discussions and voting on bills and separate articles that were subject to President's objection;
- put forward an initiative calling for national referendum.

=== Exclusive powers of the Senate of Parliament ===
The following shall belong to exclusive jurisdiction of the Senate:

- election and discharge from office of the Chairperson of the Supreme Court and judges of the Supreme Court of the Republic at the proposal of the President of the Republic of Kazakhstan and swearing them into office;
- approval of the appointment of the Prosecutor General and the Chairperson of the Committee of National Security by the President of the Republic of Kazakhstan;
- assuming all the functions of the Parliament of the Republic in adopting constitutional laws and laws in the period of temporary absence of the Mäjilis following its early dissolution (On two occasions the Senate assumed all the functions of the Parliament in adopting constitutional laws and laws: from June 21 till July 11, 2007, and from November 16, 2011 till January 19, 2012);
- Exercise other powers assigned to the Senate of the Parliament by the Constitution.

=== Special authorities of the Senate of Parliament ===
Each Chamber independently without participation of another Chamber shall:

- appoint two members of the Constitutional Council; appoint two members for a five-year term to the Central Election Commission and three members of the Accounts Committee for control over implementation of the republican budget;
- terminate powers of members of the Chambers;
- hold Parliamentary hearings on the issues of within its jurisdiction;
- hear reports of members of the Government of the Republic on the issues of their activities;
- set up coordinating and working bodies of the Chambers;
- adopt the rules of its activities and other decisions on the issues related to organization and internal procedures of the Chambers.

== Leadership ==
=== Chairman of the Senate ===
The Chairman of the Senate is a person elected by the Senate among the deputies by a secret ballot. The candidature on the post of the chair is nominated by the president of Kazakhstan.

Mäulen Äşimbaev is the current chairman of the Senate.

=== Deputy Chairman of the Senate ===
The Senate Chairman has two deputy chairs who carry out tasks that are made by the chair. The deputy chairs are elected by the Senate MPs who are nominated by the chair.

There are two deputy chairs of the Senate, currently Asqar Şäkirov and Nurlan Äbdirov.

== Rights, requirements, and responsibilities of senators ==
A member of the Parliament must be a citizen of the Republic of Kazakhstan who has been a permanent resident on its territory over the last ten years.

To hold office, senators have to be at least 30 years of age with higher education and five years of work experience, permanently residing on the territory of the particular region, city of republican significance or the capital of the republic for at least three years.

Powers of a member of the Parliament commence from the moment of his/her registration as a member of the Parliament by the Central Election Commission of the Republic.

At the first session of Parliament at joint session of its Chambers MPs take oath to the people of Kazakhstan: "I do solemnly swear to truly serve the people of Kazakhstan, to strengthen integrity and independence of the Republic of Kazakhstan, to abide strictly by its Constitution and laws, to carry out honestly the high duties of a deputy assigned to me".

Administration of the oath is done by the president at a ceremony in the presence of members of the Government, the Constitutional Council, judges of the Supreme Court, ex-presidents of the republic.

Senators, along with all other MPs, must participate in the work of the Parliament and its bodies; they may only vote in person.

Member of the Senate exercises the right of a decisive vote on all issues considered at sessions of Parliament and its bodies of which he or she is a member.

Senators have the rights to:

- elect and be elected to working bodies of the Parliament and the Senate;
- make proposals and comments concerning the session agenda, the procedure and content of discussed issues;
- express opinion on nominations elected or appointed by the Senate of Parliament or consent to the appointments made by the Parliament and the Senate;
- submit proposals to Bureau of the Chamber regarding issues at a joint session of the Chambers of the Parliament and at a Senate session of the Parliament and if his/her proposals are turned down - submit them for the Senate's consideration;
- submit issues for consideration at gatherings of working bodies of the Parliament and of the Senate of Parliament;
- propose to hold a hearing by the officials accountable to Chambers of Parliament at a joint session of Parliament;
- make deputy inquiries in the order established by the law;
- participate in debates, to make queries to speakers, and also to the chairperson;
- present arguments upon his/her voting in favor of certain amendments and share information;
- make amendments to draft bills, resolutions, other decrees accepted by Parliament;
- inform members of Parliament about appeals of public significance from citizens;
- see texts of deputy speeches in shorthand reports and minutes of Parliament's session;
- request information and documents necessary for his/her activity from state bodies and officials; state bodies and officials should provide MPs with requested documents and materials with consideration of secrets protected by law;
- exercise other powers according to the present Constitutional Law of the Republic of Kazakhstan "On the Parliament of the Republic of Kazakhstan and the status of MPs", rules of Parliament and of its Chambers.

== Parliamentary activities ==
Standing committees of the Senate within the scope of their competence are free to choose forms and methods of activity, interact with state bodies and public unions, examine and take into account public opinion, hold parliamentary hearings, government hours, conferences, round tables, meetings, presentations and other parliamentary events.

Committees of the Senate hold visiting sessions across regions in order to examine public opinion on bills under consideration by the Parliament and other pressing issues.

MPs visit for their or other regions quarterly and meet with different groups of people, get acquainted with the situation on the fields, answer citizens' questions, comment on major provisions of laws adopted by the Parliament.

=== Standing committees ===
- Committee on Constitutional Legislation, Judicial System and Law Enforcement Bodies
- Committee on Finance and Budget
- Committee on International Relations, Defense and Security
- Committee on Economic Development and Entrepreneurship
- Committee on Social and Culture Development and Science
- Committee on Exploitation of Natural Resources and Development of Rural Areas

== Deputies' inquiries and questions ==
Deputies' inquiry is an official request addressed at a joint and separate sessions of the Chambers of the Parliament to state officials to obtain information on specific matters related to the competence of this body or an official.

Deputies of the Senate have the right to make an inquiry to the prime minister and the Government, chairman of the National Bank, chairman and members of the Central Election Commission, prosecutor general, chairman of the National Security Committee, chairman and members of the Accounts committee for control over execution of the republican budget.

Up to now members of the Senate have made more than thousand inquiries on various issues of state and public life.

== Senate's international activities ==
Parliament's involvement in international activity of Kazakhstan and engagement of MPs in identifying and implementing foreign policy of our country has significantly increased.

Senators actively participate in the work of such inter-parliamentary organizations as Inter-parliamentary Assembly of Member States of the Commonwealth of Independent States, Inter-parliamentary Assembly of the Eurasian Economic Community, Parliamentary Assemblies of CSTO, OSCE Parliamentary Assembly, Interparliamentary Union, European Parliament, Parliamentary Assembly of the Council of Europe, Parliamentary Assembly of NATO, Turk PA.

Senate of the Parliament makes a significant contribution to the activity of inter-parliamentary organizations and promotion of inter-parliamentary dialogue, enhancing integration of Kazakhstan into the world community, increase its role and capacity to shape decision making process in line with their national interests.

Involvement of the Senate of the Parliament in international parliamentary organizations:

- Parliamentary Assembly of the Organization for Security and Cooperation in Europe (OSCE PA)
- Parliamentary Assembly of the Council of Europe (PACE)
- Inter-parliamentary Union (IPU)
- Parliamentary Assembly of the North-Atlantic Treaty Organization (NATO PA)
- Inter-parliamentary Assembly of Member States of the Commonwealth of Independent States (IPA CIS)
- Inter-parliamentary Assembly of the Eurasian Economic Community (IPA EurAsEC)
- Parliamentary Assembly of the Collective Security Treaty Organization (PA CSTO)
- Parliamentary Union of the Organization of Islamic Cooperation (OIC PU)
- Asian Forum of Parliamentarians on Population and Development (AFPPD)
- Asian Parliamentary Assembly (APA)
- Parliamentary Assembly of Turkic-Speaking Countries (TurkPA)
- Committee of Parliamentary Cooperation "Republic of Kazakhstan – European Union" (CPC RK-EU)
- The Senate has formed 1 commission and 44 friendship groups with parliaments of other countries.
