= 6th Parliament of Kazakhstan =

Parliament of the Republic of Kazakhstan of the 6th convocation
←	5th Parliament of Kazakhstan	7th Parliament of Kazakhstan	→

Overview
- Legislative body: Parliament of Kazakhstan
- Meeting place: Parliament Building; Astana, Kazakhstan
- Term: 25 March 2016 – 30 December 2020
- Election: 20 March 2016

Senate
- Members: 49
- Chairman: Kassym-Jomart Tokayev; Dariga Nazarbayeva; Mäulen Äşimbaev
- Deputy Chairmen: Sergey Gromov; Asqar Beisenbaev; Asqar Şäkirov; Nurlan Äbdirov
- Party control: Nonpartisan (49)

Mäjilis
- Members: 107
- Chair: Baktykozha Izmukhambetov; Nurlan Nigmatulin
- Deputy Chair: Vladimir Bozhko; Gülmira Esimbaeva
- Party control: Nur Otan (84)

Sessions
- 1st: 25 March 2016 – 30 June 2016
- 2nd: 1 September 2016 – 30 June 2017
- 3rd: 4 September 2017 – 29 June 2018
- 4th: 1 September 2018 – 5 July 2019
- 5th: 2 September 2019 – 30 June 2020
- 6th: 1 September 2020 – 14 January 2021

The Parliament of the Republic of Kazakhstan of the 6th convocation (Kazakh: Алтыншы шақырылған Қазақстан Республикасы Парламенті, romanized: Altynşy şaqyrylğan Qazaqstan Respublikasy Parlamentı; Russian: Парламент Республики Казахстан шестого созыва) was the legislative term of the Parliament of Kazakhstan.

The convocation was formed shortly after the 2016 Kazakh legislative election where 98 deputies of the lower house Mäjilis were elected based on the party list through proportional representation, while the 9 seats are reserved to the indirectly elected members of the Assembly of People. The legislative term of the Mäjilis ended on 30 December 2020 while the convention for deputies of the Senate of Kazakhstan continued until 14 January 2021.

== 6th Mäjilis ==
=== Structure ===
Office	MP	Term	Party
Chair	Baktykozha Izmukhambetov	25 March 2016 — 21 June 2016	Nur Otan
Chair	Nurlan Nigmatulin	22 June 2016 — 30 December 2020	Nur Otan
Deputy Chair	Vladimir Bozhko	25 March 2016 — 30 December 2020	Assembly of People
Deputy Chair	Gülmira Esimbaeva	25 March 2016 — 30 December 2020	Nur Otan
Faction leaders	Gülmira Esimbaeva	25 March 2016 — 22 August 2019	Nur Otan
Faction leaders	Nurlan Nigmatulin	22 August 2019 — 30 December 2020	Nur Otan
Faction leaders	Azat Peruashev	25 March 2016 — 30 December 2020	Ak Zhol
Faction leaders	Vladislav Kosarev	25 March 2016 — 17 September 2018	QKHP
Faction leaders	Aiqyn Qongyrov	17 September 2018 — 30 December 2020	QHP

=== Members ===
Party	Name	Faction	Term of office
Nur Otan	Maira Aisina	Nur Otan	25 March 2016 – 30 December 2020
Nur Otan	Nūrlan Älımjanov	Nur Otan	4 September 2019 – 30 December 2020
Nur Otan	Nūrjan Ältaev	Nur Otan	12 February 2019 – 30 November 2020
Nur Otan	Zäureş Amanjolova	Nur Otan	25 March 2016 – 30 December 2020
Nur Otan	Irina Aronova	Nur Otan	25 March 2016 – 30 December 2020
Nur Otan	Nūrjan Äşımbetov	Nur Otan	20 August 2019 – 30 December 2020
People's Party of Kazakhstan	Jambyl Ahmetbekov	People's Party of Kazakhstan	25 March 2016 – 30 December 2020
Nur Otan	Sapar Ahmetov	Nur Otan	25 March 2016 – 30 December 2020
Nur Otan	Baqytjan Äbdıraiym	Nur Otan	25 Match 2016 – 29 November 2017
Nur Otan	Nurlan Äbdirov	Nur Otan	25 March 2016 – 28 August 2020
Assembly of People	Sauytbek Abdrahmanov	Assembly of People	25 March 2016 – 30 December 2020
Nur Otan	Gulshara Abdykhalikova	Nur Otan	16 August 2019 – 27 March 2020
Ak Zhol Democratic Party	Keŋes Absatirov	Ak Zhol Democratic Party	25 March 2016 – 30 December 2020
Nur Otan	Mäulen Äşimbaev	Nur Otan	25 March 2016 – 1 February 2018
People's Party of Kazakhstan	Galina Baimahanova	People's Party of Kazakhstan	25 March 2016 – 30 December 2020
Nur Otan	Asqar Bazarbaev	Nur Otan	25 March 2016 – 30 December 2020
Nur Otan	Zağipa Balieva	Nur Otan	25 March 2016 – 30 December 2020
Ak Zhol Democratic Party	Erlan Barlybaev	Ak Zhol Democratic Party	25 March 2016 – 30 December 2020
Nur Otan	Äbdımanap Bektūğanov	Nur Otan	25 March 2016 – 30 December 2020
Nur Otan	Ersūltan Bektūğanov	Nur Otan	25 March 2016 – 30 December 2020
Nur Otan	Gülnara Bijanova	Nur Otan	25 March 2016 – 30 December 2020
Nur Otan	Marat Bopazov	Nur Otan	25 March 2016 – 30 December 2020
Assembly of People	Vladimir Bozhko	Assembly of People	25 March 2016 – 30 December 2020
Nur Otan	Svetlana Bychkova	Nur Otan	25 March 2016 – 30 December 2020
Nur Otan	Amangeldı Däurenbaev	Nur Otan	25 March 2016 – 30 December 2020
Nur Otan	Nūrlan Dulatbekov	Nur Otan	25 March 2016 – 2 September 2020
Nur Otan	Jeksenbai Düisebaev	Nur Otan	25 March 2016 – 30 December 2020
Nur Otan	Sergey Dyachenko	Nur Otan	25 March 2016 – 26 October 2016
Ak Zhol Democratic Party	Berık Diusembinov	Ak Zhol Democratic Party	25 March 2016 – 30 December 2020
Nur Otan	Abzal Eraliev	Nur Otan	25 March 2016 – 30 December 2020
Ak Zhol Democratic Party	Dania Espaeva	Ak Zhol Democratic Party	25 March 2016 – 30 December 2020
Nur Otan	Erjan Qūdaibergen	Nur Otan	25 March 2016 – 30 December 2020
Nur Otan	Mūqtar Erman	Nur Otan	25 March 2016 – 30 December 2020
Nur Otan	Bakhytzhan Ertaev	Nur Otan	25 March 2016 – 30 December 2020
Nur Otan	Qojahan Jabagiev	Nur Otan	25 March 2016 – 30 December 2020
Nur Otan	Anar Jailğanova	Nur Otan	25 March 2016 – 14 June 2019
Nur Otan	Kabibulla Dzhakupov	Nur Otan	25 March 2016 – 30 December 2020
Nur Otan	Amanjan Jamalov	Nur Otan	25 March 2016 – 30 December 2020
Nur Otan	Janat Jarasov	Nur Otan	25 March 2016 – 30 December 2020
Nur Otan	Baidılda Jilkişiev	Nur Otan	25 March 2016 – 30 December 2020
Assembly of People	Natalia Jūmadildaeva	Assembly of People	25 March 2016 – 30 December 2020
Nur Otan	Sergey Zvolsky	Nur Otan	25 March 2016 – 30 December 2020
Nur Otan	Gülnar Yqsanova	Nur Otan	25 March 2016 – 29 August 2019
Nur Otan	Snejanna İmaşeva	Nur Otan	25 March 2016 – 30 December 2020
Nur Otan	Gülmira Esimbaeva	Nur Otan	25 March 2016 – 30 December 2020
Nur Otan	Pavel Kazantsev	Nur Otan	25 March 2016 – 30 December 2020
Nur Otan	Balaim Kesebaeva	Nur Otan	25 March 2016 – 30 December 2020
Nur Otan	Ivan Klimenko	Nur Otan	25 March 2016 – 30 December 2020
People's Party of Kazakhstan	Vladislav Kosarev	People's Party of Kazakhstan	25 March 2016 – 30 December 2020
Nur Otan	Evgeny Kozlov	Nur Otan	25 March 2016 – 30 December 2020
Nur Otan	Uälihan Qainazarov	Nur Otan	25 March 2016 – 30 December 2020
Nur Otan	Säken Qanybekov	Nur Otan	25 March 2016 – 30 December 2020
Nur Otan	Qūralai Qaraken	Nur Otan	25 March 2016 – 30 December 2020
Nur Otan	Gulzhan Karagusova	Nur Otan	25 March 2016 – 30 December 2020
Nur Otan	Fahriddin Qarataev	Nur Otan	25 March 2016 – 30 December 2020
Ak Zhol Democratic Party	Meruert Qazbekova	Ak Zhol Democratic Party	25 March 2016 – 30 December 2020
People's Party of Kazakhstan	Aiqyn Qongyrov	People's Party of Kazakhstan	25 March 2016 – 30 December 2020
Nur Otan	Arman Qojahmetov	Nur Otan	25 March 2016 – 30 December 2020
Nur Otan	Aizada Qūrmanova	Nur Otan	25 March 2016 – 14 July 2020
Nur Otan	Serik Qūsaiynov	Nur Otan	25 March 2016 – 30 December 2020
People's Party of Kazakhstan	Magerram Magerramov	People's Party of Kazakhstan	25 March 2016 – 30 December 2020
Nur Otan	Beibıt Mamyraev	Nur Otan	25 March 2016 – 30 December 2020
Assembly of People	Narine Mikaelyan	Assembly of People	25 March 2016 – 30 December 2020
Assembly of People	Ahmet Muradov	Assembly of People	25 March 2016 – 30 December 2020
Nur Otan	Mahambetov Mansurhan	Nur Otan	25 March 2016 – 30 December 2020
Nur Otan	Darhan Myŋbai	Nur Otan	13 February 2018 – 30 December 2020
Nur Otan	Mäken Baqtiar	Nur Otan	25 March 2016 – 13 August 2019
Nur Otan	Qanat Musin	Nur Otan	25 March 2016 – 30 December 2020
Nur Otan	Mūsyrman İmanjanūly	Nur Otan	25 March 2016 – 30 December 2020
Nur Otan	Nurlan Nigmatulin	Nur Otan	21 June 2016 – 30 December 2020
Ak Zhol Democratic Party	Ekaterina Nikitinskaya	Ak Zhol Democratic Party	25 March 2016 – 30 December 2020
Nur Otan	Aigül Nurkina	Nur Otan	25 March 2016 – 30 December 2020
Nur Otan	Djamilia Nurmanbetova	Nur Otan	25 March 2016 – 30 December 2020
Assembly of People	Şaimardan Nurumov	Assembly of People	25 March 2016 – 30 December 2020
Nur Otan	Vasily Oleinik	Nur Otan	25 March 2016 – 30 December 2020
Nur Otan	Janat Omarbekova	Nur Otan	25 March 2016 – 30 December 2020
Nur Otan	Jūldyz Omarbekova	Nur Otan	20 August 2019 – 30 December 2020
Nur Otan	Saparhan Omarov	Nur Otan	25 March 2016 – 25 February 2019
Nur Otan	Berık Ospanov	Nur Otan	25 March 2016 – 30 December 2020
Nur Otan	Omarhan Öksıkbaev	Nur Otan	25 March 2016 – 30 December 2020
Nur Otan	Säken Ötebaev	Nur Otan	25 March 2016 – 30 December 2020
Nur Otan	Şavhat Ötemısov	Nur Otan	25 March 2016 – 30 December 2020
Ak Zhol Democratic Party	Azat Peruashev	Ak Zhol Democratic Party	25 March 2016 – 30 December 2020
Nur Otan	Artur Platonov	Nur Otan	25 March 2016 – 30 December 2020
Nur Otan	Meiram Pşembaev	Nur Otan	25 March 2016 – 30 December 2020
Nur Otan	Albert Rau	Nur Otan	13 March 2017 – 30 December 2020
Nur Otan	Nūrtai Sabilianov	Nur Otan	25 March 2016 – 30 December 2020
Nur Otan	Älia Saparova	Nur Otan	25 March 2016 – 30 December 2020
Nur Otan	Sergey Simonov	Nur Otan	25 March 2016 – 30 December 2020
Nur Otan	Serık Seidumanov	Nur Otan	25 March 2016 – 30 December 2020
Nur Otan	Roman Sklyar	Nur Otan	25 March 2016 – 17 May 2016
Nur Otan	Baqytbek Smağūl	Nur Otan	25 March 2016 – 30 December 2020
Nur Otan	Asylbek Smağūlov	Nur Otan	25 March 2016 – 23 September 2020
People's Party of Kazakhstan	Irina Smirnova	People's Party of Kazakhstan	25 March 2016 – 30 December 2020
Nur Otan	Aleksandr Suslov	Nur Otan	25 March 2016 – 30 December 2020
Nur Otan	Quanyş Sūltanov	Nur Otan	25 March 2016 – 30 December 2020
People's Party of Kazakhstan	Turgyn Syzdyqov	People's Party of Kazakhstan	25 March 2016 – 30 December 2020
Nur Otan	Abai Tasbolatov	Nur Otan	25 March 2016 – 30 December 2020
Nur Otan	Mūrat Temırjanov	Nur Otan	25 March 2016 – 30 December 2020
Nur Otan	Bekbolat Tıleuhan	Nur Otan	25 March 2016 – 30 December 2020
Assembly of People	Yurīy Tīmoshchenko	Assembly of People	25 March 2016 – 30 December 2020
Nur Otan	Mūqtar Tınıkeev	Nur Otan	25 March 2016 – 28 December 2016
Nur Otan	Irina Unjakova	Nur Otan	25 March 2016 – 28 December 2016
Nur Otan	Serık Ümbetov	Nur Otan	25 March 2016 – 30 December 2020
Nur Otan	Baqytgül Hamenova	Nur Otan	25 March 2016 – 11 March 2020
Assembly of People	Şakir Hahazanov	Assembly of People	25 March 2016 – 30 December 2020
Nur Otan	Taras Hituov	Nur Otan	25 March 2016 – 30 December 2020
Assembly of People	Roman Kim	Assembly of People	25 March 2016 – 30 December 2020
Nur Otan	Mikhail Chirkov	Nur Otan	25 March 2016 – 30 December 2020
Nur Otan	Petr Şarapaev	Nur Otan	25 March 2016 – 30 December 2020
Nur Otan	Gennady Shipovskikh	Nur Otan	25 March 2016 – 30 December 2020
Nur Otan	Olga Shishigina	Nur Otan	25 March 2016 – 30 December 2020
Nur Otan	Gleb Shchegelsky	Nur Otan	25 March 2016 – 17 October 2020
Nur Otan	Baktykozha Izmukhambetov	Nur Otan	25 March 2016 – 30 December 2020
Nur Otan	Tatiana Yakovleva	Nur Otan	25 March 2016 – 30 December 2020

== 6th Senate ==
The powers of the Senate of the Parliament of the Republic of Kazakhstan of the 6th convocation began with the opening of its first session on 25 March 2016 and continued until 14 January 2021.

In the 6th Senate, the powers of the Senators elected in 2011 and 2014, appointed by the President of the Republic of Kazakhstan Nursultan Nazarbayev in 2011 and 2013, in accordance with constitutional norms, were continued.

On 28 June 2017, elections of Senators were held in accordance with the decree of the President of the Republic of Kazakhstan. The powers of the Senate members elected in 2011 were terminated due to the registration of the members elected in 2017.

In June 2018, the city of Shymkent became a city of republican significance, in connection with which, in October 2018, elections of Senators from the new administrative unit were held.

On 20 March 2019, Kassym-Jomart Tokayev's seat became vacant after he became the President of Kazakhstan following Nazarbayev's resignation. Before stepping down, Nazarbayev signed decree, replacing Tokayev with Senator Qairat Qojamjarov while his eldest daughter Dariga Nazarbayeva was elected as the Senate Chair.

On 12 August 2019, 6 new Senators were appointed by Tokayev, and two more Senators extended their powers.

Elections of Senate members were held on 12 August 2020 in accordance with the decree of the President of the Republic of Kazakhstan. The powers of the Senators elected in 2014 were terminated due to the registration of the members elected in 2017.

=== Structure ===
Office	MP	Term
Chair	Kassym-Jomart Tokayev	25 March 2016 — 20 March 2019
Chair	Dariga Nazarbayeva	20 March 2019 — 4 May 2020
Chair	Mäulen Äşimbaev	4 May 2020 — 30 December 2020
Deputy Chair	Sergey Gromov	25 March 2016 — 16 September 2016
Deputy Chair	Gülmira Esimbaeva	25 March 2016 — 12 August 2019
Deputy Chair	Bektas Beknazarov	16 September 2016 – 28 August 2020
Deputy Chair	Asqar Şäkirov	2 September 2019 – 30 December 2020
Deputy Chair	Nurlan Äbdirov	1 September 2020 – 30 December 2020

=== Senators ===
Representing	MP	Term	Notes
President	Mukhtar Altynbayev	25 March 2016 – 14 July 2017	Appointed by the President on 8 April 2010
President	Ikram Adyrbekov	25 March 2016 – 14 July 2017	Appointed by the President on 23 November 2011
President	Lyudmila Poltorabatko	25 March 2016 – 14 July 2017	Appointed by the President on 23 November 2011
President	Vladimir Bobrov	25 March 2016 – 27 October 2016	Appointed by the President on 5 November 2012
President	Byrganym Aitimova	25 March 2016 – 13 August 2019	Appointed by the President on 26 August 2013
President	Asqar Beisenbaev	25 March 2016 – 13 August 2019	Appointed by the President on 26 August 2013
President	Sergey Gromov	25 March 2016 – 13 August 2019	Appointed by the President on 26 August 2013
President	Läzzat Qiynov	25 March 2016 – 13 September 2017	Appointed by the President on 26 August 2013
President	Georgy Kim	25 March 2016 – 13 August 2019	Appointed by the President on 26 August 2013
President	Dulat Qūsdäuletov	25 March 2016 – 13 August 2019	Appointed by the President on 26 August 2013
President	Nūrlan Orazalin	25 March 2016 – 13 September 2016	Appointed by the President on 26 August 2013
President	Kassym-Jomart Tokayev	25 March 2016 – 20 March 2019	Appointed by the President on 16 October 2013
President	Bektas Beknazarov	25 March 2016 – 28 August 2020	Appointed by the President on 11 August 2014
President	Rashid Tusupbekov	25 March 2016 – 12 August 2019	Appointed by the President on 26 August 2015
President	Nurtai Abykayev	25 March 2016 – 13 July 2017	Appointed by the President on 25 December 2015
President	Dariga Nazarbayeva	15 September 2016 – 4 May 2020	Appointed by the President on 15 September 2016
President	Darhan Kaletaev	27 October 2016 – 4 April 2018	Appointed by the President on 27 October 2016
President	Säule Aitbaeva	14 July 2017 – 14 January 2021	Appointed by the President on 13 July 2017
President	Vladimir Volkov	14 July 2017 – 14 January 2021	Appointed by the President on 13 July 2017
President	Bakhytzhan Zhumagulov	14 July 2017 – 14 January 2021	Appointed by the President on 13 July 2017
President	Talgat Musabayev	14 July 2017 – 14 January 2021	Appointed by the President on 13 July 2017
President	Mukhtar Kul-Mukhammed	5 February 2018 – 14 January 2021	Appointed by the President on 1 February 2018
President	Qairat Qojamjarov	20 March 2019 – 14 January 2021	Appointed by the President on 19 March 2019
President	Dana Nūrjıgıtova	13 August 2019 – 14 January 2021	Appointed by the President on 12 August 2019
President	Läzzat Süleimen	13 August 2019 – 14 January 2021	Appointed by the President on 12 August 2019
President	Nūrtöre Jüsıp	13 August 2019 – 14 January 2021	Appointed by the President on 12 August 2019
President	Asqar Şäkirov	13 August 2019 – 14 January 2021	Appointed by the President on 12 August 2019
President	Qanatbek Safinov	13 August 2019 – 14 January 2021	Appointed by the President on 12 August 2019
President	Mäulen Äşimbaev	4 May 2020 – 14 January 2021	Appointed by the President on 4 May 2020
President	Nurlan Äbdirov	28 August 2020 – 14 January 2021	Appointed by the President on 28 August 2020
Akmola Region	Jabal Erğaliev	25 March 2016 – 29 June 2017	Elected in 2011
Akmola Region	Raşit Äkımov	25 March 2016 – 28 August 2020	Elected in 2014
Akmola Region	Däuren Ädılbekov	29 June 2017 – 14 January 2021	Elected in 2017
Akmola Region	Nūrlan Bekenov	28 August 2020 – 14 January 2021	Elected in 2020
Aktobe Region	Eleusın Sağyndyqov	25 March 2016 – 29 June 2017	Elected in 2011
Aktobe Region	Marat Tağymov	25 March 2016 – 28 August 2020	Elected in 2014
Aktobe Region	Mūqtar Jūmağaziev	29 June 2017 – 14 January 2021	Elected in 2017
Aktobe Region	Bauyrjan Qaniev	28 August 2020 – 14 January 2021	Elected in 2020
Almaty	Ahan Bijanov	25 March 2016 – 29 June 2017	Elected in 2011
Almaty	Töleubek Mūqaşev	25 March 2016 – 28 August 2020	Elected in 2014
Almaty	Dinar Nuketaeva	29 June 2017 – 14 January 2021	Elected in 2017
Almaty	Sūltanbek Mäkejanov	28 August 2020 – 14 January 2021	Elected in 2020
Almaty Region	Läzzat Tūrlaşov	25 March 2016 – 21 April 2016	Elected in 2011
Almaty Region	Aŋsar Mūsahanov	25 March 2016 – 28 August 2020	Elected in 2014
Almaty Region	Nūrlan Qylyşbaev	2 July 2016 – 14 January 2021	Elected in 2016 and 2017
Almaty Region	Sūltan Diusembinov	28 August 2020 – 14 January 2021	Elected in 2020
Atyrau Region	Qairat Işçanov	25 March 2016 – 29 June 2017	Elected in 2011
Atyrau Region	Särsenbai Eŋsegenov	25 March 2016 – 28 August 2020	Elected in 2014
Atyrau Region	Ğumar Diusembaev	29 June 2017 – 14 January 2021	Elected in 2017
Atyrau Region	Sağyndyq Lūqpanov	28 August 2020 – 14 January 2021	Elected in 2020
East Kazakhstan Region	Talğatbek Abaidıldin	25 March 2016 – 29 June 2017	Elected in 2011
East Kazakhstan Region	Sergey Plotnikov	25 March 2016 – 28 August 2020	Elected in 2014
East Kazakhstan Region	Düisenğazy Musin	29 June 2017 – 14 January 2021	Elected in 2017
East Kazakhstan Region	Olga Bulavkina	28 August 2020 – 14 January 2021	Elected in 2020
Jambyl Region	Ertarğyn Astaev	25 March 2016 – 29 June 2017	Elected in 2011
Jambyl Region	Mūratbai Joldasbaev	25 March 2016 – 28 August 2020	Elected in 2014
Jambyl Region	Abdaly Nuraliev	29 June 2017 – 14 January 2021	Elected in 2017
Jambyl Region	Bekbolat Orynbekov	28 August 2020 – 14 January 2021	Elected in 2020
Karaganda Region	Serık Aqylbai	25 March 2016 – 29 June 2017	Elected in 2011
Karaganda Region	Sergey Ershov	25 March 2016 – 14 January 2021	Elected in 2014 and 2020
Karaganda Region	Rysqali Äbdıkerov	29 June 2017 – 14 January 2021	Elected in 2017
Kostanay Region	Jeŋıs Nūrğaliev	25 March 2016 – 14 January 2021	Elected in 2010 and 2017
Kostanay Region	Serık Bektūrğanov	25 March 2016 – 28 August 2020	Elected in 2014
Kostanay Region	Sergey Karplyuk	28 August 2020 – 14 January 2021	Elected in 2020
Kyzylorda Region	Mūrat Baktiiarula	25 March 2016 – 14 January 2021	Elected in 2011 and 2017
Kyzylorda Region	Bekmyrza Elamanov	25 March 2016 – 28 August 2020	Elected in 2014
Kyzylorda Region	Akmaral Alnazarova	28 August 2020 – 14 January 2021	Elected in 2020
Mangystau Region	Mikhail Bortnik	25 March 2016 – 28 August 2020	Elected in 2014
Mangystau Region	Baqtybai Çelpekov	25 March 2016 – 14 January 2021	Elected in 2011 and 2017
Mangystau Region	Suindik Aldaşev	28 August 2020 – 14 January 2021	Elected in 2020
North Kazakhstan Region	Samat Eskendırova	25 March 2016 – 29 June 2017	Elected in 2011
North Kazakhstan Region	Serık Bılälov	25 March 2016 – 28 August 2020	Elected in 2014
North Kazakhstan Region	Erık Sūltanov	29 June 2017 – 14 January 2021	Elected in 2017
North Kazakhstan Region	Olga Perepechina	28 August 2020 – 14 January 2021	Elected in 2020
Nur-Sultan	Vladimir Redkokashin	25 March 2016 – 29 June 2017	Elected in 2011
Nur-Sultan	Serık Jaqsybekov	25 March 2016 – 28 August 2020	Elected in 2014
Nur-Sultan	Edıl Mamytbekov	29 June 2017 – 14 January 2021	Elected in 2017
Nur-Sultan	Ahylbek Kürışbaev	28 August 2020 – 14 January 2021	Elected in 2020
Pavlodar Region	Ashat Küzekov	25 March 2016 – 29 June 2017	Elected in 2011
Pavlodar Region	Manat Kubenov	25 March 2016 – 28 August 2020	Elected in 2014
Pavlodar Region	Nūrjan Nūrsipatov	29 June 2017 – 14 January 2021	Elected in 2017
Pavlodar Region	Altynbek Nuhūly	28 August 2020 – 14 January 2021	Elected in 2020
Shymkent	Nūrlan Beknazarov	9 October 2018 – 14 January 2021	Elected in 2018
Shymkent	Darhan Satybaldy	9 October 2018 – 19 March 2019	Elected in 2018
Shymkent	Aigül Qapbarova	25 June 2019 – 14 January 2021	Elected in 2019 and 2020
Turkistan Region	Quanyş Aitahanov	25 March 2016 – 29 June 2017	Elected in 2011
Turkistan Region	Äli Bektaev	25 March 2016 – 14 January 2021	Elected in 2014 and 2020
Turkistan Region	Älımjan Kurtaev	29 June 2017 – 14 January 2021	Elected in 2017
West Kazakhstan Region	Raşit Ahmetov	25 March 2016 – 29 June 2017	Elected in 2011
West Kazakhstan Region	Erbolat Mūqaev	25 March 2016 – 28 August 2020	Elected in 2014
West Kazakhstan Region	Nariman Töreğaliev	29 June 2017 – 14 January 2021	Elected in 2017
West Kazakhstan Region	Liazzat Rysbekova	28 August 2020 – 14 January 2021	Elected in 2020
