= 2007 Kazakh political shakeup =

Premiership transition in Kazakhstan

The change in the Kazakh political hierarchy of 2007 began on 8 January 2007 when Prime Minister Daniyal Akhmetov unexpectedly resigned, which led to the Senate's confirmation of Karim Masimov as his replacement on 11 January. Akhmetov did not state the reason for the resignation, but political analysts noted increasing criticism from President Nursultan Nazarbayev of his oversight of the economy.

== Appointments ==
Kanat Saudabayev, Kazakhstan's ambassador to the United States, became the secretary of the Kazakh Security Council, replacing Marat Tajin. Tajin became the Foreign Minister, replacing Kassym-Jomart Tokayev. Tokayev became the Chairman of the Senate of Kazakhstan, replacing Nurtai Abykayev. Abykayev became Kazakhstan's ambassador to Russia, a position he previously held from January 2002 to 2003, replacing Janseiıt Tüimebaev. Tüimebaev became the Education and Science Minister, replacing Byrganym Aitimova. Aytimova became Kazakhstan's ambassador to the United Nations.

President Nursultan Nazarbayev appointed Economy Minister Aslan Musin to Deputy Prime Minister, replacing Karim Masimov. Masimov replaced Daniyal Akhmetov as Prime Minister. Akhmetov replaced Mukhtar Altynbayev as Defense Minister. President Nazarbayev demoted Altynbayev to Deputy Minister of Defense. Galym Orazbakov replaced Vladimir Shkolnik as the Minister of Industry and Trade. Yerbol Orynbayev, a close aide to Nazarbayev, became Masimov's chief-of-staff. Shkolnik became the Deputy Chief of Staff to the President.

== Effects ==
Foreign Minister Tajin said Kazakhstan would continue "to pursue a multi-vector policy governed by the economic and political interests of our country," but Prime Minister Masimov was expected to take Kazakhstan's foreign policy farther in the direction of China based on his past political service and education background. Joanna Lillis of EurasiaNet has speculated that the shuffle may be tied to Kazakhstan's campaign to chair the Organization for Security and Cooperation in Europe in 2009.

The lingering scandals over the suspicious deaths and trials of opposition leaders Altynbek Sarsenbayev and Zamanbek Nurkadilov had little impact on the shakeup as Interior Minister Baurzhan Mukhamedzhanov, who received a considerable amount of criticism, maintained his position.
