= Şyñğys Ärinov =

Kazakh politician and (born 1983) and governor of Almaty Region

- Шыңғыс Әрінов
- Ärinov in 2026

Äkim of Almaty Region
- Incumbent
- Assumed office 4 September 2026
- President: Kassym-Jomart Tokayev
- Preceded by: Marat Sultangaziev

Minister of Emergency Situations
- In office 6 February 2024 – 3 September 2026
- President: Kassym-Jomart Tokayev
- Prime Minister: Oljas Bektenov
- Preceded by: Syrym Şäriphanov
- Succeeded by: Murat Muhanov

Deputy Head of the State Security Service — Head of the Security Service of the President of Kazakhstan
- In office 6 January 2022 – 6 February 2024
- President: Kassym-Jomart Tokayev
- Preceded by: Säken İsabekov
- Succeeded by: Roman Törehanov

Personal details
- Born: 29 October 1983 (age 42) Almaty Region, Kazakh SSR, Soviet Union
- Education: Al-Farabi Kazakh National University; Kazakh Academy of Labor and Social Relations; Academy of Civil Aviation
- Awards: Medal "For Valiant Execution of the Security of the Leader of the Nation"; Medal "25 Years of the State Security Service of the Republic of Kazakhstan"; Medal "30 Years of Independence of the Republic of Kazakhstan"

Military service
- Allegiance: Kazakhstan
- Branch/service: State Security Service; Ministry of Emergency Situations
- Years of service: 2006–2026
- Rank: Major general

Şyñğys Sairanūly Ärınov (Note: Often transliterated as Chingis Sayranovich Arinov through a Russified Romanization of Чингис Сайранович Аринов.) (Kazakh: Шыңғыс Сайранұлы Әрінов; born 29 October 1983) is a Kazakh politician and military officer who is serving as governor of Almaty Region since 2026. Previously, he was а Minister of Emergency Situations from 2024 to 2026 and head of the Security of the president of Kazakhstan of Kassym-Jomart Tokayev from 2022 to 2024.

== Biography ==
Ärinov was born in Almaty Region and graduated from Al-Farabi Kazakh National University with a degree in International Relations, from the Kazakh Academy of Labor and Social Relations with a degree in jurisprudence, and from the Academy of Civil Aviation with a degree in organization of transportation, traffic, and operation of transport.

From 2006 to 2022, Ärinov served in various officer and leadership positions within the State Security Service of the Republic of Kazakhstan. During this period, he advanced through operational and managerial roles within the special services.

From 6 January 2022 to 2024, he held the position of deputy head of the State Security Service of the Republic of Kazakhstan while simultaneously serving as head of the Security Service of the President of the Republic of Kazakhstan. On 6 May 2022, he was awarded the rank of major general of the State Security Service of the Republic of Kazakhstan.

On 6 February 2024, Ärinov was appointed Minister of Emergency Situations of the Republic of Kazakhstan by President Kassym-Jomart Tokayev, becoming responsible for civil protection, disaster response, and emergency management at the national level. After the new Kurultai parliament was elected on 28 August 2026, the government resigned and on 3 September Maqsat Muhanov was appointed to replace it.

On July 17, 2026, Şyñğys Ärinov and Ğani Mailybaev, deputy akim of the Almaty Region, were proposed by president Kassym-Jomart Tokayev as candidates for the post of akim of the Almaty Region. Ärinov received 83% of the votes of 178 members of Almaty Regional Mäslihat and by Tokayev's decree he was appointed to the post.

== Awards ==
- Medal "For Valiant Execution of the Security of the Leader of the Nation", 2nd and 3rd degrees
- Medal "25 Years of the State Security Service of the Republic of Kazakhstan"
- Medal "30 Years of Independence of the Republic of Kazakhstan" (2021)
