= Marat Sultangaziev =

Kazakh politician (born 1976)

- Марат Сұлтанғазиев
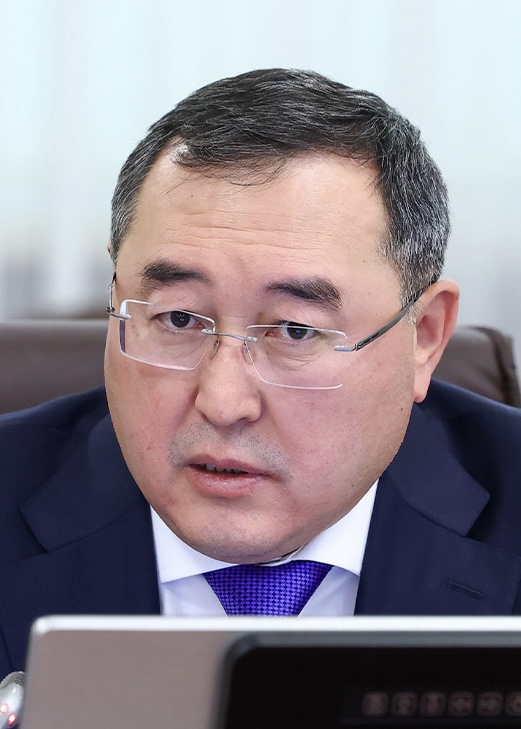
- Sultangaziev in 2026

Äkim of Almaty Region
- In office 11 June 2022 – 4 September 2026
- President: Kassym-Jomart Tokayev
- Preceded by: Qanat Bozymbaev
- Succeeded by: Şyñğys Ärinov

Personal details
- Born: 24 February 1976 (age 50) Karaturyk, Shelek, Almaty Region, Kazakh SSR, Soviet Union
- Education: Abai University; Kazakh Humanitarian Law University; Ryskulov University
- Awards: Order of Kurmet

Marat Eleusizūly Sultanğaziev (Note: Often transliterated as Marat Eleusizovich Sultangaziev through a Russified Romanization of Марат Елеусизович Султангазиев.) (Kazakh: Марат Елеусізұлы Сұлтанғазиев; born 24 February 1976) is a Kazakh economist who served as the äkim of Almaty Region from 2022 to 2026. He previously served as vice minister of finance from 2021 to 2022.

== Early life and education ==
Marat Yeleusizuly Sultangaziev was born on 24 February 1976, in Karaturyk, a village in Shelek District (now Enbekshikazakh District), Almaty Region, Kazakh Soviet Socialist Republic, Soviet Union.

In 1997, he graduated from the Abai University with a degree in economics and finance.

He studied at the Kazakh Humanitarian Law University (now Maqsut Narikbayev University), received a law degree in 2001, and earned an MBA from the Ryskulov University in 2010.

== Early career ==
In 1997, after graduating from Abai University in Almaty, he began working as a tax inspector in the Tax Audit Department of the Auezov District Tax Committee. In March 1999, he moved to the City Tax Committee, where he served as a tax inspector in the Coordination Department of the Administration Division, first as a leading and later as a chief tax inspector in the Department of Audit of Legal Entities. In November 2001, he was appointed head of the Audit Department of the Bostandyk District Tax Committee. He remained there until 2006, when he became head of the Tax Appeals, Explanations and Legal Support Department, and later of the Tax Audit Department of the City Tax Committee. In April 2008, the Tax Committee was renamed the Tax Department, and three months later Sultangaziev became deputy head of the City Tax Department.

In 2010, he moved to Astana, where he headed the Department for Coordination of Tax and Customs Legislation, Analysis and Revenue Forecasting in the Ministry of Finance.

In November 2012, he joined the Presidential Administration as head of Section A of the Social and Economic Monitoring Department.

On 18 November 2014, by decree of finance minister Bakhyt Sultanov, he was appointed head of the regional department of the State Revenue Committee in Almaty under the Ministry of Finance, thus returning to Almaty.

== Political career ==
On 18 October 2018, he was appointed head of the State Revenue Committee, returning to Astana.

On May 12, 2021, prime minister Asqar Mamin appointed Sultangaziev as deputy minister of finance Erulan Jamaubaev. After 6 months, on January 15, 2022 he was promoted to first deputy minister.

=== Äkim of Almaty Region ===
On 11 June 2022, he was relieved of his post. On the same day, prime minister Älihan Smaiylov, in the Almaty Region, presented president Tokayev’s proposal to consider the candidacies of Sultangaziyev and Batyrzhan Baizhumanov for the position of äkim (governor) of the region. A total of 129 out of 188 deputies of maslikhats at all levels in the region voted for Sultangaziyev, while 59 deputies supported Baizhumanov and by Tokayev's No. 916, Sultangaziyev was appointed to the post.

== Awards ==
- Order of Kurmet
