= Murat Muhanov =

Kazakh politician (born 1985)

Colonel Murat Muhanov
- Мұрат Мұханов
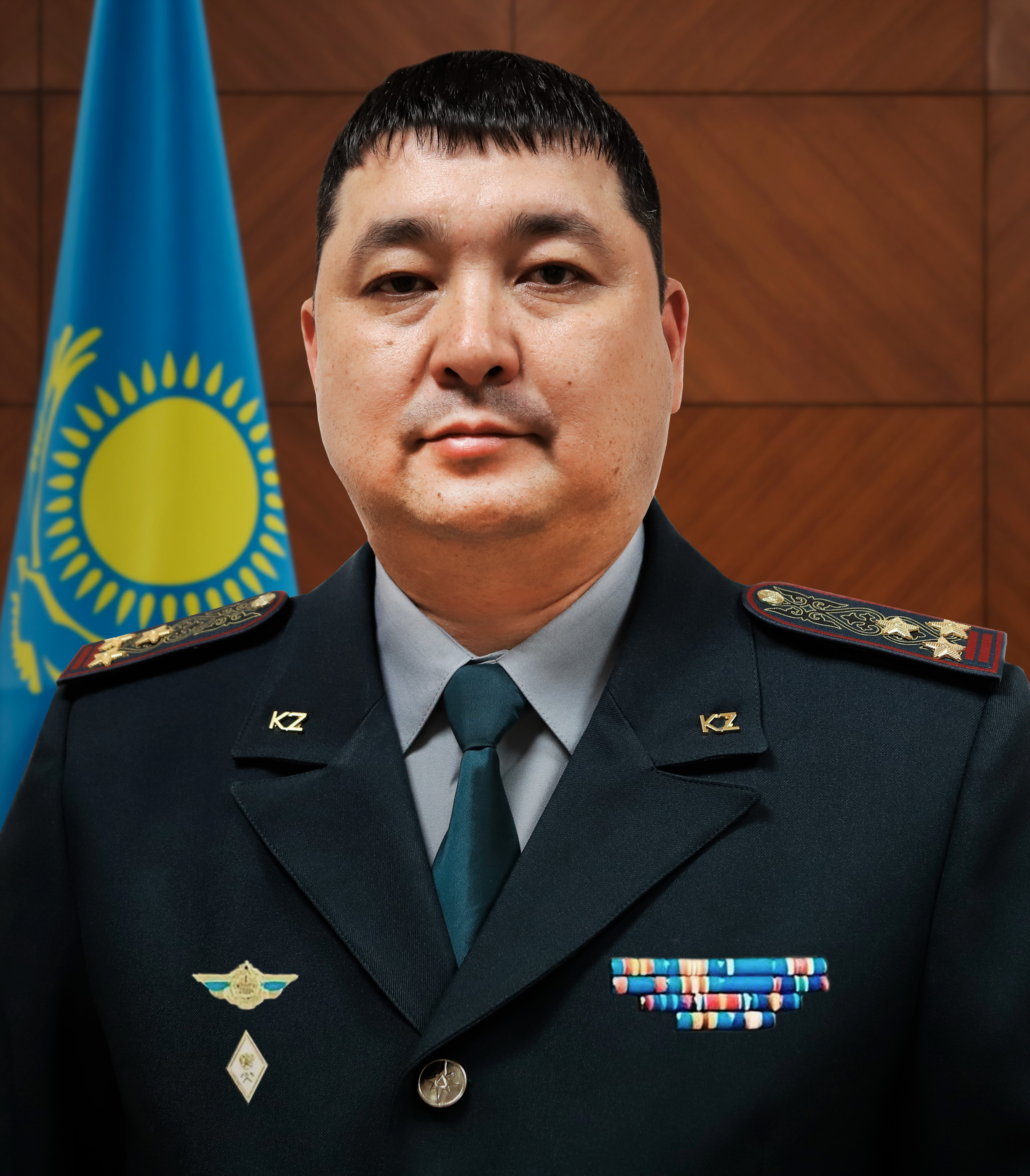
- Official portrait

Minister of Emergency Situations of Kazakhstan
- Incumbent
- Assumed office 3 September 2026
- President: Kassym-Jomart Tokayev
- Prime Minister: Oljas Bektenov
- Preceded by: Şyñğys Ärinov

Personal details
- Born: 1 July 1985 (age 41) Janaozen, Mangystau Region, Kazakh SSR, Soviet Union
- Education: Kokshetau Technical Institute of the Ministry of Emergency Situations of Kazakhstan; Saint-Petersburg University of the State Fire Service of the EMERCOM of Russia
- Awards: Order of Valor 2nd class

Military service
- Allegiance: Kazakhstan
- Service: Ministry of Emergency Situations
- Years of service: 2006–present
- Rank: Colonel

Murat Seyitmoldaūly Muhanov (Note: Often transliterated as Murat Seitmoldayevich Mukhanov through a Russified Romanization of Мурат Сейтмолдаевич Муханов.) (Kazakh: Мұрат Сейітмолдаұлы Мұханов; born July 1, 1985) is a Kazakh politician and colonel who has served as the minister for emergency situations since 2026.

== Biography ==

Murat Muhanov takes the oath office of Minister of Emergency Situations, September 8, 2026

Murat Seyitmoldauly Muhanov was born on July 1, 1985 in Janaozen, a city in Mangystau Region, Kazakh Soviet Socialist Republic, Soviet Union (now Kazakhstan).

In July 2006, after graduating from the Kokshetau Technical Institute of the Ministry of Emergency Situations of Kazakhstan with a degree in fire safety, Murat Muhanov joined the Fire Service Department of the Mangystau Region, where he spent a year working as an engineer in the Regulatory and Technical Division of the Fire Regulation and Licensing Department.

From 2007 to 2009, Muhanov served as a senior engineer in the Fire Regulation Division of the State Fire Control Department within the Fire Service Department. He was promoted to chief specialist from 2009 to 2010, and subsequently headed the division from 2010 to 2016. In 2016, Muhanov was appointed head of the Fire Safety Control and Prevention Department.

In 2017, Muhanov was appointed deputy head of the Department of Emergency Situations (DES) of the Mangystau Region, and in 2020, he was promoted to head of the DES. That same year, he graduated from the Saint-Petersburg University of the State Fire Service of the EMERCOM of Russia.

On 3 January 2024, he became the acting deputy chairman of the Fire Service Committee of the Ministry of Emergency Situations. On April 9, of the same year, he returned to his role as head of the Mangystau Region DES.

After 20 years of service in the Mangystau Region DES, on 9 June 2026, Minister for Emergency Situations Şyñğys Ärinov appointed Muhanov as chief of staff of the Ministry of Emergency Situations.

Following the resignation of the first Oljas Bektenov Government, on 3 September 2026, Murat Muhanov's candidacy for Minister for Emergency Situations was approved by the Kurultai and confirmed by president Kassym-Jomart Tokayev's decree, after which he joined the second Bektenov Government.

== Awards and ranks ==
- Order of Valor 2nd class.
- Medal "For Impeccable Service in the Firefighting Service" 3rd class.
- Medal "For Impeccable Service in Internal Affairs Agencies" 2nd class.
- Medal "For Distinction in the Prevention and Elimination of Emergency Situations".
- Medal "For Cooperation in the Name of Salvation" (Russia).
- "25 Years of the Kazakhstan Police" Badge.
- "100 Years of the Fire Service" Badge.
- Certificate of Honor from the Ministry of Emergency Situations of Kazakhstan.

=== Ranks ===
- Colonel.

== Personal life ==
Murat Muhanov has no publicly available information about his personal life, and speaks Russian in addition to his native Kazakh.
