= 2020 Kazakh Senate election =

Senate elections were held in Kazakhstan on 12 August 2020 to elect members of the Senate of Kazakhstan for the 6th Parliament of Kazakhstan. All 17 of the 49 seats were up for reelection including the newly created represented seat from the city of Shymkent. 2889 out of total 3069 members of the Mäslihats cast their vote for a Senator representing each region and three cities of republican significance.

== Electoral system ==
The deputies of the Senate of Kazakhstan are nonpartisan and are indirectly elected by the local legislative bodies Maslihats every six years. Each of the fourteen region and city of republican significance (Almaty, Astana, and Shymkent) are represented by two senators, renewed by half every three years, while 15 senators are appointed by the President of Kazakhstan.

== Results ==
=== National ===
Graph of the party split among 49 seats.
Party	Votes	%	Seats	+/–
Independents	2,874	100.00	17	+1
Not up			17	+1
Nominated			15	0
Total	2,874	100.00	49	+2
Valid votes	2,874	99.48		
Invalid/blank votes	15	0.52		
Total votes	2,889	100.00		
Registered voters/turnout	3,069	94.13		
Source: Registered, Voters

=== Akmola Region ===
Candidate	Votes	%
Nūrlan Bekenov	213	89.50
Ainagül Baltaşeva	13	5.46
Nūrlan Jarov	12	5.04
Valid votes	238	99.17
Invalid/blank votes	2	0.84
Total	240	100
Source: OSK

=== Aktobe Region ===
Candidate	Votes	%
Bauyrjan Qaniev	143	79.89
Altynbek Ämırğaliev	36	20.11
Valid votes	179	100
Invalid/blank votes	0	0
Total	240	100
Source: OSK

=== Almaty ===
Candidate	Votes	%
Sūltanbek Mäkejanov	30	100
Andrei Zakharov	0	0
Timur Nūrtaev	0	0
Valid votes	30	100
Invalid/blank votes	0	0
Total	30	100
Source: OSK

=== Almaty Region ===
Candidate	Votes	%
Sūltan Diusembinov	264	92.63
Äset Qydyrmanov	21	7.37
Valid votes	285	99.3
Invalid/blank votes	2	0.7
Total	287	100
Source: OSK

=== Atyrau Region ===
Candidate	Votes	%
Sağyndyq Lūqpanov	86	82.69
Andrei Zakharov	11	10.58
Timur Nūrtaev	7	6.73
Valid votes	104	99.05
Invalid/blank votes	1	0.95
Total	105	100
Source: OSK

=== East Kazakhstan Region ===
Candidate	Votes	%
Olga Bulavkina	255	93.07
Nūrjan Jumadılov	7	2.55
Igor Panchenko	6	2.19
Yuri Starokozhev	6	2.19
Valid votes	274	99.64
Invalid/blank votes	1	0.36
Total	275	100
Source: OSK

=== Jambyl Region ===
Candidate	Votes	%
Bekbolat Orynbekov	163	92.09
Äset Qydyrmanov	14	7.91
Valid votes	177	100
Invalid/blank votes	0	0
Total	177	100
Source: OSK

=== Karaganda Region ===
Candidate	Votes	%
Sergey Ershov (incumbent)	222	83.15
Andrei Lyapunov	28	10.49
Igor Akhmeev	17	6.73
Valid votes	267	100
Invalid/blank votes	0	0
Total	267	100
Source: OSK

=== Kostanay Region ===
Candidate	Votes	%
Sergey Karplyuk	225	87.21
Pavel Koval	18	6.98
Aleksandr Korostylev	15	5.81
Valid votes	258	98.47
Invalid/blank votes	4	1.53
Total	262	100
Source: OSK

=== Kyzylorda Region ===
Candidate	Votes	%
Akmaral Alnazarova	102	77.86
Mūrat Särsenbaev	25	19.08
Aidyn Qairullaev	4	3.05
Valid votes	131	100
Invalid/blank votes	0	0
Total	131	100
Source: OSK

=== Mangystau Region ===
Candidate	Votes	%
Suindik Aldaşev	87	87.00
Erbol Baijıgıt	13	13.00
Valid votes	100	100
Invalid/blank votes	0	0
Total	100	100
Source: OSK

=== North Kazakhstan Region ===
Candidate	Votes	%
Olga Perepechina	162	87.57
Dangole Mogunova	23	12.43
Valid votes	185	98.93
Invalid/blank votes	2	1.07
Total	187	100
Source: OSK

=== Nur-Sultan ===
Candidate	Votes	%
Ahylbek Kürışbaev	15	75.00
Meirambai Oralov	3	15.00
Mäulen Samambetov	2	10.00
Valid votes	20	100
Invalid/blank votes	0	0
Total	20	100
Source: OSK

=== Pavlodar Region ===
Candidate	Votes	%
Altynbek Nuhūly	150	81.97
Oleg Kruk	17	9.29
Gülnara Qaidarova	16	8.74
Valid votes	183	100
Invalid/blank votes	0	0
Total	183	100
Source: OSK

=== Shymkent ===
Candidate	Votes	%
Aigül Qapbarova (incumbent)	18	72.00
Tolqyn Aiubaeva	4	16.00
Bektai Ormanov	3	12.00
Valid votes	25	100
Invalid/blank votes	0	0
Total	25	100
Source: OSK

=== Turkistan Region ===
Candidate	Votes	%
Äli Bektaev (incumbent)	216	91.53
Tolqyn Aiubaeva	20	8.47
Valid votes	236	99.16
Invalid/blank votes	2	0.84
Total	238	100
Source: OSK

=== West Kazakhstan Region ===
Candidate	Votes	%
Liazzat Rysbekova	128	70.33
Aqylbek Amanğaliev	30	16.48
Ğalym Bekqaliev	24	13.19
Valid votes	182	100
Invalid/blank votes	1	0
Total	183	100
Source: OSK
