= Syrym Şäriphanov =

Kazakh politician

- Сырым Шәріпханов
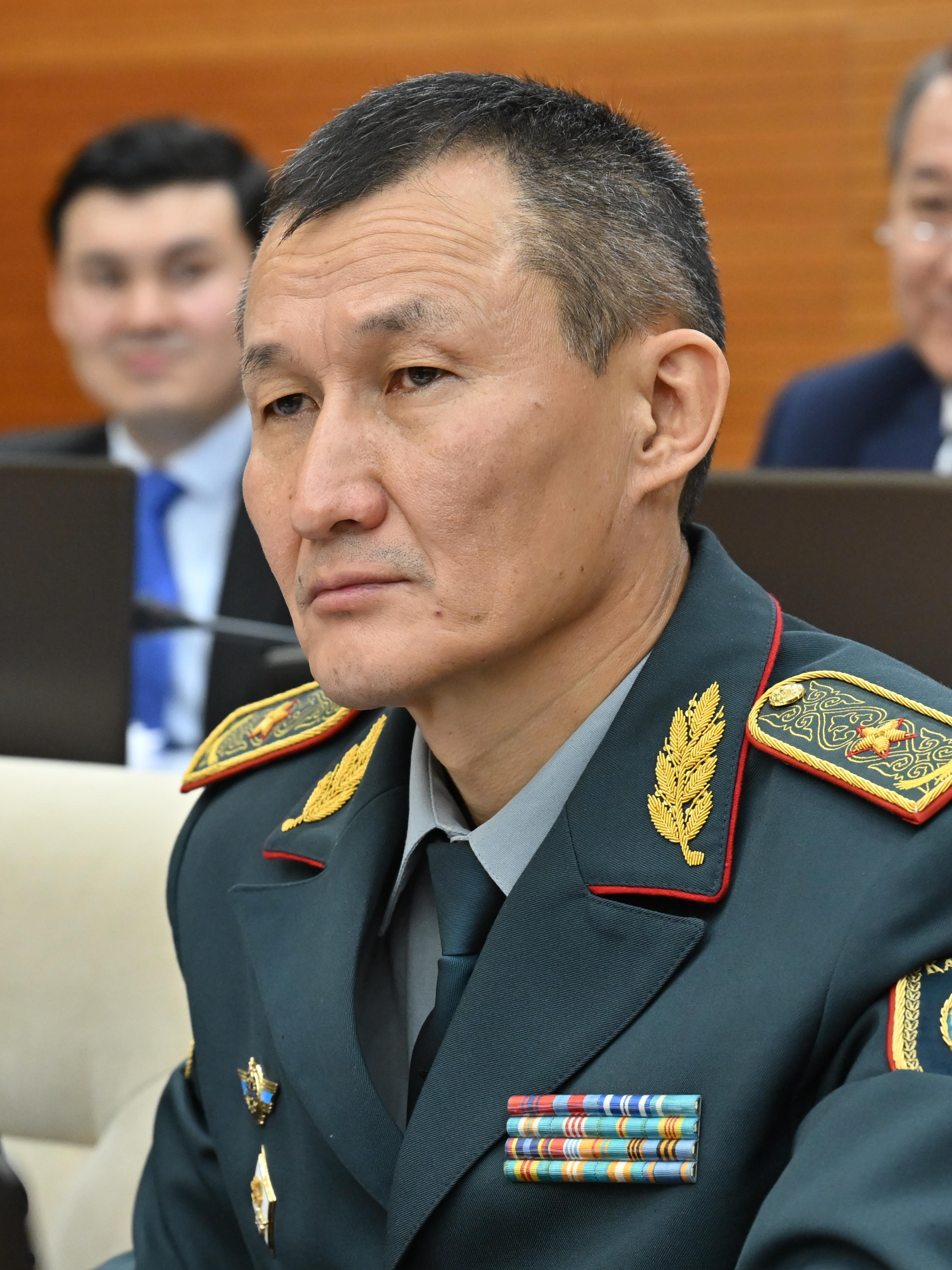
- Şäriphanov in 2023

Minister of Emergency Situations
- In office 10 June 2023 – 6 February 2024
- President: Kassym-Jomart Tokayev
- Prime Minister: Älihan Smaiylov; Roman Sklyar (acting)
- Preceded by: Yuri Ilyin
- Succeeded by: Şyñğys Ärinov

Personal details
- Born: 1 May 1967 (age 59) Alma-Ata, Kazakh SSR, Soviet Union (now Almaty, Kazakhstan)
- Education: Kazan Higher Military Command and Engineering School; Academy of Civil Protection of the Ministry of Emergency Situations of Russia; Kokshe Academy; Academy of the State Fire Service of the Ministry of Emergency Situations of Russia

Military service
- Allegiance: Soviet Union (1991); Kazakhstan (1991–1993)
- Branch/service: Soviet Army; Kazakh Ground Forces
- Years of service: 1991–1993
- Unit: 44th Missile Brigade

Syrym Düisenğazyuly Şäriphanov (Kazakh: Сырым Дүйсенғазыұлы Шәріпханов; born 1 May 1967) is a Kazakh politician, major general, and Doctor of Technical Sciences who served as Minister of Emergency Situations of the Republic of Kazakhstan from 10 June 2023 to 6 February 2024. He is vice president of the Academy of Military Sciences and a leading specialist in civil protection and emergency management.

== Biography ==
=== Early life and education ===
Şäriphanov was born in Alma-Ata (now Almaty) . He received his military and academic education at several institutions, graduating from the Kazan Higher Military Command and Engineering School in 1991. He later studied at the Academy of Civil Protection of the Ministry of Emergency Situations of Russia, completing his program in 2002 and then postgraduate studies in 2005. He continued his professional development at the Kokshe Academy, where he graduated in 2015, and subsequently at the Academy of the State Fire Service of the Ministry of Emergency Situations of Russia in 2018.

=== Career ===
Şäriphanov began his service between 1991 and 1993 as a senior operator of the launch battery in the missile division of the 44th Missile Brigade of the 40th Army of the Turkestan Military District. From 1993 to 1996 he worked as deputy head of the civil defense courses of the Dzhambul regional headquarters. Between 1996 and 1999 he headed the training and education centre of the Jambyl Region Emergency Ddepartment. In 1999 and 2000 he served as deputy head of the Republican Advanced Training Courses for Managers in Emergency Situations and Civil Defense in Almaty.

After completing his studies in Moscow from 2000 to 2002, Şäriphanov returned to Kazakhstan and between 2002 and 2005 worked as deputy head of the department and training-education centre of the Almaty City Department of Emergency Situations. He then headed the department for the protection of territories and population of the Almaty emergency department from 2005 to 2008, later becoming head of the civil defense department of the same agency from 2008 to 2010.

In 2010, Şäriphanov became deputy head of the Kokshetau Technical Institute of the Ministry of Emergency Situations, and in 2013 he was appointed head of the institute. He remained in this position until 2021, when he was named head of the Malik Gabdullin Civil Protection Academy.

On 10 June 2023, Şäriphanov was appointed Minister of Emergency Situations of Kazakhstan. He served in the ministerial post until 6 February 2024.
