= 2017 Kazakh Senate election =

Senate elections were held in Kazakhstan on 28 June 2017. All 16 seats representing the regions of Kazakhstan were elected by the local legislative bodies (maslihats). 3242 of the 3293 eligible electorates voted in the election.

== Electoral system ==
The members of the Senate of Kazakhstan are nonpartisan and are indirectly elected by the local legislative bodies Maslihats every six years. Each of the fourteen region and cities of Almaty and Astana are represented by two senators while 15 senators are appointed by the President of Kazakhstan.

== Results ==
=== National ===
Graph of the party split among 47 seats.
Party	Votes	%	Seats	+/–
Independents	3,237	100.00	16	0
Not up			16	0
Nominated			15	0
Total	3,237	100.00	47	0
Valid votes	3,237	99.85		
Invalid/blank votes	5	0.15		
Total votes	3,242	100.00		
Registered voters/turnout	3,293	98.45		
Source: Registered, Voters

=== Akmola Region ===
Candidate	Votes	%
Däuren Ädılbekov	256	94.46
Damir Doshojin	15	5.54
Valid votes	271	100
Invalid/blank votes	0	0
Total	271	100
Source: OSK

=== Aktobe Region ===
Candidate	Votes	%
Mūqtar Jūmağaziev	176	93.12
Ädılbek Dıljanov	13	6.88
Valid votes	189	99.47
Invalid/blank votes	1	0.53
Total	190	100
Source: OSK

=== Almaty ===
Candidate	Votes	%
Dinar Nuketaeva	32	94.12
Alexei Balagansky	1	2.94
Bekzat Şuaqov	1	2.94
Valid votes	34	100
Invalid/blank votes	0	0
Total	34	100
Source: OSK

=== Almaty Region ===
Candidate	Votes	%
Nūrlan Qylyşbaev (incumbent)	298	91.13
Erkebūlan Ömırzaqov	29	8.87
Valid votes	327	100
Invalid/blank votes	0	0
Total	327	100
Source: OSK

=== Astana ===
Candidate	Votes	%
Edıl Mamytbekov	23	92.00
Däulet Sütemgenov	2	8.00
Valid votes	25	100
Invalid/blank votes	0	0
Total	25	100
Source: OSK

=== Atyrau Region ===
Candidate	Votes	%
Ğumar Diusembaev	108	82.44
Qarşyğa Djaumbaev	12	9.16
Seiıtjanov Baljıgıtov	11	8.40
Valid votes	131	100
Invalid/blank votes	0	0
Total	131	100
Source: OSK

=== East Kazakhstan Region ===
Candidate	Votes	%
Düisenğazy Musin	291	93.57
Aqymğazy Baimüldımov	20	6.43
Valid votes	311	99.68
Invalid/blank votes	1	0.32
Total	312	100
Source: OSK

=== Jambyl Region ===
Candidate	Votes	%
Abdaly Nuraliev	172	86.87
Qairat Terlıkbaev	26	13.13
Valid votes	198	99.50
Invalid/blank votes	1	0.50
Total	199	100
Source: OSK

=== Karaganda Region ===
Candidate	Votes	%
Rysqali Äbdıkerov	241	82.53
Aristotel Isagulov	51	17.47
Valid votes	292	99.66
Invalid/blank votes	1	0.34
Total	293	100
Source: OSK

=== Kostanay Region ===
Candidate	Votes	%
Jeŋıs Nūrğaliev (incumbent)	256	86.49
Jeŋıs Jarlyğasov	22	7.43
Asqar Jabaev	18	6.08
Valid votes	296	100
Invalid/blank votes	0	0
Total	296	100
Source: OSK

=== Kyzylorda Region ===
Candidate	Votes	%
Mūrat Baktiiarula (incumbent)	101	70.14
Akmaral Alnazarova	30	20.83
Erjan Ajıkenov	13	9.03
Valid votes	144	100
Invalid/blank votes	0	0
Total	144	100
Source: OSK

=== Mangystau Region ===
Candidate	Votes	%
Baqtybai Çelpekov	86	76.11
Halila Nūrğalieva	27	23.89
Valid votes	113	100
Invalid/blank votes	0	0
Total	113	100
Source: OSK

=== North Kazakhstan Region ===
Candidate	Votes	%
Erık Sūltanov	176	84.62
Meiram Mendybaev	16	7.69
Esjan Orazalin	16	7.69
Valid votes	208	99.52
Invalid/blank votes	1	0.48
Total	209	100
Source: OSK

=== Pavlodar Region ===
Candidate	Votes	%
Nūrjan Nūrsipatov	161	82.14
Qairat Nūrmağambetov	19	9.69
Qanat Altaev	16	8.16
Valid votes	196	100
Invalid/blank votes	0	0
Total	196	100
Source: OSK

=== South Kazakhstan Region ===
Candidate	Votes	%
Älımjan Kurtaev	253	82.14
Seiıtjappar Esjanov	55	17.86
Valid votes	308	100
Invalid/blank votes	0	0
Total	308	100
Source: OSK

=== West Kazakhstan Region ===
Candidate	Votes	%
Nariman Töreğaliev	156	80.41
Nūrjan Serketov	38	19.59
Valid votes	194	100
Invalid/blank votes	0	0
Total	194	100
Source: OSK
