= Galym Orazbakov =

Kazakh politician and diplomat (born 1964)

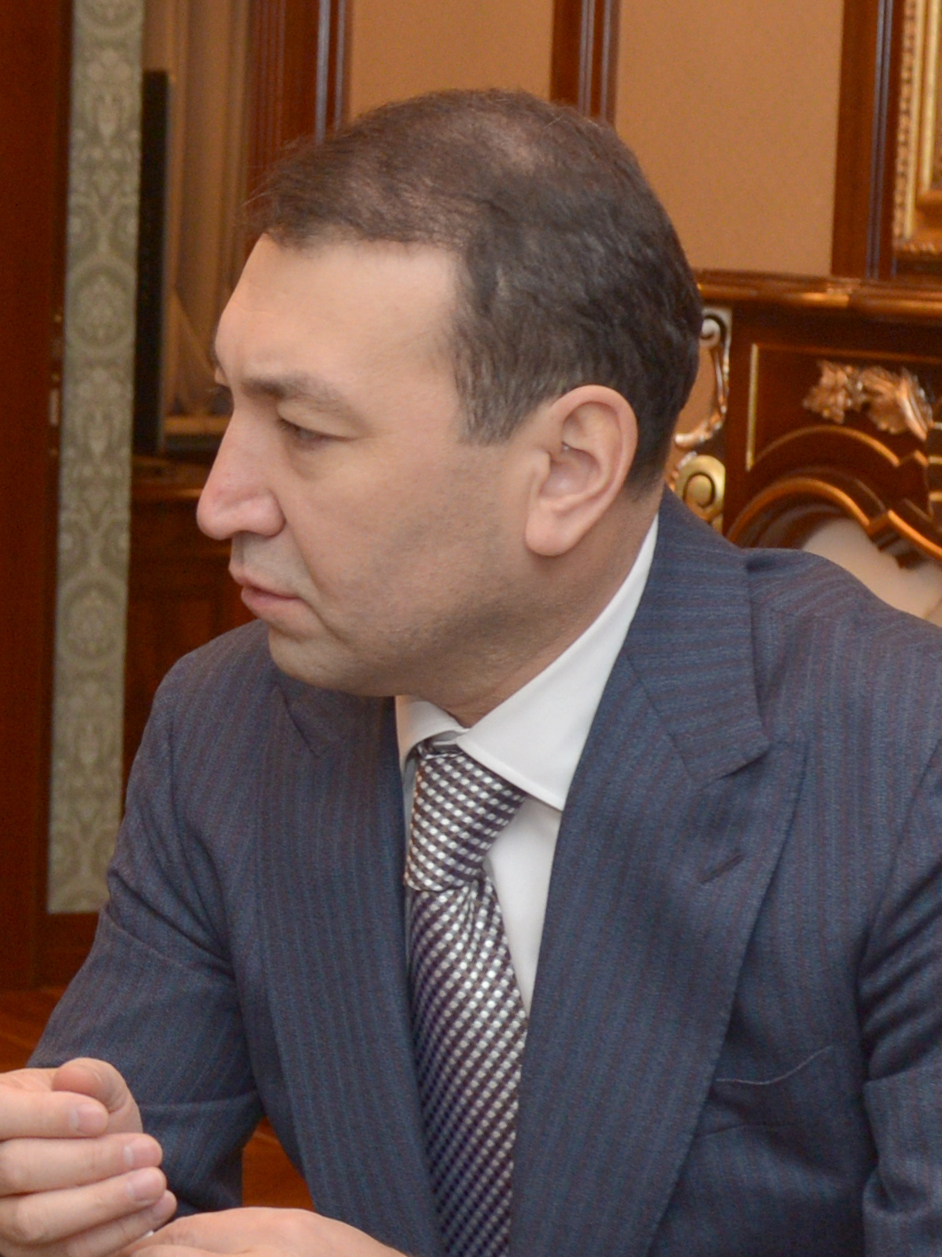
Orazbakov in 2013

Ğalym Izbasarūly Orazbaqov (Note: Often transliterated as Galym Izbasarovich Orazbakov through a Russified Romanization of Галым Избасарович Оразбаков.) (Kazakh: Ғалым Ізбасарұлы Оразбақов; born 1964) is a Kazakh politician and diplomat, who has served as the Minister of Industry and Trade of Kazakhstan since he replaced Vladimir Shkolnik on 10 January 2007 in a political shakeup. He served there until February 2008.

He previously served as President of the Kazakhstan Engineering National Company, the state-owned arms-exporting company, and as the Deputy Minister of Industry and Trade. Orazbaqov later became Ambassador of Kazakhstan to Russia from 2012 to 2014.
