= Asain Baikhanov =

Kazakh politician (born 1977)

- Асайын Байханов
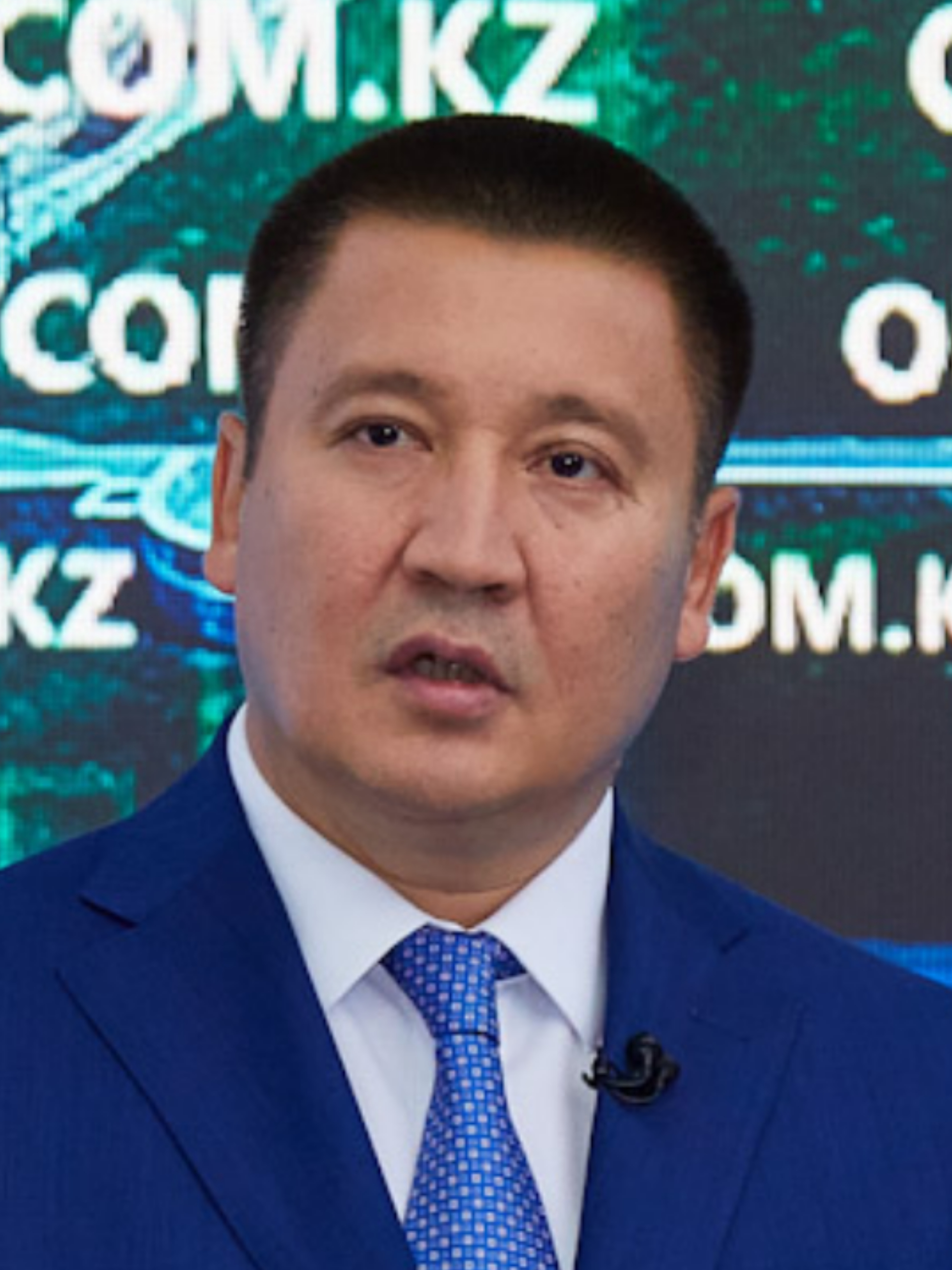
- Baikhanov in 2024

Akim of Pavlodar Region
- Incumbent
- Assumed office 7 December 2022
- President: Kassym-Jomart Tokayev
- Preceded by: Abylkair Skakov

Akim of Pavlodar city
- In office 19 July 2021 – 7 December 2022
- President: Kassym-Jomart Tokayev
- Preceded by: Erjan Imanslyam
- Succeeded by: Erjan Imanzaipov

Personal details
- Born: 6 December 1977 (age 48) Pavlodar Region, Kazakh SSR, Soviet Union
- Children: 4
- Education: Pavlodar University; Moscow State University

Asaiyn Quandyqūly Baihanov (Note: Often transliterated as Asain Kuandykovich Baykhanov through a Russified Romanization of Асаин Куандыкович Байханов.) (Kazakh: Асайын Қуандықұлы Байханов; born 6 December 1977) is a Kazakh economist serving as the akim of Pavlodar Region since 2022. Previously, he served as the akim of Pavlodar from 2021 to 2022.

== Early life and education ==
Asain Kuandykuly Baikhanov was born on 6 December 1977, in Bayanaul District, Pavlodar Region, Kazakh Soviet Socialist Republic, Soviet Union (now Kazakhstan).

In 2000, Baikhanov graduated from the Pavlodar University (now Toraighyrov University) with a degree in economics and management. He earned an MBA from the Moscow State University in 2017.

== Early career ==
After graduating from Pavlodar University in 2000, Baikhanov worked in the banking sector on a programme implemented by the Office of the European Bank for Reconstruction and Development in Kazakhstan, initially as an intern at the Ekibastuz branch and later as head of the department for the Implementation of New Banking Products at the head office in Almaty.

From 2003 to 2007, he held senior positions in the German international banking group ProCredit Holding AG in Kyiv, including serving as executive director of ProCredit Ukraine; in 2005–2006 he undertook professional development at the ProCredit Corporate Training Centre and at the EBRD.

After returning to Kazakhstan in 2007, Baikhanov was appointed deputy chairman of Nurbank, where he was responsible for expanding the branch network and developing lending to small and medium-sized enterprises, including in the agricultural sector.

In 2009, Baikhanov moved into agriculture and, until 2015, launched and developed several successful projects in livestock and crop production, as well as in logistics and freight transportation in Almaty and the Almaty Region.

From 2015 to 2020 he served as deputy chairman of KazAgroProduct.

== Political career ==
On 21 March 2020, by decree of the akim of Pavlodar Region, Abylkair Skakov, Baikhanov was appointed deputy akim of region.

On 19 July 2021, with the approval of the city maslikhat and by decree of regional akim Skakov, Baikhanov was appointed akim of Pavlodar city.

When akim Skakov resigned the post remained vacant 6 days. On 7 December, president Kassym-Jomart Tokayev proposed Baikhanov and akim of Bayanaul District Serik Batyrgujinov for the post of akim of Pavlodar Region. In an open vote attended by 177 members, Baikhanov received 135 votes while Batyrgujinov received 42 votes. After winning the vote by Tokayev's decree No. 41 Baikhanov appointed 11th akim of Pavlodar Region.

== Personal life ==
Baikhanov is married and has four children.
