= Zamanbek Nurkadilov =

Kazakh politician

- Заманбек Нұрқаділов

Chairman of the Ministry of Emergency Situations
- In office 19 May 2001 – 13 March 2004
- Preceded by: Shalbay Kulmakhanov
- Succeeded by: Nurahmet Bizhanov

Äkim of Almaty Region
- In office 5 December 1997 – 14 May 2001
- Preceded by: Serik Umbetov
- Succeeded by: Shalbay Kulmakhanov

Äkim of Almaty
- In office 8 February 1992 – 20 June 1994
- First Deputy: Viktor Khrapunov
- Preceded by: Office established
- Succeeded by: Shalbay Kulmakhanov

Personal details
- Born: Zamanbek Qalabayuly Nurkadilov; 15 January 1944 Kegen, Kazakh SSR, Soviet Union
- Died: 11 November 2005 (aged 61) Almaty, Kazakhstan

Zamanbek Qalabaiūly Nūrqadılov (Kazakh: Заманбек Қалабайұлы Нұрқаділов; 15 January 1944 – 11 November 2005) was a Kazakh politician who served as the head of Almaty in Kazakhstan and Minister of Emergency Situations in the Nazarbayev administration. In March 2004, he began to criticize President Nursultan Nazarbayev. On 11 November 2005, three weeks before the 2005 presidential election, someone shot him twice in the chest and once in the head. The Government of Kazakhstan ruled his death a suicide, but Radio Free Europe alleges he was the victim of an assassination, which led many people to believe that Nazarbayev was responsible for the assassination.

== Early life and career ==
Nurkadilov was born to a Muslim family in the village of Kegen in Almaty Region on the border with China. He moved to Alma-Ata in 1961 to study at the civil engineering faculty of the Kazakh Polytechnic Institute. After graduating, he worked for almost 20 years in city and regional construction organizations. In the late 1970s, Nurkadilov became the head of Kazselezashchita, then the department of Glavalmaatastroy, and in November 1985, the chairman of the Almaty City Executive Committee.

== Political career ==
In March 1990, Nurkadilov, as mayor of Alma-Ata, became a deputy of the Supreme Soviet of the XII convocation, first elected in conditions of partial alternativeness and competition. A year later, in the spring of 1991, Nurkadilov became the chairman of the City Council of People's Deputies and concurrently the First Secretary of the City Committee of the Communist Party. After the 1991 August Coup and the dissolution of the CPSU, he retained the post of chairman of the Soviet, and after the establishment in the spring of 1992 of the Institute of Heads of Regional, city and district administrations, Nurkadilov was appointed head of Alma-Ata on 8 February 1992. He held that position until 20 June 1994.

In December 1995, Nurkadilov ran in the 1995 Kazakh legislative election and was elected as a member of the Mazhilis of the first convocation where he began to criticize the government and the ruling regime as a whole. As part of the opposition, Nurkadilov become a close ally to the leaders of the Azamat Civil Movement and the Generation Pensioners' Movement. He made a speech at the protest rally on Chokan Valikhanov Square in December 1996, and in January 1997, Nurkadilov wrote an open letter to President Nursultan Nazarbayev with sharp criticism of his policies. When the Parliament moved to Astana, Nurkadilov refused to leave the former capital and unexpectedly received an appointment as akim of the enlarged Almaty Region, which has absorbed the territories of the former Almaty and Taldy-Kurgan regions.

Having served as akim of the region from 1997 to 2001, Nurkadilov became most famous for his project to build an international airport north of Kapchagay and a propaganda campaign to collect gold items from the population of rural areas in a kind of “homeland fund”. Despite the fact that Nurkadilov demonstratively, in front of the television cameras, handed over his and his wife's gold jewelry, to the famous singer Makpal Zhunusova, nevertheless the public impression of this action and the reaction to it in the political and media community was so negative that the campaign was very promptly terminated.

In early 2001, after the decision to move the capitol of the Almaty Region to Taldykorgan, Nurkadilov again stayed in Almaty, being appointed chairman of the Agency for Emergency Situations.

After working in this post for three years, Nurkadilov convened a press conference on 11 March 2004, at which he read out his new open letter to Nazarbayev. Among the many acutely critical passages expressed in it, it was possible to highlight those of them, the material for which was taken by Nurkadilov from his spheres of activity in the leadership of the Almaty City Hall in the early 1990s and the Emergency Situations Agency for the three previous years. It was about the privatization of suburban sanatoriums and rest homes of the former Central Committee of the Communist Party and the Council of Ministers of the Kazakh SSR, and then the buildings of ministries and republican departments relocated to Astana, about the fate of the Piedmont apple orchards of the Almaty airport, about the development of mountain slopes and gorges with mansions that damage the environment and dangerous for their inhabitants themselves in case of natural disasters.

At the end of his open letter, Nurkadilov called on Nazarbayev to resign as President. In response, he received a decree on his dismissal from the post of Chairman of the ACS RK. Soon thereafter, the agency was reorganized into the Ministry of Emergency Situations of the Republic of Kazakhstan and relocated to Astana as the last of all republican departments. Nurkadilov who remained in the southern capital, who became an opposition for the second time in his life, made several more loud statements in 2004 and 2005, for one of which he was sentenced on 13 June 2005 to a fine of 485,500 tenge (about $4,000). At the same time, Nurkadilov himself filed several lawsuits against one of his former colleagues in ASF and the television news agency Khabar for their widespread negative assessments of his professional competence and style of work when he was the head of the agency.

In connection with the presidential elections, many observers expected Nurkadilov to nominate his candidacy for the presidency, which the politician expressed his intention in that very sensational statement of 11 March 2004. However, no such statement was made on his part.

== Death ==
On 12 November 2005, Nurkadilov was found dead at home with three gunshot wounds, two shots were fired in the chest and one in the head. The official version of the incident was ruled as a suicide. He is buried in Almaty at the Kensai Cemetery.
