= List of Äkims of Pavlodar Region =

This is the list of äkms of Pavlodar Region that have held the position since 1992.

== List of Äkıms ==
- Asyğat Jabağin (10 February 1992 – 18 January 1993)
- Danial Ahmetov (19 January 1993 – 19 December 1997)
- Ğalymjan Jaqianov (19 December 1997 – 21 November 2001)
- Danial Ahmetov (21 November 2001 – 11 June 2003)
- Qairat Nūrpeiısov (14 June 2003 – 30 September 2008)
- Baqytjan Sağyntaev (30 September 2008 – 20 January 2012)
- Erlan Aryn (20 January 2012 – 20 December 2013)
- Qanat Bozymbaev (20 December 2013 – 25 March 2016)
- Bolat Baqauov (25 March 2016 – 21 January 2020)
- Äbılqaiyr Sqaqov (21 January 2020 – 1 December 2022)
- Asain Baikhanov (since 7 December 2022)
