= List of Äkims of Almaty Region =

This is the list of äkims of Almaty Region that have held the position since 1992.

== List ==
- Ahmetjan Esımov (8 February 1992 – 12 October 1994)
- Ömirzaq Özbekov (14 October 1994 – 6 March 1996)
- Serık Ümbetov (6 March 1996 – 5 December 1997)
- Zamanbek Nūrqadılov (5 December 1997 – 19 May 2001)
- Şalbai Qūlmahanov (19 May 2001 – 11 August 2005)
- Serık Ümbetov (11 August 2005 – 13 April 2011)
- Añsar Mūsahanov (13 April 2011 – 20 August 2014)
- Amandyq Batalov (20 August 2014 – 24 November 2021)
- Kanat Bozumbayev (24 November 2021 – 10 June 2022)
- Marat Sultangaziev (11 June 2022 – present)

== See also ==
- Akim
