= Qanat Bozymbaev =

Kazakh politician (born 1969)

- Қанат Бозымбаев
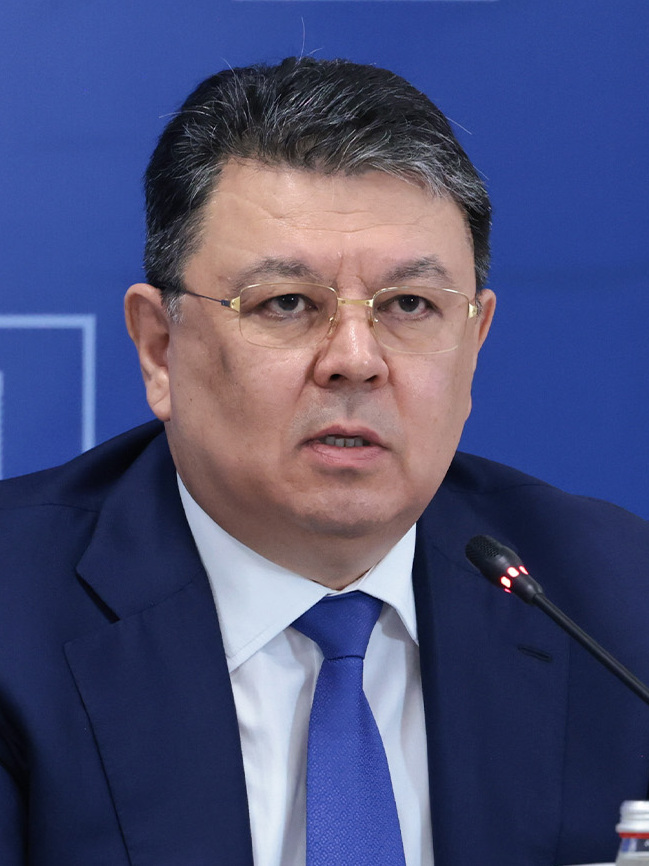
- Bozymbaev in 2025

Deputy Prime Minister of Kazakhstan
- Incumbent
- Assumed office 31 March 2024
- President: Kassym-Jomart Tokayev
- Prime Minister: Oljas Bektenov

Äkim of Almaty Region
- In office 24 November 2021 – 10 June 2022
- Preceded by: Amandyk Batalov
- Succeeded by: Marat Sultangaziev

Minister of Energy
- In office 25 March 2016 – 18 December 2019
- President: Kassym-Jomart Tokayev; Nursultan Nazarbayev
- Prime Minister: Askar Mamin; Bakytzhan Sagintayev
- Preceded by: Vladimir Shkolnik
- Succeeded by: Nurlan Nogaev

Äkim of Pavlodar Region
- In office 20 December 2013 – 25 March 2016
- Preceded by: Erlan Aryn
- Succeeded by: Bolat Baqaov

Äkim of Jambyl Region
- In office 30 November 2009 – 20 December 2013
- Preceded by: Boribai Jeksembin
- Succeeded by: Karim Kokirekbaev

Personal details
- Born: 8 January 1969 (age 57) Alma-Ata, Kazakh SSR, Soviet Union
- Spouse: Elmira Bozumbaeva

Qanat Aldabergenūly Bozymbaev (Note: Often transliterated as Kanat Aldabergenovich Bozumbayev through the Russified Romanization of Канат Алдабергенович Бозумбаев.) (Kazakh: Қанат Алдабергенұлы Бозымбаев, IPA: [qɑˈnɑt ɑɫˌdɑbʲerˌɡʲenʊˈɫʊ boˌzʊmˈbɑjɪf]; born 8 January 1969) is a Kazakh politician, who has been serving as Deputy Prime Minister of Kazakhstan since 2024. Prior to this role, Bozymbaev held several important positions in both local government and national administration. He served as the advisor to the President from 2023 to 2024 and as the Akim of Almaty Region from 2021 to 2022. Bozymbaev was also the assistant to the President from 2019 to 2022. He held significant ministerial roles, including the Minister of Energy from 2016 to 2019, where he oversaw major energy projects in Kazakhstan. Additionally, he was the Akim of Pavlodar Region from 2013 to 2016 and the Jambyl Region from 2009 to 2013.

Throughout his career, Bozymbaev has been a key figure in Kazakhstan's energy sector and government reforms.

== Early career ==
Bozymbaev was born in the city of Alma-Ata (now Almaty). He is from the Zhalaiyr clan of the Senior Juz. In 1993, he graduated from the Kazakh State Academy of Management with a degree in economics. After completing his studies, Bozymbaev began his professional career as an economist at Edem Ltd construction company.

Bozumbayev's state service began in 1997 when he was appointed head of the Regional Policy Department at the Ministry of Economy and Trade of Kazakhstan. Later, he worked in the oil and gas sector, serving as the Director of the Oil and Gas Department and as Deputy Minister of Energy, Industry, and Trade of Kazakhstan between 1998 and 2001.

In 2001, he moved to the electricity sector, becoming the First Vice President of KEGOC. In 2001, he was appointed President of KEGOC, a position he held until 2007.

From 2007 to 2008, Bozumbayev served as the chairman of the board of the Samruk-Kazyna sovereign wealth fund. In 2008, he returned to KEGOC as President until 2009.

=== Akim of Jambyl Region ===
On 30 November 2009, Bozymbaev was appointed as the akim of the Jambyl Region. Upon taking office, he set priorities aimed at attracting both domestic and foreign investments, revitalizing the regional economy amidst the Great Recession, reducing unemployment, enhancing infrastructure such as roads, and resolving persistent issues like inadequate access to clean water in rural communities.

Under Bozymbaev's tenure, the Jambyl Region, recognized as Kazakhstan's top region in socio-economic development dynamics for 2012 by the Presidential Administration and the Government of Kazakhstan, achieved a 33% growth in gross regional domestic product (GRDP) over three years, including a 9.8% increase in 2012 year alone, reaching a record GRDP of 764 billion tenge. Bozumbayev’s administration prioritized regional improvements in education, healthcare, and infrastructure, leading to the construction of new schools, kindergartens, healthcare facilities, and cultural centers across urban and rural areas.

A notable achievement by Bozymbaev was the promotion of green technology, making the Jambyl Region a pioneer in renewable energy market. His leadership saw the completion of five renewable energy projects with a total capacity of 15 megawatts. Additionally, his tenure attracted substantial investments, enabling the development of industrial zones and initiating projects aimed at creating new jobs and further bolstering economic growth.

=== Akim of Pavlodar Region ===
From December 2013 to March 2016, he became the Akim of Pavlodar Region.

During his tenure in Pavlodar, Bozumbayev was also elected chairman of the regional branch of the Nur Otan party in 2014.

=== Minister of Energy ===
From March 2016 to December 2019, Bozumbayev served as Minister of Energy. In this role, he was responsible for overseeing the country's energy sector, which included the management of oil, gas, and electricity resources.

During his tenure, he oversaw significant energy projects, including the expansion of major oil and gas fields such as Tengiz, Kashagan, and Karachaganak, which boosted Kazakhstan's overall oil production. He played a key role in the modernization of the country's three largest oil refineries, completed in 2018, which reduced seasonal gasoline shortages and reliance on Russian imports, leading to surplus production and the first gasoline exports to Europe. Additionally, Bozumbayev led the construction of the Saryarka main gas pipeline from the Kyzylorda Region to Astana, enhancing Kazakhstan's gasification efforts. By the end of 2019, the country's gasification level reached 51%, up from 43% in 2015, with plans for further expansion. These initiatives significantly improved Kazakhstan's energy infrastructure, production capacity, and export potential.

=== Later roles ===
In December 2019, Bozumbayev was appointed Assistant to the President of Kazakhstan. Additionally, he joined the Board of Directors of the Samruk-Kazyna National Welfare Fund in 2020, which is responsible for managing Kazakhstan's state-owned assets.

In 2021, Bozumbayev served as the Akim of Almaty Region for a brief period before being appointed as an Advisor to the President in September 2023. In March 2024, Bozumbayev was appointed Deputy Prime Minister of Kazakhstan, a position that marks a significant milestone in his political career.

Bozumbayev’s career has been marked by his leadership in the energy sector and his significant contributions to Kazakhstan’s economic and infrastructure development, particularly in energy, governance, and the management of national assets.

== Controversies ==
In November 2014, a photo surfaced on the internet showing Bozymbaev with his eyes closed during President Nursultan Nazarbayev's State of the Nation Address. The image sparked speculation that Bozumbayev was sleeping. He responded to the controversy by stating, "I'm not a fool to sleep during the address of the head of state. If I had slept there, I probably wouldn’t have been standing in front of you. There were hundreds of people sitting around me, and they can confirm who was sleeping or not."

During his tenure as Minister of Energy, Bozymbaev faced criticism over the development of certain energy sectors. In the fall of 2017, Kazakhstan experienced a gasoline shortage in several regions, which led to a motion being submitted to President Nazarbayev on 10 October 2017 by Prime Minister Bakhytjan Sagintayev, calling for a reprimand of Bozymbaev. As a result, Bozymbaev’s deputy, Aset Magauov, who was responsible for the fuel and energy complex, was dismissed from his post. Although Bozymbaev was issued a disciplinary sanction on 11 October by Nazarbayev, the sanction was lifted in February 2018.

Bozymbaev's name has also been associated with the trial of two former deputy ministers of energy, Gani Sadibekov and Bakytzhan Dzhaksaliyev. Both were detained in 2018 in connection with an embezzlement case involving funds allocated for the cleaning of Lake Qarasu between 2015 and 2017. Sadibekov was accused of embezzling 1 billion tenge, while Dzhaksaliyev is charged with causing state damage amounting to about 740 million tenge. In a media interview in January 2020, Sadibekov’s lawyer, Almira Shaikhina, suggested that the trial against her client was partly intended to discredit Bozymbaev, his former superior.

Bozymbaev is infamous for being a controversial figure in Kazakh politics, particularly a gaffe, in which when talking to the people of Taldykorgan during the 2022 Kazakh unrest, he, then-Akim of Almaty Region, accidentally cursed at a citizen.
