= Äkim of Almaty =

Äkım of Almaty
- Coat of arms of City of Almaty

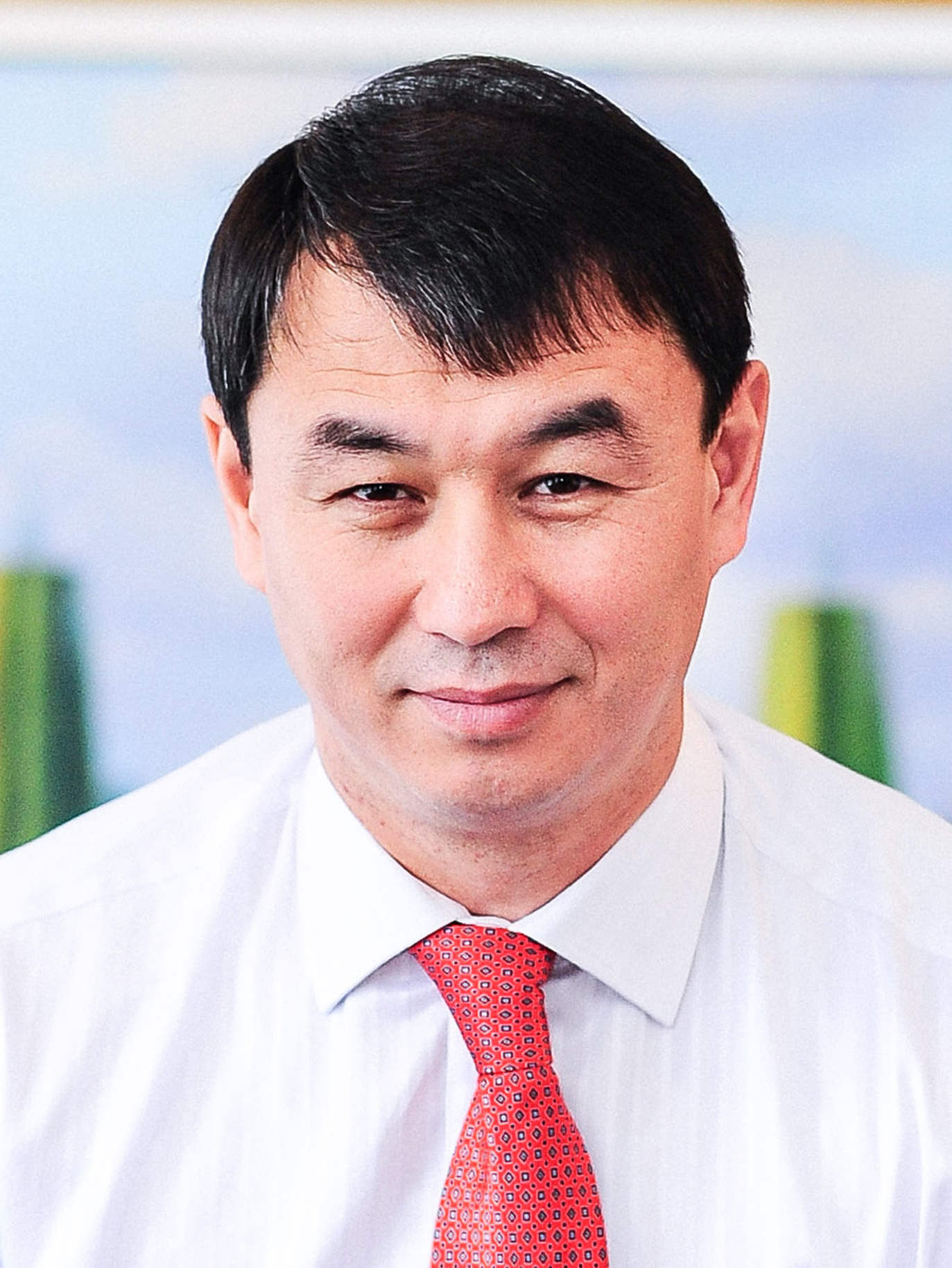
- Incumbent; Darhan Satybaldy since 24 May 2025
- Appointer: President
- Inaugural holder: Zamanbek Nurkadilov
- Formation: 8 February 1992

The Äkim (Kazakh: әкім, äkım) of Almaty is the chief authority in the city of Almaty. The position was established in 1992.

== List ==
=== Äkıms of Almaty (1992–present) ===
No.	Portrait	Name (birth–death)	Term of office		Political party
No.	Portrait	Name (birth–death)	Took office	Left office	Political party
1		Zamanbek Nurkadilov (1944–2005)	8 February 1992	20 June 1994	Independent
2		Shalbay Kulmakhanov (born 1946)	20 June 1994	16 June 1997	Independent
3		Viktor Khrapunov (born 1948)	16 June 1997	9 December 2004	Independent
4		Imangali Tasmagambetov (born 1956)	9 December 2004	14 April 2008	Nur Otan
5		Akhmetzhan Yessimov (born 1950)	14 April 2008	9 August 2015	Nur Otan
6		Bauyrjan Baibek (born 1974)	9 August 2015	28 June 2019	Nur Otan
7		Bakhytzhan Sagintayev (born 1963)	28 June 2019	31 January 2022	Nur Otan
8		Erbolat Dosaev (born 1970)	31 January 2022	24 May 2025	Amanat
9		Darhan Satybaldy (born 1974)	24 May 2025	Present	Amanat

== See also ==
- List of Akims Astana City
- Akim
