= Amandyk Batalov =

Kazakh politician

Amandyq Batalov
- Амандық Баталов

Äkim of Almaty Region
- In office 20 August 2014 – 24 November 2021
- Preceded by: Ansar Musahanov
- Succeeded by: Qanat Bozymbaev

Personal details
- Born: 22 November 1952 (age 73) Nukus, Karakalpak ASSR, Uzbek SSR, Soviet Union

Amandyq Ğabbasūly Batalov (Kazakh: Амандық Ғаббасұлы Баталов; born 22 November 1952) is a Kazakh politician who was the governor of Almaty Region from 2014 to 2021.

A hydraulic engineer by profession, he served as the acting first deputy governor of Almaty region from April 2008, the mayor of the Zhetysu District of Almaty, the first deputy chief of administration of Kalinin District of Almaty, vice president of the "Construction Industry and Technology" concern.

== Early life and engineering ==
Batalov was born in 1952, in Nukus, Soviet Uzbekistan. After graduating from the Dzhambul Institute for Water Management, he worked as a construction foreman, principal engineer and SMU-37 for the construction company, "Almaataotdelstroi" from 1981 to 1985. From 1985 to 1987, he held various positions in the following organizations:

- Senior construction foreman, chief engineer and head of the construction company, "Almaataotdelstroi" (1981–1985)
- Instructor of the Lenin District Committee of Communist Party of Kazakhstan
- Secretary of the regional Committee of trade union of workers of construction and construction materials
- Instructor of the Department of construction and municipal economy of Almaty city for the Committee of the Communist party of Kazakhstan (1985–1987);
- The chairman of the regional committee of the trade union of workers of construction and construction materials industry (1987–1989)
- Leading specialist and chief specialist of the Department of construction and construction materials industry management for the Affairs of the Council of Ministers of the Kazakh Soviet Socialist Republic (1989–1991)
- Assistant to the department of construction and construction materials industry of the Presidential office of the Kazakh Soviet Socialist Republic (1991–1992)
- Vice president of the group, "Construction industry and technology" (1992)

== Political career ==
- Deputy and first deputy head of administration of the Kalinin district of Almaty city (1992–1994)
- The head of Lenin District administration (1994–1995)
- Mayor of Zhetysu district of Almaty (1995–2001)
- Deputy mayor of Almaty region (June 2001 to April 2008)
- First Deputy Governor of Almaty region (April 2008 to August 2014)
- Mayor of Almaty Region (20 August 2014, powers extended to 22 November 2020)
- Member of the National Commission for the implementation of the "program of modernization of public consciousness" led by the president of Kazakhstan (since 17 April 2017)
- Representative for the local government to the Parliament of Kazakhstan for the Nur Otan (since 3 February 2016).

== Sports activities ==
- The president of the Volleyball Federation of Almaty city and Almaty Region (since 2001)
- Master of sports in volleyball, he is the current President of the volleyball Federation of Almaty city and Almaty region (since 2001) and the volleyball club "Zhetysu".

== Social activities ==
- Member of the Board of Directors of the National company "Socio-entrepreneurial Corporation", "ZHETYSU" (June 2008)
- Chairman of the Board of Directors of the National company "Socio-entrepreneurial Corporation", "ZHETYSU" (December 2014).

== Honors ==
- Order of Kurmet (2008) and Order of Parasat (15 December 2014)
- Medals of "Astana" and "10 years of Kazakhstan's independence"
- The sign of "Honorary Worker for sport of Kazakhstan"
- The title of "Academician of the International Informatization Academy".

== Personal life ==
Batalov is married to Bagda Utegulovna Batalova (née Bekturganova) and they have three children; Sayora (1977), Adilbek (1982) and Islambek (1994).
