= 2014 Kazakh Senate election =

2014 Kazakh Senate elections
- 1 October 2014

16 of the 47 seats in the Senate
- Turnout: 98.69%
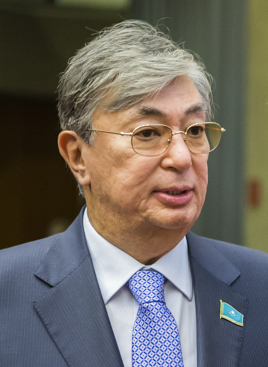
	First party
Leader	Kassym-Jomart Tokayev
Party	Nonpartisan
Leader since	16 October 2013
Last election	16
Seats won	16
Seat change	Steady
Percentage	100%
Chair before election
Kassym-Jomart Tokayev
Nonpartisan
Elected Chair
Kassym-Jomart Tokayev
Nonpartisan

Senate elections were held in Kazakhstan on 1 October 2014 during the 5th convocation of the Kazakh Senate. The elections were held following a decree by then-president Nursultan Nazarbayev.

== Seats ==
All 16 seats representing the regions of Kazakhstan were elected by the local legislative bodies (maslihats). 3,236 out of the 3,279 eligible legislators voted in the election.

== Electoral system ==
Members of the Senate are elected on the basis of indirect suffrage by secret ballot. Half of elected members of the Senate are up for election every three years. Fifteen members are appointed by the President of Kazakhstan with a view to ensuring representation for all the diverse national, cultural components of society. The term of office for the members of the Senate is 6 years.

== Structure of Senate ==
Each of the fourteen regions, and the cities of Almaty and Astana are represented by two senators, while 15 senators are appointed by the President of Kazakhstan.
