= 2011 Kazakh Senate election =

2011 Kazakh Senate elections
- 19 August 2011

16 of the 47 seats in the Senate
- Turnout: 96.6%
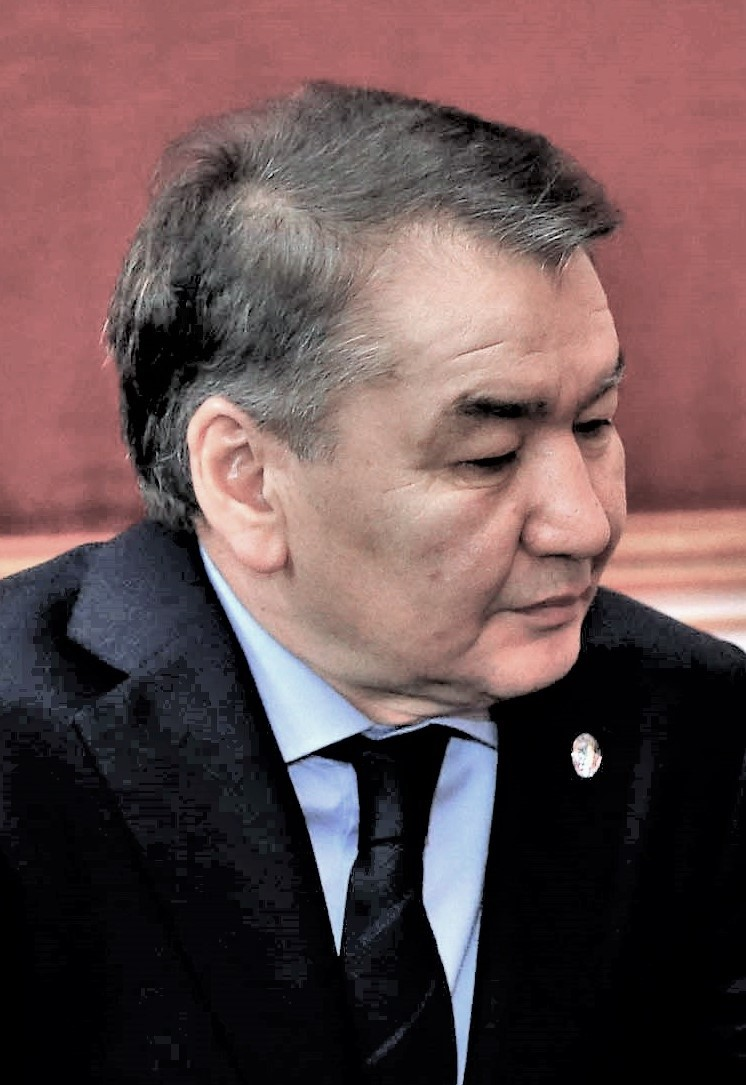
	First party
Leader	Kairat Mami
Party	Nonpartisan
Leader since	15 April 2011
Last election	16
Seats won	16
Seat change	Steady
Percentage	100%
Chair before election
Kairat Mami
Independent
Elected Chair
Kairat Mami
Independent

Senate elections were held in Kazakhstan on 19 August 2011. All 16 seats representing the regions of Kazakhstan were elected by the local legislative bodies (maslihats). A total of 3,172 of the 3,283 eligible electorates voted in the election.

== Electoral system ==
The members of the Senate of Kazakhstan are nonpartisan and are indirectly elected by the local legislative bodies Mäslihat every six years. Each region and city of Almaty and Astana are represented by two senators while 15 senators are appointed by the President of Kazakhstan.
