= Karaturyk =

Karaturyk Қаратұрық
- Village
- Location in Kazakhstan
- Coordinates: 43°33′25″N 77°59′07″E
- Country: Kazakhstan
- Region: Almaty Region
- District: Enbekshikazakh District

Population (2009)
  - Total: 3,565
- Time zone: UTC+6 (Omsk Time)

Karaturyk (Kazakh: Қаратұрық, Qaratūryq) is a village in Almaty Region, in south-eastern Kazakhstan.
