= Vladimir Bozhko =

Kazakh politician (born 1949)

- Владимир Божко
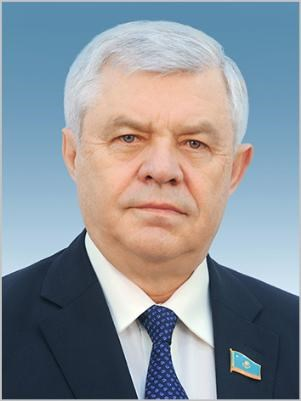
- Official portrait, 2020

Minister of Emergency Situations
- In office 13 November 2007 – 6 August 2014
- President: Nursultan Nazarbayev
- Prime Minister: Karim Massimov; Serik Akhmetov
- Preceded by: Viktor Khrapunov
- Succeeded by: Yuri Ilyin (2020)

Deputy Chair of the Mazhilis
- In office 25 March 2016 – 30 December 2020
- Chair: Baktykozha Izmukhambetov; Nurlan Nigmatulin
- Preceded by: Abai Tasbolatov
- Succeeded by: Pavel Kazantsev

Member of the Mazhilis
- In office 20 March 2016 – 30 December 2020

Personal details
- Born: 16 May 1949 (age 76) Alma-Ata, Kazakh SSR, Soviet Union
- Spouse: Tatiyana Bozhko

Vladimir Karpovich Bozhko (Russian: Владимир Карпович Божко; born 16 May 1949) is a Kazakh lawyer and politician who served as the Deputy Chair of the Mazhilis from 2016 to 2020. He is the former Minister of Emergency Situations of Kazakhstan.

While Bozhko was a lieutenant general, he also graduated from the Kazakh Polytechnic Institute with a PhD in law. After graduating, he worked at the Almaty electrotechnical plant. From 1976, Bozhko served in national security bodies, where he ascended from a detective to the first vice head of the National Security Committee. Before being appointed Emergency Minister in November 2007, he served as Deputy Chairman of the National Security Committee.
