= Auezov District =

Auezov District Әуезов ауданы
- City Districts
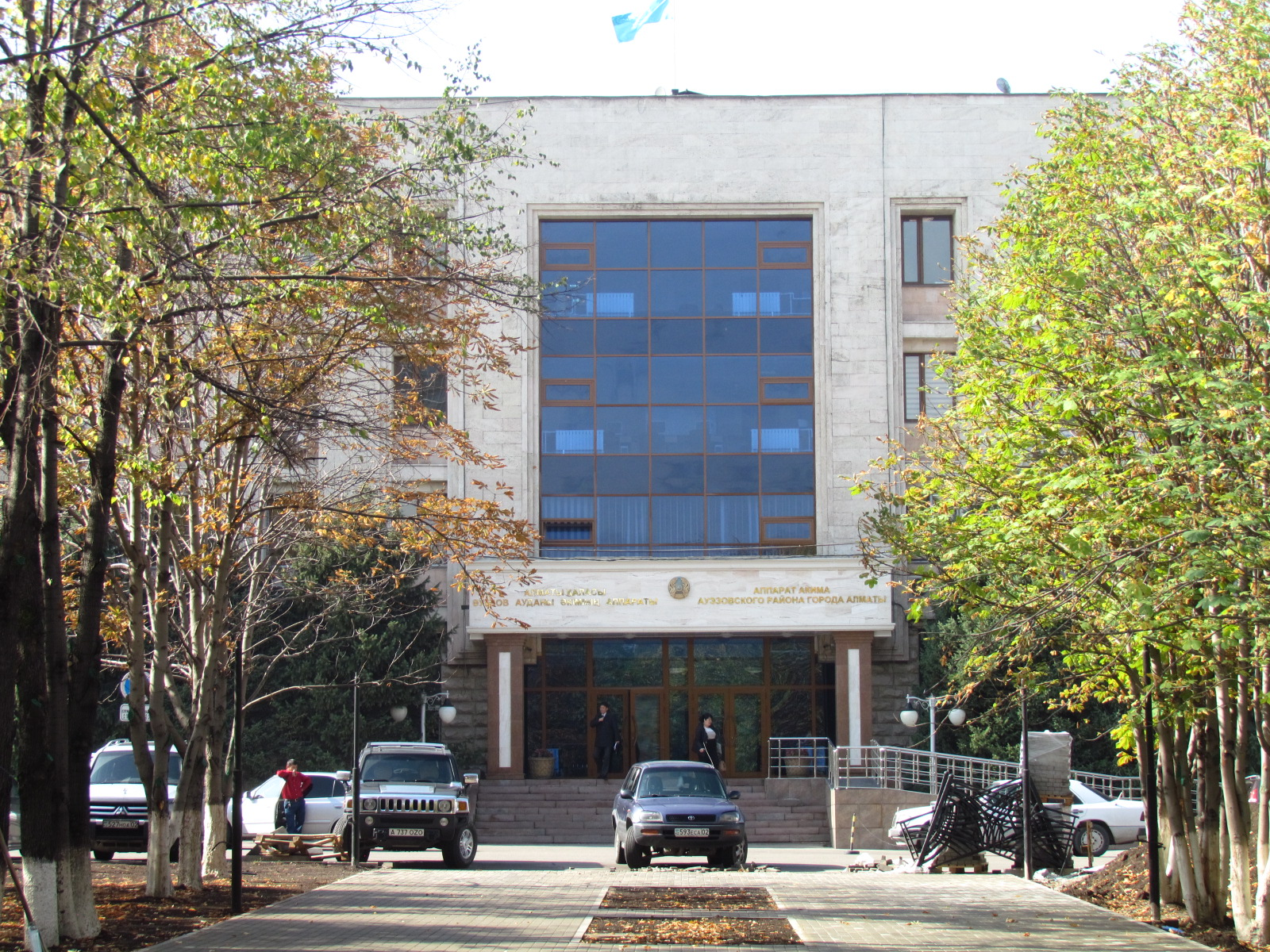
- Auezov District Akimat

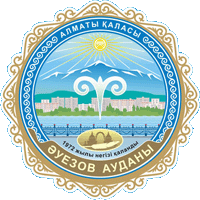
- Seal

- Location in Kazakhstan
- Coordinates: 43°13′27″N 76°51′01″E
- Country: Kazakhstan
- Region: Almaty
- Established: 10 March 1972

Government
  - Akim: Abzal Egemberdiev

Population (2019)
  - Total: 295,543
- Time zone: UTC+6 (UTC+6)

Auezov District (Kazakh: Әуезов ауданы) is an administrative subdivision of the city of Almaty. It was established on 10 March 1972.

== History ==
Auezov district was formed on March 10, 1972, by Decree of the Presidium of the Supreme Soviet of the Kazakh SSR as a result of the disbandment of Leninsky and Kalininsky districts. It is named after the Soviet Kazakh scientist, writer and playwright Mukhtar Auezov.

== Akim ==
1. Shatov, Evgeny Ivanovich (1994 — 1997)
2. Ustyugov, Vladimir Nikolaevich (1997 — 2006)
3. Nesipbayev, Adil Sagimbekovich (17.07.2006 — 2009)
4. Torgaev, Bekkali Nurgalievich (13.08.2009 — 02.2015)
5. Rakhimbetov, Altai Ergazinovich (20.02.2015 — 26.09.2018)
6. Uskenbayev, Anuar Auezovich (26.09.2018 — 26.08.2019)
7. Sayfedenov, Sairan Tapenovich (28.08.2019)
8. Egemberdiev, Abzal Kuandykovich (19.05.2023)
