= Vladimir Shkolnik =

Kazakhstani politician (born 1949)

- Владимир Школьник
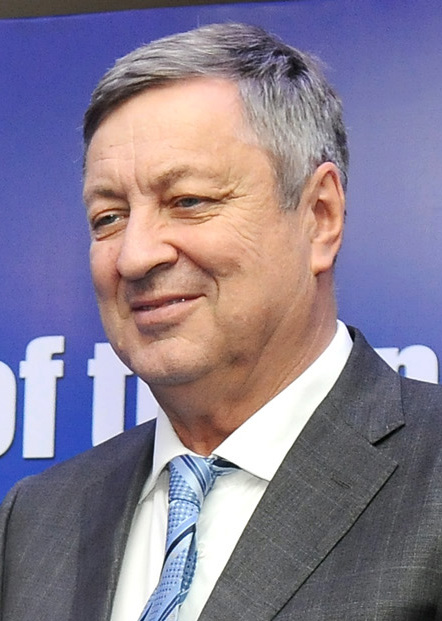
- Shkolnik in 2015

Deputy Prime Minister of Kazakhstan
- In office 13 December 2000 – 29 January 2002
- Prime Minister: Kassym-Jomart Tokayev

Minister of Energy
- In office 6 August 2014 – 25 March 2016
- President: Nursultan Nazarbayev
- Prime Minister: Karim Massimov
- Preceded by: Office established
- Succeeded by: Kanat Bozumbayev

Minister of Industry and Trade
- In office 19 February 2008 – 21 May 2009
- President: Nursultan Nazarbayev
- Prime Minister: Karim Massimov
- Preceded by: Galym Orazbakov
- Succeeded by: Asset Issekeshev
- In office 19 January 2006 – 12 January 2007
- Prime Minister: Daniyal Akhmetov
- Preceded by: Sauat Mynbayev
- Succeeded by: Galym Orazbakov

Minister of Energy and Mineral Resources
- In office 13 December 2000 – 19 January 2006
- President: Nursultan Nazarbayev
- Prime Minister: Kassym-Jomart Tokayev (2000–2002); Imangali Tasmagambetov (2002–2003); Daniyal Akhmetov (2003–2006)
- Preceded by: Office established
- Succeeded by: Baktykozha Izmukhambetov

Minister of Energy, Industry and Trade
- In office 13 October 1999 – 13 December 2000
- President: Nursultan Nazarbayev
- Prime Minister: Kassym-Jomart Tokayev
- Preceded by: Mukhtar Ablyazov
- Succeeded by: Office abolished

Minister of Science and New Technologies
- In office 21 August 1994 – October 1999
- President: Nursultan Nazarbayev
- Prime Minister: Sergey Tereshchenko (1994); Akezhan Kazhegeldin (1994–1997); Nurlan Balgimbayev (1997–1999)
- Preceded by: Galym Abilsiitov
- Succeeded by: Office abolished

Personal details
- Born: 17 February 1949 (age 77) Serpukhov, Russian RSFR, Soviet Union

Vladimir Sergeyevich Shkolnik (Russian: Владимир Сергеевич Школьник; born 17 February 1949) is a Kazakhstani politician who served as the Minister of Industry and Trade in the Government of Kazakhstan until Galym Orazbakov replaced him on 10 January 2007 in a political shakeup. He served as the Minister of Energy and Mineral Resources in 2005.

While serving as the Energy Minister, Shkolnick co-chaired the 2005 Indo-Kazakh Joint Business Council meeting in Astana with Indian petroleum minister Mani Shankar Aiyar. The Times of India reported that the meeting significantly helped to warm India-Kazakhstan relations after the Government of India tried unsuccessfully to gain the right to develop petroleum in the Kurmangazy field.

Shkolnik served a second term as the minister of energy to 27 March 2016, when Kanat Bozumbayev's term started.

== See also ==
- Government of Kazakhstan
