= Shalbay Kulmakhanov =

Minister of Emergency Situations
- In office August 2005 – January 2007
- President: Nursultan Nazarbayev
- Prime Minister: Daniyal Akhmetov
- Preceded by: Muhammed Kopeyev
- Succeeded by: Viktor Khrapunov

Governor of Almaty Region
- In office May 2001 – August 2005
- Preceded by: Zamanbek Nurkadilov
- Succeeded by: Serik Umbetov

Chairman of Committee for Emergency Situations of Kazakhstan
- In office June 1997 – May 2001
- President: Kassym-Jomart Tokayev; Nurlan Balgimbayev
- Preceded by: Nikolay Makievsky
- Succeeded by: Zamanbek Nurkadilov

Mayor of Almaty
- In office June 1994 – June 1997
- First Deputy: Viktor Khrapunov
- Preceded by: Zamanbek Nurkadilov
- Succeeded by: Viktor Khrapunov

Personal details
- Born: Shalbay Kulmakhanovich Kulmakhanov; January 20, 1946 (age 80) Kuygan, Kazakh SSR, Soviet Union

Shalbay Kulmakhanuly Kulmakhanov (Kazakh: Шалбай Құлмаханұлы Құлмаханов, Şalbai Qūlmahanūly Qūlmahanov; born January 20, 1946) served as the mayor of Almaty in Kazakhstan and Minister of Emergency Situations of Kazakhstan until the political shakeup of 2007 when Viktor Khrapunov replaced him.

== See also ==
- Government of Kazakhstan
