= Saint-Petersburg University of the State Fire Service of the EMERCOM of Russia =

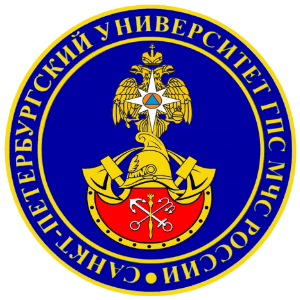
Institute logo

The Saint Petersburg University of the State Fire Service of the Ministry of Emergecny Situations of Russia (Russian: Санкт-Петербургский университет государственной противопожарной службы МЧС России) is a state institution dedicated to training specialists for the Russian Ministry of Emergency Situations. It is currently led by Internal Service Major General Bogdan Gavkalyuk.

== History ==
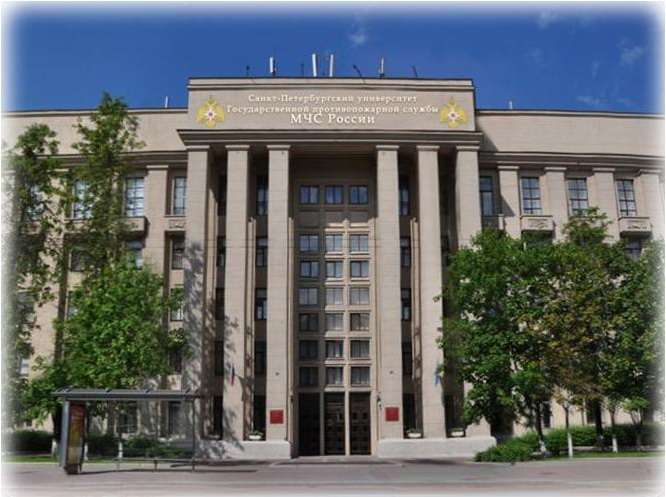
The view of the university from Moskovsky prospect.

The university was established on 5 October 1906 [O.S. 18 October] when the first firefighting courses in the Russian Empire were introduced. Fyodor von Landesen was appointed as the director of the courses. In 1918, a year after the October Revolution, the courses were reformed into the Firefighting Technical School. In 1941, the school was renamed the Second Firefighting Technical School of the Fire Service Troops of the NKVD. On 20 September of that year, the school was disbanded due to the outbreak of the Great Patriotic War. Half of its staff and students served in the Red Army on the front while the rest remained to fight fires within the city limits.

In 1946, the school reopened its doors, renamed the Leningrad Firefighting Technical School. Since 1953, the school has trained firefighters from several countries, including Warsaw Pact nations such as Hungary and Bulgaria, as well as allied countries such as Mongolia, North Korea, Cuba, Afghanistan, Guinea-Bissau, and Vietnam. In total, the school trained over 1,000 specialists from abroad. In 1986, the school was transformed into the Leningrad Higher Firefighting Technical School of the Ministry of Internal Affairs. In 1997, the school was reformed into the Institute of Fire Safety of the Ministry of Internal Affairs of Russia. It became part of the Moscow University of the Ministry of Internal Affairs in 1998. By government resolution, the St. Petersburg Institute of the State Fire Service was established on 13 August 2002. On its centennial in 2006, it was granted university status.

== Structure ==
=== Representative offices ===
The university has representative offices in the following cities:

- Almaty (Kazakhstan)
- Makhachkala
- Syktyvkar
- Strezhevoy
- Ufa
- Sevastopol
- Tyumen
- Niš (Serbia)
- Bar (Montenegro)
- Baku (Azerbaijan)

== Siberian Fire and Rescue Academy ==
On 1 September 2008, the Siberian branch of the university was established in the city of Zheleznogorsk, Krasnoyarsk Krai. It is the only higher educational institution of the Ministry of Emergency Situations beyond the Ural Mountains, serving the regions of Siberia and the Russian Far East. In 2011, it was renamed the Siberian Institute of Fire Safety. On 1 March 2013, the institute became the Siberian Fire and Rescue Academy. Presently, the academy is no longer part of the university and functions as an independent institution. In 2014, its first graduation took place.

== Activities ==
The university's goals are to support the development of a security system in the field of preventing and eliminating the consequences of natural and man-made disasters. One of the major projects in which the university took part was the creation of a research complex called the Vytegra Training and Rescue Center in the Vytegorsky District of the Vologda Region. University cadets undergo additional training outside of curriculum under the "Initial Rescue Training" program, which includes practical training at the rescue center and the university's training complex in the Leningrad Oblast. Since 2008, employees of the fire and rescue services of Jordan, Bahrain, Azerbaijan, Mongolia and Moldova have been trained in the International Civil Defense Organization at the university under advanced training programs. On 16 October 2014, on the occasion of the 70th anniversary of the Liberation of Belgrade, representative office of the university was opened on the basis of the Russian-Serbian Humanitarian Center in the city of Niš. Since 2014, the university has been providing advanced training for specialists from Serbia through the center. On 1 March 2013, a new branch of the university was opened on Russky Island in Vladivostok. The university maintains close ties with fire and rescue schools of Belarus, Germany, Kazakhstan, Canada, United States, France, Finland and other countries. On 1 December 2016, the university was declared a laureate in the nomination "The best educational organization of higher education of the EMERCOM of Russia".

=== Criticism ===
According to a study by Dissernet, there were a number of thesis statements and texts by institute cadets that contained plagiarized content. It also found more than 15 teachers of the university with similar violations in their dissertations.

== Student life ==
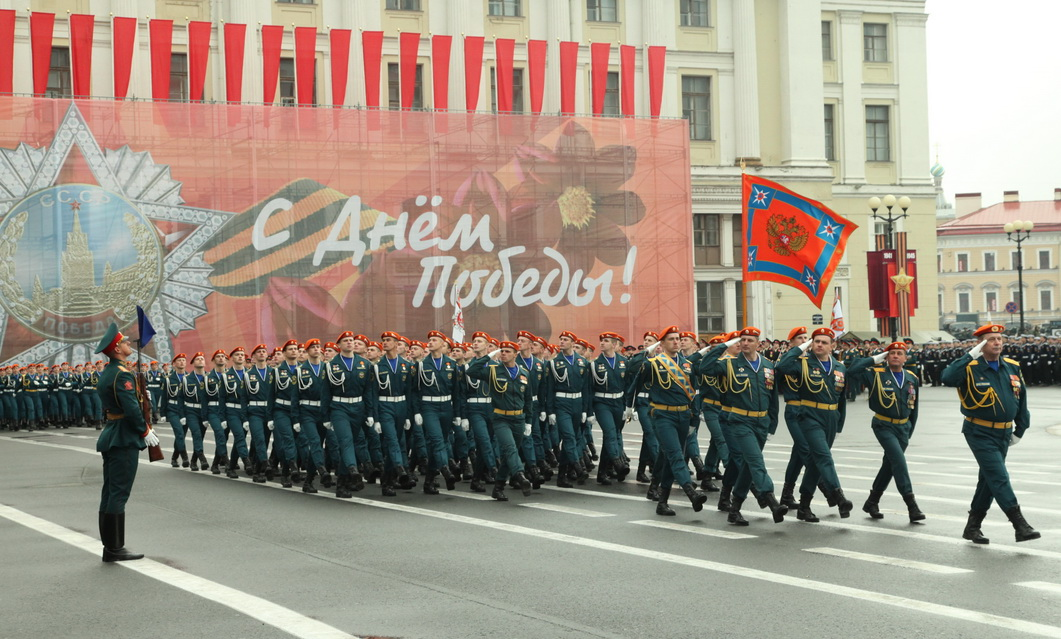
University cadets participating in a 2014 parade.

Cadets are annual participants in Victory Day Parades on Palace Square.

=== Participation in emergency response situations ===
As part of an initiative in 2010, the university began training specialists in high-risk rescue operations, and in 2012 began training cadets with in emergency humanitarian response.

=== Special units/clubs ===
==== Band ====
The school military band participates in events and supports university functions such graduation and sports games.

==== Honour guard ====
The guard of honor platoon is participant in all the university's ceremonial events. At the invitation of various city organizations, it participates in demonstrations and civil/military parades. It is a participants in numerous events in the city of St. Petersburg and the Leningrad Oblast. It is an annual participant in the events for the year in St. Petersburg and Veliky Novgorod. They have also performed at the opening of the hockey championship in the Ice Palace. In 2018, an honour guard was formed at the Siberian academy.

==== Other ====
Ony 13 May 2016, the university hosted a constituent meeting a school based organization called the "Club of Graduates".

=== Sports ===
The university regularly holds championships in:

- Rescue sports
- Mini football
- Chess
- Basketball
- Athletics
- Volleyball
- Kettlebell
- Hockey
- American football
- Cheerleading

Since 2014, the sports club was become a member of the Association of Student Sports Clubs of Russia.

=== Events ===
Among the traditional events at the university is the awarding of "Miss and Mr. St. Petersburg University of the State Fire Service of the Ministry of Emergencies of Russia", in which young men and women representing the educational departments of the university take part.

== Graduates ==
- Viktor Razin, a commander in the 1st Ukrainian Front
- Yevgeny Chernyshov, Head of the Moscow Fire Service
- Sergey Postevoy
- Fyodor Kharitinov, Hero of the Soviet Union
- Oleg Bazhenov, Deputy Minister of EMERCOM

== See also ==
- Civil Defense Academy of the Ministry of Emergency Situations
- Military University of the Ministry of Defense of the Russian Federation
- University of Civil Protection of the Ministry of Emergency Situations (Belarus)
