= Viktor Khrapunov =

Soviet-Kazakh former politician

- Виктор Храпунов

Minister of Emergency Situations
- In office 11 January 2007 – 31 October 2007
- President: Nursultan Nazarbayev
- Prime Minister: Karim Massimov
- Preceded by: Shalbay Kulmakhanov
- Succeeded by: Vladimir Bozhko

Minister of Energy and Natural Resources
- In office 15 March 1995 – 16 June 1997
- President: Nursultan Nazarbayev
- Prime Minister: Akezhan Kazhegeldin
- Preceded by: Vladimir Karmakov (Energy and Coal Industry)
- Succeeded by: Dusembai Duisenov

Äkim of East Kazakhstan Region
- In office 8 December 2004 – 11 January 2007
- Preceded by: Talgatbek Abaidildin
- Succeeded by: Janibek Karibjanov

Äkim of Almaty
- In office 15 June 1997 – 8 December 2004
- Preceded by: Shalbay Kulmakhanov
- Succeeded by: Imangali Tasmagambetov

Personal details
- Born: 24 November 1948 (age 77) Predgornoye, Kazakh SSR, Soviet Union
- Party: Nur Otan (until 2007)
- Spouse: Leil Beketova
- Children: 3
- Education: Oskemen Higher Polytechnic College; Almaty University of Power Engineering and Telecommunications; Higher Party School under CPSU

Viktor Vyacheslavovich Khrapunov (Russian: Виктор Вячеславович Храпунов; born 24 November 1948) is a former Soviet and Kazakh politician who served as an Äkim of Almaty from 16 June 1997 to 9 December 2004, Äkim of East Kazakhstan Region from 9 December 2004 to 11 January 2007, and Minister of Emergency Situations from 11 January to 1 November 2007. Khrapunov has gained notoriety for multiple allegations of fraud, racketeering and laundering of money stolen from the Kazakhstan government. Interpol issued a red notice for the arrest of Khrapunov.

== Early life and career ==
Khrapunov was born in 1948 in the village of Pryedgornoye, in the district of Glubokoye in the northeast of Kazakhstan. Both his parents were civil servants, his father having been severely injured and become an invalid in the Second World War, young Victor moved to Almaty after finishing the College of Industry and Technology in Oskemen. Once in the capital, he started to work first as a repair mechanic, then as a foreman, and later as senior engineer at the Almaty Thermal Power Station during the day, while studying at the Almaty Institute of Electric Technology in the evening.

Kharpunov secured his future career by joining political echelons through the powerful youth league Komsomol. Thereby he obtained the position of chairman of the Almaty Lenin district Communist Party Committee, and was promoted little later to the post of first deputy chair of the Almaty City Council. From there, he moved on to the position of chairman of the Executive Committee of the City Soviet of People's Deputies, which stood under the direct authority of the all-Union Supreme Soviet.

Following the break-up of the USSR and Kazakhstan's subsequent independence, Khrapunov continued his work at the Almaty municipality as first deputy äkim until 1995. After a term in office as minister of energy and coal, and later minister of energy and natural resources. Khrapunov fell victim, following the economic near-crash of 1995/'96, to the downfall of PM Akezhan Kazhegeldin and most of the latter's cabinet, and in 1997 received compensation with the post of mayor of Almaty.

In 2004, Viktor Khrapunov was given the job of Äkim of the East Kazakhstan Region, which he was to carry out till 2007 when he was appointed Minister of Emergency Situations in the country's cabinet. That year, he announced his retreat from all public functions and his retirement, for "health reasons".

== Accusations, charges, prosecution ==
Khrapunov's name has been connected with a vast number of construction and real estate frauds in and around Almaty—in particular involving the now defunct KUAT Holding, which left dozens of residential and commercial space projects unfinished and in a virtual state of bankruptcy. Khrapunov's role, according to later statements on behalf of the judicial authorities, is supposed to have consisted of redrawing frontier lines between plots of land belonging to different property right holders. Together with a number of minor-size operators, KUAT has been held responsible for losses inflicted upon proprietors of apartments and commercial space in the order between 2 and 3 billion US dollars.

Apart from rendering favours to "befriended" project developers, Khrapunov had his own business network, controlled by proxy through nominal ownership by his relatives—still according to judicial investigators. It included a holding named VILED and various of its subsidiaries and affiliated enterprises, as well as a number of nominally independent firms including KazRealIncome LLP and General Realty LLP, both controlled by a certain A. A. Sadykbayeva, Karasha Plus LLP owned by Leyla Khrapunova's sister G. K. Ilyasova and finally Building Service LLP, controlled by Mrs. Khrapunova herself. Through fake privatisations in the form of swaps consisting of capital injections against property rights of public entities, holding assets such as nursery schools, homes for the elderly, orchards and even some parts of natural reserves on the outskirts of Almaty were appropriated by the firms controlled by the Khrapunovs, while other plots were taken through tender leaks.

According to prosecutors' findings sent into the public domain in early 2012, back in 2004, shortly after Viktor Khrapunov had left his job as mayor of Almaty, 46.4 million US dollars and 7.7 million euro were transferred from Leyla Khrapunova's account at the Eurasia Bank, the property of three of Kazakhstan's richest oligarchs Alexander Maskevich, Alizhan Ibrahimov and Patokh Chodiyev, to accounts in unnamed Swiss banks on the name of Elvira Belmadani, alias Elvira Viktorovna Khrapunova, the daughter from the ex-mayor's first marriage. Separately, 5.8 million euro were transferred to accounts in "Italian banks" belonging to unnamed "contractors"—along with 7.5 million US dollars to "other accounts"—equally unspecified. In a parallel transaction, an extra sum of another 7.5 million US dollars was transferred from a company called Elias Import Export LLP for the purchase by Elias of Asia Holding Development LLP. The money transfers uncovered were believed to represent but a small part of the fortune of 300 to 400 million Swiss francs gathered by the Khrapunov family.

Khrapunov is on trial in Kazakhstan for "laundering, embezzlement, abuse of office, fraud and the creation of an organized crime group." The trial began July 2018. Viktor and Leila Khrapunova purchased and quickly resold three condos in the Trump Soho hotel in 2013, and investigators claim that the couple had used the purchases to launder money stolen from the Kazakh government. The couple also had ties to former New York City Mayor Rudy Giuliani.

Yet one more case under investigation as of spring 2012 concerned the construction of a new terminal at Almaty Airport during Khrapunov's time in office. In the course of 2003, the city of Almaty issued a series of 15 promissory notes with a par value of a million US dollars each. Their collateral consisted of stock in a skeleton enterprise, apparently without any benchmark share price but at the same time the nominal holder of the construction contract for the new terminal of the Almaty international airport. The enterprise's name was Delamore Trade and Investment, a subsidiary of Delamore Group, which in turn controlled Imstalkom—the main contractor for the terminal. After the terminal was opened by the end of 2004 after two years of delays, its construction bill turned out to amount of the equivalent of 52 million US dollars rather than the $21 million in the budget. Imstalcom was nominally owned by n enterprise called Kazan To, in turn under control of another company called Phoenix, owned by the Khrapunov family, which later changed its name into Swiss Phoenix Holding SA.

== Relations with Mukhtar Ablyazov ==
Khrapunov and Mukhtar Ablyazov are alleged to have stolen $4 billion from BTA Bank through a complicated web of embezzlement, corrupt deals and offshore shell companies. The two are co-defendants in a suit that they conspired together to launder $40 million of stolen money by investing in New York City real estate deals. Khrapunov is the father-in-law of Ablyazov's daughter, Madina. The UK High Court issued a judgment on Ilyas Khrapunov with a $500 million fine for allegedly aiding Mukhtar Ablyazov violate a court-ordered asset freeze.

== Russian connection ==
Khrapunov used shell companies to purchase three Trump Soho apartments totaling $3.1 million with money allegedly stolen from the government of Kazakhstan. Khrapunov's son sought an injunction in the Netherlands to prevent Zembla from airing a documentary called The Dubious Friends of Donald Trump, which explores the connection between the Khrapunovs, Trump and convicted mobster Felix Sater.

Khrapunov's family had formal business ties to the Bayrock Group managed by former Trump advisor Felix Sater, who is a childhood friend of Michael Cohen, Trump's former personal attorney.

== Evade Arrest via Switzerland ==
In August 2008, a chartered Tupolev Tu-154 with on board a load of 18 tonnes of cargo landed at Geneva Airport. The freight's description on the bill of loading read "personal belongings" of Viktor and Leyla Khrapunov, and reputedly included antiques, jewelry, works of art and other highly valuable items. Added to the money transferred through banking carousels to Switzerland, the Khrapunovs joined their offspring, bringing in a fortune estimated at up to 400 million Swiss francs, or well over a quarter-billion euro, in all—according to the Swiss uppity magazine and local variant to Forbes, Bilan.

On 27 May 2011 the financial police filed two criminal cases against Victor Khrapunov under Part 4, Article 308 of the Criminal Code," a source in the financial police was quoted by Interfax-Kazakhstan in a report published on July 1. "Article 308 of the Criminal Code stipulates liability for abuse of power or official authority, while Part 4 specifies fraudulent actions committed to obtain personal gain and cause other persons or organizations to suffer damages," the news report read. On August 19, news reels reported the start-up of a "criminal investigation" against Khrapunov—without giving any details. In early 2012, Khrapunov's name was added to the Interpol list of wanted persons on request of the government of Kazakhstan.

The accused has denied all allegations. On 11 December 2011, Khrapunov in an interview with Le Temps claimed that his resignation from his post in Almaty had to do with his ideas of the city's industrial and commercial development, which appeared to clash with the national government's concept, accusing the latter of "oligarchism" to the benefit of few elites at the top. He also put Bilan's assessment of his and his family's fortune under question, claiming that the property they possessed in and around Geneva was mortgaged—thereby expressing suspicion that in the magazine's calculation assets had simply been added up to liabilities.

He is currently retired and living in Switzerland.
