= Ministry of Emergency Situations (Kazakhstan) =

Government ministry of Kazakhstan

Ministry of Emergency Situations of the Republic of Kazakhstan
- Қазақстан Республикасы Төтенше жағдайлар министрлігі (Kazakh); Министерство по чрезвычайным ситуациям Республики Казахстан (Russian)
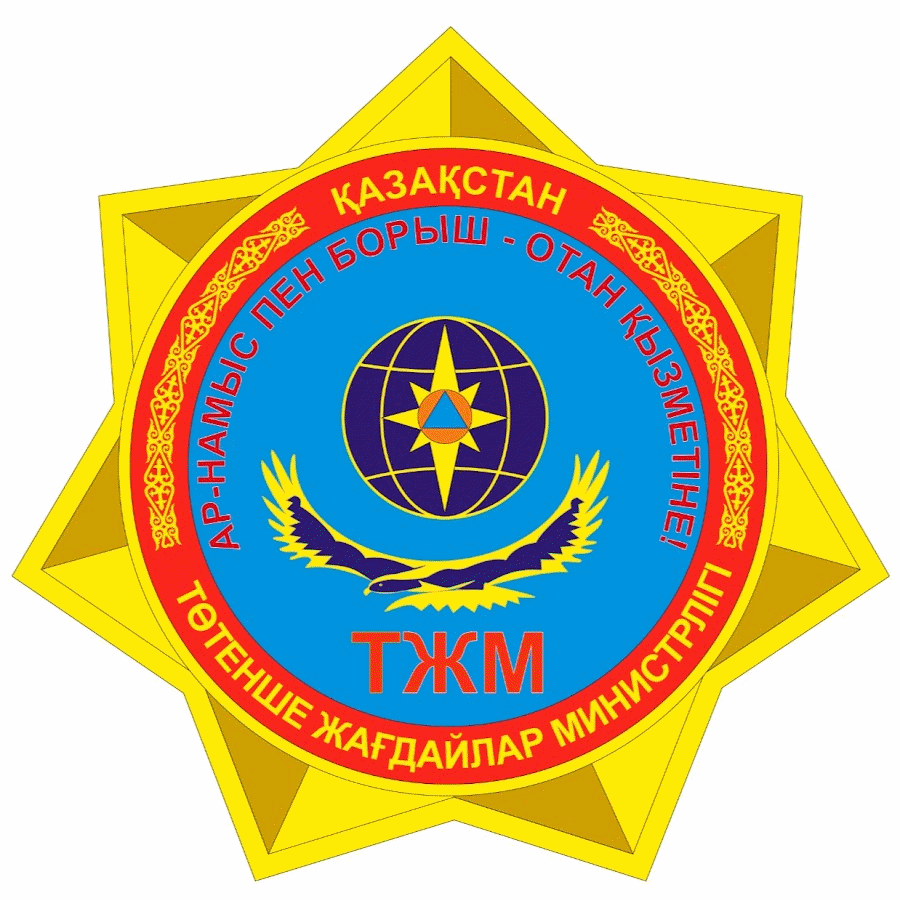
- Ministry Emblem

Agency overview
- Formed: 9 September 2020
- Jurisdiction: President of Kazakhstan
- Headquarters: Mangilik El Avenue, Nur-Sultan
- Minister responsible: Murat Muhanov, Emergencies Minister
- Website: www.emer.gov.kz/ru/

The Ministry of Emergency Situations of the Republic of Kazakhstan (EMER), (Note: Kazakh: Қазақстан Республикасы Төтенше жағдайлар министрлігі, romanized: Qazaqstan Respublikasy Tötenşe jağdaılar ministrlıgı, ҚР ТЖМ; Russian: Министерство по чрезвычайным ситуациям Республики Казахстан, МЧС РК)) formerly known as the Committee for Emergency Situations of Kazakhstan (Note: Kazakh: Төтенше жағдайлар жөніндегі комитеті, romanized: Tötenşe jağdaılar jönındegı komitetı) and also known as the EMERCOM of Kazakhstan, is a government agency overseeing emergency services in Kazakhstan. It is responsible for handling emergencies and natural disasters in Kazakhstan.

== History ==
=== Soviet era ===
Taking into account the lessons of the Chernobyl disaster in 1988, the Soviet Council of Ministers created the Permanent emergency Commission of the USSR on elimination of consequences of accidents and natural disasters. Accordingly, the Council of Ministers of the Kazakh SSR on 17 February 1988 established the Permanent Emergency Commission under the Council of Ministers of the Kazakh SSR. Its members included the heads of ministries and departments, major national organizations.

=== Nationalization ===
On 24 October 1989, the Council of Ministers transformed the Commission into the Commission of the Council of Ministers of the Kazakh SSR for Emergency Situations. President Nursultan Nazarbayev on 21 August recognized the commission as one of the factors of national security. The post of Chairman of EMERCOM was introduced in the Security Council of Kazakhstan and the cabinet, and his/her position is equated to the post of Deputy Chairman of the Council of Ministers. Earlier that June, the regulations of the commission were approved by the government. On 6 August 2014, the ministry was downgraded to the committee level, with its authority being transferred to the Ministry of Internal Affairs of Kazakhstan, with the exception of issues of material reserve and industrial safety. By decree of President Kassym-Jomart Tokayev on 9 September 2020, it became a separate department within the government of the Republic of Kazakhstan.

== Leadership ==
The governmental body changed its status since it gained its independence from USSR. Until now, there have been 8 ministers of the Ministry, with one of them appointed to this position twice.

=== List of ministers/committee chairmen ===
- Nikolay Makievsky (1990 – June 1997)
- Shalbay Kulmakhanov (June 1997 – May 2001)
- Zamanbek Nurkadilov (19 May 2001 – 13 March 2004)
- Nur-Ahmed Bijanov (13 March 2004 – 30 September 2004)
- Muhambet Kopeev (30 September 2004 – August 2005)
- Shalbay Kulmakhanov (11 August 2005 – 11 January 2007)
- Viktor Khrapunov (11 January 2007 – 31 October 2007)
- Vladimir Bozhko (13 November 2007 – 6 August 2014)
- Major General Vladimir Bekker (2014 – 2020)
- Major General Yuri Ilyin (11 September 2020 – 10 June 2023)
- Syrym Sharipkhanov (10 June 2023 – 5 February 2024)
- Chingis Arinov (since 6 February 2024)

== Structure ==
Subordinate services:

- State Control of Emergencies and Industrial Safety of the EMERCOM
- Fire Service
- State Material Reserves

Organizations subordinated to the EMERCOM:

- Civil Defense Forces
- Railway Disaster Medicine Hospitals
- Kazaviaspas
- Kazselezashchita
- Kokshetau Technical Institute of the CoES of the Ministry of Internal Affairs of the Republic of Kazakhstan
- Research Institute of Fire Safety and Civil Defense
- National Scientific and Technical Center for Industrial Safety
- JSC "Research Institute of Fire Safety and Civil Defense" (Өрт сөндіруші)
- Republican Crisis Center
- Republican Training Center for Civil Protection
- Emergency Services
- Center for Disaster Medicine
- Center for Computing, Telecommunications, Informatics and Situation Analysis of the Ministry of Emergencies of the Republic of Kazakhstan
- Central Headquarters of Paramilitary Emergency Services

== See also ==
- Government of Kazakhstan
- Ministry of Emergency Situations (disambiguation)
