= Aqmaral Älnazarova =

Kazakh politician, Minister of Healthcare since 2024

- Ақмарал Әлназарова
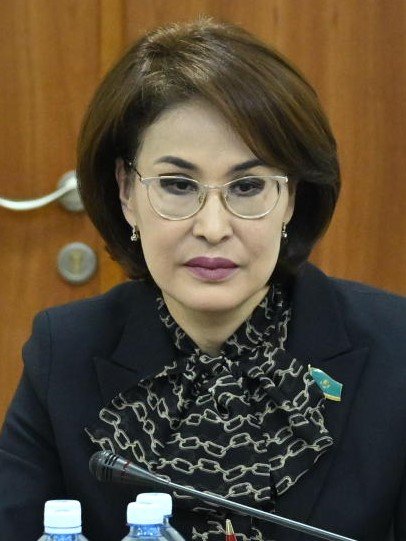
- Älnazarova in 2023

Minister of Healthcare
- Incumbent
- Assumed office 5 February 2024
- President: Kassym-Jomart Tokayev
- Prime Minister: Oljas Bektenov
- Preceded by: Azhar Giniyat

Member of the Senate of Kazakhstan from Kyzylorda Region
- In office 13 August 2020 – 6 February 2024
- President: Kassym-Jomart Tokayev
- Preceded by: Nauryzbai Baiqadamov

Personal details
- Born: 16 February 1971 (age 55) Kyzylorda, Kazakh SSR
- Party: Nur Otan
- Children: 3
- Education: Kazakh National Medical University; Korkyt Ata Kyzylorda University

Aqmaral Sharipbaiqyzy Älnazarova (Kazakh: Ақмарал Шәріпбайқызы Әлназарова, Aqmaral Şärıpbaiqyzy Älnazarova; born 16 February 1971) is a Kazakh pediatrician, and politician, who is currently serving as the Minister of Healthcare since February 2024.

== Biography ==
Älnazarova was born in Kyzylorda, in a family of medical doctors on February 16, 1971. She holds degrees in pediatrics from Almaty State Institute of Medicine and Economics from Korkyt Ata Kyzylorda University. Älnazarova also took a 10-month upskilling course in Healthcare Management (British method) in 2012. She started her career in 1994 as an admissions ward physician at Kyzylorda Public Children's Hospital, and later worked as an associate researcher at the Kyzylorda Branch of the Scientific Center for Pediatrics and Pediatric Surgery. Alnazarova held managerial positions at healthcare institutions in Kyzylorda, including Chief Physician of Kyzylorda Regional Children's Hospital, Head of Kyzylorda Region Healthcare Department, Head of the Regional Department of Kazakhstan's Medical Service Monitoring Committee at the Ministry of Healthcare, and Principal of Kyzylorda College of Medicine. During her tenure, the college launched such new specializations as Laboratory Diagnostics, Hygiene and Epidemiology, Installation, Repairs & Maintenance of Medical Equipment, Medical Optics, Dental Orthopedics.

Between February 2013 and November 2015 Alnazarova served as a Deputy Akim and Head of Healthcare Department of the Kyzylorda Region. Akmaral held the position of First Deputy Chairman of the Kyzylorda Regional Branch of Nur Otan party, now Amanat, between April 2019 and June 2020. Elected to the Senate of the Republic of Kazakhstan in August 2020 as a representative of the Kyzylorda Region, she worked there successfully until 2024. Älnazarova was appointed Minister of Healthcare of the Republic of Kazakhstan on February 6, 2024.

== Awards ==
- Medal "10 years of Astana" (2008).
- Excellence in Healthcare badge (awarded by Kazakhstan's Ministry of Healthcare in 2008).
- Medal for contribution to healthcare and longstanding dedicated work.
- Order of Kurmet (December 5, 2016).
- Medal 30 Years of Independence of the Republic of Kazakhstan (2021).
- For Contribution to the Development of Healthcare in the Republic of Kazakhstan badge (awarded by the Ministry of Healthcare).
- Order of Parasat (October 24, 2023).
