= Kassym-Jomart Tokayev =

President of Kazakhstan since 2019

- Қасым-Жомарт Тоқаев
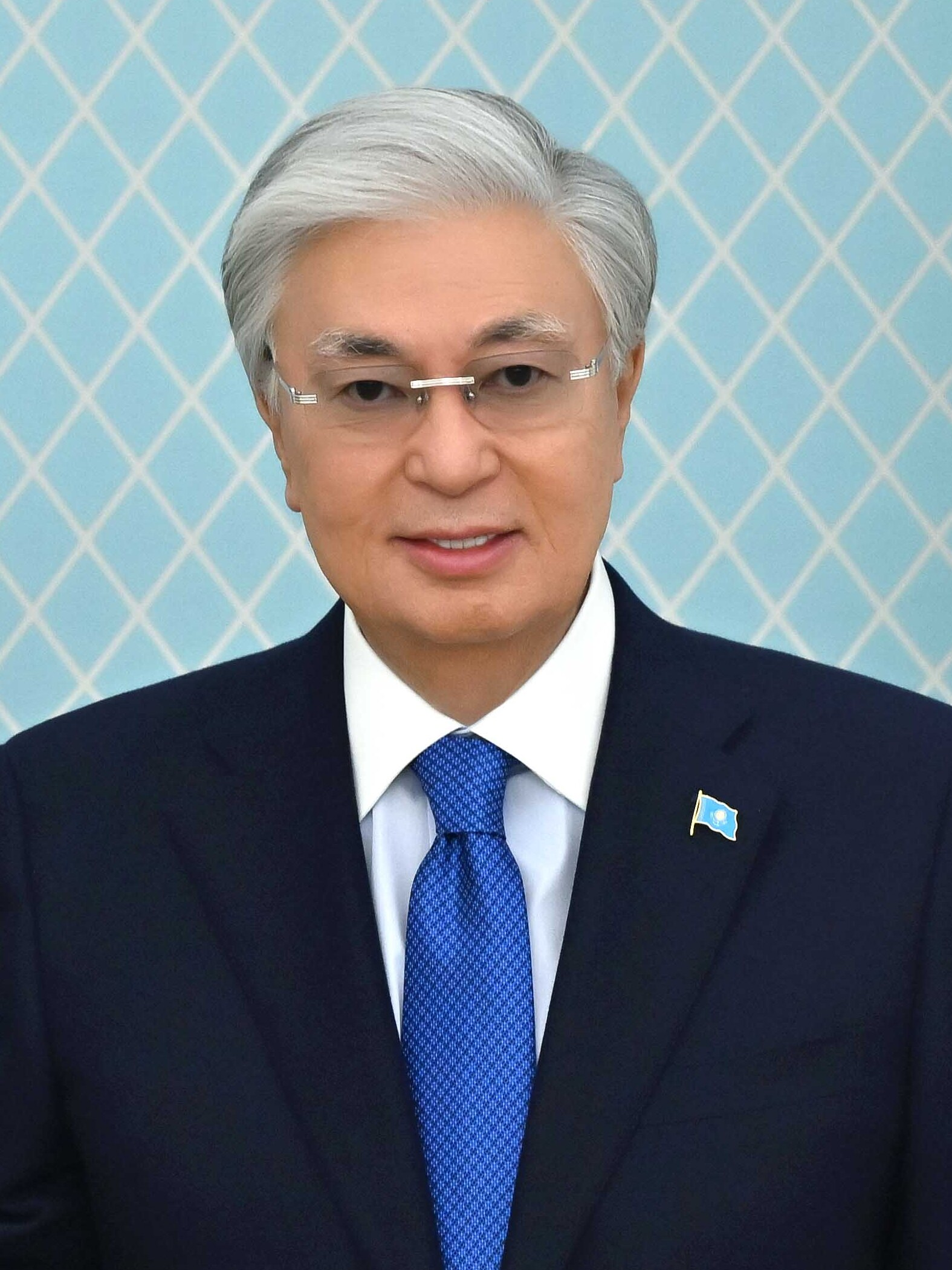
- Tokayev in 2026

2nd President of Kazakhstan
- Incumbent
- Assumed office 12 June 2019; Acting: 20 March – 12 June 2019
- Prime Minister: Asqar Mamin; Alihan Smaiylov; Roman Sklyar (acting); Oljas Bektenov
- Vice President: Erlan Karin (since 2026)
- Preceded by: Nursultan Nazarbayev

Chairman of the Assembly of People
- In office 28 April 2021 – 1 July 2026
- Preceded by: Nursultan Nazarbayev
- Succeeded by: Office abolished (Erlan Qoşanov as chairman of People's Council of Kazakhstan)

Chairman of Amanat (Note: As Chairman of Nur Oltan until 1 March 2022.)
- In office 28 January 2022 – 26 April 2022
- Preceded by: Nursultan Nazarbayev
- Succeeded by: Erlan Qoşanov
Senior political posts
4th Prime Minister of Kazakhstan
In office 1 October 1999 (Note: Acting: 1–12 October 1999) – 28 January 2002
President	Nursultan Nazarbayev
First Deputy	Aleksandr Pavlov; Daniyal Akhmetov
Preceded by	Nurlan Balgimbayev
Succeeded by	Imangali Tasmagambetov
Deputy Prime Minister of Kazakhstan
In office 15 March 1999 – 1 October 1999 Serving with Oraz Jandosov
Prime Minister	Nurlan Balgimbayev
State Secretary of Kazakhstan
In office 29 January 2002 – 13 June 2003
President	Nursultan Nazarbayev
Preceded by	Abish Kekilbayev
Succeeded by	Imangali Tasmagambetov
Senate positions
4th and 6th Chair of the Senate
In office 16 October 2013 – 19 March 2019
Deputy	Qairat Işçanov; Asqar Beisenbaev; Sergey Gromov; Bektas Beknazarov
Preceded by	Kairat Mami
Succeeded by	Dariga Nazarbayeva
In office 11 January 2007 – 15 April 2011
Deputy	Muhambet Kopeev; Aleksandr Sudin
Preceded by	Nurtai Abykayev
Succeeded by	Kairat Mami
Member of the Senate
In office 16 October 2013 – 19 March 2019
Appointed by	Nursultan Nazarbayev
In office 11 January 2007 – 15 April 2011
Diplomatic positions
Minister of Foreign Affairs
In office 29 January 2002 – 11 January 2007
Prime Minister	Imangali Tasmagambetov; Daniyal Akhmetov; Karim Massimov
Preceded by	Erlan Idrissov
Succeeded by	Marat Tajin
In office 13 October 1994 – 12 October 1999
Prime Minister	Akejan Kajegeldin; Nurlan Balgimbayev
Preceded by	Kanat Saudabayev
Succeeded by	Erlan Idrissov
11th Director-General of the United Nations Office at Geneva
In office 12 March 2011 – 16 October 2013
Preceded by	Sergei Ordzhonikidze
Succeeded by	Michael Møller

Personal details
- Born: Kassym-Zhomart Kemelevich Tokayev; 17 May 1953 (age 73) Alma-Ata, Kazakh SSR, Soviet Union (now Almaty, Kazakhstan)
- Party: Independent (1991–1999, 2022–present)
- Other political affiliations: CPSU (before 1991); Amanat (1999–2022)
- Spouse: Nadezhda Tokayeva (div. 2019)
- Children: 1
- Education: Moscow State Institute of International Relations; Beijing Language and Culture University

Kassym-Jomart Kemeluly Tokayev (Note: Kazakh: Қасым-Жомарт Кемелұлы Тоқаев, Qasym-Jomart Kemelūly Toqaev, Kazakh: [qɑˈsəm ʒoˈmɑrt kʲeˌmʲeɫʊˈɫɤ toˈqɑjɪf]; Russian: Касым-Жомарт Кемелевич Токаев, romanized: Kasym-Zhomart Kemelevich Tokayev) (born 17 May 1953) is a Kazakh politician and diplomat who has served as the second president of Kazakhstan since 2019. He previously served as Prime Minister from 1999 to 2002 and as Chairman of the Senate from 2007 to 2011 and again from 2013 to 2019. Tokayev also held the position of Director-General of the United Nations Office at Geneva from 2011 to 2013.

Born in Alma-Ata (now Almaty), Tokayev studied at the Moscow State Institute of International Relations and later trained at diplomatic institutions in China. He began his career in the Soviet Ministry of Foreign Affairs before joining Kazakhstan's foreign service after independence in 1991. Tokayev twice served as foreign minister, from 1994 to 1999 and 2002 to 2007, as well as state secretary from 2002 to 2003, playing a key role in shaping Kazakhstan's foreign policy and its nuclear disarmament policies.

In March 2019, Tokayev became acting president following the resignation of Nursultan Nazarbayev. In June that year, he won the first round of a snap presidential election as the candidate of the ruling Nur Otan party. His presidency has included various economic initiatives and a shift toward political reforms. In January 2022, large-scale protests over fuel prices escalated into violent unrest, prompting Tokayev to declare a state of emergency and request peacekeeping assistance from the CSTO. The subsequent crackdown resulted in casualties and mass arrests. Following the crisis, he distanced himself from Nazarbayev, removed key figures associated with the former leader, and implemented constitutional changes, including reducing presidential terms. In 2022, Tokayev was re-elected in a snap presidential election, winning 81% of the vote in the first round. He ran as an independent candidate with the support of People's Coalition after leaving the Amanat (formerly Nur Otan) party, positioning himself as a reformist. His administration has focused on political restructuring, economic modernization, and maintaining a multi-vector foreign policy, balancing relations with Russia, China, and the West.

Despite advocating political modernization, Tokayev's government has faced criticism for restricting opposition parties, limiting press freedoms, and suppressing protests. In 2022, leaked financial records revealed that his family had held offshore assets since at least 1998.

== Early life and education ==
Tokayev (Kazakh pronunciation) was born into a prominent Kazakh family in the city of Alma-Ata (now Almaty). His father, Kemel Tokayev (1923–1986), a World War II veteran and renowned writer, is considered the founder of Kazakh detective fiction. His mother, Turar Shabarbayeva (1931–2000), worked at the Alma-Ata Institute of Foreign Languages. Kemel Tokayev later received a medal for his contributions to the development of the Virgin Lands campaign after the war.

Tokayev spent part of his childhood in the village of Kälpe, Karatal District, in the Jetisu Region, where his family had deep roots. In 1970, Tokayev enrolled in the Moscow State Institute of International Relations, where he studied Mandarin. During his fifth year, he was sent to the Soviet embassy in China for a six-month training course.

== Early career ==
Upon graduating from the Moscow State Institute of International Relations in 1975, Tokayev joined the Soviet Ministry of Foreign Affairs and was posted to the Soviet Embassy in Singapore.

In 1979, Tokayev returned to the Soviet Ministry of Foreign Affairs. In 1983, he attended training courses at the Beijing Language Institute in China. From 1984 to 1991, he served in various diplomatic roles at the Soviet embassy in Beijing, including Second Secretary, First Secretary, and Counsellor. In 1991, he enrolled at the Soviet Diplomatic Academy in Moscow to further his diplomatic training.

== Political career ==
=== Deputy foreign minister (1992–1994) ===
In March 1992, Tokayev was appointed a deputy foreign minister of the Republic of Kazakhstan. From there, he briefly took stance against nuclear disarmament in the former Soviet republics of Belarus and Ukraine under pressure by Russia, letting negotiations to be held under the United Nations Security Council, writing it as "a significant success of Kazakh diplomacy, which was taking its first steps in the international arena, opened the way for further negotiations with all influential states at the highest level."

In 1993, he became the first deputy foreign minister and on 13 October 1994, Tokayev was appointed to the post of Minister of Foreign Affairs.

In March 1999, Kassym-Jomart Tokayev was appointed Deputy Prime Minister of Kazakhstan.

=== Prime Minister of Kazakhstan (1999–2002) ===
On 12 October 1999, with the endorsement of the Parliament of Kazakhstan, he was appointed Prime Minister of Kazakhstan by decree of President Nursultan Nazarbayev. Upon assuming office, Tokayev's government placed a strong emphasis on the agricultural sector. He cautioned against introducing legislation on land privatization too early. Additionally, Tokayev outlined several key areas of focus for the government, including the development of sports, the timely payment of pensions, and providing support for domestic producers.

Under Tokayev's leadership, Kazakhstan's economy showed significant growth, with GDP expanding by 13.5% in 2001, while inflation was successfully reduced by 11.2%. However, in November 2001, during an interview with Khabar Agency, Tokayev threatened to resign unless Nazarbayev took action against certain government officials whom he accused of undermining the executive branch and obstructing necessary democratic reforms. As a result of this pressure, six cabinet members were dismissed, including Deputy Prime Minister Oraz Jandosov, Minister of Labour and Social Protection Alikhan Baimenov, Pavlodar Region akim Galymzhan Zhakiyanov, and Deputy Defense Minister Janat Ertlesova.

On 28 January 2002, Tokayev resigned as prime minister, citing the centralization of power under the strong presidential system as the reason for his resignation. He was subsequently appointed as State Secretary and Minister of Foreign Affairs, where he continued to play a key role in shaping Kazakhstan's foreign policy.

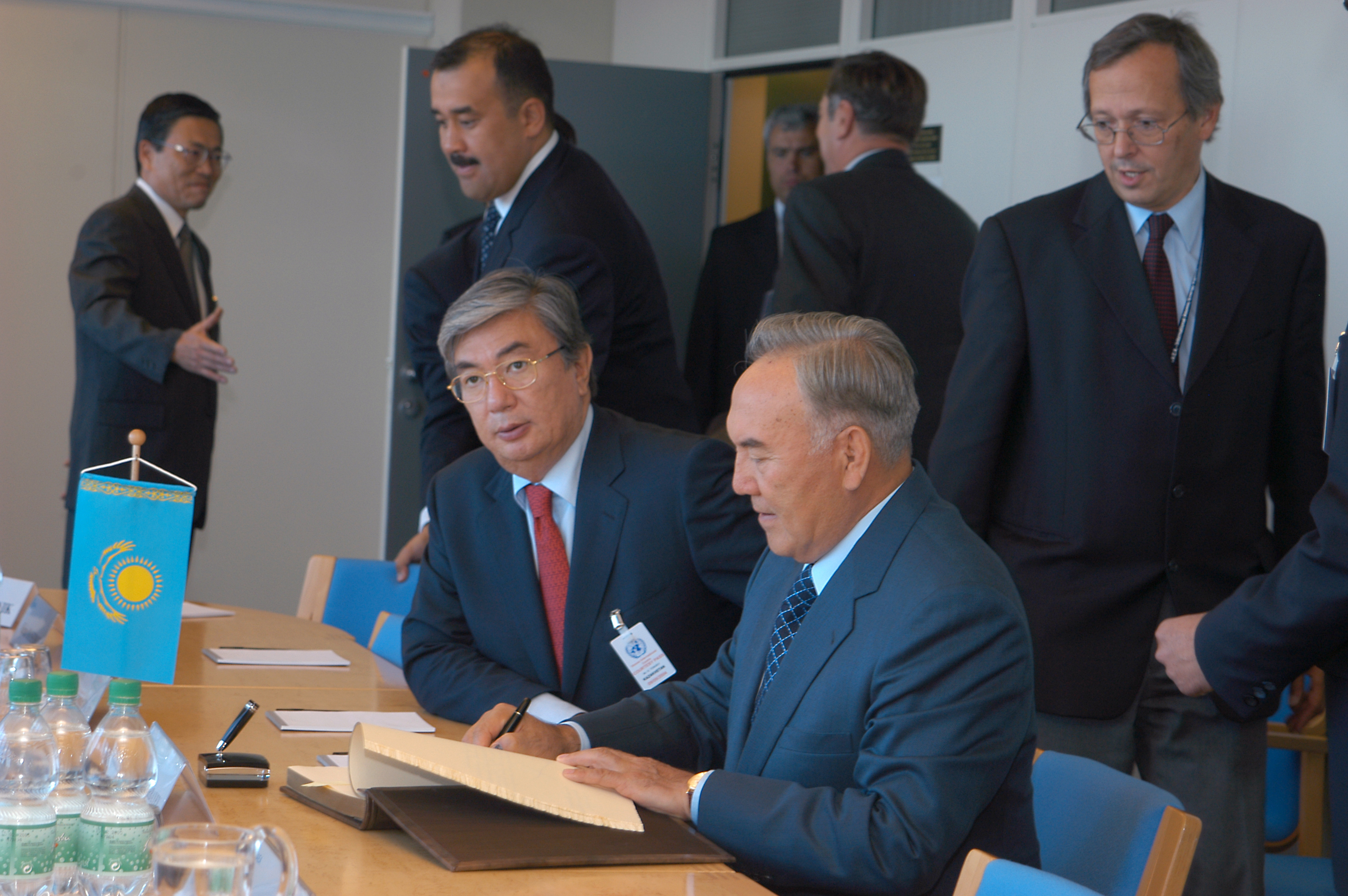
Tokayev with President Nursultan Nazarbayev (right) during a visit to the International Atomic Energy Agency in Vienna, Austria, September 2004

=== Foreign minister and state secretary (1994–1999, 2002–2007) ===
As a minister of foreign affairs, Tokayev played an active role in nuclear non-proliferation. In 1995 and 2005, he participated in the Review Conferences for the Treaty on the Non-Proliferation of Nuclear Weapons (NPT) in New York City. In 1996, he signed the Comprehensive Nuclear-Test-Ban Treaty (CTBT) in New York, and in 2005 the Treaty on a Nuclear-Weapons-Free Zone in Central Asia (CANWFZ) in Semipalatinsk.

He was elected Chairman of the Council of Foreign Ministers of the Commonwealth of Independent States and of the Shanghai Cooperation Organisation. Tokayev took part in ten sessions of the United Nations General Assembly. He held a diplomatic rank of Ambassador Extraordinary and Plenipotentiary.

On 28 March 2003, Tokayev expressed support for the US invasion of Iraq, citing concerns over Saddam Hussein's potential development of weapons of mass destruction.

Throughout his tenure, Tokayev pursued a multi-vector foreign policy, balancing Kazakhstan's relations with Russia, China, and the West. His diplomatic efforts helped Kazakhstan avoid confrontations with other states, instead fostering cooperation and promoting stability both regionally and globally.

=== Chairman of the Senate (2007–2011, 2013–2019) ===
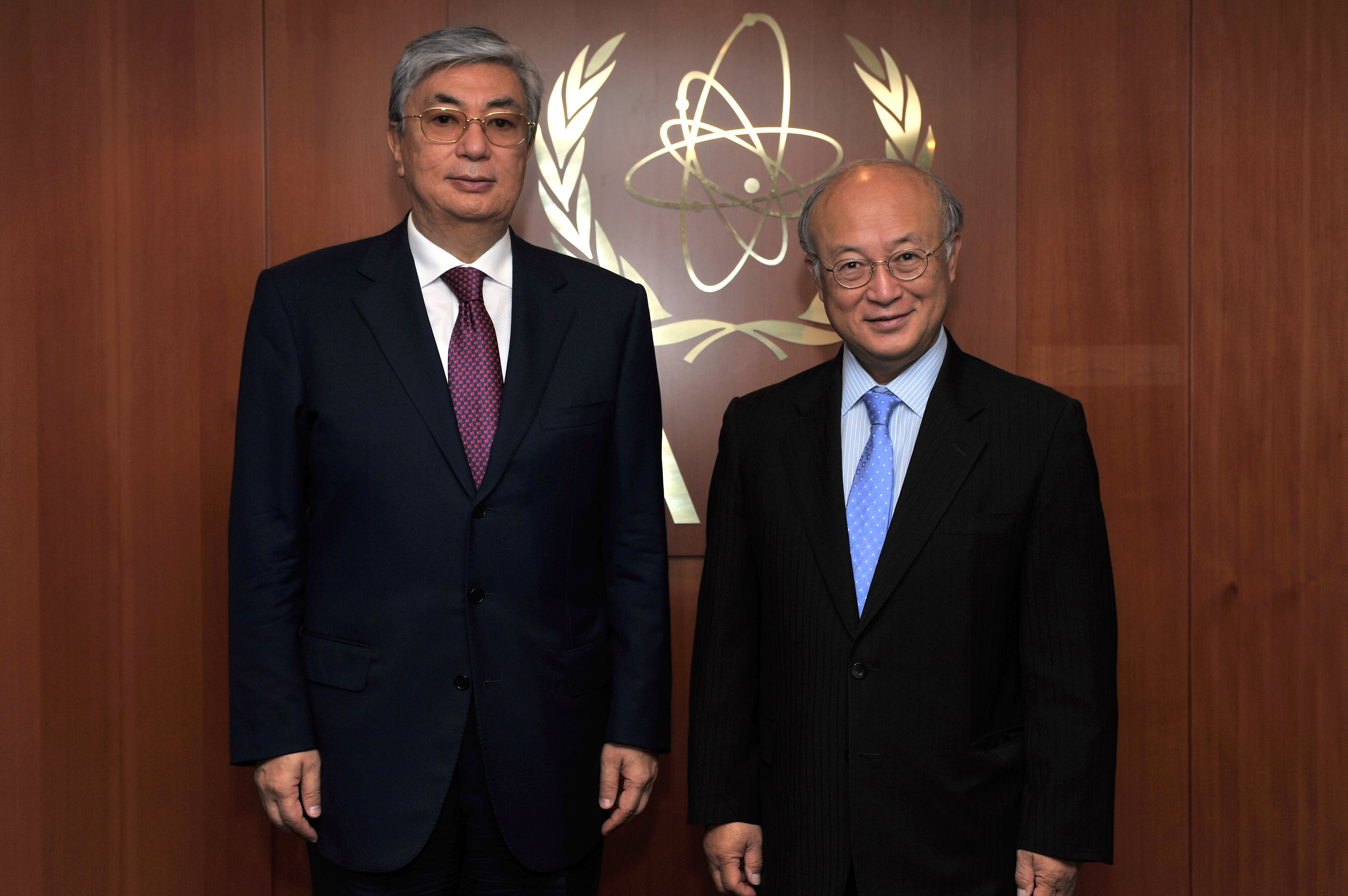
Kassym-Jomart Tokayev with Yukiya Amano

On 11 January 2007, Tokayev was appointed as a deputy of the Senate of Kazakhstan by Nursultan Nazarbayev. He was elected as Chairman of the Senate by the Senate deputies.

He served the post until being relieved on 15 April 2011 after being appointed Director-General of the United Nations. President Nazarbayev expressed his gratitude towards Tokayev, stating that he's "absolutely committed to the path of reforms that I am pursuing."

On 16 October 2013, he was reappointed again as the Senate Chair and was unanimously confirmed by the Senate MPs.

During the 2016 Protests against land reforms in Kazakhstan, Tokayev stressed the issue of land lease to be dealt with in a critical matter.

During an interview with BBC News in June 2018, Tokayev hinted at the possibility of Nazarbayev's succession by expressing his belief that he wouldn't run for re-election as his presidential term was to end in 2020.

=== Vice-President of the OSCE PA ===
While serving as a deputy of the Senate, Tokayev was elected Vice-President of the Parliamentary Assembly of the Organization for Security and Co-operation in Europe (OSCE PA) during its 31st Annual Session in Astana on 3 July 2008. From there, he played a key part in international parliamentary diplomacy, election monitoring, and regional security discussions. Tokayev contributed to OSCE PA initiatives, including serving as deputy head of the election observation mission under Tony Lloyd to Belarus during the 2010 presidential election, which raised concerns about electoral transparency and human rights violations.

Tokayev also prioritized trans-regional cooperation, particularly in addressing security challenges in Central Asia, such as the unrest in Kyrgyzstan and the conflict in Afghanistan. He advocated for stronger OSCE engagement in the region and efforts to enhance stability. His leadership was instrumental in hosting key OSCE PA events in Kazakhstan, including the 2010 Trans-Asian Parliamentary Forum in Almaty, where Tokayev reinforced Kazakhstan's commitment to international cooperation and parliamentary diplomacy.

=== Director-General of the UN Office at Geneva ===
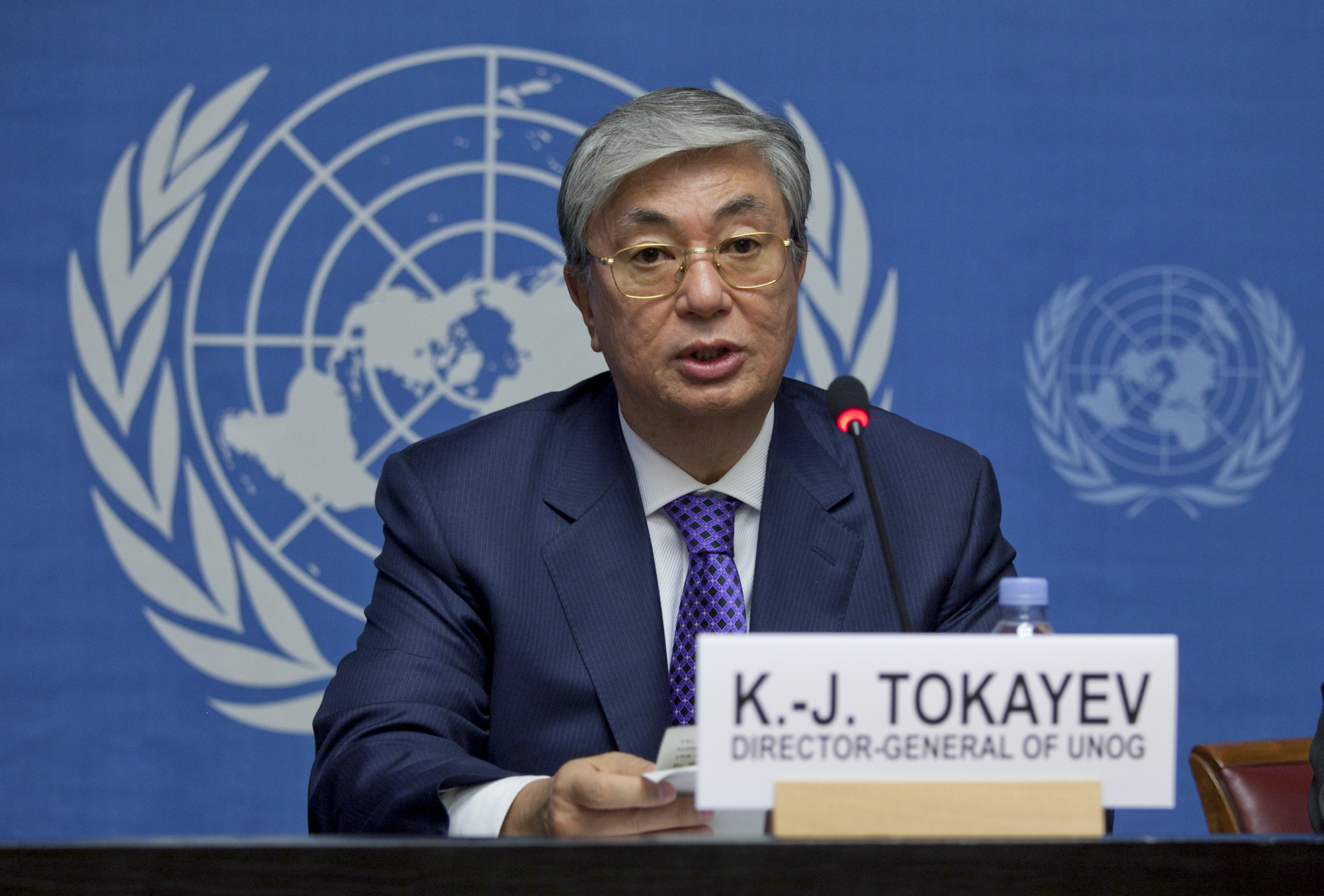
Tokayev speaking at the United Nations Economic Commission for Europe, October 2012

In March 2011, the Secretary-General of the United Nations, Ban Ki-moon, announced the appointment of Tokayev to succeed Sergei Ordzhonikidze as the Under-Secretary-General and Director-General of the United Nations Office at Geneva, a hub for the UN's international diplomatic and humanitarian work, citing his experience at senior government levels, his knowledge of the Conference on Disarmament (CD) and his management expertise. With this appointment, Tokayev was the first Asian representative to hold the position.

Tokayev was appointed as the Personal Representative of the United Nations Secretary-General to the CD, a body for negotiating international arms control and disarmament agreements. During his leadership, he navigated financial challenges, implemented reforms to improve efficiency, and ensured the office's continued effectiveness. He worked to overcome the deadlock on critical disarmament issues, including the Fissile Material Cut-off Treaty, proposing in February 2012 procedural reforms such as extending the presidency duration and expanding membership. Tokayev emphasized the need for political will and urgent action to revitalize the CD and advance global disarmament efforts. His tenure also saw his participation in the 2012 Nuclear Security Summit in Seoul, where he highlighted Kazakhstan's commitment to nuclear disarmament and global security.

Tokayev's tenure was marked by his efforts to promote Geneva as a diplomatic hub on issues such as human rights, global health, economic cooperation, and climate change for international dialogue as well as addressing conflicts, such as the Syrian civil war, and territorial disputes. He supported UN reforms, including Secretary-General Ban Ki-moon's initiatives to reduce administrative costs and enhance transparency in UN operations, aligning with his broader goal of maintaining the UN Office's effectiveness.

Following his appointment as Chairman of the Senate, Tokayev stepped down as Director-General of the UN Office in Geneva and was succeeded by Michael Møller on 5 November 2013.

== Presidency ==
=== Acting president ===
On 19 March 2019, then-President Nursultan Nazarbayev announced his resignation. According to the Constitution of Kazakhstan, in case of early termination of powers, the Senate chairman becomes the acting president until the end of the previous term. On 20 March, Tokayev officially took office as president.

Immediately upon assuming office, Tokayev proposed renaming the capital city of Kazakhstan after his predecessor, and the same day the Parliament of Kazakhstan approved the renaming of Astana to Nur-Sultan.

During his first weeks in office, Tokayev took trips across regions, meeting with various groups, and emphasized the importance of political stability, socio-economic development, and alignment with Nazarbayev's legacy. He focused on ensuring continuity and stability in Kazakhstan's policies, while addressing new global challenges.

==== 2019 snap presidential election ====
On 9 April 2019, Tokayev signed a decree scheduling snap presidential elections to be held on 9 June. He pledged electoral transparency and emphasized that Kazakhstan is a democratic state, asserting that a president should be elected according to the "will of the people" to eliminate political uncertainty.

Tokayev became a presidential candidate after being nominated by the ruling Nur Otan party on 23 April 2019, with the endorsement of party chairman and former president Nursultan Nazarbayev. His campaign focused on continuing existing policies, ensuring justice, and promoting progress. A key part of his platform was maintaining Nazarbayev's legacy, which Tokayev cited as his reason for running. During the campaign, Tokayev was mocked on social media for using photo manipulation software to remove wrinkles and his double chin from official photos.

On 9 June 2019, Tokayev was elected president of Kazakhstan with 71% of the popular vote in the first round. His victory was acknowledged by several foreign leaders, including Xi Jinping, Ilham Aliyev, Recep Tayyip Erdogan, Emomali Rahmon, and Sooronbay Jeenbekov. However, the election was marked by protests, with security forces detaining thousands of demonstrators in major cities such as Nur-Sultan and Almaty. The Organization for Security and Co-operation in Europe (OSCE) criticized the election, stating that it lacked genuine pluralism and was marred by irregularities, including ballot stuffing and restrictions on freedom of assembly.

=== Early years ===
After being elected in the 2019 Kazakh presidential election, Tokayev was fully sworn in as Kazakhstan's second president on 12 June 2019 at the Palace of Independence in Nur-Sultan, which was attended by high-ranking Kazakh officials, including former president Nazarbayev himself. From there, Tokayev addressed the nation that he would serve the nation's citizens fairly, embarking that "different opinions, united nation" would be a slogan of his presidency.

In June 2019, following a military ammo deposit blast in the town of Arys which resulted in evacuations of residents and hundreds of injuries, Tokayev launched a criminal case and ordered the Interior and Defence ministries to prevent possible more explosions, pledging that any perpetrators would be prosecuted. Tokayev paid visit to the town on 25 June, touring buildings that were affected by the blast as well as meeting with hospitalised victims.

Tokayev delivered his first State of the Nation Address on 2 September 2019. The address focused on strengthening civil society and social security, supporting domestic business and economic development.

After the Bek Air Flight 2100 crash, Tokayev declared the following day, 28 December 2019, a national day of mourning and said that "all those responsible will be severely punished in accordance with the law." He also ordered the suspension of the flight authorisation of Bek Air, the domestic airline involved.

Following the Dungan–Kazakh ethnic clashes which broke out in February 2020, Tokayev fired the governor, deputy governor and police chief of the southern Jambyl Region. Tokayev blamed "two criminal groups" fighting over contraband for the deadly ethnic violence between ethnic Kazakhs and the relatively wealthier Dungan minority.

In an interview to Informburo news agency, Tokayev commented on the fate of Mukhtar Dzhakishev, saying "this issue is exclusively within the competence of the court. Of course, I am aware that Dzhakishev has repeatedly applied for parole on ill-health. The session of the court of first instance will be held on 3 March. Let's wait for its decision, which I am sure will be fair." On 3 March 2020, the Semey City Court upheld the motion to grant parole to Dzhakishev. He has served a 14-year prison sentence since 2009.

In his second State of the Nation Address on 1 September 2020, Tokayev discussed seven reforms with a focus on economic recovery. From there, he spoke of optimizing Kazakhstan's social system, increasing productivity and a greener economy, leveling business conditions, investing more in education and overseeing the state's administration as it becomes more sensitive and accountable.

==== Relationship with Nazarbayev ====
In the early years of his presidency, Tokayev governed under the significant influence of Nursultan Nazarbayev, who continued to hold key positions, including the chairmanship of the Security Council, the ruling Nur Otan party, and the Assembly of People of Kazakhstan (QHA). Additionally, Dariga Nazarbayeva’s appointment as Senate Chairwoman positioned her as Tokayev's constitutional successor, which contributed to the perception of a dual power structure.

In October 2019, Tokayev signed a decree stipulating that ministerial appointments required Nazarbayev's approval, with the exception of the ministers of defense, interior, and foreign affairs. This move further underscored Nazarbayev's continued influence over key governmental decisions. However, in May 2020, Tokayev dismissed Dariga Nazarbayeva from her position as Senate Chairwoman, signaling a potential shift in the balance of power and fueling speculation about Tokayev's increasing political independence.

Throughout this period, Tokayev rejected the notion of a dual power structure, emphasizing that there was no diarchy between himself and Nazarbayev. He asserted that while he occasionally sought advice from Nazarbayev, he was the legitimately elected head of state and that there were no contradictions in his exercise of presidential authority.

Nazarbayev's gradual retreat from the political scene became more evident on 28 April 2021, when he resigned from the chairmanship of the QHA and nominated Tokayev as his successor. By November 2021, Nazarbayev officially ceded leadership of the Nur Otan party to Tokayev, thus consolidating Tokayev's control over both the presidency and the ruling party.

==== Abolition of capital punishment ====
Tokayev played a key role in Kazakhstan's decision to abolish the death penalty, a move shaped by domestic human rights advocacy and international commitments. In December 2019, he announced the country's intention to join the Second Optional Protocol to the International Covenant on Civil and Political Rights, responding to concerns raised by Kazakh human rights activists and experts during discussions at the National Council of Public Trust. He directed the Ministry of Foreign Affairs to initiate the process of accession, setting the stage for legislative changes.

Addressing the United Nations General Assembly in 2020, Tokayev framed the decision as a step toward fulfilling "a fundamental right to life and human dignity." Shortly after, on 23 September 2020, Kazakhstan's representative to the UN, Kairat Umarov, formally signed the protocol. The Parliament ratified the document on 29 December 2020, and on 2 January 2021, Tokayev signed the decree officially abolishing the death penalty.

==== 2021 legislative elections ====
In autumn 2020, Tokayev announced the date for the 2021 legislative elections, where he asserted that the electoral and political process had been liberalised to allow for greater involvement in civil society and that the newly incoming parliament convocation would focus on support for socio-economic reforms. During election day, Tokayev said that the government would resign in accordance with law and that he would consult with newly elected deputies and party leaders regarding the appointments of prime minister and cabinet members.

In the aftermath of vote, the ruling Nur Otan despite losing dozen seats, topped the results in which the Organization for Security and Co-operation in Europe (OSCE) citied that the elections "lacked genuine competition". At the opening session of the 7th Parliament held on 15 January 2021, Tokayev reappointed Asqar Mamin as the prime minister.

==== Domestic policy ====
Tokayev outlined the main directions for Kazakhstan, which were increasing the incomes of the population, eradication of corruption, judicial reforms, creating new jobs with decent wages, solving housing issues, fair social policies, regional developments, spirituality, foreign national interests and youth opportunities. In his first month of presidency, Tokayev made several reorganisations and appointments within the administration and the ministerial cabinet with some top officials such as Presidential Administration head Bakhytzhan Sagintayev and National Security Committee chairman Karim Massimov keeping their posts while others being reshuffled or forced to stepped down.

==== Economic reforms ====
Tokayev has emphasized economic equity, advocating for a fair distribution of national income, which he described as "strategically important" for Kazakhstan. Early in his presidency, he took steps to enhance trade and economic growth, establishing the Ministry of Trade and Integration in June 2019 and appointing Bakhyt Sultanov as its head. The Ministry was tasked with boosting exports, a key driver of job creation and economic expansion.

In response to financial difficulties faced by citizens, Tokayev prioritized wage increases and debt relief. In a national address, he announced a raise in the minimum wage—the first since 2018—from 42,500 to 60,000 ₸, effective 1 January 2022. He framed this decision as a necessary step to stimulate domestic consumption amid the financial strain caused by the COVID-19 pandemic. To further support workers, he urged businesses to increase salaries and pledged state-backed incentives to facilitate wage growth.

Tokayev also pursued social support policies aimed at relieving personal debt. In an interview with Bloomberg News, he outlined an initiative to assist citizens in extreme financial hardship, ultimately benefitting 16% of Kazakhstan's population. Rejecting government bailouts for banks, he instead signed a decree on 26 June 2019 directing the government and National Bank to begin decommissioning unsecured consumer loans, signaling a shift toward financial self-reliance.

His administration also focused on economic governance and structural reforms. In January 2020, Tokayev initiated the formation of the Centre for Analysis and Monitoring of Socio-Economic Reforms, later evolving into the Presidential Reform Agency. That same month, he called for stricter registration policies for cars imported from the Eurasian Economic Union (EAEU), despite protests from vehicle owners with foreign plates.

The economic challenges brought by the COVID-19 pandemic prompted further government intervention. In March 2020, Tokayev directed the government to develop an anti-crisis plan to uphold social obligations. The plan introduced tax incentives, subsidized credit, and employment support to ease the burden on the private sector. However, as inflation surged, public dissatisfaction grew. Tokayev criticized the government and central bank for their inaction, calling for a reduction in inflation to 2–4% and attributing the rise in prices to an excess money supply generated by pandemic relief measures.

==== Credit amnesty ====
On 26 June 2019, the President signed a Decree "On Measures to Reduce the Debt Burden of Citizens of the Republic of Kazakhstan" to provide timely assistance to citizens with financial difficulties. The credit amnesty was a one-time measure and affected families with many children, disabled people, and recipients of state-targeted social assistance. The amount of loans to be written off had to be no more than 3 million tenge (around $6,500) as of 1 June 2019.

==== Education ====
At the teacher's conference held in August 2019, Tokayev announced that the average salary for schoolteachers in Kazakhstan would be doubled within four years. He also instructed the Ministry of Education and Science to develop and launch special programs to overcome the academic gap of children from low-income families and schools in socially troubled areas, noting the need of overcome educational inequality specially between rural and urban areas.

==== Energy and cryptocurrency ====
Tokayev expressed the need for Kazakhstan to have a nuclear power plant in April 2019, claiming that the country would face an electricity deficit by 2030. From early 2021, energy consumption in Kazakhstan sharply rose by 8% as a result of increase in cryptocurrency mining from miners fleeing China.

In May 2021, Tokayev announced the Low-Carbon Development Concept, a national project which seeks to reduce Kazakhstan's dependency on coal by development electric power industry and the country's energy balance by 2035.

==== Environment ====
From the outset of his presidency, Tokayev signaled a commitment to addressing environmental challenges, describing them as "concerning" in his inaugural speech. To streamline environmental governance, he established the Ministry of Ecology, Geology, and Natural Resources in June 2019, appointing Magzum Myrzagaliev as its head. The Ministry was tasked with overseeing environmental protection, resource management, and waste treatment, reflecting Tokayev's broader agenda of sustainable development.

One of the key environmental issues Tokayev addressed was air pollution in Almaty, where he emphasized the need for decisive action. He directed the government, the city administration, and Samruk-Energy to expedite the transition of the Almaty-2 thermal power station to natural gas, citing its emissions as a major source of pollution. Tokayev warned against any delays in implementation, calling them "absolutely unacceptable."

His administration also pursued legislative measures to protect Kazakhstan's natural resources. In 2021, the Mäjilis ratified a protocol under the Caspian Sea Framework Convention, aimed at regulating pollution from land-based sources. Tokayev signed the law into effect on 4 October 2021, reinforcing Kazakhstan's commitment to regional environmental cooperation.

==== Healthcare ====
Tokayev supported a health insurance mandate in Kazakhstan as a way to improve the quality and accessibility of medical services as well as maintained funding for free medical care and the development of healthcare system.

On 7 July 2020, Tokayev signed the new code "On public health and healthcare system" and law "On amendments and additions to certain legislative acts on healthcare issues" into place, which strengthened legal protection for medical personnel, introduced a differentiated approach to medical errors, and redefined a citizen's rights regarding vaccination. The code also restricted the consumption of e-cigarettes and introduced a ban on the import, production and distribution of snus and other non-smoking tobacco products, as well as introduced administrative responsibility for the sale of tobacco products to persons under the age of 21.

==== Infrastructure ====
Tokayev pledged that the government would continue to invest in the development of infrastructure so that Kazakh citizens would have access to clean drinking water, natural gas, and public transport, and to monitor the implementation of the Nurly Zhol programme, which was enacted by Nazarbayev. He called on officials, along with the Parliament and the Accounts Committee, to ensure the efficient use of budget funds.

During a visit to Almaty in May 2020, Tokayev was presented with plans for the reconstruction of Almaty International Airport, which included a new terminal. He subsequently expressed his desire for Almaty Airport to become the largest aviation hub in Central Asia.

==== Political reforms ====
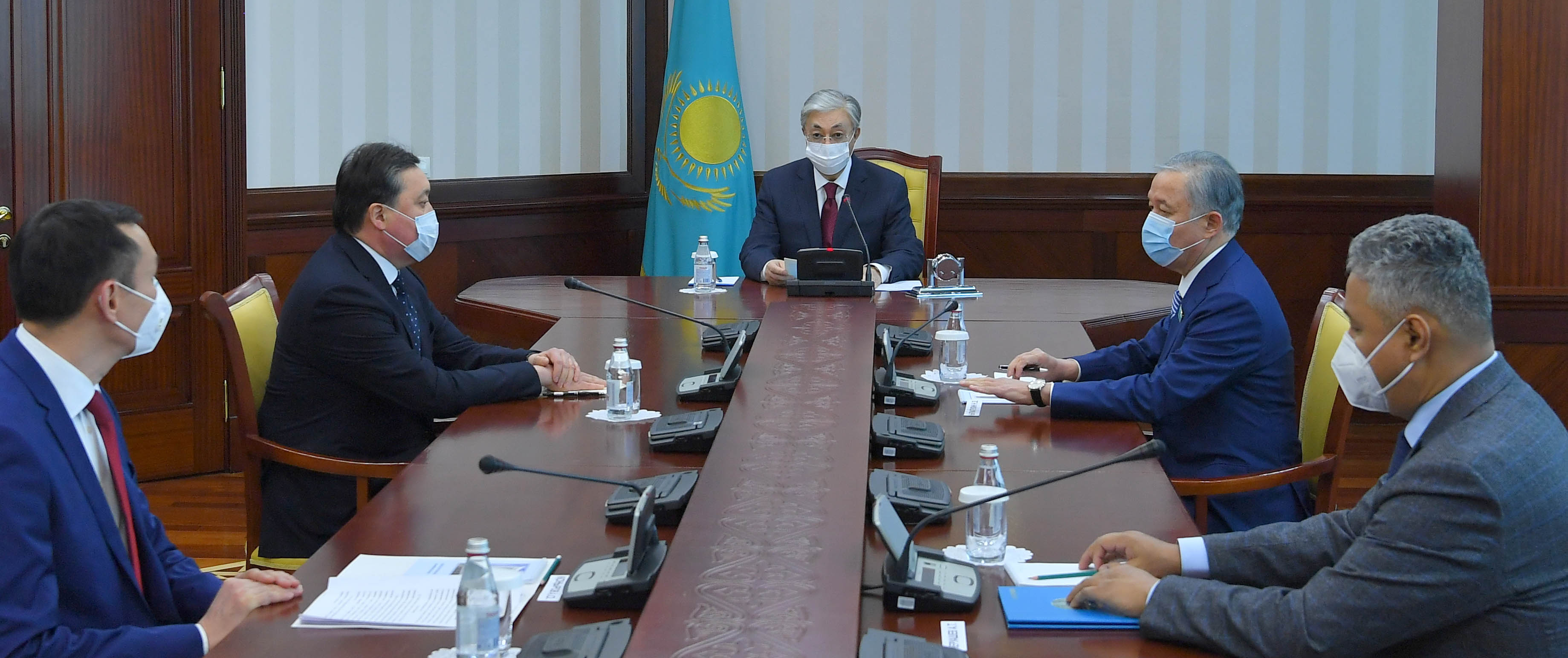
Tokayev meeting with government officials and deputies, 15 January 2021

One of the significant elements of the President's public policy was to propose the concept of a "Listening State", where the public administration would follow the basic principle of "not a citizen for the state, but a state for the citizen". Tokayev advocated political reforms that would promote the concept of a "state that listens" to civil society, creating a constructive dialogue. Tokayev initiated the establishment of the new National Council of Public Trust to facilitate this dialogue.

He also called for direct elections for the äkıms (local heads) of rural districts, townships, and villages to be held in 2021 to which he signed decree on 14 September 2020 of the implementation of National Plan of Measures which set tasks for the drafting of constitutional amendments that would allow for rural äkım direct elections as well as the development of local government and its functions.

In May 2020, Tokayev signed into law several reforms, which included "On the procedure for organizing and holding peaceful assemblies in the Republic of Kazakhstan", which updated policies regulating protests but was critiqued by human rights activists. In his State of the Nation Address, he emphasised that "Kazakhstan must create a multi-party system to build a modern, effective state", also saying that the ruling Nur Otan party should collaborate more with other parties.

In January 2021, Tokayev, at the opening of the first session of the 7th Parliament proposed to reduce the electoral threshold from 7% to 5%, stating it would encourage more registered parties to participate in the future parliamentary elections, as well as the vote option "Against all" to be re-included in the ballots once again. As the Parliament ratified Tokayev's proposed constitutional amendments, he signed the laws into place on 25 May 2021.

==== Foreign policy ====
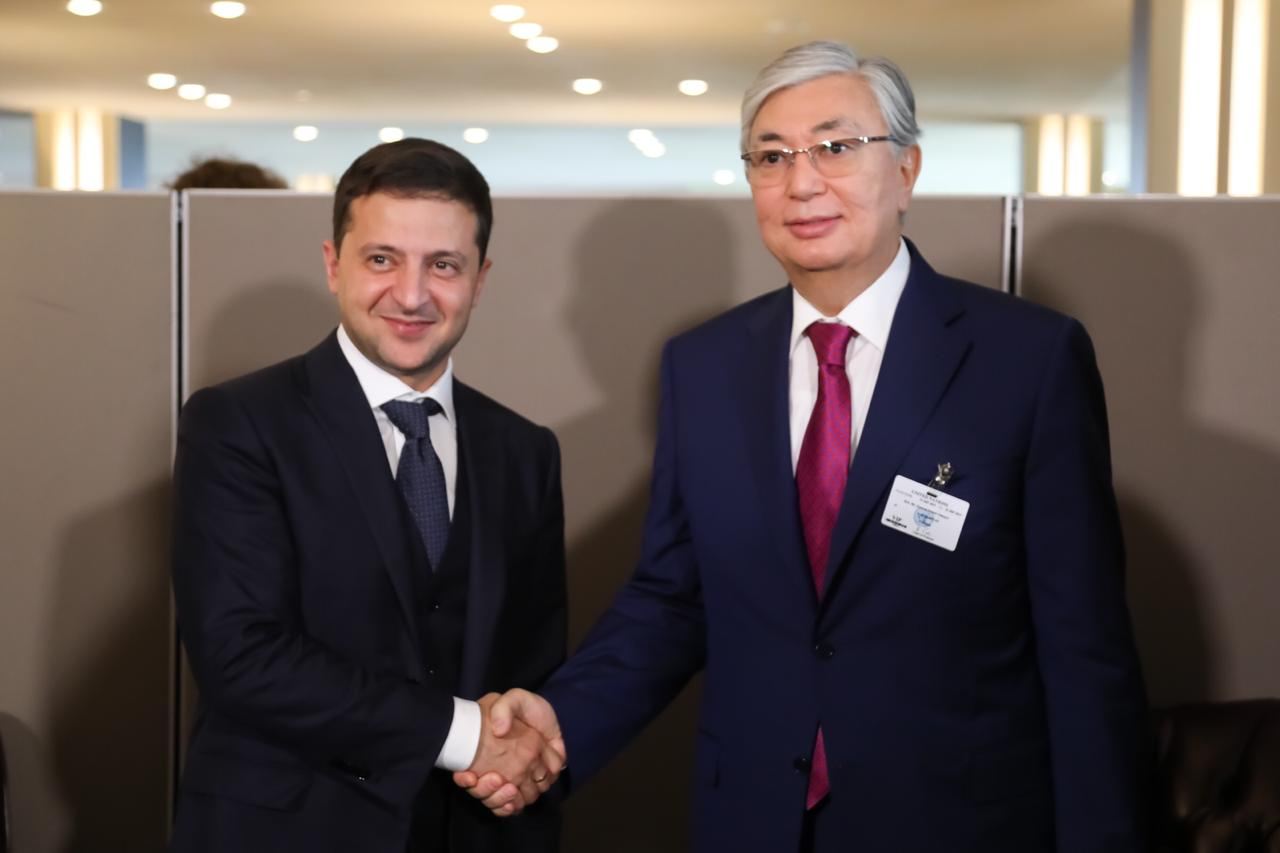
Tokayev (right) with Ukrainian President Volodymyr Zelenskyy at the United Nations General Assembly in New York City, 25 September 2019

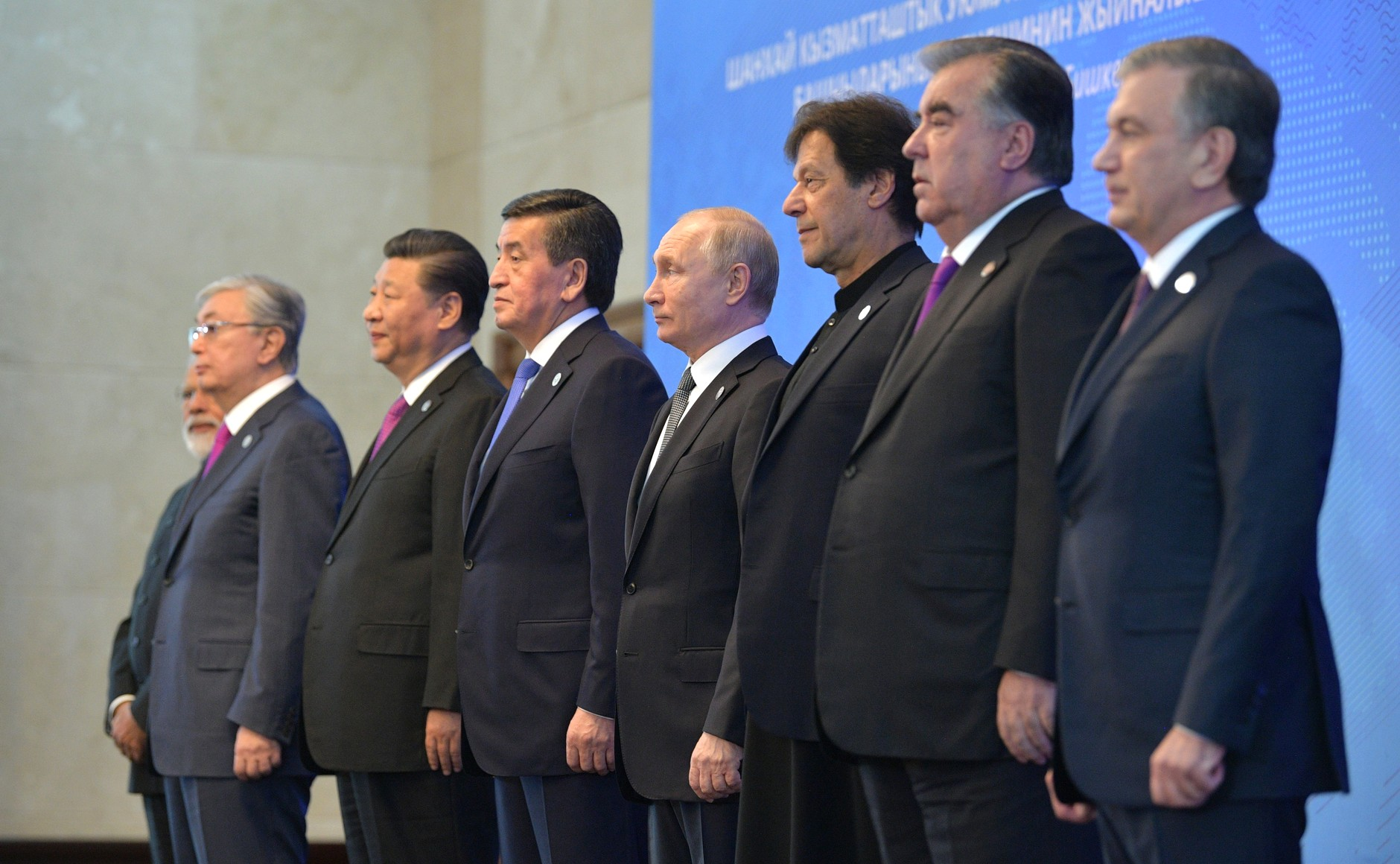
Tokayev at the 2019 Shanghai Cooperation Organisation summit

In his first month as president, Tokayev met with four world leaders — Russian President Vladimir Putin and Chinese leader Xi Jinping during trips abroad, and South Korean President Moon Jae-in and Uzbek President Shavkat Mirziyoyev in Nur-Sultan.

On 4 December 2019, before a state visit to Germany, he gave an interview to Deutsche Welle, in which he called Germany a "key European partner for Kazakhstan". In that same interview, he drew controversy by saying that he did not believe that the annexation of Crimea by the Russian Federation was an invasion while also saying that he believed in the "wisdom of the Russian leadership", drawing condemnation from the Ukrainian Ministry of Foreign Affairs, who issued a demarche in response.

In April 2021, Tokayev signed a decree forming the Special Representative for International Cooperation, claiming that such post would increase the attention of Kazakhstan's leadership to international cooperation concerns in the light of the dynamically changing global and regional agenda. He appointed Erzhan Kazykhanov to the post, whom was instructed to deal with issues of expanding international cooperation in the humanitarian sphere, climate diplomacy, as well as promoting Kazakhstan's key foreign policy initiatives.

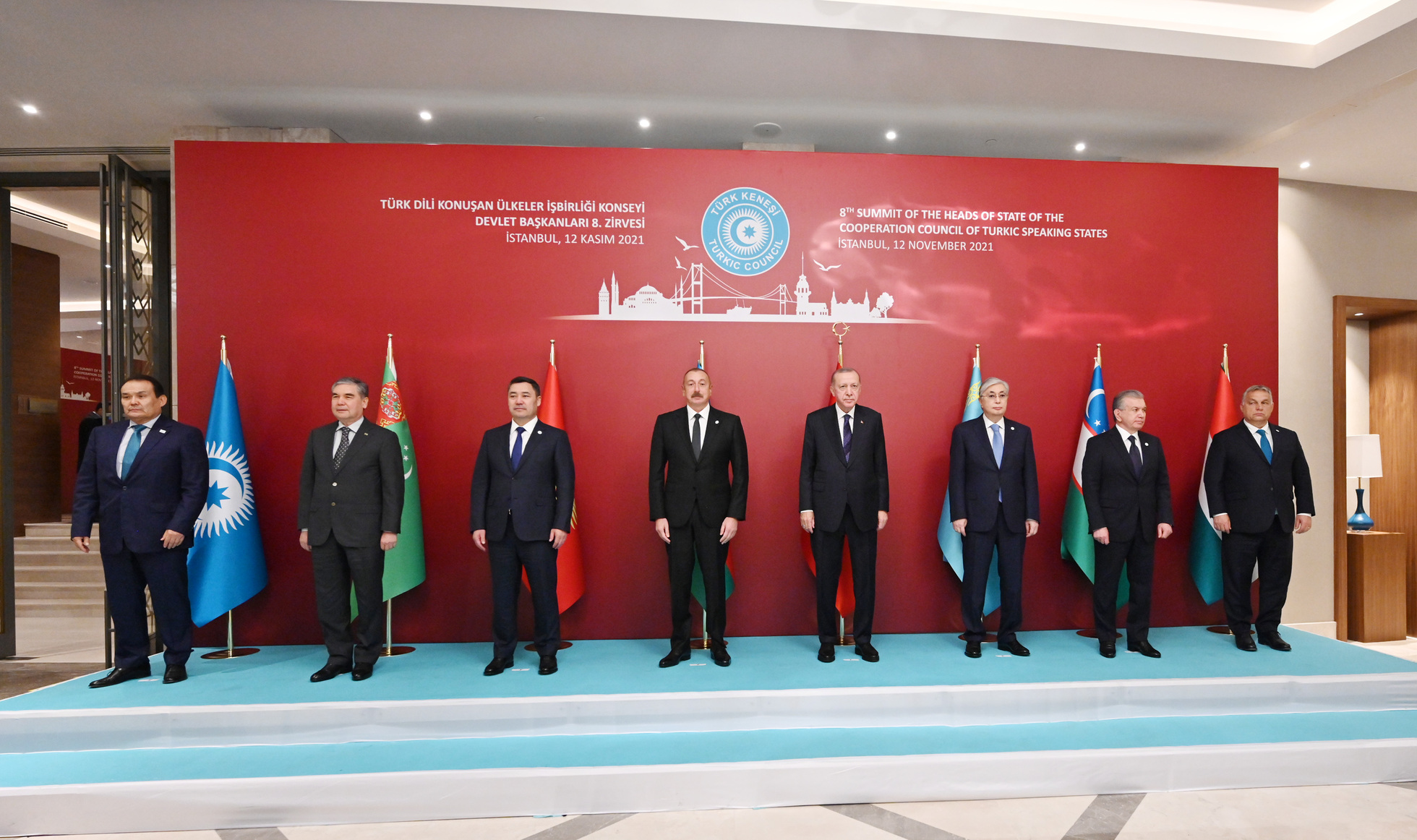
Tokayev at the 2021 Cooperation Council of Turkic-Speaking States in Istanbul, Turkey

During the sixth meeting of the Conference on Interaction and Confidence-Building Measures in Asia held on 10–11 October 2021, Tokayev proposed turning the intergovernmental forum into a full-fledged organisation, outlining that the transformation would emphasise Asia's new role in global affairs which in turn give the member states commitment to create "a truly common, indivisible, and comprehensive security architecture on the largest continent".

==== 2021 Taliban offensive ====
Following the 2021 Taliban offensive, Tokayev urged to take measures in ensuring safety of Kazakh citizens and diplomats within Afghanistan, in which Kazakhstan would closely follow its developments. During a meeting with the EU Special Representative for Central Asia Tehri Hakala, Tokayev expressed concern in regards to the stability in Afghanistan, warning that entire region of Central Asian is facing a risk due to the conflict. On 18 August 2021, he instructed the Ministry of Foreign Affairs to attempt to provide a maximum assistance in returning ethnic Kazakhs residing in Afghanistan, while noting that the issue of accepting Afghan refugees would not be considered.

==== Russia ====
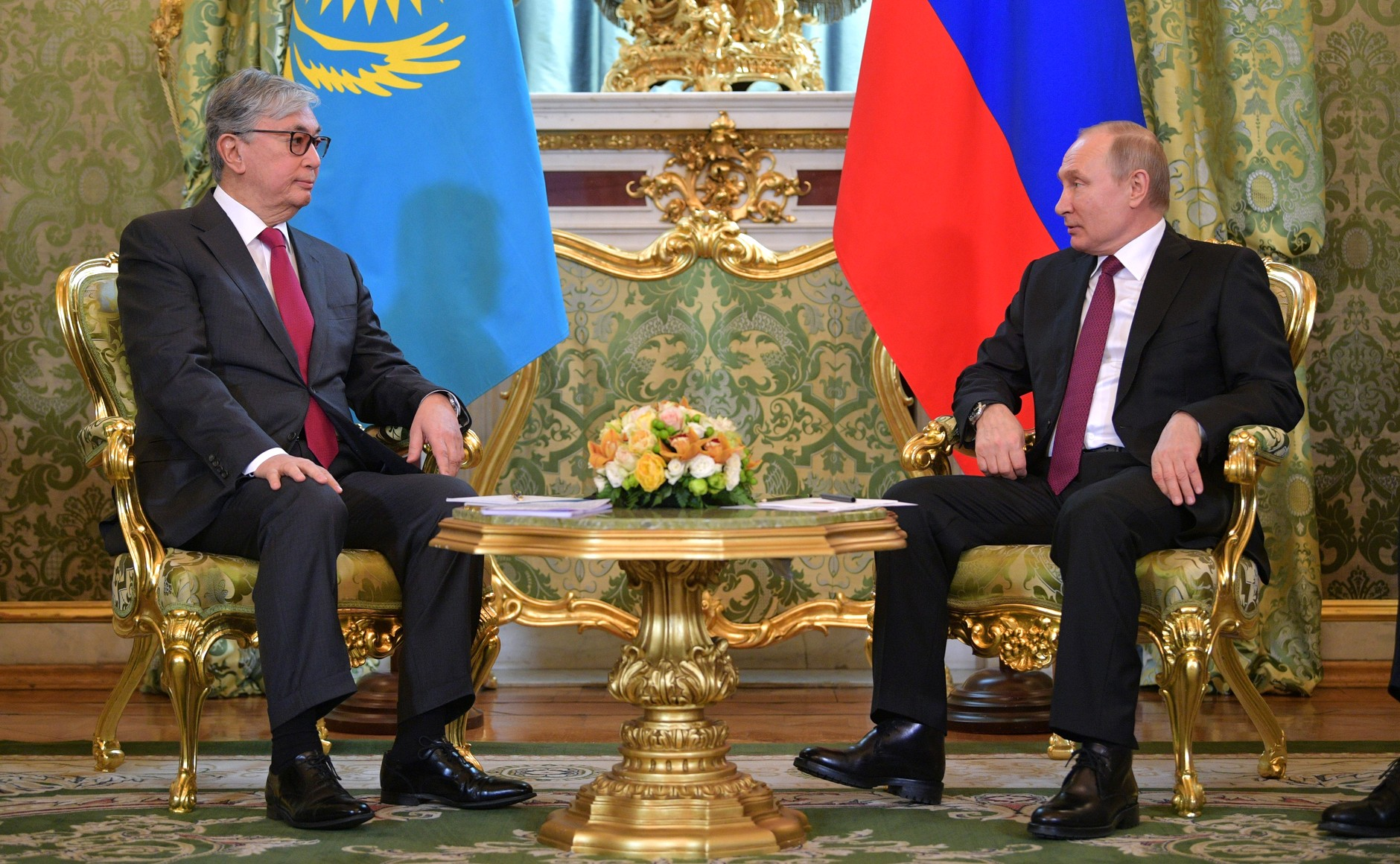
Tokayev and Putin in the Kremlin, 4 April 2019

According to political analyst Rico Isaacs, the decision in Tokayev replacing Nursultan Nazarbayev was due to his own full will to not rapidly implement democratic reforms, which would hurt Nazarbayev's legacy of stability and relations with Russia. Just two weeks after taking office, Tokayev visited Moscow in his first foreign state visit on 4 April 2019, meeting with Putin alongside other Russian officials. During the visit, Putin offered Russian assistance to Tokayev in the construction of a proposed nuclear power plant in the country. In June 2019, Tokayev stated that the decision of constructing a nuclear power plants would be made on decision by local matter, if by means of a referendum.

In late 2020, Russian lawmakers Vyacheslav Nikonov and Yevgeny Fyodorov made remarks on how all of Kazakhstan's territory was a gift given by the Soviet Union. This sparked backlash from the Kazakh Ministry of Foreign Affairs which warned about severing relations between both nations due to "provocative attacks". In response to controversial statements, Tokayev in response on Egemen Qazaqstan, wrote that such words from "some foreign citizens" are aimed at "spoiling" relations between two states, insisting that "nobody from outside gave Kazakhs this large territory as a gift."

==== China ====
Tokayev made a state visit to China in September 2019. There, he met with CCP General Secretary Xi Jinping in Beijing of which both leaders agreed to form a permanent comprehensive strategic partnership. Tokayev vowed to triple wheat exports to China to 2 million tonnes possibly including salt, dairy products, meat and poultry as well. During a visit to Peking University, he met with his long-term intern language teacher Liu Shiqing as well as Kazakh students. Shiqing described Tokayev as "sociable, active, quick", who became fluent in Chinese and as "one of the best students."

==== Former Soviet republics ====
On 14 April 2019, Tokayev visited neighboring Uzbekistan for talks with President Shavkat Mirziyoyev. On 16–17 May, Tokayev hosted foreign leaders such as Armen Sarkissian and Mamuka Bakhtadze in the capital for the 12th annual Astana Economic Forum, the first to be hosted by its pioneer, President Nazarbayev. He also hosted the regional leaders of Russia, Kyrgyzstan, Belarus, Tajikistan, Armenia and Moldova for the Eurasian Economic Union and Supreme Eurasian Economic Council summit on 29 May.

During a visit to Kyrgyzstan in late 2019, he visited the House-Museum of Kyrgyz writer Chingiz Aitmatov in Bishkek, where he met with the late writer's wife and reminisced about his first encounters with Aitmatov in Beijing in 1989.

Following the breakout of the 2020 Nagorno-Karabakh war, Tokayev called on Armenia to withdraw from the disputed territory, citing the United Nations Security Council accordance to which he claimed that the Armenian government failed to fulfill for its past 30 years.

==== United States ====
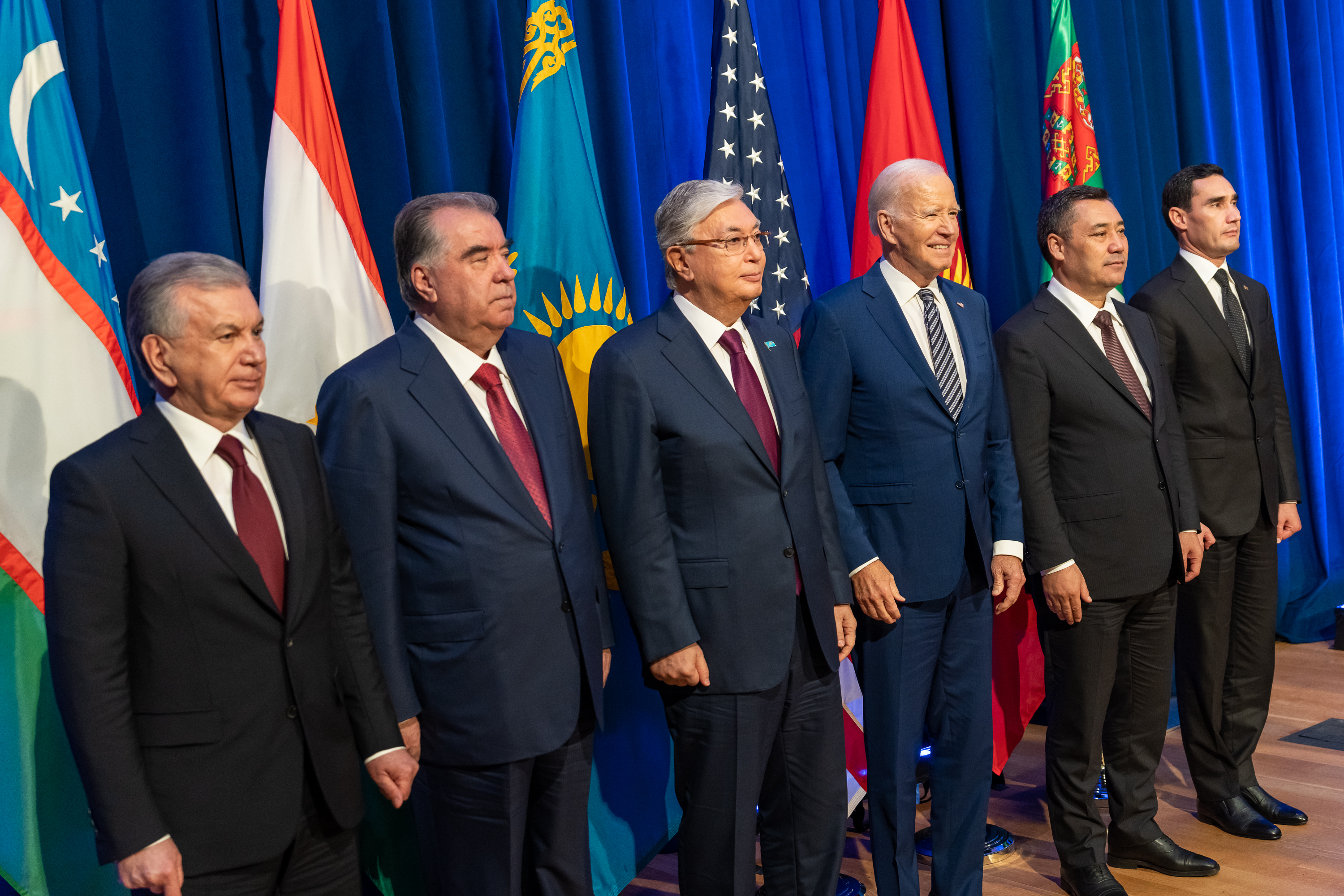
Tokayev and US President Joe Biden with Central Asian leaders at the C5+1 Summit in New York City, 19 September 2023

After becoming president, Tokayev maintained strong relations with Kazakhstan's strategic allies, including the United States. On 2 February 2020, he met with U.S. Secretary of State Mike Pompeo during his visit to Astana, where both sides expressed the importance of deepening bilateral ties across the entire spectrum of cooperation, including trade, investment, IT technologies, promoting democratic values and combating international terrorism. Pompeo wished for Tokayev in his success in implementing political reforms with an open skies agreement being signed which created a legal basis for launching direct regular flights between Kazakhstan and U.S. According to some analysts, Pompeo's visit to Kazakhstan was seen as an attempt to counter China's influence within the country as he had met with ethnic Kazakh families of whom were victims of the Xinjiang re-education camps and urged for Tokayev to pressure China over its persecution of ethnic Uyghur and Kazakhs.

In June 2020, U.S. President Donald Trump congratulated President Tokayev on the first anniversary of his presidency. In his congratulatory letter, Trump expressed his support for the reforms that had been undertaken in Kazakhstan and reaffirmed his intention to further develop a strategic partnership between the two countries.

=== 2022 unrest and consolidation of power ===
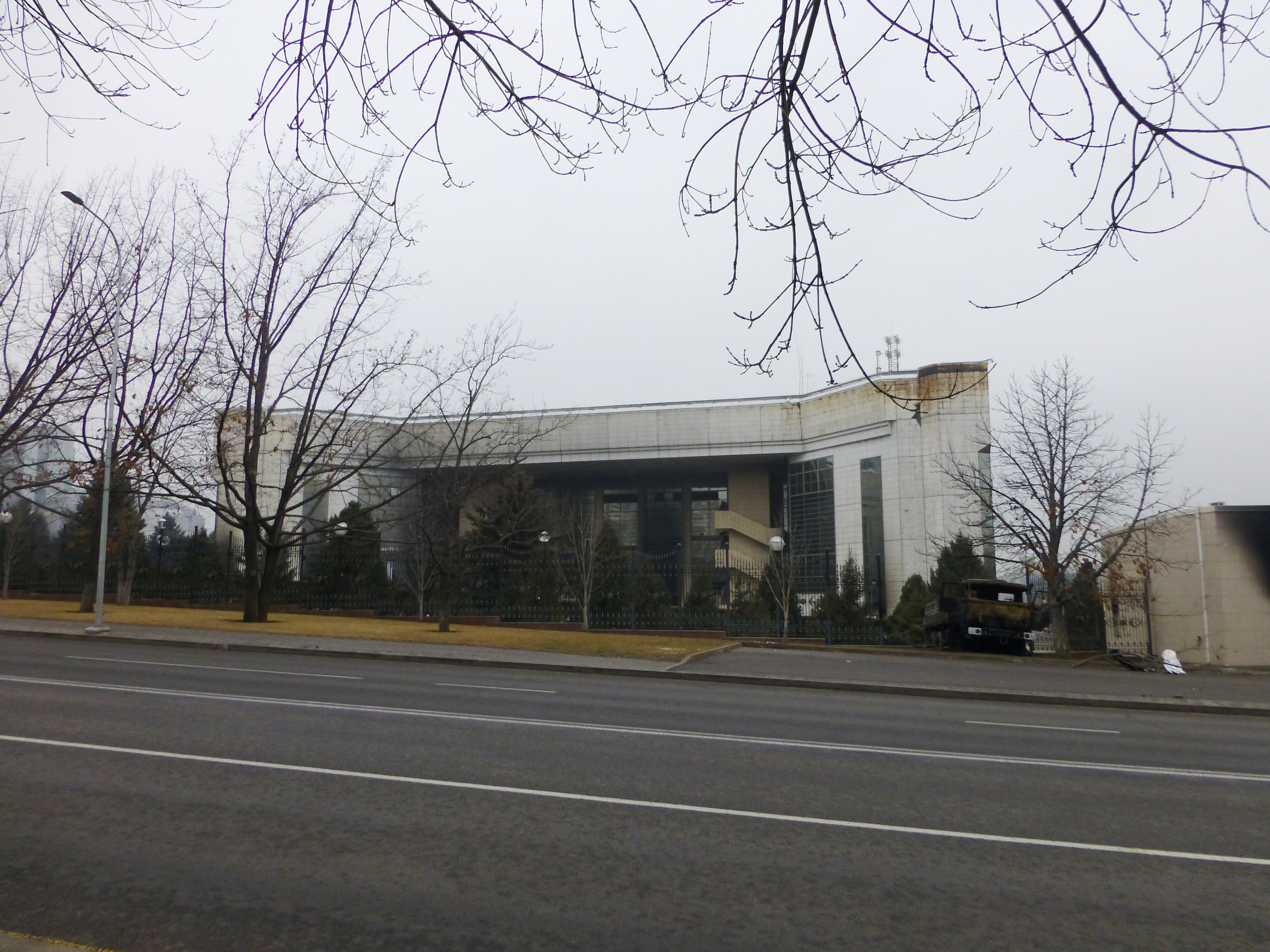
President's Residence after being stormed by protesters during the unrest in Almaty,

In January 2022, protests erupted in Zhanaozen, Mangystau Region, following a sudden increase in liquefied petroleum gas (LPG) prices. In response to the sharp rise, Tokayev introduced price controls on LPG, diesel, gasoline, and essential goods in an effort to stabilize the situation and address public concerns. However, the protests quickly escalated into large-scale nationwide civil unrest, driven by grievances over economic inequality, corruption, and political stagnation under Tokayev's administration and the long rule of former president Nursultan Nazarbayev.

On 5 January 2022, Tokayev declared a state of emergency, imposed a curfew, and authorized security forces to use deadly force against demonstrators, stating they would "shoot to kill, without warning." He labeled the protesters as "bandits and terrorists" and accused them of attempting to destabilize the country as part of an alleged coup d'état attempt orchestrated by "foreign-trained militants". That same day, he dismissed Prime Minister Asqar Mamin and assumed control of the Security Council, removing Nazarbayev from his long-held position as chairman. He also replaced National Security Committee (NSC) chairman Karim Massimov with Ermek Sagimbayev. To restore order, Tokayev requested military assistance from the Russian-led Collective Security Treaty Organization (CSTO), marking the first deployment of CSTO forces in a member state as part of a peacekeeping operation. Later, Massimov was arrested on charges of high treason.

The aftermath of the unrest resulted in significant mass detentions, civilian casualties and property damage, prompting Tokayev in an address given to the Parliament on 11 January 2022 to initiate sweeping political and economic reforms, which included a focus on economic justice, political decentralization, anti-corruption measures, and enhanced security. As part of this shift in policy, several of Nazarbayev's close relatives lost key positions. On 15 January, the sovereign wealth fund Samruk-Kazyna announced the resignations of Qairat Sharipbaev as CEO of QazaqGaz and Dimash Dosanov as head of KazTransOil, both sons-in-law of Nazarbayev. On 17 January, Timur Kulibayev, Nazarbayev's son-in-law and one of Kazakhstan's wealthiest individuals, resigned as chairman of the Atameken National Chamber of Entrepreneurs. That same day, Tokayev dismissed Nazarbayev's nephew, Samat Abish, from his role as deputy chairman of the NSC. This marked a move in Tokayev's consolidation of power and his shift toward greater political independence from Nazarbayev's influence, setting the stage for a reshaped political hierarchy in Kazakhstan.

==== First Smaiylov government ====
Amidst the 2022 unrest, Tokayev dismissed the government of Asqar Mamin and appointed Älihan Smaiylov as acting prime minister on 5 January 2022. Smaiylov, a technocrat who had previously served as First Deputy Prime Minister and Minister of Finance under Mamin, was confirmed as prime minister on 11 January 2022 following unanimous parliamentary approval by the Mäjilis.

Tokayev endorsed his nomination, citing Smaiylov's economic expertise and governance experience as essential for ensuring stability and implementing reforms in the aftermath of the unrest. Smaiylov's appointment during a period of post-turmoil marked a political transition, with his cabinet comprising a mix of established officials and new ministers, maintaining continuity while implementing Tokayev's reform agenda. The reliance on existing bureaucratic structures largely suggested that systemic changes under Tokayev would be gradual.

==== Amanat chairmanship ====
On 28 January 2022, at the 21st Nur Otan Extraordinary Congress, Tokayev was unanimously elected as the chairman of the Nur Otan party, succeeding Nursultan Nazarbayev, who had held the position since 1999. In his speech, Tokayev outlined his priorities, including strengthening societal unity, addressing socio-economic issues, fighting corruption, and improving public reception. He also suggested that he might step down from the party by the end of 2022 to maintain presidential impartiality.

During Tokayev's tenure, several key changes occurred within the Nur Otan party ranks. Nurlan Nigmatulin, a prominent Nur Otan deputy, resigned as chairman of the Mäjilis, and Erlan Qoşanov, Tokayev's former chief of staff, took over the position. Additionally, Dariga Nazarbayeva, a key figure in the party and Nazarbayev's daughter, resigned her seat.

At the 22nd Nur Otan Extraordinary Congress on 1 March 2022, Tokayev supported a proposal to rename the party to Amanat. He emphasized decentralizing the party, improving voter engagement, and addressing real issues. During the congress, Nigmatullin was removed from the Amanat political council.

On 26 April 2022, at the 23rd Amanat Extraordinary Congress, Tokayev resigned as party chairman and withdrew from Amanat membership to maintain presidential neutrality and separation of powers. The delegates unanimously approved Tokayev's proposal to have Erlan Qoşanov take over as party chairman.

==== Constitutional ====
On 16 March 2022, Tokayev proposed package of constitutional reforms to reduce presidential powers and strengthen parliament, transitioning from a "superpresidential" system to a "presidential republic with a strong parliament". The reforms amended 33 out of 99 articles — one-third of the Kazakh Constitution — introducing measures such as barring the president from party membership, prohibiting relatives from holding top government positions, and limiting presidential control over appointing regional governors (akims) by requiring regional assemblies (maslihats) to approve akim nominees. Other key changes included reducing presidentially appointed seats in the Senate, introducing a mixed electoral system, restoring the Constitutional Court, and removing Nursultan Nazarbayev's constitutional title of "Elbasy" (Leader of the Nation).

A referendum on 5 June 2022 approved these amendments with a majority of voters. The constitutional amendments were later signed into law by Tokayev on 5 November 2022.

In September 2022, Tokayev introduced a nonrenewable seven-year presidential term and renamed the capital back to Astana from Nur-Sultan.

===== Administrative-territorial =====
On 4 May 2022, Tokayev signed a decree creating three new regions — Ulytau, Jetisu, and Abai Region — and moving the administrative center of Almaty Region to the city of Qonayev as part of administrative reforms aimed at improving public administration and regional development. As a result, Kazakhstan consisted of 17 regions and three cities of national significance, totaling 20 territorial units.

===== Institutional =====
Tokayev signed a decree on 14 June 2022 establishing the National Kurultai, a new civic institution designed to have broader and more relevant functions than its predecessor, the National Council of Public Trust. The first meeting of the National Kurultai took place on 16 June in Ulytau Region.

==== 2022 snap presidential election ====
On 1 September 2022, during his State of the Nation Address, Tokayev announced snap presidential elections, citing the need for a new mandate of trust from the people and officially declared his re-election bid. He later signed a decree on 21 September, officially scheduling the election for 20 November. Tokayev promised that the election would be a major reset of Kazakhstan's political system and assured it would be fair and transparent, with both domestic and international observers taking part.

In his bid for presidency an independent, Tokayev expressed his interest in being nominated by "a broad coalition of socio-political forces". On 6 October 2022, a People's Coalition (HK) consisting of the parliamentary parties of Amanat, Aq Jol, and People's, as well as several public associations was formed in support of Tokayev's candidacy. During the forum, the HK nominated Tokayev as their presidential candidate, stating that the election would shape Kazakhstan's future. Tokayev's campaign programme, Fair State – Fair Economy – Fair Society (Kazakh: Әділетті мемлекет – Әділетті экономика – Әділетті қоғам), focused on political reforms, economic development, and social investments to build a Fair Kazakhstan.

On 20 November 2022, Tokayev was re-elected as president in an electoral landslide, winning 81.3% of the vote in the first round, with little serious opposition. The presidential election featured an "against all" option, which received 6% of the vote share, and most of Tokayev's challengers were viewed as "pocket candidates" with low recognition and limited support. While the Organization for Security and Co-operation in Europe praised the election's preparation, it criticized the lack of real competition and called for legal reforms to ensure greater political pluralism.

=== Presidency since 2022 ===
Tokayev was inaugurated at the Palace of Independence in Astana on 26 November 2022. In his inaugural address, Tokayev reaffirmed his commitment to implementing comprehensive political reforms aimed at establishing a Fair Kazakhstan, grounded in the principles of democracy, rule of law, and respect for human rights.

Following the inauguration, Tokayev signed a series of significant decrees, including the appointment of the Senate election date for 14 January 2023, the initiation of a state program for rural development covering the period 2023–2027, measures for the return of illegally exported national assets, and reforms of the Supreme Audit Chamber to enhance governmental transparency and accountability. Tokayev also approved an action plan for the implementation of his 2022 electoral program to ensure the continuation and consolidation of constitutional and institutional reforms throughout his term of office.

On 15 February 2023, Tokayev signed a law officially repealing the "Law on the First President of the Republic of Kazakhstan – Elbasy", formally ending Nursultan Nazarbayev's constitutional title as Leader of the Nation. The law also removed special privileges for him and his family, including lifetime immunity from prosecution. This action followed a ruling by the newly re-established Constitutional Court, which found the law inconsistent with constitutional amendments approved by the nation.

On 2 September 2024, Tokayev delivered his annual State of the Nation Address, outlining priorities for Kazakhstan's economic, political, and social future. The speech emphasized critical areas such as addressing the budget deficit, strengthening governance, and improving living standards.

==== 2023 snap legislative election ====
On 19 January 2023, Tokayev signed a decree dissolving the 7th Parliament of Kazakhstan and announced early legislative elections for the lower house Mäjilis on 19 March 2023. This move was part of his broader political modernization agenda following constitutional reforms initiated in 2022. In a public statement, Tokayev expressed hope that the new composition of deputies would contribute to the comprehensive modernization of Kazakhstan, emphasizing the importance of transparency and fairness in the electoral process.

The 2023 legislative elections used a mixed electoral system for the first time since 2004, with 70% of seats from party lists and 30% from single-member districts, reflecting recent constitutional reforms. The ruling Amanat party retained a majority control of Mäjilis amid participation from six parties and independent candidates. Despite increased pluralism, pro-government factions remained dominant, and some electoral irregularities were reported. Overall, the elections demonstrated Tokayev's approach of controlled political modernization while maintaining presidential influence.

==== Bektenov government ====
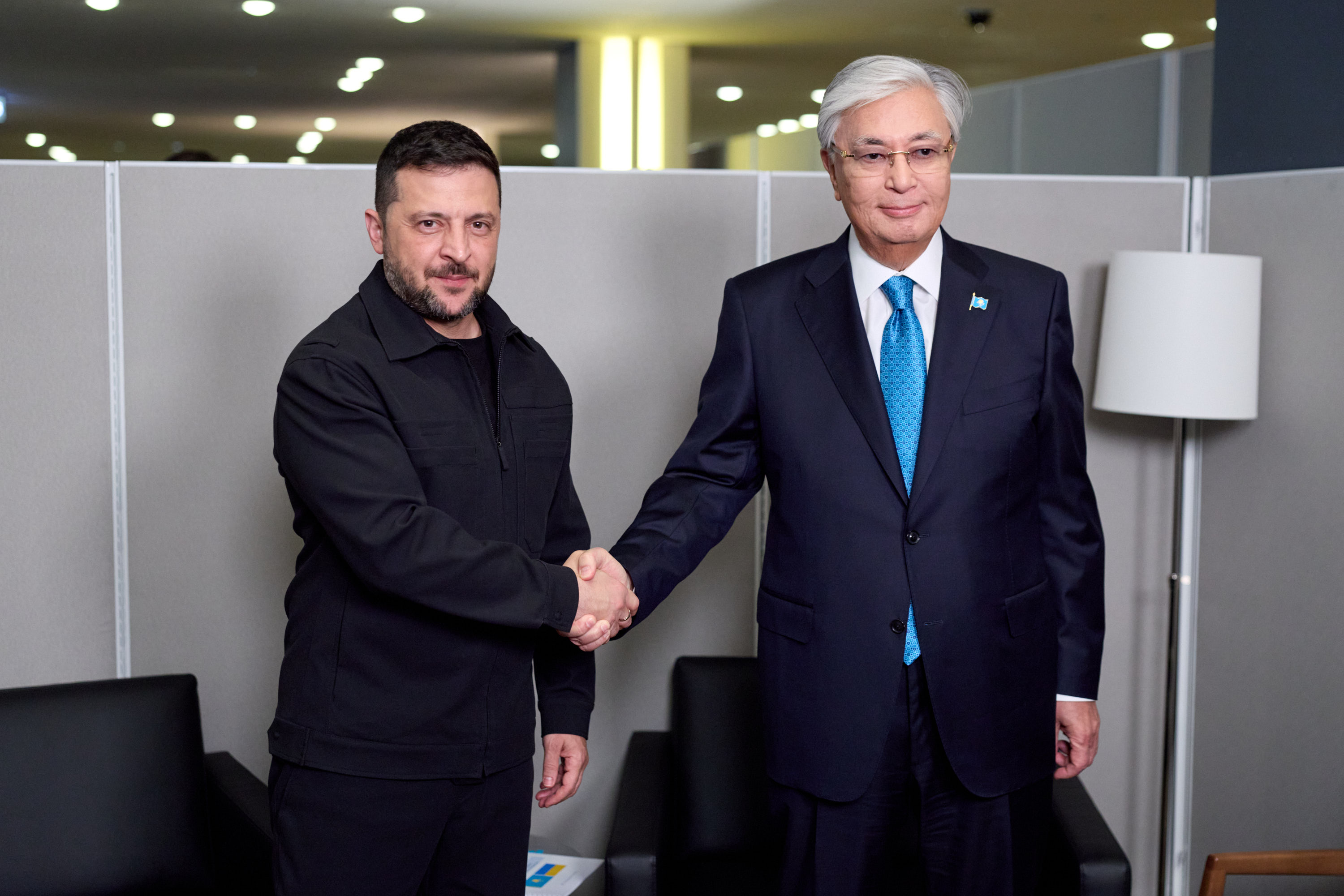
Tokayev with Ukrainian President Volodymyr Zelenskyy during the United Nations General Assembly in September 2025

==== 2025–2026 constitutional reforms ====
In his State of the Nation Address on 8 September 2025, Tokayev proposed a major constitutional reform to transition the Parliament of Kazakhstan from a bicameral to a unicameral system. He argued that the Senate, which he chaired for a decade, had fulfilled its historic mission but was no longer necessary for the country's next stage of development. Tokayev emphasized that the reform would eliminate the presidential quota for appointing deputies, aiming to create a "truly professional parliament" elected entirely through party lists. He stated that the proposal would be subject to extensive public discussion for at least one year, with a nationwide constitutional referendum tentatively scheduled for 2027.

Alongside these political reforms, Tokayev pursued digital modernization, opening the "Digital Bridge 2025" forum in October. He announced the creation of the "Alem.ai" International Center for Artificial Intelligence and set a goal to transform Kazakhstan into a "fully digital state" within three years.

Internationally, Tokayev sought to position Kazakhstan as a key transit hub rather than just a raw material exporter. Addressing the UN General Assembly in September 2025, he pledged to build 5,000 kilometers of railway by 2029 to strengthen the Trans-Caspian International Transport Route ("Middle Corridor"), supported by a locomotive supply deal with Wabtec. His administration also oversaw a surge in outbound capital; between January and October 2025, Kazakhstan became the second-largest source of foreign direct investment (FDI) into Turkey ($1.1 billion), trailing only the Netherlands.

=== Domestic policy ===
Tokayev's domestic policy, emphasized economic modernization, anti-corruption measures, and strengthening governance, with a focus on national security and decentralization. He highlights reducing inequality, promoting political accountability, fair wealth distribution, and creating job opportunities for youth, alongside reforms in education and technological innovation to foster a more inclusive society, national unity, and social stability.

==== Economic policy ====
Tokayev has placed strong emphasis on reducing Kazakhstan's reliance on raw materials by promoting the development of a diversified industrial base. In his State of the Nation Address in September 2023, he called for the accelerated growth of manufacturing clusters, including metals, heavy machinery, uranium processing, automotive parts, and fertilizers, with three-year tax exemptions offered to investors. He also set a target for processed agricultural products to represent 70 percent of total agricultural output within three years.

The government has aimed to attract up to US $150 billion in foreign investment and introduced banking reforms to encourage prudent business lending. In 2024, Kazakhstan attracted US $15.7 billion in foreign direct investment, marking the highest level in North and Central Asia. In 2025, the country reaffirmed its position as a reform-oriented investment destination, focusing on sectors such as mining, logistics, digital infrastructure, and sustainability.

Governance reforms have targeted demonopolization, the recovery of illegally privatized assets, and greater transparency. Major state-owned enterprises have begun privatization through public offerings. Support measures for small and medium enterprises, modernization of tax legislation, and reduction of state dominance in the economy have also been pursued.

Tokayev stressed macroeconomic stability and set a goal to double Kazakhstan's GDP by 2029. In July 2024, he approved the National Development Plan focusing on quality growth, innovation, and well-being. The plan aims to raise the national GDP to $450 billion, increase growth to 6.7%, and improve life expectancy to 77 years, positioning Kazakhstan as a high-income country.

==== Energy and infrastructure development ====
Tokayev has led major initiatives to modernize Kazakhstan's energy sector and infrastructure. In response to the 2022 energy crisis, Tokayev signed a decree launching a national energy efficiency program aimed at reducing energy waste, modernizing power plants, and improving grid resilience. In 2024, the Kazakh government under Tokayev's initiative launched a comprehensive national infrastructure plan valued at 40 trillion tenge, covering energy, transportation, water management, and digital technologies. This plan aims to strengthen Kazakhstan's position as a Eurasian transit hub, including expanded capacity on the Trans-Caspian Gas Pipeline. He approved a five-year National Project for the Modernization of the Energy and Utilities Sectors in December 2024 to upgrade infrastructure, enhance efficiency, and attract investment.

Tokayev actively supported the development of nuclear energy in Kazakhstan, championing the October 2024 nuclear power referendum which secured 71 percent voter approval to build the country's first nuclear power plant in the village of Ülken near Lake Balkhash. In March 2025, Tokayev established the Agency of the Republic of Kazakhstan for Atomic Energy, tasked with overseeing Kazakhstan's nuclear industry, uranium mining, and radiation safety. Later that year, Russia's Rosatom was selected as the lead consortium to construct the Ülken Nuclear Power Plant, with construction starting in August 2025 and expected completion by 2035–2036. Plans for second and third plant, to be built by China National Nuclear Corporation (CNNC) near Kurchatov or Aktau, are also underway.

Simultaneously, Tokayev's administration renegotiated production-sharing agreements with foreign oil firms to secure better terms, while regulatory reforms encourage private investment and strengthen partnerships in the energy sector.

==== Social and education policies ====
Tokayev has introduced a series of social and educational reforms aimed at improving public welfare, strengthening the national education system, and expanding legal protections. Notably, the government has implemented annual 20% salary increases for approximately 600,000 public-sector employees, including cultural, technical, and educational staff. In his September 2022 State of the Nation Address, Tokayev announced that starting in 2024, half of the National Fund's annual investment income would be allocated to a newly established National Fund for Children, with savings accounts accessible upon reaching adulthood. The initiative was formalized in November 2023, when he signed a law establishing the fund and setting its implementation framework.

Education policy under Tokayev's administration has focused on expanding internet connectivity and digital resources in schools, improving the overall education system, and modernizing vocational training to align with labour market requirements. In December 2024, Tokayev signed a decree declaring 2025 the "Year of Working Professions", emphasizing the strategic role of vocational and skilled trades in national development. In January 2025, the government launched the Keleshek voluntary education savings program, providing a one-time educational capital to children turning five years old to support future access to higher education.

In April 2024, Tokayev signed the Saltanat law, restoring criminal liability for domestic violence against women and children in response to public outcry over the high-profile case trial following the murder of Saltanat Nukenova. In June 2025, he signed a law banning face-covering Islamic garments, including niqabs and burqas, in public spaces, with exemptions for medical reasons or severe weather, framing it as a measure to promote national clothing and uphold Kazakhstan's secular identity.

=== Foreign policy ===
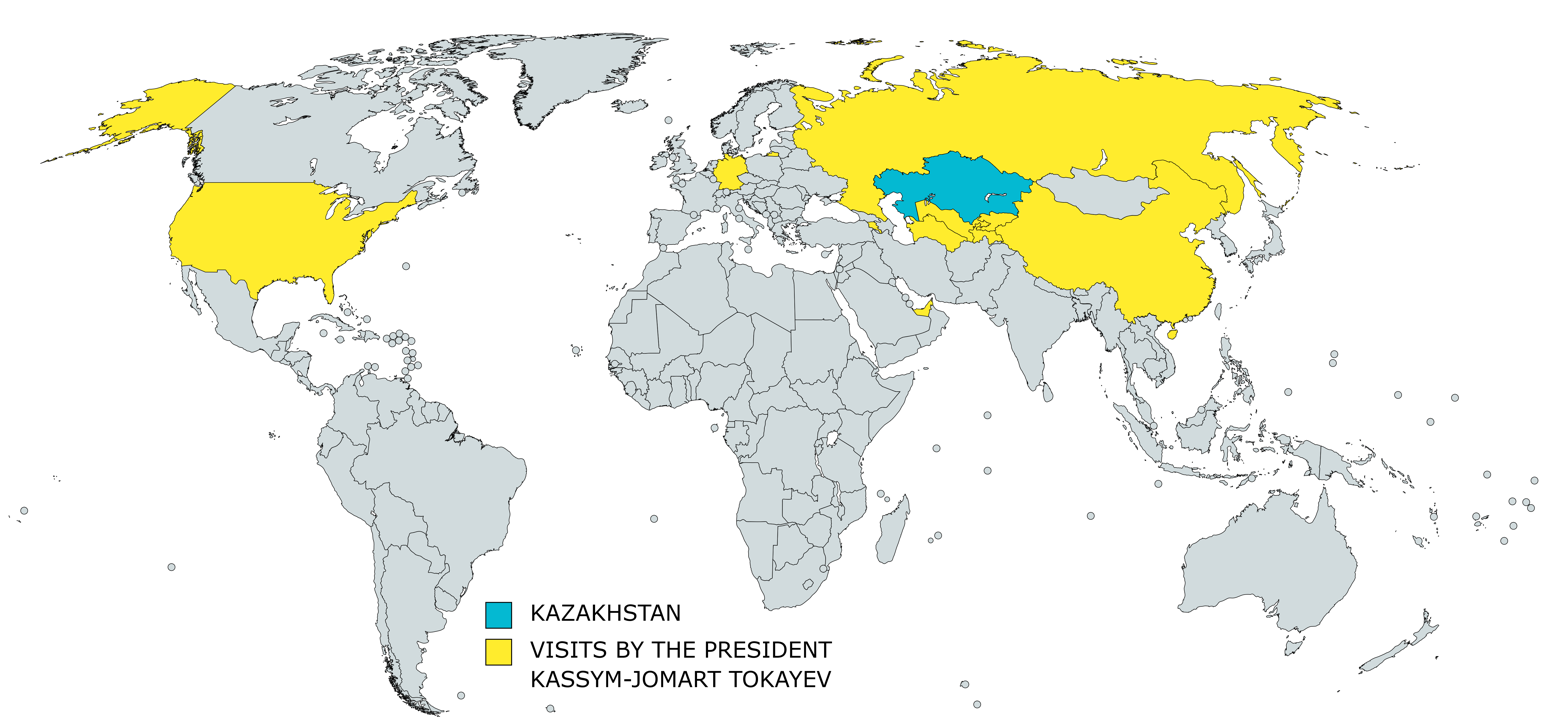
Map of the international presidential trips made by Tokayev

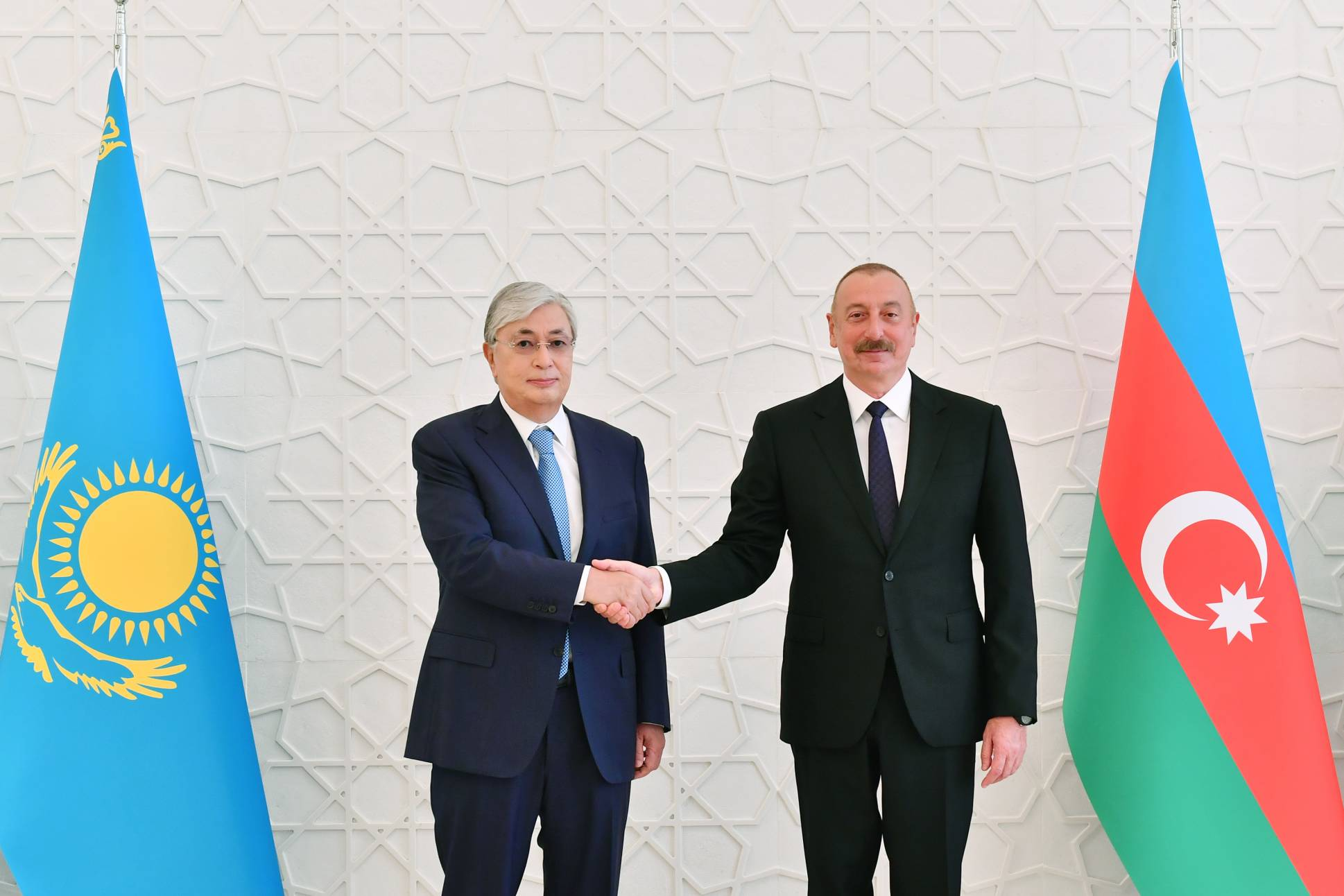
Tokayev with Azerbaijani President Ilham Aliyev on 24 August 2022

Tokayev has pledged to continue the foreign policy initiated by Nursultan Nazarbayev, maintaining Kazakhstan's multi-vector approach. This strategy balances relations with global powers, including allied relations with Russia, an eternal strategic partnership with China, and a strategic partnership with the United States, while prioritizing regional cooperation and expanding ties with Europe, the Middle East, and Asia. Tokayev emphasizes Kazakhstan's neutrality, sovereignty, and commitment to international law, actively participating in organizations like the United Nations, Eurasian Economic Union, and Shanghai Cooperation Organisation. Since 2022, he has reinforced Kazakhstan's independent foreign policy, focusing on economic diplomacy, security, and regional stability amidst global tensions.

During the October 2022 Council of Heads of State of the CIS summit in Astana, Tokayev proposed the creation of an International Organisation for the Russian Language (IORL) to strengthen cultural and humanitarian ties among CIS countries, using the Russian language to foster regional cooperation and intercultural dialogue. On 12 October 2023, Tokayev approved a draft treaty for the creation of the IORL, which was later ratified by the Parliament on 20 November 2024.

Tokayev has emphasized the need for a new global movement for peace, highlighting Kazakhstan's role in the Astana Process for Syria and the Congress of Leaders of World and Traditional Religions as key platforms for fostering inter-civilizational dialogue. Writing in The Jerusalem Post, he stressed the role of religious leaders in promoting global stability, healing conflicts, and countering extremism. Tokayev called for diplomacy to address global crises and warned against the risks of a new arms race, nuclear threats, and escalating geopolitical rivalries reminiscent of the Cold War.

Kazakhstan opted not to submit a formal application for BRICS membership in October 2024, citing the complex multi-stage process and uncertainties regarding the association's future development. Despite this, Kazakhstan accepted an invitation to become a BRICS partner state, effective 1 January 2025, allowing for closer cooperation without full membership. In an interview with Al Jazeera English, Tokayev stated that Kazakhstan chose to remain an observer and partner state in BRICS, citing the group's lack of permanent structures and uncertain long-term effectiveness as reasons for not pursuing full membership.

==== Russia ====
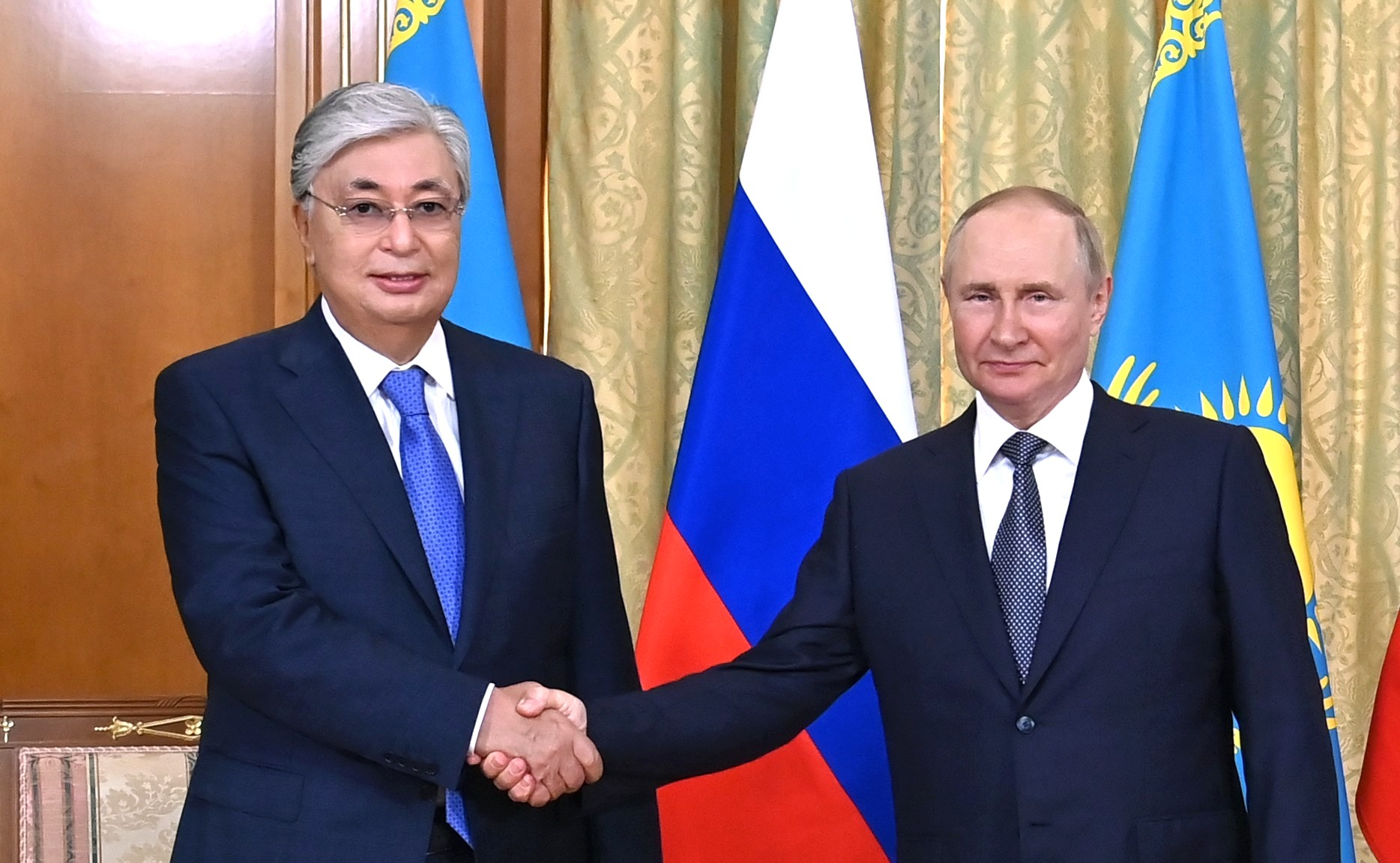
Tokayev and Russian President Vladimir Putin on 19 August 2022

After Russia invaded its neighboring Ukraine, Tokayev and Kazakh Foreign Minister Mukhtar Tleuberdi refused to recognize the Russian puppet states of Donetsk People's Republic and Luhansk People's Republic. He said that "we recognize neither Taiwan nor Kosovo, nor South Ossetia or Abkhazia. In all likelihood, this principle will be applied to quasi-state entities, which, in our opinion, are Luhansk and Donetsk." He refused to accept the Order of Alexander Nevsky from Putin.

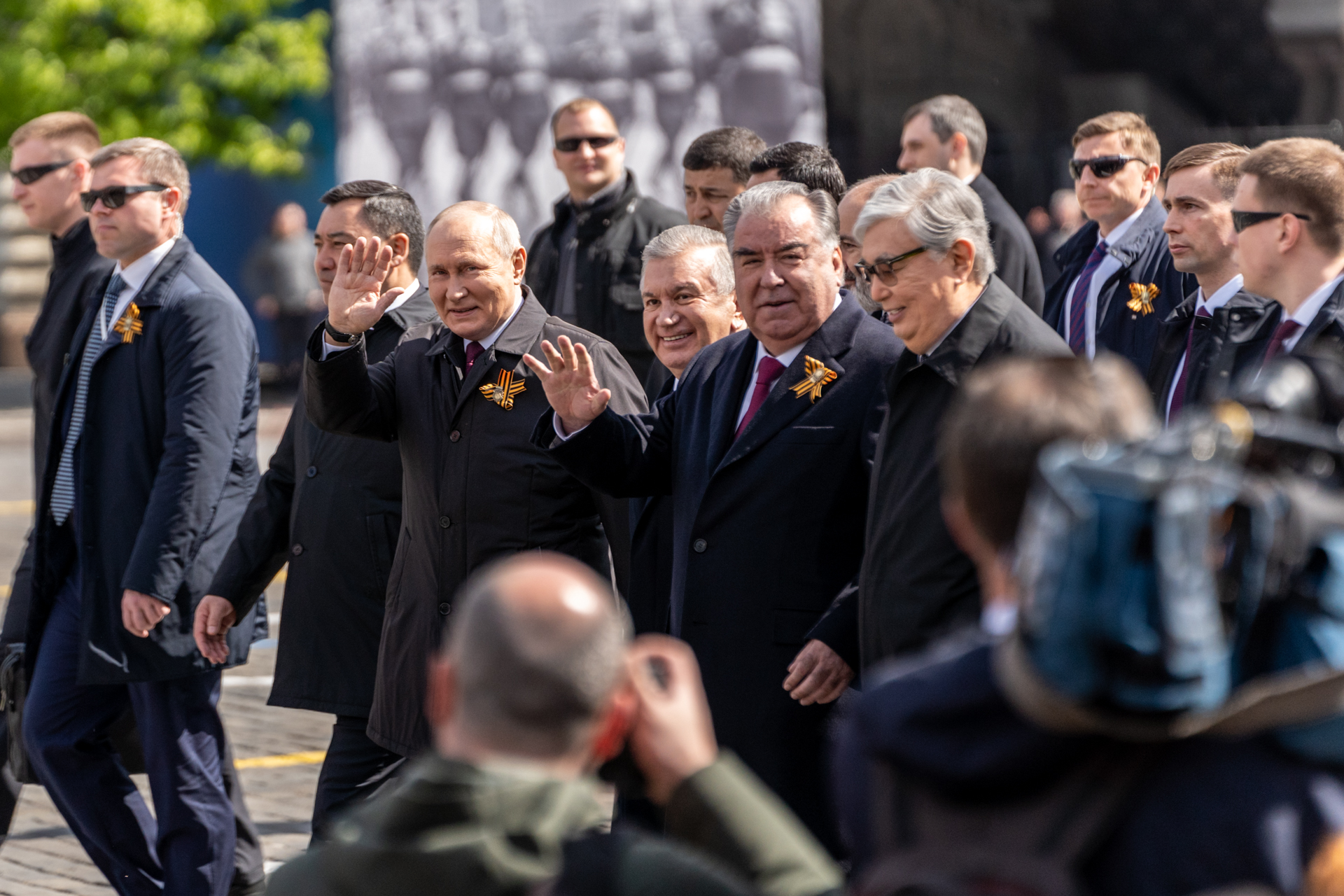
Tokayev and other post-Soviet leaders with Vladimir Putin at the 2023 Moscow Victory Day Parade

Tokayev also emphasized that Kazakhstan would comply with Western sanctions imposed on Russia after it invaded Ukraine, and that the country "will abide by the restrictions imposed on Russia and Belarus." In September 2022, Kazakhstan closed a loophole through which Russian and Belarusian trucks were able to import goods from the European Union into the country without the necessary paperwork.

Following Tokayev's electoral victory in November 2022, international observers expect him to maintain Kazakhstan's pivot towards the EU and China, and away from Russia.

In September 2022, Tokayev said that Kazakhstan would help Russians fleeing the mobilization and war in Ukraine, saying that "most of them are forced to leave because of the current hopeless situation." However, in December 2022, Kazakhstan deported back to Russia a Russian citizen who fled mobilization. In January 2023, Kazakhstan announced they were tightening visa rules, a move that is expected to make it more difficult for Russians to remain in the country.

On 9 May 2023, he attended the Victory Day parade in Moscow and met with Russian President Vladimir Putin.

On 25 July 2026, during a meeting with Russian President Vladimir Putin in Omsk, Tokayev called for the Russo-Ukrainian war to be frozen and for negotiations to resume on the basis of what he described as the “Istanbul Formula 2.0”. He said that, under security guarantees from major powers, including Russia, the two sides could move towards a lasting peace. Tokayev described the war as an interstate conflict and said that its nature was “not fully understood by many, including ourselves”. He also expressed concern over the continued loss of life, saying that “young people are dying” and that the fighting should be brought to an end. Tokayev ruled out Kazakhstan acting as a mediator, while reaffirming the country's strategic partnership and allied relations with Russia.

==== China ====
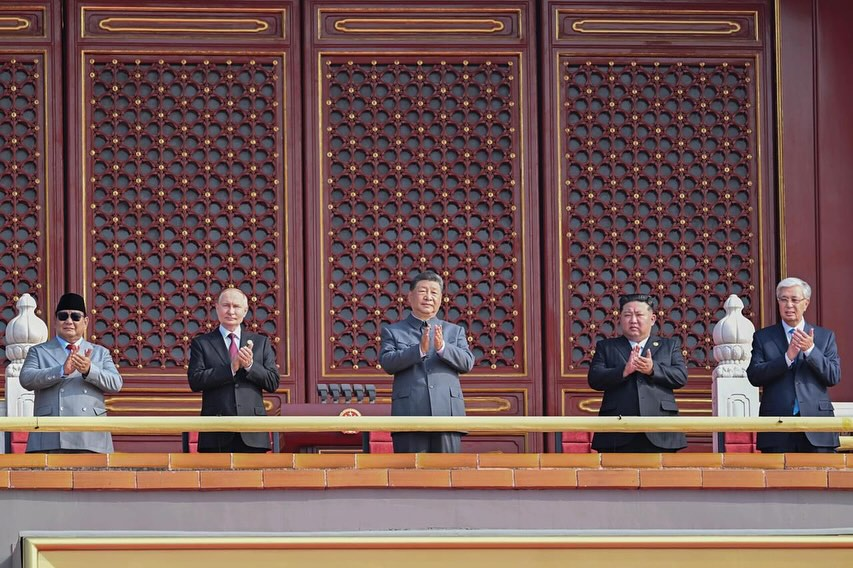
Tokayev and other leaders with Chinese President Xi Jinping at the 2025 China Victory Day Parade

Since 2022, Tokayev has consistently intensified Kazakhstan's relations with the People's Republic of China, which, as of 2024, stands as Kazakhstan’s leading trading partner and largest foreign investor. In September 2022, General Secretary of the Chinese Communist Party Xi Jinping conducted an official state visit to Kazakhstan, during which he reaffirmed China's unwavering support for Kazakhstan's sovereignty and territorial integrity, while emphasizing enhanced cooperation in trade, infrastructure development, and the energy sector.

In May 2023, Tokayev paid a working visit to Beijing, where the parties agreed to broaden economic collaboration and to elevate Kazakhstan's participation in the Belt and Road Initiative (BRI). Both nations set an ambitious target to double bilateral trade turnover in the coming years. Under Tokayev's guidance, Kazakhstan has emerged as China’s primary trade partner within Central Asia, actively engaging in strategic projects across energy, agriculture, and infrastructure, including significant involvement in the development of the Middle Corridor, a trade route connecting China with European markets.

In 2023, visa-free travel arrangements between Kazakhstan and China were expanded to facilitate tourism and strengthen cultural exchanges. Additionally, Kazakhstan continues to provide steadfast support for China's regional initiatives, such as the Shanghai Cooperation Organization and the BRI. In early 2024, China publicly endorsed Kazakhstan's bid to join the BRICS economic bloc, signaling recognition of Kazakhstan's rising international profile and the deepening of its strategic partnership with China.

==== United States ====
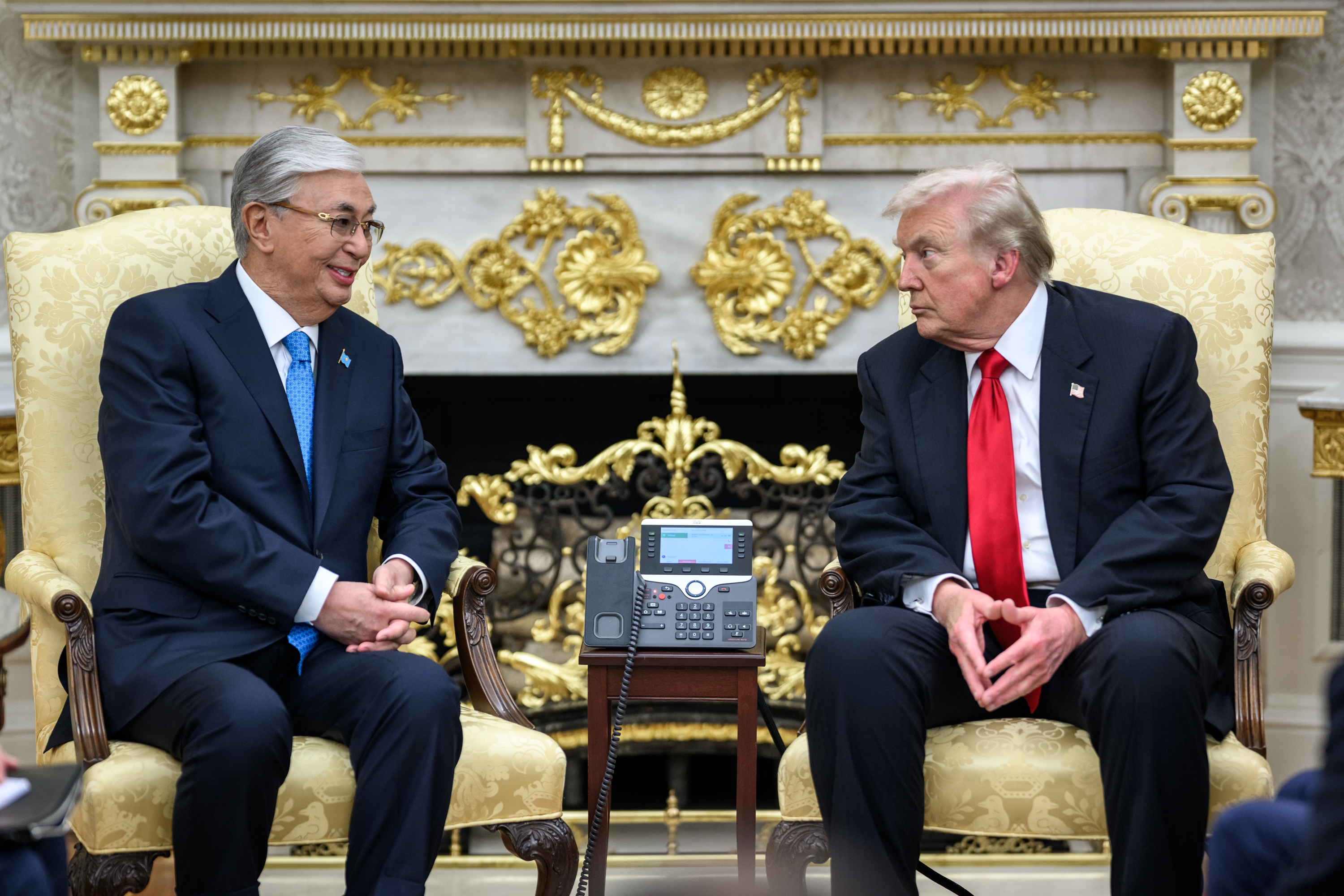
Tokayev with U.S. President Donald Trump, 6 November 2025

Tokayev has sought to strengthen Kazakhstan's ties with the United States, emphasizing a "friendly and predictable" relationship. Tokayev highlighted the importance of expanding economic and business relations with the US, particularly in energy, agriculture, and IT sectors, during his September 2022 visit to New York City.

In February 2023, Tokayev met with US Secretary of State Antony Blinken, where he thanked the United States for its support of Kazakhstan's territorial integrity following the 2022 unrest. Later in August 2023, he met with US Senator Gary Peters, reaffirming Kazakhstan's commitment to the US as a strategic partner, particularly in areas like nuclear non-proliferation and global security.

On 19 September 2023, during the first-ever U.S. presidential-hosted C5+1 summit, Tokayev met President Joe Biden. He emphasized the importance of the U.S.'s security guarantees for Central Asia and Kazakhstan's nuclear-free stance, underscoring the region's role in global efforts to prevent nuclear weapons proliferation.

In response to President Donald Trump's decision in July 2025 to impose 25% reciprocal tariffs on Kazakh goods, excluding key exports such as oil, uranium, and rare metals, Tokayev expressed Kazakhstan's commitment to constructive dialogue and voiced confidence in the possibility of reaching a mutually beneficial resolution with Washington.

== Political positions ==
Tokayev is described as a "moderate conservative" with years of political experience domestically and internationally. Nevertheless, in an interview with The Wall Street Journal, Tokayev referred himself as a "reformer", stressing that without political reforms, there wouldn't be progress in economic reforms.

According to The Diplomat, Tokayev's political capital was seen to not extend beyond the support by Nazarbayev, which enabled him to garner support and trust from business elites, civil servants, and political institutions. Because of that, Tokayev has been described as "Nazarbayev's political birthchild", while his opponents and critics referred him as "furniture" (Russian: мебель, mebel), a ridicule term first coined by exiled Kazakh businessman Mukhtar Ablyazov in 2019.

=== Authoritarianism ===
Tokayev expressed his view on Kazakhstan's political system, in which he favored a "strong President, authoritative Parliament, accountable Government."

In 2005, at the business conference of the Asian Society held in Almaty, Tokayev clashed with George Soros after his remarks about Kazakhstan sliding towards authoritarianism, calling it "unreasonable to demand from a country that recently celebrated its 13th anniversary to achieve the democratic values inherent in states with centuries-old traditions of building a free society."

=== Climate change ===
Tokayev expressed support for the tackling of climate change, calling it "urgent and existential." At the Climate Ambitions Summit in which was held remotely on 12 December 2020, Tokayev pledged for Kazakhstan to reach carbon neutrality by 2060 with a development and adoption of a long-term development strategy to lower emissions and de-carbonisation of the economy. He said that Kazakhstan is "highly vulnerable to climate change as a landlocked and developing state" with a heavy reliance on fossil fuels and proposed the planting of two billion trees within the country in order to increase carbon absorption and curb looming desertification problems.

=== Corruption ===
Tokayev described his vision regarding corruption, calling it a "direct damage to national security" and advocated for the need of accountability for implementation of state programs and the use of budget funds by äkıms. On 28 November 2019, he signed the "On Amendments and Additions to Certain Legislative Acts of the Republic of Kazakhstan on Civil Service and Anti-Corruption Issues" law into place, which obliged government ministers and äkıms to resign if the top officials within institutions are found guilty of corruption.

=== Islam ===
At the Forum of Muslim Scientists of Eurasia, which was held in Astana in March 2018, Tokayev addressed the audience on the need for the country to have "enlightened Islam" by strengthening science and cultural traditions in the Islamic civilization.

=== Relations with EU ===
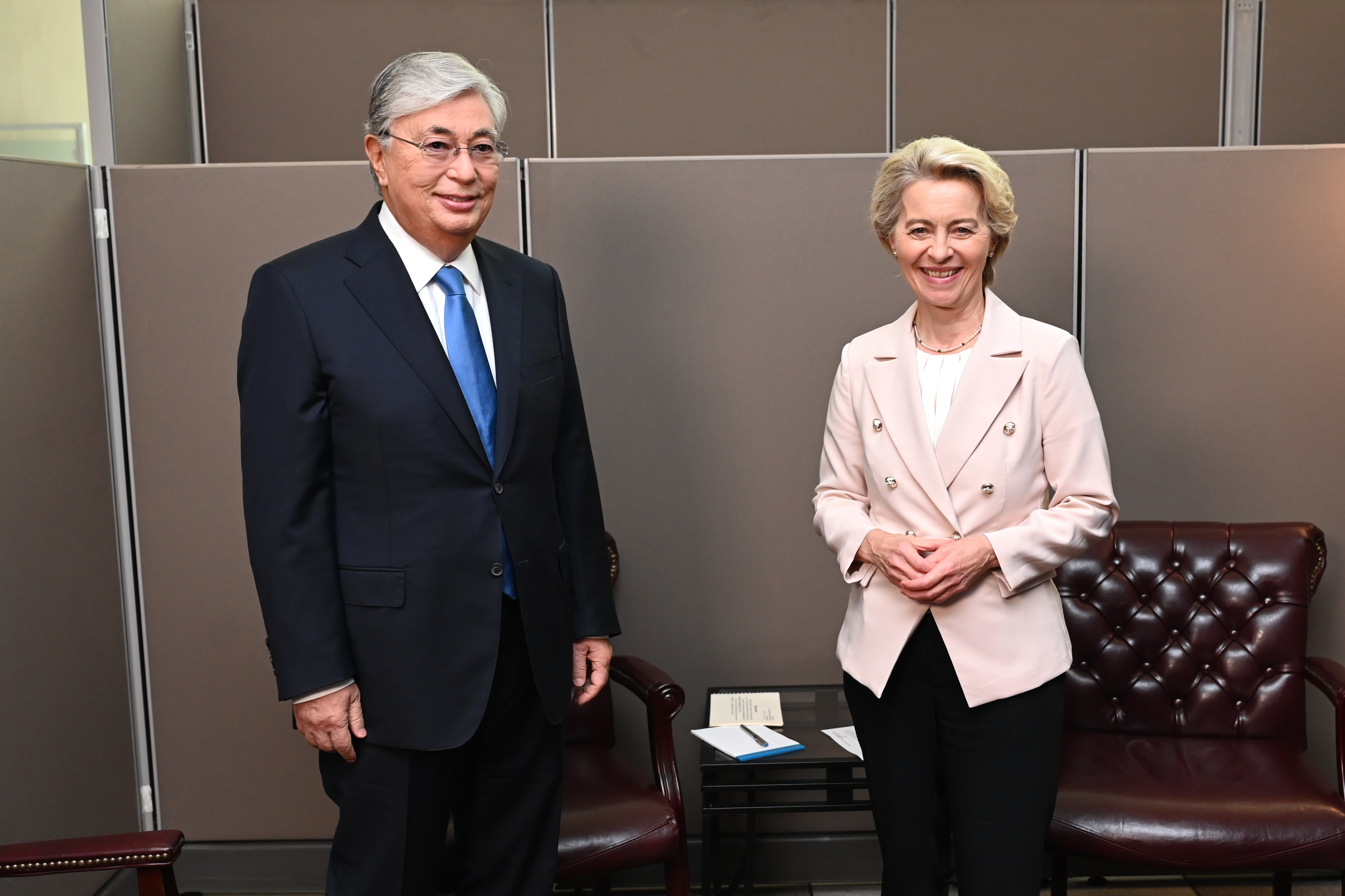
Tokayev meeting with European Commission President Ursula von der Leyen in September 2022

As a foreign minister, Tokayev visited Berlin, Germany on 3–4 October 2006, where he addressed the European Parliament's Foreign Affairs Committee on 3 October in an attempt to gain support amongst members of the Organization for Security and Cooperation in Europe for Kazakhstan's bid to lead the organisation in 2009. In his address, he discussed the "fierce" competition between the European Union, China, and India to secure energy sources, saying that Kazakhstan is "one of the very few countries capable of boosting its oil production and thus becoming an important alternative energy supplier to global and European markets." He expressed interest in the Burgas-Alexandroupoli and Odesa-Brody-Gdansk pipeline projects, asking the EU for $80 billion in investment from 2006 to 2021. Tokayev criticised Lithuania for opposing a Russian offer for its Mažeikių oil refinery. He also reaffirmed Kazakhstan's desire to join the European Neighbourhood Policy. Tokayev also rejected the proposed construction of the Trans-Caspian Gas Pipeline to Azerbaijan, in which the EU officials desired due to the likelihood of opposition from other nations bordering the Caspian Sea. Gernot Erler, an official in the German Federal Foreign Office, announced his support for Kazakhstan leading the Organization for Security and Co-operation in Europe (OSCE) for 2009. Portuguese Socialist MP Ana Gomes said to Tokayev, "Minister, you're bidding for the presidency of the OSCE. Yet, the OSCE gave a report on your last elections, on the observation of the elections, which said they failed to meet international standards for genuine elections in many important points. And we hear about political dissent being crushed, we hear even about religious groups being crushed." Tokayev replied that political opposition forces in Kazakhstan "cannot challenge the government" because of their own weaknesses, and that Kazakhstanis need to be "educated" about democracy because the concept is foreign, and the government considers religious tolerance a priority. He criticized the OSCE's election report for "technical irregularities" and biased targeting while calling for more of a "mutual understanding." He further stated that his government believes it would "contribute a lot as a representative, as a country which is located in Central Asia. The geographical dimension of the OSCE has changed [since Kazakhstan joined], saying it is now a unique Eurasian, as well as Pan-American, organization. So, the leadership, the presidency of this organization must also reflect this unique character, this unique dimension of the organization." He cited efforts to reform Kazakhstan's election process that included a "special program" to modernize the system and establishing "party dominance" in the Parliament so that "parties [that] win the parliamentary elections, obtain [a] majority in the parliament" and "will be able to establish their own governments." He called creating a multi-party system in Kazakhstan a "huge step forward in the process of democratization."

=== Relations with the United States ===
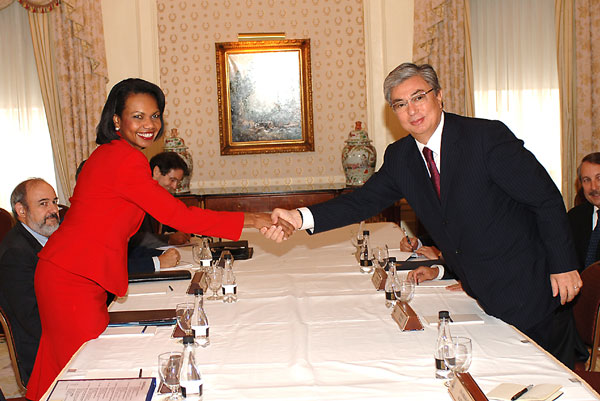
U.S. Secretary of State Condoleezza Rice with Tokayev, 25 September 2006

Tokayev met with United States Secretary of State Condoleezza Rice and Barry Lowenkron, the U.S. Assistant Secretary of State for Human Rights, on 25 September 2006 in Rice's suite at the Waldorf-Astoria hotel. According to Anne Gearan, a diplomatic writer for the Associated Press, the U.S. wanted to improve its relations with Kazakhstan. Kazakh oil output was expected to significantly increase, along with other Central Asian countries, which were "more authoritarian, too unstable, too poor, or a combination of all three." Before she met with Tokayev, Rice was asked whether human rights or energy "would top the agenda" for the meeting with Tokayev, but he refused to answer. The United States State Department released a statement saying the diplomats discussed Kazakhstan's cooperation in Afghanistan and Iraq and expressed hope for "a multidimensional relationship with Kazakhstan, which includes U.S. encouragement for continuing reforms."

=== Middle Eastern affairs ===
==== Jordan ====
On 19 February 2025, His Majesty King Abdullah II of Jordan met with President Kassym-Jomart Tokayev of Kazakhstan in Astana. During their discussions, both leaders agreed to expand mutual investments and enhance trade relations between their countries. President Tokayev congratulated King Abdullah II on the 25th anniversary of his reign, commending his efforts in promoting sustainable growth and elevating Jordan's international standing.

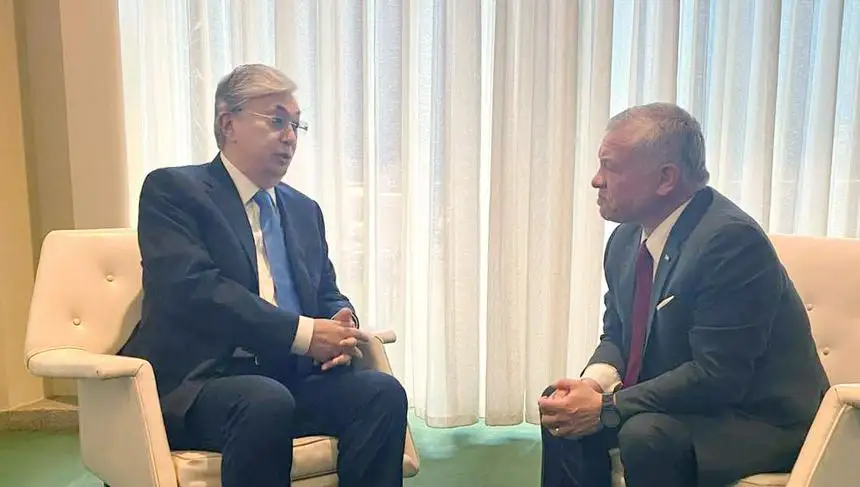
His Majesty King Abdullah II of Jordan meeting with President Tokayev of Kazakhstan

This meeting followed President Tokayev's official visit to Jordan from 18 to 19 February 2025, at the invitation of King Abdullah II. The visit aimed to strengthen cooperation in trade, economic, and cultural-humanitarian sectors. The meeting commenced with President Tokayev extending his congratulations to Abdullah II of Jordan on the occasion of the 25th year of the latter's reign, wishing him continued success in creative initiatives aimed at ensuring sustainable growth and prosperity of the people of Jordan and increasing the authority of the country on the global scene.

The Kazakh President expressed gratitude to the Jordanian leader for his contribution to enhancing friendship and cooperation ties between the two nations.

=== Russian language ===
As president, Tokayev encouraged the Kazakh public to learn Kazakh, calling it a "duty of every citizen of Kazakhstan". At the same time, he believed that strengthening the role of the Kazakh language shouldn't infringe on the Russian language, warning that improper handling of the issue would lead to "irreparable consequences" in which he compared to Ukraine that faced interethnic conflicts.

During the 2021 State of the Nation Address, Tokayev noted that Russian is an official language within Kazakhstan, adding that its use cannot be hindered in accordance with the law. He promised to punish any person who discriminates based on "linguistic and national grounds", a move that was viewed to have occurred as a result of a backlash by Russian officials after a viral incident on YouTube showing Kostanay native Quat Ahmetov visiting places and forcing employees to speak Kazakh, which led to a series of criminal cases by security agencies and Ahmetov fleeing the country.

=== LGBTQ rights ===
Tokayev has expressed a conservative stance on LGBTQ. In February 2024, he signed a law preventing LGBTQ individuals from adopting or mentoring orphans.

In 2025, Tokayev criticized the promotion of LGBTQ rights by international organizations, accusing them of interfering in sovereign nations' affairs under the guise of advancing democratic values, while masking financial corruption.

In the same year, Parliament of Kazakhstan proposed legislation that would ban "LGBT propaganda" and mirrored the 2013 Russian anti-LGBTQ law. Despite concerns by several human rights organizations, including Human Rights Watch, the draft law was approved by the Mäjilis in November 2025. It officially plans to ban "information containing propaganda of pedophilia and/or non-traditional sexual orientation in public spaces, as well as in the media".

=== Nationalism ===
Tokayev has adopted a nuanced stance on nationalism. Early in his presidency, he voiced disquiet at the prospect of nationalism becoming a dominant global force, an anxiety sharpened by the 2016 United States presidential election and the emergence of leaders such as Donald Trump. He criticised nationalism for heightening tensions between states, especially during the COVID-19 pandemic, and warned that it risked undermining international cooperation and provoking conflict and economic damage, with particularly serious consequences for a country such as Kazakhstan.

More recently, however, Tokayev has acknowledged the growing relevance of state nationalism, viewing it as a moral response to the waning influence of globalism and as a key driver in the contest for global spheres of influence.

== Honors ==
=== Kazakh ===
- Order of the Golden Eagle (2019)
- Order of Otan (2014)
- Order of Nazarbayev (2004)
- Order of Parasat (1996)
- Astana Medal
- Medal "25 years of independence of the Republic of Kazakhstan"
- Medal "10 years of Independence of the Republic of Kazakhstan"
- Medal "10 years to the Parliament of the Republic of Kazakhstan"
- Medal "10 years of Astana" (2018)

=== Foreign ===
- Order of Honour (Russia, 2017)
- Order of Friendship (Russia, 2004)
- Order of Prince Yaroslav the Wise, III Degree (Ukraine, 2008)
- Commonwealth Order (Commonwealth of Independent States, 2007)
- Order of the Serbian Flag, 1st Class (2016)
- Jubilee Medal "20 Years of the Federation Council"
- Tree of Friendship Medal (CIS, 2003)
- CIS Diploma
- Bitaraplyk Order (Turkmenistan, 2021)
- Jubilee Medal "300 Years Magtymguly Pyragy" (Turkmenistan, 2024)
- Order of the State of the Republic of Turkey (2025)
- Knight Grand Cross with Collar of the Order of Merit of the Italian Republic (29 September 2025)

=== Other ===
- Full member of the World Academy of Humanities and Natural Sciences, member of the "Council of Wise Men" of the Munich Security Conference.
- Honorary Professor of Shenzhen University.
- Honorary Professor and Honorary Doctor of the Diplomatic Academy of the Ministry of Foreign Affairs of the Russian Federation, as well as a member of its board of trustees.
- Honorary President of the Kazakhstan Council on International Relations.
- Diploma of the "Academicus" of the University of Geneva.
- S. N. Roerich Memorial Medal.
- According to the Russian Biographical Society, he entered the list of laureates of the "Person of the Year — 2018".
- Ranked among The 500 Most Influential Muslims in the annual edition of The Muslim 500.

== Personal life ==
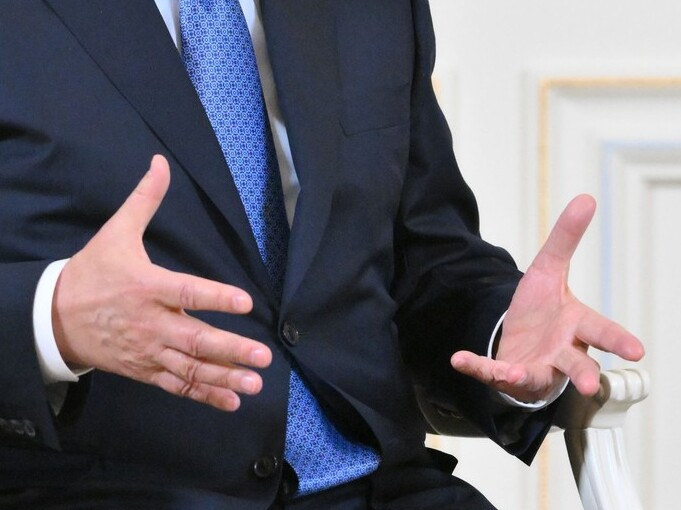
Since March 2019, Tokayev stopped wearing his wedding ring, following his divorce with Nadezhda Tokayeva.

Now divorced, Tokayev was married to Nadezhda Tokayeva, with whom he had one son. It is presumed that they divorced in March 2019, the time when the divorce was made official and Tokayev stopped wearing his wedding ring. His son Timur (born in 1984) is an oil entrepreneur who currently resides in Geneva, Switzerland. His brother-in-law Temirtai Izbastin (married to Tokayev's sister Karlygash Izbastina) is currently Kazakhstan's Ambassador to Bulgaria. Tokayev is a polyglot, fluent in Kazakh, Russian, English, Chinese, and French.

Tokayev was president of the Table Tennis Federation of Kazakhstan for 13 years. In 2025, he was awarded a ninth-degree black belt in taekwondo by World Taekwondo president Chungwon Choue during the Kazakhstan Open in Astana, reflecting his long-standing interest in the sports.

Tokayev has made it a point not to mark his birthday with celebrations, with his press secretary saying in 2020 that he "does not like to celebrate this day because his family has never celebrated the birthdays of either the children or parents".

== Books ==
Tokayev had authored some ten books as of 2024, mostly on the subject of international relations, including Overcoming about his diplomatic service published in 2003.

== See also ==
- Government of Kazakhstan
- List of current heads of state and government
- List of heads of the executive by approval rating
- Parliament of Kazakhstan
- Politics of Kazakhstan
- Tokayev Cabinet

== Notes ==
Political offices
Preceded by Kanat Saudabayev	Minister of Foreign Affairs; 1994–1999	Succeeded by Erlan Idrissov
Preceded by Nurlan Balgimbayev	Prime Minister of Kazakhstan; 1999–2002	Succeeded by Imangali Tasmagambetov
Preceded by Abish Kekilbayev	State Secretary of Kazakhstan; 2002–2003	Succeeded by Imangali Tasmagambetov
Preceded by Erlan Idrissov	Minister of Foreign Affairs; 2002–2007	Succeeded by Marat Tazhin
Preceded by Nursultan Nazarbayev	President of Kazakhstan; 2019–present	Incumbent
Party political offices
Preceded by Nursultan Nazarbayev	Chairman of Amanat; 2021–2022	Succeeded by Erlan Qoşanov
