= International Organisation for the Russian Language =

The International Organisation for the Russian Language (IORL); Russian: Международная организация по русскому языку (МОРЯ) (МОРЯ), romanized: Mezhdunarodnaya organizatsiya po russkomu yazyku, MORYA) is an international organization representing states and governments with a notable affiliation with Russian language and culture. The headquarters of the Secretariat is located in Sirius, Sochi, Russia.

== History ==
During the October 2022 summit of the Council of Heads of State of the CIS in Astana, Kazakh President Kassym-Jomart Tokayev proposed the creation of an International Organisation for the Russian Language to strengthen cultural and humanitarian ties among CIS countries, using the Russian language to foster regional cooperation and intercultural dialogue. On 12 October 2023, Tokayev approved a draft treaty for the creation of the IORL, which was later ratified by the Parliament of Kazakhstan on 20 November 2024. The treaty establishing the SEA entered into force in June 2025. It began its practical operational activities in April 2026.

== Membership ==
Country	Leader	Russian Language Status
Belarus	President Alexander Lukashenko	Official language with equal status to the Belarusian language.
Kazakhstan	President Kassym-Jomart Tokayev	Official language with equal status to the Kazakh language.
Kyrgyzstan	President Sadyr Japarov	Official language below the Kyrgyz language as the state language.
Russia	President Vladimir Putin	Sole official langaunge
Tajikistan	President Emomali Rahmon	Official Lingua franca
Uzbekistan	President Shavkat Mirziyoyev	No official status.

== See also ==
- Organisation internationale de la Francophonie
- Community of Portuguese Language Countries
- BRICS
- Commonwealth of Independent States (CIS)
- Eurasian Economic Union (EAEU)
- Organization for Security and Co-operation in Europe (OSCE)
- Shanghai Cooperation Organisation (SCO)
