= Monuments of Almaty =

Almaty monuments are works of art, mostly monuments, installed in Almaty, Kazakhstan to commemorate people or historical events.

== History ==
The state list of monuments of history and culture of national importance of Almaty city was approved by the Kazakh SSR Government Decree No. 38, January 26, 1982. The list of monuments of local importance was approved by decision No. 2/35 of the executive committee of the Almaty City Council of People's Deputies on January 26, 1984. Several additions were made in 1985–1988. In these years, the number of monuments located around the city of Almaty and protected by the state, according to the state list, was 77 units. On December 30, 2011 the government of the Republic of Kazakhstan adopted Decree No. 1672 "On deprivation of status of historical and cultural monuments of local importance to the city of Almaty and their exclusion from the State List of historical and cultural monuments of local importance. According to this decree 35 monuments are excluded from the state list of historical and cultural monuments of local importance because of complete physical loss and loss of historical and cultural value. Of these, 11 are architectural monuments: the former airport, the Medeu hotel, the house of merchant Murov, the Sofia church, the house of Hodjaev, the office of the Governor-General, the building of the Semirechensk Regional Department of Nationalities Affairs, the building of the railway station of Almaty-1 station, a department store, the club-theater of the Kazakh SSR NKVD, the house of gardener Breusov; nine monuments of monumental art: two monuments to V. Lenin, a monument to Sergey Kirov, a bust of L. P. Emelev, a bust of P. Vinogradov, a monument to the fighters of the October Revolution, a monument to M. Frunze, a monument and a bust of M. Kalinin; also 15 archaeological monuments: mounds located in the districts of Uljan, Kokkainar, Stroitel, Zarya Vostoka. In 2006, the city had 133 monuments of history and culture, 87 of architecture and 46 of monumental art, of which 30 were of national importance.

The newest monument in Almaty is the Statue of Unity, erected in March 2026. It commemorates a human-chain-dog-rescue in a channel (Big Almaty River) that feeds Sayran Reservoir. The rescue was filmed and became a viral video in 2016. The sculptor is Yerbosyn Meldibekov (Russian: Ербосын Мельдибеков).

== List of monuments by city districts ==
=== Almaly district ===
Image	Name and location	Description
	Monument-bust to the pilot S. D. Luganskiy, twice Hero of the Soviet Union (Abylai Khan Ave., between Aiteke Bi St. and Gogol St.)	Installed in 1947 by the Decree of the Presidium of the Supreme Soviet of the USSR of July 1, 1944. Sculptor – N.I. Pavlov, architect – I.I. Belotserkovsky. The bust is made of bronze, mounted on a pedestal lined with grey granite.
	Monument-bust to the writer and playwright Mukhtar Auezov (the square to the east of the Abay Opera and Ballet Theater)	Installed in 1967. Sculptor – T.S. Dosmagambetov, architect – M. Mendikulov. Molten from cast iron, the pedestal is made of gray granite of rectangular shape. There is a stepped stylobate
	Monument-bust to akyn poet Zhambyl (the square to the west of the Abay Opera and Ballet Theater)	Installed in 1971. Sculptor – H.I. Nauryzbaev, architect – M. Mendikulov. The monument-bust with a height of 2.3 m is made in one piece with a pedestal of gray granite. The sculptural image conveys the image of an akyn at the moment of creative state
	Monument to M.O. Auezov (On Abay Avenue in front of the Kazakh Drama Theatre named after M.O. Auezov)	The monument was opened in 1980. Sculptor – E.A. Sergebaev, architects – O.Zh. Baimurzaev, A.S. Kainarbaev. Made of bronze, the pedestal – of dark grey granite. The writer is sitting in an armchair in a thoughtful pose, with a book in his right hand. The monument conveys the complex and manifold inner world of Auezov.
	Monument-bust to revolutionary and writer Sabir Sharipov (public garden at the intersection of Karasai Batyr Street and Seyfullin Avenue)	Installed in 1980. Sculptor – P.I. Shorokhov. Cast in bronze, pedestal is made of granite. The height is 3.8 m.
	Monument to A. Moldagulova and M. Mametova, Heroes of the Soviet Union (Square in front the KBTU building between Tolebi and Bogenbai Batyr Streets)	The opening of the monument took place on October 25, 1997, at the ceremony attended by the President of Kazakhstan, members of the government. Sculptor – Satybaldin K. K., architects – T. Yeraliev, V. Sidorov, designer – M. E. Erkenov. The pedestal depicts two Gold Stars of Hero of the Soviet Union and the names of the girls in Kazakh language: "Әлия" and "Мәншүк". The plot of the monument is conventional, as Aliya and Manshuk did not even know each other. The monument is installed on the site of the monument to Lenin.
	Monument-bust to the writer and poet Sabit Mukanov (Square at the intersection of Tolebi and Mukanov Street)	The monument was unveiled in 2000 (by the centenary of the writer) as part of the anniversary celebrations under the auspices of UNESCO. Architect: T. Janysbekov. Bronze bust. Three-stepped stylobate on the site. The pedestal is rectangular in the form of a prismatic stele, flanked by narrow rectangular plates. On the obverse is a text, carved in shallow relief. The height of the monument is 2 m.
	Monument to party and statesman Temirbek Zhurgenev (In front of the Academy of Arts)	Opened on December 6, 2001. Sculptor – E. A. Sergebaev. Installed in front of the Kazakh National Academy of Arts named after T.K. Zhurgenov.
	Monument to Indian politician Mahatma Gandhi (the park in the square of Shevchenko, Gagarina, Dzhambul and Zharokov streets)	The monument was installed in October 2003. Sumitra Kulkarni, granddaughter of Gandhi, attended the opening ceremony. The monument was initiated by the Indian Embassy, which financed its installation as part of the India Days in Kazakhstan. The author of the monument was Gautam Pal, a sculptor from Mumbai. By its appearance it is a copy of the Moscow monument to Mahatma Gandhi of the same author, opened on 8 July 1988 in Indira Gandhi square.
	Raimbek Batyr Mausoleum (on Raimbek Ave.)	Opened in 1994 at the burial place of the batyr.
	Monument to the repressed akyn Turmagambet Iztleuov (square on Kabanbai Batyr Street, corner of Nauryzbai Batyr Street)	Established November 2, 2007 to the 125th anniversary of the repressed akyn, who was born in 1882 in modern Kyzylorda region, shot by the NKVD in 1939.
	Monument to Uyghur composer and teacher Kuddus Kuzhamyarov (intersection of Karasai Batyr St., former Vinogradov St. and Nauryzbai Batyr St. near the Uigur Theater)	The monument was opened in July 2008, sculptor – Magamed Abdullaev, architect – Arkin Mametbakiev.
	The monument to the Kazakh akyn of the 19th century, Kurmangazy (in front of the Kazakh National Conservatory on Ablay-Khan Avenue)	The monument was opened on April 18, 2012, sculptor T. Binashev
	Memorial to Denis Ten (the intersection of Baiseitova and Kurmangazy streets)	Opened in 2019. Sculptor: Matvey Makushkin. On the granite pedestal are carved lines from Denis' poem and his sporting achievements.
	Monument to Askar Tokpanov (Panfilov street corner of Bogenbai Batyr street)	Askar Tokpanov – the first professional Kazakh theater director, founder of the school of theater skills (Zhurgenovka). Installed in 2015. Sculptor: Yesken Sergebaev.
	Monument to the victims of the famine of 1931–1933 (Naryzbai Batyra street corner of Karasai Batyra street)	The year of opening – 2017. Authors: Dulat Usenbaev, Aidos Burkitbaev and Kanat Beguliev.

=== Auezov district ===
Image	Name and location	Description
Памятник революционеру В. И. Ленину	Monument to Lenin (originally located in a public garden on the Astana Square, now located in a public garden behind the Sary-Arka cinema)	The monument was opened on November 7, 1957 in Lenin Square (now Astana Square). In 1997 it was moved to the square behind the cinema "Sary-Arka". Sculptor – E. Vuchetich, architect – I. Belotserkovsky. The height is 12 meters, made of bronze and red granite. The monument depicts Vladimir Lenin at the moment of his speech to the people.
	Monument to the Fighters of the October Revolution (originally on Pushkin Street, the intersection with Raimbek Avenue, now in a park near the Sary-Arka movie theater)	Installed in 1967 to the 50th anniversary of the Revolution. Sculptor – N.S. Zhuravlev, architects – I.I. Tokar, B.P. Voronin. The height is 5,9 meters. The monument is in the form of multifigured sculptural group, depicting fighters for Soviet power in Semirechye. The composition includes a plaque with the inscription: "Your eternal feat will live forever in the hearts of grateful descendants". The pedestal is faced with red granite. It was dismantled in the summer of 2012 and moved to the square behind the "Sary-Arka" cinema.
	Monument to M. V. Frunze (the square behind the cinema "Sary-Arka")	Installed in 1967 in a square on Kabanbay Batyr Street, corner of Nauryzbai Batyr Street, in February 2007, moved to the square behind the movie theater "Sary-Arka". Sculptor – A. Isaev, architect – I. Belotserkovsky. Made of bronze, a pedestal of complex configuration – from gray granite. The height is 4.5 m.
	Monument-bust to P.M. Vinogradov (public garden at the intersection of Karasay Batyr street (former Vinogradov) and Nauryzbai Batyr street (former Dzerzhinsky), now located in the park at the Sary-Arka cinema)	The bust was installed in 1956. Sculptor – B.I. Urmanche. The 1,7 m high bust is cast in bronze, cone-shaped polished pedestal is made of red granite. Built in memory of the Bolshevik revolutionary Pavel Vinogradov, whose work was associated with the city of Verny. Dismantled in the summer of 2012 and was moved to the square behind the cinema "Sary-Arka".
	Monument to the revolutionary Lukyan Yemelyov (Emeleva Street, corner of Gogol Street, now lost)	Built in 1967. Sculptor E.T. Mergenov, architect Sh. I. Valikhanov). The monument-bust of cast iron was installed on a square pedestal, made in a strict rectangular shape, lined with gray polished granite. The monument was 3 metres high. It was established in Dostyk street, below Gogol street. In the beginning of 2000's it was demolished. It was installed in honor of Yemelyov Lukian Potapovich, an active participant of the Civil War, the struggle for the establishment of Soviet power in Semirechye, Verny.
	Monument to M.I. Kalinin ( the square behind the Sary-Arka Cinema)	The monument was established in 1972 near the station of Alma-Ata-2 railway station, in 2001 it was moved to the square behind the "Sary-Arka" cinema. Sculptors - H.I. Nauryzbaev, V.Y. Rakhmanov, architects – A. Abdaliev, A. Ordabaev. The monument is 3,7 m high and is made of gray granite, it recreates the image of M.I. Kalinin at the moment of his speech to the people.
	Monument to Maxim Gorky (the square behind the Sary-Arka Cinema)	The monument was installed in 1940 in the central alley of the Gorky Central Park of Culture and Recreation, and in 2015 it was demolished and moved to the square behind the Sary-Arka movie theater.
	Monument to soldiers of the Great Patriotic War (Central Cemetery of Raimbek Ave. and Ryskulov St.)	It was established in 1976 on a communal grave, where were buried 560 soldiers of the Soviet Army and Navy who died from wounds in hospitals of Almaty. The authors were A. Abdaliyev, S. Fazilov and others. The composition of the monument is based on a spire that is 9 meters high. The pedestal of black gabbro on which the names of soldiers are inscribed, is combined with a three-dimensional granite stylobate. The composition is completed by the figure of a soldier with a machine gun and helmet, cast in reinforced concrete.
	Bust monument to Turar Ryskulov	
	Monument to A. Rozybakiyev (in the courtyard of School No. 153)	
	Monument "Eternal Glory to Those Who Fought for the Motherland" (in the courtyard of School No. 92)	
	Monument "Eternal Memory to Fallen Heroes" (in the courtyard of school 149, Aigerim microdistrict)	
	Monument "Be Worthy of the Fallen" (Taugul microdistrict)	The monument is located on the territory of the former state farm "Taugul", it was built in 1985 in memory of the fallen 11 soldiers-farmers at the expense of the inhabitants of the state farm. Authors of the monument are unknown. The monument in the form of a tulip is made entirely of red granite.

=== Bostandyq district ===
Image	Name and location	Description
	Monument to revolutionary Uraz Dzhandosov (intersection of Dzhandosov Street and Gagarin Avenue)	Installed in 1969. Sculptor – N.S. Zhuravlev, architect – T.S. Suleimenov. Cast in cast iron, one and a half meter pedestal made of gray granite.
	Monument of Independence (Republic Square)	The monument was established in 1996 on the initiative of the President of the Republic of Kazakhstan Nursultan Abishevich Nazarbayev. Authors: Shota Valikhanov – head of the creative team, Adilet Zhumabaev – sculptor, Nurlan Dalbaev – sculptor, Kazybek Zharylgapov – architect, Kairat Suranchiev – sculptor. Co-authors: Kaldybay Montakhaev – architect, Murat Mansurov – sculptor, Azat Bayarlin – sculptor, Kazybek Satybaldin – sculptor.
	Monument to Academician Kanysh Satpayev (Satpayev Street, corner of Baitursynov Street, in front of Satpayev KazNTU building)	A monument to the geologist, the first president of the Academy of Sciences of Kazakhstan, K. I. Satpayev, was installed in 1999 for the 100th anniversary. Sculptor T.S. Dosmagambetov, architect A.S. Kainarbayev.
	Monument to artist Abilkhan Kasteev (Satpayev Street, in front of the Kasteev State Museum of Art)	Monument to Kasteev was installed in 2004, the year of the centenary of the artist in front of the Kasteev State Museum of Fine Arts. Sculptor N.A. Dalbaev, architect R.M. Satybaldiev. The figure shows seated artist with a palette and brush in his hands cast in bronze. The composition is presented on a pedestal of red-brown marble.
	Monument "Tauelsizdik Tany" (Dawn of Freedom), intersection of Zheltoksan and Satpayeva Streets	Established in 2006 to commemorate the 20th anniversary of the December 1986 events in Almaty. The opening ceremony was attended by the President of Kazakhstan Nursultan Nazarbayev. The architect is Timur Suleimenov.
	Monument to the opera singer Kulyash Bayseitova (the square near the K. Bayseitova Music School. K. Baiseitova on Baizakov Street, below Timiryazeva Street)	Installed September 15, 2011 on the eve of the 100th anniversary of the singer. Author – sculptor T. Binashev.

=== Jetysu district ===
Image	Name and location	Description
	Monument to revolutionary Amangeldy Imanov (Abylai Khan Avenue, the square between Mametova Street and Makatayeva Street)	Installed in 1947, the grand opening of the monument was attended by a prominent statesman A. T. Dzhangildin. Sculptor – Khasbulat Askar-Saryja, architect – T. K. Basenov. The monument is cast in bronze, the pedestal is made of gray granite, fine bouchard technique with ornaments. The height of 6 meters. Expressive volumetric detail, emphasizing the movement of the figure.
	Monument to Abylai Khan (square in front of Almaty-2 station)	The monument to Abylai Khan was installed in Almaty on December 16, 2000, on the station square in front of the Almaty-2 station building. The head of the team of authors is S.K. Baimagambetov, sculptor – K.K. Satybaldin, architects – T.E. Eraliev, Z.S. Baimagambetov, V.I. Sidorov, designer – M.E. Erkinov, foundry work – A.V. Volkov.
	Monument to writer and playwright Gabit Musrepov (Abylai Khan Ave., square in front of the Kazakh Theater for Children and Youth)	Installed in 2002 for the centennial of the writer.
	Monument to the poet and writer Mukagali Makataev (Park on Makataev St., corner of Zheltoksan St.)	Installed December 16, 2002 after the 70th anniversary of the poet. Sculptor N.A. Dalbaev, architect Р. M. Satybaldiev.

=== Medeu district ===
Image	Name and location	Description
	Monument to rock musician Viktor Tsoi (on the corner of Tolebaeva Street and Kabanbai Batyr Street – the final scenes of the film "Needle" were shot here)	The monument was unveiled on June 21, 2018
	Monument to the poet and philosopher Abai Kunanbayev (Abai Square in front of the Palace of the Republic, the intersection of Dostyk Ave. and Abay Ave.)	Installed in 1960. From the foot of the monument begins Abay Avenue, which goes to the west, to the residential areas. Authors of the monument: sculptor H. I. Nauryzbaev, architect I. I. Belotserkovsky. The total height of the monument is 13,7 m. The sculpture is cast in bronze. The pedestal form is trapezoidal, made of red granite. The figure of Abay is in movement. He is holding a book in his left bent hand, and his right hand is holding the flaps of a chapan thrown over his shoulders. The thinker's head is fulfilled volumetrically. The face is given an expression of thoughtfulness, the gaze is directed into the future.
	Bust to revolutionary D.A. Furmanov (on Nazarbayev Street (former Furmanov street), corner of Kurmangazy Street)	Installed in 1967. Sculptor – N.S. Zhuravlev, architect – H. Yakupbayev. Bust cast in bronze, installed on a pedestal of polished granite. The height is 2.7 m. Dismantled on the night of July 25, 2018, moved to the square behind the cinema "Sary-Arka".
	Monument to General I.V. Panfilov. (Park named after 28 Panfilov Guardsmen, in the south part, the intersection of Dostyk Ave. Dostyk Ave. and Kazybek Bi St.)	Installed in 1968. Authors: sculptor – B.A. Tulekov, architect – T.K. Basenov. The monument-bust is cast in bronze. The height is 2 meters, the pedestal is rectangular and made of gray granite.
	Monument to the scientist and ethnographer Shoqan Valikhanov (intersection of Valikhanov and Shevchenko streets, in front of the Academy of Sciences of Kazakhstan)	Installed in 1969. Sculptor Kh. I. Nauryzbaev, architect – Sh. E. Valikhanov (State Prize of the Kazakh SSR in 1970). The monument is 8 meters high and is cast in bronze. The pedestal and stylobate are made of polished black gabbro. On the back of the pedestal the designed with Kazakh national ornaments and drawings of Sh. Valikhanov.
	Monument to the founder of the Komsomol in Kazakhstan Gani Muratbayev (Intersection of Dostyk Ave. Dostyk and Satpayev Streets, in front of the facade of the Almaty Palace of Schoolchildren)	Installed in 1972. Sculptors – T. Dosmagambetov, O. Prokofiev, architects – Sh. Valikhanov, A. Kainarbaev.
	Memorial of Glory (Park named after 28 Panfilov Guardsmen from the eastern side)	It was constructed in 1975 to the 30th anniversary of the WWII victory, the same year the Eternal Flame was lit. The opening of the memorial complex of the four parts was held May 8, 1975. The first part – the high relief "Oath" (on the left side) – is dedicated to the young fighters for the Soviet Power in Kazakhstan. The central part of the triptych, The Deed, depicts the images of Panfilov heroes who defended Moscow with their chests.
	Monument-bust to the Soviet party figure D.A. Kunayev (public garden on the corner of Kunayev and Bogenbai batyr streets)	Built in 1978 to commemorate the services of twice Hero of Socialist Labor (in 1982 – three times Hero) D. Kunayev. Sculptors – T.S. Dosmagambetov, A.B. Tatarinov, architects – A.K. Kapanov, Sh.E. Valikhanov, I.Ya. Tokar, B.V. Dmitrievsky. The bronze bust is made in the traditional classical style. The strict and laconic forms of the pedestal made of polished granite emphasize the unity of style of the sculptural and architectural composition.
	Monument to revolutionary Tokash Bokin (28 Panfilov Guardsmen Park on the west side)	Installed in 1980. Sculptor – B. A. Abishev, architect – Sh. I. Valikhanov. Executed in the form of a monument-bust which is 5 m high and made of gray granite. The belted figure, carved from a granite rectangle, creates a dynamic image of T. Bokin.
	Monument to the soldiers Yuri Direktorchuk and Anatoly Dukhovich, who died in 1968 (corner of Dostyk Ave. - Kazybek Bi street)	A small granite obelisk, the inscription "June 19, 1968, saving the lives of children killed soldiers SASO: Private Y. Direktorchuk, year of birth 1948; Private A. Dukhovich, year of birth 1946." On June 19, 1968, privates Yuri Direktorchuk and Anatoly Dukhovich were driving a ZIL-164 tanker with broken brakes while driving down Lenin Street. At the intersection with Sovetskaya Street, a large group of schoolchildren was crossing the street and a bus was pulling out. Without thinking, the soldiers swerved to the side and crashed into a huge poplar tree. The fuel tanker, which held over two tons of fuel, exploded. Apart from the soldiers, no one was injured. The existing monument was erected on May 7, 1987. In February 2021 it was damaged in a traffic accident.
	Monument to the poet akyn Zhambyl (intersection of Dostyk Ave. and Zhambyl St. in front of the Iskra Cinema)	A new monument to Zhambyl Zhabayev was built to commemorate the 150th anniversary of the akyn in 1996. Architects – S. Baimagambetov, T. Yeraliev, S. Fazilov and sculptor B. Abishev. The monument to the great poet is cast in bronze and conveys the image of an akyn at the moment of his creative state. The akyn looks thoughtfully into the distance, while holding a dombra in his left hand, and on the right side is a rock – a piece of Trans-Ili Alatau nature, from which two springs gush out.
	Monument to Alexander Pushkin (in the square on the east side of the Academy of Sciences of Kazakhstan)	Monument was established on October 29, 1999 in honor of the poets 200th anniversary.
	Monument to Taras Shevchenko (intersection of Dostyk Ave. and Shevchenko St.)	A monument to the Ukrainian poet Taras Shevchenko, who lived in western Kazakhstan during his exile (1847–1857), was erected at the intersection of Dostyk Avenue and Shevchenko Street in August 2000, to mark the ninth anniversary of Ukrainian independence.
	Monument to composer and teacher Mukan Tulebayev (Tulebayev St., corner of Abay Ave.)	The monument was installed in 2002. The authors were Almaty sculptor E. Rakhmadiev and architect K. Zharylgapov. The cost of the work was 17 million tenge, which was allocated by the city Akimat.
	Monument to Kazakh warriors who died in Afghanistan (Park named after 28 Panfilov Guardsmen, near the Memorial of Glory)	It was opened on February 15, 2003. Sculptor: Kazbek Satybaldin. Architects: Tokhtar Yeraliev and Vladimir Sidorov.
	Monument to the British rock band "The Beatles" (Kok-Tobe Mountain)	Installed on May 15, 2007. It is made of bronze, sculptor Edward Kazarian. The composition shows John Lennon sitting with a guitar in his hand, George Harrison, Ringo Starr and Paul McCartney standing.
	Bust of Abay Kunanbayev (at the entrance to the main building of KazNPU named after Abay, Dostyk Ave.)	
	Monument to the scientist and archaeologist Alkei Margulan (the park on the west side of the building of the Academy of Sciences of Kazakhstan)	It was opened on January 14, 2010. The author of the powerful monument of Korday granite weighing 8 tons was Kazakh sculptor N. Dalbai.
Памятник Бауыржану Момыш-улы.	Monument to Hero of the Soviet Union Bauyrzhan Momyshuly (28th Guardsmen-Panfilov Park, north side)	It was opened on December 10, 2010. The authors of the monument were Kazakh sculptor Nurlan Dalbay and architect Rasul Satybaldiyev. The total height of the monument is six meters. The figure of Bauyrzhan Momyshuly is executed in full height. Cast in bronze, the base – from granite
	Monument to the singer and dombrist Zhusupbek Yelebekov. Installed opposite to the Republican Variety and Circus College named after him (on the corner of Bogenbai Batyr and Valikhanov Streets)	Opened on October 8, 2011.
	Monument to composer and conductor Nurgisa Tlendiev (Nazarbayev Street, in the square above the Central State Museum of the Republic of Kazakhstan)	It was opened on October 15, 2011. The monument is a full-length figure of the composer on a pedestal. The authors are sculptor and foundry worker M. Azmaganbetov and architect K. Zharylgapov. The base is made of granite, the sculpture – of bronze, the total height of the monument – 9 meters.
	Monument to Raiymbek Batyr located on the eponymous avenue.	Monument to the 18th century batyr who liberated Semirechye from the Dzungar invaders. The equestrian monument with a height of 12 meters was installed on December 7, 2012. Sculptor Yedige Rakhmadiev. On the pedestal there are engraved years of Batyr's life and lines from a poem by Mukagali Makatayev: «Ұрпағына медет бер, Ұлы бабам!».
	Monument to the singer and dombrist Kenen Azerbayev	Installed on December 11, 2013 in the "Mountain Giant" microdistrict.

=== Turksib district ===
Image	Name and location	Description
	Monument to the revolutionary Alibi Dzhangildin (the station square of Almaty-1 railway station)	Installed in 1975. The team of authors (sculptors – T. Dosmagambetov, O. Prokopyeva, architect – Sh. Valikhanov) received the State Prize of the Kazakh SSR in 1976. The height of the monument is 11 meters. The sculptural image of Alibi Dzhangildin is made of complex granite pedestal with an ornamental belt. The sculptural solution of the monument conveys the inner energy and purposefulness of A. Dzhangildin.
Памятник Ленину	Lenin Monument (in the Lenin Square, Seyfullin Avenue, corner of Sholokhov street)	Installed in 1981. The monument is a copy of the monument to Lenin, erected in 1940 in front of the Institute of Marxism–Leninism on Tverskaya Square in Moscow. The author of the original is one of the coryphaei of Soviet sculpture, Sergey Merkurov.
