= Stanislav Kankurov =

Kazakh politician (born 1985)

- Станислав Канкуров

Chairman of the Almaty City Branch of Amanat
- Incumbent
- Assumed office 14 April 2023
- Preceded by: Meyirjan Otynşiev

Secretary of the Almaty City Mäslihat
- In office 15 January 2021 – 19 January 2023
- Preceded by: Qaldybai Qazanbaev
- Succeeded by: Meyirjan Otynşiev

Member of the Almaty City Mäslihat
- Incumbent
- Assumed office 20 March 2016
- Preceded by: Aqylbai Saparov
- Succeeded by: Zia Talğatov (2023)
- Constituency: Bostandyq District, No. 19 (2016–2021); Amanat Party List (2021–present)

Personal details
- Born: 20 December 1985 (age 40) Kaskelen, Kazakh SSR, Soviet Union
- Party: Amanat (since 2022)
- Education: Moscow State University; D. Kunaev University; Central Asian University

Stanislav Vladimirovich Kankurov (Russian: Станислав Владимирович Канкуров, IPA: [stənʲɪˈslaf vlɐˈdʲimʲɪrəvʲɪtɕ kənˈkurəf]; born 20 December 1985) is a Kazakh politician who is the chairman of the Almaty City branch of the Amanat ruling party since 2023 and a deputy of the Almaty City Mäslihat since 2016.

Kankurov was the Secretary of the Almaty City Mäslihat from January 2021 to January 2023 and the First Deputy Chairman of the Amanat party's Almaty branch from October 2018 to January 2021.

== Biography ==
=== Early life and education ===
Born in the village of Kaskelen about 20 km away from Almaty, Kankurov studied at the Moscow State University where he earned his degree in economics and then graduated from D. Kunaev University specializing in law. At the Central Asian University, Kankurov studied computer science and software.

=== Career ===
Kankurov began his career in 2005 as a specialist and chief specialist of Technical Inventory of Property LLP then as the company's director of technical Inventory. From 2006, he worked at the JSC PSTK Bitelecom. While working there, he was Vice President of the Kazakhstan-2030 Support for the Program of the President of the Republic of Kazakhstan from 2010. In 2011, Kankurov became the First Deputy Chairman of the Nur Otan Bostandyq District Branch where he was until 2013, when he was appointed as Deputy Chairman of the Nur Otan Almaty City Branch, eventually becoming the First Deputy Chairman from 4 October 2018 to 20 January 2021.

=== Political career ===
In March 2016, Kankurov was elected as a deputy of the 6th Almaty City Mäslihat from the 19th Bostandyq District constituency. From there, he served as member of the Mäslihat Standing Committee on Construction and Land Relations. At the 2021 Almaty City Mäslihat elections, Kankurov was included in the Nur Otan party-list and participated in the televised debates between the party's representatives of the city branch. After being re-elected, he was unanimously chosen to be Secretary of the City Mäslihat at the age 35, becoming the youngest person to hold such post.

After the 2023 election of the 7th Mäslihat, a new chairman, Meyirjan Otynşiev, was elected as Kankurov's successor, though Kankurov continued his membership in the legislature.
