= Kazakhstan's 4th electoral district =

Electoral district No. 4
- Kazakh: №4 сайлау округі Russian: Избирательный округ №4
- Single-mandate constituency for the Mäjilis
- District: Almaly, Jetisu and Turksib
- City: Almaty

Current constituency
- Created: 2004; 2022 (re-established)
- Seats: 1
- Party: Independent
- Deputy: Erlan Stambekov
- Elected: 2023

The Electoral district No. 4 (Kazakh: №4 сайлау округі, romanized: №4 sailau okrugı; Russian: Избирательный округ №4) is a single-mandate territorial constituency in Kazakhstan, represented in the lower chamber Mäjilis of the Parliament. It is located in the city of Almaty and includes the districts of Almaly, Jetisu and Turksib.

The constituency was originally formed for the 2004 legislative election and existed until being abolished in 2007. However, it has been reestablished in 2022 and is currently represented by deputy Erlan Stambekov (Independent) since March 2023.

== Geography ==
The Electoral district No. 4 is situated in the northeastern part of Almaty and includes the city districts of Almaly, Jetisu and Turksib. It shares borders with No. 12 (Almaty Region) to the north and No. 11 (Almaty Region) to the east, along with No. 3 (Almaty) to the west and No. 5 (Almaty) to the south.

== History ==
The Electoral district No. 4 was formed for the 2004 legislative election as a result of redistribution within the boundaries of Almaty, and Sergey Boyarkin served as deputy from the constituency. From there, the electoral district continued to exist until its dissolution following the 2007 constitutional amendment, which led to the abolition of all constituencies as part of the transition from a mixed-member majoritarian representation to a nationwide party-list proportional representation system. The change affected the composition of all seats in the lower chamber Mäjilis of the Kazakh Parliament beginning with the 2007 legislative election.

On 24 December 2022, the Electoral district No. 4 was reestablished by the Central Election Commission, which came into effect on 1 January 2023 as a result of the 2022 amendment. The adoption of this amendment marked the reintroduction of a mixed electoral system for electing Mäjilis deputies, with the use of numbered constituencies being reinstated for the first time since 2004. It made its debut in the 2023 legislative election, with Erlan Stambekov becoming the elected representative of the constituency.

== Members ==
Election	Member	Party	%
2004	Sergey Boyarkin	AIST	52.1
2007	Defunct constituency (Nationwide PR)		
2012	Defunct constituency (Nationwide PR)		
2016	Defunct constituency (Nationwide PR)		
2021	Defunct constituency (Nationwide PR)		
2023	Erlan Stambekov	Independent	20.7

== Election results ==
=== 2023 ===
Candidate	Party	Votes	%
Erlan Stambekov	Independent	15,930	20.66
Sanjar Boqaev	Independent (Namys)	11,660	15.12
Konstantin Malinovsky	Russian Community of Kazakhstan	7,957	10.32
Serik Abdrahmanov	Independent	7,031	9.12
Saltanat Ämirğalieva	Independent	3,404	4.41
Erbolat Qasymov	Independent	2,704	3.51
Aibar Mälik	Independent	2,493	3.23
Däulet Äbilqasymov	Independent	2,468	3.20
Nazigül Şaimardanova	Respublica	1,634	2.12
Ädil Ahmetov	Federation of Kazakhstani Motorists	1,569	2.03
Others		15,977	20.72
Against all		4,277	5.55
Total		77,104	100.00
Valid votes		77,104	100.00
Invalid/blank votes		0	0.00
Total votes		77,104	100.00
Independent gain			
Source: CEC
