= Kazakhstan's 5th electoral district =

Electoral district No. 5
- Kazakh: №5 сайлау округі Russian: Избирательный округ №5
- Single-mandate constituency for the Mäjilis
- District: Bostandyq, Medeu and Nauryzbai
- City: Almaty

Current constituency
- Created: 2004; 2022 (re-established)
- Seats: 1
- Party: Independent
- Deputy: Baqytjan Bazarbek
- Elected: 2023

The Electoral district No. 5 (Kazakh: №5 сайлау округі, romanized: №5 sailau okrugı; Russian: Избирательный округ №5) is a single-mandate territorial constituency in Kazakhstan, represented in the lower chamber Mäjilis of the Parliament. It is located in the city of Almaty and includes the districts of Bostandyq, Medeu and Nauryzbai.

The constituency was originally formed for the 2004 legislative election and existed until being abolished in 2007. However, it has been reestablished in 2022 and is currently represented by deputy Baqytjan Bazarbek (Independent) since March 2023.

== Geography ==
The Electoral district No. 5 is situated in the southern part of Almaty and includes the city districts of Bostandyq, Medeu and Nauryzbai. It shares borders with No. 3 (Almaty) to the northwest and No. 4 (Almaty) to the northeast, along with No. 12 (Almaty Region) to the southwest and No. 11 (Almaty Region) to the southeast.

== History ==
The Electoral district No. 5 was formed for the 2004 legislative election as a result of redistribution within the boundaries of Almaty, and Turarbek Asanov served as deputy from the constituency. From there, the electoral district continued to exist until its dissolution following the 2007 constitutional amendment, which led to the abolition of all constituencies as part of the transition from a mixed-member majoritarian representation to a fully party-list proportional representation system. The change affected the composition of all seats in the lower chamber Mäjilis of the Kazakh Parliament beginning with the 2007 legislative election.

On 24 December 2022, the Electoral district No. 5 was reestablished by the Central Election Commission, which came into effect on 1 January 2023 as a result of the 2022 amendment. The adoption of this amendment marked the reintroduction of a mixed electoral system for electing Mäjilis deputies, with the use of numbered constituencies being reinstated for the first time since 2004. It made its debut in the 2023 legislative election, with Baqytjan Bazarbek becoming the elected representative of the constituency.

== Members ==
Election	Member	Party	%	Representing region
2004	Turarbek Asanov	Independent	72.6	Almaty
2007	Defunct (Single-nationwide PR constituency)			
2012	Defunct (Single-nationwide PR constituency)			
2016	Defunct (Single-nationwide PR constituency)			
2021	Defunct (Single-nationwide PR constituency)			
2023	Baqytjan Bazarbek	Independent	21.6	Almaty

== Election results ==
=== 2023 ===
Candidate	Party	Votes	%
Baqytjan Bazarbek	Independent (Amanat)	22,685	21.59
Muqtar Taijan	Independent (Jer Qorgany)	12,882	12.26
Dinara Egeubaeva	Independent	9,562	9.10
Mahambet Hasenov	Respublica	7,863	7.48
Aibek Barysov	Independent	7,658	7.29
Aset Mataev	Independent	7,653	7.28
Nuraly Amanjolov	People's Party of Kazakhstan	3,344	3.18
Mels Eleusizov	Independent	2,815	2.68
Äbdiqahar Seiitjanov	Independent	2,441	2.32
Abzal Aidarhanov	Independent	2,297	2.19
Others		21,607	20.57
Against all		4,258	4.05
Total		105,065	100.00
Valid votes		105,065	96.73
Invalid/blank votes		3,553	3.27
Total votes		108,618	100.00
Independent gain			
Source: CEC
