= Erlan Stambekov =

Kazakh politician and businessman (born 1966)

- Ерлан Стамбеков
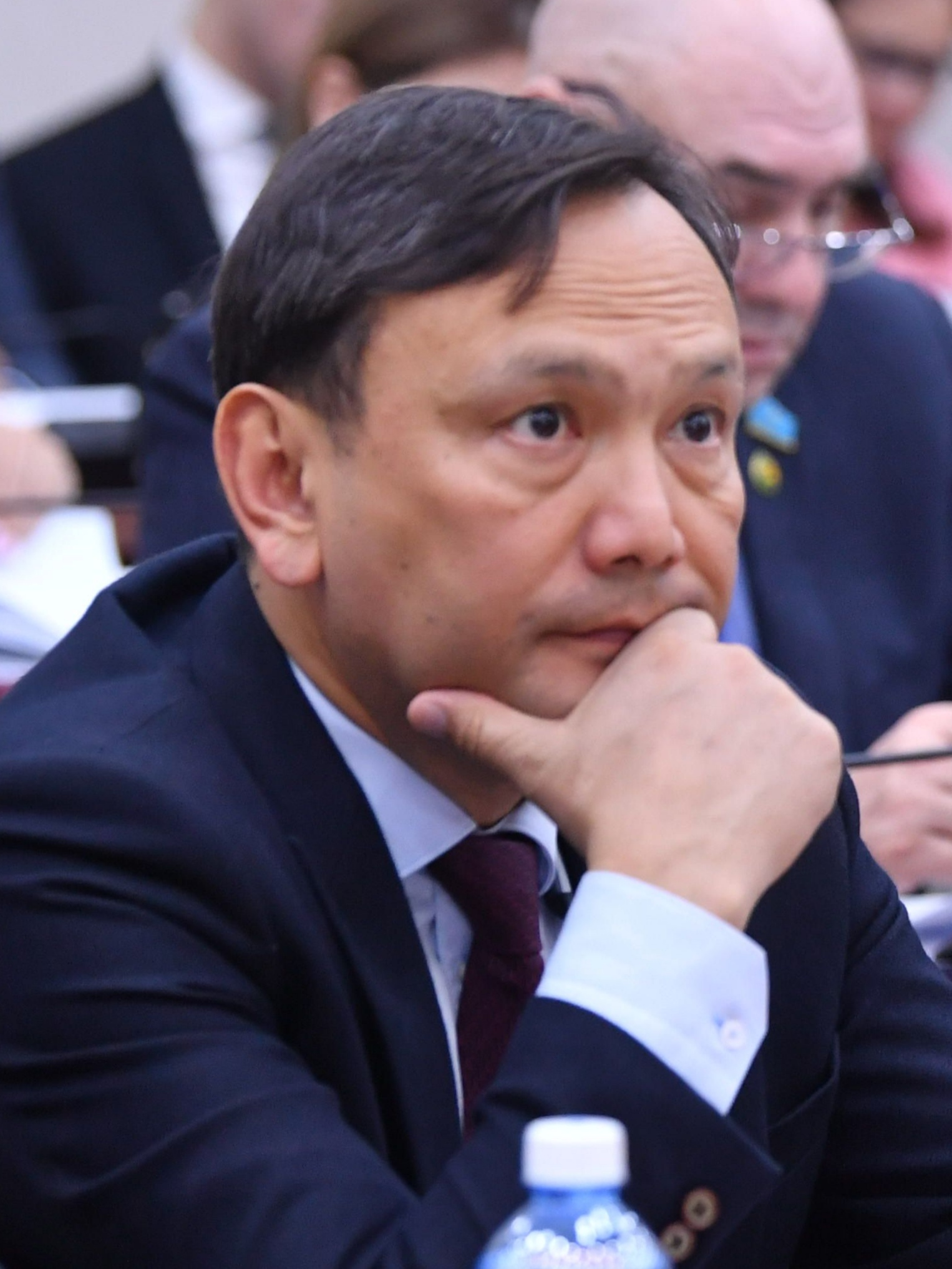
- Stambekov in 2023

Member of the Mäjilis
- In office 29 March 2023 – 1 July 2026
- Preceded by: Constituency reestablished; Sergey Boyarkin (2007)
- Constituency: Almaty, No. 4

Member of the Almaty City Mäslihat
- In office 25 March 2016 – 3 April 2018
- Preceded by: Seilbek Qalaqov
- Succeeded by: Ashat Şilikbaev
- Constituency: No. 25

Member of the Almaty City Council of People's Deputies
- In office March 1989 – November 1993

Personal details
- Born: 17 December 1966 (age 59) Alma-Ata, Kazakh SSR, Soviet Union
- Party: Independent
- Other political affiliations: Nur Otan (2000–2019)
- Children: 4
- Education: Alma-Ata Institute of Architecture and Construction
- Website: stambekov.kz

Military service
- Allegiance: Soviet Union
- Branch/service: Soviet Armed Forces
- Years of service: 1985–1987

Erlan Däuletūly Stambekov (Kazakh: Ерлан Дәулетұлы Стамбеков, [jerˈɫɑn əstʰɑmˈbʲekɘf]; born 17 December 1966) is a Kazakh politician and entrepreneur who served as a member of the Mäjilis from 2023 to its dissolution in 2026. He previously served in the local government as a deputy of the Almaty City Mäslihat from 2016 to 2019, and a deputy in the Alma-Ata City Council of People's Deputies from 1989 to 1993.

Throughout his career, Stambekov has held various roles in business, government, and energy sectors.

== Early life and career ==
Born and raised in Almaty, Stambekov completed his education at Alma-Ata Secondary School No. in 1984. He then attended the Alma-Ata Institute of Architecture and Construction, where he earned a degree in engineering and economics in 1991. After his first year of college, Stambekov served in the Soviet Armed Forces for two years, from 1985 to 1987.

After graduating from the Institute, he began his career as a broker at the Alma-Ata Stock Exchange. He later became the director of the International Trade House "Anar", a position he held from 1992 to 1997.

Following that, Stambekov along with his partners launched the Alacard project, introducing smart cards to the gas station market in Kazakhstan for corporate clients. This initiative was notably successful, marking the first use of smart cards in the country's financial and fuel sectors.

During the early 2000s, Stambekov ventured into the oil and gas sector. He initially served as the first deputy director of the RSE Main Dispatch Department of the Oil and Gas Complex under the Ministry of Energy and Mineral Resources. In 2001, he progressed to the role of first deputy director general of the Ministry of Energy and Mineral Resources. During the period of 2001 to 2003, Stambekov served as the general director of ALA Data Systems Ltd. Subsequently, he held the position of director of the corporate development department of KazTransOil from 2003 to 2004.

Stambekov returned to his role as general director of ALA Data Systems ltd in 2004. Additionally, he served as the president of Alacard Petroltech.

Later, he got into many roles such as the president of the Kazakhstan Union of Industrialists and Entrepreneurs, as well as in director of the Atameken National Chamber of Entrepreneurs of Almaty from October 2013 to July 2014, chairman of the Regional Council of the Atameken from 18 December 2015 to 2018. During his tenure at Atameken, he proposed an anti-crisis measure by revising tax legislation and providing amnesty for debtor entrepreneurs, describing the tax representatives as being "almost extortionists".

== Political career ==
Stambekov first entered politics in 1989 as a legislator of the Alma-Ata City Council of People's Deputies. He was given the responsibility of heading the Commission on Youth Affairs, Physical Education and Sports, Afghan Warriors, and became a member of the city council under Äkim Zamanbek Nurkadilov. In the same year, Stambekov played a role in the return of the Tai Kazan shrine from St. Petersburg to Kazakhstan.

He unsuccessfully sought a deputy seat as independent candidate in the Mäjilis during the 2004 legislative election from the Electoral district No. 7 of Almaty.

In March 2016, Stambekov was elected as a deputy of the Almaty City Mäslihat from the No. 25 constituency of Jetisu District. He served in the position until resigning on 3 April 2018 citing reasoning "a number of international projects" as his reason for stepping down.

Stambekov had been a member of the ruling Nur Otan party since 2000, before officially leaving in 2019 due to disagreements with the party's direction and the Kazakh government's handling of the 2019 presidential election protests.

=== Member of the Mäjilis ===
On 29 March 2023, Stambekov officially assumed office as a deputy of the 8th convocation of the Mäjilis, where he became a member of the Committee on Finance and Budget.

==== Elections ====
2023

In the 2023 legislative election, Stambekov ran as an independent candidate for the Electoral district No. 4 seat, representing the city of Almaty. During the election, the constituency remained competitive as several polls varied data of candidates receiving support no more than 7%. Stambekov was viewed as one of lesser candidates by political observers. Despite the general outlook, Stambekov secured the constituent seat, winning 15,930 votes (20.7%) in the crowded race. This led to challenge of the election results by his runner-up challenger Sanjar Boqaev, who accused Stambekov in illegally winning a rigged vote. Boqaev, in possession of allegedly compiled 101 election protocols, showed Stambekov of only winning 2,825 votes and taking third place in race behind Konstantin Malinovsky. Stambekov slammed claims by Boqaev and his campaign team as "harassment and manipulation." In an interview to Ulysmedia.kz, Stambekov voiced his confidence on the election integrity and that "everyone had equal and fair conditions", not ruling out the possibility of debating Boqaev over the disputed results of the constituency vote.

During one of the interviews he gave during his 2023 pre-election campaign, Stambekov, while referring to the people who died during the 2022 Kazakh unrest, claimed that he "swore on their blood" that the country would see changes and everything wouldn't just "boil down to simple slogans", and that he wouldn't just "do nothing" if it was going otherwise. These words were later criticized by a human rights activist Alnur Ilyashev as insensitive and contradictory to Stambekov's prior political stance. Ilyashev also claimed that by being elected to Parliament, Stambekov would "unfortunately" only promote and become part of the system built by Nursultan Nazarbayev.

== Other activities ==
Stambekov is said to be actively engaged in charity, leading the Paryz charitable foundation since 2004 and managing various projects aimed at aiding children's expensive surgeries. He also hosts tourist events like the annual festival Toiqazan, celebrating the national cuisine of Kazakhstan's people. In a 2016 interview to Tengrinews.kz, Stambekov expressed his interest in developing Toiqazan festival similarly to the Oktoberfest.

He initiated the annual Alma-Qala apple tree planting campaign in 2014 and organized public hearings on conversion of Almaty CHP-2 to natural gas by the AlES company.

Stambekov is said to have an interest in writing poetry and music. In 2014, he released an album titled Somewhere (Где-то), with the collaboration of poet Vasily Gavrililidi. Stambekov is also one of the founders of the musical group The Magic of Nomads.

== Personal life ==
Stambekov is married and has four children. Stambekov is said to have a passion for sports, practicing karate techniques, playing football, and enjoying hiking.

== Discography ==
=== Albums ===
- Somewhere (Где-то) (2014)
