= 2021 Almaty City Mäslihat election =

| ← 2016 | 10 January 2021 | 2023 → |

All 39 seats in the Almaty City Mäslihat 20 seats needed for a majority
- Turnout: 30.25%
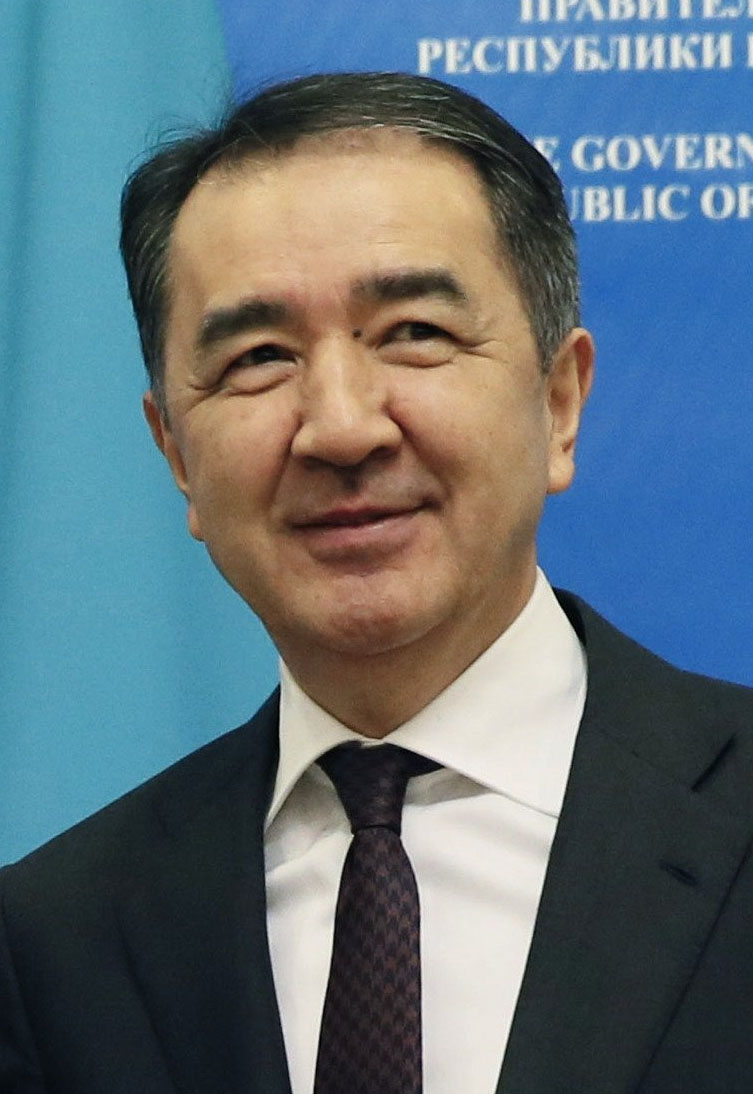
| | First party | Second party |
|---|---|---|
| | | Aq Jol |
| Leader | Bakhytjan Sagintayev | Quandyq Bisqultanov |
| Party | Nur Otan | Aq Jol |
| Leader since | 5 July 2019 | 9 December 2019 |
| Seats won | 29 | 15 |
| Popular vote | 218,003 | 32,367 |
| Percentage | 68.11% | 10.11% |
| | Third party | Fourth party |
| | Auyl | QHP |
| Leader | Mahambet Hasenov | Älibek Şapenov |
| Party | Auyl | QHP |
| Leader since | 10 July 2020 | 18 March 2017 |
| Last election | New | New |
| Seats won | 3 | 3 |
| Seat change | ▲3 | ▲3 |
| Popular vote | 24,591 | 23,388 |
| Percentage | 7.68% | 7.31% |
Secretary before election
Qaldybai Qazanbaev
Nur Otan
Elected Secretary
Stanislav Kankurov
Nur Otan

Elections to the Almaty City Mäslihat were held on 10 January 2021 to elect 39 deputies of the Almaty City Mäslihat. This was the first time that all city deputies were elected under party-list proportional representation.

The Nur Otan won majority of 29 seats in the Almaty City Mäslihat followed by the other 3 parties.

== Background ==
In the aftermath of the 2016 City Mäslihat election, the ruling Nur Otan party members.

In 2018, the Government of Kazakhstan approved a new constitutional amendment which would allow all Mäslihat elections to be conducted through party-list proportional representation. However, the move lead for self-nominated (independent) candidates from contesting in the race as all the mäslihats (local assemblies) required its members to be affiliated registered political party.

In December 2019, the City Mäslihat during its convocation tenure unanimously voted for approval of the draft Almaty-2050 Development Strategy aimed to solve the problems in Almaty and improve lives of citizens. As a result of the COVID-19 pandemic in Kazakhstan, the city suffered setbacks in declining economy, investments, and an increase in inflation due to quarantine measures and lockdowns that were implemented. City councillor Qairat Qudaibergen was reported to have tested positive for COVID-19. In December 2020, during a briefing, Almaty äkim Bakhytzhan Sagintayev stated that the economy had stabilized and that it has a "potential for rapid recovery in the post-epidemic period."

== Electoral system ==
The City Mäslihat deputies are directly-elected through proportional representation for a five year term and must win the 7% electoral threshold to win any seats. If only one party manages to pass the threshold, then the other party with the second most received votes is awarded enough seats to have representations in the City Mäslihat.

== Parties ==
Five parties submitted their list to the Almaty City Territorial Election Commission, which included:

| Name | | Ideology | Branch leader | No. 1 in party-list | No. of candidates | Registration date |
|---|---|---|---|---|---|---|
| Nur Otan | Nur Otan | Big tent | Bakhytjan Sagintayev | Zhansaya Abdumalik | 78 | 18 November 2020 |
| Auyl | Auyl | Agrarianism | Mahambet Hasenov | Mahambet Hasenov | 6 | 30 November 2020 |
| QHP | People's Party of Kazakhstan | Socialism | Älibek Şapenov | Älibek Şapenov | 14 | 9 December 2020 |
| ADAL | Adal | Eco-socialism | Ğani Abadan | Rauan Bugybaev | 5 | 8 December 2020 |
| Aq Jol | Aq Jol | Liberalism | Quandyq Bisqultanov | Alia Bekkujina | 15 | 8 December 2020 |

== Results ==
The Nur Otan won 68.1% of the vote, gaining a majority of 29 seats in the City Mäslihat. The other 3 contesting parties for the seats managed to enter the City Mäslihat, except for the Adal which narrowly missed the 7% electoral threshold to win any seats.

| Party | Votes | % | Seats | +/– |
|---|---|---|---|---|
| Nur Otan | 218,003 | 68.11 | 29 | +29 |
| Ak Zhol Democratic Party | 32,367 | 10.11 | 4 | +4 |
| Auyl People's Democratic Patriotic Party | 24,591 | 7.68 | 3 | +3 |
| People's Party | 23,388 | 7.31 | 3 | +3 |
| Adal | 21,733 | 6.79 | 0 | 0 |
| Total | 320,082 | 100.00 | 39 | 0 |
| Valid votes | 320,082 | 93.75 | | |
| Invalid/blank votes | 21,349 | 6.25 | | |
| Total votes | 341,431 | 100.00 | | |
| Registered voters/turnout | 1,132,298 | 30.15 | | |
Source: Territorial Election Commission of Almaty

Popular vote
| Nur Otan | 68.11% |
| Ak Zhol | 10.11% |
| Auyl | 7.68% |
| QHP | 7.31% |
| Adal | 6.79% |

City Mäslihat seats
| Nur Otan | 77.55% |
| Ak Zhol | 10.25% |
| Auyl | 7.69% |
| QHP | 7.69% |
| Adal | 0% |
