= Nauryzbai District =

Coordinates: 43°10′N 76°50′E

Nauryzbay district
- City Districts
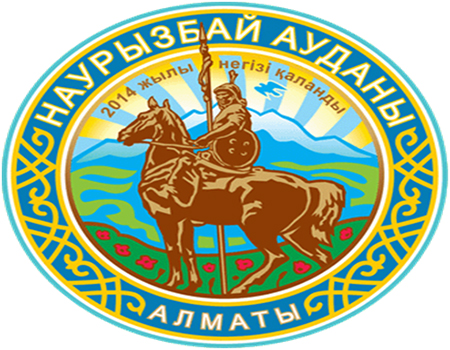
- Seal
- Interactive map of Nauryzbay district
- Country: Kazakhstan
- Province: Almaty

Government
  - Akim: Nazira Togizbayeva
- Time zone: UTC+6 (UTC+6)

Nauryzbay district is a district of Almaty, Kazakhstan.

== History ==
Since when the lands of the Karasay District were annexed to Alma-Ata, there was a significant increase in the territory and population of the Auezov district, on July 2, 2014, at the extraordinary XXIX session of the Maslikhat, it was decided to form a new, eighth district from part of the lands of the Auezov and Bostandyq Districts. The area was named after the Kazakh batyr-commander Nauryzbai — who participated in the liberation battles against the Dzungarian invaders in the XVIII century.
