= Almaty Central Stadium =

Multi-purpose stadium in Kazakhstan

Central Stadium (Almaty)

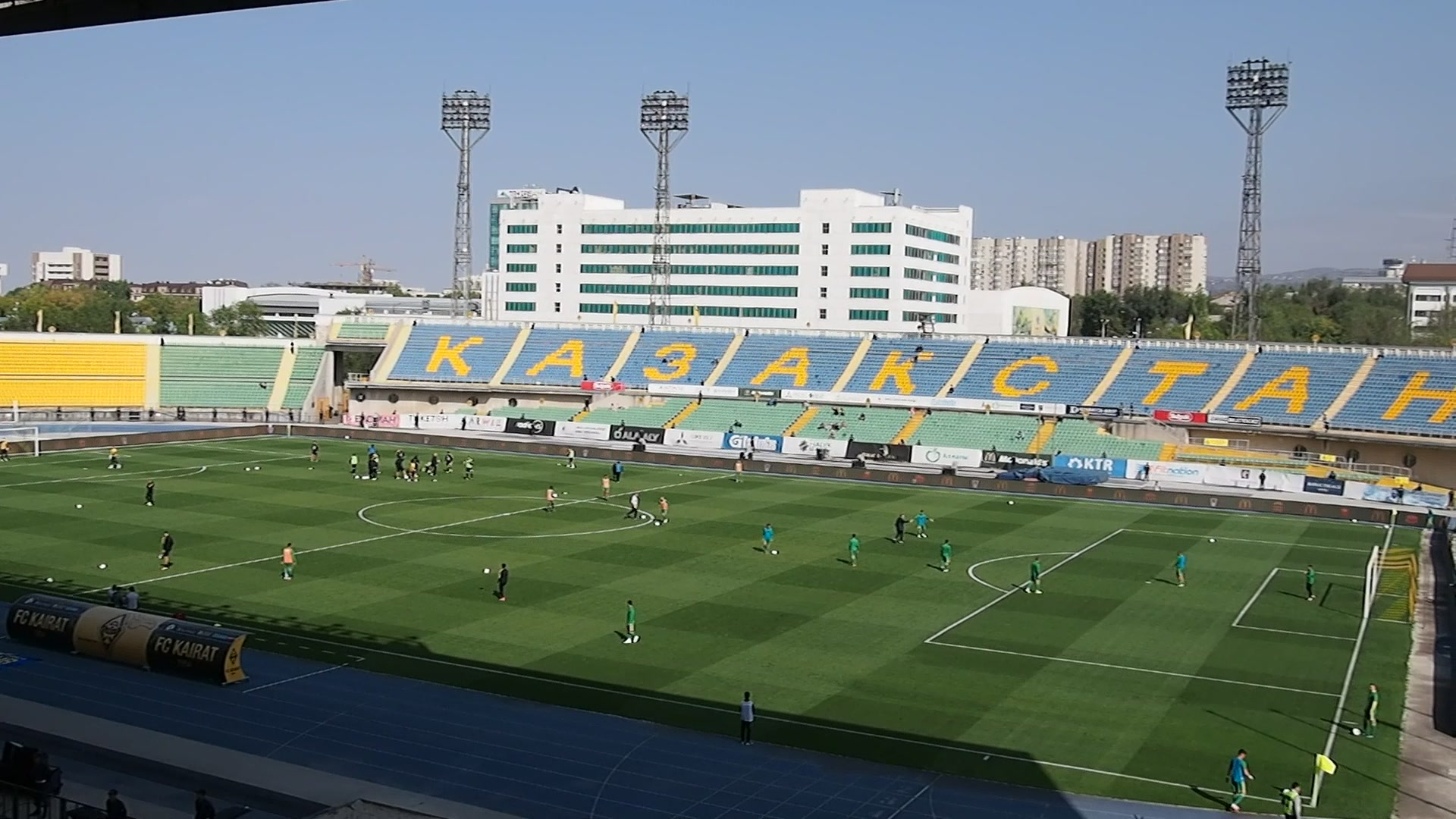
- UEFA
- Interactive map of Central Stadium (Almaty)
- Location: Almaty, Kazakhstan
- Coordinates: 43°14′18″N 76°55′28″E
- Owner: Municipality of Almaty
- Capacity: 23,804
- Surface: Grass
- Record attendance: 25,000 (Kazakhstan-Portugal 21 November 2007)
- Field size: 105x68

Construction
- Built: 1958
- Opened: 1958
- Renovated: 1997, 2004, 2011

Tenants
- FC Kairat (1957–present); Kazakhstan national football team Kazakhstan national rugby union team

Almaty Central Stadium (Kazakh: Алматы орталық стадионы, romanized: Almaty ortalyq stadiony, simply referred to as the Central Stadium (Kazakh: Орталық стадион, romanized: Ortalyq stadion), is a multi-purpose stadium in Almaty, Kazakhstan and the largest sports complex in the country. It is currently used mostly for football matches. The stadium is shared by FC Kairat Almaty. It also serves as the home stadium for the Kazakhstan national football team.

== History ==
The sports complex, consisting of several sports facilities, was built between 1955 and 1975. A large sports arena, a small sports arena (stadium) and athletics hall (wrestling hall, multi-purpose sports hall) as well as a reserve football field with athletics tracks were built on an area of 22 hectares. In 1955-1958 architects Adambek Kapanov (chief architect of the project) and A.Ya. Kossov built the large sports arena consisting of a 104x69 meter soccer field, eight 100 and 400 meter running tracks, athletics sectors for jumping and throwing. The grandstands of the large arena were designed for thirty-thousand seats. Under the arena were the halls for sports events, wrestling, boxing, as well as rooms for coaches, referees and doctors. The small arena included a five-thousand seat stadium, an archery field (onion field), tennis and handball courts. The athletics hall was built in 1975.

=== Refurbishment ===
In 1997 the Central Stadium was reconstructed in preparation for the second Central Asian Games. During the reconstruction, the latest track and field surface of the Italian company Mondo was laid. This was the same surface which had been installed for the 1996 Olympic Games in the USA.

In 2002, Kazakhstan became a member of UEFA. In order to bring the entire stadium infrastructure up to the minimum UEFA standards, funds from the city budget were allocated for the refurbishment including repairs to the metal roof over the west stand, a construction of more than three hundred and fifty tons and the replacement of plastic seats. As a result of these activities, the stadium received a license to host international matches.

In 2009-2010, following new UEFA requirements and with a view to the planned Asian Winter Games in 2011, a major reconstruction of the Central Stadium was carried out at a cost of 3 billion Tenge, financed from the city budget. At the same time, the turf of the soccer field was replaced by an innovative turf consisting of natural grass with synthetic fiber implants. The irrigation and heating of the turf is regulated by an implemented software control. The stadium was re-opened on September 18, 2010. The size of the pitch was adapted to UEFA requirements from the previous 104x69 meters to 105x68 meters. Modern running tracks, made of high-quality material "Kanipur-M" of the newest Swiss coating Konica, were also installed. These running tracks had been installed for the first time in the stadium in Berlin for the World Athletics Championships in 2008. In addition, the Central Stadium's sports equipment, furnishings and floodlights were also renewed; Photo finish and timing systems were installed. The interior spaces under the stands, as well as communications, underwent extensive renovation.

In September 2011, the surface of the Central Stadium was awarded a special certificate of the International Association of Athletics Federations (IAAF), category 2, which entitles it to host international level athletics competitions.

== Overall information ==
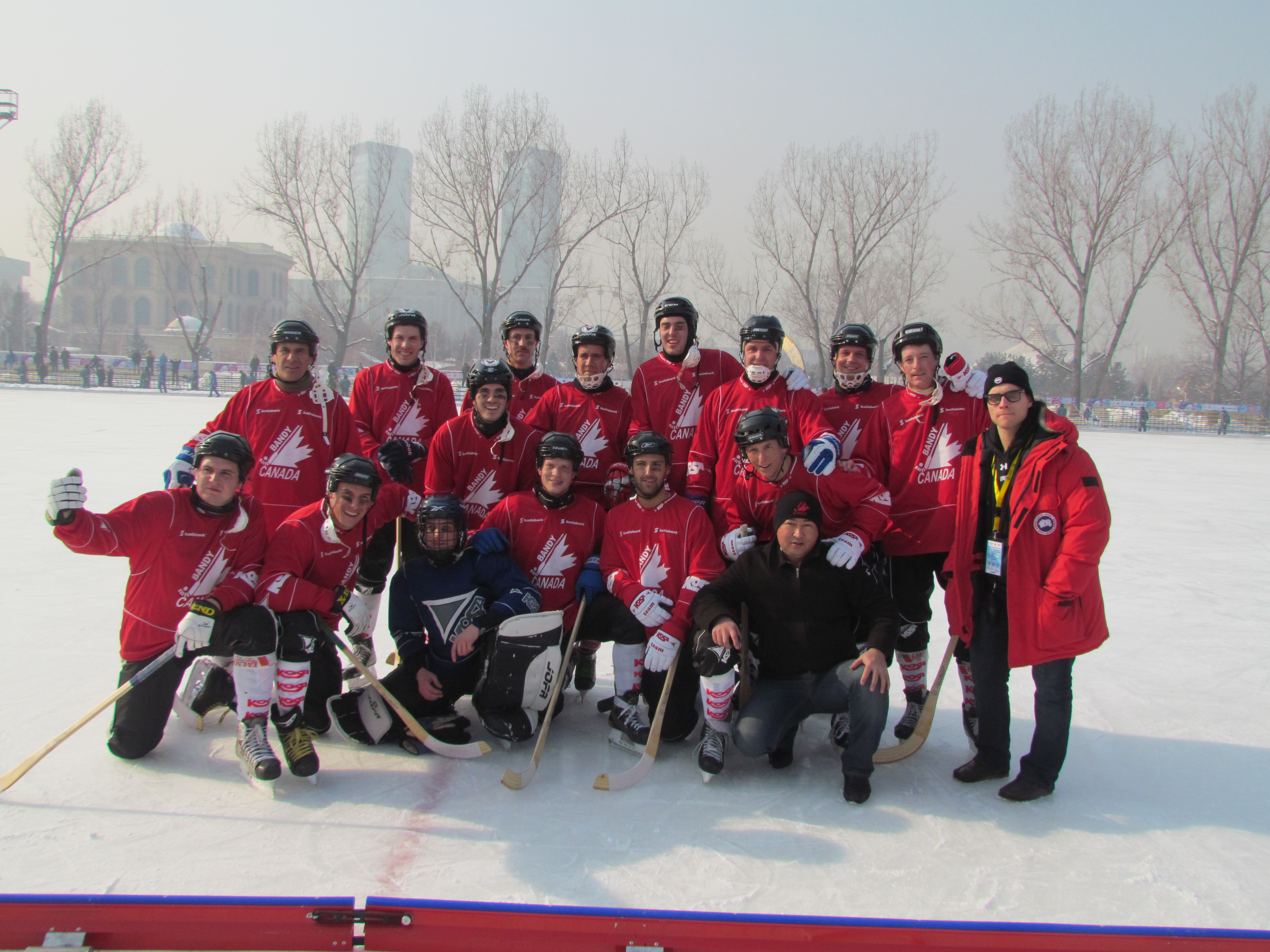
2012 Bandy World Championship

Almaty Central Stadium was built in 1958. It is a structure, oval in plan, divided into 4 inserts passages podium: the northern, western, southern and eastern. The total capacity of the stands is 23,804 seats. All places of individual seats, mounted on metal parts, provide convenience and form the shape viewer. The minimum height of the back – 38 cm Central stadium's lighting systems equipped (lights) to the possibility of holding events in the evening. Light level of 1400 lux.

For vehicles in the stadium there are two entrances – from the street. Satpayev and Abay. For the passage of the audience and engaged – 4 inputs with Abay, streets K. Satpaev, A. Baitursynov.

Since it opened it has been the home stadium of Kairat who first played there on 10 April 1960 Playing against Leningrad "Admiralty", a game which finished 0–0.

Almaty was the host of the 2012 Bandy World Championship. The Reserve rink of Central Stadium was built for the tournament. The matches in Group B and C was played there, except for the match for 13th place, which was played at the main Medeu arena. Afterwards the installation for making artificial ice was dismantled.

== Stadium building ==
A memorial plaque to mountaineer and climber Anatoli Boukreev (1958-1997), who died during the ascent of the 12th eight-thousand-meter peak Anapurna, is installed on the east wall of the stadium. The stadium also hosts skating competitions. In the early years, ice was prepared and skating competitions were held. In 1964, seven all-university and two world records were set.

=== Status of the monument ===
On February 19, 1987, the Executive Committee of the Alma-Ata City Council of People's Deputies decided to include the stadium in the list of architectural and urban monuments of local importance in Alma-Ata. The decision provided for the registration of a protection obligation and the development of restoration projects for monuments. On November 10, 2010, a new state list of historical and cultural monuments of local importance for the city of Almaty was adopted. At the same time, all previous resolutions on this issue were declared invalid. In this decree, the status of the Central Stadium as a monument of local importance was maintained. The boundaries of the protected zones were approved in 2014.

== USSR ==
During the times of the USSR, the stadium was state-owned. With the collapse of the USSR it was transferred to the municipal state administration of the Almaty city akimat (CGP Central Stadium). In May 2014 the approval of the Comprehensive Privatization Plan for 2014-2016 was announced, according to which the "State Municipal Enterprise Central Stadium" will be sold into private ownership.

== Championships ==
- USSR Football Championship (1960–1990)
- USSR Championship in Athletics Disciplines (1965)
- Kazakhstan Premier League (1991–present)
- Traditional annual international athletics tournament "Gusman Kosanov Memorial" (1991–present).

== Adjacent facilities ==
Near the stadium there is a complex of mini-football fields, small arena and stadium.

== Sections and organizations in the stadium ==
The stadium is surrounded by a ring, inside of which a hotel is located.

- Federation of Sports Orienteering of the Republic of Kazakhstan
- Alma-Ata Marathon Club
- Boxing Section
- Wrestling Section
- Mini Field

The central stadium devotes a lot of time and attention to the elderly, and there is a health group for the elderly. Many pensioners of the city have the opportunity to visit this health and fitness section for free. Classes are held in a universal gym equipped with a Swedish wall and gymnastic mats. The arena provides time for deaf and hard of hearing athletes, as well as for children with disabilities from Special Olympics. Athletes have the opportunity to play football, volleyball, basketball and athletics.
