= Qodir Zokirov =

Uzbekistani-Soviet scientist (1906–1992)

Qodir Zokirovich Zokirov
- Born: 25 July 1906; Jalolobod, Andijon, Ferghana Valley
- Died: 9 August 1992 (aged 86); Tashkent, Uzbekistan
- Education: Tashkent State University of Pedagogy
- Known for: Classification of Central Asian flora
- Awards: Order of Biruni (1968)
- Scientific career
- Fields: Botany; Pedagogy
- Workplaces: Central Asian University; Tashkent State University of Pedagogy; Institute of Botany of Uzbekistan

Qodir Zokirovich Zokirov (July 25, 1906 – August 9, 1992) was a Soviet and Uzbek scientist, botanist, educator and a member of Supreme Soviet of the Soviet Union.

== Biography ==
Zokirov was born on July 25, 1906, in Jalolobod, Ferghana to the handicraftsman's family. In 1920 he entered a Soviet youth organization, and joined a Likbez campaign.

In 1932 Zokirov graduated from the Pedagogy Academy. In 1937-1941 he worked at the Central Asian University, where in 1937 he was appointed as an assistant professor and acting head of the department of botany of Samarkand State University. From 1943 to 1952 he was the head of botany department of the Tashkent State University of Pedagogy. In 1952 he was appointed as Director of the Institute of Botany. He also served as a member of Supreme Soviet of the Soviet Union (1959–1963).

Zokirov died on August 9, 1992, in Tashkent, aged 86.
