= Terekty, Karasay District, Almaty Region =

Terekty Теректі
- Village
- Location in Kazakhstan
- Coordinates: 43°14′37″N 76°47′35″E
- Country: Kazakhstan
- Region: Almaty Region
- District: Karasay District

Population (2009)
  - Total: 2,193
- Time zone: UTC+6 (Omsk Time)

Terekty, (Kazakh: Теректі, Terektı), formerly Oktyabr, is a village in Karasay District of Almaty Region, in south-eastern Kazakhstan.
