= Suleyman Demirel University =

University in Kazakhstan

Coordinates: 43.2080°N 76.6700°E

SDU University
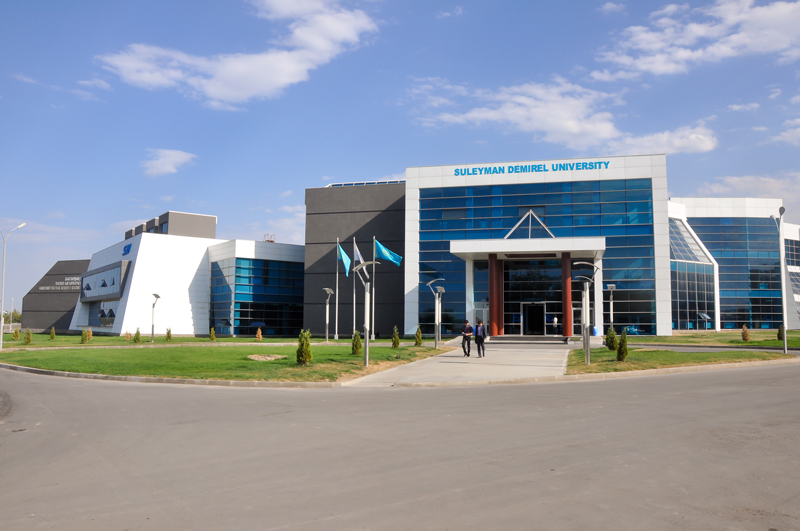
- Other name: SDU
- Type: Private
- Established: 17 December 1996; 29 years ago
- Rector: Arman Zhumazhanov
- Location: Kaskelen, Karasay District, Almaty, Kazakhstan
- Website: www.sdu.edu.kz

University rankings

Regional – Overall
- QS Emerging Europe and Central Asia: 351-400 (2022)

SDU University is an international and private university in Kaskelen, Almaty, Kazakhstan. It is named after Süleyman Demirel, the former prime minister and president of Turkey.

The university was established in 1996, by the initiatives of the former president of Kazakhstan, Nursultan Nazarbayev, and the former president of Turkey, Süleyman Demirel.

== Education ==
As of November 2024, SDU offers 61 educational programs, including: - 29 undergraduate programs, - 24 master's programs, - 8 doctoral programs.

The university has a trilingual education system (English Medium Instruction based), according to which 70% of educational programs are taught in English and 30% are available in English, Kazakh or Russian. Training is conducted according to the ECTS system (European Credit Transfer and Accumulation System). The university boasts 8,500 students, including students from Central Asia, China, Russia, Mongolia, Indonesia. The university collaborates with 70 universities globally, under the Erasmus program and other academic mobility and student's exchange programs

== Faculties ==
=== Business School ===
https://sdu.edu.kz/language/en/business-school/

=== Faculty of Engineering and Natural Sciences ===
https://sdu.edu.kz/en/engineering-and-natural-sciences/

=== Faculty of Education and Humanities ===
https://sdu.edu.kz/language/en/education-and-humanities/

=== Faculty of Law and Social Sciences ===
https://sdu.edu.kz/language/en/law-social-science/

=== Multidisciplinary Education ===
https://sdu.edu.kz/language/en/center-of-multidisciplinary-eduation/

=== SDU Extension School ===
https://sdu.edu.kz/language/en/ses/
