= Sanjar Boqaev =

Kazakh politician

- Санжар Боқаев
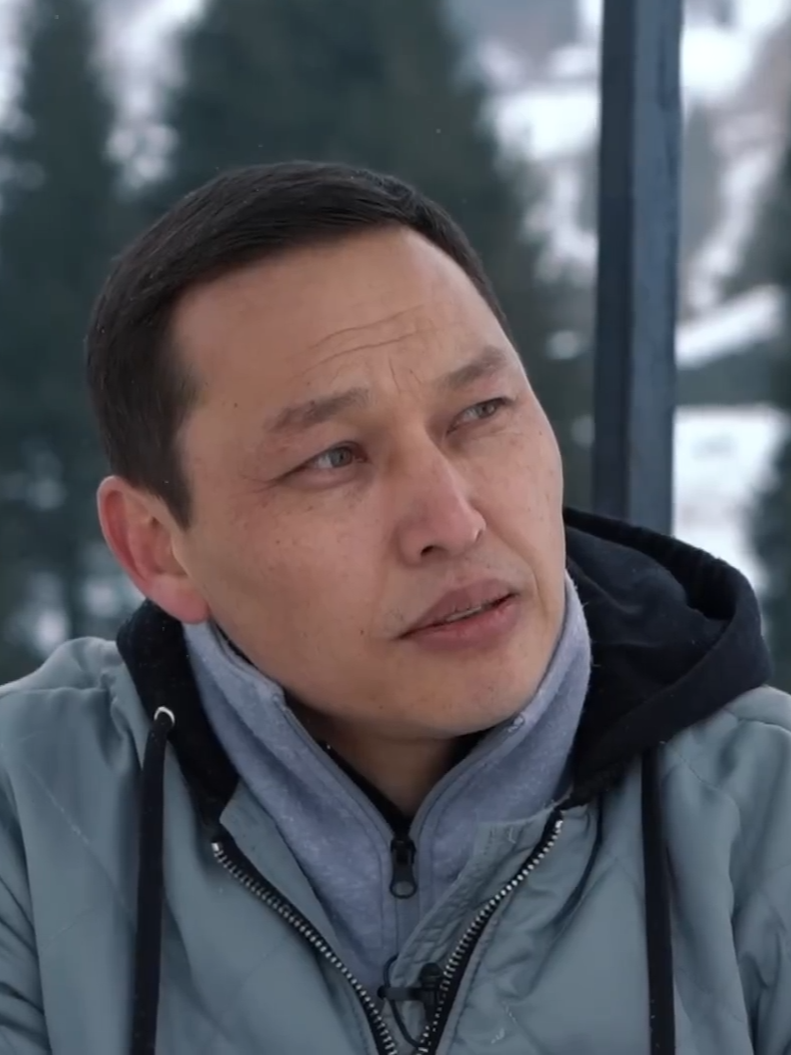
- Sanjar Boqaev in 2022

Leader of Namys
- Incumbent
- Assumed office 18 February 2022
- Preceded by: Office established

Personal details
- Born: 2 March 1982 (age 44) Alma-Ata, Kazakh SSR, Soviet Union
- Party: Namys (2022–present)
- Other political affiliations: Nur Otan (until 2020)
- Education: Al-Farabi Kazakh National University; Moscow State University; Russian Presidential Academy of National Economy and Public Administration; Columbia University
- Awards: For the Development of Civil Society

Sanjar Omarūly Boqaev (Note: Often transliterated as Sanzhar Omarovich Bokayev through a Russified Romanization of Санжар Омарович Бокаев.) (Kazakh: Санжар Омарұлы Боқаев; born 2 March 1982) is a Kazakh politician, political scientist, and public figure who is the leader of the unregistered political party Namys, founder of the public movement #NETUTILISBORU, and a recipient of awards for contributions to civil society development.

== Biography ==
=== Early life and career ===
Boqaev was born in Alma-Ata (now Almaty). He graduated from the Faculty of History of Al-Farabi Kazakh National University in 2003. In 2005, he completed a second degree at the university's Faculty of Political Science, specializing in political institutions and processes.

From 2006 to 2009, Bokayev pursued doctoral studies at the Faculty of Political Science of Al-Farabi Kazakh National University. During this period, he completed academic internships at Lomonosov Moscow State University, the Russian Presidential Academy of National Economy and Public Administration, and Columbia University in the United States.

Between 2009 and 2010, he worked as a senior lecturer at the Department of Political Science of Al-Farabi Kazakh National University. From 2010 to 2011, he served as a senior researcher at the Kazakhstan Institute for Strategic Studies under the President of the Republic of Kazakhstan.

From 2012 to 2014, Boqaev headed the Department for Youth Policy of the Almaty City Akimat, and subsequently led the Department of Internal Policy. Between 2015 and 2018, he worked as an adviser to the chairman of the board of KazTransGas JSC and served as deputy chairman of the Almaty city branch of the Nur Otan party.

=== Social and political activities ===
In 2006, Boqaev emerged as one of the leaders of protests by owners of right-hand drive vehicles. The protests followed a government decree banning the import of such vehicles into Kazakhstan. The movement involved tens of thousands of vehicle owners and importers and ultimately contributed to the easing of restrictive measures.

Since 2019, Boqaev has led the #NETUTILSBORU public movement, which opposes mandatory vehicle recycling fees introduced in Kazakhstan in 2016. The movement criticized the structure of the fee system and the transfer of funds to a private operator. As a result of sustained public pressure, recycling fee rates for vehicles and agricultural machinery were reduced by approximately 50 percent.

In February 2022, Boqaev announced the creation of the Namys political party, positioning it as a digital-oriented political organization focused on youth participation and modern political engagement. Despite passing several legal stages, the party ultimately failed to obtain official registration after it did not gather the required members of the initiative group. Boqaev cited logistical difficulties, human factors, and organizational costs as the main reasons for this outcome.

==== 2023 legislative election ====
In January 2023, Boqaev announced his intention to run for the Mäjilis from Constituency No. 4 as an independent candidate, stating that participation via party lists had been effectively closed to his movement, that self-nomination remained a narrow legal avenue with high competition, and that he planned to support independent candidates in other districts based on sociological research, while emphasizing that a New Kazakhstan parliament must constitutionally hold the government accountable and respond to societal needs. Following this announcement, Boqaev publicly urged voters to support independent candidates in single-mandate constituency races.

In the official CEC results of the No.4 constituency, Boqaev won 15% (11,660) of the vote, losing the race to Erlan Stambekov who won 21% (15,930 votes). Boqaev disputed the outcome, citing copies of more than 100 polling station protocols which, he claimed, showed him leading in the vote count with 7,651 votes cast for him over Stambekov's 5,931 votes. He alleged that discrepancies arose from closed polling stations such as military units and hospitals and pointed to inconsistencies in individual precinct protocols as evidence of falsification. On 24 March 2023, the Judicial Board for Administrative Cases of the Almaty City Court dismissed Boqaev's appeal concerning alleged violations by election commissions in single-mandate Constituency No. 4, upholding the 20 March 2023 decision of the Inter-District Specialized Court of Almaty. On 23 May 2023, the Supreme Court rejected Boqaev's complaints over the election results on procedural grounds.

== Awards ==
- For the Development of Civil Society (7 December 2023)
