= Kazakhstan's 11th electoral district =

Electoral District in Kazakhstan

Electoral district No. 11
- Kazakh: №11 сайлау округі Russian: Избирательный округ №11
- Single-mandate constituency for the Mäjilis
- District: Enbekshikazakh, Kegen, Raiymbek, Talgar, and Uygur
- Region: Aktobe Region (2004–2007); Almaty Region (2022–present)
- Population: 916,671 (2023)
- Electorate: 472,572 (2023)
- Major settlements: Qonaev (seat)

Current constituency
- Created: 2004; 2022 (re-established)
- Seats: 1
- Party: Independent
- Deputy: Ardaq Nazarov
- Elected: 2023

The Electoral district No. 11 (Kazakh: №11 сайлау округі, romanized: №11 sailau okrugı; Russian: Избирательный округ №11) is a single-mandate territorial constituency in Kazakhstan, represented in the lower chamber Mäjilis of the Parliament. It is one of constituencies within the Almaty Region as its seat is centered in Qonaev, which includes the regional districts of Enbekshikazakh, Kegen, Raiymbek, Talgar, and Uygur.

The constituency was originally formed for the 2004 legislative election and existed until being abolished in 2007. However, it has been reestablished in 2022 and is currently represented by deputy Ardaq Nazarov (Independent) since March 2023.

== Geography ==
The Electoral district No. 11 is situated in the territory of Almaty Region which includes the districts of Enbekshikazakh, Kegen, Raiymbek, Talgar, and Uygur. Its administrative center, Qonaev, serves as the seat of the constituency. The constituency shares borders with No. 12 (Almaty Region), No. 4 (Almaty), and No. 5 (Almaty) to the west, and No. 17 (Jetisu Region) to the north.

== History ==
The Electoral district No. 11 was formed for the 2004 legislative election as a result of redistribution originally within the boundaries of Aktobe Region, and Maral Iteğulov served as deputy from the constituency. From there, the electoral district continued to exist until its dissolution following the 2007 constitutional amendment, which led to the abolition of all constituencies as part of the transition from a mixed-member majoritarian representation to a fully party-list proportional representation system. The change affected the composition of all seats in the lower chamber Mäjilis of the Kazakh Parliament beginning with the 2007 legislative election.

On 24 December 2022, the Electoral district No. 11 was reestablished by the Central Election Commission in the Almaty Region, which came into effect on 1 January 2023 as a result of the 2022 amendment. The adoption of this amendment marked the reintroduction of a mixed electoral system for electing Mäjilis deputies, with the use of numbered constituencies being reinstated for the first time since 2004. It made its debut in the 2023 legislative election, with Ardaq Nazarov becoming the elected representative of the constituency.

== Deputies ==
Election	Member	Party	%	Representing region
2004	Maral Iteğulov	Independent	52.0	Aqtöbe Region
2007	Defunct (Single-nationwide PR constituency)			
2012	Defunct (Single-nationwide PR constituency)			
2016	Defunct (Single-nationwide PR constituency)			
2021	Defunct (Single-nationwide PR constituency)			
2023	Ardaq Nazarov	Amanat	50.9	Almaty Region

== Election results ==
=== 2023 ===
Candidate	Party	Votes	%
Ardaq Nazarov	Independent	122,242	50.87
Rysbek Särsenbai	Independent (Bizdin Tandau)	43,565	18.13
Erik Äbitov	Amanat	14,638	6.09
Alğadai Äbilğazyuly	Independent	10,904	4.54
Aiman Tursynqan	Independent	8,520	3.55
Ğabit Ömirbekov	Independent	8,467	3.52
Nurlan Täjikenov	Independent	8,296	3.45
Abylai Baqytjan	Independent	7,497	3.12
Marat Muhametjanov	Independent	6,302	2.62
Against all		9,870	4.11
Total		240,301	100.00
Valid votes		240,301	96.92
Invalid/blank votes		7,629	3.08
Total votes		247,930	100.00
Registered voters/turnout		472,572	52.46
Independent gain			
Source: CEC
