= Meyirjan Otynşiev =

Kazakh politician

- Мейіржан Отыншиев

Secretary of the Almaty City Mäslihat
- Incumbent
- Assumed office 30 March 2023
- Preceded by: Stanislav Kankurov

Chairman of the Almaty City Branch of Amanat
- In office 26 January 2023 – 14 April 2023
- Preceded by: Erbolat Dosaev
- Succeeded by: Stanislav Kankurov

Member of the Almaty City Mäslihat
- Incumbent
- Assumed office 30 March 2023
- Constituency: Amanat party list (2023–present)

Personal details
- Born: 21 December 1987 (age 38) South Kazakhstan Region, Kazakh SSR, Soviet Union
- Party: Amanat (since 2022)
- Education: Al-Farabi Kazakh National University; Karaganda University of Kazpotrebsoyuz; Academy of Public Administration

Meiirjan Batyrbekūly Otynşiev (MAY-er-zhan OH-tin-shi-yev, Kazakh: Мейіржан Батырбекұлы Отыншиев, [mʲejɘrˈʐɑːn bɑtʰɯrˈbʲeko̙ɫɯ ʷotʰɯnˈʂɯjɯp]; born 21 December 1987) is a Kazakh politician who is serving as the chairman and member of the Almaty City Mäslihat since March 2023.

Otynşiev previously served as the Chairman of the Almaty City Branch of the ruling Amanat party from January to April 2023 and Executive Secretary of the same branch from 2022 to 2023.

== Biography ==
=== Early life and education ===
Born on 21 December 1987 in what is now the Turkistan Region, Otynşiev got a bachelor's degree in International law in the Al-Farabi Kazakh National University (2009) and another in Economics in the Karaganda University of Kazpotrebsoyuz (2011). He also got a master's degree in State and local government in the Academy of Public Administration under the President of Kazakhstan.

=== Career ===
Meyirjan Otynşiev started his career as Chief specialist in the Department of Employment and Social Programs of Almaty in 2010. Later, he was the chief specialist of the legal department, head of the internal control department of the Department of Employment and Social Programs of the city until May 2014.

After that, until early 2021, Otynşiev continued his career in different departments of the city of Almaty. On 20 January 2021, he was appointed as First Deputy of the Almaty city branch of the ruling Nur Otan party. In March 2022, he started his tenure as the Executive Secretary of the Almaty city branch of the Amanat party. During this period, he was a vocal supporter of Kassym-Jomart Tokayev's policies.

From February to April 2023, he was elected to head the branch as chairman, more than a 100 delegates voted for his candidacy.

As a result of a 2023 local Mäslihat election, he got to be elected as the chairman and member of the Almaty City Mäslihat. His candidacy was initially proposed by his predecessor and fellow Almaty local politician Stanislav Kankurov.

== Awards and decorations ==
Otynsiev has been awarded the Medal for Distinguished Labor, Medal "For 30 years of Kazakhstan's independence" and the Amanat party's "For active service" badge.
