= 2023 Almaty City Mäslihat election =

2023 election of a local Almaty, Kazakhstan legislature

← 2021	19 March 2023	2028 →

All 42 seats in the Almaty City Mäslihat 22 seats needed for a majority
- Turnout: 25.15% (▼5.00pp)
	First party	Second party	Third party
	AMANAT	QHP	Respublica
Leader	Meyirjan Otynşiev	Nursultan Şoqanov	Raiymbek Suñğat
Party	Amanat	QHP	Respublica
Leader since	26 January 2023	20 December 2022	27 January 2023
Last election	29 seats, 68.11%	3 seats, 7.31%	New
Seats won	25	3	5
Seat change	▼4	Steady	New
Popular vote	151,531	38,563	38,369
Percentage	51.94% (PR)	13.22% (PR)	13.15% (PR)
Swing	▼16.17pp	▲5.91pp	New
	Fourth party	Fifth party	Sixth party
	Baytaq	Aq Jol	Auyl
Leader	Beibit Äpsenbetov	Oljas Nuraldinov	Aibyn Törehanov
Party	Baytaq	Aq Jol	Auyl
Leader since	January 2023	30 August 2021	18 December 2022
Last election	New	4 seats, 10.11%	3 seats, 7.68%
Seats won	3	2	0
Seat change	New	▼2	▼3
Popular vote	23,266	15,273	8,264
Percentage	7.97% (PR)	5.23% (PR)	2.83% (PR)
Swing	New	▼4.88pp	▼4.85pp
- Results in the electoral districts
Secretary before election
Stanislav Kankurov
Amanat
Elected Secretary
Meyirjan Otynşiev
Amanat

Elections to the Almaty City Mäslihat were held on 19 March 2023 to elect 42 deputies to the 8th convocation of the Almaty City Mäslihat. It coincided with the 2023 local elections. For the first time, a mixed electoral system was used, with half of the seats filled through single-member districts and the other half through party-list proportional representation.

In the party-list contest, the ruling Amanat party secured a majority, winning 12 out of 21 seats. The party also dominated the constituency seats, further consolidating its majority control. Notably, independents were elected for the first time since 2016, following the restoration of the mixed electoral system in the 2022 referendum. Other parties that gained representation, listed in descending order of seats, include Respublica, the People's Party, Baytaq, and Aq Jol.

== Background ==
As a result of the 2021 Almaty City Mäslihat election, the ruling Nur Otan (now known as Amanat) got the majority of seats in the Mäslihat. From there, Stanislav Kankurov, the first deputy chairman of the Nur Otan party in Almaty, was subsequently elected as the mäslihat's new secretary for the first time since 2014 during its opening session of the 7th convocation.

Before this election, the deputies used to be directly-elected through proportional representation for a five-year term, with a 7% electoral threshold. In the aftermath of the 2022 Kazakh unrest, President Kassym-Jomart Tokayev in his March 2022 State of the Nation Address unveiled a series of reforms, including the changing of the electoral system of all mäslihats into a mixed one.

Following a constitutional referendum in a September 2022 State of the Nation Address, Tokayev announced a snap local elections for mäslihat deputies to take place in the first half of 2023 in parr with the Mäjilis election.

== Electoral system ==
Since Tokayev's March 2022 Presidential Address to the Nation, the members are elected through a mixed electoral system, in which half of the seats are elected from single-member districts and party-list proportional representation, respectively.

== Parties ==
Six parties submitted their party lists to the Territorial Electoral Commission of Almaty, and they were registered on 18 February 2023.

Name		Branch leader	No. 1 on party list	2021 result	
Name		Branch leader	No. 1 on party list	Votes (%)	Seats
Amanat	Amanat	Meyirjan Otynşiev	Zhansaya Abdumalik	68.1%	29 / 39
Auyl	"Auyl" People's Democratic Patriotic Party «Аuyl» Halyqtyq-Demokratialyq Patriottyq Partiasy	Aibyn Törehanov	Ämirhan Smaiyluly	7.7%	3 / 39
Respublica	Respublica	Raiymbek Suñğat	Hamit Bahatbek	New	
QHP	People's Party of Kazakhstan Qazaqstan Halyq Partiasy	Nursultan Şoqanov	Gülnara Abrahmatova	7.3%	3 / 39
Baytaq	"Baytaq" Green Party of Kazakhstan Qazaqstannyñ «Baytaq» jasyldar partiasy	Beibit Äpsenbetov	Beibit Äpsenbetov	New	
Aq Jol	Aq Jol Democratic Party Aq Jol Demokratialyq Partiasy	Oljas Nuraldinov	Oljas Nuraldinov	10.1%	4 / 39

== Results ==
Party	Party-list			Constituency			Total seats	+/–
Party	Votes	%	Seats	Votes	%	Seats	Total seats	+/–
Amanat	151,531	51.94	12			13	25	–4
People's Party	38,563	13.22	3			0	3	0
Respublica	38,369	13.15	3			2	5	New
Baytaq	23,266	7.97	2			1	3	New
Aq Jol	15,273	5.23	1			1	2	–2
Auyl	8,264	2.83	0			0	0	–3
Independents						4	4	New
Against all	16,490	5.65	–	19,269	100.00	–	–	–
Total	291,756	100.00	21	19,269	100.00	21	42	+3
Valid votes	291,756	96.52						
Invalid/blank votes	10,514	3.48						
Total votes	302,270	100.00		286,820	–			
Registered voters/turnout	1,202,078	25.15		1,202,078	23.86			
Source: TEC TEC bes.media

Popular vote
Amanat	51.94%
QHP	13.22%
Respublica	13.15%
Baytaq	7.97%
Aq Jol	5.23%
Auyl	2.83%

Mäslihat seats
Amanat	59.52%
Respublica	11.90%
Independents	9.52%
QHP	7.14%
Baytaq	7.17%
Aq Jol	4.76%

== See also ==
- 2023 Kazakh legislative election
- 2023 Kazakh local elections
