= Baqytjan Bazarbek =

Kazakh politician

MP Baqytjan Bazarbek
- Бақытжан Базарбек
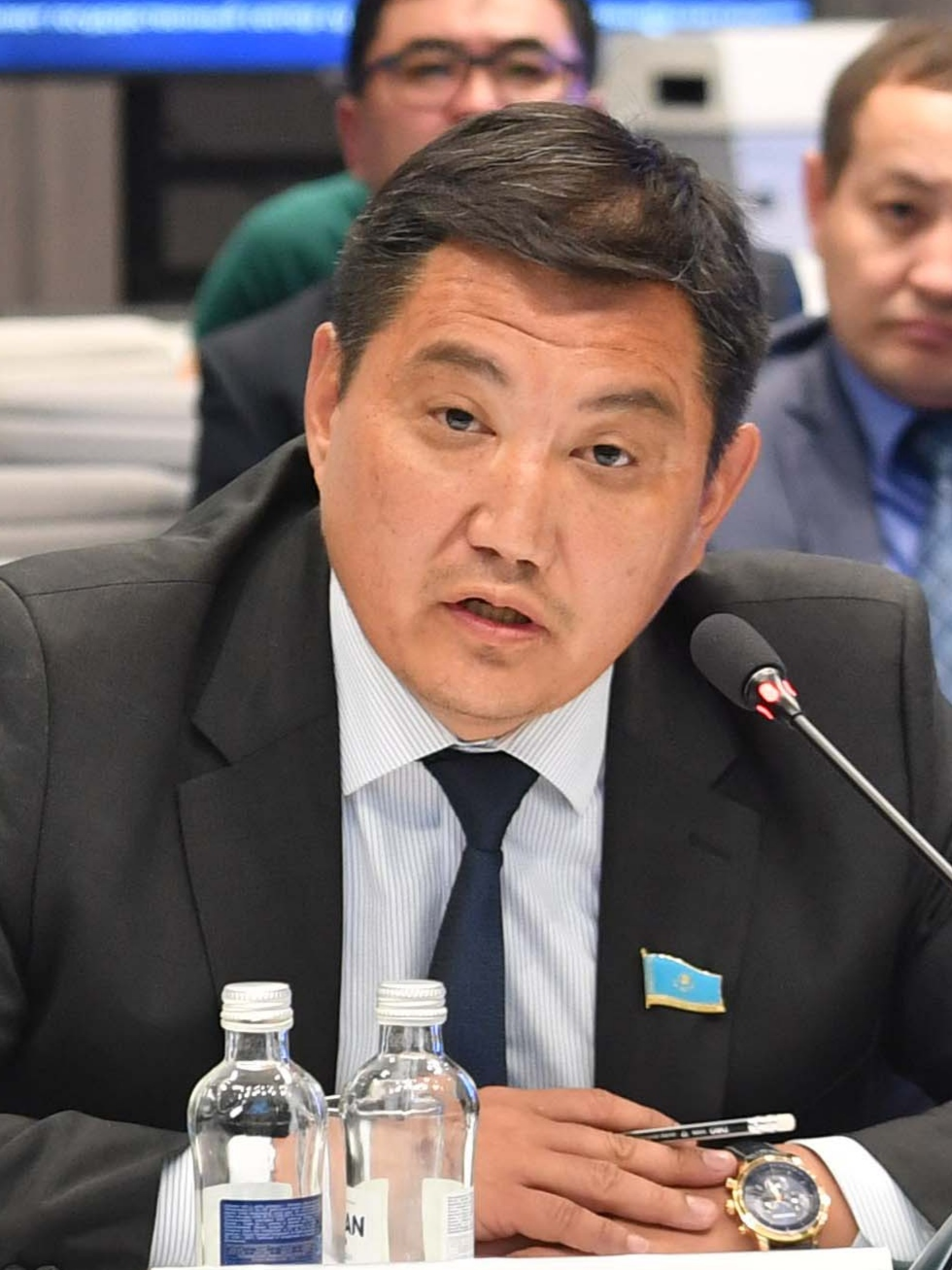
- Bazarbek in 2023

Member of the Mäjilis
- In office 29 March 2023 – 1 July 2026
- Succeeded by: Turarbek Asanov (2004)
- Constituency: 5th electoral district

Personal details
- Born: 4 June 1981 (age 45) Dzhambul, Dzhambul Oblast, Kazakh SSR, Soviet Union
- Party: DPA (2012)
- Spouse: Adel Ädılova
- Children: 2
- Education: Maqsut Narikbayev University; Moscow International Higher Business School MIRBIS

Baqytjan Jūmabekūly Bazarbek (Note: Often transliterated as Bakytzhan Zhumabekuly Bazarbek through a Russified Romanization of Бакытжан Жумабекулы Базарбек.) (Kazakh: Бақытжан Жұмабекұлы Базарбек; born 4 June 1981) is a Kazakh politician and jurist, who has been serving as Member of the Mäjilis since March 2023.

Elected as MP from Kazakhstan's 5th electoral district, he later became member of the Mäjilis Committee on Legislation and Judicial and Legal Reform.

== Early life and education ==
Bazarbek was born on 4 June 1981 in Dzhambul, Soviet Kazakhstan. As a child, he attended the Töle Bi school No. 8.

From 1998, Bazarbek studied law at Maqsut Narikbayev University (KAZGUU) in Almaty, finishing it in 2002. From 2011 to 2013, he attended MIRBIS in Moscow, receiving a master's degree of executive administration.

== Entrepreneurial and educational career ==
Bazarbek began his career in 2002 at L. N. Gumilev Eurasian National University. He served as teacher there until 2004, becoming deputy director of its Law Institute.

From March to September 2004, he led the Administrative-Judicial Department of the National Testing Center of the Ministry of Education and Science.

From 2004 to 2015, Bazarbek was a senior educator at KAZGUU. During these years, he was employed by different private companies, focusing on the environment and transport.

Between 2015 and 2016, he was a senior educator at Turan University. Afterwards, until 27 March 2023, he held leadership position at different companies, including leading the Almaty branch of the Kazakhstan Lawyers' Union.

At various times, Bazarbek worked alongside the Almaty akimat, the Parliament of Kazakhstan, the Energy and National Economy Ministries, the Atameken National Chamber of Entrepreneurs, and the Government of Kazakhstan.

== Political career ==
=== Electoral campaigns ===
Bazarbek ran for Mäjilis membership during the 2012 Kazakh legislative election from the Democratic Party Adilet, but lost the bid.

He ran another campaign for Parliament during the 2023 Kazakh legislative election to represent Kazakhstan's 5th electoral district, and won, starting his tenure on 29 March 2023.

=== Mäjilis membership ===
As Member of Parliament, Bazarbek has been vocal about the crime, water, land, and corruption problems.

Bazarbek has supported Kassym-Jomart Tokayev's "Fair Kazakhstan" initiative.

== Awards and honors ==
Among Bazarbek's awards and honors are:

- Order of Kurmet

== Personal life ==
Bazarbek is married to Anel Ädılova, and they have two children. Bazarbek speaks Kazakh, Russian, and English.
