= Kazakhstan's 17th electoral district =

Single-mandate territorial constituency in Kazakhstan

Electoral district No. 17
- Kazakh: №17 сайлау округі Russian: Избирательный округ №17
- Single-mandate constituency for the Mäjilis
- Region: Almaty Region (2004–2007); Jetisu Region (2022–present)
- Population: 698,862 (2023)
- Electorate: 443,617 (2023)
- Major settlements: Taldyqorgan (seat)

Current constituency
- Created: 2004; 2022 (re-established)
- Seats: 1
- Party: Amanat
- Deputy: Ruslan Qojasbaev
- Elected: 2023

The Electoral district No. 17 (Kazakh: №17 сайлау округі, romanized: №17 sailau okrugı; Russian: Избирательный округ №17) is a single-mandate territorial constituency in Kazakhstan, represented in the lower chamber Mäjilis of the Parliament. It covers the entirety of Jetisu Region, including all its regional districts, with its seat being centered in Taldyqorgan.

The constituency was originally formed for the 2004 legislative election and existed until being abolished in 2007. However, it has been reestablished in 2022 and is currently represented by deputy Ruslan Qojasbaev (Amanat) since March 2023.

== Geography ==
The Electoral district No. 17 situated in the territory of Jetisu Region, and its administrative center, Taldyqorgan, serves as the seat of the constituency. The electoral district shares borders with No. 8 (Abai Region) to the north, No. 19 (Karaganda Region) to the northwest, No. 12 (Almaty Region) to the west, and No. 11 (Almaty Region) to the south.

== History ==
The Electoral district No. 17 was formed for the 2004 legislative election as a result of redistribution originally within the boundaries of Almaty Region, and Dinar Nüketaeva served as deputy from the constituency. From there, the electoral district continued to exist until its dissolution following the 2007 amendment, which led to the abolition of all constituencies as part of the transition from a mixed-member majoritarian representation to a fully party-list proportional representation system. The change affected the composition of all seats in the lower chamber Mäjilis of the Kazakh Parliament beginning with the 2007 legislative election.

On 24 December 2022, the Electoral district No. 17 was reestablished by the Central Election Commission in the territory of Jetisu Region, which came into effect on 1 January 2023 as a result of the 2022 amendment. The adoption of this amendment marked the reintroduction of a mixed electoral system for electing Mäjilis deputies, with the use of numbered constituencies being reinstated for the first time since 2004. It made its debut in the 2023 legislative election, with Ruslan Qojasbaev becoming the elected representative of the constituency.

== Deputies ==
Election	Member	Party	%	Representing region
2004	Dinar Nüketaeva	Otan	76.4	Almaty Region
2007	Defunct (Single-nationwide PR constituency)			
2012	Defunct (Single-nationwide PR constituency)			
2016	Defunct (Single-nationwide PR constituency)			
2021	Defunct (Single-nationwide PR constituency)			
2023	Ruslan Qojasbaev	Amanat	55.8	Jetisu Region

== Election results ==
=== 2023 ===
Candidate	Party	Votes	%
Ruslan Qojasbaev	Amanat	132,678	55.81
Saiat Nüsipov	Independent	18,135	7.63
Sanduğaş Düisenova	Independent	17,700	7.45
Auyt Muqibek	Independent	15,898	6.69
Arman Slämjanuly	Independent	9,067	3.81
Bolat Aitbaev	Independent	7,620	3.21
Ardaq Murynbaev	Independent	5,348	2.25
Qajet Andas	Independent	5,314	2.24
Maqsat Halyqov	Independent	3,468	1.46
Edil Qazaqpaev	Independent	3,258	1.37
Others		8,861	3.73
Against all		10,382	4.37
Total		237,729	100.00
Valid votes		237,729	96.95
Invalid/blank votes		7,475	3.05
Total votes		245,204	100.00
Registered voters/turnout		443,617	55.27
Amanat gain			
Source: CEC
