= Medeu District =

Coordinates: 43°15′N 76°57′E

Medeu District Медеу ауданы
- Almaty District
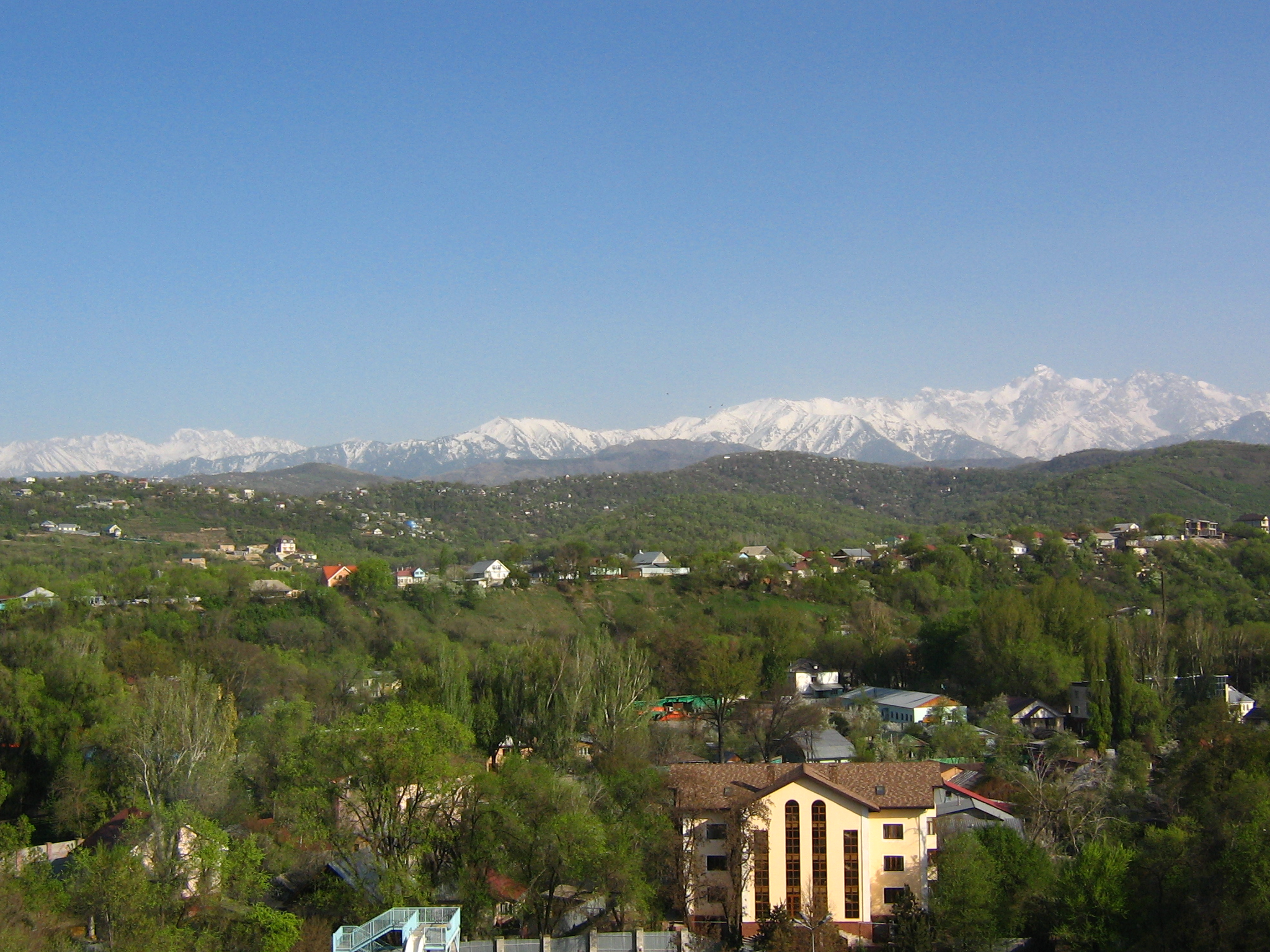
- Birds eye view of Medeu District

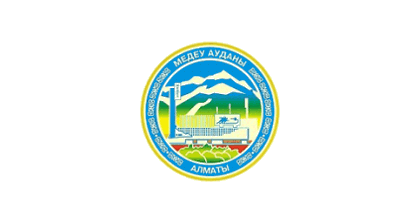
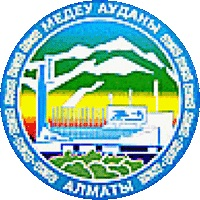
- Flag Seal
- Interactive map of Medeu District
- Country: Kazakhstan
- Region: Almaty
- Established: 14 September 1936

Government
  - Akim: Orazalin Yerkebulan Nurlanovich

Population (2019)
  - Total: 209,836
- Time zone: UTC+6 (UTC+6)

Medeu District (Kazakh: Медеу ауданы) is an administrative subdivision of the city of Almaty, Kazakhstan. It is considered one of the "elite" districts of the city.

== History ==
The first borders of the city of Almaty (then Verniy) passed within the Medeu District. The district was originally established on 14 September 1936 as Frunze District. It is named after Medeu Pusurmanov (1850-1908), a prominent 19th-century local landowner, entrepreneur, and patron who developed the area's foothills

On 12 December 1995, by the decision of the 1st Convocation of the Almaty City Mäslihat and the akim of the city, Frunze District was renamed into Medeu District. The name comes from the tract, which is located on the territory of the district which was assigned to the tract in 1920 with the light hand of the commissar and writer Dmitry Furmanov. It was he who gave the order to open the first recreation area in the tract. There is an assumption that Furmanov had in mind the houses of the city dweller Medeu Pusurmanov, which were located in the tract.
