= Kaskelen =

Kaskelen Қаскелең
- Town
- Location in Kazakhstan
- Coordinates: 43°12′0″N 76°37′12″E
- Country: Kazakhstan
- Region: Almaty Region
- District: Karasay District

Population (2021 (census))
  - Total: 79,482
- Time zone: UTC+6 (Omsk Time)
- Postal code: 040900
- Area code: 72740

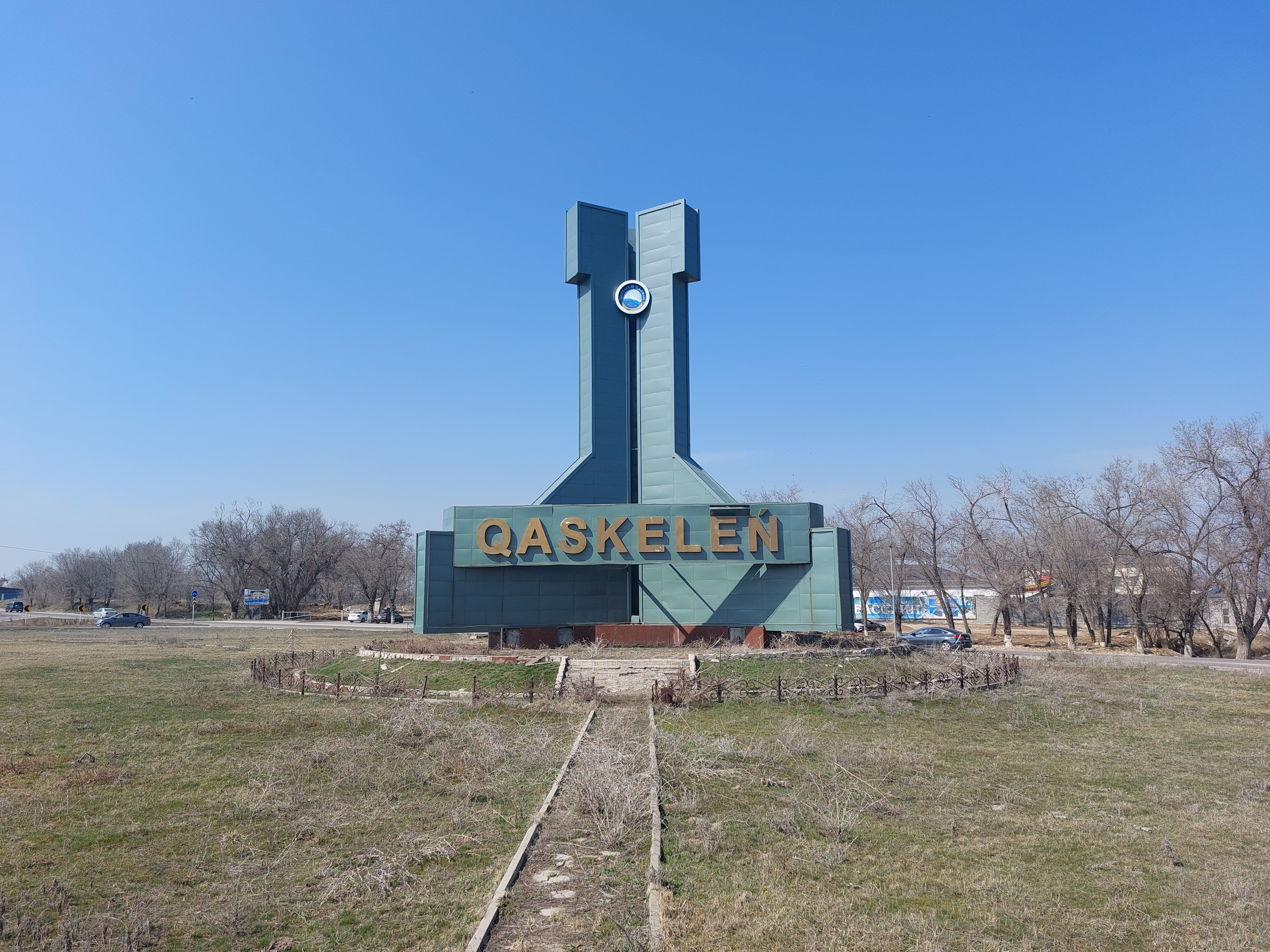
Kaskelen pointer

Kaskelen (Kazakh: Қаскелең, Qaskeleñ) is a town and seat of Karasay District in Almaty Region of south-eastern Kazakhstan. Population: 58,418 (2009 census results); 37,221 (1999 census results).

The city contains Suleyman Demirel University.
