= Turksib District =

Coordinates: 43°21′N 76°59′E

Turksib District Түрксіб ауданы
- City District
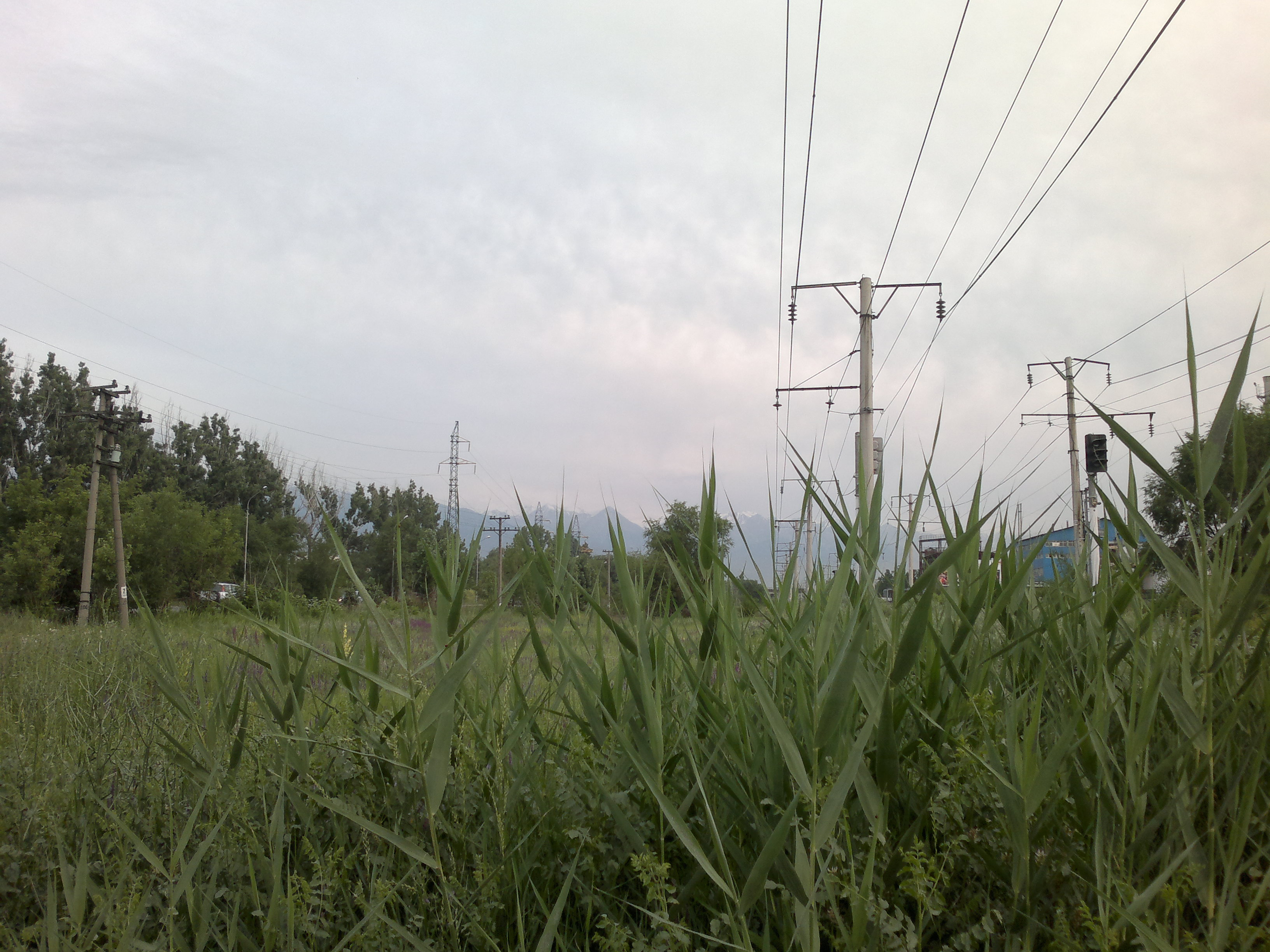

- Seal

- Country: Kazakhstan
- Region: Almaty
- Established: 19 April 1938

Government
  - Akim: Akzharov Bakhytzhan Kozhenberdyuly

Population (2019)
  - Total: 235,357
- Time zone: UTC+6 (UTC+6)

The Turksib District (Kazakh: Түрксіб ауданы) is an administrative subdivision of the city of Almaty. The district is an industrial area, with an air and railway gateway to the city.

== History ==
On 8 April 1938, a decision was made at a meeting of the Bureau of the Central Committee of the Communist Party of Kazakhstan "on the organization of a new Kaganovich District." On 19 April 1938, at the presidium of the City Council, the territorial boundaries of the district were established and the Kaganovich District was organized with the center at the Almaty-1 station. In July 1957, the district was renamed to Oktyabrsk.

On 12 December 1995, in connection with the celebration of the Independence Day of the Republic of Kazakhstan and the upcoming 70th anniversary of the construction of the Turkestan-Siberia Railway, the district was renamed into Turksib.
