= Central Asian University =

Private university in Tashkent, Uzbekistan

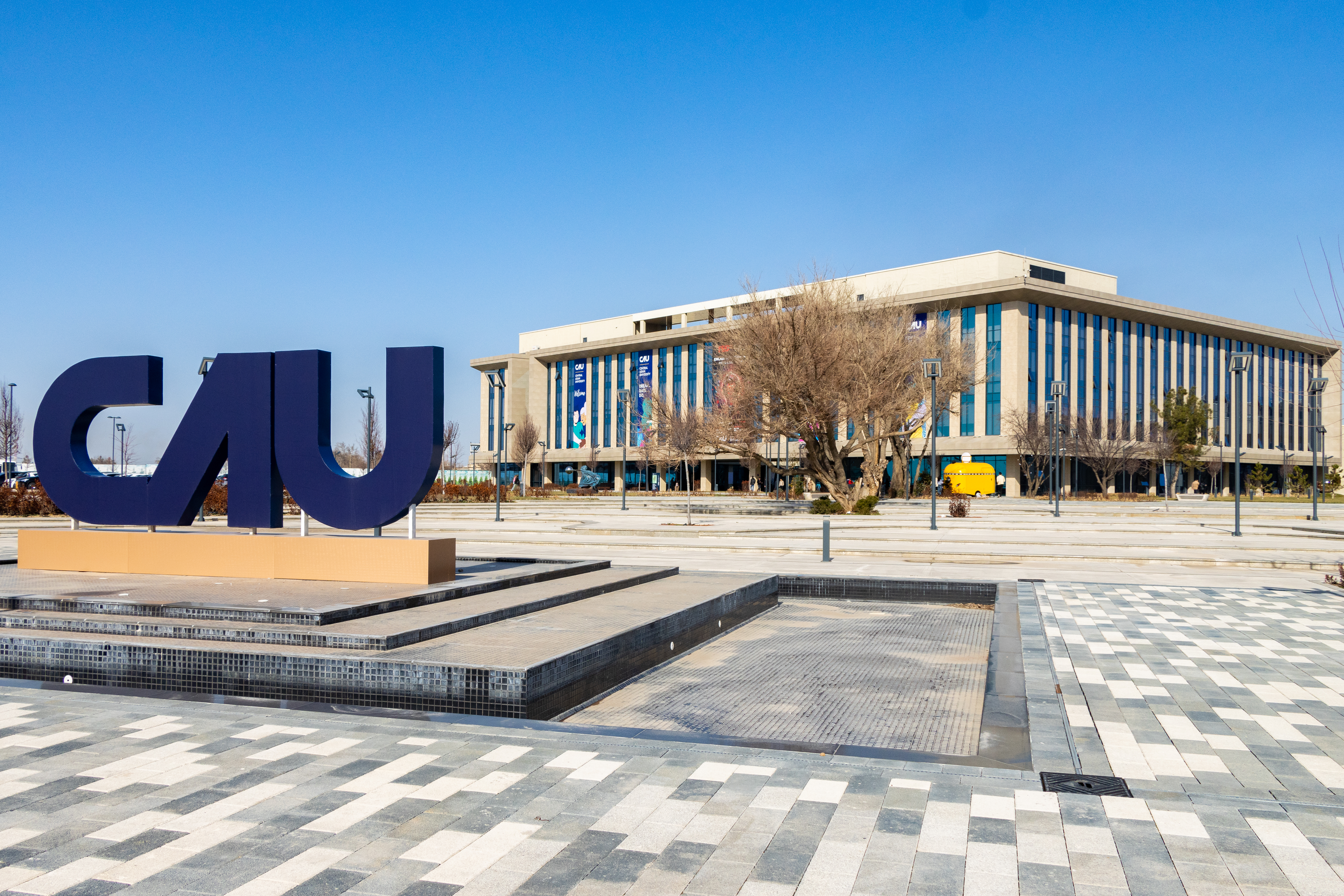
- Former name: Akfa University
- Type: Private university
- Established: 2019
- Founders: AKFA Group; AKFA Medline
- Affiliations: Erasmus+
- President: Kamran Gulamov
- Academic staff: 215
- Students: 2,200+
- Location: Tashkent, Uzbekistan
- Campus: Urban
- Language: English
- Website: https://centralasian.uz/

Central Asian University (CAU) is a private university located in Tashkent, Uzbekistan. It was established in 2019 and provides undergraduate, postgraduate, and medical education programs. Instruction is primarily conducted in English.

== History ==
Central Asian University was founded in 2019 pursuant to Resolution No. 130 of the Cabinet of Ministers of the Republic of Uzbekistan dated 15 February 2019. The institution was originally established under the name ''Akfa University'' by AKFA Group and AKFA Medline.

The first academic intake included approximately 200 students enrolled in medical programs. In 2020, the university introduced degree programs in business-related fields. Additional academic units, including engineering and education-related programs, were added in 2021.

In 2022, student enrollment increased, with more than 1,400 newly admitted students. On 26 June 2023, the institution officially changed its name to ''Central Asian University''.

In 2024, the university held its first graduation ceremony. During the same year, it entered into an academic partnership with the Hotel and Tourism Management Institute (HTMi), Switzerland, under which double-degree programs in hospitality and tourism management were introduced.

A Board of Trustees governs the university. Kamran Gulamov has served as president since February 2023.

== Academics and research ==
Central Asian University offers pre-foundation programs, undergraduate and postgraduate degrees, medical education, and residency training. Instruction is delivered primarily in English. The academic structure comprises six schools: Engineering, Architecture and Design; Medicine; Dentistry; Business; and Hospitality Management and Tourism. Medical education and residency training are conducted in cooperation with AKFA Medline University Hospital.

Research activities are conducted through institutional research units, including the CAU Research Lab. The university publishes the ''CAU Journal of Applied Research''.

== Campus and student life ==
Central Asian University operates a centralized campus in Tashkent that includes academic buildings, laboratories, libraries, student residences, and sports facilities. The university is implementing a campus expansion project that includes the construction of additional academic and laboratory facilities.

As of 2025, the university enrolls more than 2,200 students and employs over 500 staff members, including academic and administrative personnel. On-campus housing and student support services are available for domestic and international students.

== Global recognition and partnerships ==
Central Asian University has been included in several international ranking systems. In 2025, it was ranked 975 globally in the Round University Ranking, listed in the 1501+ band of the Times Higher Education Impact Rankings, and received a 4 Stars rating in the QS Stars system.

The university participates in the Erasmus+ programme and European Union–funded capacity-building projects. In 2025, it entered into a cooperation agreement with the Cleveland Clinic related to the development of a university hospital in Uzbekistan.
