= Karasay District =

Coordinates: 43.1994°N 76.6215°E

Karasay
- District
- Qarasay awdanı
- Seal

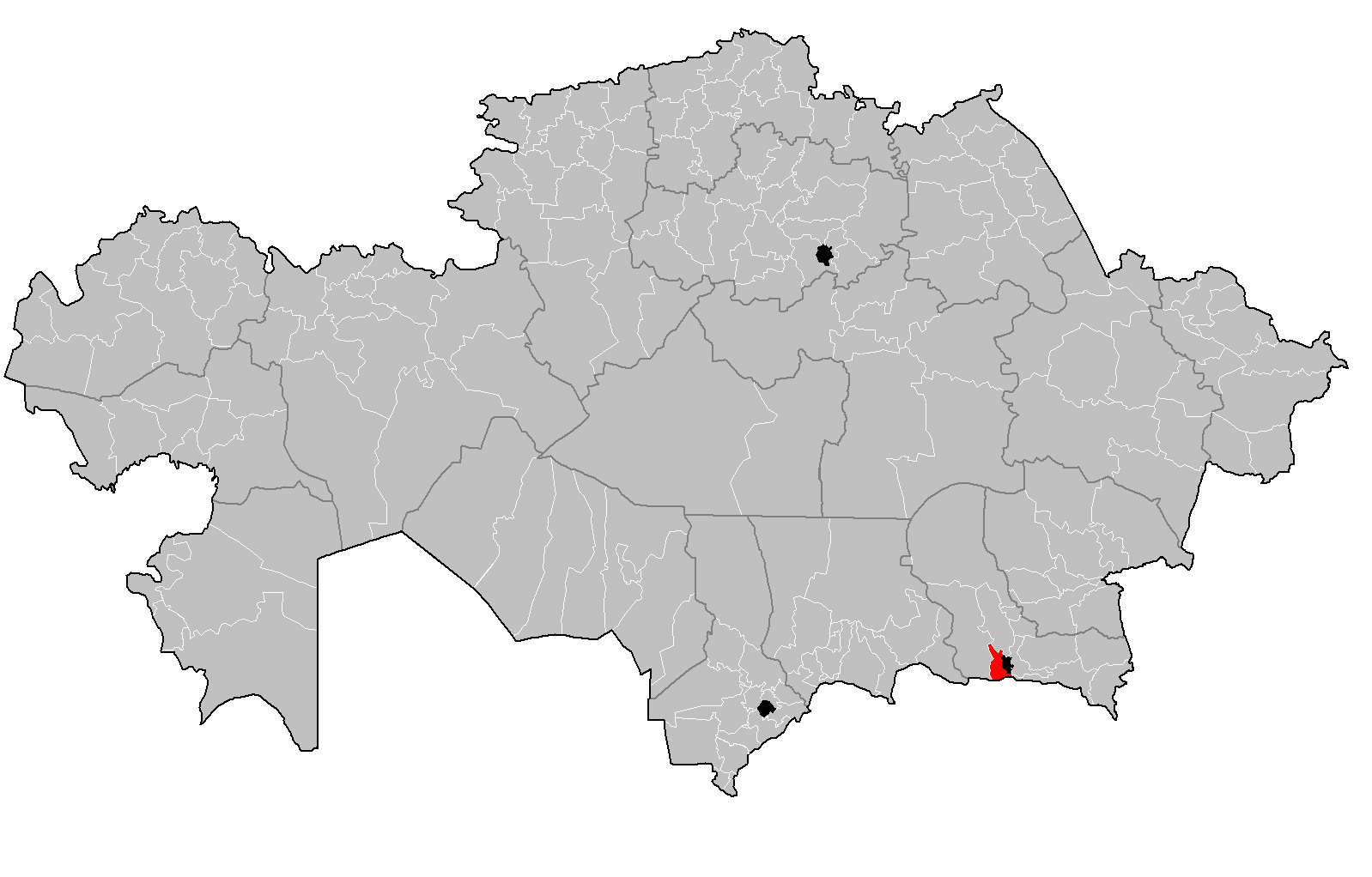
- Country: Kazakhstan
- Region: Almaty Region
- Administrative center: Kaskelen
- Founded: 1929

Government
  - Akim (mayor): Dalabaev Zhandarbek Ermekovich

Area
  - Total: 890 sq mi (2,300 km^{2})

Population (2013)
  - Total: 280,939
- Time zone: UTC+6 (East)

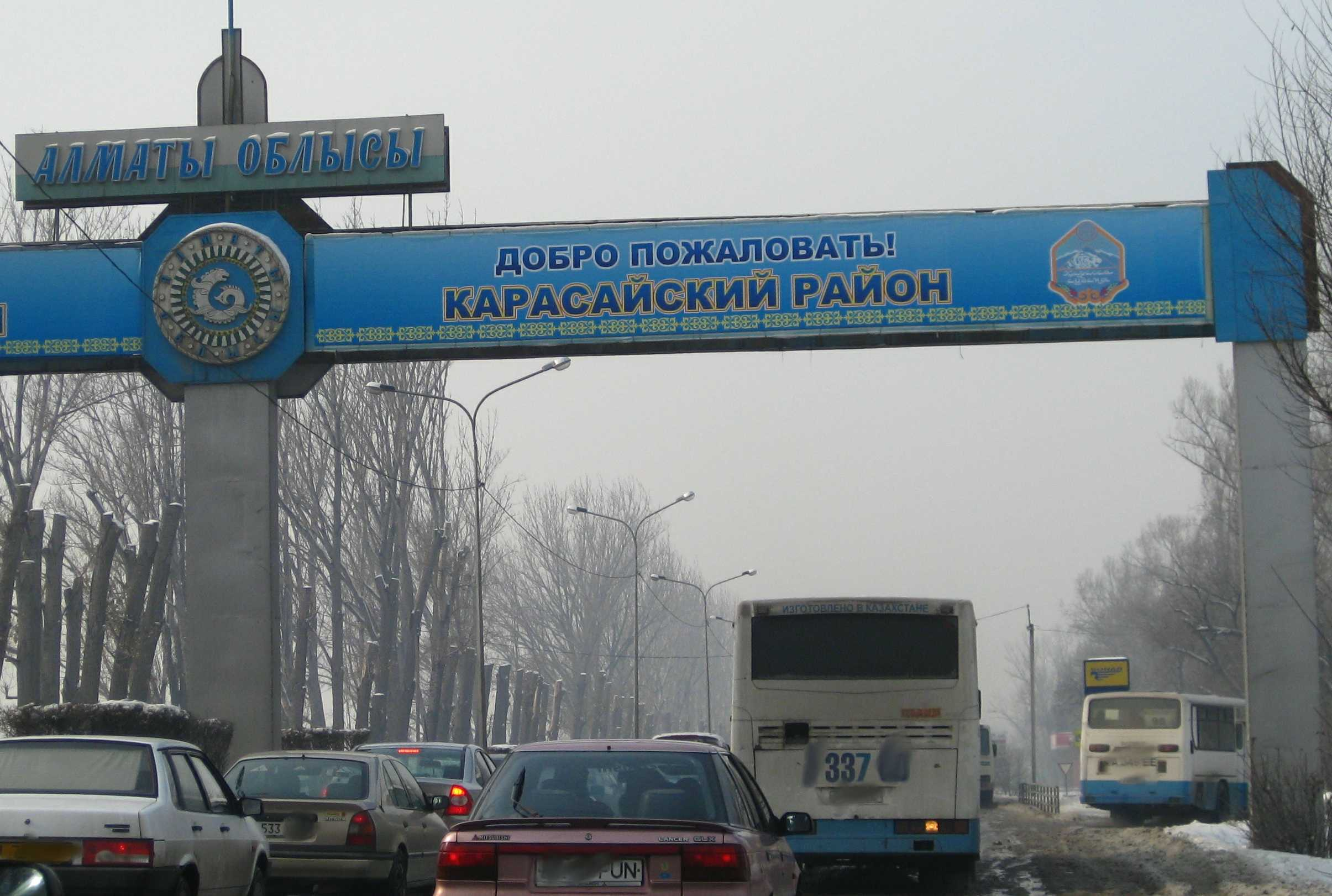
The welcome-sign at the entrance to the Karasay district from Almaty city

Karasay District (Kazakh: Қарасай ауданы, romanized: Qarasai audany; Russian: Карасайский район), formerly known as Kaskelen District, is a district of Almaty Region in Kazakhstan. Named in honor of Karasay Batyr, a legendary 17th-century Kazakh warrior and military commander who defended the region against foreign invasions. The administrative center of the district is the town of Kaskelen. Population: 280,939 (2013 estimate); 247,616 (2009 census results); 154,602 (1999 census results).
