= Almaty City Mäslihat =

Local legislature of Almaty, Kazakhstan

Almaty City Mäslihat Алматы қаласының мәслихаты (Kazakh) Маслихат города Алматы (Russian)

Type
- Type: Unicameral

History
- Founded: 10 December 1993
- Preceded by: Almaty City Soviet

Leadership
- Secretary: Meyirjan Otynşiev, Amanat since 30 March 2023

Structure
- Seats: 42
- Political groups: Government (25); Amanat (25); Support (17); Respublica (5); People's Party (3); Baytaq (3); Aq Jol (2); Independents (4)

Elections
- Last election: 19 March 2023
- Next election: 2028

Meeting place
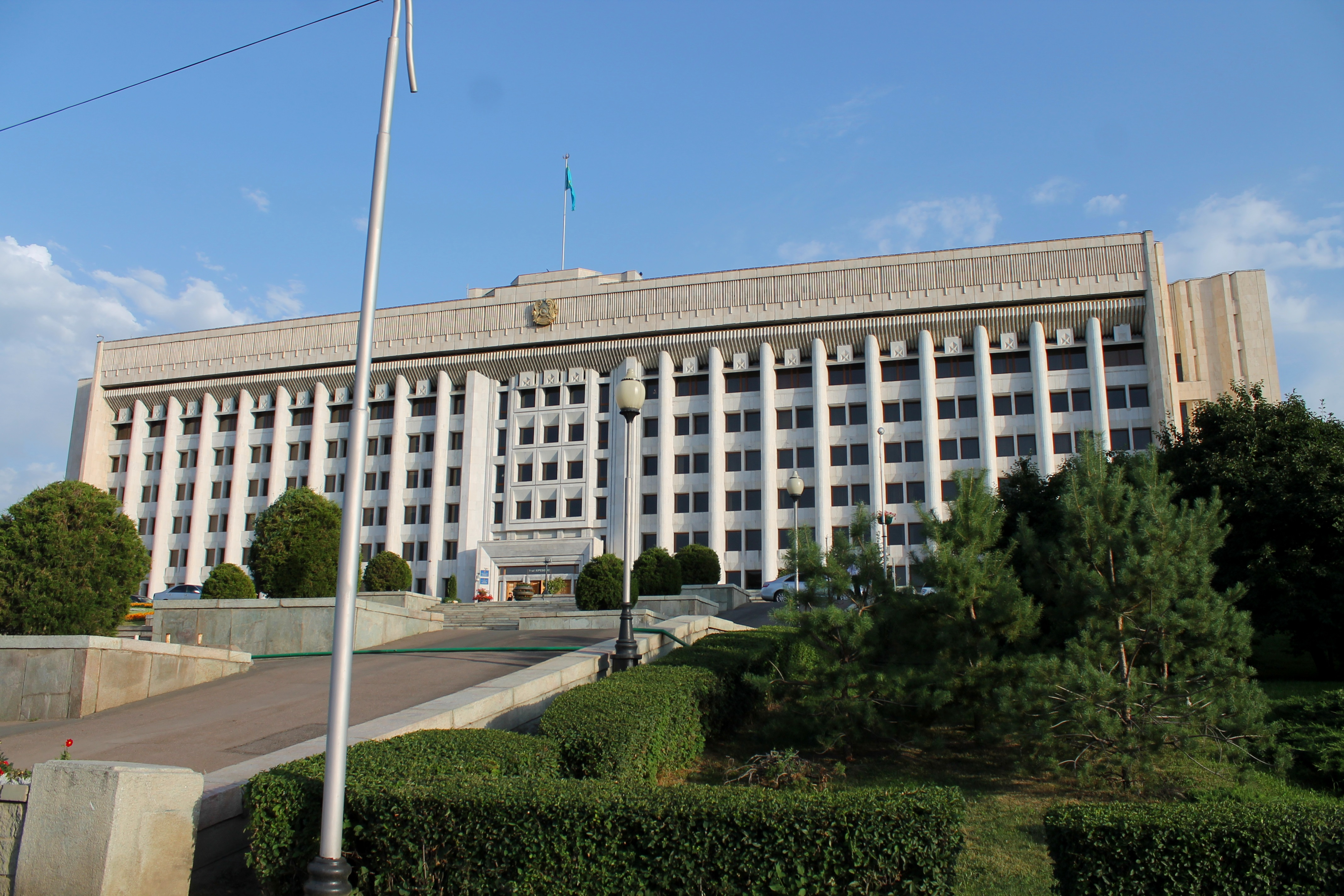

Website
- gov.kz/memleket/entities/maslihat-almaty

The Almaty City Mäslihat (Kazakh: Алматы қаласының мәслихаты, Almaty qalasynyñ mäslihaty; Russian: Маслихат города Алматы, romanized: Maslikhat goroda Almaty) is a local unicameral legislative branch in the city of Almaty. It is led by the current secretary, Meyirjan Otynşiev (Amanat).

== Composition ==
The City Mäslihat is composed of 42 deputies, half of which are elected through party-list proportional representation and the other half of which are elected regardless of their party affiliation, through single-mandate election. A deputy of the mäslihat may be a citizen of Kazakhstan who has reached 20 years of age and can be a member of only one mäslihat.

Members of the local legislature are elected every 5 years. Before the 2023 election, the Mäslihat deputies used to be elected by a 7% threshold through party-list proportional representation. If only one parties managed to bypass the electoral threshold, then the party would've won the second highest number of votes is granted enough seats for representation in the mäslihat regardless of whether it had passed the threshold or not.

== History ==
The Almaty City Mäslihat was established on 10 December 1993 following the adoption of the law introducing significant changes to the name and structure of local state bodies, including those in Almaty. The city held elections on 10 March 1994 to elect the deputies of the 1st convocation of the Mäslihat.

Until 2021, the Almaty City Mäslihat consisted of 37 deputies, who were elected from single-member districts by secret ballot every five years.

On 23 May 2018, it was announced that all mäslihat deputies would be elected through proportional representation, and this law was enacted in June 2018.

On 10 January 2021, the elections for the 39 deputies of the City Mäslihat were held for the first time using the party-list system. The Nur Otan party secured the majority with 29 seats, followed by three smaller parties. The 7th convocation of the Almaty City Mäslihat convened on 15 January, with Stanislav Kankurov elected as the secretary.

In the 2023 local elections, the electoral system for all mäslihats was changed again. Now, half of the deputies are elected through party-list proportional representation, while the other half are elected through single-mandate elections.

== Commissions ==
The City Mäslihat includes 6 standing commissions, which include:

- Commission on Economy, Finance, Assets, Public Administration Development, Public and Seismic Safety;
- Commission on construction, architecture, urbanism, land relations and development of public spaces;
- Commission on communal infrastructure, energy, water supply and urban mobility;
- Commission on entrepreneurship, investments, tourism and ecology;
- Commission on social development, culture, sport, religion and youth;
- Commission on Health, Education and Employment.
