= Almaly District =

Almaly District Алмалы ауданы
- District
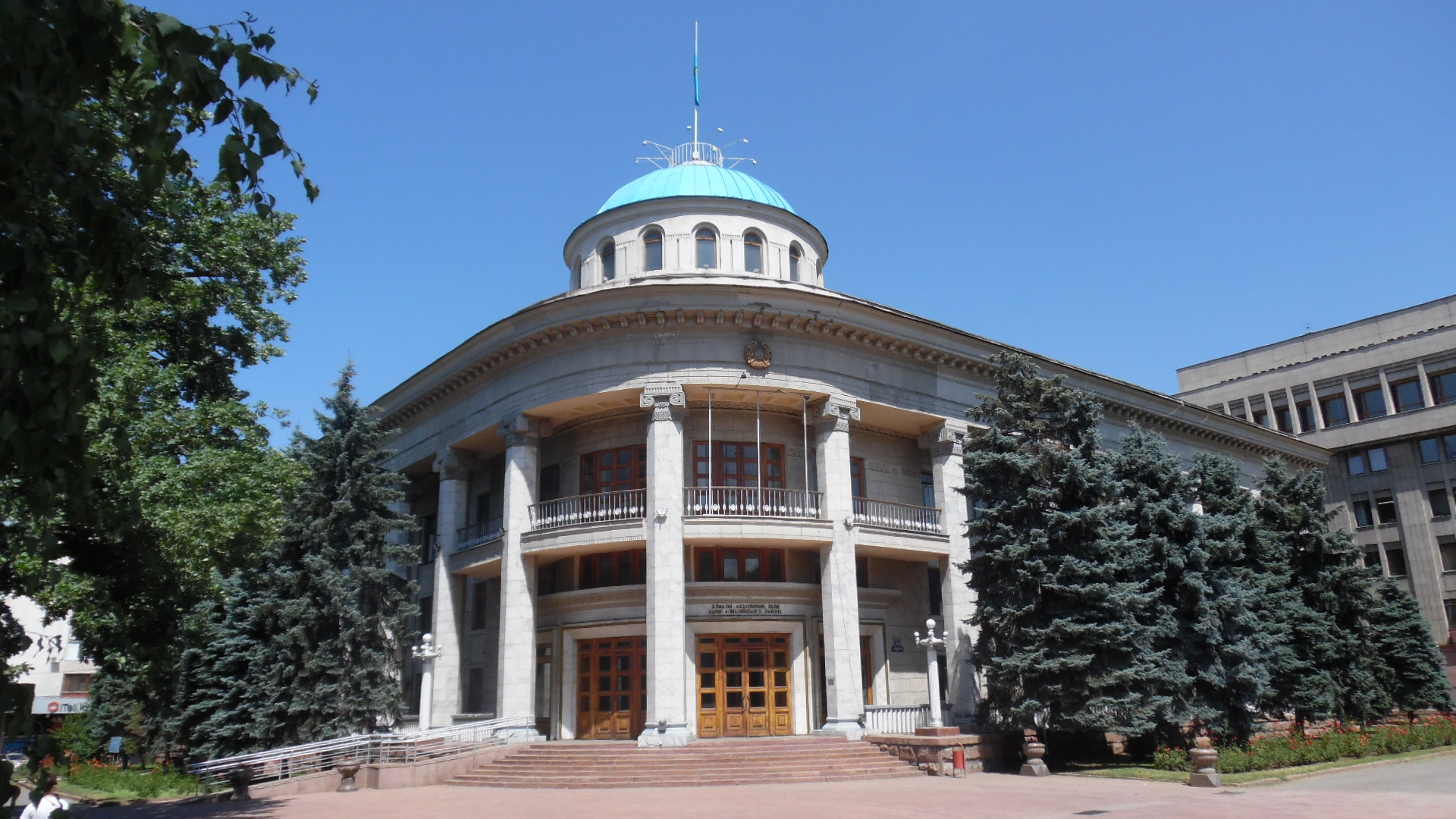
- Almaly District akimat

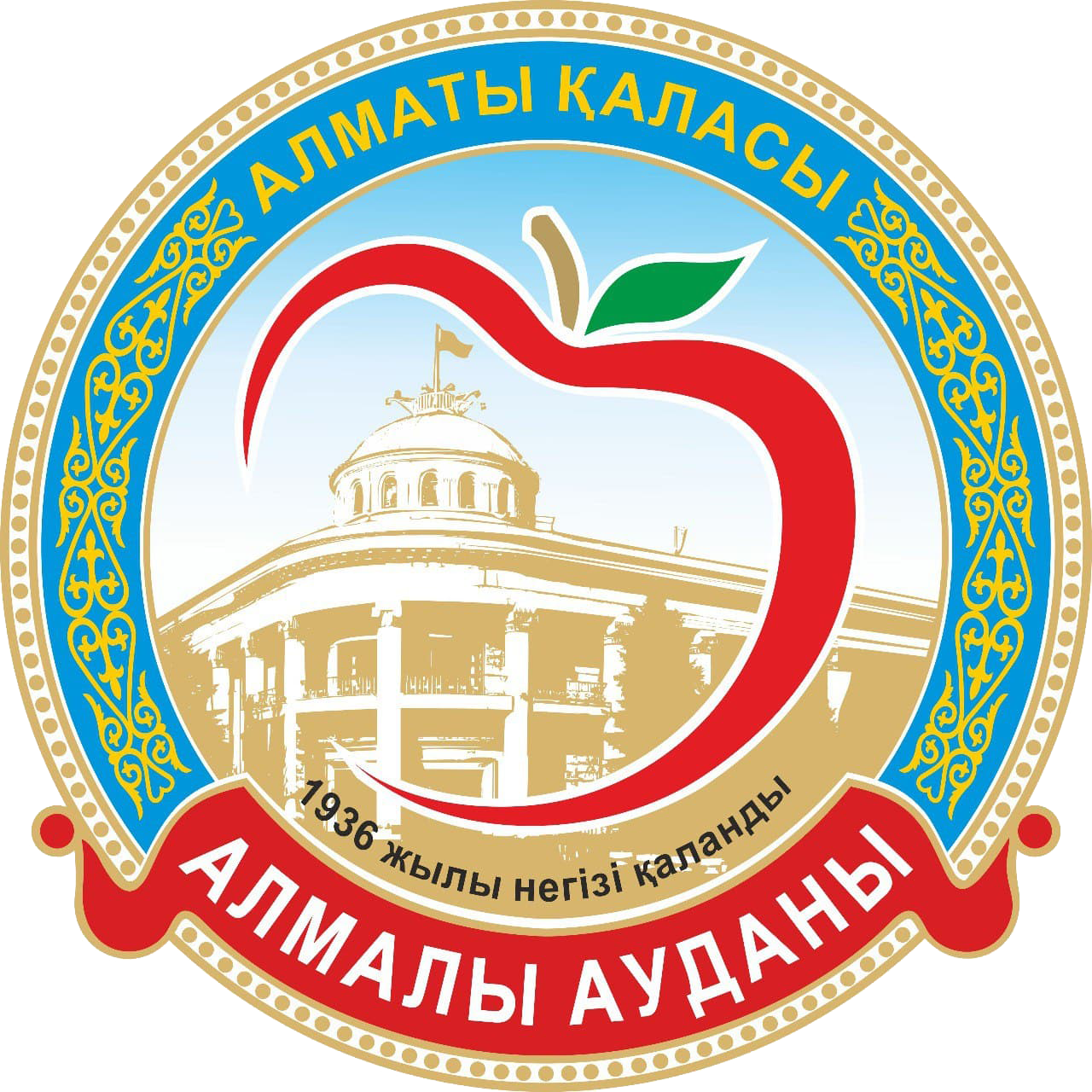
- Seal

- Map of Almaly District

- Location within Kazakhstan
- Country: Kazakhstan
- Region: Almaty
- Founded: 14 September 1936

Government
  - Akim: Arman Shamshin

Population (2019)
  - Total: 215,768
- Time zone: UTC+6 (UTC+6)

Almaly District (Kazakh: Алмалы ауданы) is an administrative subdivision of the city of Almaty.

== History ==
The district formed on 14 September 1936 as Stalin District by the decision of the Alma-Ata City Council of People's Deputies. On 10 March 1957, the district was renamed into the Soviet District which eventually became Almaly District on 12 December 1995. The district is located in the very center of the city. For many years this area was the administrative center and the center of the social and cultural life of Almaty.

Today, there are 449 industrial enterprises and 624 trade enterprises in the Almaly District.

On the territory of the district there are 20 universities, 19 colleges, 29 schools, 21 public and 8 private preschool institutions, 29 health care institutions, 5 museums, 8 libraries, 2 cinemas and 5 theaters.
