= Jetysu District =

Jetysu district
- City Districts
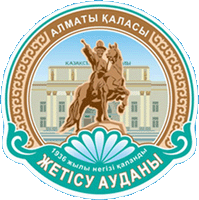
- Seal

- Location within Kazakhstan
- Country: Kazakhstan
- Province: Almaty

Government
  - Akim: Lyazzat Zhylkybayeva
- Time zone: UTC+6 (UTC+6)

Jetisu district is a district of Almaty, Kazakhstan.
