= Bostandyq District =

Coordinates: 43°12′N 76°54′E

Bostandyq District Бостандық ауданы
- District
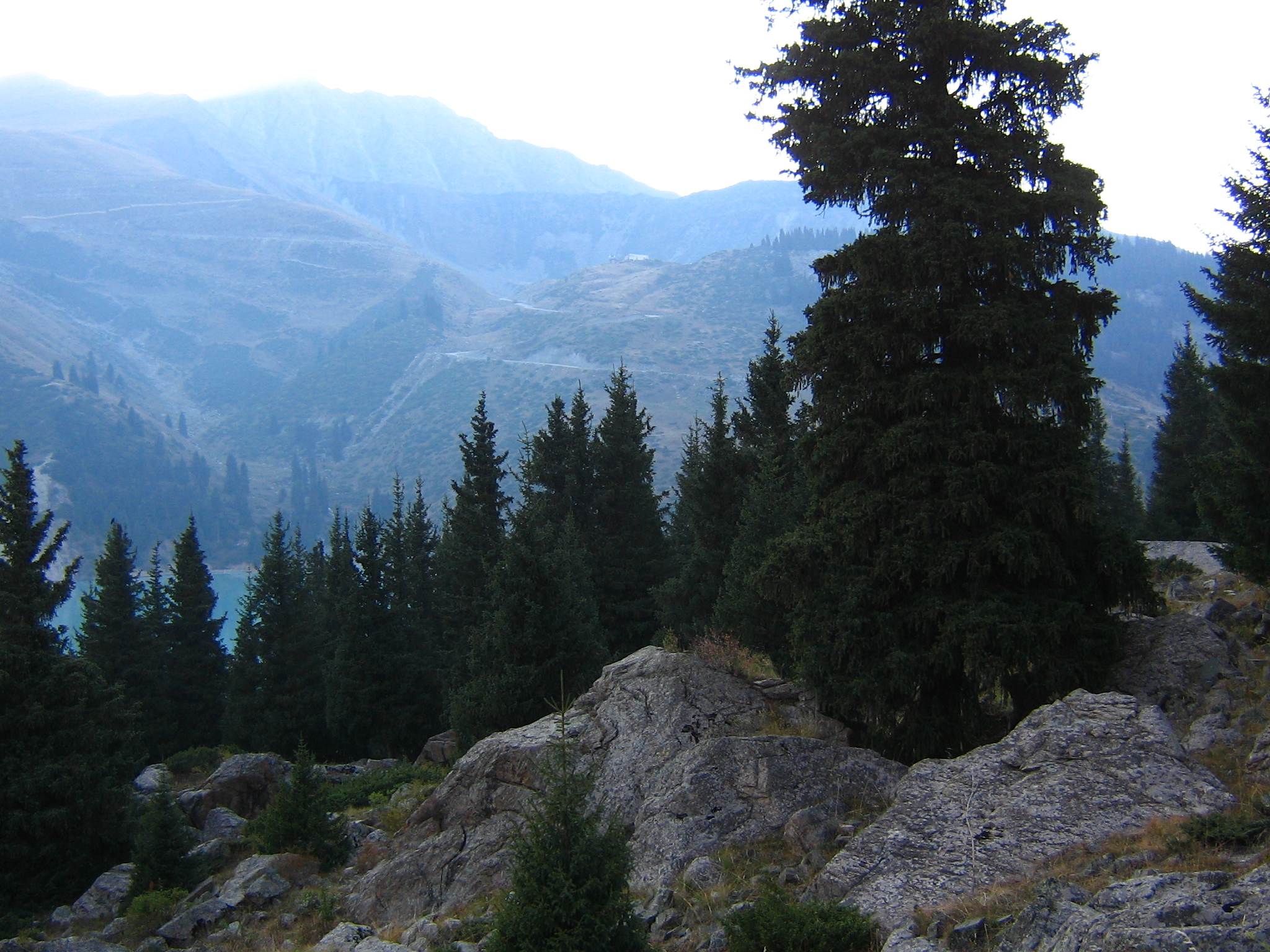

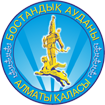
- Seal

- Map of Bostandyq District
- Country: Kazakhstan
- Region: Almaty
- Established: 31 January 1966

Government
  - Akim: Sanjar Alin

Population (2019)
  - Total: 343,541
- Time zone: UTC+5 (UTC+5)

The Bostandyq District (Kazakh: Бостандық ауданы "independence") is an administrative subdivision of the city of Almaty. The district has the youngest demographics with more than 71,000 students residing in it.

== History ==
The Bostandyq District was first established on 31 January 1966 by the Decree of the Presidium of the Supreme Soviet of the Kazakh SSR. It was named Kalinin District and was formed in connection with the expansion of the territory, the city at the expense of the adjacent lands and the disaggregation of the Soviet District.

In the early 1960s, the Exhibition of Achievements of the National Economy (VDNKh) opened its first pavilions; microdistricts "Koktem-1" and "Koktem-2" were built, reconstruction of the southern outskirts of the city began. The main Botanical Garden received the status of a research institution. Became the basis of education, culture and science of the region: the National Library of the Republic of Kazakhstan; Al-Farabi Kazakh National University; Kazakhfilm studio named after Shaken Aimanov; Satbayev University.

On 12 December 1995, the district was renamed into Bostandyq and over the years, the region has undergone significant changes in connection with the transformation of the Moskva and Alatau Districts.
