= Elections in Kazakhstan =

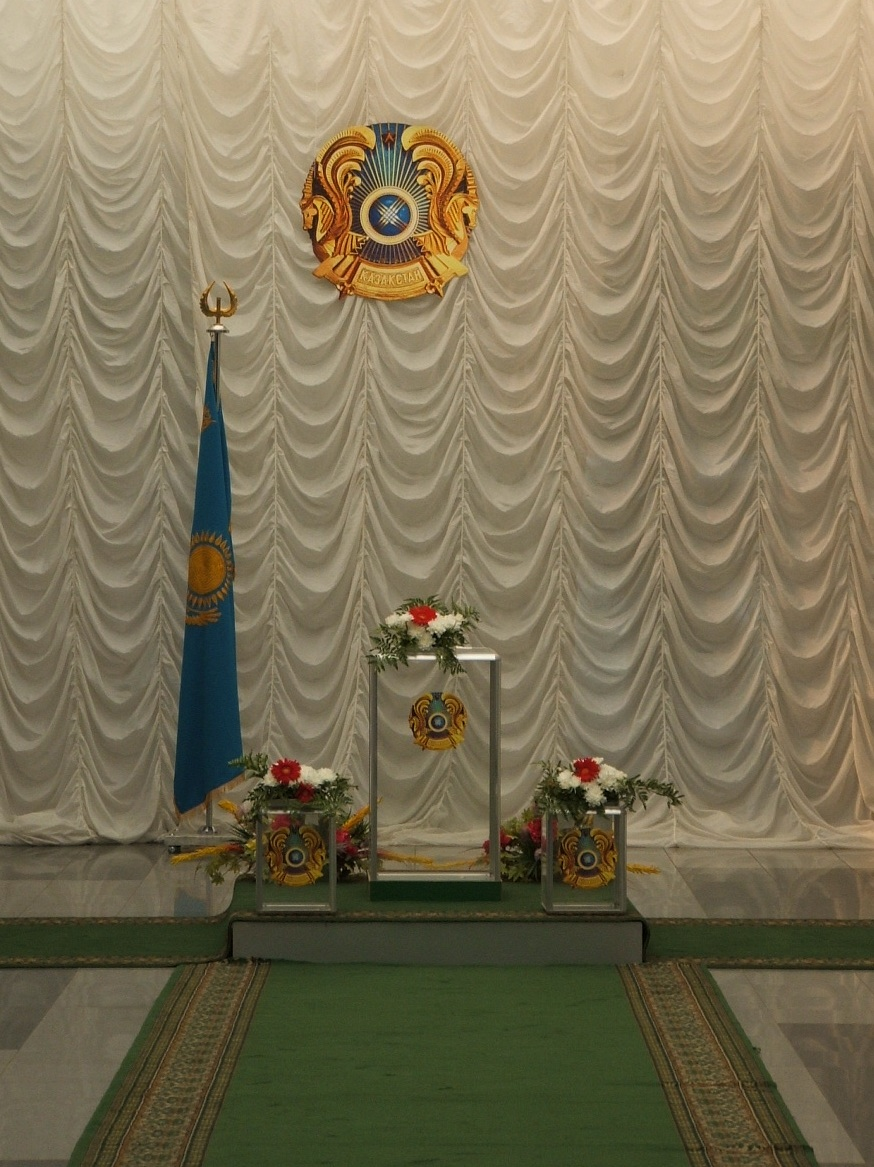
Ballot boxes, Kazakh flag and state seal in an Astana polling place before the 2007 legislative elections

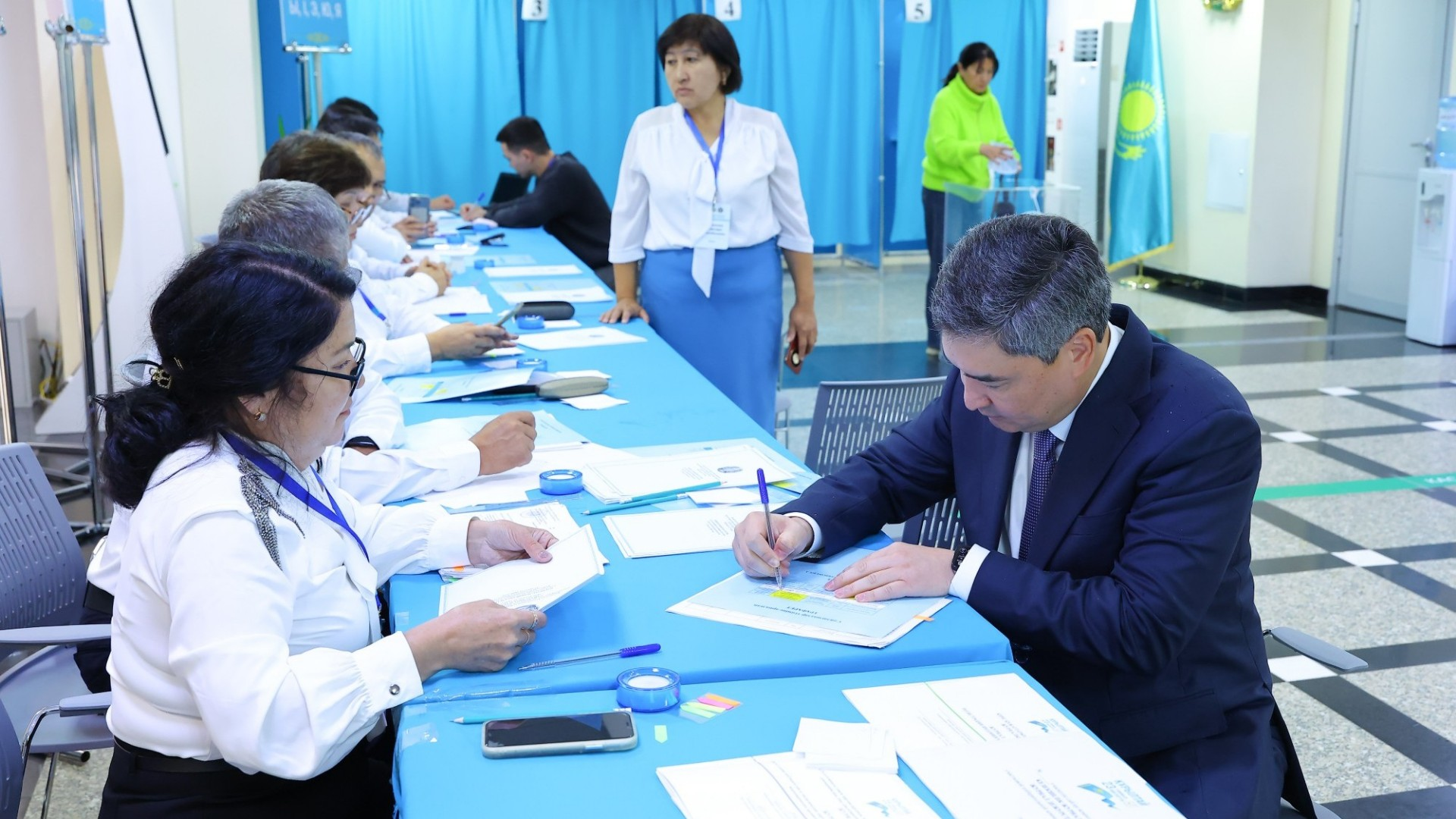
Prime Minister of Kazakhstan Oljas Bektenov votes in the latest 2026 Kazakh legislative election, August 2026

Elections in Kazakhstan are held on a national level to elect a President and the Kurultai, which is the unicameral legislature. Local elections for maslihats (local representative bodies) are held every five years.

Elections are administered by the Central Election Commission of the Republic of Kazakhstan.

There are 7 legal political parties in Kazakhstan. Kazakhstan’s political opposition is the most developed in the region in terms of its organizational abilities and resources.

None of the elections held in Kazakhstan have been considered free or fair by Western countries or international observers with issues noted including ballot tampering, multiple voting, repression of opposition candidates and press censorship. However, robust reforms have been implemented since 2019 and the OSCE ODI stated in its post-2021 parliamentary election report that "candidates were able to campaign freely." The OSCE Office for Democratic Institutions and Human Rights has deployed election monitors to Kazakhstan at the invitation of the government for observation of parliamentary and presidential elections since 1999.

== Latest elections ==
=== Presidential ===
In a follow-up to the announcement of the exit polls, the Central Election Commission (CEC) announced that it would present preliminary results of the election in a subsequent briefing on 21 November 2022 at 11:00. From there, the preliminary results showed Tokayev winning an overwhelming 81.3% majority of the vote, a higher margin in comparison to 2019, followed by Dairabaev who had garnered only 3.4%, thus making him the second-place frontrunner in the race and the first candidate to receive less than 5% of the vote since Turgyn Syzdyqov in 2015. The overall voter turnout had reached 69.4%, the lowest number of any in the presidential elections of Kazakhstan. For the first time since 1999, the ballot column "Against all" was reincluded in the election, to which 5.8% of Kazakh voters had cast their votes, making it the second overall most picked ballot column.

The following day the CEC confirmed the final results of the election by approving the voting protocols and certifying Tokayev's reelection win, who essentially became the president-elect.

Candidate	Party	Votes	%
Kassym-Jomart Tokayev	People's Coalition (Ind.)	6,456,392	81.31
Jiguli Dairabaev	Auyl People's Democratic Patriotic Party (Ind.)	271,641	3.42
Qaraqat Äbden	National Alliance of Professional Social Workers (Amanat)	206,206	2.60
Meiram Qajyken	"Amanat" Commonwealth of Trade Unions (Ind.)	200,907	2.53
Nurlan Äuesbaev	Nationwide Social Democratic Party	176,116	2.22
Saltanat Tursynbekova	Qazaq analary – dästürge jol (Amanat)	168,731	2.12
Against all		460,484	5.80
Total		7,940,477	100.00
Valid votes		7,940,477	95.67
Invalid/blank votes		359,569	4.33
Total votes		8,300,046	100.00
Registered voters/turnout		11,953,465	69.44
Source: CEC

=== Results by region ===
Results by region
Region	Tokayev		Dairabaev		Äbden		Qajyken		Äuesbaev		Tursynbekova		Against all	
Region	Votes	%	Votes	%	Votes	%	Votes	%	Votes	%	Votes	%	Votes	%
Abai Region	259,339	86.62%	9,173	3.06%	7,746	2.59%	6,039	2.02%	5,871	1.96%	4,103	1.37%	7,129	2.38%
Aqmola Region	318,652	79.75%	11,624	2.91%	6,194	1.55%	8,899	2.23%	10,820	2.71%	10,800	2.70%	32,575	8.15%
Aqtöbe Region	331,041	84.32%	18,908	4.82%	8,536	2.17%	4,125	1.05%	9,517	2.42%	9,312	2.37%	11,145	2.84%
Almaty Region	514,145	79.13%	25,987	4.00%	17,713	2.73%	27,535	4.24%	23,019	3.54%	13,980	2.15%	27,336	4.21%
Atyrau Region	211,720	78.23%	7,165	2.65%	8,624	3.19%	5,676	2.10%	5,312	1.96%	6,955	2.57%	25,194	9.31%
West Kazakhstan Region	239,148	82.07%	11,087	3.80%	8,611	2.95%	13,251	4.55%	3,726	1.28%	6,575	2.26%	9,009	3.09%
Jambyl Region	488,693	86.07%	12,353	2.18%	12,979	2.29%	16,524	2.91%	9,856	1.74%	10,781	1.90%	16,573	2.92%
Jetisu Region	298,311	84.15%	12,232	3.45%	8,961	2.53%	7,257	2.05%	10,666	3.01%	7,570	2.14%	9,487	2.68%
Qarağandy Region	476,971	80.04%	14,949	2.15%	18,747	3.15%	15,552	2.61%	12,082	2.03%	11,141	1.87%	46,472	7.80%
Qostanai Region	345,316	82.21%	12,961	3.09%	5,409	1.29%	6,156	1.47%	9,366	2.23%	9,192	2.19%	31,616	7.53%
Qyzylorda Region	289,699	76.89%	19,953	5.30%	10,651	2.83%	7,245	1.92%	7,871	2.09%	8,915	2.37%	32,424	8.61%
Mangystau Region	189,753	76.15%	14,231	5.71%	7,306	2.93%	2,679	1.08%	3,672	1.47%	5,803	2.33%	25,739	10.33%
Pavlodar Region	291,807	78.51%	10,722	2.88%	7,017	1.89%	14,136	3.80%	7,982	2.15%	9,911	2.67%	30,128	8.11%
North Kazakhstan Region	231,223	80.52%	6,727	2.34%	3,380	1.18%	8,961	3.12%	5,086	1.77%	5,409	1.88%	26,384	9.19%
Türkistan Region	800,353	86.63%	28,314	3.06%	32,129	3.48%	17,964	1.94%	13,152	1.42%	8,313	0.90%	23,655	2.56%
Ulytau Region	87,899	84.78%	2,985	2.88%	2,571	2.48%	1,445	1.39%	1,572	1.52%	1,902	1.83%	5,300	5.11%
East Kazakhstan Region	290,329	77.71%	12,810	3.43%	9,913	2.65%	11,019	2.95%	9,676	2.59%	10,849	2.90%	29,027	7.77%
Astana	288,093	80.31%	13,516	3.77%	9,017	2.51%	10,850	3.02%	7,109	1.98%	10,404	2.90%	19,716	5.50%
Almaty	196,178	67.31%	13,959	4.79%	10,375	3.56%	6,243	2.14%	11,902	4.08%	10,945	3.76%	41,874	14.37%
Shymkent	307,722	84.81%	11,985	3.30%	10,327	2.85%	9,351	2.58%	7,859	2.17%	5,871	1.62%	9,701	2.67%
Kazakhstan	6,456,392	81.31%	271,641	3.42%	206,206	2.60%	200,907	2.53%	176,116	2.22%	168,731	2.12%	460,484	5.80%

=== Voter turnout ===
Turnout was low in the two largest cities, with less than 30% of voters from Almaty participating, and less than half of voters from Astana participating. Turnout was higher elsewhere, ranging from almost 60% in Shymkent to over 81% in the newly formed Jetisu Region.

Region	Time						
Region	10:00	12:00	14:00	16:00	18:00	20:00	22:00
Abai Region	25.64%	43.67%	69.32%	73.57%	78.88%	80.18%	80.18%
Akmola Region	21.21%	40.13%	51.04%	71.38%	75.82%	78.87%	78.87%
Aktobe Region	26.66%	44.48%	53.21%	68.81%	71.23%	72.20%	72.81%
Almaty Region	20.12%	25.83%	40.85%	55.11%	70.92%	72.10%	72.10%
Atyrau Region	25.03%	40.42%	52.56%	60.87%	67.88%	70.87%	70.87%
West Kazakhstan Region	20.86%	27.55%	43.85%	54.62%	64.77%	67.77%	68.67%
Jambyl Region	23.27%	41.29%	52.74%	68.74%	77.27%	79.57%	79.57%
Jetisu Region	25.58%	42.18%	52.17%	68.88%	77.08%	81.43%	81.42%
Karaganda Region	32.27%	44.99%	53.75%	71.89%	77.80%	78.39%	78.39%
Kostanay Region	26.97%	42.87%	53.15%	71.38%	77.56%	79.28%	79.28%
Kyzylorda Region	29.41%	43.46%	59.18%	72.88%	77.20%	80.31%	81.07%
Mangystau Region	25.20%	41.19%	53.40%	59.61%	64.57%	66.18%	66.99%
Pavlodar Region	27.90%	44.23%	52.55%	72.73%	77.12%	77.58%	77.58%
North Kazakhstan Region	27.33%	43.64%	53.10%	72.21%	77.46%	78.24%	79.01%
Turkistan Region	27.03%	64.21%	76.61%	80.09%	80.25%	80.37%	80.37%
Ulytau Region	27.81%	52.22%	68.32%	72.75%	74.45%	75.48%	75.48%
East Kazakhstan Region	23.17%	41.86%	52.99%	68.42%	76.81%	79.49%	79.49%
Astana	13.73%	19.33%	39.79%	44.39%	48.01%	48.67%	48.60%
Almaty	8.42%	16.89%	24.17%	26.19%	27.93%	28.72%	28.72%
Shymkent	30.92%	34.41%	51.69%	56.28%	59.56%	59.79%	59.79%
Kazakhstan	23.37%	38.55%	51.16%	62.34%	67.85%	69.31%	69.43%

=== Mäjilis ===
In the early morning of 20 March 2023, the Central Election Commission (CEC) announced the preliminary election results summed up from electronic copies of the voting result protocols by the territorial and district election commissions. From there, the ruling Amanat party had officially won majority of 53.9% of the proportional vote share, marking it one of the worst performances for the party since the 1999 legislative election. In the constituencies, the preliminary results showed the Amanat party winning an overwhelming majority of 22 seats (+1 independent candidate affiliated with the party) out of a total of 29 contested seats, leaving the rest of seven mandates to be won by independents in their representing electoral districts.

The final results of the 2023 legislative election were published by the CEC on 27 March 2023, revealing the upcoming seating composition of the 8th Majilis according to party-list, with the ruling Amanat party winning 40 seats, followed by Auyl with 8 seats, Respublica and Aq Jol with 6 seats each, the People's Party of Kazakhstan (QHP) with 5 seats, and the self-declared opposition Nationwide Social Democratic Party (JSDP) secured 4 seats, while Baytaq failed to surpass the 5% electoral threshold.

Party	Party-list			Constituency			Total seats	+/–
Party	Votes	%	Seats	Votes	%	Seats	Total seats	+/–
Amanat	3,431,510	53.90	40	2,886,468	45.67	22	62	–14
Auyl People's Democratic Patriotic Party	693,938	10.90	8	79,045	1.25	0	8	+8
Respublica	547,154	8.59	6	9,497	0.15	0	6	New
Aq Jol	535,139	8.41	6	121,069	1.92	0	6	–6
People's Party of Kazakhstan	432,920	6.80	5	87,803	1.39	0	5	–5
Nationwide Social Democratic Party	331,058	5.20	4	31,702	0.50	0	4	New
Baytaq Green Party of Kazakhstan	146,431	2.30	0	17,166	0.27	0	0	New
Russian Community of Kazakhstan				7,957	0.13	0	0	New
Veterans of the GSFG and Group of Warsaw Pact Forces				5,043	0.08	0	0	New
Astana City Veterans of the Nagorno-Karabakh conflict				3,585	0.06	0	0	New
Federation of Kazakhstani Motorists				1,569	0.02	0	0	New
Independents				2,820,810	44.63	7	7	New
Against all	248,291	3.90	–	248,283	3.93	–	–	–
Total	6,366,441	100.00	69	6,319,997	100.00	29	98	–9
Valid votes	6,366,441	97.58		6,319,997	99.06			
Invalid/blank votes	158,046	2.42		60,227	0.94			
Total votes	6,524,487	100.00		6,380,224	100.00			
Registered voters/turnout	12,035,578	54.21		12,023,562	53.06			
Source: CEC CEC Nomad.su

=== Voter turnout ===
Region	Time						
Region	10:00	12:00	14:00	16:00	18:00	20:00	22:00
Kazakhstan	1,710,381 (14.21%)	3,687,608 (30.65%)	5,635,462 (46.84%)	6,254,837 (51.98%)	6,390,046 (53.11%)	6,509,695 (54.09%)	6,521,860 (54.19%)
Abai Region	15.13%	33.58%	52.28%	55.23%	56.14%	57.02%	57.02%
Akmola Region	15.61%	33.63%	52.12%	58.96%	59.49%	60.01%	60.01%
Aktobe Region	12.44%	33.18%	51.28%	56.32%	56.88%	57.45%	58.00%
Almaty Region	15.32%	34.41%	52.13%	59.45%	59.74%	60.03%	60.03%
Atyrau Region	12.94%	30.66%	36.15%	48.15%	49.19%	50.22%	51.23%
West Kazakhstan Region	12.96%	33.61%	55.14%	58.61%	58.81%	59.01%	59.20%
Jambyl Region	16.54%	35.82%	58.32%	64.78%	65.00%	65.21%	65.21%
Jetisu Region	15.93%	33.15%	52.41%	54.82%	55.07%	55.32%	55.32%
Karaganda Region	16.31%	34.19%	56.97%	58.21%	58.85%	59.48%	59.48%
Kostanay Region	16.23%	37.39%	62.36%	64.81%	65.00%	65.10%	65.10%
Kyzylorda Region	12.64%	32.78%	54.31%	64.95%	65.70%	66.46%	67.21%
Mangystau Region	12.36%	32.43%	49.18%	53.84%	54.04%	54.08%	54.10%
Pavlodar Region	16.49%	34.26%	51.24%	58.43%	58.61%	58.68%	58.68%
North Kazakhstan Region	15.93%	32.81%	49.68%	63.66%	64.46%	65.25%	65.25%
Turkistan Region	15.62%	38.29%	48.37%	49.14%	51.07%	53.01%	53.01%
Ulytau Region	16.38%	34.61%	52.29%	58.26%	58.63%	58.99%	58.99%
East Kazakhstan Region	16.11%	34.16%	58.69%	63.09%	63.63%	64.15%	64.15%
Astana	13.58%	23.35%	33.65%	38.57%	40.94%	42.91%	42.91%
Almaty	8.51%	11.25%	15.38%	19.14%	22.95%	25.82%	25.82%
Shymkent	12.57%	19.63%	35.61%	42.31%	43.89%	45.46%	45.46%

=== Results by region ===
==== Constituency vote ====
Results by constituency
Constituency			Elected deputy				Runner-up
Region	No.	Total seats	Candidate	Party	Votes	%	Runner-up
Astana	1	2	Däulet Turlyhanov	Amanat	71,698	47.03%	Täñirbergen Berdoñğarov, Independent; 11.20% (17,079 votes)
Astana	2	2	Däulet Muqaev	Independent	51,769	29.51%	Arman Şoraev, Independent; 18.05% (31,669 votes)
Almaty	3	3	Ermurat Bapi	Independent	23,690	27.93%	Inga Imanbai, Independent (QDP); 8.01% (6,798 votes)
Almaty	4	3	Erlan Stambekov	Independent	15,930	20.66%	Sanjar Boqaev, Independent (Namys); 15.12% (11,660 votes)
Almaty	5	3	Baqytjan Bazarbek	Independent (Amanat)	22,685	21.59%	Muhtar Taijan, Independent (Jer Qorgany); 12.26% (12,882 votes)
Shymkent	6	2	Danabek Isabekov	Amanat	21,098	36.80%	Ğalymjan Äbişev, Independent; 14.70% (8,430 votes)
Shymkent	7	2	Bolatbek Najmetdinuly	Amanat	19,851	21.06%	Abai Praliev, Independent; 18.37% (17,319 votes)
Abai Region	8	1	Nurtai Sabilianov	Amanat	131,872	58.02%	Ashat Januzaqov, Independent; 12.69% (28,841 votes)
Akmola Region	9	1	Aina Mysyrälimova	Amanat	154,587	50.72%	Arman Berdalin, Independent; 13.68% (41,708 votes)
Aktobe Region	10	1	Qazybek Älişev	Amanat	238,195	74.51%	Tättigül Talaeva, Independent; 5.42% (17,326 votes)
Almaty Region	11	2	Ardaq Nazarov	Independent	122,242	38.24%	Rysbek Särsenbai, Independent (Bizdin Tandau); 13.63% (43,565 votes)
Almaty Region	12	2	Daniar Qasqaraurov	Independent	153,225	63.76%	Sydyq Däuletov, Amanat; 21.69% (71,071 votes)
Atyrau Region	13	1	Ädil Jubanov	Amanat	107,973	53.19%	Särsenbai Eñsegenov, Independent; 19.80% (40,185 votes)
West Kazakhstan Region	14	1	Abzal Quspan	Independent	126,784	50.22%	Luqpan Ahmediarov, Independent; 18.29% (46,172 votes)
Jambyl Region	15	2	Muqaş Eskendirov	Amanat	99,021	48.15%	Serik Sälemov, Independent; 34.88% (71,719 votes)
Jambyl Region	16	2	Güldara Nurymova	Amanat	190,078	74.89%	Mädina Jatqanbaeva, Aq Jol; 10.49% (26,628 votes)
Jetisu Region	17	1	Ruslan Qojasbaev	Amanat	132,678	55.81%	Saiat Niusupov, Independent; 7.63% (18,135 votes)
Karaganda Region	18	2	Qudaibergen Beksultanov	Amanat	132,471	60.26%	Mahmut Älipbergenov, QHP; 14.24% (31,306 votes)
Karaganda Region	19	2	Arman Qalyqov	Amanat	145,228	63.84%	Rauan Şaekin, Independent; 10.49% (23,864 votes)
Kostanay Region	20	1	Erkin Äbil	Amanat	192,175	54.17%	Berikjan Qaiypbai, Auyl; 7.33% (26,002 votes)
Kyzylorda Region	21	1	Marhabat Jaiymbetov	Amanat	148,646	31.11%	Säbit Päzilov, Independent; 18.77% (89,697 votes)
Mangystau Region	22	1	Edil Jañbyrşin	Amanat	117,880	52.60%	Qaiyrbek Maqulov, Independent; 20.93% (46,909 votes)
Pavlodar Region	23	1	Jarkynbek Amantai	Amanat	168,625	56.69%	Rysty Jumabekova, Independent; 13.11% (39,001 votes)
North Kazakhstan Region	24	1	Erkebulan Mämbetov	Amanat	153,736	63.73%	Oleg Ivanov, Independent; 10.13% (24,436 votes)
Turkistan Region	25	3	Qairat Balabiev	Amanat	142,595	73.50%	Hudaişuqyr Abdullaev, Independent; 15.88% (30,811 votes)
Turkistan Region	26	3	Ulasbek Sädibekov	Amanat	92,445	54.45%	Jasur Momynjanov, Independent; 17.44% (29,602 votes)
Turkistan Region	27	3	Temir Qyryqbaev	Amanat	117,584	54.87%	Nūrjan Ältaev, Independent (El Tıregı); 16.39% (35,116 votes)
Ulytau Region	28	1	Erbolat Satybaldin	Amanat	44,406	55.95%	Dulat Süleimenov, Independent; 10.10% (8,016 votes)
East Kazakhstan Region	29	1	Luqbek Tumaşinov	Amanat	165,596	54.99%	Sergei Bogolomov, Independent; 6.51% (19,609 votes)

==== Party-list vote ====
Party-list results by region
Region	Registered voters	Amanat		Auyl		Respublica		Aq Jol		QHP		JSDP		Baytaq		Against all		Invalid/ blank	Total	
Region	Registered voters	Votes	%	Votes	%	Votes	%	Votes	%	Votes	%	Votes	%	Votes	%	Votes	%	Invalid/ blank	Votes	%
Abai Region	416,191	158,103	67.81%	13,919	5.97%	14,199	6.09%	9,000	3.86%	15,528	6.66%	11,285	4.84%	1,562	0.67%	9,559	4.10%	4,143	237,298	57.02%
Aqmola Region	517,816	204,078	69.51%	19,289	6.57%	15,414	5.25%	10,980	3.74%	18,027	6.14%	5,960	2.03%	8,103	2.76%	11,744	4.00%	17,161	310,756	60.01%
Aqtöbe Region	562,698	143,763	44.95%	48,198	15.07%	20,885	6.53%	43,624	13.64%	16,855	5.27%	17,654	5.52%	12,921	4.04%	15,927	4.98%	6,537	326,364	58.00%
Almaty Region	966,304	313,949	55.03%	51,007	8.94%	47,643	8.35%	43,561	7.64%	38,428	6.74%	29,324	5.14%	19,649	3.44%	26,901	4.72%	9,610	580,072	60.03%
Atyrau Region	412,382	92,484	44.30%	26,764	12.82%	39,290	18.82%	20,877	10.00%	9,708	4.65%	8,163	3.91%	3,967	1.90%	7,516	3.60%	2,494	211,263	51.23%
West Kazakhstan Region	442,446	128,081	49.85%	26,567	10.34%	17,189	6.69%	34,378	13.38%	20,914	8.14%	14,465	5.63%	2,312	0.90%	13,027	5.07%	4,995	261,928	59.20%
Jambyl Region	717,116	206,250	44.89%	80,773	17.58%	57,157	12.44%	55,503	12.08%	18,608	4.05%	17,643	3.84%	8,684	1.89%	14,840	3.23%	8,173	467,631	65.21%
Jetisu Region	443,617	107,413	44.67%	32,005	13.31%	45,254	18.82%	21,882	9.10%	9,186	3.82%	9,642	4.01%	5,531	2.30%	9,546	3.97%	4,949	245,408	55.32%
Qarağandy Region	761,673	231,756	52.15%	28,531	6.42%	81,148	18.26%	30,442	6.85%	31,686	7.13%	18,221	4.10%	7,022	1.58%	15,599	3.51%	8,638	453,043	59.48%
Qostanai Region	554,741	226,607	63.91%	37,797	10.66%	21,806	6.15%	25,848	7.29%	14,360	4.05%	16,098	4.54%	4,716	1.33%	7,340	2.07%	6,558	361,130	65.10%
Qyzylorda Region	486,034	175,664	54.84%	39,976	12.48%	25,764	8.04%	27,121	8.47%	9,962	3.11%	16,625	5.19%	12,685	3.96%	12,525	3.91%	6,341	326,663	67.21%
Mangystau Region	418,123	68,294	30.75%	23,343	10.51%	35,292	15.89%	32,560	14.66%	14,703	6.62%	23,409	10.54%	13,704	6.17%	10,794	4.86%	4,103	226,202	54.10%
Pavlodar Region	512,343	199,160	67.33%	9,998	3.38%	12,660	4.28%	14,464	4.89%	35,555	12.02%	10,471	3.54%	4,792	1.62%	8,696	2.94%	4,856	300,652	58.68%
North Kazakhstan Region	384,148	121,900	52.13%	18,800	8.04%	8,558	3.66%	46,042	19.69%	15,737	6.73%	6,781	2.90%	7,226	3.09%	8,792	3.76%	16,820	250,656	65.25%
Türkistan Region	1,168,728	293,134	48.86%	140,322	23.39%	12,897	2.15%	28,010	4.67%	55,765	9.30%	51,223	8.54%	7,401	1.23%	11,151	1.86%	19,588	619,491	53.01%
Ulytau Region	141,312	52,417	63.94%	6,919	8.44%	2,320	2.83%	5,861	7.15%	6,075	7.41%	4,394	5.36%	1,008	1.23%	2,984	3.64%	1,381	83,359	58.99%
East Kazakhstan Region	499,206	183,902	58.46%	50,238	15.97%	23,688	7.53%	16,484	5.24%	11,702	3.72%	13,716	4.36%	2,800	0.89%	12,048	3.83%	5,662	320,240	64.15%
Astana	788,931	186,496	55.91%	17,445	5.23%	24,283	7.28%	32,055	9.61%	34,957	10.48%	17,579	5.27%	5,137	1.54%	15,611	4.68%	7,555	341,118	42.91%
Almaty	1,202,078	150,312	50.33%	14,604	4.89%	29,208	9.78%	19,203	6.43%	33,688	11.28%	19,144	6.41%	13,887	4.65%	18,606	6.23%	11,764	310,416	25.82%
Shymkent	639,691	187,747	66.09%	7,443	2.62%	12,499	4.40%	17,244	6.07%	21,476	7.56%	19,261	6.78%	3,324	1.17%	15,085	5.31%	6,718	290,797	45.46%
Kazakhstan	12,035,578	3,431,510	53.90%	693,938	10.90%	547,154	8.59%	535,139	8.41%	432,920	6.80%	331,058	5.20%	146,431	2.30%	248.291	3.90%	158,046	6,524,487	54.21%

== Election procedures and technology ==
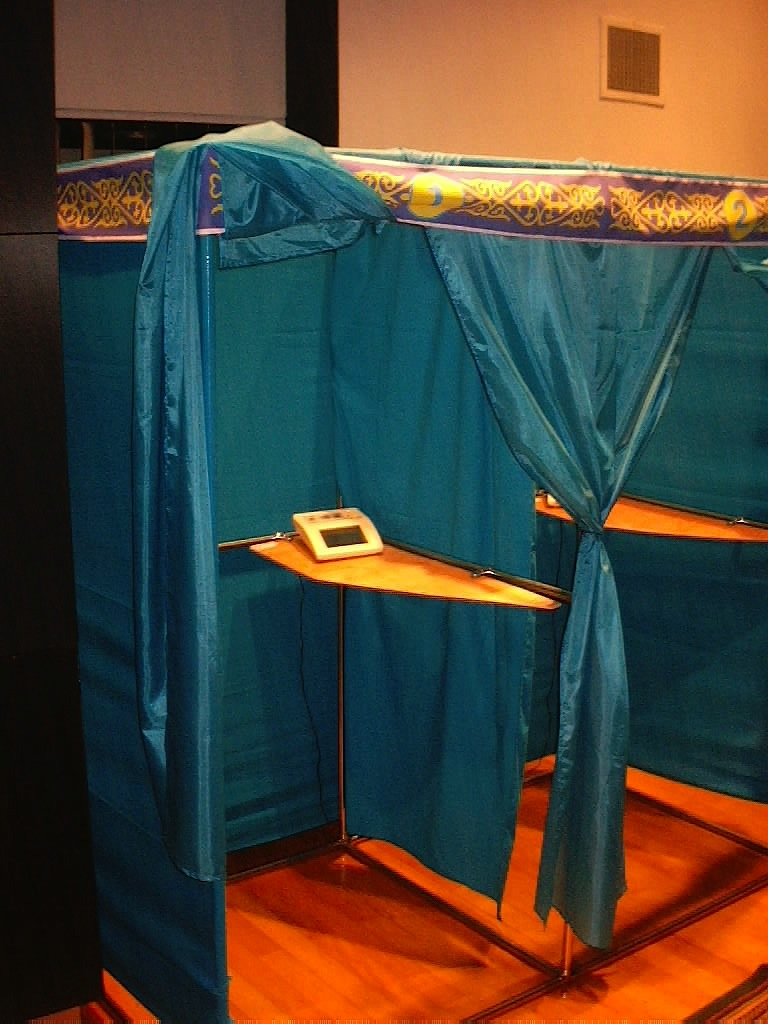
Voting booths, each with an AIS "Sailau" touch-screen electronic voting machine.

Prior to the 2012 parliamentary elections, many Kazakh voters were offered a choice of voting on electronic voting machines or on paper ballots. At least some of the ballot boxes used in Kazakhstan are transparent in order to defend against ballot box stuffing. Each polling place was equipped with both a large ballot box and smaller mobile ballot boxes. The latter are designed to be carried, by poll-workers, to voters outside the polling place. This is an alternative to offering absentee ballots or proxy voting for voters with disabilities that prevent them from going to the polls.

Electronic voting in Kazakhstan is based on the AIS "Sailau" electronic voting system developed in Belarus and Kazakhstan. This system is best described as an indirect-recording electronic voting system, as opposed to the DRE voting machines that have been more widely studied. In this system, the touch-screen voting terminal in the voting booth serves as a ballot marking device, recording selections on a smart card. The voting terminal itself retains no record of the vote after the voter takes the smart card. The voter then takes the smart card containing the cast ballot record to the computer at the registration table that serves as the electronic ballot box where the permanent record of the vote is retained and tabulated.

On November 16, 2011, Kuandyk Turgankulov, head of the Central Election Commission, said that the Sailau system would be discontinued because the voters prefer paper ballots, the political parties do not trust it, and the country lacks the funds required to update the system.

== Election financing ==
Candidates for elected office in Kazakhstan can receive state financial support to cover campaign costs. In Senate elections, each candidate receives about $2,170.

In Senate races, the state budget pays for each candidate’s 15-minute TV address (115 thousand tenge, approx. $303), 10 minutes on the radio (60 thousand tenge, approx. $158), 2 articles in the media (105 thousand tenge, approx. $276), hall rent for meeting with the voters (20 thousand tenge, approx. $53), publication of printed campaign materials (25 thousand tenge, approx. $66) and traveling (for Oblasts - 70 thousand tenge, approx. $184; for Astana and Almaty cities - 35 thousand tenge, approx. $92).

== Observation ==
There have been several international election observation missions organised in Kazakhstan. The OSCE has observed the elections.

Elections	date	observing organisation	head of mission
early Majilis	March 20, 2016	ODIHR/OSCE	Boris Frlec
early Majilis	March 20, 2016	executive committee/CIS	Sergey Lebedev
early presidential	April 26, 2015	ODIHR/OSCE	Cornelia Jonker
early Majilis	January 15, 2012	ODIHR/OSCE	Miklós Haraszti
early senate	January 15, 2012	ODIHR/OSCE	Miklós Haraszti

== Presidential elections ==
Kazakhstan's president is elected by the people and serves a single seven-year term.

Term limits were removed for the incumbent Nursultan Nazarbayev on 18 May 2007, when parliament also voted to reduce the term length from seven to five years.

Early presidential elections were called by President Nazarbayev and were held on April 26, 2015. President Barack Obama sent a letter to President Nazarbayev congratulating him on his reelection in the April 26 election.

After President Nazarbayev' resignation in March 2019, snap presidential elections were held on June 9, 2019 with former Senate Chair Kassym-Jomart Tokayev emerging as the winner. In September 2022, the parliament approved changing the term length from five to seven years while lowering the amount of terms to one. In the same month, early presidential elections were called for 20 November 2022.

== Parliamentary elections ==
The legislature, known as the Parliament (Parlamenti), has two chambers.

The Assembly (Mazhilis) has 98 members elected for a five-year term, in general elections, in the following way: 70% (69 deputies) from closed list party-list proportional representation allocated using the largest remainder method and 30% (29 deputies) from single-member districts that use the first-past-the-post voting (FPTP) method. There is a 5% electoral threshold.

The Senate has 50 members, 40 of whom are elected to six-year terms by delegates from the 17 provinces and three national cities, half of whom are elected every three years, and 10 are appointed by the President of Kazakhstan.

== Municipal elections ==
Citizens for the first time voted to elect local officials on July 25, 2021. Officials were previously appointed to their positions.

== International criticisms ==
As of March 2015, none of the elections held in Kazakhstan have been considered free or fair by Western countries or international observers. The 1999 Presidential election attracted criticism from the United States and the Organization for Security and Co-operation in Europe (OSCE) who considered that harassment and intimidation of opposition candidates and supporters and the disqualification of an opponent of Nazarbayev had made a meaningful election impossible. The OSCE criticised the 2011 presidential election, citing a lack of press freedom, transparency and competition. Following the 2005 election, they noted a number of issues, including ballot tampering, multiple voting, intimidation and harassment of opposition candidates and their supporters, media bias and official restrictions on free expression.

== See also ==
- Electoral calendar
- Electoral system
