= List of political parties in Kazakhstan =

This article lists political parties in Kazakhstan. Kazakhstan is a dominant-party state with Ädilet in power. There are seven legal parties in Kazakhstan. Political reforms towards Western-styled multi-party politics and electioneering have made easier for people to join a party. To be a registered political party in Kazakhstan, membership of at least 20,000 persons is required.

== Parties represented in the Kurultai ==
| Party | Abbr. | Leader | Ideology | Kurultai | Political position | Founded |
|---|---|---|---|---|---|---|
| Ädilet; Әділет | | Aibek Dädebai | Pro-Tokayev reformism; Technocracy | 110 / 145 | Big tent | 1999 (Otan); 2006 (Nur Otan); 2021 (Amanat); 7 May 2026 |
| Auyl; Ауыл | | Äli Bektaev | Social democracy; Agrarianism | 10 / 145 | Centre-left | 2000 |
| Respublica; Республика | | Aidarbek Qojanazarov | National liberalism; Social market economy; Open government; Anti-corruption | 9 / 145 | Centre-right | 2022 |
| Aq Jol; Ақ жол | | Azat Peruashev | Liberal conservatism; Economic liberalism; Secularism | 8 / 145 | Centre-right | 2002 |
| Nationwide Social Democratic Party; Жалпыұлттық социал-демократиялық партия Jalpyūlttyq Sotsial-Demokratialyq Partia | JSDP; ЖСДП | Ashat Rahymjanov | Social democracy; Republicanism; Labourism | 8 / 145 | Centre-left | 2006 |

== Extra-parliamentary parties ==
| Name | Abbr. | Leader (s) | Ideology | Political position | Founded |
|---|---|---|---|---|---|
| People's Party of Kazakhstan; Қазақстан Халық Партиясы; Qazaqstan Halyq Partiasy | PPK; КХП; QHP | Ermūhamet Ertısbaev | Social democracy | Centre-left | 2004 (CPPK); 2020 (PPK) |
| «Baytaq» Green Party of Kazakhstan; Қазақстанның «Байтақ» Жасылдар партиясы Qazaqstannyñ «Baytaq» Jasyldar partiasy (Note: According to the last revision of the Kazakh alphabet, «Байтақ» is supposed to be romanised as «Baitaq», however the party officially called itself «Baytaq») | Baytaq; Байтақ; Baytaq | Azamathan Ämırtai | Green politics; Environmentalism | Centre | 2022 |

== Banned or unregistered parties ==
| Name | Abbr. | Leader(s) | Ideology | Political position | Foundation |
|---|---|---|---|---|---|
| Alash National Freedom Party; Алаш ұлттық бостандық партиясы Alaş ūlttyq bostandyq partiasy | Alash | Vacant | Kazakh nationalism; Pan-Turkism | Right-wing | 1990 |
| Amanat; Аманат; Amanat | Amanat | Vacant | Kazakh nationalism; Social conservatism; Economic liberalism | Big tent | 1999 |
| Communist Party of Kazakhstan; Қазақстан Коммунистік Партиясы; Qazaqstan Kommunistık Partiasy | CPK; ҚКП; QKP | Toleubek Makhyzhanov | Communism; Marxism–Leninism | Far-left | 1991 |
| Socialist Party of Kazakhstan; Қазақстанның социалистік партиясы Qazaqstannyñ sotsialistık partiiasy | SPK; ҚCП; QSP | Peter Svoik | | | 1991 |
| Democratic Choice of Kazakhstan; Қазақстанның демократиялық таңдауы Qazaqstannyñ demokratialyq tañdauy | QDT; ҚДТ | Mukhtar Ablyazov | Liberal democracy; Populism; Nationalism; Westernization; Libertarianism | Centre-right | 2001–2005; 2017–present |
| Socialist Movement of Kazakhstan; Қазақстанның Социалистік Қозғалысы; Qazaqstannyñ Sotsialistık Qozğalysy | SMK; ҚCҚ; QSQ | Ainur Kurmanov | Communism; Marxism–Leninism | Far-left | 2002 (SRK); 2011 (SMK) |
| Pirate Party of Kazakhstan; Қазақстан Пираттық Партиясы; Qazaqstan Pirattyq Partiasy | PPK; ҚПП; QPP | Marat Mulkubaev | Pirate politics Copyright reform | Syncretic | 2010 |
| Oyan, Qazaqstan; Оян, Қазақстан | OQ; ОҚ | | Nonviolent resistance Civic rights Anti-authoritarianism | Big tent | 2019 |
| Democratic Party of Kazakhstan; Қазақстанның Демократиялық Партиясы; Qazaqstannyñ Demokratialyq Partiasy | DPK; ҚДП; QDP | Janbolat Mamai | E-democracy | Centre | 2019 |
| Köşe Party; Көше Партиясы; Köşe Partiasy | KP; КП | | Anti-corruption; Anti-authoritarianism; E-democracy | Centre | 2020 |
| El Tıregı; Ел тірегі | ET; ЕТ | Nūrjan Ältaev | National liberalism Social economy | Centre-right to right-wing | 2020 |

== Former parties ==
- Covenant (Amanat)
- True Bright Path (Nağyz Aq Jol)
- Agrarian Party of Kazakhstan (Qazaqstan Agrarlyq Partiasy)
- All Together (Asar)
- Civic Party of Kazakhstan (Qazaqstan Azamattyq Partiasy)
- Party of Patriots (Patriottary partiasy)
- Rukhaniyat Party (Ruhaniat partiasy)
- Democratic Party "Justice" ("Ädılet" Demokratialyq Partiasy)
- Socialist Movement of Kazakhstan (Sotsialistık qozğalys)
- For a Just Kazakhstan (Ädılettı Qazaqstan Üşın)
- Faithful (Adal)

== Historical parties ==
- Alash
- Communist Party of Kazakhstan (Soviet Union)

== See also ==
- Politics of Kazakhstan
- List of political parties by country
