= Oraz Jandosov =

Kazakh politician, economist, and businessman (born 1961)

- Ораз Жандосов

First Deputy Prime Minister of Kazakhstan
- In office 20 February 1998 – 22 January 1999
- Prime Minister: Nurlan Balgimbayev
- Preceded by: Akhmetzhan Yessimov
- Succeeded by: Aleksandr Pavlov

Deputy Prime Minister of Kazakhstan
- In office 20 December 2000 – 21 November 2001
- Prime Minister: Kassym-Jomart Tokayev
- In office 22 January 1999 – 12 October 1999
- Prime Minister: Nurlan Balgimbayev; Kassym-Jomart Tokayev (Acting)

Minister of Finance
- In office 22 January 1999 – 1 October 1999
- President: Nursultan Nazarbayev
- Prime Minister: Nurlan Balgimbayev
- Preceded by: Sauat Mynbayev
- Succeeded by: Majit Esenbaev

3rd Chairman of the National Bank of Kazakhstan
- In office 10 January 1996 – 20 February 1998
- President: Nursultan Nazarbayev
- Preceded by: Daulet Sembaev
- Succeeded by: Kadyrzhan Damitov

Personal details
- Born: 26 October 1961 (age 64) Alma-Ata, Kazakh SSR, Soviet Union
- Party: QDT (2001–2002); Aq Jol (2002–2005); Naghyz Aq Jol (2005−2007)
- Other political affiliations: ÄQÜ (2005)
- Children: 3
- Education: Moscow State University

Oraz Aliuly Jandosov (Kazakh: Ораз Алиұлы Жандосов, Oraz Aliūly Jandosov; born 26 October 1961) is a Kazakh politician and businessman. He was the chairman of the National Bank of Kazakhstan from 1996 to 1998, First Deputy Prime Minister of Kazakhstan from February 1998 to January 1999, Minister of Finance from January to October 1999, Deputy Prime Minister of Kazakhstan from December 2000 to November 2001, assistant to the President of Kazakhstan from January to June 2003, chairman of the Agency of the Republic of Kazakhstan for Regulation of Natural Monopolies and Protection of Competition from June 2003 to July 2004.

== Family and personal life ==
=== Early life and education ===
Jandosov was born in the city of Alma-Ata (now Almaty). In 1983, he graduated with honors from the Faculty of Economics of Moscow State University as a cybernetic economist.

=== Family ===
His father Ali Jandosov (born 1935) was a historian while his mother Klavdiya Pishchulina (born 1934) was a historian-orientalist, candidate of historical sciences, and leading specialist in the history of medieval Kazakhstan. Jandosov is the grandson of Oraz Jandosov (1899–1935) who was a People's Commissar and was executed under Stalin.

He is married and has two daughters and a son.

== Early career ==
From 1987, Jandosov worked as a junior researcher at the Institute of Economics of the Academy of Sciences of the Kazakh SSR. From 1991 to 1992, he served as a consultant, and the head of the department of the apparatus of the Supreme Economic Council under the President of Kazakhstan.

From 1992 to 1994, Jandosov was the First Deputy Chairman of the National Agency for Foreign Investment under the Ministry of Economy, First Deputy Minister of Economy and the chairman of the National Agency for Foreign Investment under the Ministry of Economy.

In January 1994, he became the First Deputy Chairman of the Board of the National Bank of Kazakhstan. Jandosov became its chairman in January 1996 and, while serving in that position, was a member of the Supreme Economic Council under the President of Kazakhstan from February until November 1997.

== Political career ==
On 20 February 1998, Jandosov was appointed as the First Deputy Prime Minister of Kazakhstan and the chairman of the State Committee of the Republic of Kazakhstan on Investments. He served that position until 22 January 1999, when he was appointed as the Minister of Finance. After the government was dismissed on 1 October 1999, Jandosov became the president of KEGOC OJSC company.

On 20 December 2000, he was appointed as the Deputy Prime Minister of Kazakhstan under Tokayev's cabinet. Following his dismissal on 21 November 2001 after becoming a member of the Political Council of the Democratic Choice of Kazakhstan, Jandosov became the chairman of the Board of the Association of Financiers of the Republic of Kazakhstan on 7 December 2001. He served that position until 10 September 2002.

From March 2002, Jandosov was the co-chairman of the Ak Zhol Democratic Party.

On 8 January 2003, by the order of the head of state, Jandosov was appointed Assistant to the President of Kazakhstan. On 9 April 2003, he became the chairman of the board of directors of the state-owned Air Kazakhstan. However, a few days later, Jandosov announced that he could not take this position because the head of Air Kazakhstan Erkin Kaliev being his relative.

On 20 June 2003, he was appointed as the chairman of the Agency of the Republic of Kazakhstan on Regulation of Natural Monopolies and Protection of Competition as part of the Council for Economic Policy. He was dismissed from the position on 7 July 2004.

In October 2004, Jandosov became a member the Coordinating Council of the Democratic Forces of Kazakhstan. In March 2005, he became a member of the Presidium of the For a Just Kazakhstan political bloc. On 29 April 2005, the Nagyz Ak Zhol (literally True Bright Path) party was formed, headed by four co-chairs which were Jandosov himself, Bulat Abilov, Tulegen Zhukeyev and Altynbek Sarsenbayuly. The party applied for registration to the Ministry of Justice, but by the order of the Registration Service Committee of the Ministry of Justice dated 22 August 2005, it was denied registration. However, only on 17 March 2006, after the decision of the Supreme Court, the party was registered with the justice authorities.

In September 2005, Jandosov became the deputy head of the campaign headquarters for support of Zharmakhan Tuyakbay in the 2005 Kazakh presidential election.

== Other activities ==
On 23 December 2008, Jandosov was appointed as the chairman of the Board of Trustees of the Association of Economists of Kazakhstan. In 2016 and 2019, he served as an independent director and member of the Board of Directors of the National Management Holding KazAgro JSC. Jandosov is currently a member of a Board of Directors of the Damu Entrepreneurship Development Fund from June 2018, independent director of Kazpost JSC from September 2018, member of the National Council of Public Confidence under the President of Kazakhstan from July 2019 and member of the Center for Analysis of Monitoring of Socio-Economic Reforms under the President from February 2020.
