= Coalition of Democratic Forces (Kazakhstan) =

Coalition of Democratic Forces Демократиялық күштер коалициясы Demokratialyq küşter koalitsiasy
- Abbreviation: DKK (Kazakh); KDS (Russian)
- Founders: Bulat Abilov; Nūrjan Ältaev
- Founded: 5 September 2022
- Ideology: Anti-authoritarianism; Liberal democracy Civic nationalism Anti-corruption
- Member parties: Bizdin Tandau; El Tıregı; Namys; JSDP; Halyq Biligi; Alğa Qazaqstan; Jer Qorgany

The Coalition of Democratic Forces (Kazakh: Демократиялық күштер коалициясы, romanized: Demokratialyq küşter koalitsiasy, DKK; Russian: Коалиция демократических сил, romanized: Koaliciya demokraticheskikh sil, KDS) is a Kazakh opposition political alliance that was founded on 5 September 2022.

The DKK opposed 2022 snap presidential elections and instead promised to organise protest rallies, but in parallel to preparing a single candidate for the presidential race in case the elections would not be postponed.

== History ==
Following President Kassym-Jomart Tokayev's 2022 State of the Nation Address where he announced his candidacy for the snap presidential elections and a constitutional amendment in extending the presidential term to seven years while making it non-renewable, the Coalition of Democratic Forces (DKK) was subsequently formed in response and held its first conference on 5 September 2022 in Almaty. From there, the DKK expressed its opposition in holding of snap elections as well as proposed seven-year presidential term law and instead called for the postponement of the vote to the originally scheduled date in 2024. It was attended by many opposition politicians and civil activists: Rysbek SärsenbaI, Erlan Qaliev, Bulat Abilov, Nūrjan Ältaev, Mūqtar Taijan, Güjan Ergalieva and others.

On 12 September, former Nationwide Social Democratic Party chairman Ermurat Bapi called rumours about his nomination as a presidential candidate from DKK. According to him, first they must achieve political reforms and changes in the electoral law, and then choose candidates for the elections.

The DKK on 14 September attempted to hold a demonstration in Almaty against the holding of snap presidential elections but were barred from doing so by the Almaty City Administration.
