= Ak Zhol =

Ak Zhol may refer to:

- Ak Jol, a political party in Kyrgyzstan
- Aq Jol, a political party in Kazakhstan
- FC Ak-Zhol, a Kyrgyz football club based in Aravan, Kyrgyzstan
- Naghyz Aq Jol, a former political party in Kazakhstan
