= Bright Path (disambiguation) =

Bright Path is the contraction of the Native American name of the athlete Jim Thorpe.

Bright Path may also refer to:

- Bright Path (1940 film), a Soviet musical comedy best known as Tanya
- Nurly Zhol, a Kazakhstani economic stimulus plan
- Democratic Party of Kazakhstan Bright Path, or Aq Jol, a political party
- True Bright Path, or Nağyz Aq Jol, a former Kazakh political party

== See also ==
- Shining Path
