= Democratic Choice of Kazakhstan =

Political party in Kazakhstan

Democratic Choice of Kazakhstan Қазақстанның демократиялық таңдауы
- Abbreviation: QDT (Kazakh); ДВК (Russian)
- Leader: Mukhtar Ablyazov
- Founded: 18 November 2001; 20 April 2017 (re-establishment)
- Headquarters: Kyiv, Ukraine
- Ideology: Liberalism; Populism; Civic nationalism Decentralization; Parliamentarism; Liberal democracy E-democracy; Civil libertarianism Pro-Europeanism
- Political position: Centre-right
- Colors: Blue

Website
- sites.google.com/view/kazdvk/

Democratic Choice of Kazakhstan (Kazakh: Қазақстанның демократиялық таңдауы, romanized: Qazaqstannyñ demokratialyq tañdauy, QDT; Russian: Демократический выбор Казахстана, ДВК, romanized: Demokraticheskiy vybor Kazakhstana, DVK) is a political party in Kazakhstan. It was founded by Mukhtar Ablyazov, a businessman and a former minister and Galymzhan Zhakiyanov, who was the akim of Pavlodar Region. The QDT embraced a number of influential politicians and wealthy businessmen of the country who grew disillusioned with the inner circles of President Nazarbayev. The movement adopted a strong anti-Nazarbayev stance and criticized the corruption and nepotism of the president and his clique. The party seeks to peacefully topple the current Kazakh regime and to transform Kazakhstan into a parliamentary republic.

== History ==
=== Origin (1998–2001) ===
From 1998 to 1999, Mukhtar Ablyazov served as Minister of Energy, Industry and Trade. Numerous reforms under him were proposed which was a program to diversify the country's economy, transferring part of the power to the regions, and introducing market principles for tariff formation. However, over time, President Nazarbayev began to oppose Ablyazov's work. As a result, in 1999, Ablyazov resigned from his position claiming that the policies of the Nazarbayev's regime make the systemic reforms impossible.

In early 2000, Ablyazov and Galymzhan Zhakiyanov decided to create a movement that would advocate for reforms and seek to take power by democratic and legal methods. Originally, the movement had no plans in overthrowing the government.

=== Foundation (2001–2002) ===
The Democratic Choice of Kazakhstan was founded as a result of a split within the ruling elite that erupted into a full-scale crisis in November 2001. What the roots of the crisis were is not clear, yet it appears that conflicts of interest between a group of reformist bureaucrats, including the akim of the Pavlodar region, Zhakiyanov; the deputy premier, Oraz Jandosov; a fugitive banker, Ablyazov; and President Nazarbayev's son-in-law, Rakhat Aliyev, prompted Ablyazov to declare the establishment of a pro-business, pro-reform movement called Democratic Choice of Kazakhstan. Founders of the movement included deputy defense minister Zhannat Yertlesova, deputy finance minister Kairat Kelimbetov, leading businessmen, Nurzhan Subkhanberdin as head of the Kazkommertz bank, and Bulat Abilov.

==== Response by authorities ====
The prime minister of Kazakhstan, Kassym-Jomart Tokayev, harshly criticized the movement and asked the founders to resign from their government posts. The crisis was contained as a result of the intervention of Nazarbayev. Tokayev was reassigned as the foreign minister, while Rakhat Aliyev was transferred to Vienna as ambassador. Zhakiyanov, Zhandosov, Ablyazov, and others were fired from their government positions.

On 4 January 2002, a criminal case was opened against Zhakiyanov on charges of authorial abuse. A criminal case on the charges of financial fraud and political abuse was held against Ablyazov where on 27 March 2002, he was arrested. International observers from Human Rights Watch, Amnesty International, the European Parliament and the US Department of State noted that the trial in the Ablyazov case took place with multiple procedural violations, insufficient evidence and inconsistent witness statements, which indicated the political nature of a criminal prosecution.

While serving in prison, Ablyazov was repeatedly beaten and subjected to psychological pressure. On 13 May 2003, President Nursultan Nazarbayev signed a decree to pardon Ablyazov and to release him from further serving his sentence in prison. The president's decision was facilitated by wide publicity that Ablyazov's case received among the international community and the resolution of the European Parliament in his support. Ablyazov, after his release, publicly stated that he ceased his cooperation with the movement and to be engaged in politics, but he secretly continued to support the movement.

=== Decline and disbandment (2002–2005) ===
QDT became split in the spring of 2002, as a group of moderate members, including Oraz Zhandosov, Bulat Abilov, and Alikhan Baimenov, established the center-right Ak Zhol Party. Later, Ak Zhol also gave birth to another party, Naghyz Ak Zhol, led by Bulat Abilov, Altynbek Sarsenbaev, and Oraz Zhandosov. QDT leaders have been trying to reregister the party with a new name: Alga! Kazakhstan, under the leadership of Marat Zhylanbayev. Despite repeated attempts, authorities did not register QDT as a political movement. A party, Democratic Choice of Kazakhstan, was founded out of the movement and participated in the 2004 parliamentary elections in a bloc with Serikbolsyn Abdildin’s Communist Party. The bloc failed to win any seats in the parliament.

The QDT was disbanded in February 2005 before the presidential elections. But the party-led coalition of opposition forces, For a Just Kazakhstan, nominated former deputy chair of the Otan party, Zharmakhan Tuyakbay, as a presidential candidate in the elections held on 4 December 2005. Tuyakbay received 6% of the votes.

=== Reestablishment (2017–present) ===
On 20 April 2017, Ablyazov announced the recreation of the QDT movement. The party claimed to have gained over 80,000 members from social media. It periodically holds protests throughout Kazakhstan to which the authorities had tried to repress. Some of the 2019 Kazakh protests are attributed to inspiration by QDT. During the 2019 Kazakh presidential election, around 5,000 demonstrators, journalists and activists were detained by the police. The event was the first time that Kazakhstan faced protests during the elections. The movement also supports anti-China protests which had broken out in August 2019. On 5 January 2022, leader Mukhtar Ablyazov urged citizens to protest against the Nazarbaev regime, resulting mass protests across the country
