= Zhakiyanov =

Zhakiyanov or Jaqianov (Kazakh: Жақиянов, literally meaning "long-liver") is a Kazakh masculine surname. Its feminine counterpart is Zhakiyanova.

Notable persons with the name Zhakiyanov include:

- Galymzhan Zhakiyanov (born 1963), Kazakh businessman and politician
- Zhanat Zhakiyanov (born 1983), Kazakh former boxer
