= Galymzhan Zhakiyanov =

Kazakh businessman and politician (born 1963)

- Ғалымжан Жақиянов
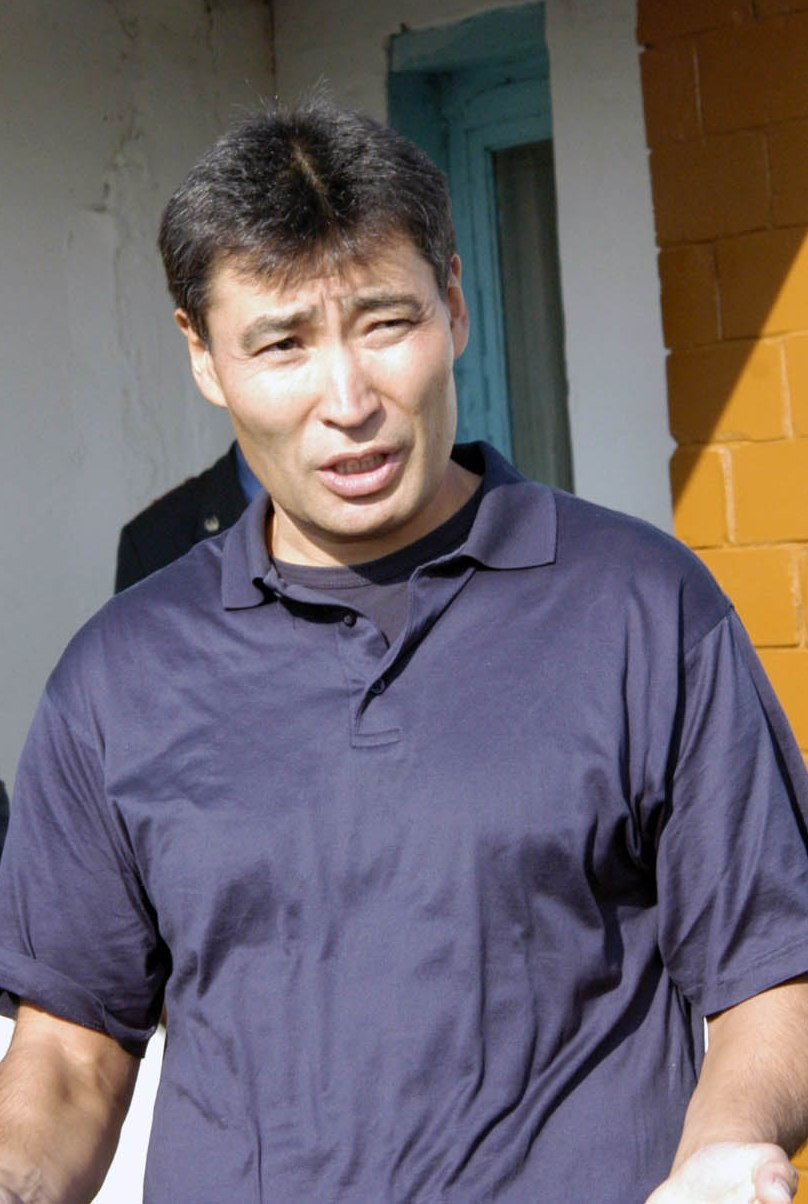

Äkim of Pavlodar Region
- In office 19 December 1997 – 21 November 2001
- Preceded by: Daniyal Akhmetov
- Succeeded by: Daniyal Akhmetov

Akim of Semey Region
- In office 17 June 1994 – 10 March 1997
- Preceded by: Vyacheslav Chernov
- Succeeded by: Vitaly Mette

Chairman of Democratic Choice
- In office 11 December 2004 – 6 January 2005
- Preceded by: Office established
- Succeeded by: Office disestablished

Personal details
- Born: 8 May 1963 (age 63) Kuigan, Kazakh SSR, Soviet Union
- Party: Democratic Choice (2001–2005)
- Spouse: Karlygash Zhakiyanova
- Children: Two sons
- Occupation: Politician and businessman

Galymzhan Zhakiyanov (Kazakh: Ғалымжан Баділжанұлы Жақиянов, Ğalymjan Badıljanūly Jaqiianov; born 8 May 1963) is a Kazakh businessman and politician. He owned several companies in Kazakhstan and has served as the akim of Semipalatinsk Region and Pavlodar Region.

He was a founding member of Democratic Choice of Kazakhstan, an opposition party to Nursultan Nazarbayev's authoritarian rule in Kazkahstan. He was imprisoned from 2002 to 2006 on charges of abuse of office.

== Early life and career ==
Zhakiyanov was born in 1963 in the village of Kuigan. He graduated from Moscow Bauman Moscow State Technical University in 1986 with a degree in Mechanical Engineering. Zhakiyanov worked for a time as a manager at a Soviet military plant. Right before the breakup of the Soviet Union, he started with other partners own business operating a coal and natural resources company in Kazakhstan.

== Political career ==
In 1994, Zhakiyanov was appointed as the head of Semipalatinsk Province in the newly independent Kazakhstan. From 1997 until the end of 2001, he served as the akim of the Pavlodar Region.

In 2001, Zhakiyanov along with Oraz Jandosov, Deputy Prime Minister, Mukhtar Ablyazov, former Minister of Industry, Nurzhan Subhanberdin, the president of Kazkommerzbank, Tolen Tokhtassynov, the member of Parlament RK, and other top politicians and businessmen of the Republic founded and later was elected as the chairman of the Democratic Choice of Kazakhstan (QDT) while being in prison. It was a political movement which advocated democratic reform in Kazakhstan, including multi-party political campaigning, free and open elections, and an independent media and judiciary. The QDT opposed the authoritarian politics of President Nursultan Nazarbaev, and as organizers of opposition to his regime, Zhakiyanov and his supporters were subjected to repression for their political convictions.

In 2002, Zhakiyanov was arrested and sentenced to seven years in prison for abuse of office. Many international human rights organizations and governments, including those of the United States and the European Union, declared the charges against Zhakiyanov to be politically motivated and recognized him as a political prisoner. He was released from prison in 2006. The same year, Zhakiyanov became chairman of the Civil Society Foundation.

In 2012, he along with his family immigrated to the United States, and settled in Boston and entered the Massachusetts Institute of Technology under the MBA program at the Sloane School.

In 2013, Zhakiyanov announced that he was no longer involved in politics or private business.

== Business ==
In 1990, he established with Akezhan Kazhegeldin, future PM, the Semey Corp. and became its president.

In 2008, he started new business ventures in China and Mongolia related to coal and iron-ore mining. G. Zhakiyanov is now the chairman of the board of two companies: MECAP Ltd., and ALGT Ltd.

== Personal life ==
Zhakiyanov married Karlygash Zhakiyanova in 1984. Karlygash worked as a school teacher and as a manager in non-government organizations. In 2002, Zhakiyanova participated in the political movement QDT, founded the human rights organization Pravosoznanie which contributed significantly to the cause of releasing political prisoners in Kazakhstan. Currently, she assists her husband with his business activities in China.

Zhakiyanov has two sons who are Berik and Erzhan. Berik (born 1985) graduated from the University of Texas in 2008 and now studying at Harvard. Erzhan (born 1993) studied at the Massachusetts Institute of Technology and graduated in 2016.
