= Ermurat Bapi =

Kazakh politician and journalist (born 1959)

MP Ermurat Bäpi
- Ермұрат Бәпи
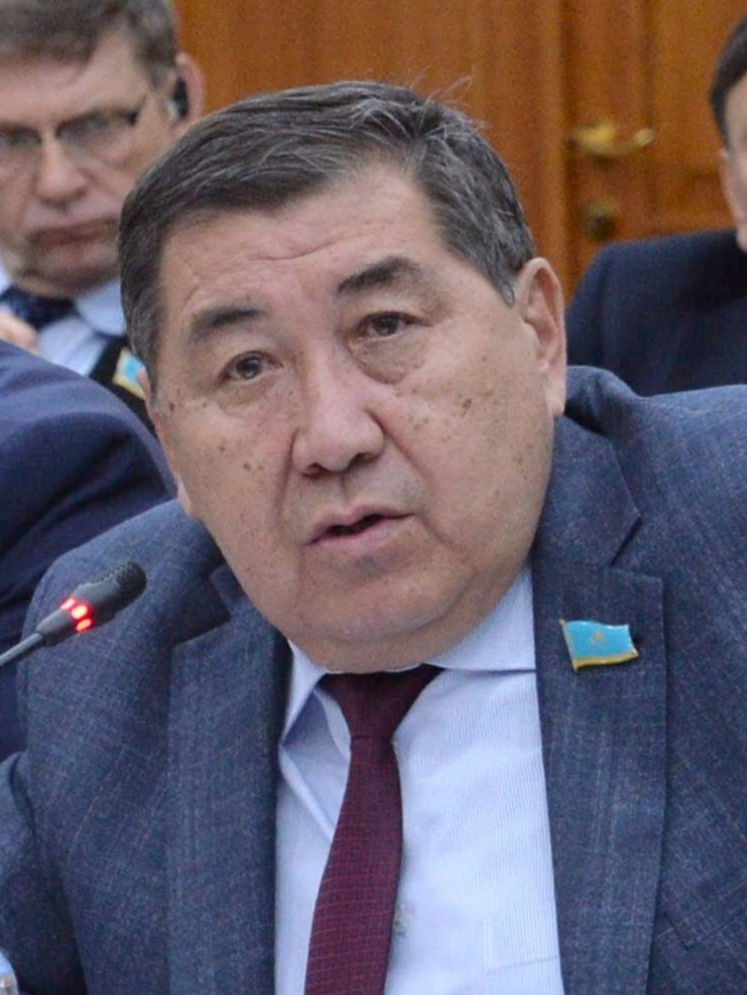
- Bäpi in 2023

Member of the Mäjilis
- In office 19 March 2023 – 1 July 2026
- Preceded by: Constituency reestablished; Sergey Kiselev (2004)
- Constituency: Almaty, No. 3

Chairman of Nationwide Social Democratic Party
- In office 26 April 2019 – 6 September 2019
- Preceded by: Zharmakhan Tuyakbay
- Succeeded by: Ashat Rahymjanov

Personal details
- Born: 7 March 1959 (age 67) Qarabulaq, Kazakh SSR, Soviet Union
- Party: Independent (2019-Present) JSDP (2006–2019); Republican People's Party (1998–2001)
- Other political affiliations: ÄQÜ (2005)
- Spouse: Qarlygash Bisalieva
- Children: 3
- Education: Al-Farabi Kazakh National University

Ermūrat Seiıtqazyūly Bäpi (Note: Kazakh: Ермұрат Сейітқазыұлы Бәпи, IPA: [jermʊrɑ́t sʲejɘ̆tqʰɑzəʊɫə́ b̥æpʰí]; Russian: Ермурат Сейтказинович Бапиев, romanized: Jermurat Sejtkazinovič Bapijev, pronounced [jermʊˈrat sʲejtkɐˈzʲinəvʲɪtɕ bəˈpʲijef]; English: /ˌɛərmʊˈræt ˈbæpi/ AIR-muur-AT BAP-ee) (born 7 March 1959) is a Kazakh politician and journalist who was Chairman of the Nationwide Social Democratic Party (JSDP) from 26 April to 6 September 2019. He is the editor of the independent newspaper Tasjargan («Тасжарған» — lit. 'Saxifraga').

== Biography ==
=== Early life and education ===
Bäpi was born in the village of Qarabulaq, in the East Kazakhstan Region. In 1976, he was a correspondent of the Zaisan Regional newspaper. From 1977 to 1980, he served in the Soviet Navy of Kamchatka Submarine Flotilla of the Red Banner Pacific Fleet, where he was a petty officer in reserve. In 1985, Bäpi graduated from the Al-Farabi Kazakh National University with a degree in journalism.

=== Career ===
After graduating, Bäpi worked as correspondent, senior correspondent, head of the Department of the East Kazakhstan regional newspaper Kommunism tui (Didar), correspondent, senior correspondent of the newspaper Socialist Kazakhstan and Egemen Qazaqstan. From 1992 to 1995, he was the deputy general director of Qazaq Radiosy, head of the editorial office of Dustom and commercial programs Taikazan. From 1995, Bäpi worked as the deputy head of the Press Service of the Government of Kazakhstan until he became the advisor to the President of the Union of Industrialists and Entrepreneurs of Kazakhstan Akezhan Kazhegeldin in 1998. He then was the head of the publishing project DAT and the chief editor of the newspaper SolDAT.

In April 2009, Bäpi was jailed for 5 days after not paying large amounts of compensation to deputy Romin Madinov for allegedly libeling him. Bäpi accused the charges of being politically motivated.

Bäpi served as member of the Central Council of the movement For a Just Kazakhstan. He ran in the 2016 Kazakh legislative election in the Nationwide Social Democratic Party (JSDP) party list which won no seats in the Mazhilis.

On 22 April 2019, the JSDP nominated Bäpi as candidate for the 2019 presidential elections. However on 26 April, after Zharmakhan Tuyakbay stepped down from the post of the Chairman of JSDP, Bäpi was unanimously chosen by the party's delegates to succeed Tuyakbay's role. It was also announced that the JSDP would refuse to participate in the election with Bäpi calling for boycott.

On 6 September 2019, at the 15th Extraordinary Congress of the JSDP, the party delegates expressed a vote of no confidence in Bäpi, and as a result, he was removed the post as the party's chairman. The reason for removal was due to disapproval by the party members such as his trip to Paris in May, where Bäpi met former PM Akezhan Kazhegeldin and the former Äkim of Atyrau Region Bergei Rysqaliev, who have been living in exile and convicted at home on charges in corruption while others saw no Bäpi's ability to attract new members to the party. He was replaced by Ashat Raqymjanov as the party's new chairman. Former Chairman Tuyakbay called the party's move as "dirty and dastardly coup." On 8 October 2019, Bäpi claimed that Rysqaliev was a "rightful owner" of the party.
