= Communist Party of Kazakhstan =

Banned political party in Kazakhstan

Communist Party of Kazakhstan Қазақстан Коммунистік партиясы (Kazakh) Коммунистическая партия Казахстана (Russian)
- Abbreviation: KPK
- First Secretary of the Central Committee: Makhyzhanov Toleubek Satylkhanovich
- Founded: 16 October 1991 (34 years, 343 days)
- Banned: 4 September 2015 (11 years, 20 days)
- Preceded by: Communist Party of Kazakhstan (Soviet Union)
- Ideology: Communism; Marxism–Leninism; Left-conservatism; Soviet patriotism
- Political position: Far-left
- Continental affiliation: UCP–CPSU
- International affiliation: IMCWP

Website
- comparty.kz (archived)

The Communist Party of Kazakhstan (Kazakh: Қазақстан Коммунистік партиясы, Qazaqstan Kommunistık partiasy) is a banned Marxist–Leninist political party in Kazakhstan.

== History ==
=== Origin ===
The Communist Party of Kazakhstan was founded in 1936, when Kazakhstan was granted Union Republic status within the Soviet Union. The Communist Party of Kazakhstan had been a branch of the Communist Party of the Soviet Union (CPSU) until the dissolution of the Soviet Union.

=== Post-Soviet restructuring ===
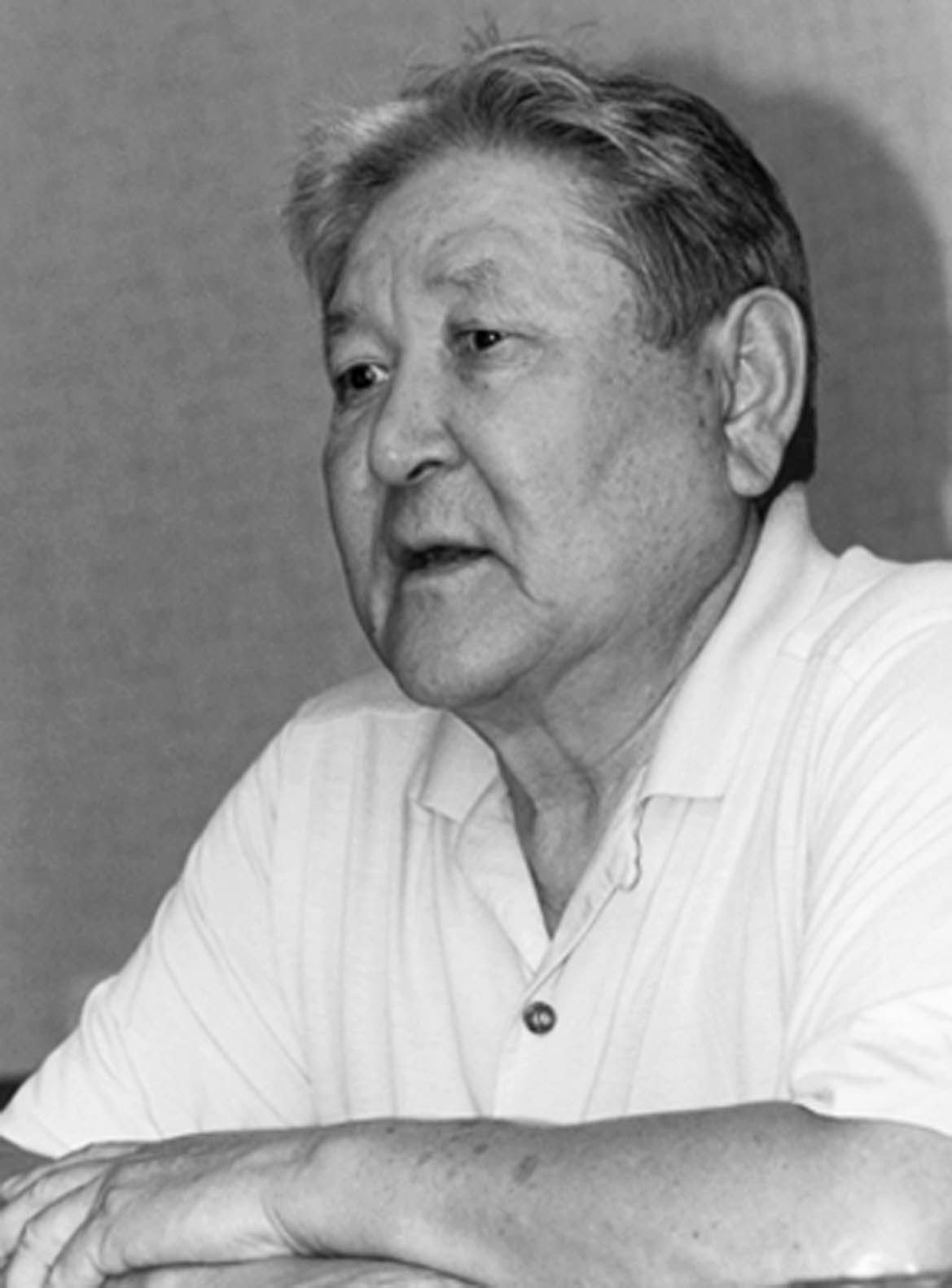
Serıkbolsyn Äbdıldin, party leader from 1996 to 2010

The 18th Congress of the Communist Party of Kazakhstan took a decision to rename the Communist Party as the Socialist Party and split from CPSU. Nursultan Nazarbayev, the party chairman, resigned when he became the first President of Kazakhstan in 1991. Dissatisfied members of the old Communist Party recreated the Communist Party of Kazakhstan in October 1991 at the 19th Congress of the party. The KPK was officially registered on 27 August 1998. The Communist Party of Kazakhstan had a well-established party structure with offices in all of the oblasts. The KPK was estimated to have around 70,000 members. KPK largely appealed to the above-middle age segment of the population especially in urban areas nostalgic for the Soviet Union. The first leader of the KPK was economist Serikbolsyn Abdildin.

In the mid 1990s, the KPK participated in the opposition coalition movements Azamat and Pokolenie ("Generation"). In 1996, KPK initiated the unregistered "National-Patriotic Movement-Republic". In February 1998, it joined the People’s Front of Kazakhstan.

The party became split on 13 April 2004, when a group led by Vladislav Kosarev accused party First Secretary Serıkbolsyn Äbdıldin of accepting money from questionable sources. The splinter party, the Communist People's Party of Kazakhstan, initially failed to meet the 50,000 membership requirement to be officially registered.

At the last legislative elections, 19 September and 3 October 2004, an alliance of the Communist Party of Kazakhstan and the Democratic Choice of Kazakhstan won 3.4% of the popular vote and no seats. At 4 December 2005 presidential elections, the Communist Party of Kazakhstan, the Democratic Choice of Kazakhstan and the Naghyz Ak Zhol formed a coalition movement called For a Just Kazakhstan and supported Zharmakhan Tuyakbay as its presidential candidate.

Party activities were suspended in 2012 by a regional court because of alleged cooperation with the banned party Alga! which had links to fugitive politician Mukhtar Ablyazov.

The party was banned in 2015 by the Almaty city court because the number of party members was below the legal minimum number of 40,000. The sentence was denounced as politically motivated by party leaders, and was condemned by the Communist Party of Greece (KKE), the Russian Communist Workers' Party (RKRP) and the Communist Party in Turkey (KP). The KKE delegation in the European Parliament denounced the ban to the High Representative of the Union for Foreign Affairs and Security Policy Federica Mogherini, asking her opinion about the ban of the party and the restrictions to political activities in Kazakhstan.

However, the legality of the sentence was defended by the People's Party of Kazakhstan (KNPK), whose leadership accused the QHP of ignorance of the law. Despite having later protested against the ban on the Communist Party of Ukraine (KPU), the Communist Party of the Russian Federation (KPRF) released no official statement on the matter.

== First Secretaries ==
1. Leonid Korolkov (1992 – October 1994)
2. Baidabek Tolepbayev (October 1994 – April 1996)
3. Serikbolsyn Abdildin (April 1996 – 17 April 2010)
4. Gaziz Aldamzharov (17 April 2010 – 4 September 2015)
5. Makhyzhanov Toleubek Satylkhanovich (present)

== See also ==
- Alma-Ata Regional Committee of the Communist Party of Kazakhstan
