= Mels Eleusizov =

Kazakh politician and ecologist (born 1950)

- Мэлс Елеусізов
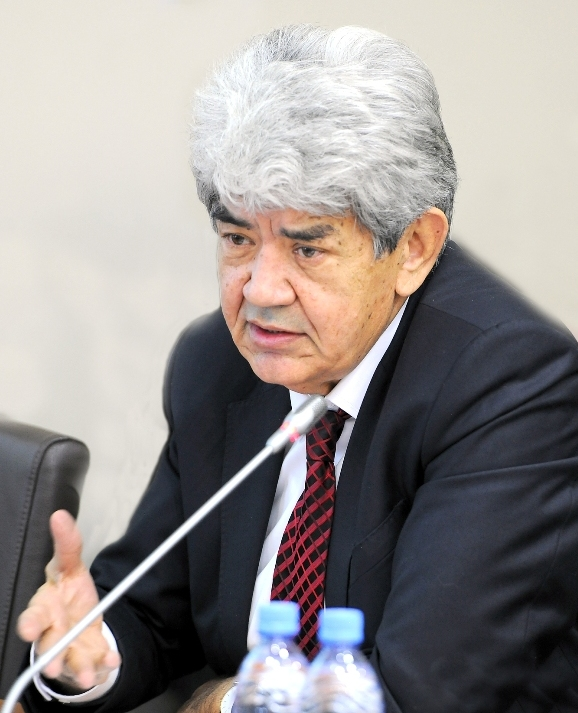
- Eleusizov in 2016

Chairman of Tabigat
- Incumbent
- Assumed office December 1989
- Preceded by: Office established

Personal details
- Born: 20 March 1950 (age 76) Alma-Ata, Kazakh SSR, Soviet Union
- Children: Aijan, Kamila, Igor, Timur
- Education: Al-Farabi Kazakh National University

Military service
- Allegiance: Soviet Union
- Branch/service: Soviet Army
- Years of service: 1968–1970
- Rank: Captain

Mels Hamzauly Eleusizov (Kazakh: Мэлс Хамзаұлы Елеусізов, Mels Hamzaūly Eleusızov; born 20 March 1950) is a Kazakh political activist and ecologist who is the Chairman of Tabigat Ecological Union. He campaigned in many of Kazakhstan's elections, mostly notably in the 2005 and 2011 presidential elections.

== Biography ==
=== Early life and education ===
Eleusizov was born in 1950 in the city of Alma-Ata (now Almaty). From 1968 to 1970, he served in the Soviet Army as a reserve captain before becoming a flight attendant, and Secretary of the Komsomol Committee of the Alma-Ata United Air Squadron. From 1975, Eleusizov worked in ARO-2, Jetysu shoe association, signaling and communication distance of the Alma-Ata railway while being the Head of the operational Komsomol Detachment of the Oktyabrsky District.

In 1981, he graduated from the Al-Farabi Kazakh National University with a degree in law. In 1982, Eleusizov became the Deputy General Director of the Zerger Production Association. In 1984, he was the chief engineer of the military state farm of the Alma-Ata Central Asian military district until he became the Deputy Director of the Kazgiprovodkhoz Institute.

=== Political career ===
In December 1989, Eleusizov became the Chairman of the Tabigat Ecological Union of Associations and Enterprises of Kazakhstan. Since 1993, he has repeatedly spoken about plans to transform his eco-union into a political party, but so far his attempts have been unsuccessful.

He has campaigned many years for legislative and presidential elections. In the 2005 election, Eleusizov won 0.28% of the vote. Then in 2011 with 1.15% of the vote, where he himself admitted voting for incumbent president Nursultan Nazarbayev.

On 12 March 2015, Eleusizov announced his candidacy in the 2015 Kazakh presidential election, however, days later on 17 March, he dropped out of the race citing lack of funds and time for his campaign.
