= Bizdin Tandau =

Our Choice Біздің Таңдау
- Leader: Bulat Abilov
- Founder: Bulat Abilov
- Founded: 16 May 2022
- National affiliation: Coalition of Democratic Forces (2022–present)

Bizdin Tandau (Kazakh: Біздің Таңдау, romanized: Bızdıñ Tañdau; lit. 'Our Choice') is an unregistered Kazakh opposition party founded on 16 May 2022 by businessman Bulat Abilov.

== History ==
Abilov announced the creation of his party in an interview in March 2022. According to him, one of its goals should be the return of assets illegally privatized in the 1990s. In a conversation with Vlast, he noted that he was now completing the formation of an initiative group, and together with it he was working on the program and charter of the party.

On 16 May 2022, the creation of the party was officially announced. According to Abilov, the Bizdin Tandau initiative group included Olzhas Mukhamedi, Bella Orynbetova, Rysbek Sarsenbayuly, Bakhyt Zhumakaeva, Iskander Beisembetov and a number of other famous people.

At the conference on 26 August, the party called for not celebrating the Constitution Day of Kazakhstan. Members of Bizdin Tandau believe that the constitution helped establish Nazarbayev's personal power and protected his relatives from being held accountable for alleged violations in a country where civil liberties were not respected. The conference participants called on President Kassym-Jomart Tokayev to carry out a constitutional reform.

At the beginning of September, Abilov took part in the conference of the Coalition of Democratic Forces.

== Party program ==
According to Bulat Abilov, the main goal of the party will be the transformation of Kazakhstan from a super-presidential into a parliamentary republic.

The party is in favor of renaming Kazakhstan to Qazaqia and the capital of Astana to Alash-Orda.

Abilov advocates the liquidation of the Samruk-Kazyna fund, as well as the withdrawal of Kazakhstan from the Eurasian Economic Union and the Collective Security Treaty Organization.

Abilov also stressed that an important goal for the party would be to build an economy based on the principles of free enterprise, inviolability of private property and competition.
