= Constituency No. 3 (Kazakhstan) =

- Kazakh: №3 сайлау округі Russian: Избирательный округ №3
- Single-mandate constituency for the Mäjilis
- District: Alatau and Auezov
- City: Almaty

Current constituency
- Created: 2004; 2022 (re-established)
- Seats: 1
- Party: Independent
- Deputy: Ermurat Bapi
- Elected: 2023

The Constituency No. 3 (Kazakh: №3 сайлау округі, romanized: №3 sailau okrugı; Russian: Избирательный округ №3) is a single-mandate territorial constituency in Kazakhstan, represented in the lower chamber Mäjilis of the Parliament. It is located in the city of Almaty and includes the districts of Alatau and Auezov.

The constituency was originally formed for the 2004 legislative election and existed until being abolished in 2007. However, it has been reestablished in 2022 and is currently represented by deputy Ermurat Bapi (Independent) since March 2023.

== Geography ==
The Constituency No. 3 is situated in the northwestern part of Almaty and includes the city districts of Alatau and Auezov. It shares borders with No. 12 (Almaty Region) to the northwest, along with No. 4 (Almaty) to the southeast and No. 5 (Almaty) to the southwest.

== History ==
The Constituency No. 3 was formed for the 2004 legislative election as a result of redistribution within the boundaries of Almaty, and Sergey Kiselev served as deputy from the constituency. From there, the electoral district continued to exist until its dissolution following the 2007 constitutional amendment, which led to the abolition of all constituencies as part of the transition from a mixed-member majoritarian representation to a fully party-list proportional representation system. The change affected the composition of all seats in the lower chamber Mäjilis of the Kazakh Parliament beginning with the 2007 legislative election.

On 24 December 2022, the Constituency No. 3 was reestablished by the Central Election Commission, which came into effect on 1 January 2023 as a result of the 2022 amendment. The adoption of this amendment marked the reintroduction of a mixed electoral system for electing Mäjilis deputies, with the use of numbered constituencies being reinstated for the first time since 2004. It made its debut in the 2023 legislative election, with Ermurat Bapi becoming the elected representative of the constituency.

== Members ==
Election	Member	Party	%
2004	Sergey Kiselev	Asar	67.4
2007	Defunct constituency (Nationwide PR)		
2012	Defunct constituency (Nationwide PR)		
2016	Defunct constituency (Nationwide PR)		
2021	Defunct constituency (Nationwide PR)		
2023	Ermurat Bapi	Independent	27.9

== Election results ==
=== 2023 ===
Candidate	Party	Votes	%
Ermurat Bapi	Independent	23,690	27.93
Inga Imanbai	Independent (QDP)	6,798	8.01
Aqböpe Äbilqasymova	Independent	2,826	3.33
Mira Ajahmetova	Independent	2,309	2.72
Rüstem Amangeldi	Independent	2,041	2.41
Talğat Tileşev	Independent	1,919	2.26
Dana Meirbekova	Independent	1,636	1.93
Dinmuhamed Qamatai	Independent	1,560	1.84
Aqmaral Şatemirqyzy	Independent	1,500	1.77
Aibek Eleubai	Independent	1,453	1.71
Others		24,948	29.41
Against all		14,147	16.68
Total		84,827	100.00
Valid votes		84,827	88.44
Invalid/blank votes		11,088	11.56
Total votes		95,915	100.00
Independent gain			
Source: CEC
