= Jer Qorgany =

Defenders of Land Jer Qorgany
- Leader: Mūqtar Taijan
- Founder: Mūqtar Taijan
- Founded: 16 March 2022
- Ideology: Land reform Economic nationalism Anti-EAEU
- National affiliation: Coalition of Democratic Forces (2022–present)
- Colours: Brown

Website
- jerqorgany.kz

Jer Qorgany (Kazakh: Жер Қорғаны, romanized: Jer Qorğanı; lit. 'Defenders of Land') is an unregistered Kazakh opposition party founded on 16 March 2022 by public figure Mūqtar Taijan.

== History ==
On 16 March 2022, opposition public figure Mūqtar Taijan announced his intention to create his own political party. According to Taizhan, the new political force will compete with Nur Otan and may come to power in the next parliamentary election. Earlier in the day, Kazakh President Kassym-Jomart Tokayev announced a simplification of the procedure for registering parties. Taijan expressed confidence that his party would defeat the ruling party and enter parliament in the first elections.

On 31 August, the economic program of the party was published: the party called for leaving the Eurasian Customs Union and the Eurasian Economic Union, as well as dissolving the Samruk-Kazyna and Bayterek holdings.

On 5 September, Taijan took part in the founding conference of the Coalition of Democratic Forces of Kazakhstan.

== Party program ==
The party's program is completely focused on land reforms. Among the demands of the party are a ban on the sale of agricultural land to private ownership by citizens of Kazakhstan, a strict ban on the sale / lease of land to foreigners, the establishment of an open land cadastre, the return of irrationally used lands to state ownership, a ban on sublease, tougher requirements for the use of land by citizens of Kazakhstan, tougher requirements for obtaining citizenship of the Republic of Kazakhstan and more.
