= Nationwide Social Democratic Party =

Nationwide Social Democratic Party: Жалпыұлттық социал-демократиялық партия (Kazakh); Общенациональная социал-демократическая партия (Russian)
- Abbreviation: JSDP (Kazakh); OSDP (Russian)
- Chairman: Ashat Rahymjanov
- Founder: Zharmakhan Tuyakbay
- Founded: 10 September 2006; 19 years ago
- Registered: 25 January 2007
- Merger of: Naghyz Ak Zhol; Azat Party
- Ideology: Social democracy; Republicanism; Parliamentarism; Labourism
- Political position: Centre-left
- International affiliation: Socialist International (since 2016)
- Colours: Blue
- Kurultai: 8 / 145
- Äkims: 1 / 730

Website
- www.osdp.kz

The Nationwide Social Democratic Party (Kazakh: Жалпыұлттық социал-демократиялық партия, romanized: Jalpyūlttyq Sotsial-Demokratialyq Partia, JSDP; Russian: Общенациональная социал-демократическая партия, OSDP), sometimes translated as the All-National Social Democratic Party, is a political party in Kazakhstan led by Ashat Raqymjanov. It was founded by a former presidential candidate and the Mazhilis Chairman, Zharmakhan Tuyakbay. The party was registered by the authorities on 25 January 2007, aiming to become a member of the Socialist International (SI) which happened in 2012 as the JSDP became consultative member, and then a full member in 2016.

== History ==
On 7 August 2006, on the basis of the For a Just Kazakhstan (EQU) alliance, a meeting of the Initiative Group of Citizens on the creation of the Nationwide Social Democratic Party (JSDP) was held, which made a decision on the formation of the Republican Organizing Committee. From there, main program goals and objectives of the newly created party were discussed and questions of preparation for the constituent congress. The organizing committee was headed by the EQU Chairman Zharmakhan Tuyakbay. Regional organizing committees were headed by the leaders of the regional divisions of the EQU.

The JSDP Founding Congress was held at the Palace of the Republic on 10 September 2006 in Almaty, which was attended by more than 2,500 delegates from all regions of the country, as well as representatives of friendly parties and organisations. Zharmakhan Tuyakbay was elected as the party chairman. On 23 October 2006, the Political Council of the JSDP submitted to the Registration Service Committee of the Ministry of Justice of Kazakhstan the constituent documents on the formation of the party, which included a list of 127,431 members. On 25 January 2007, the party became registered. On the first coat of arms of the JSDP a rose was depicted, as one of the symbols of social democracy.

On 3 February 2007, the 2nd JSDP Congress was held, at which a decision was made to create 16 regional party branches, at a meeting of the Political Council, Amirjan Qosanov was elected as a deputy chairman.

On 11 June 2007, it announced its intention to merge with the Naghyz Ak Zhol party. According to RFE/RL "the recent amendments to Kazakhstan's constitution, including changes to the structure of parliament, have sparked speculation that early parliamentary elections will be held this year." On 18 June however, the Parliament approved an amendment to the electoral law preventing parties from forming blocs.

In the 18 August 2007 Assembly elections, the party won 4.62% of the popular vote and no seats as all of them were won by the ruling Nur Otan party. The JSDP did not recognize the election results, citing numerous violations of the country's electoral legislation.

On 9 October 2007, the Nagyz Ak Zhol withdrew from the JSDP to "qualitatively structure the country's democratic forces and resume the full-scale activities of the Nagyz Ak Zhol, in close cooperation with the JSDP." On 12 May 2008, on the initiative of the JSDP, the so-called Public Parliament "Halyq Kenesi" (People's Council) was created, an alternative to the elected one, in which representatives of more than 30 political parties and NGOs, as well as independent politicians took part.

From 29 June to 2 July 2008, a delegation of the JSDP headed by its Tuyakbay took part in the XXIII Congress of the Socialist International, held in Athens.

On 11 April 2009, a forum of the democratic opposition of Kazakhstan was held, which was attended by the JSDP, Communist Party, the Azat Party and the unregistered party Alga!. At the forum, it was decided on the need to unite these parties and an Organizing Committee was created to prepare the unification of opposition parties.

On 13 October 2009, a joint statement of the JSDP and the Azat was issued on the merger, which, according to the text of the statement, “will mark a new stage in the democratic movement,” and "the united party will become a full-fledged counterbalance to the party of power [Nur Otan]." On 24 October, a unification congress of the two parties took place. Former cosmonaut Tokhtar Aubakirov, editor-in-chief of the Svoboda Slova newspaper Güljan Erğalieva and social and political figure Baltaş Tursumbaev announced their joining the party during their speeches at the congress. Zharmakhan Tuyakbay and Bulat Abilov were elected as co-chairmen of the united party and Amirjan Qosanov as general-secretary. The union took place on the basis of the JSDP.

On 27 November 2020, at the party's extraordinary congress, the JSDP announced its decision to boycott the 2021 elections due to situation in the country not changing despite the adoption of amendments to the electoral legislation in attempt to "show attitude to the current situation" according to JSDP Chairman Ashat Rahymjanov.

On 25 February 2022, the Presidium of the Nationwide Social Democratic Party released a statement condemning the Russian invasion of Ukraine.

In the 2023 Kazakh legislative election, the JSDP won 5.20% of the vote with 4 seats, the first time in the party's history it was able to enter the Mäjilis.

== Election results ==
=== Presidential elections ===
Election	Nominee	Votes	%	Result
2022	Nurlan Äuesbaev	176,116	2.22%	Lost ✗

=== Parliamentary elections ===
==== Majilis elections ====
Election	Party leader	Votes	%	Seats	+/–	Position	Outcome
2007	Zharmakhan Tuyakbay	269,310	4.50%	0 / 98	New	▲2nd	Extra-parliamentary
2012	Zharmakhan Tuyakbay	116,534	1.68%	0 / 98	Steady	▼4th	Extra-parliamentary
2016	Zharmakhan Tuyakbay	88,813	1.18%	0 / 98	Steady	▼5th	Extra-parliamentary
2021	Ashat Raqymjanov	Boycotted					
2023	Ashat Raqymjanov	331,058	5.20%	4 / 98	▲4	▲6th	Opposition

==== Kurultai elections ====
Election	Party leader	Votes	%	Seats	+/–	Position	Outcome
2026	Ashat Raqymjanov	469,058	5.24%	8 / 145	▲8	▲5th	Opposition
