= Alatau District =

Alatau district
- City Districts
- Seal

- Location within Kazakhstan
- Coordinates: 43.2933°N 76.8292°E
- Country: Kazakhstan
- Province: Almaty
- Established: July 4, 2008

Government
  - Akim (mayor): Talgat Malybayev
- Time zone: UTC+6 (UTC+6)
- Website: http://alatau.almaty.kz

Alatau district (Kazakh: Алатау ауданы) — administrative-territorial unit of the city of Alma-Ata. Formed in 2008.

In 1993, the Alatau region was attached to the Auezov region and expanded it from the south. In 2008, the newly created Alatau district appeared as a result of the disaggregation of the Auezov District, which separated from it, its part to the north of Ryskulov Avenue. The administrative center of the district is located in the Shanyrak microdistrict. Geographically eponymous districts (Alatau until 1993 and after 2008) are located in different places.

== Akim ==
1. Manzorov, Bagdat Sailanbaevich (07.2008 — 10.07.2017)
2. Ryspaev, Shakhmerden Syrtbayevich (10.07.2017 — 01.2020)
3. Kaldybekov, Azamat Beskempirovich (17.01.2020)
