= Aq Jol =

"Aq Jol" Democratic Party of Kazakhstan «Ақ жол» қазақстанның демократиялық партиясы
- Chairwoman: Dania Espaeva
- Founders: Oraz Jandosov; Bulat Abilov; Alikhan Baimenov
- Founded: 29 January 2002; 24 years ago
- Registered: 3 April 2002
- Split from: Democratic Choice of Kazakhstan
- Headquarters: Astana
- Ideology: Liberal conservatism Economic liberalism Secularism; Pro-Europeanism
- Political position: Centre-right
- National affiliation: People's Coalition (2022)
- Kurultai: 8 / 145
- Regional councillors: 39 / 515
- Municipal Assemblies: 223 / 3,229

Website
- akzhol.kz

The Aq Jol, (Note: Kazakh: Ақ жол, pronounced [ɑq ʒoɫ]; lit. 'Bright Path') officially the "Aq Jol" Democratic Party of Kazakhstan, (Note: Kazakh: «Ақ жол» қазақстанның демократиялық партиясы, romanized: «Aq jol» qazaqstannyñ demokratialyq partiasy; Russian: Демократическая партия Казахстана «Ак жол», romanized: Demokratičeskaja partija Kazahstana «Ak žol») is a liberal-conservative political party in Kazakhstan. The party is led by Dania Espaeva, a deputy of the Mäjilis, since June 2026.

Aq Jol was formed in early 2002, after its faction became being split from the Democratic Choice of Kazakhstan. From there, it was positioned as an opposition party though in a moderate tone. The party has experienced fragmentation over the years, leading to the formation of dissident factions. Despite its opposition stance, the Aq Jol had been repeatedly described as a pro-government party in Kazakhstan, with it joining the People's Coalition in support of President Kassym-Jomart Tokayev in the 2022 election. The party has been led by Azat Peruaşev for many years.

The Aq Jol party advocates for political reform, economic liberalism, and secularism. It has participated in presidential and parliamentary elections, with varying levels of electoral success.

The party also advocates to lead the way for Kazakhstan to join the European Union in the future.

== History ==
=== Formation and early years ===
The Aq Jol was established in January 2002 after a faction of moderates separated from the Democratic Choice of Kazakhstan (QDT), a reform movement founded in late 2001 by prominent Kazakh officials who challenged President Nursultan Nazarbayev. While QDT took a confrontational stance toward the Nazarbayev administration, Aq Jol positioned itself as a moderate pro-reform, pro-business party, aiming to foster change through constructive dialogue rather than direct opposition. Key figures in the party's founding included Oraz Jandosov, Bulat Äbılov, and Alihan Baimenov, with Altynbek Särsenbaiūly, a former Information Minister, joining in 2003.

At the party's 3rd Ordinary Congress on 9 November 2003, the Aq Jol introduced a co-chair structure with leadership roles shared among Baimenov, Äbılov, Jandosov, and others. This collaborative approach shifted in March 2005 when the party unified its leadership, electing Baimenov as the sole chairman, signaling a more focused and consolidated organizational direction. However, shortly after, in spring 2005, Särsenbaiūly, Äbılov, and Jandosov left Aq Jol to form Nağyz Aq Jol (True Bright Path), a more vocal opposition faction.

In the December 2005 presidential election, Aq Jol chose not to align with the opposition coalition For a Just Kazakhstan, which had endorsed Zharmakhan Tuyakbay as its candidate. Instead, Aq Jol ran its own candidate, Alihan Baimenov, who ultimately received 1.61% of the vote. In February 2006, shortly after this election, Altynbek Särsenbaiūly, a prominent figure who had joined Nağyz Aq Jol, was tragically killed near Almaty.

The subsequent 18 August 2007 Mäjılıs elections saw Aq Jol secure 3.27% of the popular vote, yet no seats, as the ruling Nur Otan party claimed all parliamentary positions.

Aq Jol re-entered the legislative landscape in 2012, winning 8 seats in the Mäjılıs and solidifying its place as one of the three represented parties. This presence persisted with Aq Jol capturing 7 seats in the 2016 Mäjılıs elections.

In the 2004 Majilis (lower house) elections, Aq Jol gained 12.04% of the vote, securing a single seat. However, the 2007 elections were less successful, with the party receiving only 3.09% of the vote and failing to obtain parliamentary representation.

=== Peruaşev era (2011–present) ===
In 2011, Aq Jol saw a leadership transition with the election of Azat Peruaşev as party chairman, which ushered in organizational reforms and an influx of business leaders into the party.

Under Peruashev's chairmanship, the Aq Jol entered parliament in the 2012 elections, securing 7.47% of the vote and eight seats.

Following the 2016 Majilis elections, Aq Jol maintained a stable presence with seven seats, solidifying its role as a pro-business parliamentary faction focused on moderate reform and national development.

Aq Jol nominated Dania Espaeva as its candidate for the 2019 presidential election. It was the first time ever a woman ran for president in the country. Espaeva received 5.05 percent (465,714) of votes. Her participation in the election received praise from the OSCE Parliamentary Assembly election observation mission as a good start for a higher women's representation in politics.

In the 2021 elections, Aq Jol further expanded its parliamentary presence to 12 seats and won numerous local positions across Kazakhstan. The party's influence continued to grow with 222 maslikhat (local council) members elected across regional, city, and district councils, reinforcing Aq Jol's role in both local and national governance. Additionally, Aq Jol succeeded in securing 11 akim (mayoral) positions at the local level, marking a significant step in the party's regional influence.

In October 2022, the QHP joined the People's Coalition, in support of President Kassym-Jomart Tokayev, ceasing to be even nominally part of the opposition.

== Electoral performance ==
Aq Jol received 12% of the votes at the 2004 legislative elections. Alihan Baimenov refused to accept the only seat the party received at the 77 member Mäjılıs until October 2006 when he reversed his position and joined parliament as the only deputy of an opposition party. The party advocated democratization of the political system, particularly elections of governors (akims) at all levels of the administrative system.

== Election results ==
=== Presidential elections ===
Election	Candidate	Votes	%	Votes	%	Result
Election	Candidate	First round		Second round		Result
2005	Alihan Baimenov	108,730	1.61	—N/a		Lost
2019	Dania Espaeva	465,714	5.05	—N/a		Lost
2022	Supported Kassym-Jomart Tokayev	6,456,392	81.31	—N/a		Won

=== Parliamentary elections ===
==== Mäjılıs elections ====
Election	Party Leader	Votes	%	Seats	+/–	Position	Result
2004	Alihan Baimenov	572,672	12.00%	1 / 77	▲1	▲4th	Opposition
2007	Alihan Baimenov	183,346	3.10%	0 / 98	▼1	▲3rd	Extra-parliamentary
2012	Azat Peruaşev	518,405	7.47%	8 / 98	▲8	▲2nd	Opposition
2016	Azat Peruaşev	540,406	7.18%	7 / 98	▼1	2nd	Opposition
2021	Azat Peruaşev	792,828	10.95%	12 / 98	▲5	2nd	Opposition
2023	Azat Peruaşev	535,139	8.41%	6 / 98	▼6	▼4th	Opposition

==== Kurultai elections ====
Election	Party leader	Votes	%	Seats	+/–	Position	Outcome
2026	Dania Espaeva	478,083	5.21%	8 / 145	▲2	4th	TBA

== See also ==
- Category:Ak Zhol Democratic Party politicians
