= Nurlan Äuesbaev =

Kazakh politician

- Нұрлан Әуесбаев
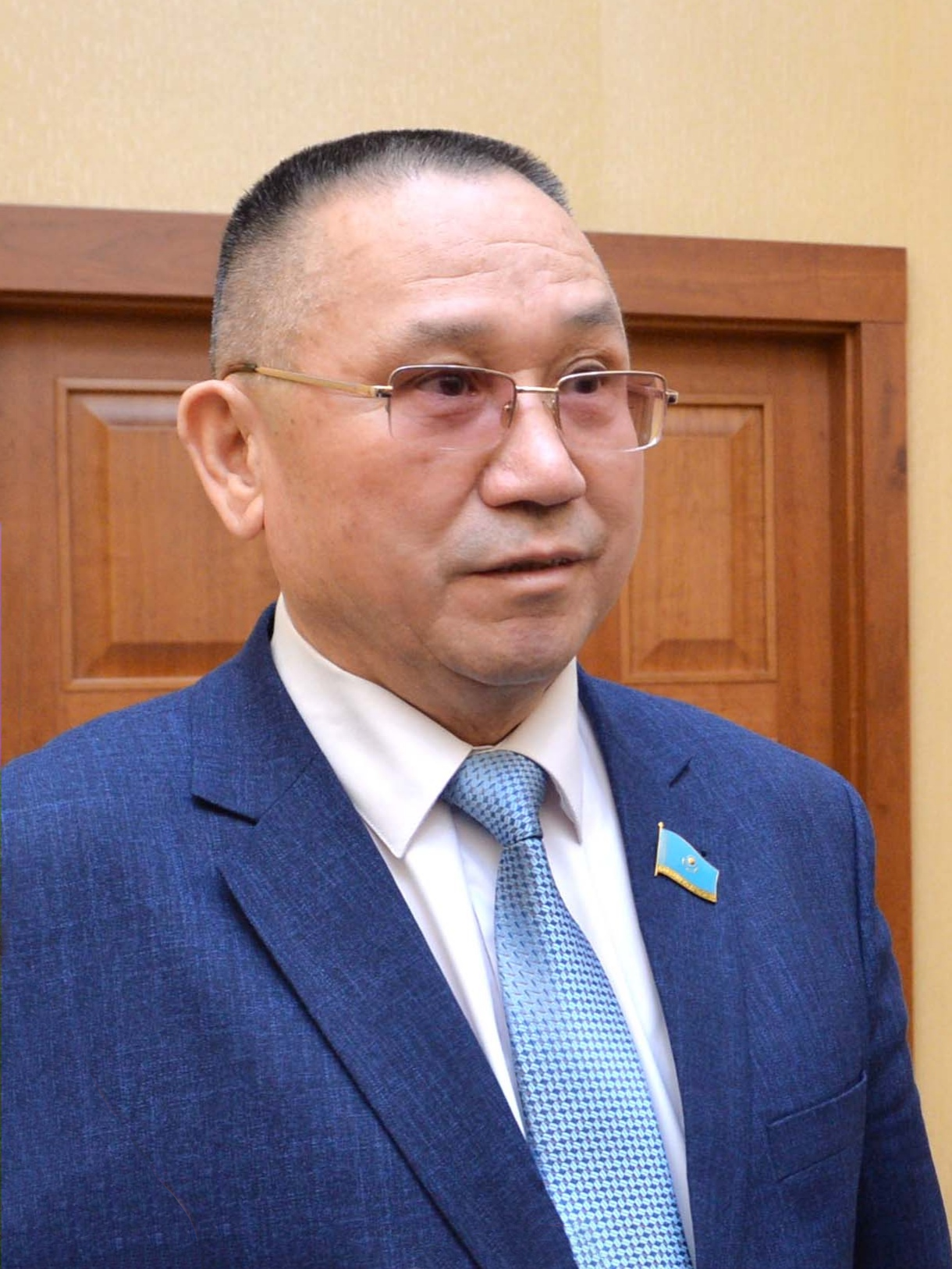
- Äuesbaev in 2023

Leader of Astana branch of the JSDP
- Incumbent
- Assumed office 2021

Personal details
- Born: 5 May 1957 (age 69) Algabas, Baydibek District, South Kazakhstan Region, Kazakh SSR, Soviet Union (now Kazakhstan)
- Party: JSDP (since 2020)
- Education: Auezov South Kazakhstan State University

Nurlan Satybaldyuly Auesbaev (Kazakh: Нұрлан Сатыбалдыұлы Әуесбаев, romanized: Nūrlan Satybaldyūly Äuesbaev, Kazakh pronunciation: [no̙ɾɫɑn sɑtɯbɑɫdɯo̙ɫə æwʲes.bɑjəf], born 5 May 1957) is a Kazakh politician who serves as the chairman of the Astana city branch of the Nationwide Social Democratic Party (JSDP) since 2021 and was the party's nominee for the 2022 presidential elections.

== Biography ==
Auesbayev was born on 5 May 1957 in South Kazakhstan Region. He studied at Auezov South Kazakhstan State University and moved to Astana.

In 2021, he was appointed as the chairman of the branch of the JSDP party in Astana. On 1 October 2022, at the 19th JSDP Extraordinary Congress, he was chosen as the party's candidate for the 2022 presidential election.
