= Saltanat Tursynbekova =

Kazakh attorney and politician

- Салтанат Тұрсынбекова
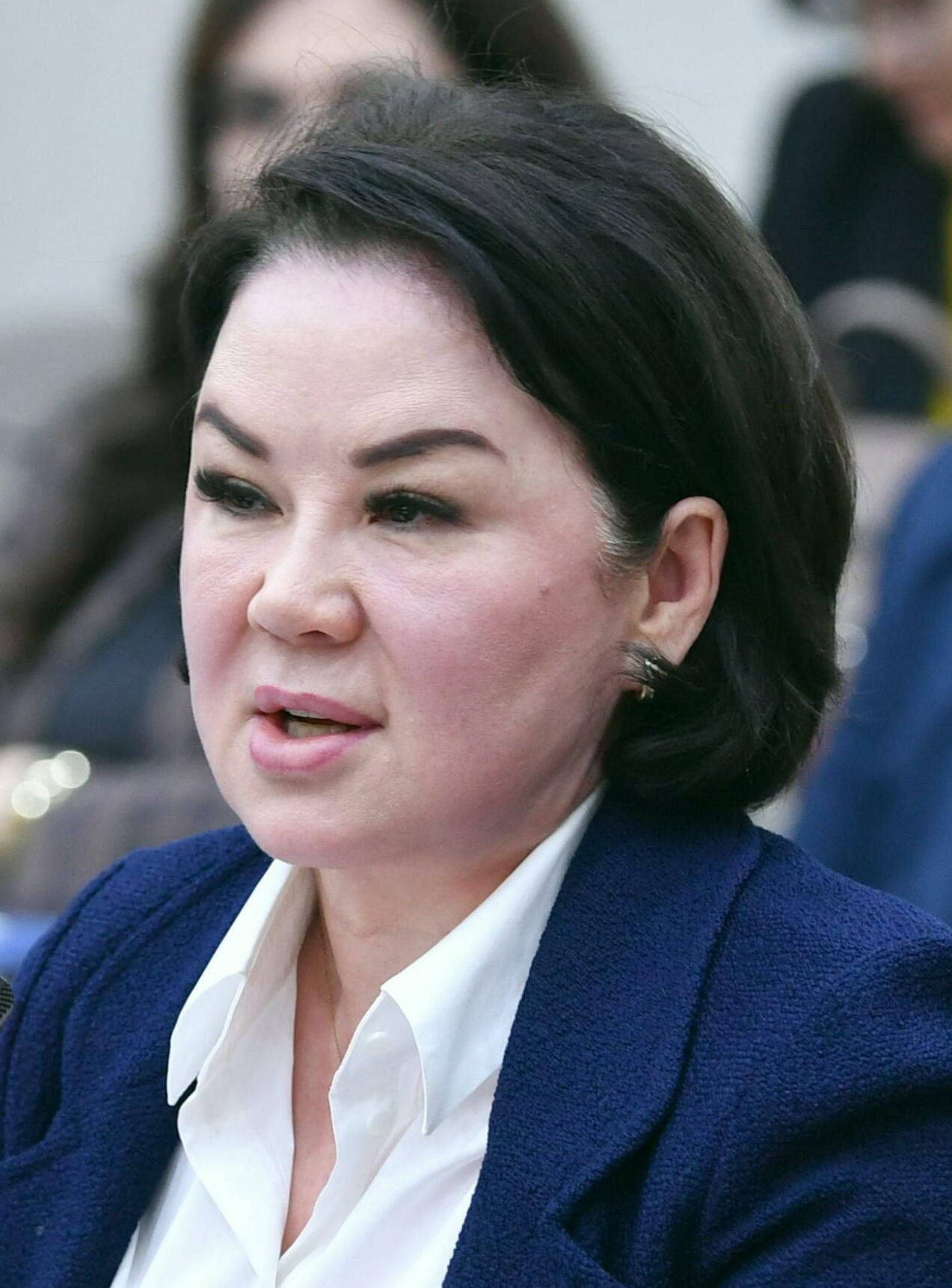
- Tursynbekova in 2023
- Born: 1966 (age 59–60); Jambyl Region, Kazakh SSR, Soviet Union
- Education: S. M. Kirov Kazakh State University; Moscow State Law Academy
- Occupations: attorney, human rights activist
- Political party: Amanat
- Other political affiliations: QA–DJ (2022)

Saltanat Parhatqyzy Tūrsynbekova (Kazakh: Салтанат Пархатқызы Тұрсынбекова, Kazakh pronunciation: [səɫtɑnɑt pɑɾχɑtqɯzɯ to̙ɾsɯnbʲekəvɒ]; born 1966) is a Kazakh attorney and civil rights activist who is serving as a deputy chairman of the National Commission on Women's Affairs and Family and Demographic Policy under the President and member of the Public Council of Astana.

Throughout her career, Tursynbekova worked within the civil service and a number of law enforcement agencies. She is known to be an outspoken critic of domestic violence in Kazakhstan and as an advocate of women's and children's rights, was one of the founders of the "Kazakhstan Free from Domestic Violence" social project which focused on prevention and response to domestic violence.

She was one of the candidates of the 2022 presidential elections for the Qazaq analary–dästürge jol public association.

== Biography ==
=== Early life and education ===
Born in Jambyl Region, Tursynbekova in the 1980s attended the S. M. Kirov Kazakh State University (now Al-Farabi Kazakh National University) and then later the Moscow State Law Academy (now Kutafin Moscow State Law University) where she graduated with a degree in law.

=== Career ===
In 1999, Tursynbekova along with her children, moved to the newly designated capital of Astana where according to her account, lived in multiple different rented apartments and was reported to have been in a "state of insanity" as she stayed up working until 2–3 AM. From 2009, she headed the Personnel Department under Prosecutor General's Office of Kazakhstan before becoming a supervisor of the Institute of Law and Order Studies and Advanced Training of Employees under the office where under her participation, draft of the concept for the development of personnel policy of law enforcement agencies was formed along with the number of legal acts on the issues of office staffing and improving the activities by law enforcement agencies were prepared. Under Tursynbekova's tenure, the activities in the improvement of the activities of law enforcement agencies were established, with educational and methodological work being carried out in all regions of Kazakhstan.

From October 2015 to January 2019, she served as senior assistant to the Prosecutor General for Special Assignments as well as an adviser to the Prosecutor General of Kazakhstan. At that time, Tursynbekova became a founder and the head of the "Kazakhstan Free from Domestic Violence" social project developed by the Prosecutor General's Office under the assistance of UN Women in 2016, which aimed at reforming Kazakhstan's legislation towards prevention and response to domestic violence in the country and was subsequently received praises by international organisations.

Tursynbekova took part in the March 2017 Mäjilis session, where she along with several MPs developed proposals for the drafted law "On combating domestic violence". In October 2019, Tursynbekova visited Geneva as part of Kazakh delegation to the UN Committee on the Elimination of Discrimination against Women and took part in defending Kazakhstan's report on the Convention on the Elimination of All Forms of Discrimination Against Women's implementation.

Since 2019, Tursynbekova cooperated with the several state agencies and international organisations including UN Women in assessing the effectiveness by Kazakh public bodies, budget planning and prevention of domestic violence, as well as rehabilitation and reintegration of women and girls back into society affected by violence work was carried out to improve the activities of the organisations.

=== 2022 presidential campaign ===
On 11 October 2022, it was revealed that Tursynbekova had been nominated by the Qazaq analary–dästürge jol public association for presidency, to where she voiced her interest in the wide range issues of within the social spheres as well as possibly foreign issues in which she expressed the need to adhere to incumbent president Kassym-Jomart Tokayev's outlined strategy, adding that any winner of the 2022 presidential election should pursue "a consistent policy".
