= Zharmakhan Tuyakbay =

Kazakh politician (born 1947)

- Жармахан Тұяқбай; Jarmahan Tūiaqbai
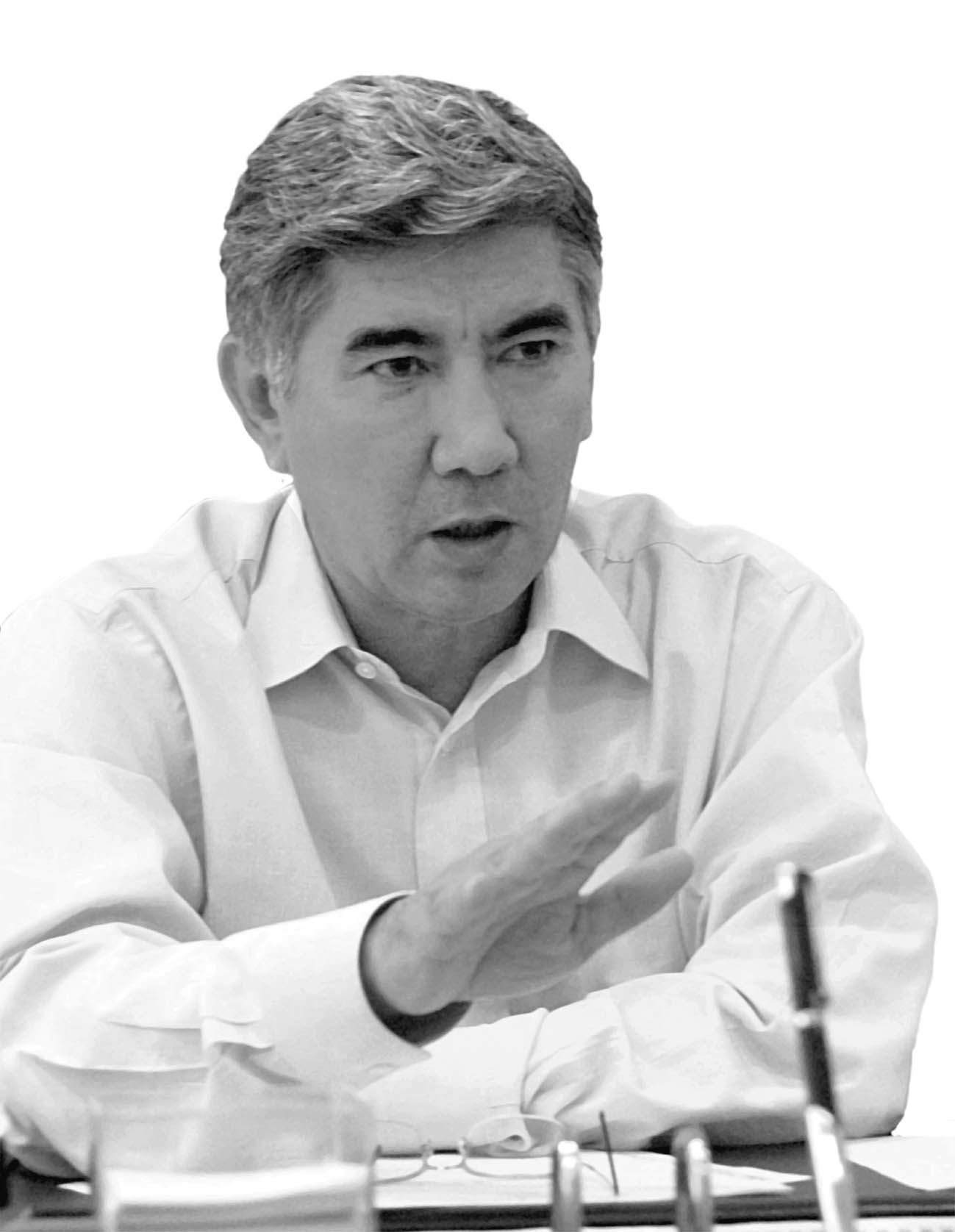
- Tuyakbay in 2005

2nd Chairman of the Mäjilis
- In office 1 December 1999 – 19 October 2004
- Deputy: Muhammed Kopeev
- Preceded by: Marat Ospanov
- Succeeded by: Oral Muhamedjanov

Member of the Mäjilis
- In office 10 October 1999 – 14 October 2004

Prosecutor General of Kazakhstan
- In office 7 December 1990 – 6 October 1995
- President: Nursultan Nazarbayev
- Preceded by: Galim Elemisov
- Succeeded by: Maksut Narikbaev

Chairman of Nationwide Social Democratic Party
- In office 10 September 2006 – 26 April 2019
- Preceded by: Position established
- Succeeded by: Ermurat Bapi

Personal details
- Born: Zharmakhan Aytbayuli Tuyakbay; 22 November 1947 (age 78) Qyzylkia, Kazakh SSR, Soviet Union
- Party: JSDP
- Other political affiliations: ÄQÜ; QKP (1975–1991)

Zharmakhan Aitbaiuly Tuyakbay (Note: Kazakh: Жармахан Айтбайұлы Тұяқбай, romanized: Jarmahan Aitbaiūly Tūiaqbai, pronounced [ʒɑrmɑχɑ́n ɑjtb̥ɑ́jʊɫə́ tʰʊjɑqb̥ɑ́j]; Russian: Жармахан Айтпаевич Туякпаев, romanized: Žarmahan Ajtpajevič Tujakpajev, pronounced [ʐərmɐˈxan ɐjtˈpajevʲɪtɕ tʊjɐkˈpajef]) (born 22 November 1947) is a retired Kazakh politician. He was the chairman of the Nationwide Social Democratic Party from 2007 to 2019 and prior to that, he served as the Mäjilis chairman from 1999 to 2004.

Tuyakbay was an opposition candidate in the 2005 Kazakh presidential election for the For a Just Kazakhstan political alliance, losing the race President Nursultan Nazarbayev to which he refused to concede. Some analysts considered Tuyakbay the most significant challenger to Nazarbayev in the election.

== Early life and career ==
Tuyakbay was born in the town of Novostroyka (present-day Qyzylkia) in South Kazakhstan Region to the parents of Aitbay Tuyakbaev (1902–1978), who was a collective farmer, and Tynym Tuyakbaeva (1925–1994). In 1971, having graduated from the Law School of the Kazakh State University, Tuyakbay was recruited by the Investigatory Department of the Shymkent Oblast Prosecutor Office.

In 1981, Tuyakbay was appointed as Deputy General Prosecutor of the Kazakh SSR. In December 1986, the Soviet government severely crushed protests in Alma-Ata in response to the appointing of the new First Secretary of the Communist Party of Kazakhstan because of his Russian ethnicity. This riot, which subsequently was named Jeltoqsan lead to numerous resignations and shifts among top Kazakh officials. Tuyakbay was removed from his office and appointed Prosecutor of Mangystau Region, and later Atyrau Region.

On 7 December 1990, one year before the collapse of the Soviet Union and proclamation of declaration of independence of Kazakhstan, Tuyakbay was appointed Prosecutor General of Kazakhstan. In 1995, he was appointed as the chairman of the State Investigatory Committee where he held the office until 1997. Upon his resignation, Tuyakbay became Chief Military Prosecutor of Kazakhstan.

== Political career ==
=== Chairman of the Mäjilis (1999–2004) ===
In 1999, Tuyakbay ran for a seat in the Mäjilis of Parliament of Kazakhstan where he won election at Sary-Agash constituency of the South Kazakhstan Region. On 1 December 1999, Tuyakbay was elected as the Chairman of the Mäjilis for a five-year term.

Several months before the 2004 legislative election, which were held on 19 September 2004, he became deputy chairman of the pro-government Otan party, and was the first on the election party list. However, on 14 October 2004, Tuyakbay publicly condemned violations during the elections and renounced his mandate as MP.

=== 2005 presidential campaign ===
On 23 November 2004, Tuyakbay was elected as the chairman of the Coordinating Council of Democratic Forces of Kazakhstan, which included the Democratic Choice of Kazakhstan (QDT), Nağyz Aq Jol, Communist Party of Kazakhstan where he led a working group for to elaborate the draft of the new Constitution of Kazakhstan.

On 20 March 2005, the political movement bloc, For a Just Kazakhstan (ÄQÜ), was formed where Tuyakbay became the chairman of the organization and was nominated as candidate for the upcoming presidential election which was supposed to be held in December 2006. However in June 2005, it was announced that a snap election would be held in December of that year. On 15 October 2005, Tuyakbay was registered as a presidential candidate by the Central Election Commission. He campaigned on the Nazarbayev's alleged corruption and vowed to fight poverty.

In the presidential election held on 4 December 2005, Tuyakbay, with slightly more than 6%, came second after Nursultan Nazarbayev, who won more than 90% of the vote. The Organization for Security and Cooperation in Europe (OSCE) concluded that the election did not meet international standards, despite some improvements in the administration of the election. Tuyakbay refused to concede his loss and called for the results to be annulled. He challenged the case to the Supreme Court of Kazakhstan which rejected his appeal on 23 December.

=== Chairman of the JSDP (2006–2019) ===
On 19 July 2006, Tuyakbay announced about establishing a new political party that would become the Nationwide Social Democratic Party (JSDP) where its founding congress was held on 10 September 2006 in Almaty. From there, Tuyakbay was chosen to be its chairman.

After the announcement of a snap parliamentary elections on 20 June 2007, Tuyakbay criticized the move as "giving the opposition too little to prepare." The JSDP came in second place and won 4.62% of the vote, however as it was expected, all the 98 contested seats were won by the ruling Nur Otan party.

In 2015, the party became a full member of the Socialist International

On 26 April 2019, during the JSDP Congress, Tuyakbay announced his resignation as the chairman of the party. He endorsed Ermurat Bapi to succeed his role who was unanimously chosen by the party delegates. However on 6 September 2019, Bapi resigned from the post as the party chairman after a vote of no confidence. Tuyakbay called this decision a "dirty coup" and called upon the delegates to restore Bapi's position.

== Personal life ==
Tuyakbay is married. He has three children and nine grandchildren.
