= 2005 Kazakh presidential election =

- 4 December 2005
- Turnout: 76.78% (▼10.27pp)
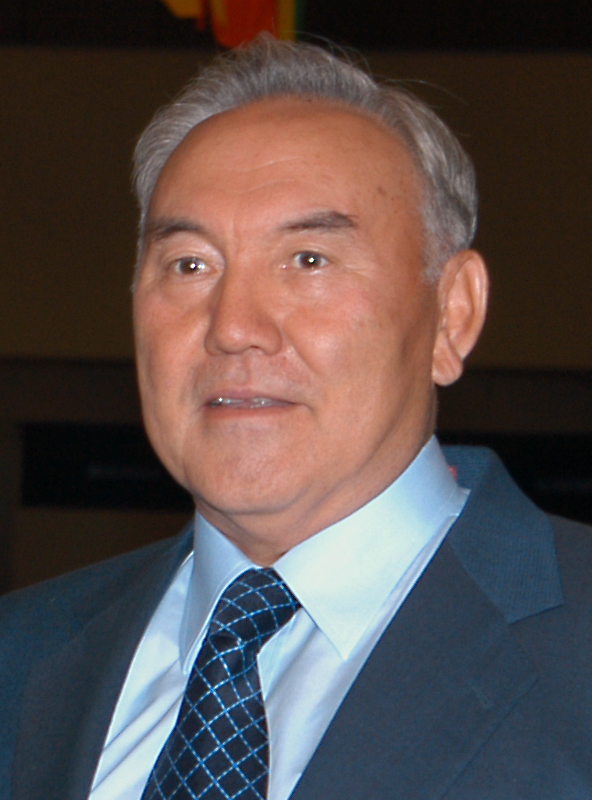

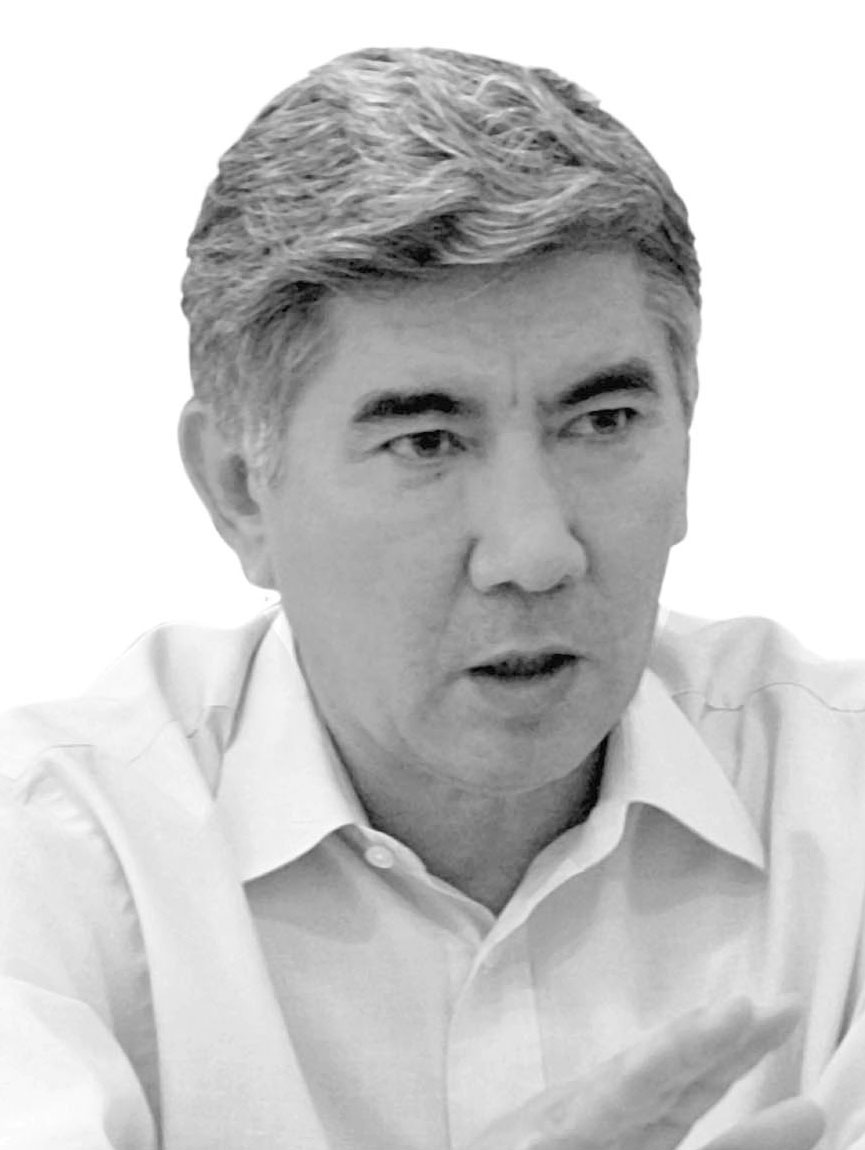
Nominee	Nursultan Nazarbayev	Zharmakhan Tuyakbay
Party	Otan	Independent
Alliance	People's Coalition	ÄQÜ
Popular vote	6,147,517	445,934
Percentage	91.15%	6.61%
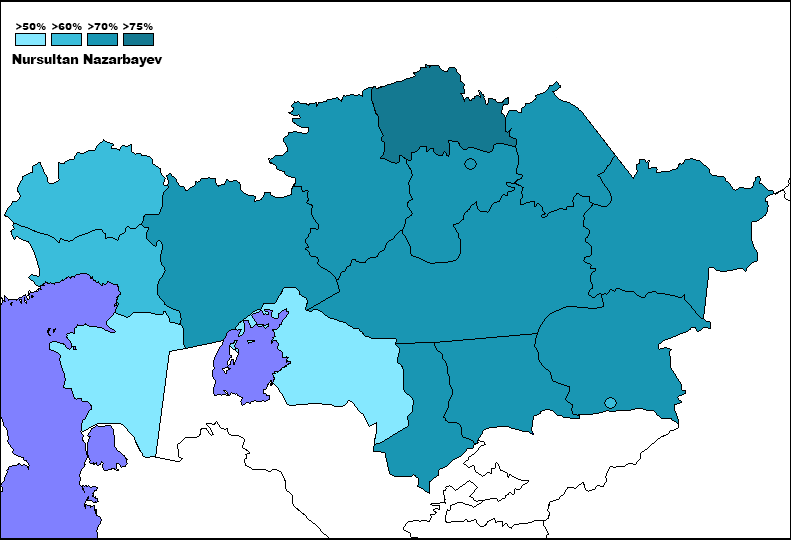
- Results by region
President before election
Nursultan Nazarbayev
Otan
Elected President
Nursultan Nazarbayev
Otan

Presidential elections were held in Kazakhstan on 4 December 2005. Incumbent president Nursultan Nazarbayev, in power since 1989, sought and won a 3rd term against four other candidates. Opposition candidates were allowed some access to the mass media, but this was still restricted. According to western election observers, opposition candidates also suffered considerable harassment. The Organization for Security and Co-operation in Europe (OSCE) criticized the elections, calling them unfair, but noted improvements.

== Background ==
On 22 June 2000, the Constitutional Council declared that the President Nursultan Nazarbayev who was reelected in 1999 for second term, was his first due to the newly adopted Kazakhstan Constitution in 1995, which happened before his reelection bid, thus making Nazarbayev eligible to run for de facto third term.

Prominent Kazakh official, Zharmakhan Tuyakbay, resigned as the Mäjilis chairman in October 2004, after accusing the government of rigging the 2004 legislative elections. The following month, he joined the opposition by becoming the chairman of the Coordinating Council of Democratic Forces of Kazakhstan in November 2004 where he worked in drafting the new Kazakh Constitution. In March 2005, Tuyakbay became the chairman of newly created political movement bloc For a Just Kazakhstan and was nominated as candidate for the election which was supposed to be held in December 2006. However in June 2005, it was announced that a snap election would be held in December 2005.

Zamanbek Nurkadilov, described as the leading figure of the opposition, was unable to take part, having died shortly before the election. A former mayor of Almaty and government minister, Nurkadilov had joined the opposition. He was found shot dead in November, shortly after reportedly saying that he would go public with documents proving government corruption. Near his body was "a pillow pierced by bullets that may have been used as a silencer". The official cause of death was presented as suicide, with a report stating that Nurkadilov had shot himself twice in the chest and then once in the head.

== Electoral system ==
The President of Kazakhstan is elected using the two-round system; if no candidate receives a majority of the vote in the first round, a second round is held between the top two candidates.

== Procedure ==
On 19 August 2005, the Constitutional Council ruled that the 2005 presidential elections must be held on the first Sunday of December 2005 and on 7 September 2005, the Mazhilis adopted a resolution, setting the election day for 4 December.

On 9 September 2005, President Nursultan Nazarbayev signed a decree "On Measures on Realization of Election Rights of Citizens of the Republic of Kazakhstan" to which it instructed various state authorities to ensure free, fair and competitive elections.

== Candidates ==
=== Registered ===
Registration of candidates was held between 3 and 24 October 2005. The Central Election Commission (OSK) received 72 submissions from the prosecution bodies on violations of the legislation, which along with petitions of citizens resulted in the re-examination the candidates' signatures. Based on the results of investigation, the CEC issued an official statement on violations of the law of the country during collection of signatures in the support to the candidates.

The following five candidates were registered to the OSK:

- Nursultan Nazarbayev, incumbent President of Kazakhstan from the Otan — registered 7 October 2005
- Zharmakhan Tuyakbay, former Mazhilis Chair, chairman and nominee for the For a Just Kazakhstan Bloc (EQU) — registered 15 October 2005
- Mels Eleusizov, ecologist, environmental activist, chairman of Tabığat, self-nominated — registered 21 October 2005
- Erasyl Abilqasymov, physician, member of the Mazhilis from the Communist People's Party of Kazakhstan (QHKP) — registered 23 October 2005
- Alikhan Baimenov, former Labour and Social Protection of the Population Minister, former Presidential Administration and Prime Minister's Office head, from the Ak Zhol Democratic Party (AJ) — registered 23 October 2005
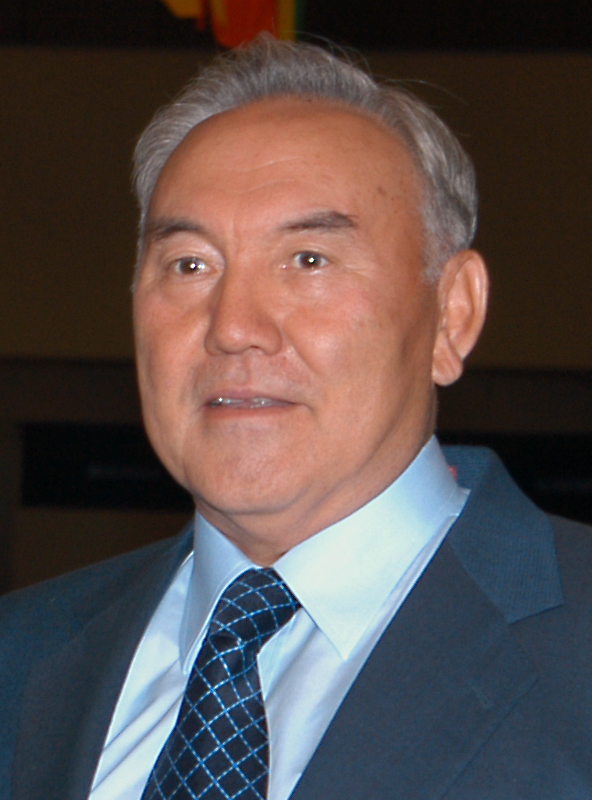
Nursultan Nazarbayev, incumbent President of Kazakhstan from the Otan

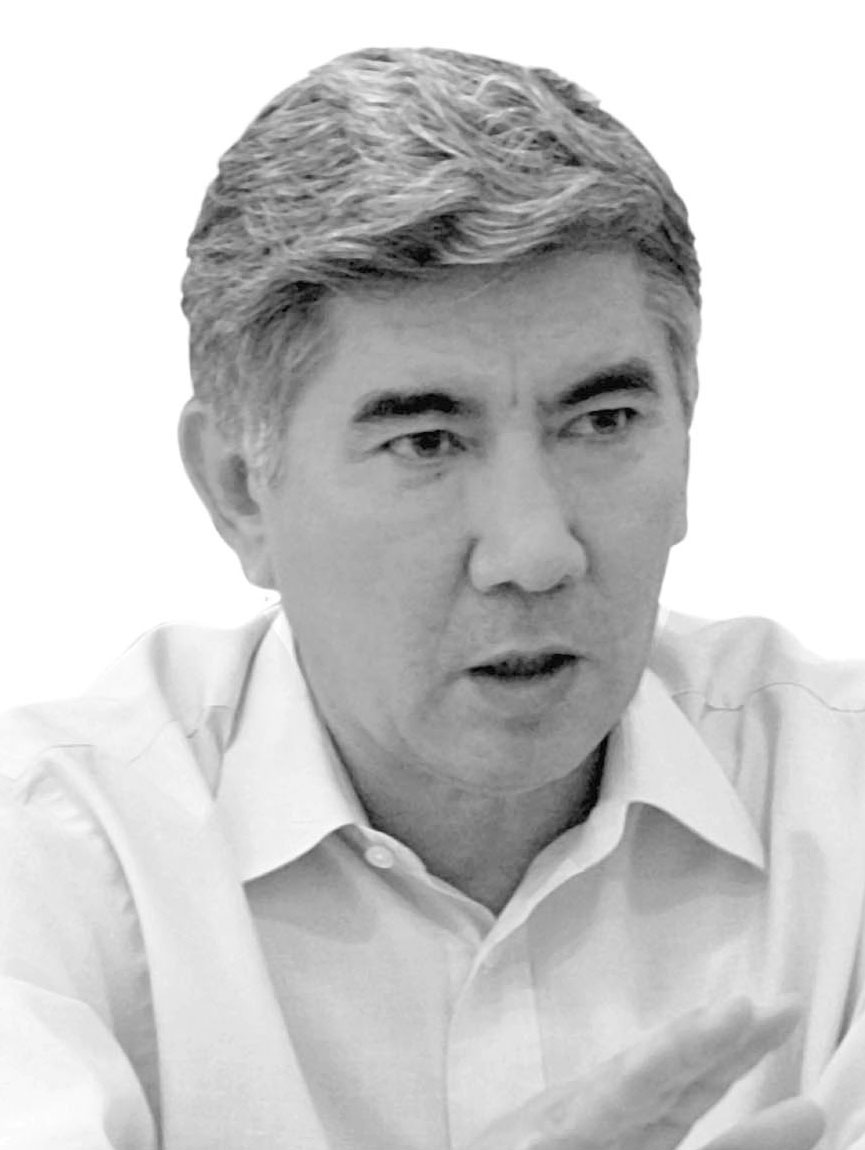
Zharmakhan Tuyakbay, former Mazhilis Chair, chairman and nominee for the For a Just Kazakhstan (EQU) bloc

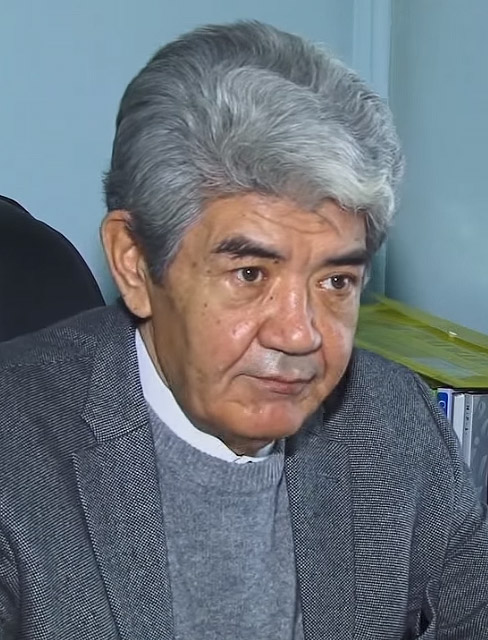
Mels Eleusizov, ecologist, environmental activist, chairman of Tabığat, self-nominated

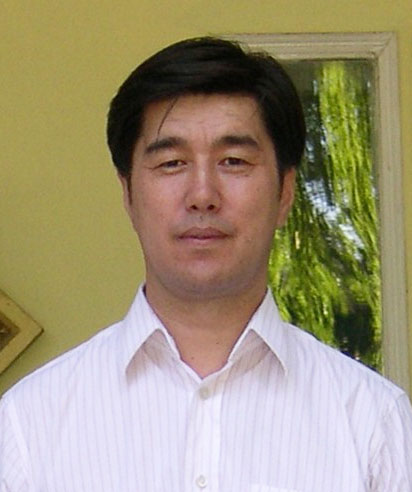
Alikhan Baimenov, former Labour and Social Protection of the Population Minister, former Presidential Administration and Prime Minister's Office head, from the Ak Zhol Democratic Party (AJ)

=== Denied ===
On 24 October 2005, due to the failure to submit the necessary documents, the following applicants were refused registration as candidates for the Presidency:

- Kärışal Asan-Ata
- Amantai Asylbek
- Jaqsybai Bäzılbaev
- Uälihan Qaisarov
- Maqsutu Orazaiu
- Sälım Ötenu
- Baltabai Raqymjanov
- Mekemtas Tıleulesov

=== Failed ===
Prior to that, registration was denied to applicants who did not meet the requirements of the Constitution of Kazakhstan for candidates:

- Satyşuly Jambulov
- Orazaly Sakaev

== Results ==
=== Overall ===
Candidate	Party	Votes	%
Nursultan Nazarbayev	Otan	6,147,517	91.15
Zharmakhan Tuyakbay	For a Just Kazakhstan	445,934	6.61
Alikhan Baimenov	Ak Zhol Democratic Party	108,730	1.61
Erasyl Abilqasymov	Communist People's Party	23,252	0.34
Mels Eleusizov	Tabighat	18,834	0.28
Total		6,744,267	100.00
Valid votes		6,744,267	98.15
Invalid/blank votes		127,304	1.85
Total votes		6,871,571	100.00
Registered voters/turnout		8,949,199	76.78
Source: Embassy of Kazakhstan in the United Kingdom

== Reactions ==
Onalsyn Zhumabekov, Chairman of Kazakhstan's Central Election Commission, declared the election valid. About 1,600 observers monitored the election, including 465 from the influential Organization for Security and Co-operation in Europe (OSCE).

Bruce George, coordinator for observers from the Organisation for Security and Co-operation in Europe, was highly critical of the election: "Regrettably, despite some efforts which were undertaken to improve the process, the authorities did not exhibit sufficient political will to hold a genuinely good election."

The OSCE has gone on record noting the following issues with the election "Unauthorized persons interfering in polling stations, cases of multiple voting, ballot box stuffing and pressure on students to vote were observed during voting and during the count, observers saw tampering with result protocols and a wide range of procedural violations."

Nazarbayev's main challenger, Zharmakhan Tuyakbay, refused to concede the race. He called for the Supreme Court of Kazakhstan to annul the election results by alleged voter fraud that was committed by the Central Election Commission. However the court found no violations and as result, Tuyakbay's claims were dismissed on 23 December 2005.
