= Nağyz Aq Jol =

Nağyz Aq Jol Нағыз Ақ Жол
- Abbreviation: NAJ
- Leader: Collective leadership
- Founded: 29 April 2005; 20 years ago
- Dissolved: 11 June 2007; 18 years ago
- Split from: Aq Jol
- Merged into: JSDP
- National affiliation: ÄQÜ (2005)

The Nağyz Aq Jol (NAJ) (Note: Kazakh: Нағыз Ақ Жол (НАЖ), pronounced [nɑʁə́z ɑq ʒoɫ (en‿ɑ‿ʒe)]; Russian: Настоящий Ак Жол (НАЖ), romanized: Nastojaščij Ak Žol (NAŽ), pronounced [nəstɐˈjæɕːɪj ɐɡ‿ˈʐol (ˌɛn‿ˌa‿ˈʐɛ)]; English: Real Bright Path (RBP)) is a former political party in Kazakhstan. It was founded by politicians Bulat Abilov, Altynbek Sarsenbaev, Oraz Jandosov, and Tulegen Zhukeyev. Nağyz Aq Jol held its first constituent congress on 29 April 2005.

Sarsenbaev was murdered on 12 February 2006, sparking much protest from the party opposition.

== History ==
=== Background ===
Its constituent congress was held on 29 April 2005. The party was formed as a split from the Ak Zhol party. Differences between the platforms of Ak Zhol and Naǵyz Ak Zhol parties are vague, if they exist at all. The split seems to be a result of personal struggles within the Ak Zhol leadership, which have effectively plagued Kazakh opposition since independence. On 13 February 2005, Ak Zhol Party co-chairman Alikhan Baimenov, cast a vote of no confidence in Altynbek Sarsenbayev, another co-chairman, alleging that Sarsenbayev had been violating the party constitution prohibiting collaboration with other political parties. Sarsenbayev had been active in the formation of the “Coordinating Council of Democratic Forces,” an alliance including the Communist Party and the Democratic Choice of Kazakhstan movement. Apparently this dispute caused the split in Ak Zhol Party.

=== Development ===
The party's co-leaders were Bulat Abilov, Altynbek Sarsenbaev, Oraz Jandosov, and Tulegen Zhukeyev until Sarsenbayev was murdered. The appeal of Naǵyz Ak Zhol, like all other opposition parties, among the electorate is insignificant. Naǵyz Ak Zhol was denied official registration for more than a year, effectively disqualifying it from nominating a candidate for the presidential elections in December 2005.
Naǵyz Ak Zhol, unable to nominate Altinbek Sarsenbaev as a candidate, supported the presidential candidate of the opposition coalition For a Just Kazakhstan in the December 2005 elections. On 11 June 2007, the party merged with the Nationwide Social Democratic Party of Kazakhstan led by former presidential candidate Zharmakhan Tuyakbay.

=== Sarsenbaev Murder ===
Altynbek Sarsenbaev was murdered on 12 February 2006 outside of Almaty. The opposition held a number of protests accusing the government for murdering Sarsenbaev because of his intimate knowledge of Kazakhgate scandal. The trial of Sarsenbaev killing was concluded with the conviction of Erzhan Utembayev, the former administrative head of Senate, and 9 others led by Rustam Ibragimov, a member of Kazakh Internal Security Forces, Arystan. According to the verdict Utembayev paid Ibragimov to kill Sarsenbaev because of the latter's derogatory remarks about him published in a newspaper.
Naggyz Ak Zhol co-leader, Bulat Abilov, has faced a number of criminal investigations which he strongly condemns as politically motivated. Charges involved “assaulting a police officer” and his business activities in 1990's when he was the head of Butya Holding.
