= For a Just Kazakhstan =

Kazakh former electoral alliance

For a Just Kazakhstan: Әділетті Қазақстан үшін (Kazakh); За справедливый Казахстан (Russian)
- Abbreviation: ÄQÜ
- Chairman: Zharmakhan Tuyakbay
- Founded: 20 March 2005; 21 years ago
- Ideology: Populism
- Member parties: QKP; Nağyz Aq Jol; QDT

For a Just Kazakhstan, or For a Fair Kazakhstan (ÄQÜ), (Note: Kazakh: Әділетті Қазақстан үшін; Ädılettı Qazaqstan Üşin; Russian: За справедливый Казахстан; Za spravedlivyy Kazakhstan) was an electoral alliance that was founded by the Communist Party of Kazakhstan, the Naghyz Ak Zhol and the Democratic Choice of Kazakhstan as an opposition coalition to nominate a single candidate in the 2005 presidential elections.

The electoral alliance was led by Zharmakhan Tuyakbay, the former chairman of Mäjilis and deputy chairman of ruling Otan party. Tuyakbay resigned from his parliamentary post after 2004 legislative election citing widespread irregularities and election fraud. He joined the loose opposition bloc and became the coalition's candidate for the presidential elections. After the elections, he founded the Nationwide Social Democratic Party in September 2006.

ÄQÜ advocated democratization of the political system, election of regional governors, investigation of corruption cases involving the family of the president Nursultan Nazarbayev and the fair redistribution of national wealth.
