= Bulat Abilov =

Kazakh politician

Bolat Äbılov
- Болат Әбілов
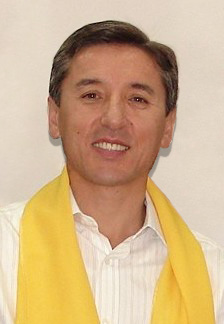
- Abilov in 2005
- Born: 15 September 1957 (age 69); Karaganda, Karaganda Oblast, Kazakh SSR, Soviet Union
- Occupation: Politician

Bolat Mūqyşūly Äbılov (Note: Often transliterated as Bulat Mukishevich Abilov through a Russified Romanization of Булат Мукишевич Абилов.) (Kazakh: Болат Мұқышұлы Әбілов; born 15 September 1957) is a Kazakh politician. Abilov was the Deputy Chairman of the Otan political party in Kazakhstan. He achieved this position following the death of Speaker and Deputy Chairman Marat Ospanov.

In 2011, as leader of the All National Democratic Party Azat, Abilov referred to as "a political game" a plan by President Nursultan Nazarbayev to sell to the public discounted shares of oil stock KazMunaigas Exploration and Development, the production subsidiary of KMG, Kazakhstan's state oil company. Abilov said, "Rich people will buy the shares as usual, but ordinary Kazakhs will not participate."
