= 2022 Kazakh presidential election =

- 20 November 2022
- Turnout: 69.44 (▼8.10pp)
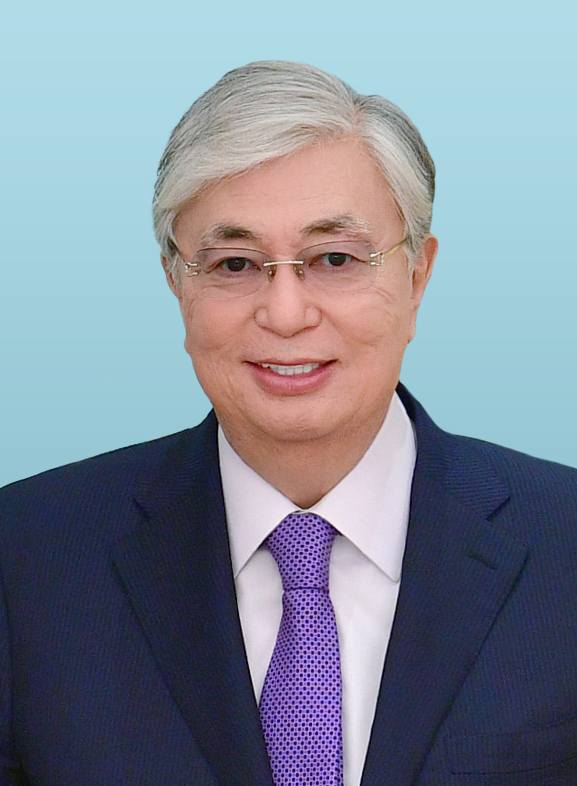

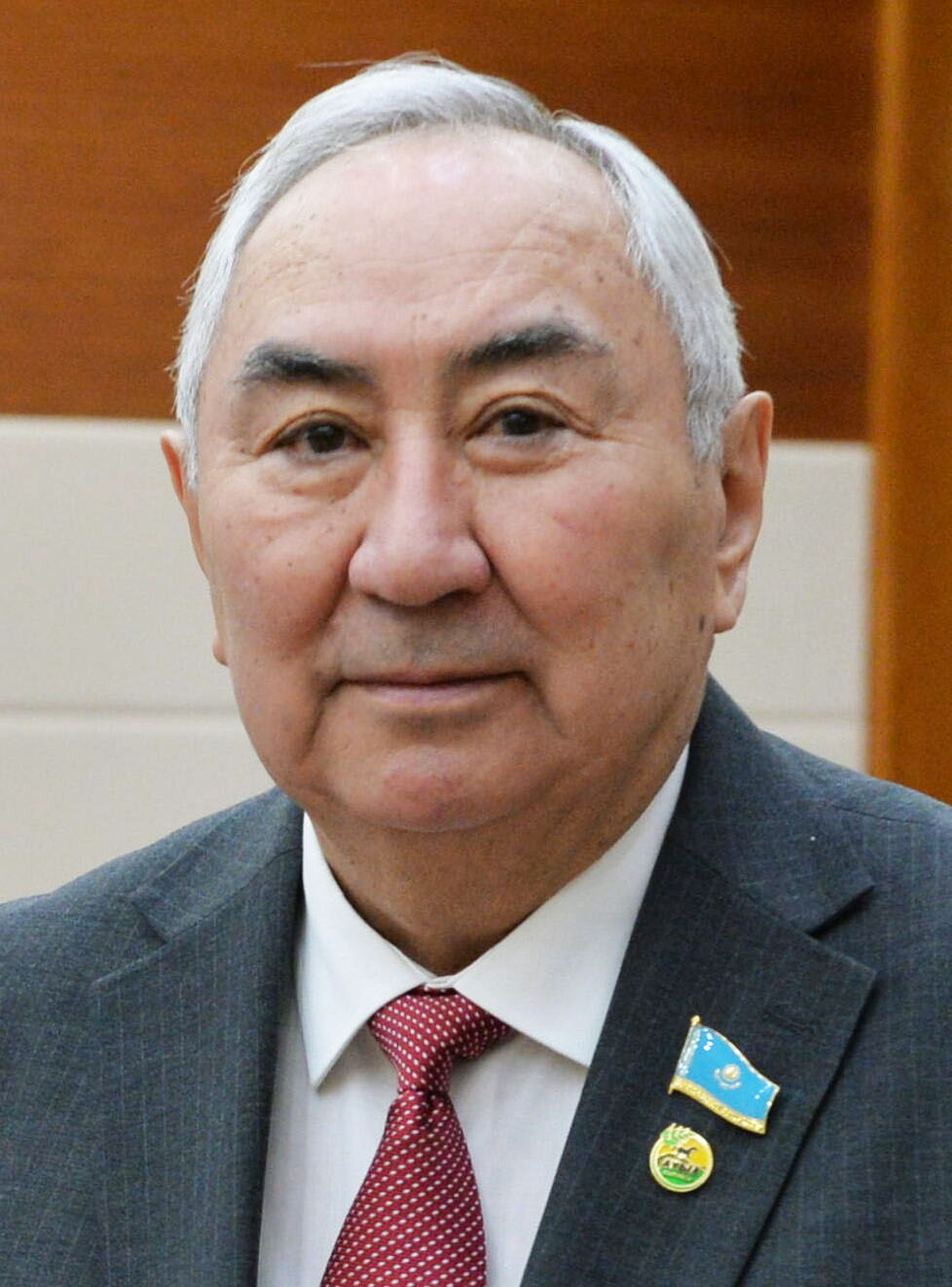
Nominee	Kassym-Jomart Tokayev	Jiguli Dairabaev
Party	Independent	Auyl (Note: Independent; endorsed by a registered political party, political alliance, or public association.)
Alliance	People's Coalition
Popular vote	6,456,392	271,641
Percentage	81.31%	3.42%
- Results by region
President before election
Kassym-Jomart Tokayev
Independent
Elected President
Kassym-Jomart Tokayev
Independent

Presidential elections were held in Kazakhstan on 20 November 2022. This was the seventh presidential election since Kazakhstan's independence from the Soviet Union in 1991. Incumbent president Kassym-Jomart Tokayev, an independent, was re-elected for a second term in a landslide, receiving 81% of the vote. His closest challenger, Jiguli Dairabaev of the Auyl Party, received just 3% of the vote, marking the first time since 2015 that all candidates other than the incumbent president failed to garner 5% or more of the vote. This was the first national election since 1999 in which the "against all" option was included on the ballot paper. It received 6% of the total vote. Voter turnout was 69%, the lowest ever in a Kazakh presidential election.

Originally scheduled for December 2024, President Tokayev called for a snap election in his September 2022 State of the Nation Address, proposing a constitutional amendment to set the presidential term to a single, nonrenewable seven-year term. He also announced his intention to run for a second term, raising concerns that the amendment, adopted after the election, could allow him to serve beyond the two-term limit, extending his time in office since his first election in 2019. To address these concerns, Tokayev’s proposed amendment was ratified into law before the vote, establishing the seven-year term limit. On 21 September he set the election date by decree for 20 November 2022.

A total of twelve candidates were nominated for the election, with six qualifying for the ballot. Among them were Qaraqat Äbden (National Alliance of Professional Social Workers) and Saltanat Tursynbekova (QA–DJ). For the first time, multiple female candidates appeared on the ballot. Tokayev was supported by the People’s Coalition, an electoral alliance of parliamentary parties including Amanat, Aq Jol, and the People’s Party, along with various public associations. Jiguli Dairabaev was nominated by the Auyl, the only pro-government party to contest the election. Nūrjan Ältaev, a former Amanat deputy and a member of the divided Coalition of Democratic Forces, was barred from running by court order. This left Nurlan Auesbaev as the only registered candidate from the self-proclaimed opposition Nationwide Social Democratic Party. Most of the candidates challenging Tokayev were seen as "pocket candidates" due to their relative obscurity and lack of popularity.

The elections followed the 2022 unrest and a constitutional referendum. Campaigns focused on issues like COVID-induced inflation, political reforms, democracy, and oligarchy. Other concerns included the use of the Kazakh language and socioeconomic issues related to agriculture, family life, and feminism. Protests questioning the legitimacy of the election were met with government crackdowns and prosecutions. Reports prevailed of internet outages, DDoS attacks, and pressure on independent media.

Tokayev was widely expected to win the election, and exit polls showed he received the majority of votes. He was declared the winner early on 21 November 2022, with the Central Election Commission officially certifying his victory on 22 November. Tokayev was inaugurated for his second term on 26 November at the Palace of Independence in Astana. Shortly after, he called for a January 2023 Senate election, dissolved the 7th Parliament of Kazakhstan, and set a legislative election for 19 March 2023.

The Organization for Security and Co-operation in Europe (OSCE) praised the election’s preparation but noted the lack of competition, emphasizing the need for laws to ensure "genuine pluralism".

== Background ==
The previous presidential elections were held in 2019, which saw then-acting president Kassym-Jomart Tokayev officially elected as the second president of Kazakhstan. At that time, he was considered by numerous political observers to be a staunch loyalist for Nursultan Nazarbayev.

Nazarbayev had resigned in March 2019, after a series of pro-democracy protests. Nazarbayev continued to be viewed as the de facto leader of Kazakhstan due to his lifetime chairmanship of the Security Council as well as him carrying the constitutional title of "Elbasy" ("leader of the nation"), which allowed him to retain many post-presidential executive powers and significant influence over the government.

However, Tokayev began exerting his own political influence, starting with Dariga's dismissal from her Senatorial post in 2020. He also chaired the Assembly of People of Kazakhstan and later the ruling Amanat party, which were both previously chaired by Nazarbayev himself. Despite Tokayev's increasing self-empowerment, his presidency was criticised for falling short of international and democratic standards, bringing little change to Kazakhstan overall.

=== 2021 legislative elections ===
Legislative elections to the Mazhilis were held in January 2021 for the first time under Tokayev's presidency. Prior to the vote, several laws were adopted in an attempt to develop a multi-party system in Kazakhstan. These included reducing the political party membership threshold for registration, formation of a parliamentary opposition and establishing a mandatory 30% woman and youth quota within the party list. However, no new political parties were registered as a result, thus leaving only six registered parties to compete in the legislative elections. The Nationwide Social Democratic Party, the only opposition party to qualify for the legislative ballot, boycotted the vote.

Despite Tokayev's prior pledges for a multi-party system, and expressed hopes for different parties to enter the Parliament, the composition of the newly elected 7th Parliament virtually remained the same compared to 2016. The ruling Nur Otan party retained its super-majority control of the lower house, the Mazhilis. The OSCE criticised the election as being uncompetitive and with lack of genuine choice. The 2016 legislative elections also saw the return of Dariga Nazarbayeva as an MP, which once again fueled speculations regarding Nazarbayev's post-presidential influence. As the 7th Parliament convened on 15 January, Tokayev unveiled a third package of reforms. He pledged to further develop the Kazakh political system, and to strengthen human rights.

=== 2021 municipal elections ===
During the State of the Nation Address in 2020, Tokayev proposed for äkims (local leaders) of rural municipalities to be elected directly for the first time within the following year. To achieve this, Tokayev signed a presidential decree to implement his proposals on 14 September 2020. In early 2021, the parliament passed a series of bills that allowed independent and nominated candidates to run for municipal elections, which were subsequently signed into law by Tokayev.

With a total of 2,297 candidates vying for posts, 730 rural äkims were elected in a July 2021 general vote. Nur Otan overwhelmingly dominated the results, and other candidates encountered several problems. The Diplomat described the municipal elections as "another instance of cosmetic reform made in the name of Tokayev's 'listening state'".

=== Post-pandemic recovery and growing social discontent ===
The COVID-19 pandemic in Kazakhstan brought a series of socioeconomic, educational, health, and political upheavals. In response, the Kazakh government introduced a series of emergency measures. Human Rights Watch complained that COVID-19 "elevated inequality" and called for the Kazakh government to "urgently expand relief programs and provide stronger social protection."

At the beginning of 2021, the vaccination rollout in Kazakhstan began and initially fared poorly due to public skepticism and mistrust. To accelerate jab uptake, the Kazakh government introduced mandatory vaccination, testing and health pass requirements in public settings. These measures received mixed results: while they increased the vaccination rates in Kazakhstan, the result was also marred by massive use of fraudulent vaccine passports and unvaccinated people being miscounted as vaccinated. The controversial policy was also met with unsanctioned anti-vaccine protests in several cities.

Although the Kazakh economy had begun recovering in late 2020 and eventually reached its pre-pandemic real GDP growth rate of 3.5% by October 2021, it was affected by the COVID-19 pandemic due to low oil prices and domestic activity. This resulted in Kazakhstan facing an inflation surge, with the cost of food being the most impacted, and an inflation rate of around 8.5% in late 2021. High inflation and rising prices led to a wave of labour strikes, especially in Western Kazakhstan. The Oxus Society's Central Asian Protest Tracker recorded more strikes in the first 6 months of 2021 than in the years 2018 – 2020 combined, indicating a rise in social discontent.

=== January 2022 unrest and purges of Nazarbayev's affiliates ===
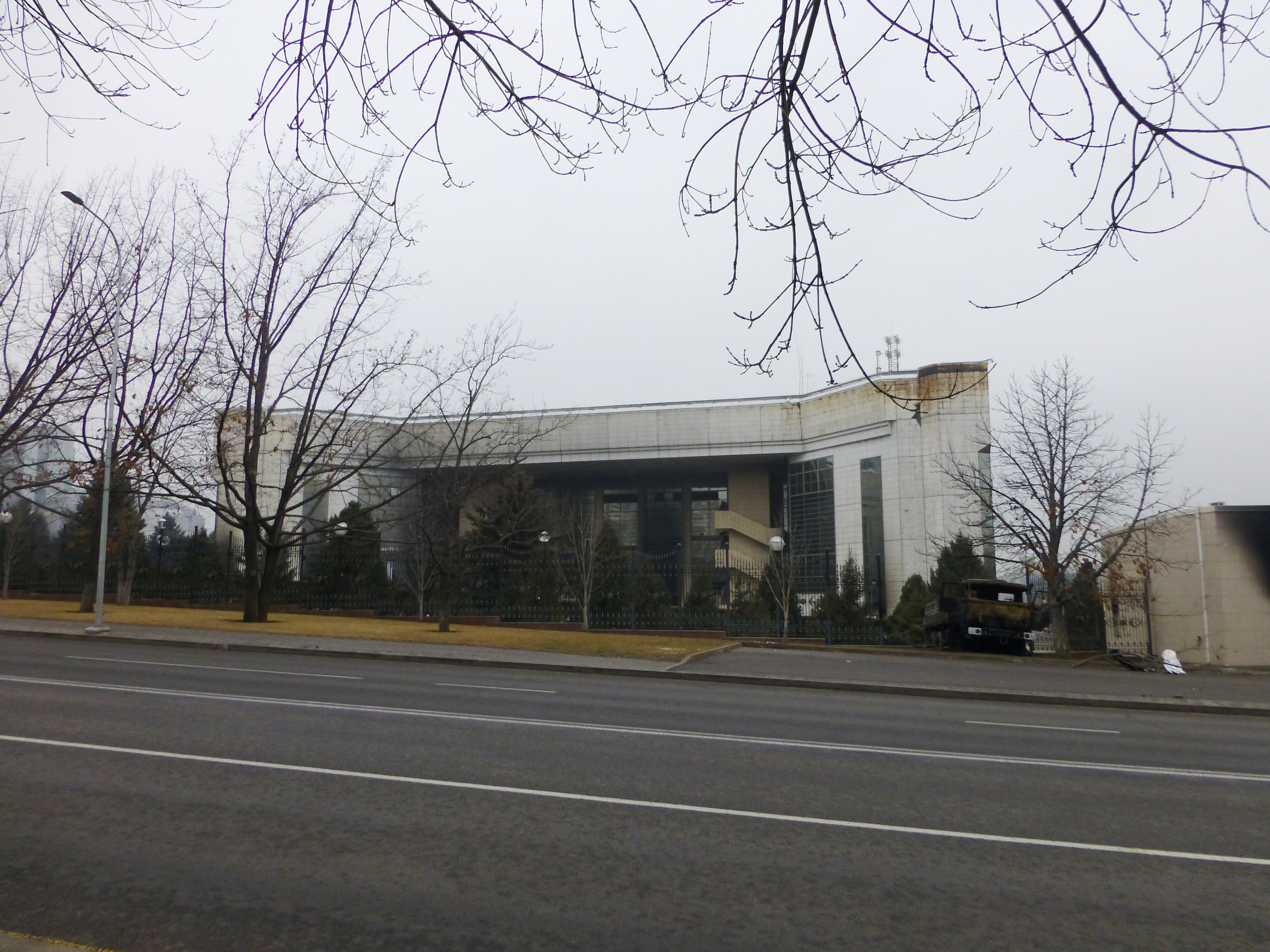
President's Residence after being stormed by protesters during the unrest in Almaty, 10 January 2022

On 1 January 2022, the Kazakh government lifted the price ceiling on liquefied petroleum gas (LPG). This marked the final phase in their planned transition towards the price of LPG being determined by a digital market and led to a drastic increase in LPG prices. Due to LPG being subsidised during the transition period, many vehicle owners had switched to LPG and were now facing steep prices in addition to their increasing cost of living. Especially Kazakhs in the rather poor Mangystau Region were affected and with the social discontent rising even more, protests broke out in the oil-producing city of Zhanaozen on 2 January 2022.

In the beginning, the protests in Western Kazakhstan were essentially low-key and small scale with the protesters demanding a price reduction of LPG. Those demands evolved into calls for political and socioeconomic reforms while the discontent spread to other Kazakh regions. In an attempt to appease the public, President Tokayev ordered the government to reinstate a six-month price cap on LPG, petrol, diesel fuel, and basic food products, as well as including a moratorium on the prices of home utilities, along with a rent subsidy for low-income residents. He also urged Kazakh citizens not to disturb public order and that all legitimate demands by the protesters would be considered. However, Tokayev's concessions failed to subdue the anger and by the third night of ongoing protests, the demonstrations turned into riots. The first and largest city in which riots broke out was Almaty, where violent clashes between protesters and government forces lead to gunfire and looting taking place all over the city. Various government buildings across Kazakhstan were stormed and set on fire and there were reports of internet blackouts. In response to the spreading of anarchy, President Tokayev enacted a state of emergency and dismissed PM Asqar Mamin's government. He also requested the intergovernmental military-allied Collective Security Treaty Organization for peacekeeping intervention and authorised deadly force to be used against protesters as part of a "counterterrorist operation".

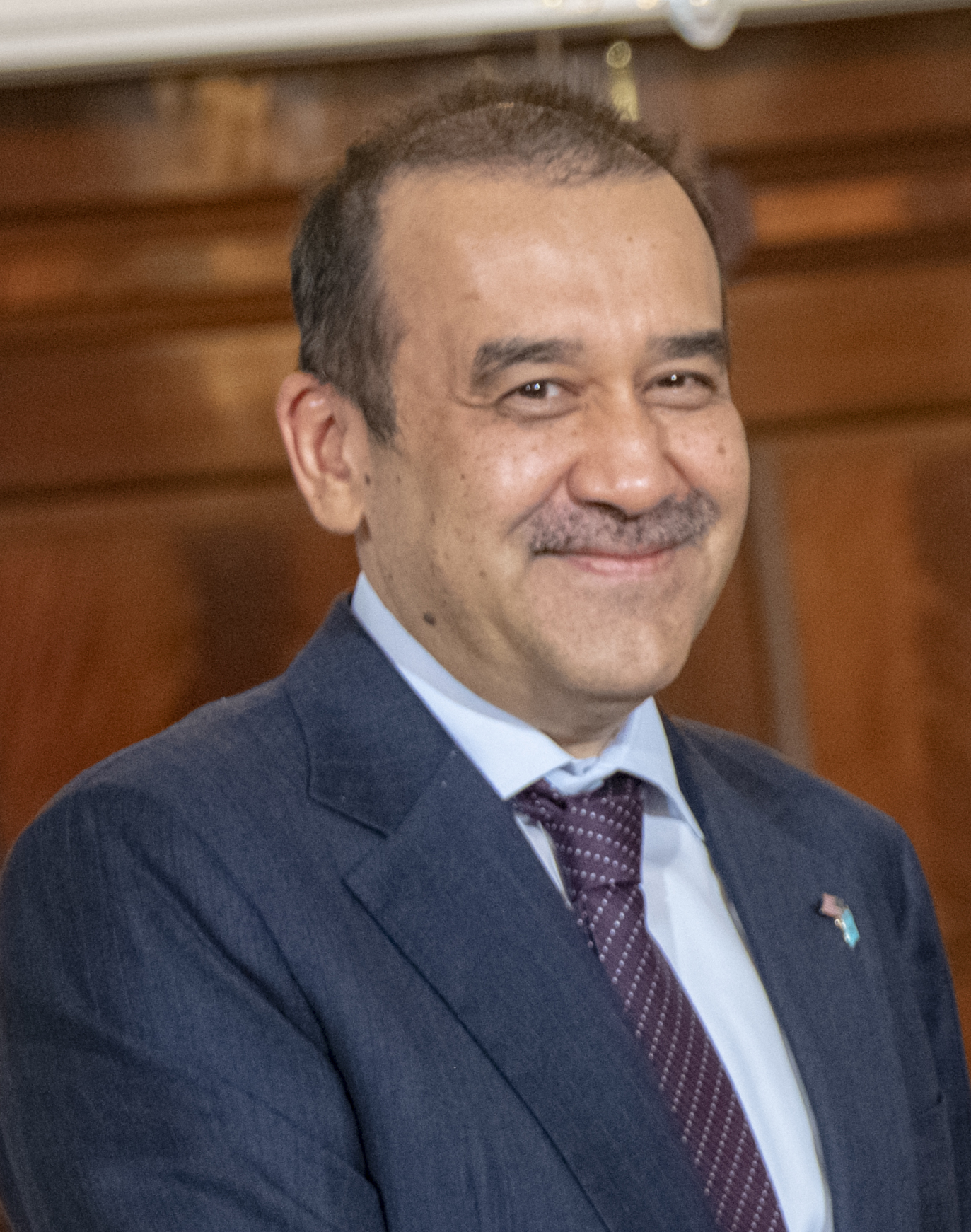
National Security Committee chairman Karim Massimov (pictured in 2019) was a main suspect charged with treason by Tokayev

The aftermath of the massive unrest reportedly left 225 people dead and over 2,600 injured, as well as damage estimated at more than $2 billion. Due to its severity, the unrest became infamously known as "Bloody January" (Kazakh: Қанды қаңтар). Many local and international human rights groups reported the Kazakh government's subsequent use of prison torture, ill-treatment, and custody deaths regarding over 10,000 detainees which included protesters, journalists, human rights activists and bystanders. During that period, the Kazakh government was criticised for failing to conduct a proper independent investigation of civilian deaths during the unrest and essentially refused to publish the official list of unrest victims until August 2022. The published list only provided the last names and initials of the victims' names instead of fully detailed information and in turn, raised the death toll higher.

President Tokayev himself accused the January unrest as being an "attempted coup d'état" which was instigated by 20,000 terrorists with foreign support from neighbouring Central Asian countries, Afghanistan and the Middle East, a claim which has been dismissed by numerous political experts and analysts as no evidence showed any signs of foreign involvement in connection with the protests. Others suspected a power struggle behind the unrest, with former president Nazarbayev and his successor Tokayev being the main players in the conflict. The dismissal of Nazarbayev from his lifelong Security Council position was seen as proof of this hypothesis. Nevertheless, Nazarbayev himself denied any claims of an alleged elite conflict and described them as being rumours.

Notwithstanding Nazarbayev's reassurances in dismissing power struggle speculations, Tokayev began a series of purges and crackdowns against several officials that were known to be loyal to Nazarbayev, beginning with the arrest of former Prime Minister and National Security Committee chairman Karim Massimov, who was charged with treason. Massimov's deputy and Nazarbayev's nephew Samat Abish were also dismissed from the UQK. Other officials who were Nazarbayev's relatives faced resignations from various leading roles in companies, which the Eurasianet described as part of "De-Nazarbayevification". Additionally, in February 2022 a series of bills were passed in the Parliament which ensured an end to Nazarbayev's lifetime chairmanship of the Security Council and the Assembly of People. Dariga Nazarbayeva, who was previously elected as a deputy in 2021, resigned from her Majilis seat in February 2022.

=== 2022 constitutional referendum and snap election speculations ===
During the State of the Nation Address in March 2022, President Tokayev announced political and constitutional reforms which would reduce his executive powers and grant the Parliament more authority. To achieve this, he initiated a constitutional referendum that would amend 33 of the document's 98 articles. During the drafting process, several controversial changes were proposed that would have e.g. derecognised Russian as the official language or granted former president Nazarbayev a new title called "founder of independent Kazakhstan". Due to extensive public backlash, these proposals were scrapped. Throughout the campaigning, the proposed amendments and holding a constitutional referendum were supported by all pro-government political parties, state institutions, NGOs, public figures, and statesmen while the opposition criticised the referendum for its financial cost, short timeframe for campaigning and a lack of dialogue between the Kazakh government and citizens during the drafting process. In the end, the constitutional changes were officially approved by 77.2% of the voters.

The 2022 constitutional referendum was viewed as an attempt to boost President Tokayev's legitimacy and potential second-term ambitions by political analysts. Political scientist Dosym Satpaev described the referendum as a "mini-rehearsal of the upcoming presidential elections", while Gaziz Abishev, political scientist and editor-chief of Turan Times, hinted at the possibility of a snap presidential election taking place by the end of 2022. He also noted that the move would reduce Tokayev's length in office by a few years and instead suggested for the snap presidential election to be held in 2023 or early 2024 at the latest to leave "wide room for maneuver" by Tokayev. Senate chairman Mäulen Äşimbaev called the speculations of snap presidential elections being held in the autumn of 2022 "groundless rumors", stating that "elections will be held within a certain period of time [and] everything will be held according to the law."

=== State of the Nation Address and announcement of snap elections ===
On 1 September 2022, during the State of the Nation Address, President Tokayev announced snap presidential elections to take place in the autumn of that year, insisting that a "new mandate of trust from the people" is necessary as a basis for his decision.

In accordance with Article 51 of the Constitutional Law "On Elections", a snap presidential election is held by the decision of the President and shall be conducted within two months from the date of its appointment. Regarding the speculations on the exact date that the elections would be held, political scientist Daniar Äşimbaev whilst taking into account election campaigning, suggested 20, 24 November or 4 December as being likely dates for the 2022 presidential election. KazTAG alluded to 13 November being the election day, since during an interview with the People's Party of Kazakhstan (QHP) deputy Irina Smirnova stated that any parties or movements must always be prepared for candidacy and hinted that the polls would fall on a Sunday date after being asked whether candidates had enough time to prepare for snap elections.

On 21 September 2022, President Tokayev signed a presidential decree, which set 20 November 2022 as the election day. In his address to the nation, Tokayev pledged that the election would lead to "a radical reset of the entire political system" and that it would be conducted under "strict accordance with the law" with it being "fairly, openly and with the broad participation of domestic and international observers."

== Electoral system ==
Official logo for the election.

The President of Kazakhstan is elected using the two-round system; if more than two presidential candidates are included in the ballot and no one receives a majority of the vote in the first round, a second round is held between the top two candidates no later than two months after the first round is held. If the presidential election is declared null and void or has not determined the winner, then the Central Election Commission (CEC) may schedule a re-run election no later than two months after an initial vote is held.

According to Article 41 of the Constitution, a citizen of Kazakhstan by birth must be at least 40 years old, have a minimum of five years of experience working in public service or elected positions, be fluent in the state language and have been a resident of Kazakhstan for the last 15 years to be elected and serve as president. The right in nominating presidential candidates under Article 55 of the Constitutional Law "On Elections" is reserved only for registered republican public associations.

Article 51 of the Constitutional Law "On Elections" establishes the first Sunday of December as a general date for the presidential election. Therefore regular elections would have taken place on 1 December 2024 as Tokayev's five-year term was set to end by then.

=== "Against all" ballot column and its outcome on the election results ===
Following the implementation of the law "On the introduction of amendments and additions to some legislative acts of the Republic of Kazakhstan on election issues" in May 2021, the "Against all" column was reintroduced into the ballots. On 22 September 2022, the CEC announced that the "Against all" choice would be in place for the 2022 election.

Regarding whether the voting option would affect the outcome of the presidential election, CEC member Şavkat Ötemisov insisted that there would be no need for legislative action in this scenario due to no real-life examples of this happening elsewhere and that the "Against all" column is "necessary for citizens to express their views on the candidates". Justice Minister Qanat Musin asserted that the "Against all" votes would only be taken into account as "evidence of voter turnout" and that the election results would only be determined by the number of votes cast for the candidates, regardless of whether the majority of people choose to vote "Against all", in which Musin elaborated that option exists solely as an "exercise of the right to participate in the elections".

=== Seven-year presidential term proposal and enactment ===
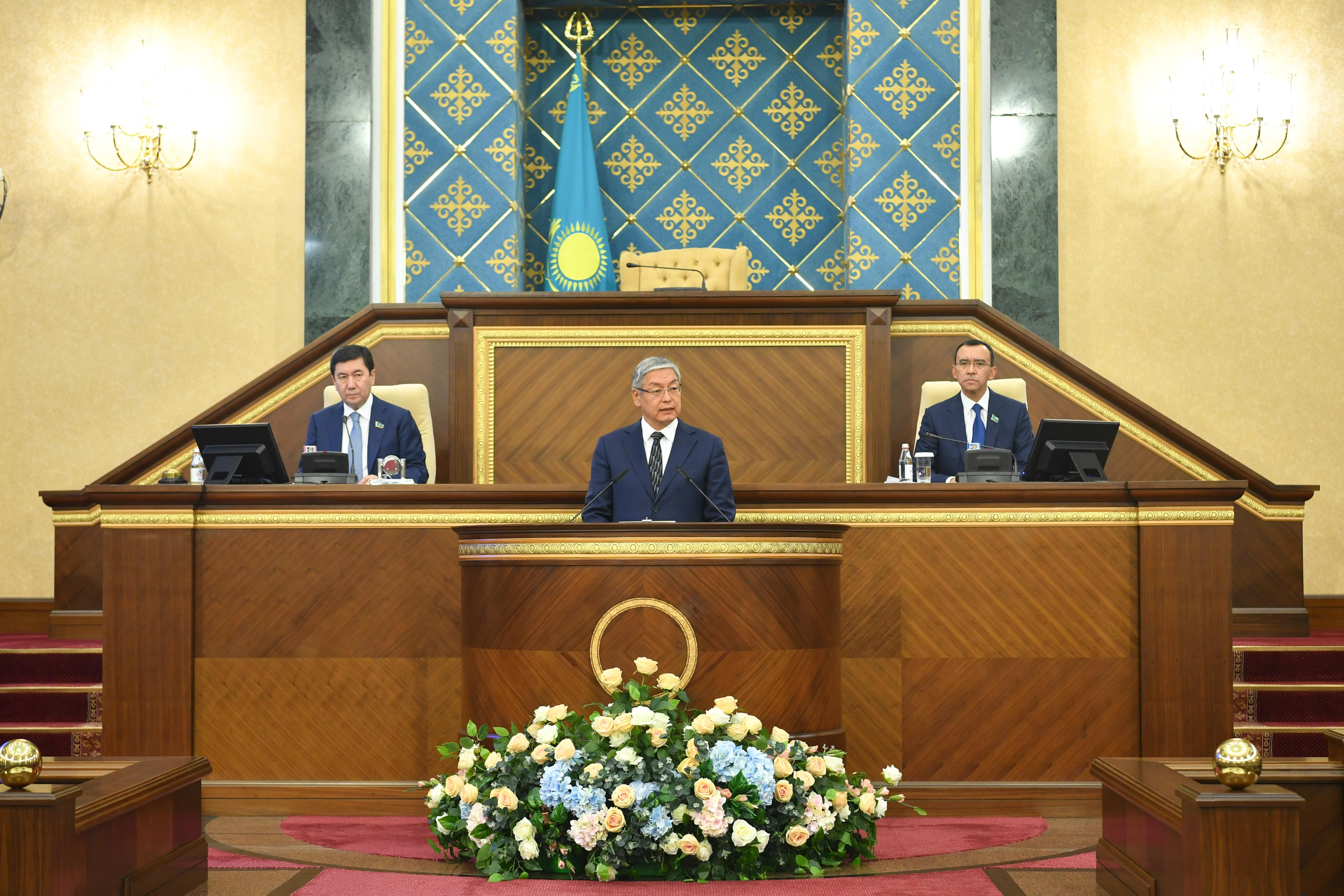
Justice Minister Qanat Musin addressing MPs the proposed constitutional amendment for a presidential term at a joint session of the Parliament, 16 September 2022

In his State of the Nation Address President Tokayev also proposed a constitutional amendment to limit the presidential term from two five-year terms to a single seven-year term and initially planned to submit his proposal to Parliament after the election.

However, following Tokayev's announcement numerous questions and speculations arose regarding his proposals on presidential term changes and limits. State Counsellor Erlan Karin praised Tokayev's initiative as "a final step away from the super-presidential model", saying that a "one-time presidential norm stabilizes the country's political system for a long time, prevents monopolization of power and strengthens the basic principles of democracy." According to Mäulen Äşimbaev, the Senate chairman, a seven-year term would allow for the "development of political competition" and "reduces the risk of monopolising power", assessing that every elected head of state in the world serves for about 10 years.

Catherine Putz wrote in The Diplomat that constitutional changes in presidential terms could potentially allow Tokayev to serve as president for more than two terms until 2034. Political scientist Dosym Satpaev also supported the theory that holding a snap election was an attempt by Tokayev to prolong his term of office due to his fears of losing popularity until the original 2024 scheduled presidential elections. This could lead to political instability and to diverting political power to his supposed elite opponents, including former president Nazarbayev. Other political analysts proposed that Tokayev's decision might stem from a desire to strengthen his power while facing difficult times due to political instability and economic problems.

Vice Justice Minister Alma Mūqanova asserted that Tokayev's second term length would depend on the timing of the enacting of the proposed constitutional amendment. If it would come into effect prior to the presidential elections then Tokayev would serve a nonconsecutive seven-year term in case of reelection.

The ruling Amanat party's Jaña Qazaqstan political faction, in an attempt to soothe public doubts and avoid legal conflicts, proposed to adopt the single seven-year term law prior to snap elections that would prevent Tokayev in this scenario from running for a de facto third term in 2027 and instead grant him an option of holding office no later than 2029 as it was originally intended, to which the members of the faction stressed that it would uphold Kazakhstan's commitment to not have "completely abandoned the super-presidential power." Erjan Jienbaev, deputy head of the Presidential Administration, affirmed that a newly drafted law extending the presidential term to seven years would remain in place for the next elections and that an additional amendment in limiting the possibility of amending the presidential terms for the future would be introduced as well, hence making the law in general permanently unmodifiable and guaranteeing Tokayev's second term to be effectively his last.

On 12 September 2022, President Tokayev under the proposals made by Jaña Qazaqstan legislators then appealed to the Constitutional Council to overlook the amendment draft in extending his term of office. In response, the Constitutional Council ruled in favour of Tokayev's request on 13 September, thus setting the stage for the Parliament's approval. On 16 September, at the joint session of the Parliament, several amendments including one seven-year presidential term were adopted. Deputy Aidos Sarym described the decision as "a democratic norm", outlining that a new president of Kazakhstan will be chosen every seven years. Deputy Erlan Sairov called it the "real direction of democracy" where "one political person cannot run for the presidency for more than one term." Aq Jol Democratic Party deputy Qazybek Isa stressed that the move would prevent "some mistakes that have occurred" within the 30 years of Kazakhstan's independence, expressing his relief for the country having a "second president" and that a new president will take office in seven years. The ratified constitutional amendments were subsequently signed into law by Tokayev on 17 September.

== Candidates ==
Article 54 of the Constitutional Law on Elections stipulates that the Central Election Commission (CEC) establishes the compliance of a presidential candidate as requirements outlined in the Constitution and Constitutional Law "On Elections" within five days from the date of submitting the extract from the supreme body of a republican public association meeting on the candidate's nomination as well as their consent to run for president with the document certifying the candidate's payment of an election fee. The presidential candidate shall deposit an election fee in the amount of 50 statutory minimum wages (3 million tenges) to the account of the CEC. Candidates will receive a payment for being elected as president or receiving at least five per cent of the vote share, as in the case of the death of the candidate. In all other cases, the fee is non-refundable and is transferred to the revenues of the national budget.

=== Registered candidates ===
The CEC carries out the registration of qualified candidates upon submission of the necessary documents which include extracts from the meeting of a public association's supreme body, a candidate's participatory consent, supporting signatures collected by citizens, biographic data of a candidate, declarations of assets and liabilities by the candidate and their spouse, confirmation of a deposited election fee, as well as medical examinations regarding the candidate's state of health.

Registration of candidates started two months before the elections following the nomination and submission of documents to the CEC and ended at 18.00 local time forty days (21 October) before the election day. A total of six candidates were registered by the CEC which consisted of two women and four men, one civil servant, one representative of the commercial sector, four representatives of the non-governmental sector, as well as one representative of a political party.

Candidate name and age, political party	Political office(s)	Announced	Details	Registration date
Kassym-Jomart Tokayev (73); Independent (People's Coalition)	President of Kazakhstan (since 2019); Chairman of the Senate (2007–2011 and 2013–2019); Minister of Foreign Affairs (1994–1999 and 2002–2007); State Secretary of Kazakhstan (2002–2003); Prime Minister of Kazakhstan (1999–2002) Other offices: Chairman of the Assembly of People since 2021; Chairman of Nur Otan in 2022; Member of the Senate from 2007 to 2011 and 2013 to 2019; Director-General of the United Nations Office at Geneva from 2011 to 2013; Deputy Prime Minister in 1999; First Deputy Foreign Minister from 1993 to 1994; Deputy Foreign Minister from 1992 to 1993	1 September 2022 (Campaign)	Backed by Nursultan Nazarbayev, Tokayev was elected in the 2019 presidential election.	12 October 2022
Meiram Qajyken (65); AKD	Leader of Yntymaq (since 2022)	26 September 2022	Head of the Astana School of Economics at the Astana International Science Complex (ISCA); Member of the Amanat Commonwealth of Trade Unions	15 October 2022
Jiguli Dairabaev (71); Auyl	Member of the Supreme Council (1993–1995); Member of the Supreme Soviet (1990–1993) Other offices: Head of the Department of Statistics in Turar Ryskulov District from 1997 to 2001; Director of the "Qorağaty" state farm from 1995 to 1997; Head of the Department of Agriculture in Turar Ryskulov District from 1995 to 1997; Chairman of the board of the Jambyl collective farm in Lugovoi District from 1987 to 1995; Secretary of the Communist Party of Kazakhstan (QKP) committee of the "Algabas" sheep farm in Lugovoi District (1985–1987); Instructor of the Lugovsky District Committee of the QKP from 1984 to 1985; Chairman of the Kamensk Rural Executive Committee from 1980 to 1984; Chairman of the trade union committee of "The Way to Communism" collective farm in Lugovoi District from 1977 to 1980; Instructor of the Lugovoi District Committee of the Komsomol in 1977; Secretary of the Komsomol Committee of "The Way to Communism" collective farm in Lugovoi District from 1974 to 1977	30 September 2022 (Campaign)	Chair of the Agro-Industrial Complex Committee at the Atameken National Chamber of Entrepreneurs; Chair of the Association of Farmers	17 October 2022
Qaraqat Äbden (52); KÄQŪA	Member of the Astana City Mäslihat (2016–2021)	7 October 2022 (Campaign • Website)		19 October 2022
Saltanat Tursynbekova (52); QA–DJ		11 October 2022 (Campaign • Website)		20 October 2022
Nurlan Äuesbaev (69); JSDP	Head of the Astana City Branch of the Nationwide Social Democratic Party (since 2021)	1 October 2022 (Campaign)		20 October 2022

=== Rejected Candidates ===
Candidate	Political party	Political office(s)	Announced	Details
Inga Imanbai	Democratic Party	None	29 September 2022	Inga Imanbai is married to the unregistered Democratic Party's leader Janbolat Mamai. She worked in various opposition newspapers as a journalist where she brought up issues on political prisoners and refugees and is a coordinator of the Human Rights Bureau press center since 2017. On 29 September 2022, Imanbai appealed to the CEC in regard to her candidature which was immediately rejected due to her failing to meet age requirements and experience in the civil service.
Balli Marzec	Independent	Chairman of Foreign Bureau of the Opposition of Kazakhstan	29 September 2022	Kazakh-born Polish citizen Balli Marzec had been involved in opposition since 2002 where she, along with the group of Kazakh diaspora, founded the NGO Kazakh Community Association. Marzec has been involved in political activism in support of civil liberties as well as political prisoners and opposition activists and has dealt with the issues of human rights and democratic changes in Post-Soviet states. She took part in a failed bid for the 2015 Polish presidential election. Marzec applied her candidature several times to the CEC, upon which all were rejected on 2 October 2022 in accordance with the law that made her unqualifiable.
Hairolla Ğabjalilov	OAB	None	11 October 2022	Karakalpakstan-born artist and architect Hairolla Ğabjalilov is known for being one of the first banknote designers of the Kazakhstani tenge in the early 1990s. His nomination from the Association of Oralmans "Asar" was turned down by the CEC on 13 October 2022 on the basis of not being a citizen of Kazakhstan by birth and not having enough experience in civil service, to which Ğabjalilov in response slammed the CEC's decision as being "fictitious" and insisted that true reasoning of him being barred was due to being a "potential opponent".
Talgat Erğaliev	Union of Builders	Member of the Mäjilis (2012–2016)	10 October 2022	Talgat Erğaliev who previously attempted to run in 2019, was nominated by the Union of Builders public association on 10 October 2022, for which he has headed since 2010. On 13 October 2022 the CEC rejected Erğaliev's candidacy due to working in the civil service for just a little over three years, below the five-year minimum requirement.
Fatima Bizaqova	Practical Psychology	None	11 October 2022	Psychologist and business coach Fatima Bizaqova is a chairwoman of Practical Psychology and became the organisation's presidential nominee on 11 October 2022. She subsequently applied her documents to the CEC. On 13 October 2022, Bizaqova's candidacy was rejected by the CEC for having no experience in public office.

=== Nominations ===
The deadline for nominating presidential candidates begins on the day following the announcement of elections and shall end at 18:00 local time two months before the election is held. The nomination of presidential candidates by republican public associations is conducted on the behalf of their supreme bodies. A public association can nominate only one candidate, who is not obliged to be a member of the given public association with the selection process being taken by the majority of votes from the members of the supreme body of a republican public association.

The nominations of candidates took place starting on 23 September and concluded on 11 October 2022. There were in total 12 candidates nominated for the presidency with two persons being from political parties while the rest being from public associations. The CEC at the time of the deadline for nominations registered five candidates with seven still undergoing the document process.

==== People's Coalition (HK) ====
Senate chairman Mäulen Äşimbaev on 29 September 2022 stated that Tokayev is supported both by Amanat and other parties, reiterating that Tokayev would make his decision on the nominating offer, to which he recalled that the upcoming congresses by political parties would consider the issue of presidential nominations. Aida Jeksenova, head of the El Dauysy Public Foundation, assessed the possibility of Tokayev being solely nominated by Amanat, People's Party, and Aq Jol parties as a candidate noting the unusual move in party congresses being held all on the same dates.

On 5 October 2022, a number of public associations announced their interest in nominating Tokayev as a candidate, to which in response, Tokayev unveiled his personal interest in being nominated from "a broad coalition of socio-political forces", insisting that the presidential nomination offers from various republican associations and political parties indicated "a significant increase in three and a half years of support by citizens for the implemented and planned transformations." Amanat chairman Erlan Qoşanov on 6 October revealed that the party along with several political associations had initially agreed to form the People's Coalition in support of Tokayev. That same day, the 1st People's Coalition Forum was held which was attended by 2,000 representatives of political parties and more than 30 republican associations. From there, Qoşanov presented Tokayev's nomination where he outlined that the "mobilisation of the leading political forces on the basis of common goals will motivate the country" and that a vote for Tokayev would be a "choice of the true patriots". Speaking at the forum event, Tokayev called the upcoming elections "a very important campaign" that would "define the path" of Kazakhstan's development and highlighted the importance of the coalition including leading political parties, public organizations, and movements which covered all social layers, pledging to maintain his stance in being "politically neutral". He also named the seven principles that would govern the nation. Justice Minister Qanat Musin reiterated that Tokayev may be registered as a candidate only from "a particular organisation" and remarking that a coalition is simply "a political concept [and] not a legal one."

===== Amanat =====
On 7 September 2022, Amanat chairman Erlan Qoşanov announced that his party would nominate incumbent president Tokayev as a candidate in the election, to which Qoşanov described him as "a worthy person, a worthy candidate" and that the overall decision on a presidential nomination offer would be made by Tokayev. In spite of Tokayev recognising himself as an independent after previously leaving his Amanat membership in April, Qoşanov added that the Amanat has not deprived him of the opportunity to be nominated. Furthermore, Justice Minister Qanat Musin answering legal questions acknowledged that Tokayev may be nominated regardless of his party affiliation or not.

The 24th Amanat Extraordinary Congress was held on 6 October 2022 that was attended by more than 1,200 people which included 700 party delegates. From there, Qoşanov expressed the need for a "worthy leader" to achieve the "great goals of the state", and in turn proposed Tokayev for nomination as he urged all Kazakh citizens to unite around his progressive reforms. As a result, Tokayev was unanimously selected to be the presidential nominee by the delegates.

===== Aq Jol Democratic Party (AJDP) =====
Chairman Azat Peruashev revealed Aq Jol's intent of choosing a presidential nominee, saying that there are "worthy opponents for the head of state".

At the 19th Aq Jol Democratic Party, Extraordinary Congress that took place on 6 October 2022 in Astana, 126 party delegates took part in the voting for a nominee, to which Peruashev announced that the plenum had still not reached a consensus on choosing a presidential candidate, noting that the party congress has the power in making a decision. Peruashev himself endorsed President Tokayev for nomination while six candidates originally expressed interest to be nominated. That was eventually left to just four candidatures being considered by the Aq Jol for nomination, to which as a result of a secret ballot election, Tokayev received the majority of 74 votes. That was followed by Serik Erubaev with 23 votes, Asqar Sadyqov with 17 votes, and Sanduğaş Düisenova with 11 votes. From there, Peruashev remarked that Tokayev's proposals were "consonant" with Aq Jol's programme, adding that a president should not only serve "one party" but instead "the whole nation".

Declared

- Serik Erubaev,
- Asqar Sadyqov,
- Sanduğaş Düisenova, journalist

===== People's Party of Kazakhstan (QHP) =====
The People's Party of Kazakhstan (QHP) initially expressed its support for President Tokayev's announced political changes on 1 September 2022, as well as not ruling out nominating Tokayev for the election.

On 6 October 2022, the 21st congress of the People's Party of Kazakhstan was hosted in Astana with the QHP chairman Ermūhamet Ertısbaev proposing Tokayev's nomination, where he stressed the need for "someone with extensive experience in government and international politics" in the context of "geopolitical collapse" and noted that the Tokayev's policies "fully corresponds to the ideology and values" of the QHP. Following Ertisbaev's speech, the party delegates unanimously voted for Tokayev to be the QHP nominee.

==== "Auyl" People's Democratic Patriotic Party (AHDDP) ====
At the 20th Auyl People's Democratic Patriotic Party, Extraordinary Congress held on 30 September 2022 in Astana, Jiguli Dairabaev was nominated as the first presidential candidate in which the decision was supported by overwhelmingly 67 delegates with just two voting against. From there, Dairabaev pledged to put "all efforts into the development of Kazakhstan and the agro-industrial complex".

Declared

- Jiguli Dairabaev, chair of the Agro-Industrial Complex Committee at the Atameken National Chamber of Entrepreneurs, chair of the Association of Farmers

==== Nationwide Social Democratic Party (JSDP) ====
On 1 October 2022, the Nationwide Social Democratic Party (JSDP) at its 19th Extraordinary Congress nominated Nurlan Auesbaev as a candidate for president.

==== "Amanat" Commonwealth of Trade Unions (AKD) ====
Meiram Qajyken, head of the Institute of Economic Research in the Astana International Scientific Complex, unveiled his nomination on 3 October 2022 by the "Amanat" Commonwealth of Trade Unions following a subsequent joint meeting of the organisation's executive and central committee. Qajyken cited his previous experience in working with various trade union associations in Kazakhstan and that his election programme was prepared though not ruling out the need of adjusting it whilst taking into account the wishes of supporters.

- Meiram Qajyken, Leader of Yntymaq (2022–present), Chairman of the Committee for Industry and Scientific and Technical Development under the Ministry of Industry and Trade (2005–2007), Adviser to the Prime Minister and Head of the Production Sphere and Infrastructure Department of the Prime Minister's Office (2003–2005), Head of the Department of Economics of Pavlodar Region (2002–2003), Head of Department of the Ministry of Economy (1999–2000), Head of Department and Deputy Head of Department of the Agency for Strategic Planning and Reforms (1998–1999), Deputy Head of the Department of Industry of Pavlodar Region (1996–1997), Adviser to the Äkim and Deputy Head of the Department of Economics and Finance of the Pavlodar Regional Akimat (1994–1996), Chief Specialist and Head of the Department of Economics of Pavlodar Region (1992–1994)

==== National Alliance of Professional Social Workers (KÄQŪA) ====
At the meeting of the National Alliance of Professional Social Workers (KÄJŪA) held on 7 October 2022, the NGO nominated public figure Qaraqat Äbden for the presidency which was reported due to the need of KÄJŪA to achieve and promote the issues and protections of interests by the socially vulnerable segments of Kazakhstan's citizens.

==== Mūqalmas ====
On 7 October 2022, Nūrjan Ältaev applied for his presidential candidacy documents from the Mūqalmas public association after facing accusations of allegedly falsifying the protocol of the Mūqalmas' supreme body meeting by the organisation activists who insisted that Ältaev was not supported by "some leaders" of the Mūqalmas' branches.

Declared

- Nūrjan Ältaev, Leader of El Tıregı (2020–present), Member of the Mäjilis (2019–2020), Vice Minister of Labor and Social Protection of the Population (2018–2019), Vice Minister of Agriculture (2017–2018)

==== Others ====
- Union of Builders of Kazakhstan (QQO): Talgat Erğaliev, chairman of the Union of Builders of Kazakhstan, was nominated as the presidential candidate and subsequently applied for the registration documents on 10 October 2022.
- Halyq Demografiasy (HD): On 10 October 2022, Jūmatai Äliev submitted his candidacy on the behalf of the nomination by the Halyq Demografiasy public association.
- Association of Oralmans "Asar" (OAB): Hairolla Ğabjalilov on 11 October 2022 presented his participatory documents as a nominee from the Association of Oralmans "Asar".
- Qazaq analary–dästürge jol (QA–DJ): Human rights activist Saltanat Tūrsynbekova became a presidential nominee from the Qazaq analary–dästürge jol public association on 11 October 2022.
- Kazakhstan League of Football Fans (QFÄL): The Kazakhstan League of Football Fans nominated Baqyt Jañabaev as its candidate on 11 October 2022. Jañabaev voiced his interest in taking part in the election as "a new trend" rather to remain "a silent spectator".
- Practical Psychology (TP): Fatima Bizaqova was the last candidate to be nominated for president by the Practical Psychology organisation on 11 October 2022.

==== Self-nominees ====
Declared

- Jasaral Quanyşälin, Leader of Alğa Qazaqstan (2022–present), Head of the Aktobe Regional Department of Information and Public Consent (1999–2003), Director of the Aktobe Regional Archive (1999), Deputy Head of the Aktobe Regional Department for Demography and Migration (1998–1999), Member of the Supreme Council (1994–1995), Chairman of the Azat Civil Movement (1992–1994), First Deputy Chairman of the Azat Civil Movement (1991–1992)
- Hasen Qojahmetov, candidate for president in 2015 and 1991, Leader of the Azat Civil Movement (1994–present), and Leader of the Jeltoqsan National Democratic Party (1991–1992)
- Serik Äbdirahmanov, Member of the Mäjilis (1999–2007), Member of the Supreme Council (1994–1995), Adviser to the President (1991–1992), Deputy Chairman of the Alma-Ata City Executive Committee (1990–1991), First Secretary of the Central Committee of the Komsomol (1981–1987), Member of the Supreme Soviet of the Kazakh SSR (1980–1993)
- Uälihan Qaisarov, candidate for Mäjilis deputy in 2016, 2012, and 2007, Member of the Central Committee of the Democratic Party Adilet (2012–2013), First Deputy Chairman of the Democratic Party Adilet (2011–2012), Member of the Nationwide Social Democratic Party and Azat presidium of the political council (2009–2011), candidate for 2005 presidential elections, Chairman of the Abyroi Kazakh Party of Social Protection (2004), Senator from Karaganda Region (1999–2005)

Withdrawn

- Amirjan Qosanov, candidate for president in 2019, General Secretary of the Azat Party (2009–2013), First Deputy Chairman of the Nationwide Social Democratic Party (2006–2009), Chairman of the Republican People's Party's Executive Committee (2000–2001), Deputy Chairman of the Republican People's Party (1998–2000), Member of the Commission under the President on Issues of Pardon (1994)

=== Qualification ===
The CEC overlooks the qualifications of candidates in accordance with the Constitution by acknowledging the person's proficiency in the Kazakh language after applying for the presidential race. On 28 September 2022, CEC secretary Muqtar Erman announced the formation of the linguistic commission, a group consisting of six well-known scientists who oversee the candidate's fluency (with the exception of the incumbent president) in the Kazakh language. A candidate is required to undergo a process established by the CEC which is:

1. Write an assignment on a topic proposed by the linguistic commission, no more than two pages;
2. Read printed text proposed by the linguistic commission, no more than three pages;
3. Publicly speak on a topic set by the linguistic commission for at least 15 minutes.

Candidate	Linguistic exam				Result
Candidate	1. Essay topic	2. Excerpt reading	3. Presentational topic	Date	Result
Kassym-Jomart Tokayev	Did not participate				
Meiram Qajyken	Қазіргі заманғы жаһандық мәселелер ("Contemporary Global Issues")	Мұхтар Әуезовтің «Абай жолы» ("'The Path of Abai' by Mukhtar Auezov")	Ырыс алды – ынтымақ ("The start of abundance is solidarity")	8 October 2022	Demonstrated fluency by a unanimous vote
Jiguli Dairabaev	Менің елім, менің жерім ("My country, my land.")	Poems by Abai Qunanbaiuly	Күшіміз – бірлікте ("Our strength is in unity")	8 October 2022	Demonstrated fluency by a unanimous vote
Nurlan Auesbaev	Түркістан – ер түріктің бесігі ("Turkistan – the cradle of Turks.")	Жүсіпбек Аймауытұлының «Ақбілек» ("'Clever' by Jüsipbek Aimauytuly")	Ана тілім – асыл қазынам ("My mother tongue is my true treasure")	10 October 2022	Demonstrated fluency by a unanimous vote
Qaraqat Äbden	Тіл – халықтың алтын діңгегі ("Language is the golden pillar of the people.")	Ілияс Есенберлиннің «Көшпенділер» ("'The Nomads.' by Ilias Esenberlin")	Азат елдің еңсесі биік ("The figure of a free country is high")	10 October 2022	Demonstrated fluency by a unanimous vote
Nūrjan Ältaev	Біртұтас Алаш идеясы ("The idea of a unified Alash")	Ілияс Есенберлиннің «Көшпенділер» ("'The Nomads' by Ilias Esenberlin")	Бабалар аманаты ("Legacy of our Forefathers")	11 October 2022	Demonstrated fluency by a unanimous vote
Jūmatai Äliev	Түркістан – ер түріктің бесігі ("Turkistan – the cradle of Turks")	Мұқағали Мақатаевтың «Аққулар ұйықтағанда» ("'When swans sleep' by Mukaghali Makatayev")	Адал еңбек – игілік көзі ("Honest work is a source of fortune.")	12 October 2022	Demonstrated fluency by a majority vote with two abstentions
Baqyt Jañabaev	Экология – бүгіннің басты мәселесі ("Ecology is the main problem of today.")	Міржақып Дулатовтың «Оян, қазақ!» ("'Wake up, Kazakh!' by Mirjaqip Dulatuli)	Бабалар аманаты ("Legacy of our Forefathers.")	13 October 2022	Demonstrated fluency by a majority vote with one abstention

The CEC also issues a final decision on the candidate's eligibility (a compliance) to participate in the election by determining if the candidate meets all of the necessary following requirements:

Candidate	Citizen by birth	Experience in civil service	Higher education	Valid nomination	Fluent in Kazakh	Summary
Kassym-Jomart Tokayev	Yes ✓	Yes ✓	Yes ✓	Yes ✓	Yes ✓	Compliance established on 8 October 2022
Meiram Qajyken	Yes ✓	Yes ✓	Yes ✓	Yes ✓	Yes ✓	Compliance established on 8 October 2022
Jiguli Dairabaev	Yes ✓	Yes ✓	Yes ✓	Yes ✓	Yes ✓	Compliance established on 9 October 2022
Nurlan Auesbaev	Yes ✓	Yes ✓	Yes ✓	Yes ✓	Yes ✓	Compliance established on 10 October 2022
Qaraqat Äbden	Yes ✓	Yes ✓	Yes ✓	Yes ✓	Yes ✓	Compliance established on 11 October 2022
Nūrjan Ältaev	Yes ✓	Yes ✓	Yes ✓	No ✗	Yes ✓	Compliance suspended on 12 October 2022
Jūmatai Äliev	Yes ✓	Yes ✓	Yes ✓	Yes ✓	Yes ✓	Compliance established on 12 October 2022
Saltanat Tūrsynbekova	Yes ✓	Yes ✓	Yes ✓	Yes ✓	Yes ✓	Compliance established on 12 October 2022
Baqyt Jañabaev	Yes ✓	Yes ✓	Yes ✓	Yes ✓	Yes ✓	Compliance established on 13 October 2022

=== Signatures ===
A presidential candidate is required to collect support from at least one per cent of the electorate (118,273 signatures) proportionally representing two-thirds of regions, and cities of republican significance including the capital of Astana. The collection of signatures in support of a candidate is organised by agents and executed in signature sheets that are issued by the Central Election Commission (CEC) no later than five days after the candidate has undergone thorough eligibility with the requirements towards documents in regard to his or her nomination.

Candidates began collecting signatures following the end of the nomination period with the verification of them alongside the registration of candidates being completed by 21 October 2022.

Party	Candidate	Number of signatures				Reporting date
Party	Candidate	Original	Verified	Valid	Total submitted	Reporting date
HK	Kassym-Jomart Tokayev	140,167	141,045	281,212	399,809	12 October 2022
AKD	Meiram Qajyken	—	—	120,055	122,184	15 October 2022
Auyl	Jiguli Dairabaev	—	—	119,975	125,081	17 October 2022
KÄQŪA	Qaraqat Äbden	—	—	118,418	121,314	19 October 2022
QA–DJ	Saltanat Tūrsynbekova	—	—	118,434	119,316	20 October 2022
JSDP	Nurlan Auesbaev	—	—	119,197	120,908	20 October 2022
QFÄL	Baqyt Jañabaev	—	—	4,054	58,889	21 October 2022
HD	Jūmatai Äliev	—	—	36,776	187,723	21 October 2022

=== Fundraising ===
A presidential campaign fund consists of the candidate's own finance and donations from the nominated republican public association with a total amount not exceeding 12,000 statutory minimum wages (720 million tenges). While voluntary donations from the public and organisations in Kazakhstan must not exceed 15,000 statutory minimum wages (900 million tenges).

On 28 September 2022, the Central Election Commission (CEC) adopted a resolution allocating a total of 10,312,600 tenges from the republican budget for each candidate that would cover needs in:

- Speeches with programs on television and radio, as well as the publication of 2 articles in print periodicals (9,012,600 tenges)
- Holding public pre-election events and issuing campaign materials (800,000 tenges)
- Transport expenses (500,000 tenges)

== Campaign ==
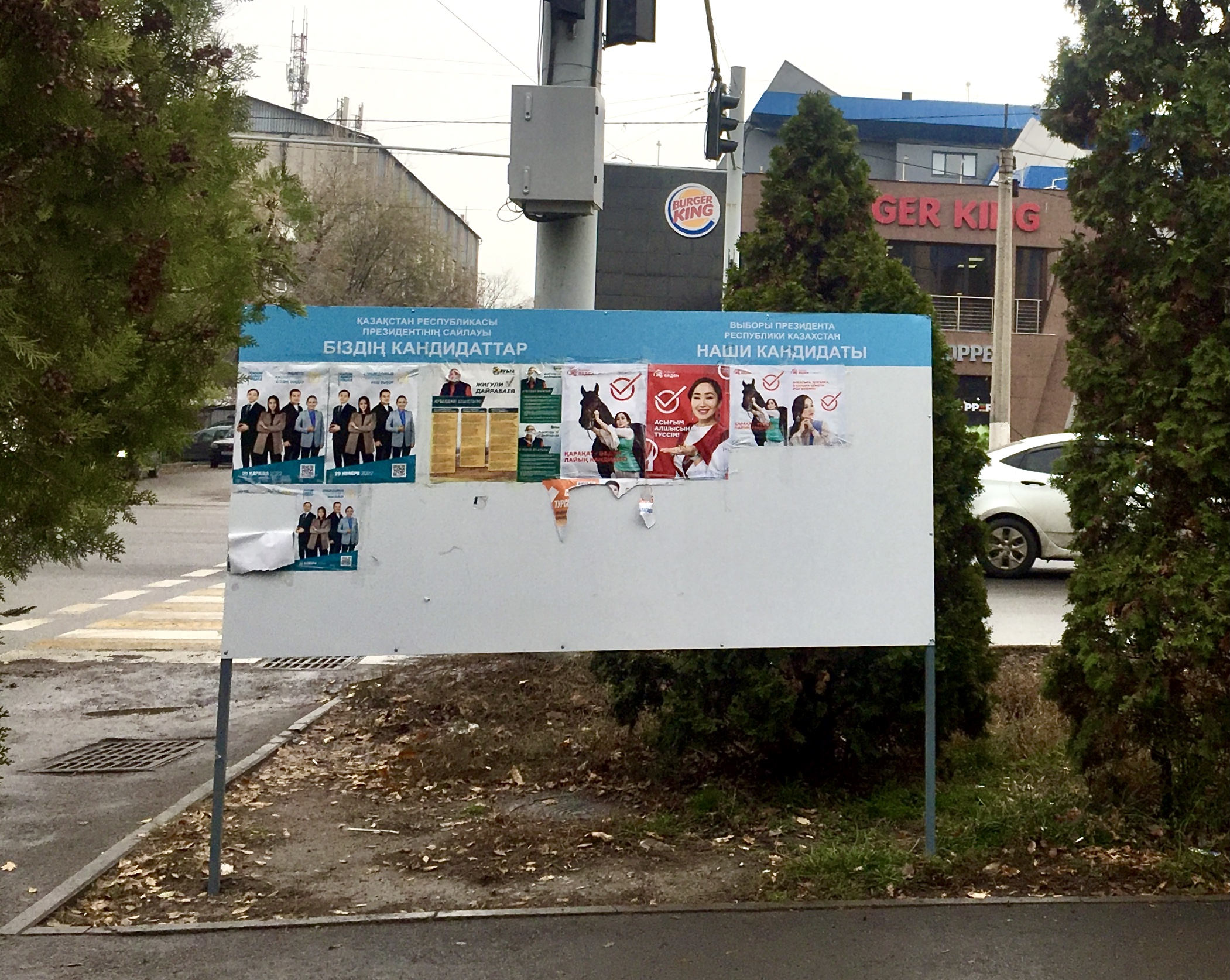
Bulletin board of the 2022 presidential candidates in Almaty

Campaigning officially kicked off on 21 October 2022 at 18:00, with presidential candidates opening up their public election headquarters across Kazakhstan's regions. The Central Election Commission (CEC) on 22 October held a meeting with the representatives of campaign headquarters regarding the rules of canvassing in which the CEC issued a warning about the candidates' expulsion if laws are violated and that all financial transactions must be conducted openly with the campaign headquarters issuing reports of election spending.

=== Kassym-Jomart Tokayev ===
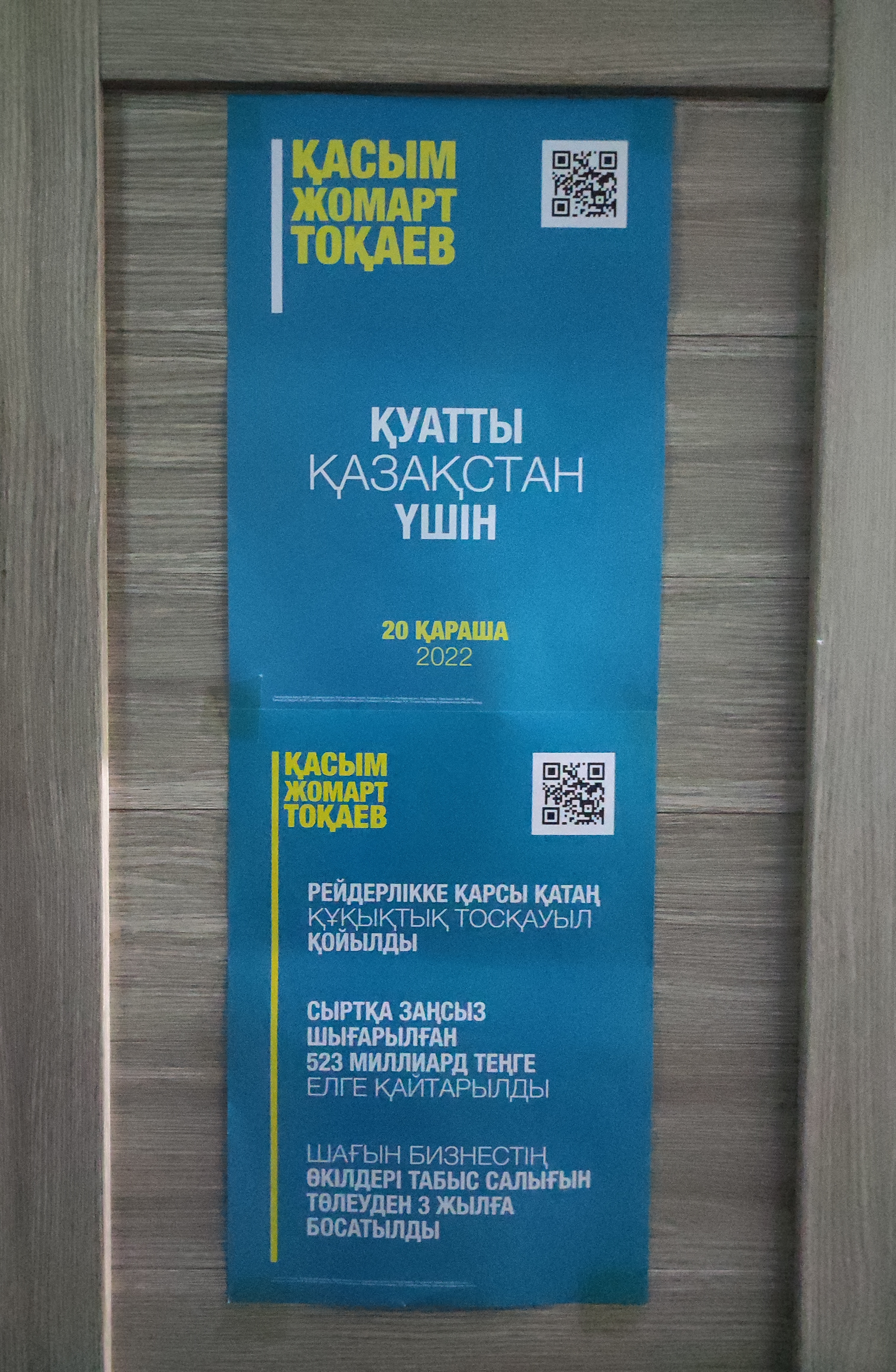
Poster promoting Tokayev's campaign platform, Astana, 2 November 2022

Incumbent president nominee Kassym-Jomart Tokayev initially announced his run for reelection during the 1 September 2022 State of the Nation Address. When signing a decree on the date for the presidential election on 21 September, he hinted that his election manifesto would outline "new initiatives aimed at achieving socio-economic progress". After becoming a nominee for the People's Coalition, Tokayev stated that he would present his election platform in the "near future" and that it would include measures for the transformation of Kazakhstan and the improvement of its welfare of citizens, as well as a balanced foreign policy to ensure "regional and global security".

The election programme by Tokayev was made public on 28 October 2022 upon the launch of his campaign website, which consisted of three blocks that were: Fair State, Fair Economy, Fair Society (Kazakh: Әділетті мемлекет, Әділетті экономика, Әділетті қоғам). Tokayev poised himself as a supporter of a political system to be continued under his previous stance of "a strong president, an influential parliament and an accountable government." His programme supported political changes for the formation of "a fair state" where enacted policies would be made on a "consolidated position of the people and the authorities", efficient government performance for citizens, an independent judicial system, protection of citizens' rights, and ensuring national security. For economic policies, Tokayev stressed the need for radical changes for the development of the economy by reducing state interference in the economy whilst at the same time combatting oligarchy, a balanced and transparent fiscal policy, rural development for agriculture, expanding transport corridors, an independent energy system not limited to sustainable energy, infrastructure and regional development, production of high tech goods, and continued digital transformation in Kazakhstan. Tokayev also expressed his emphasis on social issues as being a "basic condition" for building a "Fair Kazakhstan", noting that social investments towards citizens would become "the basis of economic growth" in which he pledged to provide affordable and quality education, improving the healthcare system, strengthening national sovereignty, opening more possibilities for youth participation in government, and the protection of the environment.

Tokayev's campaigning in the election was accompanied by members of his election headquarters, beginning with the visit to Abai Region on 28 October where his representing campaign members met with aqsaqals, intelligentsia, college students, and blue-collar workers.

=== Meiram Qajyken ===
At the opening of the campaign headquarters on 21 October 2022, Meiram Qajyken, leader of Yntymaq and "Amanat" Commonwealth of Trade Unions nominee, unveiled the main directions of his election programme to which civil society and social partnership were described to be the main basis of it.

His manifesto titled "The root of prosperity is solidarity" (Kazakh: Игілік түбірі – ынтымақ) included calls for cultural unification of all Kazakhstan's ethnicities, broader access to high-quality education, decentralisation of public administration with more decision-making functions to civil society, independence of the judiciary and increased national defence, stronger independent trade unions, social policies with healthcare and social protection development along with working conditions and wage increases, modernisation within the economic sphere, increased foreign bilateral agreement and stronger economic and political sovereignty.

Qajyken began his campaign on 22 October in Pavlodar Region due to the region's industrial economic status and met with young people, labour workers, entrepreneurs, as well as representatives of trade unions.

=== Jiguli Dairabaev ===
The election programme of Jiguli Dairabaev, nominee for the Auyl People's Democratic Patriotic Party, included principles of "steppe democracy", high spiritual and moral culture, a strong agrarian sector and strong regions to which he advocated for more infrastructure development towards rural villages to turn Kazakhstan into an "agrarian power". Dairabaev voiced his support towards a revival of the Agro-Industrial Complex and gentrification of villages, presidential guarantees for agricultural producers and employees, more social assistance for social workers, develop an urban network of consumer societies and cooperatives to allow for cheaper food products to citizens, and providing insurance to agro-industrial complex investors.

On 23 October, Dairabaev paid his first campaign visit to the "Shapagat" communal market in Astana where he met with sellers and buyers to which he presented his election platform and raised the issues of growing food prices in Kazakhstan.

=== Qaraqat Äbden ===
National Alliance of Professional Social Workers nominee Qaraqat Äbden campaigned for improving the living standards of Kazakh citizens and providing a decent life for families with the stance of the "main wealth of the state" being a person itself. Her published election manifesto, which was self-described to be "socially oriented", particularly towards families, children, youth and elder people: called for strengthening the institution of the family, expanding free leisure activities and construction of educational facilities. Äbden's manifesto argued that culture and upbringing, education and science, health care and social protection were "the basis and guarantee of the successful development of any society."

Äbden in her first campaign trip made a visit to the places of Qosşy and Qoiandy near Astana on 22 October, where she discussed issues with voters and presented her manifesto. On 1 November, Äbden proposed a ban on Halloween in Kazakhstan to which she cited the following 2022 Seoul Halloween crowd crush and urged young people to instead celebrate and popularise the existing Kazakh national and public holidays.

The most major controversy that surrounded Qaraqat Äbden's campaign was because of her suggestion to tax Kazakh women that are in transnational marriages.

=== Saltanat Tūrsynbekova ===
Saltanat Tursynbekova after her nomination from the Qazaq analary–dästürge jol stressed the need in adhering to "the strategy outlined by Tokayev" and that her campaigning would focus on social issues, not ruling the issues of security regarding "the situation in international politics". Tursynbekova's mainly campaigned on the issue of the rule of law, in which she advocated for public trust in justice, noting the rise of domestic violence and child abuse in Kazakhstan. Tursynbekova in her election programme addressed proposals in judicial and legal reform, public security, democratisation and modernisation of political system, strengthening the institution of the family, social protection of the population, sustainable business support and economic development.

On 26 October 2022, Tursynbekova began her campaign trail in the city of Karaganda, where she held meetings with human rights activists, lawyers, undergraduates, victims of domestic violence and members of various NGOs working in the field of human rights protection.

=== Nurlan Auesbaev ===
Nurlan Äuesbaev, the first and only registered candidate from the oppositional Nationwide Social Democratic Party since its founding, campaigned under the motto of "Freedom. Justice. Solidarity!" (Kazakh: Еркіндік. Әділдік. Ынтымақ!), where he addressed issues for the past thirty years of Kazakhstan's independence primarily taking an aim of the COVID-19 pandemic impact and insisted the values of social democracy would solve the growing subsequent problems sparked by "oligarchs and foreign politicians". His electoral platform called for decentralisation of the executive branch, the return of offshore assets held by the "ruling class" in an effort to combat oligarchy, improving the standard of living by taking into account each citizen's need, and increasing sovereignty through trade negotiations while maintaining status quo of neutrality.

Äuesbaev conducted his first campaign on 22 October 2022 in the city of Shakhtinsk in the Karaganda Region, where met with workers and focused on the priorities of his election platform.

=== Issues ===
==== Political reforms ====
Tokayev pledged to continue his current political reforms at building Kazakhstan as "a stable state with an optimal balance of all branches of government", voicing his support for a nonrenewable seven-year presidential term with the president being nonpartisan, formation of a Constitutional Court to ensure citizens' rights, and a system of local government with direct elections of akims (only in cities and districts)

Äuesbaev called for changing Kazakhstan's system of government from a presidential to a semi-presidential republic with the lower chamber Mäjilis being responsible for the formation of a cabinet, abolition of the Senate leading to a unicameral Parliament, increased mandates in the Mäjilis with its deputy seats elected 50% proportionally and 50% from single-member districts.

Qajyken promised to decentralise the Kazakh government by allowing for direct elections of akims at all levels and proposed for every rural village to have its own separate legislative bodies. He also suggested for the position of Prime Minister be fully abolished and leave the President with more decision-making powers over the ministerial cabinet.

Dairabaev stressed the need for greater representation of mass media, opposition leaders, public figures, and cultural, scientific and educational figures in politics and government.

Abden proposed to create the Ministry of Family and Demography, citing a lack of communication between "competent departments".

==== Kazakh language ====
Tokayev, Qajyken, and Dairabaev, voiced their support for the increased use of the Kazakh language in public spheres, with Tokayev also stressing the need to combat linguistic discrimination primarily against Russian speakers in Kazakhstan as well.

==== National security ====
Tokayev pledged to modernise Kazakh Armed Forces for increasing territorial protection as well as increasing Kazakhstan's contribution to international security under the United Nations framework.

Dairabaev suggested that "traditional national hospitality" should serve as the basis for Kazakhstan's positive image by the world rather than its "weakness", arguing that Kazakhstan's power should be based on "peacefulness and good neighborliness".

Qajyken called for the modernisation of the military, state defenses, and improvement of the mobilisation system as well, assessing the need in adopting a new military doctrine for the training of personnel. In regard to Kazakhstan's foreign policy, Qajyken noted it as being "turbulent" and expressed the need for the country to be "strong" both in terms of politically and militarily.

Äuesbaev supported continued Kazakhstan's commitment to nuclear disarmament and demilitarisation as an effective tool in combatting terrorism, illegal drug trade, arms trafficking, and illegal immigration. He also called for a moderate form of protectionism in "strategic sectors" as well as continued neutral foreign policy.

==== Economy ====
Tokayev proposed to increase the assets of the Samruk-Kazyna wealth fund to $100 billion, reducing the state presence in the economy to 14% by 2025, attract in $150 billion foreign investments, demonopolise the economy, increase the employment rate, and raising worker salaries along with the national minimum wage to correlate with the inflation rate. He suggested adopting a new Tax Code that would ensure a fairer taxation system, increased taxes on luxury goods as well as tax exemptions for companies to subsidise their costs of increasing employee salaries. Tokayev also promised to invest more in agriculture and focus more on the production of high-tech goods.

Äuesbaev promised if elected to launch criminal investigations against Kazakh oligarchs by redistributing their assets to medium-sized entrepreneurs, gradually nationalise businesses involved in natural resources, increase taxes on corporations, and implement an effective competition law including breaking up the Samruk-Kazyna national wealth fund into smaller industry state holdings.

Qajyken called for the development of entrepreneurship in Kazakhstan, by increasing the share of manufacturing industries and agriculture, as well as small and medium-sized businesses, arguing that independent entrepreneurs would make it impossible for oligarchs to exist in business. He iterated that private foreign ownership of land should be limited.

Dairabaev argued that the agricultural sector could become a main "driver of the economy" and supported the revival of the Agro-Industrial Complex. He also suggested that corruption and shadow economy should be combatted through people's mindset through their "spiritual and moral education".

Tursynbekova proposed to develop a state program for demononpolisation to encourage market competition and entrepreneurship, as well as to form a commission in overseeing the privatisation legality of strategically important facilities and the sale of natural resources in Kazakhstan.

==== Infrastructure development ====
Tokayev pledged to provide every family with clean drinking water, high-quality road infrastructure, 5G cellular data and high-speed internet for cities and regional centers (including national and regional highways as well). Tokayev also announced that 111 million square meters of housing would be built within seven years and the reconstruction of existing residential buildings and communal infrastructure. For rural areas, Tokayev promised to reconstruct 35,000 km of irrigation canals and pay more attention to water storage reservoirs.

Äuesbaev stressed the need in constructing more schools and hospitals regardless of commercial benefit. He proposed to revise housing programs that according to him currently favour "developers and their pockets" which led to an increase in the cost of homes. Äuesbaev promised that state subsidising of affordable mortgages would continue under his administration, under the help of local budgets and supervision of local mäslihats (local assemblies).

Äbden proposed to adopt special legislation to consolidate the construction of educational facilities by synchronizing them with population growth. She expressed the need in providing an urban design of street infrastructure oriented towards elderly people.

Dairabaev outlined that for each rural village to include its own production, social and engineering infrastructure, an equal and fair distribution of "common benefits" between capital and regions would be needed.

Tursynbekova supported development of a program that would aim at constructing public housing and suburban homes, which would include social infrastructure.

==== Education ====
Tokayev and Tursynbekova expressed his desire in making education affordable and high quality in Kazakhstan, with Tokayev proposing to provide free meals for children from low-income families in kindergartens and free hot meals for all primary school students, solving the shortage of classroom space and college dormitories, rental programs of school computers for students from low-income families, increased student scholarships, renovate at least 1,000 schools to modern standards, and provide free access to world's digital libraries for students.

Qajyken supported in improvement of the education system in Kazakhstan, by providing universal access for all schoolchildren, professional standards of trade schools, and modernising higher and postgraduate education.

Äbden called for free education for all students and pupils, and for scholarships to be tied with wages. She also supported the idea of tuition-free post-secondary learning activities and programs.

==== Social care ====
Tokayev announced that he would provide more funding to social programs such as the National Fund for Children and Kazakhstan Halkyna, increase support for persons of special needs, disabled people, and unemployed citizens as well as benefits to 45% of their income, increase childcare payments, subsidising 30% of utility costs for citizens in need, and adopting a Law on the Bankruptcy of Natural Persons.

Äuesbaev proposed more social spending to be allocated for healthcare and education by approximately 5–7% of the GDP each, saying that doctors and teachers should be "the most privileged part of society".

Äbden paid more attention to the elderly specifically, proposing a special programme that would allow senior retirees to travel around Kazakhstan at preferential rates. She also promised if elected to form the Ministry of

Dairabaev proposed raising the status of farmworkers with the provision for them and their families to receive the necessary amount of social support.

Qajyken pledged to modernise Kazakhstan's pension system and preserve its mixed model, solve the issue of early retirements for employees in hazardous workspaces, as well as reducing the women's retirement age, while Tursynbekova called for it to be specifically lowered to 68 years of age.

==== Justice system ====
To restore people's confidence in public trust, Tokayev advocated for an independent court and justice system such as abandoning repressive methods towards citizens by strengthening their rights under criminal prosecution and expanding alternative uses of punishment to imprisonment types.

Äuesbaev took a harsh aim specifically towards corruption: calling for mandatory income and expenditures declarations for all officials and lawmakers, a criminal article for illegal enrichment, a digital view of public fund movements, protection for journalists covering anti-corruption investigations, and a maximum term punishment for corruption crimes without parole.

Tursynbekova stressed the need to establish an effective justice system by developing alternative methods of dispute and conflict resolution, adopting a law "On Private Detective Activity", an improved anti-corruption programme, increased priority in preventing crimes, and stricter legislation of intentional offenses and domestic violence in the country, formation of a state commission to oversee activities of responsible officials, and legislation in criminal liability of officials' property not corresponding to their salaries.

=== Criticism and response by the opposition ===
Tokayev's decision on holding a snap presidential election faced criticism and backlash specifically from opposition groups. The unregistered Democratic Party of Kazakhstan in a statement expressed its opposition to snap elections which it described as being "unconstitutional" and instead called for the presidential election to be held after political reforms have taken place as well as political prisoners in Kazakhstan being released. The Oyan, Qazaqstan civic movement refused to recognise the snap election including its outcome as being legitimate, criticising Tokayev for using "Nazarbayev's methods of seizing power" after his announcement of the presidential vote.

At the Coalition of Democratic Forces of Kazakhstan conference held in Almaty on 5 September 2022 which was attended by various opposition figures and civil activists, who opposed in holding of snap presidential elections to which Rysbek Sarsenbai, brother of Altynbek Sarsenbayuly, at the meeting accused Tokayev's proposals as being "restoration of Nazarbayev's authoritarian regime". The Coalition of Democratic Forces pledged to hold protest rallies in response, although according to attendee Nūrjan Ältaev, it had not ruled out potentially fielding an opposition candidate in case their demands were not initially met.

== Controversies ==
=== Forced campaign advertising ===
Current Time TV reported a scandal on 8 September 2022 in which Kazakh scholars at the L. N. Gumilyov Eurasian National University complained about being coerced by the university management and Ministry of Higher Education to positively promote President Tokayev's message about his reforms for fear of losing their jobs. The university denied the claims of forced advertising and stated that the allegations are "personal opinion". According to the director of the Alash Institute at the Eurasian National University Sultan Han Aqquly, the Higher Education Ministry introduced a "Proposal to the Media Plan" document that included the topic of the seminar, the name of a television channel that would broadcast it, as well as names of speakers. Sultan Han Aqquly described the impossibility of holding elections in conditions where the administrative resource is concentrated "in the hands of one of the candidates."

In mid-October 2022, a video which went viral on social media showed crowded students at the ruling Amanat party's youth wing office of Jastar Ruhy in Almaty, with the person in the video claiming people being offered monthly paid work and were subsequently required to sign a special waiver which would recognise them as election canvassers for Tokayev, an accusation that was denied by the Jastar Ruhy.

=== Internet and media blackouts ===
In late September 2022, Internet access in Kazakhstan was repeatedly disrupted. The incident coincided with an article published by the Public Eye that revealed President Tokayev's use of foreign money laundering in the ownership of oil and rare metal assets through his son, Kemel Tokayev. Various independent Kazakh news sites became difficult to access; on 25 September, Kazakhtelecom blamed this on DDoS attacks alleged to have been incited from abroad. On the morning of 28 September, users from several of complained of massive internet malfunctions, including reports of airline flight delays, while Kazakh telecommunication operators insisted that their networks were "operating normally" and the problems were "global". NetBlocks reported that internet connectivity in Kazakhstan had fallen 23% below normal levels and that the incident, according to NetBlocks executive director Alp Toker, was "different from an internet outage". The State Technical Service of the National Security Committee described the issues as being cyberattacks by hackers targeting state bodies and internet infrastructure.

Several Kazakh journalists tied the internet disruptions and DDoS attacks on elections as a means of pressure and attempt to convey information by the Kazakh government. In a visit to the Abai Region on 30 September, Tolayev linked the cyberattacks to the upcoming polls, which he blamed on "external forces" attempting to "arrange a revolution within the country". The Akorda press service were accused of blurring out the segment of Tokayev's "external forces" remarks in its website.

Reports of DDoS attacks on several independent Kazakh media outlets continued throughout October 2022, including KazTAG and Orda.kz.

=== Political crackdowns and pressure ===
Since the announcement of the presidential elections, a number of public and political figures who opposed the holding of them faced a series of subsequent pressures, admin panels, criminal cases, as well as death threats.

Duman Muhametkärim, journalist and author of the YouTube channel ND, was issued a 15-day arrest on 12 October 2022 by the Specialised Interdistrict Administrative Court of Almaty Region after voicing his opposition to the snap presidential elections and calling on citizens to attend a protest in Almaty set for 25 October, in which he faced charges for violating "peaceful gathering".

Political scientist Dimaş Äljanov on 21 October 2022 reported on his Twitter page of being contacted by law enforcement after being accused of arson, which was viewed to have been as a form of message incited by the Kazakh government for elections with Äljanov noting Tokayev's previous quote of how "some people use language issues as a tool to break up society" in which he described it as warning message and accused Tokayev in attempting of seeking "enemies from the public" as a way to intimidate government critics and in result scare citizens and keep his challengers in panic.

Several Kazakh media editorial offices were also subjected to pressures and violence with the Elmedia facing attacks of vandalism and online threats, while Orda.kz reported receiving a severed pig head, to which the incident was brought up by Information and Social Development Minister Darhan Qydyräli, who expressed condemnation and offered to provide legal support for Orda.kz.

=== Hunger strike of Ermek Narymbai ===
In early October 2022, political activist Ermek Narymbai who has served in Kazakh prison since February of that year announced a hunger strike in protest of the CEC to allow fair elections, as well as an online publication of election protocol data gathered from polling stations. By 11 November, Narymbai's lawyer Janar Balgabaeva reported his worsening health condition due to decreased blood pressure and weight which resulted in Narymbai requiring hospitalisation at the prison medical center with Balgabaeva pleading for the CEC to oblige Narymbai's demands. In response, CEC member Şavkat Ötemisov expressed his awareness of the hunger strike by Narymbai and asserted that all elections are held "within the framework of the law" and from there, he announced that the CEC would switch to an electronic system of election protocols that would allow for Narymbai's proposal to be fulfilled, although ruling out the timing of it being done in a short time span.

=== Lawsuits and legal challenges ===
On 14 October 2022, civil activist and lawyer Älnur Iliaşev filed a complaint to the Supreme Court of Kazakhstan against President Tokayev and the Central Election Commission (CEC), both accusing the parties of violating citizens' voting rights by allowing for snap elections and registering Tokayev as a candidate for the race. He also assessed that failed opposition candidates Nūrjan Ältaev and Jasaral Quanyşälin were deprived of their right to vote as they were not provided with equal rights and conditions under the law for their candidacies. The Supreme Court held its hearing of the case on 17 October, where Iliaşev argued that a snap presidential election could only be held in case of the resident's death, sickness, or impeachment. Nevertheless, the following day on 18 October, the Supreme Court ruled against Iliaşev's case to which Iliaşev himself in response threatened to appeal the following court's decision.

On the appeals board of the Supreme Court on 31 October 2022 announced to review of another lawsuit that was initially rejected by the court on 25 October, both filed by civil activists Anton Fabryi and Omar Jumagulov against the CEC's rejection of their candidacies, which the plaintiffs argued the illegality by the CEC and that they should be registered on the ballot without being required to collect signatures, criticising the current legislative requirements for presidential candidates as being "restrictive" and not taking into account for self-nominees. Fabryi and Jumagulov had also noted that their refusals by the CEC violated the constitutional clause that grants the rights of Kazakh citizens "to elect and be elected". Despite the appeals board upholding the Supreme Court's previous decision, the activists announced that they would instead appeal to international organisations.

=== Media censorship ===
On 3 November 2022, the Eurasianet published an article titled Kazakhstan: Tokayev’s election campaign strives for legitimacy bump, which criticised Tokayev in attempting to form a public illusion of his popularity with the use of state media and bloggers, de facto conducting his campaign before being legally registered as a candidate and being compared in terms of his political behavior to predecessor Nursultan Nazarbayev. Following the publication, the Eurasianet removed the article from its website, citing pressures by the Kazakh authorities and that a representative from the Ministry of Foreign Affairs had warned that journalists from foreign news organisations could not perform their duties without accreditation, an explanatory claim that was contradicted by Eurasianet. Nevertheless, the news article was eventually restored on the website on 10 November.

=== Alleged voter intimidation in universities ===
In early November 2022, a video from the L. N. Gumilyov Eurasian National University showed a faculty member pressuring students to show up at the polls in "a decent way", footage of which was shared on social media. In response, the university management pledged to warn its employees, including the faculty member captured on video, about the violation of students' rights and that the issue would be kept under "personal control". According to civil activist Älnur Iliaşev, the practice of voter coercion of college students in Kazakhstan leads to pressures such as being deprived of a place in a dormitory and could mentally affect their subsequent academic performance. Several students reported to correspondents from Radio Free Europe/Radio Liberty, however, claiming that they had not heard of the news regarding the controversial video at all, although they acknowledged the fact of being asked about their voting intentions albeit without any intimidation.

== Conduct ==
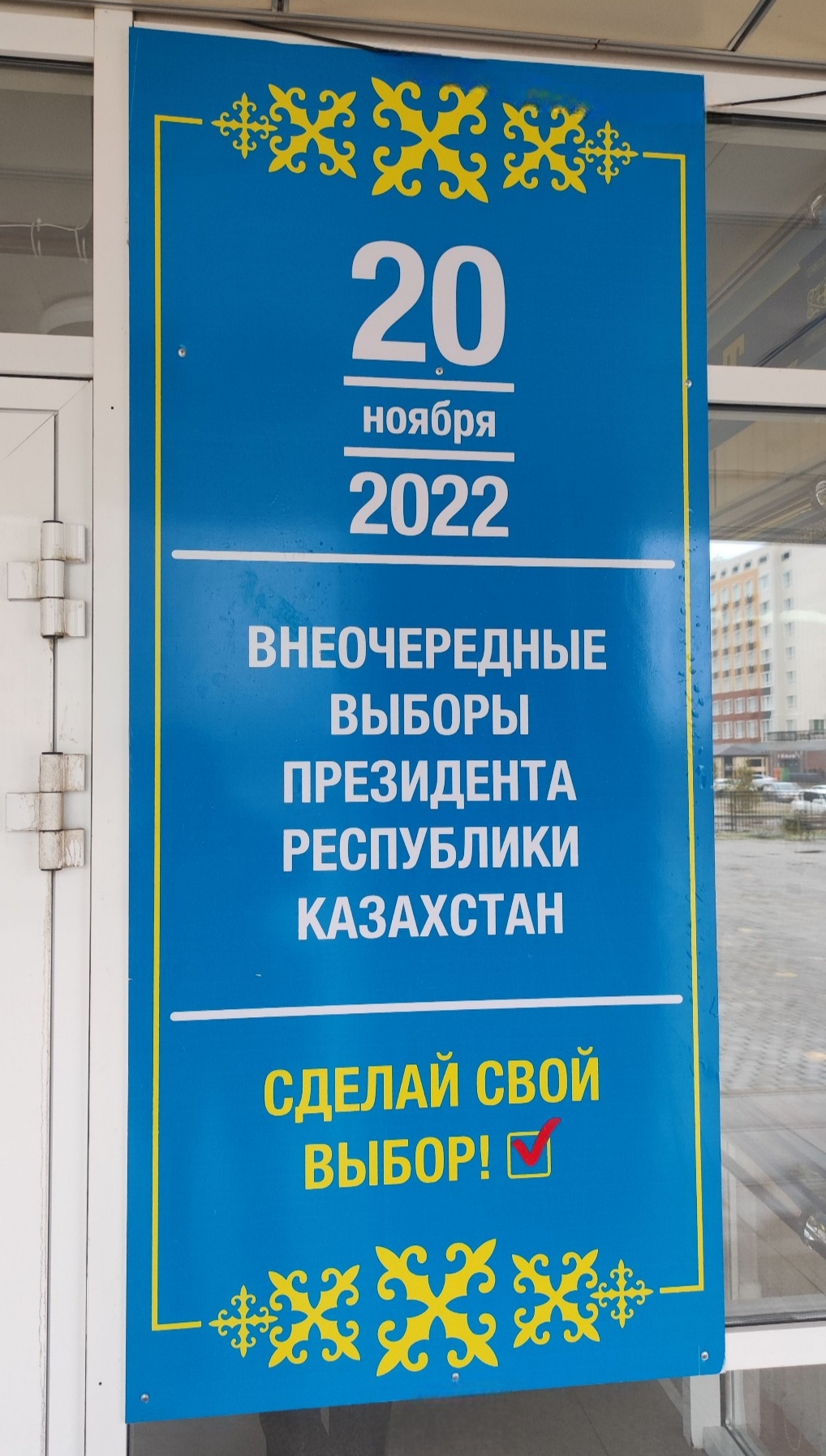
2022 election advertisement poster in Russian, Astana

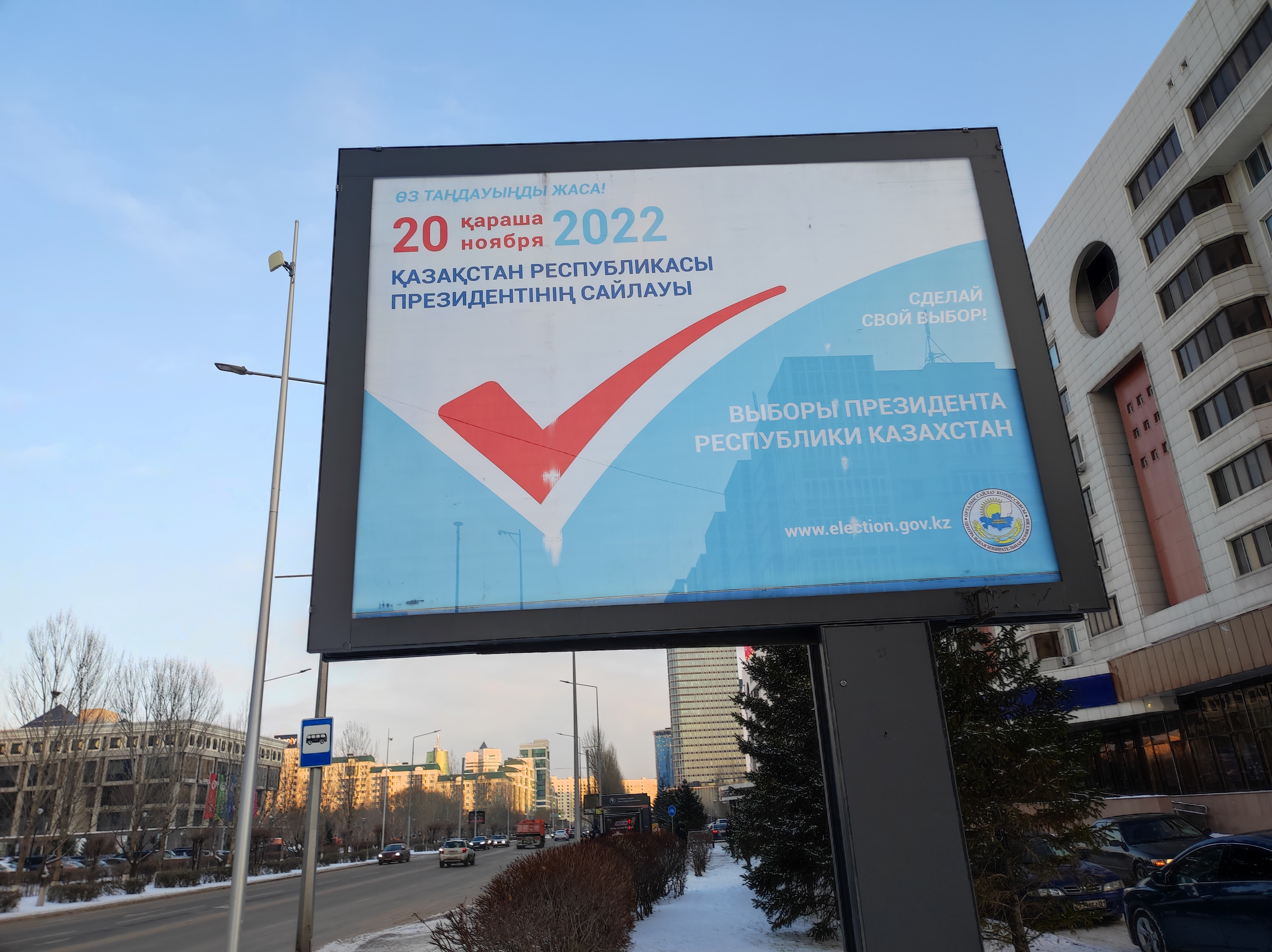
Billboard advertising the elections, Astana

Elections in Kazakhstan are prepared and conducted by various bodies of election commissions.

The Central Election Commission (CEC) during a meeting on 22 September 2022 addressed various issues regarding the approval of the timetable for the election; organisation of activities by the observers of foreign states, international organisations, and foreign media representatives; as well as organisation of training for members of election commissions and other participants in the process for election preparation.

=== Public funding ===
Shortly after Tokayev's announcement, Deputy Prime Minister and Finance Minister Erulan Jamaubaev ruled out spending billions of tenge on snap elections. National Economy Minister Älibek Quantyrov insisted that the government had enough reserves funding for the election and that a budget request would be calculated from the Central Election Commission, which will be considered by the Ministry of Finance.

On 8 September 2022, the Finance Ministry declared that 20 billion tenges would be spent on the presidential race and that the funding originally intended for the 2024 elections would come from the government budget. Sabila Mustafina, a member of the CEC, revealed that the exact cost of the election would amount to 20.5 billion tenges and that with the formation of new regions and polling stations, the CEC requested a certain amount in purchase and replacement of the remaining ballot boxes. On 27 September, the government approved the allocation of reserve funds for the election.

=== Voter registration ===
By 1 July and 1 January every year, information on voters and the boundaries of polling stations are submitted by the äkimats (local executive bodies) in the electronic form to their territorial election commissions, which ensure the verification and submission of information to the higher election commissions. As of 1 July 2022, there were approximately 11,827,277 registered voters in Kazakhstan.

Voter registration in Kazakhstan is conducted by a local executive body from the moment of announcement or appointment of elections and is compiled within the voter list, which is based on the place of residence in the territory of the given electoral district. The voter list for each polling station is approved by the akim (local head), who issues an ordinance twenty days (30 October 2022) before the election.

To vote absentee, a voter must notify the äkimat no later than thirty days (20 October 2022) before the election by applying their current place of residence for inclusion in a voter list at a different polling station. CEC deputy chairman Konstantin Petrov had also advised citizens in case if no more than twenty days are left before the vote (after 30 October 2022), then they could receive an absentee ballot directly from the polling station and vote wherever it would be convenient at the election day. It was reported that a total of 22,578 absentee ballots were issued to voters during that period.

=== Preparations ===
On 22 September 2022, the CEC along with the territorial election commissions (TECs) approved the organisation of training its commission members as well as others participating in the electoral process. From there, a series of training and workshops were held that period for representatives of the republican and regional media (28–30 September), representatives of political parties (5–7 October), and representatives from the campaign headquarters of presidential candidates (22 October).

The CEC in a meeting held on 31 October 2022, announced whilst taking into account of registered voters (11,950,485 people) that the total number voting ballots (including an extra reserve amount in 1% of the total electorate) would be produced, amounting to overall 12,069,990 ballot papers being printed for the election.

On 22 October, the Ministry of Foreign Affairs published a list of the citizens of Kazakhstan residing abroad in the locations of diplomatic missions where 68 polling stations were formed in 53 foreign countries. The Foreign Affairs Ministry in a press announcement on 14 November 2022 ruled out any voting precincts operating in Ukraine due to the 2022 Russian invasion, redirecting Kazakh citizens instead to vote in Poland or Moldova and informing the embassies in advance at respective countries for them to avoid the potential shortage of ballot papers.

From 4 November 2022, Kazakh voters were given the opportunity to check themselves in an electoral roll within their forming polling stations, as well as receive an absentee ballot to vote at another location. CEC chairman Nurlan Äbdirov on 15 November announced that a total of 10,101 polling stations both domestically and internationally will operate on election day.

On 18 November, Äbdirov revealed that 86 polling stations, under the decision by TECs, would start their operations an hour earlier than usual at 06:00 that included military units, correctional institutions, shift workplaces, sanatoriums and inpatient treatment facilities.

Number of polling stations that were formed for the 2022 election by region
Region	No. of polling stations
Abai Region	475
Akmola Region	717
Aktobe Region	517
Almaty Region	606
Atyrau Region	261
West Kazakhstan Region	505
Jambyl Region	493
Jetisu Region	447
Karaganda Region	642
Kostanay Region	745
Kyzylorda Region	373
Mangystau Region	243
Pavlodar Region	528
North Kazakhstan Region	640
Turkistan Region	919
Ulytau Region	136
East Kazakhstan Region	537
Astana	338
Almaty	600
Shymkent	311
Overseas	68
Total	10,101

=== Election day ===
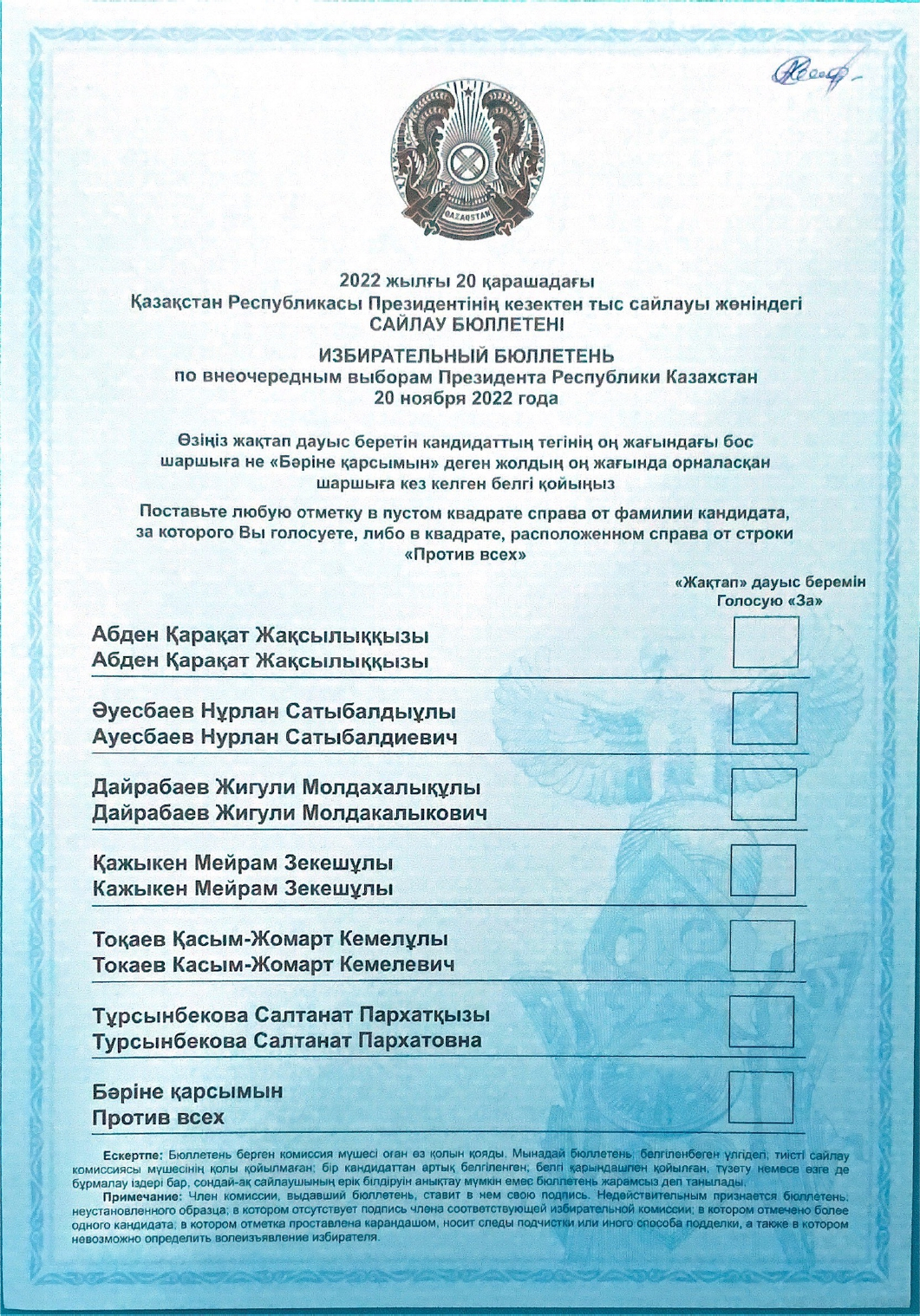
2022 election paper ballot

Polls in Kazakhstan officially opened on 20 November 2022 at 07:00 (with the exception of the ones an hour earlier) in the eastern portion of the country, as Kazakh citizens in Tokyo were the first ones to cast votes at 04:00 due to time zone differences.

As of 07:00, there were 8,150 polling stations operating in the republican cities of Almaty, Astana, and Shymkent, as well as other regions, with an additional 12 precincts overseas. By 08:00 the remaining polling stations opened in the western portion of Kazakhstan (Aktobe Region, Atyrau Region, West Kazakhstan Region, Kyzylorda Region and Mangystau Region), thus making all 10,033 of them operating in Kazakhstan and 17 overseas, while the rest of 51 foreign precincts would start voting depending on their local time zone. At 19:00 Deputy Foreign Affairs Minister Roman Vasilenko informed that 10 overseas precinct election commissions in the countries of South Korea, China, Singapore, Malaysia, Mongolia, Hong Kong, Shanghai, Thailand, and Indonesia had completed their work with the remaining 57 foreign precincts continuing work.

All polls closed at 20:00 local time, with the CEC reporting that a total of 8,299,501 voters had taken part in the election. The electoral precinct stationed in San Francisco reported a 100% precinct turnout rate and was the last to close on 21 November at 10:00.

== Observation ==
At the beginning of July 2022, a series of drafted amendments to the Constitutional Law "On Elections" were made public, which sparked controversy as one of the proposals according to various commentators would expand the powers of the Central Election Commission (CEC) and restrict the accreditation and polling station access of non-governmental organisations (NGOs) that receive international funding which would in general lead to a loss of independent observation. The proposed amendments had also included restrictions on photo, audio and video recordings as they would be essentially required to comply with legislative acts which in theory could limit the use of them at the polling observation. In response, Justice Minister Alma Mūqanova on 2 September explained the reasoning for the amendments was due to a need for an "institution of observation" to which the procedures would be "simplified as much as possible". She also ruled that the poll observers, including independent ones, during the election would be allowed to conduct photo and video shooting at the polling stations.

On 22 September 2022, the CEC opened the Institute for International Observation to which it sent invitations to 28 international organisations and foreign countries. On 17 October 2022, the first 43 representatives were accredited.

As of the 14 November 2022 18:00 deadline, a total of 641 international observers were given accreditation by the CEC, which encompassed 532 observers from 10 international organisations and 109 observers from 35 foreign states.

=== OSCE ===
The Office for Democratic Institutions and Human Rights (ODIHR) under the Organization for Security and Co-operation in Europe (OSCE) on 19 October 2022 opened its election observation mission in Astana. The mission, headed by Urszula Gacek, consisted of 11 international experts and 30 long-term observers who would be deployed in Kazakhstan starting 26 October and an additional 300 short-term observers would arrive several days before polls open.

In its interim report issued on 4 November 2022, the OSCE described the presidential campaign as "low-key" with limited public interest and debate as all contestants' election programs were indistinguishable and sometimes even supportive of President Tokayev's. The OSCE when acknowledging a large number of media outlets voiced concerns over Kazakhstan not having legislation in disclosing media ownership which in turn leads to a "lack of transparency of media ownership and the allocation of state funds". While the interim report affirmed that television was used as a main source of political information, it also noted a significant rise in the popularity of online media and social networks including their criminal offence liability of insults over online posts, with some OSCE monitors expressing concerns of vilification towards "critical voices and incidents of threats and attacks against journalists".

== Debates ==
On 21 October 2022, the Central Election Commission (CEC) announced in holding of presidential debates that were set to be broadcast on Khabar Agency. Prior to the premiere on 9 November, it was revealed that the participation in debates would be open to Kazakh citizens under the Khabar Agency's special programme of "Ask a Candidate!", with voters being given the opportunity until 10 November to forward a candidate any question via one-minute video message to Khabar Agency.

The televised debates took place on 11 November 2022, where almost all candidates took part in it with exception of President Tokayev, as he paid a working visit to Samarkand in neighbouring Uzbekistan that same day with him instead being represented by Erlan Qoşanov at the podium. The debate consisted of four rounds with the first stage of the debate every candidate along with their present surrogates presented their election programs and was followed by the second stage where candidates were given 30 seconds to ask questions to two of their chosen opponents who were given two minutes to respond to their respective questioners. In the third stage of the presidential debate, the participants answered receiving voters' video recordings of questions which then proceeded to the fourth and final stage where candidates made their own address directly to the electorate.

2022 Kazakh presidential election debates
Date and time	Organisers	Location	Language	Moderator(s)	P Participant R Representative						Duration	Notes
Date and time	Organisers	Location	Language	Moderator(s)	Tokayev	Äbden	Dairabaev	Äuesbaev	Tursynbekova	Qajyken	Duration	Notes
11 November 2022; 20:00	Khabar Agency	Astana	Kazakh, Russian	Maqsat Tolyqbai; Laura Jakupova	R (Note: Represented by Erlan Qoşanov)	P	P	P	P	P	1:40:49	

== Opinion polls ==
Opinion polling in Kazakhstan may only be conducted by legal firms that are registered in accordance with the law of having at least five years of experience in conducting public surveys and had notified the Central Election Commission (CEC) of the polling firm's specialists and their experience along with the locations where they are conducted, and the analysis methods used. It is prohibited for pollsters to publish opinion survey results on the internet regarding the election of candidates and political parties five days before voting begins (after 14 November 2022) as well as on election day at premises or in polling stations.

By 10 November 2022, the CEC received notifications from seven entities to legally conduct election polling via face-to-face, phone calls, and online which were: Public Opinion Research Institute, Amanat Party Institute for Public Policy, Youth Research Centre, Institute of Democracy Scientific Research Association, Institute of Comprehensive Social Research, DAMU RG Research Group, Open Society International Institute for Regional Studies. The Prosecutor General's Office of Kazakhstan, ahead of the vote on 14 November, issued a warning to individuals, pollsters, and the media to abide by the law regulating election polling or otherwise they would face liability, to which the Prosecutor General's Office reported that it had issued two administrative fines towards surveyors.

Polling source	Date(s) conducted	Sample size	Tokayev	Dairabaev	Äuesbaev	Tursynbekova	Qajyken	Äbden	Against all	Undecided
Democratic Institute and Damu Research Group	29 October – 10 November 2022	–	81.6%	2%	0.4%	0.7%	0.5%	1.7%	4.7%	8.4%
Public Opinion Research Institute	4–6 November 2022	1,200	78.8%	2.8%	1.8%	1.6%	1.6%	0.8%	3.2%	9.4%

Support for holding snap presidential elections

Polling source	Date(s) conducted	Sample size	Yes	No	Undecided	Lead
Qalaisyn	15–19 September 2022	1,200	77.7%	8.8%	13.6%	68.9

Interest in voting for the election

Polling source	Date(s) conducted	Sample size	Yes	No	Maybe	Undecided	Difficult to answer	Lead
Democratic Institute and Damu Research Group	29 October – 10 November 2022	–	77.5%	9.7	–	12.8%	–	64.7
Public Opinion Research Institute	4–6 November 2022	1,200	71.6%	6.1%	6.1%	4%	18.3%	53.3
Public Opinion Research Institute	6–10 October 2022	1,200	73.1%	9.7%	–	15.9%	1.3%	68

Trust in fairness of the election

Polling source	Date(s) conducted	Sample size	Yes	No	Difficult to answer	Lead
Public Opinion Research Institute	4–6 November 2022	1,200	84.4%	11%	4.6%	65.5
Public Opinion Research Institute	6–10 October 2022	1,200	76.1%	–	–	–

=== Exit polls ===
According to CEC chairman Nurlan Äbdirov on 14 November 2022, three polling organisations of Amanat Party Institute for Public Policy, Institute of Comprehensive Social Research Astana "SOTSIS-A", and the "Open Society" International Institute for Regional Studies announced their intent in conducting exit polls outside premises and voting precincts on election day.

An average of 10,000 to 20,000 people across Kazakhstan were interviewed on voting day in four timespan measurements and results divided into major categories were then sent into the database for counting and analysation.

Exit polls published at midnight of 21 November 2022 showed overwhelming support for Tokayev along with the ballot column "Against all" being the second most marked option, as it led to several news agencies in the early hours of 21 November projecting Tokayev's electoral win.

Polling source	Tokayev	Dairabaev	Äuesbaev	Tursynbekova	Qajyken	Äbden	Against all
Amanat Party Institute for Public Policy	85.5%	2.7%	1.9%	1.4%	2.4%	2.6%	3.4%
Institute of Comprehensive Social Research Astana "SOTSIS-A"	82%	3.7%	2.4%	2.2%	2.6%	2.8%	4.2%
"Open Society" International Institute for Regional Studies	82.5%	3.3%	2.2%	2.1%	2.2%	2.5%	5.2%

== Results ==
In a follow-up to the announcement of the exit polls, the Central Election Commission (CEC) announced that it would present preliminary results of the election in a subsequent briefing on 21 November 2022 at 11:00. From there, the preliminary results showed Tokayev winning an overwhelming 81.3% majority of the vote, a higher margin in comparison to 2019, followed by Dairabaev who had garnered only 3.4%, thus making him the second-place frontrunner in the race and the first candidate to receive less than 5% of the vote since Turgyn Syzdyqov in 2015. The overall voter turnout had reached 69.4%, the lowest number of any in the presidential elections of Kazakhstan. For the first time since 1999, the ballot column "Against all" was reincluded in the election, to which 5.8% of Kazakh voters had cast their votes, making it the second overall most picked ballot column.

The following day the CEC confirmed the final results of the election by approving the voting protocols and certifying Tokayev's reelection win, who essentially became the president-elect.

Candidate	Party	Votes	%
Kassym-Jomart Tokayev	People's Coalition (Ind.)	6,456,392	81.31
Jiguli Dairabaev	Auyl People's Democratic Patriotic Party (Ind.)	271,641	3.42
Qaraqat Äbden	National Alliance of Professional Social Workers (Amanat)	206,206	2.60
Meiram Qajyken	"Amanat" Commonwealth of Trade Unions (Ind.)	200,907	2.53
Nurlan Äuesbaev	Nationwide Social Democratic Party	176,116	2.22
Saltanat Tursynbekova	Qazaq analary – dästürge jol (Amanat)	168,731	2.12
Against all		460,484	5.80
Total		7,940,477	100.00
Valid votes		7,940,477	95.67
Invalid/blank votes		359,569	4.33
Total votes		8,300,046	100.00
Registered voters/turnout		11,953,465	69.44
Source: CEC

=== Results by region ===
Results by region
Region	Tokayev		Dairabaev		Äbden		Qajyken		Äuesbaev		Tursynbekova		Against all	
Region	Votes	%	Votes	%	Votes	%	Votes	%	Votes	%	Votes	%	Votes	%
Abai Region	259,339	86.62%	9,173	3.06%	7,746	2.59%	6,039	2.02%	5,871	1.96%	4,103	1.37%	7,129	2.38%
Aqmola Region	318,652	79.75%	11,624	2.91%	6,194	1.55%	8,899	2.23%	10,820	2.71%	10,800	2.70%	32,575	8.15%
Aqtöbe Region	331,041	84.32%	18,908	4.82%	8,536	2.17%	4,125	1.05%	9,517	2.42%	9,312	2.37%	11,145	2.84%
Almaty Region	514,145	79.13%	25,987	4.00%	17,713	2.73%	27,535	4.24%	23,019	3.54%	13,980	2.15%	27,336	4.21%
Atyrau Region	211,720	78.23%	7,165	2.65%	8,624	3.19%	5,676	2.10%	5,312	1.96%	6,955	2.57%	25,194	9.31%
West Kazakhstan Region	239,148	82.07%	11,087	3.80%	8,611	2.95%	13,251	4.55%	3,726	1.28%	6,575	2.26%	9,009	3.09%
Jambyl Region	488,693	86.07%	12,353	2.18%	12,979	2.29%	16,524	2.91%	9,856	1.74%	10,781	1.90%	16,573	2.92%
Jetisu Region	298,311	84.15%	12,232	3.45%	8,961	2.53%	7,257	2.05%	10,666	3.01%	7,570	2.14%	9,487	2.68%
Qarağandy Region	476,971	80.04%	14,949	2.15%	18,747	3.15%	15,552	2.61%	12,082	2.03%	11,141	1.87%	46,472	7.80%
Qostanai Region	345,316	82.21%	12,961	3.09%	5,409	1.29%	6,156	1.47%	9,366	2.23%	9,192	2.19%	31,616	7.53%
Qyzylorda Region	289,699	76.89%	19,953	5.30%	10,651	2.83%	7,245	1.92%	7,871	2.09%	8,915	2.37%	32,424	8.61%
Mangystau Region	189,753	76.15%	14,231	5.71%	7,306	2.93%	2,679	1.08%	3,672	1.47%	5,803	2.33%	25,739	10.33%
Pavlodar Region	291,807	78.51%	10,722	2.88%	7,017	1.89%	14,136	3.80%	7,982	2.15%	9,911	2.67%	30,128	8.11%
North Kazakhstan Region	231,223	80.52%	6,727	2.34%	3,380	1.18%	8,961	3.12%	5,086	1.77%	5,409	1.88%	26,384	9.19%
Türkistan Region	800,353	86.63%	28,314	3.06%	32,129	3.48%	17,964	1.94%	13,152	1.42%	8,313	0.90%	23,655	2.56%
Ulytau Region	87,899	84.78%	2,985	2.88%	2,571	2.48%	1,445	1.39%	1,572	1.52%	1,902	1.83%	5,300	5.11%
East Kazakhstan Region	290,329	77.71%	12,810	3.43%	9,913	2.65%	11,019	2.95%	9,676	2.59%	10,849	2.90%	29,027	7.77%
Astana	288,093	80.31%	13,516	3.77%	9,017	2.51%	10,850	3.02%	7,109	1.98%	10,404	2.90%	19,716	5.50%
Almaty	196,178	67.31%	13,959	4.79%	10,375	3.56%	6,243	2.14%	11,902	4.08%	10,945	3.76%	41,874	14.37%
Shymkent	307,722	84.81%	11,985	3.30%	10,327	2.85%	9,351	2.58%	7,859	2.17%	5,871	1.62%	9,701	2.67%
Kazakhstan	6,456,392	81.31%	271,641	3.42%	206,206	2.60%	200,907	2.53%	176,116	2.22%	168,731	2.12%	460,484	5.80%

=== Voter turnout ===
Turnout was low in the two largest cities, with less than 30% of voters from Almaty participating, and less than half of voters from Astana participating. Turnout was higher elsewhere, ranging from almost 60% in Shymkent to over 81% in the newly formed Jetisu Region.

Region	Time						
Region	10:00	12:00	14:00	16:00	18:00	20:00	22:00
Abai Region	25.64%	43.67%	69.32%	73.57%	78.88%	80.18%	80.18%
Akmola Region	21.21%	40.13%	51.04%	71.38%	75.82%	78.87%	78.87%
Aktobe Region	26.66%	44.48%	53.21%	68.81%	71.23%	72.20%	72.81%
Almaty Region	20.12%	25.83%	40.85%	55.11%	70.92%	72.10%	72.10%
Atyrau Region	25.03%	40.42%	52.56%	60.87%	67.88%	70.87%	70.87%
West Kazakhstan Region	20.86%	27.55%	43.85%	54.62%	64.77%	67.77%	68.67%
Jambyl Region	23.27%	41.29%	52.74%	68.74%	77.27%	79.57%	79.57%
Jetisu Region	25.58%	42.18%	52.17%	68.88%	77.08%	81.43%	81.42%
Karaganda Region	32.27%	44.99%	53.75%	71.89%	77.80%	78.39%	78.39%
Kostanay Region	26.97%	42.87%	53.15%	71.38%	77.56%	79.28%	79.28%
Kyzylorda Region	29.41%	43.46%	59.18%	72.88%	77.20%	80.31%	81.07%
Mangystau Region	25.20%	41.19%	53.40%	59.61%	64.57%	66.18%	66.99%
Pavlodar Region	27.90%	44.23%	52.55%	72.73%	77.12%	77.58%	77.58%
North Kazakhstan Region	27.33%	43.64%	53.10%	72.21%	77.46%	78.24%	79.01%
Turkistan Region	27.03%	64.21%	76.61%	80.09%	80.25%	80.37%	80.37%
Ulytau Region	27.81%	52.22%	68.32%	72.75%	74.45%	75.48%	75.48%
East Kazakhstan Region	23.17%	41.86%	52.99%	68.42%	76.81%	79.49%	79.49%
Astana	13.73%	19.33%	39.79%	44.39%	48.01%	48.67%	48.60%
Almaty	8.42%	16.89%	24.17%	26.19%	27.93%	28.72%	28.72%
Shymkent	30.92%	34.41%	51.69%	56.28%	59.56%	59.79%	59.79%
Kazakhstan	23.37%	38.55%	51.16%	62.34%	67.85%	69.31%	69.43%

== Aftermath ==
On the morning of 26 November 2022, the third presidential inauguration of Tokayev was held in Astana at the Palace of Independence. Attended by members of the government, parliament, Constitutional Council, judges of the Supreme Court, representatives of the diplomatic corps accredited in Kazakhstan as well as other invited guests which included presidential candidates and former president Nursultan Nazarbayev. Tokayev at the inauguration ceremony swore an oath of allegiance and was handed over his presidential certificate. From there, he assessed that public trust was his loyal hostage adding that he would aim to transform Kazakhstan into a prosperous state and that promises made in his election programme will be fulfilled within the next seven years of his presidential term.

Shortly after Tokayev assumed office, a protest against his inauguration took place on the evening of 26 November in Astana. According to local media and Telegram channels, the protest crowd led by Marat Äbiev gathered in the afternoon at the Mega shopping center and from there, about 300 demonstrators marched towards the Aqorda Presidential Palace which lasted for about an hour before being dispersed alongside Äbiev and dozens of his supporters being detained by the police. During that time, reports of internet outages occurred in Astana, to which the State Technical Service blamed the incident on accidental electrical grid failures that occurred at telecommunications equipment. The Ministry of Internal Affairs in response described the unsanctioned protests as an "illegal procession" in which Äbiev's supporters attempted to achieve their "personal illegal goals" and that Äbiev was subsequently placed into administrative detention for 15 days.

=== Reactions ===
Upon the announcement of preliminary results, presidential candidates Jiguli Dairabaev, Qaraqat Äbden, Meiram Qajyken, Nurlan Äuesbaev, and Saltanat Tursynbekova conceded their loses and all congratulated Tokayev for his reelection win. Former president Nursultan Nazarbayev expressing his congratulatory remarks praised Tokayev for his work in "the hours of criticism" in the "fate of independence".

Tokayev's victory in the 2022 election was met with both optimism and doubts by political leaders and commentators. Some analysts believed that his extended term in office would lead to further distancing in Kazakhstan's relations with Russia over the invasion of Ukraine, while Russian Senator Andrey Shevchenko insisted that the reelection of Tokayev would allow for continued cooperation between Moscow and Astana. Russian journalist Dmitry Babich citing Tokayev's words assessed that Tokayev would continue to pursue a "multi-vector approach" by maintaining balanced foreign relations with all four major powers of the United States, European Union, China, and Russia.

==== International ====
- Armenia – Armenian president Vahagn Khachaturyan in a message expressed his congratulations for Tokayev's victory, wishing him "sound health, efficacious work and success" in his responsible state position.
- Azerbaijan – Ilham Aliyev, President of Azerbaijan, congratulated Tokayev on his win where in the written message he embarked that the election results are a "clear manifestation" of "people's great trust and confidence".
- Belarus – President Alexander Lukashenko in a phone call had congratulated Tokayev for his election victory, to which he emphasised that the reelection had become a "clear confirmation of the national support for a strategic course for effective reforms aimed at modernising the country and strengthening its international authority".
- China – Xi Jinping, President of China, in a telegram congratulated Tokayev for his win, adding that the results fully demonstrated "the trust and support of the Kazakh people" for Tokayev.
- France – French President Emmanuel Macron congratulated Tokayev in a written letter where Macron conveyed that Tokayev would maintain this momentum and help carry out the reforms in the "interests of the country and Kazakhstanis".
- India – Prime Minister Narendra Modi on his Twitter page expressed his congratulatory remarks for Tokayev winning snap polls, saying that he would look forward to continuing working with Tokayev to further strengthen the partnership between the two countries.
- Iran – Ebrahim Raisi, President of Iran, congratulated Tokayev for his electoral win, expressing hope for improvement in relations between Kazakhstan and Iran in his renewed presidential term.
- Kyrgyzstan – President Sadyr Japarov, congratulating Tokayev on his landslide victory, noted that his reelection win was an "important indicator of the support and trust of the Kazakh people" and that the election results confirmed support for his political direction.
- Russia – Russian President Vladimir Putin in a congratulatory message published by the Kremlin, stated that Tokayev had received a "convincing mandate" from "fellow citizens" that would open up new opportunities for Tokayev's "implementation of the course of national development".
- Singapore – Halimah Yacob, President of Singapore, described the results of the election in a written congratulatory letter as being a "strong endorsement" of Tokayev's leadership that reflected the trust and confidence of the Kazakh people.
- Tajikistan – In a telegram message, President Emomali Rahmon expressed his sincere and best wishes for Tokayev's electoral win which he described as "clear evidence" of "high political influence and the support of the people" towards his policy.
- Turkey – President Recep Tayyip Erdoğan in a telephone conversation congratulated Tokayev for his second term win, adding hope that the election results would benefit "friendly and brotherly Kazakhstan".
- Turkmenistan – President Serdar Berdimuhamedow upon congratulating Tokayev in a message, stressed Kazakhstan will achieve an "even greater success" as well as increase its authority in the "international arena".
- Ukraine – Volodymyr Zelenskyy, President of Ukraine, congratulated Tokayev on winning the snap election on his Twitter page where he expressed willingness to further development of Kazakhstan–Ukraine relations and thanked Tokayev for providing humanitarian assistance.
- United Kingdom – Neil Bush, head of the UK's Delegation to the Organization for Security and Co-operation in Europe (OSCE) in Vienna outlined his speech, "We believe that the observations and recommendations from ODIHR’s preliminary and final reports will further support Kazakhstan as its government and people undertake this next important stage of reform, 30 years after achieving sovereignty and independence."
- United States – Spokesperson for the US Department of State Ned Price in a press statement wrote: "Following the November 20 presidential elections, we look forward to working with President Tokayev and his government to advance our common objectives. The United States also reiterates its unwavering support for Kazakhstan’s sovereignty, independence, and territorial integrity, which has been the bedrock of our partnership for over 30 years." Price had also called for full implementation of political reforms by Tokayev for the "benefit of all the people of Kazakhstan".
- Uzbekistan – President Shavkat Mirziyoyev in a telephone conversation congratulated Tokayev on the successful holding of the presidential elections and for his win.

== See also ==
- 2023 Kazakh legislative election
