= Qaraqat Äbden 2022 presidential campaign =

2022 Presidential Campaign in Kazakhstan

Qaraqat Äbden for President 2022
- Campaign: 2022 Kazakh presidential election
- Candidate: Qaraqat Äbden; Member of the Nur-Sultan City Mäslihat (2016–2021)
- Affiliation: KÄQŪA
- Status: Announced; 7 October 2022; Official nominee 7 October 2022; Lost election 21 November 2022
- Headquarters: Astana
- Key people: Berik Törebekov (deputy chief of staff)

Website
- abden.kz

On 7 October 2022, Qaraqat Äbden's campaign was formed after she received a presidential nomination by the National Alliance of Professional Social Workers (KÄQŪA). The following day on 8 October, Äbden submitted her documents to the Central Election Commission (CEC) to officially run for election. She then participated through a series of qualifications beginning with the Kazakh language exam on 10 October conducted by the linguistic commission which declared her as fluent. After having her compliancy established by the CEC on 11 October, Äbden collected a total of 121,314 signatures by 19 October for campaign support and in result, she received a registration certificate by the CEC, this allowing her to appear on the ballot.

== Background ==
=== Nomination ===
The National Alliance of Professional Social Workers (KÄQŪA) public association held its general meeting on 7 October 2022 in Astana, from where Qaraqat Äbden, member of the National Commission for Women Affairs and Family and Demographic Policy under the President and chairwoman of the Qazaq Qyzy public association, was nominated as a first female candidate for the 2022 presidential election in order to "achieve and promote the goals and objectives" of the KÄQŪA as well as raising a national issue and protecting interests of socially vulnerable Kazakh citizens.

=== Registration ===
On 8 October 2022, Äbden submitted a list of necessary documents to the Central Election Commission (CEC) and underwent a state language exam for her knowledge in Kazakh on 10 October to which the linguistic commission unanimously found her fluent in. The CEC on the following day of 11 October announced that Äbden meet all requirements to participate in the race, thus setting stage for signature collection to which a total of 121,314 from all 15 regions of Kazakhstan were submitted to the CEC on 19 October, with 118,418 of them being deemed as valid.

== Campaign ==
At 18:00 UTC+06:00 on 21 October 2022, Äbden's republican campaign headquarters began operating with the first meeting of the organising committee being held. According to Berik Törebekov, the campaign would be held in all regions of Kazakhstan via in-person and remotely.

=== Structure ===
The republican campaign headquarters for Äbden operated its branches in 20 regions of Kazakhstan with its main office in Astana consisting of 10 workers.

== Election program ==
In her campaign website, Äbden's election programme included a series of measures in terms of national values, improving standard of living, and the formation of "The main wealth of the state is a person” (Kazakh: Мемлекеттің басты байлығы — адам) position that she would implement if elected as president:

Family policies

- Develop and introduce a school curriculum on the spiritual development of the younger generation in the best traditions of national family education;
- Introduce a system of cash certificates for housing or rent payments of apartments for a certain period;
- Lawfully require employers to include bonus support for young families in corporate workplaces;
- Lower requirements in rewarding mothers with many children;
- Recognising housewife raising children as an "employee" during her length of service;
- Automate process of child enrollment to nearby kindergarten and schools;
- Radical digitalisation for social assistance benefits application;
- Compensation for mothers with many children in areas with lack of communication and infrastructure.

Child support measures

- Develop separate program in subsidising children free additional education and expanding free organisations of communication between schoolchildren and college students;
- Improving construction of educational facilities to correlate with growing population;
- Creating a system in supporting children of abilities and talents through clubs and sections along with state program prepping mentors;
- Unified system of assistance to children with rare diseases;
- Obliging kindergartens and schools seeing every child and taking care of them.

Assistance to young adults

- Providing free education to all students and attendees;
- Scholarship payments tied with salary system;
- Increasing cooperation between the educational institutions and the workplace enterprises as well as ensuring skilled trade education;
- Creation of a national-patriotic youth clubs with the involvement of representatives by the older generation;
- Opening supporting centres for harmonious development of girls.

Assistance to elderly

- Development of a program to allow senior retirees to travel around Kazakhstan at discounted rates;
- Grant program for the organising joint leisure "Meeting of Generations" events;
- Friendly designed infrastructure for walking and recreation of elderly people;
- Developing complex system of treatment and rehabilitation of elderly people.
