= Saltanat Tursynbekova 2022 presidential campaign =

Kazakh presidential candidacy

Saltanat Tursynbekova for President 2022
- Campaigned for: 2022 Kazakh presidential election
- Candidate: Saltanat Tursynbekova
- Affiliation: QA–DJ
- Status: Announced; 11 October 2022; Official nominee 11 October 2022; Lost election 21 November 2022
- Headquarters: Astana
- Website: st22.kz

Attorney and civil rights activist Saltanat Tursynbekova received her campaign endorsement by the Qazaq analary–dästürge jol (QA–DJ) public association on 11 October 2022 and that same day, she submitted her nomination to the Central Election Commission (CEC). Her knowledge of the state language exam for Kazakh was ruled as fluent by the linguistic commission on 12 October and was subsequently declared to be qualified to run for presidency by the CEC. From there, Tursynbekova carried out collection of signatures to which a total of 119,316 of them were submitted to the CEC, resulting her official registration as candidate on 20 October in the election.

== Background ==
=== Nomination ===
On 11 October 2022, a meeting of the Qazaq analary–dästürge jol (QA–DJ) took place which was held both in-person and remotely, from which Saltanat Tursynbekova, attorney and civil rights activist, was nominated as a second female candidate after Qaraqat Äbden for the 2022 presidential elections by all 38 members of the QA–DJ. In a following interview with Vlast, Tursynbekova reported that her election platform was still being in the process of finalisation and that it would be address a "huge range of issues", not ruling out the issue of national security as well as it would be considered along her social agenda, asserting that the concept had been outlined by President Kassym-Jomart Tokayev.

=== Registration ===
After being nominated the same day, Tursynbekova put forward her candidacy by submitting documents to the Central Election Commission (CEC) and underwent the required linguistic exam for Kazakh on 12 October 2022 to which the linguistic commission, overseeing the exam, announced her as fluent in a unanimous decision. On the same day, CEC deemed Tursynbekova meeting requirements to be a candidate which proceeded her to begin the process of collecting signatures. On 20 October, a total of 119,316 signatures from 18 regions of Kazakhstan were collected on her behalf with 118,434 of them being certified by the CEC which alongside issued registration of Tursynbekova.

== Campaign ==
Tursynbekova's republican election headquarters was formed on 21 October 2022, with the official opening in Astana being held in-person and remotely where issues of campaigning, plans for the future, as well as the Tursynbekova's election programme was discussed.

=== Structure ===
The campaign headquarters of Tursynbekova employed 10 people and operated its branches in 20 regions of Kazakhstan with Tursynbekova stated that her staff "will plan and organise everything from morning to evening".
