= Alnur Ilyashev =

Human rights activist

Alnur Kairatuly Ilyashev (Kazakh: Әлнұр Қайратұлы Ілияшев; born 2 November 1977) is a Kazakhstani human rights activist. He was arrested in April, 2020, for writing Facebook posts critiquing the Nur Otan Party and its officials.

== Activism ==
Ilyashev advocated for the creation of an independent multi-party democratic system. He campaigned against Kazakhstan's laws restricting freedom of assembly, which require permission from the authorities to hold a street protest.

In 2019, the activist Sanavar Zakirova established a political party called "Our Right." Ilyashev supported her, but was called to the police station during the founding congress of the party. He, along with other activists, sued the Nur Otan Party for disrupting the creation of "Our Right."

Due to the COVID-19 pandemic, Kazakhstan entered into a state of emergency, and during this time Ilyashev posted on his private Facebook page three statements critiquing the government. Ilyashev was prosecuted for posting these three statements, and accused of writing them "in order to destabilize the situation in the Republic of Kazakhstan."

== Arrest and sentence ==
Ilyashev was arrested on April 17, 2020, and the police searched his home, workplace, car and the homes of four of his relatives. The following day, Ilyashev was notified that he was a suspect under article 274 of the Kazakh Criminal Code. Ilyashev's trial was held online, and due to poor connection, he was unable to hear or see a significant portion of the proceedings. According to the Clooney Foundation for Justice and the American Bar Association, severe due process violations occurred during his trial.

On June 22, 2020, the court found Ilyashev guilty of violating article 274, and he was sentenced to three years of restricted liberty and 100-hours per year of forced labour. He is also banned from any political activities for five years. His sentence was upheld in September 2020.

== International response ==
The U.S. State Department highlighted Ilyashev in its 2020 Country Reports on Human Rights Practices.

PEN America has identified Ilyashev as a Writer at Risk.

On February 12, 2021, the human rights organization Freedom Now and the trial firm McKool Smith filed a petition with the UN Working Group on Arbitrary Detention on behalf of Ilyashev. The American Bar Association published a report on the trial, concluding the "proceedings against Mr. Ilyashev violated his right to a fair trial and right to freedom of expression" and "Kazakhstan must remedy these abuses" to fulfill its obligations under the ICCPR. Amnesty International has stated Ilyashev is a prisoner of conscience and should be released immediately by the Kazakh authorities.
