= Agro-Industrial Complex =

Sector of activity producing and processing food

Agro-Industrial Complex is a term aimed to identify the combination of several sectors of the economy providing mass production of food and consumer goods. The term is more common in countries of command economy, particularly the former Soviet Union where the term appeared in the 1970s. Beside regular farming and agriculture it also encompasses industries such as forestry, fishing and others.

The agro-based industries includes four main fields of interest:

- Agriculture, the basis (nucleus) of the Agro-Industrial industries includes horticulture, animal husbandry, industrial farming and individual farming;
- Supporting industries and services providing support to agriculture by means of production and material resources such as manufacturing of farming equipment including agricultural machinery as well as tools, production of fertilizers and other chemicals including pesticides, etc;
- Industries processing agricultural basic goods such as food industry, or industries processing agricultural basic goods for light industry;
- Infrastructural section of the Agro-Industrial Complex includes productions that are involved in provision, transportation, safekeeping, trading of agricultural materials, training of human resources and construction.
