= National Alliance of Professional Social Workers =

Kazakh professional association

- National Alliance of Professional Social Workers Republican Public Association
- Кәсіби әлеуметтік қызметкерлердің ұлттық альянсы
- Abbreviation: NAPSW
- Established: 8 April 2019; 7 years ago
- Type: Professional association
- Legal status: Public association
- Purpose: Social work
- Headquarters: 10A Ahmet Jubanov St., Apt. 221
- Location: Astana, Kazakhstan
- Region served: Almaty, Astana, Semey, Kokshetau, Kyzylorda, Pavlodar
- Official languages: Kazakh; Russian; English
- Executive Director: Dinara Esimova
- Funding: membership fees, grants
- Website: Official website

The National Alliance of Professional Social Workers (NAPSW; Kazakh: Кәсіби әлеуметтік қызметкерлердің ұлттық альянсы, romanized: Käsıbi äleumettık qyzmetkerlerdıñ ūlttyq aliansy; Russian: Национальный альянс профессиональных социальных работников, romanized: Natsionalnyy alyans professionalnykh sotsialnykh rabotnikov) is a professional association in Kazakhstan that was founded on 8 April 2019. The NAPSW plays a significant role in advancing the development of social work as a profession, strengthening international cooperation, and offering expert and educational support to social workers at all levels. Its mission is to enhance the professional standards of social work, promote effective practices, and contribute to the overall development of the social services sector in Kazakhstan.

== History ==
The National Alliance of Professional Social Workers (NAPSW) was officially formed following a protocol meeting on 27 March 2019 by faculty members of the Department of Sociology at L. N. Gumilyov Eurasian National University in Kazakhstan, and was registered with the Ministry of Justice on 8 April 2019, which the association designates as its official founding date. The primary goal of KÄQŪA is to unite professional social workers and individuals performing social work functions across various sectors, including social protection, healthcare, education, justice, and law enforcement. The association seeks to establish and promote social work as a recognized and professional field in Kazakhstan. Through its efforts, KÄQŪA aims to strengthen the impact and effectiveness of social services within the country.

=== Objectives ===
According to its Charter, NAPSW focuses on the following areas:

- Training and professional development of social workers
- Development and promotion of the National Code of Ethics for Social Workers
- Certification of social workers
- Institutionalization of supervision in social work practice
- Accreditation of social service organizations providing integrated services
- Enhancement of social work education at all academic levels
- Promoting the recognition and professional status of social work in Kazakhstan

=== Key Initiatives and Projects ===
1. Support for Vulnerable Families (2021–2022, funded by UNICEF)

- Aimed at improving access to health, education, and social services for families with children affected by HIV and chronic diseases.
- Addressed issues of stigma, social inequality, emotional burn out of parents and family stability.

2. Community-Based Rehabilitation (CBR) Consolidation (2021–2023, with Caritas Germany)

- Strengthened regional CBR structures across Kazakhstan, Kyrgyzstan, Tajikistan, and Uzbekistan.
- Trained professionals, developed parent self-help groups, and supported inclusive community services.

3. Curriculum Development for Social Work (UNICEF project)

- Strengthened educational programs to embed community engagement and behavioral change competencies.
- Focused on social norm transformation and enhanced integration with communities.

=== Major Events and Contributions ===
- World Social Work Week (April 2021): Live-streamed international expert panels showcasing career paths and the global impact of social work.
- 3rd International Social Work Forum (Sept 2021): Engaged 1000+ participants (online and hybrid) to explore social work’s role in socio-economic modernization in Kazakhstan. YouTube Day 1
- Trainer Development: Prepared 70 regional trainers in foundational case management through training programs and manuals.
- Central Asian Forums (2022, 2023): Hosted discussions on professional standards and harmonization of educational frameworks for social work across Central Asia.

=== Membership and International Collaboration ===
- Since 2022, NAPSW is an official member of the International Federation of Social Workers (IFSW) and represents Kazakhstan globally.
- Established the Association of Schools of Social Work (ASSW) in partnership with Kazakhstan-Swiss-American College.
- In 2023, ASSW joined the International Association of Schools of Social Work (IASSW).

=== Education and Outreach ===
NAPSW organized numerous virtual learning events, including:

- Thematic Educational Decades: Covering topics such as social rehabilitation, universal-progressive home visiting, case management (in Kazakh and Russian), and supervision in social work.
- Platforms: Events were hosted via Zoom (capacity for 1000 participants) and broadcast on NAPSW's YouTube channel http://www.youtube.com/@Socialwork_Qazaqstan..

=== Social Impact ===
These efforts have contributed to:

- Enhanced professional competencies and service quality
- Adoption of innovative social work practices
- Broader access to continuing education, especially in rural regions
- Stronger interdisciplinary cooperation in healthcare, education, and social services

On 7 October 2022, the NAPSW for the first time took part in the 2022 presidential elections, where it nominated public figure Qaraqat Äbden as a candidate for the race.

== Election results ==
=== Presidential ===
Election year	Candidate	First round			Second round			Result
Election year	Candidate	Votes	%	Rank	Votes	%	Rank	Result
2022	Qaraqat Äbden	206,206	2.60%	3rd	—N/a			Lost ✗
