= Qazaq analary–dästürge jol =

Organization based in Astana, Kazakhstan

QA–DJ
- Kazakh mothers–the way to tradition
- Қазақ аналары–дәстүрге жол
- Headquarters: Astana, Kazakhstan
- Location: Kazakhstan
- Key people: Mara Orazbaeva, chairwoman

The "Qazaq analary–dästürge jol" republican public association (QA–DJ; Kazakh: Қазақ аналары–дәстүрге жол, lit. 'Kazakh mothers–the way to tradition') is a public women's organisation from Kazakhstan.

== History ==
The association was created with the support of the president of Kazakhstan Kassym-Jomart Tokayev in Pavlodar Region in around 2021. As of 16 June 2023, its chairwoman was Aijan Äbılqaiyrqyzy.

On 11 October 2022, a meeting of the QA–DJ was held both in-person and remotely, from which Saltanat Tursynbekova, attorney and civil rights activist, was nominated as a second female candidate after Qaraqat Äbden for the 2022 presidential elections by all 38 members of the QA–DJ.

On 20 June 2023, the association assembled in Tekeli, Kazakhstan to discuss their agenda. Saltanat Tursynbekova attended, as well as chairwoman Ainūr Jügınısova.

On 10 May 2024, the association's Beineu District office opened on Mother's Day. District akim Rahymjan Şalbaev attended the ceremony.

In July 2025, Mara Orazbaeva became the chairwoman of the QA–DJ, replacing Ainūr Jügınısova.

== Organisation ==
As of July 2025, QA–DJ had offices across all regions of Kazakhstan. Around 100 public associations have merged into QA–DJ.

== Ideology ==
The organisation aims to "promote family values and national traditions, honor national heritage, and celebrate our ancestral customs". It also focuses a lot on the "encouraging" of the Kazakh language, the Islamic faith, especially among families and children. Main councillor Zamzagül Mūqanova said its main goal was "preserving national values and traditions in the era of globalization by uniting Kazakh mothers, and setting an example of harmony and unity for future generations".

The QA–DJ has nominated Saltanat Tursynbekova as their presidential nominee in the 2022 Kazakh presidential election. After her nomination, Tursynbekova has outspoken in support of incumbent Kassym-Jomart Tokayev's initiatives, outlining that her presidential campaign would thus focus on social issues, rather than policy.

== Election results ==
=== Presidential ===
Election year	Candidate	First round			Second round			Result
Election year	Candidate	Votes	%	Rank	Votes	%	Rank	Result
2022	Saltanat Tursynbekova	168,731	2.12	5th	—N/a			Lost ✗
