= Mukaghali Makatayev =

Kazakh poet, writer and translator

- Мұқағали Мақатаев
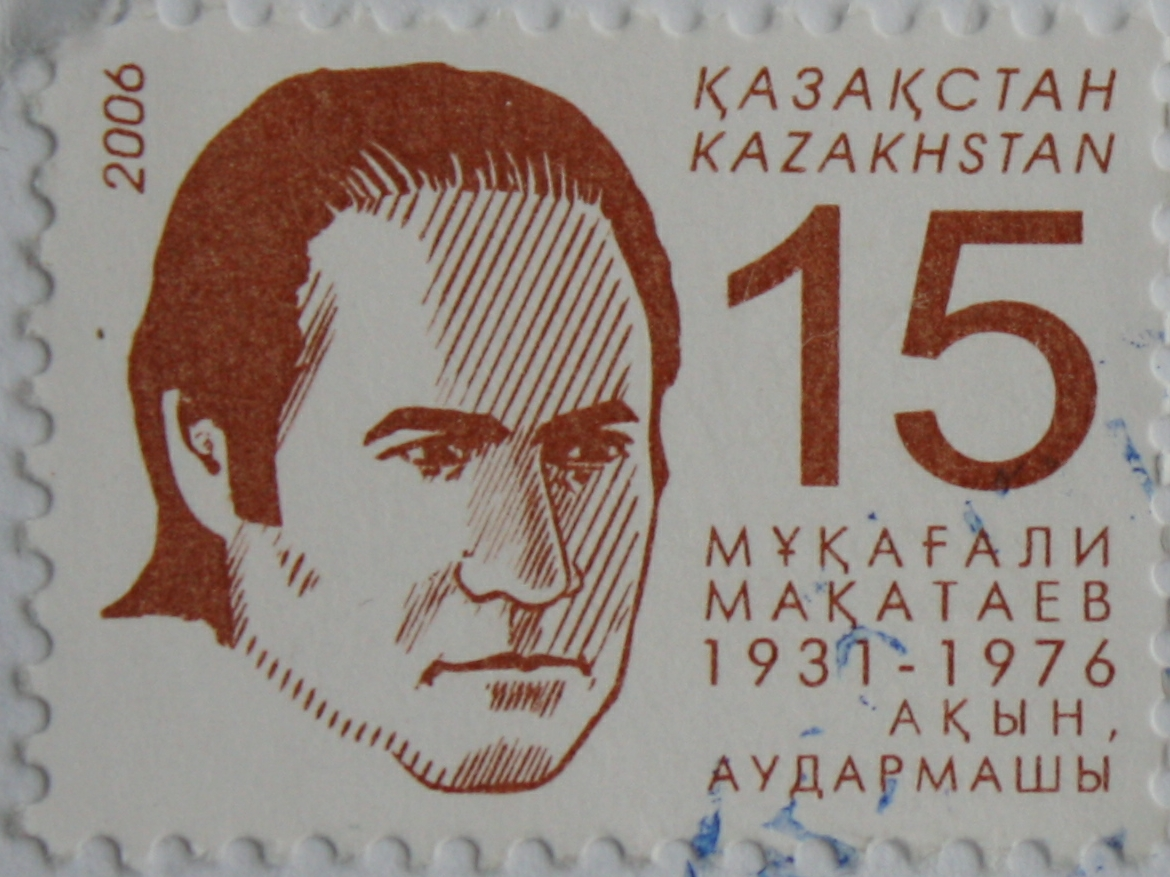
- Born: Mukagali Makatayev; February 9, 1931; Qarasaz village, Raymbek district, Almaty Region
- Died: March 27, 1976 (aged 45); Almaty
- Writing career
- Language: Kazakh language

Mukaghali Makatayev (Kazakh: Мұқағали Мақатаев, Mūqağali Maqataev; February 9, 1931 – March 27, 1976) was a Kazakh poet, writer and translator. Muqagali Maqataev is put on a par with such pillars of Kazakh literature as Abai and Mukhtar Auezov. Fame and recognition came to him after his death. Maqataev lived a short but bright life, leaving to his descendants an extraordinary body of poetry full of national color.

== Early life ==
Muqagali Suleimenovich Maqataev was born on February 9, 1931, in the village of Karasaz, Narynkol district, Almaty region, Kazakh SSR, at the foot of Khan Tengri. At first, his parents named him Mukhametkali, but then his mother considered that the prophet's name carried a great responsibility and began to call the child Mukagali. The boy's father Suleimen worked on the land. In 1940, he became the chairman of the collective farm, but the war interrupted peaceful life. Suleimen went to the front and died in battle. His mother, Nagiman, doted on her first child. When his father went to the front, the 10-year-old boy remained the main man in the family.

== Education and career ==
He graduated from school and began his career as a village council secretary, the head of the red yurt, an employee of the Komsomol organs, and a literary employee of the regional newspaper.

In 1952–1969, he worked in a high school as a teacher of the Russian language, a speaker on the Kazakh Radio, an executive secretary of The Soviet Border (Kazakh: Советтік шекара) newspaper, a literary contributor to the newspapers Socialist Kazakhstan (Kazakh: Социалистік Қазақстан, Sotsıalıstik Qazaqtan) and Culture and Life (Kazakh: Мәдениет және Тұрмыс, Mádenıet jáne Turmys) and the Star (Kazakh: Жұлдыз, Juldyz) magazine. In 1970 he joined the Writers' Union of Kazakhstan. In 1973–1974 he studied at the Moscow Institute of Arts and Letters.

Mukaghali Makatayev's poetic works were first published in 1948. He became famous with his poem «Appassionata» (Kazakh: Аппассионата, 1962). The poems "Lenin" (Kazakh: Ленин, Lenın; 1964) and "The Moor" (Kazakh: Мавр, Mavr; 1970) were devoted to Lenin and Marx. Poetry collections Hello Friends (Kazakh: Армысыңдар достар, Armysyńdar dostar 1966), You came, my Swallow? (Kazakh: Қарлығашым келдің бе?, Qarlyǵashym keldiń be?; 1968), Alas, my heart (Kazakh: Дариға жүрек, Darıǵa jurek; 1972), When swans asleep (Kazakh: Аққулар ұйықтағанда, Aqqýlar uıyqtaǵanda 1974), The warmth of life (Kazakh: Шуағым менің, Shýaǵym meniń; 1975), Poem of Life (Kazakh: Өмір-дастан, Ómir-dastan; 1976), River of Life (Kazakh: Өмір-өзен, Ómir-ózen; 1978), Heart sings (Kazakh: Жырлайды жүрек, Jyrlaıdy júrek; 1-2 Books, 1982), Sholpan (Kazakh: Шолпан, Sholpan; 1984) and others entered the golden fund of the Kazakh national poetry. Prose works were included in the collection titled Two Swallows (Kazakh: Қос қарлығаш, Qos qarlyǵash; 1988). Many of Makatayev's poems were turned into songs.

Makatayev translated into the Kazakh language sonnets of William Shakespeare (1970), poems of Walt Whitman (1969), Dante's Divine Comedy (1971), and other literary works.

== Death ==
Mukaghali Makatayev died in Almaty on March 27, 1976, at the age of 45. In 1999 Mukaghali Makatayev was posthumously awarded the State Prize of the Republic of Kazakhstan for the collection of poems under the title «Amanat».
