= Jasaral Quanyşälin =

Kazakh politician (1949–2023)

- Жасарал Қуанышәлин

Member of the Supreme Council of Kazakhstan
- In office 19 April 1994 – 11 March 1995
- Preceded by: Constituency established
- Succeeded by: Constituency abolished
- Constituency: Äiteke Bi

Chairman of Alğa, Qazaqstan!
- In office 18 April 2022 – 29 March 2023
- Preceded by: Office established
- Succeeded by: Marat Jylanbaev

Chairman of the Azat Civil Movement
- In office 1992–1994
- Preceded by: Mikhail Isinaliyev
- Succeeded by: Hasen Qojahmetov

Personal details
- Born: 7 April 1949 Qarabutaq, Kazakh SSR, Soviet Union (now Qosy Batyr, Kazakhstan)
- Died: 18 May 2023 (aged 74) Almaty, Kazakhstan
- Party: Alğa, Qazaqstan! (2022–2023)
- Other political affiliations: QDT (from 2017); Alğa! (until 2012); Azat, 2008 (2005–2008); Azat, 1990 (1990–1994)
- Spouse: Aisulu Qadyrbaeva
- Children: 2
- Education: Al-Farabi Kazakh National University
- Profession: Journalist, politician

Military service
- Allegiance: Soviet Union
- Branch/service: Soviet Army
- Years of service: 1968–1971

Jasaral Mınajadinūly Quanyşälin (Note: Often transliterated as Zhasaral Minazhadinuly Kuanyshalin through a Russified Romanization of Жасарал Минаждинулы Куанышалин.) (Kazakh: Жасарал Мінажадинұлы Қуанышәлин; 7 April 1949 – 18 May 2023) was a Kazakh politician, journalist, and activist, who served as a member of the Supreme Council of Kazakhstan from 1994 to 1995.

Throughout his political career, Quanyşälin worked in the opposition, being involved in various opposition movements for which he faced arrest in 2006 after criticizing President Nursultan Nazarbayev. Quanyşälin was elected to parliament in 1994 and has participated in the 2004 legislative election, as well as attempting to contest the 2011 and 2022 presidential elections, where he was unable to conduct campaigning or secure the necessary presidential nomination, respectively. Notably, he founded and led the Azat Civil Movement from 1991 to 1994, and in more recent years, he founded and led the unregistered Alğa, Qazaqstan! party from 2022 before stepping down in 2023 for health reasons shortly before his death, after making unsuccessful efforts to officially register the party.

== Early life and career ==
Born in the village of Qarabutaq (now Qosy Batyr) in Bayzak District of the Jambyl Region, Quanyşälin attended Vocational School No. 7 in Aqtöbe from 1966 to 1967, where he learned truck crane operation. Quanyşalin then pursued his higher education in Alma-Ata (now Almaty) at the Faculty of Philology in the S. M. Kirov Kazakh State University, studying from 1972 to 1978 and graduating with a degree in "teacher of Russian language and literature". Additionally, in 1998, he obtained a law degree from the same university through distance learning.

After completing his studies at Aqtöbe Vocational School No. 7, Quanyşälin started his professional career as a truck crane operator at the Stroymekhanizatsiya Aqtöbe Trust. In 1968, he worked as a driver at the Qarabutaq Sanitary and Epidemiological Station shortly before enlisting in the Soviet Army that year, where he served until 1971. From 1971 to 1975, Quanyşälin worked as an instructor at the Qarabutaq District Executive Committee. Following that, he held the position of an instructor at the board of the Kazakhstan Voluntary Society of Book Lovers from 1978 to 1979. Between 1979 and 1986, he served as the executive secretary and editor of the widely circulated Pedagog newspaper at the Abai Kazakh National Pedagogical University. During this time, he also worked as a lecturer at the Department of Kazakh Literature at the institute from 1981 to 1993. In 1993, Quanyşälin became a leading researcher and the head of the Laboratory of Socio-Medical and Demographic Studies at the Kazakh National Women's Teacher Training University.

== Early political career ==
Quanyşälin became actively involved in political activism, beginning with his membership of the Azat Civil Movement of Kazakhstan in 1990, where he played a crucial role in opposing the actions by a group of Cossacks who sought to establish a pro-Russian breakaway state in Kazakhstan. This conflict unfolded in Oral on 15 September 1991, during a period of significant turmoil and the dissolution of the Soviet Union, as Quanyşälin's participation in the Azat party reflected his dedication to upholding Kazakhstan's sovereignty and independence during the pivotal time.

At the party's 1st Congress held on 6 October 1991, Quanyşälin emerged as a prominent figure and was elected as the first deputy chairman of the Azat Civil Movement. Later, in late 1992, Quanyşälin assumed the role of acting chairman presumably due to health issues faced by the party's leader, Mikhail Isinaliyev. This solidified his position as a driving force behind the Azat movement, highlighting his instrumental role in steering the course of the movement towards the establishment of a democratic, multiparty, and independent Kazakhstan. Afterward, Quanyşälin resigned from his leadership position in Azat, paving the way for a new phase in his political career as he transitioned to a role as a deputy after being elected in the 1994 legislative election for the Äiteke Bi electoral district.

During his tenure as a member of the Supreme Council of Kazakhstan, where he served in the Committee on Constitutional Legislation and Human Rights, Quanyşälin made significant contributions to the legislative process. One of his notable achievements was raising important concerns regarding the Jeltoqsan events, from which he actively participated in a successful hunger strike alongside fellow lawmakers, advocating for the establishment of a parliamentary commission to investigate the events. However, his efforts were cut short by the dissolution of the parliament in 1995 by President Nursultan Nazarbayev, prematurely ending his impactful tenure and leaving the issue unresolved.

== Post-parliamentary career and return to opposition ==
Quanyşälin's post-parliamentary career briefly encompassed various roles of administrative and managerial nature in the Aqtöbe Region. From 1998 to 1999, he served as the deputy head of the Aqtöbe Regional Department for Demography and Migration. In 1999, he assumed the position of director at the Aqtöbe Regional Archive. His expertise in information management and public communication led to his appointment as the head of the Aqtöbe Regional Department of Information and Public Consent that year. However, on 1 August 2003, he made a bold move by submitting a resignation letter accompanied by a political statement addressed to President Nazarbayev and the Minister of Culture, Information, and Public Consent, where he expressed his decision to decline prestigious awards and his intention to rejoin the political opposition.

=== 2004 legislative campaign ===
In the 2004 legislative election, Quanyşälin sought to return to the parliament by running as an independent candidate for the lower chamber Mäjilis, aiming to represent the voters' interests of the District 12 for which his bid was ultimately unsuccessful. During his campaign, Quanyşälin in an interview to Navigator, openly voiced his concerns about the Kazakh authorities' disregard for the law and the potential ramifications, in which he highlighted the issue of a "manual parliament", referring to a rubber stamp legislature, and raised the possibility of a subsequent color revolution challenging President Nazarbayev's authority in the lead-up to the upcoming presidential election for 2006.

=== 2006 arrest ===
Following the 2004 legislative elections, Quanyşälin served as a member of the opposition alliance For a Just Kazakhstan, which was formed ahead of the snap 2005 presidential election in support of a candidate Zharmakhan Tuyakbay. During the campaign, Quanyşälin made a public call for the prosecution of President Nazarbayev on charges of treason during a press conference on 5 October 2005 due to Nazarbayev's controversial remarks in August 2005, for which he formally submitted an application to the Prosecutor General's Office and the Supreme Court, requesting the prosecution of Nazarbayev for "high treason and national betrayal". As a result, Quanyşälin was sentenced to two years in prison after being found guilty of "public insult or other infringement upon the honour and dignity of the President of the Republic of Kazakhstan with the use of the mass information media" under Article 318 of the Criminal Code by the Medeu District Court of Almaty on 31 July 2006, to which Quanyşälin appealed the court's decision was released under amnesty.

=== Sanyraq trials ===
In 2007, Quanyşälin became one of founders of the Şanyraq – Kazakhstan public association, which aimed to advocate for the legal rights and protection of landowners and tenants facing eviction in Kazakhstan, address issues of land dispossession and violations of legal procedures, and push for systemic changes in the power structure. The public association was formed in the aftermath of the Şanyraq unrest in July 2006, to which Quanyşälin later linked the incident to the "events of Jeltoqsan or Oral."

Throughout the course of that period, Quanyşälin served as one of the defense attorneys in the Almaty City Court, representing individuals accused of committing crimes during the Şanyraq unrest, with Quanyşälin slamming the court's decision in charging the defendants as a "truly draconian verdict based on the perjury of the Ibragimov brothers."

=== Nağyz Aq Jol membership and the following departure ===
Quanyşälin was a member of the opposition party Nağyz Aq Jol, founded in 2004 after its split from Aq Jol during the same period when Quanyşälin served as an editor of the newspaper Apta.kz, which was later closed down by the Kazakh government in late 2005.

In early 2008, it was revealed that the Nağyz Aq Jol underwent a significant change as it was renamed to Azat, which coincided with the name of the Azat Civil Movement that Quanyşälin was previously actively involved in. Following the change, Quanyşälin announced his intention to leave the party's ranks on 11 March 2008, citing the reason for his decision as the party's renaming, which he regarded as a "fundamental mistake in general", further expressing dissatisfaction with the way the Nağyz Aq Jol party's leadership handled the situation surrounding the renaming process and their lack of resolve in upholding the party's principles which ultimately influenced his decision to leave.

Later, Quanyşälin became one of the main representatives of the unregistered Alğa! party. In 2009, he continued his activities as the chairman of the Alğa, Azattyq! public association.

On 1 May 2010, together with members of the unregistered Alğa! party, Quanyşälin went on a hunger strike in Almaty, where he demanded the release of all political prisoners, fair elections, a fair trial, free media, as well as Nazarbayev's resignation. The hunger strike lasted for more than two weeks until 14 May, and in result led to Quanyşälin being briefly hospitalized.

=== 2011 presidential election ===
On 3 November 2010, Quanyşälin announced his intent to participate in the presidential elections initially scheduled for 2012 from the Jasa, Azattyq! public association and would run for president in a "political tandem" with the leader of the unregistered Alğa! party, Vladimir Kozlov, while not ruling out the possibility of withdrawing his candidacy for Kozlov depending on race polling. He also voiced his support in changing Kazakhstan from presidential to a parliamentary system in a similar reform fashion as it was carried out in Kyrgyzstan. Quanyşälin's announcement took place following brief attacks on Kozlov with eggs by other opposition activists to which Quanyşälin described the incident as an "ugly, shameful act". During that period, a referendum in extending Nazarbayev's presidential term to 2020 was proposed to be held instead of a presidential election, to which Quanyşälin voiced opposition against the controversial move. Following his criticism, a lawsuit against Quanyşälin was filed by a pensioner Seitkerim Qojanazar to the Medeu District Court of Almaty, who accused him of previously slandering him in an August 2006 Epoch newspaper article, an allegation which Quanyşälin denied as being politically motivated. On 12 January 2011, Qojanazar filed another case against Quanyşälin due to his counterclaims on the alleged slander. This resulted in Quanyşälin in not ruling out possibility of withdrawing from the race, citing legal issues if he were to lose the court case against Qojanazar as well as public calls for election boycott by the opposition in which he also announced his support for.

On 11 February 2011, Medeu District Court of Almaty the court ruled in favour of Quanyşälin, where he announced his refusal to participate in the "illegal and absurd elections", citing the impossibility of campaign preparation time of which he blamed Nazarbayev for interference.

=== Post–2011 activities ===
In early 2012, he ran for the Almaty City Mäslihat as an independent from Medeu No. 32 constituency. During the elections, he proclaimed that the ruling Nur Otan party had "no moral right to go to parliament again."

In connection to the December 2011 Janaozen massacre, Quanyşälin became one of founders of the Janaozen-2011 committee in February 2012, where he served as the organization's head of the information group and called for a thorough independent investigation into actions committed by the Kazakh authorities against the protesting oil workers.

In August 2013, Quanyşälin, along with the opposition, openly defended fugitive businessman and former banker Mukhtar Ablyazov against his extradition from France after his initial arrest. Quanyşälin was one of 13 signatories in a letter personally given to the French ambassador in appealing the government of France, French President François Hollande, as well as deputies of the European Parliament to not extradite Ablyazov, where he explained the concrete details regarding the political events and persecution between Ablyazov and the Kazakh authorities as being a "political revenge". Quanyşälin was also among 566 signatories of the September 2013 petition in appealing the Spanish government to forbid the extradition of Aleksandr Pavlov, a close aide of Ablyazov, to Kazakhstan.

Following the 2016 anti-land reform protests, Quanyşälin took part in the Atyrau court trial of activists Maks Boqaev and Talgat Aianov in November 2016, where he called for the acquittal and release of them.

== Later activism and final years ==
In his final years, Quanyşälin continued to maintain close ties with Mukhtar Ablyazov along with openly supporting his unregistered Democratic Choice of Kazakhstan (QDT), for which Quanyşälin faced political pressure due to his involvement. He also accused various opposition parties and movement in allegedly operating under the influence of the Kazakh government, stating that "real opposition parties were destroyed, and now they are gone."

On the eve of Independence Day in December 2018, he was detained by police after attempting to take part in an unsanctioned rally.

In November 2019, Quanyşälin made a public address to President Kassym-Jomart Tokayev, requesting to be saved from "political surveillance and persecution" of Karim Masimov's office.

On 12 March 2020, Quanyşälin along with other activists protested against the blocking of their bank accounts, to which he linked the incident due to his livestream participation with Ablyazov.

In July 2021, Quanyşälin was detained by unknown group of civilians in ahead of his documentary interview by The Qazaq Times. Quanyşälin's subsequent condition was reported by his wife, in which he was hospitalized with a fractured finger and high blood pressure. He was then released from the hospital after a day, where Quanyşälin stressed that "the machine of state repression is intensifying every day."

During the period of massive nationwide protests in January 2022, Quanyşälin was one of demonstrators taking part in the event at the Republic Square in Almaty, where he headed independent coordination headquarters of the protest. Quanyşälin in an interview to Orda.kz reported witnessing live ammunition being fired across the city, for which as evidence he presented a possessed physical cartridge to the journalist. In the aftermath of the unrest on 7 February 2022, he initiated the creation of the Center for the Study of Bloody January, where he accused of the existing investigative commissions, led by lawyers Aiman Omarova and Abzal Quspan of being controlled by the Kazakh authorities and the fact that the protest violence was infiltrated by "criminal elements and disguised law enforcement officers."

Following President Tokayev's early State of the Nation Address in March 2022, Quanyşälin made a public criticism over Tokayev's proposed reforms at a following press conference, from which he noted the ongoing political persecutions and demanded him to intervene in upholding the decision by the Esil District Court of Astana in banning the unregistered parties of the QDT and Köşe under the Article 405, which included sentences given to the parties' activists.

=== Alğa, Qazaqstan! ===
On 18 April 2022, Quanyşälin unveiled the creation of the Alğa, Qazaqstan! party, where as leader of the initiative group, he expressed the need for a "real opposition party" in Kazakhstan and believed that the Kazakh government will not be able to register it, thus instead seek to eliminate the identified gaps in the package of processing documents and re-apply for registration to the Ministry of Justice.

The party garnered about 1,600 signatures by 5 May 2022 needed to legally form an initiative group that would work on creating a political organization, which was ultimately rejected by the ministry due to authenticities of submitted signatures. In response, Quanyşälin cited the refusal decision as being a "political directive from above", stressing that "they told us to check it out ourselves. But we checked everything before applying. We recorded each of them on video. After all, they [Ministry of Justice] themselves must check and indicate specifically the names, which does not correspond. No, they say they won't give an explanation. This defies any logic, what they say is absurd."

Throughout his leadership, Quanyşälin continued to pursue in efforts of unsuccessfully registering the Alğa, Qazaqstan! party, specifically ahead of the 2023 legislative election, all of which attempts were continuously rejected by the Justice Ministry. By the end of Quanyşälin's tenure, the party's submission for registration was rejected in-total of 12 times.

On 29 March 2023, Quanyşälin announced his decision to step down from the position as a chairman of the Alğa, Qazaqstan! organizing committee for health reasons, from which in a statement he stressed that the "Qaraorda" had no intention of registering "a real opposition party" and from there, Quanyşälin suggested prominent marathon runner and public figure Marat Jylanbaev to succeed his leadership role while promising to continue serving as a committee member, a proposal which was unanimously adopted by the party.

=== 2022 presidential election ===
On 17 September 2022, Quanyşälin on social media announced his intention to take part in the 2022 presidential election, where he appealed for public associations "with at least nine branches in the country" to provide him official nomination. From there, he reported in encountering various obstacles to fulfill the requirements in becoming a presidential candidate, one of which was the failure in obtaining a registration of Alğa, Qazaqstan!, making it unfeasible to be legally nominated for presidency by his newly formed party.

Quanyşälin was revealed to be one of the potential candidates for the presidential nomination by the Nationwide Social Democratic Party (JSDP) during the party's 19th Extraordinary Congress on 1 October 2022, for which he ultimately lost the selection process to Nurlan Äuesbaev and shutting down his bid to contest the election. From there, Quanyşälin suggested the JSDP's decision in refusing to nominate him being influenced by the Kazakh authorities, a claim that was dismissed by the JSDP representatives.

== Controversy ==
In April 2014, a scandal broke out around Jarylkap Qalybai, who served as the Añyz Adam editor-in-chief of the controversial publication titled "Hitler is not a fascist", which featured an appraisal opinion piece of Adolf Hitler along with his portrait on the issue cover. Quanyşälin was described to have been one of figures, who was provided platform by same magazine to serve as a publicist.

== Death ==
On 16 May 2023, it was reported that Quanyşälin was hospitalized in Almaty under intensive care due to sudden deterioration of his health after suffering a stroke. He died on 18 May.

Quanyşälin's funeral was held at the Central Mosque Almaty on 20 May 2023, which was attended by Quanyşälin's close colleagues, public figures and activists, with an absence of representatives from the authorities. From there, he was buried at the Keñsai Cemetery. In addition, a public hearing dedicated to Quanyşälin was organized by the People's Voice public association which took place at the Nurgasyr Mosque in Aqtobe on 25 May, where a hundred people showed up including deputy äkim of Aktobe Region, Bulbul Eleusinova, as well as the head of the Internal Policy Department, Läzzat Orazbaeva.
