= Abish Kekilbayev =

Kazakh politician and writer (1939–2015)

- Әбіш Кекілбайұлы
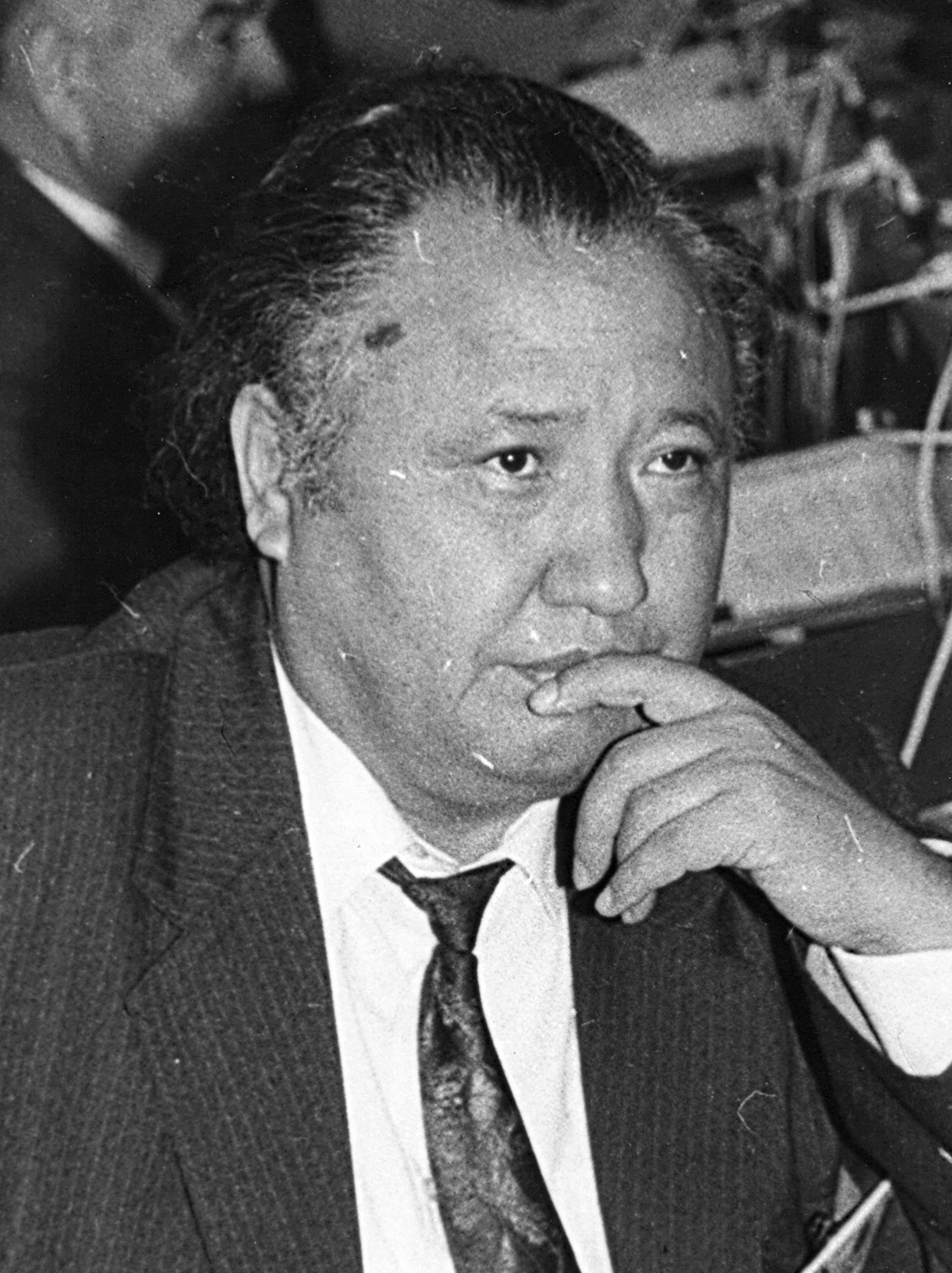
- Kekilbayev in 1993

State Secretary of Kazakhstan
- In office 30 October 1996 – 29 January 2002
- President: Nursultan Nazarbayev
- Preceded by: Akhmetzhan Yessimov
- Succeeded by: Kassym-Jomart Tokayev

Member of the Senate
- In office 24 February 2002 – 11 March 2010
- Appointed by: Nursultan Nazarbayev

Member of the Mazhilis
- In office 30 January 1996 – 30 October 1996
- Preceded by: Constituency established
- Succeeded by: Constituency abolished
- Constituency: 41st Mangystau

Chairman of the Supreme Council
- In office 5 February 1994 – 11 March 1995
- Preceded by: Serikbolsyn Abdildin
- Succeeded by: Office abolished

Member of the Supreme Council
- In office 25 March 1990 – 11 March 1995
- Preceded by: Constituency established
- Succeeded by: Constituency abolished
- Constituency: 166th Bayanaul (1990); 94th Mangystau (1994)

Personal details
- Born: 6 December 1939 Ondy, Kazakh SSR, Soviet Union
- Died: 11 December 2015 (aged 76) Astana, Kazakhstan
- Education: Al-Farabi Kazakh National University

Military service
- Allegiance: Soviet Union
- Branch/service: Soviet Army
- Years of service: 1968–1970
- Battles/wars: Sino-Soviet border conflict

Äbış Kekılbaev (Note: Kazakh: Әбіш Кекілбайұлы, romanized: Äbış Kekılbaiūly, pronounced [æb̥ɘ́ʃ kʰʲekʰɘ̆lb̥ɑ́jʊɫə́]) (6 December 1939 – 11 December 2015) was a Kazakh public and political figure, Hero of Labour of Kazakhstan (2009), People’s Writer of Kazakhstan (1992), and Honored Cultural Worker of the Kyrgyz Republic (1995). He is a laureate of the State Prize, a philologist, and an academician of the Academy of Social Sciences. He also holds the title of Honorary Professor at both Al-Farabi Kazakh National University and L. N. Gumilyov Eurasian National University. Served as a Senator of Kazakhstan from 2002 to 2010, State Secretary of Kazakhstan from 1996 to 2002, and the Supreme Council Chairman from 1994 until its dissolution in 1995.

During the Soviet period, Kekilbayev worked as literary writer in which his work have become a noticeable phenomenon in the literary life of Kazakhstan. He served as the Deputy Minister of Culture of the Kazakh SSR, the second secretary of Board of the Union of Writers, the head of department of the Central Committee of Communist Party of Kazakhstan, Head of the Records Office for Culture and Inter-Ethnic Relations of the Kazakh SSR Presidential Administration, the editor-in-chief of the Egemen Qazaqstan newspaper, the literary employee of the Qazaq adebiety newspaper, the head of literature and art department of the Leninshyl jas newspaper editorial office.

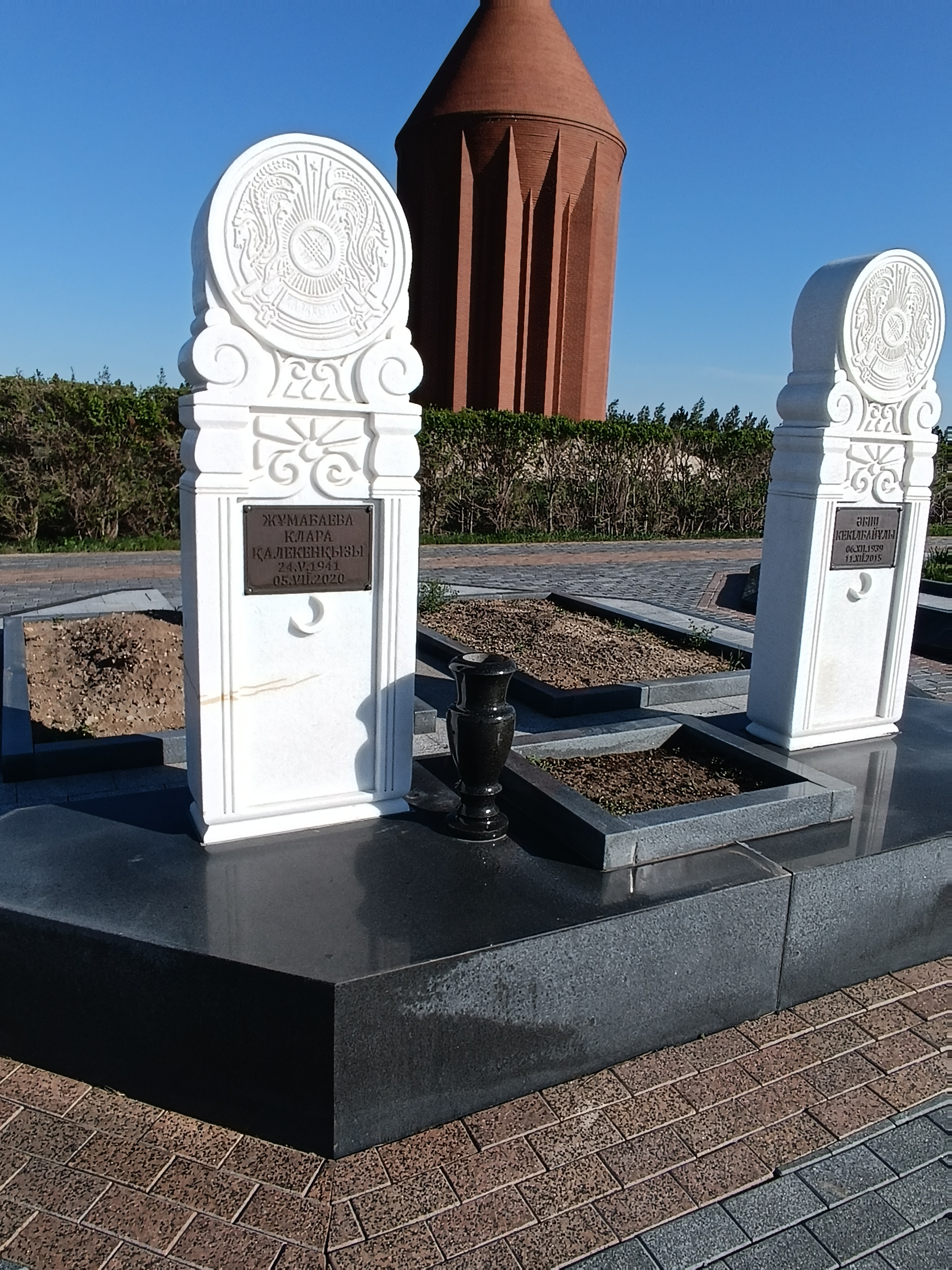
Abish's and his wife's graves in National Pantheon of Kazakhstan.

Throughout his life Kekilbayev was recognized with several awards and titles such as Hero of Labour (firstier kazakh writer and man, which with this award) National Writer of Kazakhstan, laureate of the State Prize, a philologist, academician of the Academy of Social Sciences, Emeritus Professor of Al-Farabi Kazakh National University and of the L. Gumilyov Eurasian State University. Nickname – Abish Tagan.

== Early life and career ==
Born in the village of Ondy, Kekilbayev graduated from the philological faculty of the Al-Farabi Kazakh National University in 1962. He then began his career as a literary employee of the newspaper Qazaq adebieti.

From 1963 to 1965, he was the head of the department of literature and art of the editorial office of the Leninshil jas newspaper. Then he worked in the repertoire and editorial board of the Kazakh SSR Ministry of Culture. In the period from 1968 to 1970, Kekilbayev served in the Central Asian Military District in the ranks of the Soviet Army. During his service, he took part in the border conflict near Lake Zhalanashkol between Soviet border guards and Chinese military personnel.

After joining the Central Committee of the Communist Party of Kazakhstan in 1975, Kekilbaev published a number of essays in the spirit of communist propaganda. When discussing the new 1977 Constitution of the Soviet Union, he instead criticized the Constitution of the United States in the newspaper Socialist Kazakhstan where Kekilbaev wrote saying "Soviet people understand the draft of the new Constitution of the USSR as a new achievement of human thought in the persistent struggle for justice, as a new contribution to the consistent teaching of Marxism-Leninism."

For the next five years, Kekilbayev was the chief editor of the script of the board of the Kazakhfilm Aimanov film studio. In this work, Kekilbayev put a lot of effort, effort and creative inspiration into the creation of screen versions of Kok Serik and Shot at the Kara Pass by Mukhtar Auezov and other films, which are mutually recognized by Kazakh and Kyrgyz filmmakers as joint screen works. With his direct participation at this studio, films such Qyz Jibek, The End of the Ataman, Kok Serik, Trans-Siberian Express and others, rightfully included in the golden fund of Kazakh cinematography and in the history of world cinema were created. By that time, Kekilbayev for a number of years was in charge of the fiction sector of the culture department of the Central Committee of the Communist Party of Kazakhstan. While working as the Kazakh SSR Deputy Minister, he put a lot of effort and effort into the construction of the Central State Museum of Kazakhstan, the Central Concert Hall and other cultural objects that significantly enriched the spiritual life and architectural appearance of Alma-Ata.

Working as the second secretary of the board of the Writers' Union of Kazakhstan, he identified and nurtured a young creative shift of writers, many of whom became prominent in Kazakh literature today. He was twice elected a member of the board of the Union of Soviet Writers, was elected a member of the international committee of Afro-Asian writers, a member of the jury of the Lotus international writers' prize, a member of the board of the Khudozhestvennaya Literatura and Friendship of Peoples central book publishing houses. A fruitful period of his life was also when he was the chairman of the Presidium of the Central Council of the Kazakh Society for the Protection of Historical and Cultural Monuments, and headed the department of interethnic relations of the Central Committee of the Communist Party of Kazakhstan. During this period, thanks to the knowledge and efforts of Kekilbaev, historical monuments of Kazakhstan such as in Turkistan, Sayram, Otrar, Taraz, Mangystau, Shubartau, Atyrau gained worldwide fame. They were included in the route of the Silk Road expedition organized with the support of UNESCO. Kekilbaev enjoyed great authority and recognition from his colleagues and the general public, being the head of the referent for culture and interethnic relations of the Office of the President of the Kazakh SSR.

== Political career ==
=== Member of the Supreme Council and Mazhilis (1990–1996) ===
In 1990, Kekilbayev was elected as deputy of the Supreme Soviet of the Kazakh SSR of the 12th Convocation from the Bayanaul electoral district No. 166 of Pavlodar region (having gained 52.6% of the votes, defeated two rivals), he headed the Committee on National Policy, Development of Culture and Language. With his direct participation, the Laws of the Republic of Kazakhstan "On the press and other mass media", "On the protection and use of historical and cultural heritage", "On freedom of religion and religious associations" and others were prepared and adopted.

From April 1994 through May 1995, he was the Chairman of the 13th Supreme Council of Kazakhstan which put the prerequisites of further development of parliamentarianism in Kazakhstan. Kekilbayev noted that:

"The creation of professional Parliament can be called without any stretch, one of the biggest events in the socio-political life of this year. Undoubtedly, his its work will enter the Kazakh historic calendar as one of the notable milestones in formation of new statehood and democracy... We have never had a professional Parliament and we have to act by the method of trials and errors... Gradually goes the crystallization of powers of the Supreme Soviet, possessing new status."

On the eve of Kazakhstan independence, Kekilbayev addressed the issues of Kazakh language, onomastics, national history, socio-cultural aspects and international relations.

In May 1995, Kekilbayev was appointed State Advisor to the President of the Republic of Kazakhstan. In December 1995. he was elected as a member of the 1st Mazhilis. From there, he served as chairman of the Committee on International Affairs, Defense and Security.

In an interview published in 1995 in the Yegemen Qazaqstan newspaper, Kekilbayev told that "I would not have come into politics if I were not a writer. I would not be an artist, I would not become a fighter. The problems that made me think as an artist are the problems that make me think as a citizen. How can I give up the opportunity to solve problems in real life when I solved them in an imaginary world?"

=== Later political career (1996–2010) ===
From 30 October 1996 to 29 January 2002, Kekilbayev served as State Secretary of Kazakhstan. In 2002, he was an advisor to President Nursultan Nazarbayev. That same year, Kekilbayev was appointed member of the Senate of Kazakhstan and served in the Senate's 2nd, 3rd and 4th convocations. During his term, he became a member of the Asar Political faction in the Parliament in 2004, a party led by Nazarbayev's daughter Dariga. When explained his decision, Kekilbayev responded saying “I became a member not of the Asar party, but of its faction. My goal is to bring real benefits in life and society through lawmaking, the direction of the Asar party is most consistent with this goal."

While working as a Senator, Kekilbayev was a member of National Council of the Republic of Kazakhstan, the Assembly of People of Kazakhstan, Organization of the Central Asian States as well as member of the group of cooperation with the United States Congress, House of Councillors of Japan, and Croatian Parliament.

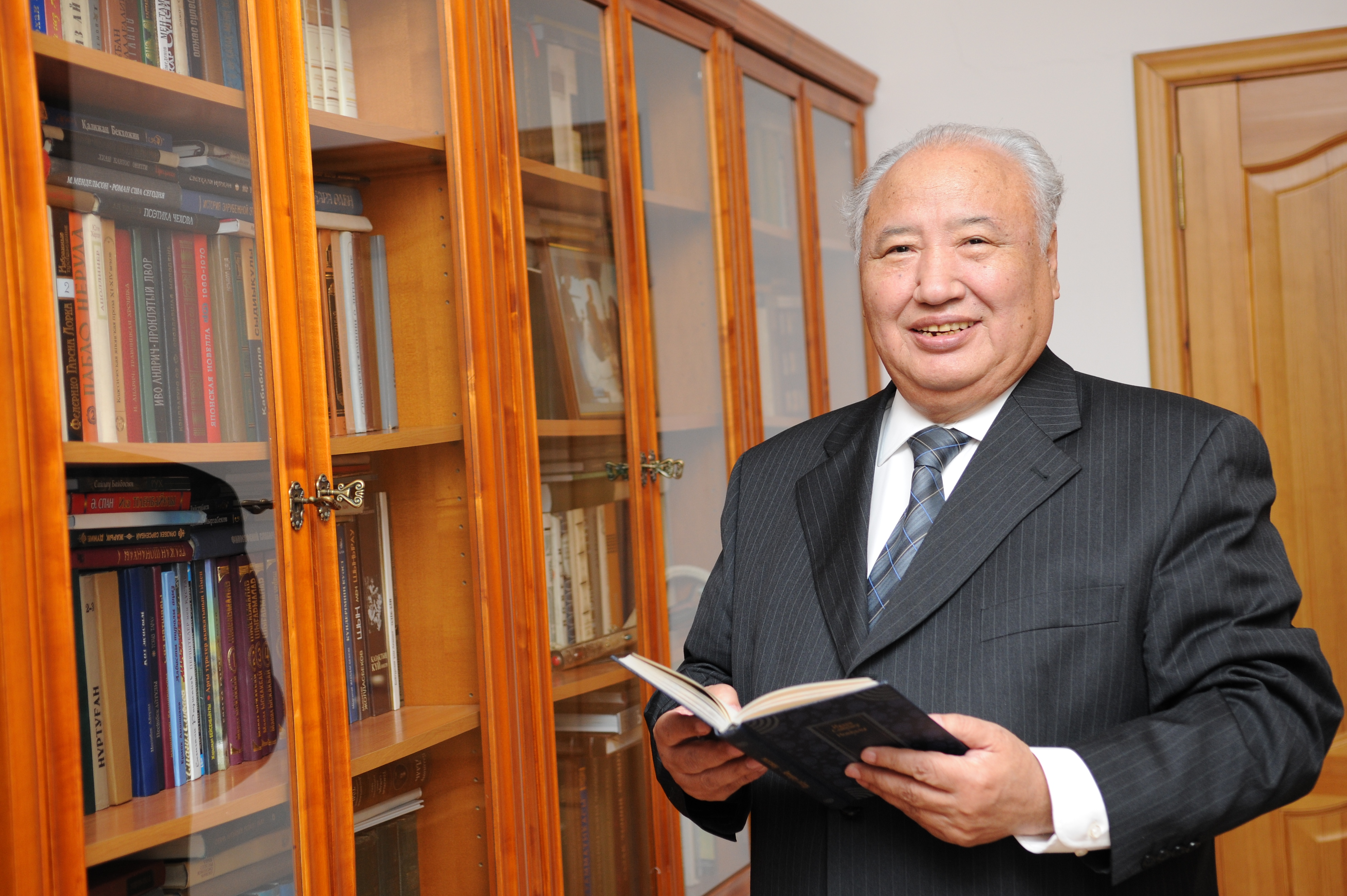
Kekilbayev in 2009

In 2009, during the opening of the Qazaq Eli monument in front of the Palace of Independence, Kekilbaev praised Nazarbayev saying “our genius people know to whom they entrust their fate. The first president is a special president. The central figure of the white marble monument may well become the first president of Kazakhstan, Nursultan Nazarbayev, who is a symbol of our past filled with heroism, filled with the creation of today, full of bold undertakings of tomorrow."

On 11 March 2010, Kekilbayev was removed from the post as a Senator by the Decree.

== Bibliography ==
Kekilbayev translated several renowned works into Kazakh, including Guy de Maupassant's Pierre et Jean and Une vie, Chingiz Aitmatov's Cranes Fly Early, and contributed to the translation of Leo Tolstoy's War and Peace and Ivan Bunin's writings. His translations also brought King Lear and Romeo and Juliet by William Shakespeare, Princess Turandot by Carlo Gozzi, On the Night of the Lunar Eclipse by Mustai Karim, Don Juan oder Die Liebe zur Geometrie by Max Frisch, and Ghosts by Henrik Ibsen to Kazakh audiences, many of which became part of Kazakh theatre repertoires.

As an author, Kekilbayev published the poetry collection Golden Rays (1963) and story collections such as A Flock of Cloud (1966) and Steppe Ballades (1968). His essays and articles include Face to Face with Time, Cranes, Snow in March, The Ballades of the Forgotten Years, The End of a Legend, and Pleiades – Constellations of Hopes.

Kekilbayev's Ballad of Forgotten Years was translated into English and published by Stacey International (London, UK). This prose ballad, written in a bardic style, reflects the ancient rivalry between Kazakh and Turkmen nomads across the endless steppe, capturing their struggles over pasture, livestock, and occasionally, women.

== Honours ==
Kekilbayev was honored with the Order of Nazarbayev and the Order of Fatherland in recognition of his significant contributions to the development of Kazakhstan.

On the eve of Independence Day in 2009, President Nursultan Nazarbayev conferred upon Kekilbayev the highest state title, Qazaqstannyn Enbek Eri (Hero of Labour of Kazakhstan), for his outstanding services to the nation, his contributions to culture and literature, and his active public engagement. The head of state personally presented this prestigious title during a solemn event celebrating Kekilbayev's 70th birthday. Nazarbayev remarked that Kekilbayev’s literary achievements, political involvement, and public service reflect a profound contribution to strengthening Kazakhstan's independence, building a new state, and cultivating a high spiritual life within society.

=== Kazakhstan ===
- Hero of Labour, 2009
- Orden Otan
- Orden of the First President - Nursultan Nazarbayev
- Astana Medal
- Medal "10 Years of Independence of the Republic of Kazakhstan"
- Medal "10th Anniversary of the Constitution of the Republic of Kazakhstan"
- Medal "In Commemoration of the 100th Anniversary of the Railway of Kazakhstan"
- Medal "10 Years of the Parliament of the Republic of Kazakhstan"
- Medal "10 Years of the City of Astana"
- Medal "20 Years of the Independence of the Republic of Kazakhstan"
- Medal "20th Anniversary of the Constitution of the Republic of Kazakhstan"

=== Soviet Union ===
- Order of the Badge of Honour, 1981
