= List of chairmen of the Supreme Soviet of the Kazakh Soviet Socialist Republic =

The Chairman of the Supreme Soviet of the Kazakh Soviet Socialist Republic (from 10 December 1991: Republic of Kazakhstan) was the presiding officer of that legislature.

	Name	Period
1	Salkat Daulenov	July 15, 1938 – September 25, 1939
2	N. Bozzhayev	September 25, 1939 – 1945
3	Gabdulla Tsulanov	July 15, 1945 – March 18, 1947
4	Dzhakip Dzhangozin	March 18, 1947 – March 28, 1952
5	Gabdulla Karzhaubayev	March 28, 1952 – March 28, 1957
6	Shakir Karsybayev	March 28, 1957 – March 26, 1959
7	Saktagan Baishev	March 27, 1959 – March 20, 1962
8	Askar Zakarin	March 20, 1962 – April 11, 1967
9	Shahmardan Yesenov	April 11, 1967 – August 13, 1972
10	Gabit Musrepov	August 13, 1972 – July 16, 1974
11	Sattar Imashev	July 16, 1974 – December 13, 1979
12	Kilybai Medeubekov	December 13, 1979 – February 22, 1990
13	Nursultan Nazarbayev	February 22, 1990 – April 24, 1990
14	Erik Asanbayev	April 25, 1990 – October 16, 1991
15	Serikbolsyn Abildin	December 11, 1991 – December 13, 1993
16	Abish Kekilbayev	December 13, 1993 – March 11, 1995
