= Jeltoqsan National Democratic Party =

- First leader: Hasen Qojahmetov
- Last leader: Amanjol Nalibaev
- Founded: 31 May 1990; 36 years ago
- Dissolved: 11 October 1992; 33 years ago
- Merged into: AQAQ
- Headquarters: Alma-Ata
- Ideology: Nationalism; Parliamentarism

The Jeltoqsan National Democratic Party was an unregistered political party in Kazakhstan. The party was founded on 31 May 1990 by a group of victims of the Jeltoqsan protests that took place in 1986. Its first leader was Hasen Qojahmetov, who was Kazakh nationalist, composer, former political prisoner and the Jeltoqsan protest participant. The main purpose of the party was to free the remaining Jeltoqsan victims from prison, form an independent Kazakhstan, and create a multi-party parliamentary system in the country.

The Jeltoqsan party attempted to nominate its leader Qojahmetov as candidate for the 1991 Kazakh presidential election, however, the party could not collect 100,000 signatures to participate. The Jeltoqsan party claimed that had gathered well over the required signatures to do so and that the Internal Affair Troops attacked the party's facilities and stole around 30,000 signatures as well as the money, making it impossible to field the election.

Starting from May 1992, the Jeltoqsan and the Azat parties along with other opposition groups, held protests in front of the Parliament building in Alma-Ata. The opposition groups demanded the resignation of the government and for the snap parliamentary elections to be held. In the late of that month, Jeltoqsan leader, Qojahmetov, was detained by police and was placed under an administrative arrest. President Nursultan Nazarbayev, in response, demanded an end to the protests and asked the Supreme Soviet to ban anti-government, unregistered political parties. On the morning of 18 June, the riot police moved in and cleared the protester's tent camps. The Interior Ministry claimed that the protests were illegal because the city's authorities did not grant permission for demonstrations to be held in front of the Parliament building. That same year, Amanjol Nalibaev became the leader of the Jeltoqsan party.

On 11 October 1992, the party merged with the Azat Civil Movement of Kazakhstan (AQAQ) that formed the Azat Republican Party of Kazakhstan (AQRP) at the congress due to split that occurred in the AQAQ itself which prompted a need to create a unifying opposition force However, the AQRP became split once again on 20 November 1992 with the Jeltoqsan party being under the AQAQ.
