= Zagipa Baliyeva =

Kazakh politician

MP Zağipa Balieva
- Зағипа Балиева
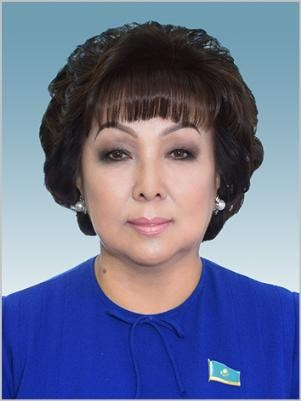
- Official portrait, 2020

Member of the 4th, 5th, and 6th Mäjilis
- In office 3 April 2009 – 10 January 2021

8th Minister of Justice of the Republic of Kazakhstan
- In office April 2005 – 2 April 2009
- President: Nursultan Nazarbayev
- Prime Minister: Karim Massimov; Daniyal Akhmetov
- Preceded by: Onalsyn Zhumabekov
- Succeeded by: Rashid Tusupbekov

Chairman Central Election Commission of the Republic of Kazakhstan
- In office February 1996 – April 2005
- President: Nursultan Nazarbayev
- Prime Minister: Karim Massimov; Daniyal Akhmetov
- Preceded by: Yuri Kim
- Succeeded by: Onalsyn Zhumabekov

Member of the 13th Supreme Council of Kazakhstan
- In office 1994–1995

Personal details
- Born: 3 October 1958 (age 67) Jalanash, Alma-Ata Oblast, Kazakh SSR, Soviet Union
- Party: Nur Otan
- Education: S. M. Kirov
- Profession: lawyer

Zağipa İahiaqyzy Balieva (Note: Often transliterated as Zagipa Yakhyanovna Baliyeva through a Russified Romanization of Загипа Яхяновна Балиева.) (née Isakova; Kazakh: Зағипа Яхияқызы Балиева; born on 3 October 1958) is a Kazakh politician who served as the Minister of Justice of Kazakhstan from 13 April 2006 to April 2009. Baliyeva previously served as the Chairwoman of the Central Electoral Commission from 1996 until 13 April, when Onalsyn Zhumabekov replaced her and she became the Minister of Justice. She became a member of Otan political party on 30 May 2006.

== Biography ==
Zagipa Balieva was born on 3 October 1958, in the village of Jalanash, Kegen District, Almaty Region.

She began her career as a laboratory assistant at a vocational school and worked in this institution from 1975 to 1976.

In 1981, she graduated from the Kazakh State University named after Kirov, specializing as a lawyer.

From 1981 to 1982, she worked as a legal advisor of the Dzhambul Regional Construction Bank.

From 1986 to 1992, she was the head of the department for accounting and distribution of living space of the Almaty City Executive Committee.

Then, from 1992 to 1994, she took up the post of the Head of the Legal Department of the Office of the Head of the Almaty City Administration.

Balieva was the Member of the Supreme Council of the Republic of Kazakhstan of the XIII convocation from 1994 to 1995, also worked as deputy chairman of the Committee of the Supreme Council of Kazakhstan on economic reform.

In March 1995, Balieva was a Secretary, then since January 1996 worked as the Chairman of the Central Election Commission.

For 9 years, from 1996 to 2005, she worked as a senior chairman of the Central Election Commission of Kazakhstan.

From April 2005 to 2 April 2009, Balieva coped with the post of the Minister of Justice of the Republic of Kazakhstan.

From 3 April 2009 to 10 January 2021, she was the Deputy of the Mazhilis, Member of the Committee on Legislation and Judicial and Legal Reform of the Mazhilis of the Parliament of the Republic of Kazakhstan.

Also from 25 March 2016 to 12 June 2018, she was the ombudsman for the rights of the children in Kazakhstan.

From 10 March 2021, she was working as Vice-Rector of the Kazakh National Agrarian University in Almaty.

== Education ==
First, she graduated from Kazakh State University in 1981, where she became a lawyer.

Then, after her studies at the Kazakh Economic University, she became an international economist.

== Family ==
She is married to Muhtar Baliev, has four sons, Daniyar, Ernar, Aliyar, and Nursultan, and two daughters, Aldara and Daria.

Her husband, Baliev, has been running a small business called an LLC "OASIS TAU ALMATY" since 2006.

Her eldest son, Daniyar, is the head of "DL Construction" LLP, which is filing claims for allegedly violated rights of "Kcell", as well as cable TV operators. Also, Daniyar is trying to force Kazakh radio stations to pay twice for the broadcast of foreign songs.
