= Jambyl Regional Mäslihat =

Unicameral local legislature of Kazakhstan

Jambyl Regional Mäslihat Жамбыл облыстық мәслихаты
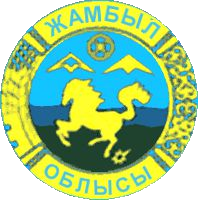

Type
- Type: Unicameral

History
- Founded: 10 December 1993

Leadership
- Secretary: Mahmetğali Sarybekov, Nur Otan since 15 January 2021

Structure
- Seats: 36
- Political groups: Majority (30); Nur Otan (30); Opposition (6); Ak Zhol (3); Auyl (3)
- Length of term: 5 years

Elections
- Voting system: Party-list proportional representation Largest remainder method
- Last election: 10 January 2021
- Next election: 2026

The Jambyl Regional Mäslihat (Kazakh: Жамбыл облыстық мәслихаты) is a unicameral local legislature of the Jambyl Region. Convening in Taraz, the Mäslihat consists of 36 members and three parties of which are the Nur Otan (NO), Ak Zhol Democratic Party (AJ), and Auyl People's Democratic Patriotic Party (AUYL) in which the NO controls the supermajority of 30 seats. The Secretary of the Mäslihat is currently Mahmetğali Sarybekov (NO).

Elections to the Jambyl Regional Mäslihat are held every five years and with its mandates allocated through proportional representation since 2021.

== History ==
The Regional Mäslihat was formed on the basis of the Law 2578-XII "On local representative and executive bodies of the Republic of Kazakhstan" which was adopted on 10 December 1993 by the then-existing Supreme Council of Kazakhstan. For the first time, members for the Mäslihat, including other local races, were chosen through secret ballot in elections for a five-year term which were held on 7 March 1994 and coincided with the general elections as well. The practice continued to be in place until 2018, when the Parliament of Kazakhstan approved new bill which changed the electoral system for local races, granting parties to from their own party-lists for mäslihats and to form parliamentary groups within the legislatures.

In the 2021 Jambyl regional elections, the Nur Otan (NO) won an overwhelmingly majority of 30 seats while the Ak Zhol Democratic Party (AJ), and Auyl People's Democratic Patriotic Party (AUYL) had managed to win enough votes to withstand the 7% electoral threshold and win each three mandates. The Nur Otan Jambyl regional branch on 15 January 2021 held a meeting in the Mäslihat where Muqaş İskandirov was unanimously chosen as the parliamentary leader of NO in the Mäslihat while Mahmetğali Sarybekov was elected as the Mäslihat Secretary.

== Elections ==
Mäslihat members are generally up for re-election every 5 years and are elected on the basis of party-list proportional representation with a required 7% electoral threshold to win any seats in the legislature. If only one parties manages to bypass the electoral threshold, then the party win the second highest number of votes is granted enough seats for representation in the mäslihat regardless whether it had passed the threshold or not. A member of the mäslihat may be a citizen of Kazakhstan who has reached 20 years of age and can be a member of only one mäslihat.

== Powers and functions ==
In accordance with the Article 20 of the Constitution of Kazakhstan "On local government and self-government in the Republic of Kazakhstan"

- A member of a mäslihat expresses the will of the population of the corresponding administrative-territorial units, taking into account national interests.
- The powers of a member of a mäslihat begin from the moment of his registration as a deputy of a mäslihat by the relevant territorial election commission and terminate from the moment of termination of the powers of a mäslihat.
- The powers of a member of a mäslihat shall be terminated ahead of schedule in the following cases:
1. Election or appointment of a deputy to a position, the occupation of which, in accordance with the legislation of the Republic of Kazakhstan, is incompatible with the performance of deputy duties;
2. entry into legal force of a court decision on the recognition of a member incapacitated or partially incapacitated;
3. Termination of powers of mäslihat;
4. Death of a member by entry into force of a court declaration;
5. Termination of his citizenship of the Republic of Kazakhstan;
6. Entry into legal force of the court's conviction against the member;
7. Leaving for permanent residence outside the relevant administrative-territorial unit;
8. In connection with the personal resignation of the member;
9. Systematic failure of a member to fulfill his duties, including absence without good reason at plenary sessions of the mäslihat session or meetings of the mäslihat bodies to which he was elected, more than three times in a row;
- The decision on the early termination of the powers of a deputy is made at a session of the mäslihat by a majority of votes from the total number of present deputies upon the presentation of the relevant territorial election commission.
- Members of mäslihats who carry out their activities on a permanent or vacant basis, paid from the state budget, are not entitled to carry out entrepreneurial activities, independently participate in the management of an economic entity, engage in other paid activities, except for pedagogical, scientific or other creative.

== Composition ==
The last election for the Jambyl Regional Mäslihat was held on 10 January 2021. The Nur Otan (NO) currently controls supermajority of seats.

Party	Seats
Nur Otan (NO)	30 / 36
Ak Zhol Democratic Party (AJ)	3 / 36
Auyl People's Democratic Patriotic Party (AUYL)	3 / 36

== See also ==
- Mäslihat
- 2021 Jambyl Regional Mäslihat election
