= Hasen Qojahmetov =

Activist

Leader of the Azat Civil Movement
- Incumbent
- Assumed office 1994
- Preceded by: Jasaral Quanyşälin

Leader of the Jeltoqsan National Democratic Party
- In office 1991–1992
- Preceded by: Position established
- Succeeded by: Amanjol Nalibaev

Personal details
- Born: 9 August 1949 (age 76) Matay, Kazakh SSR, Soviet Union
- Education: Tchaikovsky Musical College; Al-Farabi Kazakh National University
- Occupation: Political activist, composer

Hasen Káripjanuly Qojahmetov (Kazakh: Хасен Кәріпжанұлы Қожахметов; born 9 August 1949) is a Kazakh political activist, composer, journalist, member of the Writers Union of Kazakhstan, and a participant in the 1986 Jeltoqsan uprising. He is known to be a critical opponent of Nursultan Nazarbayev and attempted to be a candidate in the 1991 and 2015 Kazakh presidential elections.

== Early life, education ==
Qojahmetov was born in a railway station in the village of Matay in the Aksu District and was one of ten children. His father, Karmijan Qojahmetov, was a railroad engineer, machinist and a disabled World War II veteran who was from Semey and happened to leave the town before the Soviet Union tested its first nuclear bomb on 29 August 1949 there. His mother was half Polish and Ukrainian and was transferred to Zhetysu in 1910.

In 1969, Qojahmetov was conscripted to the army while he was studying at the Tchaikovsky Musical College in the city of Alma-Ata. There, he faced terrible conditions at the training center which mostly had Russians, and constant physical and emotional abuse by his peers. Qojahmetov was accused of starting a nationalist sentiment and was punished by being isolated from others in a locked place for 2 years. As a result, he ended up escaping the facility in February 1970 by walking next to a railroad track and sneaking into different train wagons where he eventually made it to Alma-Ata. There, he complained about the discrimination in the Soviet Army, dealt with a court suit where he found lack of support and was sent to a psychiatric hospital. After that, he returned to his musical college where he graduated in 1972.

Since 1998, Qojahmetov is the director of the Kazakh Museum of Folk Musical Instruments in Almaty.

== Political activities ==
At the age of 20, Qojahmetov became a nationalist and believed that Kazakhstan is better off as an independent country. Throughout the 1970s, he lived and worked in Esik, wrote poems and articles criticizing the Soviet Union. In the autumn of 1975 and in April 1977, Qojahmetov produced anti-government leaflets. He came to Alma-Ata to distribute 670 articles and leaflets to expose the discriminatory policies of the Soviet Union and the CPSU to the students of the Veterinary Institute. As a result, he was imprisoned for two years in prison.

After being released from prison in 1979, Qojahmetov composed music and worked as a director and a teacher at various musical colleges where he gained prominence.

He participated in the Jeltoqsan riot that took place in December 1986. Qojahmetov was convicted and sent to prison where he was forced to do physical labor. However, he was later released on 7 March 1989. After the event, Qojahmetov worked as a TV music editor. In 1991, he became the leader of the Jeltoqsan National Democratic Party.

From September 1991, Qojahmetov organized protests in Alma-Ata to release protesters who were involved in Jeltoqsan, allow direct presidential elections, and for Kazakhstan to declare its independence from the Soviet Union by 16 December, the 5th anniversary of Jeltoqsan riot. After the Supreme Council of the Kazakh SSR announced elections on 16 October 1991, Qojahmetov sought to be a candidate. However, the deadline for collecting signatures was shortened and Qojahmetov claimed that his signature collection was confiscated by the police.

In early 1992, Qojahmetov led protests across Kazakhstan. In 1994, he became the leader of the Azat Civil Movement of Kazakhstan. In 1995, Nazarbayev proposed extending his term and changing the constitution. Qojahmetov led a hunger strike near the parliament building however by then, he had little support.
