= Kyzylordinskiye vesti =

Кызылординские вести
- Editor: Zh. M. Isaev
- Founded: 1 January 2021
- Language: Russian
- Website: kzvesti.kz

Kyzylordinskiye vesti (Russian: Кызылординские вести, Kyzylorda news) is a Russian language newspaper published in Kyzylorda Region, Kazakhstan.The newspaper began publication on 1 January 1930 under the name Leninskij Put' (Ленинский путь). As the rural population of the area was predominantly Kazakh-speaking, at the beginning of its circulation, the newspaper had limited influence in contrast to the Kazakh-speaking Syr Bojy (Сыр бойы) which had predominantly agricultural theme. When Leninskij Put' ceased publication from 15 September 1930 to 23 October 1932 due to administrative restructuring of the area and from 2 February 1933 to 1938 due to lack of financial resources it circulated as a branch of Syr Bojy. In 1938 it was reissued when the Kyzylorda region was established and Kyzylorda became the administrative center. The newspaper functioned as a party and administrative official paper. During this period, its readability increased and it was even distributed outside its region. The publication was temporarily suspended from 1964 until 1965 when it resumed publication under the name "Lenin's Way" (Путь Ленина). After the dissolution of the Soviet Union, the newspaper continued to be published under the name Kyzylordninskye Vesti. The newspaper was awarded an honorary diploma by the Supreme Soviet of the Kazakh SSR in 1975 and the Order of the Badge of Honour on January 22, 1980.
