= Vice President of Kazakhstan =

Political position in Kazakhstan

Vice President of the Republic of Kazakhstan
- Қазақстан Республикасының Вице-Президенті (Kazakh); Вице-Президент Республики Казахстан (Russian)
- Emblem of Kazakhstan

- Flag of Kazakhstan

- Incumbent; Erlan Karin since 31 August 2026
- Member of: Cabinet
- Appointer: Popular vote, or if vacant, President
- Term length: 7 years
- Constituting instrument: Constitution of Kazakhstan
- Formation: 1 July 2026; 3 months ago (current) (Note: 16 December 1991; 34 years ago (Republic) 20 April 1990; 36 years ago (Kazakh SSR))
- First holder: Sergey Tereshchenko (Kazakh SSR); Yerik Asanbayev (Republic)
- Succession: First

The vice president of Kazakhstan (Note: Kazakh: Қазақстан вице-президенті; Qazaqstan vitse-prezidentı; Russian: вице-президент Казахстана; vitse-prezident Kazakhstana) is the second-highest ranking political office in Kazakhstan, after the president of Kazakhstan. The position has been re-established since 1 July 2026 and is currently held by Erlan Karin since August 2026.

The position existed previously from 1991 to 1996. In 1990, there was also the post of vice-president of the Kazakh Soviet Socialist Republic.

== History ==
President Nursultan Nazarbayev issued a decree on 22 February 1996 removing Erik Asanbayev from his post.

In 2026, President Kassym-Jomart Tokayev, in an address to the National Kurultai, announced plans to reinstate the position of Vice President in case the initiative is supported during that year's constitutional referendum. After the 2026 Kazakh constitutional referendum, Tokayev's proposed Constitution was adopted and the position of Vice President was re-established on 1 July 2026.

During a 23 August 2026 press conference after having voted in the 2026 Kazakh legislative election, President Tokayev announced that his vice presidential appointee would be revealed next week, which is until 30 August, or in 10 days, which is 2 September.

== Duties and responsibilities ==
On 5 September 2026, President Tokayev signed the Presidential Decree "On the Duties of the Vice President" No. 1452 into action. It highlighted the Vice President's duties and responsibilities, which included developing strategic initiatives in domestic and foreign policy and submitting them to the President. Thus, at the President's direction, the Vice President represents the President in relations with the Kurultai, Government, other state bodies, political parties, public associations, and international organizations, and participates in international events.

The Vice President heads the Secretariat of the Congress of Leaders of World and Traditional Religions and oversees the activities of the Kazakhstan Institute for Strategic Studies under the President. Additionally, the Vice President coordinates the work of several presidential commissions and councils, including those concerning state awards, citizenship, heraldry, overseas personnel training, state prizes in science and technology and literature and the arts, and youth policy. The Vice President may issue orders, give instructions to central and local executive bodies, attend meetings of the Kurultai, Government, and presidential advisory bodies, request information and documents from state authorities, and establish interdepartmental working groups to prepare draft presidential acts.

== List of vice presidents (1990–present) ==
=== Kazakh SSR (1990–1991) ===
No.	Portrait	Name	Took office	Left office	Election	Party	President	Ref
1		Sergey Tereshchenko	April 1990	May 1990	1990	QKP	Nursultan Nazarbayev	
2		Yerik Asanbayev	16 October 1991	16 December 1991	–	QKP	Nursultan Nazarbayev	—

=== Vice President of Kazakhstan (1991–present) ===
No.	Portrait	Name	Took office	Left office	Party	Election	President	Notes
(2)		Yerik Asanbayev	16 December 1991	22 February 1996	Independent	1991	Nursultan Nazarbayev	
Office abolished (30 years, 129 days)
Vacant (61 days)						–	Kassym-Jomart Tokayev	
3		Erlan Karin	31 August 2026	Incumbent	Independent	–	Kassym-Jomart Tokayev	

== See also ==
- List of leaders of Kazakhstan
- President of Kazakhstan
- Prime Minister of Kazakhstan
