= 1991 Kazakh presidential election =

← 1990	1 December 1991	1999 →
- Turnout: 88.23%
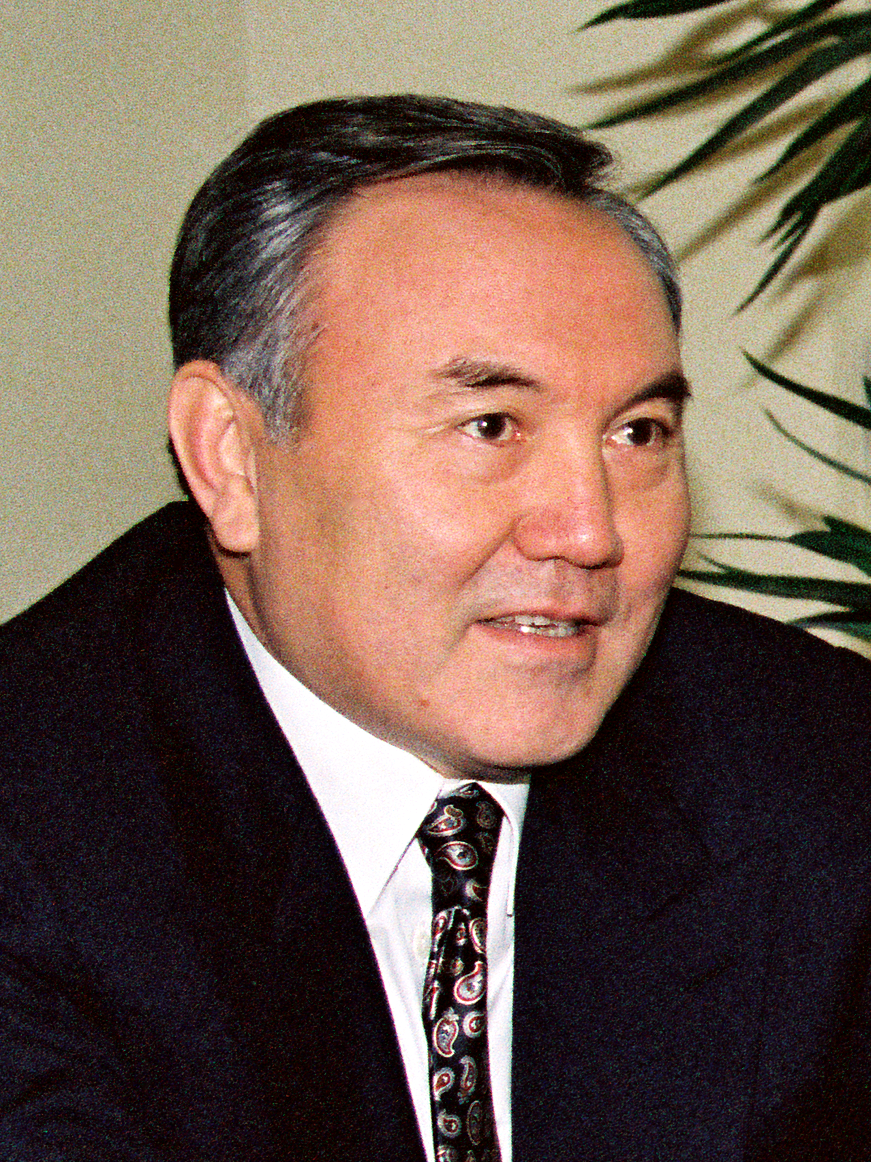
Nominee	Nursultan Nazarbayev
Party	Independent
Running mate	Yerik Asanbayev
Popular vote	8,681,276
Percentage	98.78%
President before election
Nursultan Nazarbayev
Independent
Elected President
Nursultan Nazarbayev
Independent

Presidential elections were held in Kazakhstan for the first time on 1 December 1991. Nursultan Nazarbayev was elected with 99% of the vote, based on a turnout of 88%.

== Background ==
On 24 April 1990 the Supreme Council of the Kazakh SSR established the post of President of the Kazakh SSR and chose its chairman Nursultan Nazarbayev to be the president for a term of 6 years.

Due to the preceding events of the collapse of the Soviet Union, on 16 October 1991 the Supreme Council of the Kazakh SSR set the election day for 1 December. The law established requirements for a 100,000 signatures in order to be qualified to be a presidential candidate, which coincided with the requirements of the relevant law of the Russian SFSR, although the population of the Kazakh SSR was several times smaller.

On 24 October 1991 Nazarbayev was registered by the Central Election Commission to be the incumbent candidate with his running mate Yerik Asanbayev as vice president to be on a secret ballot.

The members of the Supreme Council proposed a writer, Olzhas Suleimenov, to be the candidate but he declined the offer. Hasen Qojahmetov, leader of the Jeltoqsan National Democratic Party, did not have the required number of signatures for the election.

== Results ==
Candidate	Party	Votes	%
Nursultan Nazarbayev	Independent	8,681,276	98.78
Against		107,252	1.22
Total		8,788,528	100.00
Valid votes		8,788,528	100.00
Invalid/blank votes		198	0.00
Total votes		8,788,726	100.00
Registered voters/turnout		9,961,242	88.23
Source: Nohlen et al.
