= Azat Republican Party of Kazakhstan =

- Abbreviation: AQRP
- Chairman: Toleubek Karamendin
- Founded: 5 September 1991; 34 years ago
- Split from: AQAQ
- Headquarters: Almaty
- Ideology: Kazakh nationalism National conservatism

Party flag

The Azat Republican Party of Kazakhstan (English: Freedom) is an unregistered political party in Kazakhstan that is led by Chairman Toleubek Karamendin. It was one of the most active of the political movements during the struggle for Kazakhstan's independence. However, once this was achieved, its membership reduced considerably with some going to the Azamat movement and others to the Republican party.

A new law on political parties which came into force on 19 July 2002 required existing political parties to undergo state re-registration within the subsequent six months. Perhaps as a result of this, the Republican Party, the Azamat (Citizen) party and the People's Congress of Kazakhstan united into the United Democratic Party.

The most powerful Kazakh organization is the citizens movement "Azat" (Freedom). Azat was the most active of all political movements during the struggle for Kazakhstan's independence; after the achievements of this the number of Azat members shrunk considerably. Today it is divided into the Azat movement (united with Zeltoksun) and the Republican party of Kazakhstan. The latter is more loyal to Nazarbaev's regime, while the former accuses the regime of conducting "anti-Kazakh" policies. However, these parties are poorly organized, do not have their views represented in solid periodicals on a regular basis and do not enjoy support of either the state or businessmen.

Jarig Bakker, 11 December 1998

== See also ==
- Azat Civil Movement of Kazakhstan
