= Yerik Asanbayev =

Vice President of Kazakhstan from 1991 to 1996

- Ерік Асанбаев
- Asanbayev in c. 2000

Vice President of Kazakhstan
- In office 16 December 1991 – 22 February 1996
- President: Nursultan Nazarbayev
- Preceded by: Office established; Himself (as Vice President of Kazakh SSR)
- Succeeded by: Erlan Karin (2026)

2nd Vice President of Kazakh SSR
- In office 16 October 1991 – 16 December 1991
- President: Nursultan Nazarbayev
- Preceded by: Sergey Tereshchenko
- Succeeded by: Office abolished; Himself (as Vice President of Kazakhstan)

Chairman of the Supreme Soviet of the Kazakh Soviet Socialist Republic
- In office 25 April 1990 – 16 October 1991
- Preceded by: Nursultan Nazarbayev
- Succeeded by: Serikbolsyn Abdildin

Personal details
- Born: 10 March 1936 Baigabul, Turgay Oblast, Kazakh SSR, Soviet Union
- Died: 23 August 2004 (aged 68) Almaty, Kazakhstan

Erık Mağzūmūly Asanbaev (Note: Often transliterated as Yerik Magzumovich Asanbayev through a Russified Romanization of Ерик Магзумович Асанбаев.) (Kazakh: Ерік Мағзұмұлы Асанбаев; 10 March 1936 – 23 August 2004) was a Kazakh politician, who was Vice President of Kazakhstan from 1991 to 1996.

== Early life ==
Yerik Asanbayev was born on 10 March 1936, in Baigabul village, Amangeldi District, Turgai province.

== Career ==
From 1959 to 1967, Asanbayev was teaching and working on scientific projects in Moscow and Almaty. In 1963 he became the head of financial planning department and interbranch balance at the scientific and research institute of economics at State Planning Agency of the Kazakh Soviet Socialist Republic.

Asanbayev was a member of the council of ministers of the Kazakh Soviet Socialist Republic and Central Committee of the Communist Party of Kazakhstan from 1967 to 1986, and then become the deputy head of department at the Central Committee of the Communist Party of Kazakhstan. In 1988 he was appointed as deputy Chairman of the council of ministers of Kazakh SSR. In 1989 he became the secretary of the central committee of the Communist Party of Kazakh SSR.

In April 1990, Asanbayev became the chairman of the Supreme Soviet of the Kazakh SSR. On 16 October 1991, Asanbayev was elected as the Vice President of Kazakh SSR by the Supreme Soviet. In December 1991, he was elected in popular elections. The position of vice president was eliminated by the 1993 constitution, but it allowed Asanbayev to continue to serve as vice president until 1996. He continued as the vice president of Nursultan Nazarbayev until February 1996, when he was reassigned as Ambassador to Germany where he served until July 2000.

== Works cited ==
- Mishra, Mukesh (2009). "Democratisation Process in Kazakhstan: Gauging the Indicators". India Quarterly. 65 (3). Sage Publishing: 313–327. doi:10.2307/45072948. JSTOR 45072948.
