= Onalsyn Zhumabekov =

Kazakhstani minister

Onalsyn Islamuly Zhumabekov (Kazakh: Оңалсын Исламұлы Жұмабеков, Oñalsyn Islamūly Jūmabekov; born 1949) has served as the Chairman of the Central Electoral Commission in the Government of Kazakhstan since the Majilis confirmed him on 13 April 2006. He replaced Zagipa Baliyeva, who replaced him as the Minister of Justice. He previously served as the General Public Prosecutor.

== Justice Ministry ==
Zhumabekov announced that the government planned on instituting a moratorium on capital punishment on 16 July 2004. The moratorium would take effect on 1 January 2004. A new prison for convicts serving life terms is already being built on top of Khimpron factory, a former chemical weapons production facility, in Pavlodar. The prison, which will cost 800 million tenge (USD $5.5 million) to build, will house 500 prisoners. Zhumabekov told reporters, "Our state is currently seeking to resolve the issue of abolishing the death penalty, initially through the moratorium, and of the introduction of the life imprisonment. We have looked at the former building of Khimprom, and we think of building the facility on its foundation."

In a poll taken shortly after the government proposed the moratorium 69% of respondents opposed the moratorium and 31% supported it. There were 96 convicts on death row in 1999, 71 in 2000, 65 in 2001, 51 in 2002, and 28 as of 1 June 2003. President Nazarbayev pardoned eight convicts in 1999, four in 2000 and 2001, and two in 2002. Death sentences were commuted to prison terms for 23 convicts in 1999, 18 in 2000, 14 in 2001, 5 in 2002, and 3 in 2003. First-degree murder is a capital punishment, but only 5% of convicted murderers are put to death.

== Central Election Commission ==
=== Confirmation hearings ===
During his confirmation hearings he said he would "spare no efforts to make sure elections at all levels are conducted with maximum openness, transparency, fairness, and our laws are observed." The Majilis voted unanimously in favor of his nomination, 56–0. He thanked the Majilis and promised to do his best to "provide for [the] rights and freedoms of each Kazakhstani citizen, whether a voter or a candidate." Justice Minister Baliyeva wished Zhumabekov "great successes, patience, and wisdom... With such a brilliant parliament, such a brilliant president, our brilliant country will be the first in the world, I am sure of this. Moreover, we have a brilliant and intelligent opposition. I hope it will continue this way." Adilbek Zhaksybekov, head of the presidential administration called Zhumabekov "an experienced and respected lawyer, a leader who did much for the last 2 years for creating legal groundwork for the state. At the high position of a Justice Minister, he proved to be a specialist of highest qualification, a talented administrator. [He] went an uneasy path in his life and career from an investigator of district prosecution to the first deputy of General Public Prosecutor." Majilis parliamentarian Tito Syzdykov called him a "good lawyer, politically mature person, well-known in the society and a man of principle."

Parliamentarian Amangeldy Aitaly questioned Zhumabekov regarding his role as the prosecutor in the Almaty oblast in December 1986 when the government put down anti-Communist demonstrations. Zhumabekov denied any involvement, saying that "interior affair bodies, prosecution of Kazakhstan and [the] prosecution of Almaty city" dealt with relevant criminal cases and that the prosecution for Almaty oblast had not taken on any cases in relation to the protests.

=== Ban on demonstrations ===
The Parliament of Kazakhstan reversed a ban on demonstrations between election day and the release of election results on 24 November 2006. The ban, originally instated in March 2005 in response to the Tulip Revolution in Kyrgyzstan. Zhumabekov told Parliament that the Organization for Security and Cooperation in Europe's criticism of elections in Kazakhstan did not affect Parliament's decision to abolish the ban. Zhumabekov said Kazakhstan had the right to disagree with the OSCE.

=== Kazakh presidential election, 2005 ===
The Kazakhstan presidential election of 2005 was held on 4 December 2004. The incumbent president, Nursultan Nazarbayev of Otan, defeated his main rival, Zharmakhan Tuyakbai of the For a Just Kazakhstan bloc.

Zhumabekov announced the preliminary results as "6,694,000 voters or 91.01 percent" for Nazarbayev and "445,047 or 6.64 percent" for Zharmakhan Tuyakbai. According to Zhumabekov, "On the basis of the results of voter turnout and the first results of the vote count, we can conclude that the presidential election in the Republic of Kazakhstan is valid. That is why I have all grounds to congratulate the people of Kazakhstan on electing Nursultan Abishuly Nazarbayev the president of the Republic of Kazakhstan."

== See also ==
- Government of Kazakhstan
