= Vera Sidorova =

Kazakh politician (1934–2025)

- Вера Сидорова

Chairwoman of the Presidium of the Supreme Soviet of the Kazakh SSR
- In office 6 December 1988 – 10 March 1989
- Preceded by: Zakash Kamalidenov
- Succeeded by: Mahtai Sagdiev

Personal details
- Born: Vera Vasilyevna Lazukina; 15 August 1934 Verkhnyaya Tishanka, Talovsky District, Voronezh Oblast, Russian SFSR, USSR
- Died: 9 April 2025 (aged 90)
- Party: CPSU
- Education: Kazan Agricultural Institute
- Occupation: Agronomist

Vera Vasilyevna Sidorova (Russian: Вера Васильевна Сидорова; 15 August 1934 – 9 April 2025) was a Soviet politician. A member of the Communist Party of the Soviet Union, she served as chairwoman of the Presidium of the Supreme Soviet of the Kazakh SSR from 1988 to 1989.

Sidorova died on 9 April 2025, at the age of 90.
