= 1994 Kazakh legislative election =

- 7 March 1994
- All 177 seats in the Supreme Council of Kazakhstan; 89 seats needed for a majority
- Turnout: 73.5%
Party	Leader	Seats	+/–
PUKU	Quanysh Sultanov	33	New
FTUK	Siyazbek Mukashev	11	New
PCK	Olzhas Suleimenov	9	New
SPK	Ibrahim Tajiyev	8	New
PUK		4	New
SMH		4	New
DCHR		1	New
UKY		1	New
Independents	–	64	+46
This lists parties that won seats. See the complete results below.
Chairman of the Supreme Council before	Chairman of the Supreme Council after
Serikbolsyn Abdildin; Communist Party of Kazakhstan	Abish Kekilbayev; Independent

Legislative elections were held in Kazakhstan on 7 March 1994, alongside local elections. The People's Union of Kazakhstan Unity emerged as the largest party with 33 of the 177 seats in the Supreme Council of Kazakhstan, although 64 independents were also elected. Supporters of the President won a clear majority of seats, and around 60% of seats were won by ethnic Kazakhs. Following the elections, Sergey Tereshchenko was reappointed Prime Minister. Voter turnout was 73.5%.

== Background ==
The elections were the first to the Supreme Kenges created by the 1993 constitution; elections for the former 360-seat Supreme Soviet had last taken place in March 1990, prior to independence in December 1991. The outgoing Supreme Soviet dissolved itself on 13 December 1993, five days after having set the election date.

== Campaign ==
The President's People's Union of Kazakhstan Unity was challenged by several newly formed groups, especially the People's Congress of Kazakhstan. After a screening process, 754 candidates were approved to contest the 135 single-member constituencies. There were also 65 candidates for the 42 "state list" seats.

The campaign lasted two-months and was focussed on the economy; Nazarbayev committed to the free-market system and continuing reforms, particularly in the banking and tax spheres, in order to attract foreign investment.

== Conduct ==
The elections were monitored by foreign observers, including the CSCE. The CSCE report called into question whether the elections had been free and fair.

== Results ==
Party	Votes	%	Seats	+/–
People's Union of Kazakhstan Unity			33	New
Federation of Trade Unions of Kazakhstan			11	New
People's Congress of Kazakhstan			9	New
Socialist Party of Kazakhstan			8	New
Peasants Union of Kazakhstan			4	New
Social Movement "Harmony"			4	New
Democratic Committee of Human Rights			1	New
Union of Kazakhstan's Youth			1	New
Communist Party of Kazakhstan			0	New
Independents			64	+46
State list			42	New
Total			177	–183
Valid votes	7,017,457	99.82		
Invalid/blank votes	12,593	0.18		
Total votes	7,030,050	100.00		
Registered voters/turnout	9,561,534	73.52		
Source: Nohlen et al.
