= President of Kazakhstan =

Head of state

President of the Republic of Kazakhstan
- Қазақстан Республикасының Президенті (Kazakh); Президент Республики Казахстан (Russian)
- Presidential standard

- Incumbent; Kassym-Jomart Tokayev since 12 June 2019
- Presidential Administration of Kazakhstan
- Style: Mr. President (informal); His Excellency (diplomatic)
- Type: Head of state Commander-in-chief
- Residence: Ak Orda Presidential Palace
- Appointer: Direct popular vote
- Term length: Seven years, non renewable
- Constituting instrument: Constitution of Kazakhstan (1990)
- Inaugural holder: Nursultan Nazarbayev
- Formation: 24 April 1990; 36 years ago (Kazakh SSR); 16 December 1991; 34 years ago (Republic)
- Deputy: Vice President; (2026–present; until 1996); Chairman of the Senate; (1996–2026)
- Salary: ₸7,876,032.18
- Website: (in Kazakh) akorda.kz (in English) akorda.kz

The president of Kazakhstan, officially the president of the Republic of Kazakhstan, (Note: Kazakh: Қазақстан Республикасының Президенті, romanized: Qazaqstan Respublikasynyñ Prezidentı; Russian: Президент Республики Казахстан, romanized: Prezident Respubliki Kazakhstan) is the executive head of state of Kazakhstan and the commander-in-chief of the Armed Forces of the Republic of Kazakhstan. As the highest-ranking official in the country, the president also chairs the National Security Council with the powers and responsibilities of the office as outlined in a special section of the Constitution of Kazakhstan.

The office of the president was established in 1990, a year before the dissolution of the Soviet Union, with Nursultan Nazarbayev becoming the first president. Nazarbayev served in office for nearly three decades until his resignation in March 2019. Following his resignation, Kassym-Jomart Tokayev, assumed the acting presidency on 20 March 2019, who was then elected in the June 2019 presidential election.

The presidential residence is located in Akorda Residence, the official residence and workplace of the president. Under the Constitution, the president holds substantial authority over Kazakhstan's domestic and foreign policies. The president is responsible for appointing key government officials, including the prime minister and ministers. The president also plays a crucial role in national security and foreign relations, with the authority to declare a state of emergency if necessary. Additionally, the president can issue decrees and supervise the implementation of laws passed by the parliament.

If the president is unable to fulfill their duties, the powers of the presidency are temporarily transferred to the vice president of Kazakhstan, who becomes the acting president until a new president is directly elected.

Presidential elections in Kazakhstan have faced criticism, with concerns raised by Western observers regarding ballot tampering, voter fraud, harassment of opposition candidates, and media restrictions. The president is elected directly by the people of Kazakhstan for a seven-year term.

== Selection process ==
According to Article 41 of the Constitution, an eligible presidential candidate must be a citizen of Kazakhstan who is at least 40 years old and has a perfect command of the Kazakh language and has lived in Kazakhstan for not less than 15 years. The election day shall be held on the first Sunday of December and shall not coincide with the election of a new Parliament. The constitution limits the number of terms a president can serve to just one term.

The candidate who receives more than 50 percent of the votes of the constituents that took part in the election shall be deemed elected. If none of the candidates receives the above number of votes, a second round of elections shall be held between the two candidates who obtained the largest number of votes. The candidate who receives the larger number of votes of the constituents who take part in the second round of elections shall be deemed elected as the new president.

== Symbols ==
The president of Kazakhstan's decorations include a breast mark and a presidential standard.

=== Presidential standard ===
The standard of the president of Kazakhstan is similar to the national flag in that it is rectangular in shape with a ratio of 1:2. In the center of the standard is the emblem of Kazakhstan. It is bordered on three sides with golden fringe.

Presidential Standard (1995–2012)

The current presidential standard has been in service as recently as 2012. The former standard, which was used from 1995–2012, was a light blue rectangle there with a golden circle in which the figure of the young Kazakh leader Sakas riding a snow leopard.

=== Order of the Golden Eagle ===
The Order of the Golden Eagle (Kazakh: Алтын Қыран ордені or Altyn Qyran Order) is the highest civilian award that can be awarded by the president of Kazakhstan. Its purpose is to recognize outstanding service to the country by Kazakh and foreign citizens. As head of state, the president of Kazakhstan receives the special model of the Order of the Golden Eagle, and is thus a commander of that order ex officio.

== President in the Constitution ==
Item 5 of Article 42 of the Constitution determines that no one can be elected president more than two terms in a row, but it also states that "The present restriction shall not extend on the First President of the Republic of Kazakhstan."

Article 46 says that the president's "honor and dignity shall be inviolable" and that his expenses shall be paid by the state. Item 4 of the article outlines the special status and authority of the first president, and refers to a special constitutional act for definitions. According to this act, the first president possesses total, absolute and termless immunity for all actions he performs while in office, and that he remains a government official until his death. He also retains the ability to speak to the people of Kazakhstan, keeps guards, communication, transport, and state support of his activity, and that his official apartment and summer residence became his property with official maintenance. He is also provided with medical care, sanatorium, pensions and insurance.

On April 26, 2015, Nursultan Nazarbayev was re-elected for his 5th presidential term. The official ceremony of the inauguration took place at the Palace of Independence in Nur-Sultan on April 29. At the inauguration ceremony the re-elected president assured the nation that he would continue the 5 institutional reforms that he had offered earlier, which would contribute to the consistent growth and development of the country.

On January 25, 2017, President Nursultan Nazarbayev laid the groundwork for reforms to the constitution that would redistribute executive powers to the parliament and ministries for the purpose of more open and efficient governance.

== Presidential Administration ==
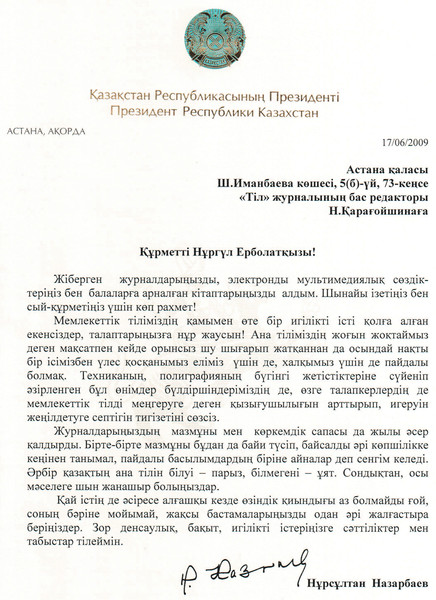
An official document of the presidency.

The Presidential Administration of the Republic of Kazakhstan (Kazakh: Қазақстан Республикасы Президентінің Әкімшілігі, Qazaqstan Respublikasy Prezidentınıñ Äkımşılıgı; Russian: Администрация Президента Республики Казахстан) reports directly to the president and aids him/her in their everyday dates. It was established in accordance of Presidential Decree No. 2565 on October 20, 1995. It is currently based at the Ak Orda Presidential Palace in the capital city of Astana. Prior to that, it was based in Almaty.

The Organization for Security and Co-operation in Europe (OSCE) and other international monitors criticised the election as unfair, with issues noted including the closure of media outlets critical of the government and the jailing of opposition activists. OSCE spokesperson Cornelia Jonker criticised the lack of a "genuine choice" for voters and also argued that there were "significant restrictions to the freedom of expression."

The date of Kazakhstan's fifth presidential election is June 9, 2019. It is the first election since the resignation of the first president of Kazakhstan, Nursultan Nazarbayev.

== See also ==
- List of leaders of Kazakhstan
- Acting President of Kazakhstan
- Prime Minister of Kazakhstan
- Vice President of Kazakhstan
