= Matay =

- Village
- Location in Kazakhstan
- Coordinates: 45°53′42″N 78°43′05″E
- Country: Kazakhstan
- Region: Jetisu Region
- Time zone: UTC+6 (Omsk Time)

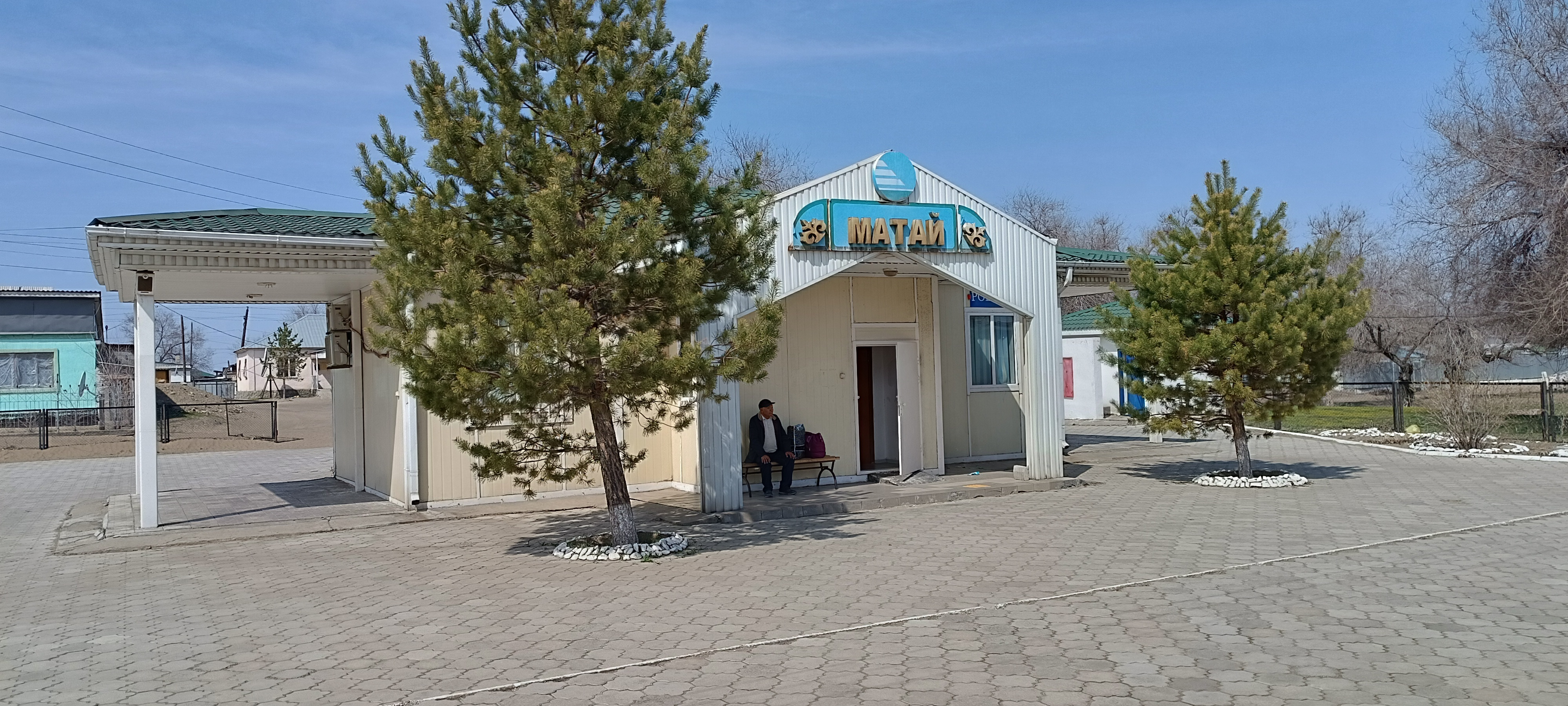
Matay train station, Kazakhstan

Matay is a village in Jetisu Region, in south-eastern Kazakhstan.

== Climate ==
Matay has a steppe climate (Köppen: BSk), with hot summers and very cold winters.

Climate data for Matay (1991–2020)
Month	Jan	Feb	Mar	Apr	May	Jun	Jul	Aug	Sep	Oct	Nov	Dec	Year
Mean daily maximum °C (°F)	−6.7 (19.9)	−3.3 (26.1)	6.9 (44.4)	19.7 (67.5)	26.1 (79.0)	31.8 (89.2)	33.4 (92.1)	32.1 (89.8)	25.7 (78.3)	17.1 (62.8)	5.6 (42.1)	−3.3 (26.1)	15.4 (59.7)
Daily mean °C (°F)	−12.5 (9.5)	−9.3 (15.3)	0.3 (32.5)	11.7 (53.1)	18.0 (64.4)	23.8 (74.8)	25.6 (78.1)	23.8 (74.8)	17.0 (62.6)	8.9 (48.0)	−0.6 (30.9)	−8.6 (16.5)	8.2 (46.8)
Mean daily minimum °C (°F)	−17.4 (0.7)	−14.4 (6.1)	−5.1 (22.8)	4.2 (39.6)	9.8 (49.6)	15.6 (60.1)	17.7 (63.9)	15.3 (59.5)	8.8 (47.8)	2.0 (35.6)	−5.4 (22.3)	−12.9 (8.8)	1.5 (34.7)
Average precipitation mm (inches)	19.6 (0.77)	16.3 (0.64)	18.8 (0.74)	21.3 (0.84)	23.3 (0.92)	21.7 (0.85)	28.1 (1.11)	11.4 (0.45)	10.7 (0.42)	20.6 (0.81)	28.4 (1.12)	23.0 (0.91)	243.2 (9.57)
Average precipitation days (≥ 1.0 mm)	5.5	4.5	4.9	4.3	4.8	4.4	4.5	2.7	2.3	3.9	5.5	5.4	52.7
Source: NOAA
