= Egemen Qazaqstan =

- Owner: Government of Kazakhstan
- Founded: 1919
- Language: Kazakh language
- Website: www.egemen.kz

Egemen Qazaqstan (Kazakh: Егемен Қазақстан, [jeɡʲeˈmʲen qɑzɑqˈstɑn], Sovereign Kazakhstan) is a government-owned Kazakh language newspaper published from Kazakhstan. It was first published on 17 December 1919. The newspaper was started by the Ministry of Information and Public Accord.

== History ==
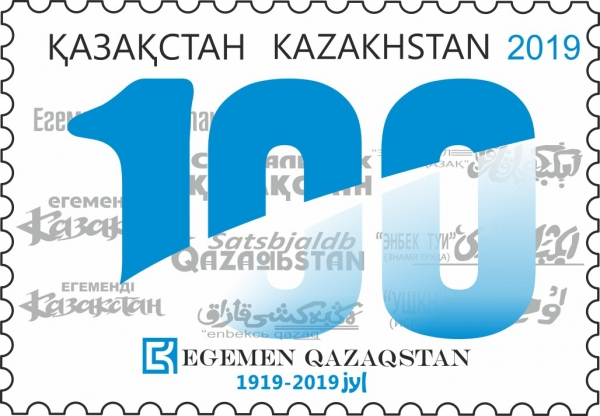
A 2019 stamp dedicated to the 100th anniversary of the newspaper

The history of "Egemen Qazaqstan" begins with the publication of the newspaper "Ұшқын" ("Spark") on December 17, 1919, in the city of Orenburg. Later the name of the newspaper was repeatedly changed. The publication was issued under the names: "Enbek tuy" ("Banner of Labor") in 1920, "Enbekshi qazaq" ("Kazakh Worker") in 1921, "Sotsialdy Qazaqstan" ("Social Kazakhstan") in 1932. And in 1937 the newspaper was renamed "Sotsialistik Qazaqstan" ("Socialist Kazakhstan"), and under this name it was published for 54 years.

"Egemendi" was a new word, just coming into common usage and marking the advent of a new era. On January 1, 1993, after a wide discussion, at the suggestion of the newspaper's editor-in-chief Abish Kekilbayev, the ending "-di" was removed from the first word of the title, and the name of the newspaper changed to "Egemen Qazaqstan". On March 20, 2018, the Latin name was used instead of the Cyrillic name on the cover of the newspaper.

== See also ==
- Mass media in Kazakhstan
