= Serikbolsyn Abdildin =

Soviet-Kazakh politician and economist (1937–2019)

- Серікболсын Әбділдин
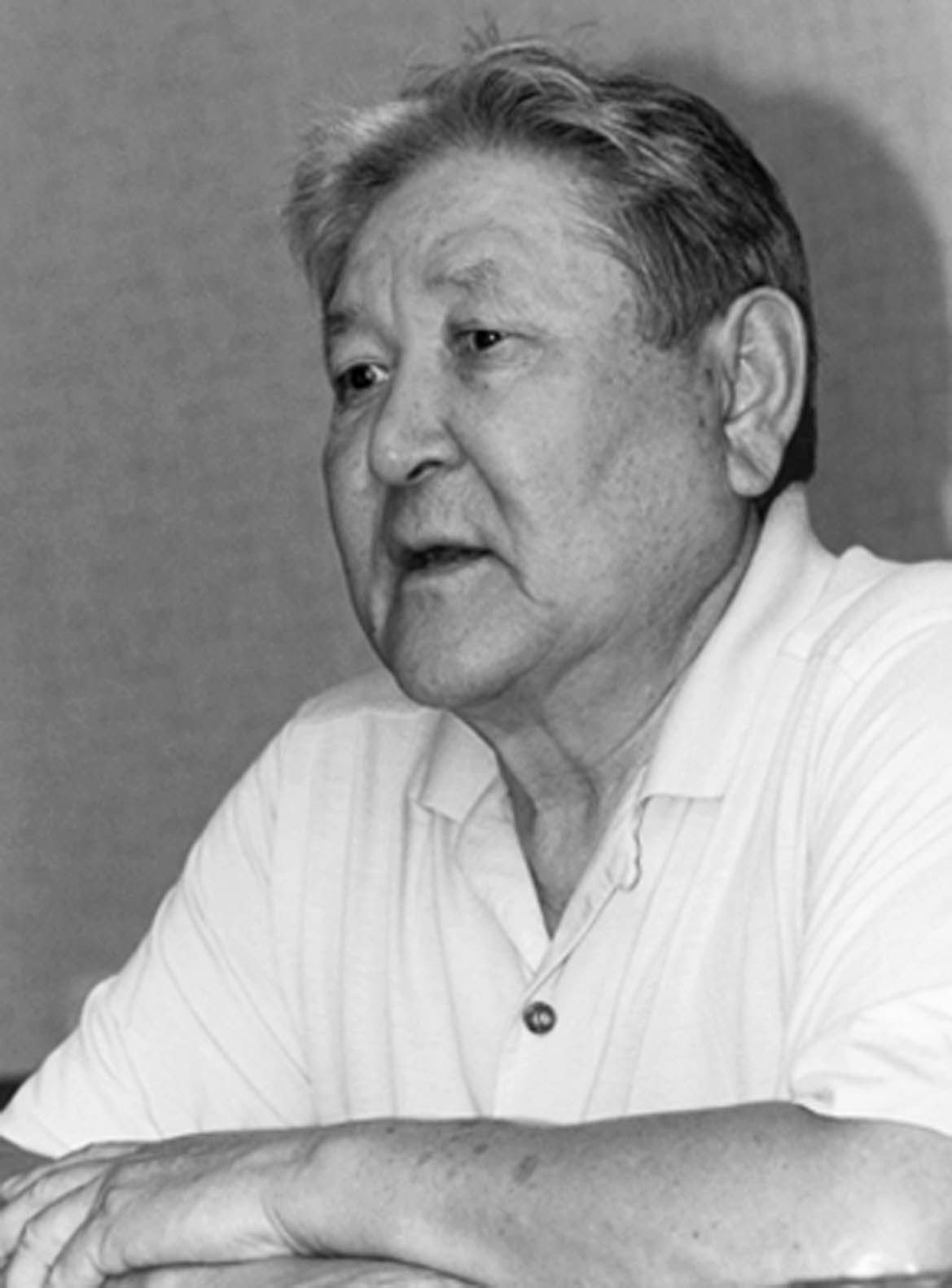
- Abdildin in 2005

Chairman of the Supreme Council of Kazakhstan
- In office 28 January 1993 – 13 December 1993
- Preceded by: Office established
- Succeeded by: Abish Kekilbayev

Chairman of the Supreme Soviet of Kazakhstan
- In office 16 October 1991 – 28 January 1993
- Preceded by: Yerik Asanbayev
- Succeeded by: Office abolished

Member of Mazhilis
- In office 10 October 1999 – 19 September 2004

First Secretary of the Communist Party
- In office April 1996 – 17 April 2010
- Preceded by: Baidabek Tolepbayev
- Succeeded by: Gaziz Aldamjarov

Personal details
- Born: 25 November 1937 Qyzylkesek, Kazakh SSR, Soviet Union
- Died: 31 December 2019 (aged 82) Almaty, Kazakhstan
- Party: Communist Party
- Occupation: Politician, economist

Serikbolsyn Abdildaevich Abdildin (Kazakh: Серікболсын Әбділдаұлы Әбділдин, Serıkbolsyn Äbdıldaūly Äbdıldin, [sʲerɘkˈboɫsɤn æbdɘlˌdɑʊˈɫɤ æbdɘlˈdɪn]; 25 November 1937 – 31 December 2019) was a Kazakh economist, politician, First Secretary of the Communist Party from 1996 to 2010, member of the Mazhilis from 1999 to 2004 and a candidate in the 1999 presidential election. He is often described as the "patriarch" for the formation of parliamentarism and the first-drafted Kazakh Constitution in early years of independence. As a Communist, Abdildin was a vivid supporter for democracy and has called for reforms for a multi-party system with a rule of law.

Äbdildin began his career as an agriculturist until becoming involved in politics from serving in Soviet state bodies in Kazakhstan to eventually becoming the head of the Supreme Soviet of the Kazakh SSR where he was involved in the drafting of the new post-independent Constitution. After the dissolution of the legislature, he joined the opposition amidst President Nursultan Nazarbayev's increase of executive powers by leading the Communist Party of Kazakhstan and has worked in various organisations and movements aiming at reforming Kazakhstan's political system into a democratic form of governance, until retiring from politics in 2010.

He continued scientific and teaching activities until he died in late 2019, at the age of 82.

== Early life and career ==
Serikbolsyn Äbdildin was born in 1937 in the village of Qyzylkesek in eastern Kazakhstan. His father, Äbilda Älimjanov, died in combat during World War II in 1943 when Abdildin was only six years old. He studied at the Veterinary Institute in Alma-Ata, where he graduated in 1960.

After graduating, he initially worked for three years in a farm in the Semipalatinsk Oblast. From 1963, Abdildin attended the graduate school at the Veterinary Institute in Alma-Ata and between 1966 and 1967, he was employed there as a research assistant. He then worked in various positions at the State Planning Commission of the Kazakh SSR.

== Political career ==
In 1982, he was appointed the First Deputy Minister of Agriculture of the Kazakh SSR and in December 1985, he became the first deputy chairman of the State Agricultural Committee of the Kazakh SSR. Äbdildin held this position until July 1987, before becoming a permanent representative of the Kazakh Soviet Republic at the Council of Ministers of the Soviet Union. From April 1990, he was deputy chairman of the Supreme Soviet of the Kazakh SSR and then from 16 October 1991, as a Chairman of the Supreme Soviet which later became the Supreme Council of Kazakhstan in January 1993.

After Kazakhstan gained its independence, the associated loss of power of the Communist Party of Kazakhstan and the abolition of the 12th Convocation of the Supreme Council by President Nursultan Nazarbayev, Äbdildin went into opposition in 1994. He was described as "tough" towards authorities but refused to confront despite having big support in fear of "causing instability". That same year, he became the chairman of the Republic Coordinating Council of Public Associations. In April 1996, Äbdildin became the First Secretary of the Communist Party.

=== 1999 presidential campaign ===
Äbdildin announced his bid for presidency on 11 October 1998. He criticized President Nursultan Nazarbayev over his free market policies to which he blamed for economic crisis in the country and proposed for Kazakhstan to instead implement a mixed-economic system. Äbdildin also advocated for more spending in health care and education. In regards to fair election, he proposed for each candidate to have a representative in the election commission. However, his ideas were ignored by authorities. Äbdildin took 2nd place in the race and won around 12% of the vote. He condemned the results, claiming to garner "as many votes as Nazarbayev did."

=== Member of the Mazhilis (1999–2004) ===
Äbdildin was elected as one of the three Communist Party MPs in the Mazhilis after the 1999 Kazakh legislative election. From there, he was a member of the Committee on Foreign Affairs, Defense and Security. That same year, he became the co-chair of the Forum of Democratic Forces of Kazakhstan.

From 2002 to 2003, he was member of the Political Council of the Democratic Choice of Kazakhstan (QDT). In April 2004, the Communist Party of Kazakhstan (QKP) became split after the internal disputes with the faction led by Vladislav Kosarev who went on to establish the Communist People's Party of Kazakhstan (QKHP). The QKHP members blamed Äbdildin of splitting the party and accused him of working for the CIA by attempting to start a colour revolution in the country. The move was seen to be made by Nazarbayev's regime in order to weaken Äbdildin's party. That same year, Äbdildin became a member of the Coordination Council of the Democratic Forces of Kazakhstan.

Shortly before the 2004 legislative elections, the Kazakh government introduced the Sailau system of electronic voting. Äbdildin accused of the authorities in prepping to falsify the election results with the new system. The QKP formed a political bloc with the QDT and participated in the election. The bloc failed to win any seats in the Mazhilis, thus ending Äbdildin's MP term.

=== Post-Parliamentarian career ===
On 2 November 2004, Äbdildin became a member of the National Commission on Democracy and Civil Society, created as an advisory body under the President of Kazakhstan. On 20 March 2005, a political bloc For a Just Kazakhstan (ÄQÜ) was founded where Äbdildin spoke at the session. From there, he was a member of the Presidium of the Council of ÄQÜ.

On 20 March 2006, after the dissolution of the National Commission on Democracy and Civil Society, a State Commission was established to develop and concertize the program of democratic reforms in the Republic of Kazakhstan, of which Abdildin became a member of.

On 17 April 2010, a plenum of the Central Committee and the Central Control Commission of the Communist Party of Kazakhstan was held, where Äbdildin resigned from the post as the First Secretary, saying that "everything has a limit and you can't always hold on to one position or chair."

== Later life and death ==
After retiring from politics in 2010, Äbdildin continued in criticizing Nursultan Nazarbayev.

In response to the ban of the Communist Party of Kazakhstan in September 2015, he believed that the move was made by authorities to prevent its interference in the country's elections and not because of the party's ideology. In his last interview in June 2019, Äbdildin said that Nazarbayev should've resigned from presidency long ago and that his successor Kassym-Jomart Tokayev offers nothing in change of the country's leadership but is "more trustable" than his predecessor. He also suggested for a return to a 1993 Kazakh Constitution. He made his last public appearance at the Kurultai on 7 September 2019, saying the country should "get rid of Nazarbayev" to which he received applause from the audience.

Äbdildin died around the midnight during the New Year's Eve on 31 December 2019 in Almaty, at the age of 82. A funeral was held in front of the Jambyl Kazakh State Philharmonic building on 3 January 2020 which was attended by human rights activists, opposition politicians, and the city administration representatives. He is buried at the Kensai-2 cemetery in the hills of Almaty.
