= Azat Civil Movement of Kazakhstan =

Kazakhstan political party

- Abbreviation: AQAQ
- Leader: Hasen Qojahmetov
- Founded: 30 June–1 July 1990; 20 November 1992
- Headquarters: Almaty
- Ideology: Kazakh nationalism National conservatism

The Azat Civil Movement of Kazakhstan is an unregistered political party in Kazakhstan. It was founded between 30 June and 1 July 1990 and is currently led by Kazakh composer, political activist Hasen Qojahmetov. It was periodically merged into Azat Republican Party of Kazakhstan from 11 October 1992 to 20 November 1992 in an attempt for reunification with the party which was split on 5 September 1991 due to a disagreement in assessing the political and economic course of the country's leadership.
