= 1990 Kazakh Supreme Soviet election =

- 25 March 1990
- Turnout: 83.97%
Party	Leader	Seats
Communist Party	Nursultan Nazarbayev	342
Independents	–	18
This lists parties that won seats. See the complete results below.

Supreme Soviet elections were held in Kazakhstan on 25 March 1990. Of the 360 seats, 270 were directly elected, whilst 90 were selected by public associations. The Communist Party of Kazakhstan won 342 of the 360 seats, with the remainder going to independents. Voter turnout was reported to be 84%.

== Results ==
Party	Votes	%	Seats
Communist Party of Kazakhstan			342
Independents			18
Total			360
Total votes	8,177,059	–	
Registered voters/turnout	9,738,548	83.97	
Source: Nohlen et al.
