= Supreme Council of Kazakhstan =

1993–1995 unicameral legislative branch in Kazakhstan

Supreme Council of Kazakhstan: Қазақстан Жоғарғы Кеңесі (Kazakh); Верховный Совет Казахстана (Russian)
- Emblem of Kazakhstan (1992–2014)

Type
- Type: Unicameral

History
- Established: 28 January 1993
- Disbanded: 11 March 1995
- Preceded by: Supreme Soviet of the Kazakh SSR
- Succeeded by: Parliament of Kazakhstan

Leadership
- Chairman: Serikbolsyn Abdildin (first)
- Abish Kekilbayev (last)

Elections
- Voting system: Plurality voting
- Last election: 7 March 1994

Meeting place
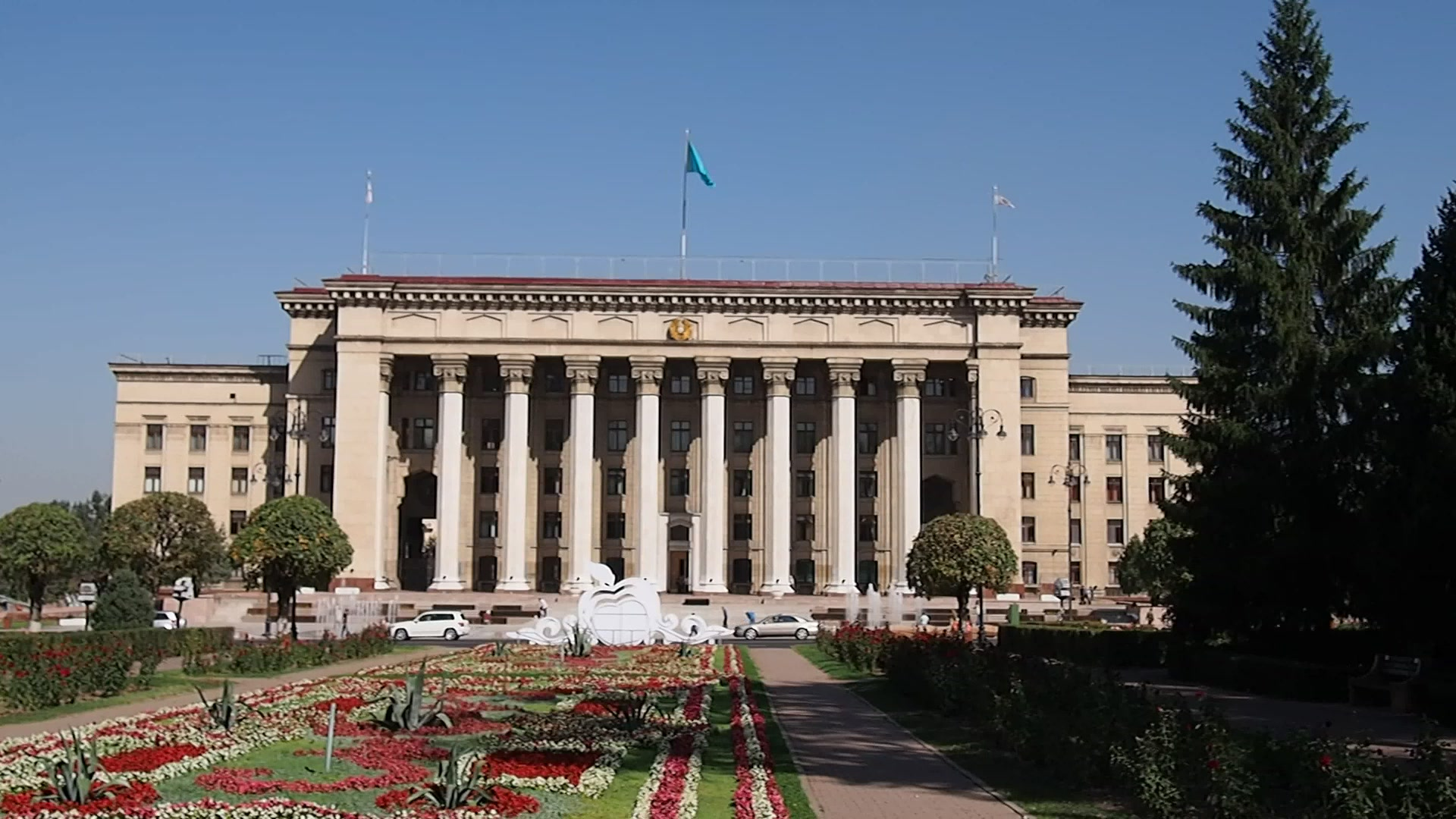
- Parliament House, Almaty

The Supreme Council of the Republic of Kazakhstan (Note: Kazakh: Қазақстан Республикасының Жоғарғы Кеңесі; Qazaqstan Respublikasynyñ Joğarğy Keñesı; Russian: Верховный Совет Республики Казахстан; Verkhovny Sovet Respubliki Kazakhstan) was the unicameral legislature of Kazakhstan that existed from 1993 to 1995. The Supreme Council succeeded the Supreme Soviet of the Kazakh SSR after the new Constitution of Kazakhstan was adopted on 28 January 1993. During this period, the Supreme Council had its members elected in the 1994 Kazakh legislative election which was held for the first time in post-Soviet Kazakhstan. It existed to function until its dissolution on 11 March 1995 by a Presidential Decree after the Constitutional Court of Kazakhstan ruled in the favor Kazakhstani journalist Tatyana Kvyatkovskaya to nullify the results of the 1994 legislative election which she accused of being fraudulent. The Supreme Council was eventually replaced by the Parliament of Kazakhstan in 1996 which was established after the 1995 Kazakh constitutional referendum.

== List of chairmen ==
=== Chairmen of the Supreme Council ===
- Serikbolsyn Abdildin (January 28, 1993 – December 13, 1993)
- Abish Kekilbayev (1994 – March 11, 1995)

== Convocations ==
- 12th convocation (1990–1993)
- 13th convocation (1994–1995)
