= Supreme Soviet of the Kazakh Soviet Socialist Republic =

Government agency of Soviet-era Kazakhstan

Supreme Soviet of the Kazakh SSR Верховный Совет Казахской ССР Қазақ ССР Жоғарғы Советі
- Kazakh SSR (1937–1991); Kazakhstan (1991–1993)
- Coat of arms of the Kazakh Soviet Socialist Republic

Type
- Type: Supreme Soviet

History
- Established: 1937
- Disbanded: 28 January 1993
- Succeeded by: Supreme Council of Kazakhstan

Leadership
- Chairmen of the Presidium: Mahtay Sagdiev (last)
- Chairmen of the Supreme Soviet: Serikbolsyn Abdildin (last)

Elections
- Last election: 1990

Meeting place
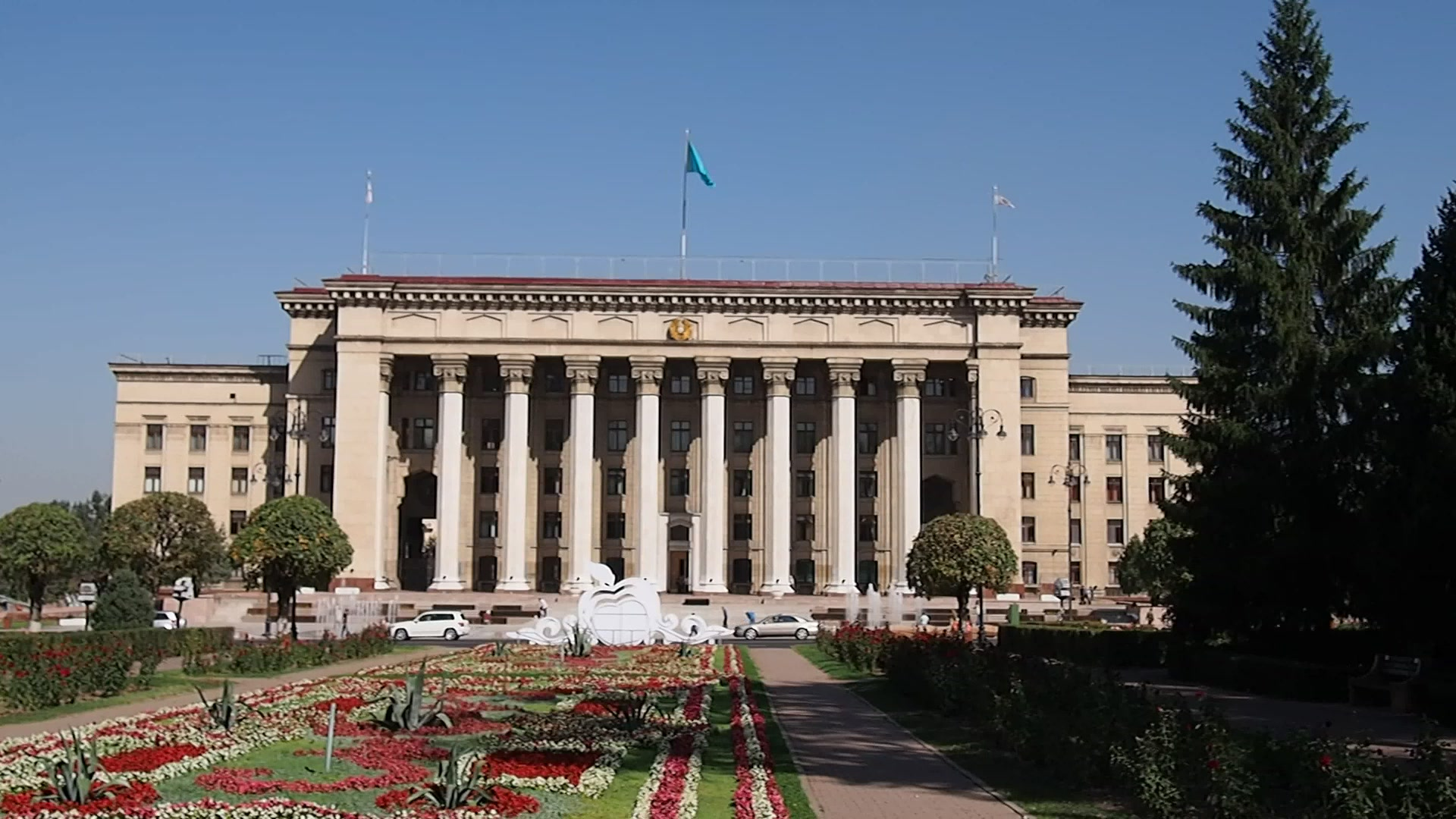
- Supreme Soviet Building, Alma-Ata

The Supreme Soviet of the Kazakh SSR (Kazakh: Қазақ ССР Жоғарғы Советі, romanized: Qazaq SSR Joğarğy Sovetı; Russian: Верховный Совет Казахской ССР), also known as the Supreme Council, was a supreme organ of republican power of Kazakhstan, then known as the Kazakh SSR, one of the republics comprising the Soviet Union. The Supreme Soviet was the only government branch in the republic and, under the principle of unified power, all organs were subservient to it.

The Soviet had very little power and carried out orders given by the Communist Party of Kazakhstan (CPK).

== Chairman ==
=== Chairmen of the Presidium of the Supreme Soviet of the Kazakh SSR ===
The office Chairmen of the Presidium of the Supreme Soviet is the de facto head of state of the Kazakh SSR.

- Abdisamet Kazakpaev (July 17, 1938 – January 1947)
- Ivan Lukyanets (January 1947 – March 20, 1947)
- Daniyal Kerimbaev (March 20, 1947 – January 23, 1954)
- Nurtas Undasynov (January 23, 1954 – April 19, 1955)
- Zhumabek Tashenev (April 19, 1955 – January 20, 1960)
- Fazyl Karibzhanov (January 20, 1960 – August 25, 1960)
- Kapitolina Kryukova (August 25, 1960 – January 3, 1961)
- Isagali Sharipov (January 3, 1961 – April 5, 1965)
- Sabir Niyazbekov (April 5, 1965 – December 20, 1978)
- Isatai Abdukarimov (December 20, 1978 – December 14, 1979)
- Sattar Imashev (December 14, 1979 – February 22, 1984)
- Andrei Plotnikov (February 22, 1984 – March 22, 1984)
- Bayken Ashimov (March 22, 1984 – September 27, 1985)
- Salamat Mukashev (September 27, 1985 – February 9, 1988)
- Zakash Kamalidenov (February 9, 1988 – December 1988)
- Vera Sidorova (December 1988 – March 10, 1989)
- Mahtay Sagdiev (March 10, 1989 – February 22, 1990)

=== Chairmen of the Supreme Soviet of the Kazakh SSR ===
- Kiylybay Medeubekov (December 13, 1979 – February 22, 1990)
- Nursultan Nazarbayev (February 22 – April 24, 1990)
- Yerik Asanbayev (April 24, 1990 – October 16, 1991)

=== Chairmen of the Supreme Soviet of Kazakhstan ===
- Serikbolsyn Abdildin (October 16, 1991 – January 28, 1993)

== Convocations ==
- 1st convocation (1938–1946)
- 2nd convocation (1947–1950)
- 3rd convocation (1951–1954)
- 4th convocation (1955–1959)
- 5th convocation (1959–1962)
- 6th convocation (1963–1966)
- 7th convocation (1967–1970)
- 8th convocation (1971–1974)
- 9th convocation (1975–1979)
- 10th convocation (1980–1984)
- 11th convocation (1985–1989)
- 12th convocation (1990–1993)
