= Jiguli Dairabaev 2022 presidential campaign =

Election campaign in Kazakhstan 2022

Jiguli Dairabaev for President 2022
- Campaign: 2022 Kazakh presidential election
- Candidate: Jiguli Dairabaev; Member of the Supreme Council (1993–1995); Member of the Supreme Soviet (1990–1993)
- Affiliation: AHDPP
- Status: Announced; 30 September 2022; Official nominee 30 September 2022; Lost election 21 November 2022
- Key people: Toleutai Raqymbekov (chief of staff)

Jiguli Dairabaev, the chairman of the Board "Association of Farmers of Kazakhstan" and the Committee of the Agro-Industrial Complex under the Presidium of "Atameken" National Chamber of Entrepreneurs, was nominated by the Auyl People's Democratic Patriotic Party for presidency on 30 September 2022. After submitting documents to the Central Election Commission (CEC) on 5 October 2022, Dairabaev went through a series of qualification procedures and was eventually registered as a candidate on 17 October for the 2022 presidential elections after collecting 125,081 signatures in support.

== Background ==
On 26 September 2022, the Auyl People's Democratic Patriotic Party (AHDPP) political council presidium held a meeting to which a decision was made in holding the party's 20th Extraordinary Congress following President Kassym-Jomart Tokayev's announcement of 2022 snap presidential elections.

=== Announcement and registration ===
The party congress took place on 30 September in Astana, where Jiguli Dairabaev's presidential nomination was voted in favour by 67 delegates with 2 opposed. Dairabaev in turn thanked AHDPP party members and pledged to put all efforts into the development of Kazakhstan along with the Agro-Industrial Complex.

Dairabaev on 5 October 2022 applied his candidacy paperwork to the Central Election Commission (CEC) and from there, went through a series of qualification processes beginning with the state language exam in Kazakh on 8 October, for which the overseeing linguistic commission deemed him as fluent in. After the CEC established compliancy of Dairabaev the following day on 9 October, he began collecting required signatures in support which ended up amount to total number of 125,081 signatures, with 119,975 being declared valid by the CEC and in result, officially registering Dairabaev as a third candidate in the presidential race on 17 October.

== Campaign ==
On 21 October 2022, the republican public headquarters in support of Dairabaev was launched, in which Dairabaev attending the opening himself presented his election programme. It was also announced that presidential campaign of Dairabaev would cover 88 cities, 30 villages and more than 6,000 settlements in Kazakhstan, and that Dairabaev's canvassing along with his representatives would take place door-to-door.

=== Structure ===
According to campaign headquarters chief of staff and former 2019 presidential candidate Toleutai Raqymbekov, its branches would operate in all 20 regions along with a total 222 of them organised in all 164 rural districts and 37 regional cities.

== Election program ==
Dairabaev unveiled his election programme on 21 October 2022 that would be aimed at creating "a new Kazakhstan based on the maximum implementation" of its "main national advantages" which were:

Steppe Democracy

- Adherement to the Constitution of Kazakhstan;
- Increasing wages of workers;
- Equal and fair distribution funding between central government and regions;
- Transparent budget planning process;
- Expanding political influence of mass media, opposition leaders, public figures, cultural, scientific and educational figures within the government;
- Neutrality in foreign politics.

High cultural values

- Restore the role of the institution of the family;
- Change in preschool and general education;
- Raising the status of the Kazakh language;
- Improvement and preservation of the national identity of the Kazakh diaspora as well as support for Oralmans;
- Promoting freedom of religion, interethnic harmony and friendship of peoples:

Rural development

- Revival of Agro-Industrial Complex and gentrification of villages;
- Presidential guarantees for agricultural producers and workers;
- Raising the status of agricultural workers for guaranteed social benefits;
- Creation and development of a network of consumer societies and cooperatives in urban areas;
- State stimulation of the activities by private investment funds.
