= 2023 Kazakh legislative election =

- 19 March 2023

All 98 seats in the Mäjilis 50 seats needed for a majority
- Registered: 12,035,578
- Turnout: 54.21% (▼9.04pp)
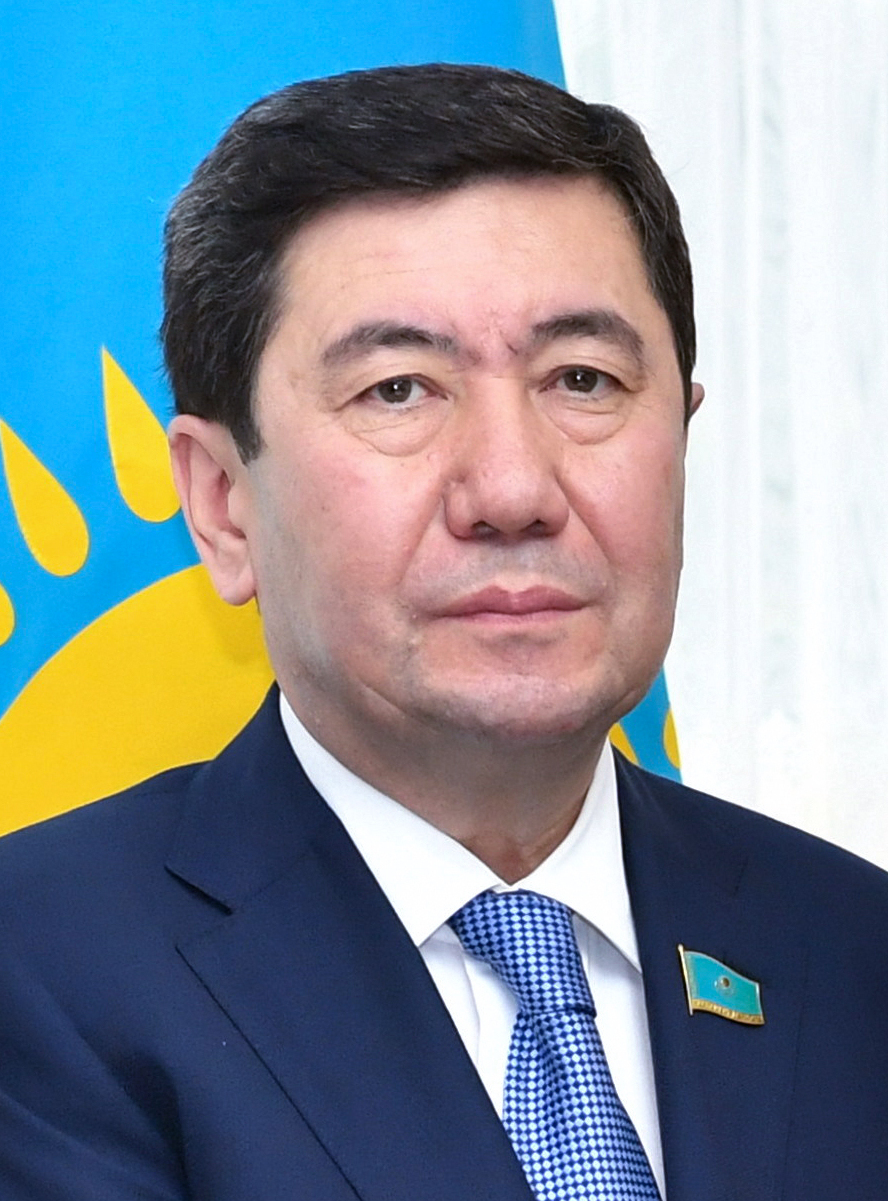

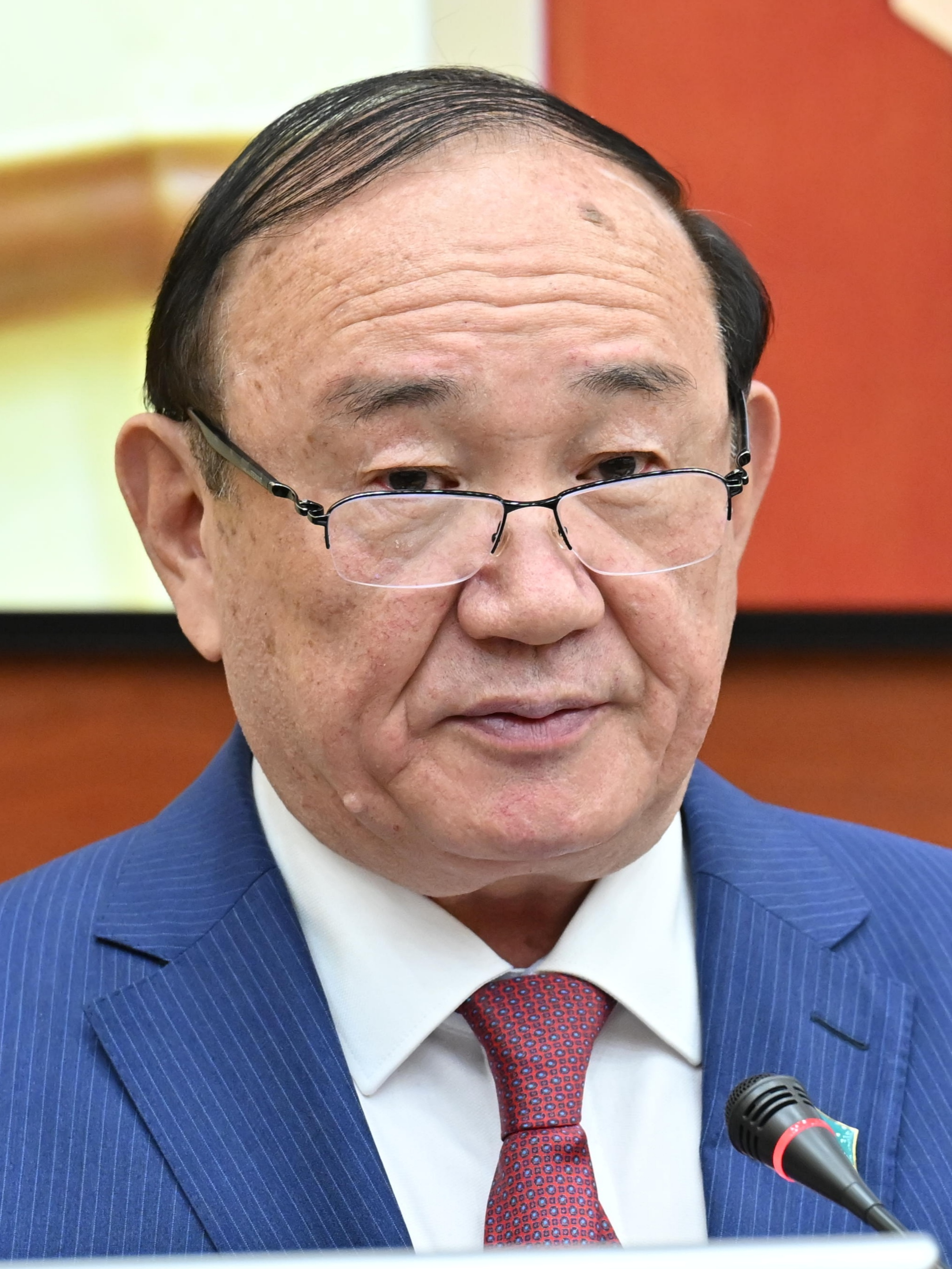

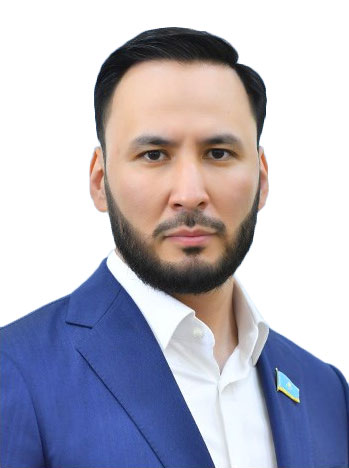

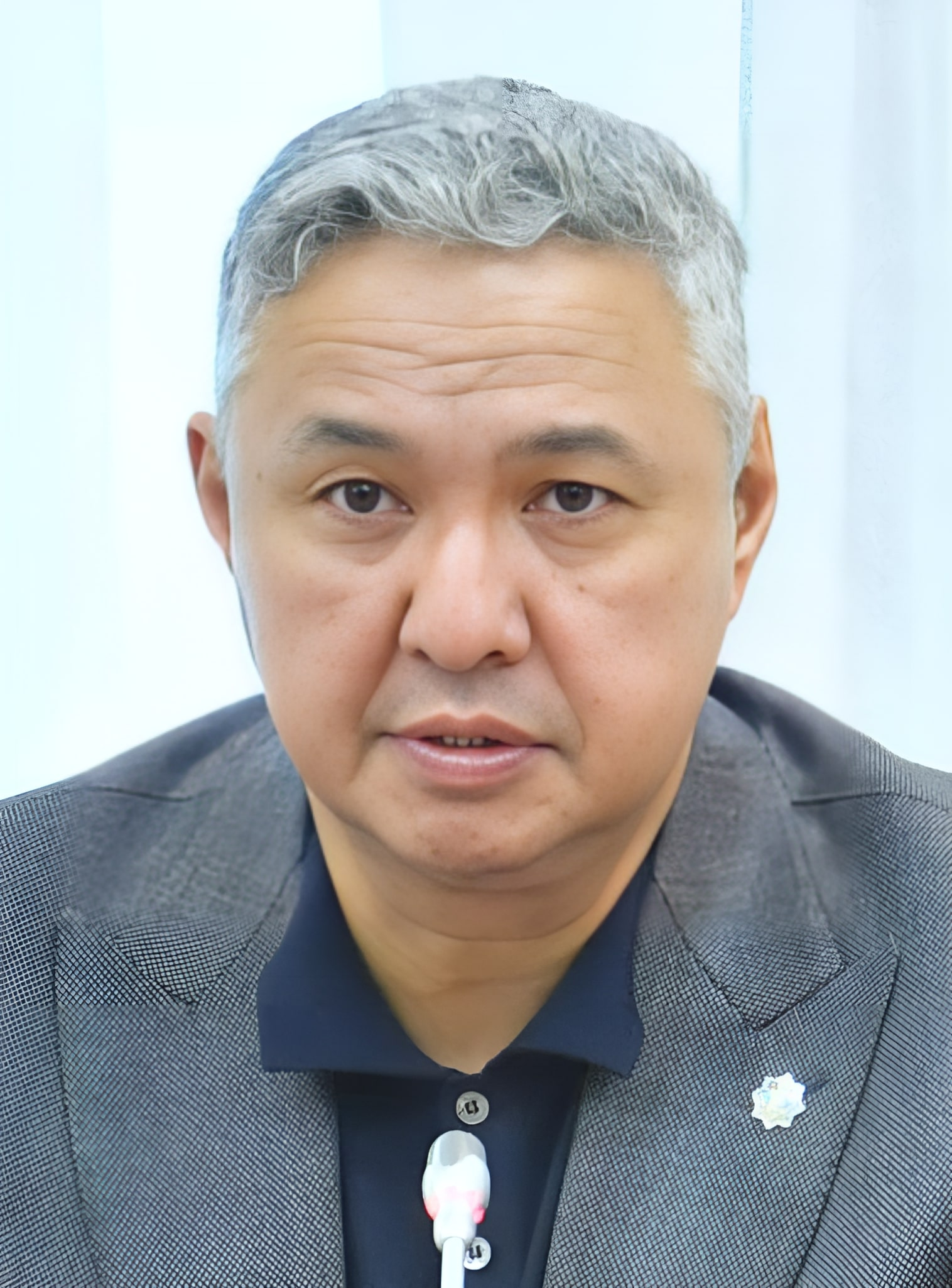

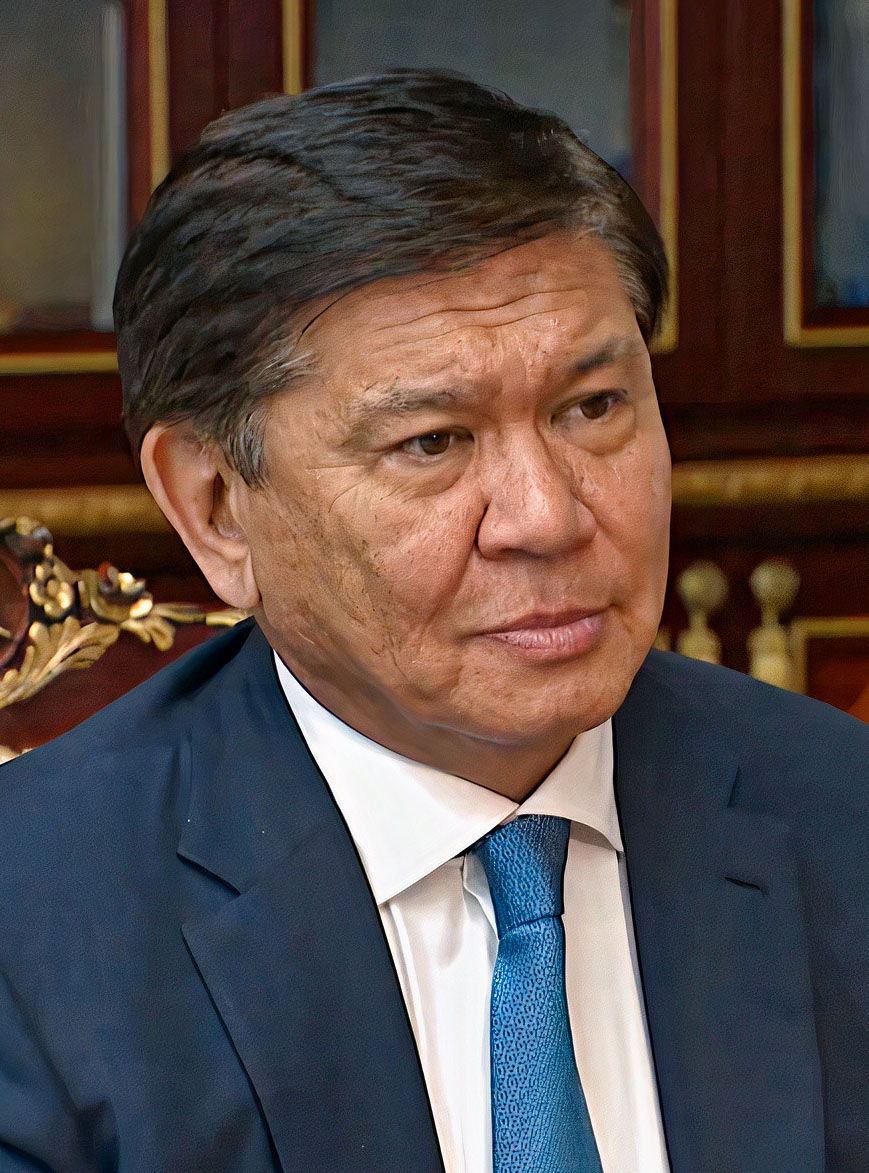

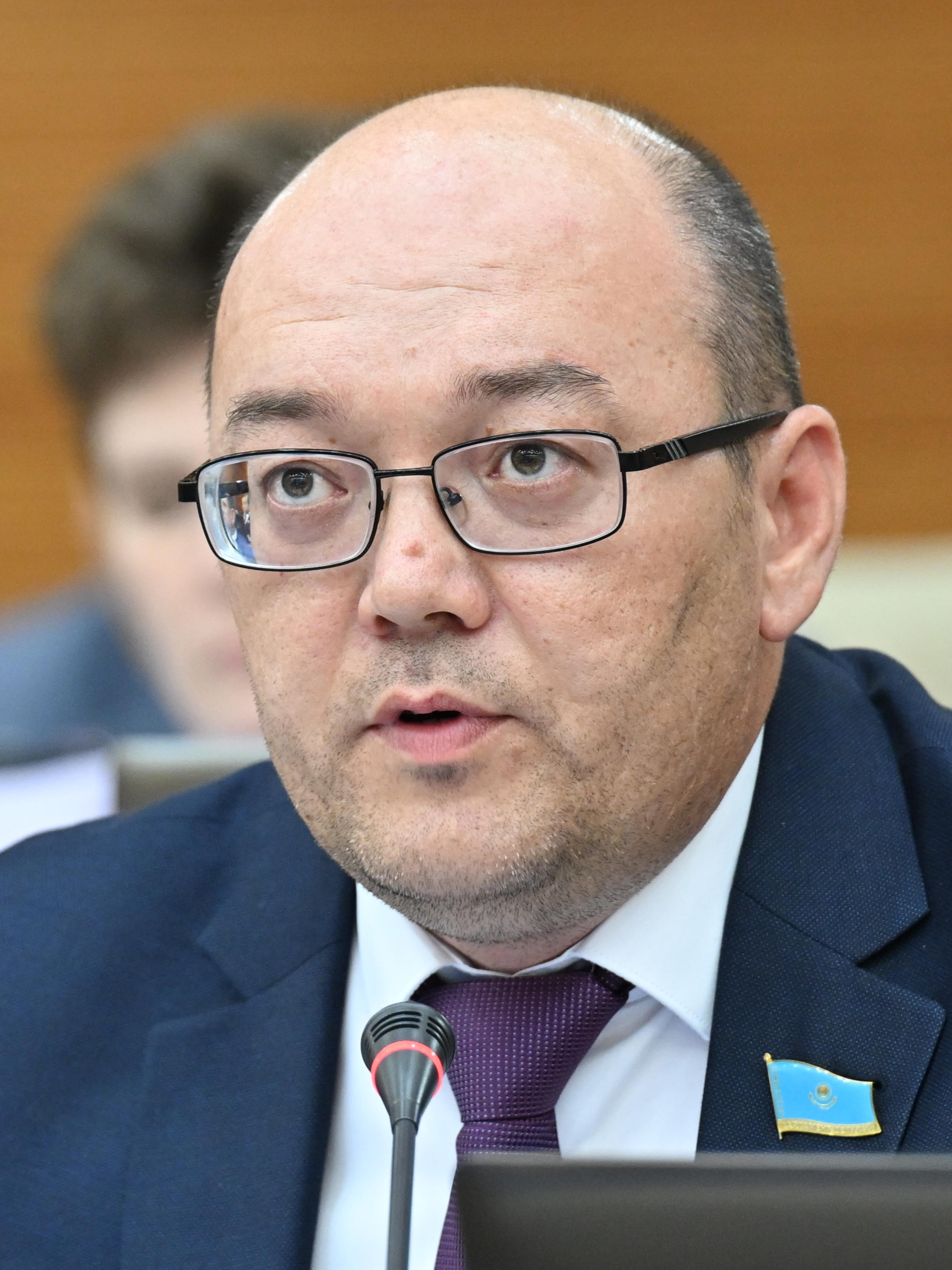
	Majority party	Minority party	Third party
Leader	Erlan Qoşanov	Äli Bektaev	Aidarbek Qojanazarov
Party	Amanat	Auyl	Respublica
Last election	71.09%, 76 seats	5.29%, 0 seats	Did not exist
Seats won	62	8	6
Seat change	▼14	▲8	New
Popular vote	3,431,510	693,938	547,154
Percentage	53.90%	10.90%	8.59%
Swing	▼17.19pp	▲5.61pp	New
	Fourth party	Fifth party	Sixth party
Leader	Azat Peruashev	Ermūhamet Ertısbaev	Ashat Raqymjanov
Party	Aq Jol	QHP	JSDP
Last election	10.95%, 12 seats	9.10%, 10 seats	Boycotted
Seats won	6	5	4
Seat change	▼6	▼5	▲4
Popular vote	535,139	432,920	331,058
Percentage	8.41%	6.80%	5.20%
Swing	▼2.54pp	▼2.30pp	▲5.20pp
- Results by region
Prime Minister before election
Älihan Smaiylov
Amanat
Elected Prime Minister
Älihan Smaiylov
Amanat

Snap legislative elections were held in Kazakhstan on 19 March 2023 to elect the members of the Mäjilis. This was the ninth legislative election since Kazakhstan's independence in 1991 and the first snap election for the Mäjilis seats since 2016. It was held alongside the local assembly elections.

At the September 2022 State of the Nation Address, President Kassym-Jomart Tokayev announced snap legislative elections to take place in the first half of 2023 in the aftermath of deadly unrest in January 2022. During that time, a series of laws and amendments were approved following the 2022 constitutional referendum, which aimed to reform Kazakhstan's political system by granting more parliamentary powers to the lower chamber Mäjilis as well as for its mandate seats to be allocated via mixed electoral system for the first time since 2004. Following Tokayev's reelection win in the 2022 presidential election, he signed a presidential decree on 19 January 2023 in dissolving the 7th Mäjilis and setting the date for the snap legislative election to take place in March 2023.

A total of seven parties contested the election, including the newly registered parties of Respublica and Baytaq, as well as an overwhelming number of independent candidates participating in electoral districts. Campaigning centered on political and socioeconomic issues such as regional development, national security, agricultural land nationalisation, education, workers' salaries, environmental problems and protection for the Aral Sea and Syr Darya.

Several independent opposition candidates under the pressure of the Kazakh government were excluded from the ballots due to alleged claims of election law violations during the campaigning period.

== Background ==
The 7th Parliament of Kazakhstan was formed in the aftermath of the 2021 legislative elections, in which the composition of the lower house Mäjilis was left unchanged as only three pro-government parties, Nur Otan (now Amanat), Aq Jol, and the People's Party of Kazakhstan, retained their factions in the parliament. The ruling Nur Otan party, though unusually losing more seats, continued to keep their 76-seat supermajority control of the Mäjilis. The legislative elections were the first to take place following the resignation of President Nursultan Nazarbayev in 2019. At that time, Nazarbayev continued serving as the chairman of Nur Otan and had held a variety of notable political positions and powers in his post-presidency, most importantly the influential Security Council chairmanship. Following the 2021 elections, Mäjilis chairman Nurlan Nigmatulin (Nur Otan) and Prime Minister Asqar Mamin were reappointed to their respective posts, along with Dariga Nazarbayeva returning as a deputy were moves described as a continued political influence held by Nazarbayev over the new parliament due to his control over the ruling party and an open endorsement of those key government names.

Throughout the legislative term of the 7th Parliament, a series of major constitutional and political reforms in par with President Kassym-Jomart Tokayev's policies took place in Kazakhstan with hundreds of proposed bills being passed by the parliament.

=== 2022 unrest and constitutional referendum ===
In January 2022 massive protests and unrest occurred in Kazakhstan after a sudden hike in liquefied petroleoum gas (LPG) prices in the city of Zhanaozen. The protests originally started as small rallies from Zhanaozen with demands in reduction of the LPG prices, but quickly spread grew to nationwide protests in calls for political and socioeconomic reforms. President Tokayev, in a failed attempt to appease the growing protests, pledged to take measures by setting a price cap on LPG and other forms of fuel and basic food products, as well as instituting a moratorium on utility costs and rent subsidies for low-income people. This led him to dismiss Asqar Mamin's government and enact a state of emergency, along with a deadly force order which was provided by the backing of foreign peacekeeping forces from the Collective Security Treaty Organization, after chaotic unrest broke out in the largest city of Almaty and the rest of Kazakhstan's territory.

As the aftermath of the January 2022 unrest was left with inflicted civilian casualties and costly property damages across the country, President Tokayev – following his takeover of the Security Council chairmanship from Nazarbayev – announced a new wave of political and constitutional reforms in a March 2022 State of the Nation Address. These reforms would lessen his executive powers and allocate more authority to the parliament. To do so, he initiated a referendum that would allow for Kazakh citizens to directly vote for the proposed 56 amendments. In a 2022 constitutional referendum, an overwhelming majority of Kazakhs had officially voted in favour for changes to the Constitution of Kazakhstan, which changed nearly a total of one-third or 33 articles in the document. The newly proposed amendments included changes within the structure of governance, electoral system, decentralisation of power between the levels of governments, and paved the way for complete stripping of Nazarbayev's remaining constitutional powers of being a Elbasy (leader of the nation).

=== 2022 presidential election ===
Amid speculations of power consolidation, President Tokayev announced 2022 snap presidential elections for November in his September 2022 State of the Nation Address, citing his personal need for a "new mandate of trust from the people" and said that the early election would "significantly lower the risks of power monopolisation". The move was described by Reuters as an attempt by Tokayev to strengthen his "mandate as an independent leader" and potentially avoid economic deterioration and loss of public support if holding elections ahead of originally scheduled date for 2024. Sceptics suggested the possibility of Tokayev using the 2022 presidential elections as a way to extend his rule similarly to his predecessor Nazarbayev, citing Tokayev's current control over all major branches of Kazakh government and his proposal for a new constitutional amendment that would change the presidential term of office to a nonrenewable seven-year term. In an effort to boost his support after the announcement of elections, Tokayev declared amnesty for the participants in the January 2022 unrest and supported reverting the controversial capital name of Nur-Sultan back to Astana.

Due to early timing of the 2022 presidential election, the political sphere was left without the organisation of the opposition, as no new political party had been registered due to the Kazakh legislation restricting citizens in contesting the race. With exception of Tokayev seeking reelection, other presidential contestants were described as "pocket candidates" due to their little public popularity who did not pose any significant electoral challenge to Tokayev. The results left Tokayev securing an 81.3% landslide victory in the election, with Tokayev in his inaugural speech promising to fulfill his election programme within the remaining seven years of his presidential term.

=== 2023 Senate elections ===
After assuming office, Tokayev announced January 2023 Senate elections, stressing the need in "continuation of the practical implementation of the constitutional reform", adding that the results will allow for Senate deputy corps to be renewed in "principles of competition and openness". This decision came after constitutional changes in the structure and powers of the Senate and the coming term expiration for senators that were previously elected in 2017, to which the senate election would be conducted as part of Tokayev's political reforms.

In total, 20 senators were elected by local assemblies (mäslihats) with 130 people initially nominating their candidacies, including several barred activists who claimed of constitutional rights violations that prevented them from becoming candidates.

=== Snap election speculations ===
Speculations of snap elections for parliament began during the January 2022 unrest, with unconfirmed media reports of Tokayev potentially discussing the issue of dissolving the 7th Parliament. A variety of predictions were made, many of which predicted snap legislative elections sometime in late 2022 or early 2023.

After Tokayev initially announced his package of political reforms in the upcoming September 2022 State of the Nation Address, several political commentators expressed support for holding snap legislative elections, with political analyst Zamir Qarajanov citing a need in change of laws regarding elections and deputies and that the if a snap election is called by Tokayev, then it would likely be held sometime around January and February 2023. According to Gaziz Äbişev, the drafting of new political reforms would concern parties and elections and that it would lead to the issue of the early dissolution of the parliament being raised. Proponents of an early vote for Mäjilis concluded that Tokayev must first present his package of political reforms that would allow for newer parties to form and conduct the legislative timeframe for their implementation before scheduling a snap election date. Political scientist Älibek Tajibaev argued against snap election, saying that the parliamentary formation is strongly tied with the general election style, noting that voting dates are "predetermined chronologically" and that non-parliamentary and newly formed parties should prepare for the regularly scheduled 2025 legislative election by instead focusing their campaigning first in municipal races.

Despite widescale discussions of a potential snap election, Mäjilis chairman Erlan Qoşanov in April 2022 dismissed any rumours of an early dissolution of the 7th Parliament, claiming that issues of holding an early vote had not been discussed at all.

However, on 1 September 2022 at the State of the Nation Address, Tokayev officially announced snap legislative elections in the first half of 2023. He cited the need for the legislative bodies to be "naturally renewed" and said that a new parliamentary composition will represent the interests of "broad groups of citizens" to allow executive branch to enact more "balanced decisions", adding that the snap legislative election would conclude "a reset and renewal of all major political institutions". At the 23 November 2022 plenary session of the Mäjilis, chairman Qoşanov in regard to the timing for an upcoming snap election, stated that the announcement of it would be made by Tokayev and forecast the date to be held sometime in 2023. Shortly after Tokayev's reelection win in the 2022 presidential election, he signed a decree on 26 November in approving an action plan made under the basis of his electoral programme, which initially included a deadline in holding of a Mäjilis election no later than June 2023.

==== Dissolution of the 7th Parliament ====
In early January 2023, the insider source of KazTAG reported on the dissolution of Mäjilis taking place within a coming week, to which the possibility of it was confirmed on 11 January by the head of the Mäjilis Committee on Legislation and Judicial and Legal Reform Arman Qojahmetov, who suggested for the dissolution to be declared by Tokayev sometime in the month of January, though not ruling out the power of Mäjilis members to request the parliament to be dissolved themselves.

On 19 January 2023, Tokayev signed a presidential decree in officially abolishing the 7th convocation of Mäjilis and scheduling the snap legislative elections to take place on 19 March 2023, a date noted to specifically coincide with Nowruz and former president Nursultan Nazarbayev's resignation four years earlier. Upon singing the decree, Tokayev praised the Mäjilis members for their legislative work, saying that they had set the example of "high professionalism, responsibility to citizens and sincere patriotism". In a following address to Kazakh citizens, Tokayev expressed hope for the "updated compositions of deputies" and that the Central Election Commission and the Prosecutor General's Office along with poll observers will strictly monitor the "rule of law, transparency and fairness" of the election, whilst taking into account of campaign demonstrating "a high level of political culture" and contributing the "consolidation of our society". He also added that the snap elections will be final stage of "rebooting state institutions" that would coincide with the formula of a "strong President – influential Parliament – accountable Government".

== Electoral system ==
Under Article 85 of the Constitutional Law "On Elections", the legislative elections in Kazakhstan for the Mäjilis members, who are known as deputies, are held within five years after the expiration of a legal term length for Mäjilis deputies. In accordance with Article 51 of the Constitution, a person must be at least 25 years or older and had been a permanent resident for the last ten years in Kazakhstan to serve as a member of the Mäjilis.

=== 2022 amendments ===
Following constitutional changes as a result of the 2022 referendum, the number of seats in the Mäjilis was reduced from 107 to 98 (due to the abolition of the previous nine-seat quota that was reserved to the Assembly of People of Kazakhstan), leaving all the remaining seats to be elected through mixed-member majoritarian representation for the first time since 2004.

Under the new electoral system, the Mäjilis (consisting of total 98 deputies) is divided into the following methods of election: 70% (69 deputies) from closed list party-list proportional representation allocated using the largest remainder method and 30% (29 deputies) from single-member districts that use the first-past-the-post voting (FPTP) method.

=== Electoral and party-list quota ===
Under Kazakh law, a series of legal quotas are mandated regardingthe political party's overall performance in the election and its electoral list of candidates.

Article 97-1 of the Constitutional Law "On Elections" establishes a minimum 5% electoral threshold (previously reduced from 7% in 2021) for a party to earn proportional representational seats in the Mäjilis. If only one party obtains at least 5% of the proportional vote share, then the party that received the next largest number of votes and hadn't overcome the electoral barrier is allowed to receive at least two mandates.

Since the 2021 election, a mandatory fixed share of political representatives had been in place, which Article 89 of the Constitutional Law "On Elections" requires for parties to include at least 30% quota of women, young people (aged under 29), and disabled persons within their electoral lists.

=== Electoral districts ===
On 22 November 2022, the Central Election Commission (CEC) adopted a resolution reestablishing electoral districts, which has been dissolved by a 2007 amendment, beginning on 1 January 2023 that would guarantee each region including cities of republican significance (Almaty, Astana, and Shymkent) one representative seat, with all constituencies including no more than the 20% difference between the number of registered voters residing in them.

The list of boundaries of the newly formed 29 single-member districts was drawn up and published on 24 December 2022, with the city of Almaty and Turkistan Region having the most elected representatives due to their population sizes.

Region	Deputies
Abai Region	1
Aktobe Region	1
Almaty Region	2
Atyrau Region	1
West Kazakhstan Region	1
Jambyl Region	2
Jetisu Region	1
Karaganda Region	2
Kostanay Region	1
Kyzylorda Region	1

Region	Deputies
Mangystau Region	1
Pavlodar Region	1
North Kazakhstan Region	1
Turkistan Region	3
Ulytau Region	1
East Kazakhstan Region	1
Astana	2
Almaty	3
Shymkent	3

== Timetable ==
Official variants used as logos of the 2023 election

Article 85 of the Constitutional Law "On Elections" stipulates that the legislative elections must be scheduled by the President five months in advance and conducted within two months before the termination of a current established term length for Mäjilis deputies (since 14 January 2021), in which the legislative elections should have been originally held no later than 14 November 2025.

In a Central Election Commission (CEC) meeting on 20 January 2023, deputy chairman Konstantin Petrov unveiled the calendar plan for the 2023 legislative election, upon which the total duration amounted to 59 days:

Date	Event
19 January	Dissolution of 7th Parliament; appointment of election date
20 January	Nomination and registration of candidates begin
8 February, 18:00	Nominations of candidates deadline
18 February	Registration of candidates deadline
18 February – 18 March	Election campaigning
13 March, 18:00	End of accreditation for foreign observers
18 March	Day of silence
19 March	Election day
19 March, 20:00	Vote count and protocol preparation for election results begin

== Parties ==
Prior to the 2021 legislative election, the mandatory threshold for party registration was initially reduced to 20,000 members in a way to allow for new parties to be formed. Despite the laxed rules, no new parties were registered during that time period as the Ministry of Justice repeatedly rejected the wishing parties' application requests. Eventually, President Tokayev proposed a constitutional law in lowering the registration threshold even more to 5,000 and reiterated that new parties will appear in political sphere, though asserted that some parties could not be "artificially" registered due to their violations of the law. He also later did not rule out the possibility of some newly upcoming Mäjilis deputies to hold opposition views.

Prior before the constitutional amendments regarding the eased party registration rules came to force, there were a total of 16 initiative groups formed in attempt to seek their legalised party status. Both the opposition parties of Alga, Qazaqstan and Namys failed to obtain their legal statuses. These instances were described due to inability of the Kazakh government registering independent parties that pose "real competition" and that only pro-government organisation would be registered.

=== Contesting ===
On 21 January 2023, the Central Election Commission (CEC) announced the admission of all seven registered political parties to participate in the 2023 legislative elections to field their candidates according to their party lists.

However, Vice Justice Minister Alma Mūqanova revealed that the ministry was considering two parties of El tağdyry and Ūrpaqtar jalğastyğy of their applicational documents and that if they succeed in passing state registration by 8 February 2023, then the additional parties would be permitted to also take part in the election. In spite of that, no further party registrations took place during that timeframe, thus leaving exactly seven previously registered parties to contest the race in the end.

The CEC on 18 February 2023 conducted a draw procedure which established the number listing that each contesting party appeared on the ballot by order:

Name		No.	Ideology	Position	Leader	2021 result		Political stance
Name		No.	Ideology	Position	Leader	Votes (%)	Seats	Political stance
Amanat	Amanat	1	Kazakh nationalism Social conservatism	Big tent	Erlan Qoşanov	71.1%	76 / 98	Pro-presidential
Auyl	"Auyl" People's Democratic Patriotic Party «Аuyl» Halyqtyq-Demokratialyq Patriottyq Partiasy	2	Agrarianism; Social democracy	Centre-left	Äli Bektaev	5.3%	0 / 98	Pro-government
Respublica	Respublica	3	National liberalism Social market economy	Centre-right	Aidarbek Qojanazarov	New		Pro-government (alleged)
QHP	People's Party of Kazakhstan; Qazaqstan Halyq Partiasy	4	Democratic socialism	Left-wing	Ermūhamet Ertısbaev	9.1%	10 / 98	Pro-presidential
Baytaq	"Baytaq" Green Party of Kazakhstan; Qazaqstannyñ «Baytaq» jasyldar partiasy	5	Green politics Environmentalism	Centre-left	Azamathan Ämirtai	New		Pro-presidential
Aq Jol	"Aq Jol" Democratic Party of Kazakhstan «Aq Jol» Qazaqstannyñ demokratialyq partiasy	6	Liberal conservatism Economic liberalism	Centre-right	Azat Peruashev	11%	12 / 98	Pro-presidential
JSDP	Nationwide Social Democratic Party; Jalpyūlttyq sotsial-demokratialyq partia	7	Social democracy Parliamentarism	Centre-left	Ashat Rahymjanov	Did not participate		Opposition (self-declared); Unclear (de facto)

==== Candidates by party affiliation ====
There were 283 candidates chosen from all seven participating parties within electoral lists, as well as 609 candidates nominated in all single-member districts in which overwhelmingly 525 were self-nominees (independents) whilst 79 candidates from seven political parties and 5 candidates from four public associations. The average number of nominated contestants in each constituency was 21 with the most being in Electoral district No. 1 and No. 2 of Astana (63 candidates each) and the least in No. 28 of Ulytau Region (6 candidates).

Following the registration period, 281 party list nominees officially became candidates (as two from Respublica dropped out of the race), with a mandatory quota of women, youth and persons with disabilities in each party list averaging to 38.1% of candidates as well as 12 ethnical representatives. In single-member districts, a total of 435 candidates were registered with 359 (82.5%) independents and 76 (17.5%) from parties, leaving 125 people having their candidatures rejected by the CEC due to voluntarily withdraws, improper document submissions, and campaign law violations. The average of constituent candidate was approximately 49–50 years old, with an overall gender composition making up of 350 (80.5%) male and 85 (20%) female including 10 ethnical representatives. There were an average of 15 registered candidates in Kazakhstan's constituencies as the greatest number of contestants being within the electoral districts No. 1 and No. 2 of Astana (41 and 42 candidates each), with the lowest in No. 25 of Turkistan Region (5 candidates).

Party	No. 1 in party list	No. of candidates		Total	Party list registration
Party	No. 1 in party list	Party list	Single-member district	Total	Party list registration
QHP	Ermūhamet Ertısbaev	52	15	67	11 February 2023 ✓
Aq Jol	Azat Peruashev	54	23	77	13 February 2023 ✓
JSDP	Ashat Raqymjanov	19	6	25	13 February 2023 ✓
Auyl	Jiguli Dairabaev	25	9	34	14 February 2023 ✓
Baytaq	Arman Qaşqynbekov	18	4	22	14 February 2023 ✓
Amanat	Erlan Abdiev	90	29	119	15 February 2023 ✓
Respublica	Aidarbek Hodjanazarov	23	4	27	15 February 2023 ✓
Independents	—N/a		359		—N/a

== Campaign ==
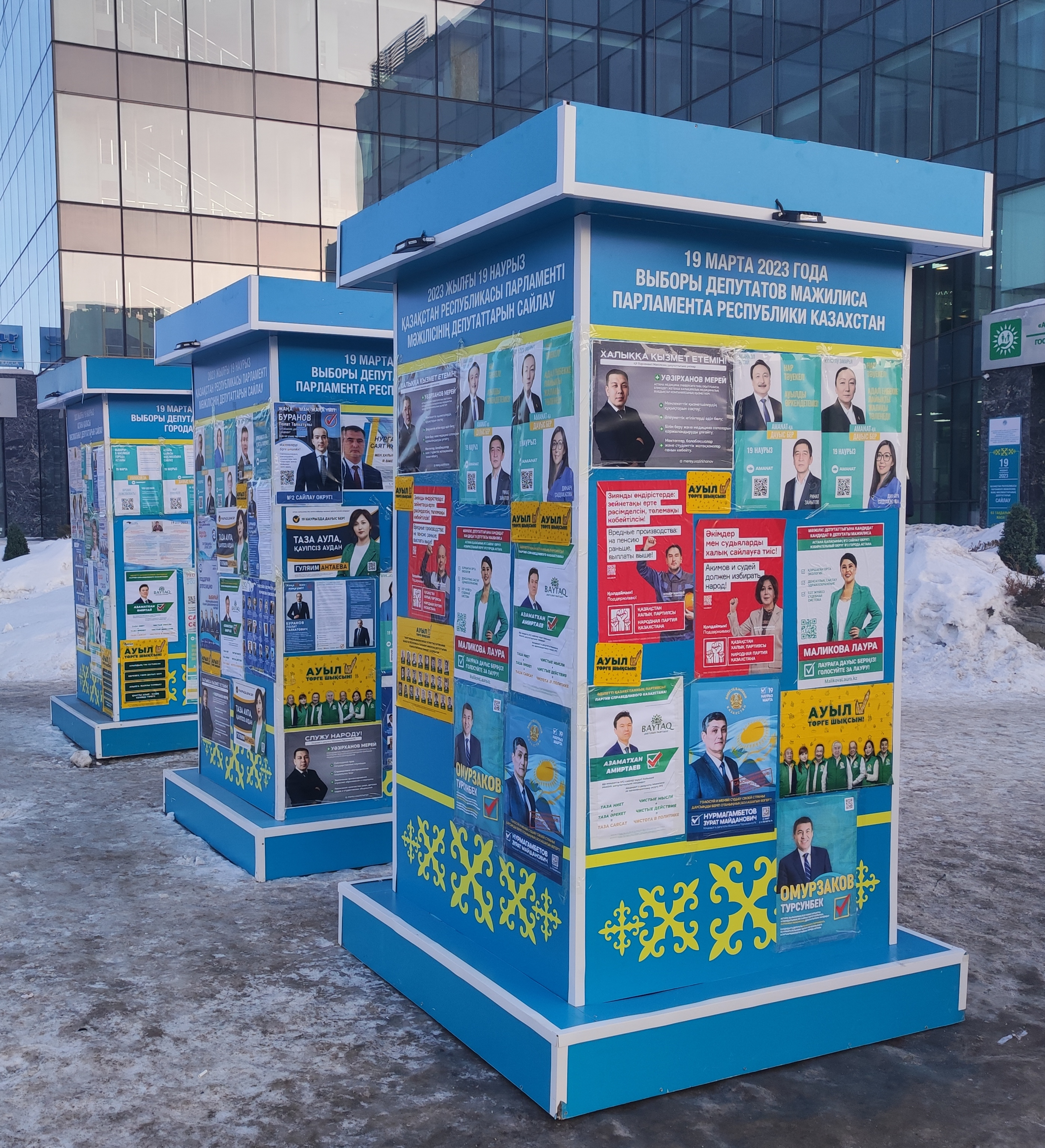
Public columns displaying the 2023 election campaign posters in Astana

According to Vice Minister of Information and Social Development Qanat Ysqaqov, the ministry would monitor information field during the electoral campaign and report any violations to the Prosecutor General's Office. Jandos Ömiräliev, the Deputy Prosecutor General, cited that the unlawful acts in the election would be conducting election campaigning during the period of its prohibition, obstruction of candidates as well as their proxies or political parties during their canvassing.

=== People's Party ===
The People's Party of Kazakhstan (QHP) in a political council meeting on 21 January 2023 announced that the party would actively participate in the elections and established the republican campaign headquarters.

On 30 January 2023, the 23rd QHP Extraordinary Congress was held. From there, party chairman Ermūhamet Ertısbaev called on Kazakh citizens to show up at polling stations rather than public squares to fulfill all demands "in a civilized and democratic way", embarking the effectiveness of changing the system via means of parliamentary resolutions. A number of issues were discussed at the congress, upon which were related to energy and industry, maternal support, as well as land transfer and migratory employment. Prior before the congress was held, the QHP experienced discontent within the party's membership as its three Mäjilis serving deputies most notably Jambyl Ahmetbekov had left the QHP with Ahmetbekov citing the unfitting new leadership of the party. The QHP in its party list included a total 52 people as well as 12 candidates in majoritarian districts for the election, to which Ertısbaev described the names as being the "best and most worthy members of the political organisation" and noted the multinational and social composition of the QHP candidates. According to Ertısbaev, the QHP had initially included more than 120 people in its party list, which was eventually narrowed down to in way to correlate with the actual distribution of seats in the Mäjilis, with Ertısbaev expressing confidence that the party would sweep around 40–45 seats.

=== Aq Jol Democratic Party ===
In a statement published by the Aq Jol on 20 January 2023, the party expressed its interest in taking part for Mäjilis election to which it should serve as the beginning of a "profound and fundamental change" in the fate of Kazakhstan.

The Aq Jol in its 21st Ordinary Congress on 1 February 2023, upon which was attended by the party members, adopted a decision in participating in the legislative election along the party's election programme. A total of 77 Aq Jol candidates were nominated with 54 of them being in the party list that included such people as chairman Azat Peruashev, Dania Espaeva, Qazybek Isa and Älia Raqyşeva. One of the names in the list was "Qairat Boranbaev", despite everyone suspecting that it may have been the controversial businessman Qairat Boranbaev who faced criminal investigations for alleged money embezzlement, it turned out to be a different person with the same name While the rest of 23 candidates were nominated for single-member districts by the Aq Jol. At the congress, Peruashev raised the issue regarding corruption and the "gap between rich and poor" due to a monopoly impact in economic and political spheres which brings the issues on the party's relevancy. He also expressed his willingness for the Aq Jol in the election to "gain the trust of the people", noting that "any ruling party" will lose power "sooner or later".

Months prior to the election, Aq Jol deputy Azamat Äbıldaev, was ousted from the party and removed from Mäjilis over his public support for Russia's invasion of Ukraine. Some speculated that this controversy was an act made to advertise the party in a good light. It is notable, however, that Äbıldaev later appeared as a guest in Russian propagandist Vladimir Solovyov's controversial show Solovyov LIVE, where he expressed his negative opinion about the "rising nationalism in Kazakhstan".

=== Nationwide Social Democratic Party ===
After previously boycotting the 2021 legislative elections, the self-declared opposition Nationwide Social Democratic Party (JSDP) expressed its willingness to take part in the snap election, citing the recent changes in "legislative conditions and the system of power itself".

The JSDP held its 20th Extraordinary Congress on 2 February 2023, to where it was attended by 46 party delegates and adopted a decision in developing the election programme. It also fielded its 25 Mäjilis candidates with 19 people being included in the JSDP party list whilst the rest of six candidates vying for seats in electoral districts, to which party chairman Ashat Raqymjanov asserted their popularity within their constituents.

=== Baytaq ===
The newly registered "Baytaq" Green Party of Kazakhstan on 20 January 2023 announced that it would participate for the first time in the election, citing an opportunity in changing the Kazakhstan's environmental responsibility policy. On 21 January, party chairman Azamathan Ämirtai revealed that Baytaq would aim at raising environmental issues within the parliamentary hearings.

The pre-election congress of Baytaq was held on 3 February 2023, from which Ämirtai while criticising other parties, insisted that the Baytaq party was fighting for "people's lives" by stressing the need of environmental protection in Kazakhstan and its correlation with the health and quality of life for citizens, to which Ämirtai described it as an "urgent issue". He addressed the needs in paying special attention to ecologic problematic areas of the Aral Sea and Semipalatinsk Test Site, as well as waste problems from subsoil users in western Kazakhstan. In a decision by the pre-election congress, 20 members were included in the party list of Baytaq, with an extra four candidates that included Ämirtai himself being nominated in territorial constituencies.

=== Auyl ===
Äli Bektaev, chairman of Auyl, in his official statement supported the decision in holding snap elections and embarked that party is ready to fight "honestly and openly in the new election cycle".

On 4 February 2023, the 22nd Auyl Extraordinary Congress was held from where it approved a list of 25 party list candidates and nine candidates for majoritarian districts. Auyl chairman Äli Bektaev speaking at the congress, voiced his high hopes for the party's performance in the election due its improved structural work and stressed the importance of the development of agriculture, agrarian sphere, and rural settlements to which Bektaev emphasised that enhancing the situation and citizens lives in villages would in turn lead to a subsequent improvement in urban cities. The published party list of Auyl received an unusual media attention after its names included both 2022 presidential candidates of the Auyl's first deputy chairman Jiguli Dairabaev and former ruling Amanat party member Qaraqat Äbden in the same listing, with Bektaev confirming Äbden's membership into the Auyl by stating that her social views on folk and rural traditions correlated with the party's ideology.

=== Respublica ===
On 21 January 2023, Respublica chairman Aidarbek Qojanazarov in the aftermath of the party's registration announced that Respublica would for the first time participate in the legislative elections, noting that the party would conduct the "most transparent and fair selection" of candidates. On 3 February 2023, it was announced that Respulica would hold its 1st Extraordinary Congress, where the party's updated charter would be presented and approved.

The congress held in an informal tie-less format took place on 6 February, where Qojanazarov stated that Respublica prioritises human capital as being "the greatest wealth" of Kazakhstan, specifically being in the fields of education and health. The party nominated a total of 29 candidates for the election from its list that included business representatives, with four competing for mandates in single-member districts.

=== Amanat ===
Prior before announcement of legislative elections, Amanat chairman Erlan Qoşanov in April 2022 had voiced his anticipation on the party's preparedness in the upcoming vote. After the dissolution of the 7th Parliament, Qoşanov in a 20 January 2023 party meeting stated that the Amanat supported Tokayev's decision in calling snap elections and asserted that the party is the "main driving force of progressive transformations", citing the previous work in helping the affected residents of Kostanay and Ekibastuz, as well regions that faced storm floods to which Qoşanov reiterated the Amanat's position of taking part in the election. On 31 January, Qoşanov revealed the party would hold its upcoming extraordinary congress.

On 7 February 2023, the 25th Amanat Extraordinary Congress took place to which more than 2,000 people attended that included political council members, former 7th Mäjilis deputies, party delegates, members from the party's Jastar Ruhy youth wing, as well as experts, representatives from NGO and the media. The Amanat nominated a total of 119 candidates (90 from party list and 29 in single-member districts) that encompassed former MPs, government officials, as well as notable bloggers, sports and chess players to which party chairman Qoşanov described the candidates as being "authoritative, educated and qualified people" and assuring that the composition of Amanat had led for it to become a "party of leaders".

=== Independents ===
In December 2022, a group of opposition activists and journalists, namely Arailym Nazarova, Älnur Iliaşev, Dinara Egeubaeva, and Duman Muhammedkärim, announced their candidacy for the 2023 legislative elections in Kazakhstan. They formed an independent electoral alliance called Altynşy Qañtar (Sixth January, in relation to the 2022 unrest), which aimed to support various opposition candidates running in both national and local races. Iliaşev stated that the bloc's ultimate goal was to bring about significant democratic reforms by gaining representation in the parliament. Out of the four mentioned names, only Egeubaeva and Nazarova were able to be successfully register as candidates, as Iliaşev and Muhammedkärim were both initially barred from running in the election due to their criminal records and failures to reside as permanent resident, respectively. However, Muhammedkärim successfully appealed his rejected candidature in the Electoral district No. 12 of Almaty Region, resulting in his candidacy being registered in the constituency.

By early February 2023, several independent candidates had expressed interest in running for the constituent races for Mäjilis, which included businessman Sanjar Boqaev, leader of the unregistered Namys party; civil activist Inga Imanbai, spouse of jailed unregistered Democratic Party leader Janbolat Mamai; civil activist Maks Boqaev, participant in the 2016 anti-land reform protests; journalist Äset Mataev, founder of KazTAG news agency; journalist Ermurat Bapi, former chairman of the opposition Nationwide Social Democratic Party; and aqyn Rinat Zaiytov, participant in the 2019 presidential election protests. All of these candidates were registered to run, leaving only Maks Boqaev in failing to undergo the candidate registration process due to his current criminal conviction over involvement in the 2016 protests. Zayitov, known to be an opposition critic of President Tokayev and the government, was suddenly included in the electoral list of the ruling Amanat party. This sparked a huge outrage amongst Zayitov's supporters to which in response, Zayitov dispelled the criticism by stressing his goal at the Amanat party was to "change it from the inside out" and in turn asked for his support in the election.

On 19 February 2023, civil activists Älnur Iliaşev and Murat Turymbetov, along with opposition independent candidates held a sanctioned campaign rally in Gandi Park, Almaty, to which 100 people attended. From there, Arailym Nazarova, head of NGO Independent Observers, criticised the percentage of majoritarian representation in the parliament and called for independent observation in the election as way to ensure the transparency of the vote. Äset Mataev in the rally supported an "independent parliament" composed of "free people" rather than "push-button deputies" that would make Kazakhstan "rich and happy", noting that the last "free elections" were held in 2004 by using Serikbolsyn Abdildin as an example of a candidate that managed to be elected through such system. Sociologist Janar Jandosova in participation of the rally, drew attention to a low voter turnout rate in Almaty and thus urged people to show up at the polls. Politician Muhtar Taijan, speaking at the event, asserted that if at least 10 opposition candidates manage to be elected in the parliament, then they would be able "to achieve reforms that the people need". While criticising President Tokayev's administration, Taijan also called on fair elections and stressed the need in "real and popular candidates" to come into power, in which he announced the formation of an electoral alliance in a following day that would be composed of independent candidates.

A press conference took place in Almaty on 20 February by independent opposition candidates on the official announcement of the creation of an electoral alliance, which included Aiman Tursunhan, Ermurat Bapi, Muhtar Taijan, Sanjar Boqaev, Erlan Qaliev as well as Altynşy Qañtar bloc founder Arailym Nazarova, to which she stated that her work was carried out autonomously and that she was not involved in the bloc's activities. The candidates stressed the need for unification of independent candidates in order to "increase the competence of parliament as a common goal", not ruling out the demands in returning a parliamentary system in Kazakhstan and poised themselves as supporters of majoritarian representation. At the conference, an election manifesto was adopted by the founding bloc, which pledged to maintain the balance of three branches of government, ensuring greater local government, freedom of press, and the nation's wealth belonging to the people while under pretext of a "strong parliament, accountable government" (a somewhat resemblance of President Tokayev's ideological view).

== Controversies ==
=== Campaign law violations ===
Prior to the campaigning period, the ruling Amanat party received widespread attention from social media after the party's election advertisement was spotted being illegally installed on several public billboard displays in Karaganda, a day in advance by the required law. In response to the backlash, the Amanat party's regional branch acknowledging the violation of the election law in an official statement, revealed that its campaign banner was hung by its advertising contractors and that the banner was subsequently removed within 30 minutes after the party's regional branch responded to the complaints. The party also announced that it would it take legal action and unilaterally terminate its contract with the service providers behind the incident. Opposition activist and independent deputy candidate, Sanjar Boqaev, criticised the ruling Amanat party following the incident, in which he called for the party to be barred from participating in the elections, citing the legal provision within the election law in regard to its violation.

Several opposition candidates also had come under scrutiny by the Kazakh prosecutors, due to allegedly violating election laws as well such as independents Marat Jylanbaev, Amangeldi Jahin, and Jasulan Aitmağanbetov, by which they were accused of illegally conducting their agitation on social media during the pre-campaign timeframe of the election and in result, faced fines and revoking of their candidacy registration. Despite the punishments, the independent candidates dismissed the court's rulings, insisted that communication on social media was not legally defined as an "agitation". Temirtas Synmetullaev, deputy candidate from Karaganda, received a fine on 2 March 2023 due to his pre-campaign Facebook posts in which he denied accusations, claiming the use of alleged photoshopping over his posted words.

The Prosecutor General's Office of Kazakhstan issued a conclusive report on 17 March, stating 23 election law violations, mainly related to prohibited campaigning (such as unnamed candidates providing free taxi rides or sand-gravel mixture services), unauthorized independent polling, and distribution of anonymous or vandalizing campaign materials.

=== Exclusion of independent candidates ===
A number of candidates who were mostly independents were barred and even excluded from the national and local elections despite previously overgoing the registration requirements, mainly due to their tax noncompliances to even allegations of copyright infringements as well by the courts. Deputy PM and Finance Minister Erulan Jamaubaev denied any political motivations for the refusals in registration of independent candidates for the election, adding that the State Revenue Committee would verify mistakes in the candidates' financial declarations.

Civil activist Äigerım Tıleujan originally had her candidacy rejected by the Almaty's District Election Commission No. 3 on 17 February 2023, due to her electoral registration fee being deemed not authentic as Tıleujan was under investigation by the Kazakh authorities for allegedly inciting an attack on the Almaty International Airport during the January 2022 unrest. In an appeal effort, Tıleujan successfully won a lawsuit against the district election commission's decision in a ruling made by the Supreme Court of Kazakhstan on 27 February, thus essentially becoming a registered candidate in the election. However on 11 March 2023, Tıleujan was once again removed from the race by the district election commission, due to "discrepancies" in her tax returns. Qaiyrğali Köneev, a physician and public figure, was denied registration as an independent deputy candidate on the absurd basis of leaving Kazakhstan and never returning despite having to physically lived and worked in Almaty the whole time, in which Köneev ironically demanded to be awarded and nominated for the Nobel Prize as being the world's first teleported person.

In response to increasing pressure by the Kazakh government over its removal of independent candidates, opposition activists in a press conference on 9 March 2023 voiced their concerns over the issue, complaining about being "illegally alienated" from the elections and that the decision was unfounded, an allegation that was dismissed by the CEC member Şavkat Ötemisov as he suggested for candidates to instead "appeal to the court and try again to participate in the elections." On 17 March, the CEC reported that a total of 166 complaints were filed to the courts by the removed candidates and that only six of the candidates had their registration successfully reinstated. According to Asylbek Aijaryquly, member of the CEC, an "objective decision" regarding the removal of independent candidates will be determined by a court case.

The frequent changes to the list of candidates posed challenges in preparing the voting ballots, as some candidates who had withdrawn from their constituent races were mistakenly included in the thousands of already printed ballots near election day. In Almaty, the chairwoman of the territorial election commission, Aigül Qalyqova, explained that election commission members were required by law to manually cross out the names of withdrawn candidates with a blue pen and leave their personal signatures next to the crossed-out columns.

=== Political pressure towards candidates ===
Journalist and independent candidate Inga Imanbai for Electoral district No. 3 (Almaty) during her campaign announced in holding of a solitary picket in support of Ukraine for the first anniversary of Russian's invasion on 24 February 2023, in which her request was rejected by the Almaty äkim Erbolat Dosaev for allegedly submitting her permission a day late. Imanbai dismissed the moves by the akimat as "bureaucratic delays" being "used as excuses" and accused the Kazakh government of refusing its citizens in showing support for the Ukrainian people. Nevertheless, Imanbai initially pledged to hold an anti-war speech instead in her election headquarters office. On 27 February, Imanbai reported that she was summoned by the police due to inciting a "national animus" after holding a single picket protest in the office of Human Rights Bureau in Kazakhstan. After her release from the police station, Imanbai accused the Kazakh authorities of attempting to remove her candidacy from the race due for holding pro-Ukraine views.

On 14 March 2023, a car parade in support of Mäjilis candidate Sabyrjan Qalmuhambetov for Electoral district No. 10 was held in Aktobe, in which the car drivers were forced to stop the campaign rally by the law enforcement due to Qalmuhambetov not obtaining an event permission from the city authorities. As a result, Qalmuhambetov's campaign faced investigation by the prosecutor's office due to his holding of an unsanctioned campaign rally.

=== Attacks against journalists ===
With the announcement of the 2023 elections, growing attacks on journalists across Kazakhstan had occurred beginning with journalist Dinara Egeubaeva, a Mäjilis candidate and one of founders of the Altynşy Qañtar electoral alliance, faced immediate intimidation shortly after announcing her interest in participating in the election in which a brick was thrown at her vehicle and then set on fire on the night of 14 January 2023 near her Almaty apartment. The following day on 15 January, Kazakh law enforcement detained five underaged suspects who were 15, 16, and 17 years of age in which they allegedly received orders from an unknown individual in exchange for bribes according to their own testimonies and were also accused of breaking a glass door entrance at the El Media office. Samal Ibraeva, chief editor of the Ulysmedia.kz, announced on 18 January 2023 that a cyberattack had occurred on the site which leaked personal information of herself and family members, accusing the National Security Committee (ŪQK) of being behind the cyberattack. On 8 February 2023, the Ulysmedia.kz editorial office in Astana having received a box of "raw meat and pictures of children", to which she described the incident as "intimidation". Journalist Vadim Boreiko of the "Гиперборей" YouTube channel, reported of a burned construction foam outside his apartment door in Almaty, as well as two cars belonging to him and videographer Roman Yegorov being burned down on 20 February. The incident led to a swift response by the Almaty Department of Internal Affairs by launching investigation in which the unnamed suspect behind the arson was subsequently arrested. Daniar Moldabekov, a Kazakh journalist and author of the "5 Қаңтар" ("5 January") Telegram channel, revealed on 22 February that a man with a medical mask was shot in the entrance of his Almaty residence. Gulnoza Said, coordinator at the Committee to Protect Journalists, urged the Kazakh government to ensure that the journalists' safety and for the criminals to be held accountable.

The increasing threats on journalists essentially prompted for President Tokayev to intervene by instructing law enforcement agencies to conduct thorough investigation of criminal acts towards journalists, in which Aqorda press secretary Ruslan Jeldibai accused the criminal instigators of damaging "public security and the reputation of the state". By 21 February 2023, the Ministry of Internal Affairs reported that 18 people had been arrested in relation to the attacks on journalists. Though, Deputy Internal Affairs Minister Marat Qojaev assessed that it was it was "too early to say that the attacks were carried out on the orders of someone." On 28 February, the Ministry of Internal Affairs and ŪQK announced the arrest of a suspect identified as "O. Tokarev", allegedly responsible for organised attacks against journalists and independent media, revealing that Tokarev was a foreign citizen and a skilled hacker, and he was accompanied by four other foreign nationals named "K. Litvinov," "S. Shapovalov," "B. Demchenko," and "Y. Malyshok." In a police report from 2 March 2023, it stated that Tokarev had pleaded guilty and agreed to cooperate with the Kazakh authorities in the criminal probe.

=== Arman Şoraev lawsuit ===
On 24 February 2023, Arman Şoraev, an independent candidate for Mäjilis in the Electoral district No. 2 (Astana), sparked a scandal on social media by publishing a Facebook photo of members from the People's Party of Kazakhstan (QHP) and writing "Do not vote for these traitors" underneath the caption, to which the post was criticised for its divisive language and perceived discreditation on the party by the QHP chairman Ermukhamet Ertisbaev, who threatened to file lawsuit to the Prosecutor General's Office against Şoraev for slander unless he deletes the post and offers a public apology. Şoraev in response deleted the post but subsequently made a new one taking aim directly at Ertisbaev, where he noted that Ertisbaev had long served as an advisor to former president Nursultan Nazarbayev and called on him instead to publicly apologise for his previous YouTube interview with Russian propagandist Vladimir Solovyov where he expressed controversial remarks towards Russian President Vladimir Putin for saving Kazakhs "from the Nazis during the January Events", reiterating once again for Ertisbaev being a "traitor", as well as suggesting to hold a live debate with him.

On 5 March 2023, the QHP under the behalf of its plaintiff Nuria Baltabaiqyzy, filed a class action lawsuit against Şoraev for spreading the "false information" about the party, which if proven in court, would lead for Şoraev having his Mäjilis candidacy be deregistered from the election. The hearings initially set to be held from 6 March, were postponed that same day for 10 March after plaintiff Baltabaiqyzy failed to show up. On 14 March, the Interdistrict Court of Astana found Şoraev guilty of disseminating the QHP, though the judicial act decision by the court would come into force until election day on 19 March, which nevertheless allowed for Şoraev to remain on the ballot in the race and insisting as the incident being a provocation by the Kazakh government to delegitimise his campaign.

=== Anti-riot bill ===
The Senate of Kazakhstan approved a draft law "On introduction of amendments and additions to some legislative acts of the Republic of Kazakhstan on the prevention of human rights in the field of criminal proceedings, execution, as well as other cruel, inhuman or defamatory acts of torture". The law proposes stricter penalties under Article 272 of the Penal Code for individuals who call for the incitement of mass riots by increasing the maximum prison sentence from 3 to 5 years and from 3 to 7 years on social media, as well as increasing the maximum sentence for hooliganism committed as part of a criminal group from 5 to 7 years in prison without parole. The vote took place during a plenary session ahead of the election on 9 March 2023, with Interior Minister Marat Ahmetjanov expressing support for the legislation. The bill was subsequently signed into law by President Tokayev on 17 March.

=== Electoral fraud allegations ===
Concerns about electoral fraud arose ahead of the election, after photos circulating on social media from several polling stations in Shymkent had allegedly shown the existence of voting results protocols completed with numbers indicating the votes cast for each candidate shortly before polls were opened to the public. Ömir Şynybekuly, an independent candidate running in Shymkent II, called on the Prosecutor General's Office to intervene and urged President Tokayev to temporarily suspend the powers of the Shymkent City Akimat. In response, the Shymkent Territorial Election Commission chairman Qaiybek Qunanbaev dismissed the claims of prepared voting protocol results as being "fake stuffing and provocation", insisting that election protocols are filled after voting takes place and noted the absence of a seal in the alleged precinct result tallies.

After polls opened on election day, independent monitoring NGO Erkindik Qanaty claimed election violations, which included restrictions on observer movements, limited visibility of the voter registration process, bans on photo and video recording, campaign activities by the precinct election commission chairman, and failure to provide an observer's chair which served as a violation of instructions for equipping the polling station. Voting irregularities emerged across Kazakhstan, with numerous videos captured by independent observers showing instances of ballot box stuffing and carousel voting taking place in polling stations. Others at several polling sites witnessed surveillance cameras being covered with tape. Azamat Sarğazin, head of the Public Interest Protection Service of the Prosecutor General's Office, reported that 18 members of the election commission were fined and suspended due to election violations involving in issuing voting ballots to people for relatives. CEC chairman Nurlan Äbdirov, acknowledging the possible vote tampering, requested the Prosecutor General's Office for "an inspection and legal assessment" of widespread irregularities. The Prosecutor General's Office in the aftermath of the vote, registered a total of 40 violations during election day, upon which included election campaigning after its prohibition period.

== Conduct ==
Elections in Kazakhstan are prepared and conducted and by various bodies of election commissions.

In a meeting held on 20 January 2023, the Central Election Commission (CEC) discussed a series of issues in relation to the appointment of elections, approval of a timetable, establishment of election document forms, and the activities of election observers from foreign states and international organisations, as well foreign media representatives.

=== Public funding ===
The Ministry of Finance on 19 January 2023 announced that a total amount of 33.4 billion tenge originally would be spent for the 2023 election, a higher number than the 2022 presidential election funding, to which the Finance Ministry assessed that the costs for the snap election are included as part of the draft 2023–2025 budget and that the spending amount was initially reserved for 2025 fiscal year. According to the Ministry, the increased public expenses are taken into account for the introduction of a mixed electoral system.

On 8 February 2023, the CEC confirmed that 33.4 billion tenge were officially allocated for the election.

=== Voter registration ===
By 1 July and 1 January every year, information on voters and the boundaries of polling stations are submitted by the local executive bodies (akimats) in electronic form to their territorial election commissions, which ensure the verification and submission of information to the higher election commissions. There were approximately 11,976,406 registered voters in Kazakhstan as of 1 January 2023.

Voter registration in Kazakhstan is conducted by a local executive body from the moment of announcement or appointment of elections and are compiled within the voter list, which are based on place of residence in the territory of the given electoral precinct. The voter list for each polling station is approved by the akim (local head), who issues an ordinance twenty days (27 February 2023) before the election.

To vote absentee, a voter must notify the äkimat no later than thirty days (17 February 2023) before the election by applying their current place of residence for inclusion in a voter list at a different polling station. From 4 March 2023, absentee ballots began to be issued out to voters, which would take place until 18:00 local time on 18 March. In total, 22,578 absentee ballots were issued by the precinct election commissions based on voters' written applications.

As of 26 February 2023, the number of registered voters reached 12,032,550 people, upon which were all subsequently included in electoral rolls according to the data transferred by the akimats. Fifteen days before election day (from 4 March 2023), Kazakh citizens were given an opportunity to verify themselves in voter listing for their respective polling stations. According to deputy chairman of the CEC, Konstantin Petrov, the informational data on registered voters will be transferred and protected by the Ministry of Digital Development, Innovation and Aerospace Industry, which would inform Kazakh citizens about their voter listing inclusion via SMS messaging.

On 17 March 2023, it was announced that Kazakh citizens without a residence permit would be allowed in registering to vote at 118 polling stations across the country on election day from 7:00 to 20:00 local time. The JSC Government for Citizens employees provided this service to allow citizens to exercise their voting and constitutional rights to which the polling stations included educational facilities, though voters who registered there were subsequently automatically deregistered after the election on 20 March.

=== COVID-19 guidelines ===
During the CEC briefing on 23 January 2023, Chief Sanitary Doctor of Kazakhstan Aijan Esmağambetova addressed the epidemiological situation regarding the ongoing COVID-19 pandemic, in which she noted a decrease in COVID-19 cases within the last two weeks though did not rule out the seasonal rise of the virus along with influenza infections. While Kazakhstan was classified under low-risk "green zone" nationwide in relation to the level of COVID-19's transmission, seven regions (cities of Shymkent, Almaty, and Atyrau; East Kazakhstan Region, Karaganda Region, Kostanay Region, and Mangystau Region) had the reproductive rate of the virus (R indicator) above one, which recommended face coverings in crowded settings. When taking into account of these indications, Esmağambetova recommended for political organisations to hold events within spacious premises, upon which should be provided uninterrupted functioning of the ventilation system as well as urging residents living in the regions under the R-indicator above one to mask up in crowded areas.

Prior to the vote, Esmağambetova warned that a new mixed electoral system would lead to an increased voter turnout and in response, she called to regulate the flow of people in polling stations, as well as continuous function of ventilation/AC at the rate of 4 sq/m, and regulatory sanitation of election premises during voting day.

=== Disabled voters ===
In an effort to ensure the rights of disabled persons, the CEC on 27 January 2023 adopted a resolution which recommended for local executive bodies (akimats) to ensure and assist election commissions in providing voting conditions for people with disabilities at polling stations, checking the accessibility of polling stations with the participation of representatives from public associations of persons with disabilities, as well as provide additional measures to ensure special conditions. The CEC had also recommended for Kazakh citizens, the Ministry of Labour and Social Protection and akimats to update disabled voters' information, as well as locations of polling stations in the Interactive Accessibility Map.

On 27 February 2023, CEC chairman Nurlan Äbdirov revealed that polling stations would be equipped with all necessary conditions for persons with visual impairments, which would additional lighting and magnifiers.

=== Preparations ===
On 23 January 2023, the CEC unveiled its main direction by prioritising the improvement of the "legal literacy and electoral culture" for all participants in the election process which included in conducting training and education for all nationwide election commission members in under following areas:

- Online workshop meetings;
- Field training and inspection workshop meetings in the regions;
- Distance learning and testing;
- Workshops for members of election commissions based on regional branches of the Academy of Public Administration under the President;
- Field training workshop meetings and trainings by territorial election commission (TEC) members;
- Workshops for members of 69 precinct election commissions formed at Kazakhstan's overseas representative offices.

Since the beginning of the election campaign, 230 call centers aimed at informing Kazakh citizens regarding their inclusion into electoral rolls were established in all regions of Kazakhstan, to which it received more than 17,000 requests by late February 2023.

The CEC approved five voting ballot designs for the 2023 election on 27 February, including blue-coloured ballots (party voting) and green-coloured ballots (constituency vote). For the first time, an ISO 216 paper format would be used as voting ballots for a better visual readability, in which party list vote ballots would contain eight columns and the constituency vote ballots include up to 16 candidate names. The CEC also established that the total number of printed paper ballots for the legislative elections would be based on the total number of registered voters (12,032,550 people), including an excess of 1% of the registered voting population, which would amount to 12,152,876 pieces for each party and constituency voting ballots.

On 27 February 2023, Vice Minister of Digital Development, Innovation and Aerospace Industry Äset Turysov announced that starting 6 March 2023, the Unified Platform of Internet Resources of State Bodies along with eGov.kz will launch the "Search for a polling station through Individual Identification Number (IIN)" system, as well as SMS notifications to mobile users. That same day, the Ministry of Foreign Affairs announced the formation of 77 polling stations in 62 countries for overseas voting, in which the ministerial representative Aibek Smadiarov urged Kazakh citizens wishing to take part in the election to contact and provide information to the foreign consular representation or institution of Kazakhstan to be included in their voter listing.

In total, 10,223 polling stations were formed for the election as summed up both domestically and aboard.

=== Election day ===
In the early dawn of 19 March 2023, polling stations began operating in Kazakhstan starting at 7:00 local time (with exception of 92 precincts being opened an hour earlier on 6:00 under the decision of territorial election commissions). As of 7:15 UTC+6, there were 8,272 polling stations functioning mostly in the eastern portion of Kazakhstan due to time differences as the regions of Aqtobe, Atyrau, West Kazakhstan, Qyzylorda and Mangystau would start voting an hour later according to the Astana time zone. During that period, President Tokayev himself had voted hours earlier in the Palace of Schoolchildren than previously anticipated, upon which the news of his vote was revealed later. According to the Ministry of Information and Social Development, the reasoning of Tokayev voting earlier was due to changes in his "work schedule" and that information was intentionally left unreported to the public. By 8:15 UTC+6, all of 10,146 polling stations were operating domestically. Former president Nursultan Nazarbayev had also made his public appearance after showing up to vote, to which he congratulated everyone for upcoming Nowruz holiday. As of 19:00 UTC+6, all 10,223 election precincts were in service as every overseas voting site had been opened in accordance with their respective time zones. The duration of the voting period lasted 13 hours, with polling stations being closed on 20:00 local time.

The CEC began reporting its first voter turnout numbers for 10:00 UTC+6 and continued so every two hours until 22:00 evening time, when it presented the conclusive preliminary data of the national election turnout number of 54.2% (6,521,860 voters). Vote counting took place in every precinct starting 24:00 UTC+6 and was set to last until 08:00 UTC+6, 20 March 2023. From there, the CEC had also announced that it would address the preliminary results of the legislative election in the same following day.

== Observation ==
Prior to the 2022 presidential election, the Parliament adopted new amendments to the election law, which tightened requirements of the accreditation process of public associations and NGOs to observe elections. According to Roman Reimer, co-founder of the NGO Erkindik Qanaty, the newly imposed laws would lead to a more difficult process of election accreditation and likely lead to a "destruction of independent observation", as well as severely restrict the election monitoring job at the polling stations.

On 20 January 2023, the Central Election Commission (CEC) Secretary Muqtar Erman announced in the opening of the Institution for International Election Observation, to which the CEC sent invitations to international, interparliamentary organisations, as well as the diplomatic corps in Kazakhstan to participate in monitoring for the 2023 election in order to meet international obligations in ensuring "openness and transparency during the electoral campaign". By 2 February 2023, the CEC accredited first 25 observers from Palestine and two international organisations of CIS Interparliamentary Assembly and Office for Democratic Institutions and Human Rights (ODIHR) under the Organization for Security and Co-operation in Europe (OSCE).

By 13 March 2023, the CEC accredited a total of 793 election observers from 41 foreign countries and 12 international organisations.

=== OSCE ===
By invitation by the CEC, the OSCE Office for Democratic Institutions and Human Rights (ODIHR) on 8 February 2023 opened its election observation mission in Kazakhstan, headed by Eoghan Murphy, which consisted of its core team of 11 international experts based in Astana, as well as 32 long-term observers that would be deployed throughout the country from 17 February. The ODIHR also announced in plans to deploy 300 short-term observers several days before election day.

In an interim report published on 3 March 2023, the OSCE described the election campaigning in Kazakhstan as being "lively", specifically on social media and in single-member electoral districts where large number of candidates took part in the race, while raising concerns on numerous cases of "intimidation and harassment of critical online journalists and bloggers" which had formed a "perception of impunity and contribute to widespread self-censorship."

The OSCE in its preliminary finding praised the electoral preparations as being "administered efficiently and within the established deadlines", though noted lack of consistency and timely addressment of vote counting and tabulation as International Election Observation Mission (IEOM) observers consistently noted "discrepancies between the number of voters casting their ballots and the officially reported preliminary turnout figures", as observers reported in either facing restrictions or having an unclear view of the counting procedures and ballot column marks, thus raising serious concerns regarding the integrity of the election counting process.

== Debates ==
On 27 February 2023, the first televised debates between political parties were announced to be broadcast by the Qazaqstan channel, to which it was scheduled to be held for 1 March 2023 with the debates also being livestreamed on YouTube, Facebook, and Telegram channels of Qazaqstan. Representatives of all seven contesting parties took part in 1 March election debate. The debate consisted of four stages where party representatives answered a common political question briefly twice, asked and responded to each other's questions, and lastly with the representatives personally addressing voters. At the debate stage, a variety of issues were raised by the speakers in relation to societal injustice, improvement of working conditions, educational gap between urban and rural areas, raising of minimum wage, environmental protection, entrepreneurship development, and combatting corruption. The first televised debate discussion was noted to have completely neglected sensitive topics such as January Events and its aftermath investigation of civilian deaths, as well as issues of ongoing human rights violations in Kazakhstan, with the podium speakers unusually interrupting each other and violating the debate rules.

A second debate was announced on 6 March 2023 by the KTK channel to be held on 10 March in all its livestream platforms, to which the televised debate consisted of three stages starting with the party participants presenting their theses of the election programs, asking each other questions, and in the final stage making appeal to the voters. During the debate, People's Party of Kazakhstan (QHP) chairman Ermukhamet Ertisbaev made a notable proposal in forming a coalition government alongside the parties of Auyl and Baytaq.

The Central Election Commission (CEC) on 27 February 2023 had scheduled its third pre-election debate to take place on 16 March 2023, to which approximately 63 million tenge was allocated towards the hosting Khabar Agency for its televised debates between party representatives. On 7 March, the CEC approved a list of participants representing the parties at the podium, which initially included QHP chairman Ertisbaev as an invitee, but instead later having QHP member Oksana Äubäkirova representing the party. During the debate, consisting of three rounds, the speakers introduced their party ideologies, asked questions to their opponents, discussed party policies for developing Kazakhstan's socioeconomic status, and answered questions from the Khabar Agency's cell center, with the third and final round concluding with addresses from each party representative.

A debate consisting of independent candidates in a YouTube livestream were also hosted by the Orda.kz on 3 March 2023.

2023 Kazakh legislative election debates
Date and time	Organisers	Location	Language(s)	Moderator(s)	P Present (Note: Denotes an official party leader.) R Representative							Duration	Source
Date and time	Organisers	Location	Language(s)	Moderator(s)	Amanat	Auyl	Aq Jol	QHP	Respublica	JSDP	Baytaq	Duration	Source
1 March 2023; 20:30	Qazaqstan	Astana	Kazakh	Armangül Toqtamurat	R Beisenbaev	R Dairabaev	R Düisembinov	R Asylbekov	R Tau	R Äuesbaev	P Ämirtaev	1:25:33	
10 March 2023; 21:00	KTK	Almaty	Kazakh, Russian	Evgenia Säkenova	R Sarym	R Dairabaev	R Espaeva	P Ertisbaev	R Şükijanova	P Raqymjanov	R Säbitova	2:02:22	
16 March 2023; 20:00	Khabar Agency	Astana	Kazakh, Russian	Aigül Ädilova; Darhan Äbduahit	P Qoşanov	R Dairabaev	P Peruashev	R Äubäkirova	P Hodjanazarov	R Äuesbaev	P Ämirtaev	2:30:13	

Opinion polls

During an online survey conducted in the 10 March 2023 debate, a majority of KTK channel respondents viewed Amanat to be the general winner of all the participating parties.

Party viewed as most liked in the debate
Debate	Polling firm	Amanat	Auyl	Aq Jol	QHP	Respublica	JSDP	Baytaq	None	Respondents
10 March 2023	Public Opinion Research Institute	59.0%	4.4%	8.5%	2.9%	15.0%	4.7%	2.4%	5.3%	21,000

== Opinion polls ==
Opinion polling in Kazakhstan may only be conducted by legal firms that are registered in accordance with the law of having at least five years of experience in conducting public surveys and had notified the Central Election Commission (CEC) of the polling firm's specialists and their experience along with the locations where they are conducted, and the analysis methods used. It is prohibited for pollsters to publish opinion survey results on the internet regarding the election of candidates and political parties five days before voting begins (from 14 March 2023) as well as on election day at premises or in polling stations.

In addition, independent polling is severely restricted in Kazakhstan, as Deputy Prosecutor General Jandos Ömiräliev on 18 February 2023 reported a number of unauthorised conducts of opinion polls, including one individual being fined under the decision by the prosecutor of Saryarqa District in Astana. Änuarbek Sqaqov, member of the Kazakhstan Union of Lawyers central council, argued that public opinion should be done so without conducting online polls on social media and instead be carried out only by certain organisations accredited with the CEC, to which he insisted that it would supposedly prevent the "abuse or manipulation of public opinion".

Political scientist Talğat Qaliev forecast that the ruling Amanat party would retain its party of power status in the 2023 election due to its "extensive network of branches" and prominent political figures in the party, followed by the Auyl party within the second place of the vote in which he cited the party's electorate support from a large-sized rural base.

Polling firm	Fieldwork date	Sample size	Margin of error	Amanat	Auyl	Aq Jol	QHP	Respublica	JSDP	Baytaq	Against all	Undecided
Public Opinion Research Institute	3–10 March 2023	2,000	± 1.1%	66.7%	6.1%	5.2%	5.1%	5.4%	4.1%	2.1%	5.3%	7.6%
Strategy	17–27 February 2023	1,600	± 3.0%	43.6%	9.9%	11.3%	6.3%	6.2%	2.4%	1.4%	3.6%	12.7%
Democratic Institute	3–18 February 2023	8,000	± 1.1%	58.4%	5.1%	5.4%	5.2%	4.2%	3.9%	1.8%	2.2%	13.8%
Public Opinion Research Institute	25–28 January 2023	1,200	± 2.8%	48.6%	6.2%	5.4%	4.8%	3.6%	3.2%	2.8%	2.6%	22.8%

=== Exit polls ===
During election day, exit polls are conducted by members from legal organisations within and outside the premises of polling stations, to which Janar Muqanova, head of the Centre for Electoral Training of the Academy of Public Administration under the President, argued that a registration barrier provides a "good management" in professionally conducting sociological surveys. Organisations conducting exit polls publish their results after election day and within 12 hours after the announcements of preliminary results by the CEC.

After midnight on 20 March 2023, exit polls reported by Kazakh media indicated that the ruling Amanat party had won the majority of the vote share. Analysts forecasted that around five or six other parties would earn representation after surpassing the electoral threshold, with the opposition Nationwide Social Democratic Party on the uncertain edge of the threshold barrier. As the only party contesting the election but not surpassing the threshold, Baytaq was viewed to have no chances of entering the parliament.

Polling firm	Sample size	Amanat	Auyl	Aq Jol	QHP	Respublica	JSDP	Baytaq	Against all	Turnout
Institute of Eurasian Integration	30,000	53.3%	10.5%	7.9%	6.3%	9.9%	5.3%	3.2%	4.5%	53.3%
SOTSIS-A	312,000	54.4%	10.2%	8.2%	6.9%	8.8%	4.9%	2.2%	4.4%	55.6%
Democratic Institute	12,000	53.3%	11.3%	8.9%	5.1%	8.3%	5.1%	2.5%	3.7%	54.8%

== Results ==
In the early morning of 20 March 2023, the Central Election Commission (CEC) announced the preliminary election results summed up from electronic copies of the voting result protocols by the territorial and district election commissions. From there, the ruling Amanat party had officially won majority of 53.9% of the proportional vote share, marking it one of the worst performances for the party since the 1999 legislative election. In the constituencies, the preliminary results showed the Amanat party winning an overwhelming majority of 22 seats (+1 independent candidate affiliated with the party) out of a total of 29 contested seats, leaving the rest of seven mandates to be won by independents in their representing electoral districts.

The final results of the 2023 legislative election were published by the CEC on 27 March 2023, revealing the upcoming seating composition of the 8th Majilis according to party-list, with the ruling Amanat party winning 40 seats, followed by Auyl with 8 seats, Respublica and Aq Jol with 6 seats each, the People's Party of Kazakhstan (QHP) with 5 seats, and the self-declared opposition Nationwide Social Democratic Party (JSDP) secured 4 seats, while Baytaq failed to surpass the 5% electoral threshold.

Party	Party-list			Constituency			Total seats	+/–
Party	Votes	%	Seats	Votes	%	Seats	Total seats	+/–
Amanat	3,431,510	53.90	40	2,886,468	45.67	22	62	–14
Auyl People's Democratic Patriotic Party	693,938	10.90	8	79,045	1.25	0	8	+8
Respublica	547,154	8.59	6	9,497	0.15	0	6	New
Aq Jol	535,139	8.41	6	121,069	1.92	0	6	–6
People's Party of Kazakhstan	432,920	6.80	5	87,803	1.39	0	5	–5
Nationwide Social Democratic Party	331,058	5.20	4	31,702	0.50	0	4	New
Baytaq Green Party of Kazakhstan	146,431	2.30	0	17,166	0.27	0	0	New
Russian Community of Kazakhstan				7,957	0.13	0	0	New
Veterans of the GSFG and Group of Warsaw Pact Forces				5,043	0.08	0	0	New
Astana City Veterans of the Nagorno-Karabakh conflict				3,585	0.06	0	0	New
Federation of Kazakhstani Motorists				1,569	0.02	0	0	New
Independents				2,820,810	44.63	7	7	New
Against all	248,291	3.90	–	248,283	3.93	–	–	–
Total	6,366,441	100.00	69	6,319,997	100.00	29	98	–9
Valid votes	6,366,441	97.58		6,319,997	99.06			
Invalid/blank votes	158,046	2.42		60,227	0.94			
Total votes	6,524,487	100.00		6,380,224	100.00			
Registered voters/turnout	12,035,578	54.21		12,023,562	53.06			
Source: CEC CEC Nomad.su

=== Voter turnout ===
Region	Time						
Region	10:00	12:00	14:00	16:00	18:00	20:00	22:00
Kazakhstan	1,710,381 (14.21%)	3,687,608 (30.65%)	5,635,462 (46.84%)	6,254,837 (51.98%)	6,390,046 (53.11%)	6,509,695 (54.09%)	6,521,860 (54.19%)
Abai Region	15.13%	33.58%	52.28%	55.23%	56.14%	57.02%	57.02%
Akmola Region	15.61%	33.63%	52.12%	58.96%	59.49%	60.01%	60.01%
Aktobe Region	12.44%	33.18%	51.28%	56.32%	56.88%	57.45%	58.00%
Almaty Region	15.32%	34.41%	52.13%	59.45%	59.74%	60.03%	60.03%
Atyrau Region	12.94%	30.66%	36.15%	48.15%	49.19%	50.22%	51.23%
West Kazakhstan Region	12.96%	33.61%	55.14%	58.61%	58.81%	59.01%	59.20%
Jambyl Region	16.54%	35.82%	58.32%	64.78%	65.00%	65.21%	65.21%
Jetisu Region	15.93%	33.15%	52.41%	54.82%	55.07%	55.32%	55.32%
Karaganda Region	16.31%	34.19%	56.97%	58.21%	58.85%	59.48%	59.48%
Kostanay Region	16.23%	37.39%	62.36%	64.81%	65.00%	65.10%	65.10%
Kyzylorda Region	12.64%	32.78%	54.31%	64.95%	65.70%	66.46%	67.21%
Mangystau Region	12.36%	32.43%	49.18%	53.84%	54.04%	54.08%	54.10%
Pavlodar Region	16.49%	34.26%	51.24%	58.43%	58.61%	58.68%	58.68%
North Kazakhstan Region	15.93%	32.81%	49.68%	63.66%	64.46%	65.25%	65.25%
Turkistan Region	15.62%	38.29%	48.37%	49.14%	51.07%	53.01%	53.01%
Ulytau Region	16.38%	34.61%	52.29%	58.26%	58.63%	58.99%	58.99%
East Kazakhstan Region	16.11%	34.16%	58.69%	63.09%	63.63%	64.15%	64.15%
Astana	13.58%	23.35%	33.65%	38.57%	40.94%	42.91%	42.91%
Almaty	8.51%	11.25%	15.38%	19.14%	22.95%	25.82%	25.82%
Shymkent	12.57%	19.63%	35.61%	42.31%	43.89%	45.46%	45.46%

=== Results by region ===
==== Constituency vote ====
Results by constituency
Constituency			Elected deputy				Runner-up
Region	No.	Total seats	Candidate	Party	Votes	%	Runner-up
Astana	1	2	Däulet Turlyhanov	Amanat	71,698	47.03%	Täñirbergen Berdoñğarov, Independent; 11.20% (17,079 votes)
Astana	2	2	Däulet Muqaev	Independent	51,769	29.51%	Arman Şoraev, Independent; 18.05% (31,669 votes)
Almaty	3	3	Ermurat Bapi	Independent	23,690	27.93%	Inga Imanbai, Independent (QDP); 8.01% (6,798 votes)
Almaty	4	3	Erlan Stambekov	Independent	15,930	20.66%	Sanjar Boqaev, Independent (Namys); 15.12% (11,660 votes)
Almaty	5	3	Baqytjan Bazarbek	Independent (Amanat)	22,685	21.59%	Muhtar Taijan, Independent (Jer Qorgany); 12.26% (12,882 votes)
Shymkent	6	2	Danabek Isabekov	Amanat	21,098	36.80%	Ğalymjan Äbişev, Independent; 14.70% (8,430 votes)
Shymkent	7	2	Bolatbek Najmetdinuly	Amanat	19,851	21.06%	Abai Praliev, Independent; 18.37% (17,319 votes)
Abai Region	8	1	Nurtai Sabilianov	Amanat	131,872	58.02%	Ashat Januzaqov, Independent; 12.69% (28,841 votes)
Akmola Region	9	1	Aina Mysyrälimova	Amanat	154,587	50.72%	Arman Berdalin, Independent; 13.68% (41,708 votes)
Aktobe Region	10	1	Qazybek Älişev	Amanat	238,195	74.51%	Tättigül Talaeva, Independent; 5.42% (17,326 votes)
Almaty Region	11	2	Ardaq Nazarov	Independent	122,242	38.24%	Rysbek Särsenbai, Independent (Bizdin Tandau); 13.63% (43,565 votes)
Almaty Region	12	2	Daniar Qasqaraurov	Independent	153,225	63.76%	Sydyq Däuletov, Amanat; 21.69% (71,071 votes)
Atyrau Region	13	1	Ädil Jubanov	Amanat	107,973	53.19%	Särsenbai Eñsegenov, Independent; 19.80% (40,185 votes)
West Kazakhstan Region	14	1	Abzal Quspan	Independent	126,784	50.22%	Luqpan Ahmediarov, Independent; 18.29% (46,172 votes)
Jambyl Region	15	2	Muqaş Eskendirov	Amanat	99,021	48.15%	Serik Sälemov, Independent; 34.88% (71,719 votes)
Jambyl Region	16	2	Güldara Nurymova	Amanat	190,078	74.89%	Mädina Jatqanbaeva, Aq Jol; 10.49% (26,628 votes)
Jetisu Region	17	1	Ruslan Qojasbaev	Amanat	132,678	55.81%	Saiat Niusupov, Independent; 7.63% (18,135 votes)
Karaganda Region	18	2	Qudaibergen Beksultanov	Amanat	132,471	60.26%	Mahmut Älipbergenov, QHP; 14.24% (31,306 votes)
Karaganda Region	19	2	Arman Qalyqov	Amanat	145,228	63.84%	Rauan Şaekin, Independent; 10.49% (23,864 votes)
Kostanay Region	20	1	Erkin Äbil	Amanat	192,175	54.17%	Berikjan Qaiypbai, Auyl; 7.33% (26,002 votes)
Kyzylorda Region	21	1	Marhabat Jaiymbetov	Amanat	148,646	31.11%	Säbit Päzilov, Independent; 18.77% (89,697 votes)
Mangystau Region	22	1	Edil Jañbyrşin	Amanat	117,880	52.60%	Qaiyrbek Maqulov, Independent; 20.93% (46,909 votes)
Pavlodar Region	23	1	Jarkynbek Amantai	Amanat	168,625	56.69%	Rysty Jumabekova, Independent; 13.11% (39,001 votes)
North Kazakhstan Region	24	1	Erkebulan Mämbetov	Amanat	153,736	63.73%	Oleg Ivanov, Independent; 10.13% (24,436 votes)
Turkistan Region	25	3	Qairat Balabiev	Amanat	142,595	73.50%	Hudaişuqyr Abdullaev, Independent; 15.88% (30,811 votes)
Turkistan Region	26	3	Ulasbek Sädibekov	Amanat	92,445	54.45%	Jasur Momynjanov, Independent; 17.44% (29,602 votes)
Turkistan Region	27	3	Temir Qyryqbaev	Amanat	117,584	54.87%	Nūrjan Ältaev, Independent (El Tıregı); 16.39% (35,116 votes)
Ulytau Region	28	1	Erbolat Satybaldin	Amanat	44,406	55.95%	Dulat Süleimenov, Independent; 10.10% (8,016 votes)
East Kazakhstan Region	29	1	Luqbek Tumaşinov	Amanat	165,596	54.99%	Sergei Bogolomov, Independent; 6.51% (19,609 votes)

==== Party-list vote ====
Party-list results by region
Region	Registered voters	Amanat		Auyl		Respublica		Aq Jol		QHP		JSDP		Baytaq		Against all		Invalid/ blank	Total	
Region	Registered voters	Votes	%	Votes	%	Votes	%	Votes	%	Votes	%	Votes	%	Votes	%	Votes	%	Invalid/ blank	Votes	%
Abai Region	416,191	158,103	67.81%	13,919	5.97%	14,199	6.09%	9,000	3.86%	15,528	6.66%	11,285	4.84%	1,562	0.67%	9,559	4.10%	4,143	237,298	57.02%
Aqmola Region	517,816	204,078	69.51%	19,289	6.57%	15,414	5.25%	10,980	3.74%	18,027	6.14%	5,960	2.03%	8,103	2.76%	11,744	4.00%	17,161	310,756	60.01%
Aqtöbe Region	562,698	143,763	44.95%	48,198	15.07%	20,885	6.53%	43,624	13.64%	16,855	5.27%	17,654	5.52%	12,921	4.04%	15,927	4.98%	6,537	326,364	58.00%
Almaty Region	966,304	313,949	55.03%	51,007	8.94%	47,643	8.35%	43,561	7.64%	38,428	6.74%	29,324	5.14%	19,649	3.44%	26,901	4.72%	9,610	580,072	60.03%
Atyrau Region	412,382	92,484	44.30%	26,764	12.82%	39,290	18.82%	20,877	10.00%	9,708	4.65%	8,163	3.91%	3,967	1.90%	7,516	3.60%	2,494	211,263	51.23%
West Kazakhstan Region	442,446	128,081	49.85%	26,567	10.34%	17,189	6.69%	34,378	13.38%	20,914	8.14%	14,465	5.63%	2,312	0.90%	13,027	5.07%	4,995	261,928	59.20%
Jambyl Region	717,116	206,250	44.89%	80,773	17.58%	57,157	12.44%	55,503	12.08%	18,608	4.05%	17,643	3.84%	8,684	1.89%	14,840	3.23%	8,173	467,631	65.21%
Jetisu Region	443,617	107,413	44.67%	32,005	13.31%	45,254	18.82%	21,882	9.10%	9,186	3.82%	9,642	4.01%	5,531	2.30%	9,546	3.97%	4,949	245,408	55.32%
Qarağandy Region	761,673	231,756	52.15%	28,531	6.42%	81,148	18.26%	30,442	6.85%	31,686	7.13%	18,221	4.10%	7,022	1.58%	15,599	3.51%	8,638	453,043	59.48%
Qostanai Region	554,741	226,607	63.91%	37,797	10.66%	21,806	6.15%	25,848	7.29%	14,360	4.05%	16,098	4.54%	4,716	1.33%	7,340	2.07%	6,558	361,130	65.10%
Qyzylorda Region	486,034	175,664	54.84%	39,976	12.48%	25,764	8.04%	27,121	8.47%	9,962	3.11%	16,625	5.19%	12,685	3.96%	12,525	3.91%	6,341	326,663	67.21%
Mangystau Region	418,123	68,294	30.75%	23,343	10.51%	35,292	15.89%	32,560	14.66%	14,703	6.62%	23,409	10.54%	13,704	6.17%	10,794	4.86%	4,103	226,202	54.10%
Pavlodar Region	512,343	199,160	67.33%	9,998	3.38%	12,660	4.28%	14,464	4.89%	35,555	12.02%	10,471	3.54%	4,792	1.62%	8,696	2.94%	4,856	300,652	58.68%
North Kazakhstan Region	384,148	121,900	52.13%	18,800	8.04%	8,558	3.66%	46,042	19.69%	15,737	6.73%	6,781	2.90%	7,226	3.09%	8,792	3.76%	16,820	250,656	65.25%
Türkistan Region	1,168,728	293,134	48.86%	140,322	23.39%	12,897	2.15%	28,010	4.67%	55,765	9.30%	51,223	8.54%	7,401	1.23%	11,151	1.86%	19,588	619,491	53.01%
Ulytau Region	141,312	52,417	63.94%	6,919	8.44%	2,320	2.83%	5,861	7.15%	6,075	7.41%	4,394	5.36%	1,008	1.23%	2,984	3.64%	1,381	83,359	58.99%
East Kazakhstan Region	499,206	183,902	58.46%	50,238	15.97%	23,688	7.53%	16,484	5.24%	11,702	3.72%	13,716	4.36%	2,800	0.89%	12,048	3.83%	5,662	320,240	64.15%
Astana	788,931	186,496	55.91%	17,445	5.23%	24,283	7.28%	32,055	9.61%	34,957	10.48%	17,579	5.27%	5,137	1.54%	15,611	4.68%	7,555	341,118	42.91%
Almaty	1,202,078	150,312	50.33%	14,604	4.89%	29,208	9.78%	19,203	6.43%	33,688	11.28%	19,144	6.41%	13,887	4.65%	18,606	6.23%	11,764	310,416	25.82%
Shymkent	639,691	187,747	66.09%	7,443	2.62%	12,499	4.40%	17,244	6.07%	21,476	7.56%	19,261	6.78%	3,324	1.17%	15,085	5.31%	6,718	290,797	45.46%
Kazakhstan	12,035,578	3,431,510	53.90%	693,938	10.90%	547,154	8.59%	535,139	8.41%	432,920	6.80%	331,058	5.20%	146,431	2.30%	248.291	3.90%	158,046	6,524,487	54.21%

== Aftermath ==
In a speech given during the Nowruz celebration event in Astana on 21 March 2023, President Kassym-Jomart Tokayev praised the results of the legislative election as being "a very important step forward for all reforms" and "a worthy continuation of large-scale changes", marking personally that Kazakhstan had "entered a new era" with its newly formed political image as part of his successfully implemented one-year political reform plan, while completely ignoring reports of widespread electoral fraud allegations. Tokayev described the election as being a "historic moment" symbolising the "Great Day of the Nation".

=== Analysis ===
The 2023 election marked a shift in the national political landscape of Kazakhstan in post-Nazarbayev era, as the ruling Amanat party lost its supermajority status and was left with a simple majority for the first time since 2004 after losing 14 seats, with other contesting parties such as Auyl and Respublica emerging as the main frontrunning minor parties after entering the parliament and overtaking Aq Jol and QHP as the major minor parties in the election (which had held their statuses since previously entering the Mäjilis in 2012). For the first time since 2004, independent candidates as well as politicians affiliated with opposition JSDP were also elected to the parliament. Despite the outlook of the election results, the status of JSDP as an opposition party was met with skepticism, particularly according to Mikhail Rozov from Ritm Eurasia, who described the JSDP as being an opposition party only with "a very big stretch". Ainur Kurmanov, leader of the banned Socialist Movement of Kazakhstan, claimed that the newly composed 8th Mäjilis would be "the most national-populist and Russophobic parliament in the entire history of Kazakhstan" that could lead to legislation such as strengthening ethnocracy and decommunization through the use "rehabilitation of the lists of Basmachi, Nazi collaborators and traitors to the motherland", as well as derussification through the "renaming of settlements and the adoption of corresponding new laws."

Various pro-government commentators praised the elections in a positive outlook. Political scientist Talgat Qaliev from the Institute of Ethno-Political Studies, believed that the election results would increase the "level of pluralism". Erlan Ahmedi, political scientist and chief expert of the Institute of Public Policy, described the 2023 election as being "unusual", voicing his belief on the continued process of democratization in Kazakhstan and predicting that the next legislative and presidential elections scheduled for 2028 and 2029, respectively, would be "even more interesting".

The legislative election results were also met with varied forms of skepticism and doubts. Political scientist Dosym Sätbaev had consistently described the election results as being a "political hoax" with the ruling Amanat party's victory as being intentionally pre-planned in parr with "Aqorda's script", and that the parliamentary elections were part of the chain of events that occurred since the January 2022 unrest, as any possibilities of an aftermath political reform had been "finally slammed shut". Sätbaev also did not rule out claims of the election results being falsified. Shalkar Nurseitov, a political analyst and director of the Center for Policy Solutions in Kazakhstan, had asserted that aftermath of the legislative election "sends a message to the elites and the international community" in completion of President Tokayev's concentration of power in his hands. Raqym Oşaqbaev, economist and director of the Center for Applied Research TALAP, suggested that the newly elected parliament would not change as it would be continued to be in control by the "influence of the pro-government bureaucratic nomenclature", fearing that Kazakhstan is doomed to "further degradation and aggravation of the crisis". Catherine Putz from The Diplomat, noted the low electoral turnout as being an indication of "lack of enthusiasm" amongst Kazakh voters and raised concerns regarding the legislative work done by newly elected independents as well as potentially unified parliamentary opposition against the ruling Amanat party, to which she expressed doubts that any of minor parties in the Mäjilis would challenge the "status quo" and that the parliament overall would "resemble its former self".

Alexander Kireev, creator of the Electoral Geography project, expressed concerns over the official election results that exhibited a pattern of consistently high percentages of votes received by each party ending in repeating decimals rounded to hundredths (ex. 53.900% of votes for Amanat), to which Kireev suggested that this pattern of election results as well as voter turnout number could be an indication that the votes were not based on tallies from local precincts, but instead were fabricated separately by an unknown entity.

=== Election results complaints and lawsuits ===
On 19 March 2023, independent opposition candidates Muhtar Taijan and Sanjar Boqaev filed lawsuits to the Almaty administrative court, requesting the election results to be declared as illegal. In a following press conference held on 20 March, Taijan as well as Mäjilis candidate Inga Imanbai expressed their dissatisfaction with the official results, alleging of election irregularities. Imanbai announced her intent to challenge the election results, accusing Kazakh authorities of rigging votes in favour of her challenger, Ermurat Bapi. She alleged that the authorities covered up the ballot boxes, urged public servants to vote for specific candidates, and claimed her campaign observers were facing pressure and were removed from polling stations. Erlan Stambekov, an official winner for Electoral district No. 4 of Almaty, was presumably shown to have actually taken only third place in the results within the constituency according to his losing candidate, Boqaev, who claimed of processing voting result protocols sent via WhatsApp that showed him winning the race with 4,459 votes compared to 2,825 votes cast for Stambekov. In Shymkent and Turkistan Region, a group of independent candidates, most notably Nūrjan Ältaev, had also sought to challenge the results of the election, to which they demanded re-election and requested President Tokayev to intervene in the issue. Ältaev, in possession of numerous voting protocol records from his electoral district, argued that he had received majority of 35,178 votes in comparison to his official winning rival, Temir Qyryqbaev, who garnered 32,251 votes. Independent Mäjilis candidate Luqpan Ahmediarov from West Kazakhstan Region, criticised the election results after losing to Abzal Quspan in Electoral district No. 14, to which election protocols collected in Oral by the Jaria public fund observers, had shown Ahmediarov winning 14,816 of votes contrary to Quspan's 8,922 votes. In response, Ahmediarov announced that he would appeal the official results of the vote. Marina Shiller, Aq Jol candidate in Karaganda Region, support the idea of holding a re-election as she claimed of receiving lots of personal contacts from residents that claimed to have voted for her in the election. Candidate Qalibek Qalioldanov launched a petition challenging the election results as illegitimate, requesting President Tokayev's intervention, which had gathered around 5,000 signatures by late March.

Despite numerous complaints over the election results, most lawsuits were dismissed on procedural grounds. The courts processed around 400–473 cases by 31 March 2023. Many were rejected due to missed deadlines, lack of standing, filing errors, or because precinct protocols were not considered appealable. Administrative courts resolved challenges quickly, and the Supreme Court upheld most lower court and commission decisions by late March, allowing the new Mäjilis to convene on schedule. Appeals to the Constitutional Court largely did not proceed, as many submissions fell outside its jurisdiction or did not meet admissibility criteria. In May 2023, the Supreme Court dismissed appeals by candidates Boqaev and Murat Adam, citing procedural issues, including authority to represent each other and filing deadlines, and noted that some matters fell within the competence of the election commissions rather than the courts. Following the dismissal, the candidates did not rule out plans to appeal to the Constitutional Court and, if necessary, to the UN Human Rights Council.

Despite widespread allegations and legal disputes over the election results from journalists and public figures, Bulat Abilov expressed doubt in a potential election audit in a Deutsche Welle interview, suggesting that it would only result in the punishment or reassignment of some election officials. Daniar Äşimbaev, a political analyst, also expressed doubts about the possibility of an audit and any potential consequences for President Tokayev's reputation as he cited the election losses for government critics.

=== Opening of the 8th Parliament and government formation ===
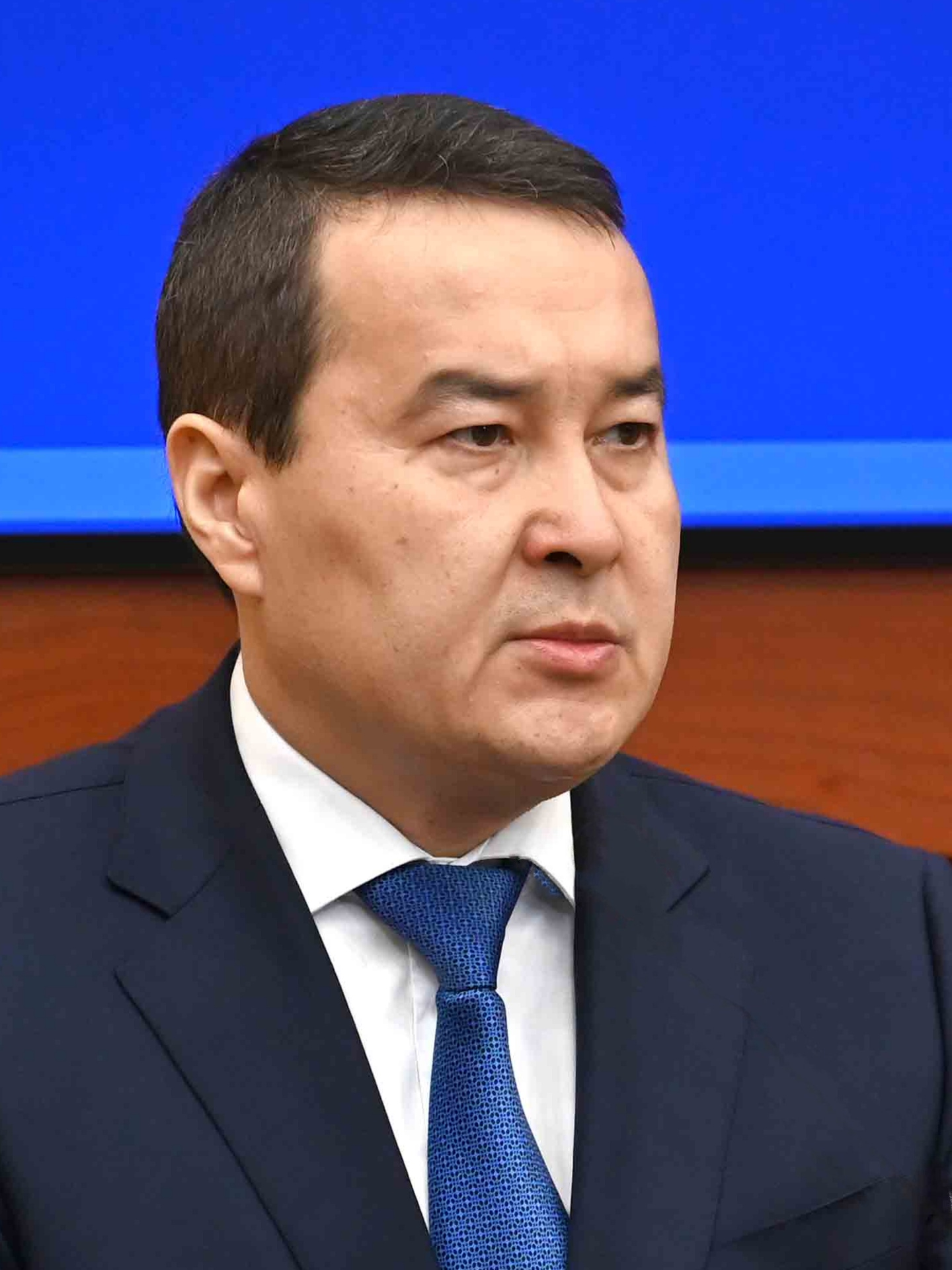
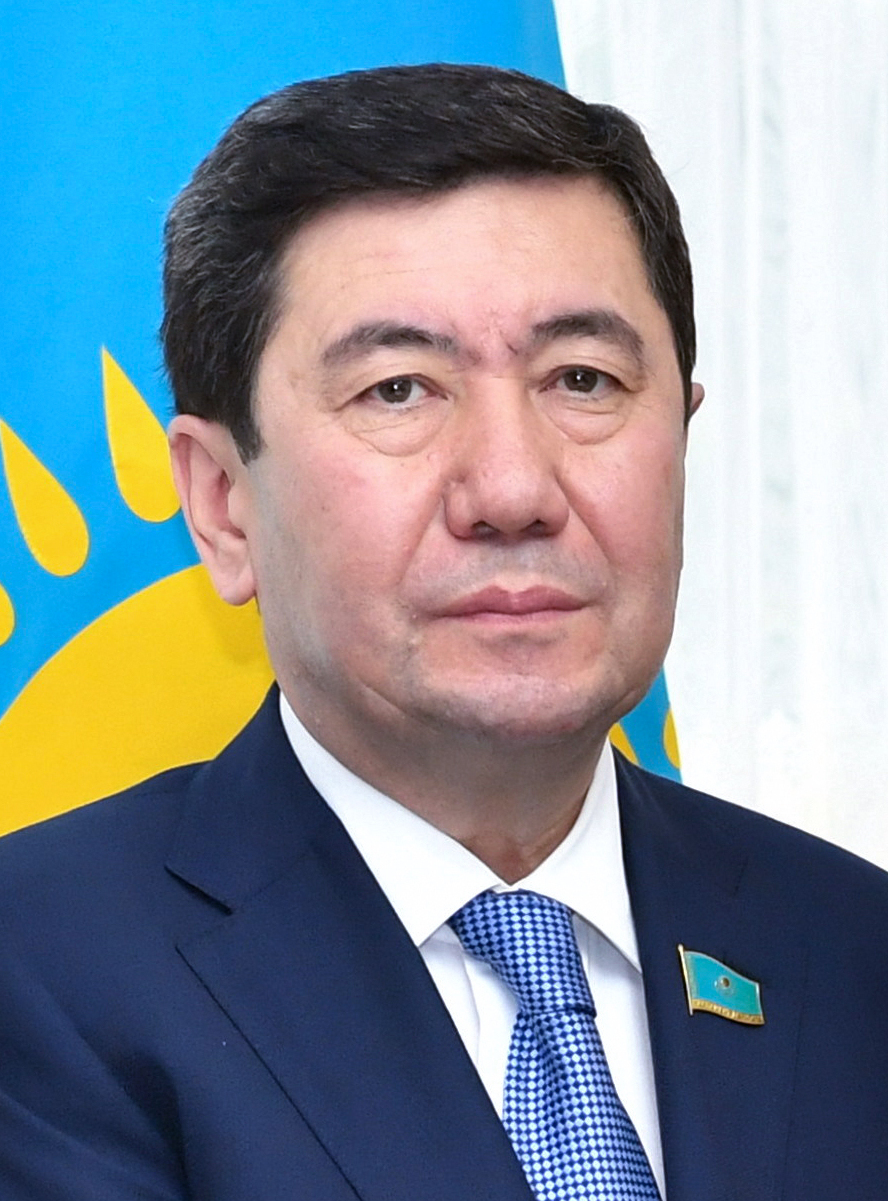
Prime Minister Älihan Smaiylov (left) and Mäjilis chairman Erlan Qoşanov (right) both retained their incumbency posts following the 2023 legislative election.

Under the 2017 amendment adopted during Nursultan Nazarbayev's presidency, Article 67(4) of the Constitution of Kazakhstan obliges the Prime Minister and his cabinet to resign in advance of the newly elected Mäjilis for the 8th Parliament of Kazakhstan. Prime Minister Älihan Smaiylov on 19 March 2023 announced that his cabinet would step down after the election. On 27 March, President Tokayev signed a decree in convening the first session of the 8th Mäjilis for 29 March.

On 29 March 2023, at the first plenary session of the 8th Parliament, Amanat party chairman and deputy Erlan Qoşanov was reappointed as the Mäjilis chairman in a unanimous vote, with MPs of Albert Rau (Amanat) and Dania Espaeva (Aq Jol) being elected to serve as his deputies. From there, the First Smaiylov Government resigned, leading for President Tokayev in appointing a caretaker government with Smaiylov serving as acting prime minister. Qoşanov at a following press briefing revealed that the party faction of Amanat would nominate its prime ministerial candidate in the "coming days". Speculations arose during Smaiylov's short tenure as prime minister about his chances of staying in the position, with political scientist Andrei Chebotarev noting that Smaiylov began his premiership by stabilizing Kazakhstan after the January 2022 unrest but the list of potential replacements was small, and also pointed out Tokayev's new agenda and previous criticisms of the government as factors contributing to the uncertainty surrounding Smaiylov's future.

The following day on 30 March 2023, Qoşanov in a meeting with Tokayev unveiled Smaiylov's candidacy by the Amanat party for his reappointment as prime minister. From there, Tokayev held talks with the party faction leaders of Mäjilis, where Tokayev endorsed Smaiylov for prime ministerial post, stating his awareness of "challenges facing the government". Smaiylov's candidacy was supported by an overwhelming majority of Mäjilis deputies, with seven voting against, most notably from the Nationwide Social Democratic Party parliamentary group. As a result of the parliamentary vote, Tokayev signed a decree in officially reappointing Smaiylov as the prime minister, thus leading to a formation of the Second Smaiylov Government. Under changes following subsequent cabinet ministerial appointments, the government composition featured two (or 8.6%) new ministers out of 23 cabinet officials.

== See also ==
- 2022 Kazakh constitutional referendum
- 2023 Kazakh local elections
- List of Mäjilis members of the 8th Parliament of Kazakhstan
