= Kazakhstan's 13th electoral district =

Single-mandate territorial constituency in Kazakhstan

Electoral district No. 13
- Kazakh: №13 сайлау округі Russian: Избирательный округ №13
- Single-mandate constituency for the Mäjilis
- Region: Aktobe Region (2004–2007); Atyrau Region (2022–present)
- Population: 696,293 (2023)
- Electorate: 412,382 (2023)
- Major settlements: Atyrau (seat)

Current constituency
- Created: 2004; 2022 (re-established)
- Seats: 1
- Party: Amanat
- Deputy: Ädil Jubanov
- Elected: 2023

The Electoral district No. 13 (Kazakh: №13 сайлау округі, romanized: №13 sailau okrugı; Russian: Избирательный округ №13) is a single-mandate territorial constituency in Kazakhstan, represented in the lower chamber Mäjilis of the Parliament. It covers the entirety of Atyrau Region, including all its regional districts, with its seat being centered in Atyrau.

The constituency was originally formed for the 2004 legislative election and existed until being abolished in 2007. However, it has been reestablished in 2022 and is currently represented by deputy Ädil Jubanov (Amanat) since March 2023.

== Geography ==
The Electoral district No. 13 situated in the territory of Atyrau Region, and its administrative center, Atyrau, serves as the seat of the constituency. The electoral district shares borders with No. 14 (West Kazakhstan Region) to the north, No. 10 (Aktobe Region) to the east, and No. 22 (Mangystau Region) to the south.

== History ==
The Electoral district No. 13 was formed for the 2004 legislative election as a result of redistribution originally within the boundaries of Aktobe Region, and Bolat Äbişev served as deputy from the constituency. From there, the electoral district continued to exist until its dissolution following the 2007 constitutional amendment, which led to the abolition of all constituencies as part of the transition from a mixed-member majoritarian representation to a fully party-list proportional representation system. The change affected the composition of all seats in the lower chamber Mäjilis of the Kazakh Parliament beginning with the 2007 legislative election.

On 24 December 2022, the Electoral district No. 13 was reestablished by the Central Election Commission in the territory of Atyrau Region, which came into effect on 1 January 2023 as a result of the 2022 amendment. The adoption of this amendment marked the reintroduction of a mixed electoral system for electing Mäjilis deputies, with the use of numbered constituencies being reinstated for the first time since 2004. It made its debut in the 2023 legislative election, with Ädil Jubanov becoming the elected representative of the constituency.

== Deputies ==
Election	Member	Party	%	Representing region
2004	Bolat Äbişev	Independent	77.7	Aqtöbe Region
2007	Defunct (Single-nationwide PR constituency)			
2012	Defunct (Single-nationwide PR constituency)			
2016	Defunct (Single-nationwide PR constituency)			
2021	Defunct (Single-nationwide PR constituency)			
2023	Ädil Jubanov	Amanat	46.7	Atyrau Region

== Election results ==
=== 2023 ===
Candidate	Party	Votes	%
Ädil Jubanov	Amanat	107,973	53.19
Särsenbai Esengenov	Independent	40,185	19.80
Irak Elekeev	Independent	15,212	7.49
Musa Harilliev	Independent	10,916	5.38
Sanduğaş Kukenova	Independent	8,051	3.97
Nurtas Baijanov	Auyl	5,843	2.88
Olesya Vertinskaya	Independent	5,797	2.86
Nurainaş Kamalova	Nationwide Social Democratic Party	3,319	1.64
Lauera Ahmetjan	Independent	1,201	0.59
Gülzada Netqalieva	Independent	855	0.42
Murat Ğubaidüllin	Independent	735	0.36
Against all		2,900	1.43
Total		202,987	100.00
Valid votes		202,987	99.35
Invalid/blank votes		1,318	0.65
Total votes		204,305	100.00
Registered voters/turnout		412,382	49.54
Amanat gain			
Source: CEC
