= 2023 Kazakh local elections =

- 19 March 2023

All 3,415 seats to 223 mäslihats (local assemblies)
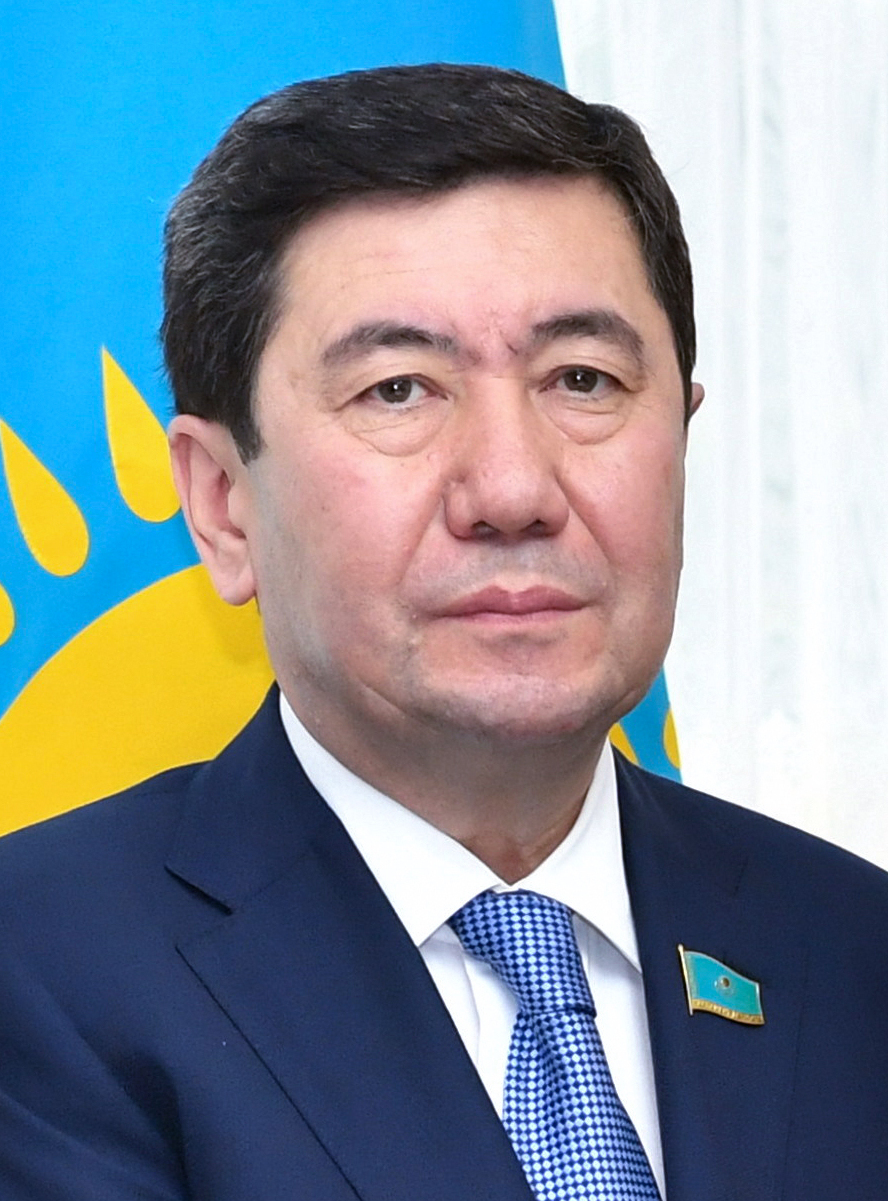

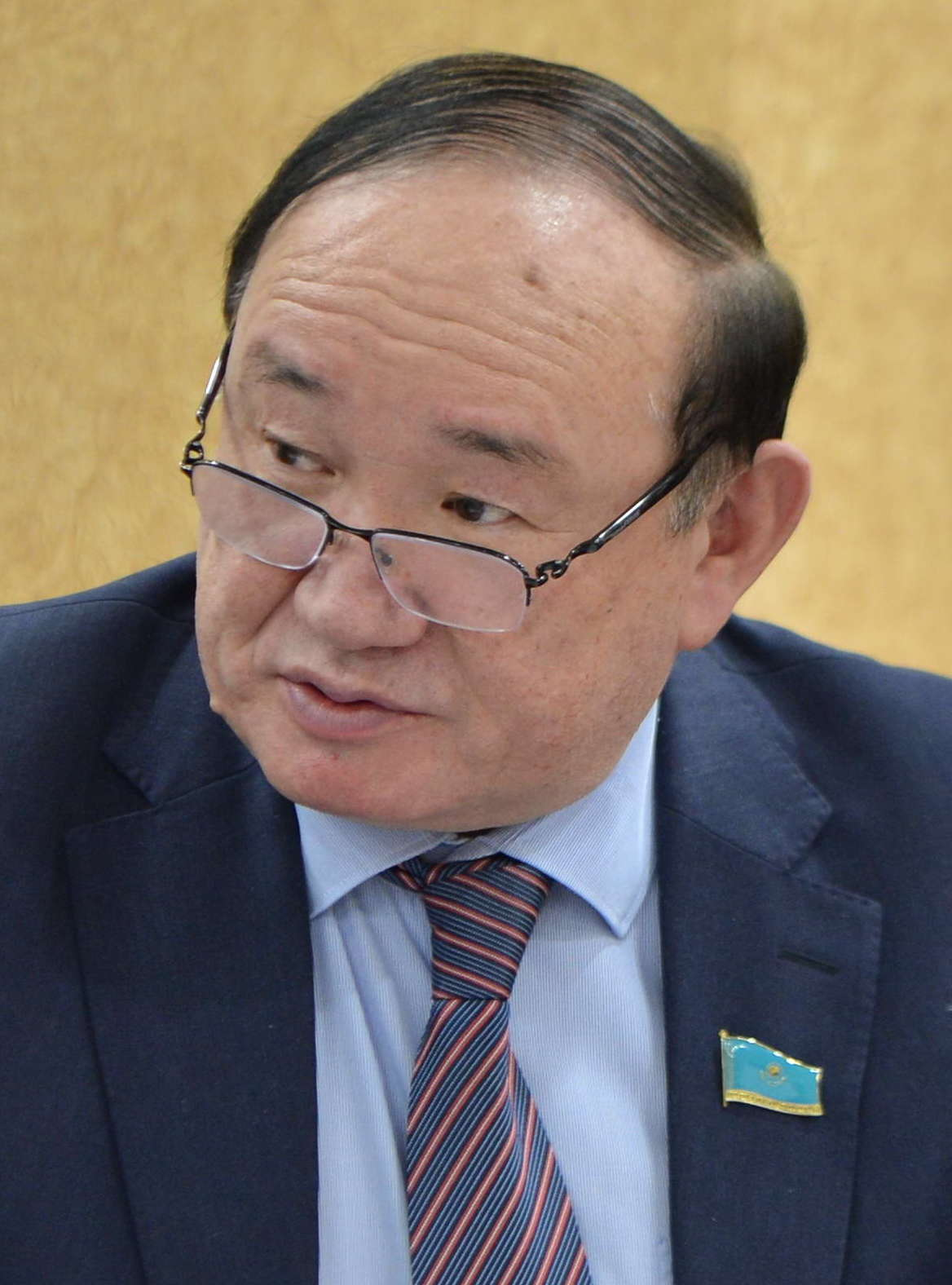

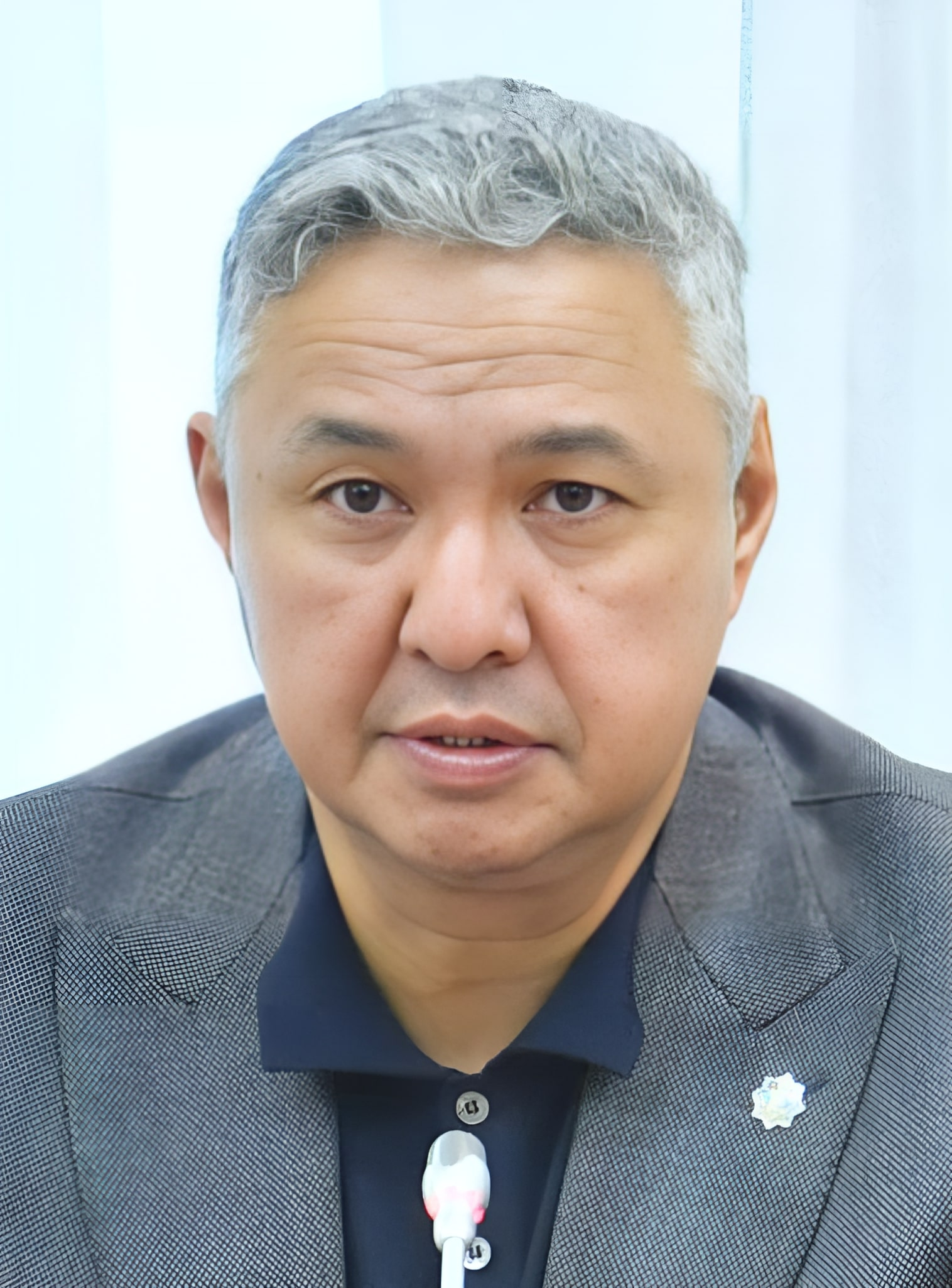

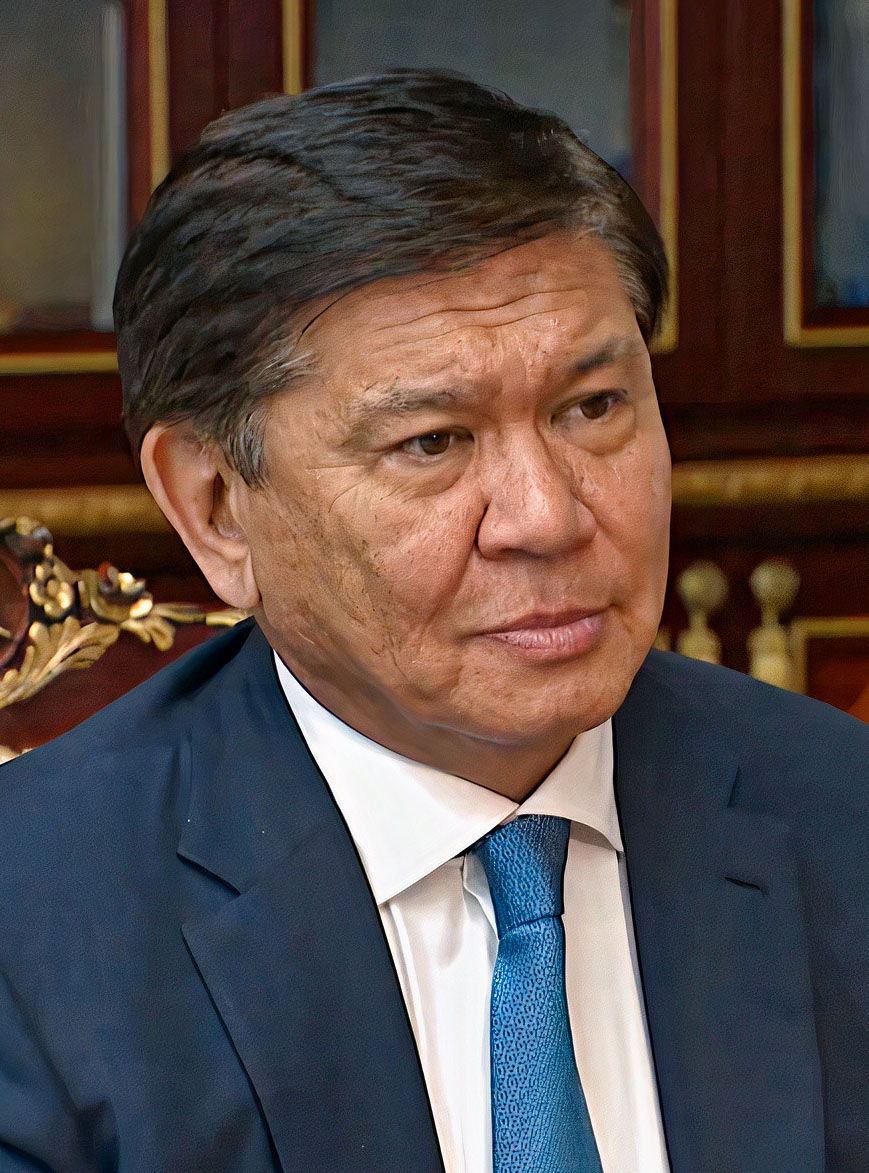
Leader	Erlan Qoşanov	Äli Bektaev
Party	Amanat	Auyl
Last election	2,685, 80.2%	227, 7.4%
Leader	Azat Peruashev	Ermūhamet Ertısbaev
Party	Aq Jol	QHP
Last election	224, 7.3%	86, 3.0%

Local elections are set to be held in Kazakhstan on 19 March 2023 to elect a total of 3,415 seats to 223 mäslihats (local assemblies) across all regions of Kazakhstan. The local elections will be held alongside 2023 legislative elections and were held under the basis of mixed-member majoritarian representation, which for the first time since 2016 reinstated single-member districts that were previously abolished in 2018.

The local elections were initially announced by President Kassym-Jomart Tokayev during the State of the Nation Address on 1 September 2022. He then signed a presidential decree on 19 January 2023 which dissolved the tenure of all mäslihats and set the election date.

== Background ==
The 2021 local elections were previously held under the newly 2018 implemented party-list proportional representation voting law, to which regional and district deputies were nominated by their respective parties as candidates within electoral lists while at the same time restricted independents from becoming deputies. From there, the ruling Nur Otan party (now Amanat) earned most of 3,083 seats in all levels of mäslihats (local assemblies), which was followed by the Auyl People's Democratic Patriotic Party (227 seats), Aq Jol Democratic Party (224 seats) and Adal (24 seats).

During legislative tenure of mäslihats, a share of deputies affiliated with ruling Amanat party slightly increased due to its merger with the Adal in April 2022, to which all Adal's control of 24 mandates were fully submerged to the Amanat.

In the aftermath of the 2022 Kazakh unrest, President Kassym-Jomart Tokayev in his March 2022 State of the Nation Address unveiled a series of reforms regarding changes to the structure of mäslihats by granting them more decision-making powers and localised influence, including the implementation of a mixed electoral system. Following a constitutional referendum in a September 2022 State of the Nation Address, Tokayev announced a snap election for mäslihat deputies to take place in the first half of 2023 in parr with the legislative elections. He also noted that the local electoral system would be held under a new mechanism that included a return of single-member districts within the mäslihat compositions.

After being reelected in November 2022, President Tokayev on 19 January 2023 signed a decree in officially dissolving the functions in all levels of mäslihats and scheduling the snap election date for 19 March.

== See also ==
- 2023 Kazakh legislative election
