= Kazakhstan's 22nd electoral district =

Single-mandate territorial constituency in Kazakhstan

Electoral district No. 22
- Kazakh: №22 сайлау округі Russian: Избирательный округ №22
- Single-mandate constituency for the Mäjilis
- Region: Atyrau Region (2004–2007); Mangystau Region (2022–present)
- Population: 772,705 (2023)
- Electorate: 412,183 (2023)
- Major settlements: Aktau (seat) and Zhanaozen

Current constituency
- Created: 2004; 2022 (re-established)
- Seats: 1
- Party: Amanat
- Deputy: Edil Jañbyrşin
- Elected: 2023

The Electoral district No. 22 (Kazakh: №22 сайлау округі, romanized: №22 sailau okrugı; Russian: Избирательный округ №22) is a single-mandate territorial constituency in Kazakhstan, represented in the lower chamber Mäjilis of the Parliament. It covers the entirety of Mangystau Region, including all its regional districts, with its seat being centered in Aktau.

The constituency was originally formed for the 2004 legislative election and existed until being abolished in 2007. However, it has been reestablished in 2022 and is currently represented by deputy Edil Jañbyrşin (Amanat) since March 2023.

== Geography ==
The Electoral district No. 22 is situated in the territory of Mangystau Region, and its administrative center, Aktau, serves as the seat of the constituency. The electoral district shares borders with No. 13 (Atyrau Region) to the north, and No. 10 (Aktobe Region) to the northwest.

== History ==
The Electoral district No. 22 was formed for the 2004 legislative election as a result of redistribution originally within the boundaries of Atyrau Region, and Uzaqqali Eleubaev served as deputy from the constituency. From there, the electoral district continued to exist until its dissolution following the 2007 amendment, which led to the abolition of all constituencies as part of the transition from a mixed-member majoritarian representation to a fully party-list proportional representation system. The change affected the composition of all seats in the lower chamber Mäjilis of the Kazakh Parliament beginning with the 2007 legislative election.

In December 2022, the Electoral district No. 22 was reestablished by the Central Election Commission in the territory of Mangystau Region, which came into effect on 1 January 2023 as a result of the 2022 amendment. The adoption of this amendment marked the reintroduction of a mixed electoral system for electing Mäjilis deputies, with the use of numbered constituencies being reinstated for the first time since 2004. It made its debut in the 2023 legislative election, with Edil Jañbyrşin becoming the elected representative of the constituency.

== Deputies ==
Election	Member	Party	%	Representing region
2004	Uzaqqali Eleubaev	Otan	69.0	Atyrau Region
2007	Defunct (Single-nationwide PR constituency)			
2012	Defunct (Single-nationwide PR constituency)			
2016	Defunct (Single-nationwide PR constituency)			
2021	Defunct (Single-nationwide PR constituency)			
2023	Edil Jañbyrşin	Amanat	52.6	Mangystau Region

== Election results ==
=== 2023 ===
Candidate	Party	Votes	%
Edil Jañbyrşin	Amanat	117,880	52.60
Qaiyrbek Maqulov	Independent	46,909	20.93
Mäulen Ğabdulqaliev	Independent	20,947	9.35
Muratbai Jumağaliev	Independent	11,291	5.04
Baltabai Baqtybaev	Independent	9,066	4.05
Saltanat Bralina	Independent	6,551	2.92
Daniar Aisa	Independent	2,029	0.91
Lilia Dzhavadova	Independent	1,726	0.77
Abylai Bekqajy	Independent	511	0.23
Against all		7,184	3.21
Total		224,094	100.00
Valid votes		224,094	98.78
Invalid/blank votes		2,777	1.22
Total votes		226,871	100.00
Registered voters/turnout		412,183	55.04
Amanat gain			
Source: CEC
