= Kazakhstan's 14th electoral district =

Single-mandate territorial constituency in Kazakhstan

Electoral district No. 14
- Kazakh: №14 сайлау округі Russian: Избирательный округ №14
- Single-mandate constituency for the Mäjilis
- Region: Almaty Region (2004–2007); West Kazakhstan Region (2022–present)
- Population: 689,619 (2023)
- Electorate: 442,446 (2023)
- Major settlements: Oral (seat)

Current constituency
- Created: 2004; 2022 (re-established)
- Seats: 1
- Party: Independent
- Deputy: Abzal Quspan
- Elected: 2023

The Electoral district No. 14 (Kazakh: №14 сайлау округі, romanized: №14 sailau okrugı; Russian: Избирательный округ №14) is a single-mandate territorial constituency in Kazakhstan, represented in the lower chamber Mäjilis of the Parliament. It covers the entirety of West Kazakhstan Region, including all its regional districts, with its seat being centered in Oral.

The constituency was originally formed for the 2004 legislative election and existed until being abolished in 2007. However, it has been reestablished in 2022 and is currently represented by deputy Abzal Quspanov (Independent) since March 2023.

== Geography ==
The Electoral district No. 14 situated in the territory of West Kazakhstan Region, and its administrative center, Oral, serves as the seat of the constituency. The electoral district shares borders with No. 10 (Aktobe Region) to the east and No. 13 (Atyrau Region) to the south.

== History ==
The Electoral district No. 14 was formed for the 2004 legislative election as a result of redistribution originally within the boundaries of Almaty Region, and Ermuhanbet Omarov served as deputy from the constituency. From there, the electoral district continued to exist until its dissolution following the 2007 constitutional amendment, which led to the abolition of all constituencies as part of the transition from a mixed-member majoritarian representation to a fully party-list proportional representation system. The change affected the composition of all seats in the lower chamber Mäjilis of the Kazakh Parliament beginning with the 2007 legislative election.

On 24 December 2022, the Electoral district No. 14 was reestablished by the Central Election Commission in the territory of West Kazakhstan Region, which came into effect on 1 January 2023 as a result of the 2022 amendment. The adoption of this amendment marked the reintroduction of a mixed electoral system for electing Mäjilis deputies, with the use of numbered constituencies being reinstated for the first time since 2004. It made its debut in the 2023 legislative election, with Abzal Quspanov becoming the elected representative of the constituency.

== Deputies ==
Election	Member	Party	%	Representing region
2004	Ermuhanbet Omarov	Otan	57.7	Almaty Region
2007	Defunct (Single-nationwide PR constituency)			
2012	Defunct (Single-nationwide PR constituency)			
2016	Defunct (Single-nationwide PR constituency)			
2021	Defunct (Single-nationwide PR constituency)			
2023	Abzal Quspanov	Independent	50.2	West Kazakhstan Region

== Election results ==
=== 2023 ===
Candidate	Party	Votes	%
Abzal Quspanov	Independent	126,784	50.22
Ulyqpan Ahmediarov	Independent	46,172	18.29
Alpamys Qamalov	Independent	15,721	6.23
Nädir Qurymbaev	People's Party of Kazakhstan	11,410	4.52
Talğat Qatauov	Independent	9,086	3.60
Azamat Musilov	Independent	6,196	2.45
Oksana Dementievskaya	Independent	5,937	2.35
Aleksandr Kapustin	Independent	5,296	2.10
Aqylbek Dauymşar	Independent	4,337	1.72
Against all		21,531	8.53
Total		252,470	100.00
Valid votes		252,470	96.39
Invalid/blank votes		9,447	3.61
Total votes		261,917	100.00
Registered voters/turnout		442,446	59.20
Independent gain			
Source: CEC
