= Jiguli Dairabaev =

Kazakh politician

Jiguli Dayrabayev
- Жигули Дайрабаев
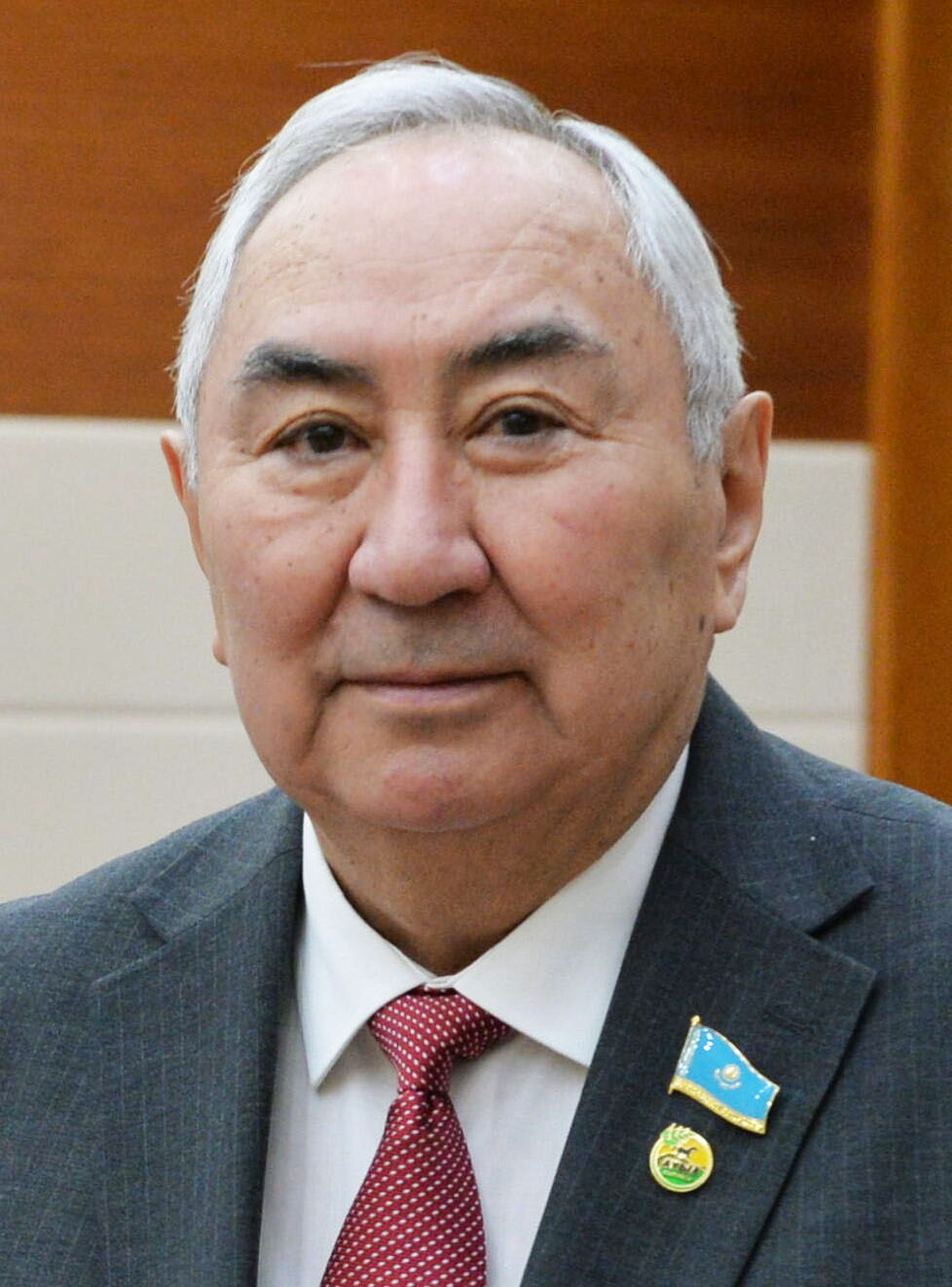
- Dairabaev in 2023

Member of the Mäjilis
- In office 29 March 2023 – 1 July 2026
- Constituency: Auyl List

Member of the Supreme Council of Kazakhstan
- In office 1990 – 11 March 1995

Personal details
- Born: Zhiguli Moldakalykovich Dayrabayev; 29 October 1954 (age 71) Lugovoy District, Dzhambul Region, Kazakh SSR, Soviet Union
- Party: Auyl (2022, 2023–present)
- Other political affiliations: CPSU (before 1991); Nur Otan (until 2020); Adal (2020–2022); Independent (2022–2023)
- Children: 2
- Education: Turar Ryskulov Kazakh Agricultural Institute (1981); Higher School of the Agricultural Complex (1989)

Military service
- Allegiance: Soviet Union
- Branch/service: Soviet Army
- Years of service: 1972–1974

Jiguli Moldaqalyqūly Dairabaev (also Zhiguli; Kazakh: Жигули Молдақалықұлы Дайрабаев, Kazakh pronunciation: [ʒɨɡulɪj dɑjɾəbɑjəf]; born 29 October 1954) is a Kazakh politician who served as a member of the Supreme Council of Kazakhstan from 1990 to 1995. He is currently the chairman of the Association of Farmers of Kazakhstan and was the candidate for the 2022 presidential elections from the Auyl People's Democratic Patriotic Party.

== Biography ==
Dairabaev was born on 29 October 1954. From 1974 to 1977, Dairabaev, who worked as a shepherd's assistant and a driver, began his career as the secretary of the Komsomol committee of the Lugovoy District "Put k kommunizmu" (Russian: "Road to Communism") collective. From 1977, he held the position of the chairman of the trade union committee of the collective "Put k kommunizmu" of Lugovoy District until 1980. Dairabaev was appointed the chairman of the Kamensk Rural Executive Committee of that year after stepping down as a chairman. After that, for two years (1985–1987) he was the secretary of the party committee of the Algabas State Sheep Farm of Lugovoi District.

From 1987 to 1995, Dairabaev served as the chairman of the board of Jambyl Association of Lugovoi district, and for 2 years he was appointed to the position of director of the Koragaty branch.

=== Member of the Supreme Council ===
In 1990, Dairabaev was elected as a member of the 12th convocation of the Supreme Council of Kazakhstan. During his tenure as a legislator, which lasted for the next 5 years, there were historical changes, such as the entry into force of the declaration of independence of Kazakhstan, the approval of the first constitution and state symbols of independent Kazakhstan, and the adoption of about 300 laws.

=== After membership in the Supreme Council ===
Dairabaev was the head of the Turar Ryskulov District Statistics Department (1997–2001), the director of the grain receiving enterprise "Berliksky" of the Shu District, the director of the enterprise "Kazeksim-Merki" of the Merken district (2001–2009), the general director of the LLP "MOLBAL" (2009–2015). He served as the chairman of the Jambyl regional branch of the "Kazakhstan Farmers' Union" KP (2015–2019), the president of the "Kazakhstan Farmers' Union" RKB association (2019–2022).

Dairabaev currently serves as a member of the National Constituent Assembly under the President since 14 June 2022, chairman of the board of the Kazakhstan Farmers' Association since June 2022, and chairman of the agro-industrial complex committee of the Chairmanship of the NCP "Atameken" since June 2022.

== Controversies ==
=== Allegations of fraud against his sons ===
On 3 October 2022, Dairabaev's sons Didar Moldaqalyq and Marat Dairabaev, as well as the former head of the agriculture department of the Jambyl regional administration, Yerlan Kulkeev, were accused in various media of looting property entrusted to them by others and committing fraud. A few days later it was announced that a case had been opened against them.

Dairabaev responded to the allegations as follows: "My sons are adults, they have their own lives. The fact that they are in prison and everything else is fake. One of my sons sows crops, the other grows strawberries. We cannot interfere in the work of law enforcement agencies and courts. Time will tell everything."

== Personal life ==
Dairabaev is married, has two sons and seven grandchildren.

== Awards ==
=== Medals ===
- 10 years of independence of the Republic of Kazakhstan;
- 25 years of independence of the Republic of Kazakhstan;
- 30 years of independence of the Republic of Kazakhstan;
- Labor veteran of the Republic of Kazakhstan;
- Honorable veteran;
- For meritorious service to the region;
- Excellence in agriculture of the Republic of Kazakhstan.

=== Honorable titles ===
- Honored citizen of Turar Ryskulov District of Jambyl Region;
- Honored citizen of Jambyl Region.

=== Other ===
- Letter of thanks from the President of the Republic of Kazakhstan.
