= Kassym-Jomart Tokayev 2019 presidential campaign =

Kazakh political campaign

Kassym-Jomart Tokayev for President
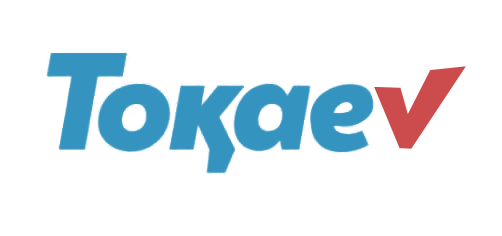
- Campaign: 2019 Kazakh presidential election
- Candidate: Kassym-Jomart Tokayev; Acting President of Kazakhstan (2019–present); Chair of the Senate of Kazakhstan (2013–2019, 2007–2011); State Secretary of Kazakhstan (2002–2007); Prime Minister of Kazakhstan (1999–2002)
- Affiliation: Nur Otan
- Status: Announced; 23 April 2019; Official nominee 23 April 2019; Won election 9 June 2019
- Slogan(s): Игілік баршаға ("Wellbeing for all")

Acting President Kassym-Jomart Tokayev became the presidential nominee for the ruling Nur Otan on 23 April 2019. He received backing from his predecessor and the party's chairman Nursultan Nazarbayev, calling him the "worthiest candidate." On 3 May 2019, Tokayev was officially registered by the Central Election Commission and from evening 11 May, he launched his election campaign where all the platforms were announced on the website with the slogan "Игілік баршаға" (İgılık barşağa, Wellbeing for all).

== Programs ==
=== Platforms ===
On 11 May 2019, Tokayev's campaign unveiled platforms in the official website where were divided into three sections as it follows:

==== Continuity ====
- Public unity
- Increase in wage and quality of life
- Rigorous implementation social programs by Elbasy and their further development
- Increasing our achievements part to the economic growth

==== Justice ====
- Supreme law and justified courts
- Public safety
- Eradication of corruption
- Effective system of social support
- High quality and general access to medicine
- Modern standardized education for all
- Employment and creation of new jobs
- Effective government leadership

==== Progress ====
- Dynamic economy
- Livable and modernized villages
- Successful entrepreneurship
- Effective financial system
- First-class infrastructure
- Affordable and clean ecology
- Progressiveness in Kazakhstan in modern era
- Transformation of political system
- Support for the young

=== Foreign policy ===
As a politician, Tokayev had wide experience in foreign affairs by serving as Foreign Minister, State Secretary and the Director-General of the United Nations Office at Geneva. He announced the intention in firmly promote and defend national interests in the world arena as well as strengthen relations with every country.

He also expressed strong support for Russia, calling it a "strategic ally" where he vowed to maintain relations as Nursultan Nazarbayev did.

=== Economic policy ===
Tokayev promised for sustainable economic growth rates for Kazakhstan's to reach into the 30 most developed countries. He also supported the taxation system to be simplified through the optimization and unification of taxes. The level of the shadow economy is planned to be reduced to the level of the OECD countries - 15-17%.

== Campaign ==
Tokayev visited several regions and cities in his campaign. A well-known businessman and MP of the regional mäslihat from the East Kazakhstan Region Erzhan Nurbaev urged residents of the Altai District to support the candidacy of Tokayev's in the upcoming presidential elections.

Tokayev was mocked on social media for the overuse of modification of his official photos, erasing his wrinkles and double chin.

== Results ==
Results of the 2019 presidential election

Candidate	Party	Votes	%
Kassym-Jomart Tokayev	Nur Otan	6,539,715	70.96
Amirjan Qosanov	Ult Tagdyry	1,495,401	16.23
Dania Espaeva	Ak Zhol Democratic Party	465,714	5.05
Toleutai Raqymbekov	Auyl People's Democratic Patriotic Party	280,451	3.04
Amangeldi Taspihov	Federation of Trade Unions	182,898	1.98
Jambyl Ahmetbekov	Communist People's Party	167,649	1.82
Sadibek Tügel	Uly Dala Qyrandary	84,582	0.92
Total		9,216,410	100.00
Valid votes		9,216,410	99.38
Invalid/blank votes		57,700	0.62
Total votes		9,274,110	100.00
Registered voters/turnout		11,960,364	77.54
Source: CEC
