= Amangeldi Taspihov 2019 presidential campaign =

Amangeldi Taspihov for President
- Campaigned for: 2019 Kazakh presidential election
- Candidate: Amangeldi Taspihov; Member of the Mazhilis (2016–present)
- Affiliation: QRKF
- Status: Announced; 24 April 2019; Official nominee 24 April 2019; Lost election 9 June 2019
- Slogan: Жұмыс істейтін шақ! ("Time to work!")

Amangeldi Taspihov, Chairman of the West Kazakhstan Region's Trade Unions and former MP of Mazhilis was nominated by the Federation of Trade Unions of Kazakhstan (QRKF) to be the presidential candidate on 24 April 2019. On 4 May 2019, Taspihov became a registered candidate by the Central Election Commission after gathering about 120,000 signatures. On 13 May, Taspihov's campaign published its own electoral platforms.

== Programs ==
- Strengthening the responsibility of unfair employers
- Safe working conditions
- Ensuring labor rights of employees
- Decent living wages
- Regulation of labor migration

== Campaign ==
Throughout the campaign, Taspihov's campaign emphasized on protecting the rights and interests of working Kazakhstanis.

On 27 May 2019, he proposed amendments to the labor code, saying “these are people who received education, were born here, became specialists. When there should be a return for their homeland, they are forced to leave for other countries, as they are in demand in other countries, they do not receive a decent salary - this is a big problem, I think this problem can be solved. This issue should be dealt with especially by local executive bodies, akims in order to create better conditions in rural areas, create jobs."

During the presidential debates, Taspihov talked about being from large family and didn't attend rallies but worked and wasn't a life-long Mazhilis MP.

== Results ==
Results of the 2019 presidential election

Candidate	Party	Votes	%
Kassym-Jomart Tokayev	Nur Otan	6,539,715	70.96
Amirjan Qosanov	Ult Tagdyry	1,495,401	16.23
Dania Espaeva	Ak Zhol Democratic Party	465,714	5.05
Toleutai Raqymbekov	Auyl People's Democratic Patriotic Party	280,451	3.04
Amangeldi Taspihov	Federation of Trade Unions	182,898	1.98
Jambyl Ahmetbekov	Communist People's Party	167,649	1.82
Sadibek Tügel	Uly Dala Qyrandary	84,582	0.92
Total		9,216,410	100.00
Valid votes		9,216,410	99.38
Invalid/blank votes		57,700	0.62
Total votes		9,274,110	100.00
Registered voters/turnout		11,960,364	77.54
Source: CEC
