= Toleutai Raqymbekov 2019 presidential campaign =

Toleutai Raqymbekov for President
- Campaigned for: 2019 Kazakh presidential election
- Candidate: Toleutai Raqymbekov; Chairman of the National Agrarian Scientific and Educational Center (2019–present); Vice Minister of Agriculture (2017)
- Affiliation: Auyl
- Status: Announced; 25 April 2019; Official nominee 25 April 2019; Lost election 9 June 2019
- Slogan: Басты мақсат - елге қызмет ету ("The main goal - to serve the country")

Former Vice Minister of Agriculture and Chairman of the National Agrarian Scientific and Educational Center Toleutai Raqymbekov was announced as the Auyl nominee by the party chairman Äli Bektaev on 25 April 2019 at the 15th Extraordinary Congress. The decision according to Bektaev was due to "the desire to re-declare the goals and strategic objectives." On 6 May 2019, Raqymbekov was officially registered as the presidential candidate by the Central Election Commission. Raqymbekov began his campaign at rally in Taraz on 13 May.

== Platforms ==
- Development of agricultural industrial complex
- Social equality in villages and cities
- Preservation of traditional and spiritual values

=== Economic policy ===
Raqymbekov campaigned on agricultural economy by proposing in improvement of infrastructure to procure, process and sell agricultural products, developing trade and improving agricultural production mechanisms, claiming it would help improve Kazakhstan's exports. He also stood by the position in allowing for farmers to receive grants from the government.

The main idea of Raqymbekov's programs was that "Kazakhstan should become an agro-power capable of ensuring food independence and become one of the leaders in the world market of environmentally friendly products."

== Campaign ==
Throughout his campaign, Raqymbekov was known for being active on Facebook. He frequently hosted live streams for his followers and comments on Kazakh news. He addressed issues that were based on rural areas. Raqymbekov did not mention any topics that were related to political development, human rights and freedoms, the Kazakh language, regional development, ecology and foreign policy.

In an interview to Alma TV, Raqymbekov said that "In production today, the average milk yield is about 8,100 kilogrammes per milk cow. On average, in Kazakhstan, we have not reached the 3,000-kilogramme level. What is this telling us? If we achieve an average of 8,000 kilogrammes per cow, it will be possible to receive earnings through the export of about $10 billion" he said.

Throughout the election, Raqymbekov's campaign held about 300 events.

On 25 May 2019, the representatives of the Raqymbekov's campaign organized a political flash mob in Taldıqorğan for the mass performance of the dance "Qara Jorga".

== Results ==
Results of the 2019 presidential election

Candidate	Party	Votes	%
Kassym-Jomart Tokayev	Nur Otan	6,539,715	70.96
Amirjan Qosanov	Ult Tagdyry	1,495,401	16.23
Dania Espaeva	Ak Zhol Democratic Party	465,714	5.05
Toleutai Raqymbekov	Auyl People's Democratic Patriotic Party	280,451	3.04
Amangeldi Taspihov	Federation of Trade Unions	182,898	1.98
Jambyl Ahmetbekov	Communist People's Party	167,649	1.82
Sadibek Tügel	Uly Dala Qyrandary	84,582	0.92
Total		9,216,410	100.00
Valid votes		9,216,410	99.38
Invalid/blank votes		57,700	0.62
Total votes		9,274,110	100.00
Registered voters/turnout		11,960,364	77.54
Source: CEC
