= Jambyl Ahmetbekov 2019 presidential campaign =

Jambyl Ahmetbekov for President
- Campaigned for: 2019 Kazakh presidential election
- Candidate: Jambyl Ahmetbekov; Member of the Mazhilis (2012–present); Secretary of the Communist People's Party (2007–2020)
- Affiliation: QKHP
- Status: Announced; 26 April 2019; Official nominee 26 April 2019; Lost election 9 June 2019
- Slogan: Адал еңбек қоғам мүддесі үшін! ("Honest work for the benefit of society!")

Secretary of the Communist People's Party of Kazakhstan (QKHP) and Mazhilis MP Jambyl Ahmetbekov was unanimously nominated as a presidential candidate at the party's 14th Congress on 26 April 2019. Ahmetbekov was the party's nominee in the 2011 presidential election where he earned 3rd place in the race and took 1.36% of the vote. He began collecting signatures on 29 April and was finished by 4 May 2019. Ahmetbekov was officially registered by the Central Election Commission on 6 May. He expressed his confidence in the race claiming his experience and known popularity would benefit him. Ahmetbekov's campaign officially announced the electoral platforms on 14 May and the following day, Ahmetbekov himself presented them in the villages of Korgalzhyn and Shalkar in Akmola Region.

== Policies ==
- Bringing oligarchic fugitives to justice
- Taxation for the rich
- Ending poverty
- Rejection of westernization
- Economic integration with neighboring countries

=== Economic policy ===
Ahmetbekov advocated the continuation of economic integration in international relations with neighboring countries, both within the Eurasian Economic Union (EEU) and the Belt and Road Initiative with China. Although he stated that "economic interaction with the closest neighbors should carry the basis for the growth of the well-being of ordinary Kazakhstanis, not oligarchs."

== Campaign ==
Throughout the campaign, Ahmetbekov took a populist tone where he blamed the lack of social spending on "fugitive oligarchs" in which he referred to exiled Kazakh banker and politician Mukhtar Ablyazov by accusing of stealing all the government budget money. He called for prosecution and tighter legislation to combat the problem. In an interview to Vlast.kz, Ahmetbekov proposed for regulation of certain content on the internet by having Kazakhstan creating its own Facebook, telling that "no one from the outside would act on us, on our brains! The same fugitive oligarch like Ablyazov. Or his supporters, or his henchmen who process the brains."

On 20 May 2019, he held meeting with the labor collective of the Kyzylorda Bus Depot.

== Results ==
Results of the 2019 presidential election

Candidate	Party	Votes	%
Kassym-Jomart Tokayev	Nur Otan	6,539,715	70.96
Amirjan Qosanov	Ult Tagdyry	1,495,401	16.23
Dania Espaeva	Ak Zhol Democratic Party	465,714	5.05
Toleutai Raqymbekov	Auyl People's Democratic Patriotic Party	280,451	3.04
Amangeldi Taspihov	Federation of Trade Unions	182,898	1.98
Jambyl Ahmetbekov	Communist People's Party	167,649	1.82
Sadibek Tügel	Uly Dala Qyrandary	84,582	0.92
Total		9,216,410	100.00
Valid votes		9,216,410	99.38
Invalid/blank votes		57,700	0.62
Total votes		9,274,110	100.00
Registered voters/turnout		11,960,364	77.54
Source: CEC
