= Dania Espaeva 2019 presidential campaign =

Dania Espaeva for President
- Campaigned for: 2019 Kazakh presidential election
- Candidate: Dania Espaeva; Member of the Mazhilis (2016–present)
- Affiliation: Ak Zhol
- Status: Announced; 24 April 2019; Official nominee 24 April 2019; Lost election 9 June 2019
- Slogan: Табысқа ұмтылу ("Striving for success")

Danial Espaeva, member of the Mazhilis from 2016, was announced as a presidential nominee for the Ak Zhol Democratic Party on 24 April 2019, making her the first female in Kazakhstan history to bid for presidency. With 190 party delegates participation in the nomination, she received votes from half of the delegates while the remaining were divided among 5 men that were bidding for the nomination. This sparked controversy at the party congress to which Espaeva called it "offensive" and noted that no female in the Kazakh government has been involved in high-level corruption cases.

The Central Election Commission registered Espaeva as the candidate for the election on 3 May 2019 and announced her campaign platform on 12 May.

== Platforms ==
- Promote competition and mass entrepreneurship
- National independence
- Fighting against corruption and de-offshorization

=== Economic policy ===
Espaeva supported to reduce interest rates in banks, as well as to end the practice of devaluation and improve the public procurement program. She also called for reduced tax rates for priority industries, particularly or mechanical engineering and to make lending more accessible to entrepreneurs with lastly, a focus on the creation of new industries in the rural areas.

== Campaign ==
Despite being the first-female candidate in Kazakhstan, in an interview Espaeva was asked whether she preferred man or woman leading the country, she responded that a man should.

Espaeva began her campaign rally by visiting a bread-baking plant in Almaty where she met workers consisted mostly of women.

== Results ==
Results of the 2019 presidential election

Candidate	Party	Votes	%
Kassym-Jomart Tokayev	Nur Otan	6,539,715	70.96
Amirjan Qosanov	Ult Tagdyry	1,495,401	16.23
Dania Espaeva	Ak Zhol Democratic Party	465,714	5.05
Toleutai Raqymbekov	Auyl People's Democratic Patriotic Party	280,451	3.04
Amangeldi Taspihov	Federation of Trade Unions	182,898	1.98
Jambyl Ahmetbekov	Communist People's Party	167,649	1.82
Sadibek Tügel	Uly Dala Qyrandary	84,582	0.92
Total		9,216,410	100.00
Valid votes		9,216,410	99.38
Invalid/blank votes		57,700	0.62
Total votes		9,274,110	100.00
Registered voters/turnout		11,960,364	77.54
Source: CEC
