= Politics of Kazakhstan =

The politics of Kazakhstan takes place in the framework of a semi-presidential republic, whereby the President of Kazakhstan is head of state and nominates the head of government. Executive power is exercised by the government. Legislative power is vested in both the government and the unicameral Kurultai.

Kazakhstan's independent history has been heavily shaped by Nursultan Nazarbayev, who ruled Kazakhstan from 1991 to 2019. His authoritarian regime was characterized by significant human rights abuses, nepotism, and systemic corruption. Elections and constitutional referendums were held, but they were not free and fair.

== Executive branch ==
Image	Post	Name	Party	Term
	President	Kassym-Jomart Tokayev	Independent	20 March 2019
	Vice President	Erlan Karin	Independent	31 August 2026
	Prime Minister	Oljas Bektenov	Adilet	6 February 2024

The president is elected by popular vote for a unrenewable seven-year term. He may appoint the vice president, who fulfills the role of acting President of Kazakhstan in the absence of the president. The prime minister and first deputy prime minister are appointed by the president as well. The Council of Ministers is also appointed by the president. President Nazarbayev expanded his presidential powers by decree: only he can initiate constitutional amendments, appoint and dismiss the government, dissolve Parliament, call referendums at his discretion, and appoint administrative heads of regions and cities.

The president is the head of state. He also is the commander in chief of the armed forces and may veto legislation that has been passed by the Parliament. President Nursultan Nazarbayev, who was in office since Kazakhstan became independent, won a new 7-year term in the 1999 election that the Organization for Security and Cooperation in Europe said fell short of international standards. A major political opponent, former prime minister Akezhan Kazhegeldin, was prohibited from running against the president because he had attended an unauthorized meeting of "the movement for free elections". On top of this the election was unconstitutionally called two years ahead of schedule. Free access to the media is also denied to opposing opinions. In 2002 a law set very stringent requirements for the maintenance of legal status of a political party, which lowered the number of legal parties from 19 in 2002 to 8 in 2003. The prime minister, who serves at the pleasure of the president, chairs the Cabinet of Ministers and serves as Kazakhstan's head of government. There are three deputy prime ministers and 16 ministers in the Cabinet. Bakhytzhan Sagintayev became the Prime Minister in September 2016.

== Legislative branch ==
Until 2026, Kazakhstan had a bicameral legislature, known as the Parliament of Kazakhstan. The Lower House Assembly (Mazhilis) had 107 seats, elected for a four-year term, 98 seats are from party lists, 9 - from Assembly of People. All MPs are elected for 5 years. The Upper House Senate has 47 members, 40 of whom are elected for six-year terms in double-seat constituencies by the local assemblies, half renewed every two years, and 7 presidential appointees. In addition, ex-presidents are ex officio senators for life. Majilis deputies and the government both have the right of legislative initiative, though most legislation considered by the Parliament is proposed by the government. Several deputies were elected from the Assembly of People of Kazakhstan.

In 2026, a constitutional amendment replaced the Parliament with a unicameral legislature known as the Kurultai.

== Judicial branch ==
There are 65 judges on the Supreme Court of Kazakhstan. There are seven members of the Constitutional Council. Out of the 7 members, 3 are appointed by the president.

There are local and oblast (regional) level courts, and a national-level Supreme Court. Local level courts serve as courts of first instance for less serious crimes such as theft and vandalism. Oblast level courts hear more serious criminal cases and also hear cases in rural areas where no local courts have been established. A judgment by a local court may be appealed to the oblast level. The Supreme Court is a cassation court that hears appeals from the oblast courts.

The constitution establishes a seven-member Constitutional Council to determine the constitutionality of laws adopted by the legislature. It also rules on challenges to elections and referendums and interprets the constitution. The president appoints three of its members, including the chair.

Under constitutional amendments of 1998, the president appoints a chairperson of a Higher Judicial Council, which nominates judges for the Supreme Court. The Council consists of the chairperson of the Constitutional Council, the chairperson of the Supreme Court, the Prosecutor General, the Minister of Justice, senators, judges, and other persons appointed by the president. The president recommends and the Senate (upper legislative chamber) approves these nominees for the Supreme Court. Oblast judges (nominated by the Higher Judicial Council) are appointed by the president. Lower level judges are appointed by the president from a list presented by the Higher Judicial Council. Under legislation approved in 2000, judges serve for life.

== Political parties and elections ==
Early presidential elections were held in Kazakhstan on 9 June 2019 following the resignation of long-term president Nursultan Nazarbayev. Originally scheduled for 2020, seven candidates were registered to participate in the elections, including incumbent president Kassym-Jomart Tokayev, who had assumed the presidency three months before the elections following the resignation of Nazarbayev. Tokayev was subsequently re-elected with 71% of the vote. His closest challenger, Amirjan Qosanov of the Ult Tagdyry party, received 16%.

Candidate	Party	Votes	%
Kassym-Jomart Tokayev	Nur Otan	6,539,715	70.96
Amirjan Qosanov	Ult Tagdyry	1,495,401	16.23
Dania Espaeva	Ak Zhol Democratic Party	465,714	5.05
Toleutai Raqymbekov	Auyl People's Democratic Patriotic Party	280,451	3.04
Amangeldi Taspihov	Federation of Trade Unions	182,898	1.98
Jambyl Ahmetbekov	Communist People's Party	167,649	1.82
Sadibek Tügel	Uly Dala Qyrandary	84,582	0.92
Total		9,216,410	100.00
Valid votes		9,216,410	99.38
Invalid/blank votes		57,700	0.62
Total votes		9,274,110	100.00
Registered voters/turnout		11,960,364	77.54
Source: CEC

Party	Votes	%	Seats	+/–
Nur Otan	6,183,757	82.20	84	+1
Aq Jol	540,406	7.18	7	–1
Communist People's Party	537,123	7.14	7	0
Auyl People's Democratic Patriotic Party	151,285	2.01	0	0
Nationwide Social Democratic Party	88,813	1.18	0	0
Birlik	21,484	0.29	0	New
Members elected by the Assembly of People			9	0
Total	7,522,868	100.00	107	0
Valid votes	7,522,868	99.43		
Invalid/blank votes	43,282	0.57		
Total votes	7,566,150	100.00		
Registered voters/turnout	9,810,852	77.12		
Source: CEC, CEC

== International organization participation ==
In 1999, Kazakhstan applied for observer status at the Council of Europe Parliamentary Assembly. The official response of the Assembly was that Kazakhstan could apply for full membership, because it is partially located in Europe, but that they would not be granted any status whatsoever at the Council until their democracy and human rights records improved. Improvement in these areas has been made for in 2012, Kazakhstan was elected by United Nations members to serve on the UN Human Rights Council. Despite this, Kazakhstan is still considered to have a very poor human rights record by analysts such as The Economist Intelligence Unit.

AsDB, CIS, EAPC, EBRD, ECE, ECO, ESCAP, FAO, IAEA, IBRD, ICAO, IDA, IDB, IFAD, IFC, IFRCS (associate), ILO, IMF, IMO, Interpol, IOC, IOM, ISO, ITU, NAM (observer), NSG, OAS (observer), OIC, OPCW, OSCE, PFP, SCO, UN, UNCTAD, UNESCO, UNIDO, UPU, WCL, WFTU, WHO, WIPO, WMO, WToO, WTrO (observer)

== See also ==
- Government of Kazakhstan
