= Amirjan Qosanov 2019 presidential campaign =

Amirjan Qosanov for President
- Campaign: 2019 Kazakh presidential election
- Candidate: Amirjan Qosanov; Journalist; General Secretary of Azat Party (2009–2013); First Deputy Chairman of JUS-DP (2006–2009); Deputy Chairman of Republican People's Party (1998–2001)
- Affiliation: Ult Tagdyry
- Status: Announced; 9 April 2019; Official nominee 26 April 2019; Lost election 9 June 2019
- Headquarters: Atyrau
- Slogan(s): Ұлт тағдыры - ұлттық құндылықтар ("Destiny of the nation - national values")

Amirjan Qosanov, a Kazakh journalist and opposition politician expressed his interest on 9 April 2019 in joining the race, believing a chance of possible fair election being held under Acting President Kassym-Jomart Tokayev. On 26 April, Qosanov announced his bid for presidency for the Ult Tagdyry political association where he was unanimously nominated by the group. Qosanov became a registered candidate by the Central Election Commission. On 12 May 2019, Qosanov's campaign officially published the electoral platforms on the website.

== Platforms ==
- Ending corruption
- Reducing the powers of a president
- Allowing direct elections of akims
- Diversifying Kazakh economy
- Prohibiting the construction of nuclear power plants
- End restrictions in political scenes
- Ensuring fair elections in local and general
- Allowing freedom of speech
- Strengthen the role of the Kazakh language
- Complete decommunization and de-Sovietization of in public mind
- Limit monopolies with promotion of business competition

== Foreign policy ==
In regards towards foreign policy, Qosanov stated that "I am one of the organizers of the republican meeting, which was against the entry of Kazakhstan into the Eurasian Economic Union. We believe this union is unequal. For all economic and military parameters, one country dominates there - Russia. We have always advocated good-neighborly relations with Russia, but on equal terms. Therefore, being in a single alliance with a country that is much larger than us cannot be effective and useful for our country. Speaking about rapprochement with the European Union, we are talking primarily about the European Western standards of democracy, competitive political life, turnover of power, freedom of speech, control of government institutions, and a civilized liberal economy."

== Campaign ==
Qosanov visited several regions and cities such as Petropavl, Karaganda, Almaty, and Kostanay. In his official visit to Pavlodar, he called it an industrial region where it has economic potential. "Therefore, such issues as employment and social protection are relevant here. Many questions were asked about the role of educators in the modern world" he said.

Despite being considered as an opposition, many other groups and parties called for boycott in the elections and accused of Qosanov being compromised by the government. In responds to those complains Qosanov responded that "First, every citizen has the right to boycott. But every political organization is not a citizen. This is an organization with its own burden of responsibility [which] must measure it out, cut it off once before making a boycott. I would understand if it was a collective, solidarity, organized, powerful boycott. Perhaps I would then join as one of the participants in the democratic process. I don't see that. More I see a desire to get away from routine campaigning work, a lack of finance and appropriate resources to participate in this. More I see something personal about me. Now my former comrades-in-arms, with whom I went to the rallies, are mocking and burning me. I personally do not understand this. Perhaps I can admit that there is some kind of envy and jealousy, because whether they like it or not, this campaign allows me to consolidate the protest electorate. People turn to me - from super radicals to centrists, from hawks from opposition to doves from opposition. I get satisfaction, pleasure from this work, because I haven't worked with the electorate so purposefully for a long time."

Throughout his campaign, Qosanov held live streams on social media where spoke in Russian and Kazakh about his platforms to the public.

In an interview to the Current Time, Qosanov already expressed doubts that the election would be conducted fairly, in which he promised of his condemnation of results if any violations were reported.
