= Sadibek Tügel 2019 presidential campaign =

Sadibek Tügel for President
- Campaigned for: 2019 Kazakh presidential election
- Candidate: Sadibek Tügel; Chairman of the Uly Dala Qyrandary (2011–present)
- Affiliation: Uly Dala Qyrandary
- Status: Announced; 22 April 2019; Official nominee 22 April 2019; Lost election 9 June 2019
- Slogan: Ұлағатты ұрпақ — ұлттық ұстаным! ("A great generation, national principle!")

On 22 April 2019, Chairman of Uly Dala Qyrandary Sadibek Tügel nominated himself as candidate for the presidential elections, making him one of the first participants to do so. He became registered candidate on 3 May 2019 after gathering more than 120,000 signatures from 15 regions in Kazakhstan. On 11 May, he published his election platform on his website.

== Policies ==
- Improving the country’s demographics
- Supporting the return of Kazakh diaspora
- Strengthening Kazakh language
- Modernizing and developing the Alash ideals
- Ending corruption
- Solving unemployment issue
- Nationalization of natural resources
- Introducing a Bey Council
- Implementation of a new Kazakh Constitution

=== Economic policy ===
Tügel's campaign stated that “all natural resources of the Kazakh land are considered the property of our people. Therefore, the assets in the hands of foreigners must be nationalized, the funds withdrawn abroad must be returned." He also called for each citizen to be provided an additional annual income.

== Campaign ==
Tügel's campaign was built on conservatism, where he called on the nation to preserve its national values and traditions and reject any western influence. To demonstrate it, he visited Kenesary Khan's cave in the Burabay National Park where he mentioned that "Kenesary Khan is not only the last of the khans in the history of the Kazakhs, but also an outstanding personality who took a place in the heart of his people thanks to persistence and high spirit." Tügel called for closure of night clubs, saying that Kazakhstan needs a "highly moral and active generation" by suggesting to create a "morality police". He also proposed in Kazakhstani citizens being banned from marrying foreigners to which he called it a threat to "Kazakh gene pool" and oblige citizens to create families before reaching the age of 25 as a way raising the demography in the country.

On 21 May 2019, Tügel met with Representatives of the scientific community, journalists, invited guests. From there, he gave his campaign speech saying "our duty is to pass on to the younger generation the enduring spiritual values, national traditions and customs that come from our ancestors, to preserve peace and stability in the country. How we educate young people today, this will be the fate of our country."
