= Resignation of Nursultan Nazarbayev =

2019 resignation of the President of Kazakhstan

- Nazarbayev delivering the speech in March 2019
- Date: 19 March 2019; 7 years ago
- Time: 19:00 (Astana Time, UTC+06:00)
- Duration: 27 minutes
- Venue: Akorda Residence, Astana, Kazakhstan
- Location: Astana, Kazakhstan
- Cause: Voluntary resignation
- Participants: Nursultan Nazarbayev
- Footage: Address of the Head of State Nursultan Nazarbayev to the People of Kazakhstan
- Website: Akorda.kz

On 19 March 2019, Nursultan Nazarbayev, the first president of Kazakhstan, announced in a televised address that he would step down from the presidency after almost three decades in power. Having led the republic since before independence in 1991, his decision was regarded as the end of an era in Kazakhstan's modern history. In his speech, Nazarbayev declared that the time had come for "a new generation of leaders" to take responsibility for the country's further development, while stressing that he would continue to contribute to the state and people in other capacities.

Although resigning from the presidency, Nazarbayev retained wide influence. He remained Chairman of the Security Council, leader of the ruling Nur Otan party and held the constitutional title of Elbasy (Leader of the Nation), which provided him with legal status and political authority. The following day, Senate chairman Kassym-Jomart Tokayev assumed office as acting president and proposed to rename the capital Astana to Nur-Sultan in Nazarbayev's honor.

The resignation was met with both surprise and cautious interpretation. Supporters emphasized the managed and orderly nature of the transition, noting its importance for preserving stability, while critics argued that Nazarbayev’s continuing powers limited the scope of real change. Nevertheless, the step was recognized as a historic moment, marking a transition of leadership while maintaining continuity of the political system built during Nazarbayev's long rule.

== Background ==
Nursultan Nazarbayev became the first president of Kazakhstan in 1991, following the country's independence from the Soviet Union. Under his leadership, Kazakhstan experienced significant economic growth, particularly in the energy sector. However, his tenure was also characterized by authoritarian governance, suppression of political opposition, and restrictions on press freedom. In 2010, Nazarbayev was granted the title of Elbasy ("Leader of the Nation"), which conferred lifelong immunity and a continuing prominent role in national affairs.

In early 2019, Kazakhstan experienced rising social discontent, with protests in Astana and other cities over low wages, unemployment, and limited social support. The tragic deaths of five children from a single family in an Astana house fire further escalated these demonstrations, underscoring the hardships faced by low-income families and their demands for better childcare, housing, and social assistance. In response to the growing public dissatisfaction, Prime Minister Bakhytjan Sagintayev resigned, and on 21 February 2019, Nazarbayev dismissed the government and appointed Asqar Mamin as the new Prime Minister.

Meanwhile, in preparation for a smooth transfer of power, Nazarbayev approached the Constitutional Council of Kazakhstan on 1 February 2019 to clarify the legal procedures for early termination of presidential powers, describing it as an "absolutely routine issue of the state." On 15 February, the Constitutional Council issued Resolution No. 1, confirming that the grounds for early termination of the President's powers are not limited and that the President may resign voluntarily by his own will.

== Announcement ==
On the eve of Nowruz, Nursultan Nazarbayev delivered his resignation speech on 19 March 2019 at 19:00 Astana Time at the Akorda Residence. In his televised address, broadcast live on republican channels, he spoke in Kazakh and Russian.

In the 27-minute speech, he reflected on the post-Soviet challenges that the country faced, including economic collapse, infrastructure deficiencies, and social upheaval. He highlighted the achievements of his tenure: the growth of the economy, modernization of institutions, the development of human capital through education programs like Bolashak, and the creation of the new capital, Astana.

He emphasized his commitment to a generational transition of leadership, while assuring the nation that he would remain involved in governance through his continuing roles as Elbasy, Chairman of the Security Council, and head of the Nur Otan party.

I have made a difficult decision for myself — to resign from the powers of the President of the Republic of Kazakhstan. As the founder of an independent Kazakhstan, I see my future task in ensuring the coming to power of a new generation of leaders who will continue the transformation being carried out in the country. As you know, our laws give me the status of the First President – Elbasy (Leader of the Nation). I remain the Chairman of the Security Council, which is vested with serious powers. I remain the Chairman of the Nur Otan party, a member of the Constitutional Council. That is to say, I am staying with you. The concerns of the country and the people remain my concerns.

— Nursultan Nazarbayev, Address of the Head of State to the People of Kazakhstan, 19 March 2019, Official transcript on Akorda.kz

== Reactions ==
Observers interpreted Nazarbayev's resignation as a carefully managed transition rather than a loss of influence. Yevgeny Zhovtis, director of the Kazakhstan Bureau for Human Rights, noted that Nazarbayev left the presidency "quite beautifully", voluntarily and while still in working condition, emphasizing that the resignation preserved the stability of the existing power structure.

Journalist and human rights activist Andrei Sviridov observed that "not all power has passed to Tokayev, but only the position", highlighting that the resignation transferred formal authority while Nazarbayev retained influence through other roles. Similarly, Russian political scientist Arkady Dubnov described the resignation as part of a clear transition scenario, with Nazarbayev stepping down from the presidency while keeping the chairmanship of the Security Council, ensuring continuity of leadership and policy. Dubnov compared this arrangement to Deng Xiaoping's post-presidential influence in China.

Domestic experts also emphasized the stabilizing effect of the resignation. Erlan Qarin of the Kazakhstan Council on International Relations argued that leaving office while maintaining high popularity demonstrated Nazarbayev's strategic foresight and reassured citizens and investors about the continuity of Kazakhstan's political course. Zhaksylyk Sabitov of the Institute of World Economy and Politics noted that the resignation calmed concerns over the country's political future. Zhumabek Sarabekov called the decision "truly historic", framing it as a step to ensure optimal conditions for strengthening Kazakhstan's statehood.

At the same time, opposition figures interpreted the resignation as an opportunity for reform. Akejan Kajegeldin, former prime minister and a long-time critic of Nazarbayev, argued that stepping down should pave the way for a parliamentary system with accountable governance, while Burikhan Nurmukhamedov highlighted that the move set the stage for the December 2020 presidential elections under constitutional procedures. In an interview with Radio France Internationale, opposition leader Mukhtar Ablyazov described Nazarbayev's resignation as largely symbolic, noting that by retaining control of the Security Council, he continued to hold the levers of power. Ablyazov argued that the redistribution of authority could destabilize the political system and accelerate social unrest, warning that accumulated public dissatisfaction might "burst very quickly".

The announcement of Nazarbayev's resignation also drew responses from political party leaders. Azat Peruaşev, deputy of the Mäjilis and chairman of the Aq Jol party, broke into tears when recalling the start of Nazarbayev's presidency, a moment that went viral online and sparked mixed reactions. He later said the emotions were genuine, reflecting the end of an era and his personal memories of Kazakhstan's late Soviet struggles.

=== International ===
==== Russia ====
Russian President Vladimir Putin was among the first foreign leaders to comment, calling Kazakhstan "the closest ally of Russia." He praised Nazarbayev as an initiator of Eurasian integration and a founder of the Eurasian Economic Union, thanking him for his "joint work" and wishing him health and success, while expressing hope for continuity in bilateral relations. Russian Prime Minister Dmitry Medvedev paid tribute in a Facebook post, praising Nazarbayev as the architect of modern Kazakhstan, the founder of Eurasian integration, and a key partner in strengthening Kazakhstan–Russia relations.

Other Russian officials emphasized both the significance of the moment and the expectation of stability. Federation Council chairwoman Valentina Matvienko called the resignation "unexpected and very serious", describing Nazarbayev as a "wise and balanced politician". Prominent TV presenter Vladimir Solovyov, however, suggested that "not everything is clear, not everything is simple" about Nazarbayev's decision, noting that "many issues had been brewing for a long time". Sergei Tsekov of the Federation Council stressed that Kazakhstan's foreign policy, particularly toward Russia, would not change, while State Duma deputy Leonid Kalashnikov called the decision a "balanced act" marking the end of an era. Leonid Slutsky, chairman of the State Duma's International Affairs Committee, hailed him as "the patriarch of Eurasian integration" and one of the most authoritative leaders in the post-Soviet space.

Reactions outside government circles were more varied. LDPR leader Vladimir Zhirinovsky welcomed Nazarbayev's resignation, comparing it to Boris Yeltsin's departure in 1999 and arguing that renewal after 35 years in power was inevitable. At the same time, he warned of U.S. influence and clan struggles in Kazakhstan, while recalling his own ties to the republic that had once led to him being declared persona non grata. Analysts and commentators such as Yuri Solozobov and Nikita Mendkovich described the resignation as a carefully prepared "transit of power" aimed at preserving stability, while others, including Alexander Baunov and Sergei Yastrzhembsky, drew parallels with Russian politics and Yeltsin's exit from power.

==== United States ====
The United States Department of State issued a statement welcoming a "peaceful and constitutional transfer of power" but encouraged continued democratic reforms. Analysts observed that the U.S. would be closely monitoring the political developments in Kazakhstan.

== Aftermath and succession ==
Following Nazarbayev's resignation, Kassym-Jomart Tokayev, Chairman of the Senate, assumed the role of acting president on 20 March 2019, in accordance with the Constitution. Tokayev announced snap presidential elections scheduled for 9 June 2019. He was nominated as the candidate for the ruling Nur Otan party and won the election with 71% of the vote, officially becoming the second President of Kazakhstan.

== See also ==
- Nursultan Nazarbayev
- 2018–2020 Kazakh protests
- Politics of Kazakhstan
