= Qosanov =

Qosanov is a surname. Notable people with the surname include:

- Amirjan Qosanov (born 1964), Kazakh politician
- Erlan Qoşanov (born 1962), Kazakh politician
