= Tügel =

Tügel is a surname. Notable people with the surname include:

- Gülcan Tügel (born 2000), Turkish handballer
- Sadibek Tügel (born 1955), Kazakh writer
