= 2019 Kazakh presidential election =

Presidential election held in Kazakhstan

- 9 June 2019
- Turnout: 77.54% (▼17.67pp)
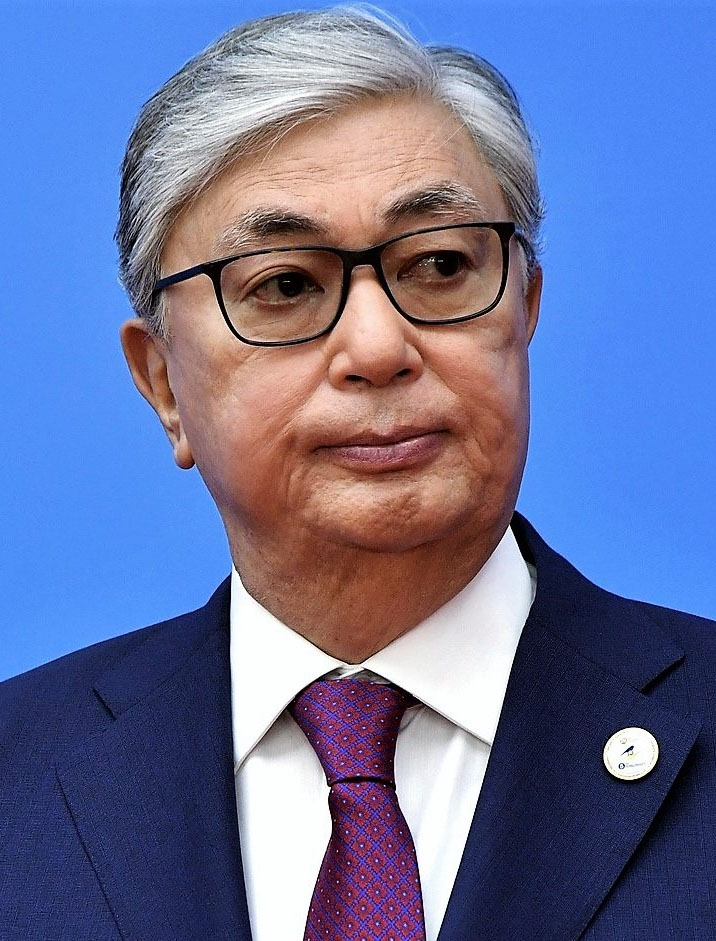

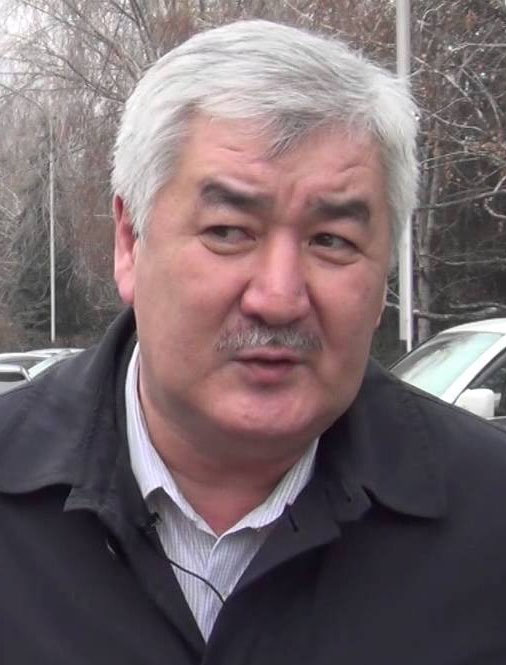

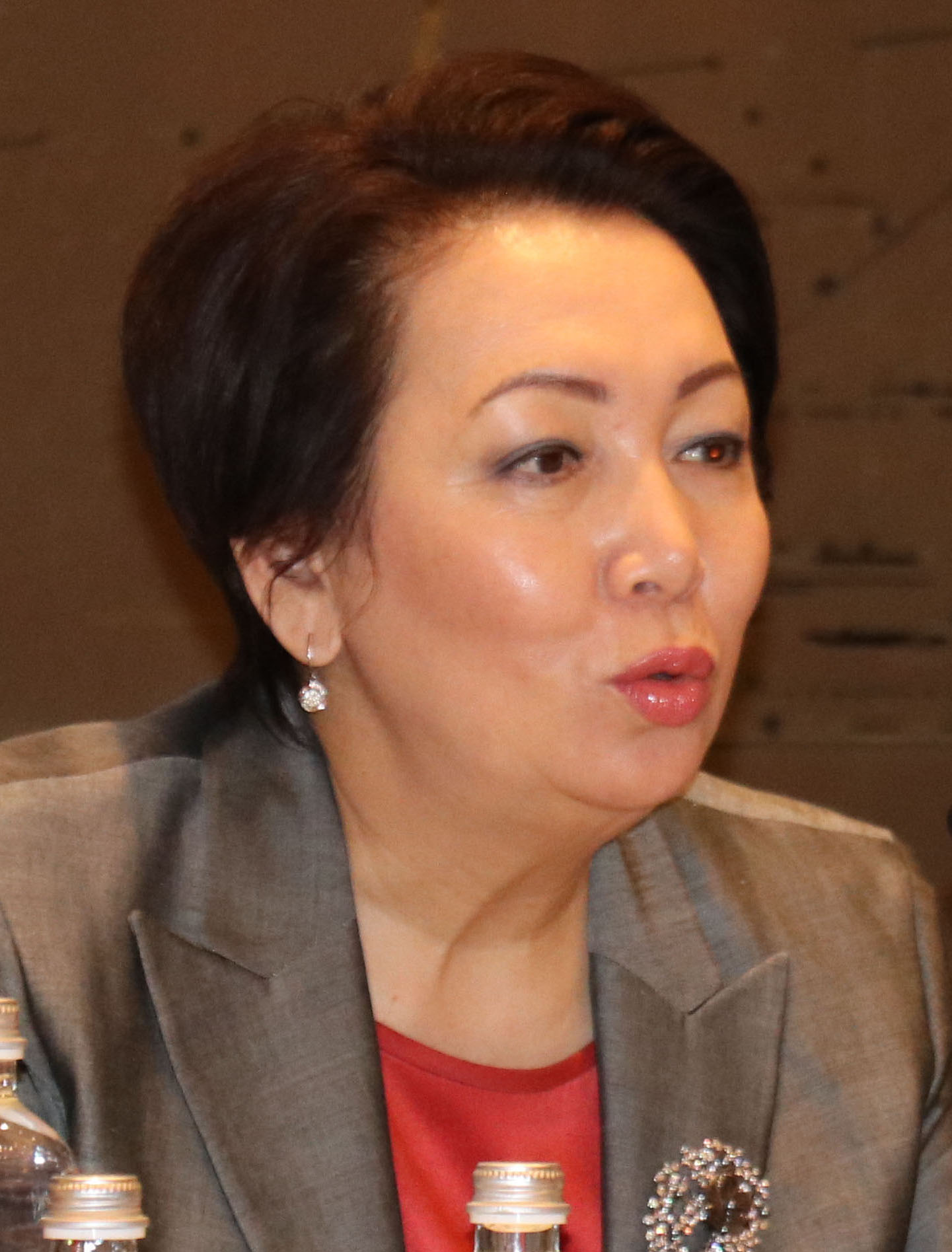
Nominee	Kassym-Jomart Tokayev	Amirjan Qosanov	Dania Espaeva
Party	Nur Otan	Ult Tagdyry (Note: Independent; endorsed by a registered political party, political alliance, or public association.)	Aq Jol
Popular vote	6,539,715	1,495,401	465,714
Percentage	70.96%	16.23%	5.05%
- Results by region
President before election
Kassym-Jomart Tokayev (acting)
Nur Otan
Elected President
Kassym-Jomart Tokayev
Nur Otan

Snap presidential elections were held in Kazakhstan on 9 June 2019 to elect the President of Kazakhstan following the resignation of long-term President Nursultan Nazarbayev in March 2019. This was the sixth presidential election held since Kazakhstan's independence. The elections were not free nor fair, and were widely denounced as a sham. Acting president Kassym-Jomart Tokayev of Nur Otan won the election.

Originally scheduled for December 2020, when President Nursultan Nazarbayev's fifth term was set to expire, the snap elections were announced on 9 April 2019, shortly after acting president Kassym-Jomart Tokayev assumed office following Nazarbayev's resignation amidst anti-government protests.

Nominations took place following the announcement of elections. Nine candidates expressed their interest, of which seven registered, making it the election with the largest number of presidential candidates in Kazakhstan's history. The nominees from political parties and public associations were acting president Kassym-Jomart Tokayev, who became a candidate for the ruling Nur Otan after endorsement from his predecessor Nazarbayev, Amirjan Qosanov from the Ult Tagdyry movement, Jambyl Ahmetbekov from the Communist People's Party, Toleutai Raqymbekov from the Auyl People's Democratic Patriotic Party, Amangeldi Taspihov from the Federation of Trade Unions, Sadibek Tügel from the Uly Dala Qyrandary and Dania Espaeva from Aq Jol, the first Kazakh woman to officially participate in elections.

Campaigning was focused on the issues of agriculture, environment, labour rights, social benefits, the market economy, the legacy of Nazarbayev's policies and the current political system, in which presidential candidates proposed solutions from further democratization and decommunization to the development of the nation's values and agricultural industry.

Tokayev's victory was marked as the first peaceful transition of power in Kazakhstan's history, despite challenges resulting from the political unrest that took place in the streets of Almaty and Nur-Sultan. According to the Organization for Security and Co-operation in Europe (OSCE), "significant irregularities were observed on election day, including cases of ballot box stuffing, and a disregard of counting procedures meant that an honest count could not be guaranteed." "There were widespread detentions of peaceful protesters on election day in major cities", said the OSCE in their Statement of Preliminary Findings and Conclusions.

On 12 June 2019, Tokayev was sworn as president during a ceremony at the Palace of Independence in the capital, Nur-Sultan. From there, he pledged to protect the interests of every citizen and consider any proposals and initiatives that would be put forward by political and community leaders.

== Background ==
=== Re-election of Nazarbayev and post-economic crisis recovery ===
President Nursultan Nazarbayev was elected for a fifth term in the 2015 Kazakh presidential election in the midst of an economic crisis. From there, he pledged economic reforms, political stability, inter-ethnic accord and social cohesion. Nevertheless, the Kazakh economy continued following the downward spiral caused by the 2010s oil glut and devaluation of the tenge to the point of Nazarbayev calling for a snap parliamentary election in January 2016 amidst fears of another oil price crash which would have severely impacted the economy. By the end of that year, Kazakhstan's GDP reached its lowest point of $137.3 billion with a 1.1% growth rate, making it the worst performance since 1998.

However, things took a drastic turn the following year mainly due to the increase of the price of oil and the launch of the Kashagan Field which increased the output production of petroleum. Other economic activity such as in manufacturing, agriculture, transport, and trade sectors also experienced a regrowth. By the end of 2017, the GDP growth rate In Kazakhstan amounted to 4.1% and since then has remained stable from there.

=== Speculations of post-Nazarbayev succession ===
In September 2016, Nazarbayev reshuffled several cabinet positions and appointed his daughter Dariga Nazarbayeva to the post of Deputy Prime Minister, believed to be due to Uzbek President Islam Karimov's unexpected death who had no clear successor which led to a speculation of Nazarbayev's potential moves in having his daughter succeed him. In a November 2016 interview to the Bloomberg News, Nazarbayev said that he had no plans in handing over his succession to his children and mentioned that any transfer of power in the country is carried out by the Constitution.

In May 2018, the Parliament approved a bill which granted Nazarbayev life tenure as Chairman of the Security Council of Kazakhstan. This granted him the control of the country's policies without holding the presidential office. Chair of the Senate Kassym-Jomart Tokayev, in an interview with the BBC in June 2018, expressed doubts that Nazarbayev would seek another term in the election that would have been held in 2020. This created speculation that Nazarbayev was preparing to leave the presidency.

Speculation on Nazarbayev's early resignation rearose on 4 February 2019, when he appealed to the Constitutional Council in regards to the provision on the early termination of the president's powers. Nazarbayev clarified that the appeal was an "absolutely routine issue", claiming that he was repeatedly asked on the provisions and that his appeal to the council was simply an explanatory issue. As a result, Nazarbayev urged public calm.

On 19 March 2019, Nazarbayev announced his resignation, stating that Senate Chair Kassym-Jomart Tokayev would take over as acting president for the remainder of his term. However, on 9 April 2019, Tokayev announced that a snap election would be held on 9 June to avoid "political uncertainty."

== Electoral system ==
The President of Kazakhstan is elected using the two-round system; if more than two presidential candidates are on the ballot and no-one receives a majority of the vote in the first round, a second round is held between the top two candidates no later than two months after the first round is held. If the presidential election is declared null and void or has not determined the winner, then the Central Election Commission (CEC) may schedule a re-run election no later than two months after an initial vote is held.

According to Article 41 of the Constitution, a citizen of Kazakhstan by birth must be at least 40 years old, have a minimum of five years of experience working in public service or elected positions, be fluent in the state language and have been a resident of Kazakhstan for the last 15 years to be elected and serve as president. The right in nominating presidential candidates under Article 55 of the Constitutional Law "On Elections" is reserved only for registered republican public associations.

Article 51 of the Constitutional Law "On Elections" establishes the first Sunday of December as a general date for the presidential election. Therefore regular elections would have taken place on 6 December 2020 as Nazarbayev's five-year elected term from 2015 was set to end by then.

== Candidates ==
Nine candidates applied to the Central Election Commission to contest the elections. A record seven were registered to run, whilst one candidate withdrew and one was disqualified for not possessing sufficient knowledge of the Kazakh language.

A newly adopted law in 2017 made any contesting candidate to be required to have a higher education and five years of experience in the public service or in elected public office as well as an active participations in management of the affairs of the state directly and through their representatives, apply personally, and send individual and collective appeals to state and local governments.

=== Registered candidates ===
Candidates were required to collecting signatures of at least 1% of voters, equally representing at least 2/3 of the regions, cities of republican significance and the capital Nur-Sultan. As of 1 January 2019, 11,814,019 citizens were included by the Central Election Commission (OSK) in the voter registration, thus 118,140 signatures would be needed to be collected in support of each candidate. The registration of proxies, as well as the procedure for verifying the authenticity of signatures with the participation of passport authorities, is carried out by Territorial Election Commissions.

To be registered as presidential candidates, the nominees will need to submit to the CEC a certificate of the state revenue authority on the submission of the income and property declaration by him/her and the spouse as of the first day of the nomination month, i.e. on 1 April 2019, as well as a medical report on the state of his/her health. The candidate registration will last until 6:00 pm May 11 of this year. The candidate registration can be canceled by the CEC in case of detection by the state revenue authorities of the unreliability of information on income and property in the submitted declarations.

Candidate, political party	Political party	Campaign logo	Occupation	Registration date
Jambyl Ahmetbekov Campaign	QKHP		Member of the Mazhilis (2012–present) Secretary of the Communist People's Party of Kazakhstan (2007–2020)	6 May 2019
Dania Espaeva Campaign	Aq Jol		Member of the Mazhilis (2016–present)	4 May 2019
Amirjan Qosanov Campaign	Ult Tagdyry		Journalist	6 May 2019
Toleutai Raqymbekov Campaign	Auyl		Chairman of the Board of the National Agrarian Scientific and Educational Center (2019–present) Vice Minister of Agriculture (2017)	6 May 2019
Amangeldi Taspihov Campaign	Federation of Trade Unions of Kazakhstan		Chairman of the Territorial Association of Trade Unions of West Kazakhstan Region; Member of the Mazhilis (2004–2007)	4 May 2019
Kassym-Jomart Tokayev Campaign	Nur Otan		President of Kazakhstan (2019–present); Chairman of the Senate of Kazakhstan (2007–2011 and 2013–2019); Director-General of the United Nations Office at Geneva (2011–2013); Minister of Foreign Affairs (2002–2007); Prime Minister of Kazakhstan (1999–2002)	3 May 2019
Sadibek Tügel Campaign	Uly Dala Qyrandary		First Vice President of the Association of National Sports of Kazakhstan; President of the Equestrian Federation of Kazakhstan Chairman of Uly Dala Qyrandary (2011–present)	3 May 2019

=== Unsuccessful nominees ===
- Talgat Yergaliyev (Union of Builders of Kazakhstan), a former Member of the Mazhilis. Withdrew his candidacy.
- Jumatai Aliev (Halyq Demografiasy), Rector of Central Asian University. Rejected due to a failed Kazakh language test.

=== Nominations ===
Nomination of presidential candidates were held from 10 April to 28 April 2019. According to the Article 55 of the Constitutional Act "On elections", only registered public associations and political parties have a given right to nominate their candidates.

The decision on nomination is taken by a majority of votes from the total number of members of the highest body of the republican public association. The compliance of a candidate with the requirements of the Constitution and the Constitutional Act "On Elections" is carried out by the Central Election Commission within five days from the date of submission of an extract from the protocol of the meeting of the highest body of the republican public association after nominating the candidate, together with the candidate's consent to run for presidency and a document confirming that the candidate has paid the electoral contribution.

==== Uly Dala Qyrandary (UDQ) ====
On 17 April 2019, the public association Uly Dala Qyrandary nominated its co-chair and writer Sadibek Tügel for presidency. The nomination received no cover from the media and instead were a series of social media posts. Tügel pledged to promote ideas of spiritual revival and raising of Kazakh culture and focus on the importance of improvements in the socio-cultural sphere that were made possible under Nazarbayev's presidency.

According to political analysts Orazğali Selteev, he described Tügel as the "1% candidate" (referring to how much vote share he'd get) whose a "harmless participant, with no pretensions."

==== Nur Otan (NO) ====
Shortly after President Nursultan Nazarbayev's resignation, some talks arose that Nazarbayev's daughter, Dariga, who succeeded Tokayev as the Chair of the Senate, was expected to run in the election as a way to ensure her father's legacy. However, Dariga stated that she had no plans in joining the race. Other possible contender included Imangali Tasmagambetov.

On 23 April 2019, the 19th Nur Otan Extraordinary Congress was held in Nur-Sultan which was attended 1,500 persons, including the 600 delegates. From there, Party Chairman Nursultan Nazarbayev proposed to nominate acting president Kassym-Jomart Tokayev for candidacy, calling him a "well-deserved candidate" that would follow "politics of friendship" and "equal rights of Kazakh citizens". Tokayev was unanimously chosen to be the nominee. From there, Tokayev spoke at the nomination congress, where he praised Nazarbayev and pledged to work hard for the prosperity of the nation. That same day, Tokayev appealed to the Constitutional Council for the clarification on the term of residence in Kazakhstan per electoral requirements during his time of work overseas as diplomat. On 25 April, the Council ruled that the 15-year period of residence also counts the periods of residence outside for Kazakhstani citizens who belong to the staff of the governmental diplomatic service.

===== Potential nominees =====
- Kassym-Jomart Tokayev – Acting President of Kazakhstan since March 2019, Kazakh Senate Chairman from 2007 to 2011, 2013 to 2019, Minister of Foreign Affairs from 1994 to 1999, 2002 to 2007, Prime Minister of Kazakhstan from 1999 to 2002.
- Dariga Nazarbayeva – Chairman of the Kazakh Senate (2019–2019), Deputy Prime Minister of Kazakhstan (2015–2016), Deputy Chairman of the Mazhilis (2014–2015), MP of Mazhilis (2004–2007, 2012–2015), Asar party leader (2003–2006).
- Imangali Tasmagambetov – Kazakh ambassador to Russia (2017–2019), Deputy Prime Minister of Kazakhstan (2016–2017, 2000–2002, 1995–1999), Minister of Defence (2014–2016), Äkim of Nur-Sultan (2008–2014), Äkim of Nur-Sultan (2004–2008), State Secretary of Kazakhstan (2004), head of Presidential Administration of Kazakhstan (2003–2004), 5th Prime Minister of Kazakhstan (2002–2003), Äkim of Atyrau Region (1999–2000).
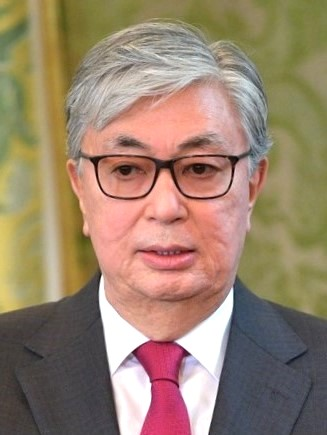
Acting President of Kazakhstan
Kassym-Jomart Tokayev

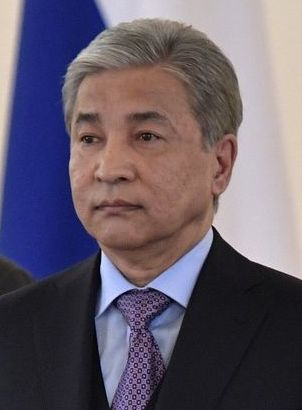
Kazakh ambassador to Russia
Imangali Tasmagambetov

==== Federation of Trade Unions (QRKF) ====
At the meeting of the executive committee of the Federation of Trade Unions of Kazakhstan (QRKF) was held at which the issue of nominating candidates for participation in the elections from the organisation was discussed. The members of the executive committee approved and submitted for consideration by the General Council on 23 April 2019 two candidates: former Mazhilis MP Muqtar Tinikeev and QRKF deputy chairman Amangeldi Taspihov.

The following day on 24 April 2019, the QRKF General Council nominated Taspihov as presidential candidate after Tinikeev recused himself, due to his lack of knowledge of Kazakh per registrational requirement.

==== Ak Zhol Democratic Party (AJ) ====
In regards to snap presidential elections, the Ak Zhol Democratic Party (AJ) Chairman Azat Peruashev expressed Nazarbayev's intent in letting Tokayev serving his unfinished term as "a normal international practice" that "corresponds to the best models of democratic states." From there, he used example of U.S. President Lyndon B. Johnson whom served as president after the assassination of John F. Kennedy before being elected. Nevertheless, Peruashev thanked Tokayev for his decision to hold snap elections, noting his commitment for it to be "transparent and fair".

Amongst the contenders from the party, Talgat Erğaliev and Dania Espaeva were seen as the possible frontrunners. Peruashev refused to join the race, stating that the need for the Ak Zhol to have new faces and competition which would encourage the development of the party.

At the 15th Extraordinary Congress on 24 April 2019, Espaeva received 49.5% of the delegate vote. A decision at the presidium was made to hold the vote without a second round which resulted in Espaeva garnering 170 votes with 15 against, thus becoming the first woman in Kazakhstan's history to be nominated for presidency.

===== Potential nominees =====
- Azat Peruashev – Mazhilis MP since 2012, Ak Zhol Democratic Party chairman since 2011, First Secretary of the Civic Party of Kazakhstan from 1998 to 2006.
- Talgat Erğaliev – Mazhilis MP since 2012, chairman of the Union of Builders from 2010.
- Dania Espaeva – Mazhilis MP since 2016.
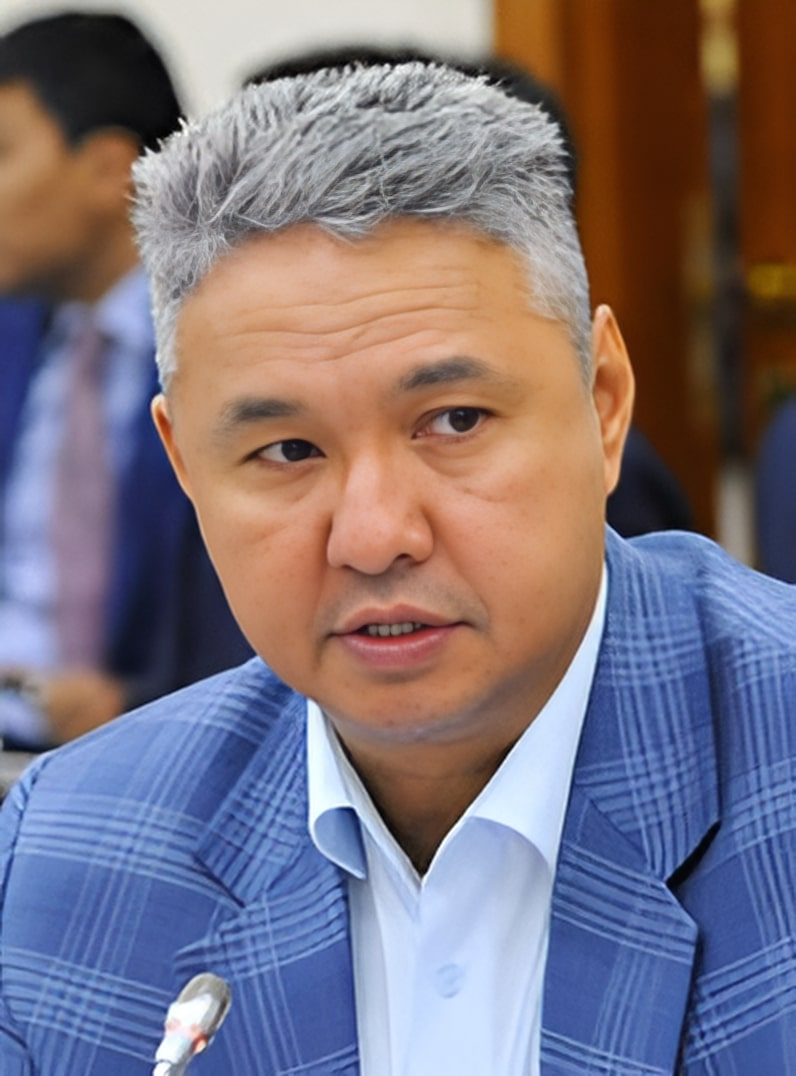
Mazhilis MP
Azat Peruashev

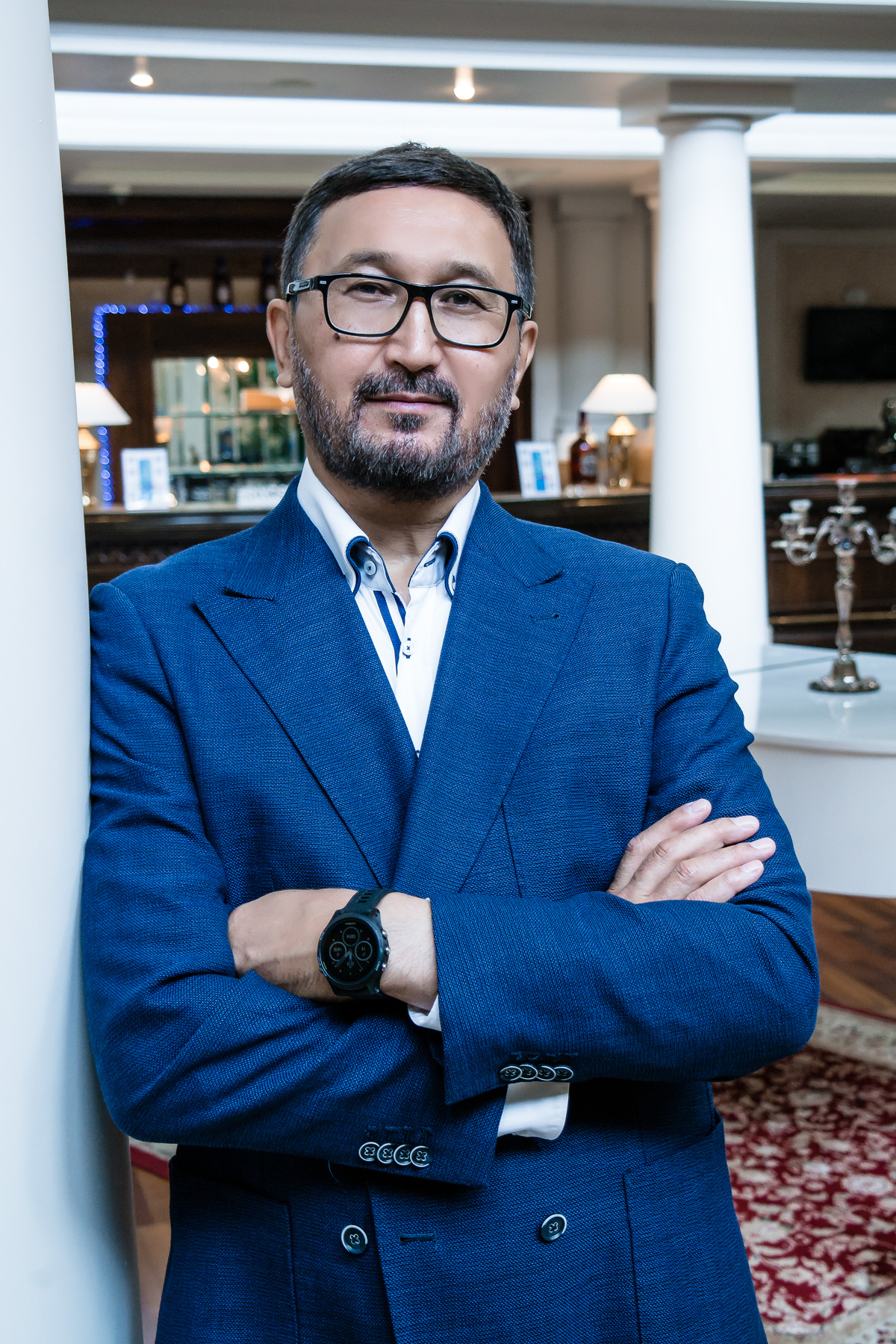
Mazhilis MP
Talgat Erğaliev

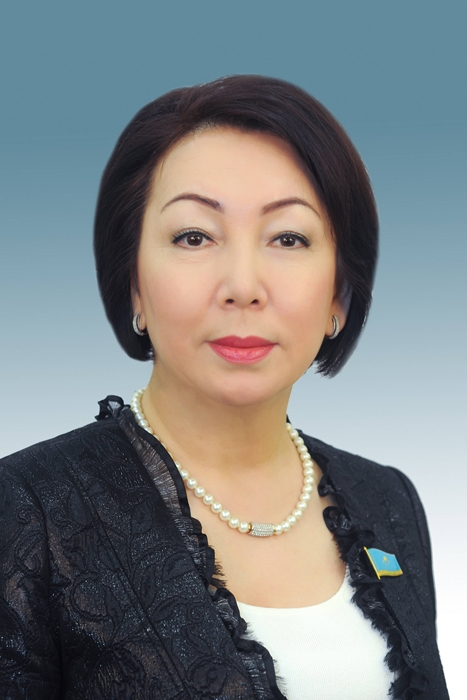
Mazhilis MP
Dania Espaeva

==== Nationwide Social Democratic Party (JSDP) ====
The Nationwide Social Democratic Party (JSDP) subsequently after Nazarbayev's resignation issued a statement which called for fair and open presidential and parliamentary elections, a national dialogue between the authorities and society on the constitutional democratization of the political system, and to ensure the security and stability during peaceful transition of power and after. On 22 April 2019, the JSDP Political Council announced that it would convene in a party congress and proposed Ermurat Bapi as a possible presidential nominee for the JSDP.

On 26 April 2019, the party at the 14th Congress in Almaty announced that it would backdown and not participate in the presidential race in which according to JSDP deputy chairman Ashat Raqymjanov, was due to integrity of their holding and the short time given to prepare and conduct the campaign citing large financial strain. He noted that the party would focus its attention in the next parliamentary elections.

==== Communist People's Party (QKHP) ====
The Communist People's Party of Kazakhstan (QKHP) announced its interest to participate in the election at the party's Politburo meeting. Parliamentary leader QKHP Aiqyn Qongyrov called Tokayev's move as a "logical decision", citing that "people need stability, so that there will be a person who will run the country in the next five years." Qongyrov was highly seen as a possible front-runner from the QKHP. In an interview to Tengrinews.kz, Qongyrov expressed his interest to run for presidency, noting he would rule out his choice based on the party's decision.

At the 14th QKHP Extraordinary Congress, Secretary Jambyl Ahmetbekov, who previously contested in the 2011 presidential election was nominated again by the party in presidential race on 26 April 2019. Qongyrov at the congress, stated that each presidential nominee from the QKHP receives more and more support in which he used examples from the past races starting from 2005 where the party slowly went up its ranking in terms of vote place.

===== Potential nominees =====
- Jambyl Ahmetbekov – Mazhilis MP since 2012, Secretary of the QKHP from 2007.
- Aiqyn Qongyrov – QKHP parliamentary leader since 2018, Secretary of the QKHP from 2013, Mazhilis MP from 2012.
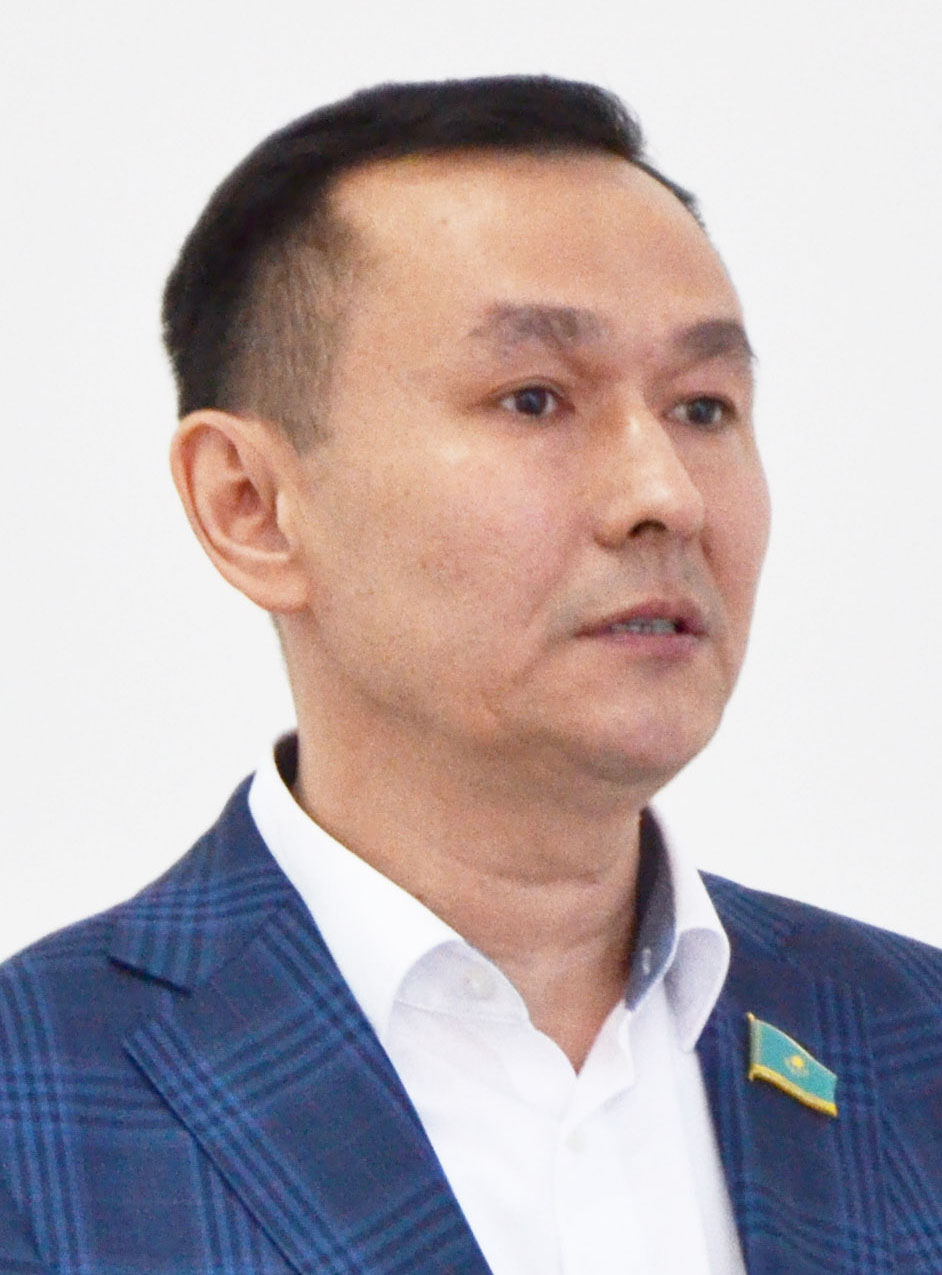
Mazhilis MP and QKHP parliamentary leader
Aiqyn Qongyrov

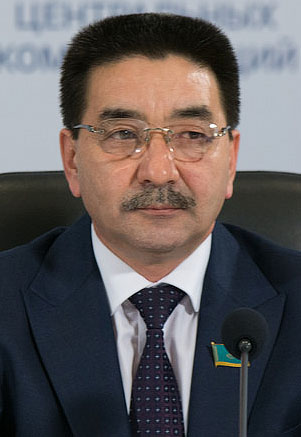
Mazhilis MP Jambyl Ahmetbekov

==== Ult Tagdyry (UT) ====
At the press conference held in Almaty, the public association Ult Tagdyry (UT) nominated Amirjan Qosanov for presidency on 26 April 2019. Despite not being part of the organisation, Qosanov called it an "honour" and, if elected, proposed to hold a constitutional meeting. His nomination by all UT members except for the chairman Dos Koshim who abstained the vote, but called it worth in nominating a candidate.

==== Union of Builders (QQO) ====
Failed Ak Zhol Democratic Party (AJ) nominee and head of Union of Builders of Kazakhstan (QQO) Talgat Erğaliev nominated himself as a presidential candidate for the QQO association and submitted his documents to the Central Election Commission (OSK) for registration on 27 April 2019. However, after pressure from Ak Zhol and its chairman Azat Peruashev whom Erğaliev met with, it was announced on 28 April that Erğaliev would be withdrawing from the race and instead support Dania Espaeva's campaign which received positive remarks from Peruashev himself, calling Erğaliev's act as "solid" and "masculine".

==== Halyq Demografiasy (HD) ====
On 26 April 2019, the Halyq Demografiasy public association nominated its head Jumatai Aliev as candidate for presidency. Aliev submitted his documents to the Central Election Commission (OSK) on 28 April.

== Campaign ==
=== Kassym-Jomart Tokayev ===
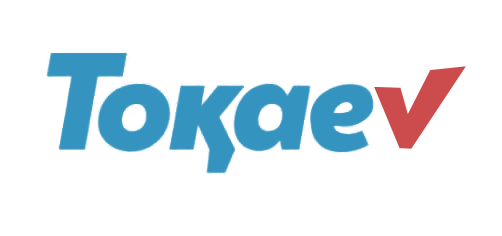

In the start of the campaign, an official electoral programme published in Tokayev's website under the title: "Well-being for all! Continuity. Justice. Progress." which consisted three sections of the platforms with total of 170 outlined tasks. In "Succession", it emphasized strengthening of independence, sovereignty and national security–that is stability, civil peace and harmony. Tokayev called for an increase in incomes and improve the quality of life of the country's citizens. In "Justice", Tokayev stressed the need in creating opportunities for every citizen in order to achieve personal success and improve their well-being. In the "Progress", called for the creative change in society with Tokayev proclaiming progress as being "our idea."

He pledged to continue his predecessor Nursultan Nazarbayev's policies in implementing the social programs, setting path for Kazakhstan's entry into the top 30 most developed countries in the world, to further implement Five Institutional Reforms–Plan of the Nation programme which would bring the nation to a new level of sustainable development, strengthening domestic political stability and social cohesion and stimulating the business activity of the population as well as eliminating intolerance and extremism, strengthen domestic political stability and social harmony, develop civil society, protections of rights, freedoms and legitimate interests of citizens, guaranteed safety of every person, protection of private property, support of domestic business, ensure the security of investments, stimulate the business activity of the population, protect national interests in the political, trade, economic, cultural, humanitarian spheres and implement a balanced, constructive foreign policy.

Tokayev was mocked on social media for the overuse of modification of his official photos, which allegedly erased his wrinkles and double chin.

=== Amirjan Qosanov ===

Amirjan Qosanov became the first opposition candidate since 2005 to contest the presidential race. He called for more political freedoms, national identity, stronger sovereignty, friendlier economy to people, and development of various regions throughout the country. Qosanov brought up several environmental issues which included the drying of Aral Sea and the city of Semey which suffered the impacts of nuclear testing in Semipalatinsk during the Soviet Union. Qosanov pledged to continue the nation's multivector foreign policy although he expressed his support for stronger relations with European Union. He also ran on a platform in fighting against corruption, reducing the powers of the president, allowing direct elections of äkıms (local heads), making the Kazakh economy less dependent on raw resources, and prohibiting the construction of nuclear power plants.

Qosanov was the only candidate to criticise the government. In spire of that, he received backlash and accusations amongst other opposition groups for allegedly collaborating with the authorities such as having campaign staff with a record of having pro-government views and to some extent being supporters of it; Qosanov dismissed these claims as being "rumours". It was viewed that Qosanov wouldn't win the election and instead was being used to legitimise it whilst the opposition called for boycott rather than to support Qosanov in the polls.

=== Dania Espaeva ===

Ak Zhol presidential nominee Dania Espaeva outlined three challenges for her campaign: a market economy, democracy and social justice. Espaeva ran a pro-business platform. Proclaiming herself as "a firm supporter of small and medium-sized businesses", she promoted competition and entrepreneurship and called for a reduction in banking interest rates, end in de-offshorisation and tax rates for important industries such as in mechanical engineering as well as creation of new industries in rural areas. In regards to corruption and low public trust in judicial system, Espaeva obliged to protect citizens from extortion of businesses by the authorities whom she called for them to be held accountable.

Espaeva emphasised Kazakhstan's independence as a key value, telling that "our people, our land and its wealth that we inherited from our ancestors, our state language and the unity of our multinational society." She supported decolonising the public through renaming objects, streets and settlements, required exams on knowledge of the Constitution of Kazakhstan, history and state language for granting Kazakh citizenship, supporting Kazakhstan's traditional religions and protecting society's spiritual sphere from foreign influence.

Throughout the campaign, Espaeva was compared to Margaret Thatcher in social media due to her speeches and proposed policies.

=== Toleutai Raqymbekov ===

Toleutai Raqymbekov, presidential nominee for the agrarian Auyl People's Democratic Patriotic Party, campaigned on two issues: agriculture and tradition. He stressed the issue in Kazakhstan's society where young people are forced to leave villages and move into the cities, creating an unequal composition of the country's population between rural and urban areas. In order to solve this, Raqymbekov proposed to minimise the inequality between urban and rural population by developing rural infrastructure and implementing improvement measures for living standards in village residents by teaching them practical skills to organise their own businesses with a provided access to "long and cheap money", optimising social assistance, improving medical services and determining the main rural development trends and needs.

Raqymbekov mostly campaigned for rural issues and proposed solution in improving agricultural economy by which would help Kazakhstan to compete worldwide with its important exports and noting it would create more jobs in the villages by attracting young specialists and prevent the fleeing into urban cities. He also stated that a modernised Kazakhstan wouldn't be possible taking into account the history and culture of the people, understanding the origins of ethnic development, and its primary spiritual and moral values of culture.

=== Amangeldi Taspihov ===

Amangeldi Taspihov's election platform included five main directives of which were: creating business reforms, ensured safe workplaces, increased workers’ rights, establish higher salaries and the fifth is to re-examine regulations concerning migrant labour.

Taspihov sought to earn support from middle class by campaigning for safe working conditions, labour rights protections and decent living wages for people earning average. He also called for regulation in the job market by having any foreign worker's job whose visa stay has expired by replace by Kazakhstani citizen as well as improvements in education system to train new specialists to work without needing migrant workers. Taspihov took Auyl nominee Toleutai Raqymbekov's similar stance in creating more jobs in rural areas to prevent the outflow of the population. He proposed to develop a Safe Labour state programme that would force employers to create safe workplaces and in turn, they would receive tax benefits and subsidies for infrastructure and that any employer caught violating the code, would be faced with criminal charges.

=== Jambyl Ahmetbekov ===

Communist People's Party of Kazakhstan (QKHP) nominee Jambyl Ahmetbekov's main platforms were on labour and political rights. Ahmetbekov campaigned through populist approach by calling prosecution of oligarchs living abroad, mainly referring to exiled Kazakh businessman Mukhtar Ablyazov whom he accused of stealing government's budget that's used to fund social services. He expressed his support for free education, healthcare, pension payments, and a guaranteed right for work, rest and housing and noted that attention would be paid towards spiritual sphere, science, culture and morality. Ahmetbekov also called for higher taxes on the rich and an end to poverty.

Ahmetbekov criticised westernization, claiming it brought harm to Kazakhstan's society such as pornography and gambling addiction. In combating the situation, Ahmetbekov proposed for Kazakhstan's own version of Facebook in which certain deemed "harming content" would be regulated in spite of his earlier oblige to support freedom of speech, democratic organisations and movements and opposition media in his electoral programme.

=== Sadibek Tügel ===

Sadibek Tügel based his campaign on conservatism and nationalism where talked about the preservation of nation's values and traditions by rejecting western culture. He proposed in implementing a ban on night clubs and marriage to foreigners. Tügel discussed the issues of Kazakhstan's demographics which he obliged for young people aged under 25 to start families.

In political issues, Tügel's platform consisted of nine main points: protecting people's honour and dignity, improving the country's demographics, supporting Kazakh diaspora whom are willing to return, strengthening the role of the Kazakh language, modernisation and development of Alash Autonomy ideologies, end in corruption, fixation in unemployment, death penalty for corrupt officials, nationalisation of resources, as well as a referendum for new Constitution. Tügel positioned himself as reformer and called for democratization within the political system such as the direct elections of äkıms (local heads) in all levels, a national unicameral Parliament in which the candidates for MP's could self-nominate themselves.

=== Others ===
Despite not nominating its candidate, the Nationwide Social Democratic Party (JSDP) called for boycott of the polls as a protest, in which the party members claimed that it is the participation of "puppet" candidates proposed by pro-government parties to help secure an election victory for acting president Kassym-Jomart Tokayev from the ruling Nur Otan party.

Mukhtar Ablyazov, leader of the banned Democratic Choice of Kazakhstan movement, supported the initiative in boycotting the elections, calling them "illegal" and in response, he urged everyone to attend mass protests all over the country during the election day.

On 1 May 2019, at the International Workers' Day, dozens of Kazakhstani citizens took the streets calling for the release of political prisoners and boycott in the upcoming presidential elections. An estimated 80 persons were detained that day.

An organising committee of the People's Kurultai consisting of the Kazakh opposition was formed in the city of Kyiv in Ukraine. From there, the participants called for boycott in the polls, stating that the election is "illegitimate" and that according to political activist Aidos Sadyqov, the purpose of the authorities for elections is to create an "illusion of democracy" within the country and to show the West that there are so forms of alternative choices contrary to more dictatorial countries such as North Korea and neighboring Turkmenistan.

Ermek Narymbai, leader of the Şyndyq-Honesty movement took a different stance regarding the elections. He urged people to vote for opposition Amirjan Qosanov candidate, citing the reason as way to vote against ruling candidate Kassym-Jomart Tokayev although admitting at not being supporter of Qosanov. As for people boycotting, Narymbai called for them to observe the polls which would help them to record the number of participants in the boycott.

== Debates ==
On 14 May 2019, a televised debate was announced between the candidates. It was held on 29 May and was broadcast live on the Khabar TV channel. The cost of the event amounted to 41 million tenge.

Four presidential candidates: Jambyl Ahmetbekov, Amirjan Qosanov, Amangeldi Taspihov and Sadibek Tügel participated in the debates and the rest of the three candidates were represented by Azat Peruashev for Dania Espaeva, Äli Bektaev for Toleutai Raqymbekov, and Mäulen Äşimbaev for Kassym-Jomart Tokayev. The debate was divided into three rounds. In the first round, all participants were asked about the development of the education system in Kazakhstan, in the second round about social modernisation of Kazakhstan, and in the third round, the candidates were allowed to ask questions to two other participants in the debate.

== Controversies ==
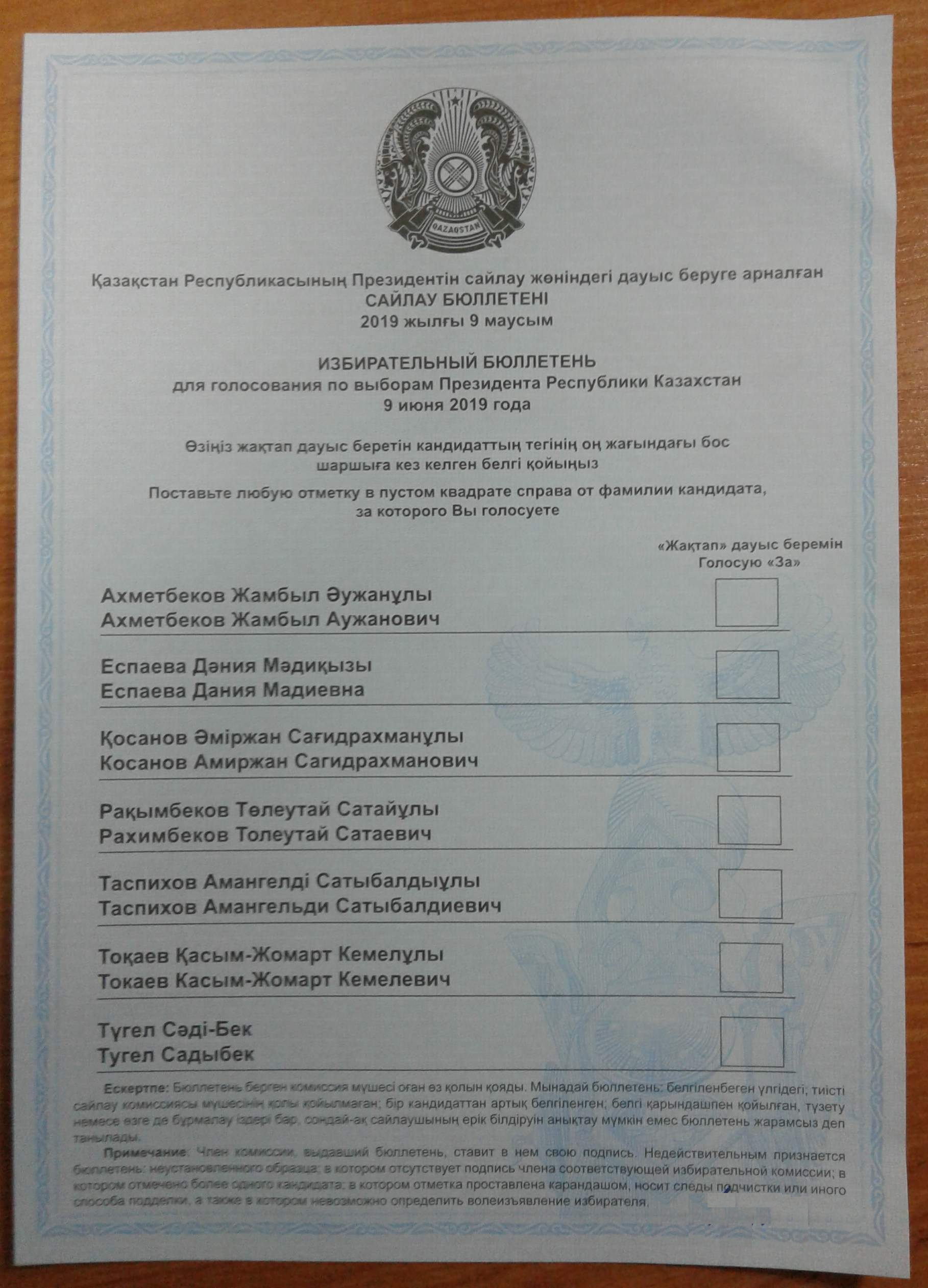
2019 voting ballot for the candidates

=== Preparations and claims of voter pressure ===
As part of the collection of signatures by candidates, violations were observed. In one of the higher educational institutions, it was proposed to sign the sheets on which the candidate's data were not indicated.

In May 2019, The Village agency published an article about receiving anonymous complains by university students in being pressured to vote. According to the statements, many of the campuses postponed the educational semesters to June in expense for students to show up at the polls, otherwise they'd face possible expulsion or systemic academic problems. The Village correspondents attempted to contact the universities for response to the issues in which only the Almaty University of Power Engineering and Telecommunications admitted that the semester postponement–was in fact–due to upcoming elections.

=== Political pressure and crackdowns ===
According to the Kazakh law, it is prohibited to conduct polls that do not meet the requirements. Such violations include conducting them on social media, which two citizens were fined for.

=== Internet blockages ===
On 9 May 2019, at the Victory Day, reports of internet blockages occurred with many news website such as Radio Azattyq and Ferghana Information Agency being inaccessible to the public as well as social media sites such as Facebook, Telegram, YouTube and Instagram. This move occurred allegedly after exiled Kazakh banker and leader of the Democratic Choice of Kazakhstan called on people to protest that day.

Johann Bihr, head of Reporters Without Borders' Eastern Europe and Central Asia desk criticised the incident, telling that "There is no justification for this massive obstruction of the Kazakh public’s right to information." He called on the Kazakh authorities to abandon the "repressive practices from an earlier era" for their reformist discourse to viewed credible, noting that internet censorship is one of the reasons why Kazakhstan is ranked 158th in the Press Freedom Index, a position which gives the nation a "bad international image".

=== Invitations ===
A few days before the elections, all residents of the Republic of Kazakhstan, according to the rules, should have received from the city and regional election commissions a personal paper invitation to the "Presidential Election-2019" with the name of the voter, address and number of the polling station. However, for unknown reasons, many residents of the largest city in the country Almaty did not receive their invitations to the elections for the first time in the entire history of elections.

== Opinion polls ==
On 6 May 2019, the Central Election Commission (OSK) published a notice regarding the reports of political polls being conducted online. The OSK noted that in accordance with the law, it is prohibited to publish reports of electoral polling five days prior to election day and that the right to conducting them was reserved only for two organisations: Qoğamdyq Pıkır Institute and the Jastar Research and Development Center LLP.

According to political scientist Dosym Satpaev, polling within the country can be easily distorted in all levels of government. In his opinion, the reason for the suppression of polls is due to prevent the means of struggle between political elites and to create illusion for the public that the government being viewed with positivity with less distrust of election results due to a lack of independent polling.

== Observation ==
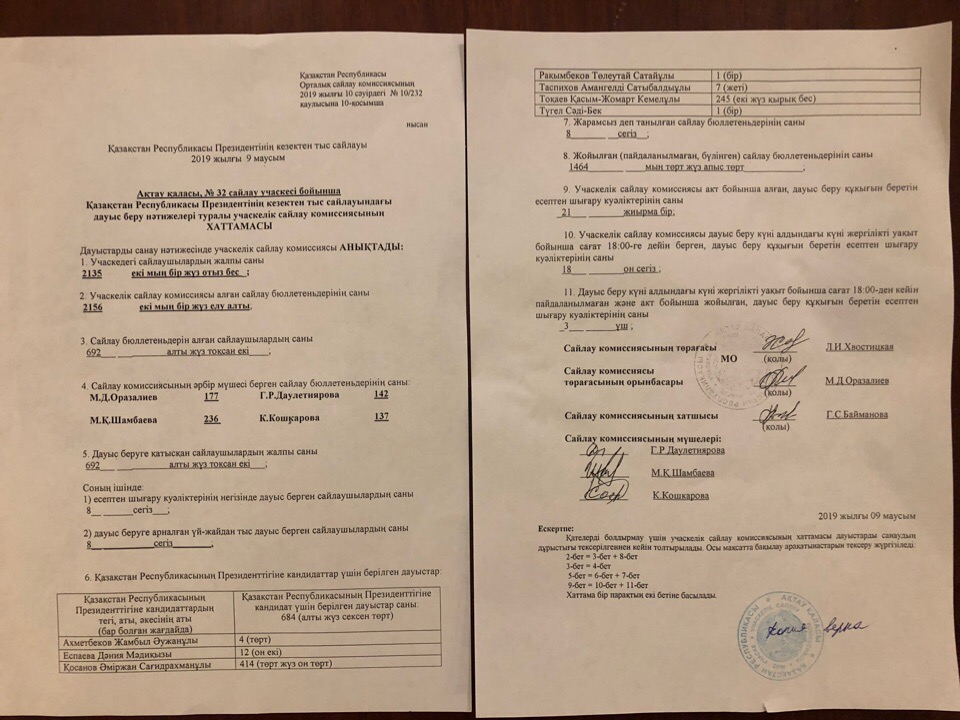
The protocol that was photographed by an international observer from Russia at the 32nd voting precinct in Aktau showing Amirjan Qosanov with 60% (414 votes), and the President of Kazakhstan Kassym-Jomart Tokayev at 35% (245 votes)

As of 6 May 2019, several election observation missions have declared their interest. Amongst them were the CIS, the Interparliamentary Assembly of the CIS Member States, Office for Democratic Institutions and Human Rights of the Organization for Security and Cooperation in Europe (OSCE), the Shanghai Cooperation Organisation and the Organisation of Islamic Cooperation.

On 15 May, for observers from the NGO's of Almaty and 12 ethnocultural centers of the Assembly of People of Kazakhstan, students of city universities, training was conducted on the basis of the civil platform Amanat. In total, it is planned to train at least 10,000 independent observers under this program.

As of 31 May, the number of observers from international organizations and foreign states is 967 people, and the Ministry of Foreign Affairs has accredited 227 foreign correspondents from more than 40 countries of the world.

During the presidential elections, 19 violations were revealed.

=== OSCE ===
On 8 May 2019, the Organization for Security and Co-operation in Europe (OSCE) mission to observe the presidential elections in Kazakhstan was opened. The team of observers, according to the head of the mission, Urszula Gacek, included experts from Great Britain, Spain, Germany, Belarus, Poland, who would work not only before the elections, but also after. A total of 22 long-term observers were registered in the mission.

According to the mission's interim report on 24 May, the election campaign is subtle and limited to campaign posters and billboards. Campaigning is strictly regulated and candidates can hold public meetings or events only with the permission of local authorities, an application for which must be submitted 10 days before the planned event.

=== CIS ===
On 20 May 2019, the mission of the Commonwealth of Independent States (CIS) was opened. According to the CIS executive secretary, Viktor Guminsky, it was assumed that the mission from the CIS will include about 300 observers. They will represent all the countries of the commonwealth. To date, about 90 representatives of the Commonwealth countries have already applied for accreditation. These applications continue to come in. So far, applications have been officially received from four countries: Russia, Belarus, Tajikistan and Turkmenistan, as well as from the IPA CIS. Long-term observers will work with about 20 people from the diplomatic corps accredited in Nur-Sultan, as well as the CIS executive committee.

== Conduct ==
=== Violations ===
During the election day, the Prosecutor General's Office identified 19 revealed violations, and initiated cases of an administrative offense. Of these, 12 violations were related to the issuance of ballots by a member of a precinct election commission to citizens for voting for other persons, 6 violations were related to the fact that some voters wanted to vote instead of another voter. Independent observers and journalists recorded numerous election violations such as stuffing, use of disappearing ink, and voting for other people on video.

== Results ==
Candidate	Party	Votes	%
Kassym-Jomart Tokayev	Nur Otan	6,539,715	70.96
Amirjan Qosanov	Ult Tagdyry	1,495,401	16.23
Dania Espaeva	Ak Zhol Democratic Party	465,714	5.05
Toleutai Raqymbekov	Auyl People's Democratic Patriotic Party	280,451	3.04
Amangeldi Taspihov	Federation of Trade Unions	182,898	1.98
Jambyl Ahmetbekov	Communist People's Party	167,649	1.82
Sadibek Tügel	Uly Dala Qyrandary	84,582	0.92
Total		9,216,410	100.00
Valid votes		9,216,410	99.38
Invalid/blank votes		57,700	0.62
Total votes		9,274,110	100.00
Registered voters/turnout		11,960,364	77.54
Source: CEC

== Aftermath ==
=== Protests ===
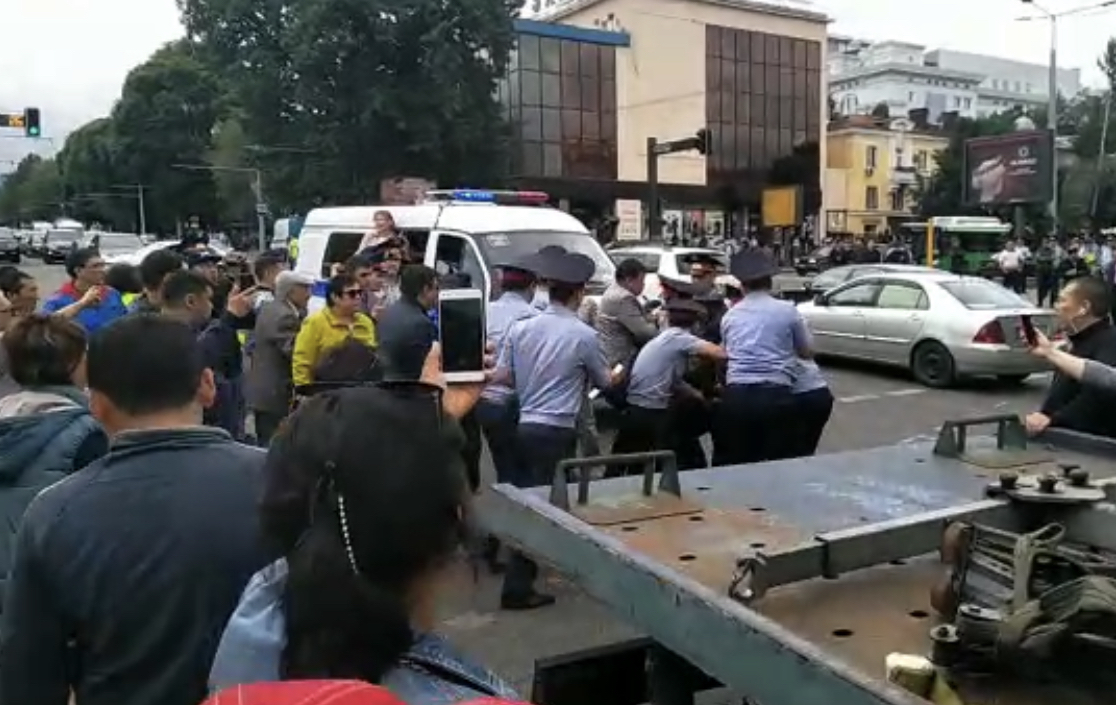
Kazakh police detaining a protester in Almaty, 9 June 2019

After preliminary results were announced, protests were reported in both Nur-Sultan and Almaty, the largest city in Kazakhstan. Deputy Interior Minister Marat Kozhayev announced that 500 people had been taken into custody, while Mukhtar Ablyazov, the leader of opposition group the Democratic Choice of Kazakhstan, claimed that there were "thousands of protesters" in the Astana Square of Almaty.

==== Response by authorities ====
According to the Kazakh government, the protests were caused by attempts to destabilize the social situation on the part of radical elements by organizing and conducting unauthorized actions. The authorities considered the protest actions agitated by foreign "leaders of extremist organizations", referring mainly to the former Kazakh politician and opposition leader Mukhtar Ablyazov and his movement Democratic Choice of Kazakhstan, which was declared as an extremist organization in March 2018. Ablyazov was the first to call for boycott in the election and instead hold a protest. In 2009, the Kazakh authorities charged Ablyazov with abuse and fraud and removed him from his post as head of BTA Bank, causing him to flee the country and was eventually convicted in absentee in the country.

==== Protesters' response ====
The protesters considered the elections to be unfair and undemocratic, and their results were predetermined. They also protested against the change in the name of the capital and the current government, which, in their opinion, is still in the hands of ex-President Nursultan Nazarbayev, and that his successor Kassym-Jomart Tokayev is only his “political puppet”. Ablyazov's supporters believed that the falsely accused him of fraud in order to arrest him due to political reasons and why his movement was declared as illegal in the country.

==== International observers ====
International observers from the OSCE considered that the elections did not demonstrate a democratic authenticity with reported cases of ballot stuffing and that Kazakhstan still needs significant political, social and legal reforms to strengthen democracy, human rights and freedoms, they stated that they are always ready to cooperate with Kazakhstan for carrying out such actions. The observers from the CIS stated that they did not observe any protest actions and detentions, while the OSCE, on the contrary, watched the protests and considered the actions of the Kazakh authorities to be clear violations of the foundations of freedom and democracy and disrespect for their own people. The OSCE observers stayed in Kazakhstan for another week due to concerns about the fate of the protesters.

=== International reactions ===
==== Countries ====
- Armenia – Prime Minister Nikol Pashinyan congratulated Tokayev, wishing him success in implementation of all goals for the "sake of peace, progress and prosperity of the good people of Kazakhstan."
- Azerbaijan – President Ilham Aliyev in his letter congratulated Tokayev on his victory, stating that the relations between both countries stem from the "common history, national-spiritual roots of our peoples" and expressed his hope to develop inter-state relations and strategic partnerships based on foundation and deepened cooperation in bilateral and multilateral order.
- Bahrain – Prince Salman bin Hamad bin Isa Al Khalifa congratulated Tokayev, where he wished him good health and happiness as well as further progress and prosperity on Kazakh people.
- Belarus – President Alexander Lukashenko sent a congratulatory letter to Tokayev upon his victory, expressing confidence in his political wisdom and rich life experience will contribute to the further development of Kazakhstan, growth of welfare in its citizens and the strengthening of a common Eurasian home.
- China – President Xi Jinping congratulated Tokayev's victory, assuring his readiness to open up the future for the stable and long-lasting development between two countries.
- Kyrgyzstan – President Sooronbay Jeenbekov during a phone call congratulated Tokayev. During the conversion, the two leaders reaffirmed their firm intention to further strengthen the relations between two nations, based on good neighborliness and friendship between the peoples.
- Qatar – Tamim bin Hamad Al Thani, Emir of Qatar, sent a congratulatory letter to Tokayev upon his victory.
- Russia – Russian ambassador to Kazakhstan Aleksey Borodavkin on the behalf of the President Vladimir Putin, congratulated Tokayev during the meeting, noting the huge voter turnout as a "convincing evidence" that Kazakhstanis chose Tokayev as president. From there, the issues of further deepening of allied relations and cooperation between the two countries within the framework of international organisations were discussed.
- Tajikistan – Tajik President Emomali Rahmon congratulated Tokayev on his victory in a phone call where both heads of state expressed confidence in further development of the partnership between two countries.
- Turkey – President Recep Tayyip Erdoğan sent a telegram to Tokayev, congratulating for his electoral win in which he described the results as an "important indicator of continuity and political stability in the country." Erdoğan in a letter also praised former president Nursultan Nazarbayev for reaching high level relations between two nations on basis of the merit in historic and ancient friendship.
- Turkmenistan – President Gurbanguly Berdimuhamedow phoned Tokayev, congratulating him on his victory, wishing good health, prosperity and great success at the highest state post. During the telephone conversation, the two sides discussed the priority areas of bilateral cooperation.
- Uzbekistan – Shavkat Mirziyoyev, the President of Uzbekistan, during a telephone conversion congratulated Tokayev. From there, both parties discussed the topic of bilateral cooperation between two countries.

==== Organisations ====
- European Union – European Council President Donald Tusk sent a congrats letter to Tokayev, saying that the European Union looks forward in deepening bilateral cooperation with Kazakhstan and wishing Tokayev success in his term in office.
