= Acting President of Kazakhstan =

Acting presidential post of Kazakhstan

Acting President of the Republic of Kazakhstan
- Қазақстан Республикасы Президентінің міндетін атқарушы (Kazakh); Исполняющий обязанности Президента Республики Казахстан (Russian)
- Presidential standard

- Flag of Kazakhstan
- Incumbent; Vacant since 12 June 2019
- Executive branch in Kazakh politics
- Status: Acting head of state Acting Head of government
- Member of: Government; Security Council
- Term length: Situational
- Constituting instrument: Constitution of Kazakhstan

The acting president of the Republic of Kazakhstan (Kazakh: Қазақстан Республикасы Президентінің міндетін атқарушы, romanized: Qazaqstan Respublikasy Prezidentınıñ mındetın atqaruşy; Russian: Исполняющий обязанности Президента Республики Казахстан) is a temporary post provided by the Constitution of Kazakhstan. This role is assumed by an individual who fulfills the duties of the president of Kazakhstan in cases of incapacity or vacancy. However, the acting president is more limited in power, as they cannot propose constitutional amendments.

== Constitutional provision ==
The Constitution of Kazakhstan explicitly outlines the provisions regarding the acting president, detailing the specific circumstances under which the acting president assumes the duties of the president in cases of incapacity or vacancy. This constitutional provision serves as the authoritative reference for the temporary role of the acting president in the Republic of Kazakhstan.

Article 48, Section III:

1. In case of early removal or impeachment of the President of the Republic of Kazakhstan, as well as in case of his or her death, the powers of the President of the Republic for the remaining term of office shall be transferred to the Chairman of the Senate of the Parliament; if the Chairman of the Senate is not able to assume the powers of the President, they shall be transferred to the Chairman of the Mäjilis of the Parliament; if the Chairman of the Mäjilis is not able to assume the powers of the President, they shall be transferred to the Prime Minister of the Republic. A person who has assumed the powers of the President of the Republic shall relinquish the powers of the Chairman of the Senate, the Chairman of the Mäjilis and the Prime Minister. In such a case, the vacant public offices shall be filled in the manner prescribed by the Constitution.
2. A person who has assumed the powers of the President of the Republic of Kazakhstan on the grounds and in the manner provided for in Paragraph 1 of this Article shall not have the right to introduce amendments and additions to the Constitution of the Republic of Kazakhstan.

== History ==
The office of the President of the Kazakh SSR was formally established in April 1990, setting aside for the order of succession precedent for fulfilling the president's vacant role. Initially, according to the Constitution of the Kazakh SSR, presidential powers would be transferred to the Vice President of Kazakhstan, or if unavailable, to the Chairman of the Supreme Soviet of the Kazakh SSR. With Kazakhstan's independence and the adoption of the 1993 Constitution, this precedent of largely remained intact, except for the requirement of holding snap presidential elections within two months, during which the incumbent head of state holds temporary presidential powers.

The 1995 Constitution of Kazakhstan was adopted, officially introducing the designated position of acting president and reshuffling the order of succession in cases where the president is unable to perform their duties as outlined in Constitutional Law No. 2733 "On the President," dated 26 December 1995. The Acting President's authority was limited, prohibiting actions such as dissolving the Parliament, terminating the powers of the Government, calling a republican referendum, or proposing constitutional changes.

On 6 May 1999, President Nursultan Nazarbayev signed a decree amending the Constitutional Law "On the President," which lifted several legal restrictions on the acting president, except for the prohibition against directly proposing constitutional changes.

The provision for an acting president was first invoked in March 2019, following Nazarbayev's resignation which saw Senate Chairman Kassym-Jomart Tokayev assuming the role of acting president for the first time in history. While the defunct constitutional provision once mandated snap presidential elections following the president's early resignation, Tokayev had the legal right to serve the remainder of Nazarbayev's term as acting president until 2020. Nevertheless, he chose to call for snap elections in June 2019 and participated as the frontrunner, adhering to the precedent. Subsequently, Tokayev was officially sworn in as the second president of Kazakhstan on 12 June 2019 after winning the snap vote that year.

== List ==
Nur Otan
Portrait	Name	Affiliation	Term of office		Qualifying office	Notes
	Kassym-Jomart Tokayev (born 1953)	Nur Otan	20 March 2019	12 June 2019	Chairman of the Senate	Became acting president when President Nazarbayev resigned. Was elected president in 2019.

== See also ==
- President of Kazakhstan
- List of leaders of Kazakhstan
- Order of succession
