= Amangeldi Taspihov =

Kazakh politician and businessman

Amangeldı Taspihov
- Амангелді Таспихов
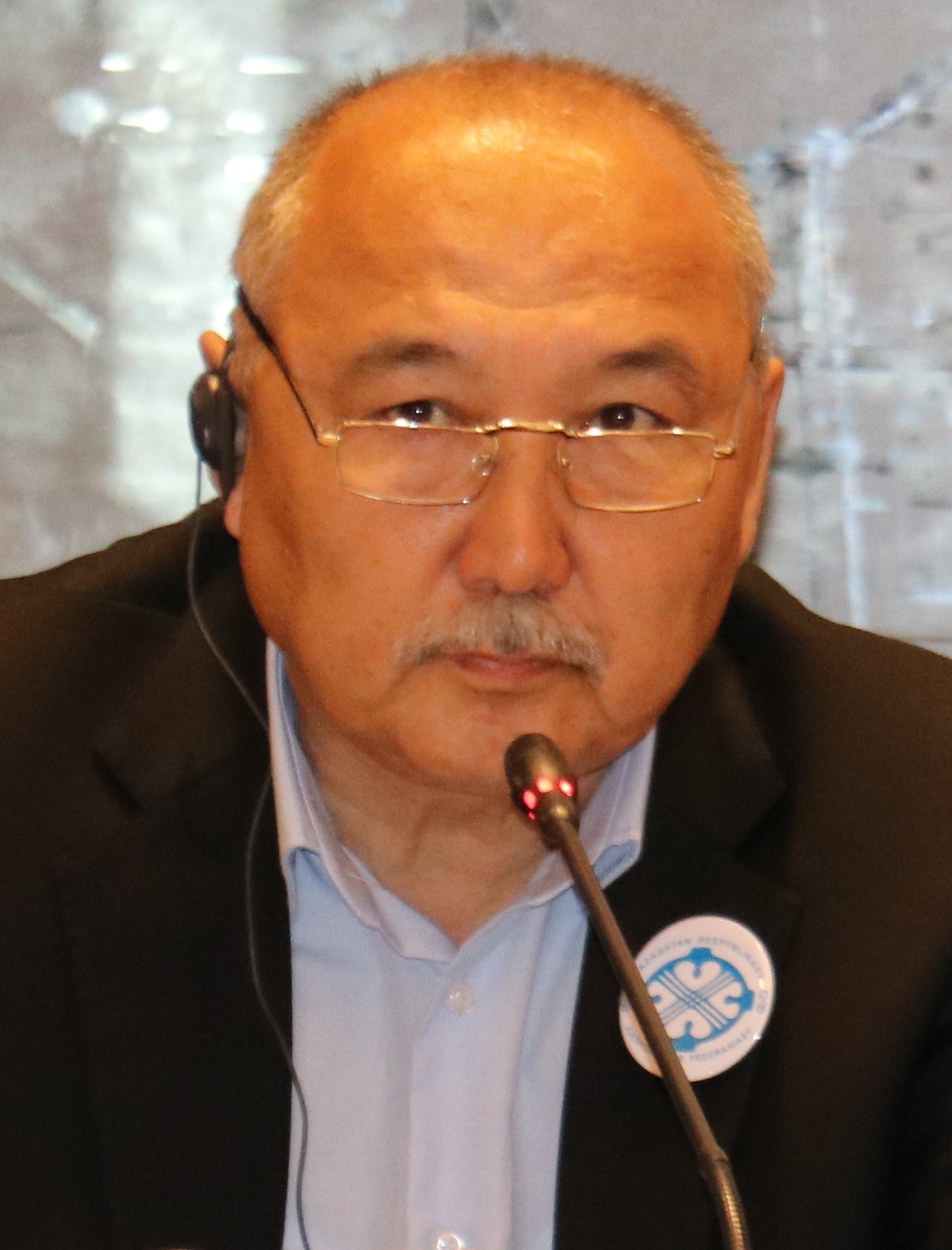
- Taspihov in 2019

Senator for West Kazakhstan Region
- In office 1998 – 20 September 2002 Serving with Engels Gabbasov, Rashit Ahmetov
- Preceded by: Viktor Baldin
- Succeeded by: Qabdygali Ahmetov

Member of the Mazhilis
- In office 2004 – 20 June 2007
- Constituency: 34th West Kazakhstan Region

Leader of Otan in the Mazhilis
- In office 3 November 2004 – 4 May 2005
- Leader: Nursultan Nazarbayev
- Preceded by: Qairolla Erejepov
- Succeeded by: Amzebek Jolshybekov

Personal details
- Born: 20 November 1959 (age 66) Qoşanköl, Kazakh SSR, Soviet Union
- Spouse: Elmira Taspihova
- Children: 3
- Education: Satbayev University

Amangeldı Satybaldyūly Taspihov (Kazakh: Амангелді Сатыбалдыұлы Таспихов; Kazakh pronunciation: [ɑmɑnɡʲeldɘ sɑtɯbɑɫdɯo̙ɫɯ taspɪχəf]; born 20 November 1959) is a Kazakh politician, businessman and the chairman of the Territorial Association of Federation of Trade Unions of Kazakhstan in West Kazakhstan Region. Taspihov served as a Senator from West Kazakhstan Region from 1998 to 2002, then as a member of the Mäjilis from 2004 to 2007. He was nominee for the Federation of Trade Unions of Kazakhstan (QRKF) in the 2019 Kazakh presidential election.

== Biography ==
=== Early life and education ===
Taspihov was born in the village of Qoşanköl in West Kazakhstan Region. In 1982, he graduated from the Satbayev University with a degree in mechanical engineering.

=== Career ===
After graduating, Taspihov became Process Engineer at the Almaty Heavy Machine Building Plant. From 1983 to 1987, he worked as assigner of the TNK Bureau, head of the section, head of the mechanical assembly shop, representative of the State Acceptance Authority of the Oral Valve Plant until he became the instructor of the City Committee of Communist Party of Kazakhstan in Oral.

In 1989, Taspihov became the president of Ayaz JSC. He served the post until he was elected as Senator from West Kazakhstan Region in 1998. From 2002 to 2003, Taspihov was the chairman of the Committee for Standardization, Metrology and Certification of the Ministry of Industry and Trade of the Republic of Kazakhstan. In 2004 general elections, he was elected as member of the Mazhilis from the 34th Constituency of the West Kazakhstan Region. From there, Taspihov served as member of Committee on Economic Reform and Regional Development until the Parliament was dismissed on 20 June 2007.

In November 2007, Taspihov became the deputy chairman of the board of the Joint Stock Company National Company Social and Entrepreneurial Corporation Batys until he was appointed as äkim of the Zhelayevsky District of the Oral. In June 2010, Taspihov became the chairman of the Industry Committee of the Ministry of Industry and New Technologies. From 2017 to 2019, he was the chairman of the board of directors of Jaiyqteploenergo JSC.

=== 2019 presidential campaign ===
On 24 April 2019, Taspihov was nominated by the Federation of Trade Unions of Kazakhstan (QRKF) to be the candidate for snap presidential election. On 4 May 2019, he was registered by the Central Election Commission.

In his campaign, Taspihov advocated for safe working conditions, ensuring labor rights of workers, decent wages, and the regulation of labor migration. In the election results, Taspihov won 1.98% of the vote and took 5th place in the race.

=== Post-election ===
After the election, Taspihov returned to his business life. He is currently serving as the director of the Production Branch of KazTransGazAimak JSC, Ural Oil and Gas LLP since 2011 and is the chairman of the Territorial Association of Federation of Trade Unions of Kazakhstan in West Kazakhstan Region since 2019.
