= Dania Espaeva =

Kazakh politician (born 1961)

MP Dania Espaeva
- Дания Еспаева
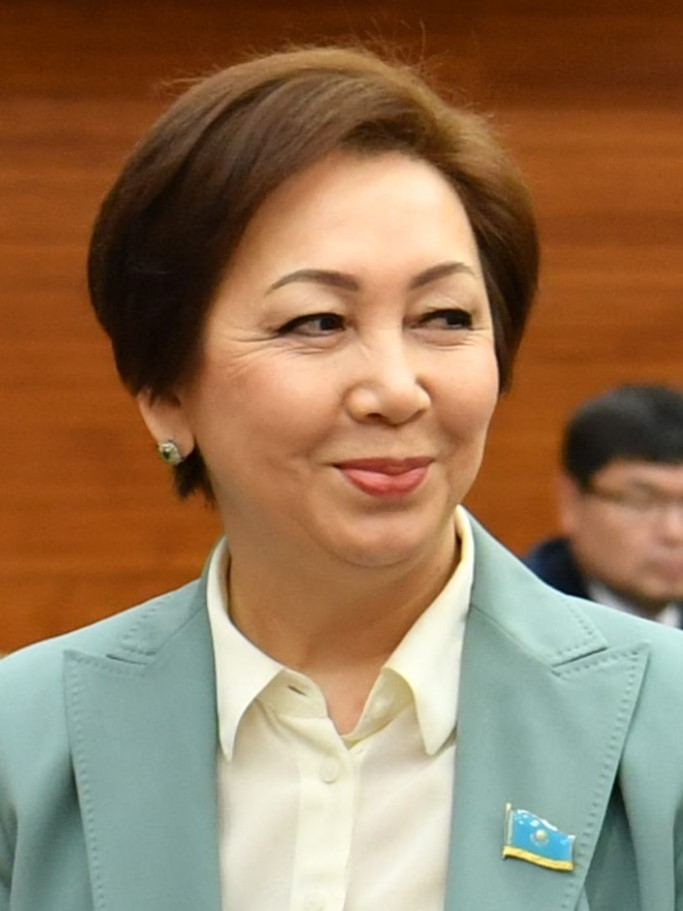
- Espaeva in 2023

Deputy Chairwoman of the Kurultai
- Incumbent
- Assumed office 28 August 2026 Serving with Nurlan Beknazarov; Dinara Zakieva
- Chairman: Aibek Dädebai
- Preceded by: Office established

Member of the Kurultai
- Incumbent
- Assumed office 27 August 2026
- Preceded by: Office established

Deputy Chairwoman of the Mäjilis
- In office 19 March 2023 – 1 July 2026 Serving with Albert Rau
- Chairman: Erlan Qoşanov
- Preceded by: Balaim Kesebaeva; Pavel Kazantsev
- Succeeded by: Office abolished

Member of the Mäjilis
- In office 20 March 2016 – 1 July 2026
- President: Nursultan Nazarbayev; Kassym-Jomart Tokayev

Chair of Aq Jol
- Incumbent
- Assumed office 13 June 2026
- Preceded by: Azat Peruaşev

Personal details
- Born: 5 March 1961 (age 65) Zhaisan, Kazakh SSR, Soviet Union
- Party: Aq Jol
- Children: 2
- Education: Almaty Accounting and Credit College; Kazakh State Academy of Management

Dania Mädiqyzy Espaeva (Kazakh: Дания Мәдиқызы Еспаева, IPA: [dænʲɪˈja mæˌdəjqəˈzə jɪsˈpa(j)ɪvə]; born 5 March 1961) is a Kazakh politician who has served as Deputy Chairwoman of the Kurultai and member of the Kurultai from the Aq Jol party list since August 2026. Leader of the party since June 2026, she was Aq Jol's presidential candidate in the 2019 election.

Before, Espaeva was in the Mäjilis as a member of Aq Jol from 2016 to 2026.

== Early life and education ==
Dania Espaeva was born in Zhaisan, Kazakh SSR, Soviet Union, on 5 March 1961. She graduated from the Alma-Ata Accounting and Credit College in 1982, and the Kazakh State Academy of Management in 1993.

== Career ==
In the State Bank of the USSR Espaeva worked as an economist in Aktobe from 1982 to 1991. She was a senior specialist at TuranBank in Aktobe in 1991. She was a chief specialist for AlemBank Kazakhstan in Aktobe from 1995 to 1997. She was the deputy head of the lending department of BankTuranAlem in Aktobe in 1997, acting head from 1997 to 1998, deputy director from 1998 to 2005, and director from 2005 to 2016. At Kazkommertsbank she was director of the branch in Aktobe from 2014 to 2016.

In the 2016 election she won a seat in the Mäjilis as a member of Aq Jol's electoral list. During her tenure in the Mäjilis she served on the Finance and Budget committee. She was the deputy chair of the Mäjilis.

Espaeva was a candidate in the 2019 presidential election, the first woman to seek the presidency. She won Aq Jol's nomination with 49.5% of the 190 votes in a secret ballot. She did not participate in a presidential debate on 29 May, but was represented by Aq Jol chair Azat Peruaşev. She lost the election to Kassym-Jomart Tokayev.

On 13 June 2026, ahead of the 2026 Kazakh legislative election, Peruaşev stepped down and Espaeva was elected Chair of the party. After the campaign, the Aq Jol party was assigned 6 seats, and Espaeva was among those present on the party list.

During the 1st Kurultai's first session on 28 August 2026, Espaeva was elected Deputy Chairwoman of the Kurultai.

== Personal life ==
The Order of Kurmet was given to Espaeva in 2011, and the Order of Parasat was given to her in 2020. She is the mother of two children.

== Political positions ==
During Espaeva's presidential campaign she proposed lowering loan rates by the National Bank of Kazakhstan, stopping currency devaluations, reduce the value-added tax or replace it with a sales tax.

== Works cited ==
=== News ===
- "Утвержден новый состав мажилиса парламента Казахстана". Nur. 24 March 2016. Archived from the original on 12 April 2016.
- "Shoo-In Toqaev Skips Kazakh Presidential Campaign Debate". Radio Free Europe/Radio Liberty. 29 May 2019. Archived from the original on 28 June 2025.
- Zhussupova, Dilshat (27 May 2019). "Kazakhstan's first female presidential candidate sees mass entrepreneurship as vehicle to improve lives". Astana Times. Archived from the original on 28 June 2025.
- Higgins, Andrew (10 June 2019). "Kazakhstan Gets New Leader, but Old System's Grip on Power Remains". The New York Times. Archived from the original on 28 June 2025.

=== Web ===
- "ЕСПАЕВА Дания Мәдиқызы". Mäjilis. Archived from the original on 28 June 2025.
- "Өмірбаяны". Parliament of Kazakhstan. Archived from the original on 28 June 2025.
