= Jambyl Ahmetbekov =

Kazakh politician

MP Jambyl Ahmetbekov
- Жамбыл Ахметбеков
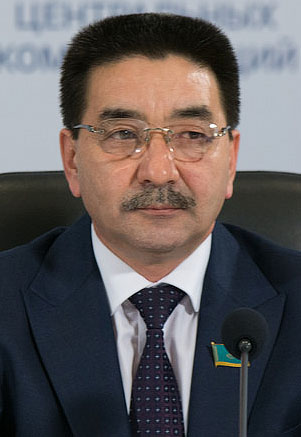
- Ahmetbekov in 2017

Member of the Mazhilis
- In office 20 January 2012 – 19 January 2023

Secretary of the People's Party
- In office 1 March 2007 – 24 January 2023

Personal details
- Born: 11 February 1961 (age 65) Janteke, Kazakh SSR, Soviet Union
- Party: People's Party (2005–2023)
- Occupation: Politician

Jambyl Aujanūly Ahmetbekov (Note: Often transliterated as Zhambyl Auzhanovich Akhmetbekov through a Russified Romanization of Жамбыл Аужанович Ахметбеков.) (Kazakh: Жамбыл Аужанұлы Ахметбеков, Kazakh pronunciation: [ʐɑmbɯɫ ɑwʐɑno̙ɫɯ ɑχmjetbʲekəf]; born 11 February 1961) is a Kazakh politician, from 2007 to 2023 he was the Secretary of Central Committee of the People's Party of Kazakhstan, and from 2012 to 2023 a member of the Mazhilis. He was a nominee for the Communist People's Party of Kazakhstan (QKHP) in the 2011 and 2019 Kazakh presidential election.

== Early life and career ==
Ahmetbekov was born in Shanteke, Tselinograd Oblast, Kazakh SSR. In 1978, he graduated from Kuybyshev High School. From 1978 to 1983, Ahmetbekov studied at the Faculty of Agricultural Mechanization of the Tselinograd Agricultural Institute. During his time, Ahmetbekov played guitar and sports.

From September 1983, he worked as a mechanic at the Kurgaldzhinsky state farm, and already in November of that year, Ahmetbekov was elected to be the secretary of the Komsomol committee of a state farm. From 1987 to 1990, Ahmetbekov worked as an instructor in the ideological department of the Kurgaldzhinsky District Committee of the Communist Party of the Kazakh SSR. In 1988, he was awarded the medal of the Komsomol Central Committee. From April 1990 to April 1992, he worked in an elected position as the First Secretary of the Kurgaldzhin District Committee of the Lenin Communist Youth Union of Kazakhstan and was a member of the bureau of the Kurgaldzhin district committee of the Communist Party of the Kazakh SSR.

In 1994, Ahmetbekov graduated from KIMEP University, during that time, he was the head of the Culture Department of the Tengiz District Administration of the Karaganda Region.

From 1998 to 2001, Ahmetbekov worked as a platoon commander, then deputy director for military-physical training of the Sunkar Akmola Regional military-technical lyceum, then as a methodologist of the District Department of Education for Primary Military Training and Sports.

In September 2005, Ahmetbekov joined the Communist People's Party of Kazakhstan (QKHP). He became the party's secretary In March 2007.

== Political career ==
=== 2011 presidential campaign ===
At the 5th QKHP Extraordinary Congress held on 14 February 2011, he was announced as the party's nominee for the 2011 presidential election. Ahmetbekov was one of the last candidates to collect enough signatures to be registered by the Central Election Commission. He expressed confidence of securing victory in the race by knowing the "aspirations of the people" better than others and would actively use social media to promote his ideas and gain support as well. Ahmetbekov's platforms consisted of improving wages for workers, free education and healthcare for poorer people, improving tax system, and expanding assistance to food, clothing, footwear and household item producers. He also called for a multi-party system in the country.

Ahmetbekov won 1.36% of the vote and took 3rd place in the race behind Gani Qasymov. Despite not winning the election, Ahmetbekov stated that it opened a "direct path" for the party in the upcoming parliamentary elections.

=== 2019 presidential campaign ===
On 26 April 2019, Ahmetbekov was nominated by the QKHP at the party's 14th Extraordinary Congress as candidate for the 2019 Kazakh presidential election. One of his main campaign platforms was to fight poverty. Ahmetbekov expressed his support for economic integration with neighboring countries with the framework of the Eurasian Economic Union and promised to adhere all programs "aimed at developing the country" such as Nurly Zhol and Belt and Road Initiative saying that these are "not political, but economic programs."

During a televised debate between the candidates, he called for the increase of production for domestic goods and the support for the demand. Ahmetbekov also noted that anyone stealing must be brought to justice which he accused of "fugitive oligarchs" and its "henchmen" of doing it.

In an interview to Vlast.kz, Ahmetbekov proposed for Kazakhstan to have its own Facebook to prevent outside world influence from "fugitive oligarchs", in which he referred to exiled Kazakh banker Mukhtar Ablyazov, whom he blamed for "processing" people's brains.

In an election results, he won 1.62% of the vote and earned sixth place in the race. Ahmetbekov congratulated President-elect Kassym-Jomart Tokayev for his win, responding to his loss that "an optimistic attitude will always lead the party in order to continue its work."

=== Member of the Mazhilis (2012–2023) ===
In the 2012 Kazakh legislative election, Ahmetbekov was the first on the QKHP party list in the race. He was elected as a member of the Mazhilis along with other six party members that won seats. He ran for reelection again in 2016 where he won another term.

In May 2016, Ahmetbekov proposed a ban on social marketing, calling it a pyramid scheme which was outlawed in Kazakhstan in 2014.

In 2019, he criticized the Hong Kong Human Rights and Democracy Act that was signed by U.S. President Donald Trump, claiming it is interference in China's internal affairs in which he called it a violation of an international law.
