= Toleutai Raqymbekov =

Kazakh politician

- Төлеутай Рақымбеков
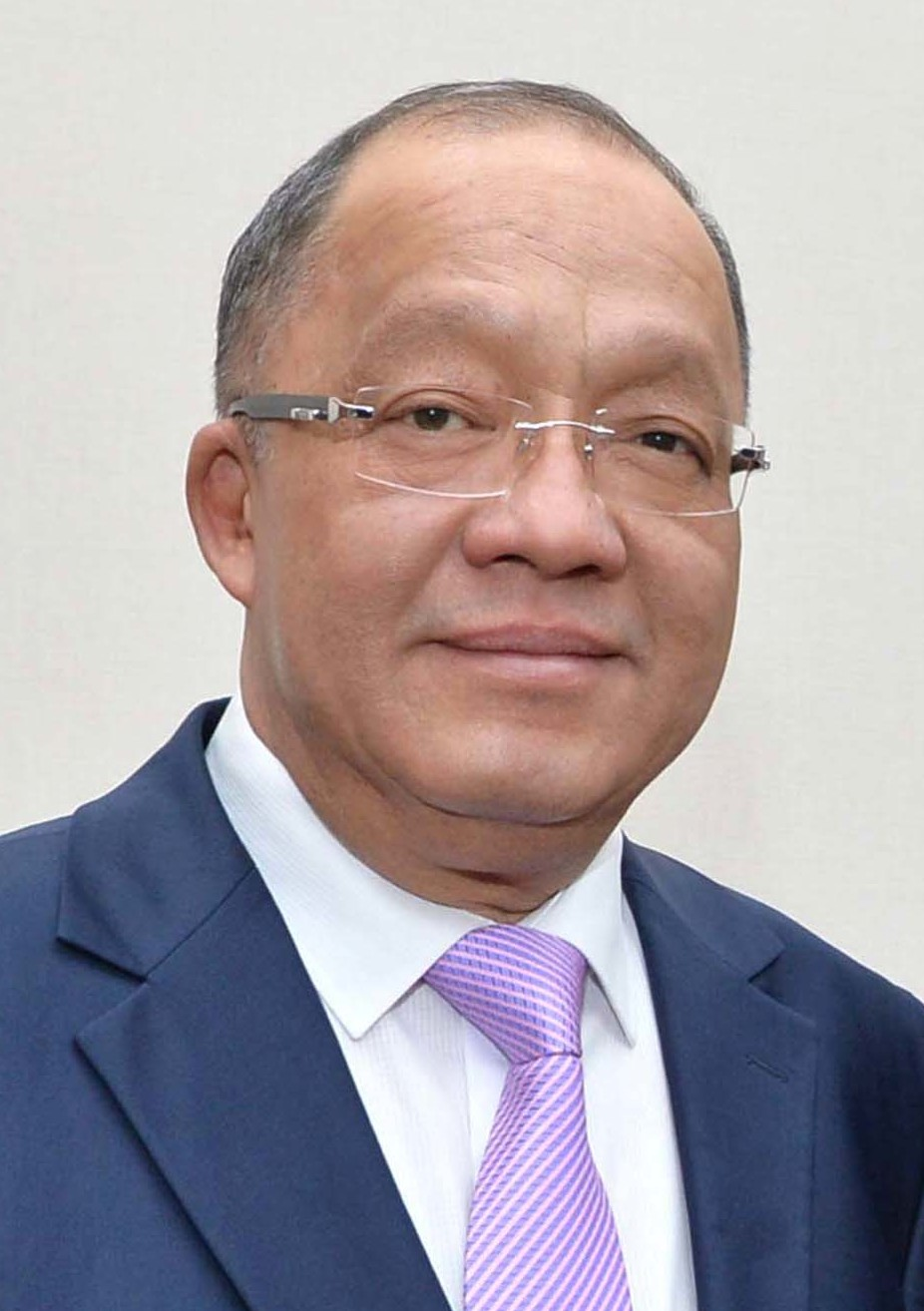
- Raqymbekov in 2020
- Born: 19 July 1964 (age 62); Atasu, Kazakh SSR, Soviet Union
- Education: Kazakh National Agrarian University; Karagandy State University; L.N. Gumilyov Eurasian National University
- Political party: Auyl
- Spouse: Saltanat Raqymbekova
- Children: 2

Toleutai Sataiuly Raqymbekov (Kazakh: Төлеутай Сатайұлы Рақымбеков, Töleutai Sataiūly Raqymbekov, [tœlʲewtɑj sɑtɑjo̙ɫɯ ɾaqɯmbʲekəf]; born 19 July 1964) is a Kazakh politician who's the Chairman of National Agrarian Research and Education Center. He served as a Vice Minister of Agriculture in 2017 and was presidential nominee for the Auyl People's Democratic Patriotic Party in the 2019 Kazakh presidential election.

== Biography ==
=== Early life and education ===
Raqymbekov was born in 1964 in the village of Atasu in Karaganda Region. In 1986, he graduated from the Kazakh National Agrarian University with a degree in mechanical engineering then in 2001 from the Karagandy State University with a degree in law. In 2014, he earned his masters in construction from the L.N. Gumilyov Eurasian National University.

=== Career ===
After graduating from the Kazakh National Agrarian University, Raqymbekov was a junior researcher, postgraduate student there until 1987. From that same year, he worked as an engineer, foreman, senior foreman, senior process engineer of the Selkhoztekhnika Zhanaarka Regional Office. From 1989 to 1992, he was a post-graduate student of the All-Russian Research Institute of Electrification of Agriculture.

From 1992, Raqymbekov was the Director of Zhazira MChP and Dana MChP, President of the JSC DanaBusiness Center for Small Business, General Director of LLP Jezkazgan Regional Center for Small and Medium Business until he was appointed as a deputy äkim of the city of Satbayev. From 2001, Raqymbekov worked as an Associate Professor of the Jezkazgan State University and from 2002, he was the Head of Department, Director of the Department of Analysis and State Regulation of the Development of the Agro-Industrial Complex and Rural Areas, Director of the Department of Agricultural Processing products, Customs and Tariff policy and the WTO, Director of the Department for Regulation of Agricultural Markets of the Ministry of Agriculture. In 2006, Raqymbekov became the Director of the Department of Transport Policy and International Cooperation of the Ministry of Transport and Communications. From July 2007 to January 2009, he was the President of KazAgroInnovation JSC.

In March 2009, Raqymbekov was appointed an advisor to the Deputy Prime Minister of Kazakhstan and worked until he became the Chairman of the Board of JSC Kazakhstan Center for Modernization and Development of Housing and Communal Services in November 2009. In December 2009, he was appointed as a deputy äkim of Karaganda Region where he served the post until 2011. In July 2013, Raqymbekov became the Chairman of the Board of the Association of Legal Entities National Chamber of Housing and Public Utilities and Construction of the Republic of Kazakhstan and from 11 March 2016, he was the Director of the Atameken Center for Agricultural Competence of the National Chamber of Entrepreneurs of the Republic of Kazakhstan.

On 5 April 2017, Raqymbekov was appointed as Vice Minister of Agriculture. He served the post until being dismissed on 25 July 2017. From September 2017, Raqymbekov was the Professor of the Department Finance of the Saken Seifullin Kazakh Agrotechnical University until becoming the Chairman of the Board of National Agrarian Scientific and Educational Center on 15 April 2019.

=== 2019 presidential campaign ===
Following the announcement of a snap presidential election in Kazakhstan, Raqymbekov was nominated as candidate by the Auyl People's Democratic Patriotic Party on 25 April 2019. He became registered candidate on 6 May 2019.

Raqymbekov campaigned mainly for development of agriculture which in his opinion would happen only when farmers and scientists actively use innovative technologies and empathized the need for Kazakhstan to become an agricultural state and be one of the world market's leader in ecologically clean products. He also ran in the issues of preserving spiritual and national values, improving education, health care and in social development. Following the election which was held on 9 June 2019, Raqymbekov won 3.04% of the vote, earning 4th place in race.

=== Post-election career ===
On 17 July 2019, Raqymbekov was appointed as member of the National Council of Public Trust under the President of Kazakhstan. Since 4 February 2020, he's a member of the Center for Analysis of Monitoring of Socio-Economic Reforms under the President.
