= Uly Dala Qyrandary =

Uly Dala Qyrandary Ұлы дала қырандары
- Chairman: Sadybek Tügel
- Founded: 12 October 2011; 14 years ago
- Ideology: Kazakh nationalism
- Colours: Magenta Yellow

Ūly Dala Qyrandary (Kazakh: Ұлы дала қырандары, lit. 'Eagles of the Great Steppe') is a Kazakh political organisation that was founded on 12 October 2011. The organization is engaged in the development of cultural and national values in the country. It is led by Kazakh writer and politician Sadybek Tügel who was the candidate for the movement in the 2019 Kazakh presidential election. Tugel won 0.92% of the vote and took last place in the race.
