= Ult Tagdyry =

Kazakhstan nationalist public association

"Ult Tagdyry" Joint National-Patriotic Movement
- «Ұлт тағдыры» бірлескен ұлттық-патриоттық қозғалысы
- Formation: July 27, 2005; 21 years ago
- Type: Public association
- Headquarters: Almaty
- Region served: Kazakhstan
- Chairman: Dos Koshim

Ult Tagdyry (Kazakh: Ұлт тағдыры, romanized: Ūlt tağdyry, lit. 'Fate of the Nation'), officially the "Ult Tagdyry" Joint National-Patriotic Movement (Kazakh: «Ұлт тағдыры» бірлескен ұлттық-патриоттық қозғалысы, romanized: «Ūlt tağdyry» bırlesken ūlttyq-patriottyq qozğalysy; Russian: Объединенное национально-патриотическое движение «Ұлт тағдыры») is a Kazakh nationalist public association that was formed in 2005. The movement advocates for civil rights, language preservation, rural protection, and legal reforms.

In the 2019 presidential election, Ult Tagdyry nominated opposition candidate Amirjan Qosanov, who won approximately 16% of the vote.

== History ==
On 27 July 2005, a group of political activists, including Dos Koshim and Hasen Qojahmetov, announced the creation of a national political movement in Kazakhstan called Ult Tagdyry ("Fate of the Nation") at a press conference in Almaty. The launch coincided with the 100th anniversary of the 1905 Karkaraly petition, which called for civil liberties, equality, and the protection of the Kazakh language and culture. The organizers declared they would continue their work even without official registration as public association and emphasized the need to address persistent national issues such as language decline, rural stagnation, land sales, and state control over religion. While some observers linked the rise of such movements ahead of the 2005 Kazakh presidential election, the founders of Ult Tagdyry described it as a broad, nonpartisan initiative with support from across the political spectrum.

In 2010, the group criticized the proposed referendum to extend Nazarbayev's term until 2020.

In April 2019, Ult Tagdyry took part in the presidential election by nominating Amirjan Qosanov as the opposition candidate. According to Dos Koshim, stated that while Qosanov was not a member of the organization, his views on democracy, national identity, and the need for systemic change aligned with those of the Ult Tagdyry movement's representatives. Qosanov received approximately 16% of the vote in the first round, the highest share ever achieved by a non-incumbent candidate in Kazakhstan’s presidential election history. In response, Koshim blamed the opposition for attacking Qosanov instead of addressing systemic issues and criticizing President Kassym-Jomart Tokayev, claiming that electoral fraud prevented his victory and undermined the movement's call for change.

During the 2023 interview, Koshim clarified that he does not consider Ult Tagdyry as his personal party, stating that the leadership of the organization should be rooted in those who fought for Kazakh independence or participated in key historical movements, like the Azat Civil Movement of Kazakhstan or Jeltoqsan.

== Election results ==
Election year	Candidate	First round			Second round			Result
Election year	Candidate	Votes	%	Rank	Votes	%	Rank	Result
2019	Amirjan Qosanov	1,495,401	16.23%	2nd	—N/a			Lost ✗
