= Amirjan Qosanov =

Kazakh politician

- Әміржан Қосанов
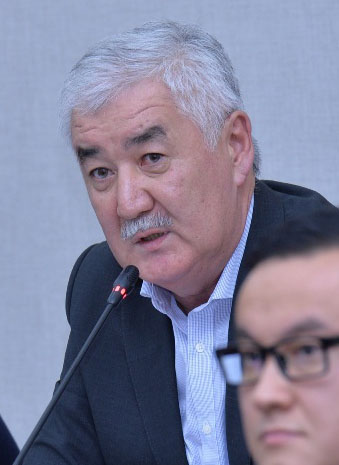
- Qosanov in 2019

Personal details
- Born: 13 May 1964 (age 62) Sapaq, Kazakh SSR, Soviet Union
- Party: Independent (1991–1998, 2013–present)
- Other political affiliations: Communist Party (1984–1991); Republican People's Party (1998–2001); United Democratic Party (2001–2005); EQU (2005–2006); JUSDP (2006–2013); Ult Tagdyry (2019)
- Occupation: Politician, journalist

Ämırjan Sağidrahmanūly Qosanov (Note: Often transliterated as Amirzhan Sagidrakhmanovich Kossanov through a Russified Romanization of Амиржан Сагидрахманович Косанов.) (Kazakh: Әміржан Сағидрахманұлы Қосанов, Kazakh pronunciation: [æmɘɾʒɑn sɑʁɪdɾɑχmɑno̙ɫɯ qɔsɑnəf]; born 13 May 1964) is a Kazakh politician, journalist, political activist. He was a main challenger to Kassym-Jomart Tokayev in the 2019 Kazakh presidential election.

== Early life, career ==
Amirjan Qosanov was born to a Muslim Kazakh family on 13 May 1964 in the settlement of Sapaq in the Aral District of the Kyzylorda Region. He is the son of Sagid-Rahman Qosanov.

From 1981, he worked as a mechanic in the Novokazalinsk station. From 1983 to 1985, Qosanov served in the Soviet Army. In 1984 he joined the Communist Party of Kazakhstan and was in it until its self-dissolution in 1991.

After graduating from the Faculty of Journalism of the Kazakh State University in 1989. Qosanov worked as a correspondent of the Party Life Department of the Republican Newspaper Socialist Kazakhstan and in 1990, at a Komsomol job by being the First Secretary of the Frunze District Committee, then as a Head of the Policy Department of the Central Committee.

After the collapse of the Soviet Union, Qosanov worked in the State Committee on Youth Affairs where he held the position as the Head of the Press and Mass Information Department, Deputy Chairman of the Committee (1993), Deputy Minister of Youth, Tourism and Sport of Kazakhstan (1994) and was a member of the Commission under President Nursultan Nazarbayev which worked on issuing pardons.

From 14 October 1994 to October 1997, he served as a press secretary under the former, now-exiled Prime Minister Akezhan Kazhegeldin while still holding the position as the Head of the Press and Mass Information.

== Political career ==
In 1998, Qosanov worked as a press secretary of the Union of Industrialists and Entrepreneurs of Kazakhstan and served as a co-founder and the president of the Center for Social-Economic and Social-Political Initiatives. That same year, he was elected as a deputy chairman of the Republican People’s Party (QRHP). From 2000, Qosanov was a chairman of the party's executive committee, as well as the co-chairman of the Forum of Democratic Forces of Kazakhstan.

He participated in the unification of opposition forces in the framework for the For a Just Kazakhstan alliance. In 2006, Qosanov became the First Deputy Chairman of the Nationwide Social Democratic Party.

On 24 October 2009, Qosanov was elected to the post of General Secretary of the Azat Party after it became united with the Nationwide Social Democratic Party, which became illegal after the Ministry of Justice of Kazakhstan for several years refused to register the union of both parties. On 20 March 2013, the 10th Party Congress, to which Qosanov wasn't allowed to attend, ended up being expelled from the post of Secretary General. After that, the Azat party became divided again with Qosanov leaving it to form his own faction.

=== Imprisonment ===
In March 2006, Qosanov was sentenced 15 days to jail for organizing an unauthorized rally in support of politically repressed victims by the Almaty Inter-District Court.

In February and March 2012, he served two 15-day jail terms for organizing a rally in support of the victims of the Zhanaozen massacre. During Qozanov's second jail term, he went on a hunger strike. Various provocations and acts of intimidation were repeatedly organized towards him. Qosanov's apartment doors were concreted, and he received a wreath, as well as a payment for his funeral.

=== 2019 presidential campaign ===
Following the resignation of long-time President Nursultan Nazarbayev, many talks arose of a possible snap presidential election being held. On 9 April 2019, Qosanov expressed interest in running for the election, believing that the race would possibly be fair under the new country's leadership. That same day, President Kassym-Jomart Tokayev announced that a snap election would be held on 9 June. On 26 April, Qosanov announced his candidacy for president for the Ult Tagdyry in which he was unanimously nominated by its delegates. He became a registered candidate on 6 May.

Qosanov ran on a platform in fighting against corruption, reducing the powers of a president, allowing direct elections of akims, making Kazakh economy less dependent on raw resources, and prohibiting the construction of nuclear power plants. During his campaign, Qosanov was accused by several opposition groups such as the leader of Democratic Choice of Kazakhstan, Mukhtar Ablyazov, for being co-opted by the government due to history of Kazakhstan's unfair elections and treatment towards political activists. Qosanov himself stated that he already doubted that the elections would be fair and that if any violations were reported, he would condemn the results. At the 2019 Kazakh presidential election, which took place on 9 June, he won 16.02% of the vote, making it a best performance by a candidate towards an incumbent president since Zharmakhan Tuyakbay in 2005. On the night of 10 June, Qosanov conceded the race and congratulated Tokayev for his win to which he received criticism for basing it on the exit polls before final results were announced and for refusing to condemn the election despite his promise after many cases of fraud were reported. Qosanov stated that the difference between the exit polls and the final results were usually similar in the elections. He emphasized that he's obliged not abandon his policy statements and principles and will promise to advocate for democratic values and for a dialogue between society and the authorities.
