= Federation of Trade Unions of Kazakhstan =

Kazakh national trade union federation

FTUK/FPRK
- Federation of Trade Unions of the Republic of Kazakhstan
- Headquarters: Astana, Kazakhstan
- Location: Kazakhstan
- Members: 1.5 million
- Key people: Baqytjan Abdiraiym, chairman
- Affiliations: GCTU
- Website: www.fprk.kz

The Federation of Trade Unions of Kazakhstan (FTUK) is a national trade union center in Kazakhstan. It has a membership of 1.5 million, and is the successor organization to the official trade unions of the communist era.

FTUK is affiliated with the General Confederation of Trade Unions.
