= Sadibek Tügel =

Kazakh writer and publicist (born 1955)

- Сәдібек Түгел
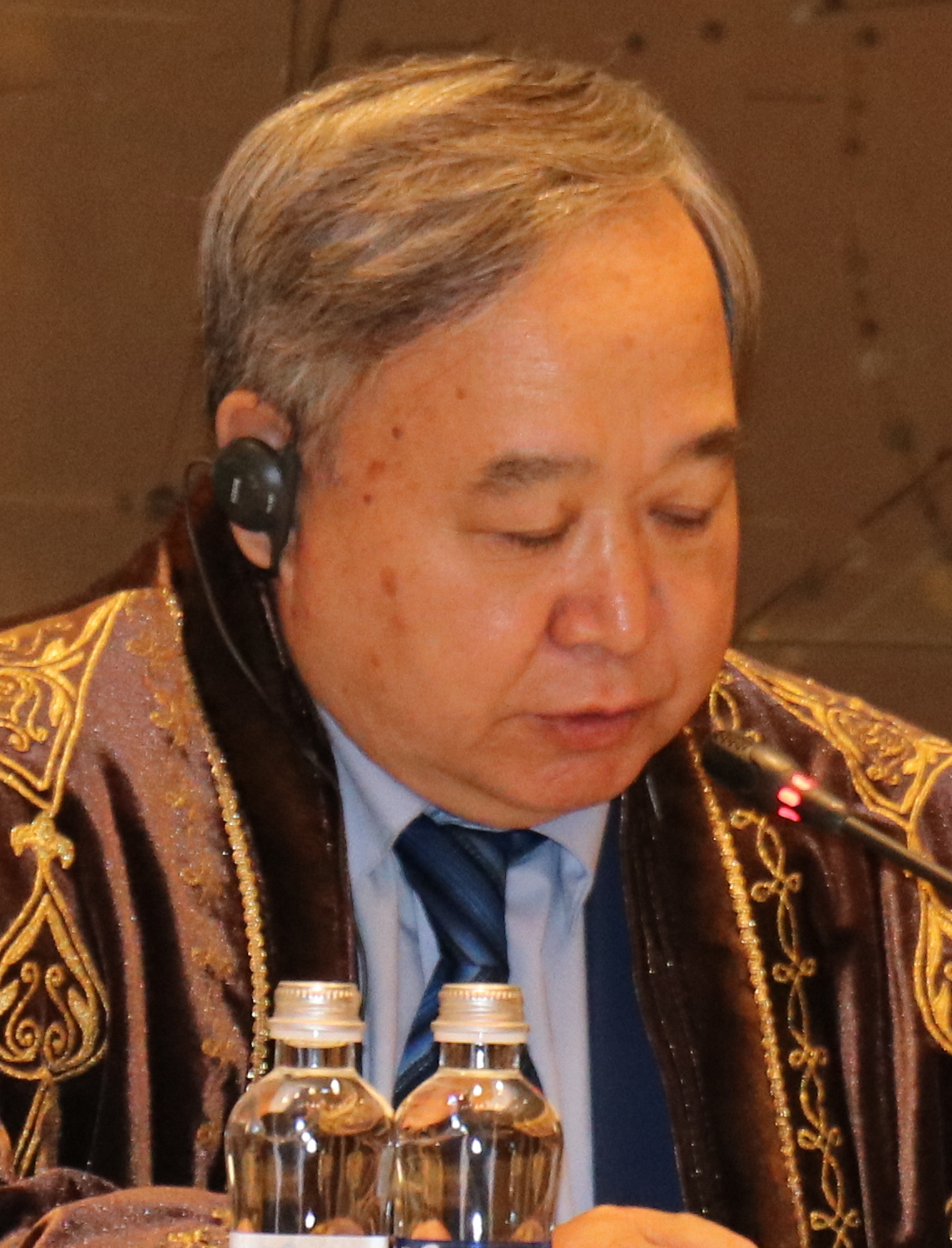
- Tügel in 2019
- Born: 23 February 1955 (age 71); Amangeldi, Kazakh SSR, Soviet Union
- Education: Al-Farabi Kazakh National University; Almaty Higher Party School
- Occupations: Writer, publicist
- Children: Aidyn, Aigerim

Sädibek Tügel (Kazakh: Сәдібек Түгел, Sädıbek Tügel; born 23 February 1955) is a Kazakh writer and publicist, who's a member of the Writers' Union of Kazakhstan. He was a candidate for the Uly Dala Qyrandary movement in the 2019 Kazakh presidential election.

== Early life and education ==
Tügel was born in the village of Amangeldi in the East Kazakhstan Region. In May 1973 he was drafted into the Soviet Armed Forces where he served in East Germany. In 1982 he graduated from the correspondence faculty of journalism of the Al-Farabi Kazakh National University. From 1988 to 1990 he studied full-time at the Almaty Higher Party School, where he received a degree in political science and sociology.

== Career ==
Tügel began his career as a mechanic at the Alma-Ata cotton-spinning factory. He worked as a translator-correspondent of the Ulanskiy district newspaper Rastsvet - Orken, an instructor of the Organizational Department of the executive committee of the District Council of People's deputies, the First Secretary of the Ulanskiy District Committee of the Komsomol of Kazakhstan, then as the head of the Organizational Department of the Ulanskiy District Committee of the Communist Party of Kazakhstan.

From 2002 to 2004 Tügel worked as the head of the International Press Center of Astana, then the general director of the information agency “Astana Dauysy”. In 2004 he became the head of the Senate Department of the Parliament. Tügel has also been engaged in creative and social activities, including serving as the vice president of the Federation of National Equestrian Sports since January 2006. He has served as a chairman of the political organization Uly Dala Qyrandary since 12 October 2011.

=== 2019 presidential campaign ===
On 22 April 2019 Tügel announced his bid for presidency for the Uly Dala Qyrandary, making him one of the first candidates to do so. He was registered on 3 May 2019 by the Central Election Commission after gathering more than 122,000 signatures.

Tügel campaigned on issues including the preservation of the Kazakh language and protection of women's and children's rights, as well as preserving and popularizing traditional Kazakh values. He advocated for free education as well as protection for those affected by environmental disasters. He also proposed introducing the death penalty for pedophiles and corrupt officials, as well as a ban on the lease and sale of Kazakh lands to foreigners. On 3 June 2019, Tügel proposed introducing a ban preventing Kazakh women from marrying foreigners. He called international marriages "a moral crime" and recommended to solve the issue by changing the "Law on Marriage". Tügel won only 0.92% of the vote, earning a last place in the race.
