= Kazakhstan's 20th electoral district =

Single-mandate territorial constituency in Kazakhstan

Electoral district No. 20
- Kazakh: №20 сайлау округі Russian: Избирательный округ №20
- Single-mandate constituency for the Mäjilis
- Region: Almaty Region (2004–2007); Kostanay Region (2022–present)
- Population: 831,835 (2023)
- Electorate: 554,655 (2023)
- Major settlements: Kostanay (seat), Arkalyk, Lisakovsk, Rudny and Jitiqara

Current constituency
- Created: 2004; 2022 (re-established)
- Seats: 1
- Party: Amanat
- Deputy: Erkin Äbil
- Elected: 2023

The Electoral district No. 20 (Kazakh: №20 сайлау округі, romanized: №20 sailau okrugı; Russian: Избирательный округ №20) is a single-mandate territorial constituency in Kazakhstan, represented in the lower chamber Mäjilis of the Parliament. It covers the entirety of Kostanay Region, including all its regional districts, with its seat being centered in Kostanay.

The constituency was originally formed for the 2004 legislative election and existed until being abolished in 2007. However, it was reestablished in 2022 and is currently represented by deputy Erkin Äbil (Amanat) since March 2023.

== Geography ==
The Electoral District No. 20 is situated in the territory of Kostanay Region, and its administrative center, Kostanay, serves as the seat of the constituency. The electoral district shares borders with No. 10 (Aktobe Region) to the southeast, No. 28 (Ulytau Region) to the south, No. 19 (Karaganda Region) and No. 9 to the southeast, No. 28 (Ulytau Region) to the west, No. 16 (Jambyl Region) to the southwest, No. 12 (Almaty Region) and No. 17 (Jetisu Region) to the southeast, and No. 24 (Akmola Region) to the north.

== History ==
The Electoral District No. 20 was formed for the 2004 legislative election as a result of redistribution originally within the boundaries of Almaty Region, and Oralbek Jaqianov served as deputy from the constituency. From there, the electoral district continued to exist until its dissolution following the 2007 amendment, which led to the abolition of all constituencies as part of the transition from a mixed-member majoritarian representation to a fully party-list proportional representation system. The change affected the composition of all seats in the lower chamber Mäjilis of the Kazakh Parliament beginning with the 2007 legislative election.

On 24 December 2022, the Electoral district No. 20 was reestablished by the Central Election Commission in the territory of Kostanay Region, which came into effect on 1 January 2023 as a result of the 2022 amendment. The adoption of this amendment marked the reintroduction of a mixed electoral system for electing Mäjilis deputies, with the use of numbered constituencies being reinstated for the first time since 2004. It made its debut in the 2023 legislative election, with Erkin Äbil becoming the elected representative of the constituency.

== Deputies ==
| Election | Member | Party | % | Representing region |
|---|---|---|---|---|
| 2004 | Oralbek Jaqianov | Independent | 52.5 | Almaty Region |
| 2007 | Defunct (Single-nationwide PR constituency) | | | |
| 2012 | Defunct (Single-nationwide PR constituency) | | | |
| 2016 | Defunct (Single-nationwide PR constituency) | | | |
| 2021 | Defunct (Single-nationwide PR constituency) | | | |
| 2023 | Erkin Äbil | Amanat | 54.2 | Kostanay Region |

== Election results ==
=== 2023 ===
| Candidate | Party | Votes | % |
|---|---|---|---|
| Erkin Äbil | Amanat | 192,175 | 54.17 |
| Berikjan Qaiypbai | Auyl | 26,002 | 7.33 |
| Almagül Qaibajanova | Independent | 18,093 | 5.10 |
| Dias Nurmağambetov | Independent | 17,329 | 4.88 |
| Bolat Äbişev | Independent | 17,032 | 4.80 |
| Roman Maqsut | Independent | 16,013 | 4.51 |
| Säbit Nurğaliev | Independent | 15,952 | 4.50 |
| Damir Jaqanov | Nationwide Social Democratic Party | 15,720 | 4.43 |
| Anton Fabry | Independent | 15,079 | 4.25 |
| Älibek Mahambet | Independent | 13,945 | 3.93 |
| Against all | | 7,409 | 2.09 |
| Total | | 354,749 | 100.00 |
| Valid votes | | 354,749 | 98.37 |
| Invalid/blank votes | | 5,866 | 1.63 |
| Total votes | | 360,615 | 100.00 |
| Registered voters/turnout | | 554,655 | 65.02 |
| Amanat gain | | | |
Source: CEC
