= Kazakhstan's 28th electoral district =

Single-mandate territorial constituency in Kazakhstan

Electoral district No. 28
- Kazakh: №28 сайлау округі Russian: Избирательный округ №28
- Single-mandate constituency for the Mäjilis
- Region: East Kazakhstan Region (2004–2007); Ulytau Region (2022–present)
- Population: 221,663 (2023)
- Electorate: 141,285 (2023)
- Major settlements: Jezkazgan (seat)

Current constituency
- Created: 2004; 2022 (re-established)
- Seats: 1
- Party: Amanat
- Deputy: Erbolat Satybaldin
- Elected: 2023

The Electoral district No. 28 (Kazakh: №28 сайлау округі, romanized: №28 sailau okrugı; Russian: Избирательный округ №28) is a single-mandate territorial constituency in Kazakhstan, represented in the lower chamber Mäjilis of the Parliament. It covers the entirety of Ulytau Region, including all its regional districts, with its seat being centered in Jezkazgan.

The constituency was originally formed for the 2004 legislative election and existed until being abolished in 2007. However, it has been reestablished in 2022 and is currently represented by deputy Erbolat Satybaldin (Amanat) since March 2023.

== Geography ==
The Electoral district No. 28 is situated in the territory of Ulytau Region, and its administrative center, Jezkazgan, serves as the seat of the constituency. The electoral district shares borders with No. 19 (Karaganda Region) to the northeast, No. 20 (Kostanay Region) to the northwest, No. 10 (Aktobe Region) to the west, along with No. 21 (Kyzylorda Region), No. 26 (Turkistan Region) and No. 16 (Jambyl Region) to the south.

== History ==
The Electoral district No. 28 was formed for the 2004 legislative election as a result of redistribution originally within the boundaries of East Kazakhstan Region, and Vera Sukhorukova served as deputy from the constituency. From there, the electoral district continued to exist until its dissolution following the 2007 amendment, which led to the abolition of all constituencies as part of the transition from a mixed-member majoritarian representation to a fully party-list proportional representation system. The change affected the composition of all seats in the lower chamber Mäjilis of the Kazakh Parliament beginning with the 2007 legislative election.

In December 2022, the Electoral district No. 28 was reestablished by the Central Election Commission in the territory of Ulytau Region, which came into effect on 1 January 2023 as a result of the 2022 amendment. The adoption of this amendment marked the reintroduction of a mixed electoral system for electing Mäjilis deputies, with the use of numbered constituencies being reinstated for the first time since 2004. It made its debut in the 2023 legislative election, with Erbolat Satybaldin becoming the elected representative of the constituency.

== Deputies ==
Election	Member	Party	%	Representing region
2004	Vera Sukhorukova	Asar	65.8	East Kazakhstan Region
2007	Defunct (Single-nationwide PR constituency)			
2012	Defunct (Single-nationwide PR constituency)			
2016	Defunct (Single-nationwide PR constituency)			
2021	Defunct (Single-nationwide PR constituency)			
2023	Erbolat Satybaldin	Amanat	56.0	Turkistan Region

== Election results ==
=== 2023 ===
Candidate	Party	Votes	%
Erbolat Satybaldin	Amanat	44,406	55.95
Dulat Süleimenov	Independent	8,016	10.10
Rauşan Qojabaeva	Independent	5,650	7.12
Qazbek Maigeldinov	Baytaq	4,905	6.18
Ermek Baituğanov	Auyl	4,638	5.84
Nurjan Saparov	People's Party of Kazakhstan	3,422	4.31
Ayan Trahpanov	Independent	2,750	3.46
Erlan Tölenov	Independent	2,530	3.19
Against all		3,055	3.85
Total		79,372	100.00
Valid votes		79,372	96.43
Invalid/blank votes		2,936	3.57
Total votes		82,308	100.00
Registered voters/turnout		141,285	58.26
Amanat gain			
Source: CEC
