= Kazakhstan's 29th electoral district =

Single-mandate territorial constituency in Kazakhstan

Electoral district No. 29
- Kazakh: №29 сайлау округі Russian: Избирательный округ №29
- Single-mandate constituency for the Mäjilis
- Region: East Kazakhstan Region (2004–2007, 2022–present)
- Population: 729,997 (2023)
- Electorate: 499,206 (2023)
- Major settlements: Oskemen (seat) and Ridder

Current constituency
- Created: 2004; 2022 (re-established)
- Seats: 1
- Party: Amanat
- Deputy: Luqbek Tumaşinov
- Elected: 2023

The Electoral district No. 29 (Kazakh: №29 сайлау округі, romanized: №29 sailau okrugı; Russian: Избирательный округ №29) is a single-mandate territorial constituency in Kazakhstan, represented in the lower chamber Mäjilis of the Parliament. It covers the entirety of East Kazakhstan Region, including all its regional districts, with its seat being centered in Oskemen.

The constituency was originally formed for the 2004 legislative election and existed until being abolished in 2007. However, it has been reestablished in 2022 and is currently represented by deputy Luqbek Tumaşinov (Amanat) since March 2023.

== Geography ==
The Electoral district No. 29 is situated in the territory of East Kazakhstan Region, and its administrative center, Oskemen, serves as the seat of the constituency. The electoral district shares borders with No. 8 (Abai Region) to the west.

== History ==
The Electoral district No. 29 was formed for the 2004 legislative election as a result of redistribution originally within the boundaries of East Kazakhstan Region, and Viktor Yegorov served as deputy from the constituency. From there, the electoral district continued to exist until its dissolution following the 2007 amendment, which led to the abolition of all constituencies as part of the transition from a mixed-member majoritarian representation to a fully party-list proportional representation system. The change affected the composition of all seats in the lower chamber Mäjilis of the Kazakh Parliament beginning with the 2007 legislative election.

In December 2022, the Electoral district No. 29 was reestablished by the Central Election Commission in the territory of East Kazakhstan Region, which came into effect on 1 January 2023 as a result of the 2022 amendment. The adoption of this amendment marked the reintroduction of a mixed electoral system for electing Mäjilis deputies, with the use of numbered constituencies being reinstated for the first time since 2004. It made its debut in the 2023 legislative election, with Luqbek Tumaşinov becoming the elected representative of the constituency.

== Deputies ==
Election	Member	Party	%	Representing region
2004	Viktor Yegorov	AIST	56.9	East Kazakhstan Region
2007	Defunct (Single-nationwide PR constituency)			
2012	Defunct (Single-nationwide PR constituency)			
2016	Defunct (Single-nationwide PR constituency)			
2021	Defunct (Single-nationwide PR constituency)			
2023	Luqbek Tumaşinov	Amanat	55.0	East Kazakhstan Region

== Election results ==
=== 2023 ===
Candidate	Party	Votes	%
Luqbek Tumaşinov	Amanat	165,596	54.99
Sergei Bogolomov	Independent	19,609	6.51
Erbol Köbentai	Auyl	16,526	5.49
Altynai Ramazanova	Aq Jol	13,652	4.53
Natalya Denisova	Independent	12,641	4.20
Qalibek Qalioldanov	Independent	11,968	3.97
Aksana Kalenova	People's Party of Kazakhstan	10,097	3.35
Äset Qusaiynov	Independent	9,094	3.02
Jandos Nurğazinov	Independent	8,756	2.91
Anna Kukhareva	Independent	8,275	2.75
Against all		24,920	8.28
Total		301,134	100.00
Valid votes		301,134	94.12
Invalid/blank votes		18,818	5.88
Total votes		319,952	100.00
Registered voters/turnout		499,206	64.09
Amanat gain			
Source: CEC
