= Kazakhstan's 23rd electoral district =

Single-mandate territorial constituency in Kazakhstan

Electoral district No. 23
- Kazakh: №23 сайлау округі Russian: Избирательный округ №23
- Single-mandate constituency for the Mäjilis
- Region: East Kazakhstan Region (2004–2007); Pavlodar Region (2022–present)
- Population: 755,176 (2023)
- Electorate: 512,343 (2023)
- Major settlements: Pavlodar (seat), Aksu and Ekibastuz

Current constituency
- Created: 2004; 2022 (re-established)
- Seats: 1
- Party: Amanat
- Deputy: Jarkynbek Amantai
- Elected: 2023

The Electoral district No. 23 (Kazakh: №23 сайлау округі, romanized: №23 sailau okrugı; Russian: Избирательный округ №23) is a single-mandate territorial constituency in Kazakhstan, represented in the lower chamber Mäjilis of the Parliament. It covers the entirety of Pavlodar Region, including all its regional districts, with its seat being centered in Pavlodar.

The constituency was originally formed for the 2004 legislative election and existed until being abolished in 2007. However, it has been reestablished in 2022 and is currently represented by deputy Jarkynbek Amantai (Amanat) since March 2023.

== Geography ==
The Electoral district No. 23 is situated in the territory of Pavlodar Region, and its administrative center, Pavlodar, serves as the seat of the constituency. The electoral district shares borders with No. 24 (North Kazakhstan Region) and No. 9 (Akmola Region) to the west, along with No. 18 (Karaganda Region) and No. 19 (Karaganda Region) to the southwest, and No. 8 (Abai Region) to the southeast.

== History ==
The Electoral district No. 23 was formed for the 2004 legislative election as a result of redistribution originally within the boundaries of East Kazakhstan Region, and Aleksandr Milyutin served as deputy from the constituency. From there, the electoral district continued to exist until its dissolution following the 2007 amendment, which led to the abolition of all constituencies as part of the transition from a mixed-member majoritarian representation to a fully party-list proportional representation system. The change affected the composition of all seats in the lower chamber Mäjilis of the Kazakh Parliament beginning with the 2007 legislative election.

In December 2022, the Electoral district No. 23 was reestablished by the Central Election Commission in the territory of Pavlodar Region, which came into effect on 1 January 2023 as a result of the 2022 amendment. The adoption of this amendment marked the reintroduction of a mixed electoral system for electing Mäjilis deputies, with the use of numbered constituencies being reinstated for the first time since 2004. It made its debut in the 2023 legislative election, with Jarkynbek Amantai becoming the elected representative of the constituency.

== Deputies ==
Election	Member	Party	%	Representing region
2004	Aleksandr Milyutin	Otan	84.7	East Kazakhstan Region
2007	Defunct (Single-nationwide PR constituency)			
2012	Defunct (Single-nationwide PR constituency)			
2016	Defunct (Single-nationwide PR constituency)			
2021	Defunct (Single-nationwide PR constituency)			
2023	Jarkynbek Amantai	Amanat	56.7	Pavlodar Region

== Election results ==
=== 2023 ===
Candidate	Party	Votes	%
Jarkynbek Amantai	Amanat	168,625	56.69
Rysty Jumabekova	Independent	39,001	13.11
Vladimir Dvoretsky	Independent	24,253	8.15
Fuat Satybayev	Aq Jol	8,434	2.84
Aleksandr Babenko	Independent	7,774	2.61
Fyacheslav Nosik	People's Party of Kazakhstan	7,337	2.47
Zarlyq Timerbekova	Independent	6,989	2.35
Baqytjan Jasqaliev	Independent	6,581	2.21
Sergey Tupitsyn	Independent	6,574	2.21
Isabai Esmağambetov	Independent	5,819	1.96
Azamat Haisin	Nationwide Social Democratic Party	5,666	1.90
Against all		10,408	3.50
Total		297,461	100.00
Valid votes		297,461	99.03
Invalid/blank votes		2,905	0.97
Total votes		300,366	100.00
Registered voters/turnout		512,343	58.63
Amanat gain			
Source: CEC
