= Kazakhstan's 19th electoral district =

Single-mandate territorial constituency in Kazakhstan

Electoral district No. 19
- Kazakh: №19 сайлау округі Russian: Избирательный округ №19
- Single-mandate constituency for the Mäjilis
- District: Abai, Aqtogai, Qarqaraly, Nura, Sarybel and Shet
- Region: Almaty Region (2004–2007); Karaganda Region (2022–present)
- Population: 565,060 (2023)
- Electorate: 379,656 (2023)
- Major settlements: Temirtau (seat), Balkhash, Priozersk, Saran and Shakhtinsk

Current constituency
- Created: 2004; 2022 (re-established)
- Seats: 1
- Party: Amanat
- Deputy: Arman Qalyqov
- Elected: 2023

The Electoral district No. 19 (Kazakh: №19 сайлау округі, romanized: №19 sailau okrugı; Russian: Избирательный округ №19) is a single-mandate territorial constituency in Kazakhstan, represented in the lower chamber Mäjilis of the Parliament. It is one of two constituencies within the Karaganda Region as its seat is centered in Temirtau, which includes the regional districts of Abai, Aqtogai, Qarqaraly, Nura, Sarybel and Shet.

The constituency was originally formed for the 2004 legislative election and existed until being abolished in 2007. However, it has been reestablished in 2022 and is currently represented by deputy Arman Qalyqov (Amanat) since March 2023.

== Geography ==
The Electoral district No. 19 is situated in the territory of Karaganda Region which includes the districts of Abai, Aqtogai, Qarqaraly, Nura, Sarybel and Shet. The city of Temirtau serves as the seat of the constituency. The electoral district shares borders with No. 23 (Pavlodar Region) and No. 18 (Karaganda Region) to the northeast, No. 9 (Akmola Region) to the north, No. 20 (Kostanay Region) to the northwest, No. 28 (Ulytau Region) to the west, No. 16 (Jambyl Region) to the southwest, No. 12 (Almaty Region) and No. 17 (Jetisu Region) to the southeast, and No. 8 (Abai Region) to the east.

== History ==
The Electoral district No. 19 was formed for the 2004 legislative election as a result of redistribution originally within the boundaries of Almaty Region, and Serik Äbdirahmanov served as deputy from the constituency. From there, the electoral district continued to exist until its dissolution following the 2007 amendment, which led to the abolition of all constituencies as part of the transition from a mixed-member majoritarian representation to a fully party-list proportional representation system. The change affected the composition of all seats in the lower chamber Mäjilis of the Kazakh Parliament beginning with the 2007 legislative election.

On 24 December 2022, the Electoral district No. 19 was reestablished by the Central Election Commission in the territory of Karaganda Region, which came into effect on 1 January 2023 as a result of the 2022 amendment. The adoption of this amendment marked the reintroduction of a mixed electoral system for electing Mäjilis deputies, with the use of numbered constituencies being reinstated for the first time since 2004. It made its debut in the 2023 legislative election, with Arman Qalyqov becoming the elected representative of the constituency.

== Deputies ==
Election	Member	Party	%	Representing region
2004	Arman Qalyqov	Otan	55.3	Almaty Region
2007	Defunct (Single-nationwide PR constituency)			
2012	Defunct (Single-nationwide PR constituency)			
2016	Defunct (Single-nationwide PR constituency)			
2021	Defunct (Single-nationwide PR constituency)			
2023	Arman Qalyqov	Amanat	63.8	Karaganda Region

== Election results ==
=== 2023 ===
Candidate	Party	Votes	%
Arman Qalyqov	Amanat	145,228	63.84
Rauan Şaekin	Independent	23,864	10.49
Qanatbek Balsariev	Independent	11,926	5.24
Bolatbek Äbdiräsilov	Independent	10,553	4.64
Vladimir Aleskerov	Independent	8,674	3.81
Talğat Öteubaev	Independent	8,617	3.79
Zağit Jünisov	People's Party of Kazakhstan	6,907	3.04
Marina Shiller	Aq Jol	3,865	1.70
Janbolat Qojabaev	Independent	2,287	1.01
Meiyrjan Dosqaraev	Independent	1,189	0.52
Against all		4,394	1.93
Total		227,504	100.00
Valid votes		227,504	98.60
Invalid/blank votes		3,219	1.40
Total votes		230,723	100.00
Registered voters/turnout		379,656	60.77
Amanat gain			
Source: CEC
