= Kazakhstan's 24th electoral district =

Single-mandate territorial constituency in Kazakhstan

Electoral district No. 24
- Kazakh: №24 сайлау округі Russian: Избирательный округ №24
- Single-mandate constituency for the Mäjilis
- Region: East Kazakhstan Region (2004–2007); North Kazakhstan Region (2022–present)
- Population: 533,378 (2023)
- Electorate: 384,148 (2023)
- Major settlements: Petropavl (seat), Bulayevo, Mamlyut, Sergeyev and Taiynsha

Current constituency
- Created: 2004; 2022 (re-established)
- Seats: 1
- Party: Amanat
- Deputy: Erkebulan Mämbetov
- Elected: 2023

The Electoral district No. 24 (Kazakh: №24 сайлау округі, romanized: №24 sailau okrugı; Russian: Избирательный округ №24) is a single-mandate territorial constituency in Kazakhstan, represented in the lower chamber Mäjilis of the Parliament. It covers the entirety of North Kazakhstan Region, including all its regional districts, with its seat being centered in Petropavl.

The constituency was originally formed for the 2004 legislative election and existed until being abolished in 2007. However, it has been reestablished in 2022 and is currently represented by deputy Erkebulan Mämbetov (Amanat) since March 2023.

== Geography ==
The Electoral district No. 24 is situated in the territory of North Kazakhstan Region, and its administrative center, Petropavl, serves as the seat of the constituency. The electoral district shares borders with No. 20 (Kostanay Region) to the west, No. 9 (Akmola Region) to the south, and No. 23 (Pavlodar Region).

== History ==
The Electoral district No. 24 was formed for the 2004 legislative election as a result of redistribution originally within the boundaries of East Kazakhstan Region, and Erjan Rahmetov served as deputy from the constituency. From there, the electoral district continued to exist until its dissolution following the 2007 amendment, which led to the abolition of all constituencies as part of the transition from a mixed-member majoritarian representation to a fully party-list proportional representation system. The change affected the composition of all seats in the lower chamber Mäjilis of the Kazakh Parliament beginning with the 2007 legislative election.

In December 2022, the Electoral district No. 24 was reestablished by the Central Election Commission in the territory of North Kazakhstan Region, which came into effect on 1 January 2023 as a result of the 2022 amendment. The adoption of this amendment marked the reintroduction of a mixed electoral system for electing Mäjilis deputies, with the use of numbered constituencies being reinstated for the first time since 2004. It made its debut in the 2023 legislative election, with Erkebulan Mämbetov becoming the elected representative of the constituency.

== Deputies ==
Election	Member	Party	%	Representing region
2004	Erjan Rahmetov	Otan	70.5	East Kazakhstan Region
2007	Defunct (Single-nationwide PR constituency)			
2012	Defunct (Single-nationwide PR constituency)			
2016	Defunct (Single-nationwide PR constituency)			
2021	Defunct (Single-nationwide PR constituency)			
2023	Erkebulan Mämbetov	Amanat	63.7	North Kazakhstan Region

== Election results ==
=== 2023 ===
Candidate	Party	Votes	%
Erkebulan Mämbetov	Amanat	153,736	63.73
Oleg Ivanov	Independent	24,436	10.13
Denis Krivosheyev	Independent	19,487	8.08
Orynbai Atyğaev	Independent	6,297	2.61
Muhtar Serikbaev	Independent	5,785	2.40
Ruslan Qaiyrbekov	Independent	5,121	2.12
Käribai Musyrman	Independent	4,452	1.85
Ivan Turkov	Independent	4,151	1.72
Omari Kharbediya	People's Party of Kazakhstan	3,656	1.52
Bauyrjan Esmuqanov	Independent	3,597	1.49
Against all		10,529	4.36
Total		241,247	100.00
Valid votes		241,247	96.33
Invalid/blank votes		9,196	3.67
Total votes		250,443	100.00
Registered voters/turnout		384,148	65.19
Amanat gain			
Source: CEC
