= Kazakhstan's 7th electoral district =

Electoral district No. 7
- Kazakh: №7 сайлау округі Russian: Избирательный округ №7
- Single-mandate constituency for the Mäjilis
- District: Enbekshin, Qaratau, and Al-Farabi
- City: Almaty (2004–2007); Shymkent (2022–present)

Current constituency
- Created: 2004; 2022 (re-established)
- Seats: 1
- Party: Amanat
- Deputy: Bolatbek Najmetdinuly
- Elected: 2023

The Electoral district No. 7 (Kazakh: №7 сайлау округі, romanized: №7 sailau okrugı; Russian: Избирательный округ №7) is a single-member electoral district in Kazakhstan, represented in the lower chamber Mäjilis of the Parliament. It is located in the city of Almaty and includes the districts of Enbekshin, Qaratau, and Al-Farabi.

The constituency was originally formed for the 2004 legislative election and existed until being abolished in 2007. However, it has been reestablished in 2022 and is currently represented by deputy Bolatbek Najmetdinuly (Amanat) since 2023.

== Geography ==
The Electoral district No. 7 is situated in the southwestern part of Shymkent and includes the city districts of Enbekshin, Qaratau, and Al-Farabi. It shares borders with No. 6 (Shymkent) to the southwest and No. 26 (Turkistan Region) to the northwest.

== History ==
The Electoral district No. 7 was formed for the 2004 legislative election as a result of redistribution originally within the boundaries of Almaty, and Küläş Ağataeva served as deputy from the constituency. From there, the electoral district continued to exist until its dissolution following the 2007 constitutional amendment, which led to the abolition of all constituencies as part of the transition from a mixed-member majoritarian representation to a fully party-list proportional representation system. The change affected the composition of all seats in the lower chamber Mäjilis of the Kazakh Parliament beginning with the 2007 legislative election.

On 24 December 2022, the Electoral district No. 7 was reestablished by the Central Election Commission in the city of Shymkent, which came into effect on 1 January 2023 as a result of the 2022 amendment. The adoption of this amendment marked the reintroduction of a mixed electoral system for electing Mäjilis deputies, with the use of numbered constituencies being reinstated for the first time since 2004. It made its debut in the 2023 legislative election, with Bolatbek Najmetdinuly becoming the elected representative of the constituency.

== Deputies ==
Election	Member	Party	%	Representing region
2004	Küläş Ağataeva	Independent	66.0	Almaty
2007	Defunct (Single-nationwide PR constituency)			
2012	Defunct (Single-nationwide PR constituency)			
2016	Defunct (Single-nationwide PR constituency)			
2021	Defunct (Single-nationwide PR constituency)			
2023	Bolatbek Najmetdinuly	Amanat	21.1	Shymkent

== Election results ==
=== 2023 ===
Candidate	Party	Votes	%
Bolatbek Najmetdinuly	Amanat	19,851	21.06
Särsen Pernebekov	Independent	17,603	18.68
Abai Praliev	Independent	17,319	18.37
Dinara Aqbarova	Independent	11,852	12.57
Ömir Şynybekuly	Independent	10,476	11.11
Janserik Musahanuly	Independent	8,517	9.04
Janbolat Öksikbaev	Independent	3,347	3.55
Against all		5,294	5.62
Total		94,259	100.00
Valid votes		94,259	64.12
Invalid/blank votes		52,741	35.88
Total votes		147,000	100.00
Amanat gain			
Source: CEC
