= Kazakhstan's 10th electoral district =

Electoral district No. 10
- Kazakh: №10 сайлау округі Russian: Избирательный округ №10
- Single-mandate constituency for the Mäjilis
- Region: Akmola Region (2004–2007); Aktobe Region (2022–present)
- Population: 931,283 (2023)
- Electorate: 562,698 (2023)
- Major settlements: Aktobe (seat)

Current constituency
- Created: 2004; 2022 (re-established)
- Seats: 1
- Party: Amanat
- Deputy: Qazybek Älişev
- Elected: 2023

The Electoral district No. 10 (Kazakh: №10 сайлау округі, romanized: №10 sailau okrugı; Russian: Избирательный округ №10) is a single-mandate territorial constituency in Kazakhstan, represented in the lower chamber Mäjilis of the Parliament. It covers the entirety of Aktobe Region, including all its regional districts, with its seat being centered in Aktobe.

The constituency was originally formed for the 2004 legislative election and existed until being abolished in 2007. However, it has been reestablished in 2022 and is currently represented by deputy Qazybek Älişev (Amanat) since March 2023.

== Geography ==
The Electoral district No. 10 is situated in the territory of Aktobe Region, and its administrative center, Aktobe, serves as the seat of the constituency. It shares borders with No. 14 (West Kazakhstan Region), No. 13 (Atyrau Region), and No. 22 (Mangystau Region) to the west, No. 21 (Kyzylorda Region) to the south, along with No. 28 (Ulytau Region) and No. 20 (Kostanay Region) to the east.

== History ==
The Electoral district No. 10 was formed for the 2004 legislative election as a result of redistribution originally within the boundaries of Akmola Region, and Zäure Qadyrova served as deputy from the constituency. From there, the electoral district continued to exist until its dissolution following the 2007 constitutional amendment, which led to the abolition of all constituencies as part of the transition from a mixed-member majoritarian representation to a fully party-list proportional representation system. The change affected the composition of all seats in the lower chamber Mäjilis of the Kazakh Parliament beginning with the 2007 legislative election.

On 24 December 2022, the Electoral district No. 10 was reestablished by the Central Election Commission in the Aktobe Region, which came into effect on 1 January 2023 as a result of the 2022 amendment. The adoption of this amendment marked the reintroduction of a mixed electoral system for electing Mäjilis deputies, with the use of numbered constituencies being reinstated for the first time since 2004. It made its debut in the 2023 legislative election, with Qazybek Älişev becoming the elected representative of the constituency.

== Deputies ==
Election	Member	Party	%	Representing region
2004	Zäure Qadyrova	Otan	57.4	Aqmola Region
2007	Defunct (Single-nationwide PR constituency)			
2012	Defunct (Single-nationwide PR constituency)			
2016	Defunct (Single-nationwide PR constituency)			
2021	Defunct (Single-nationwide PR constituency)			
2023	Qazybek Älişev	Amanat	74.5	Aqtöbe Region

== Election results ==
=== 2023 ===
Candidate	Party	Votes	%
Qazybek Älişev	Amanat	238,195	74.51
Tättigül Talaeva	Independent	17,326	5.42
Dinara Ylaiyqova	Independent	11,301	3.54
Güljan Sağandyqova	Independent	10,238	3.20
Qaiyrğali Arystanğaliev	Independent	5,939	1.86
Arman Jigeldi	Independent	4,430	1.39
Laura Amangeldieva	Independent	4,052	1.27
Erjan Särsenov	Independent	3,863	1.21
Sabyrjan Qalmuhambetov	Independent	3,827	1.20
Bolat Qamysbaev	Independent	3,807	1.19
Sansyzbai Quatov	Independent	3,336	1.04
Against all		13,364	4.18
Total		319,678	100.00
Valid votes		319,678	98.06
Invalid/blank votes		6,339	1.94
Total votes		326,017	100.00
Registered voters/turnout		562,698	57.94
Amanat gain			
Source: CEC
