= Kazakhstan's 15th electoral district =

Single-mandate territorial constituency in Kazakhstan

Electoral district No. 15
- Kazakh: №15 сайлау округі Russian: Избирательный округ №15
- Single-mandate constituency for the Mäjilis
- District: Jambyl, Jualy and Talas
- Region: Almaty Region (2004–2007); Jambyl Region (2022–present)
- Population: 677,198 (2023)
- Electorate: 366,728 (2023)
- Major settlements: Taraz (seat)

Current constituency
- Created: 2004; 2022 (re-established)
- Seats: 1
- Party: Amanat
- Deputy: Muqaş Eskendirov
- Elected: 2023

The Electoral district No. 15 (Kazakh: №15 сайлау округі, romanized: №15 sailau okrugı; Russian: Избирательный округ №15) is a single-mandate territorial constituency in Kazakhstan, represented in the lower chamber Mäjilis of the Parliament. It is one of two constituencies within the Jambyl Region as its seat is centered in Taraz, which includes the regional districts of Jambyl, Jualy, and Talas.

The constituency was originally formed for the 2004 legislative election and existed until being abolished in 2007. However, it has been reestablished in 2022 and is currently represented by deputy Muqaş Eskendirov (Amanat) since March 2023.

== Geography ==
The Electoral district No. 15 is situated in the territory of Jambyl Region which includes the districts of Jambyl, Jualy and Talas. Its administrative center, Taraz, serves as the seat of the constituency. The electoral district shares borders with No. 26 (Turkistan Region) to the southwest and No. 16 (Jambyl Region) to the northeast.

== History ==
The Electoral district No. 15 was formed for the 2004 legislative election as a result of redistribution originally within the boundaries of Almaty Region, and Amangeldi Düisekeev served as deputy from the constituency. From there, the electoral district continued to exist until its dissolution following the 2007 constitutional amendment, which led to the abolition of all constituencies as part of the transition from a mixed-member majoritarian representation to a fully party-list proportional representation system. The change affected the composition of all seats in the lower chamber Mäjilis of the Kazakh Parliament beginning with the 2007 legislative election.

On 24 December 2022, the Electoral district No. 15 was reestablished by the Central Election Commission in the territory of Jambyl Region, which came into effect on 1 January 2023 as a result of the 2022 amendment. The adoption of this amendment marked the reintroduction of a mixed electoral system for electing Mäjilis deputies, with the use of numbered constituencies being reinstated for the first time since 2004. It made its debut in the 2023 legislative election, with Muqaş Eskendirov becoming the elected representative of the constituency.

== Deputies ==
Election	Member	Party	%	Representing region
2004	Amangeldi Düisekeev	Otan	58.7	Almaty Region
2007	Defunct (Single-nationwide PR constituency)			
2012	Defunct (Single-nationwide PR constituency)			
2016	Defunct (Single-nationwide PR constituency)			
2021	Defunct (Single-nationwide PR constituency)			
2023	Muqaş Eskendirov	Amanat	48.2	Jambyl Region

== Election results ==
=== 2023 ===
Candidate	Party	Votes	%
Muqaş Eskendirov	Amanat	99,021	48.15
Serik Sälemov	Independent	71,719	34.88
Berik Baimağambetov	Independent	15,287	7.43
Rinat Nuraqbaev	Independent	10,545	5.13
Aibek Nuraliev	Independent	6,334	3.08
Janat Qazaqbai	Independent	2,384	1.16
Against all		349	0.17
Total		205,639	100.00
Valid votes		205,639	98.54
Invalid/blank votes		3,043	1.46
Total votes		208,682	100.00
Registered voters/turnout		366,728	56.90
Amanat gain			
Source: CEC
