= Kazakhstan's 21st electoral district =

Single-mandate territorial constituency in Kazakhstan

Electoral district No. 21
- Kazakh: №21 сайлау округі Russian: Избирательный округ №21
- Single-mandate constituency for the Mäjilis
- Region: Atyrau Region (2004–2007); Kyzylorda Region (2022–present)
- Population: 836,533 (2023)
- Electorate: 486,034 (2023)
- Major settlements: Kyzylorda (seat), Aral and Kazaly.

Current constituency
- Created: 2004; 2022 (re-established)
- Seats: 1
- Party: Amanat
- Deputy: Marhabat Jaiymbetov
- Elected: 2023

The Electoral district No. 21 (Kazakh: №21 сайлау округі, romanized: №21 sailau okrugı; Russian: Избирательный округ №21) is a single-mandate territorial constituency in Kazakhstan, represented in the lower chamber Mäjilis of the Parliament. It covers the entirety of Kyzylorda Region, including all its regional districts, with its seat being centered in Kyzylorda.

The constituency was originally formed for the 2004 legislative election and existed until being abolished in 2007. However, it has been reestablished in 2022 and is currently represented by deputy Marhabat Jaiymbetov (Amanat) since March 2023.

== Geography ==
The Electoral district No. 21 is situated in the territory of Kyzylorda Region, and its administrative center, Kyzylorda, serves as the seat of the constituency. The electoral district shares borders with No. 10 (Aktobe Region) to the northwest, No. 25 (Turkistan Region) to the southeast, No. 26 (Turkistan Region) to the northeast, and No. 28 (Ulytau Region) to the north.

== History ==
The Electoral district No. 21 was formed for the 2004 legislative election as a result of redistribution originally within the boundaries of Atyrau Region, and Nurpeiis Maqaşev served as deputy from the constituency. From there, the electoral district continued to exist until its dissolution following the 2007 amendment, which led to the abolition of all constituencies as part of the transition from a mixed-member majoritarian representation to a fully party-list proportional representation system. The change affected the composition of all seats in the lower chamber Mäjilis of the Kazakh Parliament beginning with the 2007 legislative election.

In December 2022, the Electoral district No. 21 was reestablished by the Central Election Commission in the territory of Kostanay Region, which came into effect on 1 January 2023 as a result of the 2022 amendment. The adoption of this amendment marked the reintroduction of a mixed electoral system for electing Mäjilis deputies, with the use of numbered constituencies being reinstated for the first time since 2004. It made its debut in the 2023 legislative election, with Marhabat Jaiymbetov becoming the elected representative of the constituency.

== Deputies ==
| Election | Member | Party | % | Representing region |
|---|---|---|---|---|
| 2004 | Nurpeiis Maqaşev | Otan | 74.8 | Atyrau Region |
| 2007 | Defunct (Single-nationwide PR constituency) | | | |
| 2012 | Defunct (Single-nationwide PR constituency) | | | |
| 2016 | Defunct (Single-nationwide PR constituency) | | | |
| 2021 | Defunct (Single-nationwide PR constituency) | | | |
| 2023 | Marhabat Jaiymbetov | Amanat | 46.3 | Kyzylorda Region |

== Election results ==
=== 2023 ===
| Candidate | Party | Votes | % |
|---|---|---|---|
| Marhabat Jaiymbetov | Amanat | 148,646 | 46.26 |
| Säbit Pazilov | Independent | 89,697 | 27.91 |
| Ğalym Ämireev | Independent | 27,629 | 8.60 |
| Muhit Törebaev | Independent | 15,360 | 4.78 |
| Baian Düisenbek | Independent | 13,850 | 4.31 |
| Aralbai Qozbaqov | Independent | 9,409 | 2.93 |
| Aralbai Qydyrbaev | Veterans of the GSFG and Group of Warsaw Pact Forces (Independent) | 4,645 | 1.45 |
| Nurbek Däurenbekov | Nationwide Social Democratic Party | 1,635 | 0.51 |
| Nurken Qarjaubaev | Auyl | 1,545 | 0.48 |
| Azhniyaz Shakharov | Independent | 956 | 0.30 |
| Against all | | 7,975 | 2.48 |
| Total | | 321,347 | 100.00 |
| Valid votes | | 321,347 | 98.86 |
| Invalid/blank votes | | 3,713 | 1.14 |
| Total votes | | 325,060 | 100.00 |
| Registered voters/turnout | | 486,034 | 66.88 |
| Amanat gain | | | |
Source: CEC
