= Kazakhstan's 26th electoral district =

Single-mandate territorial constituency in Kazakhstan

Electoral district No. 26
- Kazakh: №26 сайлау округі Russian: Избирательный округ №26
- Single-mandate constituency for the Mäjilis
- District: Sozak, Tulkibas, Tole Bi and Baydibek
- Region: East Kazakhstan Region (2004–2007); Turkistan Region (2022–present)
- Population: 376,509 (2023)
- Electorate: 248,965 (2023)
- Major settlements: Aqsukent (seat) and Kentau

Current constituency
- Created: 2004; 2022 (re-established)
- Seats: 1
- Party: Amanat
- Deputy: Ulasbek Sädibekov
- Elected: 2023

The Electoral district No. 26 (Kazakh: №26 сайлау округі, romanized: №26 sailau okrugı; Russian: Избирательный округ №26) is a single-mandate territorial constituency in Kazakhstan, represented in the lower chamber Mäjilis of the Parliament. It is one of three constituencies within the Turkistan Region as its seat is centered in Turkistan, which includes the regional districts of Otyrar, Ordabasy, Shardara, and Sauran.

The constituency was originally formed for the 2004 legislative election and existed until being abolished in 2007. However, it has been reestablished in 2022 and is currently represented by deputy Ulasbek Sädibekov (Amanat) since March 2023.

== Geography ==
The Electoral district No. 26 is situated in the territory of Turkistan Region which includes the districts of Sozak, Tulkibas, Tole Bi and Baydibek. The village of Aqsukent serves as the seat of the constituency. The electoral district shares borders with No. 28 (Ulytau Region) to the north, No. 21 (Kyzylorda Region) to the west, No. 25 (Turkistan Region) to the southwest, No. 27 (Turkistan Region) to the south, along with No. 15 (Jambyl Region) and No. 16 (Jambyl Region) to the west.

== History ==
The Electoral district No. 26 was formed for the 2004 legislative election as a result of redistribution originally within the boundaries of East Kazakhstan Region, and Tohtarhan Nurahmetov served as deputy from the constituency. From there, the electoral district continued to exist until its dissolution following the 2007 amendment, which led to the abolition of all constituencies as part of the transition from a mixed-member majoritarian representation to a fully party-list proportional representation system. The change affected the composition of all seats in the lower chamber Mäjilis of the Kazakh Parliament beginning with the 2007 legislative election.

In December 2022, the Electoral district No. 26 was reestablished by the Central Election Commission in the territory of Turkistan Region, which came into effect on 1 January 2023 as a result of the 2022 amendment. The adoption of this amendment marked the reintroduction of a mixed electoral system for electing Mäjilis deputies, with the use of numbered constituencies being reinstated for the first time since 2004. It made its debut in the 2023 legislative election, with Ulasbek Sädibekov becoming the elected representative of the constituency.

== Deputies ==
Election	Member	Party	%	Representing region
2004	Tohtarhan Nurahmetov	Independent	68.7	East Kazakhstan Region
2007	Defunct (Single-nationwide PR constituency)			
2012	Defunct (Single-nationwide PR constituency)			
2016	Defunct (Single-nationwide PR constituency)			
2021	Defunct (Single-nationwide PR constituency)			
2023	Ulasbek Sädibekov	Amanat	54.5	Turkistan Region

== Election results ==
=== 2023 ===
Candidate	Party	Votes	%
Ulasbek Sädibekov	Amanat	92,445	54.45
Jasur Momynjanov	Independent	29,602	17.44
Oralbek Botbai	Independent	16,683	9.83
Qairat Eraliev	Independent	9,833	5.79
Jandäulet Şakibaev	Independent	8,270	4.87
Nurlan Qylyşbekov	Independent	6,695	3.94
Against all		6,251	3.68
Total		169,779	100.00
Valid votes		169,779	94.73
Invalid/blank votes		9,450	5.27
Total votes		179,229	100.00
Registered voters/turnout		248,965	71.99
Amanat gain			
Source: CEC
