= Kazakhstan's 8th electoral district =

Electoral district No. 8
- Kazakh: №8 сайлау округі Russian: Избирательный округ №8
- Single-mandate constituency for the Mäjilis
- District: Abai, Altai, Ayagoz, Beskaragay, Borodulikha, Kokpekti, Tarbagatay, Urzhar, and Zharma.
- Region: Akmola Region (2004–2007); Abai Region (2022–present)
- Population: 610,149 (2023)
- Electorate: 416,191 (2023)
- Major settlements: Semey (seat) and Kurchatov

Current constituency
- Created: 2004; 2022 (re-established)
- Seats: 1
- Party: Amanat
- Deputy: Nurtai Sabilianov
- Elected: 2023

The Electoral district No. 8 (Kazakh: №8 сайлау округі, romanized: №8 sailau okrugı; Russian: Избирательный округ №8) is a single-mandate territorial constituency in Kazakhstan, represented in the lower chamber Mäjilis of the Parliament. It covers the entirety of Abai Region, including all its regional districts, with its seat being located in Semey.

The constituency was originally formed for the 2004 legislative election and existed until being abolished in 2007. However, it has been reestablished in 2022 and is currently represented by deputy Nurtai Sabilianov (Amanat) since March 2023.

== Geography ==
The Electoral district No. 8 is situated in the territory of Abai Region, and its administrative center, Semey, serves as the seat of the electoral district. It shares borders with No. 23 (Pavlodar Region) to the northwest, No. 19 (Karaganda Region) to the southwest, No. 17 (Jetisu Region) to the south, and No. 29 (East Kazakhstan Region) to the east.

== History ==
The Electoral district No. 8 was formed for the 2004 legislative election as a result of redistribution originally within the boundaries of Akmola Region, and Baibol Ötepbaev served as deputy from the constituency. From there, the electoral district continued to exist until its dissolution following the 2007 constitutional amendment, which led to the abolition of all constituencies as part of the transition from a mixed-member majoritarian representation to a fully party-list proportional representation system. The change affected the composition of all seats in the lower chamber Mäjilis of the Kazakh Parliament beginning with the 2007 legislative election.

On 24 December 2022, the Electoral district No. 8 was reestablished by the Central Election Commission in the Abai Region, which came into effect on 1 January 2023 as a result of the 2022 amendment. The adoption of this amendment marked the reintroduction of a mixed electoral system for electing Mäjilis deputies, with the use of numbered constituencies being reinstated for the first time since 2004. It made its debut in the 2023 legislative election, with Nurtai Sabilianov becoming the elected representative of the constituency.

== Deputies ==
Election	Member	Party	%	Representing region
2004	Baibol Ötepbaev	Independent	51.7	Aqmola Region
2007	Defunct (Single-nationwide PR constituency)			
2012	Defunct (Single-nationwide PR constituency)			
2016	Defunct (Single-nationwide PR constituency)			
2021	Defunct (Single-nationwide PR constituency)			
2023	Nurtai Sabilianov	Amanat	58.0	Abai Region

== Election results ==
=== 2023 ===
Candidate	Party	Votes	%
Nurtai Sabilianov	Amanat	131,872	58.02
Ashat Januzaqov	Independent	28,841	12.69
Güljanat Rahatqyzy	Aq Jol	19,891	8.75
Erlan Qaliev	Independent	10,969	4.83
Ashat Qulimanov	Independent	7,440	3.27
Ğalym Bekov	Independent	6,856	3.02
Quanyş Bäkirlanov	Independent	4,064	1.79
Against all		17,339	7.63
Total		227,272	100.00
Valid votes		227,272	96.28
Invalid/blank votes		8,779	3.72
Total votes		236,051	100.00
Registered voters/turnout		416,191	56.72
Amanat gain			
Source: CEC
