= Kazakhstan's 16th electoral district =

Single-mandate territorial constituency in Kazakhstan

Electoral district No. 16
- Kazakh: №16 сайлау округі Russian: Избирательный округ №16
- Single-mandate constituency for the Mäjilis
- District: Moiynkum, Sarysu, Bayzak, Turar Ryskulov, Merki, Shu and Korday
- Region: Almaty Region (2004–2007); Jambyl Region (2022–present)
- Population: 543,345 (2023)
- Electorate: 350,388 (2023)
- Major settlements: Kulan (seat)

Current constituency
- Created: 2004; 2022 (re-established)
- Seats: 1
- Party: Amanat
- Deputy: Güldara Nurymova
- Elected: 2023

The Electoral district No. 16 (Kazakh: №16 сайлау округі, romanized: №16 sailau okrugı; Russian: Избирательный округ №16) is a single-mandate territorial constituency in Kazakhstan, represented in the lower chamber Mäjilis of the Parliament. It is one of two constituencies within the Jambyl Region as its seat is centered in Kulan, which includes the regional districts of Moiynkum, Sarysu, Bayzak, Turar Ryskulov, Merki, Shu, and Korday.

The constituency was originally formed for the 2004 legislative election and existed until being abolished in 2007. However, it has been reestablished in 2022 and is currently represented by deputy Güldara Nurymova (Amanat) since March 2023.

== Geography ==
The Electoral district No. 16 is situated in the territory of Jambyl Region which includes the districts of Moiynkum, Sarysu, Bayzak, Turar Ryskulov, Merki, Shu, and Korday. The village of Kulan serves as the seat of the constituency. The electoral district shares borders with No. 19 (Karaganda Region) and No. 28 (Ulytau Region) to the north, No. 26 (Turkistan Region) to the west, No. 15 (Jambyl Region) to the southwest, and No. 12 (Almaty Region) to the east.

== History ==
The Electoral district No. 16 was formed for the 2004 legislative election as a result of redistribution originally within the boundaries of Almaty Region, and Uälihan Qalijanov served as deputy from the constituency. From there, the electoral district continued to exist until its dissolution following the 2007 constitutional amendment, which led to the abolition of all constituencies as part of the transition from a mixed-member majoritarian representation to a fully party-list proportional representation system. The change affected the composition of all seats in the lower chamber Mäjilis of the Kazakh Parliament beginning with the 2007 legislative election.

On 24 December 2022, the Electoral district No. 16 was reestablished by the Central Election Commission in the territory of Jambyl Region, which came into effect on 1 January 2023 as a result of the 2022 amendment. The adoption of this amendment marked the reintroduction of a mixed electoral system for electing Mäjilis deputies, with the use of numbered constituencies being reinstated for the first time since 2004. It made its debut in the 2023 legislative election, with Güldara Nurymova becoming the elected representative of the constituency.

== Deputies ==
Election	Member	Party	%	Representing region
2004	Uälihan Qalijanov	Otan	65.3	Almaty Region
2007	Defunct (Single-nationwide PR constituency)			
2012	Defunct (Single-nationwide PR constituency)			
2016	Defunct (Single-nationwide PR constituency)			
2021	Defunct (Single-nationwide PR constituency)			
2023	Güldara Nurymova	Amanat	74.9	Jambyl Region

== Election results ==
=== 2023 ===
Candidate	Party	Votes	%
Güldara Nurymova	Amanat	190,078	74.89
Madina Jatqanbaeva	Aq Jol	26,628	10.49
Nurjan Joldasbekov	Independent	13,561	5.34
Daniar Medetbekov	Independent	13,412	5.28
Almaz Bekeşov	Independent	4,940	1.95
Tañat Otarbaev	Independent	3,501	1.38
Against all		1,699	0.67
Total		253,819	100.00
Valid votes		253,819	98.13
Invalid/blank votes		4,825	1.87
Total votes		258,644	100.00
Registered voters/turnout		350,388	73.82
Amanat gain			
Source: CEC
