= Constituencies of Kazakhstan =

Constituencies of Kazakhstan (Kazakh: Сайлау округтері, romanized: Sailau okrugterı), also known as single-mandate territorial constituencies (Kazakh: бірмандаттық аумақтық сайлау округтері, romanized: bırmandattyq aumaqtyq sailau okrugterı) are a series of single-member districts in Kazakhstan used to represent and elect members of lower house Mäjilis in the Parliament. These electoral districts, along with party-list proportional representation seats, constitute a single system of mixed-member majoritarian representation, with 29 members from each constituency being represented in the elected body of the Mäjilis.

The history of electoral districts in Kazakhstan date back to the Communist era, when lawmakers represented every constituency in the Supreme Soviet of the Kazakh SSR. In the early 1990s, during Kazakhstan's independence, a mixed electoral system was introduced and eventually led to the reduction of seats in the Mäjilis and replacement with full proportional representation after the 2007 amendments. However, the mixed system was reinstated after the 2022 referendum, thus restoring a number of previously dissolved electoral districts of the Mäjilis.

Under Article 12 of the Constitutional Law "On Elections", the Central Election Commission oversees formation of Mäjilis electoral districts in each region and city of republican significance (Almaty, Astana, and Shymkent). Each administrative division must have at least one constituent seat to be ensured with representation in the Mäjilis.

== List ==
| No. | Region | Seat | Bordering areas | Ref. |
|---|---|---|---|---|
| 1 | Astana | | Almaty District and Baiqonyr District | |
| 2 | Astana | | Esil District and Saryarqa District | |
| 3 | Almaty | | Alatau District and Auezov District | |
| 4 | Almaty | | Almaly District, Jetysu District, and Turksib District | |
| 5 | Almaty | | Bostandyq District, Medeu District, and Nauryzbai District | |
| 6 | Shymkent | | Abai District, Turan District, parts of Al-Farabi District | |
| 7 | Shymkent | | Enbekshin District, Qaratau District, parts of Al-Farabi District | |
| 8 | Abai Region | Semey | Entirety of Abai Region | |
| 9 | Akmola Region | Kokshetau | Entirety of Akmola Region | |
| 10 | Aktobe Region | Aktobe | Entirety of Aktobe Region | |
| 11 | Almaty Region | Qonaev | City of Qonaev, Enbekshikazakh District, Kegen District, Raiymbek District, Talgar District, and Uygur District | |
| 12 | Almaty Region | Kaskelen | Karasay District, Ile District, Jambyl District, and Balkhash District | |
| 13 | Atyrau Region | Atyrau | Entirety of Atyrau Region | |
| 14 | West Kazakhstan Region | Oral | Entirety of West Kazakhstan Region | |
| 15 | Jambyl Region | Taraz | City of Taraz, Jambyl District, Jualy District, and Talas District | |
| 16 | Jambyl Region | Kulan | Moiynkum District, Sarysu District, Bayzak District, Turar Ryskulov District, Merki District, Shu District and Korday District | |
| 17 | Jetisu Region | Taldykorgan | Entirety of Jetisu Region | |
| 18 | Karaganda Region | Karaganda | City of Karaganda and Bukhar-Zhyrau District | |
| 19 | Karaganda Region | Temirtau | City of Temirtau, City of Balkhash, City of Priozersk, City of Saran, City of Shakhtinsk, Abay District, Aktogay District, Karkaraly District, Nura District, Osakarov District, and Shet District | |
| 20 | Kostanay Region | Kostanay | Entirety of Kostanay Region | |
| 21 | Kyzylorda Region | Kyzylorda | Entirety of Kyzylorda Region | |
| 22 | Mangystau Region | Aktau | Entirety of Mangystau Region | |
| 23 | Pavlodar Region | Pavlodar | Entirety of Pavlodar Region | |
| 24 | North Kazakhstan Region | Petropavl | Entirety of North Kazakhstan Region | |
| 25 | Turkistan Region | Turkistan | City of Arys, City of Otrar, Ordabasy District, Shardara District, and Sauran District | |
| 26 | Turkistan Region | Aqsukent | City of Kentau, Sozak District, Tulkibas District, Tole Bi District, and Baydibek District | |
| 27 | Turkistan Region | Saryagash | Saryagash District, Keles District, Kazygurt District, Maktaaral District, and Jetisai District | |
| 28 | Ulytau Region | Jezkazgan | Entirety of Ulytau Region | |
| 29 | East Kazakhstan Region | Oskemen | Entirety of East Kazakhstan Region | |
