= Kazakhstan's 12th electoral district =

Electoral district No. 12
- Kazakh: №12 сайлау округі Russian: Избирательный округ №12
- Single-mandate constituency for the Mäjilis
- Region: Aktobe Region (2004–2007); Almaty Region (2022–present)
- Population: 964,419 (2023)
- Electorate: 493,732 (2023)
- Major settlements: Kaskelen (seat)

Current constituency
- Created: 2004; 2022 (re-established)
- Seats: 1
- Party: Independent
- Deputy: Daniar Qasqaraurov
- Elected: 2023

The Electoral district No. 12 (Kazakh: №12 сайлау округі, romanized: №12 sailau okrugı; Russian: Избирательный округ №12) is a single-mandate territorial constituency in Kazakhstan, represented in the lower chamber Mäjilis of the Parliament. It is one of two constituencies within the Almaty Region as its seat is centered in Kaskelen, which includes the regional districts of Balkhash, Ile, Jambyl, and Karasay.

The constituency was originally formed for the 2004 legislative election and existed until being abolished in 2007. However, it has been reestablished in 2022 and is currently represented by deputy Daniar Qasqaraurov (Independent) since March 2023.

== Geography ==
The Electoral district No. 12 is situated in the territory of Almaty Region which includes the districts of Balkhash, Ile, Jambyl, and Karasay. Its administrative center, Kaskelen, serves as the seat of the constituency. The electoral district shares borders with No. 19 (Karaganda Region) to the north, No. 16 (Jambyl Region) to the west, along with No. 5 (Almaty), No. 3 (Almaty), No. 4 (Almaty), and No. 11 (Almaty Region) to the southwest, and No. 17 (Jetisu Region) to the northeast.

== History ==
The Electoral district No. 12 was formed for the 2004 legislative election as a result of redistribution originally within the boundaries of Aktobe Region, and Aitaly Äbdirahmanuly served as deputy from the constituency. From there, the electoral district continued to exist until its dissolution following the 2007 constitutional amendment, which led to the abolition of all constituencies as part of the transition from a mixed-member majoritarian representation to a fully party-list proportional representation system. The change affected the composition of all seats in the lower chamber Mäjilis of the Kazakh Parliament beginning with the 2007 legislative election.

On 24 December 2022, the Electoral district No. 12 was reestablished by the Central Election Commission in the Almaty Region, which came into effect on 1 January 2023 as a result of the 2022 amendment. The adoption of this amendment marked the reintroduction of a mixed electoral system for electing Mäjilis deputies, with the use of numbered constituencies being reinstated for the first time since 2004. It made its debut in the 2023 legislative election, with Daniar Qasqaraurov becoming the elected representative of the constituency.

== Deputies ==
Election	Member	Party	%	Representing region
2004	Aitaly Äbdirahmanuly	AIST	58.0	Aqtöbe Region
2007	Defunct (Single-nationwide PR constituency)			
2012	Defunct (Single-nationwide PR constituency)			
2016	Defunct (Single-nationwide PR constituency)			
2021	Defunct (Single-nationwide PR constituency)			
2023	Daniar Qasqaraurov	Independent	46.7	Almaty Region

== Election results ==
=== 2023 ===
Candidate	Party	Votes	%
Daniar Qasqaraurov	Independent	153,225	46.77
Sydyq Davletov	Amanat	71,071	21.69
Qairat Baibaqtinov	Independent	27,403	8.36
Berik Ältaev	Aq Jol	14,589	4.45
Qazybekbi Büitekuly	Independent	11,257	3.44
Duman Muhammedkärim	Independent	9,962	3.04
Bağdat Amandosuly	Independent	6,992	2.13
Abylai Baqytjan	Independent	7,497	2.29
Bağdäulet Östenov	Independent	5,240	1.60
Toqtar Jaqaşov	Independent	3,146	0.96
Others		5,402	1.65
Against all		11,831	3.61
Total		327,615	100.00
Valid votes		327,615	98.79
Invalid/blank votes		4,008	1.21
Total votes		331,623	100.00
Registered voters/turnout		493,732	67.17
Independent gain			
Source: CEC
