= Kazakhstan's 9th electoral district =

Electoral district No. 9
- Kazakh: №9 сайлау округі Russian: Избирательный округ №9
- Single-mandate constituency for the Mäjilis
- District: Akkol, Arshaly, Astrakhan, Atbasar, Birjan sal, Bulandy, Burabay, Egindikol, Ereymentau, Esil, Korgalzhyn, Sandyktau, Shortandy, Tselinograd, Zerendi, Zhaksy, and Zharkain
- Region: Akmola Region
- Population: 788,547 (2023)
- Electorate: 517,816 (2023)
- Major settlements: Kokshetau (seat) and Stepnogorsk

Current constituency
- Created: 2004; 2022 (re-established)
- Seats: 1
- Party: Amanat
- Deputy: Aina Mysyrälimova
- Elected: 2023

The Electoral district No. 9 (Kazakh: №9 сайлау округі, romanized: №9 sailau okrugı; Russian: Избирательный округ №9) is a single-mandate territorial constituency in Kazakhstan, represented in the lower chamber Mäjilis of the Parliament. It covers the entirety of Akmola Region, including all its regional districts, with its seat being located in Kokshetau.

The constituency was originally formed for the 2004 legislative election and existed until being abolished in 2007. However, it has been reestablished in 2022 and is currently represented by deputy Aina Mysyrälimova (Amanat) since March 2023.

== Geography ==
The Electoral district No. 9 is situated in the territory of Akmola Region, and its administrative center, Kokshetau, serves as the seat of the constituency. It shares borders with No. 24 (North Kazakhstan Region) to the north, No. 20 (Kostanay Region) to the west, No. 19 (Karaganda Region) to the south, and No. 23 (Pavlodar Region) to east.

== History ==
The Electoral district No. 9 was formed for the 2004 legislative election as a result of redistribution originally within the boundaries of Akmola Region, and Valery Kotovich served as deputy from the constituency. From there, the electoral district continued to exist until its dissolution following the 2007 constitutional amendment, which led to the abolition of all constituencies as part of the transition from a mixed-member majoritarian representation to a fully party-list proportional representation system. The change affected the composition of all seats in the lower chamber Mäjilis of the Kazakh Parliament beginning with the 2007 legislative election.

On 24 December 2022, the Electoral district No. 9 was reestablished by the Central Election Commission in the Akmola Region, which came into effect on 1 January 2023 as a result of the 2022 amendment. The adoption of this amendment marked the reintroduction of a mixed electoral system for electing Mäjilis deputies, with the use of numbered constituencies being reinstated for the first time since 2004. It made its debut in the 2023 legislative election, with Aina Mysyrälimova becoming the elected representative of the constituency.

== Deputies ==
Election	Member	Party	%	Representing region
2004	Valery Kotovich	Otan	76.1	Aqmola Region
2007	Defunct (Single-nationwide PR constituency)			
2012	Defunct (Single-nationwide PR constituency)			
2016	Defunct (Single-nationwide PR constituency)			
2021	Defunct (Single-nationwide PR constituency)			
2023	Aina Mysyrälimova	Amanat	50.7	Aqmola Region

== Election results ==
=== 2023 ===
Candidate	Party	Votes	%
Aina Mysyrälimova	Amanat	154,587	50.72
Arman Berdalin	Independent	41,708	13.68
Meruert Qazbekova	Aq Jol	31,738	10.41
Saian Muhamediar	Independent	25,469	8.36
Nartai Ysqaqov	Auyl	24,175	7.93
Konstantin Kotovich	Independent	5,735	1.88
Aleksandr Lapitan	Independent	5,394	1.77
Omar Jumagulov	Independent	3,330	1.09
Valery Smokvin	Nationwide Social Democratic Party	3,312	1.09
Erjan Aqynov	Independent	2,147	0.70
Against all		7,190	2.36
Total		304,785	100.00
Valid votes		304,785	98.13
Invalid/blank votes		5,809	1.87
Total votes		310,594	100.00
Registered voters/turnout		517,816	59.98
Amanat gain			
Source: CEC
