= 5th Congress of the Ak Zhol Democratic Party =

2005 Aq Jol chairmanship election
13 March 2005	2011 →
- Turnout: 78.01%
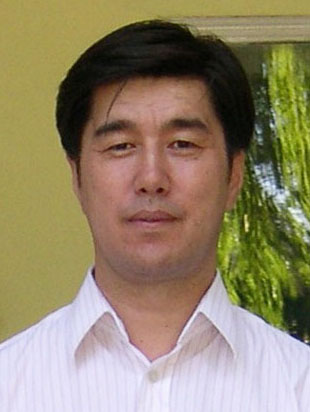
Candidate	Alikhan Baimenov
Party	Ak Zhol
Delegate vote	149
Percentage	100%
Elected Chairman
Alikhan Baimenov

The 5th Congress of the Ak Zhol Democratic Party was held on 13 March 2005. Co-chairman Alikhan Baimenov was unanimously elected by the 149 delegates to be its first single chairman.

== Background ==
Following the 2004 Kazakh legislative election, a 5th Congress of Ak Zhol was held in Astana over growing division between the members of the party. One the group, represented by co-chairs Altynbek Sarsenbayuly, Bulat Abilov, Oraz Jandosov and some members of the Presidium, is that party only represents leaders and money. They believed that by uniting citizens under the slogans of a constructive opposition and registering a party, can manipulate both party members and regional organizations, as well as members of the party's collegian governing bodies. As a result, this led to the fact that the party almost began to be regarded as an instrument in political games. Such an approach, with its disastrous character, has led to a low efficiency of the process of implementing the party's initiative to unite a democratic opposition. Another group, presented by the party co-chairs Alikhan Baimenov and L. Zhulanova, a significant number of the members of the Central Council and supported by the overwhelming majority of party members, is expressed in the initial reliance on constant communication with the asset and regions and is most consistent with the mood and society, and party asset.

== Procedure ==
Of the 191 delegates elected at conferences of regional and city branches of the party, 149 people participated in the congress, representing all branches of the party, which ensured the legitimacy of the congress. On the agenda of the congress, such basic issues as the situation in the party, the priority tasks of the party and the introduction of amendments to the Party Charter were approved and considered.

Of the five co-chairperson's of the party, Alikhan Baimenov and Lyudmila Zhulanova, who made presentations, were present at the congress. In their reports, they assessed the situation in the party, expressed their proposals on overcoming the crisis in the party leadership, as well as on the further activities of the party. The debate on the two first issues on the agenda was also addressed by 22 congress delegates.

During the work of the congress, co-chairman Baimenov asked the congress to accept his resignation, justifying this with his personal responsibility for the critical situation in the party's leadership and the need to preserve the party. However, the congress unanimously rejected Baimenov's request for resignation.

The congress also introduced changes to the Party Charter, the most important of which were changes in the structure and composition of the party's governing bodies. When discussing changes to the Party Charter, a number of delegates including Baimenov himself proposed keeping the institution of co-chairs in the party. However, by a majority vote of 122 delegates, the congress supported the abolition of the institution of co-chairs and the introduction of the posts of party chairman and deputy chairman. On the basis of this decision, the congress unanimously elected Alikhan Baymenov as party chairman and Lyudmila Zhulanova as a deputy. Based on these changes to the Party Charter and the Decree "On the Situation in the Party and Priority Measures to Ensure Unity of Party Rows", the congress approved the number of members of the Central Council at 91 people and the Presidium of the Central Council at 17 people and elected the composition of these bodies. The congress elected the Central Control and Revision Commission at 21 people, Vitaly Erokhin was elected its chairman.

== Aftermath ==
As a result of the congress's decision in abolishing co-chair structure, the party officially became split on 15 March 2005. The faction, led by Bulat Abilov, Oraz Jandosov, Altynbek Sarsenbayuly, and Tulegen Zhukeyev formed the Naghyz Ak Zhol (meaning Bright True Path) party.
