= Zaure Kadyrova =

Kazakh political scientist

Zaure Zhussupkyzy Kadyrova (Kazakh: Зәуре Жүсіпқызы Қадырова, Zäure Jüsıpqyzy Qadyrova; born in 1940 in Saryzhaz) is a Kazakh political scientist.

== Life ==
Kadyrova graduated from the Kazakh State Women's Pedagogical Institute (1963) and graduated from the Higher Party School of the CPSU Central Committee (1973).

She became the director of Tisikakan School of Tselinograd region in 1965, a promoter propaganda department of Zhaksyn Party Committee in 1967, secretary of Shortandinsk district committee of Kazakhstan Communist Party of Tselinograd region in 1969. She also became the chairman of the Committee for Social and Cultural Development.

She was awarded the Order of the Republic of Kazakhstan, the Order of the USSR and medals.
