= People's Party of Kazakhstan =

Political party in Kazakhstan

People's Party of Kazakhstan Қазақстан халық партиясы (Kazakh) Народная партия Казахстана (Russian)
- Abbreviation: QHP (Kazakh); НПК (Russian)
- Chairman: Nursultan Şoqanov
- Deputy chairmen: Nail Saifullin; Magherram Magherramov; Ashat Asylbekov; Miras Aukenov
- Parliamentary chair: Magherram Magherramov
- Founders: Vladislav Kosarev; Töleş Kenjïn; Alexander Kholodkov
- Founded: 13 April 2004; 22 years ago (as the Communist People's Party of Kazakhstan)
- Registered: 21 June 2004; 22 years ago
- Split from: Communist Party of Kazakhstan
- Headquarters: Qabanbai Batyr Avenue, Astana
- Membership (2008): 56,292
- Ideology: Social democracy; Progressivism; 2004–2020: Communism; Marxism–Leninism
- Political position: Centre-left; 2004–2020: Far-left
- National affiliation: People's Coalition (2022)
- Colours: Red
- Kurultai: 0 / 145
- Regional mäslihats: 7 / 489
- Municipal mäslihats: 79 / 2,757

Website
- halykpartiyasy.kz

The People's Party of Kazakhstan (Note: Kazakh: Қазақстанның Халық Партиясы, romanized: Qazaqstannyñ Halyq Partiasy, QHP; Russian: Народная партия Казахстана, romanized: Narodnaya partiya Kazakhstana, NPK) is a social democratic and progressive political party in Kazakhstan. The party is chaired by Nursultan Şoqanov and the secretaries of the central committee are Turgyn Syzdyqov, Gauhar Nugmanova, Viktor Smirnov and Jambyl Ahmetbekov.

The party was founded as the Communist People's Party of Kazakhstan (QKHP) (Note: Kazakh: Қазақстан Коммунистік Халық Партиясы, romanized: Qazaqstan Kommunistık Halyq Partiasy, QKHP; Russian: Коммунистическая Народная партия Казахстана, romanized: Kommunisticheskaya Narodnaya partiya Kazakhstana, KNPK) on 13 April 2004. It was registered on 21 June 2004; the party had 90,000 members at the time of registration. Following the 2004 elections to the Mazhilis the party received 1.98% of total votes. In the 2007 elections to the Mazhilis the party won 1.29% of the votes and did not pass the electoral threshold. The QKHP was elected to parliament in the 2012 legislative election.

The party is loyal to incumbent president Kassym-Jomart Tokayev and is a part of the pro-Tokayev People's Coalition.

== History ==
Original logo of the party

The party emerged due to a split in the Communist Party of Kazakhstan (QKP). The idea to create a new party belongs to the 12 members of the Central Committee of Communist Party of Kazakhstan, who withdrew its membership because of the disagreements with the First Secretary of the QKP's Central Committee Serikbolsyn Abdildin. The reason for the split with the QKP was the election of a Secretary and a member of Mazhilis Tolen Tokhtassynov. About 15,000 members left QKP for QKHP. The founding congress QKHP took place in April 2004, on 21 June 2004 the party was registered with the Ministry of Justice of Kazakhstan.

Following the elections to Mazhilis in 2004, the party received 1.98% of total voters (proportional system) and did not pass into Parliament.

In the 2005 presidential elections, QKHP nominated Erasyl Abilqasymov as its candidate who received 0.34% of the votes.

On 28 March 2007 the QKHP and the QPK held a joint press conference at which they announced an impending merger. QKHP subsequently abandoned the association with the QPK because of the sharp political differences. At a press conference in June 2007, the First Secretary of QKHP Vladislav Kosarev named the fact that the Communist Party of Kazakhstan was considering associations with QKHP only at the highest level (Bureaus of Central Committee) as the main reason for refusing to merge, at the same time according to him consideration for such merger was not provided at local level. Kosarev said also that structures of QKP had been completely destroyed and the authority of the party among the people has been reduced to zero-level.

In elections to Mazhilis in 2007, the party won 1.29% of total votes and did not pass the electoral threshold to Parliament. In the 2012 election, the party won 7.19% of vote and 7 seats to become one of three parties to enter Parliament. Despite being officially in opposition, the party is considered as loyal to the regime and often votes with the government.

The 15th Communist People's Party of Kazakhstan Extraordinary Congress was held on 11 November 2020 in the capital Nur-Sultan. Delegates to the congress voted to rename the party the "People's Party of Kazakhstan" (QHP). Several changes were also made to the charters and programs of the party.

The Extraordinary Congress held a quorum of 33 delegates from the party. Every delegate voted in favour of the name change except Honorary Secretary Vladislav Kosarev. The party's parliamentary leader Aiqyn Qongyrov was unanimously chosen to be Chairman of the QHP, succeeding Kosarev who served as the QKHP's de facto leader since June 2013, while Jambyl Ahmetbekov, Turgyn Syzdyqov, Viktor Smirnov, and Gauhar Nugmanova were chosen to be Secretaries of the QHP.

In October 2022, the QHP joined the People's Coalition, in support of President Kassym-Jomart Tokayev, ceasing to be even nominally part of the opposition.

On an Almaty press conference of 1 July 2024, some members of the party demanded the resignation of Ermūhamet Ertısbaev from party chairmanship. The party infighting is said to come from the apparently "emerging personality cult" of Ertısbaev. Former deputy chairman, Ashat Asylbekov also claimed, that on one of the interviews that neared the 2023 Kazakh local elections, Ertısbaev stated that he'd be forever loyal to Nursultan Nazarbayev. These acts of Ertısbaev are said to be damaging to the party's reputation and Asylbekov, Almaty branch chairman Töleujan Jündibaev and Mangystau Region representative Abdraşit Niyaz publicly criticised the chairman and his deputy Miras Aukenov and demanded an "extraordinary" congress. Ertısbaev's large spendings on his "Ertisbaev live" YouTube channel and his public support for Quandyq Bishimbaev during his trial had also greatly damaged the party's reputation, Asylbekov says.

== Ideology ==
Originally a Marxist–Leninist party, the QHP presently advocates social democratic and progressive policies aimed at benefiting the working and middle classes. The party's platform also calls for a "people's capitalism".

== Structure ==
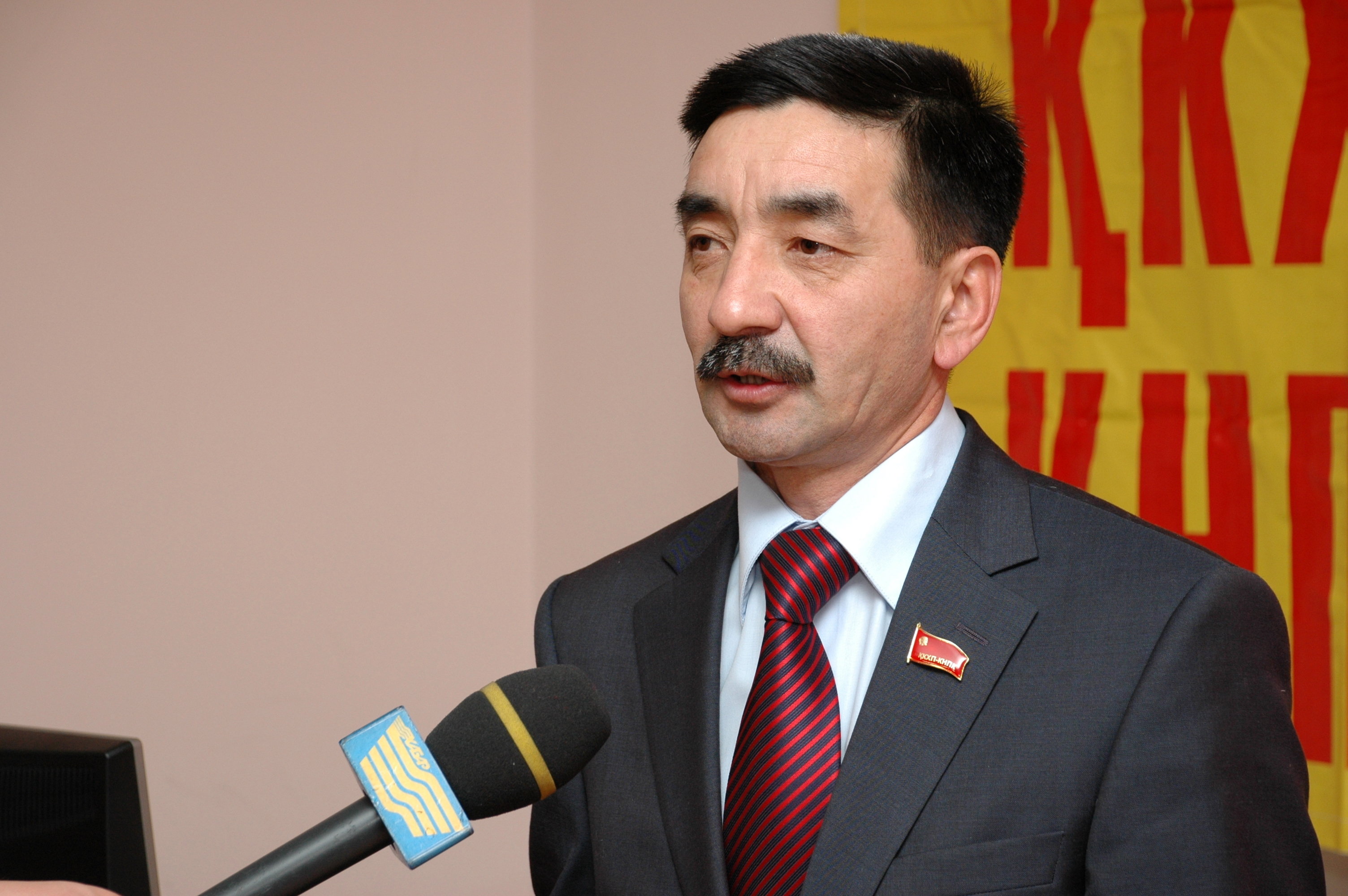
Secretary of the Central Committee Zhambyl Akhmetbekov

Membership for citizens of Kazakhstan aged from 18 in the QHP is voluntary, individual, fixed, confirmed with the party's ID.

The organizational structure of the QHP is based on the territorial principle. Organizational fundamentals of the party are primary party organizations that are created by three or more party members with decision of meeting which has to be approved by a regional or municipal party's committee. Branches and representations of the party represent party's policy to population, cooperate with state executive and representative bodies, political and social groups, have their own seal and letterhead.

As of July 2010, QHP has 1,868 primary party organizations, 178 district committees, 33 city committees and 14 regional committees as well as 2 city committees in the cities of national importance (Astana and Almaty).

The supreme body of QHP is the Congress convened by the Central Committee at least once in four years. The party's Central Committee organizes and coordinates the entire party's work. Central Committee's meetings (plenary sessions) shall be held at least once in six months.

Supervisory bodies of the party are the Central control-revision commission elected by the Congress of QHP, as well as regional, urban and regional control-revision commissions created in branches and offices of the party at party's conferences in conjunction with their governing bodies, control-revision commissions of primary party organizations elected at general meetings. The control-revision commission is accountable to highest authorities (party's Congress, conferences, branches and representative collections of primary organizations).

== Election results ==
=== Presidential elections ===
| Election | Candidate | Votes | % | Votes | % | Result |
| Election | Candidate | First round | | Second round | | Result |
|---|---|---|---|---|---|---|
| 2005 | Erasyl Abilqasymov | 23,252 | 0.34 | —N/a | | Lost |
| 2011 | Jambyl Ahmetbekov | 111,924 | 1.36 | —N/a | | Lost |
| 2015 | Turgyn Syzdyqov | 145,756 | 1.61 | —N/a | | Lost |
| 2019 | Jambyl Ahmetbekov | 167,649 | 1.82 | —N/a | | Lost |
| 2022 | Supported Kassym-Jomart Tokayev | 6,456,392 | 81.31 | —N/a | | Won |

=== Parliamentary elections ===
==== Majilis elections ====
| Election | Votes | % | Seats | +/– | Position | Result |
|---|---|---|---|---|---|---|
| 2004 | | 3.4% | 0 / 77 | New | ▲6th | Extra-parliamentary |
| 2007 | 76,799 | 1.3% | 0 / 98 | Steady | 6th | Extra-parliamentary |
| 2012 | 498,788 | 7.19% | 7 / 98 | ▲7 | ▲3rd | Opposition |
| 2016 | 537,123 | 7.14% | 7 / 98 | Steady | 3rd | Opposition |
| 2021 | 659,019 | 9.10% | 10 / 98 | ▲3 | 3rd | Opposition |
| 2023 | 432,920 | 6.80% | 5 / 98 | ▼5 | ▼5th | Opposition |

==== Kurultai elections ====
| Election | Leader | Votes | % | Seats | +/– | Position | Result |
|---|---|---|---|---|---|---|---|
| 2026 | Nursultan Shokanov | 285,395 | 3.19% | 0 / 145 | ▼0 | ▼6th | Extra-parliamentary |
