= 2007 Kazakh legislative election =

- 18 August 2007

98 of the 107 seats in the Mäjilis 54 seats needed for a majority
- Registered: 8,891,561
- Turnout: 68.4% (▼11.9pp)
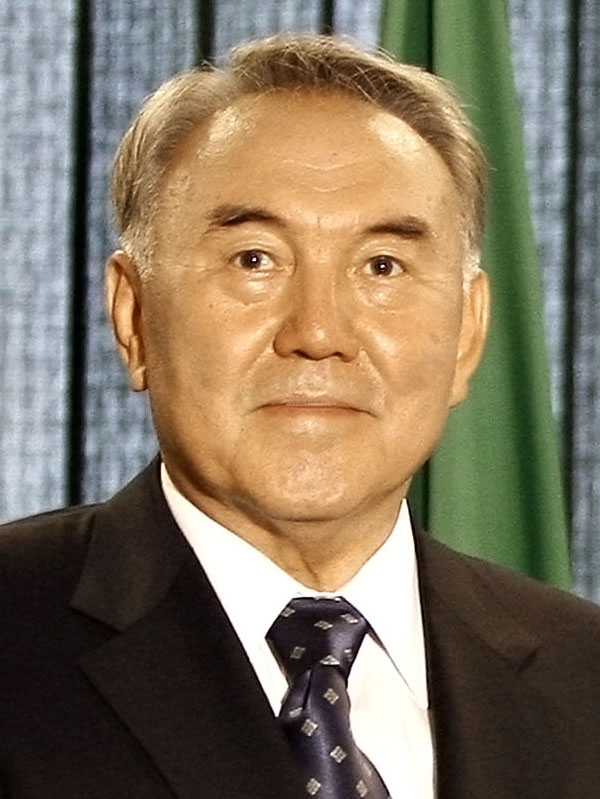

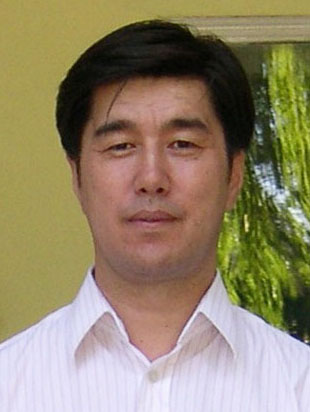
	Majority party	Minority party
Leader	Nursultan Nazarbayev	Alikhan Baimenov
Party	Nur Otan	Aq Jol
Leader since	1 March 1999	13 March 2005
Last election	57 seats (Note: In the 2004 elections, Otan won 42 seats, an alliance of the Agrarian Party and Civic Party won 11 seats and Asar won four seats. The parties merged to form Nur Otan in 2006.)	1 seat
Seats won	98	0
Seat change	▲41	▼1
Popular vote	5,247,720	183,346
Percentage	88.4%	3.1%
Chairman before election
Oral Muhamedjanov
Nur Otan
Elected Chairman
Aslan Musin
Nur Otan

Legislative elections were held in Kazakhstan on 18 August 2007 to elected. President Nursultan Nazarbayev's ruling Nur Otan party received 88% of the vote and won all of the available seats (excluding the reserved 9-seat quota for the Assembly of People of Kazakhstan), as none of the six other parties contesting the election had managed to pass the 7% electoral threshold to win seats.

== Background ==
On 19 June 2007 50 of the 77 deputies of the Mäjilis voted to request President Nursultan Nazarbayev for the legislature to be dissolved after a ruling by the Constitutional Council from 18 June that the Mäjilis can dissolve itself only with the permission of the president despite the Kazakh Constitution allowing the parliament to do so in a motion of no confidence. Nazarbayev accepted the request that same day and the Mäjilis was officially dissolved on 20 June. The move was criticized by several prominent opposition activists such as the chairman of Nationwide Social Democratic Party, Zharmakhan Tuyakbay, who claimed that the a snap election gave little time to prepare for the polling day.

== Electoral system ==
A total of 107 seats were at stake in the Majilis, an increase of 30, following constitutional amendments earlier in the year. Under the changes, 98 deputies were elected by party lists, an increase from just 10 in the previous parliament. The remaining nine seats were reserved for members elected by the Assembly of People of Kazakhstan.

== Conduct ==
The opposition Nationwide Social Democratic Party, which received almost 5% of the vote, denounced the election, and the Organization for Security and Co-operation in Europe observers said the election showed some progress, but was also marred by problems, saying that "in over 40 percent of the polling stations visited, [vote counting] was described as bad or very bad", which was worse than in the last parliamentary and presidential elections. Bias in the state media was also considered a problem.

== Results ==
Party	Votes	%	Seats	+/–
Nur Otan	5,247,720	88.41	98	+41 (Note: In the 2004 elections, Otan won 42 seats, an alliance of the Agrarian Party and Civic Party won 11 seats and Asar won four seats. The parties merged to form Nur Otan in 2006.)
Nationwide Social Democratic Party	269,310	4.54	0	New
Aq Jol	183,346	3.09	0	–1
Auyl Kazakh Social Democratic Party	89,855	1.51	0	0
Communist People's Party	76,799	1.29	0	0
Party of Patriots	46,436	0.78	0	0
Rukhaniyat Party	22,159	0.37	0	0
Members elected by the Assembly of People			9	New
Total	5,935,625	100.00	107	+30
Valid votes	5,935,625	97.59		
Invalid/blank votes	146,805	2.41		
Total votes	6,082,430	100.00		
Registered voters/turnout	8,891,561	68.41		
Source: Adam Carr, IPU
