= 2012 Kazakh legislative election =

- 15 January 2012

98 of the 107 seats in the Mäjilis 54 seats needed for a majority
- Registered: 9,303,693
- Turnout: 75.44% (▲7.04pp)
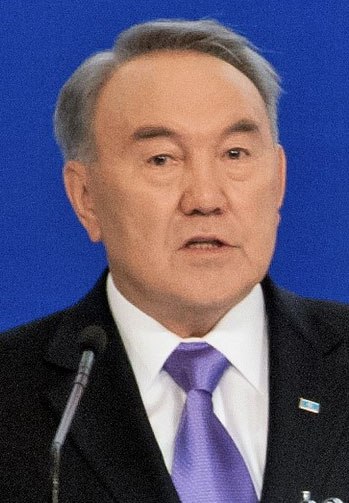

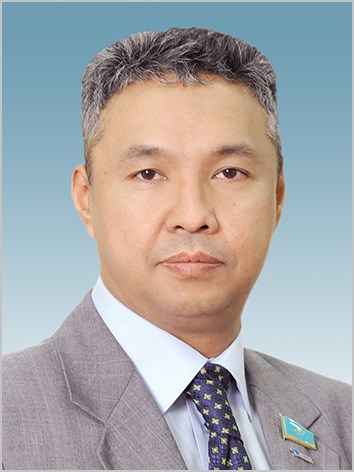

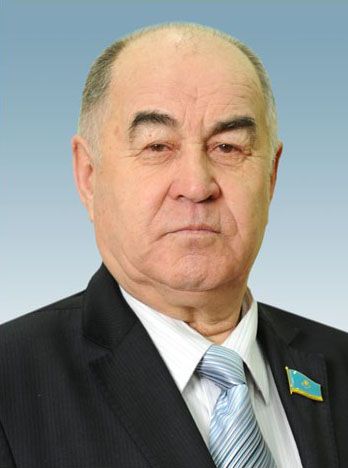
	Majority party	Minority party	Third party
Leader	Nursultan Nazarbayev	Azat Peruashev	Vladislav Kosarev
Party	Nur Otan	Ak Zhol	QKHP
Leader since	1 March 1999	2 July 2011	6 June 2004
Last election	98	-	-
Seats won	83	8	7
Seat change	▼15	▲8	▲7
Popular vote	5,621,436	518,405	498,788
Percentage	80.99%	7.47%	7.19%
Swing	▼7.41%	▲4.37%	▲5.89%
Chairman before election
Oral Muhamedjanov
Nur Otan
Elected Chairman
Nurlan Nigmatulin
Nur Otan

Legislative elections were held in Kazakhstan on 15 January 2012. The result was a victory for the Nur Otan party, which won 83 of the 98 seats in the Mäjilis. However, the Organization for Security and Co-operation in Europe (OSCE) stated that the election "did not meet fundamental principles of democratic elections." The elections marked the first time that the second-placed party would gain parliamentary seats irrespective of whether it cleared the 7% electoral threshold. Due to the Zhanaozen massacre and the resulting state of emergency there, the election was not planned to be held in Zhanaozen. However, this decision was overturned on 10 January 2012.

== Background ==
In the 2007 Kazakh legislative elections, the pro-presidential party Nur Otan won all the 98 contested seats in the Mazhilis, which eliminated any form of opposition, bringing the Parliament under a single-party control. This received criticism and pressure from international and opposition groups in the country. In an interview to Reuters, Prime Minister of Kazakhstan Karim Massimov expressed his support of having opposition in the Parliament as in a way of that the democratic reforms match an economic growth. Following President Nursultan Nazarbayev's reelection in the 2011 presidential election, he announced the promise of bringing a "new era of democratic reforms." Nazarbayev's advisor Ermukhamet Ertysbayev stated that the next Mazhilis convocation have a two-party system in which he used comparison with the United States and United Kingdom as an example. Opposition activist Vladimir Kozlov criticized the move, saying that the authorities would not let real opposition groups enter the Parliament.

=== Dissolution of the 4th Mäjilis ===
On 9 November 2011 Ermukhamet Ertysbayev, in an interview with the Vremya newspaper, expressed his opinion that “theoretically, it can be assumed” that the Mäjilis deputies at the plenary come up with an initiative to dissolve the Parliament. At the same time, Ertysbayev said that “Kazakhstan should enter the third decade of independence with at least a two-party Parliament." That same day, Mäjilis Chair Oral Muhamedjanov dismissed claims of the Parliament's dissolution as rumors. At the same time, a number of deputies said that they expected the issue of self-dissolution to be raised.

The following day on 10 November, members of the Mäjilis Nurtai Sabilianov and Viktor Rogalev announced to the media representatives an appeal to Nursultan Nazarbayev with a request to adopt a decree on the dissolution of the 5th Mäjilis and mäslihats. 53 Mäjilis deputies signed the appeal. The proposal was substantiated by several reasons: the expectation of a second wave of the global financial and economic crisis in 2012 and the expediency of focusing on overcoming a possible crisis, without being distracted by the electoral cycle, and the need to form a Parliament of at least two political parties.

On 16 November 2011 the President Nursultan Nazarbayev signed a decree "On the dissolution of the Mäjilis of the Parliament of the Republic of Kazakhstan of the fourth convocation and the appointment of early elections of deputies of the Mäjilis of the Parliament of the Republic of Kazakhstan", according to which the Mäjilis was dissolved, and the elections of deputies elected by party lists were scheduled for 15 January 2012, and the deputies elected from the Assembly of People of Kazakhstan for January 16. This dissolution of Parliament was marked as the 4th time since Kazakhstan's independence in 1991.

== Electoral system ==
The 98 directly-elected deputies of the Mäjilis were elected from a single nationwide constituency by proportional representation with a 7% electoral threshold. Seats were allocated using the largest remainder method. If parties had an equal largest remainder, the party that was registered first was awarded the seat. If only one party crossed the threshold, the party with the second highest number of votes was to be awarded at least two seats. A further nine seats were elected by the Assembly of People, a body selected by the President.

== Results ==
Party	Votes	%	Seats	+/–
Nur Otan	5,621,436	80.99	83	–15
Aq Jol	518,405	7.47	8	+8
Communist People's Party	498,788	7.19	7	+7
Nationwide Social Democratic Party	116,534	1.68	0	0
Auyl Kazakh Social Democratic Party	82,623	1.19	0	0
Party of Patriots	57,732	0.83	0	0
Democratic Party Adilet	45,702	0.66	0	New
Members elected by the Assembly of People			9	0
Total	6,941,220	100.00	107	0
Valid votes	6,941,220	98.89		
Invalid/blank votes	77,707	1.11		
Total votes	7,018,927	100.00		
Registered voters/turnout	9,303,693	75.44		
Source: Psephos

The nine nominees were: Sauytbek Abdrahmov, Vladimir Bozhko, Natalya Zhumadildayeva, Roman Kim, Narine Mikaelyan, Ahmet Muradov, Shaimardan Nurumov, Yury Tymochenko and Shakir Khakhazov.

== Reactions ==
The opposition claimed there was widespread irregularities and fraud. The OSCE and US Department of State did not recognise the elections as democratic.

Miklos Haraszti, the head of the OSCE's long-term election-observation mission, criticized what he called a "tightly controlled campaign environment in which the electoral rights of the citizens were seriously limited." "There was limited public debate and the media, the mass media operates in an environment characterized by self-censorship and in which there is no room for editorial independence in the broadcast media." Haraszti said the "results of the election, including the presence of two parties apart from the state party, can be described as an orchestrated election."
