= 2016 Kazakh legislative election =

- 20 March 2016

98 of the 107 seats in the Mäjilis 54 seats needed for a majority
- Registered: 9,810,852
- Turnout: 77.12% (▲1.68pp)
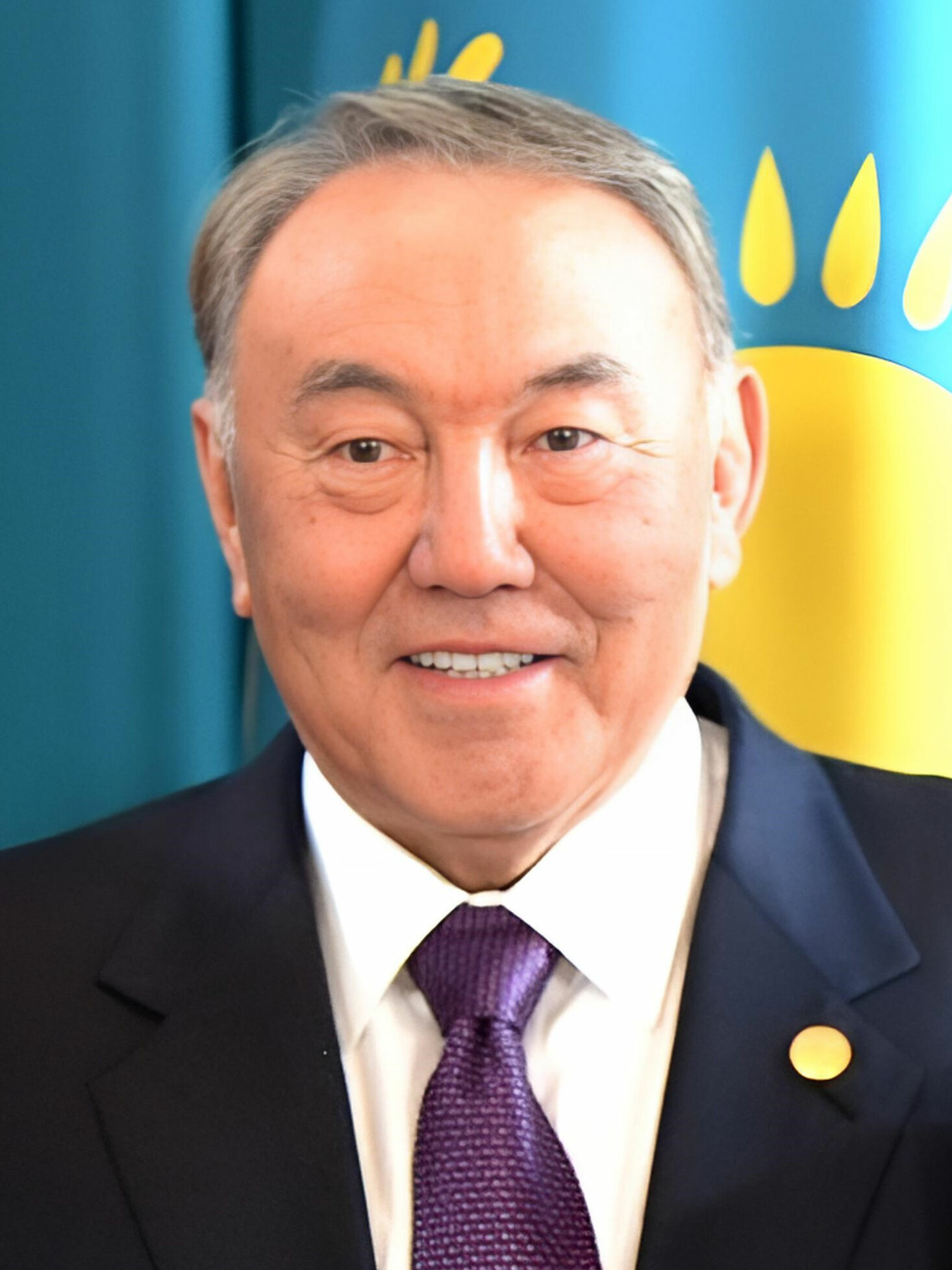

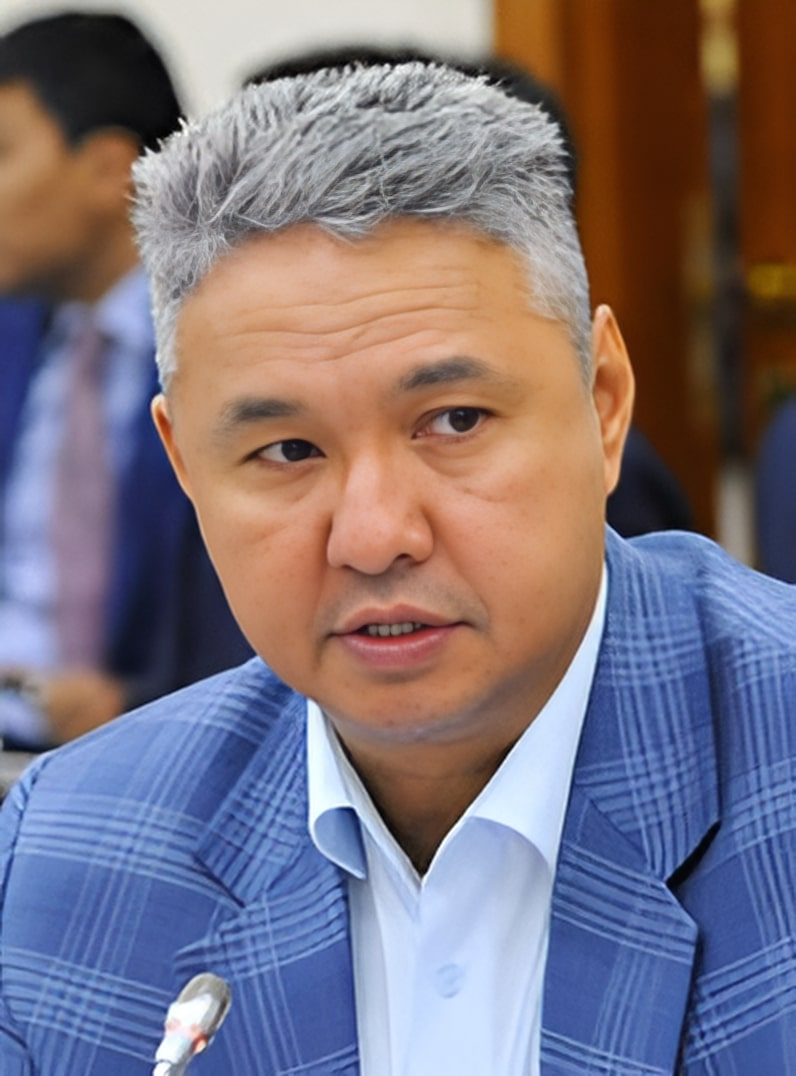

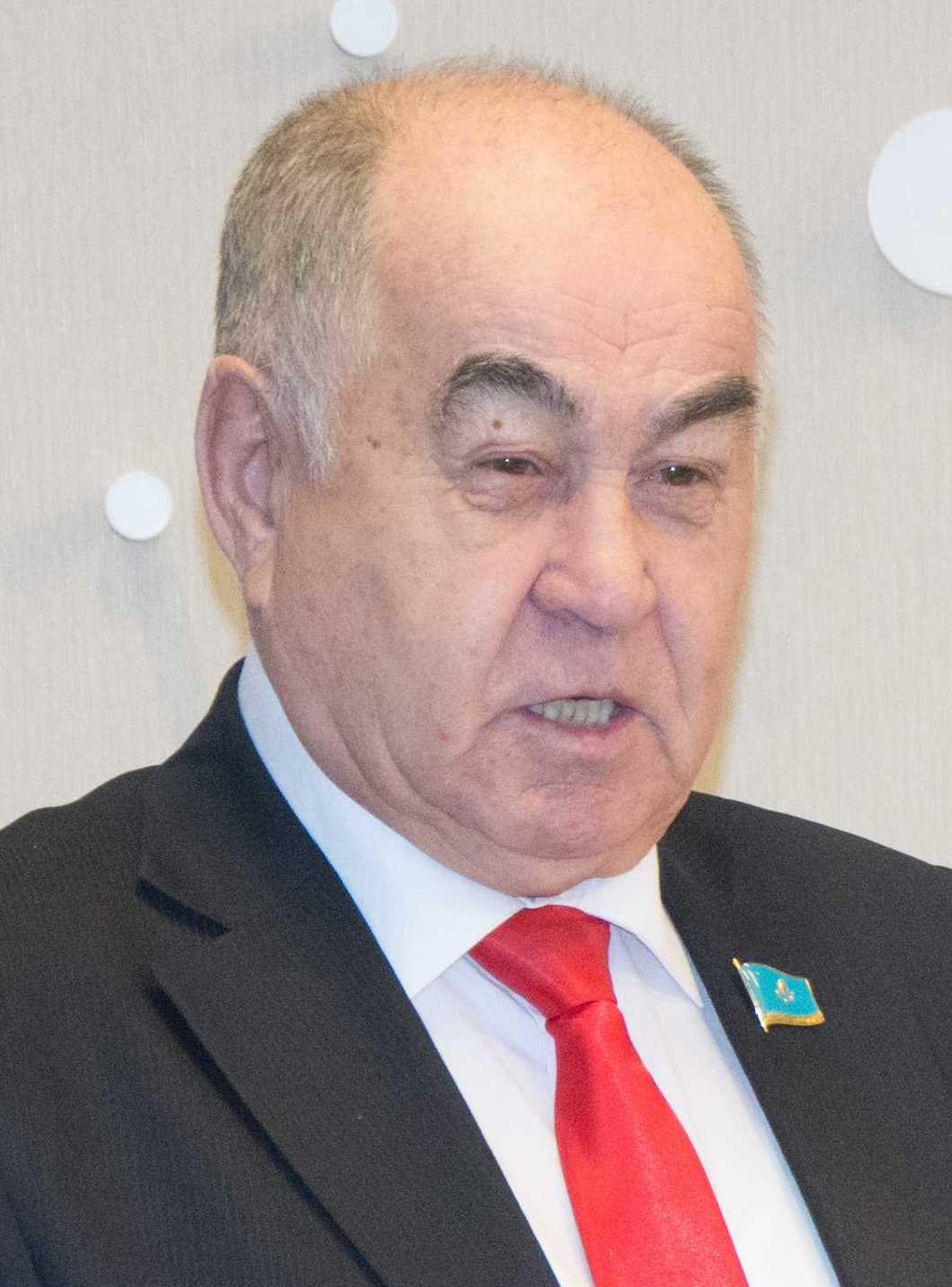
	Majority party	Minority party	Third party
Leader	Nursultan Nazarbayev	Azat Peruashev	Vladislav Kosarev
Party	Nur Otan	Aq Jol	QKHP
Leader since	1 March 1999	2 July 2011	6 June 2004
Last election	83	8	7
Seats won	84	7	7
Seat change	▲1	▼1	Steady
Popular vote	6,183,757	540,406	537,123
Percentage	82.20%	7.18%	7.14%
Swing	▲1.21pp	▼0.29pp	▼0.05pp
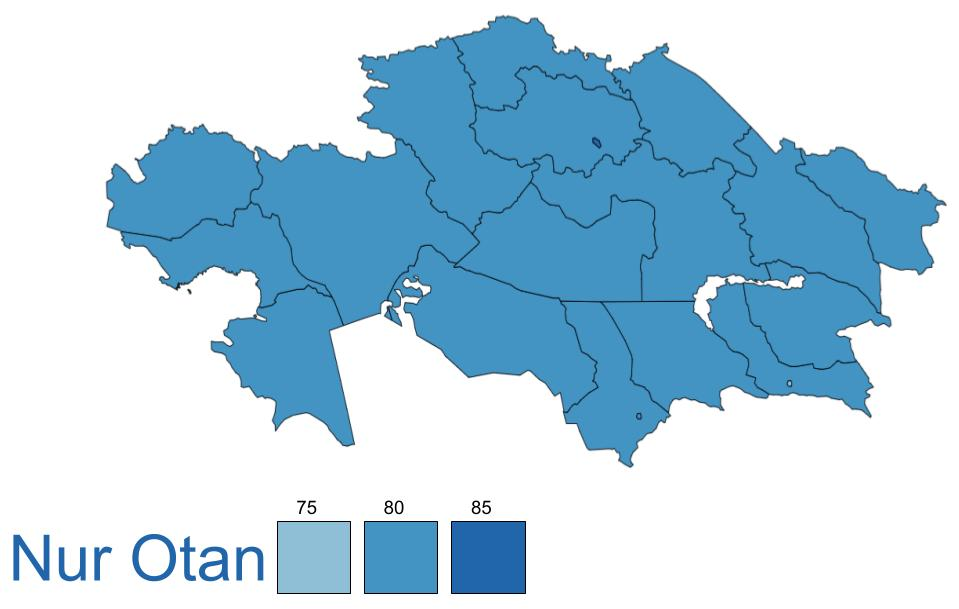
Chairman before election
Kabibulla Dzhakupov
Nur Otan
Elected Chairman
Baktykozha Izmukhambetov
Nur Otan

Legislative elections were held in Kazakhstan on 20 March 2016. The date was set by president Nursultan Nazarbayev on 20 January 2016, when he dissolved the Mäjilis after it had requested dissolution on 13 January, with the reason cited being the economic crisis caused by low oil prices. The term of the Mäjilis would have expired in the fall of 2016.

The result was an expected victory for Nur Otan from the exit polls which won an extra seat while the Ak Zhol Democratic Party and Communist People's Party of Kazakhstan maintained their presence in the Mäjilis. The Organization for Security and Co-operation in Europe (OSCE) complained about lack of "genuine political choice" and "pluralism of opinion in the media."

== Background ==
From 2014, Kazakhstan had experienced economic crisis as a result of oil price crash in which it is heavily reliant on for revenue and the devaluation of the Kazakhstani tenge that was caused by the country's neighboring and main trading partner of Russia which faced a financial crisis as a result of international sanctions over the annexation of Crimea by the Russian Federation and War in Donbas.

In the 2015 Kazakh presidential election, President Nursultan Nazarbayev won 97.7% of the vote with lack of any opposition candidates. From there, he announced that the Nurly Zhol economic stimulus would remain as top priority in dealing with the economic troubles and that the sanctions against Russia could not stay forever, believing that the Russo-Ukrainian war would eventually end in peace. Despite the promises, the price of oil continued dropping and Kazakhstan's exports shrank by 40%. In August 2015, the tenge lost 5% of its value against dollar. Chairman of the National Bank of Kazakhstan Kairat Kelimbetov dismissed the claims of currency devaluation saying that "this is a transition to a freely floating rate when the market itself determines a balanced exchange rate on the basis of supply and demand." The inflation rate though did drop by 3.7% from the beginning of the year because of low oil prices and weak domestic demand. By October 2015, the tenge devalued by 40% and the inflation rate eventually rose again by 13% at the end of the year.

On 13 January 2016 members of the Mäjilis voted unanimously to request Nazarbayev dissolve parliament. The reason was Nazarbayev's warning about a potential upcoming "real crisis" that would be caused by low oil prices. One week later, Nazarbayev set 20 March 2016 as the date for the snap elections, which would be held concurrently with elections to mäslihats (local legislative bodies).

== Electoral system ==
The 98 directly elected members of the Mäjilis were elected from a single nationwide constituency by proportional representation with a 7% electoral threshold. Seats were allocated using the largest remainder method. If parties had an equal largest remainder, the party that was registered first was awarded the seat. If only one party crossed the threshold, the party with the second highest number of votes was to be awarded at least two seats. A further nine seats were elected by the Assembly of People, a body selected by the President.

== Parties ==
The table shows the parties that appeared on the ballot:

Ballot #	Party	Main ideology	Leader
1	Nur Otan	Big tent	Nursultan Nazarbayev
2	Communist People's Party of Kazakhstan	Communism	Vladislav Kosarev
3	Ak Zhol Democratic Party	Liberal conservatism	Azat Peruashev
4	Birlik	Eco-socialism	Serik Sultangali
5	Nationwide Social Democratic Party	Social democracy	Zharmakhan Tuyakbay
6	Kazakhstani Social Democratic Party Auyl	Agrarianism	Äli Bektaev

== Campaign ==
=== Nur Otan ===
Nur Otan party secretary Farhad Quanganov in an interview to Vlast.kz said that "all the necessary organizational and preparatory work has already begun." He called the parliamentary elections "a historic opportunity to become even stronger, even more united, to ensure the effective implementation of five institutional reforms and the Plan of the Nation '100 Concrete Steps'."

==== 17th Extraordinary Congress ====
The party held its 17th Extraordinary Congress at the Palace of Independence in Astana on 29 January 2016. Nur Otan presented its electoral program named "Kazakhstan 2021: Unity, Stability, Creation" which noted its achievements in economic growth of 7%, GDP growth per-capita by 17 times, the creation of the National Fund which accumulated over $63.5 billion over 17 years, first industrial programs, Kazakhstan's entry into the top 10 world exporters in grain, and an increase in population by 3 million. President and party chairman Nursultan Nazarbayev assured Kazakhstani citizens that nothing produced in the country should rise, mentioning his personal visit to the markets in Astana where he did not notice much rise in price, except for seasonal cucumbers and tomatoes which Nazarbayev claimed to be due to winter season. The Nur Otan presented its party list of 127 candidates which included well-known politicians, public figures, athletes and artists in the country.

=== Ak Zhol ===
On 3 February 2016, the Ak Zhol Democratic Party held its 8th Ordinary Congress where the party unveiled its list of 35 people. Ak Zhol Chairman Azat Peruashev at the congress said "we are not opposition to our people, our state, our President, for whom we voted. We are the opposition to injustice, incompetence, dishonesty." The party members approved a manifesto called "Ak Zhol - Time to Work", which consisted of ten points: protection of business and giving mass character to entrepreneurship; market reforms and the creation of a productive economy; an educated and healthy nation - strong and ambitious workforce; development of the employment system and reduction of unemployment; housing construction as a driver of the economy; the agro-industrial complex is a reliable support of the country; transparency and accountability of the authorities to the society; development of the spiritual and cultural sphere of the people of Kazakhstan; fight against corruption and judicial and legal reform; security for every home. The Ak Zhol expressed its desire to win at least seven seats in the Mäjilis.

=== Communist People's Party ===
The Communist People's Party of Kazakhstan (QKHP) at its 10th Ordinary Congress on 2 February 2016 announced its party list consisting of 22 people, which included 2015 presidential election candidate Turgyn Syzdyqov. The party announced its intention to preserve the ideas of scientific communism, promote the ideology of Marxism–Leninism in the country and strategic priorities of the implemented social policy of the state to improve the quality of life for citizens. The QKHP urged all the proletarians in Kazakhstan to unite and expressed its support to fight prostitution, drug addiction and embezzlement. The party also proposed a ban on Hollywood blockbusters, believing it to be corrupting Kazakhstani youth.

=== Auyl ===
The Auyl People's Democratic Patriotic Party presented its party list of 19 candidates at its 12th Extraordinary Congress on 1 February 2016, which according to the party's chairman Äli Bektaev, 70% of them worked in production, were heads of districts and cities while some of them were heads of ministries, agencies and first deputies. The Auyl announced its electoral platform in preservation and development of the national culture, development in rural areas through the introduction of modern technologies in the agricultural sector, tight control over the targeted and rational use of agricultural land, reduction in wage gap, establishment of "luxury tax" and the increased quality standards for medical services in the villages, payment towards spouses with 3 or more children, and an increase in scholarships to the level of the social standard of consumption.

=== JSDP ===
The opposition Nationwide Social Democratic Party (JSDP) was the first contesting party to hold its election campaign congress on 31 January 2016. From there, the party presented its list of 27 people from which JSDP Chairman Zharmakhan Tuyakbay stated that "there are a lot of organizational problems, in general, I tried to dodge this party list." Although he expressed doubts about running for seat in the Mäjilis, Tuyakbay noted that with him, the party list would count as 28 candidates. The JSDP adopted an anti-crisis platform titled "Get your voice back, get your country back!" which called to an end in the decline in the living standards of citizens, stopping the collapse of the tenge, transformation of an authoritarian regime to a democratic form of government, and an ensuring of the environmental safety by proposing a ban on the import and disposal of foreign nuclear and other hazardous waste on the territory of Kazakhstan. The party criticized the government's response to the crisis and sought for the expansion of production and consumption.

=== Birlik ===
On 5 February 2016, the Birlik announced its participation in the elections for the first time since the party's foundation in 2013. The Birlik positioned itself as a "party of social justice" which seeks to protect an individual from lawlessness by creating equal opportunities for all citizens regardless of social, ethnic and religious backgrounds. The party announced its decision to prioritize the issues of environmental protection with a goal of establishing a clean Kazakhstan by preserving flora and fauna. The Birlik called for reforms in aimed at creating a more competitive economy and agriculture and an increase in state-defined consumer basket. According to the party's chairman Serik Sultangali, the policies made by Birlik supports the strategic guidelines that were implemented by President Nursultan Nazarbayev.

== Conduct ==
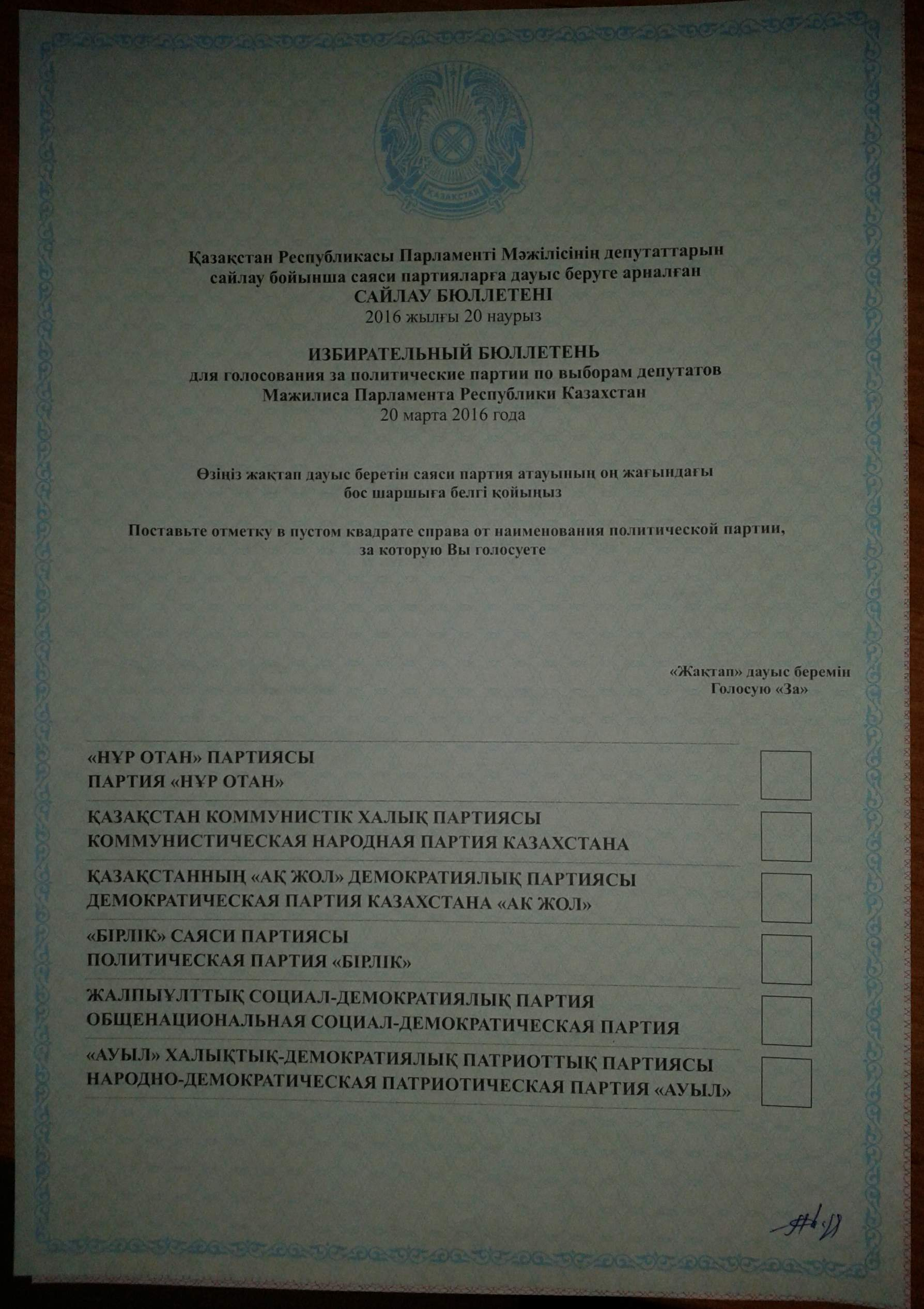
2016 Kazakhstani legislative election ballot.

Observers from the Organization for Security and Co-operation in Europe's Office for Democratic Institutions and Human Rights (OSCE/ODIHR), the OSCE Parliamentary Assembly (PA) and the Parliamentary Assembly of the Council of Europe (PACE) announced in their joint press release that the elections had been "efficiently organised with some progress noted, but they indicated that Kazakhstan still has a considerable way to go in meeting its OSCE commitments for democratic elections". The statement added: "The legal framework restricts fundamental civil and political rights, and comprehensive reform is required."

== Results ==
Party	Votes	%	Seats	+/–
Nur Otan	6,183,757	82.20	84	+1
Aq Jol	540,406	7.18	7	–1
Communist People's Party	537,123	7.14	7	0
Auyl People's Democratic Patriotic Party	151,285	2.01	0	0
Nationwide Social Democratic Party	88,813	1.18	0	0
Birlik	21,484	0.29	0	New
Members elected by the Assembly of People			9	0
Total	7,522,868	100.00	107	0
Valid votes	7,522,868	99.43		
Invalid/blank votes	43,282	0.57		
Total votes	7,566,150	100.00		
Registered voters/turnout	9,810,852	77.12		
Source: CEC, CEC

The nine nominees were Sauytbek Abdrahmov, Vladimir Bozhko, Natalya Zhumadildayeva, Roman Kim, Narine Mikaelyan, Ahmet Muradov, Shaimardan Nurumov, Yury Tymochenko and Shakir Khakhazov.

=== By region ===
==== Akmola Region ====

Party	Votes	%
Nur Otan	311,788	82.52
Democratic Party of Kazakhstan Ak Zhol	24,604	6.51
Communist People's Party of Kazakhstan	28,489	7.54
Kazakhstani Social Democratic Party Auyl	11,335	3.00
Nationwide Social Democratic Party	1,327	0.35
Birlik	303	0.08
Invalid/blank votes		–
Total		
Registered voters/turnout		
Source: CEC, CEC

==== Aktobe Region ====

Party	Votes	%
Nur Otan	318,205	83.63
Democratic Party of Kazakhstan Ak Zhol	31,577	8.30
Communist People's Party of Kazakhstan	25,671	6.77
Kazakhstani Social Democratic Party Auyl	11,335	3.00
Nationwide Social Democratic Party	2,004	0.53
Birlik	855	0.23
Invalid/blank votes		–
Total		
Registered voters/turnout		
Source: CEC, CEC

==== Almaty Region ====

Party	Votes	%
Nur Otan	789,394	84.78
Democratic Party of Kazakhstan Ak Zhol	60,112	6.46
Communist People's Party of Kazakhstan	57,784	6.21
Kazakhstani Social Democratic Party Auyl	11,335	3.00
Nationwide Social Democratic Party	1,025	0.11
Birlik	600	0.06
Invalid/blank votes		–
Total		
Registered voters/turnout		
Source: CEC, CEC

==== Atyrau Region ====

Party	Votes	%
Nur Otan	214,792	84.74
Democratic Party of Kazakhstan Ak Zhol	18,372	7.25
Communist People's Party of Kazakhstan	17,840	7.04
Kazakhstani Social Democratic Party Auyl	453	0.18
Nationwide Social Democratic Party	736	0.29
Birlik	1,265	0.06
Invalid/blank votes		–
Total		
Registered voters/turnout		
Source: CEC, CEC

==== East Kazakhstan Region ====

Party	Votes	%
Nur Otan	585,331	82.17
Democratic Party of Kazakhstan Ak Zhol	51,524	7.23
Communist People's Party of Kazakhstan	60,649	8.51
Kazakhstani Social Democratic Party Auyl	8,209	1.15
Nationwide Social Democratic Party	4,595	0.65
Birlik	2,075	0.29
Invalid/blank votes		–
Total		
Registered voters/turnout		
Source: CEC, CEC

==== Jambyl Region ====

Party	Votes	%
Nur Otan	346,338	80.32
Democratic Party of Kazakhstan Ak Zhol	33,994	7.88
Communist People's Party of Kazakhstan	36,996	8.58
Kazakhstani Social Democratic Party Auyl	6,840	1.59
Nationwide Social Democratic Party	4,659	1.08
Birlik	2,384	0.55
Invalid/blank votes		–
Total		
Registered voters/turnout		
Source: CEC, CEC

==== West Kazakhstan Region ====

Party	Votes	%
Nur Otan	258,809	82.68
Democratic Party of Kazakhstan Ak Zhol	24,145	7.71
Communist People's Party of Kazakhstan	16,992	5.41
Kazakhstani Social Democratic Party Auyl	6,199	1.98
Nationwide Social Democratic Party	4,160	1.33
Birlik	2,781	0.89
Invalid/blank votes		–
Total		
Registered voters/turnout		
Source: CEC, CEC

==== Karaganda Region ====

Party	Votes	%
Nur Otan	548,864	83.20
Democratic Party of Kazakhstan Ak Zhol	50,599	7.67
Communist People's Party of Kazakhstan	50,071	7.59
Kazakhstani Social Democratic Party Auyl	8,642	1.31
Nationwide Social Democratic Party	1,188	0.18
Birlik	330	0.05
Invalid/blank votes		–
Total		
Registered voters/turnout		
Source: CEC, CEC

==== Kostanay Region ====

Party	Votes	%
Nur Otan	379,250	81.59
Democratic Party of Kazakhstan Ak Zhol	34,802	7.49
Communist People's Party of Kazakhstan	38,831	8.35
Kazakhstani Social Democratic Party Auyl	9,522	2.05
Nationwide Social Democratic Party	1,858	0.40
Birlik	560	0.12
Invalid/blank votes		–
Total		
Registered voters/turnout		
Source: CEC, CEC

==== Kyzylorda Region ====

Party	Votes	%
Nur Otan	273,870	81.41
Democratic Party of Kazakhstan Ak Zhol	24,093	7.25
Communist People's Party of Kazakhstan	20,406	6.14
Kazakhstani Social Democratic Party Auyl	8,537	2.57
Nationwide Social Democratic Party	4,586	1.38
Birlik	831	0.25
Invalid/blank votes		–
Total		
Registered voters/turnout		
Source: CEC, CEC

==== Mangystau Region ====

Party	Votes	%
Nur Otan	197,246	82.07
Democratic Party of Kazakhstan Ak Zhol	15,287	6.36
Communist People's Party of Kazakhstan	14,445	6.01
Kazakhstani Social Democratic Party Auyl	9,349	3.89
Nationwide Social Democratic Party	2,763	1.15
Birlik	1,249	0.52
Invalid/blank votes		–
Total		
Registered voters/turnout		
Source: CEC, CEC

==== Pavlodar Region ====

Party	Votes	%
Nur Otan	271,961	81.72
Democratic Party of Kazakhstan Ak Zhol	23,925	7.20
Communist People's Party of Kazakhstan	27,362	8.23
Kazakhstani Social Democratic Party Auyl	4,633	1.39
Nationwide Social Democratic Party	3,363	1.01
Birlik	1,508	0.45
Invalid/blank votes		–
Total		
Registered voters/turnout		
Source: CEC, CEC

==== North Kazakhstan Region ====

Party	Votes	%
Nur Otan	261,903	82.72
Democratic Party of Kazakhstan Ak Zhol	21,685	6.85
Communist People's Party of Kazakhstan	21,622	6.83
Kazakhstani Social Democratic Party Auyl	9,568	3.02
Nationwide Social Democratic Party	1,521	0.48
Birlik	315	0.10
Invalid/blank votes		–
Total		
Registered voters/turnout		
Source: CEC, CEC

==== South Kazakhstan Region ====

Party	Votes	%
Nur Otan	918,245	82.07
Democratic Party of Kazakhstan Ak Zhol	78,879	7.05
Communist People's Party of Kazakhstan	73,287	6.55
Kazakhstani Social Democratic Party Auyl	33,529	3.00
Nationwide Social Democratic Party	13,693	1.22
Birlik	1.223	0.11
Invalid/blank votes		–
Total		
Registered voters/turnout		
Source: CEC, CEC

==== City of Astana ====

Party	Votes	%
Nur Otan	263,051	85.18
Democratic Party of Kazakhstan Ak Zhol	16,055	5.20
Communist People's Party of Kazakhstan	21,471	7.04
Kazakhstani Social Democratic Party Auyl	495	0.16
Nationwide Social Democratic Party	6,423	2.08
Birlik	1,051	0.34
Invalid/blank votes		–
Total		
Registered voters/turnout		
Source: CEC, CEC

==== City of Almaty ====

Party	Votes	%
Nur Otan	244,980	70.10
Democratic Party of Kazakhstan Ak Zhol	30,753	8.80
Communist People's Party of Kazakhstan	24,917	7.13
Kazakhstani Social Democratic Party Auyl	9,786	2.80
Nationwide Social Democratic Party	34,912	9.99
Birlik	4,124	1.18
Invalid/blank votes		–
Total		
Registered voters/turnout		
Source: CEC, CEC
