= Parliament of Kazakhstan =

Former bicameral legislature of Kazakhstan

Parliament of the Republic of Kazakhstan: Қазақстан Республикасының Парламенті (Kazakh); Парламент Республики Казахстан (Russian)
- Emblem of Kazakhstan

Type
- Type: Bicameral
- Houses: Senate (upper); Mäjilis (lower)

History
- Founded: 16 October 1995
- Disbanded: 1 July 2026
- Preceded by: Supreme Council
- Succeeded by: Kurultai

Leadership
- Chairman of the Senate (Last): Mäulen Äşimbaev, Amanat
- Chairman of the Mäjilis (Last): Erlan Qoşanov, Amanat
- Seats: Senate: 49 (34 elected and 15 appointment by the president); Mäjilis: 98

Elections
- Senate voting system: Indirectly elected by regional legislatures Appointment by the President and Assembly of People of Kazakhstan
- Mäjilis voting system: Mixed-member majoritarian representation
- First Mäjilis election: 9 December 1995
- Last Senate election: 14 January 2023
- Last Mäjilis election: 19 March 2023

Meeting place
- House of the Parliament, Astana

Website
- quryltai.kz/en/home

The Parliament of the Republic of Kazakhstan (Note: Kazakh: Қазақстан Республикасының Парламенті, romanized: Qazaqstan Respublikasynyñ Parlamentı; Russian: Парламент Республики Казахстан, romanized: Parlament Respubliki Kazahstan) was the bicameral legislature of Kazakhstan, consisting of the upper house, the Senate, and the lower house, the Mäjilis. Both chambers conducted legislative sessions at the Parliament House in the capital of Astana.

The Mäjilis, the lower house, had 98 seats. Members were elected for five-year terms through a mixed-member majoritarian representation system. The Mäjilis played a role in Kazakhstan’s legislative process, responsible for passing laws, approving the national budget, ratifying international treaties, and overseeing the executive branch. It also held power in confirming key government appointments, such as the Prime Minister and cabinet members.

The Senate, the upper house, consisted of 50 deputies who were appointed either by local legislative bodies (mäslihats), the President, or the Assembly of People of Kazakhstan for six-year terms. The Senate's responsibilities included reviewing and approving laws passed by the Mäjilis, confirming presidential appointments to the judiciary and executive branches, and approving key presidential decrees, particularly those related to military force or the declaration of a state of emergency. The Senate also represented regional interests of Kazakhstan, providing a more localized perspective in the national legislative process.

The Parliament of Kazakhstan was established under the 1995 Constitution of Kazakhstan, following the dissolution of the Supreme Council. The bicameral system marked a shift from the previous unicameral legislature. Over time, the Parliament has evolved to play a key role in shaping the legislative framework of Kazakhstan, contributing to the development of national policies and governance, and ensuring checks and balances within the political system.

== History ==
Kazakhstan’s parliament replaced the unicameral Supreme Soviet, a representative body first established in 1938 under the 1937 Constitution of the Kazakh SSR, and subsequently formed based on the 1978 Constitution of the Kazakh SSR and the 1993 Constitution of the Republic of Kazakhstan. Throughout its history, the Supreme Soviet was elected 13 times.

In the early 1990s, disagreements emerged between President Nursultan Nazarbayev and members of the Supreme Soviet. Most deputies at the time served on a part-time basis, balancing their duties with regular jobs, while the president advocated for a fully professional parliament. Deputies of the 12th Supreme Soviet often made decisions without secured funding, approving expenditures that exceeded the budget. This ultimately led to a significant backlog of unpaid social benefits.

One of the key tasks of the 12th Supreme Soviet was to adopt the first constitution of an independent Kazakhstan. The parliamentary debates were intense. The president’s proposal to create a bicameral parliament and the article allowing for the dissolution of parliament were not approved. On January 28, 1993, the Supreme Soviet adopted a constitution with a unicameral parliament. The chairman of the 12th Supreme Soviet, Serikbolsyn Abdildin, pursued a policy independent of the president. Unlike in neighboring Russia, where a constitutional crisis led to violent clashes, Kazakhstan’s conflict concluded with the parliament dissolving itself.

The president argued that the parliament hindered reform efforts, and some deputies also saw a need to dissolve all councils. On November 16, 1993, the Alatau District Council (Soviet) of Almaty issued an appeal to deputies at all levels, describing the councils as “synonymous with the old regime”. Deputies at all levels, including those of the Supreme Soviet, began resigning. In less than a month and a half, the council system in the republic had dissolved, with more than 25% of council deputies resigning. In December 1993, the Supreme Soviet decided to dissolve itself, transferring all powers to the president until new elections could be held. At the time, critics accused the president of initiating this dissolution. For example, Supreme Soviet Deputy Lyudmila Filaretova openly claimed that the dissolution was the president’s idea but later apologized for this statement. Zamanbek Nurkadilov, then mayor of Almaty, claimed in an interview that he had proposed the idea.

In 1995, following the dissolution of the Supreme Council of Kazakhstan by President Nursultan Nazarbayev, a new legislative body was established through a constitutional referendum held on 30 August 1995. This referendum resulted in the adoption of a new draft of the Constitution of Kazakhstan, which introduced a bicameral parliament, replacing the previous unicameral structure. The new system consisted of two houses: the Mäjilis (lower house) and the Senate (upper house). This reform came after a significant legal challenge when Tatyana Kvyatkovskaya, a journalist and former Supreme Council candidate, filed a lawsuit to annul the results of the 1994 Kazakh legislative elections. The lawsuit led to the dissolution of the Supreme Council and the invalidation of its laws. The formation of the new Parliament marked a political shift in Kazakhstan's political structure, transitioning to a more complex system with separate representation at both the national and regional levels. Elections for the Mäjilis and Senate were held later in 1995, with the Mäjilis elections taking place in two rounds in December 1995, and the Senate elections held on 5 December 1995. This newly established Parliament convened for its first session on 30 January 1996, laying the foundation for Kazakhstan’s new legislative system under the revised Constitution.

In May 2007, amendments were made to the Kazakh Constitution, including changes to the electoral system for the Mäjilis, which shifted from mixed-member proportional representation to party-list proportional representation. Additionally, the amendments reduced the presidential term limits from seven years to five years. However, these changes also paved the way for a more authoritarian system, as the amendments exempted President Nazarbayev from term limits, effectively allowing him to remain in power indefinitely. This led to the 2007 legislative elections, where the ruling Nur Otan party won all the contested seats in the Mäjilis, eliminating opposition and establishing a one-party state for a brief period. The political landscape remained dominated by Nur Otan until minor opposition parties made a return in 2012.

In May 2010, the Kazakh Parliament granted Nursultan Nazarbayev the honorary title of "Elbasy" (meaning "Leader of the Nation"). This title provided Nazarbayev with vast powers, allowing him to control key government policies even without holding the office of President. It also granted him immunity from criminal prosecution for any actions taken during his time in office and protected his family’s assets, ensuring their continued influence in Kazakhstan's political and economic landscape.

== Elections ==
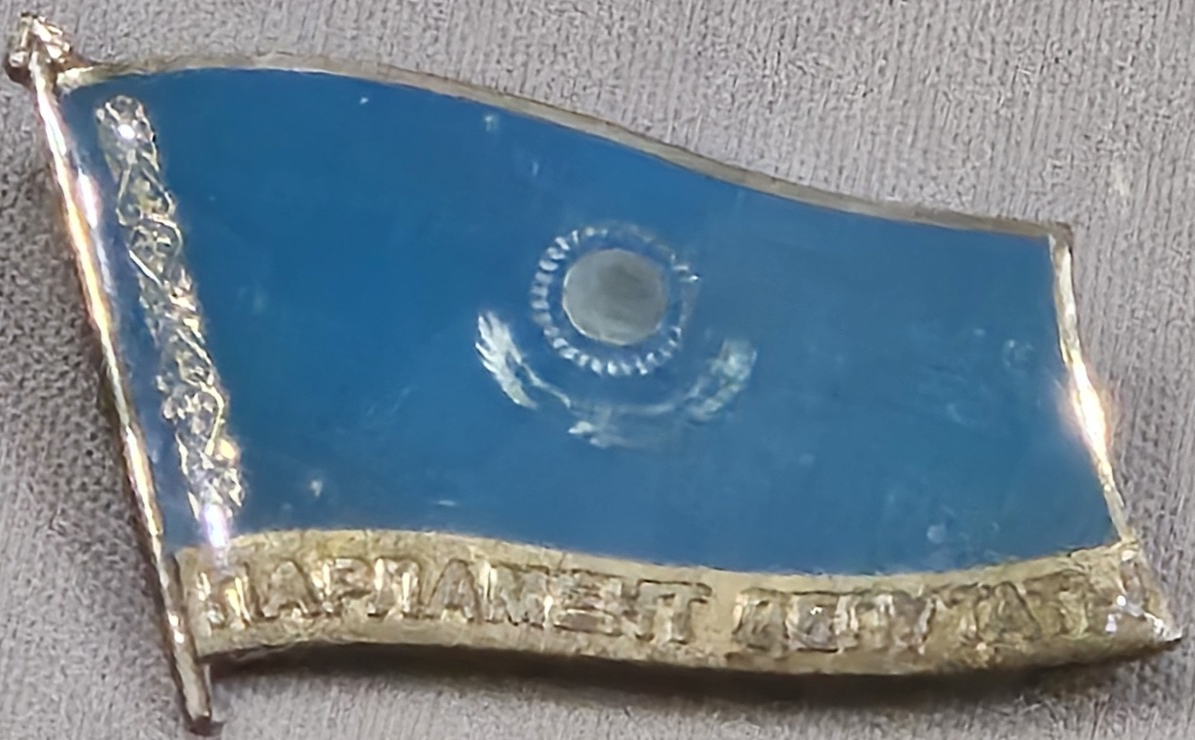
Flag pin of a Member of Parliament, Kazakhstan Military History Museum, Astana, Kazakhstan

Kazakhstan held elections to the Senate on 1 October 2014. According to the Central Electoral Commission of Kazakhstan, it was "an open and democratic electoral process". According to the OSCE, "Preparations for the 26 April election were efficiently administered, however, necessary reforms for holding genuine democratic elections still have to materialize. The predominant position of the incumbent and the lack of genuine opposition limited voter choice. A restricted media environment stifled public debate and freedom of expression."

About 250 observers from the Commonwealth of Independent States and the Shanghai Cooperation Organisation were present for the voting. Four women were among the 80 candidates vying for the 16 open Senate seats. The results were announced on 7 October 2014.

The elections to the Mäjilis of the Sixth convocation took place on 20 March 2016. Six political parties attended the elections, three of them received more than 7% of the votes and passed to the Mäjilis of the Parliament. Those are the Nur Otan Party (82.20%), the Democratic Party of Kazakhstan “AK Zhol” (7.18%), the Communist People's Party of Kazakhstan (CPPK) (7.14%). The Nur Otan Party accounts for 84 deputies in the Mäjilis, the AK Zhol Party – 7 deputies, CPPK – 7 deputies, 9 deputies were elected from the Assembly of People of Kazakhstan and 43 deputies of the previous convocation passed to the Mäjilis of the Sixth Convocation. In general, the deputy composition was renewed by 60%. The new composition of the Mäjilis includes 78 (73%) men, 29 (27%) women. The average age of the deputies is 55 (as of 31 March 2016); Under 40 years old – 7 deputies; from 40 to 60 years old – 77 deputies; over 60 years – 23 deputies. 34 (32%) of deputies have PhD degrees. The deputies represent various spheres: public service, business, NGO, education, science, etc. The ethnic composition of the Mäjilis is as follows Kazakhs, Russians, Ukrainians, as well as representatives of Azerbaijani, Armenian, Dungan, Korean, Uzbek, Uyghur, Chechen and other ethnic groups.

The 2021 election to the Mäjilis of the Parliament of the Republic of Kazakhstan was scheduled for January 10, 2021. Five political parties submitted party lists to the Central Election Commission (CEC). They included Nur Otan, People’s Party, Ak Zhol, Auyl People’s Democratic Patriotic Party and Adal (former Birlik Party) Party.

== See also ==
- List of Chairmen of the Supreme Soviet of the Kazakh Soviet Socialist Republic
- Politics of Kazakhstan
- List of legislatures by country
- List of political parties in Kazakhstan
