= Redistribution (election) =

Reallocation of seats in a legislature

Redistribution (re-districting in the United States and in the Philippines) is the process by which electoral districts are added, removed, or otherwise changed. Redistribution is a form of boundary delimitation that changes electoral district boundaries, usually in response to periodic census results.

Redistribution is required by law or constitution at least every decade in most representative democracy systems that use first-past-the-post or similar electoral systems to prevent geographic malapportionment. The act of manipulation of electoral districts to favour a candidate or party is called gerrymandering.

== Redistribution by country ==
=== Australia ===
In Australia, redistributions are carried out by independent and non-partisan commissioners in the Commonwealth, and in each state or territory. The various electoral acts require the population of each seat to be equal, within certain strictly limited variations. The longest period between two redistributions can be no greater than seven years. Many other triggers can force redistribution before the chronological limit is reached. The redistribution is drafted by civil servants.

=== Canada ===
In Canada, the Constitution mandates that redistribution in the federal House of Commons occurs "on the completion of each decennial census." The number of seats amongst the ten provinces is set by several related constitutional provisions. District boundaries within provinces are based on electoral quotients for that province. Independent boundary commissions issue reports with new district boundaries for each province.

Once the reports are produced, they are then submitted to Parliament. MPs may offer objections to the boundaries, but the boundary commissions are not compelled to make any changes as a result of the objections.

Similar processes are followed in each province, under provincial law.

=== India ===
India has an established process to redistribute its legislative districts. Redistributions are approved by political appointees to the Boundary Commission of India.

=== Ireland ===
The Constitution of Ireland states that general elections to the Dáil (lower house) must use the single transferable vote (STV), that each Dáil constituency must return at least three members (TDs), that boundaries must be revised at least every twelve years, and that the ratio of TDs to inhabitants (not voters or citizens) be between 20,000 and 30,000 on average and "so far as it is practicable" equal between constituencies.

Electoral Acts are passed by the Oireachtas to revise boundaries in light of the most recent census. In constituencies for the next general election, the 2016 population per TD averages 29,762, varying from 28,199 in Dublin North-West to 31,270 in Dún Laoghaire. Since 1977, an independent body (since 1997 a permanent Constituency Commission) recommends boundaries, which the Oireachtas usually accepts.

The terms of reference of the Commission have set five seats as the maximum and discourage constituencies crossing county boundaries. (Note: Large counties may be split into multiple constituencies, and small counties paired in a single constituency, but combining part of one county with part or all of another causes controversy.) A separate Local Electoral Area Boundary Committee fulfils a similar function for local electoral area boundaries. A proposed Electoral Commission would replace both the Constituency Commission and the Local Electoral Area Boundary Committee.

Before 1977, boundary drawing was often partisan in favour of the government of the day. The Electoral (Amendment) Act 1959 was struck out in 1961 by the Supreme Court as being repugnant to the Constitution because of excessive malapportionment. The replacement Electoral (Amendment) Act 1961 relied on manipulating district size (Note: Where the Fianna Fáil party of the then government had less than 50% support, four-seat constituencies were used, so that Fianna Fáil would win two of four seats; where it had more than 50% support, three- or five-seat constituencies would give it two of three, or three of five.)

The Supreme Court allowed the 1961 Act, ruling that the Oireachtas had wide latitude to decide what degree of divergence was "practicable" and what factors could be considered, but reserved the right to judicial review of proposed boundaries. A 1968 proposal rejected by referendum would have specified one-sixth as the maximum constituency divergence from the average population per TD. Another proposal, rejected simultaneously, would have established a constituency commission (ancillary to replacing STV with first-past-the-post voting).

The Electoral (Amendment) Act 1974 attempted a manipulation similar to the 1961 act, but backfired when a larger than expected swing created a tipping point favouring the opposition in 1977. There was a lacuna after the publication of the 2016 census results in which the Electoral (Amendment) (Dáil Constituencies) Act 2013 was in force but its 158 seats breached the 30,000 population average; jurists wondered whether the courts would have permitted a general election in the interim before the Electoral (Amendment) (Dáil Constituencies) Act 2017 resolved the issue.

=== Japan ===
Japan does not have an established process to redistribute its legislative districts. The frequency of redistributions is irregular and not triggered a particular event. Redistributions are approved by the national legislature.

=== Kazakhstan ===
In Kazakhstan, the redistribution of legislative districts is conducted by the Central Election Commission (CEC) as accordance with Articles 12 and 22 of the Constitutional Law "On Elections". Under the guidelines of the CEC, the redistribution cycle for legislative elections takes place at least six months prior to the expiration of the term of elected deputies.

=== Mexico ===
In Mexico, an independent administrative body, called the National Electoral Institute (INE), redraws congressional districts according to an objective scoring function and optimization algorithm. The initial phases of the process are largely determined by redistricting algorithms, although political parties can propose adjustments to maps in later stages.

=== New Zealand ===
New Zealand has a fixed process to determine how its legislative districts are redistributed. Redistribution in New Zealand happens every five years following the census.

=== Philippines ===
In the Philippines, redistricting is carried out by Congress after every quinquennial census is published. However, Congress has never passed a general redistricting act, and instead redistricts provinces or cities piecemeal, or creates new provinces or cities with legislative districts. The last general redistricting law was via the ordinance in the 1987 constitution, which was based from the 1980 census. The creation of a new province or city needs the approval of the public via a plebiscite, while piecemeal redistricting does not need a plebiscite.

=== South Africa ===
The delimitation of voting districts (electoral wards) in South Africa falls under the mandate of the Municipal Demarcation Board (MDB). The independent body, established in 1998 and enshrined in the Constitution, also manages the demarcation of municipal boundaries.

=== United Kingdom ===
In the United Kingdom, there are four Boundary Commissions (one each for England, Scotland, Wales, and Northern Ireland) responsible for reviewing the boundaries of Parliamentary constituencies. These are established by Parliament as arm's-length bodies that operate outside of direct ministerial control. They are chaired by the Speaker of the House of Commons, however by convention they do not participate in the work of the commission.

The Deputy Chair, who must be a serving High Court judge, therefore leads the commission with support from two other independent commissioners whose appointments are made following an open public appointments selection process.

=== United States ===
In the United States, redistribution occurs after each decennial census. Most states' legislative district redistributions are approved by the state legislature. Supreme Court rulings (such as the one man, one vote principle) require that legislative districts have roughly equal populations.

== See also ==
- Apportionment
- Gerrymandering
