= 2007 amendments to the Constitution of Kazakhstan =

The 2007 amendment to the Constitution of Kazakhstan modified Kazakhstan's basic law, on May 18, 2007. The changes followed the conclusion of the activities of the 'State Commission on Democratization' formed two years previously.

In a speech on 16 May 16 to the joint session of the chambers of Parliament, President Nursultan Nazarbayev summarized the development of Kazakhstan since independence in 1991, and outlined his proposed constitutional changes.

The main changes proposed by the President were as follows:

- The reduction of the presidential term from 7-years to 5-years, coming into effect after the next election in 2012
- To adopt proportional representation for the Majilis, or lower Chamber of Deputies
- To increase the number of senators selected by the President, from 7 to 15
- To give to the Senate the power of consultation on the appointment of a President of the National Bank
- To increase the number of Majilis deputies to 107 with 98 deputies elected by proportional representation and 9 deputies representing the Assembly of People of Kazakhstan. The total number of the parliamentary deputies will therefore increase by 38 and will amount to 154
- To strengthen the powers of political parties by depriving members of the Majilis of their mandate in the event that they are expelled from their party
- To make the government accountable not only to the Head of State, but to the whole Parliament; by giving the Government a vote of no-confidence. It will be sufficient for the Majilis to have a simple majority of deputies' votes compared with the previously required two thirds of votes, in order to dismiss the government
- To change the procedure for forming the Constitutional Council and the Central Election Commission. This will occur via the introduction of a law whereby two thirds of the Constitutional Council, the Central Election Commission and Auditing Committee will be formed by Parliament
- To change the procedure of forming the Government, where the Prime Minister is appointed by the President, so that the approval of such appointments, and consequently that of the entire Government, is delegated to the Majilis
- To introduce a change whereby the composition of the Government shall be formed according to the proposals of the Prime Minister. The Prime Minister will also represent the parliamentary majority party
- To abolish the constitutional prohibition of state funding of NGO's
- To develop a procedure for the partial funding of political parties from the state budget
- To abolish the death penalty in Kazakhstan

In addition to these proposals the Kazakh parliament passed an additional amendment two days later, lifting the term-limit clause on the first President of Kazakhstan, Nursultan Nazarbayev. The constitution limits a president to two five-year terms, but this amendment allows the incumbent president--Nazarbayev--to run for an unlimited number of five year terms. Some critics argued this move paved the way for him to become de facto President for life.

== See also ==
- Government of Kazakhstan
- Constitution of Kazakhstan
