= 2004 Kazakh legislative election =

- 19 September 2004 (first round); 3 October 2004 (second round)

All 77 seats in the Mäjilis 39 seats needed for a majority
- Registered: 8,662,188
- Turnout: 56.49% (▼5.97pp)
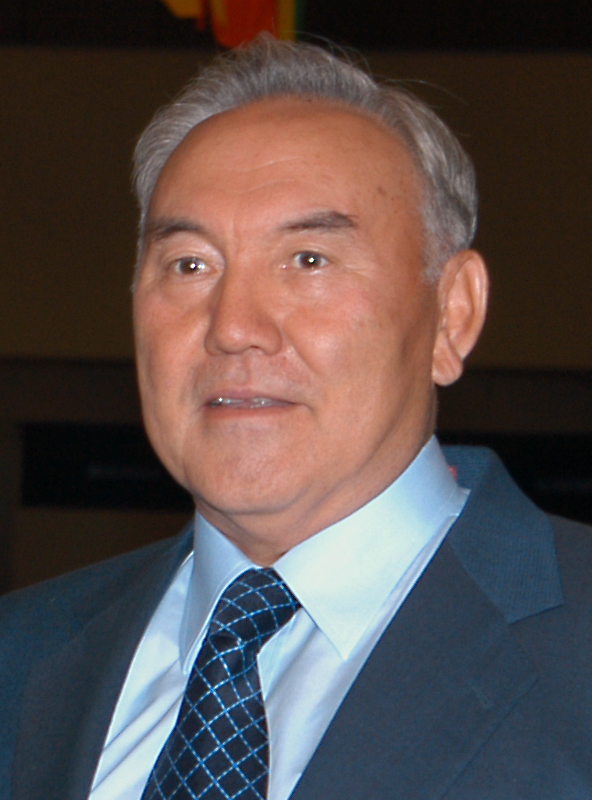

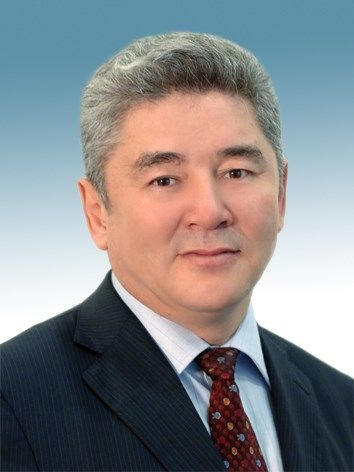

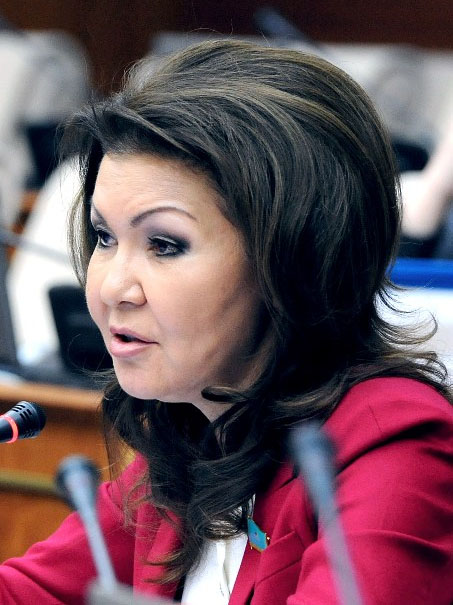

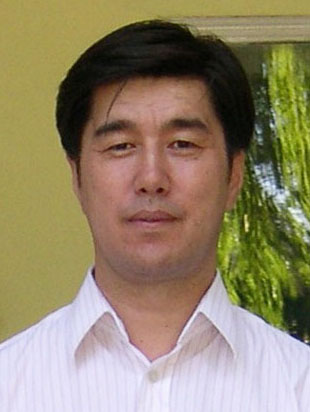
	Majority party	Minority party	Third party
Leader	Nursultan Nazarbayev	Romin Madinov	Dariga Nazarbayeva
Party	Otan	AIST	Asar
Leader since	1 March 1999	28 July 2004	25 October 2003
Last election	23	–	–
Seats won	42	11	4
Seat change	▲19	New	New
Popular vote	2,883,706	336,177	541,239
Percentage	60.6%	7.1%	11.4%
	Fourth party	Fifth party
Leader	Alikhan Baimenov	Maksut Narikbaev
Party	Aq Jol	Ädilet
Leader since	31 July 2004	14 June 2004
Last election	–	–
Seats won	1	1
Seat change	New	New
Popular vote	572,672	36,379
Percentage	12.0%	0.8%
Chairman before election
Zharmakhan Tuyakbay
Otan
Elected Chairman
Zharmakhan Tuyakbay
Otan

Legislative elections were held in Kazakhstan on 19 September and 3 October 2004. The Otan party won 42 of the 77 seats, gaining a majority in the Mäjilis.

== Background ==
By 2003 the Kazakh economy was on a recovery with its GDP growth rate being 9.2% which was one of the highest rates among the CIS countries. The primary cause was due to the increased cost of petroleum as a result of the American-led war in Afghanistan, which allowed the government to repay its debts and raise pensions, average salaries and improve medical services. The quality of life in Kazakhstan was improving, as the average monthly salaries increased to about 28,000 Tenge ($198) or about 8.3% increase from 2002. This increase however was not spread evenly. Some groups benefited greatly from the increasing wages, while about 25% of Kazakhs especially in the southwestern districts and regions around the Caspian Sea continued to live below the poverty line.

Despite improvements in the economy and social issues, Kazakhstan faced problems with the lack of independent media, a poor human rights record and the unfair treatment of independent journalists, including the case of Sergei Duvanov who was arrested in October 2002, a few days before his travel to the United States to discuss corruption and the situation with the Kazakh medi, when he was accused of sexually assaulting a minor. Due to international pressure, including from American Secretary of State Colin Powell, Duvanov was released in January 2004.

In the years leading up to the elections, political parties had been significantly weakened. The process of re-registration of parties in spring 2003 particularly affected the opposition due to a law that raised the minimum number of members for parties to be able to register to 50,000. Several opposition parties were unable to meet this requirement.

== Results ==
Party	Proportional			First round			Second round			Total seats	+/–
Party	Votes	%	Seats	Votes	%	Seats	Votes	%	Seats	Total seats	+/–
Otan	2,883,706	60.61	7			26			9	42	+18
Aq Jol	572,672	12.04	1			0			0	1	New
Asar	541,239	11.38	1			2			1	4	New
Agrarian-Industrial Union of Workers	336,177	7.07	1			9			1	11	–5
Opposition Union of Communists and QDT Bloc	163,824	3.44	0			0			0	0	–3
People's Communist Party of Kazakhstan	94,140	1.98	0			0			0	0	New
Auyl People's Democratic Patriotic Party	82,523	1.73	0			0			0	0	New
Democratic Party	36,379	0.76	0			0			1	1	New
Party of Patriots	26,287	0.55	0			0			0	0	New
Rukhaniyat Party	20,826	0.44	0			0			0	0	0
Independents						8			10	18	–5
Total	4,757,773	100.00	10			45			22	77	0
Valid votes	4,757,773	97.23									
Invalid/blank votes	135,431	2.77									
Total votes	4,893,204	100.00					1,250,675	–			
Registered voters/turnout	8,662,188	56.49		8,662,188	–		2,766,465	45.21			
Source: CEC, CNN IPU
