= Kazakh presidential elections =

Presidential elections in Kazakhstan determine who will serve as the President of Kazakhstan for a seven-year term. Following the constitutional reforms of 2022, the president is now limited to a single, non-renewable seven-year term. Prior to this, from 2011 to 2019, presidents could serve five-year terms with the possibility of re-election. Before that, from 1991 to 2005, the presidential term lasted seven years, with varying limits.

Since the establishment of the presidency in 1990, Kazakh presidential elections have been held in 1991, 1999, 2005, 2011, 2015, 2019, and 2022. The next election is expected to take place in 2029, barring any changes or early elections.

Presidential elections in Kazakhstan are conducted by direct popular vote. While elections have regularly been held, international observers and critics have often raised concerns about the fairness of the electoral process, citing limited political competition and restrictions on opposition candidates.

== Electoral legislation ==
The election of the President of Kazakhstan is governed by the Constitutional Law of the Republic of Kazakhstan, which outlines the processes and principles for holding elections. According to the law, the President is elected through universal, equal, and direct suffrage via a secret ballot for a seven-year term. This legal framework ensures that the election process is fair and transparent, setting clear guidelines for the nomination, registration, and voting procedures. The law also specifies eligibility requirements for candidates and provides mechanisms for resolving electoral disputes.

=== Eligibility ===
The Constitution of Kazakhstan sets the following requirements for presidential candidates:

- The candidate must be a citizen of Kazakhstan by birth.
- The candidate must be at least 40 years old.
- The candidate must be fluent in the state language (Kazakh).
- The candidate must have been a resident of Kazakhstan for at least 15 years.
- The candidate must hold a higher education degree.
- The candidate must have at least 5 years of experience in public service or elected public office.
- The candidate must have the right to vote.
- The candidate must not have been declared legally incompetent by a court or be under detention by court order.

These criteria are outlined by Kazakhstan's Constitution and Constitutional Law, ensuring that presidential candidates possess the necessary qualifications and are legally eligible to run for office.

=== Procedure ===
==== Nomination of candidates ====
In Kazakhstan, the right to nominate presidential candidates is granted to national public associations that are registered according to the established procedure. These associations play a critical role in the nomination process, ensuring that only qualified individuals are put forward for the presidency.

The nomination process itself begins the day after the official announcement. This period allows public associations to propose their candidates in a timely manner.

Presidential candidates are nominated by republican public associations on behalf of their supreme bodies. Importantly, these associations are allowed to nominate individuals who may not be members of the association itself. However, each public association can only nominate one candidate for the presidency. The decision to nominate a candidate must be approved by a majority vote from the members of the association’s supreme body. This decision is officially documented in an extract from the meeting minutes. Once the decision is made, it is communicated to the nominated candidate, and the relevant documents, including the candidate's consent to run, are submitted to the Central Election Commission (CEC).

If, by the registration deadline, fewer than two candidates are registered, the CEC is authorized to extend the nomination period by up to an additional 20 days. This ensures that the electoral process remains competitive and representative.

=== Registration of candidates ===
The registration of candidates for President of Kazakhstan is carried out by the Central Election Commission (CEC). Candidates, along with their spouses, are required to submit declarations of assets and liabilities to the state revenue authorities on the first day of the nomination period, as specified by the Constitutional Law. These declarations must be submitted in the manner and form established by the relevant state body responsible for ensuring tax collection. Organizations that receive requests for information about the candidates' assets and liabilities are required to provide this information within four days.

In addition, a presidential candidate must undergo a medical examination to confirm that they do not have any conditions that would hinder their ability to perform the duties of the President. The results of this medical examination are documented in a medical report. The requirements for this medical assessment and a list of diseases that may prevent registration are determined by a joint regulatory legal act issued by the CEC and the authorized health authority.

Candidates nominated by a public association must submit several documents for registration, including the meeting minutes of the association's supreme body confirming the nomination, the candidate's application for consent to run for office, protocols from territorial election commissions verifying the authenticity of collected citizens' signatures, biographical data, and certificates of submission of asset declarations. Additionally, candidates must provide proof of election contribution and a medical opinion confirming their health status.

Once registered, the CEC will publish a list of the candidates in the mass media, including personal details such as the candidate's name, birth year, position, work, and place of residence. Candidates will also receive official certificates of registration.

If a candidate fails to comply with the nomination rules, fails to submit necessary documents, or is found to be incompatible with constitutional or legal requirements, the CEC may refuse registration or cancel a previously granted registration. In cases where the candidate's declarations of assets and liabilities are found to be false, registration may be revoked. Candidates also cannot engage in electoral campaigning before registration or use their official position for electoral purposes. Candidates can appeal a refusal to register or cancellation of their registration to the Supreme Court, which must review the appeal within ten days. The decision of the Supreme Court is final.

==== Popular vote ====
The results of the vote counting in the presidential election are established during a meeting of the territorial election commission. These results are documented in a protocol, which is signed by the chairman and members of the commission. The protocol is then submitted to the Central Election Commission (CEC). Any issues related to the determination of the results of the vote counting will be addressed following the rules set out in the General Part of this Constitutional Law.

If there are more than two presidential candidates on the ballot and none of them is elected, the CEC will organize a second round of voting between the two candidates who received the most votes. In the event that one of the candidates withdraws, the next highest-vote candidate will be included in the ballot for the repeat voting. This repeat voting must adhere to the requirements laid out in this Constitutional Law. The details of the repeat voting, including the date and process, will be announced in the media.

If the election of the President of the Republic of Kazakhstan is declared null and void or if the repeat voting fails to determine a winner, the CEC will be responsible for scheduling a re-run of the presidential election. Voting takes place at the same polling stations, and the voter registers used for the initial election will remain in effect. The formation of election commissions, the nomination and registration of candidates, and all other election-related activities will follow the procedures outlined in this Constitutional Law. However, the CEC will determine the shortened timelines for these activities. The re-run election will be announced in the media.

==== Election calendar ====
- Nomination period: The nomination of presidential candidates begins the day after the announcement of the election and period ends at 18:00 local time, two months before the election day.
- Registration period: Registration for candidates opens two months before the election and closes at 18:00 local time, forty days before the election day.
- Verification of candidate declarations: The State Revenue Authorities must verify the reliability of declared assets and liabilities within 15 days of candidate registration.
- Election campaigning: Candidates may begin campaigning once their registration is finalized and must adhere to specific guidelines about the use of media platforms and campaign activities. The exact start and end dates for campaigning are generally determined by the Central Election Commission and subject to the official electoral calendar.
- Election day: Voting for the presidential election takes place on the designated election day, which is publicly announced by the Central Election Commission.
- First round vote: Following the closure of voting on election day, territorial election commissions will begin the vote counting process and submit results to the Central Election Commission within two days.
- Repeat voting (if necessary): If no candidate receives the required majority, a second round of voting will occur within two months, between the top two candidates who received the most votes.
- Re-run of election (if necessary): If the initial election is declared invalid or a re-run is necessary, the Central Election Commission will appoint a re-run of the election within two months after the initial voting.
- Certification of election results: The Central Election Commission will establish the election results within seven days based on the territorial election commission's protocols, with the elected candidate being one who receives more than 50% of the vote or more votes than the opponent in a re-run.
- Registration of elected president: The Central Election Commission will register the elected president within seven days, but may refuse registration if issues arise in at least one-fourth of electoral districts or administrative-territorial units, such as elections being declared null and void or violations occurring during the election process, with the decision being appealable to the Supreme Court within ten days.

=== Results ===
Year	First round			Second round		Notes	Ref.
Year	Winner	Runner-up	No. of other candidates	Winner	Runner-up	Notes	Ref.
1991	Nursultan Nazarbayev; Independent; 61.59%	No candidate	None	-	-	Nazarbayev won absolute majority in first round; no second round needed	
1999	Nursultan Nazarbayev; Independent; 81.00%	Serikbolsyn Abdildin; QKP; 11.19%	2	-	-	Election originally scheduled for 2000 but brought forward; Nazarbayev won absolute majority in first round; no second round needed.	
2005	Nursultan Nazarbayev; Otan (People's Coalition); 91.15%	Zharmakhan Tuyakbay; Independent (For a Just Kazakhstan); 6.61%	3	-	-	Election originally scheduled for 2006 but brought forward; Nazarbayev won absolute majority in first round; no second round needed.	
2011	Nursultan Nazarbayev; Nur Otan; 95.55%	Gani Qasymov; QPP; 1.94%	2	-	-	Election originally scheduled for 2012 but brought forward; Nazarbayev won absolute majority in first round; no second round needed.	
2015	Nursultan Nazarbayev; Nur Otan; 97.75%	Turgyn Syzdyqov; QKHP; 1.61%	1	-	-	Election originally scheduled for 2016 but brought forward; Nazarbayev won absolute majority in first round; no second round needed.	
2019	Kassym-Jomart Tokayev (Nur Otan); 70.96%	Amirjan Qosanov; Independent (Ult Tagdyry); 16.23%	5	-	-	Election originally scheduled for 2020 but brought forward after resignation of President Nursultan Nazarbayev; acting president Tokayev won absolute majority in first round; no second round needed.	
2022	Kassym-Jomart Tokayev; Independent (People's Coalition); 81.31%	Jiguli Dairabaev; Independent (Auyl); 3.42%	4	-	-	Election originally scheduled for 2024 but brought forward after 2022 constitutional referendum; Tokayev won absolute majority in first round; no second round needed.	

== See also ==
- Politics of Kazakhstan
- Elections in Kazakhstan
- President of Kazakhstan
- Constitution of Kazakhstan
