= 2015 Kazakh presidential election =

Presidential election in Kazakhstan

- 26 April 2015
- Turnout: 95.21% (▲5.22pp)
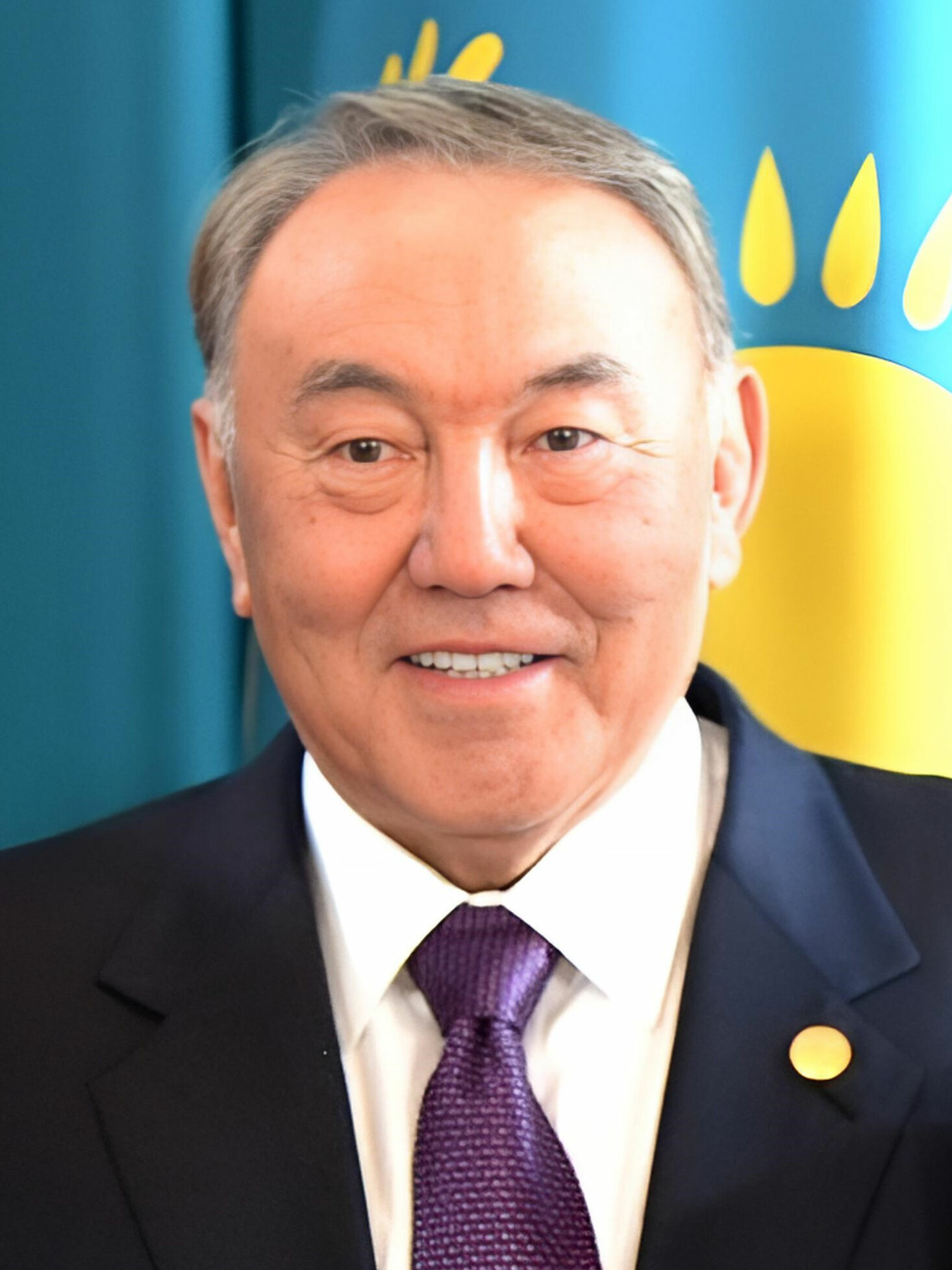

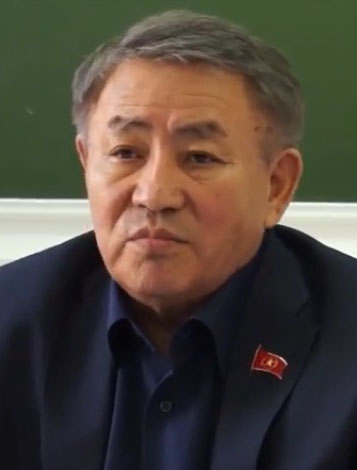
Nominee	Nursultan Nazarbayev	Turgyn Syzdyqov
Party	Nur Otan	QKHP
Popular vote	8,833,250	145,756
Percentage	97.75%	1.61%
President before election
Nursultan Nazarbayev
Nur Otan
Elected President
Nursultan Nazarbayev
Nur Otan

Snap presidential elections were held in Kazakhstan on 26 April 2015 to elect the President of Kazakhstan. This was the fifth presidential election held and second without having any formal opposition candidates. With the highest-ever nationwide turnout of 95.2%, the result was a victory for long-term incumbent President Nursultan Nazarbayev of Nur Otan who received 97.8% of the vote, the largest since 1991, thus winning a fifth term in office while his closest challenger, Turgyn Syzdyqov, received only 1.6% of the votes.

Having been originally scheduled for 2016, the election was held a year earlier after numerous calls and support from the Assembly of People of Kazakhstan, the Parliament, as well as political parties for President Nursultan Nazarbayev to support a snap election in order to properly continue the country's development and to avoid for Mazhilis elections to be held simultaneously which were also set for the following year. After the Constitutional Council ruling on 25 February 2015, which stated that the president has the authority to call for snap elections, Nazarbayev that same day signed a decree setting the election date for 26 April.

Nominations of candidates began following the established election day. Of all registered political parties, only two took a decision to participate in the elections by nominating candidates of which were incumbent president Nursultan Nazarbayev from the Nur Otan, and Turgyn Syzdyqov from the Communist People's Party of Kazakhstan while the rest of pro-government parties all endorsed Nazarbayev except for the opposition Nationwide Social Democratic Party. Numerous self-nominees announced their presidential bids in which most of them later withdrew or rejected by the Central Election Commission except for Äbilgazy Qusaiynov, the incumbent chairman of the Federation of Trade Unions of Kazakhstan, leaving the race to be contested by just three candidates, the least of all Kazakhstan's elections.

Campaigning took place in midst of an economic crisis following the 2010s oil glut and the devaluation of the Russian ruble, which severely impacted the Kazakh economy as the solution to the issues during the elections regarding the country's economy were raised, along with the continued Nazarbayev's reforms, social, environmental and industrial safety problems. Despite different proposals and idea from candidates, most of the platforms made by Nazarbayev were the most visible and known to the public.

On 29 April 2015, President Nazarbayev was inaugurated at the Palace of Independence in Astana after winning re-election bid, to which the Organization for Security and Co-operation in Europe reported "serious procedural deficiencies and irregularities" and that voters were offered limited choices. From there, Nazarbayev pledged to implement his proposed five institutional reforms. He continued serving his fifth and final term before eventually resigning in 2019.

== Background ==
Incumbent President Nursultan Nazarbayev was elected for a fourth term in the 2011 Kazakh presidential election, winning over 95% of the vote. From there, he promised in continuing economic, political and social reforms. During that time, the Kazakh government had received criticism from the opposition in the country and internationally due to Nur Otan's single-party control of the Parliament which it gained in 2007. Minor parties made their eventual return to the lower-house Mazhilis in 2012 although they were considered to be loyal to the authorities. Complaints of human rights abuses continued in the country as the Kazakh government was accused on cracking and shutting down independent media outlets and opposition groups that mostly covered the Zhanaozen massacre where the police opened fire on striking oil workers, which resulted in deaths of 12 people.

Despite the poor record of human rights and lack of improvements in democracy, Kazakhstan continued in having a huge economic growth thanks to its stabilized oil and gas industry. In December 2012, during an address to the nation, Nazarbayev unveiled the Kazakhstan 2050 Strategy economic plan which aimed to bring the country into the top 30 most developed nations by 2050. In 2013, Kazakhstan reached its highest annual GDP record with $236.6 billion, making it the biggest in Central Asia and placing it 45th in the world. However, the economic growth became short-lived after on 11 February 2014, when the Kazakh tenge lost its value by 19%, worse since 2009 after Russia faced its ruble currency value loss. Due to international sanctions that were imposed on Russia, Kazakhstan's main trading partner, after the annexation of Crimea in March 2014, trade between those two countries decreased by 24.6%. This sparked unusual public protests in the country which resulted in Nazarbayev's dismissal of the government led by Prime Minister Serik Akhmetov and the reappointment of Karim Massimov to the post. As a result of the oil price crash which began in September 2014, the Kazakh government resorted in cutting budget spending as the price of oil amounted to 25% of Kazakhstan's GDP. In an attempt to bolster economic growth, Nazarbayev in his presidential address on 11 November 2014 announced an economic stimulus plan named Nurly Zhol, which would allocate $3 billion from the reserve fund a year to fund the program's various parts.

=== Calls for snap election ===
On 14 February 2015, the Assembly of People of Kazakhstan (QHA) unanimously voted on the initiative to move presidential elections forward from 2016 to 2015. One motivation was that a snap election would help the development of the country; another one was that it is a disadvantage to hold both presidential and parliamentary elections in the same year, telling:

"The President of the country, Nursultan Nazarbayev, must be given a new mandate of national trust for the successful passage of the country in the period of global trials. At a new and difficult stage of global imbalances, it is necessary to trust Elbasy N. A. Nazarbayev so that the country does not stray from its strategic course and continues its path towards large-scale modernization of the country and advancement into the 30 most powerful states in the world."

On 16 February, the decision made by QHA was supported by the ruling party Nur Otan, as well as the parliamentary faction of the party in Mazhilis, led by Nazarbayev's daughter Dariga. Two other minor parties in the Mazhilis: Ak Zhol Democratic Party (AJ) and Communist People's Party of Kazakhstan (QKHP), also supported the idea of a snap presidential elections with QKHP secretary Aiqyn Qongyrov announcing that the party would nominate its own candidate. Former 2011 presidential candidate Mels Eleusizov and the head of the Attan-Kazakhstan movement Amantai Asylbek both expressed their desire to participate in the elections. The opposition Nationwide Social Democratic Party announced that the party would make a decision on the participation and nomination of candidates only after Nazarbayev announces the decision on his intention to resign early and announces snap elections.

On 18 February, the Mazhilis unanimously asked President Nursultan Nazarbayev to move the elections. That same day, the Kazakhstan Alliance of Bloggers called for an abandonment of the elections and instead, proposed to hold a referendum on the extension of the presidential term until 2022 in order to save money and "avoid serious reputational risks".

The following day on 19 February, the Senate took upon decision on whether to allow snap elections. In the first vote, 41 senators supported the proposal and with only one voting against it. However, after discussing a number of other issues on the agenda, Senate Chair Kassym-Jomart Tokayev asked members to re-vote again on the decision, saying "something I didn't like there. It's technical. Let's re-vote. Let's re-vote. Someone voted very inattentively. It's just for the purity of the experiment, as they say." According to the results of the second vote, the senators unanimously supported the snap elections, with the first vote being explained as a technical error. Following the revote, Tokayev appealed to the Constitutional Council with a request to give an official interpretation of the constitutional clause, which regulates the appointment of snap presidential elections.

On 24 February, the Constitutional Council adopted a normative resolution of the Constitution which following said:

"It should be understood in such a way that the President of the Republic of Kazakhstan has the exclusive right to single-handedly call early presidential elections. The Constitution of the Republic does not provide for any conditions and restrictions when the Head of State makes a decision on the appointment of early presidential elections, when deciding on the appointment of such elections, the rule provided for in Paragraph 3 of Article 41 of the Constitution of the Republic of Kazakhstan on the inadmissibility of coincidence in terms of the election of the President of Kazakhstan with elections of the new composition of the Parliament of the Republic."

That same day, President Nursultan Nazarbayev signed the decree calling for snap elections, scheduling them for 26 April 2015. He announced it during a live broadcast on the Khabar TV channel, noting that he would make a decision regarding his participation in the elections later.

== Candidates ==
Nomination of presidential candidates took place between 26 February and 15 March 2015 with the registration deadline set on 25 March. Participants were required to collect signatures by at least 1% of total eligible voters whom equally representing at least two-thirds of the regions and the cities of Almaty and Astana.

Several parties expressed interests and possibilities on nominating their candidates while others opted out of participation. The Nationwide Social Democratic Party (JSDP) deputy chairman Petr Svoik said that there should be only two candidates with one being the incumbent and another being from the opposition party. He noted that the JSDP would nominate is candidate after President Nursultan Nazarbayev would decide in his participation in the elections or not. Failed 2011 presidential nominee and chairman of Party of Patriots of Kazakhstan Gani Qasymov declined to run, expressing that the country needs "new faces, new people and more candidates from a new generation."

=== Registered ===
Nominee, age	Political party	Occupation	Registration date
Nursultan Nazarbayev (74)	Nur Otan	President of Kazakhstan (1991–2019); Chairman of Nur Otan (1999–present); Chairman of Assembly of People (1995–present)	15 March 2015
Turgyn Syzdyqov (67)	QKHP	Secretary of the Communist People's Party (2014–2016); Advisor to the Rector of the Kokshetau State University (2013–2014); Chief of Staff of Akmola Regional Mäslihat (2003–2013)	17 March 2015
Äbilgazy Qusaiynov (63)	Independent	Chairman of the Federation of Trade Unions (2013–2017); Äkim of Karaganda Region (2012–2013); Minister of Transport and Communications (2009–2011); Senator for Karaganda Region (1995–1999)	18 March 2015

== Campaign ==
=== Turgyn Syzdyqov ===
At the Communist People's Party of Kazakhstan (QKHP) Congress, Turgyn Syzdyqov was unanimously nominated to be the presidential candidate for the party on 4 March 2015. The QKHP considered proposing two other candidates for the nomination to which they themselves reject the offer, thus making Syzdyqov the sole choice for the party nominee. QKHP Honorary Secretary Vladislav Kosarev at the congress, called Syzdyqov "an excellent family man, calm, balanced" that "knows the situation, painfully experiences all the processes taking place."

Syzdyqov's campaign proclaimed the beginning of the party's open struggle against the "capitalist exploitation of wage labor" and "bourgeois principles of distribution of material goods". Syzdyqov argued that the material goods should be given to all members of society, regardless of their social status and called for universal health care and free education, claiming it to be as a basis for scientific and technological progress and participation of the masses of workers without a complete return to a Soviet-communist model, saying that the capital should be dealt within the economy by providing workers with decent payment of labour. Despite admitting not having the chance of winning presidency, Syzdyqov hoped for a second place win.

=== Nursultan Nazarbayev ===
On 11 March 2015, the 16th Nur Otan Ordinary Congress was held in Astana to which it was attended by around 2,000 party delegates. Academician Kenzhegali Sagadiyev proposed to nominate incumbent President Nursultan Nazarbayev for the candidacy, stressing that "he [Nazarbayev] has passed the turning points of history, under his leadership the Kazakh people have overcome considerable challenges." Nazarbayev, at the congress, accepted the offer and from there, he urged all Kazakhstanis to buy domestically made products and called for the entrepreneurs to produce better products to compete with imports as the devaluation of the Russian ruble had "reduced competitiveness".

At the congress, Nazarbayev announced five institutional reforms to strengthen Kazakhstan to which were: 1) continued liberalization policies with an increased reports by the local government leaders; 2) ensured decision-making transparency with civic involvement by a law on an access to public information; 3) introduction of civil budgeting with an involvement by civic representatives during process of budget allocation; 4) strengthening of the justice system by making it easier of citizens to appeal against the actions by employees; 5) insurance on self-regulation in society by the transfer of power from state agencies to civil society institutions.

In regards to democratic reforms, Nazarbayev expressed dangers, claiming that "forced democratization" doesn't guarantee the stability of the country nor a successful economic modernization and then compared developed countries whom were criticised for authoritarianism such as Singapore and Malaysia.

On the following day on 12 March, the Ak Zhol Democratic Party (AJ) held its 12th Congress. From there, the party decided not to participate in the elections instead endorse Nazarbayev's presidential bid. AJ Chairman Azat Peruashev stated that there was no political figure comparable to Nazarbayev, saying "Nazarbayev has done more than anyone else for the development of business, promotion of the national interests of Kazakhstan. Whether someone likes it or not, Nazarbayev has not belonged only to himself for a long time, this is a figure of a global historical scale for the entire post-Soviet space."

=== Äbilgazy Qusaiynov ===
On 12 March 2015, Federation of Trade Unions of Kazakhstan (QRKF) Chairman Äbilgazy Qusaiynov applied for candidacy in the elections. From there, he said "elections are always an opportunity to raise pressing issues of society and draw attention to such pressing problems in the life of every person as, for example, issues of ecology and industrial safety in general," and stated that his goal was to raise public awareness regarding these issues.

Qusaiynov's campaign headquarters was opened on 26 March in Astana where it revealed electoral programs, specifically towards environmental issues. Qusaiynov called for the country's transition into environmental friendly development in course of human development which would stimulate the economic growth with a need of adhere to the principles of industrial safety and compliance with technical regulations. He advocated for systemic public control over the activities of enterprises to ensure the safety of products and processes.

The RFE/RL attempted to interview Qusaiynov which was unsuccessful as Qusaiynov only reserved himself to journalists whom were accredited in his campaign headquarters. Nevertheless, Qusaiynov's campaign received mixed reactions among several Kazakhstanis. Failed presidential candidate and known ecologist Mels Eleusizov fired back on Qusaiynov's environmental concerns, claiming that he was an "ecologist" only for the campaign, saying "an official as an official is no different from his own kind." Civil activist Valentina Makhotina expressed her doubts on Qusaiynov work at improving worker's conditions, claiming that under his tenure as QRKF Chairman, a new law which was adopted deprived workers' rights to form independent trade unions, while journalist Aigul Omarova believed that Qusaiynov did not belong to any political clan.

== Conduct ==
The Organization for Security and Co-operation in Europe (OSCE) criticized the election, saying that "there is a lack of a credible opposition in the country." It also said that "[v]oters were not offered a genuine choice between political alternatives," and that "[t]here were significant restrictions to the freedom of expression, as well as to the media environment."

== Results ==
Candidate	Party	Votes	%
Nursultan Nazarbayev	Nur Otan	8,833,250	97.75
Turgyn Syzdyqov	Communist People's Party	145,756	1.61
Äbilgazy Qusaiynov	Independent	57,718	0.64
Total		9,036,724	100.00
Valid votes		9,036,724	99.40
Invalid/blank votes		54,196	0.60
Total votes		9,090,920	100.00
Registered voters/turnout		9,547,864	95.21
Source: CEC
