= 2011 Kazakh presidential election =

- 3 April 2011
- Turnout: 89.99% (▲13.19pp)
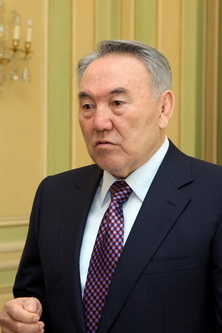

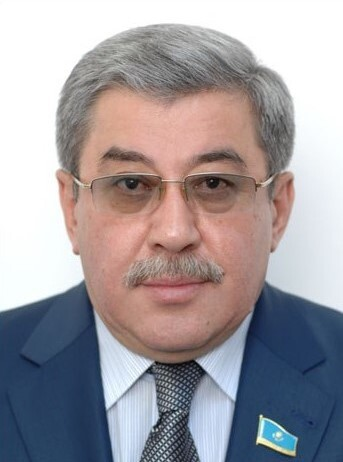
Nominee	Nursultan Nazarbayev	Gani Qasymov
Party	Nur Otan	Party of Patriots
Popular vote	7,850,958	159,036
Percentage	95.55%	1.94%
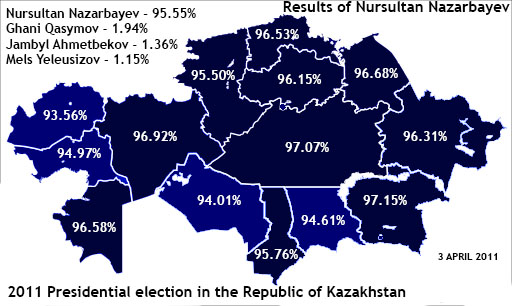
- Results by region
President before election
Nursultan Nazarbayev
Nur Otan
Elected President
Nursultan Nazarbayev
Nur Otan

Early presidential elections were held in Kazakhstan on 3 April 2011, having been originally scheduled for 2012. The elections were called after a plan for holding a referendum to increase president term limits to 2020 was rejected by the Constitutional Council. Nazarbayev was re-elected for a fourth term with 95% of the vote and a 90% turnout, against three nominal candidates. The Organization for Security and Co-operation in Europe (OSCE) has complained about a lack of transparency and competition in the vote.

== Background ==
A referendum on extending presidential term limits was proposed to be held around March 2011. President Nursultan Nazarbayev's term was due to expire in 2012 and the referendum would have bypassed the next two scheduled elections. A Kazakh official stated that the move would "help save our efforts and resources since everyone knows the outcome of the elections beforehand." It would have been the second referendum on extending Nazarbayev's term in office, the first in 1995 having extended his term until 2000, whilst in 2007 parliament amended the electoral law to allow candidates to run without term limits.

Although Nazarbayev rejected the proposal, it would still have gone ahead if 80% of the members of the parliament (100% controlled by his party) voted for it, or if a public petition obtained at least 200,000 signatures. Media reports suggested that a petition for the referendum had already been signed by 2,600,000 people.

On 31 January the Constitutional Council rejected the referendum proposal for a Constitutional amendment aimed at extending Nazarbayev's term till 2020, on the ground that the amendment did not specify for how long and how many times the Presidential term could be extended. The Court therefore referred the matter to the President himself, as required by the Constitution of Kazakhstan. Nazarbayev agreed on putting aside the Constitutional referendum and immediately called for an early presidential election. According to analysts, Nazarbayev may have stepped back from the plan of term extension due to negative reactions by both USA, EU and OSCE, and in order to buy five years time to settle succession issues.

== Candidates ==
Twenty-two potential candidates were counted before the registration process began; their number was finally reduced to four, including no established opposition leaders. Strict registration requirements include a rigorous examination in Kazakh language skills (in daily life nowadays supplanted by Russian language), as well as a high number of signature, but no clear criteria for evaluation of the language skills or the verification of the signature lists is present, thus providing administration with wide discretion. The law requiring fluency in Kazakh was enacted in the 1990s, but enforcement had never been stringent in previous elections. Opponents charged that the test was administered in such a way as to disqualify Nazarbayev's opponents.

- Little-known environmental activist Musaghali Duambekov, leader of the movement For a Green Planet and reportedly close to president Nursultan Nazarbayev's nephew Qairat Satybaldy, took the required Kazakh language test on 9 February 2011 and thus became the first candidate.
- Nazarbayev himself announced on 11 February 2011 that he would run for reelection. His candidacy was approved on 18 February 2011.
- Former member of parliament Ualikhan Qaisarov had taken the test on 8 February 2011 and failed.
- In total, eight candidates have either withdrawn their applications or failed the mandatory Kazakh language test. Later, during the oath ceremony, Nazarbayev was reported to fall in several linguistic mistakes

=== Registered candidates ===
Candidate	Political party	Occupation	Registration date
Nursultan Nazarbayev	Nur Otan	President of Kazakhstan (1990–2019)	18 February 2011
Jambyl Ahmetbekov	Communist People's Party of Kazakhstan (QKHP)	Secretary of Central Committee of the Communist People's Party of Kazakhstan	26 February 2011
Gani Qasymov	Party of Patriots of Kazakhstan (QPP)	Member of the Mazhilis (1999–2005)	28 February 2011
Mels Eleusizov	Tabigat (Nature) ecological union	Ecologist	28 February 2011

All other candidates support Nazarbayev, and Qasymov reportedly passed the language test despite not even speaking the language. The environmentalist Mels Yeleusizov, even admitted to voting for Nazarbayev.

The short timespan before election (two months since its declaration) was cited by opposition leaders as impeding them to prepare and contest the poll. They therefore refused to take part in the vote and called for a boycott.

The option to vote "against all", common in post-Soviet countries, was last legally available in the 1999 presidential election.

== Budget ==
4.7 billion tenge ($32 million) have been allocated by the Kazakh government as election budget, with an increase of $11.6 million in comparison with previous presidential election in 2005, justified with inflation and higher salaries for local election commission personnel.

== Media ==
Independent NGOs such as RFE/RL have reported increasing censorship by Kazakh authorities since February.

On March 2, RFE/RL reported severe disruption of access to its websites, allegedly linked to orders received by government-controlled service providers KazTelecom and Nursat.

== Monitoring ==
The OSCE/ODIHR has opened an electoral observation mission, headed by Ambassador Daan Everts, including 25 experts, 28 long-term observers, and 400 seconded short-term observers, in order to assess the election for compliance with OSCE commitments and other international standards /for democratic elections, as well as with domestic legislation.

== Reported pressures ==
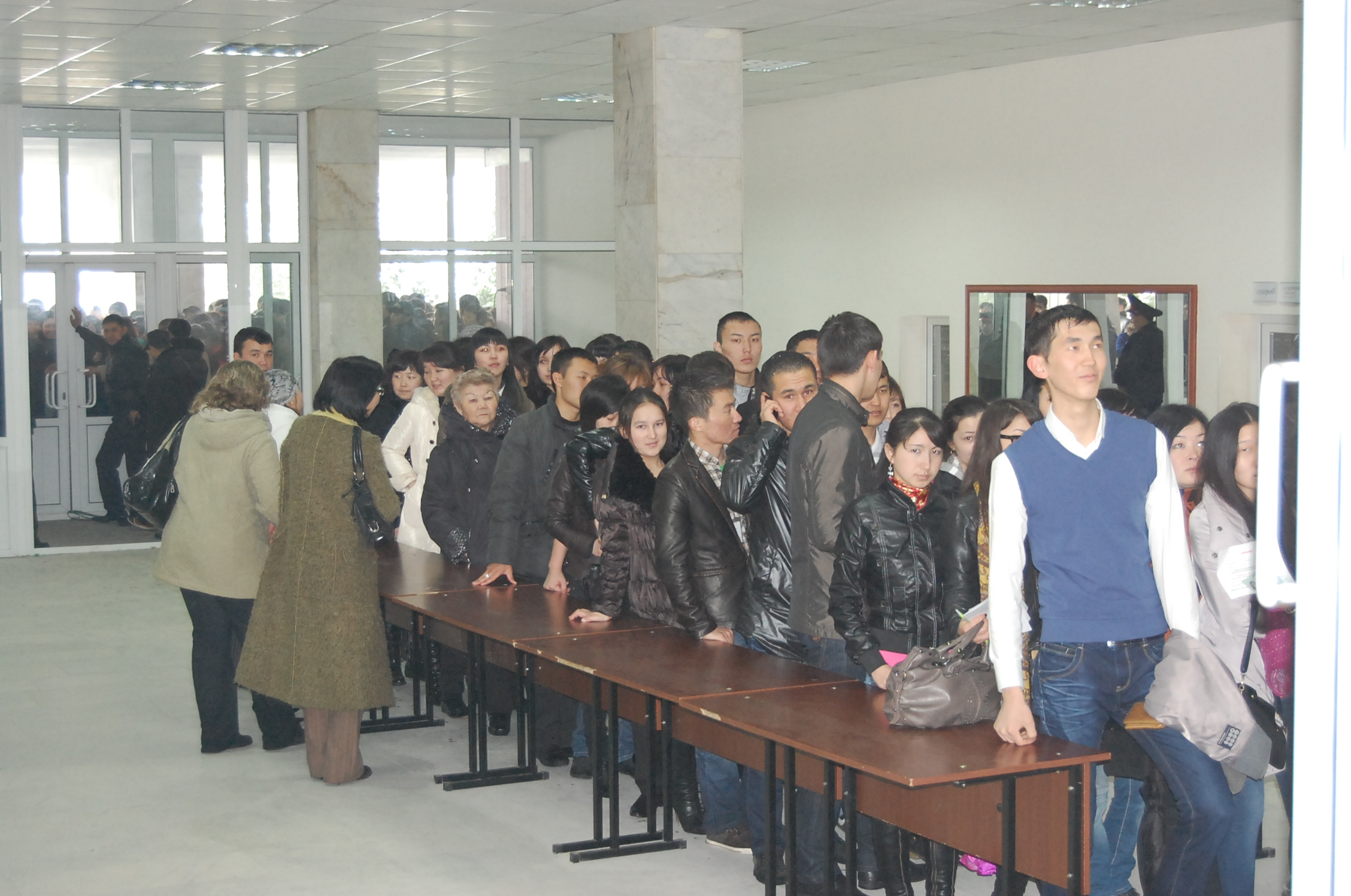
The queue at a polling station located in the campus of Al-Farabi Kazakh National University.

International monitors cited numerous cases of ballot box-stuffing, voter intimidation and a lack of transparency.

University students from the Al-Farabi Kazakh National University in Almaty have reportedly being pressured to vote or face expulsion, thus being seen queueing at early morning on Sunday in a drizzling weather.

The OSCE received multiple reports of people being pressured to vote, and government officials were seen intimidating voters in universities, hospitals and military encampments. Other kinds of reported violations include seemingly identical signatures on voter lists and numerous cases of ballot box-stuffing. The OSCE concluded that the vote count lacked transparency and that correct procedures were often disregarded.

== Results ==
The reported turnout of almost 90% was significantly up on the 76.8% turnout in the 2005 elections. Due to the low-key electoral campaign, this raised suspicions of election rigging.

Candidate	Party	Votes	%
Nursultan Nazarbayev	Nur Otan	7,850,958	95.55
Gani Qasymov	Party of Patriots of Kazakhstan	159,036	1.94
Jambyl Ahmetbekov	Communist People's Party	111,924	1.36
Mels Eleusizov	Tabighat	94,452	1.15
Total		8,216,370	100.00
Valid votes		8,216,370	99.24
Invalid/blank votes		62,857	0.76
Total votes		8,279,227	100.00
Registered voters/turnout		9,200,298	89.99
Source: CEC

== Reactions ==
The OSCE complained about a lack of transparency and competition in the vote. Janez Lenarcic, director of the OSCE's Office for Democratic Institutions and Human Rights, said Kazakhstan will need to work before the 2012 parliamentary election to improve its election laws and strengthen media freedoms and the right to free assembly. Daan Everts, head of the OSCE election observation mission, said that the election revealed shortcomings similar to those seen in previous ones and “could and should have been better.”: “We have regrettably to conclude that the elections were not as good as we hoped and expected,” The statement was endorsed by the American embassy in Astana.
