= 100 Concrete Steps =

The 100 Concrete Steps (Kazakh: 100 нақты қадам, romanized: 100 naqty qadam; Russian: 100 конкретных шагов, romanized: 100 konkretnykh shagov) is a national plan announced in May 2015 by President Nursultan Nazarbayev. The initiative outlines a set of 100 measures aimed at modernizing state governance, strengthening the rule of law, ensuring economic growth, fostering national identity, and improving transparency in government institutions.

The plan was introduced following Nazarbayev's re-election in 2015 and was positioned as a roadmap for implementing five institutional reforms to achieve its ambition of joining the top 30 developed countries by 2050.

== Background ==
In March 2015, President Nursultan Nazarbayev, during his nomination as the Nur Otan candidate for the 2015 presidential election, presented a vision for strengthening Kazakhstan's statehood in a changing global environment. He proposed five institutional reforms: modernizing the civil service, strengthening the rule of law, promoting industrialization and economic diversification, building a united "Nation of a Common Future", and ensuring a transparent and accountable government. To oversee the implementation of these reforms, Nazarbayev proposed the establishment of the National Commission for Modernization under the President.

During his inauguration in April 2015, Nazarbayev announced that he would shortly present the 100 Concrete Steps plan, designed to address domestic and global challenges and to guide Kazakhstan toward joining the world's 30 most developed countries, with implementation of the reforms as the nation's principal task for the next 10 to 15 years. On 6 May 2015, at the first governmental meeting of the newly formed National Commission for Modernization, he formally presented the program, outlining a roadmap to implement his five institutional reforms and strengthen Kazakhstan's statehood.

The full detailed document of the programme, titled Plan of the Nation – 100 Concrete Steps to Implement Five Institutional Reforms (Kazakh: Ұлт жоспары – бес институционалдық реформаны жүзеге асыру жөніндегі 100 нақты қадам, romanized: Ūlt jospary – bes institutsionaldyq reformany jüzege asyru jönındegı 100 naqty qadam; Russian: План Нации – 100 конкретных шагов по реализации пяти институциональных реформ, romanized: Plan Natsii – 100 konkretnykh shagov po realizatsii pyati institutsional'nykh reform), was publicly published on 20 May 2015 in Kazakh newspapers. Shortly after its publication, on 22 May at the 7th Astana International Forum, Nazarbayev addressed the plan as a roadmap for implementing the five institutional reforms, strengthening statehood, and guiding Kazakhstan toward sustainable development and entry into the world's 30 most developed countries.

== Content ==
The 100 Concrete Steps national plan is organized around five key reforms, each broken down into specific steps.

"100 Concrete Steps" National Plan
Institutional reforms		Key measures	Steps
1	Development of professional civil service Кәсіби мемлекеттік аппарат құру (Kazakh); Формирование профессионального государственного аппарата (Russian)	Centralization of civil service recruitment through the Agency for Civil Service Affairs and Anti-Corruption.; Introduction of a three-tier selection system for civil servants.; Mandatory probationary periods and performance-based salary increases.; Allowing the hiring of foreign specialists in state bodies.; Implementation of a new Code of Ethics and regular training for civil servants.; Strengthening anti-corruption measures.; Adoption of a new Law on Civil Service.; Conducting comprehensive attestation of current civil servants.	15
2	Ensuring the rule of law Заңның үстемдігін қамтамасыз ету (Kazakh); Обеспечение верховенства закона (Russian)	Establishment of specialized courts for investment disputes.; Creation of an investment chamber at the Supreme Court to handle disputes involving large investors.; Introduction of a three-tier judicial system.; Establishment of the Supreme Judicial Council as an autonomous public institution.; Reform of the prosecutor's office to enhance its independence.; Implementation of measures to combat corruption within the judiciary.	19
3	Industrialization and economic growth Индустрияландыру және экономикалық өсім (Kazakh); Индустриализация и экономический рост (Russian)	Development of a new industrialization strategy.; Creation of a single window for investors to access public services.; Improvement of infrastructure to support industrial development.; Enhancement of the financial sector to support entrepreneurship.; Development of human capital to meet the needs of a modern economy.; Implementation of measures to improve the investment climate.; Promotion of innovation and technological development.; Support for small and medium-sized enterprises.; Development of a new tax policy to stimulate economic growth.; Enhancement of trade and economic relations with other countries.	50
4	Identity and unity Біртектілік пен бірлік (Kazakh); Идентичность и единство (Russian)	Promotion of the Kazakh language and culture.; Enhancement of the role of the Assembly of People of Kazakhstan.; Implementation of measures to combat extremism and intolerance.; Promotion of interfaith and interethnic dialogue.; Protection of the rights of national minorities.; Development of a new national identity concept	6
5	Establishing an accountable state Есеп беретін мемлекетті қалыптастыру (Kazakh); Формирование подотчетного государства (Russian)	Implementation of a new public procurement system.; Enhancement of the budget process to ensure efficiency and accountability.; Development of a new system for public service delivery.; Implementation of measures to combat corruption in public administration.; Enhancement of citizen participation in decision-making processes.; Development of a new system for monitoring and evaluation of government programs.; Implementation of measures to improve the efficiency of state-owned enterprises.; Enhancement of the role of the media in holding the government accountable.; Development of a new system for public financial management.; Implementation of measures to improve the efficiency of the judiciary.	10

Each of the 100 steps was designed as a phased measure, to be implemented in stages over several years.

== Implementation ==
The 100 Concrete Steps was implemented under the supervision of the National Modernization Commission under the President of the Republic of Kazakhstan, which coordinated five working groups of national and foreign experts. The Commission guided the step-by-step execution of the five institutional reforms, monitored progress by ministers and regional governors, and ensured proposals were approved by the President and turned into legislation. An International Consultative Council of foreign experts provided recommendations and independently evaluated the implementation of the reforms.

The program was overseen by the government of Kazakhstan, with regular reporting on progress. Implementation was planned in two stages: institutional foundations (2015–2016) and comprehensive modernization (2016 onwards). Some measures were incorporated into long-term state development strategies, including Kazakhstan 2050 and Nurly Zhol.

In the State of the Nation Address on 10 January 2018, President Nazarbayev reported that 60 of the 100 steps had been implemented, with the remaining steps primarily focusing on long-term objectives.

After Nazarbayev's resignation in 2019, President Kassym-Jomart Tokayev continued the implementation of the 100 Concrete Steps by explicitly referencing it in his 9 March 2020 decree approving Kazakhstan's Foreign Policy Concept for 2020–2030, ensuring that the program remained a guiding framework for the nation's foreign policy and long-term development. In his 2020 State of the Nation Address, Tokayev emphasized accelerating and completing the program.

As of late 2021, Prime Minister Asqar Mamin reported 76 of the 100 steps of the programme, had been implemented across the five reform areas, with continued work planned in healthcare, education, investment, energy, digitalization, and other priority sectors.

== Reception ==
Supporters of the plan described it as a response to challenges facing Kazakhstan's political and economic system, intended to strengthen resilience in the context of global crises. Israeli economist Jacob A. Frenkel compared the implementation of the 100 Concrete Steps national plan to the Apollo 11 moon landing, stating that "these will be giant leaps for Kazakhstan." Russian politician and businessman German Gref described the plan as "a document that can change the country", emphasizing that Russia should implement similar measures as part of its own crisis response.

== See also ==
- Politics of Kazakhstan
- Nurly Zhol
- Kazakhstan 2050
