= Astana International Financial Centre =

Financial hub in Astana, Kazakhstan

Coordinates: 51°05′28.5″N 71°24′46.1″E

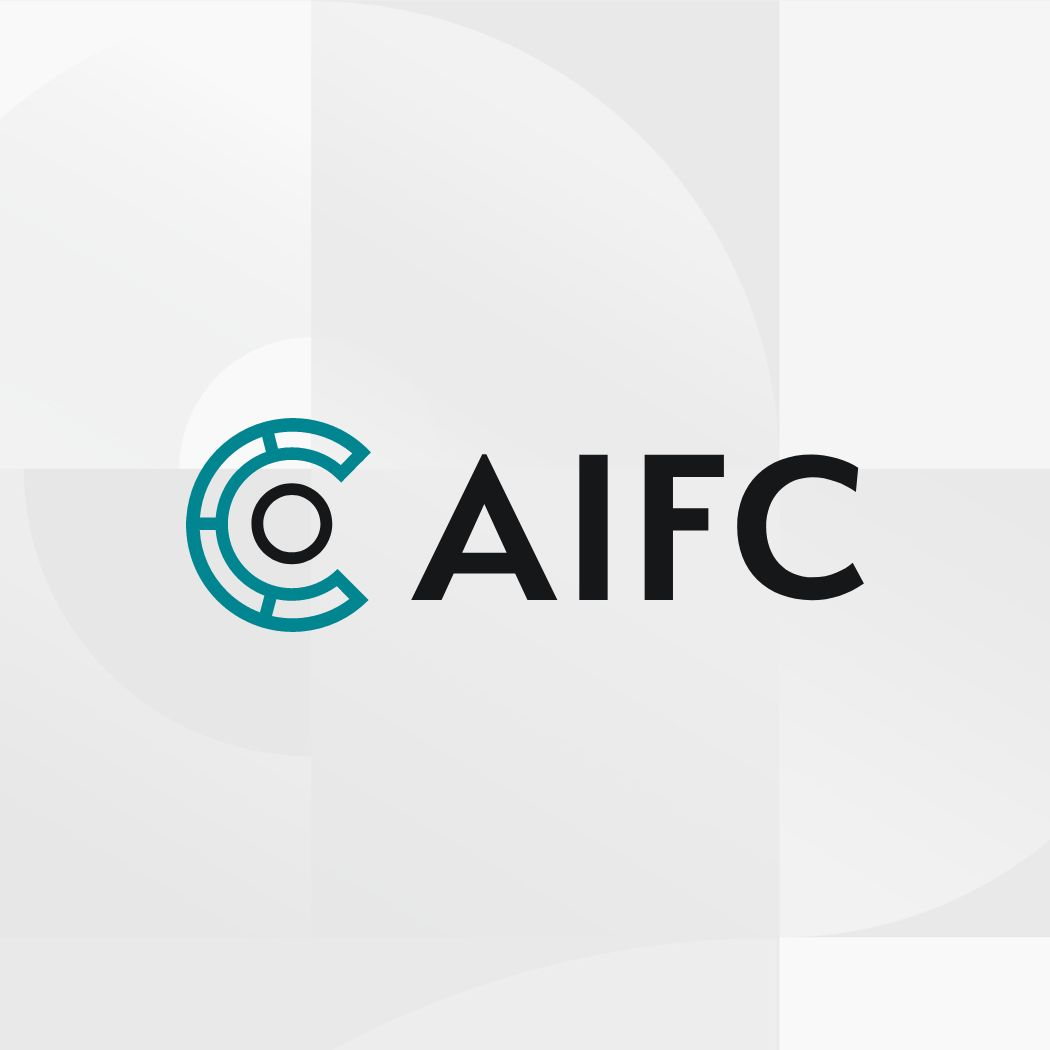
- Industry: Financial services
- Founded: 2018
- Headquarters: Astana, Kazakhstan
- Key people: Renat Bekturov (Governor)
- Website: http://www.aifc.kz/

The Astana International Financial Centre (AIFC) is a financial hub in Astana, Kazakhstan that officially launched on July 5, 2018.

The Constitutional Statute "On the Astana International Financial Centre" approved on 7 December 2015 provides a legal framework for the functioning of the AIFC as well as a favorable environment for its participants.

== History ==
Nursultan Nazarbayev announced the "100 Concrete Steps" Plan of the Nation to implement the five institutional reforms, designed to provide a strong national platform needed to achieve country's ambition of joining the top 30 developed countries by 2050. As part of the Plan of the Nation, the AIFC was established with a special legal status to be based on the EXPO-2017 International Specialized Exhibition infrastructure.

The AIFC was officially launched on 5 July 2018 at the EXPO Congress Centre during the Astana Finance Days conference. The ceremony was timed to coincide with the 20th anniversary of Astana as the capital. Along with Nursultan Nazarbayev, the heads of state of Central Asia attended the opening. In his speech, Nazarbayev said that Astana should become the main financial hub of Central Asia and, in the longer term, one of the leading financial centres in Asia. Nazarbayev also announced that the AIFC exchange (AIX), set up with the participation of Nasdaq and the Shanghai Stock Exchange, had begun operating the day before.

The Astana International Financial Centre is a part of the Belt and Road Initiative's financial infrastructure, with the aim to increase financial connectivity among Central Asia, China, Russia, and the Arab world.

As of June 2025, over 4000 companies are registered with AIFC, including financial firms, global service providers, cryptocurrency exchanges, venture capital companies and regional development banks. Prominent firms such as KPMG, EY, PwC, Deloitte, Binance, Bybit, Most Ventures, Amicorp, China Construction Bank Corporation, and China Development Bank are part of the AIFC's ecosystem.

== AIFC bodies ==
=== AIFC Management Council ===
It is a supreme authority that includes high-profile leaders of global financial corporations and is chaired by the President of Kazakhstan. The main objectives of the Management Council include the determination of the strategic directions for the AIFC development and the assistance in the development of the favorable conditions for the formation of a leading financial centre. AIFC Development strategy was determined by the Management Council during its first meeting on 26 May 2016.

=== AIFC Authority ===
The AIFC Authority was established on 28 December 2015 and is responsible for the promotion of the AIFC in the global markets and the attraction of the potential participants to the AIFC.

=== Astana International Exchange (AIX) ===
The Astana International Exchange (AIX) was established in 2017 as part of the AIFC. AIX was created to develop the public equity and debt capital markets in Kazakhstan and Central Asian region. AIX is regulated by the Astana Financial Services Authority, an independent regulator established within the AIFC. AIX shareholders include the AIFC, Goldman Sachs GS, the Shanghai stock exchange, and China's Silk Road Fund. Nasdaq NDAQ is behind the AIX trading platform.

=== Astana Financial Services Authority (AFSA) ===
An independent regulator of the AIFC that was established under the Constitutional Statute of the Republic of Kazakhstan "On the Astana International Financial Centre" to regulate financial services and related activities in the AIFC.

The AFSA's purpose is to facilitate business by maintaining the safety and robustness of the AIFC financial system, ensuring that financial markets in the AIFC are fair, efficient, and transparent. The AFSA's regulatory remit includes financial and market services in banking, insurance, capital markets, Islamic finance, fintech, as well as ancillary services.

=== AIFC Court and International Arbitration Centre ===
Similar to International Commercial Courts in Dubai, Qatar and Singapore, the AIFC Court provides a common law court system for the resolution of civil and commercial disputes within the AIFC. It exclusively oversees all legal matters stemming from the AIFC and its activities, as well as other disputes where all involved parties expressly consent in writing to the jurisdiction of the AIFC Court. Inside Kazakhstan, the establishment of a common law court in a civil law system has provoked fierce criticism. The International Arbitration Centre, on the other hand, offers an alternative to court litigation and offers arbitration, mediation, and other dispute resolution methods. It shall review disputes which the parties have agreed shall be settled by arbitration. The opening ceremony of the AIFC International Arbitration Centre (IAC) was held in July 2019 during the Astana Finance Days conference in Astana.

=== AIFC Academy ===
The AIFC Academy provides specialized training and certification programs in finance, business, and international law. Additionally, the academy enhances professional skills through various initiatives and collaborates with universities both domestically and internationally to foster continuous learning and develop a highly skilled workforce for the AIFC ecosystem and beyond.

=== Language ===
English is the official language on the AIFC territory.

== Priority Sectors ==
=== Equities Trading ===
The AIFC has partnered with NASDAQ and the Shanghai Stock Exchange. The AIFC is the shareholder of the Astana International Exchange (AIX) that was established in 2017. AIX's first trading session was held on November 14, 2018, coinciding with the 25th anniversary of tenge, the national currency of Kazakhstan. The session was opened by Nursultan Nazarbayev.

As of 2024 the AIFC has successfully attracted more than $16.9 billion to the Kazakh economy.

=== Green Technology ===
The AIFC provides structural framework for the advancement of green finance. To that end, the centre launched the AIFC Green Finance Centre to develop and promote green finance in Kazakhstan and neighboring countries.

In 2023, GFC verified around 60% of green bonds and loans in Kazakhstan, demonstrating its significant influence in the broader Central Asian region. GFC is the only company in Central Asia accredited by the International Capital Markets Association (ICMA) and the Climate Bonds Initiative.

=== AFSA FinTech Lab ===
FinTech Lab allows:

- Firms licensed in foreign jurisdictions to test the regional markets with minimum resources and presence in AIFC.
- Start-up firms to provide activities regulated in the AIFC by gradually complying with regulatory requirements.
- Both incumbent and start-up firms to test new products and technologies in live environment with real clients.

=== Islamic Finance ===
The AIFC provides legal framework for Islamic Finance, including Islamic Banking Business and other activities carried out in accordance with the principles of Shari'ah.

In February 2024, the AIFC expanded the list of financial services which its resident companies can provide to clients in Kazakhstan. Now Islamic finance services can be provided to individuals and legal entities in any currency not only by Islamic banks and Islamic insurance companies, but also by Islamic financial institutions for consumer finance, installment financing, Islamic leasing, trade finance.

To attract companies to AIFC, the minimum authorised capital requirements for Islamic banks and financial organisations have been reduced until May 2026. Additionally, financial companies licensed by the AIFC regulator are exempt from paying CIT and VAT, including Islamic banking, non-banking, Islamic insurance, and reinsurance companies.

The AIFC's initiatives aimed at the development and promotion of the Islamic finance industry have allowed Kazakhstan to enter the prestigious global rankings in this area. According to the Global Islamic Finance Report (GIFR), in 2022 Kazakhstan ranked 18th in the index, ahead of countries such as the UK, the US, Singapore, China, as well as 14th position in the Global Report on the Islamic Economy (GIEI) index. Currently in the AIFC are registered several companies which provide services in the field of Islamic banking and financing, consulting in the field of Shari'ah and Islamic fintech (Al Saqr Islamic Bank, Alif Islamic Bank, Kazakhstan Islamic Finance Company, etc.).

=== Asset management ===
The AIFC has created a legal framework for asset management in various formats. Asset management includes, among other things, collective investment management, investment management, fund management support, investment advisory services, investment transaction management, and management of multilateral and organised trading platforms.

This sector demonstrates rapid growth. The volume of assets under management (AUM) in the AIFC increased by 82% from US$585 million at the beginning of 2023 to US$1 billion at the end of the same year. The number of registered funds increased in 2023 from 20 to 37. The volume of investment funds' assets under management amounted to US$616 million.
