= Bolashak =

Kazakh scholarship

Logo of the Bolashak scholarship

Bolashak (Kazakh: Болашақ, meaning "future") is an international scholarship of the President of Kazakhstan that funds Kazakh citizens to study at leading foreign universities and to complete internships abroad. It was established on 5 November 1993 on the initiative of Kazakhstan's first president, Nursultan Nazarbayev. The scholarship covers tuition and living costs; in return, graduates must come back to Kazakhstan and work there for a set period. Over 30 years the programme trained more than 12,600 specialists.

== History ==
=== Establishment ===
The programme was established by President Nursultan Nazarbayev's Resolution No. 1394 of 5 November 1993. The decision was taken at the height of an economic crisis, when the state lacked money for pensions, salaries and heating, and many considered sending young people to study abroad a waste. Nazarbayev nevertheless bet on developing the country's intellectual potential: after the collapse of the Soviet Union, Kazakhstan lacked its own specialists in diplomacy, public administration and modern medicine. A Republican Commission for Training Personnel Abroad was set up by a Cabinet of Ministers resolution of 13 December 1993 to select scholarship holders.

The first 187 scholarship holders left to study in 1994. Until 1997 the scholarships went mainly to graduates of economics and humanities faculties, and students studied in only four countries: the United States, the United Kingdom, Germany and France. In 1997 the programme was revised to support the goals of the Kazakhstan-2030 strategy, and from 2000 engineers and technical specialists could compete without the requirement of fluency in a foreign language. Between 1994 and 2004, 785 people received the scholarship and studied in 13 countries.

=== Expansion ===
In 2005, in his address to the people of Kazakhstan, Nazarbayev set the goal of sending 3,000 young Kazakhs a year to leading universities around the world, and the programme was refocused on industrial and innovative development. To administer it, the government created the state-owned joint-stock company Center for International Programs by a resolution of 4 April 2005. Between 2005 and 2013, 10,117 people received scholarships to study at top-200 universities in 30 countries.

The programme's terms changed several times during these years:

- 2008: quotas were introduced for rural youth and civil servants, and research internships were launched for teachers and scientists;
- 2011: bachelor's scholarships were abolished, and the programme focused on master's, doctoral and internship programmes;
- 2012: internships were opened to medical, engineering, technical and teaching staff;
- 2014: foreign and Kazakh language requirements were raised, and culture and media professionals became eligible.

On 29 November 2013 Nazarbayev attended the anniversary forum of scholarship holders marking the programme's 20th anniversary.

=== Recent developments ===
Events marking the programme's 30th anniversary were held in Astana in late 2023. On 30 November a forum titled "BOLASHAK: Strategic Partnership and Cooperation" brought together ambassadors of 19 countries and the heads of more than 50 foreign universities, and on 8 December a ceremonial alumni forum took place.

By the programme's 30th anniversary, 12,605 specialists had completed it: 6,958 earned a master's degree, 2,626 a bachelor's degree, 2,537 completed internships and more than 200 earned a PhD. According to the Center for International Programs, 55% of graduates studied the humanities, 36% technical subjects and 7% medicine. Graduates make up a notable part of the country's management elite: more than half hold middle or senior management positions, and over 10% have founded their own businesses. Alumni are united in the Bolashak Association of scholarship holders.

The programme was substantially reformed in 2026. The share of scholarships in natural sciences and engineering rose to 69.6%, the list of universities was limited to the top 100 of the QS subject rankings, and selection became a two-stage process. Bachelor's scholarships returned, but only for prize-winners of international olympiads and science competitions. Graduates may now fulfil their work obligation not only in Kazakhstan but also at international and regional organisations such as the UN, OSCE and SCO. In 2026, 635 scholarships were allocated: 20 for bachelor's, 400 for master's and 50 for doctoral studies, and 165 for internships. Separate quotas were also introduced for training specialists in artificial intelligence and nuclear energy.

== Eligibility and terms ==
The scholarship is open to Kazakh citizens entering master's, doctoral or residency programmes, or sent on internships by their employers; since 2026 it is also open to international olympiad prize-winners entering bachelor's programmes. Applicants must hold an unconditional offer from a university on the approved list, a KAZTEST certificate at level B1 or higher, and proof of foreign language proficiency. Candidates take a test and an interview with an independent expert panel. The final decision is made by the Republican Commission for Training Personnel Abroad.

Scholarship holders sign a contract and pledge real estate, their own or their relatives', covering the cost of study as security. The pledge is released once they have completed their work obligation, which used to range from three to five years depending on the place of work. A deferral may be granted for valid reasons; if a graduate refuses to fulfil the obligation, the pledged property is sold to recover the state's costs.

Study is permitted only at universities on an annually approved list; in 2023 it included 236 universities in 27 countries.

== Criticism ==
Educating one scholarship holder costs the budget about 10 million tenge a year on average; around 1% of graduates (about 180 people) have lost their scholarship and must repay the funds spent on them.

In 2013 the head of Kazcosmos, Talgat Musabayev, said he preferred graduates of Russian universities because many Bolashak graduates were insufficiently trained. In 2023 Senator Andrey Lukin reported thousands of violations in the programme and pointed to the lack of effective control over graduates' work obligations and the repayment of budget funds.

In April 2026, at a government hour in the Mazhilis, Tlegen Kaskin, a member of the Supreme Audit Chamber, said that scholarships worth 7.7 billion tenge had been awarded to people who did not meet the requirements. At the same session, MP Bakytzhan Bazarbek claimed that relatives of influential people may be studying under the programme, at a cost of about 10 billion tenge.
