= Civil service in Kazakhstan =

The civil service in Kazakhstan is the role of civil servants in public agencies, which is aimed at realization of objectives and functions of the state. A civil servant in Kazakhstan is a citizen of Kazakhstan who has a public position in the state agency, executing official duties in order to implement tasks and functions of the state. His/her salary is paid by republican, local budget, or from the means of the National Bank of Kazakhstan.

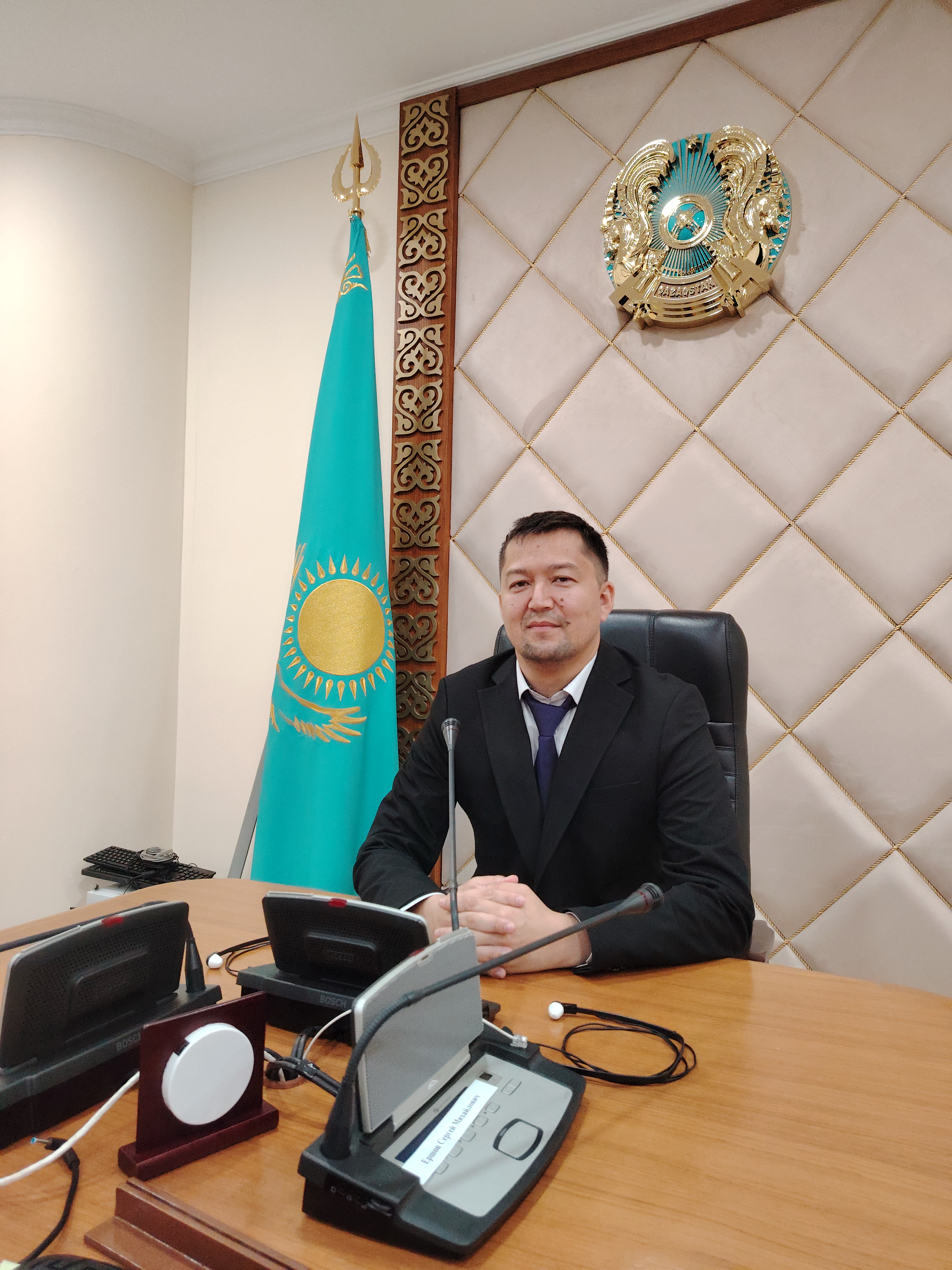
Ordinary civil servant of central state body of Kazakhstan

== Principles ==
The Civil service in Kazakhstan is based on the following Principles: There are few major principles categorized by their meanings. In fact, there are 20 principles stated in the Law on Civil Service of Kazakhstan.

1. Priority of rights, freedom, and legitimate interests of citizens in front of the interests of the state. For instance, all citizens have equal rights to access civil service. Application to civil service is voluntary. Civil service takes into account public opinion and publicity, excluding activities with state secrets.
2. The unity of the civil service system. In other words, all three branches of the state power – legislative, executive, and judicial powers – are united and interdependent between each other.
3. Transparency and effectiveness of the activities of public bodies. Compulsory execution of particular decisions by subordinate public bodies and civil servants. Subordinate public agencies and their civil servants are accountable for their performances. All public agencies are accountable in front of people.
4. The principle of meritocracy. It is fair award and promotion of civil servants for their merits and achievements, for exemplary performance of official duties and unblemished public service. They have equal remuneration for the performance of equivalent work.
5. The principle of professionalism of civil servants. Civil servants are considered as Kazakhstani patriots and intolerant to violations. They are personally responsible for improper performance of their official duties. Also they have to know and keep rules of ethics during their duties.
6. Training of civil servants. Civil servants have legal and social protection. In addition, they have an opportunity for training, retraining and development of necessary competencies.

== Classification of civil servants ==
There are two types of civil servants in Kazakhstan: administrative and political civil servants. Administrative civil servants have two groups: corps A and corps B. Corps A – administrative public positions of managerial level. There is a special procedure of the selection into the personnel reserve, competitive selection, continuation and termination of civil service, as well as special eligibility requirements for this corps. Special eligibility requirements include the level of education, work experience, and competencies. Competencies consider the knowledge and skills necessary for professional performance. Corps B – administrative public positions that are not included in corps A. Official positions held in this corps are lower than those in corps A.

The difference between political and administrative civil servants: Political civil servant is a civil servant whose appointment (election), termination and performance carrying out political character and responsibility for implementation of political tasks and goals. There are categories (A, B, C, D, E) for administrative civil servants in regard to their positions, while categories for political civil servants are not established.

== General preconditions ==
There are specific requirements that have to be met by a candidate who tends to be a civil servant. These preconditions are illustrated by the major categories:

1. Citizenship: Kazakhstan
2. Age: 18 years old and above, but below the age of retirement. However, the latter limitation is not valid for political public positions.
3. Testing: Evaluation of professional and personal qualities of candidates.
4. Education: It depends on the level of public position and the level of state agency.
5. Health condition: it depends on the duty of the positions and performance of the state agency, to which candidate wants to join.

There are major limitations, within which a candidate cannot become a civil servant (Article 16, point 3):

1. being recognized as incapable or partially capable by the court;
2. having a disease that prevents the performance of official duties;
3. having disciplinary offenses in the last three years;
4. having corruption, and criminal offenses imposed by a court;
5. having a criminal record that is not withdrawn at the time of admission to the civil service;
6. being previously convicted for a crime on the basis of certain Articles of the Criminal Procedure Code of Kazakhstan;
7. committed a crime as a part of criminal group;
8. being previously fired due to negative motives from the military service, special public bodies, courts, and law enforcement bodies.

Moreover, there is a special audit conducted by the authorities of national security in accordance with the Law during three months. There is no way for discrimination in regard to origin, social, official, and property status, sex, race, nationality, language, religion, place of residence, and any other circumstances.

== Requirements to stay in civil service ==
- to follow a regime of working hours: 5 days a week;
- to pass an assessment of their activities conducted by authorized body; the results of an assessment are the basis for making decisions whether to pay bonuses, to train, rotate, to demote, or to dismiss a civil servant;
- to pass training and re-training that can be required for a civil servant to take;
- to follow the orders and official duties;
- to keep professional ethics;

An administrative civil servant has to take an attestation every three years in order to continue the work in civil service. Attestation is conducted by the attestation committee consisting of at least five people with its chairman. This committee can decide whether to let a civil servant to stay, to promote or to fire him/her depending on the results of evaluation.

== Release of civil servants ==
The main reasons that can lead to dismissal or loss of a civil servant's status: For a political civil servant:

- loss of citizenship of the Republic of Kazakhstan;
- liquidation of public body in which he/she works;
- a case when he/she provided a false information about income and property belonging to him/her; about personal documents;
- in a case of corruption offenses; disciplinary offense for the fifth time;
- violation of duties and restrictions, established by the laws of Kazakhstan;
- a case of reaching the retirement age;

For an administrative civil servant:

- a case of reaching the retirement age;
- a change from administrative to the political public position;
- a case when he/she provided a false information about income and property belonging to him/her; about personal documents;
- violation of duties and restrictions, established by the laws of Kazakhstan;
- the loss of citizenship of the Republic of Kazakhstan;
- in a case of corruption offenses; disciplinary offense for the fifth time;
- negative results of the attestation;

== Structure of civil service ==
The structure of the civil service system in Kazakhstan is illustrated by the positions of public bodies – implementers of public policy. Generally, the state power consists of legislative, executive and judicial powers. Civil servants function within all three parts of the state power and can be rotated within it if one has necessary qualifications (education, experience) for that.

Thus, legislative power is carried out by the Parliament; executive power is carried out by the Government; and judicial power is carried out by the Supreme Court (The Constitution, Chapter 6, Article 75). The Administration of the President is able to control and give orders to the Supreme Court, the General Prosecutor's Office, the Committee of National Security, the National Bank, the Government and other executive public bodies under the Government. However, the only source of the state power is People (The Constitution, Chapter 1, Article 3). Generally, these four major public bodies illustrated below construct the system of civil service in Kazakhstan.

== Main Rights, Duties, and Restrictions of Civil Servants ==
Major rights of civil servants:

- to have legal and social protection;
- to have protection of labor and health;
- to have safety and necessary labor conditions;
- to have pension and social security;
- to have trainings, re-trainings financed by the National Bank;
- to get merit-based rewards;
- other rights in regard to civil service procedure

Major duties of civil servants:

- to respect and follow the Constitution and Laws of the Republic of Kazakhstan;
- to take a civil servant oath;
- to ensure respect for and protection of rights, freedom, and legitimate interests of citizens and legal entities; to take necessary measures on their appeals;
- to ensure information security during the work with information resources of any public body;
- to follow the orders, decisions, and instructions of the higher officials within their official duties;
- to follow professional ethics;
- to follow the restrictions imposed by the Laws

Major restrictions of civil servants:

- to be a member of the representative body;
- to engage in other paid activities, except for teaching, scientific and other creative performance;
- to use the means of logistic, financial, and information support of his/her official duties, any other state properties and official information for non-official purposes;
- to participate in actions, including strikes, that prevent normal functioning of public bodies;
- to hold a public position, which is in direct subordinate to the position held by his/her close relatives (parent), children, adoptive children and parents, spouse, except for cases provided by the legislation of the Republic of Kazakhstan;
- to work overtime during weekends, public holidays in cases of immediate affairs in accordance with the Labor law; can be compensated later by giving days off;
- presentation of the declaration on income and property, belonging to a civil servant and his/her spouse to the state agency.

== Notable Reforms in Civil Service ==
Generally, reforms in civil service of Kazakhstan can be divided into three main phases:

=== Period from 1990 to 2011 ===
In 1997 the President introduced the development program of Kazakhstan – 2030 during the President's Address to the people of Kazakhstan. Strategy of "Kazakhstan-2030: Prosperity, security and improved living standards for all Kazakhs". One of the long-term goals of this program was to produce a professional state. In other words, the content of the civil service system was affected as a driving force of administrative reform. According to Knox, who studied reforms of civil service in Kazakhstan, this program introduced the following goals of administrative reforms: “1. To increase the effectiveness of the government working collectively as a state organ and individually through the role of each minister; 2. to implement modern information technology and eliminate bureaucracy in government bodies. 3. to create an effective and optimal structure of state bodies. 4. to restrict state interventions in the economy”. In addition, in 2007 the President of Kazakhstan signed a Decree entitled “Measures aimed at Modernizing the Public Administration System in the Republic of Kazakhstan”. This Decree proposed to enhance civil service, professional skills and efficiency of public bodies, and the quality of administration procedures.

=== Period from 2011 to 2015 ===
The next substantial change was adopted through the Code of Honor of Civil Servants in 2011. Issue of ethics was considered as one of the main needs to adopt in civil service at that time. The rules of civil servants’ ethics is an official document that determines the behavior of workers. It touches upon not only their official duties, but also activities outside of their official performance. Two years later in 2013 another changes were introduced by the Chairman of the Agency for Civil Service Affairs of the Republic of Kazakhstan – Alikhan Baimenov's initiative. In particular, the Law “On amendments and additions to some legislative acts of the Civil Service” came into effect. This amendments brought the principle of meritocracy – the selection and promotion of the personnel basing on their professional advancement and merits.

=== Period from 2015 till present ===
In May 2015, President Nazarbayev introduced “Plan of the Nation – 100 Concrete Steps of Implementation of Five Institutional Reforms of the Head of State”, which affected the civil service too. The purpose of this plan is to accept the global internal challenges and to enter the top-30 most developed countries in the world. One of the five institutional reforms is “formation of contemporary state apparatus”, which is directly about civil service system of Kazakhstan. This chapter includes 15 innovations or steps (out of 100 steps of the plan) in civil service. In fact it covers all aspects that were introduced in the previous phases (Reference: Plan of the nation, Chapter 1):

1. Admission to the civil service must begin from the lower positions.
2. Selection of candidates to lower positions and further career promotion must be implemented on the basis of the competence approach.
3. Centralization of the selection procedure of the applicants joining the civil service for the first time. It should be implemented through the strengthening the role of the Ministry of Civil Service Affairs of the Republic of Kazakhstan. Introduction of the three-tier selection system.
4. Mandatory probationary period for new employees in the civil service according to the formula 3+3 (evaluation of appropriateness in three months and six months respectively.
5. Increase of the salary of civil servants depending on their performance results.
6. Transition to the payment according to results: for civil servants, public bodies, ministries and akims, members of the Government.
7. Introduction of the regional correction indicators to the basic salary of civil servants.
8. Mandatory provision of on-duty accommodation without the right for privatization for rotated civil servants for the period of performance of official duties.
9. Legislative consolidation of the system of regular training for civil servants at least once every three years.
10. Transition to the competitive selection for career promotion of civil servants. Strengthening the principle of meritocracy.
11. Allowance of foreign managers, individual specialists from private sector and citizens of the Republic of Kazakhstan – employees of the international organizations to the work of civil service. Their appointment can be implemented by specific requirements and separate list of positions. This step makes civil service open and competitive system.
12. Introduction of new ethical rules. Design of new Code of ethics of civil service. Introduction of the position responsible for the issues of ethics.
13. Strengthening the fight against corruption, including the development of new legislation. Creation of specialized department for systematic prevention of corruption offenses.
14. Adoption of new Law on civil service
15. Conduction of a comprehensive attestation of the current civil servants after the adoption of new law on civil service.
