= Kazakhstan 2050 =

Long-term development strategy of Kazakhstan

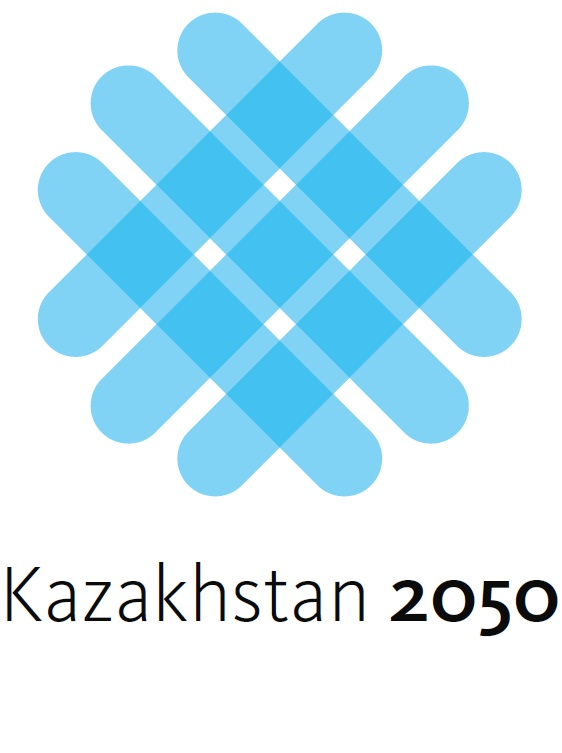
Logo of the Kazakhstan-2050 Strategy.

Kazakhstan 2050 (Kazakh: Қазақстан-2050), full name "Kazakhstan 2050" Strategy: New Political Course of the Established State («Қазақстан-2050» стратегиясы: қалыптасқан мемлекеттің жаңа саяси бағыты), is a long-term development strategy of Kazakhstan through 2050. It was presented by President Nursultan Nazarbayev in his annual address to the people of Kazakhstan on 14 December 2012. The strategy replaced the earlier "Kazakhstan 2030" strategy. Its main goal is for Kazakhstan to join the 30 most developed countries in the world by 2050.

== History ==
The strategy was announced on 14 December 2012 in Astana in the president's annual address to the people of Kazakhstan. In the same address, Nursultan Nazarbayev reviewed the results of the "Kazakhstan 2030" strategy; according to him, many of its provisions had been fulfilled ahead of schedule.

On 18 December 2012, Presidential Decree No. 449 approved a Nationwide Action Plan for implementing the address. Among other things, the government was instructed to develop a Concept for Kazakhstan's entry into the 30 most developed countries of the world. The week after the address, Astana hosted an international conference titled "Strategy Kazakhstan-2050: Prospective Domestic and Foreign Agenda".

== Content ==
The address consists of three parts: a review of the country's development since independence and of the implementation of the "Kazakhstan-2030" strategy; an analysis of ten global challenges of the 21st century; and a presentation of the new political course.

The goal of the strategy is formulated as follows: by 2050, to build a society of prosperity based on a strong state, a developed economy and opportunities for universal labour, and to join the 30 most developed countries of the world. The economic part of the strategy is built on the principle of "comprehensive economic pragmatism".

The strategy identified ten global challenges facing the country:

1. the acceleration of historical time;
2. global demographic imbalance;
3. the threat to global food security;
4. acute water shortage;
5. global energy security;
6. the exhaustibility of natural resources;
7. the third industrial revolution;
8. growing social instability;
9. the crisis of civilizational values;
10. the threat of a new global destabilization.

The new course comprised seven areas:

- Economic policy. Modernization of budget, tax and monetary policy and of the management of public and external debt and state assets; infrastructure development; a new natural resource management system; the next stage of industrialization; agricultural modernization; water resource policy.
- Support for entrepreneurship. Development of small and medium-sized businesses; a new model of public–private partnership based on the principle "strong business – strong state"; a new stage of privatization.
- Social policy. Minimum social standards, targeted social assistance, reduction of regional disparities, protection of motherhood and childhood, the health of the nation.
- Education and professional skills. Development of engineering education, modernization of teaching methods, a new innovation and research policy, technology transfer, national clusters.
- Public administration and democratization. Improvement of state planning; decentralization and delineation of powers between the centre and the regions; election of rural akims; a professional civil service; the fight against corruption; reform of law enforcement and the special services.
- Foreign policy. Economic and trade diplomacy, regional and global security, strengthening of defence capabilities.
- New Kazakhstani patriotism. Equality of citizens of all ethnic groups, culture and traditions, development of the Kazakh language and trilingualism, the role of religion.

The address also announced the transition of the Kazakh alphabet to the Latin script by 2025.

== Implementation ==
On 17 January 2014, in the address "Kazakhstan's Way – 2050: Common Aim, Common Interests, Common Future", Nazarbayev presented a plan for joining the 30 most developed countries. The indicators of OECD member states were named as the benchmark for the country. Targets for 2050 included a 4.5-fold increase in GDP per capita (from 13,000 to 60,000 US dollars), raising science funding to at least 3% of GDP, and halving the energy intensity of GDP.

On the same day, Decree No. 732 approved the Concept for Kazakhstan's entry into the 30 most developed countries of the world. The concept itself acknowledged the goal as extremely difficult: according to its authors, in the 20th century only Japan, Finland, Singapore and later South Korea had achieved this. On 30 June 2014, the government approved an action plan for implementing the concept for 2014–2020.

On 11 March 2015, Nazarbayev announced five institutional reforms. On 20 May 2015, the Plan of the Nation "100 Concrete Steps" for implementing them was published. The document described itself as "the plan of the nation for entering the top 30 developed countries". As of September 2019, 58 of the 100 steps had been completed and removed from monitoring.

The first medium-term document of the strategy was the Strategic Development Plan of the Republic of Kazakhstan until 2025, signed on 15 February 2018. It was drafted to implement the Kazakhstan 2050 strategy and launched the processes of the so-called "Third Modernization". Due to the consequences of the COVID-19 pandemic, the plan lost its relevance and was replaced by the National Development Plan of the country until 2025.

On 30 July 2024, Decree No. 611 of President Kassym-Jomart Tokayev approved the National Development Plan of the Republic of Kazakhstan until 2029.

== Assessments ==
In 2013, American analyst Richard Weitz (Central Asia Program, George Washington University) noted that in 2012 Kazakhstan ranked 51st in competitiveness, so the goal implied a significant leap. He identified the main economic problem as the low productivity and competitiveness of non-resource sectors, despite earlier attempts at diversification.

In 2020, Saltanat Janenova and Colin Knox, researchers at the Graduate School of Public Policy of Nazarbayev University, noted that Kazakhstan ranked 50th in the Human Development Index and described the scale of the task of joining the 30 most developed countries as enormous.
