= Kazakhstan National Fund =

Fund for oil revenue in the Republic of Kazakhstan

The National Fund of the Republic of Kazakhstan is a sovereign wealth fund created by the government of Kazakhstan in 2000 in order to manage oil revenue more effectively. Tax revenues from certain oil and gas companies accumulate this fund. The list of oil and gas companies updated by the government of Kazakhstan. Information about revenues and expenditures of the fund is provided by the central bank of Kazakhstan and by the Ministry of Finance of Kazakhstan.

== History ==
According to the recollections of Kazakhstan's first president, Nursultan Nazarbayev, the idea of creating a special state fund to accumulate revenue from natural resources was first discussed in 1997, during the drafting of the long-term development strategy "Kazakhstan-2030". At first, the proposal found little support among economists and government officials. After the 1998 financial crisis, the idea was revisited in 2000.

In designing the National Fund, Kazakhstan drew in particular on the experience of Norway, where oil revenue was accumulated in a special state fund. The new mechanism was intended to save part of the revenue from non-renewable natural resources for future generations and to keep public finances stable during unfavourable conditions on world commodity markets.

On 23 August 2000, President Nursultan Nazarbayev signed Decree No. 402 "On the National Fund of the Republic of Kazakhstan", which established the National Fund. Under the decree, the fund's main purposes were to ensure the country's stable socio-economic development, to accumulate financial resources for future generations and to reduce the economy's dependence on adverse external factors. Management of the fund's assets was entrusted to the National Bank of Kazakhstan.

The National Fund began operating on 18 May 2001, when the first funds were credited to its account. Revenue from Kazakhstan's oil and gas sector was among the initial sources of its assets. In June 2001, about US$674.4 million was transferred to the fund's account, after which the National Bank began actively managing its investment portfolio.

On 1 September 2005, President Nursultan Nazarbayev signed Decree No. 1641, which approved the first Concept for the formation and use of the National Fund's resources over the medium term. The document set out the basic principles for accumulating, managing and using the fund's assets, including the separation of its savings and stabilisation functions.
