= 1999 Kazakh presidential election =

- 10 January 1999
- Turnout: 87.05% (▼1.18pp)
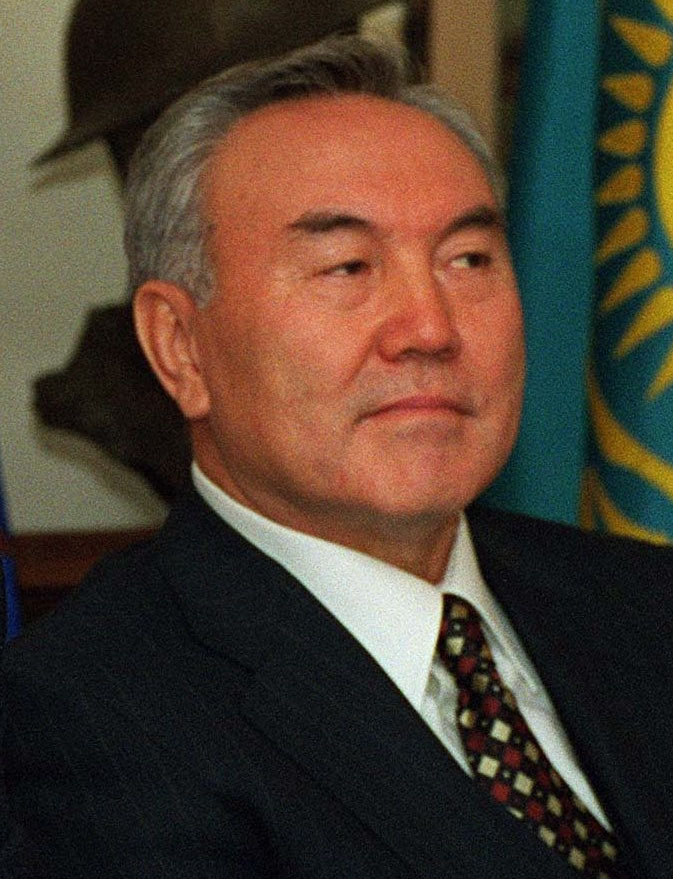

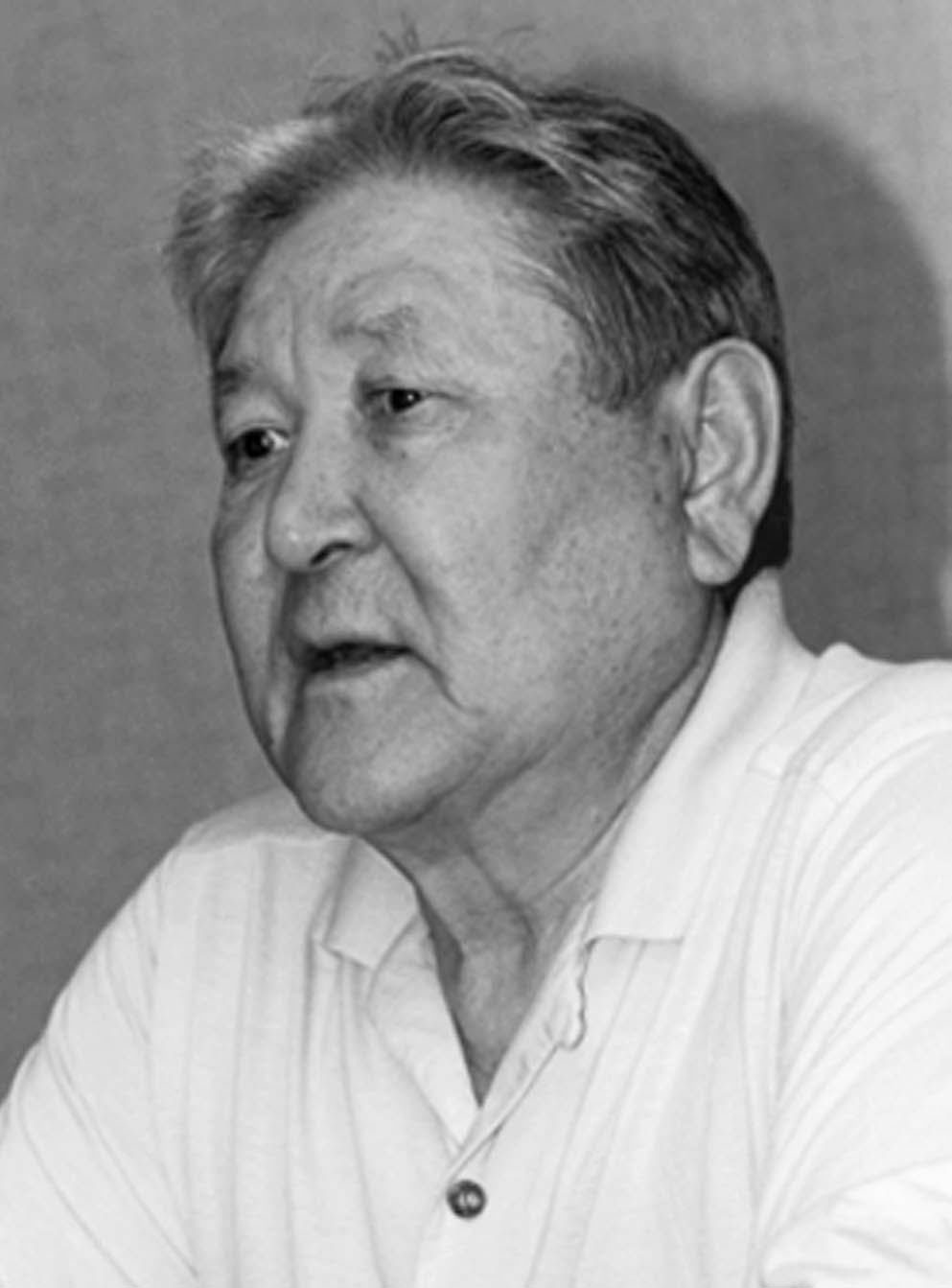
Nominee	Nursultan Nazarbayev	Serikbolsyn Abdildin
Party	Independent	Communist Party
Popular vote	5,846,817	857,386
Percentage	81.00%	11.90%
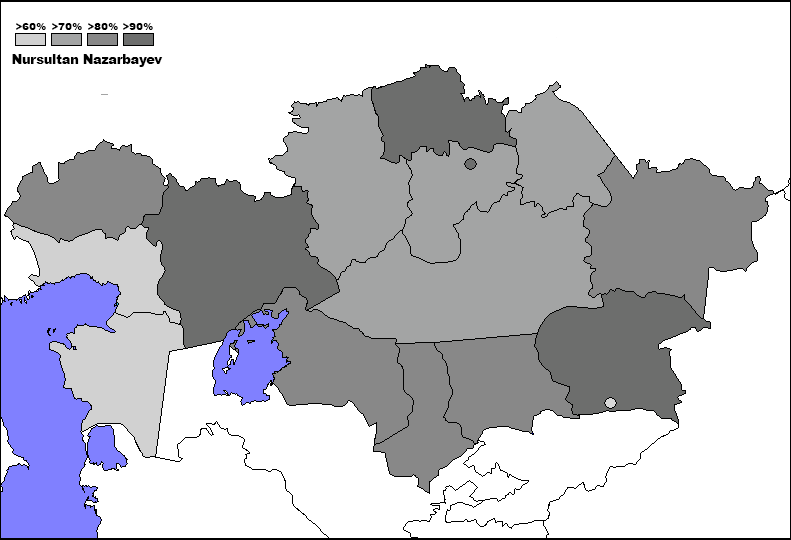
- Results by region
President before election
Nursultan Nazarbayev
Independent
Elected President
Nursultan Nazarbayev
Independent

Presidential elections were held in Kazakhstan on 10 January 1999. Incumbent president Nursultan Nazarbayev won the election with over 80% of the vote, and was sworn into office on 20 January 1999. Most observers viewed the election as blatantly unfair, further confirming that Nazarbayev was not interested in promoting a democratic system of government. Voter turnout was reported to be 87%.

== Background ==
Kazakhstan's second presidential election was originally scheduled to occur in 1996. However, after a 1995 referendum the date was then set to be in December 2000. Parliamentary action in the fall of 1998, however, ultimately resulted in the election occurring in early 1999.

On 7 October 1998 nineteen amendments to the constitution were passed by Parliament and signed into law by President Nazarbayev. One amendment to article 94 read: "By consent of the President of the Republic of Kazakhstan the present term of the powers of the President of the Republic may be reduced by resolution of the Parliament of the Republic, adopted at the joint session of its Chambers by the majority of votes of the total number of deputies of each Chamber. In such case the Mäjilis of the Parliament within one month shall order elections of the President of the Republic of Kazakhstan."

Acting under this new amendment, the following day Parliament asked Nazarbayev to shorten his current term in office. The president agreed, after which the Mäjilis set 10 January 1999 as the date for new elections.

Since the previous presidential election in 1991, Kazakhstan's political scene had changed significantly; Nazarbayev, who had previously been publicly viewed as one of the most reformist pro-democracy figures in the Soviet Union, had increasingly centralised power into his own hands, reorganising the previously-parliamentary government into a strong presidential system. He had dismissed the conservative, communist-dominated Parliament in 1993 by decree and replaced it with a multiparty legislature, which was subsequently dismissed by the Supreme Court a year later before a bicameral legislature was established with far weaker powers than the immediate post-Soviet parliament. Nazarbayev had adopted shock therapy policies of economic liberalisation with the backing of the International Monetary Fund, which led to public unrest.

The main opposition candidate, Akejan Kajegeldin, was barred from running in the election. The Organisation for Security and Co-operation in Europe criticised the government's refusal to register Kajegeldin and another candidate, noting that it raised doubts about whether it could be a fair election. A recently passed law prohibited anyone convicted of a crime from running in the election. Kazhegeldin had recently been convicted of participating in an unsanctioned election rally, thereby becoming ineligible to seek office.

== Conduct ==
Even before the election, groups such as the Organization for Security and Co-operation in Europe (OSCE) expressed concern about the short preparation and campaigning period. OSCE pressed the Kazakh government to postpone the election so that all candidates could have adequate time to campaign, but to no avail. U.S. vice president Al Gore called Nazarbayev in November 1998 to express concerns about the upcoming election.

The lack of fair access to mass media also concerned many observers. According to OSCE, most major media outlets focused disproportionately on Nazarbayev.

Serikbolsyn Abdildin, the runner-up in the election, claimed widespread voter fraud and a failure to properly count ballots.

The U.S. Department of State commented that the undemocratic nature of the elections "cast a shadow on bilateral relations".

== Results ==
Nazarbayev's party, the Party of People's Unity of Kazakhstan, was reformed into the Otan Party two months after the elections.

Candidate	Party	Votes	%
Nursultan Nazarbayev	Independent	5,846,817	80.97
Serikbolsyn Abdildin	Communist Party of Kazakhstan	857,386	11.87
Gani Qasymov	Independent	337,794	4.68
Engels Gabbasov	People's Union of Kazakhstan Unity	55,708	0.77
Against		123,703	1.71
Total		7,221,408	100.00
Valid votes		7,221,408	98.53
Invalid/blank votes		107,562	1.47
Total votes		7,328,970	100.00
Registered voters/turnout		8,419,283	87.05
Source: Nohlen et al.
