= Kazakhstan 2030 =

Development strategy for Kazakhstan up to 2030

Kazakhstan 2030 (Kazakh: Қазақстан-2030) is a development strategy for Kazakhstan up to 2030, first announced in the address of President Nursultan Nazarbayev to the people of Kazakhstan in 1997.

== History ==
In October 1997, President Nursultan Nazarbayev, in his address to the nation titled "Kazakhstan 2030: Prosperity, Security and Ever Growing Welfare of All the Kazakhstanis", announced a long-term plan for the country's development up to 2030. The programme set out seven long-term national priorities for this period: (1) national security; (2) domestic political stability and the consolidation of society; (3) economic growth based on an open market economy with a high level of foreign investment and domestic savings; (4) the health, education and well-being of the citizens of Kazakhstan; (5) energy resources; (6) infrastructure, particularly transport and communications; and (7) a professional state. According to the Kazakhstan Institute for Strategic Studies, the Kazakhstan 2030 strategy was the first document to clearly define the country's long-term development goals and the means of achieving them. In drafting the strategy, Nazarbayev drew on the experience of other countries: Franklin D. Roosevelt's New Deal in the United States, the strategic plans of China and South Korea, and Malaysia's Vision 2020.

At the 2005 conference "The Kazakhstan 2030 Strategy in Action", Nazarbayev noted that the strategy had been adopted at a time when Kazakhstan, not yet recovered from the economic crisis caused by the transition from a command to a market economy, was hit by a new wave of crisis triggered by the crisis in Southeast Asia and in Russia. At that time the country was experiencing delays in the payment of wages and pensions, high unemployment and rolling blackouts. However, thanks to economic and social reforms, Kazakhstan-2030 became a strategy of development rather than of survival.

On 11 October 2009, an international research and practice conference marking the 12th anniversary of the adoption of the Kazakhstan 2030 long-term development programme was held in Astana. Experts at the conference stated that the strategic document still defined the country's course of development.

In 2012, Nazarbayev stated that the Kazakhstan 2030 development strategy had been fulfilled ahead of schedule in a number of areas, and in December, in his annual address to the people of Kazakhstan, he presented the new Kazakhstan 2050 strategy.

== Content ==
The strategy set a long-term goal: to turn Kazakhstan into a secure, stable and environmentally sustainable state with a dynamically developing market economy. To achieve it, the document named seven long-term priorities.

The first priority named by the strategy is the preservation of the country's independence and territorial integrity. These were to be ensured by strengthening the state and maintaining good-neighbourly relations, first and foremost with Russia and China, as well as through integration with the states of Central Asia and the development of ties with the countries of the Near and Middle East.

The second priority is the preservation of domestic political stability and national unity as a precondition for implementing the strategy. The plan envisaged developing a common civic identity based on equal opportunities for all citizens, ensuring equality among ethnic groups and interfaith tolerance, narrowing the gap between rich and poor, and paying special attention to the problems of rural areas.

The third priority is economic growth based on an open market economy with a high level of foreign investment and domestic savings. The economic part of the strategy rested on ten principles, including:

- limited state intervention in the economy while preserving an active role for the state;
- macroeconomic stabilisation: low inflation, a small budget deficit, a strong national currency and a high savings rate;
- price liberalisation, completion of privatisation and protection of private property, including land ownership;
- an open economy and free trade, drawing on the country's transit position;
- protection of foreign investment and the right to repatriate profits;
- development of an industrial and technological strategy and diversification of production.

The figurative symbol of this goal became the "Kazakhstani snow leopard": as the author envisioned, Kazakhstan was to follow the path of the "Asian Tigers".

The fourth priority proceeded from the premise that economic growth alone would not ensure the well-being of citizens. In healthcare, the strategy provided for disease prevention and the promotion of healthy lifestyles, combating drug addiction and drug trafficking, reducing alcohol and tobacco consumption, protecting maternal and child health, and improving nutrition and the environment. Separate objectives were set for developing education and making it more accessible.

The fifth priority is a rapid increase in oil and gas production and exports in order to generate revenue for economic growth. To this end, the strategy proposed concluding long-term partnerships with the largest international oil companies, building export pipelines, developing domestic energy infrastructure with the help of foreign investment, and spending future resource revenues prudently.

The sixth priority is the development of transport and communications as sectors on which national security, political stability and economic growth depend.

The seventh priority is the creation of a compact and efficient state apparatus staffed by professional civil servants, the delineation of powers between central and local authorities, and the fight against corruption.

== Implementation ==
The strategy was implemented through a system of medium-term plans and sectoral programmes, and its objectives were refined in the president's annual addresses to the people of Kazakhstan.

In 2000 the Kazakhstan National Fund was established. Its purpose is to accumulate savings for future generations and to reduce the economy's dependence on external factors, above all on fluctuations in commodity prices.

The first long-term stage of the strategy's implementation was the Strategic Development Plan of the Republic of Kazakhstan until 2010. It was approved by Presidential Decree No. 735 of 4 December 2001, "On Further Measures to Implement the Development Strategy of Kazakhstan until 2030". On its basis the government adopted indicative plans, for example for 2003–2005.

The task of diversifying the economy was addressed by the Industrial and Innovative Development Strategy for 2003–2015 (Decree No. 1096 of 17 May 2003) and by its successor, the State Programme for Accelerated Industrial and Innovative Development for 2010–2014 (Decree No. 958 of 19 March 2010).

The second stage was the Strategic Development Plan of the Republic of Kazakhstan until 2020, approved by Decree No. 922 of 1 February 2010 and covering 2010–2019. It was prepared amid the global economic crisis, whereas the plan until 2010 had been drawn up during a period of global economic growth.

== Results and assessments ==
On 14 December 2012, in his annual address, Nazarbayev stated that many provisions of the Kazakhstan 2030 strategy had been fulfilled ahead of schedule. The address cited the following figures:

- the country's GDP grew more than sixteenfold, with an average annual growth rate of 7.6% since 1999;
- GDP per capita increased more than sevenfold, from $1,500 in 1998 to $12,000 in 2012;
- foreign direct investment per capita reached $9,200, the highest figure in the CIS;
- foreign trade turnover grew twelvefold, industrial output twentyfold, oil production threefold and natural gas production fivefold.
