= Turgyn Syzdyqov =

Kazakh politician

Turgyn Syzdyqov MP
- Тұрғын Сыздықов
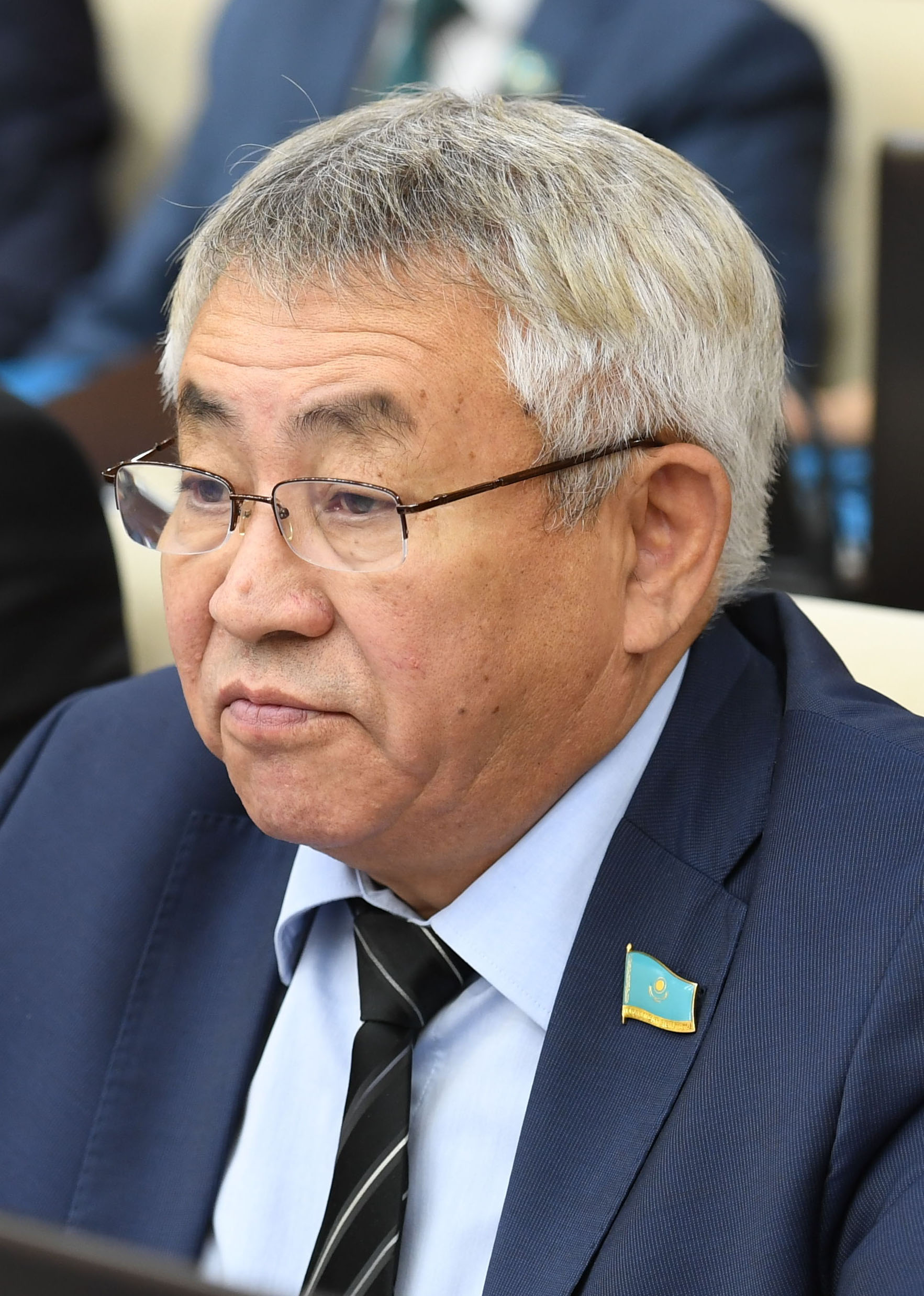
- Syzdyqov in 2018

Member of the Mazhilis
- In office 20 March 2016 – 11 January 2021

Secretary of People's Party
- Incumbent
- Assumed office 1 March 2014

Personal details
- Born: 2 August 1947 (age 79) Luganka, Kazakh SSR, Soviet Union
- Party: People's Party
- Children: 3
- Occupation: Politician

Tūrğyn Ysqaqūly Syzdyqov (Note: Often transliterated as Turgun Iskakovich Syzdykov through a Russified Romanization of Тургун Искакович Сыздыков.) (Kazakh: Тұрғын Ысқақұлы Сыздықов, Kazakh pronunciation: [to̙ɾɣɯn ɯsqɑqo̙ɫɯ sɯzdɯqəf]; born 2 August 1947) is a Kazakh politician, former chairman of the Communist People's Party (QKHP). He was a candidate in the 2015 Kazakh presidential election.

== Biography ==
=== Early life and education ===
Syzdyqov was born in the village of Luganka.

In 1966, he graduated from the Kazakhstan College of Mechanization and Electrification of Agriculture with a degree in mechanical engineering. He began his career in 1967 as a mechanic for the Chervonny state farm. From 1967 to 1968, Syzdyqov worked as a mechanic at the Kazakhselmash plant in Tselinograd. From 1968 to 1970, he worked as a master of vocational training at a Vocational School #81 in the village of Ruzayevka, at the same time, Syzdyqov was a secretary of the Komsomol committee of the vocational school, then an instructor at the Ruzaevsky District Committee of the Komsomol.

In 1974, he graduated from the Higher Party School under the Komsomol Central Committee in Moscow with a degree in History and Social Studies. After graduating, Syzdyqov served in the army from 1975 to 1980.

=== Political career ===
Syzdyqov worked as a secretary in the XV Congress of the CPSU until 1985. From 1985 to 1990, Syzdyqov worked as an apparatus of the Kokshetau Regional Committee, holding the post of an instructor and an organizer of the department of organizational and party work.

In 1990, Syzdyqov was elected as a second secretary of the Chistopol District Committee. From 1991, he worked as the chief specialist of the Chistopol Privatization Council. In 1992, he headed the Council of People's Deputies of the Chistopol District, and in 1993, Syzdyqov was appointed as a First Deputy Head of the Chistopol District Administration. From 1994 to 1996, he headed the Leningrad District Administration.

From 1996, Syzdyqov worked in the akim offices of the Kokshetau and North Kazakhstan regions as an instructor, deputy head, and the head of the organizational and personnel department.

From 1998 to 1999, he was the director of Kogalazhar LLP in the village of Gavrilovka and the director of the Ruzaevskaya agricultural experimental station in the village of Ruzayevka.

From 2000 to 2003, Syzdyqov held the position of head of the State Enterprise "Economic Management of the Akim of the Akmola Region".

From 2003 until 2013, he worked as the head of the apparatus in the Akmola Maslihat.

From 2013 to 2014, he was an adviser to the rector at the Walikhan State University in Kokshetau.

Since 2014, Syzdyqov is the secretary of the Central Committee of the QKHP. He ran in the 2015 Kazakh presidential election, losing in a crushing defeat by only winning 1.61% of the popular vote.
