= Gani Qasymov =

Kazakh politician

- Ғани Қасымов
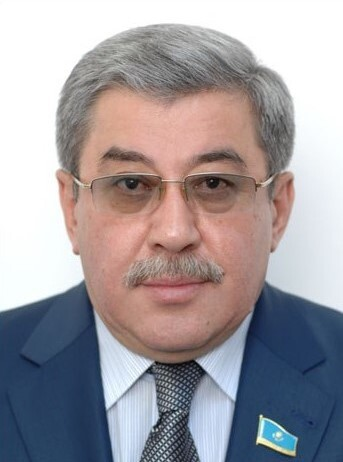
- Official portrait, 2011

Member of the Senate
- In office 29 August 2007 – 26 August 2013

Member of the Mäjilis
- In office 24 October 1999 – 19 September 2004
- Preceded by: Raisa Sher
- Succeeded by: Constituency abolished
- Constituency: Äuezov

Chairman of the State Customs Committee
- In office September 1996 – 5 September 2002
- President: Nursultan Nazarbayev
- Prime Minister: Akezhan Kazhegeldin; Nurlan Balgimbayev; Kassym-Jomart Tokayev; Imangali Tasmagambetov

Chairman of the Party of Patriots
- In office 1 July 2000 – 29 August 2015
- Preceded by: Office established
- Succeeded by: Tolymbek Gabdilashimov

Personal details
- Born: 3 May 1950 (age 76) Guryev, Guryev Oblast, Kazakh SSR, Soviet Union
- Party: Independent (1991–2000, 2015–present)
- Other political affiliations: Communist Party (1974–1991); Party of Patriots (2000–2015)
- Parents: Esengeldi Qasymov (father); Manara Qasymovna (mother)
- Education: MGIMO University

Military service
- Allegiance: Kazakhstan
- Branch/service: Customs
- Years of service: 1997
- Rank: Major-general

Ğani Esengeldinūly Qasymov (Kazakh: Ғани Есенгелдинұлы Қасымов; born 3 May 1950) is a Kazakh former politician, member of the Senate, Chairman of the Party of Patriots, Extraordinary and Plenipotentiary Envoy for Kazakhstan, and Major-general of the Kazakh Custom Forces. He is known for being a presidential candidate in the 1999 and 2011 Kazakh presidential elections.

== Early life and education ==
Qasymov was born on 3 May 1950 in Guryev (present-day Atyrau), Kazakh SSR.

In 1967, he entered the Kirov University but was transferred to the Moscow State Institute of International Relations in 1969, where he earned a degree in International Relations in 1974. From September of that year, he became the first secretary of the protocol department of the Ministry of Foreign Affairs of the Kazakh SSR, being head of the press and information department as well as the head of the protocol department. From July 1981, Qasymov was the Secretary General of the Ministry of Foreign Affairs of the Kazakh SSR. From September 1987, he enrolled in advanced training courses for senior diplomatic personnel at the Diplomatic Academy of the USSR Ministry of Foreign Affairs in Moscow. Qasymov became an adviser to the President of the Kazakh SSR Nursultan Nazarbayev in May 1990.

== Political activities ==
In February 1992, he became the Head of the International Department of the Office of the President of the Republic of Kazakhstan and the Cabinet of Ministers of the Republic of Kazakhstan. Qasymov worked in France as a Trade and Economic Representative of Kazakhstan from July 1994. He then was appointed to the Chairman of the State Customs Committee of the Republic of Kazakhstan in September 1996.

=== 1999 presidential campaign ===
In 1999, Qasymov ran for president as an independent in the 1999 Kazakh presidential election. He was invited to the analytical television program Portrait of the Week. During the conversation, the reporter constantly asked insulting questions. As a result, after the journalist's remark “And how, the next morning you don’t have a headache after drinking?”, Qasymov responded saying “could not stand it” and with the words “I see you need flowers and applause!” He threw a vase that was on the table with carnations.

A week later, Qasymov again came to the show with an apology. Drinking wine, he spoke in detail about his program and voiced his pre-election slogan “I will put things in order in the country with my hard hand!” In order to demonstrate it, Qasymov crushed the wine glass that was on his hand and showed the blood that appeared on his fingers.

However, before the election day, he suddenly disappeared from the media. As a result, Qasymov managed to get only 4.6% of the popular vote.

=== Later political career and 2011 presidential campaign ===
From 1999 to 20054, Qasymov was a deputy of the Mäjilis. He was elected on a second round of voting in the 1999 Kazakh legislative election from the Äuezov constituency.

From August 2007 to September 2013, by decree of the President of Kazakhstan, he was appointed as a member of the Senate.

In 2011, Qasymov again ran for president in the 2011 Kazakh presidential election, according to the CEC, he took second place, although he gained only 1.94% of the popular vote.

In October 2013, Qasymov became a representative of the National Chamber of Entrepreneurs in the Senate. From November 2013, he was a Chairman of the Council for the Protection of Entrepreneurs' Rights.

== Military rank controversy ==
According to a number of media reports, there was no official decree by the President of Kazakhstan on awarding the general rank to Qasymov. Having assumed the post of head of the customs department, Qasymov appointed himself as a major general of the customs service, introducing an army system of officer ranks for customs officers. The rank of reserve officer he at that time was a captain.

== Awards ==
- Order of Friendship 1st degree (2011)
- Order of Friendship 2nd degree (2005)
- 25th Anniversary of Kazakhstan's Independence (2016)
- Nazir Tyuryakulov Medal (2008)
- Honored Worker of the Diplomatic Service of Kazakhstan (2004)
- Order of the Commonwealth (IPA CIS, April 7, 2010)
- Altyn Adam (2000)
