= 1995 Kazakh presidential term referendum =

29 April 1995
- Do you agree to prolong the term of office of the President of the Republic of Kazakhstan Nursultan Nazarbayev, publicly elected on 1 December 1991, until 1 December 2000?

Results
Choice	Votes	%
Yes	7,932,834	96.21%
No	312,156	3.79%
Valid votes	8,244,990	99.22%
Invalid or blank votes	64,647	0.78%
Total votes	8,309,637	100.00%
Registered voters/turnout	9,110,156	91.21%

A referendum on extending the presidential term of Nursultan Nazarbayev was held in Kazakhstan on 29 April 1995. Voters were asked "Do you agree to prolong the term of office of the President of the Republic of Kazakhstan Nursultan Nazarbayev, publicly elected on 1 December 1991, until 1 December 2000?" The question was approved by 95.5% of voters, with turnout reported to be 91.2%.

== Results ==
Choice	Votes	%
For	7,932,834	96.21
Against	312,156	3.79
Total	8,244,990	100.00
Valid votes	8,244,990	99.22
Invalid/blank votes	64,647	0.78
Total votes	8,309,637	100.00
Registered voters/turnout	9,110,156	91.21
Source: Nohlen et al.
