= Nurly Zhol =

Kazakh infrastructure package

Nūrly Jol (Kazakh: Нұрлы жол, lit. 'Bright Path') is a US$9 billion domestic economic stimulus plan to develop and modernize roads, railways, ports, IT infrastructure, and education and civil services in the Kazakhstan. The Nūrly Jol plan was announced by and partially named after Kazakhstan's President Nursultan Nazarbayev in November 2014.

== Background ==
On 11 November 2014, the President of Kazakhstan Nursultan Nazarbayev delivered an unexpected state-of-the-nation address in Astana at an extended session of the Political Council of the Nur Otan party, introducing a "Nurly Jol" (Bright Path), a new economic policy that implies massive state investment in infrastructure over the next several years. The "Nurly Zhol" policy is accepted as preventive measures needed to help steer the economy towards sustainable growth in the context of the modern global economic and geopolitical challenges, such as the 25 percent-reduction in the oil price, reciprocal sanctions between the West and Russia over Ukraine, etc. The policy embraces all aspects of economic growth, including finances, industry and social welfare, but especially emphasises investments into the development of infrastructure and construction works. Given recent decreases in revenues from the export of raw materials, funds will be used from Kazakhstan's National Fund.

In 2015, Kazakhstan linked the policy to the Belt and Road Initiative.

== Areas of development ==
Nurly Zhol targets seven areas of infrastructure development:

1. transportation and logistics infrastructure
2. industrial infrastructure
3. energy infrastructure
4. public utilities infrastructure
5. housing infrastructure
6. social infrastructure
7. small and medium-sized enterprises

== Goals ==
Nurly Zhol is intended to turn Kazakhstan into a key Eurasian transport and logistics hub by modernizing roads, railways and ports, among others projects. Over $40 billion of projects are to be implemented within the Nurly Zhol framework by 2020. 1.4 million square meters of rental housing is expected to be constructed in 2015–2019. The New Economic Policy "Nurly Zhol" is expected to create over 200,000 new jobs.

== Results ==
Development of education infrastructure is an important component of Nurly Zhol. For example, within the Nurly Zhol program Karaganda region built four new education facilities.

Implementation of the Nurly Zhol program helped create 105,000 jobs and provided for a 1% GDP growth in 2016. Also, 611 km of roads were commissioned in 2016 as part of Nurly Zhol. In his State of the Nation address, President Nazarbayev said that, due to Nurly Zhol, Kazakhstan is in the beginning of a "complex global transformation."

Approximately US$2.2 billion was allocated under Nurly Zhol to improve highway quality and 426 km of roads were commissioned in 2018.

As of October 2020, access to clean public water supply was 92.6% (urban – 97.2%, rural – 86.4%). Prime Minister Askar Mamin promised 100% access to high-quality drinking water by 2025 under the program.

== Nurly Zhol 2020–2025 ==
The Nurly Zhol state infrastructure development programme for 2020–2025 focuses on developing road infrastructure. The programme aims to repair 27,000 kilometres of local roads, reconstruct 10,000 kilometres and repair 11,000 kilometres of national roads. The Kazakh Government estimated that the 2020–2025 programme would cost the country US$16.91 billion. It also plans to electrify approximately 1,033 km of railway tracks over the time period. As of 2019, only about 40% of the country's 16,000 km railway tracks are electrified.

As part of Kazakhstan’s Nurly Zhol infrastructure program, the country has a goal of improving up to 95% of local roads by the year 2025. 75% of local roads were improved by 2020.
