= Party of Patriots of Kazakhstan =

- Abbreviation: QPP
- Chairman: Tolymbek Ghabdilaschimow
- Founder: Gani Qasymov
- Founded: 1 July 2000
- Dissolved: 5 September 2015
- Merged into: Auyl People's Democratic Patriotic Party
- Headquarters: Almaty
- Ideology: Liberalism; Conservatism; Liberal conservatism
- Colors: White; Dark green Yellow

The Party of Patriots of Kazakhstan (Kazakh: Қазақстан патриоттары партиясы, romanized: Qazaqstan patriottary partiasy, QPP) was a political party in Kazakhstan. At the legislative elections of 19 September and 3 October 2004, the party won 0.6% of the popular vote and no seats in the Majilis (legislative assembly). In the 18 August 2007 elections, the party won 0.75% of the popular vote and no seats.

The party on 5 September 2015 merged with Kazakhstani Social Democratic Party Auyl to form the Auyl People's Democratic Patriotic Party in which according to QPP members was due to both parties having the same priorities, noting the fact that they were part of the Kazakhstan-2050 political alliance.
