= Kazakh opposition =

Kazakh protests

Kazakh democracy movement
- Date: 16 December 1986 – present (39 years, 10 months, 1 week and 6 days)
- Location: 1986–1991: Kazakh SSR; 1991–present: Kazakhstan
- Caused by: Authoritarianism; Kleptocracy; Political repression; Corruption
- Methods: Demonstrations; Online activism
- Status: Ongoing: Kazakhstan's independence; Resignation of President Nursultan Nazarbayev

Parties
1986–1991:
(Kazakh Soviet Socialist Republic) Opposition
1991–present:
- Opposition
  - Democratic Choice
  - Democratic Party
  - Oyan, Qazaqstan
  - Respublika
  - Erkindik Kanaty
  - Jusan Party
  - FreeKazakhs
  - Mother's Association
  - Alash National Freedom Party
  - Azat Civil Movement of Kazakhstan
  - People's Front «Qazaq Memleketi»
  - El Tıregı
  - Communist Party of Kazakhstan
  - Socialist Movement of Kazakhstan
1986–1991:
- Soviet Union
  - Kazakh Soviet Socialist Republic
1991–present:
- (Kazakhstan) Government
  - Security Council
  - National Security Committee
  - State Security Service
  - Ministry of Internal Affairs
    - Internal Troops (until 2014)
    - National Guard (since 2014)
    - Police
    - Military Police
  - Ministry of Defense
    - Armed Forces

Lead figures
Non-centralised leadership	1986–1991: (Kazakh Soviet Socialist Republic) Gennady Kolbin (1986–1989) (Kazakh Soviet Socialist Republic) Nursultan Nazarbayev (1989–1991) 1991–present: Nursultan Nazarbayev (1991–2019); Kassym-Jomart Tokayev (2019–present)

The Kazakh opposition consists of groups and individuals in Kazakhstan who have sought to challenge past and present governmental authorities. From 1986 to 1991 the opposition stood against the leaders of Soviet Kazakhstan. Since 1995, after the adoption of a new constitution and the transition from a parliamentary form of government to a presidential one, they have opposed the former and current president of Kazakhstan, Nursultan Nazarbayev and Kassym-Jomart Tokayev, respectively. Supporters of the movement tend to call for a parliamentary democracy based on a Western model, with freedom of speech alongside political and religious pluralism.

The Kazakh democracy movement is a series of political movements in Kazakhstan that are supported by opposition groups and civil activists which are seeking for reforms in Kazakhstan's current political system, formed from 1991 after the country gained its independence from the Soviet Union and became a sovereign state by advocating for a democratic, multi-party, parliamentary system. The movement dates back to 1986, when a group of Kazakh youth demonstrated against Gennady Kolbin's appointment as the First Secretary of the Communist Party of Kazakhstan due to his ethnicity which resulted in protests throughout the Kazakh SSR in an event known as Jeltoqsan and was eventually followed by the calls for the country's independence amid the dissolution of the Soviet Union. Nursultan Nazarbayev would eventually become the President of Kazakhstan and serve for three decades under an authoritarian regime. Over the recent years, calls for democratic reforms have grown following the decrease in standard of living which saw rise of consistent protests in Kazakhstan that eventually resulted in Nazarbayev's resignation as well as attempted reforms by the authorities which are seen as flawed and lacking among the general public.

== History ==
=== 1986 protests ===
In December 1986, well-known and long-time First Secretary of the Central Committee of the Communist Party of Kazakhstan Dinmukhamed Kunaev was dismissed from his post and was replaced by Gennady Kolbin, an ethnic Russian which received discontent among the Kazakh public. Riots and clashes between protestors and police broke out on 17 December at the Brezhnev Square (now Republic Square) in Almaty and eventually spread to other parts in the city. As result, 168–200 people were killed and more than 200 were injured with large detentions taking place.

In June 1989, Kolbin was replaced by ethnic Kazakh, Nursultan Nazarbayev, who previously served as the Chairman of the Council of Ministers. After Nazarbayev's rise to power, Kazakhstan experienced in the rise of authoritarianism and corruption which faced opposition movements that were met with political repressions, eventually leading to a decline in civil activism and opposition in the country.

=== 1989–1991 ===
In the aftermath of the Jeltoqsan protests, a new aspect of political life in Kazakhstan as new nationalist movements such as Azat, Jeltoqsan and Alash began to form which called for independence from the Soviet Union and the anti-nuclear Nevada Semipalatinsk movement led by Olzhas Suleimenov sought for closure of the Semipalatinsk Test Site. Rallies and demonstration were held in the country and independent media began to appear, as well as increased price of goods which led to inflation.

=== 1991 presidential election ===
On 16 October 1991, President Nursultan Nazarbayev signed a decree scheduling the country's first direct presidential elections to be held on 1 December 1991. The Supreme Soviet proposed People's Congress of Kazakhstan leader, anti-nuclear activist Olzhas Suleimenov for candidacy to which he declined to run himself. Hasen Qojahmetov, leader of the Jeltoqsan National Democratic Party expressed his desire to join the race, however the requirement for collecting 100,000 signatures for registration was unusually higher to which Qojahmetov as a result wasn't able to collect, claiming that parts of the signatures were stolen by the police. Nazarbayev appeared alone on the ballot and won 98% of the vote in what was seen as a sham election.

=== 1992–1995 ===
In June 1992, demonstrations were held in Alma-Ata by the Azat, Jeltoqsan and Alash parties which called for the resignation of former Communist officials within the government, specifically President Nursultan Nazarbayev. An estimated 5,000 persons participated in 17 June rally with Nazarbayev himself claiming that the situation would lead to a "complete split in society."

Following the 1994 Kazakh legislative elections where newly formed political parties for the first time were allowed to participate, some parties such as the nationalist ones boycotted the elections while the Communist Party of Kazakhstan itself was barred from participating. In the result, four major pro-presidential parties occupied the seats in the Supreme Council although it created some form of a multi-party system within the Parliament. The opposition criticized the elections as not meeting democratic standards.

In March 1995, followed by the decision from the Constitutional Court, Nazarbayev dissolved the Supreme Council. This led to dissatisfaction amongst the 72 MP's whom went on a three-day hunger strike while several MP's even refused to leave the Parliament House, warning of the growth of authoritarianism and political repression that would happen within the country by expanding executive branch's power.

=== 1996 ===
Protest against Nazarbayev's policies was held on 8 December 1996 which was barely mentioned in Kazakh media. According to journalists, around 3500 persons participated in the demonstration which lasted for about three hours.

=== Democratic Choice of Kazakhstan (2001) ===
On 17 November 2001, several known Kazakh officials and businessmen announced the creation of the Democratic Choice of Kazakhstan (QDT) where it revealed its policies of empowering parliament, direct elections for regional authorities, introducing election and judiciary reforms as well as granting more freedom to the media.

A sanctioned rally by the QDT with a support by the Communist Party of Kazakhstan (QKP) was held in Almaty on 20 January 2002. The QDT called for a referendum on the need to continue democratic reforms, stronger role for the Parliament in control of the government and Prosecutor General's Office, direct elections of äkıms and the development of local government. An estimated 2000–5000 people attended the demonstration.

=== 2005 presidential election ===
In the aftermath of the 2004 Kazakh legislative elections, the Coordinating Council of Democratic Forces of Kazakhstan was created on 15 October 2004 by the initiative of Ak Zhol Democratic Party, Communist Party of Kazakhstan and the Democratic Choice of Kazakhstan. Its purpose was to coordinate actions and consolidate the efforts of democratic forces to implement political reforms in Kazakhstan by uniting efforts of political parties, public associations and other organizations, social and political figures of the country to create a union of democratic forces of Kazakhstan. In March 2005, a political alliance For a Just Kazakhstan was formed and along with the Coordinating Council, former Mazhilis Chairman Zharmakhan Tuyakbay was nominated by to be the only opposition presidential candidate. At the 2005 Kazakh presidential elections, Tuyakbay swept just 6.6% of the vote and refused to concede the race, citing electoral fraud that was committed by the Central Election Commission.

=== Killing of Sarsenbaiūly (2006) ===
On 13 February 2006, Nağyz Ak Zhol co-chairman Altynbek Sarsenbaiuly was found shot dead in his car along with his bodyguard and driver. An unsanctioned opposition rally was held in Almaty on 26 February where 1000 people demanded the justice for Sarsenbaiuly's death.

After the Almaty Regional Court found the leaders of For a Just Kazakhstan and Alğa! parties guilty for illegally organising event, a hunger strike was then held in response to the court's decision on 1 March 2006.

A rally in memory of Sarsenbaiuly was held at the Şoqan Uälihanov Square in Almaty on 10 February 2007, where little more than 1000 demonstrators paid respects to Sarsenbaiuly. This marked the first time that a sanctioned demonstration was held in the city center and not in the outskirts.

=== Zhanaozen 2011 massacre ===
Zhanaozen has been described as "a one-industry town ... centered on the ageing oilfield of Ozen". In May 2011, workers from the Ozenmunaigas oil field went on strike for unpaid danger money, higher wages and better working conditions. The strike was declared illegal by local courts and the state oil company fired nearly 1000 employees. Some of the sacked workers then started a round-the-clock occupation of the town square in protest, demanding better union representation and recognition of workers' rights. The strike continued for months without official interference. According to Radio Free Europe, the protest expanded, "with demonstrators furious over what they saw as a stranglehold on collective bargaining and labor rights by the government." In mid-December, some workers in the square began calling for the right to form independent political parties free of the government's influence.

On 16 December, there were clashes between protesters and police who were attempting to evict them from the square in preparation for an Independence Day celebration. Activists claimed security officers opened fire on unarmed demonstrators. Authorities claimed that "bandits" infiltrated the protesters and began the riots first, producing video to support their version of events. Eleven were killed, according to government officials, though opposition sources put the death toll in the dozens.

=== 2012 ===
Following the Zhanaozen massacre and 2012 legislative elections, around 200 people protested in Almaty against the election results, citing voter fraud on 17 January 2012.

On 28 January, 300–1000 people gathered in Republic Square in an unsanctioned rally, demanding for democratic change and a transparent investigation regarding the Zhanaozen riots.

=== 2016 protests ===
The 2016 Protests against land reforms in Kazakhstan were a massive, unauthorized protests that were held in Kazakhstan against the new amendments to the Land Code, which began on 24 April 2016 in the city of Atyrau. Three days later, the rallies were held in the cities of Aktobe and Semey. During the first three rallies, the authorities did not try to harshly suppress the protests, but tried to calm the protesters and offer other forms of dialogue. Only on May 21, the authorities thoroughly prepared to suppress any protests in all administrative centers of the republic.

=== Re-establishment of the QDT and 2018–2020 Kazakh protests ===
In April 2017, exiled Kazakh banker Mukhtar Ablyazov announced the re-establishment of the Democratic Choice of Kazakhstan (QDT). From 2018, the QDT held unsanctioned rallies throughout Kazakhstan aimed at resignation of the government, end of corruption, as well as the transformation from the presidential system to parliamentary republic. Protests became intensified from February 2019, after a fire burned down apartment building killing five children.

=== 2019 election of Kassym-Jomart Tokayev ===
Protests broke out in the cities of Astana and Almaty on 9 June 2019. The protest itself was organized by a banned opposition group the Democratic Choice of Kazakhstan which is led by a former, now-exiled Kazakh banker Mukhtar Ablyazov. The Ministry of Internal Affairs reported that in Nur-Sultan, the protesters used throwing stones, objects that came to hand, and used pepper spray, which caused three police officers to be injured. According to official reports, the units of the Ministry of Internal Affairs, the police and the National Guard took measures to ensure public safety and law and order, the squares and streets were cleared of protesters by dispersal and detentions. According to the statement of the First Deputy of the Ministry of Internal Affairs Marat Kojaev, on 9 June, during the protests, about 500 people were detained among which were journalists. By 18 June, there were reports of the detainees of about 4,000 people in all cities of Kazakhstan.

The opposition prior to that, called for boycott in the elections while Tokayev's challenger, Amirjan Qosanov, whom proclaimed himself to be an opposition candidate, was seen as compromised figure. Tokayev in response to the situation blamed poverty for the sole cause of protests and promised that the government would address the social and economic problems within the country.

=== 2022 January events ===
A series of mass protests that began in Kazakhstan on 2 January 2022 after a sudden sharp increase in liquefied gas prices following the lifting of a government-enforced price cap on 1 January. The protests began peacefully in the oil-producing city of Zhanaozen and quickly spread to other cities in the country, especially the nation's largest city Almaty, which saw its demonstrations turn into violent riots, fueled by rising dissatisfaction with the government and widespread poverty. During the week-long violent unrest and crackdowns, 238 people were killed and over 9,900 were arrested, according to Kazakh officials.

== Opposition parties and organisations ==
- Democratic Choice of Kazakhstan
- Democratic Party of Kazakhstan
- Alga Kazakhstan
- Oyan, Qazaqstan
- Mother's Assosation
- Femenita

== Opposition figures ==
- Serikbolsyn Abdildin
- Mukhtar Ablyazov
- Marat Zhylanbayev
- Jasaral Quanyşälin †
- Mukhtar Dzhakishev
- Aron Atabek †
- Dulat Agadil †
- Janbolat Mamai
- Aidos Sadykov
- Serikzhan Bilash
- Zhanar Sekerbayeva

== Symbols ==
Kazakh opposition supporters do not have an established flag, unlike the Belarusian opposition and Russian opposition. They usually use the Kazakh national flag and are associated with the colour blue.
