= 2018–2020 Kazakh protests =

2018–2020 pro-democracy protests in Kazakhstan

- Part of Kazakh opposition
- Date: 10 May 2018 – 1 March 2020
- Location: Kazakhstan
- Caused by: Corruption; Inflation; Political repression; Electoral fraud; Kleptocracy; Authoritarianism; Police brutality; Human rights violations; Opposition to presidents Nursultan Nazarbayev and Kassym-Jomart Tokayev
- Goals: Transition towards parliamentary republic; Resignation of Nursultan Nazarbayev from the Security Council; Resignation of Kassym-Jomart Tokayev and the government; Democratic transition; Release of political prisoners; Cancellation of the nuclear power plants construction
- Methods: Demonstrations; Online activism
- Concessions: Dismissal of Sagintayev's government; Resignation of President Nursultan Nazarbayev; Increased social benefits; Release of some protest detainees and political prisoners; Reduced restrictions on authorized rallies

Parties
(Kazakhstan) Opposition: Democratic Choice; Democratic Party; Oyan, Qazaqstan; Respublika; Erkindik Kanaty; Jusan Party; FreeKazakhs; Mother's Association	(Kazakhstan) Kazakh Government: Security Council; National Security Committee; Armed Forces; State Security Service; Ministry of Internal Affairs; National Guard; Police; Military Police

Lead figures
Mukhtar Ablyazov; Janara Ahmetova; Erjan Turgumbai; Janbolat Mamai; Bella Orynbetova; Aidos Sadykov; Gani Stambek	Nursultan Nazarbayev (Kazakhstan) Kassym-Jomart Tokayev (Kazakhstan) Askar Mamin (Kazakhstan) Nurtai Abykayev (Kazakhstan) Kalmukhanbet Kassymov (Kazakhstan) Mäulen Äşimbaev (Kazakhstan) Dariga Nazarbayeva (Kazakhstan) Bektas Beknazarov (Kazakhstan) Nurlan Nigmatulin (Kazakhstan) Adilbek Zhaksybekov (Kazakhstan) Erbolat Dosaev (Kazakhstan) Kairat Kelimbetov (Kazakhstan) Umirzak Shukeyev (Kazakhstan) Sauat Mynbayev (Kazakhstan) Mukhtar Tleuberdi (Kazakhstan) Aslan Musin (Kazakhstan) Askar Zhumagaliyev (Kazakhstan) Imangali Tasmagambetov (Kazakhstan) Nurlan Yermekbayev (Kazakhstan) Murat Bektanov (Kazakhstan) Murat Maikeyev (Kazakhstan) Saken Zhasuzakov (Kazakhstan) Mukhtar Altynbayev (Kazakhstan) Asset Issekeshev (Kazakhstan) Murat Beketayev (Kazakhstan) Altai Kólginov (Kazakhstan) Bakhytzhan Sagintayev (Kazakhstan) Daniyal Akhmetov; Karim Massimov; Marat Khusainov; Erlan Turgymbaev; Gabit Bayanov

The 2018–2020 Kazakh protests were a series of civil protests that took place in cities across Kazakhstan, commencing in May 2018 and gaining traction after a fire in Astana killed five children in February 2019. Some commentators attribute President of Kazakhstan Nursultan Nazarbayev's decision to dismiss the government of Prime Minister Bakhytzhan Sagintayev later that month in part to the protests. Nazarbayev himself resigned on 19 March 2019 and was replaced as president by Kassym-Jomart Tokayev, the speaker of the upper house of parliament. Nazarbayev continued to hold several political positions. Tokayev called a snap election, the 2019 Kazakh presidential election, which saw him elected with over 70% of the vote. Both the run-up to and the aftermath of the election saw further protests.

Protests continued to be reported in the rest of the year, including protests marking Independence Day in Astana (then renamed Nur-Sultan) and Almaty on 16 December. Public rallies that have not been permitted by the government are illegal in Kazakhstan, although Tokayev has stated he intends to liberalize the laws governing public protests.

A public poll released in October suggested that a plurality of Kazakhs, 43%, viewed public demonstrations positively, with 16% expressing a negative view and another 41% not expressing an opinion.

== Background ==
Protest movements in Kazakhstan include the December 1986 Jeltoqsan protests while Kazakhstan was part of the Soviet Union and the December 2011 Zhanaozen massacre in which 14 protesters were killed. In April and May 2016, Kazakhs protested in relation to changes in the law in relation to land ownership. Two hundred activists and protesters were arrested.

== Party and civil society groups ==
Groups associated with the protests include an illegal political party, Democratic Choice of Kazakhstan (QDT), the civil rights organisation Oyan, Qazaqstan (Wake up, Kazakhstan), Respublika, Erkindik Kanaty and a mother's association created following the protests against the February fire.

== Chronology ==
=== 2018 ===
QDT leader Mukhtar Ablyazov called for rallies to be held on 10 May 2018 to coincide with the visit to Kazakhstan of the official mission of the European Parliament which was to assess how the country is fulfilling its obligations to respect human rights. Unauthorized protests took place that day in the cities of Astana, Almaty, Oral, Aktobe, Atyrau, Semey and Shymkent where the participants demanded the release and an end of torture of political prisoners. According to observers and participants, the number of police officers in Almaty and Astana was comparable to the number of participants in the protests. An estimated 50 people were detained in Almaty while the news agency Present Time put an estimate of 80. The Ministry of Internal Affairs did not give the exact number of those detained.

Another rally was set to take place on 23 June by the QDT. A video published on YouTube on 12 June named "Teachers go to Ablyazov's rally" was received condemnation by the Prosecutor General's Office which stated that the "content of the videos does not correspond to reality and is aimed at inciting social hatred and enmity in Kazakhstani society." The Prosecutor General's Office also accused of Ablyazov hiring professional actors and models with Asian appearance in videos whom were not Kazakhstani citizens–but in fact–Kyiv residents and warned that Kazakhstanis willing to participate in an unsanctioned rallies would violate the provisions of the law "On the Procedure for Organizing and Conducting Peaceful Assemblies, Rallies, Processions, Pickets and Demonstrations" and that participants would face up 15 days of arrest. On the day of protests, dozens of people were detained in cities of Almaty, Astana, and Shymkent of which none of them expressed any demands nor did not hold banners in their hands.

On 16–17 December, detentions took place in Kazakhstan such as in Almaty where activists attempted to honor the memory of the victims of Zhanaozen massacre and Jeltoqsan in the Republic Square. The police department of the Bostandyq District commented on situation saying that all detainees after 1 pm were all released.

=== 2019 ===
==== February protests ====
On 4 February 2019, five sisters were killed by a house fire in Astana (later, Nur-Sultan) that broke out at night, while both their parents were working night shifts. The fire sparked a controversy on social media and led to some small-scale protests. Paul Stronski of the Carnegie Endowment for International Peace wrote:

The house fire, however, epitomizes many of the country's social problems, as well as the widening gap between the government and the governed. Despite the frigid climate of northern Kazakhstan, this family lived in a new part of town that that had yet to have city gas pipes installed, leaving them no option but to turn on the stove to keep their children warm. But, like many things in the country, that stove apparently did not meet safety standards. Citizens now often blame the country's pervasive culture of corruption and wasteful spending for such horrific deaths. This anger about lax oversight – of the country's financial resources, of its rapid urbanization, and of its poor – exposes a lack of public confidence in state structures.

By 15 February, the outrage had led to protests reported as numbering in the hundreds. A protest in Nur-Sultan at a public event where Mayor Bakhyt Sultanov was speaking resulted in him being shouted off the stage.

On 21 February, President Nursultan Nazarbayev issued a statement announcing he had dismissed the government led by Prime Minister Bakytzhan Sagintayev. The Diplomat reported: "Many reports (such as those in RFE/RL and Eurasianet) regarding Nazarbayev's decision point squarely to recent protests as a triggering factor" for the government's dismissal. On 19 March, Nazarbayev unexpectedly resigned as president, leading to the appointment of Kassym-Jomart Tokayev, the speaker of the upper house of parliament, as the new President of Kazakhstan. Nazarbayev retained his status in several powerful positions, such as being Chairman of the Security Council and Chairman of the ruling party Nur Otan and in October 2019 gained the right to veto appointments of most ministers, of provincial governors and of some other senior officials.

==== 2019 presidential election ====
Protests broke out in the cities of Nur-Sultan and Almaty on 9 June 2019. The protest itself was organized by a banned opposition group the Democratic Choice of Kazakhstan which is led by a former, now-exiled Kazakh banker Mukhtar Ablyazov. The Ministry of Internal Affairs reported that in Nur-Sultan, the protesters used throwing stones, objects that came to hand, and used pepper spray, which caused three police officers to be injured. According to official reports, the units of the Ministry of Internal Affairs, the police and the National Guard took measures to ensure public safety and law and order, the squares and streets were cleared of protesters by dispersal and detentions. According to the statement of the First Deputy of the Ministry of Internal Affairs Marat Kojaev, on 9 June, during the protests, about 500 people were detained among which were journalists.

On 10 June, at an unauthorized protest, Rinat Zaitov, a Kazakh musician and poet who was a supporter of Amirjan Qosanov, was detained in Almaty, where his speech was filmed by Channel 31, who also recorded his arrest on video. Soon after the legal interview, Zaitov was allowed to go home. However, late in the evening, in front of the building of the police department, citizens gathered in search of Zaitov and demanded his release. After they were informed that Zaitov was at home, they did not want to leave. At the request of law enforcement agencies, Zaitov was taken from home at night to the gathering place of citizens, where he urged people not to violate the law by complying with the legal requirements of law enforcement officers. Zaitov asked the crowd to go home and not succumb to the provocations. The remaining protesters then held a march on Töle Bi Street which was accompanied by drivers honking their horns, causing an overflow in traffic. In response to the situation, law enforcement including the riot police closed off the street and conducted arrests. A Tengrinews journalist Shoqan Alhabaev was knocked to the ground and hit several times by the officers. Other protesters, fleeing the pursuing police, hid in residential areas. According to the adviser of the Ministry of Internal Affairs Nurdilda Oraz, about 200 people were detained, in which 150 of them were brought to justice. President-elect Kassym-Jomart Tokayev called on the protesters to dialogue.

By 18 June, there were reports of the detainees of about 4,000 people in all cities of Kazakhstan. The operator of the online news Vlast.kz Yekaterina Suvorova, the journalist of Azattyq Pyotr Trotsenko and political scientist Dimaş Äljanov, who worked at the NGO Center for Legal Policy Research, were arrested. British journalist Chris Rickleton, who worked for Agence France-Presse, said on Twitter that he was also detained. Rickleton and his colleague spent two hours at the local police department before Deputy Foreign Minister Roman Vasilenko intervened. He called the journalists and apologized, after which they were released.

==== August–December ====
Protestors held a march calling for constitutional reform on 30 August. None were detained.

On 21 September, people in Almaty and Nur-Sultan protested against the economic role of China in Kazakhstan, with banner slogans including "Let's not give way to Chinese expansion" and an anti-Nazarbayev slogan "The old man is the enemy" and called for political prisoners to be released. Security forces detained 57 protesters.

Ablyazov and the Democratic Choice of Kazakhstan initiated further protests in both Nur-Sultan and Almaty in October 2019, which police said resulted in 26 people being arrested.

Protests took place in Nur-Sultan and Almaty on 9 November calling for "freedom for political prisoners, a parliamentary republic, and fair elections", coordinated by Respublika and Oyan, Qazaqstan.

Another round of protests in both cities, involving "up to 100 anti-government protesters" was held on 16 December, timed to mark Independence Day. Reuters reported that "dozens" of protesters were taken into custody. The protest was held to commensurate the victims of Jeltoqsan and Zhanaozen massacre.

=== 2020 ===
==== January–February protests ====
Around 50 female protesters gathered in front of the Labour and Social Protection Ministry on 13 January demanding an increase in financial support to single mothers, mothers taking care of handicapped children, and those with low incomes. The protesters were invited to the building by the representative of akim's office, Elnur Beisenbaev. The women refused after the journalists were not allowed to accompany them. The women then marched to the presidential administration but were stopped by the police.

On 22 February, multiple protests were held across the country. Two of them were held in Almaty. The first one was organized by the Democratic Party of Kazakhstan (QDP), led by Janbolat Mamai, who was detained by the police earlier on Friday night and faced 3 days of detention. Another one was held later that same day by the Democratic Choice of Kazakhstan (QDT). Around 200 protesters were detained.

===== Agadil's death =====
On 25 February, a demonstration was held in front of the Interior Ministry building in Nur-Sultan over the death of Kazakh political activist Dulat Agadil while he was held in a detention center. According to the Internal Affairs Minister Erlan Turgymbaev, Agadil's death was caused by "heart problems". The protesters demanded a detailed information about his death as well as the officials to come out of the building to speak to them. After receiving no response, the activists then blocked a street which resulted in police violently detaining the protesters into the police buses.

On 27 February, the day of Agadil's funeral, a protest was held in front of the Astana Concert Hall in Nur-Sultan, to demand the creation of an independent commission including the participation of civil society representatives to investigate Agadil's death. The police dispersed the rally, and loaded about 20 people into police buses. In Almaty, 80 people gathered in Republic Square to mourn Agadil.

President Kassym-Jomart Tokayev made a public statement on Agadil's death in an interview to Informburo.kz on 29 February saying that "given the great public outcry, I carefully studied this case. I can say with confidence that, unfortunately, the Agadil activist died as a result of heart failure. To say otherwise is to go against the truth."

Calls for protests to be held on 1 March 2020 were met with blocked access to main city squares and detainment dozens of people. In Almaty, dozens of protesters reached the Republic Square in front of the Äkimat building until being arrested by the police who every corner of the neighborhood around the building. Members of the Oyan Qazaqstan were detained at a coffee shop, where around 30 of them, including three journalists, were whisked away into police vans. Other members of Oyan and as well as the opposition groups were reported to have been stopped at their doorsteps as they left their homes. According to the Internal Affairs Minister Erlan Turgymbaev, around 80 citizens were detained of which only four were brought to justice while the rest were released.

== See also ==
- Jeltoqsan – December 1986 protests in Almaty, at the time named Alma-Ata
- Zhanaozen massacre – December 2011 protests in the Mangystau Region with 14 protesters killed
- 2022 Kazakh unrest
