= Turan Battalion =

Turkic volunteer militia fighting in the Russo-Ukrainian War

- Батальйон «Туран»
- Founder: (Kazakhstan) Aidos Sadyqov
- Commander: (Turkey) Furkan Çetin
- Founded: November 20, 2022
- Country: Ukraine
- Allegiance: Armed Forces of Ukraine
- Ideology: Pan-Turkism; Turanism; Anti-Russian sentiment
- Status: Active
- Size: ≈1000
- Part of: Ukrainian Ground Forces

The Turan Battalion (Ukrainian: Батальйон «Туран», romanized: Batalion "Turan") is a Turkic volunteer battalion of the Ukrainian Armed Forces fighting in the Russo-Ukrainian War.

== History ==
On November 20, 2022, a Kazakh opposition activist named Aidos Sadyqov declared the group's creation in his Telegram channel. He appointed Kyrgyz national Almaz Kudabek, who worked as a hairdresser in Kyiv, as the commander of the group. Almaz Kudabek appeared in the group's introduction video where he states that the group's goal is to fight against Russia's "genocide against Turkic peoples", and also threatened Vladimir Putin and Ramzan Kadyrov. The Kyrgyz ambassador to Ukraine, Idris Kadirkulov, offered Kudabek to return to Kyrgyzstan, but Kudabek rejected the offer and chose to keep fighting in Ukraine. In a January 2023 interview, Almaz Kudabek said that the Turan Battalion had about 600 fighters, and claimed that Kadyrov had placed a 500 thousand dollar hit on him. When Almas Kudabek was talking about his motives, he stated "we just want to fight Russians, we know what they are." After the Battle of Bakhmut ended, Kudabek said that the Turan Battalion was participating in more battles and that they grown in size. He also said that Kyrgyzstan had placed an arrest warrant on him, and stated "Kyrgyzstan is my homeland, I will always love it. But Ukraine is my home now, I am fighting for Ukraine. The only relief is that many Kyrgyz express support, I am fighting shoulder to shoulder with many compatriots."

The Turan Battalion has ethnic Kazakhs, Kyrgyz, Azerbaijanis, Uyghurs, Tatars, Crimean Tatars, and various other Turkic peoples from Russia and the North Caucasus among its ranks. A fighter from the Russian-Ukrainian war named Zhasulan Duysembin, "the Kazakh Rambo", also joined the battalion.

== See also ==
- Noman Çelebicihan Battalion
- International Legion (Ukraine)
