= Bolat Atabaev =

Kazakh theater director (1952–2021)

- Born: 15 May 1952; Alma-Ata Region, Kazakh SSR, Soviet Union
- Died: 28 July 2021 (aged 69)
- Occupations: Theater and film director
- Awards: Goethe Medal (2012)

Bolat Atabaev (15 May 1952 – 28 July 2021) was a Kazakhstani theater director who in 2012 was charged with "inciting social discord" for his role in the 2011 Mangystau riots. Amnesty International designated him a prisoner of conscience. He was released on 3 July 2012.

== Role in Zhanaozen protests ==
In May 2011, oil workers in the city of Zhanaozen in Kazakhstan's Mangystau Province began striking. Atabaev joined the workers and worked to communicate their demands to authorities.

On 16–17 December 2011, the region saw a series of riots in which striking oil workers clashed with state security forces. At least 15 civilians were killed and 100 wounded by police shootings.

Atabaev publicly protested the use of lethal force against the protesters. In early 2012, he joined a public commission founded by activists to investigate the violence. In March, he also staged a play in Almaty which dealt with the Zhanaozen events indirectly. Titled Avalanche, the play showed daily life in a mountain village in which villagers must obey every order of their elders in order to avoid actions which might trigger a deadly avalanche. After the elders order a pregnant woman to be buried alive, however, the villagers realize the threat of avalanche was manufactured by the elders to maintain control, and they rebel. All proceeds from the play were donated to the families of those who died in the Zhanaozen shootings.

== Criminal charge ==
On 6 January 2012, the National Security Committee of the Republic of Kazakhstan (NSC) charged Atabaev with "inciting social discord" for his role in the protests. He was later released on bail. The charge carries a maximum sentence of ten years' imprisonment. Several other opposition figures were arrested in connection with the protests, including journalist Zhanbolat Mamay, politician Serik Sapargali, and Democratic Choice of Kazakhstan leader Vladimir Kozlov.

In early June, Atabaev refused to report for an interrogation, which the court had made a condition of his bail. On 14 June, the court authorized his arrest, and he was arrested by the NSC the following day. Atabaev stated that he had "refused to go for interrogation so as to protest against the charges brought against him and to highlight the injustice of the government's treatment of protesters and striking workers in Zhanaozen."

Amnesty International condemned the charges, which it described as "trumped-up". The organization designated Atabaev a prisoner of conscience, "detained solely for exercising his right to freedom of expression". Human Rights Watch also protested the arrest of Atabaev and other activists, stating that "If the Kazakh authorities can prove these political activists were involved in the violence in Zhanaozen, they shouldn’t need to resort to using vague and undefined criminal allegations to imprison them ... The 'inciting social discord' charge should be dropped immediately and those against whom there is no evidence of any violent activity should be released from custody." Anti-censorship group ARTICLE 19 described the charge as "spurious" and "alarming", warning that the arrests of Atabaev and others would have "a chilling effect on freedom of expression in Kazakhstan".

The German government called for his release, with Human Rights Commissioner Markus Loening describing Atabaev as "guilty of only using his constitutional right of free expression". German film director Volker Schlöndorff, a friend of Atabaev's, also appealed to the Kazakh government on his behalf.

Atabaev was released on 3 July after being made to sign a document stating that "I am sorry that the bloodshed happened". His official status was subsequently changed from "accused" to "witness".

== Recognition ==
In August 2012, Atabaev was awarded the Goethe Medal of Germany's Goethe-Institut, a prize of the German government for non-citizens for artistic contributions. That same year, he spoke at the Oslo Freedom Forum in San Francisco, where he screened footage from Zhanaozen and proposed founding an Abai-inspired civic initiative.
