= National Guard of Kazakhstan =

National Guard of Kazakhstan: Қазақстан Ұлттық ұланы (Kazakh); Национальная гвардия Казахстана (Russian)
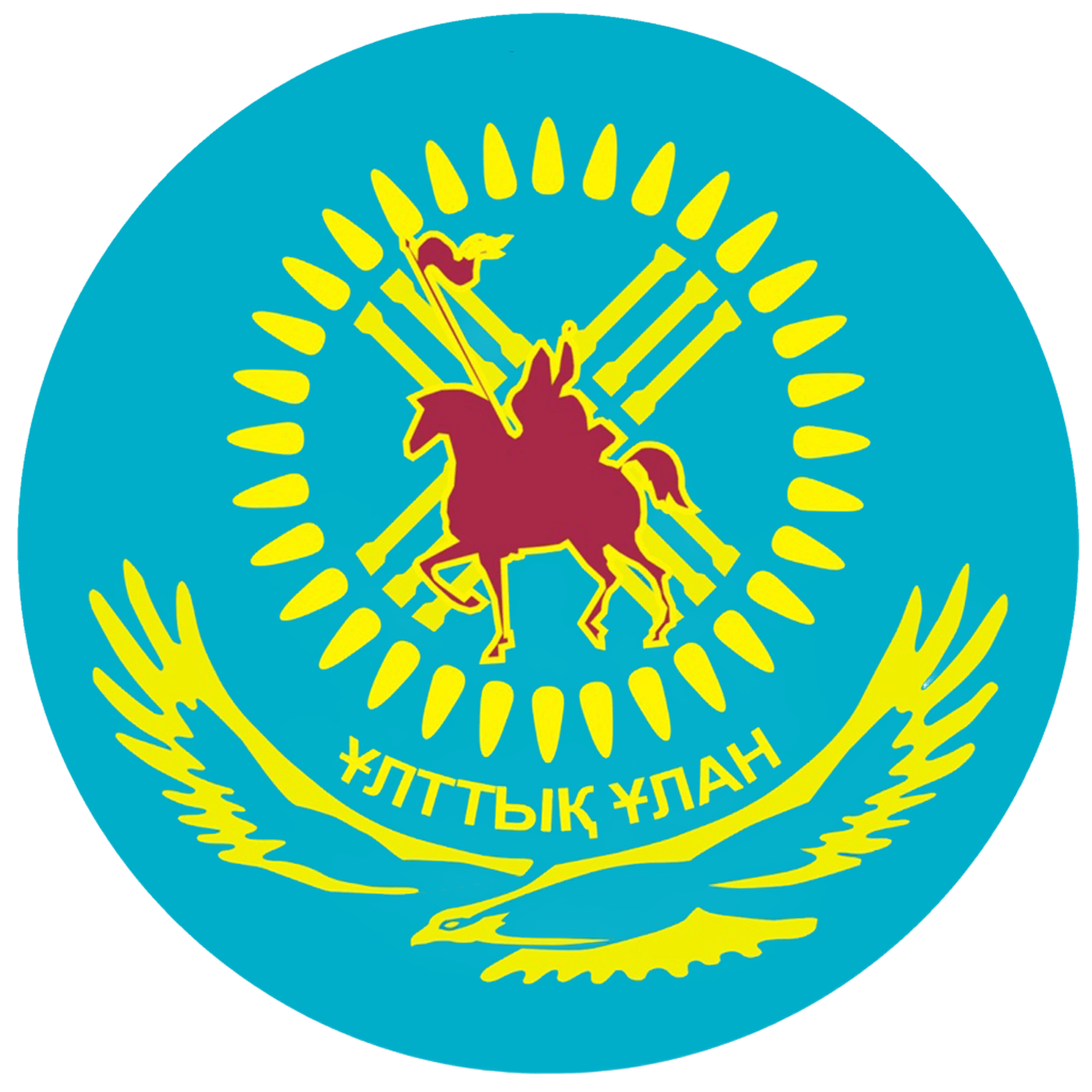
- Roundel of the National Guard

- Flag of the National Guard

Agency overview
- Formed: 21 April 2014
- Preceding agency: Internal Troops of Kazakhstan

Jurisdictional structure
- Operations jurisdiction: Kazakhstan
- Area: 32,400
- Governing body: Ministry of Internal Affairs
- General nature: Gendarmerie

Operational structure
- Headquarters: Astana
- Minister responsible: Lieutenant General of Police Erjan Sädenov, Minister of Internal Affairs
- Agency executive: Major General Ansagan Baltabekov, Commander-in-Chief of the National Guard
- Parent agency: Ministry of Internal Affairs

Notables
- Significant operations: Kazakh opposition; 2018–2020 Kazakh protests; 2020 Dungan–Kazakh ethnic clashes; 2022 Kazakh unrest
- Anniversaries: April 7 (Day of Courage); April 21 (Founding day); May 7 (Defender of the Fatherland Day)

Website
- Official website

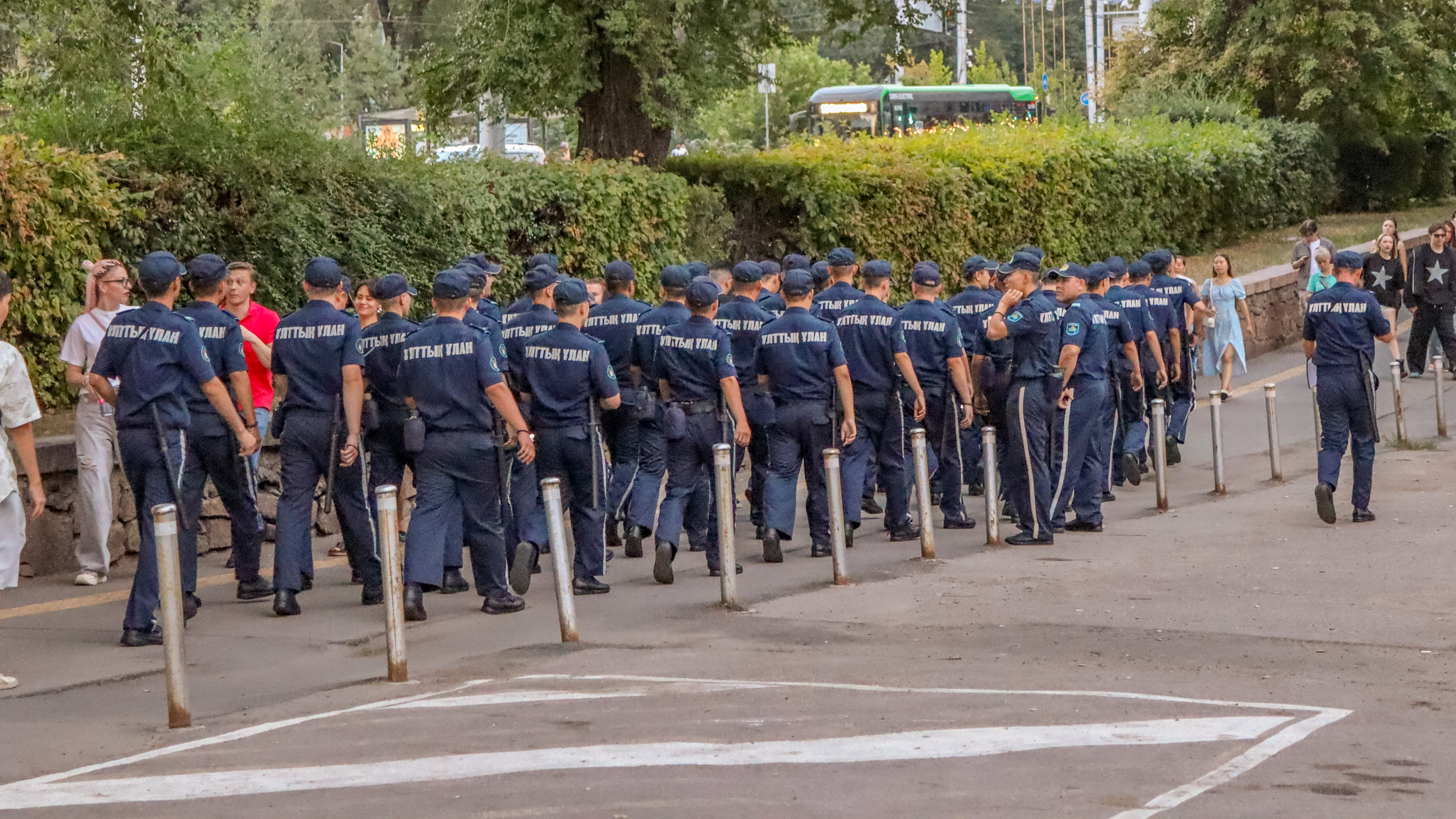
Men in the National Guard uniform march in Almaty, Kazakhstan

The National Guard of the Republic of Kazakhstan (Kazakh: Қазақстан Республикасының Ұлттық ұланы, Qazaqstan Respublikasynyñ Ūlttyq ūlany; Russian: Национальная гвардия Казахстана, Natsionalnaya gvardia Kazakhstana) is the internal military force of Kazakhstan. The National Guard performs the military and civilian functions of the Internal Troops of Kazakhstan, which it succeeded. The National Guard often cooperates in unison with many local Kazakh police departments. The Ministry of Internal Affairs of Kazakhstan is the main government agency responsible for the management of the National Guard.

The National Guard shares some of the same goals and functions as its predecessor, the Internal Troops:

- Provide security to important cargo and corrective institutions
- Maintain of a social order and a state of alertness during national emergencies such as natural disasters
- Dismantle illegal armed formations
- Prevent terrorist and/or illegal formations from being assembled in the boundaries of Kazakhstan

== History ==
The Internal Troops of Kazakhstan, which is the precursor to the present-day National Guard, was formed by order of the President of Kazakhstan Nursultan Nazarbayev on January 10, 1992. On April 21, 2014, by a Presidential Decree, the internal troops of the Ministry of Internal Affairs of Kazakhstan were transformed into the National Guard of Kazakhstan. This was done as part of the government's new doctrine in relation to the armed forces that was adopted that year.

In June 2016, Islamic militants killed three people at a National Guard facility in Aktobe during an ambush. In September 2018, it was reported that the National Guard received the first 8 Shaanxi Y-8's from the Shaanxi Aircraft Corporation.

== Leadership ==
The Commander-in-Chief of the National Guard (currently Major general Ansagan Baltabekov) is appointed and dismissed by the President of the Republic of Kazakhstan. It is the seniormost post acting as the commanding officer of the entire branch, reporting to the president through the Minister of Internal Affairs. The assistant to the commander-in-chief and the head of all the headquarters directorates was known as the Chief of Staff.

- First Deputy Commander-in-Chief - Chief of Staff – Major general Aktanov K.M.
- Deputy Commander-in-Chief of the National Guard – Major general Matkarimov A.M.
- Deputy Commander-in-Chief of the National Guard for educational and social and legal work – Colonel Qayrat Umbetov.
- Deputy Commander-in-Chief of the National Guard for Equipment and Armament – Colonel Voronkin K.
- Deputy Commander-in-Chief of the National Guard for Logistics – Major general Omarkulov Zh.K.
- Secretary of the Military Council – Colonel Imirov S.K.

== Organization ==
=== Academy ===
The National Guard Academy (Kazakh: Қазақстан Республикасы Ұлттық ұланының Академиясы; formerly the Military Institute of the National Guard) is a higher education institution that trains officers for the National Guard. It was established on March 18, 1997 and is based in Petropavl.

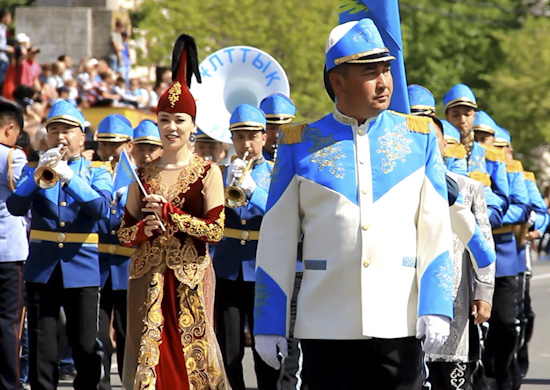
The National Guard Band.

=== Regional commands ===
The National Guard is divided into the following 4 regional commands. The Central Regional Command is the largest formation of the National Guard.

- Regional Command "Central" (based in Karaganda) – Colonel Shekarbekov S.A.
  - Military Unit 3477
  - Military Unit 3502
  - Military Unit 3514
  - Military Unit 3517
  - Military Unit 3650
  - Military Unit 3656
  - Military Unit 3660
- Regional Command "South" (based in Almaty) – Major general Amriev T.K.
  - Military Unit 5451
  - Military Unit 5510
  - Military Unit 5511
  - Military Unit 5512
  - Military Unit 5513
  - Military Unit 5514
- Regional Command "West" (based in Oral) – Major general Zhumagaliev A. M.
  - Military Unit 5516
  - Military Unit 5517
  - Military Unit 5518
  - Military Unit 5546
  - Military Unit 5547
  - Military Unit 5548
  - Military Unit 5570
  - Military Unit 5571 named after Hero of the Soviet Union, Guard Colonel Bauyrzhan Momyshuly
  - Military Unit 5572
  - Military Unit 5573
    - Guard of Honour of the National Guard (Military Unit 5573)
  - Military Unit 6505
  - Military Unit 6506
  - Military Unit 6636
  - Military Unit 6637
- Regional Command "East" (based in Oskemen) – Major general Akbalin R.N.
  - Special Operations Battalion "Military Unit 6654"
  - Military Unit 6655
  - Military Unit 6656
  - Military Unit 6679
  - Military Unit 6697
  - Military Unit 6698
  - Military Unit 6699

=== Other affiliated units ===
- Kazakh Special Forces "Birkit"
- Band of the National Guard
- Song and Dance Ensemble of the National Guard

== Operations ==
=== Public security ===
The servicemen of the Central Regional Command take part in the most significant international and socio-political events such as OSCE summits, the Asian Games, the Universiade, the EXPO and many others. Military Units 5451, 5516 and 5510 ensured public order and security in Astana during the celebration of the 20th anniversary of the capital in 2018.

== Military Institute ==
The branch of the National Guard focused on education is the Military Institute of the National Guard. It works to implement educational programmes of higher education and training future officers of the National Guard. It was founded as the Higher Military College of the Internal Troops by governmental decree on March 18, 1997. This date is today considered to be the official birthday of the institute. President Nazarbayev would present the school with its own ceremonial banner that December.

== Symbols ==
Battle Flag of the National Guard

The Emblem of the National Guard consists of an image of the sun's rays with a silhouette of a floating eagle similar to the eagle on the national flag, covered with a blue stripe at the bottom and a silhouette of a horse rider with a flag pole in their hands. At the bottom, the words National Guard, written in the Kazakh language are in between the sun and the eagle. Regional commanders, formations and military units of the National Guard have standard their own battle flags, usually belonging to a particular regiment.

=== In popular culture ===
In March 2018, a movie called Sixth Post premiered in Astana, showing the life and career of Erbol Otarbayev, a National Guard member who confronted convicts who escaped prison in Mangistau in 2012. The movie also shows the National Guard in its daily duties and responsibilities. The drama was directed by Serikbol Utepbergenov, while the Information and Communications Ministry of Kazakhstan, in coordination with the Khabar Agency filmed the movie. In April 2019, it was announced that the national guard would be filming a television series focusing on the role of Kazakh soldiers in battles on the Tajik-Afghan border in 1995.

==== Media ====
- "Kalan" (Shield) Newspaper
- "Birkit" (Berkut) Magazine

== Gallery ==
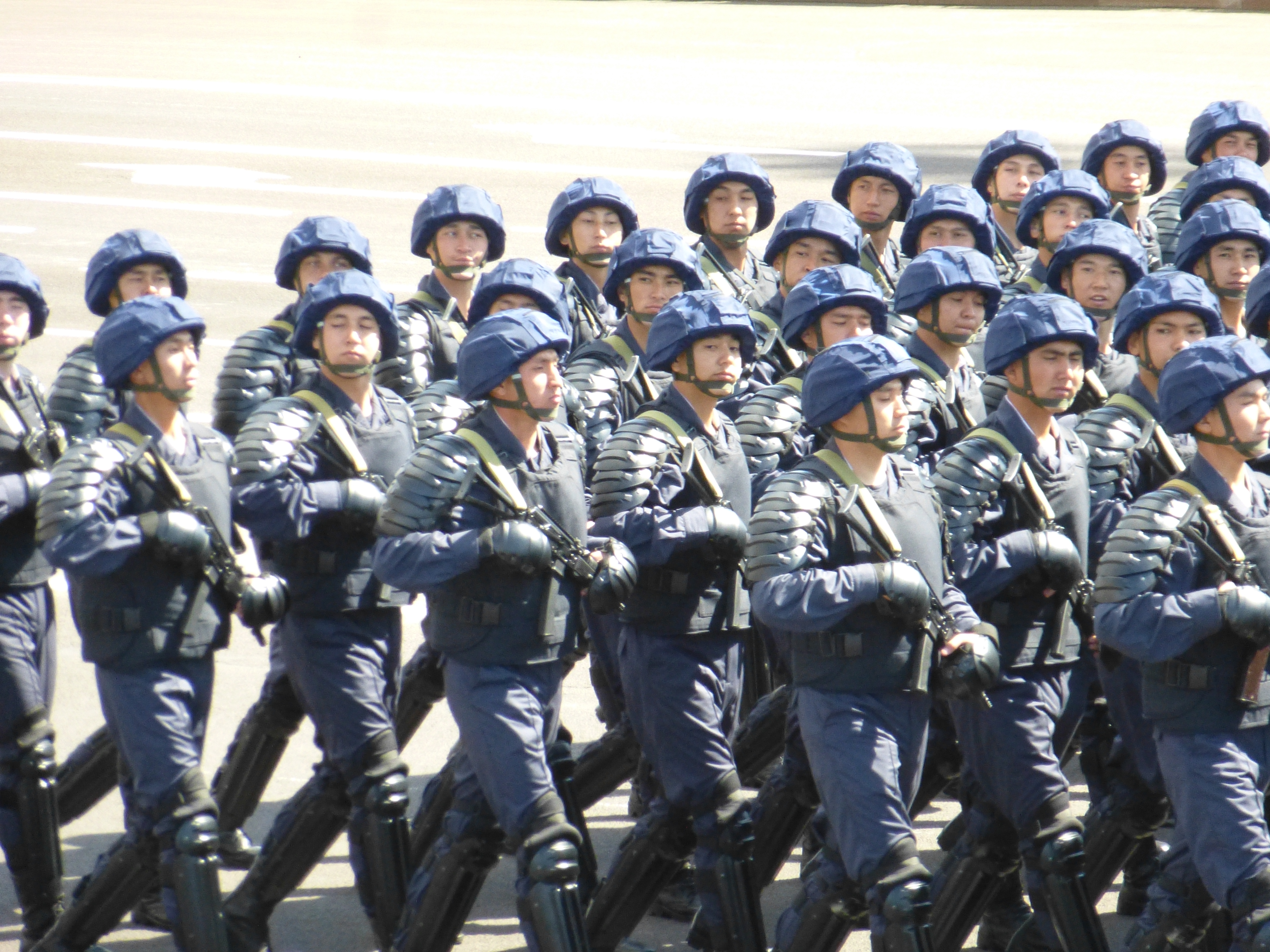
The troops of the National Guard during a parade in Astana in 2017.

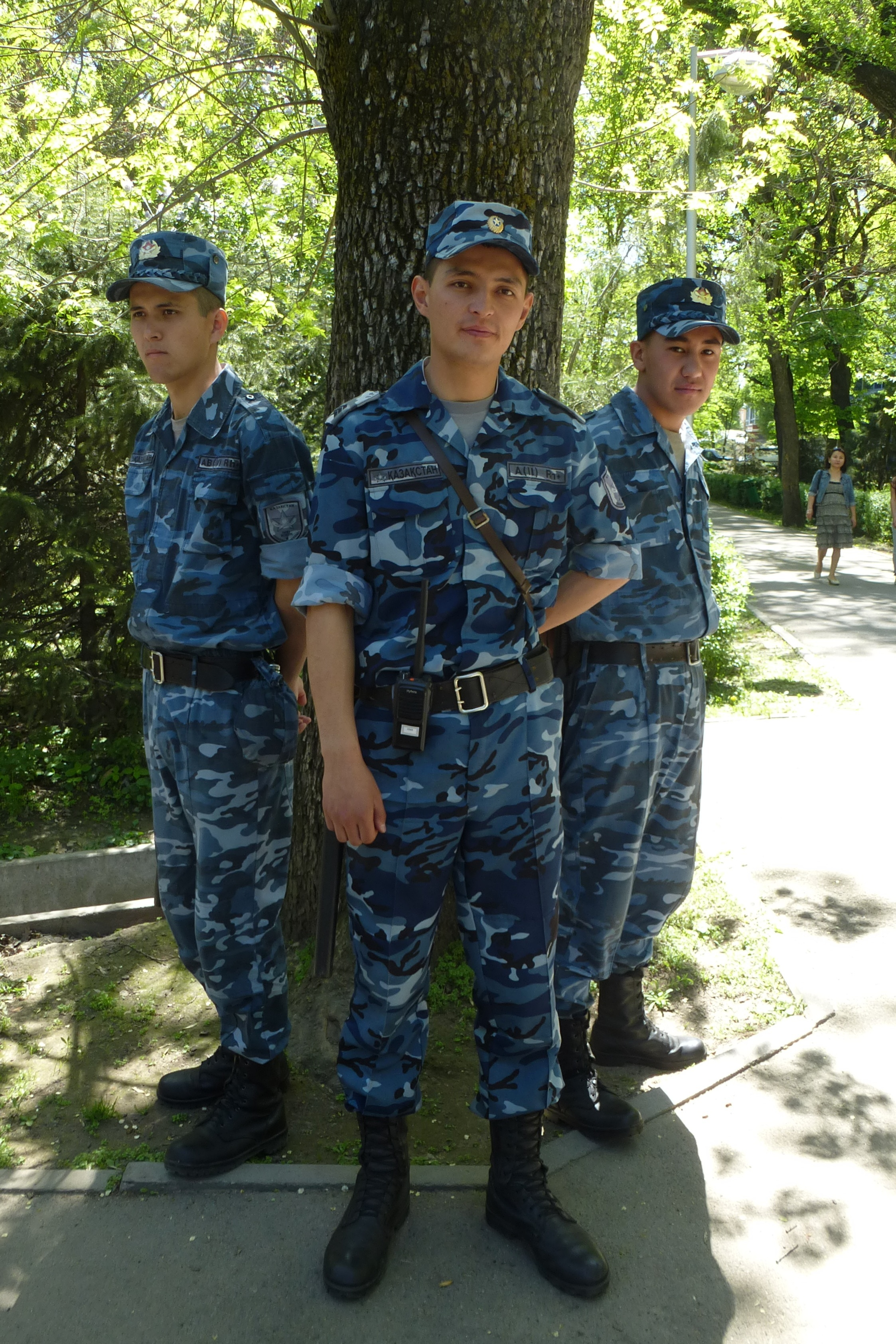
Soldiers of the National Guard.

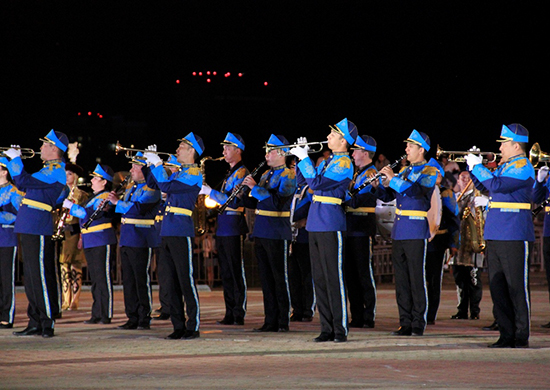
The Band of the National Guard of the Republic of Kazakhstan.

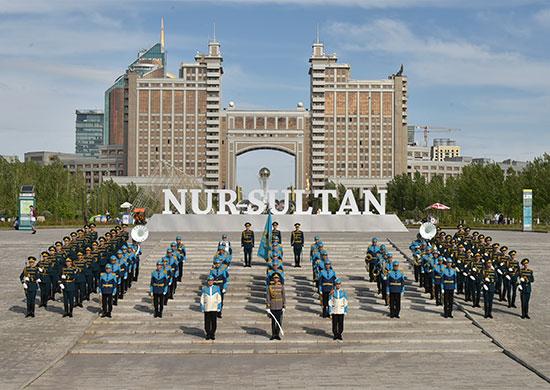
The band and the affiliated honour guard.

== See also ==
- Republican Guard (Kazakhstan)
- Ministry of Internal Affairs of Kazakhstan
- Armed Forces of the Republic of Kazakhstan
- Internal Troops of Kazakhstan
- Military Police (Kazakhstan)
