= Res publica (disambiguation) =

Res publica is a Latin phrase meaning "public issue" or "public matter".

Res publica may also refer to:

- Res Publica (journal), a journal published by the Association for Social and Political Philosophy
- Res Publica (magazine), a Polish cultural-political magazine, published 1979-1981 and 1987-1992 and then as,
  - Res Publica Nowa, 1992-2002
- Res Publica (US), a former US-based global civic advocacy group that co-founded Avaaz
- Res Publica University, a former university in Jakarta, Indonesia
- Res Publica, a defunct journal published by the Centre for Applied Philosophy and Public Ethics, Australia
- De re publica, a dialogue by Cicero
- Republic, a type of state, deriving its name from the Latin phrase
- ResPublica, a political think tank in the UK
- Roman Republic, an ancient polity, preceding the Roman Empire
- Union for the Republic - Res Publica, a former Estonian political party
- Respublica, a Kazakh political party
- Rzeczpospolita

== See also ==
- Respublika (disambiguation)
