= Socialist Movement of Kazakhstan =

Communist political organisation in Kazakhstan

- Kazakh name: Қазақстанның Социалистік Қозғалысы
- Russian name: Социалистическое Движение Казахстана
- Chairperson(s): Ainur Kurmanov
- Founded: 20–21 May 2006 (as Socialist Resistance); 7 May 2011 (renamed Socialist Movement)
- Headquarters: Almaty, Kazakhstan
- Newspaper: Социалист ("Socialist")
- Ideology: Communism; Marxism–Leninism; Historical: Democratic socialism; Trotskyism
- Political position: Far-left
- International affiliation: IMCWP (since 2016); CWI (2006–2015)
- Colours: Red

Party flag

Website
- socialism.kz

The Socialist Movement of Kazakhstan, (Note: Kazakh: Қазақстанның Социалистік Қозғалысы, romanized: Qazaqstannıñ Socïalïstik Qozğalısı, abbreviated ҚСҚ or QSQ; Russian: Социалистическое Движение Казахстана, romanized: Socialističeskoe Dvizheniye Kazahstana, abbreviated СДК) previously known as the Socialist Resistance of Kazakhstan (Note: Kazakh: Қазақстанның Социалистік қарсылығы, Qazaqstannyń Sotsıalıstik karsylyǵy, abbreviated СоҚ or SoQ; Russian: Социалистическое Сопротивление Казахстана, Socialističeskoe Soprotivlenie Kazahstana, abbreviated СоцСопр or ССК) from 2006 to 2011, is a banned Marxist-Leninist party Kazakhstan. It is active in a number of cities but operates primarily in Almaty.

Originally the Kazakhstani section of the Trotskyist Committee for a Workers' International (CWI), the organisation has since moved away from Trotskyism and now participates in the primarily Marxist–Leninist International Meeting of Communist and Workers' Parties (IMCWP).

Prominent members of the Socialist Movement of Kazakhstan include Ainur Kurmanov and Esenbek Ukteshbayev, leaders of the independent Kazakhstani trade union Zhanartu who are currently living in exile. Along with other members of the Socialist Movement of Kazakhstan, both have faced arbitrary detention by authorities and assassination attempts while living in Kazakhstan.

== History ==
The Committee for a Workers' International announced on 23 May 2002 that it had established a section in Kazakhstan, following a conference held by its Kazakhstani members in neighbouring Russia earlier that month. From its inception the CWI's section in Kazakhstan came under attack by authorities, with one member being detained en route to the conference which established the organisation, and others reportedly being attacked as they gathered for the conference.

In early 2006, leading members of the CWI's Kazakhstani section decided to create a more formal organisation which would be independent from the CWI. The founding congress of the "Socialist Resistance of Kazakhstan" was held from 20 to 21 February 2006. The group hosted its first event shortly afterwards on 23 February 2006—a rock concert in Almaty titled "Rock for Free Education", in which a number of local musicians participated in.

The Socialist Resistance of Kazakhstan was instrumental in the "Leave the People's Homes Alone" campaign, an anti-eviction movement, and in "Kazakhstan 2012", a campaign by trade unions and other labour organisations for electoral reform.

At the fourth meeting of the Kazakhstan 2012 campaign held on 7 May 2011, the Socialist Resistance of Kazakhstan renamed itself the "Socialist Movement of Kazakhstan" and announced plans to register a political party with Kazakhstan's Central Election Commission named the "Socialist Workers' Party". However, such a party was never established.

Takhir Narimanovich Mukhamedzyanov, the leader of the Socialist Movement of Kazakhstan, was found dead in his home under suspicious circumstances on 5 June 2012. His body was discovered by his friends, who had grown concerned after he failed to turn up for work for several days. Mukhamedzyanov received a number of death threats in the weeks leading up to his death.

The Socialist Movement of Kazakhstan supported the strike and demonstrations by Kazakhstani oil workers in Zhanaozen in December 2011. After the police opened fire and killed over 14 demonstrators in Zhanaozen, the Socialist Movement of Kazakhstan accused the Nur Otan government of Nursultan Nazarbayev of conducting a massacre.

The Socialist Movement of Kazakhstan supported workers' strikes during the 2022 Kazakhstani protests which initially began due to an overnight doubling of fuel prices. The organisation called for the withdrawal of armed troops from Kazakhstan's cities, the resignation of the Tokayev government, the release of political prisoners, and the legalisation of labour demonstrations, independent trade unions, the Communist Party of Kazakhstan, and the Socialist Movement of Kazakhstan itself.

== Policies ==
The Socialist Movement of Kazakhstan campaigns for socialism through the achievement of a workers' revolution, an end to authoritarianism, and calls for the nationalisation of the economy under the control of workers.

The party specifically advocates in its program for:

- Democracy in the interests of the working majority in the form of a state, in the governing bodies of which all workers will be represented, and in which the state itself will wither away, dissolving in the bodies of social self-government
- Socialization of industry, banking, transport and communications, as well as land and natural resources, including oil and gas, and workers' control over the production and distribution of all public goods
- A democratic planned economy under the full and direct control and administration of the organized working class
- The right of all nations to cultural and state self-determination up to secession or unification
- A free and equal alliance of workers' states on a global scale that will end the chaos of imperialist wars and ethnic conflicts
- A government of workers with a socialist program

== Gallery ==
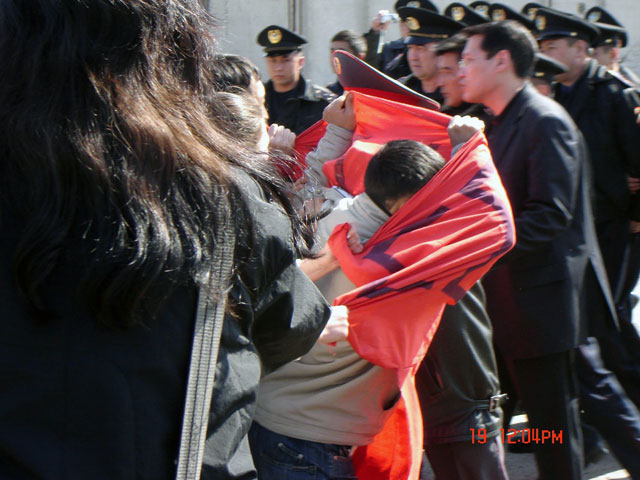
A member of the Socialist Resistance of Kazakhstan breaks through a police cordon during a demonstration in 2006

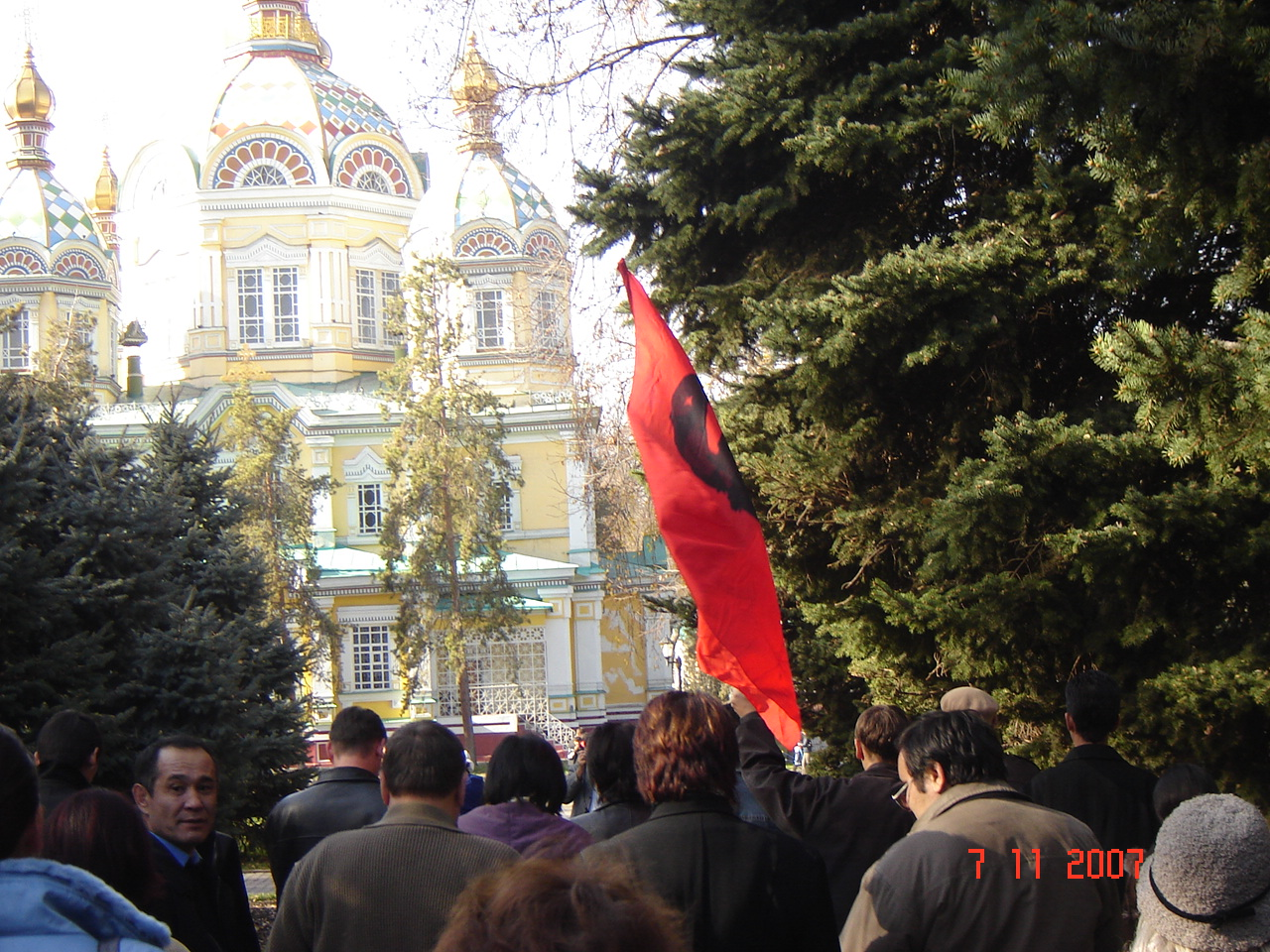
Members of the Socialist Resistance of Kazakhstan gathering in front of Ascension Cathedral in Almaty, 7 November 2007

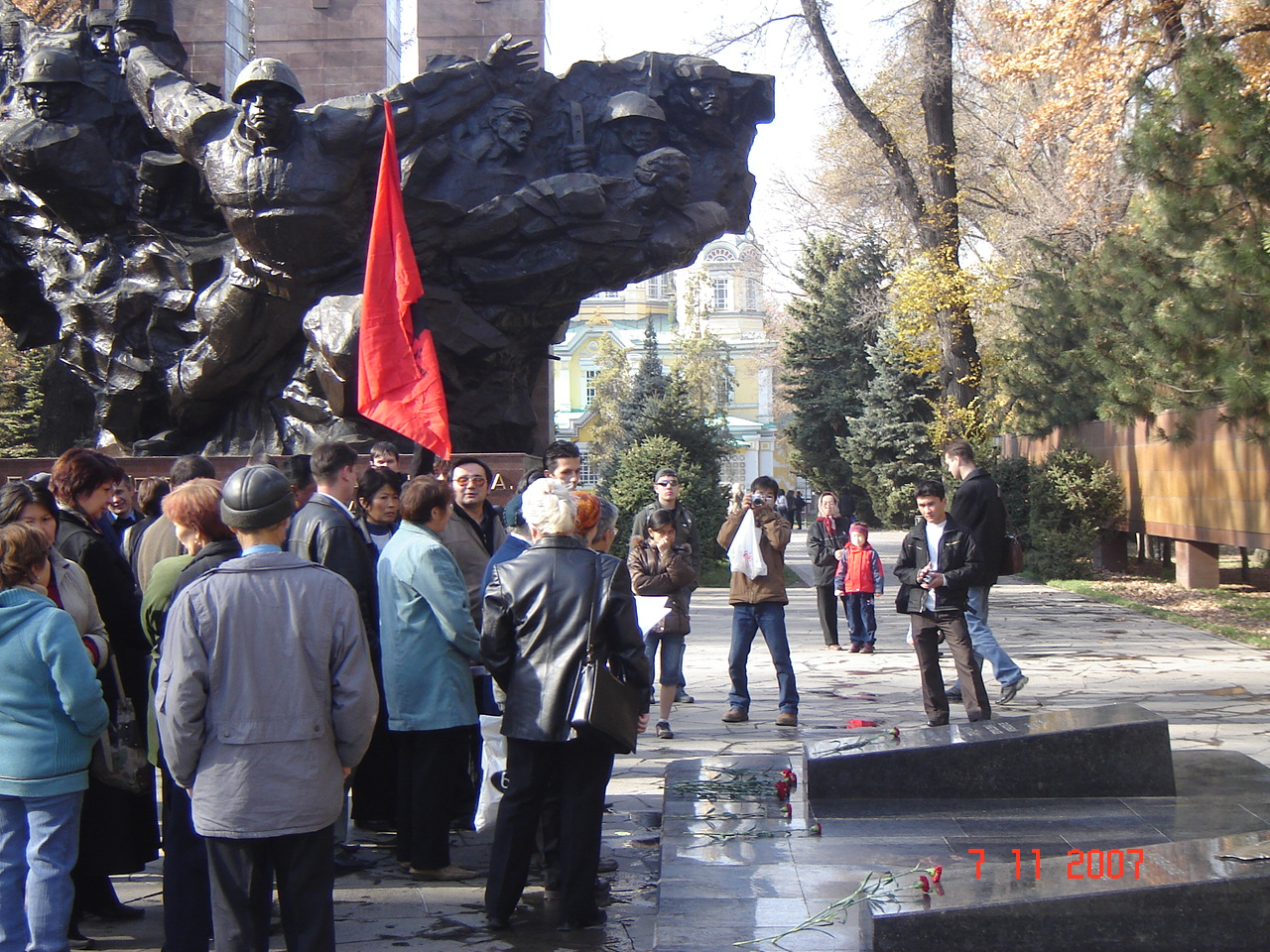
Members of the Socialist Resistance of Kazakhstan laying flowers at the memorial in Park of 28 Panfilov Guardsmen, which honours the Red Army soldiers who died in World War II

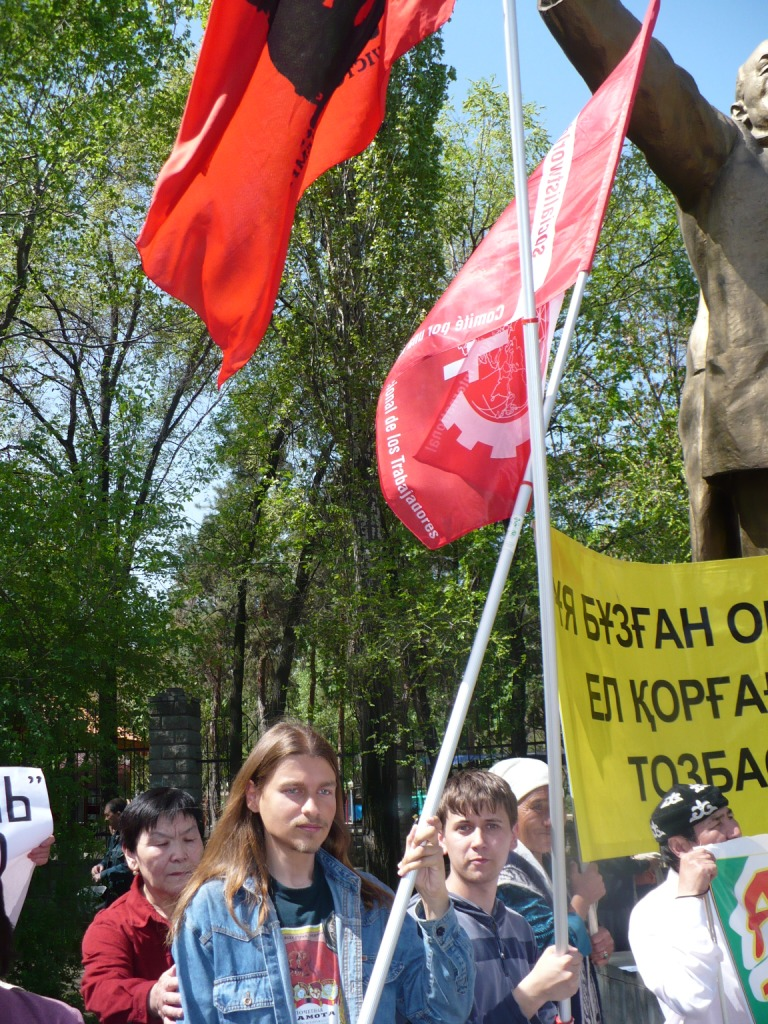
Demonstrators holding the flags of the Socialist Resistance of Kazakhstan and the Committee for a Workers' International, 26 April 2008
