= Respublika =

Respublika may refer to:

- Respublika Party of Kyrgyzstan
- Respublika (Kazakh activist organisation), first known in 2019
- Respublika (Kazakh newspaper), created in 2000 and closed in 2012
- Respublika (Lithuanian newspaper), created in 1989
- Respublika (album), an album by the Ukrainians
- Republics of Russia (Russian: республика), a type of federal subject of the Russian Federation

== See also ==
- Res publica
- Republic
- Rzeczpospolita
