= Respublika (Kazakh activist organisation) =

Kazakh activist organisation

- Established: 2019 (7 years ago)
- Types: voluntary association
- Aim: regime change
- Country: Kazakhstan

The Respublika is a Kazakh citizens' organisation that was founded on 19 June 2019 in the aftermath of the 2019 Kazakh presidential elections and is led by Kazakh blogger Bella Orynbetova. The group gained its prominence during the 2018–2020 Kazakh protests which aims for a political change in Kazakhstan.

== Creation and leadership ==
As of June 2019, one of the leaders of Respublika is Bella Orynbetova.

=== Membership ===
The group was founded by Kazakh-language bloggers. As of June 2019, Respublika had 100 members, mainly former members of the civil service.

== Ideology ==
At a press conference on 19 June 2019, Respublika representatives called for a review of the 2019 Kazakh presidential election, the release of imprisoned election protestors, and for Nur-Sultan's name to be restored to Astana, as it was prior to March 2019. About the possible entry into the newly created National Council of Public Confidence, Respublika activists put conditions, mainly the implementation of the unconditional priority of the Constitution over other laws and the abolition of all articles, laws and by-laws that restrict the fundamental rights and freedoms of citizens.

== Actions ==
In July 2019, when the National Council of Public Confidence was created by the Kazakh authorities as a compromise in relation to the presidential election protests, Respublika was not offered any seats on the 44-person council. Orynbetova stated that Respublika had communicated its "conditions for dialogue" to the authorities.

The Respublika on 16 September 2019 announced its intent to form a political party according to the activist Gülim Orazbaeva by attracting 40,000 people across regions.

On 9 November 2019, 24 Respublika activists protested in a park in Nur-Sultan against the presidential system of government after gaining permission from the authorities.

In early 2020, Orynbetova stated that lack of funds was the root problem of transforming the organisation into a political party. The Respublika considered the possibility of forming a political alliance with the opposition Nationwide Social Democratic Party (JSDP) party although because the Respublika was not fully guarantee to have representation in the national and local legislatures by the JSDP, the organisation refused to contest in the upcoming 2021 legislative elections and instead observe the electoral process with Erdindik Qanaty and Youth Information Service of Kazakhstan organisations.

== See also ==
- Oyan, Qazaqstan
