= Zhanaozen massacre =

2011 mass killing of protesters in western Kazakhstan

- Part of Kazakh opposition
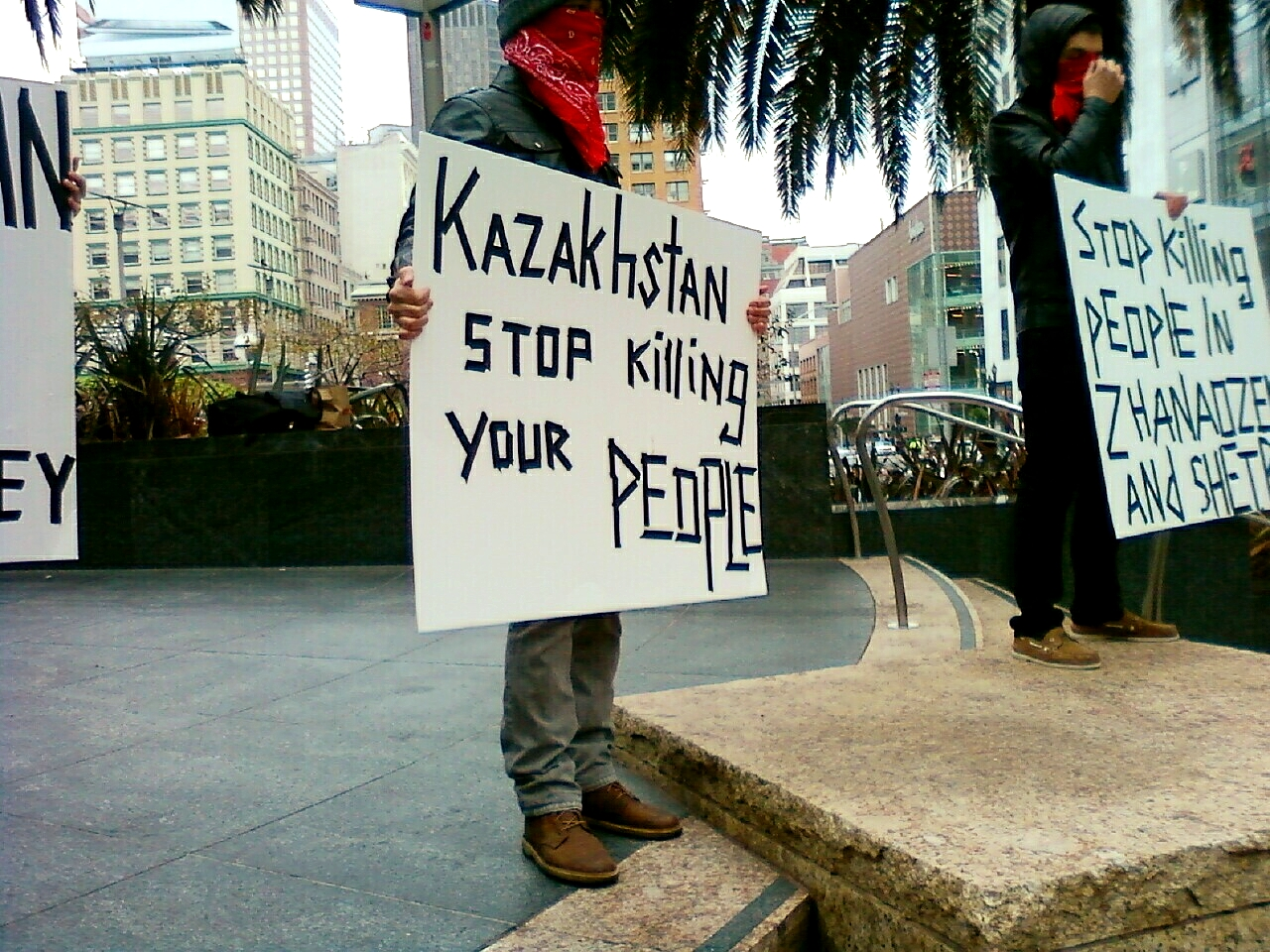
- Demonstration in San Francisco, United States, 18 December 2011
- Date: 16–17 December 2011
- Location: Mangystau Region, Kazakhstan
- Goals: Repayment of wages, political reforms
- Methods: Demonstrations, riots, strike actions, vandalism
- Result: Reshuffling of energy sector leadership

Parties
Oil workers	Government of Kazakhstan; Ministry of Internal Affairs; Internal Troops; Police; SOBR

Lead figures
No centralized leadership	Nursultan Nazarbayev; Timur Kulibayev; Askhat Daulbayev

Casualties
- Deaths: 14+
- Arrested: Multiple arrests of protesters and policemen

The Zhanaozen massacre (Kazakh: Жаңаөзен оқиғасы, romanized: Jañaözen oqiğasy) took place in Kazakhstan's western Mangystau Region over the weekend of 16–17 December 2011. At least 14 protesters were killed by police in the oil town of Zhanaozen as they clashed with police on the country's Independence Day, with unrest spreading to other towns in the oil-rich oblys, or region. According to Amnesty International, the massacre was a stark illustration of the country's poor human rights record under President Nursultan Nazarbayev.

== Zhanaozen ==
Zhanaozen has been described as "a one-industry town ... centered on the aging oilfield of Ozen". In May 2011, workers from the Ozenmunaigas oil field went on strike for unpaid danger money, higher wages and better working conditions. The strike was declared illegal by local courts and the state oil company fired nearly 1000 employees. Some of the sacked workers then started a round-the-clock occupation of the town square in protest, demanding better union representation and recognition of workers' rights. The strike continued for months without official interference. According to Radio Free Europe, the protest expanded, "with demonstrators furious over what they saw as a stranglehold on collective bargaining and labor rights by the government." In mid-December, some workers in the square began calling for the right to form independent political parties free of the government's influence.

== 16 December 2011 ==
On 16 December, there were clashes between protesters and police who were attempting to evict them from the square in preparation for an Independence Day celebration. Activists claimed security officers opened fire on unarmed demonstrators. Authorities claimed that "bandits" infiltrated the protesters and began the riots first, producing video to support their version of events. Eleven were killed, according to government officials, though opposition sources put the death toll in the dozens. General Prosecutor Askhat Daulbayev claimed that "civilians, who had gathered in the main square to celebrate the 20th anniversary of the country's independence, were attacked by a group of hooligans". The Kazakh opposition TV channel K-Plus showed the beginning of the unrest, as men purported to be oil workers ran on the stage, tipped over the speakers and pushed around civilians before police arrived. In the disturbances which followed, local government offices, a hotel and an office of the state oil company were set on fire, according to Daulbayev. Eighty-six people were injured in the clashes, according to officials. Due to a shortage of hospital beds in Zhanaozen, many were taken to be treated in Aktau, around 150 km away.

=== Testimony of victims and witnesses ===
Observers described people "running and falling, running and falling" and police "showering the people with bullets." One witness said: "Usually it's only in the movies that you see lines of soldiers with their weapons at the ready .... When you see them firsthand, it's a completely different experience. Especially when what you're seeing are OMON riot police, dressed all in black, building a barricade and rapping their clubs against their shields."

== Response ==
On the night of 16 December, police in Almaty arrested opposition activists protesting against the deaths in Zhanaozen.

Workers on the Kalamkas and Karazhanbas oilfields went on strike in response to the events at Zhanaozen.

On 17 December, a group of men in the village of Shetpe near Aktau blocked and damaged a railway line. Unrest was also reported in other cities and towns in the oblast.

President Nazarbayev visited Mangystau Region several days after the initial eruption of unrest. He said on 22 December, while in Aktau, that he would fire his son-in-law, Timur Kulibayev, over his handling of the crisis. Kulibayev was head of Kazakhstan's sovereign-wealth fund, Samruk-Kazyna, which manages many state assets, including the energy company KazMunayGas.

President Nazarbayev fired several local officials to punish them for their roles in the massacre. Also, police officers charged with firing at protesters were arrested. In addition, the regional governor resigned and was replaced with a former minister of the interior. Nazarbayev also fired the heads of the national oil company, KazMunayGaz (KMG) and its production unit. On 26 December, he carried out his promise to dismiss his son-in-law, who had been widely viewed as his likely successor. Nazarbayev also subjected Zhanaozen to a 20-day curfew and state of emergency.

=== Investigations ===
On 9 January 2012, it was reported that six Kazakh government bodies, "including the public commission, the government's body composed of civilian volunteers and officials, and several others set up by the authorities," were conducting investigations of the Zhanaozen massacre. Kazakh authorities claimed that they had asked the UN to participate in the investigations, but a spokesman for the office of the secretary-general said that the Office of the High Commissioner for Human Rights had not "been invited or requested to help investigate."

A trial of protesters began in Aktau in May 2012. Many defendants complained that they had been physically abused, and some even tortured, while in police custody and during interrogation. Some witnesses also claimed they had been threatened by police into giving false testimony. Several opposition figures were arrested in connection with the protests, including journalist Janbolat Mamai, politician Serik Sapargali, Democratic Choice of Kazakhstan leader Vladimir Kozlov, and theater director Bolat Atabaev. Human Rights Watch protested the arrests, stating that "If the Kazakh authorities can prove these political activists were involved in the violence in Zhanaozen, they shouldn't need to resort to using vague and undefined criminal allegations to imprison them ... The 'inciting social discord' charge should be dropped immediately and those against whom there is no evidence of any violent activity should be released from custody." Anti-censorship group ARTICLE 19 described the charges as "spurious" and "alarming", warning that the arrests of Atabaev and others would have "a chilling effect on freedom of expression in Kazakhstan". Amnesty International described the charge against Atabaev as "trumped-up", designating him a prisoner of conscience, "detained solely for exercising his right to freedom of expression".

Two further trials of security officials are currently taking place. In one, 5 police officers are accused of shooting demonstrators. In the other, the former chief of a police detention centre in Zhanaozen is being prosecuted in relation to the death of a suspect who was allegedly beaten to death.

=== In the media ===
Tony Blair gave damage-limitation advice to Nazarbayev and helped him craft a response which was later delivered before Western media. In July 2015 Kazakh band Nazarbayev Terror Machine released their first album "Zhanaozen" dedicated to the massacre victims.

== See also ==
- 2022 Kazakh protests
- List of protests in the 21st century
- 2018–2020 Kazakh protests
