= Serikzhan Bilash =

Kazakh human rights activist

- Серікжан Біләшұлы

The Atajurt Kazakh Human Rights (Атажұрт Еріктілері)organization was founded in April 2017 by Kydyrali Orazuly and headed it until December 12, 2018. Serikzhan Bilash joined the organization in 2018. On December 12, 2018, Kydyrali transferred the management of the Atajurt Volunteers organization to Serikzhan Bilash.: 1. https://www.azattyq.org/a/ethnic-kazakh-problems-in-china-oralman-ngo/29526689.html?utm_source=chatgpt.com 2. https://www.azattyq.org/a/why-didn-t-the-world-association-of-kazakhs-protect-kazakhs-in-xinjiang-china/30975644.html?utm_source=chatgpt.com 3. https://www.researchgate.net/publication/345164103_KYRGYZ_AND_KAZAKH_RESPONSES_TO_CHINA%27S_XINJIANG_POLICY_UNDER_XI_JINPING 4. https://www.katead.org.tr/dergiler/kazakeli-sayi-6.pdf?utm_source=chatgpt.com 5. https://abai.kz/post/60892?utm_source=chatgpt.com 6. https://jasqazaq.kz/wp-content/uploads/2017/07/pdf-30-2017-1.pdf?utm_source=chatgpt.com 7. https://qazaquni.kz/pdf/94806-2-820-18-qantar-2018?utm_source=chatgpt.com; 8. https://abai.kz/post/60892?utm_source=chatgpt.com

Personal details
- Born: 1975 (age 50–51) Lake Sairam Kazakh Autonomous Region Xinjiang Uyghur Autonomous Region PRC
- Party: Atajurt Party
- Spouse: Leila Adiljan
- Occupation: politician, human rights activist

Serikzhan Bilash (Kazakh: Серікжан Біләшұлы, Serikjan Biläşulı; born 1975) is a Kazakh public speaker, political and human rights activist, former entrepreneur, video blogger, and head of the human rights organization, Atajurt Kazakh Human Rights. He is known for his efforts to expose and combat the treatment of ethnic Kazakhs and other Turkic people in China's Xinjiang region. He is the co-founder of the human rights organization Atajurt Kazakh Human Rights, which focuses on documenting and publicizing the internment of ethnic Kazakhs in the Xinjiang re-education camps. In 2020, he was forced to leave Kazakhstan, and now currently lives in the USA.

== Activism ==
Serikzhan Bilash has been a prominent figure in raising awareness about the human rights abuse occurring in Xinjiang. His organization, Atajurt Kazakh Human Rights, has played a crucial role in documenting and publicizing the testimonies of former detainees and their families. These testimonies have highlighted cases of arbitrary detention, forced separation of families, and the suppression of cultural and religious practices among ethnic Kazakhs and other Turkic minorities in Xinjiang.

== Xinjiang re-education camps ==
The Xinjiang re-education camps have been widely criticized by international human rights organizations and governments for detaining ethnic minorities without due process and subjecting them to forced indoctrination, labor, and other human rights abuses. Bilash's work has brought significant attention to the plight of those detained in these camps. Through his organization, he has collected and disseminated numerous accounts of the conditions and treatment faced by detainees.

== Arrest and Legal Issues ==
In March 2019, Serikzhan Bilash was arrested by Kazakh authorities on charges of inciting ethnic hatred. This arrest was widely perceived as politically motivated, allegedly influenced by pressure from China. Following his arrest, Bilash was released under the condition that he cease his activism and remain in Almaty. Despite these restrictions, his earlier efforts continue to resonate and contribute to the international understanding of the situation in Xinjiang.

== Legacy ==
Serikzhan Bilash's activism has been instrumental in drawing global attention to the human rights crisis in Xinjiang. His commitment to documenting and sharing the experiences of detainees has provided valuable insights into the extent and nature of the abuses occurring in the region. Bilash remains a key figure in the fight against the persecution of ethnic minorities in Xinjiang.
