= Töle Bi Street =

Street in Almaty, Kazakhstan

Coordinates: 43°15′4.8″N 76°53′40.1″E

Töle Bi
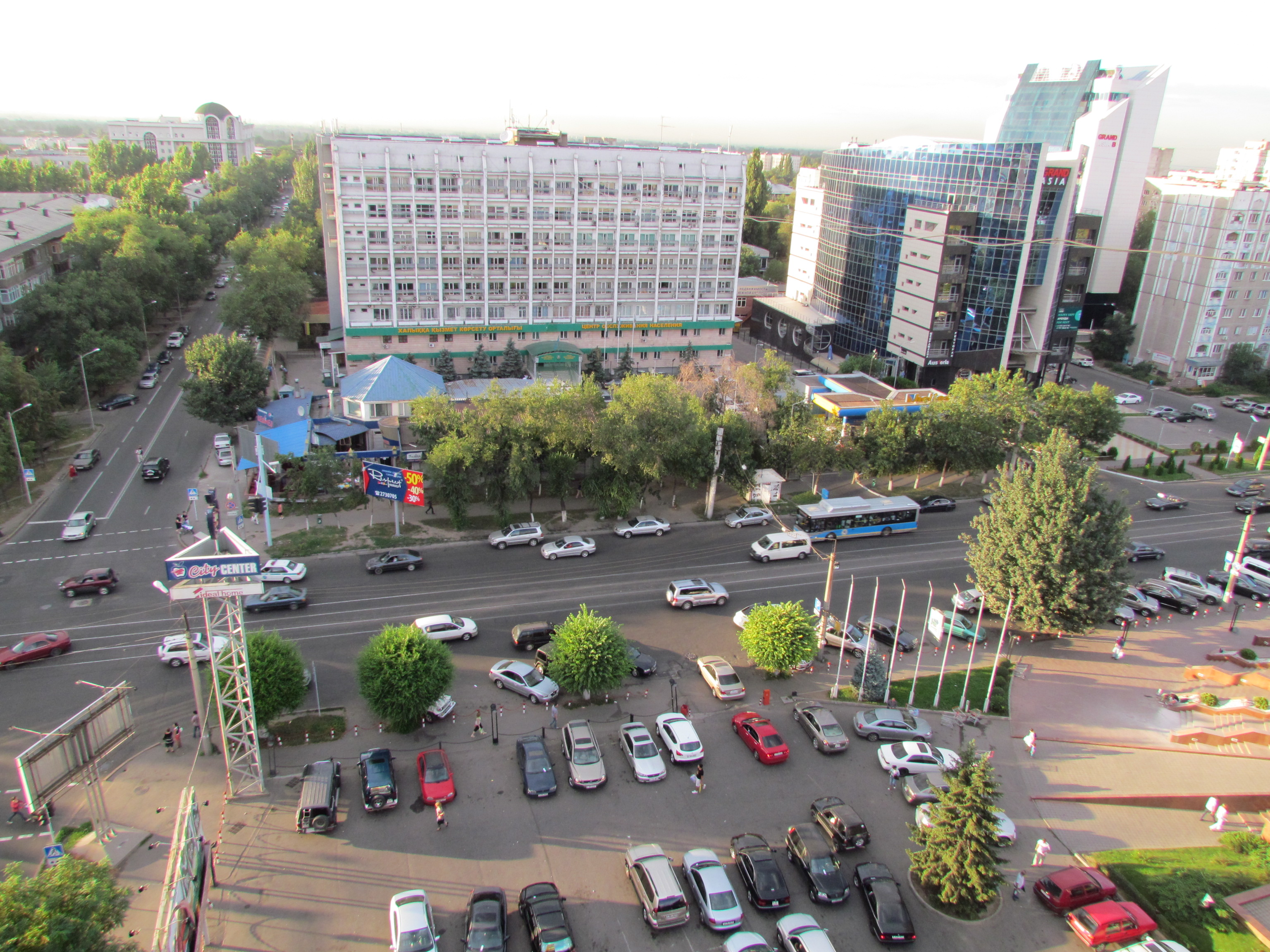
- Birds eye view of the street
- Native name: Төле би (Kazakh)
- Former name(s): Gymnazicheskaya (until 1937); Komsomolskaya (1937–1991)
- Length: 13.6 km (8.5 mi)
- Location: Almaty, Kazakhstan

Töle Bi Street (Kazakh: Төле би көшесі) is a street in Almaty. It is located in the Medeu, Almaly and Auezov districts of the city. The street is named after Kazakh poet Töle Biy.

== History ==
A gymnasium was located between the current Walikhanov Street and Dostyq Avenue, and until 1927, the street was called Gymnazicheskaya (Russian: Гимназическая; literally Gymnasium) before becoming Komsomolskaya (Russian: Комсомольская).

In the old part of the city, which was formed by the end of the 19th century, Komsomolskaya Street was completely reconstructed during the years of Soviet rule, and starting from the Esentai River it was built up in a western direction. In 1937, a tram line was laid along the street, which was partly moved during the reconstruction.

In 1991, the street got its current name which was Töle Bi.

In the fall of 2016, work was completed to extend the street to the east from Kairbekov Street to the Eastern Bypass Road (VOAD). A large multifunctional traffic intersection was put into operation at the intersection with VOAD.

== Transport ==
A dedicated bus line runs along the street from Yassaui to Jeltoqsan Street.

A tram line ran along the street from Baitursynov to Momyshuly, the corner of Marechek Street, and from Brusilovsky to Momyshuly-Marechek.
