= Dimaş Äljanov =

Kazakh political scientist

- Димаш Әлжанов
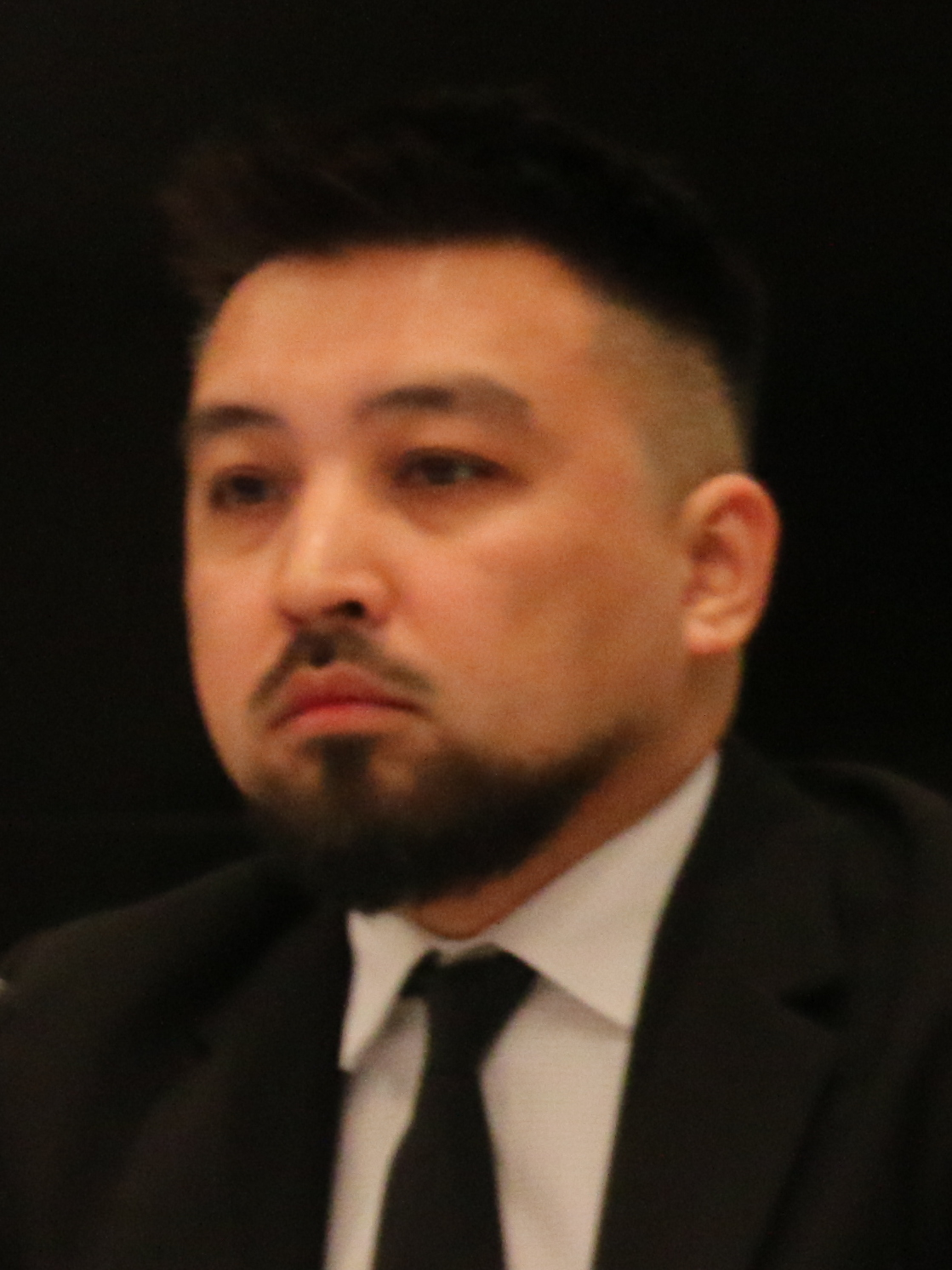
- Äljanov in 2023
- Born: c. 1986 (age 38–39); Alma-Ata, Kazakh SSR, Soviet Union
- Political party: Oyan, Qazaqstan

Dimaş Äljanov (Note: Often transliterated as Dimash Alzhanov through a Russified Romanization of Димаш Альжанов.) (Kazakh: Димаш Әлжанов; born c. 1986) is a Kazakh political scientist, human rights activist, and founder of the Almaty-based "Erkin Qazaqstan" project.

He is notable for often commenting on Kazakhstan's foreign and internal affairs, specifically Kazakh-Russian relations and the human rights crisis in Kazakhstan. He is employed by the Organization for Security and Co-operation in Europe.

== Early life and education ==
Äljanov was born in circa 1986 in Almaty.

Äljanov was educated in the United Kingdom.

== Career ==
Äljanov is a member of the unregistered opposition Oyan, Qazaqstan political party. He believed that the 2019 Kazakh presidential election was not held free and fair, and has protested against it. He also voiced opinions for a parliamentary system in Kazakhstan.

As of June 2019, Äljanov has been arrested twice for publicly protesting.

== 2024 Almaty attack ==
On 2 July 2024, at approximately 00:30, two unidentified men drove their car to block the entrance to Äljanov's residence in Almaty. According to Äljanov, they approached him, and, calling his name, tried to surround him. After the men start chasing him, Äljanov manages to run off to Dostyq Avenue, where he contacted his lawyer. Not long afterwards, he contacted the police and made the CCTV footage public.

When commenting on the incident, Äljanov speculated that it was a scare tactic targeting his social and political activities.

== Personal life ==
Äljanov lives in the Samal neighborhood of Almaty.
