= Dulat Agadil =

Kazakhstani civil and human rights activist (1977–2020)

- Дулат Ағаділ
- Born: 16 February 1977; Turgai village, Kostanay Region, Kazakh SSR, Soviet Union
- Died: 25 February 2020 (aged 43); Nur-Sultan, Kazakhstan
- Occupations: Politician, activist
- Spouse: Gülnar Qasymhanova
- Children: 6

Dulat Shakiruly Agadil (Kazakh: Дулат Шәкірұлы Ағаділ, romanized: Dulat Şäkırūly Ağadıl; 16 February 1977 – 25 February 2020) was a Kazakh civil and human rights activist.

== Biography ==
Agadil was born on 16 February 1977, in the village of Turgai. He graduated from his high school with a diploma.

== Activism ==
For the first time he became widely known, after defending mothers with many children who began to fight for their rights after the tragic death of five young children in the capital city of Nur-Sultan. In 2007, he moved to the village of Talapker in the Akmola Region where he became politically active for the first time, and was significantly involved in the establishment and development of the village. Agadil repeatedly spoke for the civil rights and freedoms of Kazakhs, including for political prisoners and for free and fair elections. He criticized the authorities for which he was subjected to multiple arrests. He fought in the opposition against the government, which also led to the resignation of President of Kazakhstan Nursultan Nazarbayev in March 2019.

Agadil was arrested several times. However, he managed to escape from custody in November, but voluntarily came to the building of the General Prosecutor's Office in Nur-Sultan, where he was detained. In December, he caused a medical emergency by swallowing nails and screws, and was released from custody. Dulat escaped in order to draw the attention of the authorities regarding his unreasonable persecution, where in one month he was subjected to administrative punishments five times.

== Final detention and death ==
In February 2020, a squad of plainclothes police took Agadil from his family home. The next day, the Nur-Sultan city police reported that Agadil had died in a pre-trial detention center due to suspected heart failure. After that, an investigation was initiated into his death and a forensic medical examination was ordered.

Agadil's relatives published a video in which they examined his body before burial. The preliminary results of the forensic medical examination stated that there were no bruises on the body, although the published video shows that there were abrasions on the body and the palms of the hands were blackened.

== Aftermath ==
About 1000 persons attended the funeral of Agadil in the village of Talapker. The U.S. State Department expressed deep concern over his death and expected a full and thorough investigation on the circumstances.

Three days after his death, the President of Kazakhstan Kassym-Jomart Tokayev, without waiting for the end of the investigation and the official results of the forensic medical examination, made a statement in which he supported the initial version voiced by the police:

“Given the great public outcry, I carefully read this case. I can say with confidence that, unfortunately, the activist [Dulat]Agadil passed away as a result of heart failure. To make any claims counter to this is to go against the truth. No matter what his views, he was primarily a human being."

Hundreds of politicians, human rights defenders and activists expressed doubts about the reliability of this version. According to political scientist Dosym Satpayev, the death of Dulat Agadil, along with other negative events for the authorities, including the 2020 Dungan–Kazakh ethnic clashes, became the reason for the release of the former head of Kazatomprom, Mukhtar Dzhakishev from prison.

== Personal life ==
Dulat Agadil is survived by his wife, Gülnar and six children: daughter Qymbat, and sons Nurbolat, Aibolat, Janbolat, Qasymhan and Abylaihan. On 11 November 2020, Agadil's son Janbolat was stabbed to death during a mass brawl in the Koktal microdistrict of Nur-Sultan.

During his life, Agadil planned to build a house for his family, but due to his death, he could not bring this plan to life. After his death, his close friends, associates, activists and all concerned citizens of Kazakhstan from all over the world, jointly built a house for his family by providing money, information support, and directly taking part in the construction. By the end of construction, on 8 August 2020, a memorial dinner was organised, which was attended by several hundred people from all over the country. After the end of the lunch, the audience moved to Agadil's grave to read a prayer, as a result of which about a hundred participants were subjected to administrative fines, detentions and arrests on charges of the event not being coordinated with the authorities.
