= Oyan, Qazaqstan =

Civil rights movement founded in Kazakhstan

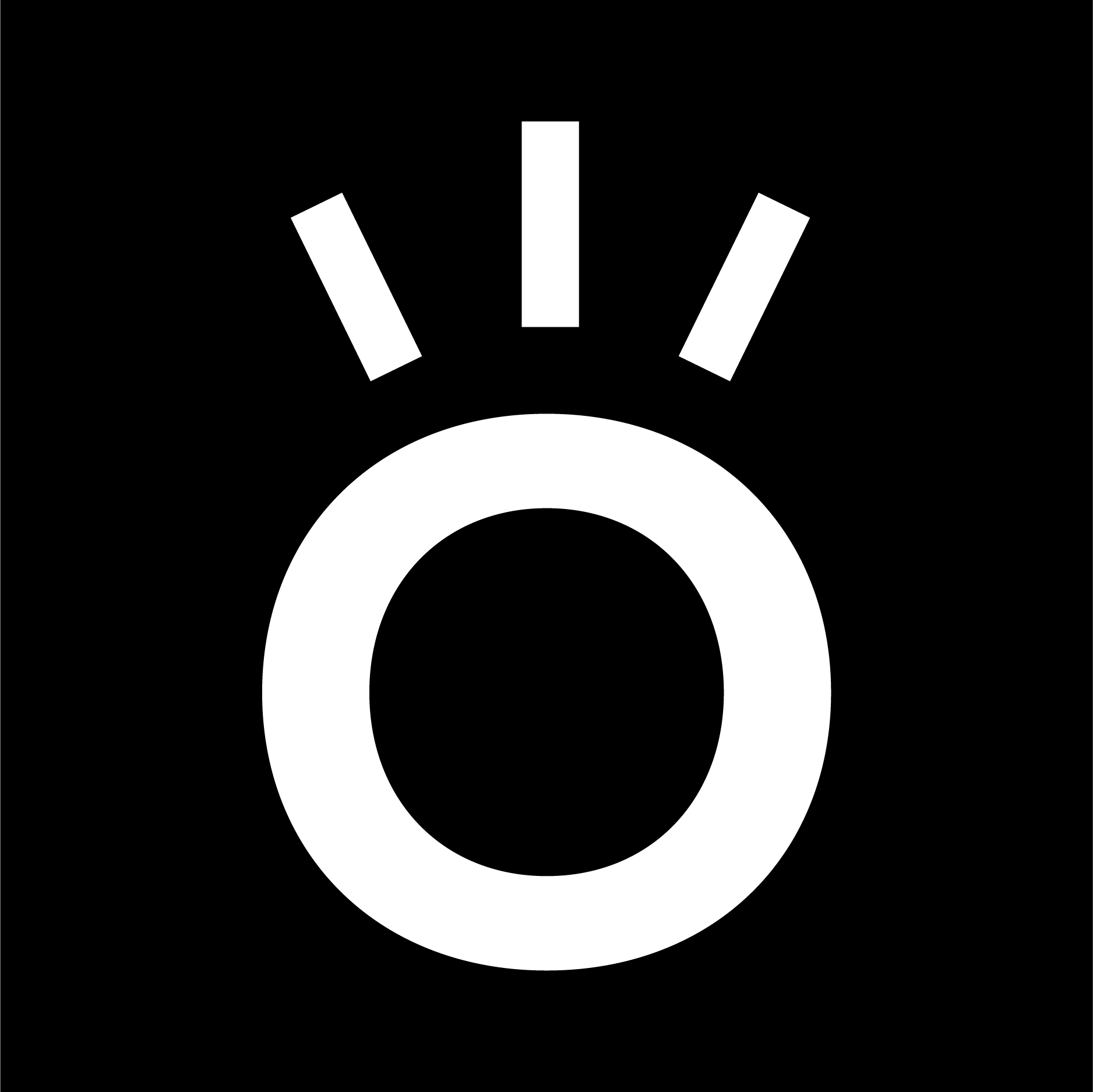
- Established: 5 June 2019 (7 years ago)
- Types: voluntary association
- Country: Kazakhstan

Oyan, Qazaqstan (Kazakh Cyrillic: Оян, Қазақстан; lit. 'Wake Up, Kazakhstan'; OQ) is a civil rights movement founded in Almaty, Kazakhstan.

== Creation ==
The formation of Oyan, Qazaqstan was announced 5 June 2019, triggered by the arrest, trial and conviction of activists Beybarys Tolymbekov and Asya Tulesova. The group's name is based on a poetry book written by Mirjaqip Dulatuli (Mir Yakub Dulatov) in 1909 that was immediately confiscated by the Tsarist authorities, "a celebrated verse of defiance". The hashtag "#IWokeUp" video (Kazakh: #MenOyandym) meme campaign involving actor and activist Anuar Nurpeisov, released the previous week, was a factor in the creation of OQ.

== Aims ==
Oyan, Qazaqstan's concerns are fundamental political reform and human rights. OQ is not a political party and does not seek political power for itself. It refuses cooperation with political parties in Kazakhstan and elsewhere. OQ published a nine-point list of its specific aims, including "an end to political repression, reforming the distribution of power between the branches of government, free elections in line with international standards, and a system of self-governance at the local level".

== Actions ==
OQ has been involved in several of the 2019 Kazakh protests. On 30 August 2019, Kazakhstan's Constitution Day, OQ staged rallies in several cities around the country.

== See also ==
- Dimaş Äljanov, Kazakh political scientist and notable member of Oyan, Qazaqstan
- Respublika, another Kazakh activist organisation
