= Youth Information Service of Kazakhstan =

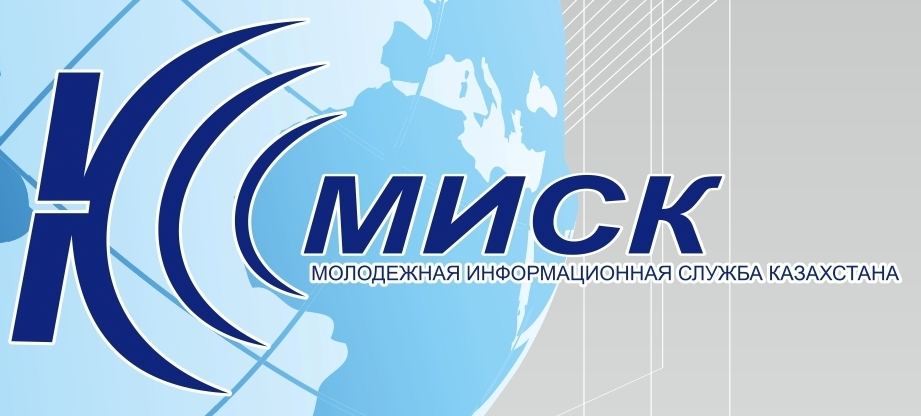
- Founded: July 1998
- Purpose: Youth
- Location: Almaty, Kazakhstan
- Website: https://misk.org.kz

The Public Fund Youth Information Service of Kazakhstan (YISK) is a nonprofit organization that unites young initiative people who strive to contribute their knowledge, energy and intellect to the development and prosperity of Kazakhstan.

Youth Information Service was organized by young citizens of Kazakhstan students of higher educational institutes in July 1998 in Almaty.

The Public Fund has its branches and representative office in 9 regions of Kazakhstan: Almaty, Astana, Karaganda, Taraz, Oral, Shimkent, Kyzylorda, Semey, Kokshetau.

== Mission ==
The development of civic initiatives among Kazakhstan's youth through education, information exchange and cooperation of young organizations and young people and their involvement in social activity.

== Principles ==
Mobilization of the entire national internal resources for country development requires a formation of the effective youth policy system. It is necessary to create mechanisms for the internal investments to the social sector of the country, when any citizen is able to contribute his or her expertise, energy and innovations to the development of Kazakhstan. Nowadays, it is necessary to build a system of the education and progress in order to bring up public managers of new formation that would correspond to the demands of the new century. At present, when knowledge and innovation are highly valuable, the youth is to be the main strategic resource for the prosperity of the country.

== Principal activities ==
Social Projects

- Advocacy Campaign
- Lobbying
- Civic Education
- Charity

Information programs

- Media monitoring
- Creating and maintaining databases
- Conduct ratings
- Youth media and websites

Educational programs

- Training seminars
- Training and workshops
- Workshops and Schools
- Assist in the development of voluntary movement

Youth events

- Round tables
- Forums and discussion
- Promotions and campaigns

Research and Expertise
