= Internal Troops of Kazakhstan =

Internal Troops of Kazakhstan Қазақстан Iшкi iстер министрлiгi iшкi әскері
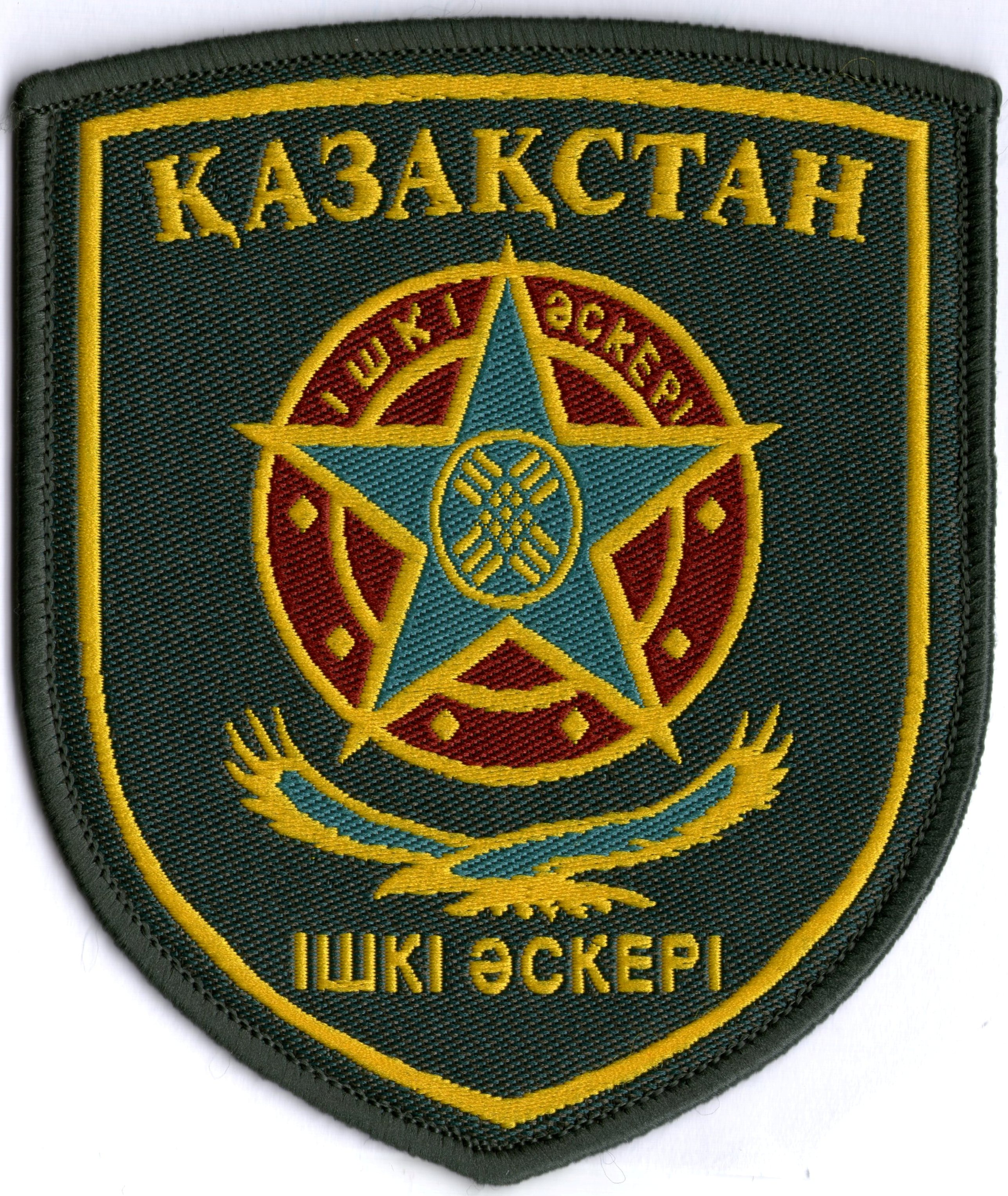
- Patch of the Internal Troops

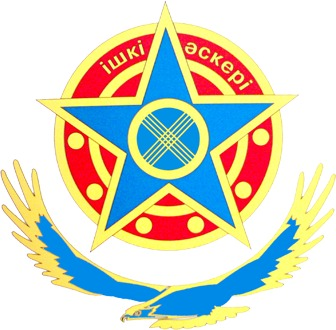
- Emblem of the Internal Troops

- Flag of the Internal Troops

Agency overview
- Formed: 10 January 1992
- Preceding agency: Internal Troops of the Soviet Union
- Dissolved: 21 April 2014
- Superseding agency: National Guard of Kazakhstan

Jurisdictional structure
- Operations jurisdiction: Kazakhstan
- Governing body: Ministry of Internal Affairs
- General nature: Gendarmerie

Operational structure
- Headquarters: Almaty (until 1997); Astana (since 1997)

Notables
- Significant operations: Kazakh opposition; Zhanaozen massacre

The Internal Troops of Kazakhstan (Kazakh: Қазақстан Iшкi iстер министрлiгi iшкi әскері, romanized: Qazaqstan Işki ister ministrligi işki äskerı; Russian: Внутренние войска МВД Казахстана) was a militarized police force that operated in the Republic of Kazakhstan from 1992 to 2014. The Internal Troops formed the basis for what is now the National Guard of Kazakhstan.

== History ==
The Internal Troops was formed by order of the President Nursultan Nazarbayev on 10 January 1992. It was the Kazakh successor to the Soviet Internal Troops and was formed on the basis of Internal Troops based in the Kazakh SSR. It immediately grew effective in its role in suppressing armed domestic conflicts that were mostly caused by terrorism. In March of that same year, the government founded the Republican Guard on the basis of a police unit of the Internal Troops deployed in the Kaskelen District of Almaty. The Internal Troops were disbanded on 21 April 2014 by government orders, transforming the once Soviet-era agency into the present-day National Guard.

== Missions ==
The missions of the Kazakh Internal Troops are as follows:

- Guard important cargo during transportation
- Guard of corrective institutions and escort convicts and detainees
- Maintain of a social order and stop violations the law that risk the ensurance of public safety
- Maintain a state of alertness during national emergency situations (e.g. natural disasters)
- Dismantle illegal armed formations
- Prevent domestic and foreign terrorism on Kazakh soil

== Leadership Structure ==
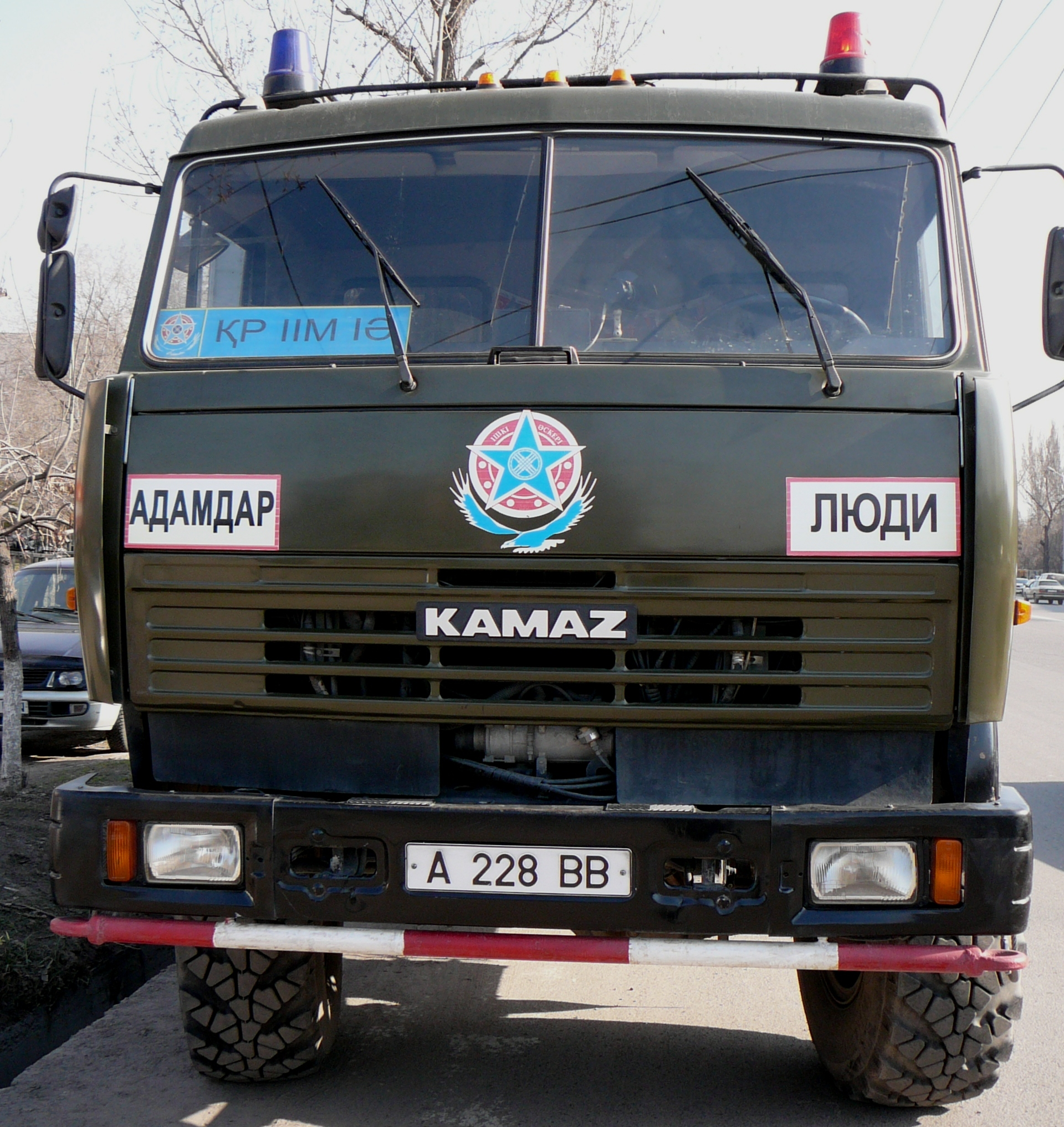
A truck of the Internal Troops.

The Commander-in-Chief of the Internal Troops was the seniormost post in the Internal Troops, acting as the commanding officer of the entire branch. The incumbent was appointed and dismissed by the President of the Republic of Kazakhstan and reported directly to him/her through the Minister of Internal Affairs. The assistant to the commander-in-chief and the head of all the headquarters directorates was known as the Chief of Staff.

== Anthem of the Internal Troops ==
English Translation
When he went on a journey, criticized his son,
He smiled like a smile.
He gave his son back to the dark road,
The Lord asked for a way to go.
We were invited by ancestors
The sons in the inner army are brave boys.
Stomach up, stubborn heart
Hero of the heroic country
Hero of the heroic country
Riding on the hill, the hooves are strong,
The path to happiness was gone.
Even the elders who handle the palace,
He went to the cliff and blessed him.
Like a fly, a moon,
He wanted an early road to his country.
Under the blue flag of a sunny boy,
The cost of freedom is a blessing.
