= Aidos Sadyqov =

Kazakhstani journalist and opposition figure (1968–2024)

Aydos Sadyqov
- Айдос Садықов
- Born: 9 December 1968; Karabutak, Aktobe Region, Kazakh SSR, Soviet Union
- Died: 2 July 2024 (aged 55); Kyiv, Ukraine
- Occupations: Journalist, politician
- Years active: 2005–2024
- Spouse: Natalia Sadykova
- Children: 3

Aidos Jandosūly Sadyqov (Kazakh: Айдос Жандосұлы Садықов, [ɑjˈdos sɑˈdɯqɯf]; 9 December 1968 – 2 July 2024) was a Kazakh journalist, oppositionist figure, and head of the online media outlet BÄSE.

Sadykov was known for his opposition to former and current Presidents of Kazakhstan Nursultan Nazarbayev and Kassym-Jomart Tokayev, the latter of whom he accused of holding a pro-Russian stance. In July 2024, he was assassinated in Kyiv, Ukraine, and his widow, Natalia Sadyqova, became the sole author of the BÄSE channel.

== Biography ==
Sadyqov was born in the village of Karabutak in the Aktobe Region of modern-day Kazakhstan, near the Russian border. He attended a Russian-language school but spoke Kazakh at home. He graduated from the History Department of Aktobe Pedagogical Institute and engaged in business, trade, and worked in the oil extraction industry.

In Kazakhstan, Sadyqov was a prominent opposition figure. He opposed former President Nazarbayev and led the local branch of the oppositionist National Social Democratic Party Azat. He co-founded the civic movement "Gastat" and established independent trade unions at the oil company "CNPC-Aktobemunaigas". Furthermore, he was also the co-chair of the Jusan social-liberal party.

In 2005, Sadyqov began his political career by heading the Aktobe branch of the opposition party Nağyz Aq Jol, which aimed to enter Parliament. In 2010, he left the party because its leaders considered him too radical and uncontrollable. The same year, he participated in protests calling for Nazarbayev's resignation, the release of political prisoners, and opposition to land sales, which were not formally sanctioned by the Kazakh authorities. Sadyqov faced several criminal charges, including accusations of counterfeiting money, assault, and resisting the police. He was subjected to a month of forced psychiatric evaluation. In 2010, he was sentenced to two years in prison for hooliganism, during which Kazakh security services attempted to recruit him, but he refused.

At the beginning of 2014, Kazakh authorities filed a case against his journalist wife. In April 2014, he moved with his family from Kazakhstan to Ukraine, settling in Kyiv, where he continued his oppositionist activities. That same year, Sadykov announced the creation of an international battalion within the Armed Forces of Ukraine.

=== Later activities ===
On 14 October 2020, the Shevchenkivskyi District Court of Kyiv initiated proceedings on a lawsuit by LLC "ABS-Munay" against Aidos and Natalia Sadyqova to protect the company's reputation and refute false information.

In 2022, he supported the nationwide protests in Kazakhstan. After 24 February 2022, the BÄSE channel actively reported on and condemned the Russian invasion of Ukraine. The channel reported on the creation of the "Turan" battalion in the Ukrainian Armed Forces, consisting of volunteers from Central Asia and the Caucasus.

In the fall of 2023, Aydos and Natalia Sadykova were declared wanted in Kazakhstan for "inciting social, national, or religious discord."

== Assassination ==
On 18 June 2024, an attack was carried out on Sadykov on Viktor Yarmola Street in Kyiv. The assailant approached the car in which Sadykov and his wife were driving and shot him in the temple. The journalist, in critical condition with a head injury, was taken to hospital.

A pre-trial investigation into attempted murder was initiated. Kazakh President Kassym-Jomart Tokayev stated that Kazakh law enforcement was ready to investigate the attempt to "establish the truth". Sadykov's wife, Natalia, named Tokayev as the "main beneficiary" of her husband's potential death. Sadykov fell into a deep coma and died on 2 July, at the age of 55.

=== Investigation ===
On 21 June, the Ukrainian police stated that the attack had been carried out by two Kazakh citizens who had arrived in Kyiv on 2 June from Poland. Altay Jaqambaev (born 9 February 1988) and Meiram Qarataev, an employee of the Kostanay Region Police Department in northern Kazakhstan (born 9 May 1991), were charged in absentia and placed on an international wanted list. Both left Ukraine for Moldova on the day of the attack.

On 22 June, Altay Jaqambaev surrendered to authorities in Kazakhstan, where he was detained and questioned. On 27 June, Kazakhstan announced its refusal to extradite the suspects to Ukraine.

== Family ==
Aydos was married to Natalia Sadyqova, they had three children.
