= Military Police (Kazakhstan) =

Military police of the Republic of Kazakhstan

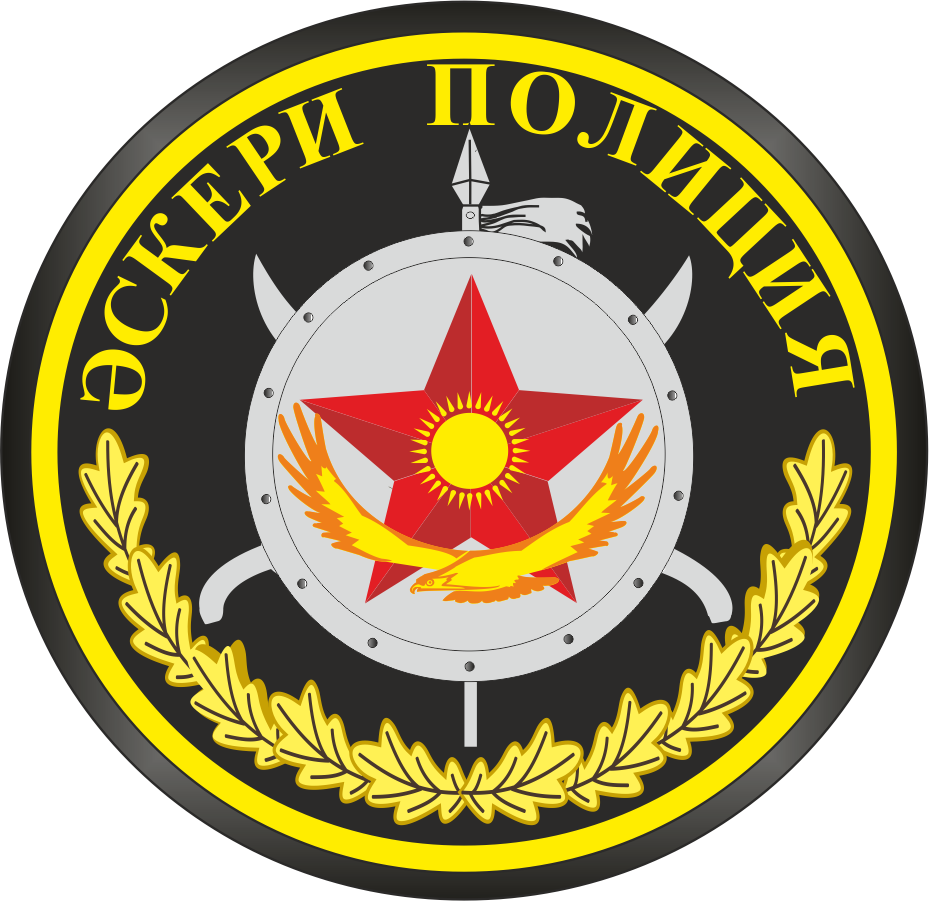
- Shoulder Patch
- Active: 1997-present
- Country: Kazakhstan
- Branch: Armed Forces of Kazakhstan
- Type: Military Police
- Part of: Ministry of Defense
- Garrison/HQ: Astana
- Engagements: 2022 Kazakh protests

Commanders
- Current commander: Colonel Erik Bakirbaev

The Military Police of the Armed Forces of Kazakhstan (Kazakh: Қазақстан Республикасы Қарулы Күштері Әскери полициясы, romanized: Qazaqstan Respublikasy Qaruly Küşterı Äskeri politsiiasy, Russian: Военная полиция Вооруженных Сил Республики Казахстан) is the military police branch of the Republic of Kazakhstan. It falls under the direct command of the Main Directorate of the Military Police under the Ministry of Defense. The military police are special military units that are organizationally part of the armed forces and other security agencies to carry out the functions of ensuring law and order in these bodies just like the civilian police.

The military police is under the joint jurisdiction of the Ministry of Defense, the Ministry of Internal Affairs and the National Security Committee, all of which manage the activities of the military police.

== History ==
The first military police units were established in accordance with a directive of General of the Army Mukhtar Altynbayev on 6 March 1997. Their purpose was to regulate military traffic and maintain law and order in the Armed Forces, since military discipline is essential to ensure national security.

It was established in accordance with a presidential decree signed by President Nursultan Nazarbayev on 22 April 1997. This was done as part of a reform of the system of national law enforcement agencies within Kazakhstan, which had only declared its independence six months earlier.

Two years later, military police units were formed as part of the Border Service of the National Security Committee and the Internal Troops of Kazakhstan. Official rules and regulations were first introduced into the military police in February 2005. In 2009, it was reported that as a result of the work carried out by the military police, the armed forces saw a reduction in crime of more than 20%.

== Tasks ==
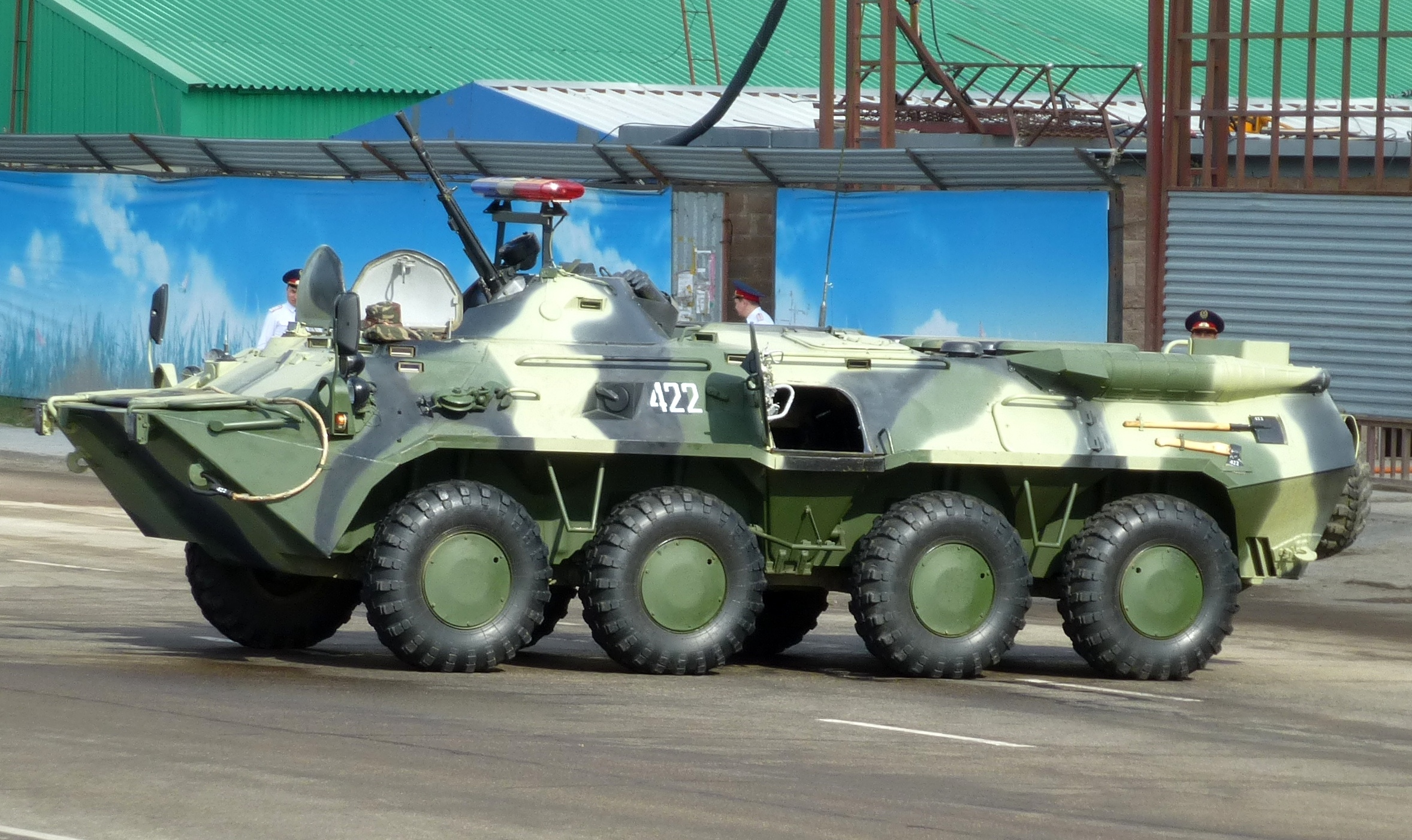
A BTR-80 of the military police.

The main tasks of the military police of Kazakhstan are:

- To ensure law and order in the military.
- To implement internal control over the organisation of daily activities in garrison services in military units.
- To detect and disclose crimes and offences within the framework of Kazakh law.
- To identify circumstances contributing to the commission of crimes and offences.
- To conduct pre-trial investigations in accordance with the criminal procedure legislation of the country.
- To ensure the road safety of vehicles of the national security agencies and the military.
- To detain servicemen in connection with violations of civilian and military law.
- To implement the use of relevant documents and state registration plates, and to conduct mandatory technical inspections of motor vehicles registered with the military police.

Additionally, there are a couple more tasks that specifically pertain to the military police of the National Security Committee:

- The investigation of criminal offences committed by military personnel.
- The protection of NSC facilities, including warehouses that store weapons, special equipment, security systems, and other technical means, as well as ensuring access control and internal facility regimes.

== Structure ==
Today, the Military Police of Kazakhstan consists of the following assets:

- Four military police units
- Sixteen regional divisions
- Four divisions
- A training centre for military police

== Uniform ==
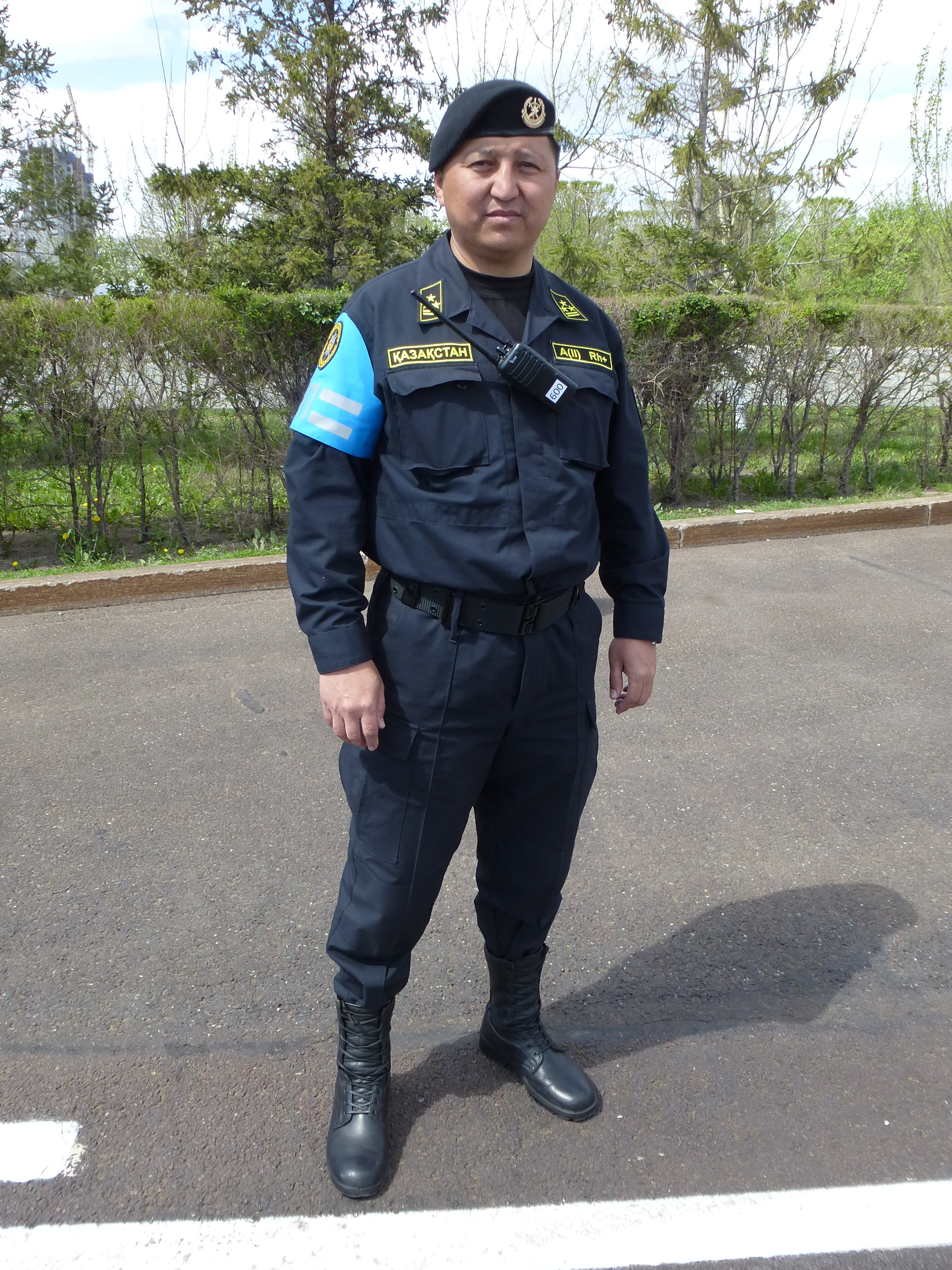
A Colonel in the military police wearing the casual uniform.

The overall uniform of the military police consists of the following variants:

- Full dress uniform
- Casual uniform
- Combat uniform

All three have a summer and winter version to accommodate any type of weather. The dress uniform is black and consists of a peaked cap (or an ushanka during the winter), trousers, a black tie, and a ceremonial belt of golden colour, along with leather and white gloves. This uniform is worn during military parades and official functions. The casual uniform, which is worn on a daily basis, utilises a military beret and/or papakha for headgear. The combat uniform consists of all camouflage clothing items and is worn during regular duties.

== Commanders ==
- Major General Shamil Khakimov (?)
- Major General Timur Dandybaev (2011-2017)
- Colonel Marat Nurymbet (2020-present)

== See also ==
- Military Police (Russia)
