= Mukhtar Dzhakishev =

Kazakh businessman

- Мұхтар Жәкішев
- Born: 28 June 1963 (age 63); Alma-Ata, Kazakh SSR, Soviet Union
- Education: Moscow Engineering Physics Institute
- Occupation: Businessman

Mukhtar Dzhakishev (Kazakh: Мұхтар Жәкiшев, romanized: Mūhtar Jäkışev; born 28 June 1963) is a Kazakh businessman and the former head of Kazatomprom.

Dzhakishev graduated from the Moscow Engineering Physics Institute in 1986, majoring in the Physics of Solid Bodies. He remained there until 1990 to complete post-graduate work. From 1992 to 1997 he served as the head of Butya, then as the head of Alautransgaz from 1997 to 1998. He became the head of Kazakhstan's National Atomic Company (Kazatomprom), the position he held until 2001, when he became the Deputy Minister of Energy and Mineral Resources. In 2002 he once again became the head of Kazatomprom.

In late May 2009, he was removed from his position and arrested on charges of embezzling funds from the country's uranium industry. According to the country's National Security Committee, Dzhakishev allegedly appropriated 60% of Kazakhstan's uranium deposits as his personal property, which would amount to tens of billions of dollars. Several Kazakh entrepreneurs have criticized the arrest as being politically motivated, and 22 executives signed an open letter criticizing the arrest's effects on the business environment in the country. In March 2010, he was sentenced to 14 years in a high security penitentiary. In 2009, under Dzhakishev's leadership, Kazatomprom achieved world leadership in uranium production. Dzhakishev has also been deprived of the right to occupy government positions for the following seven years, and was stripped of the Order of Kurmet, a prestigious Kazakh state award.

He was released from prison on March 3, 2020.
