= Janbolat Mamai =

Kazakh journalist and activist (born 1988)

- Жанболат Мамай
- Mamai in 2021

Leader of Democratic Party
- Incumbent
- Assumed office 16 October 2019

Personal details
- Born: 15 June 1988 (age 38) Alma-Ata, Kazakh SSR, Soviet Union
- Occupation: Journalist, political activist

Janbolat Mamai (Note: Often transliterated as Zhanbolat Mamay through a Russified Romanization of Жанболат Мамай.) (Kazakh: Жанболат Мамай) (born 15 June 1988) is a Kazakh journalist, opposition leader, and political activist who serves as the leader of the Democratic Party of Kazakhstan, and was previously the editor of the Tribuna newspaper. Since his first arrest in 2012, Mamai has become a prominent figure in the Kazakh opposition.

== Early life and education ==
Mamai was born in the city of Alma-Ata (now Almaty) on June 15, 1988 to a family of teachers.

In 2007, he completed an internship at the National and Kapodistrian University of Athens. Mamai then continued his studies at the Kazakh Ablai Khan University of International Relations and World Languages at the Department of English Philology.

== Political activities ==
=== Journalist at Zhas Alash ===
Janbolat Mamai previously worked for the newspaper Zhas Alash. In his articles, Mamai discussed social problems and alleged corruption among high-ranking government officials. In a series titled “Billionaires. Who are they?" Mamai criticized many of Kazakhstan's richest figures.

=== Zhanaozen ===
In December 2011, Mamai descended onto the city of Zhanaozen to provide media coverage of the Zhanaozen massacre. The following June, Mamai was arrested on charges of "inciting social hatred" and "calling for the overthrow of the public and constitutional order". He personally covered and commented in other publications about the rights of protesting oil workers and criticized the authorities regarding the prosecution of oil industry protesters, referring to the Constitution of the Republic of Kazakhstan and international laws that Kazakhstan has ratified and which guarantee citizens the right to peaceful rallies and protests. After being detained for nearly a month, Mamai was released from prison for "repentance", although Mamai himself denied repenting any of his actions.

Following his release from prison, Mamai was called as a witness in the trials of various people arrested during the Zhanaozen massacre.

=== Journalist at Tribuna ===
Beginning in September 2012, Mamai served as the editor of the newspaper Tribuna, which published highly critical materials regarding the Kazakhstan's government and a government officials. The main topic of the newspaper was the observance of human rights and political freedoms in Kazakhstan. Over the period of its existence, the publication has been repeatedly subjected to lawsuits against its publications. Several times, Tribuna was unable to pay for lawsuits, and shut down, only to then came out under a different name.

While Mamai served as editor of Tribuna, the newspaper was hit with a libel fine after accusing a government official of embezzling money meant to go to hosting the 2011 Asian Winter Games. The newspaper supported imprisoned activists Max Bokaev and Talgat Ayan, who were sentenced to 5 years in prison for participating in a peaceful protest in Atyrau. Mamai's car was also vandalized while he served as the newspaper's editor, which some Kazakh advocates have linked to his role in the newspaper.

==== Arrest and trial ====
On 10 February 2017, the Anti-Corruption Agency of the Republic of Kazakhstan launched a raid targeting the office of the Tribuna and many of its senior staff. The operation included the search of the apartments of the newspaper's senior staff, including then-editor Janbolat Mamai, Mamai's wife and the newspaper's acting editor Inga Imanbai, the relatives of Inga Imanbai, the newspaper's accountant, the founder of the company which published the Tribuna, in the apartments and the house of politician Tulegen Zhukeyev. The premise for the Agency's action pertained to the controversial investigation regarding the alleged embezzlement of money by Mukhtar Ablyazov from BTA Bank.

Mamai was accused of being an accomplice of Ablyazov, and was charged with money laundering. On 11 February 2017, he released a statement denying the charges against him, and calling the arrest politically motivated. Mamai was arrested that day, and was placed in pre-trial detention. The presiding judge sentenced Mamai to two months in pre-trial detention, pending an investigation. Mamai's arrest was criticized by many human rights organizations and other NGOs, including Amnesty International, Reporters Without Borders, the Committee to Protect Journalists, and Freedom House. Several members of the European Parliament also condemned Mamai's arrest.

Mamai's arrest was held by an appeals court in Almaty on 20 February.

On 21 February, Mamai released a statement through his lawyer in which he said that he was transferred from a pre-trial detention center to a prison, was beaten in a prison cell to the point of losing consciousness, and that his guards threatened to "get" him. Mamai's statement also declared he had no suicidal intentions, and said that if he died, it would be murder. The statement claimed that prison guards made death threats against Mamai's wife, Inga Imanbai, over the phone, and that the guards extorted her for money totaling 200,000 Kazakhstani tenge (although they initially demanded 2,000,000 tenge). The statement also claimed that Mamai's prison guards demanded that Mamai abandon politics.

On 7 September 2017, the Medeu District Court in Almaty sentenced Mamai to a restricted three year sentence, in which he would be freed from prison, but banned from conducting journalism, have his freedom of movement restricted, and would perform 120 hours of community service.

=== Democratic Party of Kazakhstan and subsequent activities ===
Following his three year period of restrictions, Mamai unsuccessfully attempted to get his Democratic Party of Kazakhstan registered with the government. Eurasianet reports that Mamai faced sustained harassment while attempting to register the party.

In April 2021, Mamai wrote a piece accusing former Äkim of Almaty Bauyrjan Baibek of accumulating large amounts of wealth through his family's ownership of about 100 companies. Mamai wrote that of these approximately 100 companies, about half went bankrupt, and just 10 or so were registered in his family's name. Baibek personally responded to Mamai's claims, calling them false and pledging to take legal action against Mamai.

In January 2022, he was detained for participating in protest actions 2022 Kazakh unrest, and on March 16, Zhanbolat was detained on charges of insulting a government official and spreading deliberately false information. Mamai was handed a six year suspended sentence in April 2023, during which he would be prohibited from participating in political activity and journalism. Mamai pledged to appeal the sentence.
