= Democratic Party of Kazakhstan =

Political party in Kazakhstan

Democratic Party Демократиялық Партиясы
- Abbreviation: DP
- Leader: Janbolat Mamai
- Founded: 16 October 2019
- Headquarters: Almaty, Kazakhstan
- Ideology: E-democracy; Pro-Europeanism
- Colors: Blue; White

The Democratic Party of Kazakhstan (Kazakh: Қазақстанның Демократиялық Партиясы, romanized: Qazaqstannyñ Demokratialyq Partiasy, QDP) is an unregistered political party in Kazakhstan that was founded and led by Janbolat Mamai, former journalist and a political activist. The party aims to create an independent, strong, and economically developed state which respects human rights in accordance with the rule of law.

== History ==
At the press conference held on 16 October 2019 in Almaty, Janbolat Mamai announced the creation of new political party, citing the new need for an independent political force. He stressed that Kazakhstan is in a need for real political reforms such as change in law on political parties and protests, release of all political parties in which Mamai called for the state to apologise and pay them compensation. From there, he outlined plans in submitting documents to the Ministry of Justice for registration and that the founding congress for the party would be held within near future where the charter and programme would be presented. Amongst speakers at the conference were Tolegen Jukeev, Sergei Duvanov and Asel Janabaeva.

On 26 December 2019, the QDP initiative group applied for registration after garnering more than thousand signatures. Party member Inga Imanbai expressed hope that the registration by accepted by the Justice Ministry in order for the party to hold a congress per requirement to form a political party and if not, then it would based solely for politically motivated reason and that the party would continue to work further. As the initiative group became registered shortly, QDP leader Janbolat Mamai announced that a constituent congress would be held on 22 February 2020. During that period, the party complained about alleged political pressure and harassment on the supporters. Just days before the planned date for the congress, the QDP on 19 February announced the cancellation of the event due to detentions of the party supporters in which Mamai called it "illogical" to hold a congress in the current state affairs and instead urged people to attend a protest that day of which was called earlier by the Democratic Choice of Kazakhstan. On 21 February, just day before the planned protest, Mamai was detained by police and was sentenced to jail for three days. At the protest held in Astana Square, several QDP activists and journalists were detained by police.
