= 2023 Kazakh government formation =

Process of government formation

- Date: 29–30 March 2023
- Location: Kazakhstan
- Type: Government formation
- Cause: 2023 Kazakh legislative election
- Participants: Älihan Smaiylov; Kassym-Jomart Tokayev; Erlan Qoşanov
- Outcome: Älihan Smaiylov is reappointed as Prime Minister; Formation of the Second Smaiylov Government

Following the 2023 Kazakh legislative election, a process of government formation took place in Kazakhstan as incumbent prime minister Älihan Smaiylov alongside his cabinet resigned from the position on 29 March 2023 to serve briefly as acting minister before a new government was appointed.

On 30 March 2023, the ruling Amanat party endorsed Smaiylov's candidacy for PM with majority of the lower chamber Mäjilis MPs voting for his nomination. Upon the parliamentary vote, President Kassym-Jomart Tokayev officially reappointed Smaiylov as the PM, leading for the formation of the Second Smaiylov Government.

== Background ==
Under the 2017 amendment adopted during Nursultan Nazarbayev's presidency, Article 67(4) of the Constitution of Kazakhstan obliges the Prime Minister and his cabinet to resign before the newly elected Mäjilis convenes.

During the 2023 Kazakh legislative election, incumbent prime minister Älihan Smaiylov, who has headed the 12th government of Kazakhstan since January 2022, announced on 19 March 2023 that the entire cabinet would resign after the vote stating, "We are going to resign and will stay in office until the new cabinet is formed. It’s up to the president and the new parliament who is going to be the new prime minister. Of course, my colleagues and I are ready for any scenario."

== Formation ==
=== Potential heads of government ===
Following the announcement of Smaiylov's resignation, political analysts and experts voiced potential candidates for PM that could potentially succeed Smaiylov, citing the unpopularity of Smaiylov and growing economic crisis in Kazakhstan as several prominent officials and public figures were named which included:

- Erbolat Dosaev, äkim of Almaty;
- Nurlan Nogaev, äkim of Mangystau Region;
- Kanat Bozumbayev, former energy minister and äkim of Almaty Region;
- Timur Suleimenov, First Deputy Head of the Presidential Administration;
- Serik Jumanğarin, Deputy Prime Minister for Trade and Integration;
- Roman Sklyar, First Deputy Prime Minister;
- Aset Irgaliyev, Chairman of the Agency for Strategic Planning and Reforms;
- Erlan Qoşanov, chairman of Amanat;
- Akejan Kajegeldin, former PM;
- Mukhtar Dzhakishev, former president of Kazatomprom.

=== PM candidate nomination ===
On 29 March 2023, Smaiylov resigned as PM, leading for him to head a caretaker government as an acting PM. That same day, Erlan Qoşanov, chairman of Mäjilis, hinted that the party faction of Amanat would nominate its candidate for PM in the "coming days".

During Aqorda meeting with President Kassym-Jomart Tokayev on 30 March 2023, Qoşanov endorsed Smaiylov's nomination for PM. At the plenary session of the Mäjilis, Tokayev addressed the deputies by proposing the candidacy of Smaiylov for PM stating, "[Smaiylov] is well aware of the challenges facing the government. I believe that it is possible to entrust it with the new government."

=== Parliamentary vote ===
After President Tokayev's proposal in nominating Smaiylov for PM, a parliamentary confirmation took place in the Mäjilis, to which an overwhelming majority of 82 MPs that included Auyl voted in favour of Smaiylov's candidacy with the opposition Nationwide Social Democratic Party (JSDP) voting against Smaiylov. Following the vote, JSDP chairman Ashat Raqymjanov explained the party's decision in opposing Smaiylov, stressing that "The results of last year are disappointing; we have inflation of more than 20%, unfinished disasters in hesitation, and even a simple car loan raises a lot of questions. It is not up to us to nominate a candidate for the Prime Minister, but I know what it should be," though not fully specifying the exact name. Nurlan Äuesbaev, JSDP MP, argued that a better PM candidate could've been found amongst "20 million people" in Kazakhstan.

Mäjilis confirmation, 30 March 2023
For		Against		Abstained		Did not vote		Absent	
82	83.7%	7	7.1%	8	6.1%	0	0.0%	1	1.0%
Source: Ortalyq.kz

=== Second Smaiylov government ===
President Tokayev signed a decree in officially reappointing Smaiylov as PM. Under his second government, there were 23 appointed ministers which included the composition:

Ministers

- Älihan Smaiylov – prime minister
- Roman Sklyar – first deputy prime minister
- Erulan Jamaubaev – Deputy Prime Minister for Ministry of Finance
- Murat Nurtileu – Deputy Prime Minister for Ministry of Foreign Affairs
- Serik Jumanğarin – Deputy Prime Minister for Ministry of Trade and Integration
- Altai Kölgınov – Deputy Prime Minister
- Ruslan Jaqsylyqov – Minister of Defense
- Marat Ahmetjanov – Minister of Internal Affairs
- Darhan Qydyräli – Minister of Information and Social Development
- Erbol Qaraşükeev – Minister of Agriculture
- Azamat Esqaraev – Minister of Justice
- Saiasat Nurbek – Minister of Science and Higher Education
- Ajar Ğiniat – Minister of Healthcare
- Marat Qarabaev – Minister of Industry and Infrastructure Development
- Ashat Oralov – Minister of Culture and Sports
- Ğani Beisembaev – Minister of Education
- Yuri Ilyin – Minister of Emergency Situations
- Älibek Quantyrov – Minister of National Economy
- Bağdat Musin – Minister of Digital Development, Innovation and Aerospace Industry (Kazakhstan)
- Zülfia Süleimenova – Minister of Ecology and Natural Resources
- Almasadam Satqaliev – Minister of Energy

== See also ==
- Second Smaiylov Government
