= First Smaiylov Government =

14th government of Kazakhstan (2022–2023)

- 17th Cabinet of Kazakhstan
- 2022–2023
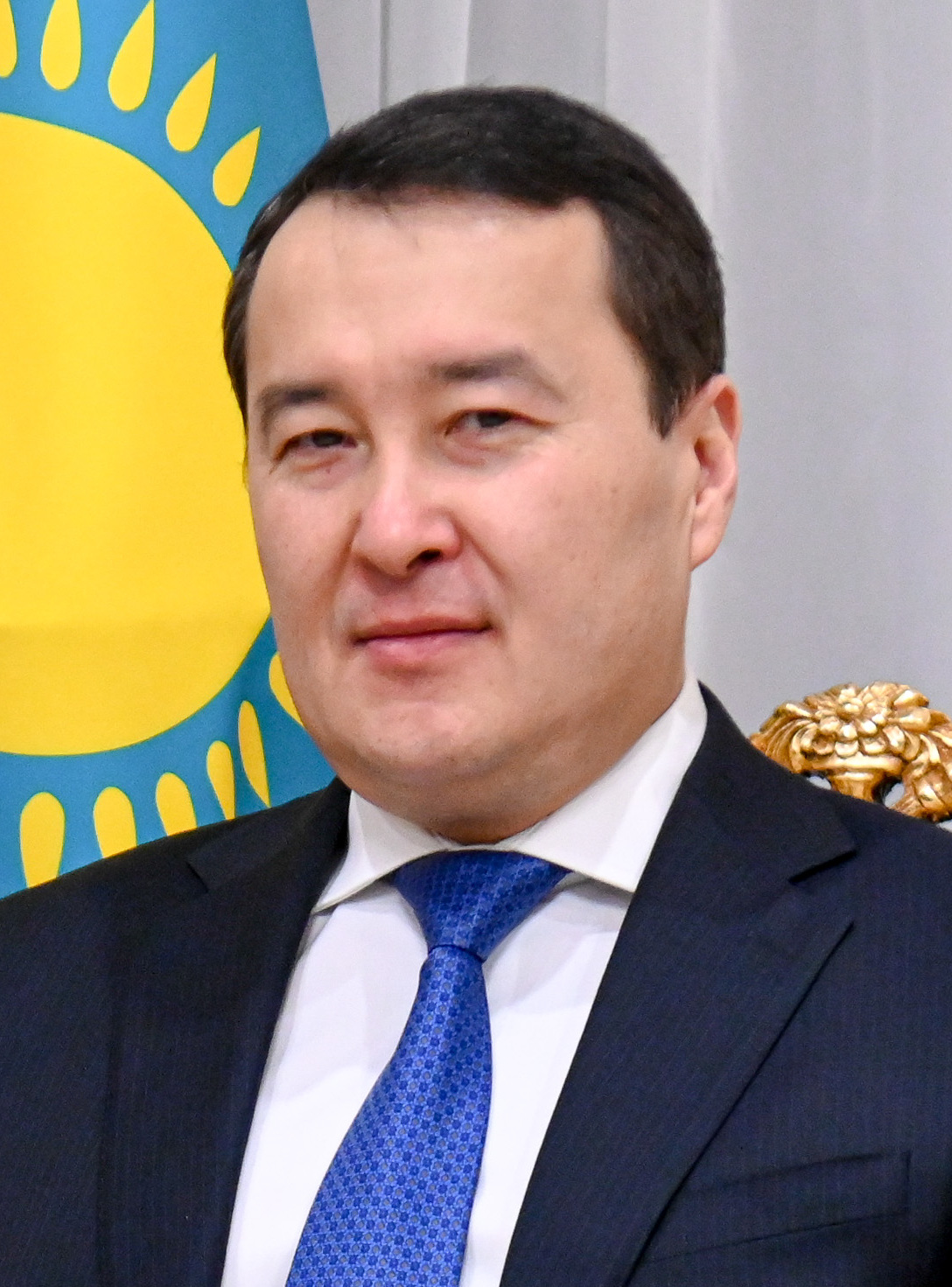
- Date formed: 11 January 2022
- Date dissolved: 30 March 2023

People and organisations
- Head of state: Kassym-Jomart Tokayev
- Head of government: Älihan Smaiylov
- Deputy head of government: Roman Sklyar
- Total no. of members: 21
- Member party: Amanat; Independent
- Status in legislature: Supermajority
- Opposition parties: Aq Jol; QHP

History
- Legislature term: 2021–2023
- Budget: 2023–25
- Predecessor: Mamin II
- Successor: Smaiylov II

The First Smaiylov Government (Kazakh: Смайылов бірінші үкіметі, romanized: Smayılov birinşi ükimeti; Russian: Первое правительство Смаилова) was the 17th composition of the Government of Kazakhstan under the leadership of Prime Minister Älihan Smaiylov. It was formed after the previous government, led by Prime Minister Askar Mamin, was dismissed by President Kassym-Jomart Tokayev on 5 January 2022 as a result of the 2022 Kazakh unrest. The membership of the government was announced by the president on 11 January 2022. Eight of the 21 ministers of the previous cabinet were replaced.

The government functioned before PM Älihan Smaiylov resigned following the 2023 legislative election on 29 March 2023, which was succeeded by the Second Smaiylov Government after Smaiylov was re-appointed to his position as the PM by Tokayev on 30 March.

== Formation ==
On 5 January 2022, while in amidst of the nationwide instability, President Kassym-Jomart Tokayev appointed Älihan Smaiylov to take over Prime Minister Asqar Mamin's role in leading the government temporarily as acting PM until a new composition would be formed. Prior to that, Smayilov served as first deputy prime minister and finance minister in Mamin's government.

During an extraordinary session of the CTSO on 10 January 2022, President Tokayev announced that he would submit proposed candidacies for ministerial posts to the Parliament the following day to form a new cabinet. On 11 January, at the lower house Majilis session, Tokayev named Smaiylov for prime ministerial candidacy where he was unanimously elected by all present 89 deputies across party lines.

== Composition ==
A majority of ministers from the previous composition retained their posts while eight portfolios saw new appointees with two of them formerly serving in the cabinet before returning which were:

- Minister of Healthcare Ajar Ğiniat, previously served as the vice minister
- Minister of Information and Social Development Asqar Omarov, previously served as the vice minister
- Minister of Justice Qanat Musin, previously headed the judicial board for administrative cases and was judge in the Kazakh Supreme Court
- Minister of Industry and Infrastructure Development Qaiyrbek Öskenbaev, previously served as the first vice minister
- Minister of Culture and Sports Dauren Abaev, previously worked in the Presidential Administration under Tokayev
- Minister of National Economy Älibek Quantyrov, previously served as the vice minister
- Minister of Energy Bulat Aqchulaqov, previously worked in the Samruk-Kazyna
- Deputy Prime Minister Bakhyt Sultanov, previously served as the Minister of Trade and Integration

Ministers

Dissolved Ministries

Portfolio	Image	Holder	Term of office	
Portfolio	Image	Holder	Start	End
Head of government
Prime Minister; Премьер-министр		Älihan Smaiylov	11 January 2022	5 February 2024
Deputy Prime Ministers
First Deputy; Премьер-министрдің бірінші орынбасары		Roman Sklyar	11 January 2022	Present
Deputy Prime Minister; Премьер-Министрдің орынбасары		Mukhtar Tleuberdi	11 January 2022	3 April 2023
Deputy Prime Minister; Премьер-Министрдің орынбасары		Bakhyt Sultanov	11 January 2022	2 September 2022
Deputy Prime Minister; Премьер-Министрдің орынбасары		Serik Jumanğarin	2 September 2022	Present
Deputy Prime Minister; Премьер-Министрдің орынбасары		Eraly Togjanov	11 February 2020	31 August 2022
Deputy Prime Minister; Премьер-Министрдің орынбасары		Altai Kölgınov	31 August 2022	11 April 2022
Deputy Prime Minister; Премьер-Министрдің орынбасары		Tamara Düisenova	11 April 2022	Present
Prime Minister's Office
Office Head; Кеңсе Басшысы		Galymjan Koishibaev	11 January 2022	Present
Ministries
Minister of Foreign Affairs; Сыртқы істер министрі		Mukhtar Tleuberdi	11 January 2022	29 March 2023
Minister of Defence; Қорғаныс министрі		Murat Bektanov	11 January 2022	19 January 2022
Minister of Defence; Қорғаныс министрі		Ruslan Jaqsylyqov	19 January 2022	Present
Minister of Internal Affairs; Ішкі істер министрі		Erlan Turgymbaev	11 January 2022	25 February 2022
Minister of Internal Affairs; Ішкі істер министрі		Marat Ahmetjanov	25 February 2022	2 September 2023
Minister of Information and Social Development; Ақпарат және қоғамдық даму министрі		Asqar Omarov	11 January 2022	2 September 2022
Minister of Information and Social Development; Ақпарат және қоғамдық даму министрі		Darkhan Kydyrali	2 September 2022	4 September 2023
Minister of Agriculture; Ауыл шаруашылығы министрі		Erbol Qaraşökeev	11 January 2022	4 September 2023
Minister of Justice; Әділет министрі		Qanat Musin	11 January 2022	30 December 2022
Minister of Justice; Әділет министрі		Azamat Esqaraev	30 December 2022	Present
Minister of Education and Science; Білім және ғылым министрі		Ashat Aimagambetov	11 January 2022	11 June 2022
Minister of Education; Оқу-ағарту министрі		Ashat Aimagambetov	11 June 2022	4 January 2023
Minister of Education; Оқу-ағарту министрі		Ğani Beisembaev	4 January 2023	Present
Minister of Science and Higher Education; Ғылым және жоғары білім министрі		Saiasat Nurbek	11 June 2022	Present
Minister of Healthcare; Денсаулық сақтау министрі		Ajar Ğiniat	11 January 2022	Present
Minister of Labour and Social Protection of the Population; Еңбек және халықты әлеуметтік қорғау министрі		Serik Şapkenov	11 January 2022	11 April 2022
Minister of Labour and Social Protection of the Population; Еңбек және халықты әлеуметтік қорғау министрі		Tamara Düisenova	11 April 2022	4 September 2023
Minister of Industry and Infrastructure Development; Индустрия және инфрақұрылымдық даму министрі		Qaiyrbek Öskenbaev	11 January 2022	4 January 2023
Minister of Industry and Infrastructure Development; Индустрия және инфрақұрылымдық даму министрі		Marat Qarabayev	4 January 2023	4 September 2023
Minister of Finance; Қаржы министрі		Erulan Jamaubaev	11 January 2022	Present
Minister of Culture and Sports; Мәдениет және спорт министрі		Dauren Abaev	11 January 2022	4 January 2023
Minister of Culture and Sports; Мәдениет және спорт министрі		Ashat Oralov	4 January 2023	4 September 2023
Minister of Trade and Integration; Сауда және интеграция министрі		Bakhyt Sultanov	11 January 2022	2 September 2022
Minister of Trade and Integration; Сауда және интеграция министрі		Serik Jumanğarin	2 September 2022	4 September 2023
Minister of Emergency Situations; Төтенше жағдайлар министрі		Yuri Ilyin	11 January 2022	10 June 2023
Minister of National Economy; Ұлттық экономика министрі		Älibek Quantyrov	11 January 2022	Present
Minister of Digital Development, Innovation and Aerospace Industry; Цифрлық даму, инновациялар және аэроғарыш өнеркәсібі министрі		Bağdat Musin	11 January 2022	30 April 2024
Minister of Ecology, Geology and Natural Resources; Экология, геология және табиғи ресурстар министрі		Serıkqali Brekeşev	11 January 2022	14 March 2023
Minister of Ecology, Geology and Natural Resources; Экология, геология және табиғи ресурстар министрі		Zülfia Süleimenova	14 March 2022	4 September 2023
Minister of Energy; Энергетика министрі		Bolat Aqşolaqov	11 January 2022	4 April 2023
