= Second Smaiylov Government =

18th government of Kazakhstan

- 18th Cabinet of Kazakhstan
- 2023–2024
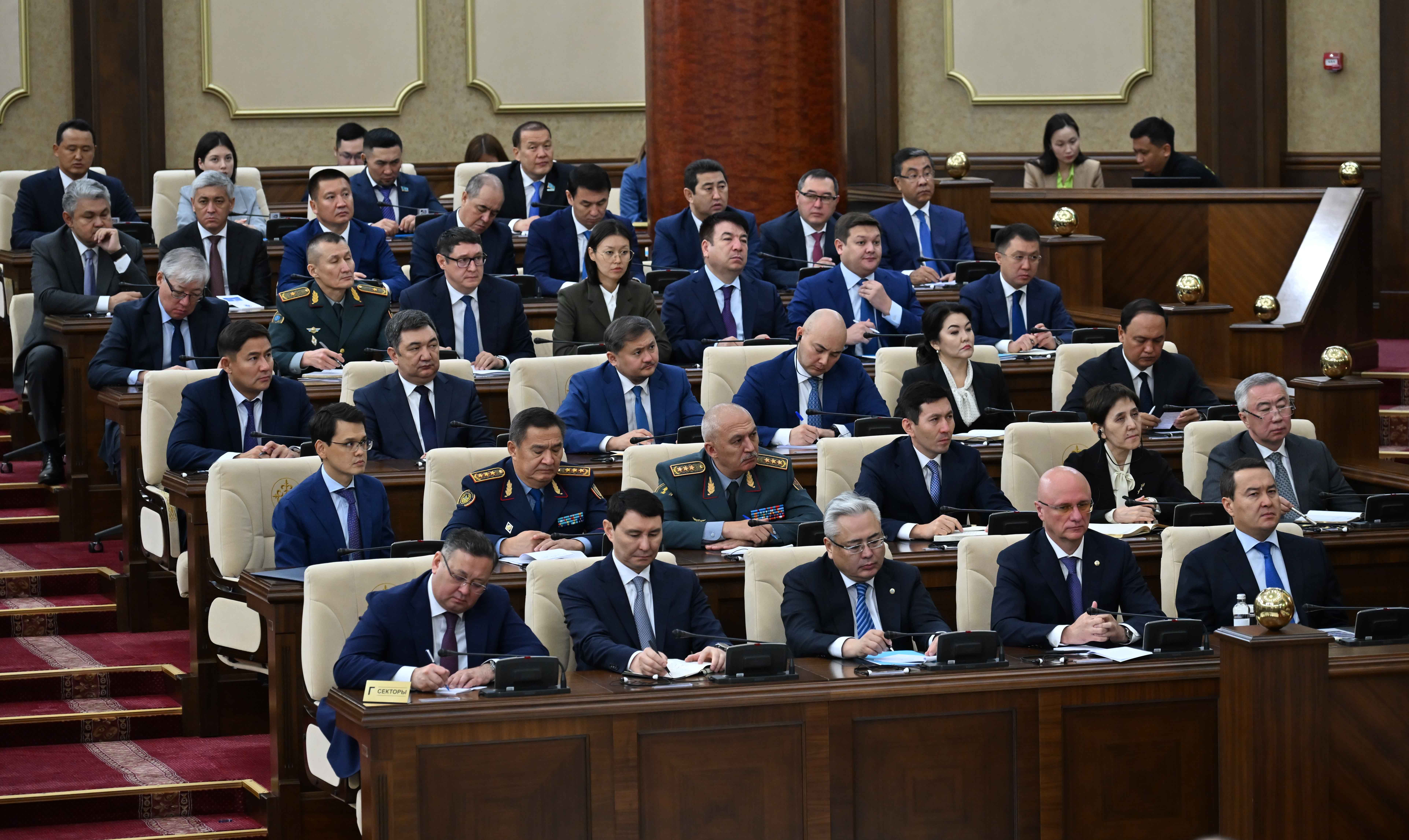
- Members of the Second Smaiylov Government during President Tokayev's State of the Nation Address, 1 September 2023
- Date formed: 30 March 2023
- Date dissolved: 6 February 2024

People and organisations
- Head of state: Kassym-Jomart Tokayev
- Head of government: Älihan Smaiylov; Roman Sklyar (acting)
- Deputy head of government: Roman Sklyar
- Total no. of members: 23
- Member party: Amanat
- Status in legislature: Majority
- Opposition parties: Auyl; Aq Jol; JSDP; QHP; Respublica

History
- Election: 2023
- Legislature term: 2023–
- Budget: 2024–26
- Predecessor: Smaiylov I
- Successor: Bektenov

The Second Smaiylov Government (Kazakh: Смайылов екінші үкіметі, romanized: Smayılov ekinşi ükimeti; Russian: Второе правительство Смаилова) was the 18th composition of the Government of Kazakhstan under the leadership of Prime Minister Alihan Smaiylov. It was formed shortly after the 2023 legislative election, where the First Smaiylov Government previously resigned. On 30 March 2023, Smaiylov was reappointed as PM by President Kassym-Jomart Tokayev after the lower house Mäjilis' confirmation in an 82–7 vote with eight abstentions.

In February 2024, President Tokayev dismissed Smaiylov from the post of Prime Minister, leading to Roman Sklyar briefly assuming the role of acting PM. Subsequently, Oljas Bektenov was appointed by the parliament to officially succeed Smaiylov as the Prime Minister and form the 15th government.

== Formation ==
According to Article 67(4) of the Constitution of Kazakhstan, Prime Minister and his cabinet shall resign in advance of the newly elected Mäjilis, which held its March 2023 legislative election.

Incumbent PM Älihan Smaiylov on 19 March 2023 announced that his current cabinet would resign after the election, leading to a caretaker government to be in place stating, "We are going to resign and will stay in office until the new cabinet is formed. It’s up to the president and the new parliament who is going to be the new prime minister. Of course, my colleagues and I are ready for any scenario." If chosen as PM again, Smaiylov vowed to reduce inflation by 50%. On 29 March, Smaiylov and his government officially resigned at the first plenary session of the 8th Mäjilis, with Smaiylov continuing to serve acting prime minister.

=== Parliamentary vote ===
After President Tokayev's proposal in nominating Smaiylov for PM, a parliamentary confirmation took place in the Mäjilis, to which an overwhelming majority of 82 deputies that included Auyl voted in favour of Smaiylov's candidacy with the opposition Nationwide Social Democratic Party (JSDP) voting against Smaiylov. Following the vote, JSDP chairman Ashat Raqymjanov explained the party's decision in opposing Smaiylov, stressing that "The results of last year are disappointing; we have inflation of more than 20%, unfinished disasters in hesitation, and even a simple car loan raises a lot of questions. It is not up to us to nominate a candidate for the Prime Minister, but I know what it should be," though not fully specifying the exact name. Nurlan Äuesbaev, JSDP deputy, argued that a better PM candidate could've been found amongst "20 million people" in Kazakhstan.

Mäjilis confirmation, 30 March 2023
For		Against		Abstained		Did not vote		Absent	
82	83.7%	7	7.1%	8	6.1%	0	0.0%	1	1.0%
Source: Ortalyq.kz

== Composition ==
In the aftermath of ministerial appointments, the government composition featured two (or 8.6%) new ministers out of 23 cabinet officials.

The members of the cabinet are:

Cabinet members

Dissolved Ministries
Portfolio	Image	Holder	Term of office	
Portfolio	Image	Holder	Start	End
Head of government
Prime Minister; Премьер-Министр		Älihan Smaiylov	11 January 2022	5 February 2024
Prime Minister; Премьер-Министр		Roman Sklyar; Acting	5 February 2024	6 February 2024
Deputy Prime Ministers
First Deputy; Kazakh: Премьер-министрдің бірінші орынбасары Russian: Первый заместитель Премьер-Министра		Roman Sklyar	11 January 2022	Present
Deputy Prime Minister; Kazakh: Премьер-Министрдің орынбасары Russian: Заместитель Премьер-Министра		Mukhtar Tleuberdi	11 January 2022	3 April 2023
Deputy Prime Minister; Kazakh: Премьер-Министрдің орынбасары Russian: Заместитель Премьер-Министра		Murat Nurtleu	3 April 2023	Present
Deputy Prime Minister; Kazakh: Премьер-Министрдің орынбасары Russian: Заместитель Премьер-Министра		Serik Jumanğarin	2 September 2022	Present
Deputy Prime Minister; Kazakh: Премьер-Министрдің орынбасары Russian: Заместитель Премьер-Министра		Tamara Düisenova	11 April 2022	Present
Prime Minister's Office
Chief of Staff of the Government; Kazakh: Үкімет Аппаратының басшысы Russian: Руководитель Аппарата Правительства		Galymjan Koishibaev	11 January 2022	Present
Ministries
Minister of Foreign Affairs; Kazakh: Сыртқы істер министрі Russian: Министр обороны		Mukhtar Tleuberdi	11 January 2022	29 March 2023
Minister of Foreign Affairs; Kazakh: Сыртқы істер министрі Russian: Министр обороны		Murat Nurtleu	3 April 2023	Present
Minister of Defence; Kazakh: Қорғаныс министрі Russian: Министр обороны		Ruslan Jaqsylyqov	19 January 2022	Present
Minister of Internal Affairs; Kazakh: Ішкі істер министрі Russian: Министр внутренних дел		Marat Ahmetjanov	25 February 2022	2 September 2023
Minister of Internal Affairs; Kazakh: Ішкі істер министрі Russian: Министр внутренних дел		Erjan Sädenov	2 September 2023	Present
Minister of Information and Social Development; Kazakh: Ақпарат және қоғамдық даму министрі Russian: Министр информации и общественного развития		Darkhan Kydyrali	2 September 2022	4 September 2023
Minister of Culture and Information; Kazakh: Мәдениет және ақпарат министрі Russian: Министр культуры и информации		Aida Balaeva	4 September 2023	Present
Minister of Agriculture; Kazakh: Ауыл шаруашылығы министрі Russian: Министр сельского хозяйства		Erbol Qaraşökeev	11 January 2022	4 September 2023
Minister of Agriculture; Kazakh: Ауыл шаруашылығы министрі Russian: Министр сельского хозяйства		Aidarbek Saparov	4 September 2023	Present
Minister of Justice; Kazakh: Әділет министрі Russian: Министр юстиции		Azamat Esqaraev	30 December 2022	Present
Minister of Education; Kazakh: Оқу-ағарту министрі Russian: Министр просвещения		Ğani Beisembaev	4 January 2023	Present
Minister of Science and Higher Education; Kazakh: Ғылым және жоғары білім министрі Russian: Министр науки и высшего образования		Saiasat Nurbek	11 June 2022	Present
Minister of Healthcare; Kazakh: Денсаулық сақтау министрі Russian: Министр здравоохранения		Ajar Ğiniat	11 January 2022	6 January 2024
Minister of Labour and Social Protection of the Population; Kazakh: Еңбек және халықты әлеуметтік қорғау министрі Russian: Министр труда и социальной защиты населения		Tamara Düisenova	11 April 2022	4 September 2023
Minister of Labour and Social Protection of the Population; Kazakh: Еңбек және халықты әлеуметтік қорғау министрі Russian: Министр труда и социальной защиты населения		Svetlana Jaqypova	4 September 2023	Present
Minister of Industry and Infrastructure Development; Kazakh: Индустрия және инфрақұрылымдық даму министрі Russian: Министр индустрии и инфраструктурного развития		Marat Qarabaev	4 January 2023	4 September 2023
Minister of Transport; Kazakh: Көлік министрі Kazakh: Министр транспорта		Marat Qarabaev	4 September 2023	Present
Minister of Industry and Construction; Kazakh: Өнеркәсіп және құрылыс министрі Russian: Министр промышленности и инфраструктурного развития		Qanat Şarlapaev	4 September 2023	Present
Minister of Finance; Kazakh: Қаржы министрі Russian: Министр финансов		Erulan Jamaubaev	11 January 2022	6 January 2024
Minister of Culture and Sports; Kazakh: Мәдениет және спорт министрі Russian: Министр культуры и спорта		Ashat Oralov	4 January 2023	4 September 2023
Minister of Tourism and Sports; Kazakh: Туризм және спорт министрі Russian: Министр туризма и спорта		Ermek Marjyqpaev	4 September 2023	Present
Minister of Trade and Integration; Kazakh: Сауда және интеграция министрі Russian: Министр торговли и интеграции		Serik Jumanğarin	2 September 2022	4 September 2023
Minister of Trade and Integration; Kazakh: Сауда және интеграция министрі Russian: Министр торговли и интеграции		Arman Şaqqaliev	4 September 2023	Present
Minister of Emergency Situations; Kazakh: Төтенше жағдайлар министрі Russian: Министр по чрезвычайным ситуациям		Yuri Ilyin	11 January 2022	10 June 2023
Minister of Emergency Situations; Kazakh: Төтенше жағдайлар министрі Russian: Министр по чрезвычайным ситуациям		Syrym Şäriphanov	10 June 2023	6 January 2024
Minister of National Economy; Kazakh: Ұлттық экономика министрі Russian: Министр национальной экономики		Alibek Quantyrov	11 January 2022	6 January 2024
Minister of Digital Development, Innovation and Aerospace Industry; Kazakh: Цифрлық даму, инновациялар және аэроғарыш өнеркәсібі министрі Russian: Министр цифрового развития, инноваций и аэрокосмической промышленности		Bağdat Musin	11 January 2022	Present
Minister of Ecology, Geology and Natural Resources; Kazakh: Экология, геология және табиғи ресурстар министрі Russian: Министр экологии и природных ресурсов		Zülfia Süleimenova	14 March 2022	4 September 2023
Ministry of Water Resources and Irrigation; Kazakh: Су ресурстары және ирригация министрі Russian: Министр водных ресурсов и ирригации		Nurjan Nurjıgıtov	4 September 2023	Present
Ministry of Ecology and Natural Resources; Kazakh: Экология және табиғи ресурстар министрі Russian: Министр экологии и природных ресурсов		Erlan Nysanbaev	4 September 2023	Present
Minister of Energy; Kazakh: Энергетика министрі Russian: Министр энергетики		Bolat Aqşolaqov	11 January 2022	4 April 2023
Minister of Energy; Kazakh: Энергетика министрі Russian: Министр энергетики		Almasadam Sätqaliev	4 April 2023	Present
