= Second Mamin Government =

2021–2022 government of Kazakhstan

- 16th Cabinet of Kazakhstan
- 2021–2022
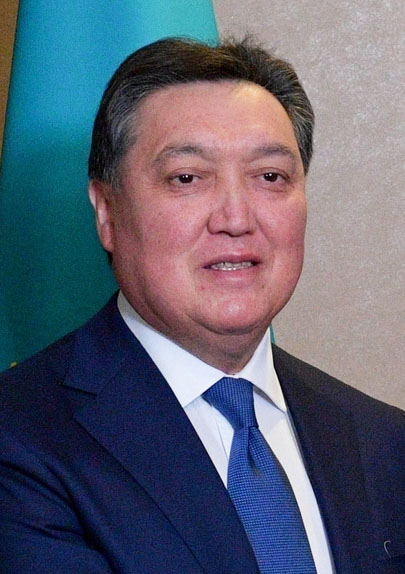
- Date formed: 15 January 2021
- Date dissolved: 11 January 2022

People and organisations
- Head of state: Kassym-Jomart Tokayev
- Head of government: Asqar Mamin; Alihan Smaiylov (acting)
- Deputy head of government: Alihan Smaiylov
- Total no. of members: 20
- Member party: Nur Otan
- Status in legislature: Supermajority
- Opposition parties: Aq Jol; QHP
- Opposition leader: Azat Peruaşev

History
- Election: 2021
- Legislature term: 2021–2023
- Predecessor: Mamin I
- Successor: Smaiylov I

The Second Mamin Government (Kazakh: Мамин екінші үкіметі, romanized: Mamïn ekinşi ükimeti; Russian: Второе правительство Мамина) was the 16th composition of the Government of Kazakhstan under the leadership of Prime Minister Askar Mamin. It was formed on 15 January 2021 following the 2021 legislative election, where Mamin, who has headed the government since February 2019, was re-appointed as PM by President Kassym-Jomart Tokayev. This also marked the first time that a government cabinet was formed in Kazakhstan as a result of the election due to a 2017 constitutional reform law, with his prime-ministerial nomination being supported by 78 deputies of the lower house Mäjilis.

The cabinet resigned in awake of the massive nationwide unrest on 5 January 2022, which was then briefly led by Mamin's deputy, Älihan Smaiylov, as the acting prime minister of the caretaker government before a new succeeding cabinet was sworn on 11 January.

== Composition ==
Functions	Holder	Start	End
Prime Minister Премьер-министр	Askar Mamin	25 February 2019	5 January 2022
Prime Minister Премьер-министр	Alihan Smaiylov (Acting)	5 January 2022	11 January 2022
First Deputy Prime Minister Премьер-министрдің бірінші орынбасары	Alihan Smaiylov	25 February 2019	11 January 2022
Deputy Prime Minister Премьер-Министрдің орынбасары	Roman Sklyar	18 September 2019	11 January 2022
Deputy Prime Minister Премьер-Министрдің орынбасары	Eraly Togjanov	11 February 2020	11 January 2022
Prime Minister's Office Премьер-Министр Кеңсесінің Басшысы	Galymjan Koishibaev	26 March 2019	11 January 2022
Ministry of Foreign Affairs Сыртқы істер министрі	Mukhtar Tleuberdi	8 September 2019	11 January 2022
Ministry of Defence Қорғаныс министрі	Nurlan Yermekbayev	7 August 2018	31 August 2021
Ministry of Defence Қорғаныс министрі	Murat Bektanov	31 August 2021	11 January 2022
Ministry of Internal Affairs Ішкі істер министрі	Erlan Turgymbaev	12 February 2019	11 January 2022
Ministry of Information and Social Development Ақпарат және қоғамдық даму министрі	Aida Balaeva	4 May 2020	11 January 2022
Ministry of Agriculture Ауыл шаруашылығы министрі	Saparhan Omarov	25 February 2019	10 July 2021
Ministry of Agriculture Ауыл шаруашылығы министрі	Erbol Qaraşökeev	10 July 2021	11 January 2022
Ministry of Justice Әділет министрі	Marat Beketaev	13 September 2016	11 January 2022
Ministry of Education and Science Білім және ғылым министрі	Ashat Aimagambetov	13 June 2019	11 January 2022
Ministry of Healthcare Денсаулық сақтау министрі	Alexey Tsoi	25 June 2020	11 January 2022
Ministry of Labour and Social Protection of the Population Еңбек және халықты әлеуметтік қорғау министрі	Birjan Nurymbetov	20 August 2019	18 January 2021
Ministry of Labour and Social Protection of the Population Еңбек және халықты әлеуметтік қорғау министрі	Serik Şapkenov	18 January 2021	11 January 2022
Ministry of Industry and Infrastructure Development Индустрия және инфрақұрылымдық даму министрі	Beibut Atamkulov	18 September 2019	11 January 2022
Ministry of Finance Қаржы министрі	Erulan Jamaubaev	18 May 2020	11 January 2022
Ministry of Culture and Sports Мәдениет және спорт министрі	Aqtoty Raiymqulova	17 June 2019	11 January 2022
Ministry of Trade and Integration Сауда және интеграция министрі	Bakhyt Sultanov	17 June 2019	11 January 2022
Ministry of Emergency Situations Төтенше жағдайлар министрі	Yuri Ilyin	11 September 2020	11 January 2022
Ministry of National Economy Ұлттық экономика министрі	Ruslan Dälenov	25 February 2019	18 January 2021
Ministry of National Economy Ұлттық экономика министрі	Aset Ergaliev	18 January 2021	11 January 2022
Ministry of Digital Development, Innovation and Aerospace Industry Цифрлық даму, инновациялар және аэроғарыш өнеркәсібі министрі	Bağdat Musin	2 September 2020	11 January 2022
Ministry of Ecology, Geology and Natural Resources Экология, геология және табиғи ресурстар министрі	Magzum Myrzagaliev	17 June 2019	9 September 2021
Ministry of Ecology, Geology and Natural Resources Экология, геология және табиғи ресурстар министрі	Serıkqali Brekeşev	10 September 2021	11 January 2022
Ministry of Energy Энергетика министрі	Nurlan Nogaev	18 December 2019	9 September 2021
Ministry of Energy Энергетика министрі	Magzum Myrzagaliev	9 September 2021	11 January 2022

Preceded by Sagintayev Cabinet	Mamin Cabinet; 2019 — 2022	Succeeded by Smaiylov Cabinet
