= Asqar Omarov =

Kazakh politician (born 1976)

- Асқар Омаров
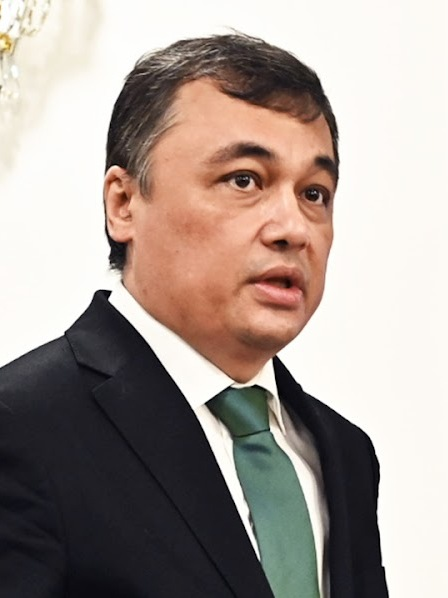
- Omarov in 2022

Director of the Central Communications Service under the President of the Republic of Kazakhstan
- In office 2 September 2022 – 20 October 2026
- President: Kassym-Jomart Tokayev
- Preceded by: Erjan Babaqumarov

Minister of Information and Social Development
- In office 11 January 2022 – 2 September 2022
- President: Kassym-Jomart Tokayev
- Prime Minister: Älihan Smaiylov
- Preceded by: Aida Balaeva
- Succeeded by: Darhan Qydyrali

Personal details
- Born: 30 June 1976 (age 50) Almaty, Kazakh SSR, Soviet Union (now Almaty, Kazakhstan)
- Spouse: Indira Omarova
- Children: 2
- Education: Turan University
- Awards: Medal for Distinguished Labor

Asqar Quanyşuly Omarov (Kazakh: Асқар Қуанышұлы Омаров; born 30 June 1976) is a Kazakh politician who served as a minister of information and social development from 11 January 2022 to 2 September 2022. He is currently the director of the Central Communications Service under the president since 2 September 2022.

== Biography ==
=== Early life and career ===
Omarov was born in Almaty and graduated from Turan University. He trained in Poland and Israel.

Omarov began his career in 1997 as an economist at the Republican Center for Cultural Problems. From 1998 to 1999, he worked as a marketing specialist in the magazine Small Business of Kazakhstan, owned by the BIKO publishing house.

In 2001, Omarov began to cooperate with the publication News of the Week, where he was a correspondent, columnist and head of the political department. Three years later, he moved to the Qazaqstan RTRK Corporation, where he held the positions of editor-in-chief and deputy director. He was the editor-in-chief of the Almaty branch of the RTRK "Qazaqstan".

Omarov also held a number of positions in the corporate and communications sectors. In 2007, he briefly served as chief manager at KazMunayGas, before becoming creative director at Infinity Communication and later first deputy general director of the Nur-Media holding. From 2011 to 2013, he served as Vice President of the Turkic Academy, followed in 2014 by a position as managing director of the Astana EXPO-2017 National Company.

In September 2014, he became president of the KazBusinessMedia Public Foundation, holding this position until April 2017. From 8 April 2017 to 2020, he was the general director, and from 2020 to 2021, he was the chairman of the board of Kazinform.

=== Political career ===
From 18 January 2021 to 31 January 2022, Omarov has been a member of the National Council of Public Trust under the President of Kazakhstan.

On 19 August 2021, he was appointed Vice Minister of Information and Social Development of Kazakhstan.

On 11 January 2022, Omarov was appointed Minister of Information and Social Development of Kazakhstan in the government of Älihan Smaiylov. On 2 September 2022, he was dismissed from office and appointed director of the Central Communications Service under the President of the Republic of Kazakhstan.

== Awards and titles ==
- Medal "For Distinguished Labor" (2019)
