= Zhaksybek Kulekeyev =

Independent Director of Halyk Bank
- Incumbent
- Assumed office December 4, 2023
- President: Kassym-Jomart Tokayev
- Prime Minister: Älihan Smaiylov; Oljas Bektenov

Chairman of the Board of Directors of the Eurasian National University
- Incumbent
- Assumed office October 2022
- President: Kassym-Jomart Tokayev
- Prime Minister: Älihan Smaiylov; Oljas Bektenov

Managing Director for Corporate Development, Kazakh Oil and Gas Institute
- Incumbent
- Assumed office January 18, 2010
- President: Nursultan Nazarbayev
- Prime Minister: See list: Karim Massimov; Serik Akhmetov; Karim Massimov; Bakhytzhan Sagintayev; Asqar Mamin; Älihan Smaiylov; Oljas Bektenov
- Preceded by: Serik Minavarovic Burkitbaev

President of Kazakhstan Temir Joly
- In office May 28, 2007 – March 2008
- President: Nursultan Nazarbayev
- Prime Minister: Karim Massimov
- Preceded by: Erlan Dumshebaevich Atamkulov
- Succeeded by: Asqar Mamin

Rector of the Academy of Public Administration under the President
- In office June 2005 – January 2006
- President: Nursultan Nazarbayev
- Prime Minister: Daniyal Akhmetov

8th Minister of Education and Science
- In office June 14, 2003 – December 14, 2004
- President: Nursultan Nazarbayev
- Prime Minister: Imangali Tasmagambetov
- Preceded by: Shamsha Berkimbayeva
- Succeeded by: Byrganym Aitimova

Chairman of the Supreme Court of Audit
- In office January 30, 2002 – June 14, 2003
- President: Nursultan Nazarbayev
- Prime Minister: Imangali Tasmagambetov
- Preceded by: Musiraly Smailovich Utebaev
- Succeeded by: Omarkhan Nurtayevich Oksikbaev

Minister of Economy
- In office October 13, 1999 – January 30, 2002
- President: Nursultan Nazarbayev
- Prime Minister: Kassym-Jomart Tokayev; Imangali Tasmagambetov
- Preceded by: Umirzak Shukeyev
- Succeeded by: Mazhit Tuleubekovich Yesenbaev

Chairman of the Agency for Statistics
- In office January 25, 1997 – October 13, 1999
- President: Nursultan Nazarbayev
- Prime Minister: Nurlan Balgimbayev; Akejan Kajegeldin; Kassym-Jomart Tokayev
- Preceded by: Vladimir Ivanovich Goryachkovsky
- Succeeded by: Älihan Smaiylov

Personal details
- Born: July 24, 1957 (age 68) Talas District, Jambyl Region, Kazakh SSR
- Spouse: Gulnara Khasanovna Ismurzina
- Children: daughter Dinara (1980) son Dair (1986)
- Education: Kazakh National University
- Occupation: Mathematician

Zhaksybek Kulekeyev (also transcribed: Zhaksybek Kulekeev and Jaksybek Koulekeiev; in Kazakh: Жақсыбек Құлекеев, romanized: Jaqsybek Qūlekeev) is the first deputy CEO of KazMunayGas. He was born on 24 July 1957 in Bostandyk, Zhambyl Province. In 1979 he graduated from the mathematical faculty of Kazakh state university. In 1979-1992 he worked in the Almaty Institute of National Economy and in 1992–1995 in the Kazakh State Economic University.

In 1995-1997 Zhaksybek Kulekeyev served as the first vice-president of Kazakhstan State Committee of Statistics and Analysis and in 1997–1999 as the Chairman of Kazakhstan Agency of Statistics.

In 1999-2000 Zhaksybek Kulekeyev was Minister of Economics, in 2000–2002 Minister of Economics and Trade, in 2002-2003 Chairman of Accounting Committee, and in 2003-2004 Minister of Education and Sciences.

In 2005-2006 Zhaksybek Kulekeyev was Rector of State Management Academy. Since January 2006 he works at KazMunayGas. Zhaksybek Kulekeyev is married and has one daughter and one son.
