= Qanat Musin =

Kazakh politician and jurist (born 1966)

- Қанат Мусин
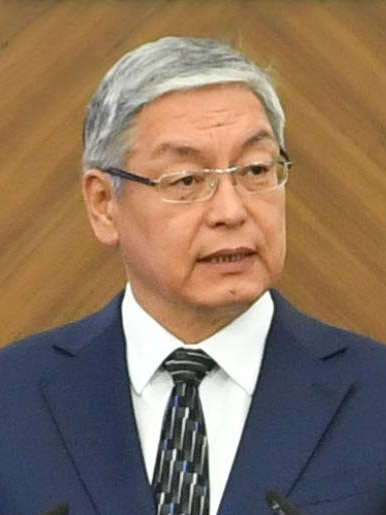
- Musin in 2022

Judge of the Constitutional Court of Kazakhstan
- Incumbent
- Assumed office 1 January 2023
- Nominated by: Kassym-Jomart Tokayev

Minister of Justice
- In office 11 January 2022 – 30 December 2022
- President: Kassym-Jomart Tokayev
- Prime Minister: Älihan Smaiylov
- Preceded by: Marat Beketaev
- Succeeded by: Azamat Esqaraev

Judge of the Supreme Court of Kazakhstan
- In office 10 June 2021 – 11 January 2022
- Nominated by: Kassym-Jomart Tokayev

Member of the Mäjilis
- In office 24 March 2016 – 14 June 2021

Personal details
- Born: 27 February 1966 (age 60) Tselinograd, Kazakh SSR, Soviet Union (now Astana, Kazakhstan)
- Party: Independent (since 2022)
- Other political affiliations: Amanat (until 2022)
- Education: E. A. Buketov Karaganda State University
- Profession: Judge; lawyer
- Awards: Medal for Distinguished Labor; Medal "20 Years of the Republic of Kazakhstan"; Medal "10 years of Astana"

Qanat Sergeiūly Musin (Kazakh: Қанат Сергейұлы Мусин; born 27 February 1966) is a Kazakh politician and jurist who is serving as a judge of the Constitutional Court of Kazakhstan since 2023. He previously served as Minister of Justice of the Republic of Kazakhstan from 11 January to 30 December 2022.

== Biography ==
Born in Tselinograd (now Astana), Musin graduated from the E. A. Buketov Karaganda State University with a law degree and holds the rank of Senior Counselor of Justice. He is also a Colonel of the Financial Police.

Musin began his professional career between 1984 and 1986 as a bailiff, court session secretary, and archivist at the People's Court of the Leninsky District of Tselinograd. From 1986 to 1989 he worked as a senior legal adviser at Tselinogradoblgaztop. In 1989 he joined the prosecutorial system, serving in various positions within the prosecutor's offices of Tselinograd and the Akmola Region, eventually becoming deputy prosecutor of Astana. Between 1998 and 2001, he served as Deputy Prosecutor of the North Kazakhstan Region and later as First Deputy Prosecutor of the Jambyl Region.

From 2001 to 2007, Musin worked in the financial police, where he was deputy head of the Department for Combating Economic and Corruption Crimes in the West Kazakhstan Region and later in Almaty. After moving to the Security Council of the Republic of Kazakhstan in 2007, he worked as a chief expert, chief inspector, and subsequently as deputy head of the Council's Secretariat until 2010. He then returned to prosecutorial service as First Deputy Prosecutor of the North Kazakhstan Region from 2010 to 2012 before being appointed Head of the Department of Justice of Astana, a post he held until 2016.

In 2016, Musin ran for election in a Nur Otan party list and subsequently parliamentary work in March 2016 as a deputy of the Mäjilis of the sixth convocation. In January 2021, he continued as a deputy of the seventh convocation and was appointed chairman of the Committee on Legislation and Judicial and Legal Reform.

On 13 October 2020, Musin became chairman of the Legal Council of the Nur Otan party, a position he held until 7 September 2021. During this period, on 31 March 2021, he was also appointed chairman of the Human Rights Commission under the President of the Republic of Kazakhstan, serving in that capacity until 27 August 2021.

On 10 June 2021, Musin became a judge of the Supreme Court of Kazakhstan. On 14 June 2021, he was appointed as the chairman of the Judicial Panel for Administrative Cases of the Supreme Court of the Republic of Kazakhstan.

From 11 January to 30 December 2022, Musin served as Minister of Justice in the government of Älihan Smaiylov.

On 30 December 2022, he was appointed as judge of the newly re-established Constitutional Court of Kazakhstan by President Kassym-Jomart Tokayev, which his appointment was confirmed by deputies upon the beginning of the court's work on 1 January 2023.

== Awards ==
- Medal for Distinguished Labor
- Medal "20 Years of the Republic of Kazakhstan"
- Medal "10 years of Astana"
- Commemorative sign "IPA CIS. 25 years" (27 March 2017)
