= Eljan Birtanov =

Kazakh politician (born 1971)

Yelzhan Birtanov
- Елжан Біртанов
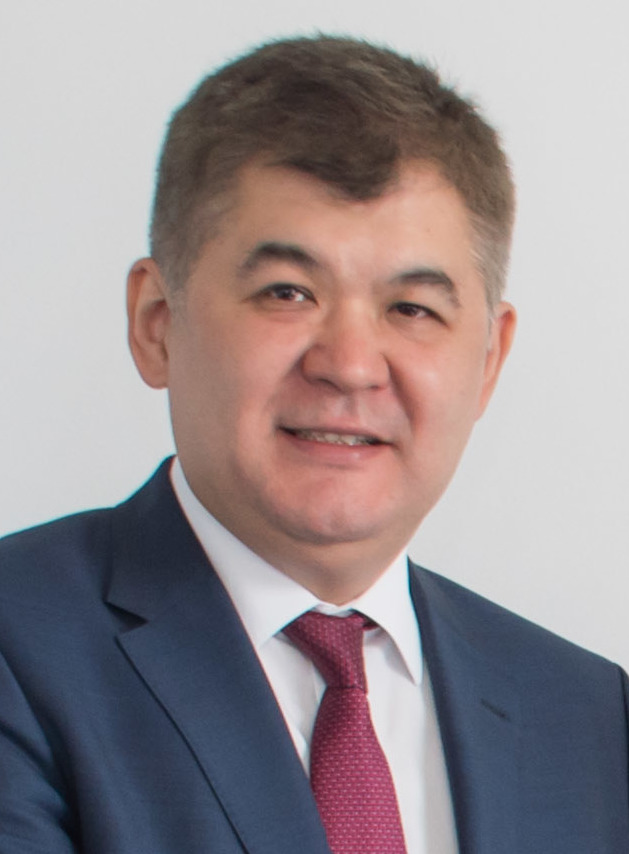
- Birtanov in 2018

Minister of Healthcare
- In office 25 January 2017 – 25 June 2020
- President: Nursultan Nazarbayev; Kassym-Jomart Tokayev
- Prime Minister: Bakhytzhan Sagintayev; Askar Mamin
- Preceded by: Tamara Duisenova (Healthcare and Social Development)
- Succeeded by: Alexey Tsoi

Personal details
- Born: 18 October 1971 (age 54) Dzhambul, Kazakh SSR, Soviet Union
- Children: 5
- Education: Kazakh National Medical University; University of Arizona; Russian Medical Academy of Postgraduate Education; Charité; Turan University; Fuqua School of Business

Yelzhan Amantaiuly Birtanov (Kazakh: Елжан Амантайұлы Біртанов, Eljan Amantaiūly Bırtanov; born 18 October 1971) is a Kazakh politician who served as the Minister of Healthcare from 2017 to 2020.

== Early life and education ==
Birtanov was born in the city of Dzhambul (present-day Taraz) in the Kazakh SSR to a family of doctors. In 1994, he graduated from the Kazakh National Medical University in Almaty. Upon graduating, Birtanov left for the United States to study intensive care and toxicology at the University of Arizona in Tucson. In 1998, he received a Ph.D in Medical Sciences. In 2001, Birtanov graduated from the Russian Medical Academy of Postgraduate Education under the program "Management in Healthcare" in Moscow. He also mastered the management of hospital affairs at the Charité in Berlin in 2006. Birtanov earned a doctorate in medical sciences in 2010 and graduated from the Fuqua School of Business of Duke University in Durham, North Carolina, receiving master's degree in business administration in 2013.

== Career ==
Birtanov's early career began while he studying as a nurse in the Department of Psychoneurology of the Central Clinical Hospital. He also worked in the intensive care and the Department of Toxicology BSMP in Almaty. Then he worked as a toxicologist, resuscitator, and led the BSMP Information and Advisory Toxicology Center from 1994 to 1998. In 1998, Birtanov became the head of the Almaty City Toxicology Center until 1999, when he became the head of the Republican Center of Toxicology until 2005. From 2000 to 2008, where he taught a course of clinical toxicology. He was also the director of the RSE "Institute for Health Development of the Ministry of Health". In 2005, he was appointed director of the RSE "Healthcare Development Institute" under the Ministry of Healthcare.

From March to August 2008, Birtanov was an adviser to the Prime Minister Karim Massimov. From 2008 to 2010, he was the Vice Minister of Healthcare. In April 2010, Birtanov became as the Chairman of the Board of JSC "National Medical Holding".

In December 2012, Birtanov was appointed as an advisor to the Chairman of the Executive Council of Nazarbayev University.

In November 2015, he became the Vice Minister of Healthcare and Social Development.

On 25 January 2017, Birtanov was appointed as the Minister of Healthcare.

On 14 June 2020, it was reported that Birtanov was tested positive for COVID-19. He resigned from the position as the minister on 25 June, stating that the complications from the virus had prevented him from leading an effort to combat the pandemic. On 3 July 2020, it was announced that Birtanov had recovered from the coronavirus.

On November 3, 2020, the Financial Monitoring Committee of the Ministry of Finance announced the institution of a criminal case against the former Minister of Health Birtanov E.A. on the fact of embezzlement of budget funds on a particularly large scale.

On October 28, 2022, the Court found Yelzhan Birtanov innocent of committing a criminal offense under Part 3 of Article 361 of the Criminal Code of the Republic of Kazakhstan on the episode "use of a sanitary aircraft" and acquitted him for the absence of corpus delicti in his actions. On the second episode, he was found guilty of committing a criminal offense under paragraph 3 of part 4 of Article 361 of the Criminal Code of the Republic of Kazakhstan, and imposed a penalty under this article in the form of restriction of liberty for a period of five years.

On February 10, 2023, the court of the Saryarkinsky district of Astana considered an appeal against the verdict against Yelzhan Birtanov and left it unchanged.

On March 14, 2023, he was appointed advisor to the chairman of the Republican Branch Trade Union of Medical Workers QazMed.
