= Qaiyrbek Öskenbaev =

Kazakh politician

- Қайырбек Өскенбаев
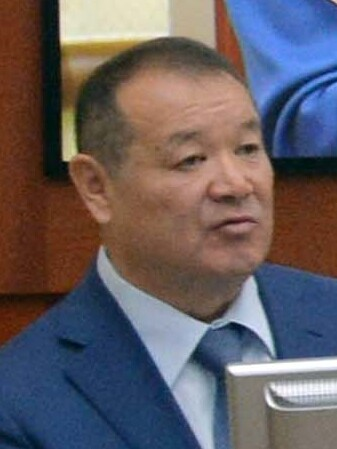
- Öskenbaev in 2022

Minister of Industry and Infrastructure Development
- In office 11 January 2022 – 4 January 2023
- President: Kassym-Jomart Tokayev
- Prime Minister: Älihan Smaiylov
- Preceded by: Beibut Atamkulov
- Succeeded by: Marat Qarabaev

Member of the Astana City Mäslihat
- In office 2003–2004

Personal details
- Born: 24 October 1964 (age 61) Tselinograd, Kazakh SSR, Soviet Union (now Astana, Kazakhstan)
- Spouse: Säule Öskenbaeva
- Children: 2
- Education: Karaganda Academy of the Ministry of Internal Affairs of the Republic of Kazakhstan; S. Seifullin Kazakh Agrotechnical Research University; L. N. Gumilev Eurasian National University
- Awards: Medal "Astana"; Medal "10 Years of Independence of the Republic of Kazakhstan"; Order of Kurmet; Medal "20 Years of Independence of the Republic of Kazakhstan"; Order of Parasat

Qaiyrbek Aitbaiuly Öskenbaev (Kazakh: Қайырбек Айтбайұлы Өскенбаев, romanized: Qaiyrbek Aitbaiūly Öskenbaev; 24 October 1964) is a Kazakh politician who served as Minister of Industry and Infrastructure Development from 2022 to 2023.

== Biography ==
Born in Tselinograd (now Astana), Öskenbaev completed his education at several institutions: the Karaganda Higher School of the Ministry of Internal Affairs in 1986, the Akmola Agricultural University in 1996, and the Diplomatic Academy of the Eurasian National University in 2004. He holds degrees in law, economics, and international relations.

His career began in 1982 as an investigator at the Leninsky District Police Department in Tselinograd. Over the years, Öskenbaev held various roles in government, including head of the Legal Department at the Akmola Territorial Committee on State Property and director of the Privatization Bureau in the region. He also served as chairman of the State Property Committee of Akmolinsk and director of the Municipal Property Fund of Astana.

From 2003 to 2004, Öskenbaev was a deputy of the Astana City Mäslihat. He later worked in the Ministry of Industry and Trade, including leading the Committee for Regulation of Trade and Tourism and the Tourism Industry Committee. On 26 September 2007, he became Vice Minister of Tourism and Sports. He then held positions in the Ministry of Regional Development and the Ministry of National Economy, where he served as First Deputy Minister of Regional Development and Deputy Minister of National Economy from 13 August 2014 to 6 May 2016.

From 2016 to 2018, Öskenbaev worked as managing director of the National Management Holding "Baiterek". Afterward, he became Vice Minister for Investments and Development on 24 January 2018, and later First Vice Minister for Investments and Development from 20 March 2019 to 2022.

On 11 January 2022, he was appointed Minister of Industry and Infrastructure Development of Kazakhstan by President Kassym-Jomart Tokayev. He held this position until being dismissed on 4 January 2023.

Öskenbaev has also been involved in the Housing Construction Savings Bank of Kazakhstan as the chairman of the Board of Directors since 2020.

== Awards ==
- Medal "Astana" (1998)
- Medal "10 Years of Independence of the Republic of Kazakhstan" (2001)
- Order of Kurmet (2008)
- Medal "20 Years of Independence of the Republic of Kazakhstan" (2011)
- Order of Parasat (2015)
- "Altyn Baryс" breastplate badge (2019)
