= Marat Qarabaev =

Kazakh politician

- Марат Қарабаев
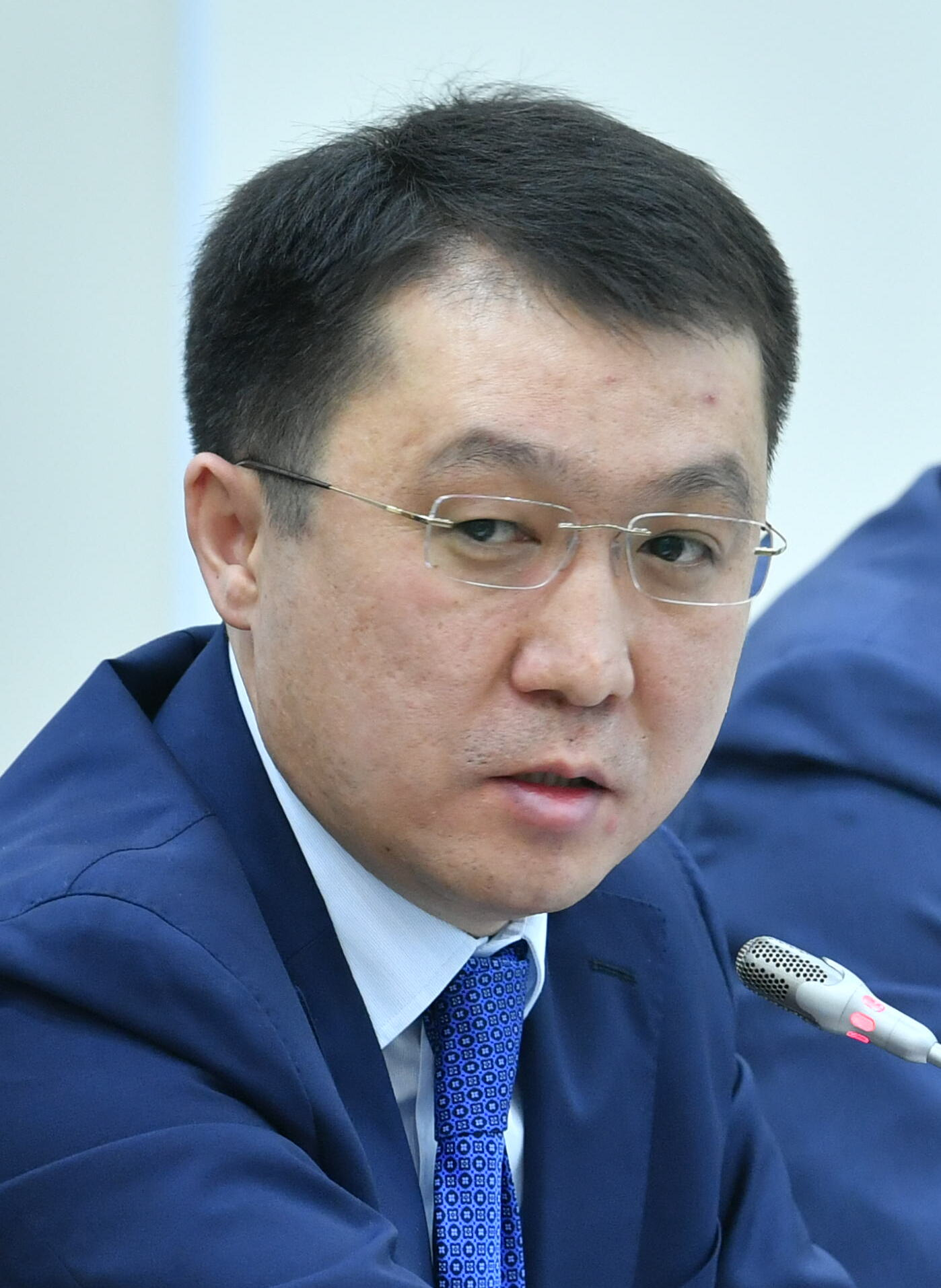
- Qarabaev in 2023

Minister of Transport
- In office 2 September 2023 – 8 June 2025
- President: Kassym-Jomart Tokayev
- Prime Minister: Älihan Smaiylov; Oljas Bektenov
- Preceded by: Office established
- Succeeded by: Nurlan Sauranbaev

Minister of Industry and Infrastructure Development
- In office 4 January 2023 – 2 September 2023
- President: Kassym-Jomart Tokayev
- Prime Minister: Älihan Smaiylov
- Preceded by: Qaiyrbek Öskenbaev
- Succeeded by: Qanat Şarlapaev (Industry and Construction)

Personal details
- Born: 7 July 1987 (age 39) Tashkent Region, Uzbek SSR, Soviet Union (now Uzbekistan)
- Education: Tashkent Automobile and Road Institute; University of Warwick; Dulaty University

Marat Kärimjanūly Qarabaev (Kazakh: Марат Кәрімжанұлы Қарабаев; born 4 July 1987) is a Kazakh politician who served as Minister of Transport of Kazakhstan from 2023 to 2025. Previously, he was the minister of industry and infrastructure development from 2023 to 2025 before its reorganization.

== Biography ==
Qarabaev was born in the Tashkent Region, Uzbek Soviet Socialist Republic, and is from the Sirgeli tribe. He graduated from the Tashkent Automobile and Road Institute in 2008 with a degree in construction of buildings and structures. In 2010, he received a degree in Production and Systems Engineering from the University of Warwick in England, graduating with honors. He later earned a degree in economics from Taraz Regional University named after M. Kh. Dulati in 2015.

His career began in 2011 as an intern and expert at the Committee on Water Resources of the Ministry of Agriculture of Kazakhstan. From August 2011 to March 2013, he worked as an expert and chief expert in the Ministry of Industry and New Technologies. In March 2013, he became head of the Transit Policy Department in the Ministry of Transport and Communications. From November 2013 to June 2014, he served as an adviser at the Regional Investment Center Maximum LLP under the Akimat of the South Kazakhstan Region. Between June 2014 and March 2017, he held positions as deputy head and later head of the regional Department of Entrepreneurship, Industrial and Innovative Development and Tourism.

From May 2018 to July 2020, Qarabaev was director of the department for the Development of the Military-Industrial Complex, first under the Ministry of Digital Development and later under the Ministry of Industry and Infrastructure Development. He then served as chairman of the Industrial Development Committee from 13 July 2020 and as Vice Minister of Industry and Infrastructure Development from 7 July 2021 to 2023.

On 4 January 2023, Qarabaev was appointed as Minister of Industry and Infrastructure Development, and he was reappointed to the same post on 4 April 2023. He then served as Minister of Transport from 2 September 2023 and was reappointed on 6 February 2024. On 14 May 2025, Qarabaev had received a reprimand from the president for shortcomings in his work. Tokayev criticised Qarabaev's handling with issues with border cargo flow, the poor condition of checkpoints, and delays in major transit infrastructure projects. When asked by reporters about the situation, Qarabaev said he had no plans to resign and stated that, as the first head of the re-established ministry, he would do his best to justify the trust placed in him. On 8 June 2025, he was dismissed by decree of President Kassym-Jomart Tokayev.

== See also ==
- First Smaiylov Government
- Second Smaiylov Government
- Bektenov Government
