= 2023 fires =

There have been a number of notable wildfires across the world in 2023. For information see:

- 2023 Hawaii wildfires
- 2023 Greece wildfires
- 2023 Canadian wildfires
- 2023 California wildfires
- 2023 Chile wildfires
- 2023 Italian wildfires
- 2023 Kazakhstan wildfires
- 2023 Washington wildfires
