= Shamsha Berkimbayeva =

Kazakh academic and politician (1942–2022)

Minister of Education and Science
- In office January 2002 – 14 June 2003
- President: Nursultan Nazarbayev
- Prime Minister: Islam Karimov
- Preceded by: Nuraly Bekturganov
- Succeeded by: Zhaksybek Kulekeyev

Member of the Supreme Soviet of the Kazakh Soviet Socialist Republic
- In office 1980–1984

Personal details
- Born: 10 October 1942 Turar, Kaskelen District, Kazakh SSR, Soviet Union
- Died: 7 April 2022 (aged 79)
- Party: CPSU
- Education: Kazakh National Women's Teacher Training University; Russian Academy of State Service

Shamsha Kopbaevna Berkimbayeva (Kazakh: Шәмшә Көпбайқызы Беркімбаева, Şämşä Köpbaiqyzy Berkımbaeva; 10 October 1942 – 7 April 2022) was a Kazakh academic and politician. She served as Minister of Education and Science from 2002 to 2003. She died on 7 April 2022 at the age of 79.
