= Älibek Quantyrov =

Kazakh politician (born 1983)

- Әлібек Қуантыров
- Official portrait

Minister of Ecology and Natural Resources of Kazakhstan
- Incumbent
- Assumed office 3 September 2026
- President: Kassym-Jomart Tokayev
- Prime Minister: Oljas Bektenov
- Preceded by: Erlan Nysanbaev

Deputy Minister of Foreign Affairs
- In office 30 July 2024 – 3 September 2026
- President: Kassym-Jomart Tokayev
- Prime Minister: Oljas Bektenov
- Minister: Murat Nurtileu; Ermek Köşerbaev

Minister of National Economy
- In office 11 January 2022 – 6 February 2024
- President: Kassym-Jomart Tokayev
- Prime Minister: Älihan Smaiylov
- Preceded by: Aset Irgaliyev
- Succeeded by: Nurlan Baibazarov

Personal details
- Born: 14 November 1983 (age 42) Guryev, Kazakh SSR, Soviet Union (now Atyrau, Kazakhstan)
- Education: Tomsk State University; University of Michigan
- Occupation: Financier
- Awards: Medal for Distinguished Labor

Älibek Säkenūly Quantyrov (Kazakh: Әлібек Сәкенұлы Қуантыров; born 14 November 1983) is a Kazakh politician, financier and diplomat serving as the Minister of Ecology and Natural Resources since 2026. Previously, he was the Deputy Minister of Foreign Affairs from 2024 to 2026 and Minister of National Economy from 2022 to 2024.

== Biography ==
=== Education and personal life ===
Born in Guryev (now Atyrau), Quantyrov graduated from Tomsk State University in 2006 with degrees in Finance and Credit, and in Linguistics and Intercultural Communication. In 2010, he received an M.A. in Applied Economics from the University of Michigan under the Bolashak international scholarship. He is a member of the Presidential Youth Personnel Reserve 1.0 and speaks Kazakh, English, Spanish, German, and Russian.

=== Career ===
From September 2005 to February 2006, he worked as a leading specialist in the Department of Internal Administration and the Department of International Relations of the Ministry of Economy and Budget Planning. In 2007, he completed a two-month internship and policy seminar at the Ministry of Finance of Japan in Tokyo.

Between February 2006 and October 2010, he was an expert and chief expert in the Department of Investment Policy and Planning of the Ministry of Economy and Budget Planning and later the Ministry of Economic Development and Trade. In November 2010, he became head of the Strategic Research Department of the Ministry of Economic Development and Trade.

From 2010 to 2013, he served as deputy director of the Department of Budget Policy and Planning and the Department of Budget Planning and Forecasting at the Ministry of Finance. In 2013, he worked as deputy chairman of the Committee for Geology and Subsoil Use of the Ministry of Industry and New Technologies.

From June 2013 to April 2019, Quantyrov held posts in the Administration of the President as deputy head of the Center for Strategic Research and Analysis and Deputy Head of the Department of Socio-Economic Monitoring. Between April 2019 and February 2021, he was deputy head of the Office of the First President – Elbasy of the Republic of Kazakhstan.

From 25 February 2021, he served as Vice Minister of National Economy.

Quantyrov was appointed Minister of National Economy on 11 January 2022 by President Kassym-Jomart Tokayev, during which he outlined the government's anti-inflation plan to the Mäjilis, reporting that utility tariff hikes had been frozen, exports of key goods restricted, six-month fuel caps and export bans introduced, and proposing further steps such as boosting spring sowing financing, expanding import-substitution projects, tightening market and price monitoring, reducing intermediaries in fuel markets, and revising the agro-industrial subsidy system. Quantyrov was later reappointed on 4 April 2023, serving in this post until 6 February 2024, when he was replaced by Nurlan Baibazarov following the resignation of Älihan Smaiylov's government.

On 1 April 2024, he became CEO of the Kazenergy Association.

On 30 July 2024, by president Kassym-Jomart Tokayev's decree Quantyrov was appointed deputy minister of foreign affairs of Murat Nurtileu.

Following the resignation of the first Oljas Bektenov Government, on 3 September 2026, Älibek Quantyrov's candidacy for minister of ecology and natural resources was approved by the Kurultai and confirmed by Tokayev's decree, after which he joined the second Bektenov Government.

== Awards ==
- Medal for Distinguished Labor (2017)
