= Tamara Duisenova =

Kazakh politician and economist (born 1965)

- Тамара Дүйсенова
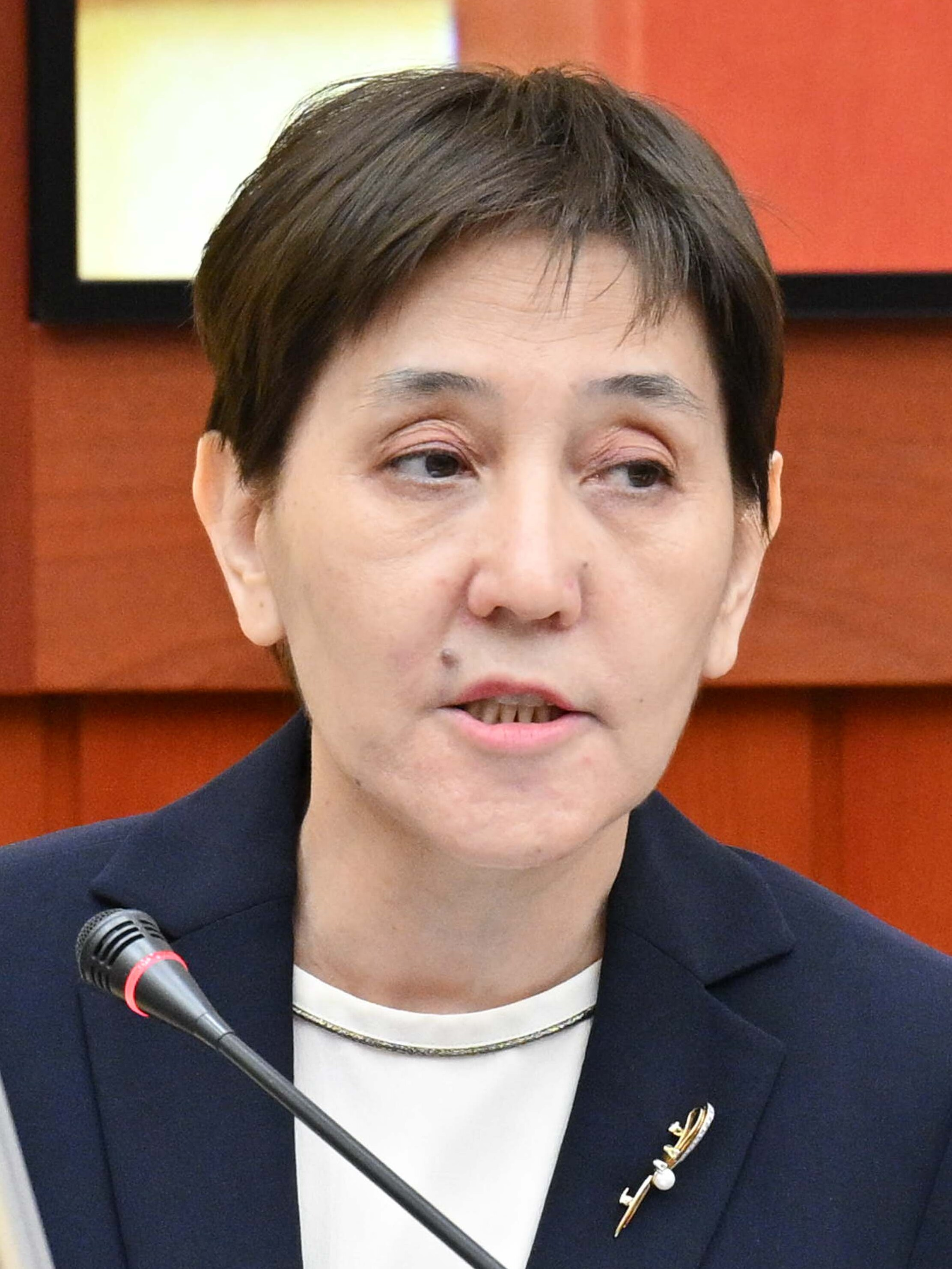
- Düisenova in 2024

Assistant to the President
- In office 14 February 2025 – 25 September 2025
- President: Kassym-Jomart Tokayev

Deputy Prime Minister of Kazakhstan
- In office 8 June 2023 – 14 February 2025
- President: Kassym-Jomart Tokayev
- Prime Minister: Älihan Smaiylov
- Preceded by: Altai Kölgınov
- Succeeded by: Ermek Köşerbaev

Minister of Labour and Social Protection of the Population
- In office 11 April 2022 – 2 September 2023
- President: Kassym-Jomart Tokayev
- Prime Minister: Älihan Smaiylov
- Preceded by: Serik Şapkenov
- Succeeded by: Svetlana Jaqypova
- In office 25 January 2017 – 9 February 2018
- President: Nursultan Nazarbayev
- Prime Minister: Bakhytzhan Sagintayev
- Preceded by: Office reestablished
- Succeeded by: Madina Abilqasymova
- In office 27 June 2013 – 6 August 2014; Acting: 10 June 2013 – 27 June 2013
- President: Nursultan Nazarbayev
- Prime Minister: Serik Akhmetov; Karim Massimov
- Preceded by: Serik Abdenov
- Succeeded by: Office abolished

Minister of Healthcare and Social Development
- In office 6 August 2014 – 25 January 2017
- President: Nursultan Nazarbayev
- Prime Minister: Karim Massimov; Bakhytzhan Sagintayev
- Preceded by: Salidat Qaiyrbekova (Healthcare)
- Succeeded by: Eljan Birtanov (Healthcare)

Personal details
- Born: 11 January 1965 (age 61) Leninskoye, Kazakh SSR, Soviet Union
- Party: Nur Otan
- Education: Tashkent State University of Economics

Tamara Bosymbekqyzy Düisenova (Note: Kazakh: Тамара Босымбекқызы Дүйсенова) (Note: Despite the patronymic Bosymbekqyzy, Düisenova's father was named Qasym, not Bosymbek. For more information, see the Personal life section) (born January 11, 1965) is a Kazakh politician and economist, who's served as Assistant to the President from 14 February 2025 to 25 September 2025.

A member of the ruling Amanat party and a candidate of Economic Sciences, Düisenova has previously served as Deputy Prime Minister from 2023 to 2025, as Minister of Labour and Social Protection of the Population three different times, and as Minister of Health and Social Development from 2013 to 2014.

== Early life and education ==
Duisenova was born in the village of Leninskoye in Turkistan Region. In 1987, she graduated from the Tashkent State University of Economics with a degree in engineer-economist.

== Early career ==
Duisenova began her career in 1988 as a high school teacher in computer science in the Saryagash District. From 1988 to 1992, she worked as an economist at the Research Institute of Economics and Standards under the State Planning Committee of the Uzbek SSR.

In 1992, Duisenova became a senior economist in the Saryagash Regional Administration. From 1993 to 1994, she served as the head of the department of the Perizat-holding company.

== Political career ==
From 1994 to 1997, Duisenova was an adviser, deputy and first deputy akim of the Saryagash District. In 1997, she became the first deputy akim of the city of Shymkent. From 1999 to 2002, Duisenova served as a deputy akim of South Kazakhstan Region until she was appointed as a Vice Minister of Labor and Social Protection in 2002. She again became the deputy akim of South Kazakhstan in 2006 until becoming the executive secretary of the Ministry of Labor and Social Protection.

In February 2013, Duisenova was appointed to be the Vice Minister Labor and Social Protection and from 10 June 2013, she served as the Acting Minister until becoming fully appointed to the position on 27 June 2013.

After the ministry was abolished on 6 August 2014, Duisenova served as the Minister of Healthcare and Social Development until 25 January 2017 when Ministry of Labor and Social Protection was reestablished. She was dismissed on 9 February 2018 and was shortly appointed as a secretary of Nur Otan on 22 February 2018. Duisenova served the post until being relieved on 9 July 2019 and becoming head of the JCS Center for the Development of Human Resources on 15 July 2019.

From May 5, 2020 to April 11, 2022, she was an assistant to the President Kassym-Jomart Tokayev and head of the department for monitoring the consideration of appeals of the Presidential Administration.

From April 11, 2022 to September 2, 2023, she was appointed Labor and Social Protection of Population Minister of the Republic of Kazakhstan.

On June 8, 2023, she was appointed Deputy Prime Minister of Kazakhstan.

== Personal life ==
Despite her patronymic being, as stated in documentation, Bosymbekqyzy, Duisenova's father was named Qasym, and not Bosymbek. In Kazakh-language sources, both patronymics are sometimes used. As explained by Duisenova herself, while signing the birth certificate of her daughter, Duisenova's mother, due to a Kazakh tradition, felt it was taboo to pronounce her husband's name, and thus his nickname was written down.

Duisenova speaks Kazakh, Russian, English, German, and Uzbek.
