= Alexey Tsoy =

Kazakh politician (born 1977)

- Алексей Цой
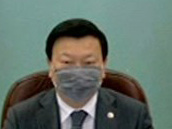
- Tsoy in 2021

Advisor to the President of the Republic of Kazakhstan on Social Issues
- Incumbent
- Assumed office 14 October 2025
- President: Kassym-Jomart Tokayev

Minister of Health of Kazakhstan
- In office 25 June 2020 – 20 December 2021
- President: Kassym-Jomart Tokayev
- Prime Minister: Askar Mamin
- Preceded by: Eljan Birtanov
- Succeeded by: Ajar Ğiniat

Personal details
- Born: 2 April 1977 (age 49) Chimkent, Kazakh SSR, Soviet Union
- Party: Amanat
- Children: 3
- Education: South Kazakhstan Medical Academy; Daneker Institute of International Law and International Business
- Profession: endoscopist

Alexey Vladimirovich Tsoy (Russian: Алексей Владимирович Цой; born 2 April 1977) is a Kazakh politician and Advisor to the President of the Republic of Kazakhstan on Social Issues (since October 14, 2025)

== Early life and education ==
He was born in Chimkent (now Shymkent) in 1977. In 2001, he graduated from the South Kazakhstan Medical Academy. In 2007, he finished Daneker Institute of International Law and International Business and then Public Administration and International Business Academy in 2015, SELS college London (United Kingdom), Almaty Management University. Academic degree: MD, PhD, LLB, DBA

== Early career ==
From 2001 to 2007, he was an endoscopist surgeon, senior researcher at the Center for Reconstructive Surgery and Transplantology, leading researcher at the Center for Internal Medicine, RSE “National Scientific Medical Center” of the Ministry of Healthcare. 2002-2004 - Territory Development Manager for “GlaxoSmithKline”pharmaceutical company. 2006-2009 - General Secretary of NGO "Eurasian Respiratory Society”. He worked as the director of the RSE “Center for the Implementation of Modern Medical Technologies” in the Office of the President of Kazakhstan. 2010-2011 - Head of the State Institution "Medical Center of the President’s Affairs Administration of the Republic of Kazakhstan" (political governmental service)”. In 2011, since 2011 as a Chief Medical Officer of Astana City Hospital No. 1.

== Political career ==
On 30 December 2014, he was appointed as the Vice Minister of Health and Social Protection of Kazakhstan. After the ministry was separated, he was appointed as the Vice Minister of Healthcare on 17 February 2017. On 19 February 2019, he became the Chief Executive of the Medical Center of the President’s Affairs Administration of the Republic of Kazakhstan.

He was appointed as Acting and the First Vice Minister of Healthcare on 22 June 2020. Three days later, on 25 June, he was succeeded as the new minister.

October 31, 2022 has been appointed Chief Executive of the Medical Center of the President's Affairs Administration of the Republic of Kazakhstan.

October 14, 2025, he was appointed Advisor to the President of the Republic of Kazakhstan on Social Issues.

== International activities ==
From 2006 to 2009 worked as General Secretary of the Euro-Asian Respiratory Society, in 2017-2019 was the Chairman of the Country Coordinating Committee for the Global Fund. Represented Kazakhstan at several World Assemblies of the World Health Organization (WHO).

In 2018 was the head of the organizing committee of the Global Conference on Primary Health Care organized by WHO, in 2019 – 2020 member of the Board of the Stop TB Partnership.

In 2016, 2018 and 2020 also officially represented Kazakhstan at the 71st, 73rd and 75th sessions of the United Nations General Assembly held in New York, USA.

In 2020 Head the 70th session of the WHO Regional Committee for Europe, as well as underwent internships on health management and participated in international conferences in the USA, Singapore, Germany, Austria, Italy, South Korea, Switzerland, Denmark, France and other countries.

== Languages ==
Russian, Kazakh and English
