= Ruslan Jaqsylyqov =

Kazakh Colonel general

Colonel general Ruslan Jaqsylyqov
- Руслан Жақсылықов
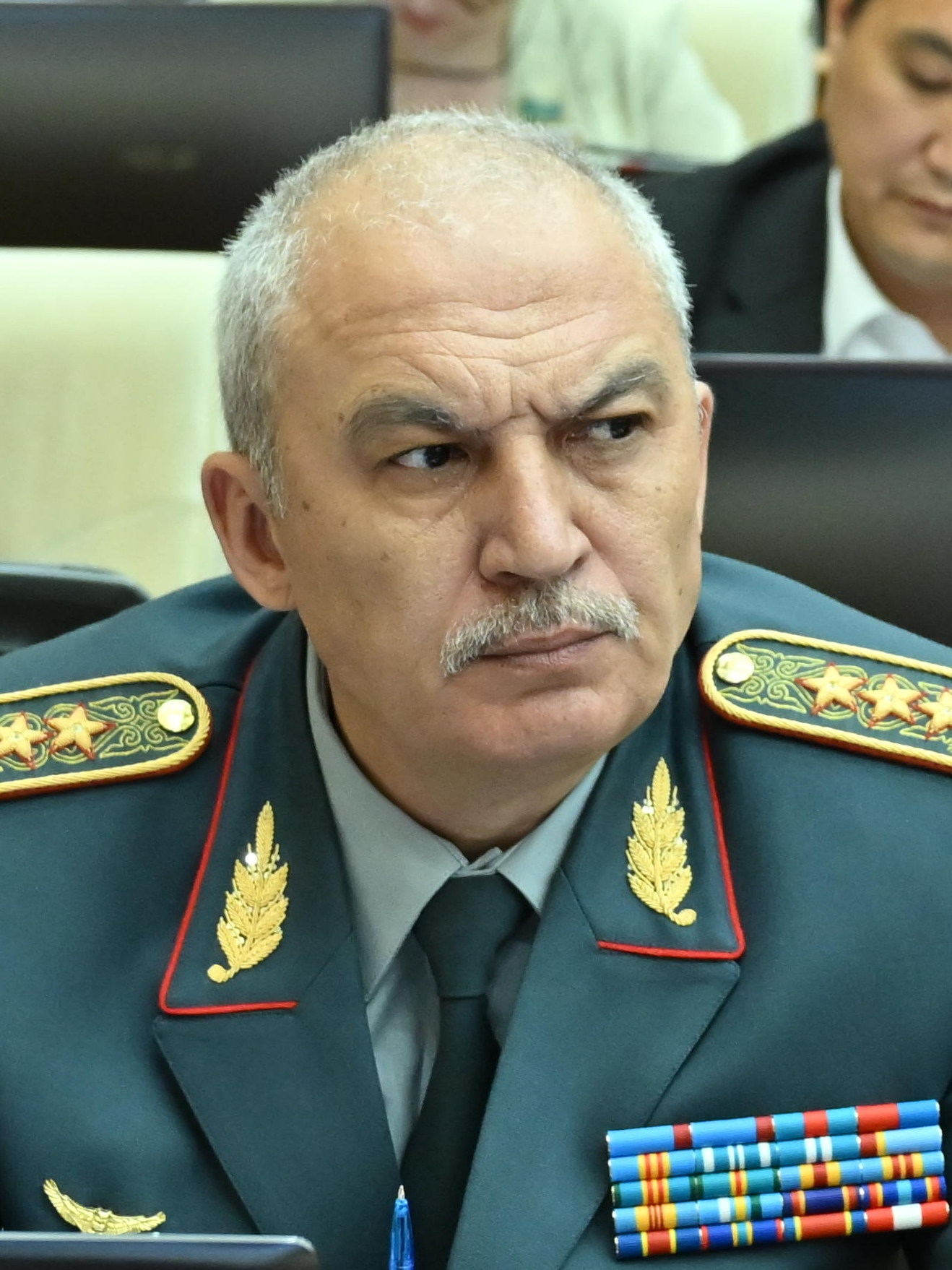
- Jaqsylyqov in 2023

Deputy Head of the Office of the Security Council of Kazakhstan
- Incumbent
- Assumed office 5 September 2026
- President: Kassym-Jomart Tokayev
- Preceded by: Office established

First Deputy Secretary of the Security Council
- In office 30 June 2025 – 5 September 2026
- President: Kassym-Jomart Tokayev
- Preceded by: Murat Baimuqaşev (2023)
- Succeeded by: Office abolished

Minister of Defence
- In office 19 January 2022 – 8 June 2025
- President: Kassym-Jomart Tokayev
- Prime Minister: Älihan Smaiylov; Oljas Bektenov
- Preceded by: Murat Bektanov
- Succeeded by: Däuren Qosanov

Commander-in-Chief of the National Guard
- In office 21 April 2014 – 19 January 2022
- President: Nursultan Nazarbayev; Kassym-Jomart Tokayev
- Preceded by: Office established; (himself as Commander-in-Chief of the Internal Troops)
- Succeeded by: Erkin Botaqanov

Commander-in-Chief of the Internal Troops
- In office 4 September 2008 – 21 April 2014
- President: Nursultan Nazarbayev
- Preceded by: Kairbek Suleimenov
- Succeeded by: Office abolished; (himself as Commander-in-Chief of the National Guard)

Member of the Shymkent City Mäslihat
- In office 2003–2004

Personal details
- Born: 4 March 1966 (age 60) Kaskelen, Kazakh SSR, Soviet Union
- Education: Alma-Ata Higher Combined Arms Command School; Frunze Military Academy; Military Academy of the General Staff of the Armed Forces of Russia

Military service
- Allegiance: Soviet Union (1987–1991); Kazakhstan (1991–present)
- Branch/service: Armed Forces of Kazakhstan
- Years of service: 1991–present
- Rank: Colonel general

Ruslan Fatihūly Jaqsylyqov (Note: Often transliterated as Ruslan Fatikhovich Zhaksylykov through a Russified Romanization of Руслан Фатихович Жаксылыков.) (Kazakh: Руслан Фатихұлы Жақсылықов, [ro̙wɯsˈɫɑn fɑˈtʰɪχo̙ɫɯ ʐɑqsɯˈɫɯqɯf]: born 4 March 1966) is a Kazakh colonel general serving as the deputy head of the Office of the Security Council since 2026. He previously served as Minister of Defence from 2022 to 2025.

== Biography ==
=== Early life and education ===
Jaqsylyqov was born in the city of Kaskelen in Almaty Region. From 1983, he attended the Alma-Ata Higher Combined Arms Command School where Jaqsylyqov was taught tactical commanding before graduating in 1987. From the mid 1990's, Jaqsylyqov resided in Russia where he attended the Frunze Military Academy and earned specialty in "Command-staff operational-tactical military intelligence" in 1996 and then the Military Academy of the General Staff of the Armed Forces of Russia where Jaqsylqov learned "Military security of the state" specialty in 2004.

=== Career ===
In September 2003, Jaqsylyqov was elected as member of the Shymkent City Mäslihat where he worked for short time until February 2004, when he became the brigade commander of the internal troops under the Ministry of Internal Affairs.

From 2006, Jaqsylyqov served as a deputy commander of internal troops before being promoted as first deputy commander and chief of the main staff in 2007. On 4 September 2008, he was appointed as a full commander and served the post until 22 January 2013, when he became the commander-in-chief. From 24 April 2014, Jaqsylyqov headed the National Guard as a commander-in-chief.

On 29 September 2021, while commanding the National Guard, Jaqsylyqov became Deputy Minister of Internal Affairs.

=== Minister of Defence ===
Following the 2022 Kazakh unrest, he was appointed as the Defence Minister on 19 January 2022 by President Kassym-Jomart Tokayev, replacing Murat Bektanov who was shortly arrested due to his handling failure in the unrest. During visit to the garrison in Almaty on 11 February 2022, Jaqsylyqov awarded servicemen who were injured in the riots, noting that all military personnel will continue serving in the Armed Forces. On 8 June, 2025, Tokayev replaced Jaqsylyqov with Däuren Qosanov as defense minister, appointing him first deputy Secretary of the Security Council on 30 June.

On 29 August 2026, a new body, the Office of the Security Council was established within the Security Council, resulting in the abolition of the positions of secretary, deputy secretary, and first deputy secretary. On September 5, Kassym-Jomart Tokayev appointed Ruslan Jaqsylyqov as deputy head of the Security Council Office under Murat Baimuqaşev.

== Controversies ==
In an August 2019 report published by Time.kz, Jaqsylyqov while serving as lieutenant-general was accused of extorting money from the V.S. GOLD COMPANY LLP., a contract company which provided meals to the regional Kazakh National Guard personnel, resulting in funds being slashed that would have otherwise covered the costs for meals with the unit servicemen being left more malnourished while Jaqsylyqov among other high-ranking officers according to the report, were living a luxurious lifestyle by staying at five star hotels and ordering coffee, soft drinks and ice cream at VIP-terminals at the expense of the company's money.

Jaqsylyqov has been repeatedly criticised for his inadequate fluency in the Kazakh language. At one occasion, he refused to answer a question in the state language, fueling controversy.
