= Azhar Giniyat =

Kazakh politician

Ajar Ğiniat
- Ажар Ғиният
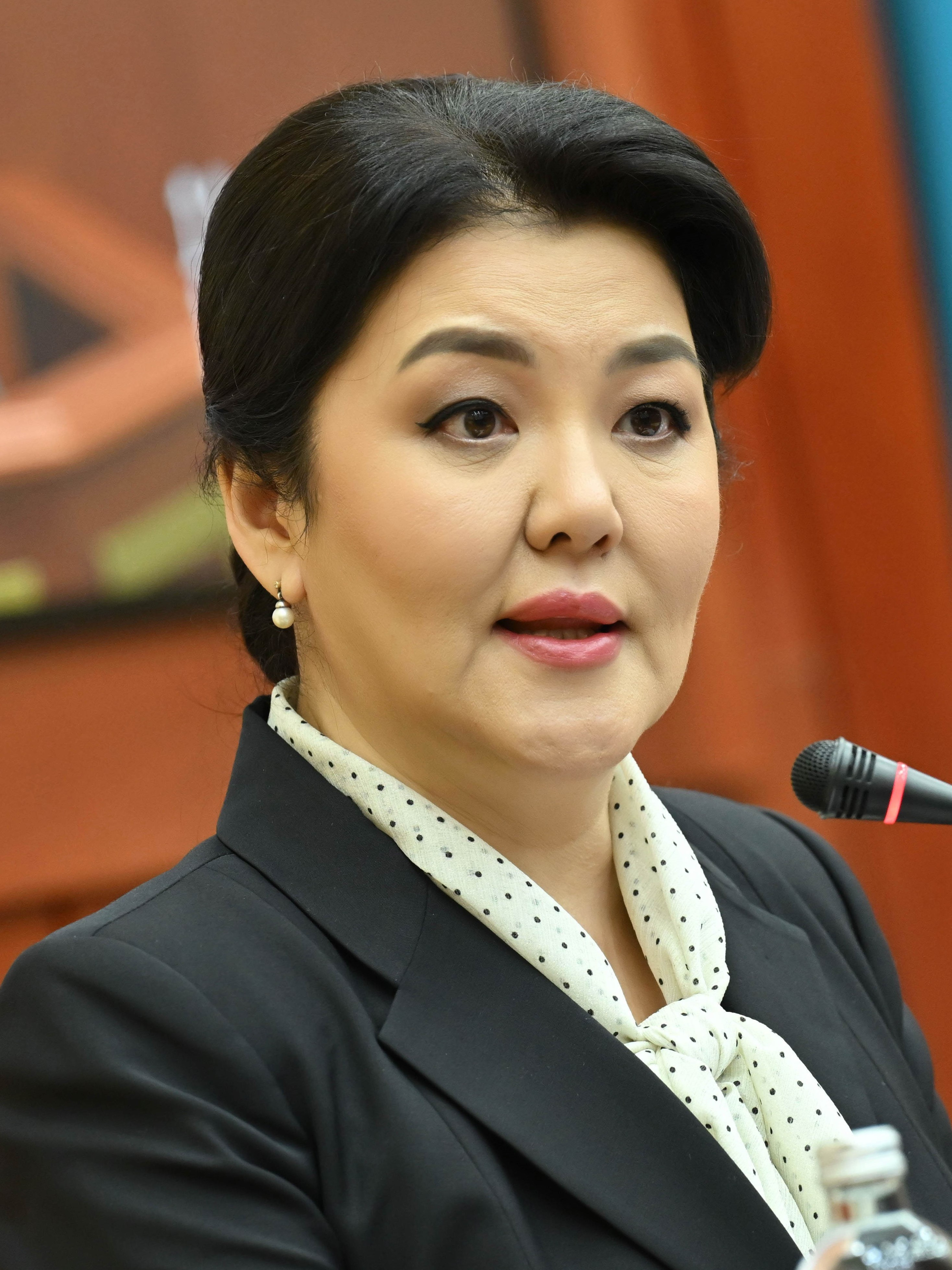
- Giniat in 2024

Minister of Healthcare
- In office 11 January 2022 – 05 February 2024
- President: Kassym-Jomart Tokayev
- Prime Minister: Alikhan Smailov
- Preceded by: Alexey Tsoi
- Succeeded by: Akmaral Alnazarova

Personal details
- Born: 8 June 1969 (age 57) West Kazakhstan Province, Kazakh SSR
- Education: Yessenov University; West Kazakhstan State Medical University named after Marat Ospanov

Ajar Giniyatovna Giniyat (Tulegaliyeva) (Kazakh: Ажар Ғиниятқызы Ғиният, Ajar Ğiniatqyzy Ğiniat; born in West Kazakhstan Province on June 8, 1969, Kazakhstani SSR) is a Kazakhstani politician, who served as the Minister of Health of Kazakhstan from January 11, 2022 to February 5, 2024.

Giniyat is a member of the Board of the Kazakh Badge of Honor Research Institute of Eye Diseases, The Academician Jarbusynov Scientific Center for Urology and The National Scientific Center for Cardiac Surgery.

== Biography ==
Born in West Kazakhstan Province, Ajar graduated from Aktobe State Institute of Medicine with a degree in Paediatrics in 1992; she also holds diplomas in Local and State Governance (Yesenov University, Aktau) and Business Administration (Almaty Management University МВА, 2015).

Ms. Giniyat started her career in Atyrau in 1992 with a 2-year spell as a primary care paediatrician. In 1994 she moved to an Aktau primary healthcare unit where she progressed from an infectious disease doctor to head of the department. In 1999, she became a deputy chief physician at the Aktau Infectious Diseases Hospital. In 2005, Ms. Giniyat was appointed Director of the Department of Health of the Mangystau Province. She has held various leadership positions in the healthcare industry since then. Ms. Giniyat served as deputy head of the Medical Center of the Administrative Office of the President of the Republic of Kazakhstan from September 2017 until June 2020, after that, she was appointed Vice Minister of Health. Ms. Giniyat spearheaded a pro-vaccination campaign and delivered numerous related briefings during the COVID-19 pandemic. She also proposed allocating funds from Qazaqstan Halqyna (social fund) towards treatment of children suffering from rare diseases.

In January 2022, in her capacity of Minister of Health Ms. Giniyat joined Alikhan Smailov's cabinet as the only female minister in the new government. She was re-appointed to that position in April 2023.

On March 15, 2024, has been appointed the head of the NJSC National Children’s Rehabilitation Center.

== Awards ==
- 2006 — Ajar Public Recognition of Kazakhstani Women's Contribution National Award for Public Administration;
- 2010 — сontribution to the Development of Healthcare in Kazakhstan Badge (awarded by the MoH);
- 2015 — 20 Years Medal of the Assembly of People of Kazakhstan;
- 2016 — 25 Years of Independence of the Republic of Kazakhstan Medal;
- 2021 — Order of Kurmet;
- 2022 — WHO Regional Director for Europe Hans Kluge Award.
