= Turan University =

One of the first and largest non-state universities in Almaty, Kazakhstan

- Тұран Университеті
- Motto: Turan for those who believe in themselves and strive for success
- Type: Private
- Established: 1992
- Chairman: Seidumanov S.T.
- Rector: Alshanov R.A.
- Students: 5000
- Undergraduates: 3000
- Postgraduates: 2000
- Location: Almaty, Kazakhstan; 43.2374°N 76.9404°E
- Website: turan.edu.kz/en/

University rankings

Regional – Overall
- QS Asia: 751-800 (2025)
- QS Emerging Europe and Central Asia: 401-450 (2022)

Turan University (Kazakh: Тұран Университеті, Tūran Universitetı; Russian: Университет Туран) is one of the first and largest non-state universities in Almaty, Kazakhstan. It was established in 1992. Turan University is a full-cycle educational institution, encompassing a lyceum, college, bachelor's, master's, and doctoral programs.

Turan University's educational system includes three faculties: Humanities and Law, Economics, Academy of Film and Television. The university employs 361 full-time teachers, including 55 doctors of science, professors, 215 candidates of science and associate professors, and 1 Ph.D. In addition to them, the educational process provides more than 49 practitioners, scientists, and teachers.

== Campus ==
The university has its own campus with a total area of 35 000 m^{2}. The main building is seven storeys tall and hosts the administration and the Economics, Humanities and Law faculties. The campus includes three football pitches, three sports halls, and a dormitory.

== Academics ==
Educational Corporation "Turan" is a holistic system that provides the principle of continuity and multi-stage education, and includes:

- 2 universities (Almaty and Nur-Sultan)
- 3 Colleges (Almaty and Nur-Sultan)
- Lyceum (Almaty)
- Educational and recreational complex "Tau-Turan"

=== Academic Structure ===
The university offers its educational programs through the following faculties and schools:

Schools:

- School of Humanities and Law
- School of Business and Information Technologies

Faculties:

- Faculty of Business and Management (Engineering and Economics)
- Faculty of Information Technologies and Services
