= Bureau of National Statistics of the Republic of Kazakhstan =

Government statistical agency of Kazakhstan

Committee on Statistics of Ministry of National Economy of the Republic of Kazakhstan
- Kazakh: Қазақстан Республикасы Ұлттық экономика министрлігі Статистика комитеті

Agency overview
- Formed: 8 November 1920; 105 years ago
- Preceding agency: Agency of Statistics of Kazakhstan till 2014
- Jurisdiction: Government of Kazakhstan
- Headquarters: Nur-Sultan, Kazakhstan, Left bank of the Ishim River, Mangilik el str., 8; House of the Ministries, 4th Entrance
- Employees: Central - 290, regional - ?
- Annual budget: 16 736 125 500 tenge (2020)
- Minister responsible: Nurbolat Aidapkelov
- Agency executive: Nurbolat Aidapkelov, chairman
- Parent department: Ministry of National Economy Republic of Kazakhstan
- Child agency: The Republican State Enterprise "Information and Computing Center of the Agency of the Republic of Kazakhstan on Statistics"
- Website: https://stat.gov.kz/

Committee on Statistics of Ministry of National Economy of the Republic of Kazakhstan (Kazakh: Қазақстан Республикасы Ұлттық экономика министрлігі Статистика комитеті, romanized: Qazaqstan Respublikasy Ūlttyq ekonomika ministrlıgı Statistika komitetı; Russian: Комитет по статистике Министерство национальной экономики Республики Казахстан) is the empowered structure, forming and realizing State policy in the field of statistics, work out and implement programs to perfect the statistics in the Republic of Kazakhstan.

== Functions and goals ==
The main objectives are as follows:

- formating of statistical methodology;
- implementation of statistical activities in compliance with the principles of state statistics;
- meet the needs of society, government, and the international community in official statistics.

== Structure ==
=== Central ===
On 2020. 290 people.

- Division of national accounts
- Division of national accounts
- Division of structural statistics
- Division of price statistics
- Division of production and environment statistics
- Division of services and energy statistics
- Division of social and demographic statistics
- Division of labor and standard of living statistics
- Division of statistical registers and classifications
- Division of IT management
- Division of work with users
- Division of finance and documentation support
- Law division
- International statistical cooperation division
- Human resources division
- Subdivision for protection of state secrets
- Division on preparation and holding of national censuses
- Division of control with regard to administrative sources
- Division of statistics of goals and sustainable development

=== Regional ===
on 2020

- Akmola Region statistic department
- Aktobe Region statistic department
- Almaty statistic department
- Almaty Region statistic department
- Nur-Sultan statistic department
- Atyrau Region statistic department
- East Kazakhstan Region statistic department
- Jambyl Region statistic department
- Karaganda Region statistic department
- Kostanay Region statistic department
- Kyzylorda Region statistic department
- Mangystau Region statistic department
- North Kazakhstan Region statistic department
- Pavlodar Region statistic department
- Shymkent statistic department
- Turkistan Region statistic department
- West Kazakhstan Region statistic department

== Subordinate organizations ==
The Republican State Enterprise "Information and Computing Center of the Agency of the Republic of Kazakhstan on Statistics" is subordinate to the Agency of the Republic of Kazakhstan on Statistics.

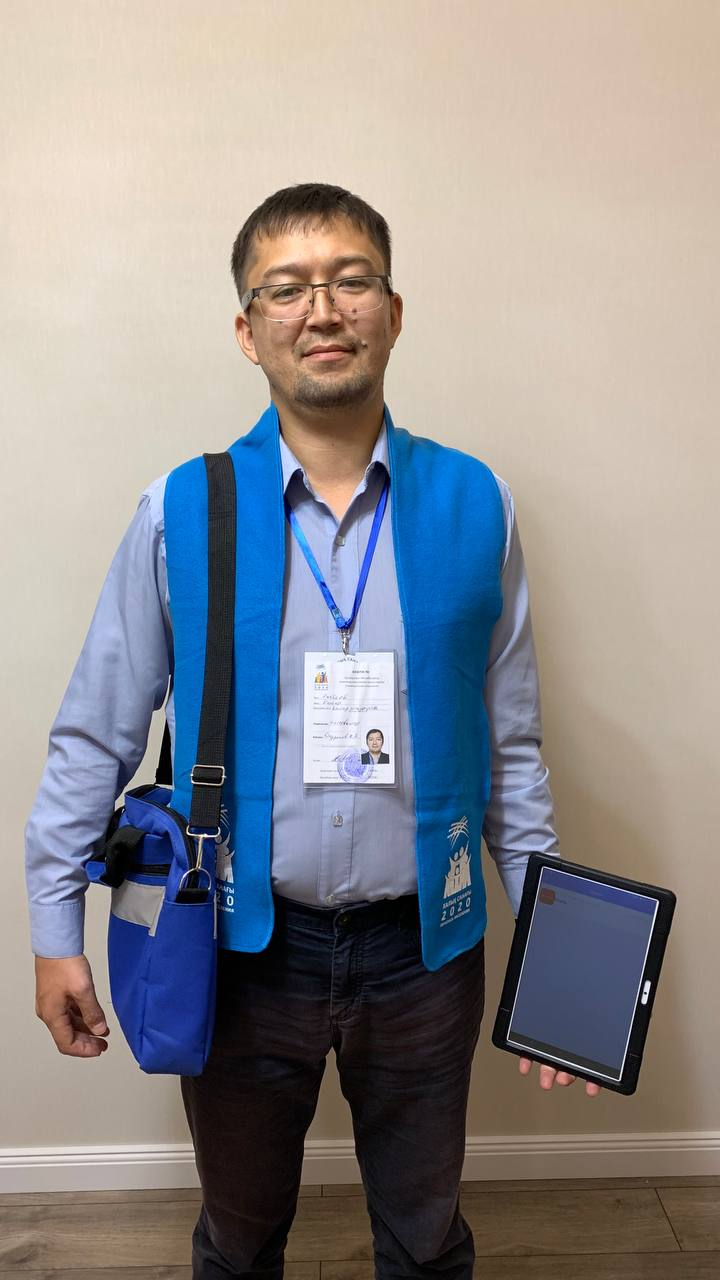
Enumerator in census of Kazakhstan 2021
