= Azamat Esqaraev =

Kazakh politician and diplomat (born 1979)

- Азамат Есқараев
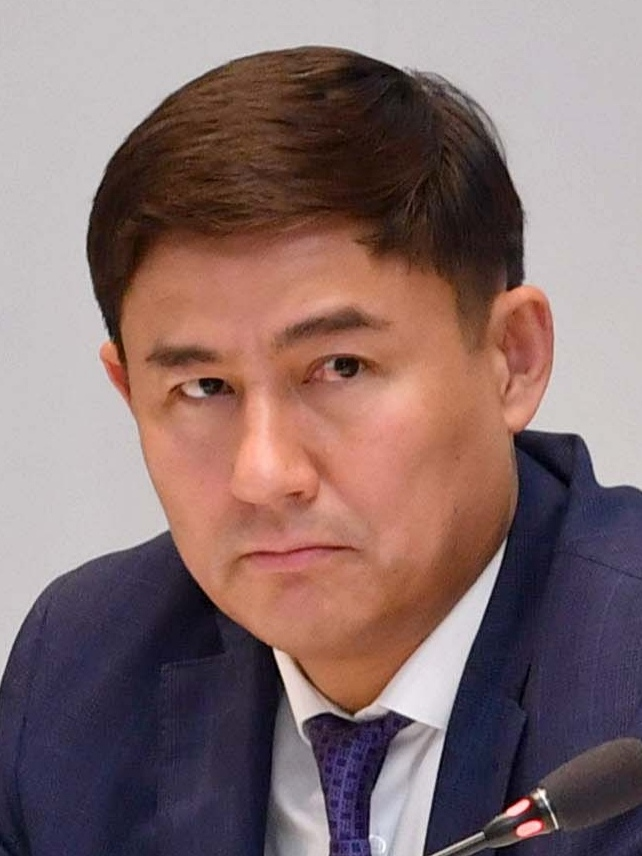
- Esqaraev in 2023

Kazakh ambassador to India
- Incumbent
- Assumed office 7 April 2025
- President: Kassym-Jomart Tokayev

Minister of Justice
- In office 4 January 2023 – 9 January 2025; Acting: 5 – 6 February 2024
- President: Kassym-Jomart Tokayev
- Prime Minister: Älihan Smaiylov; Roman Sklyar (acting); Oljas Bektenov
- Preceded by: Qanat Musin
- Succeeded by: Erlan Särsembaev

Personal details
- Born: 7 October 1979 (age 46) Alma-Ata, Kazakh SSR, Soviet Union (now Almaty, Kazakhstan)
- Education: Kazakh State Law Academy
- Occupation: Statesman, diplomat

Azamat Nesipbaiuly Esqaraev (Kazakh: Азамат Несіпбайұлы Есқараев; born 7 October 1979) is a Kazakh politician and diplomat. He served as the minister of justice from 2023 to 2025. Since April 2025, he has been the ambassador extraordinary and plenipotentiary of Kazakhstan to the Republic of India.

== Biography ==
=== Early life and career ===
Esqaraev was born on 7 October 1979 in Almaty and graduated from the Kazakh State Law Academy.

He began his career in 1996 as a worker at DEZ-2 in Almaty and later worked in commercial trade. After completing his legal education, he joined the Ministry of Justice of the Republic of Kazakhstan, where he held a number of positions, including leadership roles in the departments of legislation, by-laws, analytics, and strategic planning.

From 2003 to 2005, Esqaraev led the Department of By-Law Acts (Department of Acts Dependent on the Law). He then served as Chief Inspector of the Almaty City Akimat until 2006.

In 2006–2007, he moved to Astana, where he served as general manager of the Legal Service Department of the ''Kazyna Sustainable Development Fund'' JSC. During the same period, he also worked as a legal consultant at the Ministry of Justice and as a leading specialist in the Department of Internal Administration.

From July 2007 to 2008, Esqaraev was assistant to Minister of Justice Zagipa Balieva. He subsequently served as director of the Department of Analysis and Strategic Planning of the Ministry of Justice until 2009.

From 2012 to 2014, he headed the organizational and control department of the Agency for Combating Economic Crime and Corruption (EDCCA).

Between 2014 and 2019, Esqaraev served as Deputy Head of the Legal Department of the Office of the Prime Minister. From 2019 until January 2023, he was Head of the Legal Department of the Prime Minister's Office.

Since 27 January 2023, he has also been a member of the Commission on Human Rights under the President of the Republic of Kazakhstan.

=== Minister of Justice ===
On 4 January 2023, Esqaraev was appointed Minister of Justice of Kazakhstan by President Kassym-Jomart Tokayev. He was reappointed on 4 April 2023 and 6 February 2024.

As Minister of Justice, Esqaraev oversaw the settlement of the long-running dispute between Kazakhstan and Anatol and Gabriel Stati. In December 2024, the Government of Kazakhstan, the National Bank and the Stati parties, with the participation of Tristan Oil's creditors, reached an agreement that ended the litigation that had been ongoing since 2010 over terminated subsoil contracts. Under his leadership, the ministry expanded digital services in the justice sector. Key initiatives included the Digital Justice program, which introduced online notarial services, digital powers of attorney, automated forensic systems (E-Saraptama), and updated certification procedures for legal professionals. A pilot "bailiff robot" project was also launched to automate parts of enforcement proceedings. During his tenure, the ministry conducted legal reviews and supported more than 100 bills, including legislation related to women's and children's rights, healthcare, education, and business regulation.

He served until 9 January 2025 when he was dismissed by presidential decree. According to analysts cited by Orda, Yeskaraev's dismissal was linked to complaints about the Ministry of Justice's performance, including inefficiency, lack of transparency, and poorly prepared draft laws. Political scientist Zamir Qarajanov called the removal expected, arguing that the ministry's failures weakened confidence in presidential reforms. Some experts also viewed the appointment of Erlan Särsembaev—who previously worked in the NSC—as a sign of growing influence of security agencies. Others noted positive developments under Esqaraev, including the Ministry's formal recognition of the Bar and improvements to state-guaranteed legal aid tariffs.

=== Diplomatic service ===
On 7 April 2025, Esqaraev was appointed Ambassador Extraordinary and Plenipotentiary of Kazakhstan to the Republic of India.
