= 2023 Kazakhstan wildfires =

- Date: June 2023
- Location: Northeastern Kazakhstan

Statistics
- Burned area: 60,000 ha (150,000 acres)

Impacts
- Deaths: 15
- Structures lost: 3

Ignition
- Cause: Lightning, arson

In June 2023, large forest fires broke out in the northeastern regions of Kazakhstan experienced its greatest annual death toll. While putting out the fires, at least 15 people died.

== Background ==
According to local officials, lightning ignited the fires. A total of 60,000 hectares of land were lost. Residents of several villages were evacuated

== Response ==
On 10 June 2023, more than 1,000 emergency personnel battled an out-of-control fire. Yuri Ilyin, the Minister of Emergency Situations, was fired by Kazakh President Kassym-Jomart Tokayev earlier that day. The condolences of Russian President Vladimir Putin, Turkish President Recep Tayyip Erdoğan, Kyrgyz President Sadyr Japarov and other leaders have been extended to Tokayev.

== Aftermath ==
The day of national mourning, 12 June, was established by President Kassym-Jomart Tokayev in memory of the forest workers who perished while battling wildfires in Kazakhstan's eastern Abai Region. The investigation is yet to be concluded; former Minister of Emergency Situations Yuri Ilyin, Minister of Ecology, Geology and Natural Resources Zülfia Süleimenova, Äkim of Abai Region Nūrlan Ūranhaev and former Äkim of East Kazakhstan Region Daniyal Ahmetov are to be questioned regarding the wildfire
