= Darkhan Kydyrali =

Kazakh scholar and author (born 1974)

Darkhan Kuandykuly Kydyrali
- Дархан Қуандықұлы Қыдырәлі
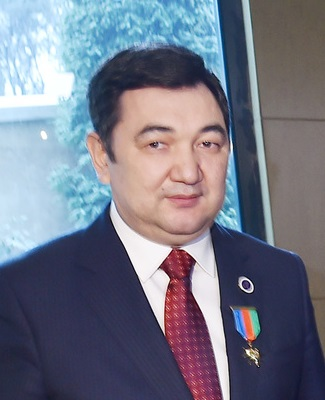
- Born: April 16, 1974 (age 52); Tulkibas District, South Kazakhstan Region, Kazakhstan
- Education: Al-Farabi Kazakh National University (1991–1992); Marmara University (1992–1996); Dokuz Eylül University (1996–1997); Ege University (1997–1998); Istanbul University (1998–2001)
- Title: Minister of information and social development of Kazakhstan (2 September, 2022); President of the International Turkic Academy (2014–2022); Chairman of the board of the Egemen Kazakhstan national newspaper
- Awards: National Youth Award "Daryn"; Officer's Cross of the Order of the Republic of Hungary; “Dostlug” Order of Azerbaijan Republic
- Scientific career
- Fields: Turkic studies, Kazakh history
- Workplaces: President of the International Turkic Academy; Chairman of the board of the Egemen Kazakhstan national newspaper.

Darkhan Kydyrali (Kazakh: Дархан Қыдырәлі; born April 16, 1974) is a Kazakh scholar and writer, Doctor of Historical Sciences, professor. He is an academician of National Academy of Science Republic of Kazakhstan. From 2014 to August 31, 2022 Dr. Kydyrali President of the International Turkic Academy. Since July 2016 he has been working as chairman of the board of the Egemen Kazakhstan national newspaper. He is a member of political bureau council of Nur Otan party. He has a first council diplomatic rank. On September 2, 2022, Darkhan Kydyrali was appointed Minister of information and social development of Kazakhstan.

== Biography ==
Darkhan Kydyrali, born on April 16, 1974, in the Tulkibas district of the South Kazakhstan Region. He had studied at Al-Farabi Kazakh National University (Kazakhstan, 1991–1992), Marmara University (Turkey, 1992–1996), Dokuz Eylül University (Turkey, 1996–1997), Ege University (Turkey, 1997–1998), Istanbul University (Turkey, 1998–2001). He is a Corresponding Member of the Kazakhstan National Academy of Science (2017), Honorary Doctor of Azerbaijan National Academy of Sciences (2016), Honorary Doctor of Mongolian National Academy of Sciences (2017).

== Career ==
- 2001–2005 – Yassawi International Kazakh-Turkish University: research fellow, academic secretary, head of the department, chief of staff, senior research fellow
- 2003–2005 – senior research fellow of the Institute of Turkic Studies and "Bauyrzhantanu" Research Center
- 2005–2006 – associate professor, a senior research fellow at the Lev Gumilev Eurasian National University.
- 2006–2007 – deputy director of the Presidential Center of Culture of the Republic of Kazakhstan
- 2007–2008 – counsellor of the Minister of Education and Science of the Republic of Kazakhstan
- 2008–2009 – expert, head of sector at the Presidential Administration of Kazakhstan
- 2009–2012 – deputy press secretary of the President of the Republic of Kazakhstan
- 2012 - elected as the member of the executive board of the Union of writers of Kazakhstan
- 2012–2014 – deputy secretary-general of the Turkic Council
- 2014–2022 - president of the International Turkic Academy
- 2015–present - head of The Union of National Academies of Sciences of the Turkic World. Scientific projects organized under the direction of Darkhan Kydyrali: International cultural event "Korkyt Ata Heritage and the Turkic world" at the UNESCO headquarters in Paris (2015); International symposium "Synergy on the Silk Road and the Plan of 2030" at the UN headquarters in New York.
- July 2016–present - chairman of the board of the "Egemen Kazakhstan" national newspaper
- From September 2018 to August 31, 2022, he was appointed President of the International Turkic Academy for a second term
- September 2022 – Minister of information and social development of Kazakhstan
- September 2023 – Deputy of the Senate of the Parliament of Kazakhstan, took the oath and joined the Committee on International Relations, Defense and Security.

== Works ==
- Mustafa Shokai. Ankara, 2001
- Taraz tarihy. Taraz, 2005
- Turyk halyktary adebiety tarihy. (collective volume) Turkestan, 2005
- Mustafa Shokai. Astana, 2007
- Ulyk Turkestan. Astana, 2008
- Atymdy adam koigan son ... Astana, 2008
- Zheruiyk. Аstana, 2009
- Mustafa. Аstana, 2012

== Awards ==
- Recipient of the "Daryn" youth award (1998)
- Recipient of the Certificate of gratitude from the President of Kazakhstan and medals
- Laureate of the "Kultegin" award for high achievements in Turkic studies (2014)
- Recipient of the "For service to Turkic world" prize (2015)
- Recipient of the gold medal "For service to Turkic history and culture" awarded by the "New Turkey" Strategic Institute (2015)
- Laureate of the "Red Apple" award (2015)
- Recipient of the "20th anniversary of the Kazakhstan People Assembly" (2015) medal
- The Prize for outstanding service for the Turkic world (2016)
- An International Award "For service to the Turkic World" presented by the Silk Road Strategy research center and The Silk Road Magazine (2017)
- Hungarian Order of Merit (2017)
- Dostlug Order of Azerbaijan Republic (2017)
- Order of Parasat (2018)
- The Award pin "Aqparat Salasynyn Uzdigi" ("The Information Worker")

== Additional links ==
- Scientific Integration of the Turkic World, Interview to the "Mysl'" (Thought) Magazine, December 23, 2014 (in Russian).
- At the Heart of the “Greater Eurasia”, Interview to the "Kaspiy" (Caspian) Analytical Portal of Azerbaijan (in Russian).
- Abay: The Leader of the Modernization Period in Turkestan, "Kardes Kalemler" (Brotherly Pens) International Magazine (in Turkish)
