= Yuri Ilyin =

Kazakhstani politician (born 1968)

- Юрий Ильин
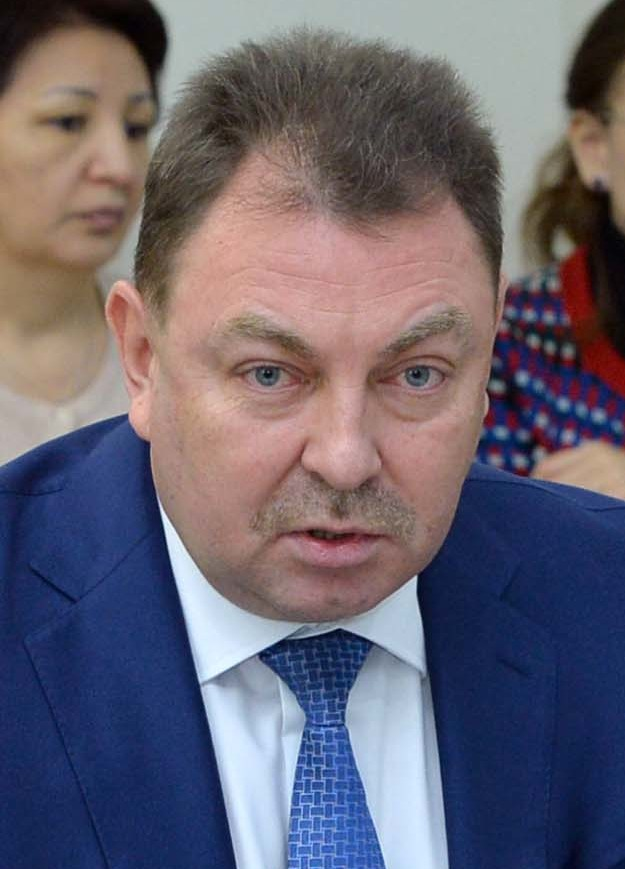
- Ilyin in 2020

Minister of Emergency Situations
- In office 11 September 2020 – 10 June 2023
- President: Kassym-Jomart Tokayev
- Prime Minister: Askar Mamin; Älihan Smaiylov
- Preceded by: Vladimir Bozhko (2014)
- Succeeded by: Syrym Sharipkhanov

Personal details
- Born: 9 April 1968 (age 58) Kuybyshev, Russian SFSR, Soviet Union
- Children: 3
- Education: Alma-Ata Higher Combined Arms Command School; Kyrgyz State Law University

Military service
- Allegiance: Soviet Union (1989–1991); Russia (1991–1992); Kazakhstan (2020–present)
- Branch/service: Armed Forces of Kazakhstan
- Years of service: 2020–present
- Rank: Lieutenant General

Yuriy Viktorovich Ilyin (Russian: Юрий Викторович Ильин, IPA: [ˈjʉrʲɪj ˈvʲiktərəvʲɪtɕ ɪˈlʲjin]; born 9 April 1968) is a Kazakhstani politician and Lieutenant General who has served as Minister of Emergency Situations from 11 September 2020 to 10 June 2023.

== Early life and education ==
Ilyin was born in the town of Kuybyshev in present-day Russia. In 1989, he graduated from the Alma-Ata Higher Combined Arms Command School with a specialty in engineering for the operation of tracked and wheeled vehicles. He eventually attended the Kyrgyz State Law University where he earned a degree in law in 2006.

== Career ==
In August 1989, Ilyin became the commander of a motorized rifle platoon of the 73rd Guards Motorized Rifle Regiment of the 2nd Guards Motorized Rifle Division of the Moscow Military District and from April 1990, he was the commander of the 1st Guards Motorized Rifle Regiment. In July 1992, Ilyin became a teacher of 390 courses of Civil Defense in the Sumy Oblast of Ukraine before becoming the deputy head of the courses in July 1993.

From August 1996, Ilyin was a senior officer of the training center of the Almaty Regional Department for Emergency Situations. In June 1998, he became the Head of the Civil Protection Department of the Almaty City Emergency Management and served the post before becoming the Deputy Head of the Almaty City Department for Emergency Situations in June 1999. In March 2005, Ilyin became the Deputy Head of the Department for Emergency Situations of Almaty, and from December 2011, he was the Acting Head of the Department for Mobilization Preparation, Civil Defense, Organization of Prevention and Elimination of Accidents and Natural Disasters of Almaty before being appointed as the Head in January 2012.

== High level positions ==
In March 2013, Ilyin became the Deputy Äkim of Almaty. He served the post until becoming the State Inspector of the Department of State Control and Organizational and Territorial Work of the Presidential Administration of Kazakhstan on 21 October 2015.

On 8 April 2016, he was appointed as a Deputy Minister of Internal Affairs. While serving the post, Ilyin was awarded the rank of major general on 6 May 2020. On 11 September 2020, he was appointed as a Minister of Emergency Situations.

On 10 June 2023, President Tokayev dismissed Ilyin amid large-scale wildfires in the Abai Region.
