= Erulan Jamaubaev =

Kazakh politician

- Ерұлан Жамаубаев
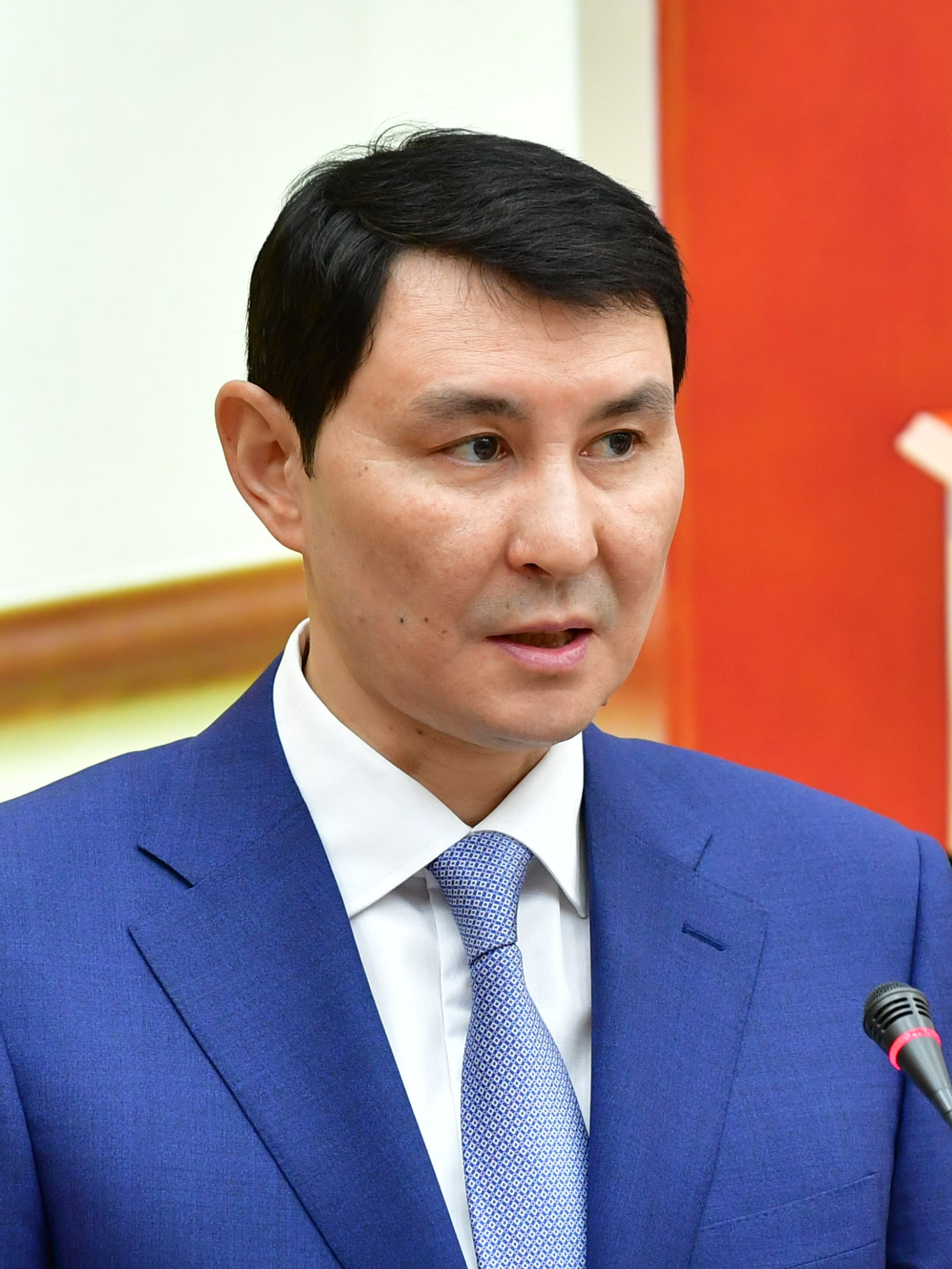
- Erulan Jamaubaev, 2023

First Deputy Chairman of the National Bank of Kazakhstan
- Incumbent
- Assumed office 17 February 2025
- President: Kassym-Jomart Tokayev
- Chairman: Timur Suleimenov
- Preceded by: office established

Deputy Prime Minister
- In office 29 March 2022 – 6 February 2024
- President: Kassym-Jomart Tokayev
- Prime Minister: Älihan Smaiylov

Minister of Finance
- In office 18 May 2020 – 6 February 2024
- President: Kassym-Jomart Tokayev
- Prime Minister: Asqar Mamin; Älihan Smaiylov
- Preceded by: Älihan Smaiylov
- Succeeded by: Mädi Takiev

Personal details
- Born: 25 March 1974 (age 52) Almaty Region, Kazakh SSR, Soviet Union
- Children: 3
- Education: Narxoz University

Erūlan Kenjebekūly Jamaubaev (Note: Often transliterated as Yerulan Kenzhebekuly Zhamaubayev through the Russified Romanization of Russian: Ерулан Кенжебекулы Жамаубаев) (Kazakh: Ерұлан Кенжебекұлы Жамаубаев; born 25 March 1974) is a Kazakh politician who has served as First Deputy Chairman of the National Bank of Kazakhstan since 2025. He served as the Minister of Finance from 2020 to 2024. Jamaubaev additionally served as the Deputy Prime Minister from 2022 to 2024.

== Biography ==
=== Early life and education ===
Jamaubaev was born in the Almaty Region of Kazakh SSR in 1974. He graduated from Narxoz University in 1995 and worked as a teacher-trainee and teacher thereafter. In 2009, Jamaubaev earned a Master of Business Administration degree with a specialisation in Strategic Management.

=== Career ===
From 1998 to 2006, Jamaubaev was a Leading Analyst, Chief Analyst, Chief Analyst Specialist, Head of department, deputy director of the Research and Statistics Department of the National Bank of Kazakhstan. In 2006, he became the director of the Department of the bank until he was appointed as managing director of JSC Housing Construction Savings Bank of Kazakhstan in 2014.

From July 2015, Jamaubaev was the Deputy Head of the Department of Socio-Economic Monitoring of the Administration of the President of the Republic of Kazakhstan until being appointed as the Head of the Department of Socio-Economic Monitoring of the Presidential Administration of Kazakhstan on 2 November 2015.

On 29 November 2018, he was appointed as assistant to the President of Kazakhstan. He was later relieved of this position and went on to become the Executive Secretary of the Ministry of Finance on 22 March 2019.

From 18 May 2020 to 6 February 2024, he was served as Minister of Finance under Mamin's cabinet.

Additionally, he has been the Chairman of the Board of Directors of Damu Entrepreneurship Development Fund JSC since 4 May 2022.

On 17 February 2025 by decree of President Tokayev, he was appointed to the newly created position, First Deputy Chairman of the National Bank.
