= Ministry of Information and Social Development =

Government ministry of Kazakhstan

Ministry of Information and Social Development of the Republic of Kazakhstan
- Қазақстан Республикасы Ақпарат және қоғамдық даму министрлігі (Kazakh); Министерство информации и общественного развития Республики Казахстан (Russian)
- Emblem of Kazakhstan

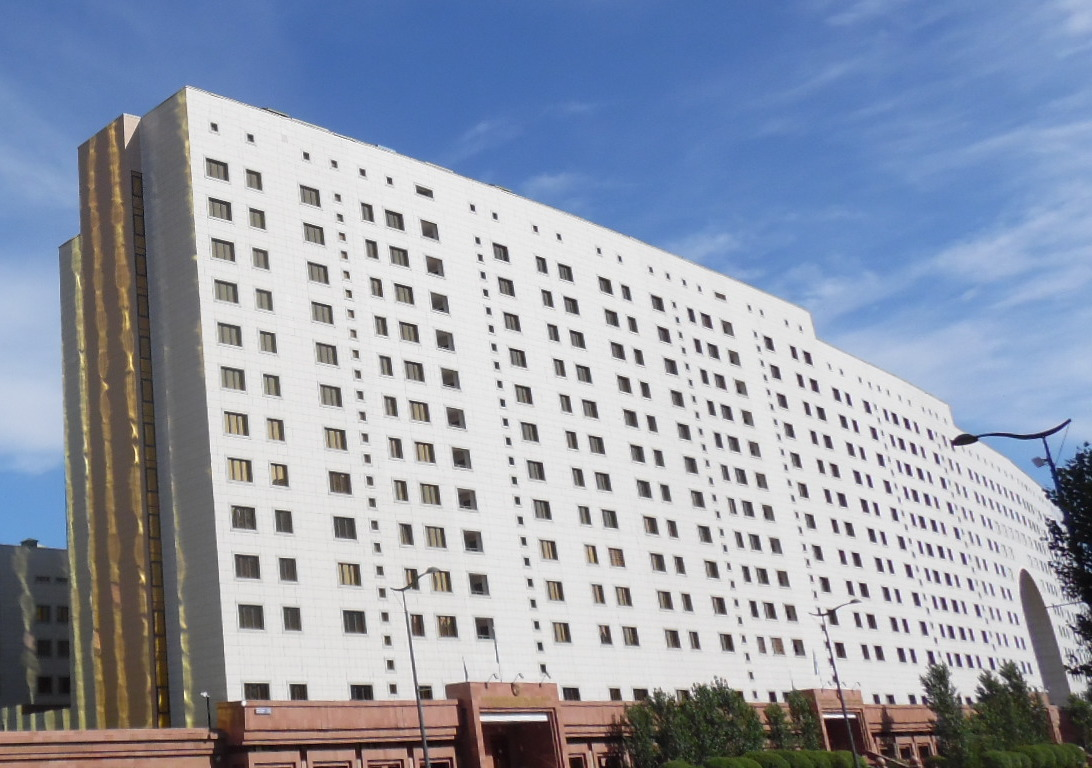
- House of Ministries

Agency overview
- Formed: 13 September 2016
- Jurisdiction: Government of Kazakhstan
- Headquarters: Astana, Kazakhstan
- Agency executive: Darkhan Kydyrali, Minister

The Ministry of Information and Social Development of the Republic of Kazakhstan (MISD RK, Kazakh: Қазақстан Республикасы Ақпарат және қоғамдық даму министрлігі, romanized: Qazaqstan Respublikasy Aqparat jäne qoğamdyq damu ministrlıgı, ҚР АҚДМ; Russian: Министерство информации и общественного развития Республики Казахстан, МИОР РК) is a central executive body of the Government of Kazakhstan. It was formed by a presidential decree on 13 September 2016 as the Ministry of Social Development. The Ministry is responsible for interaction with religious associations, ensuring the rights of citizens to freedom of religion, interaction between the state and the civil sector, and youth policy.

== History ==
Earlier in the Republic of Kazakhstan in the field of interaction with religious associations, the authority was carried out by the Committee on Religious Affairs under the Ministry of Culture and Sports of Kazakhstan, in the field of interaction with non-governmental organizations — two relevant management of the Ministry of Culture and Sports — Management on cooperation with NGOs and the Office for the coordination of the work of state bodies in the field of cooperation with NGOs, which are members of the Committee on the Development of Languages and Public and Political Work. In the field of youth policy — the Department of Youth Policy Department of the Ministry of Education and Science, and earlier the Committee on Youth Affairs.

The authority regarding interaction with religious associations was exercised by the Committee on Religious Affairs under the Ministry of Culture and Sports.

On 25 February 2019, by a decree of the President of Kazakhstan Nursultan Nazarbayev, the Ministry of Social Development of the Republic of Kazakhstan was reorganized into the Ministry of Information and Social Development with the transfer of functions and powers in the field of information from the Ministry of Information and Communications.

On April 29, 2019, the official presentation of the Unified Volunteer Information Platform "QazVolunteer.kz" in the central communications service. The project was developed by the Ministry of Information and Public Development of Kazakhstan together with the "National Volunteer Network" with the support of the Grant "Civil Initiatives Support Center".
