= Ministry of Industry and Infrastructure Development =

Government ministry of Kazakhstan

Ministry of Industry and Infrastructure Development of the Republic of Kazakhstan
- Қазақстан Республикасы Индустрия және инфрақұрылымдық даму министрлігі (Kazakh); Министерство индустрии и инфраструктурного развития Республики Казахстан (Russian)
- Emblem of Kazakhstan

- Office building of the Ministry of Industry and Infrastructure Development

Agency overview
- Formed: 28 August 2002
- Preceding agency: Ministry of Transport and Communications
- Jurisdiction: Government of Kazakhstan
- Headquarters: Astana, Kazakhstan
- Agency executives: Marat Qarabayev, Minister; Almaz Idyrysov, First Vice Minister
- Website: Official website

The Ministry of Industry and Infrastructure Development of the Republic of Kazakhstan (MIID RK, Kazakh: Қазақстан Республикасы Индустрия және инфрақұрылымдық даму министрлігі, romanized: Qazaqstan Respublikasy İndustriia jäne infraqūrylymdyq damu ministrlıgı, ҚР ИИД; Russian: Министерство индустрии и инфраструктурного развития Республики Казахстан, romanized: Ministerstvo industrii i infrastrukturnogo razvitiya Respubliki Kazakhstan, МИИР РК) is a central executive body of the Government of Kazakhstan that provides policies in the fields of industry and industrial, innovative, scientific and technical development of the country.

== History ==
The Ministry was originally established as the Ministry of Industry and Trade on 28 August 2002, after its powers were transferred from the Ministry of Economy and Budget Planning.

On 12 March 2010, it was turned into Ministry of Industry and New Technologies to oversee the non-oil sector with its functions in the field of electric power, mining and nuclear industry from the Ministry of Energy and Mineral Resources.

On 6 August 2014, the functions from the Ministry of Transport and Communications, the National Space Agency, the Communications and Information Agency were transferred to the Ministry of Investment and Development.

The Ministry was reorganized into Ministry of Industry and Infrastructure Development on 26 December 2018 after its functions were transferred to the Ministry of National Economy and the Ministry of Internal Affairs.
