= Älihan Smaiylov =

Kazakh politician (born 1972)

- Әлихан Смайылов
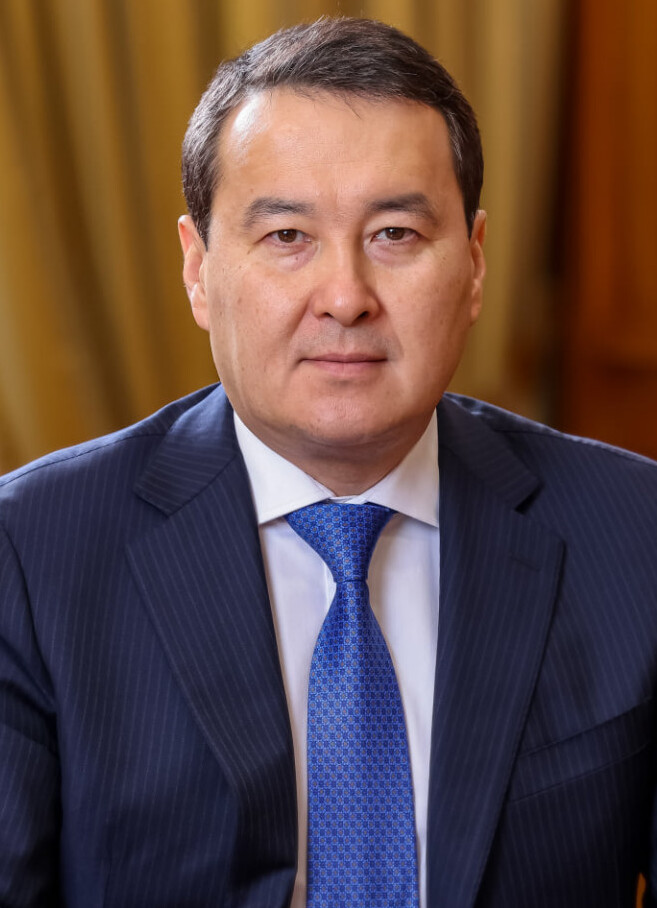
- Official portrait, 2022

Chairman of the Supreme Audit Chamber
- Incumbent
- Assumed office 1 April 2024
- President: Kassym-Jomart Tokayev
- Preceded by: Natalia Godunova

Prime Minister of Kazakhstan
- In office 11 January 2022 – 5 February 2024; Acting: 5–11 January 2022
- President: Kassym-Jomart Tokayev
- First Deputy: Roman Sklyar
- Preceded by: Asqar Mamin
- Succeeded by: Roman Sklyar (acting); Oljas Bektenov

First deputy prime minister
- In office 25 February 2019 – 5 January 2022
- Prime Minister: Asqar Mamin
- Preceded by: Asqar Mamin
- Succeeded by: Roman Sklyar

Minister of Finance
- In office 18 September 2018 – 18 May 2020
- President: Nursultan Nazarbayev
- Prime Minister: Bakhytzhan Sagintayev
- Preceded by: Bakhyt Sultanov
- Succeeded by: Erulan Jamaubaev

Assistant to the president
- In office 11 December 2015 – 18 September 2018
- President: Nursultan Nazarbayev
- Succeeded by: Timur Jaqsylyqov

Chairman of the Statistics Committee
- In office 6 August 2014 – 11 December 2015
- Preceded by: As the chairman of the Statistics Agency himself
- Succeeded by: Baqytbek Imanäliev (acting); Nurbolat Aidapkelov

Chairman of the Statistics Agency
- In office 27 October 2009 – 6 August 2014
- Preceded by: Anar Meşimbaeva
- Succeeded by: As the chairman of the Statistics Committee of the Ministry of National Economy himself
- In office November 1999 – February 2003
- Preceded by: Zhaksybek Kulekeyev
- Succeeded by: Qali Äbdiev

Personal details
- Born: 18 December 1972 (age 53) Alma-Ata, Kazakh SSR, Soviet Union
- Party: Amanat
- Spouse: Baljan Smaiylova
- Children: 2
- Education: Al-Farabi Kazakh National University; KIMEP University

Älihan Ashanūly Smaiylov (Note: Kazakh: Әлихан Асханұлы Смайылов, [æliˈχɑn ɑsˌχɑnʊˈɫə ˈsmɑjə̆ɫəf]; Russian: Алихан Асханович Смаилов, romanized: Alikhan Askhanovich Smailov; English: /ˌæliˈhɑːn ˈsmaɪlɒf/ AL-ee-HAHN SMY-lof) (born 18 December 1972) is a Kazakh politician serving as chairman of the Supreme Audit Chamber. He previously served as prime minister from 2022 to 2024 and finance minister from 2018 to 2020.

Previously, he served as the First Deputy Prime Minister of Kazakhstan under PM Asqar Mamin. He at the same time served as the Minister of Finance from 2018 to 2020. Smaiylov was appointed as the acting prime minister of Kazakhstan by President Kassym-Jomart Tokayev during the January Events. His candidacy was unanimously approved by the country's parliament.

Since January 2023, he has been Chairman of the Board of Directors of the JSC National Welfare Fund Samruk-Kazyna and since April 2024, he is the Chairman of the Supreme Audit Chamber of Kazakhstan.

== Biography ==
=== Early life and education ===
Smaiylov was born in the city of Alma-Ata (now Almaty) in the Kazakh SSR. In 1994, he graduated from the Al-Farabi Kazakh National University with a degree in applied mathematics and then in 1996, from the KIMEP University where he earned master's degree in public administration.

=== Career ===
In 1993, he became an employee of the A-Invest Investment and Privatization Fund. From 1995, Smaiylov was the chief specialist of the Trade and Industry Department of the Almaty City Administration. In 1996, he served as the trainee of the Supreme Economic Council under the President of Kazakhstan. From August 1996 to February 1998, Smaiylov was the deputy head and then the head of Department of the National Statistical Agency of Kazakhstan.

In 1998, he was the deputy chairman of the Committee on Statistics and Analysis of the Agency for Statistical Planning and Reforms of Kazakhstan. From 1998 to 1999, Smaiylov served as the chief expert, head of the sector of the department, state inspector of the Presidential Administration of Kazakhstan. From August to November 1999, Smaiylov was the state inspector of the Organizational and Control Department of the Presidential Administration. That same year, he became the chairman of the Agency of Kazakhstan on Statistics.

In 2003, Smaiylov was appointed as the Vice Minister of Foreign Affairs until he became the chairman of the Board of the Joint Stock Company State Insurance Company for Insurance of Export Credits and Investments. In February 2006, he was appointed as the Vice Minister of Finance until January 2007, when he became the president of JSC National Holding Kazagro. On 21 November 2008, Smaiylov was reappointed as the Vice Minister of Finance. From 27 October 2009, Smaiylov served the chairman of the Agency of Kazakhstan on Statistics again until August 2014, when he became the chairman of the Committee on Statistics.

On 11 December 2015, Smaiylov was appointed as the Assistant to the President of Kazakhstan, Nursultan Nazarbayev. He served that position until 18 September 2018, when he became the Minister of Finance under Prime Minister Bakhytjan Sagintayev.

On 25 February 2019, he became the First Deputy Prime Minister of Kazakhstan in Mamin Government. At the same time, Smaiylov served as the Minister of Finance until 18 May 2020, when he was replaced by Erulan Jamaubaev. From 27 May 2020, Smaiylov is the representative of Kazakhstan in the Eurasian Economic Commission.

On 19 January 2023, Älihan Smailov was elected Chairman of the Board of Directors of National Welfare Fund Samruk-Kazyna.

== Prime Minister of Kazakhstan (2022–2024) ==
=== Tenure ===
Following the outbreak of 2022 Kazakh unrest, President Kassym-Jomart Tokayev appointed Smaiylov as the acting prime minister of Kazakhstan on 5 January 2022, in response to the resignation of his predecessor Asqar Mamin and his government. According to Joanna Lillis from Eurasianet, Smaiylov along with other ministers is a technocrat with role in "carrying the baggage" of a "tainted cabinet" and that his appointment as the head of government would provide more clues in Tokayev's future policies.

==== First term ====
On 11 January 2022, the Mäjilis, the lower house of the Parliament of Kazakhstan, approved Smaiylov as the new prime minister with 89 deputies across party factions unanimously voting in favour for his candidacy. President Tokayev at the session asserted that Smaiylov's view on Kazakhstan's future economy being "correct" and that he had "a precise plan". From there, Smaiylov himself thanked for support and remarked it as a "great responsibility" and praised Tokayev's existing policies. With 9 out of 20 total ministers being new appointees, the First Smaiylov Government faced tasks in improving the quality of life for citizens, maintaining economic growth, dealing with the ongoing COVID-19 pandemic, restoring the widescale damage and leading Kazakhstan out of the aftermath caused by the unrest.

At the first meeting with cabinet of ministers on 12 January 2022, Smaiylov proclaimed that the government "must justify the high confidence of the head of state at this difficult moment for the whole country."

==== Second term ====
In response to the 2023 Kazakhstan wildfires, Smaiylov urged faster implementation of early fire detection systems in Kazakh natural parks, citing Burabay National Park's success in reducing fire damage and response times, and instructed measures to equip all national parks and forests with these systems and revise wildfire response protocols. On 31 July 2023, Smaiylov signed a resolution to allocate an additional 918 million tenge from the government reserve for purchasing fire-fighting overalls for employees of forest fire stations working in environmental institutions and forestries.

On 5 February 2024, Smaiylov and his cabinet resigned. He was replaced by his deputy and acting Prime Minister, Roman Sklyar. The next day, the official new Prime Minister, Oljas Bektenov was appointed.

=== Domestic policy ===
==== COVID-19 response ====
Amid rising COVID-19 cases in several regions of Kazakhstan, Smaiylov on 12 January 2022 instructed the Ministry of Healthcare and local executive bodies to increase PCR testing, monitor operations, ensure medical readiness, and prevent drug shortages, emphasizing the need for mobile medical teams to provide home care and free medicines, while also significantly increasing the rate of population revaccination under the personal control of regional akims.

=== Socioeconomic policies ===
On 18 January 2022, the government approved the Plan of Operational Actions to Stabilize the Socio-Economic Situation following the January Events. The action plan included 51 measures to restore public order, rebuild infrastructure, support social issues, prevent price hikes, and aid businesses. Key actions involve increasing security, compensating affected workers, and supporting the families of victims. Measures also include debt relief, housing aid, stabilizing the foreign exchange market, and delaying tax inspections. Smaiylov emphasized the plan's focus on increasing citizens' incomes and reducing youth unemployment, with strict oversight by state officials to ensure effective implementation.

In March 2022, the Program to Increase Incomes of the Population until 2025 was adopted, aimed at improving citizens' well-being and updating social and labour policies by boosting employment in industry and entrepreneurship through the creation of new industrial clusters, financial support for small and medium-sized businesses (SMEs), and fostering SME development around large enterprises; in the agricultural sector, it includes measures to establish households, implement investment projects, and expand microcredit mechanisms, with the overall goal of reducing the share of the population earning below the subsistence level, reducing unemployment, and creating about 2 million new jobs by 2025.

==== State regulation of prices ====
Under President Tokayev's initiative, Smaiylov instructed the adoption of a regulatory act on 5 January 2022, to implement price caps on liquefied gas, gasoline, and diesel for 180 days, along with a mechanism for state regulation of prices for socially significant food products, which the price cap for petroleum products was extended until January 2023. Following this, in June 2023, legislation was adopted to continue regulating state pricing for liquefied gas, emphasizing transparent pricing mechanisms and fair market practices in Kazakhstan.

==== Inflation reduction ====
Facing an 8.1% inflation rate, Smaiylov instructed government bodies to take measures to increase food production, control trade markups, monitor pricing practices, and ensure market saturation. A draft set of measures to control and reduce inflation for 2022–2024 has been developed was adopted in February 2022, which included 66 measures across five areas to boost production, improve logistics, regulate pricing, and enforce antimonopoly and foreign trade regulations.

Following the Russian invasion of Ukraine, Kazakhstan's inflation rate suddenly spiked. Smaiylov attributed the cause to rising global food prices and urged state bodies and regional akims to strengthen efforts to curb inflation and take effective measures.

== Notes ==
Political offices
Preceded by Bakhyt Sultanov	Minister of Finance; 2018–2020	Succeeded by Erulan Jamaubaev
Preceded by Askar Mamin	First Deputy Prime Minister of Kazakhstan; 2019–2022	Succeeded by Roman Sklyar
Preceded by Askar Mamin	Prime Minister of Kazakhstan; 2022–2024	Succeeded by Oljas Bektenov
