= Erjan Sädenov =

- Ержан Сәденов
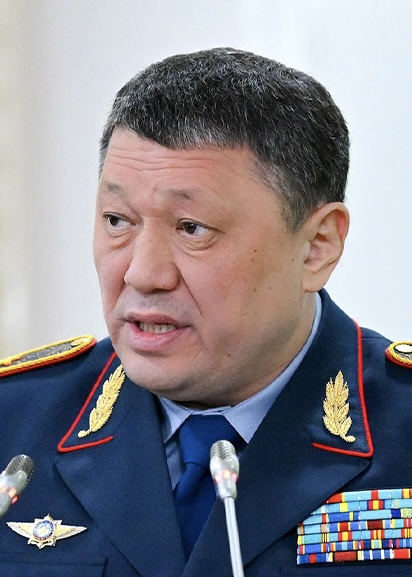
- Sädenov in 2026

Minister of Internal Affairs
- Incumbent
- Assumed office 2 September 2023
- President: Kassym-Jomart Tokayev
- Prime Minister: Älihan Smaiylov; Oljas Bektenov
- Preceded by: Marat Ahmetjanov

Deputy Minister of Internal Affairs
- In office 26 January 2022 – 2 September 2023
- Prime Minister: Älihan Smaiylov
- Minister: Marat Ahmetjanov

Head of the Nur-Sultan City Police Department
- In office 24 April 2019 – 26 January 2022
- Äkim: Bakhyt Sultanov; Altai Kölgınov

Head of the Akmola Regional Police Department
- In office June 2016 – April 2019
- Äkim: Sergey Kulagin; Malik Myrzalin; Ermek Marjyqpaev

Personal details
- Born: October 24, 1968 (age 57) Quigan village, Kurshim District, East Kazakhstan Region, Kazakh SSR, Soviet Union
- Education: Sarsen Amanzholov East Kazakhstan State University; Karaganda NSC Higher School
- Website: Ministry of Internal Affairs Official website

Military service
- Rank: Lieutenant general of the Police (2023)

Erjan Saparbekūly Sädenov (Kazakh: Ержан Сапарбекұлы Сәденов, [jerˈʐɑn sɑpʰɑrˈbʲekʰo̙ɫɯ sædʲenɘf]; born 24 October 1968) is a Kazakh politician and former police officer, who's currently serving as the Minister of Internal Affairs since September 2023.

Before his tenure as Minister, Sädenov served as the Deputy Minister of Internal Affairs from January 2022, and, before that, as Head of the Astana City Police Department from April 2019.

== Early life and education ==
Sädenov was born on 24 October 1968 in the Kurshim District of the East Kazakhstan Region.

In 1993, Sädenov finished his studies in the Sarsen Amanzholov East Kazakhstan State University. In 1998, he finished the Karaganda Higher School of the National Security Committee.

== Law enforcement career ==
Sädenov started his career in 1993 as the operative representative of the interdistrict investigative department of the Department of Internal Affairs of the East Kazakhstan Region. In 1994, he completed his service there and was appointed as a senior operational representative of the investigative department of the Ministry of Internal Affairs of the Region.

In the years 1995–1996, Sädenov was the head of the anti-car theft and anti-kidnapping unit of the Öskemen Internal Affairs Department, and from January 1, 1996, to March 19, 1996, he was the head of the property and drug addiction crime detection unit of the city's Criminal Investigation Department.

From 1996 to 1997, he was the deputy head of the State Investigative Committee for the city of Serebryansk, and from 1997 to 1998 he headed the investigation department of the Department of Investigation of Crimes Against Individuals of the Internal Affairs Ministry of the East Kazakhstan Region.

From February 1998 to 1 July 1998, he held other various minor Ministry positions. From 2000 to 2004, he was the head of the Zaisan District police station of the Ministry of Internal Affairs of the Region, then, until 2006 he headed the police station of the Tarbagatay District of the Ministry of Internal Affairs of the Region until 2006.

From 2006 to 2008, Sädenov worked as the head of the anti-narcotics department of the DIA of the East Kazakhstan Region, and in 2008–2009, he was the head of the Ridder city Department of Internal Affairs. From 5 May to 22 August 2009, he was the head of the Oskemen Internal Affairs Department of the EKR DIA, and from 2009 to 2013, he served as the first deputy head of the DIA of Mangystau Region.

From there, he went on to hold various positions in the Ministry and in June 2016, he was appointed as the Head of the Akmola Regional Police Department. He served in this position until April 2019.

On 24 April 2019, Sädenov was appointed to the position of head of the Police Department of Nur-Sultan (now Astana). Sädenov was introduced to the staff of the Police Department by the Minister of Internal Affairs Erlan Turgymbaev and the Äkim of the city, Bakhyt Sultanov. He continued his service there until January 26, 2022.

== Political career ==
On 26 January 2022, by the order of President Tokayev, Sädenov was appointed a deputy to then-Minister of Internal Affairs of Kazakhstan Marat Ahmetjanov, and for that reason was dismissed from the position of chief policeman of Astana.

On 2 September 2023, after Ahmetjanov's resignation as minister, Sädenov was appointed as his successor. On February 6, 2024, after the resignation of the Smaiylov Cabinet, Sädenov was reappointed to his position as member of the current Bektenov Government.

== Awards and honours ==
Sädenov's awards and decorations include:

- Medal "for 20 years of Kazakhstan's independence" (2011);
- Certificate of Honour of the Republic of Kazakhstan (2013);
- Medal "for 20 years to Kazakhstan's Constitution" (2015);
- Medal "for 25 years of Kazakhstan's independence" (2016);
- Weapon of honour, registered firearm of employees of the Ministry of Internal Affairs (2017);
- Order of Valour, 2nd class (2018).
