= Illegal drug trade in Kazakhstan =

The illegal drug trade in Kazakhstan primarily involves the transit of illicit narcotics, particularly Afghan opiates, through the country's territory towards markets in the Russian Federation and Europe. Due to its strategic geographic location and expansive borders, Kazakhstan is a critical node along the "Northern Route" of global heroin trafficking. In addition to serving as a transit hub, the country is a source of large-scale wild cannabis growth, predominantly in the Chu Valley, and has increasingly become a market for synthetic drugs.

== The "Northern Route" ==
Kazakhstan is a major transit state for opioids produced in Afghanistan. According to reports by the United Nations Office on Drugs and Crime (UNODC), the global illicit heroin market relies heavily on two main corridors: the Balkan route and the Northern route. The Northern route runs from Afghanistan through neighboring Central Asian republics—such as Tajikistan and Kyrgyzstan (or Uzbekistan / Turkmenistan)—into Kazakhstan, before crossing the 7,500-kilometer border into Russia and onward to Europe. The UNODC estimates the market value of the Northern route to be approximately $13 billion annually.

Within this vast network, the UNODC identifies southern Kazakhstan, particularly the city of Shymkent and the surrounding Turkestan Region, as a paramount strategic gateway for drug trafficking. Located just 120 kilometers from Tashkent, Uzbekistan, and in immediate proximity to key border checkpoints such as Zhibek Zholy (Saryagash), Shymkent acts as the primary entry point where colossal volumes of Afghan opiates first penetrate Kazakh territory. International reports specifically highlight the "Samarkand — Tashkent — Shymkent" highway as one of the most heavily exploited drug arteries in Central Asia.

The region's high vulnerability to trafficking is largely due to the massive volume of licit cross-border trade. Trafficking organizations heavily exploit the intense daily flow of commercial transport and the deep socio-economic ties of the local diaspora with neighboring Uzbekistan to camouflage their operations. Illicit narcotics are frequently smuggled in heavy cargo trucks and scheduled passenger buses, meticulously hidden inside specially constructed compartments or disguised among legal agricultural and commercial goods, such as watermelons, onions, dried fruits, textiles, and building materials.

Upon successfully breaching the Uzbek-Kazakh border, Shymkent functions as a sophisticated consolidation and distribution hub. Here, large multi-ton shipments are typically broken down, repackaged, and diverted along four distinct internal corridors towards the Russian Federation:

- Northwestward: Towards Aktobe and Uralsk, feeding directly into the Russian Volga region and the Southern Urals.
- Northward: Through Karaganda and the capital city of Astana, heading towards northern Kazakh transit cities like Kostanay and Petropavl, and eventually into Siberia.
- Eastward: Towards Almaty, serving both the local consumer market and facilitating onward trafficking to eastern Russia.
- Northeastward: Through Taraz (Zhambyl Region) and proceeding towards the borders of China or eastern Russia.

Because of this intense concentration of trafficking activity, Shymkent is recognized by international law enforcement as a critical chokepoint. The region is frequently the focus of major regional anti-narcotic operations (such as "Channel - Red Barkhan") and UNODC-led border control initiatives aimed at intercepting high-risk cargo.

Recent UNODC overviews have also noted a severe transformation in the structure of the regional drug market. While Shymkent has historically been a transit corridor for traditional Afghan opiates and hashish, there is a surging influx of synthetic drugs (such as Alpha-PVP and Mephedrone) as well as Afghan-produced crystal methamphetamine. The Shymkent agglomeration and the broader Turkestan Region have subsequently evolved from a mere transit zone into an active destination for chemical precursors and a hotbed for clandestine synthetic drug laboratories, which are increasingly being dismantled by local law enforcement.

While the Balkan route traditionally sees higher overall volumes, fluctuations in Afghan drug cultivation can heavily impact the Northern route. For example, UNODC data has previously shown that localized decreases in Afghan opium production temporarily shifted routes away from Kazakhstan, creating heroin shortages and price spikes. Traffickers continuously adapt by utilizing alternative crossings, including maritime trafficking across the Caspian Sea.

== Domestic production ==
While primarily a transit point, Kazakhstan possesses significant domestic drug production capabilities.

- Cannabis: The Chu Valley (also known as the Shu Valley), located in the Zhambyl Region in south-central Kazakhstan, is one of the world's largest areas of wild cannabis growth. The UNODC and local authorities estimate that approximately 138,000 hectares of wild cannabis grow in the region, which has the theoretical potential to yield up to 100,000 metric tons of marijuana or nearly 3,500 metric tons of hashish annually.
- Synthetic drugs and precursors: Kazakhstan is home to naturally growing Ephedra, a botanical precursor used for synthesizing ephedrine and methamphetamine. Over recent years, law enforcement has noted a proliferation of clandestine laboratories manufacturing synthetic drugs domestically.

== Domestic consumption ==
Historically, Kazakhstan served as a consumer market for Afghan heroin, which contributed to high rates of injection drug use and associated public health issues. However, the UNODC and Kazakh law enforcement agencies have noted a marked transition in consumer habits. The importation and domestic synthesis of synthetic drugs have surged, partially replacing traditional opiates. These synthetic substances are frequently distributed using modern, decentralized methods such as internet sales, anonymous messaging apps, banking payment systems, and mail services.

== Law enforcement and countermeasures ==
The Kazakh government actively cooperates with international organizations, including the UNODC, to strengthen border control, interdiction efforts, and public awareness. Kazakhstan hosts the Central Asian Regional Information and Coordination Centre (CARICC) in Almaty, an initiative strongly supported by the UNODC to facilitate regional intelligence sharing and operations against transnational drug trafficking.

The country routinely revises its border procedures, deploys canine detection units that seize hundreds of kilograms of narcotics annually, and conducts operations to identify maritime supply channels. Additionally, cross-border public awareness campaigns organized by the UNODC are regularly held at border crossing points to inform citizens, particularly youth, about the legal and health consequences of illicit drug trafficking.

== See also ==
- Crime in Kazakhstan
- Central Asian Regional Information and Coordination Centre (CARICC)
- Illegal drug trade
- United Nations Office on Drugs and Crime
