= Ermek Marjyqpaev =

Kazakh politician

- Ермек Маржықпаев
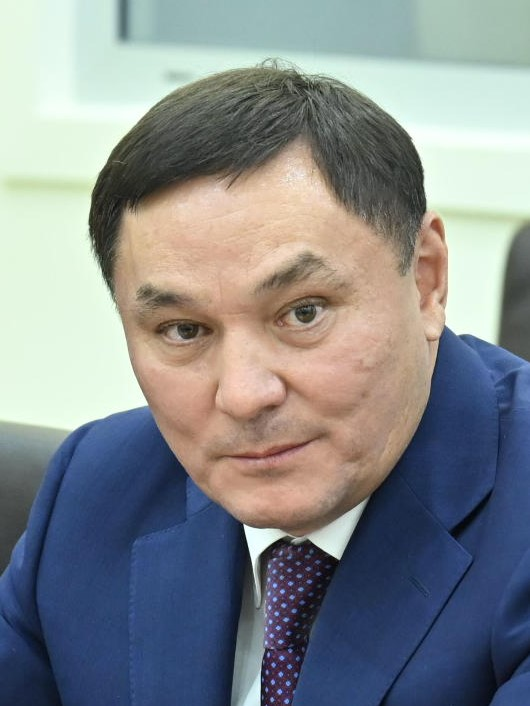
- Marjyqpaev in 2023

Minister of Tourism and Sports
- In office 2 September 2023 – 31 August 2024
- President: Kassym-Jomart Tokayev
- Prime Minister: Älihan Smaiylov; Roman Sklyar (acting); Oljas Bektenov
- Preceded by: Ministry reestablished; Talğat Ermegiaev (2012)
- Succeeded by: Erbol Myrzabosynov

Akim of Akmola Region
- In office 19 March 2019 – 2 September 2023
- Preceded by: Mälik Myrzalin
- Succeeded by: Marat Ahmetjanov

Akim of Kokshetau
- In office 6 January 2015 – 19 March 2019
- Preceded by: Jomart Nurğaliev
- Succeeded by: Amangeldi Smaiylov

Personal details
- Born: 29 August 1969 (age 57) Tselinograd, Kazakh SSR, Soviet Union
- Party: Amanat
- Children: 2
- Education: Tselinograd Pedagogical Institute; Turan University; Kokshetau State University
- Awards: Order of Parasat; Order of Kurmet; Medal for Distinguished Labor; Medal "10 Years of Independence of the Republic of Kazakhstan"; Medal "10 Years of the Constitution of the Republic of Kazakhstan"; Medal "10 Years of Astana"; Medal "20 Years of Independence of the Republic of Kazakhstan"; Medal "25 Years of Independence of the Republic of Kazakhstan"

Military service
- Allegiance: Soviet Union
- Branch/service: Soviet Armed Forces
- Years of service: 1988–1989

Ermek Boranbaiuly Marjyqpaev (Kazakh: Ермек Боранбайұлы Маржықпаев; born 29 August 1969) is a Kazakh politician who served as Minister of Tourism and Sports from 2023 to 2024. He previously was the akim of Akmola Region from 2019 to 2023 and akim of Kokshetau from 2015 to 2019. Since September 2024, Marjyqpaev has served as advisor to the prime minister of Kazakhstan.

== Biography ==
Marjyqpaev was born on 29 August 1969 in Tselinograd (now Astana). From 1988 to 1989, Marjyqpaev served in the Soviet Army. He graduated from the Tselinograd Pedagogical Institute in 1994 with a degree in history education, from Turan University in 2001 with a law degree, and from Kokshetau State University in 2009 with a bachelor's degree in finance. He received a PhD in 2016.

Marjyqpaev held the position of vice-president of the Akmola Boxing Federation and has the title of Master of Sports in boxing. From 1991 to 1993, he worked as a boxing coach in schools in Tselinograd and later studied at a secondary school in Burabay, Akmola Region.

From 1992 to 1995, he was director of the small business enterprise Shonai. From 1995 to 2008, he served as general director of Bereke-Burabay LLP.

Marjyqpaev began his political career as a deputy of the 4th convocation of the Akmola Regional Mäslihat from 2007 to 2009. In 2008, he was appointed akim of Arshaly District, serving until 2012. He subsequently served as akim of Zerenda District until 2013. From 2013 to 2014, Marjyqpaev worked as a deputy of the akim of Akmola Region, Qosman Aitmuhametov, for construction, housing and communal services and highways.

On 6 January 2015, he was appointed akim of Kokshetau, serving until 2019. On 19 March 2019, he was appointed akim of Akmola Region. During his tenure, at the meeting of the Akmola regional branch of the Amanat party, which took place in April 2022 and was attended by Marjyqpaev, it became known that 96% of the promises made in the party's election program were fulfilled with Marjyqpaev being instrumental in increasing this achievement.

On 2 September 2023, Marjyqpaev was appointed Minister of Tourism and Sports with the consent of the Mäjilis and by decree of President Kassym-Jomart Tokayev.

In April 2024, Marjyqpaev admitted that Kazakhstan's national team at the 2024 Summer Olympics was in a bad position.

On 31 August 2024, by Tokayev's decree, Marjyqpaev lost the post of Minister of Tourism and Sports.

== Criticism ==
As an akim of Akmola Region, Marjyqpaev allocated 10 million tenge for measures described as a "fight against trolls," which drew criticism for being an inefficient use of public funds.

== Awards ==
- Order of Parasat (2021)
- Order of Kurmet (2011)
- Medal for Distinguished Labor (2004)
- Honored Worker of Tourism of the Republic of Kazakhstan (2007)
- Master of Sports in Boxing
- Honored Coach of the Republic of Kazakhstan

State Anniversary Medals

- Medal "10 Years of Independence of the Republic of Kazakhstan" (2001)
- Medal "10 Years of the Constitution of the Republic of Kazakhstan" (2005)
- Medal "10 Years of Astana" (2008)
- Medal "20 Years of Independence of the Republic of Kazakhstan" (2011)
- Medal "25 Years of Independence of the Republic of Kazakhstan" (2016)
