= Ministry of Tourism and Sports (Kazakhstan) =

Ministry of Tourism and Sports of the Republic of Kazakhstan
- Қазақстан Республикасы Туризм және спорт министрлігі (Kazakh); Министерство туризма и спорта Республики Казахстан (Russian)
- Emblem of Kazakhstan

Agency overview
- Formed: 27 March 2006; 1 September 2023 (current form)
- Preceding agencies: Ministry of Culture, Information and Sports; Ministry of Culture and Sports
- Jurisdiction: Government of Kazakhstan
- Headquarters: 8 Mangilik El Avenue, House of Ministries, Entrance 15, Astana 010000, Kazakhstan; 51°07′41″N 71°25′50″E
- Minister responsible: Erbol Myrzabosynov, Minister of Tourism and Sports
- Website: www.gov.kz/memleket/entities/tsm

The Ministry of Tourism and Sports of the Republic of Kazakhstan (MTS RK; Kazakh: Қазақстан Республикасы Туризм және спорт министрлігі, ҚР ТСМ; Russian: Министерство туризма и спорта Республики Казахстан, МТС РК) is the ministry under the Government of Kazakhstan responsible for state policy, regulation, and intersectoral coordination in the fields of tourism, physical culture, and sports.

== History ==
The Ministry of Tourism and Sports of the Republic of Kazakhstan was established on 27 March 2006 by Presidential Decree No. 73, signed by President Nursultan Nazarbayev. The decree reorganized the Ministry of Culture, Information and Sports by dividing it into two separate bodies—the Ministry of Culture and Information and the newly created Ministry of Tourism and Sports. It also transferred tourism-development functions from the Ministry of Industry and Trade to the new ministry. As part of the restructuring, the Committee on Sports Affairs was abolished, and the ministry assumed full responsibility for state policy in tourism and sports. Temirkhan Dosmukhambetov was appointed the first Minister of Tourism and Sports.

On 20 January 2012, the Ministry under Presidential Decree No. 226 was reorganized into the Agency of the Republic of Kazakhstan for Sports and Physical Culture with transfer of functions and powers in the field of tourism activity to the Ministry of Industry and New Technologies.

On 1 September 2023, President Kassym-Jomart Tokayev signed a Presidential Decree No. reorganizing the Ministry of Culture and Sports. As part of this restructuring, the ministry was divided and the Ministry of Tourism and Sports was re-established as an independent central executive body. Ermek Marjyqpaev was appointed on 2 September as the first minister of the re-established ministry.

== Structure ==
Departments

- Media Relations
- Finance
- Digitalization
- Administrative Work
- Internal Audit
- Legal Services
- Human Resources
- Strategic Planning & Project Management
- International Cooperation

Committees

- Tourism Industry Committee
- Committee for Sports and Physical Culture

Service

- Information Security Service

== Subordinate organizations ==
- Center for Sports Medicine and Rehabilitation
- Athletes' Anti-Doping Laboratory
- National Anti-Doping Center
- Republican Specialized Boarding School–College of Olympic Reserve
- Boarding School–College of Olympic Reserve (Ridder)
- Boarding College named after Karken Akhmetov
- Boarding College named after Khadzhimukan Munaitpasov
- Zhubanov Specialized Music School for Gifted Children
- Baiseitova Specialized Music School for Gifted Children
- Almaty College of Decorative and Applied Arts named after O. Tansykbaev
- Republican Variety and Circus College named after Zh. Elebekov
- Almaty Choreographic School named after A. Seleznev
- Almaty Music College named after P. Tchaikovsky
- Kazakh National Academy of Choreography
- Kazakh National Academy of Arts named after T. K. Zhurgenov
- Kazakh National University of Arts
- Kazakh National Conservatory named after Kurmangazy

== List of ministers ==
- Temirkhan Dosmukhambetov (27 March 2006 – 11 April 2011)
- Talğat Ermegiaev (11 April 2011 – 20 January 2012)
- Vacant; ministry defunct (2012–2023)
- Ermek Marjyqpaev (2 September 2023 – 31 August 2024)
- Erbol Myrzabosynov (2 September 2024 – present)
