= Security Council of Kazakhstan =

Constitutional advisory body of the Kazakh Government

- Қазақстан Республикасының Қауіпсіздік Кеңесі
- Ak Orda Presidential Palace, which is the residence of the President of Kazakhstan, is also the meeting place of the Security Council

Agency overview
- Formed: 16 December 1991
- Preceding agency: Security Council of the Kazakh SSR
- Jurisdiction: Government of Kazakhstan
- Headquarters: Astana

The Security Council of the Republic of Kazakhstan (Security Council, Kazakh: Қазақстан Республикасының Қауіпсіздік Кеңесі, romanized: Qazaqstan Respublikasynyñ Qauıpsızdık Keñesı) is a constitutional advisory body of the Kazakh Government which aides and assists the President of Kazakhstan in implementation of military policy and law enforcement. The President, who is the Supreme Commander–in–Chief of the Armed Forces of Kazakhstan, is one of many permanent members of the council, which includes the Minister of Defence and the Chief of the General Staff.

The current chairman is President Kassym–Jomart Tokayev, following the 5 January 2022, dismissal of former President Nursultan Nazarbayev as chairman. The Secretary of the Security Council (currently Gizat Nurdauletov) is the second highest position in the council.

== List of Chairmen ==
No.	Image	Name (Birth–Death)	In office			Election	Party	President	Note
No.	Image	Name (Birth–Death)	Start office	End office	Office time	Election	Party	President	Note
1		Nursultan Nazarbayev (born 1940)	21 August 1991	5 January 2022	30 years, 137 days	None	QKP	Himself	
1		Nursultan Nazarbayev (born 1940)	21 August 1991	5 January 2022	30 years, 137 days	1991	Independent	Himself	
1		Nursultan Nazarbayev (born 1940)	21 August 1991	5 January 2022	30 years, 137 days	1999	Independent	Himself	
1		Nursultan Nazarbayev (born 1940)	21 August 1991	5 January 2022	30 years, 137 days	2005	Amanat	Himself	
1		Nursultan Nazarbayev (born 1940)	21 August 1991	5 January 2022	30 years, 137 days	2011	Amanat	Himself	
1		Nursultan Nazarbayev (born 1940)	21 August 1991	5 January 2022	30 years, 137 days	2015	Amanat	Himself	
1		Nursultan Nazarbayev (born 1940)	21 August 1991	5 January 2022	30 years, 137 days	2019	Amanat	Kassym–Jomart Tokayev	
2		Kassym–Jomart Tokayev (born 1953)	5 January 2022	Incumbent	4 years, 277 days	None	Amanat	Himself	
2		Kassym–Jomart Tokayev (born 1953)	5 January 2022	Incumbent	4 years, 277 days	2022	Independent	Himself	

== History ==
The Security Council dates back to 21 August 1991, when it was founded as the Security Council of the Kazakh Soviet Socialist Republic, which was created by decree of then–President Nazarbayev. It would later be transformed into the Security Council of the Republic of Kazakhstan in June 1993. The current mandate and regulations of the Security Council were approved by the government on 20 March 1999. The office of Secretary of the Security Council is the effective chief of the council who reports to the chairman. The position was introduced in June 1994 and has remained an important component of the Security Council. An amendment passed by parliament in May 2018 defines the decisions made by the council to be "mandatory and are subject to strict execution by state bodies, organisations and officials of the Republic of Kazakhstan."

== Mandate ==
The Security Council of Kazakhstan has the following mandates:

- To ensure that the president has full control to exercise his/her national security powers.
- To form and implementation a national security policy.
- To recommend options prior to him/her making decisions on domestic and foreign policy issues related to national security.
- To prepare the carrying out of international agreements that repeated to national security.

== Current membership (2026) ==
Position	Name
President (as Chair of the Security Council)	Kassym-Jomart Tokayev
Vice President of Kazakhstan	Erlan Karin
Deputy Chairman	Aida Balaeva
Chairman of the Kurultai	Aibek Dädebai
Prime Minister	Oljas Bektenov
Aqorda Chief of Staff	Roman Sklyar
Prosecutor General of Kazakhstan	Berik Assylov
Chairman of the National Security Committee	Ermek Sağymbaev
Head of the State Security Service	Saken Isabekov
Foreign Minister	Mukhtar Tleuberdi
Minister of Defence	Däuren Qosanov
Minister of Internal Affairs	Erjan Sädenov
Minister of Emergency Situations	Murat Muhanov

== List of leaders ==
The council is presided over by the Chairman, who is the President of Kazakhstan, and de-facto led by the Deputy Chairman. Before 2026, that position belonged to the Secretary of the Security Council.

=== Secretaries (1994–2026) ===
- Bulat Baekenov (June 1994 – October 1994)
- Tulegen Zhukeyev (October 1994 – October 1995)
- Baltash Tursymbaev (October 1995 – October 1996)
- Beksultan Sarsekov (October 1996 – February 1999)
- Marat Tajin (24 February 1999 – 5 May 2001)
- Altynbek Sarsenbayuly (5 May 2001 – 11 December 2001)
- Marat Tajin (11 December 2001 – 29 August 2002)
- Omarkhan Oksikbaev (August 29, 2002 – June 16, 2003)
- Bulat Utemuratov (June 2003 – March 2006)
- Marat Tajin (April 2006 – January 2007)
- Berik Imashev (January 2007 – August 2008)
- Kairbek Suleimenov (August 2008 – September 2009)
- Marat Tajin (September 2009 – January 2013)
- Qairat Qojamjarov (January 2013 – August 2014)
- Nurlan Yermekbayev (November 2014 – September 13, 2016)
- Vladimir Jumaqanov (September 13, 2016 – 4 April 2018)
- Nurlan Yermekbayev (4 April 2018 – 7 August 2018)
- Gabit Baijanov (September 2018 – 12 February 2019)
- Kalmukhanbet Kassymov (12 February 2019 – 16 January 2020)
- Asset Issekeshev (16 January 2020 – 25 February 2022)
- Gizat Nurdauletov (25 February 2022 – 31 August 2026)

=== Deputy Chairs (2026–present) ===
- Aida Balaeva (since 31 August 2026)

== See also ==
- Government of Kazakhstan
- Security Council of Belarus
- National Security and Defense Council of Ukraine
- Security Council of Russia
