= Baurzhan Mukhamejanov =

Kazakh politician (born 1960)

Baurjan Mūhamedjanov
- Бауыржан Мұхаметжанов
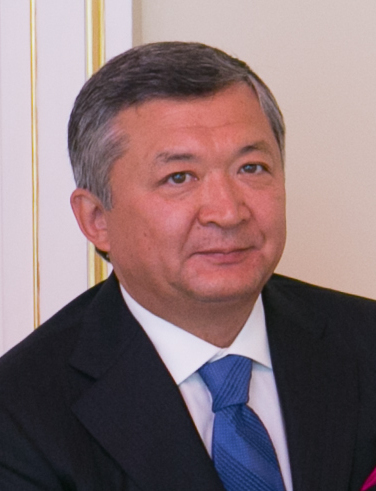
- Mūhamedjanov in 2013

Deputy Prime Minister of Kazakhstan
- In office 29 January 2002 – 13 June 2003
- Prime Minister: Imangali Tasmagambetov; Kassym-Jomart Tokayev

Minister of Internal Affairs
- In office 14 October 2005 – 2 April 2009
- President: Nursultan Nazarbayev
- Prime Minister: Karim Massimov; Daniyal Akhmetov
- Preceded by: Zautbek Turisbekov
- Succeeded by: Serik Baimaganbetov

Minister of Justice
- In office 13 October 1997 – 13 September 2000
- President: Nursultan Nazarbayev
- Prime Minister: Kassym-Jomart Tokayev; Nurlan Balgimbayev
- Preceded by: Konstantin Kolpakov
- Succeeded by: Igor Rogov

Member of the Senate of Kazakhstan
- In office 2 April 2009 – 22 December 2011

Äkim of Mangystau Region
- In office 22 December 2011 – 18 January 2013
- Preceded by: Krymbek Kusherbayev
- Succeeded by: Alik Aidarbaev

Kazakhstan Ambassador to Georgia
- In office 31 May 2018 – 9 December 2022
- Preceded by: Ermukhamet Ertysbayev
- Succeeded by: Ermukhamet Ertysbayev

Kazakhstan Ambassador to Lithuania
- In office 26 March 2013 – 29 May 2018
- Preceded by: Galymzhan Koishybaev
- Succeeded by: Vïktor Temirbaev

Kazakhstan Ambassador to Latvia
- In office 21 May 2013 – 29 May 2018
- Preceded by: Galymzhan Koishybaev
- Succeeded by: Vïktor Temirbaev (2019)

Personal details
- Born: 26 November 1960 (age 65) Merki, Kazakh SSR, Soviet Union
- Spouse: Zarema Khaidarovna Mukhamedzhanova
- Children: 2
- Education: Kazakh State University named after S.M. Kirov
- Profession: Lawyer
- Awards: II and III degree Barys Order, Parassat Order

Bauyrjan Älımūly Mūhamedjanov (Note: Often transliterated as Baurzhan Alimovich Mukhamedzhanov through a Russified Romanization of Бауржан Алимович Мухамеджанов.) (Kazakh: Бауыржан Әлімұлы Мұхамеджанов; born 26 November 1960) is a Kazakh politician and Doctor of Law who served as Kazakhstan's ambassador to Georgia from May 30, 2018 to December 9, 2022. Prior to that, Mukhamejanov was the ambassador to Lithuania and Latvia, äkim of Mangystau Region from 22 December 2011 to 18 January 2013, Minister of Internal Affairs from 14 October 2005 to 2 April 2009, Deputy Prime Minister of Kazakhstan from 29 January 2002 to 13 June 2003, and Minister of Justice from 13 October 1997 to 13 September 2000.

== Biography ==
=== Early life and education ===
Baurzhan Mukhamejanov was born to a Muslim family in the Kazakh village of Merki. He is the son of Alim Mukhamedjanov. In 1983, he graduated from Al-Farabi Kazakh National University with a degree in law.

In 1990, he defended his candidate thesis on the theme "Ecological Function of the Soviet State" and in 2008, the doctoral thesis on the theme "Form of Government of the Republic of Kazakhstan: Constitutional Model and Government Control Practice" in the Russian Presidential Academy of National Economy and Public Administration.

=== Career ===
Mukhamejanov started his career in 1983 as a research assistant, teacher of the State and Law Theory and History Division of the Law Department in the Al-Farabi Kazakh National University.

From 1990 to 1994, he was a senior consultant, head of the Sector, deputy head of the Department, head of the Secretariat of the Chairman and the Legislation and Legal Due Diligence Department of the Supreme Soviet of Kazakhstan. From February to April 1994, Mukhamejanov took the position of Deputy Head, then Head of the Legislative Initiatives Department of the Presidential Administration of Kazakhstan. In February 1994, Mukhamejanov became the Head of the Legislation and Legal Due Diligence Department of the Administration. From December 1996, he served as the Head of the Department for Legislation, Judicial and Legal System until becoming the Secretary of the Supreme Court Council of Kazakhstan.

While serving as a Secretary, Mukhamejanov was appointed as a Minister of Justice on 13 October 1997. From September 2000, he was the Head of the State and Legal Department and Deputy Head of the Presidential Administration. While serving the post, Mukhamejanov became the Chairman of the Permanently Functioning Meeting on the issues of democratization in Kazakhstan in 2001. On 29 January 2002, he was appointed as a Deputy Prime Minister of Kazakhstan.

From 2003, Mukhamejanov served as the Deputy of Presidential Administration of the President and at the same time from March 2004 as the Head of the Organizational and Control Work and Staffing Policy Administration and the Head of the State Legal Directorate. In December 2004, Mukhamejanov was appointed as the Chairman of the Commission for Higher Military and Other Ranks. He served the post until he became the Minister of Internal Affairs on 14 October 2005 and at the same time was a member of the Security Council of Kazakhstan. During his tenure, he became the Chairman of the National Coordinators Council of the Central Asian Regional Information Coordination Center on 26 February 2009 to combat trafficking in narcotic drugs, psychotropic substances and their precursors. This Center included countries Kazakhstan, Azerbaijan, Uzbekistan, Kyrgyzstan, Tajikistan, and Turkmenistan.

On 2 April 2009, Mukhamejanov as a member of the member of the Senate of Kazakhstan. He worked in this position until becoming the äkim of Mangystau Region on 22 December 2011 following the Zhanaozen massacre. He was eventually replaced by Alik Aidarbaev on 18 January 2013.

On 26 March 2013, he became the Ambassador of Kazakhstan to Lithuania, and from 21 May 2013, Mukhamejanov was the ambassador to Latvia at the same time. On May 30, 2018, he was dismissed from these positions. And was appointed Ambassador to Georgia, remaining in this position until December 9, 2022.

== Law making ==
Mukhamejanov was the member of work groups and participated in preparation of the following laws of the Republic of Kazakhstan:

1) Kazakh SSR State Sovereignty Declaration – October 25, 1990;

2) State Independence Constitutional Law of the Republic of Kazakhstan dated December 16, 1991;

3) The first Constitution of independent Kazakhstan adopted in 1993;

4) 1995 Constitution. Under supervision of the RK President N.A. Nazarbayev. Mukhamejanov was one of three drafters together with N. Shaikenov and K. Kolpakov.

5) Being the Head of the Legislative Initiatives Department of the Office of the President of the Republic of Kazakhstan, he took part in development of more than 130 Decrees of the President having the effect of Law.

== Awards ==
- Barys Order of the II degree (2010)
- Barys Order of the III degree (2004)
- Parassat Order (1999)
- Certificate of Honour of the Republic of Kazakhstan
- Certificate of Honour of the Parliament Senate of the Republic of Kazakhstan
- Above 20 medals, including of Russian Federation, Belarus, Armenia, Azerbaijan, Georgia, Ukraine, Kyrgyzstan, Tajikistan.

== Diplomatic rank ==
On 2 July 2020, during the occasion of the Diplomatic Service Day of Kazakhstan, President Kassym-Jomart Tokayev assigned to Mukhamejanov the diplomatic rank of the Extraordinary and Plenipotentiary Ambassador.

== Notes ==
Government offices
Preceded by Krymbek Kusherbayev	Akim of Mangystau Region; 2011–2013	Succeeded by Alik Aidarbaev
Diplomatic posts
Preceded by Ermukhamet Ertysbayev	Ambassador of Kazakhstan to the Georgia; 2018–2022	Succeeded by Yerkebulan Sapiev
Preceded by Galymjan Qoishibaev	Ambassador of Kazakhstan to the Latvia; 2013–2018	Succeeded by
Preceded by Galymjan Qoishibaev	Ambassador of Kazakhstan to Lithuania; 2013–2018	Succeeded by
Political offices
Preceded by Konstantin Kolpakov	Minister of Justice of Kazakhstan; 1997–2000	Succeeded by Igor Rogov
Preceded by Zautbek Turisbekov	Minister of Internal Affairs of Kazakhstan; 2005–2009	Succeeded by Serik Baymagambetov

Minister of Internal Affairs	Minister of Economic Development and Trade	Minister of Industry and New Technologies	Minister of Foreign Affairs	Minister of Culture *	Minister of Communication and Information *	Minister of Economic Integration Affairs
K. Kassymov (since April 12, 2011); S. Baimaganbetov (since April, 2 2009); B. Mukhamedzhanov	B. Sagintayev (since January 20, 2012); K. Kelimbetov (since April 11, 2011); Zh. Aitzhanova (since March, 12 2010)	A. Issekeshev (since March 12, 2010)	Ye. Kazykhanov (since April 11, 2011); K. Saudabayev (since September 4, 2009); M. Tazhin	M. Kul-Mukhamed (since March 12, 2010)	A. Zhumagaliyev (since March 12, 2010)	Zh. Aitzhanova (since April 16, 2011)
K. Kassymov (since April 12, 2011); S. Baimaganbetov (since April, 2 2009); B. Mukhamedzhanov	Minister of Economy and Budget Planning *	Minister of Industry and Trade *	Ye. Kazykhanov (since April 11, 2011); K. Saudabayev (since September 4, 2009); M. Tazhin	Minister of Culture and Information		Minister of Oil and Gas
K. Kassymov (since April 12, 2011); S. Baimaganbetov (since April, 2 2009); B. Mukhamedzhanov	B. Sultanov (since August 2007); A. Mussin	A. Issekeshev (since May 21, 2009); V. Shkolnik (since February 2008); G. Orazbakov	Ye. Kazykhanov (since April 11, 2011); K. Saudabayev (since September 4, 2009); M. Tazhin	D. Mynbay (since January 23, 2012); M. Kul-Mukhamed (since May 12, 2008); Ye. Yertysbayev		S. Mynbayev since March 12, 2010
Minister of Education and Science	Minister of Industry and Trade	Minister of Agriculture	Minister of Oil and Gas	Minister of Labor and Social Protection		Minister of Energy and Mineral Resources *
B. Zhumagulov (since September 22, 2010); Zh. Tuimebayev	N. Kapparov (since January 20, 2012); N. Ashim (since March 4, 2009); N. Iskakov	A. Mamytbekov (since April 11, 2011); A. Kurishbayev (since April 4, 2008); A. Yessimov	A. Zhumagaliyev (since January 21, 2012); B. Kamaliyev (since April 12, 2011); A. Kussainov (since March 3, 2009); S. Akhmetov	G. Abdykalikova (since March 4, 2009); B. Saparbayev (since August 2007); G. Karagussova		S. Mynbayev (since August 27, 2007); B. Izmukhambetov
Minister of Finance	Minister of Emergencies	Minister of Health	Minister of Defense	Minister of Justice		Minister of Tourism and Sport *
B. Zhamishev (since November 13, 2007); N. Korzhova	V. Bozhko (since November 13, 2007); V. Khrapunov	S. Kairbekova (since October 7, 2010); Zh. Doskaliyev (since November 20, 2008); A. Dernovoy	A. Jaksybekov (since June 24, 2009); D. Akhmetov	B. Imashev (since January 20, 2012); R. Tussupbekov (since April 2, 2009); Z. Baliyeva		T. Yermegiyayev (since April 11, 2011); T. Dosmukhambetov
• Position was abolished.

Minister of Internal Affairs	Minister of Health	Minister of Industry and Trade	Minister of Foreign Affairs	Minister of Culture and Information	Minister of Tourism and Sport
B. Mukhamedzhanov ((since October 14, 2005)); Z. Turisbekov (since September 12, 2003); K. Suleimenov	A. Dernovoy (since September 20, 2006); Ye. Dossayev (since April 5, 2004); Zh. Doskaliyev	V. Shkolnik (since January 19, 2006); S. Mynbayev (since December 2004); A. Jaksybekov	K. Tokayev	Ye. Yertysbayev (since March 2006)	T. Dosmukhambetov (since March 2006)
B. Mukhamedzhanov ((since October 14, 2005)); Z. Turisbekov (since September 12, 2003); K. Suleimenov	A. Dernovoy (since September 20, 2006); Ye. Dossayev (since April 5, 2004); Zh. Doskaliyev	V. Shkolnik (since January 19, 2006); S. Mynbayev (since December 2004); A. Jaksybekov	K. Tokayev	Ministry of Culture, Information and Sport	
B. Mukhamedzhanov ((since October 14, 2005)); Z. Turisbekov (since September 12, 2003); K. Suleimenov	A. Dernovoy (since September 20, 2006); Ye. Dossayev (since April 5, 2004); Zh. Doskaliyev	V. Shkolnik (since January 19, 2006); S. Mynbayev (since December 2004); A. Jaksybekov	K. Tokayev	Ye. Yertysbayev (since January 2006); Ye. Kossubayev (since September 29, 2004)	
B. Mukhamedzhanov ((since October 14, 2005)); Z. Turisbekov (since September 12, 2003); K. Suleimenov	A. Dernovoy (since September 20, 2006); Ye. Dossayev (since April 5, 2004); Zh. Doskaliyev	V. Shkolnik (since January 19, 2006); S. Mynbayev (since December 2004); A. Jaksybekov	K. Tokayev	Ministry of Culture	Ministry of Information
B. Mukhamedzhanov ((since October 14, 2005)); Z. Turisbekov (since September 12, 2003); K. Suleimenov	A. Dernovoy (since September 20, 2006); Ye. Dossayev (since April 5, 2004); Zh. Doskaliyev	V. Shkolnik (since January 19, 2006); S. Mynbayev (since December 2004); A. Jaksybekov	K. Tokayev	D. Kasseinov (since September 13, 2003)	A. Sarsenbaiuly (July–September 2004); S. Abdrakhmanov (since September 13, 2003)
B. Mukhamedzhanov ((since October 14, 2005)); Z. Turisbekov (since September 12, 2003); K. Suleimenov	A. Dernovoy (since September 20, 2006); Ye. Dossayev (since April 5, 2004); Zh. Doskaliyev	V. Shkolnik (since January 19, 2006); S. Mynbayev (since December 2004); A. Jaksybekov	K. Tokayev	Ministry of Culture, Information and Public Consent	
B. Mukhamedzhanov ((since October 14, 2005)); Z. Turisbekov (since September 12, 2003); K. Suleimenov	A. Dernovoy (since September 20, 2006); Ye. Dossayev (since April 5, 2004); Zh. Doskaliyev	V. Shkolnik (since January 19, 2006); S. Mynbayev (since December 2004); A. Jaksybekov	K. Tokayev	M. Kul-Mukhamed	
Minister of Education and Science	Minister of Environment Protection	Minister of Agriculture	Minister of Transport and Communications	Minister of Labor and Social Protection	Minister of Defense
B. Aitimova (since January 2006); Zh. Kulekeyev (since June 2005)	N. Iskakov (since April 2006); A. Samakov (since October 2002)	A. Yessimov (since January 19, 2006); A. Myrzakhmetov (since August 25, 2005); S. Umbetov (since May 14, 2004); A. Yessimov	S. Akhmetov (since September 25, 2006)); A. Mamin (since August 2005); K. Nagmanov	G. Karagussova	M. Altynbayev
Minister of Finance	Minister of Emergencies	Minister of Economy and Budget Planning	Minister of Energy and Mineral Resources	Minister of Justice	
N. Korzhova (since January 18, 2006); A. Dunayev (since April 4, 2004); Ye. Dossayev	Sh. Kulmakhanov (since 2005); M. Kopeyev (since 2004); N. Bizhanov (March–November 2004); Z. Nurkadilov	A. Mussin (since October 2006); K. Massimov (since April 20, 2006); K. Kelimbetov	B. Izmukhambetov (since January 19, 2006); V. Shkolnik	Z. Baliyeva (since April 2005)); O. Zhumabekov	
