= Bulat Utemuratov =

Kazakh businessman, diplomat, and philanthropist

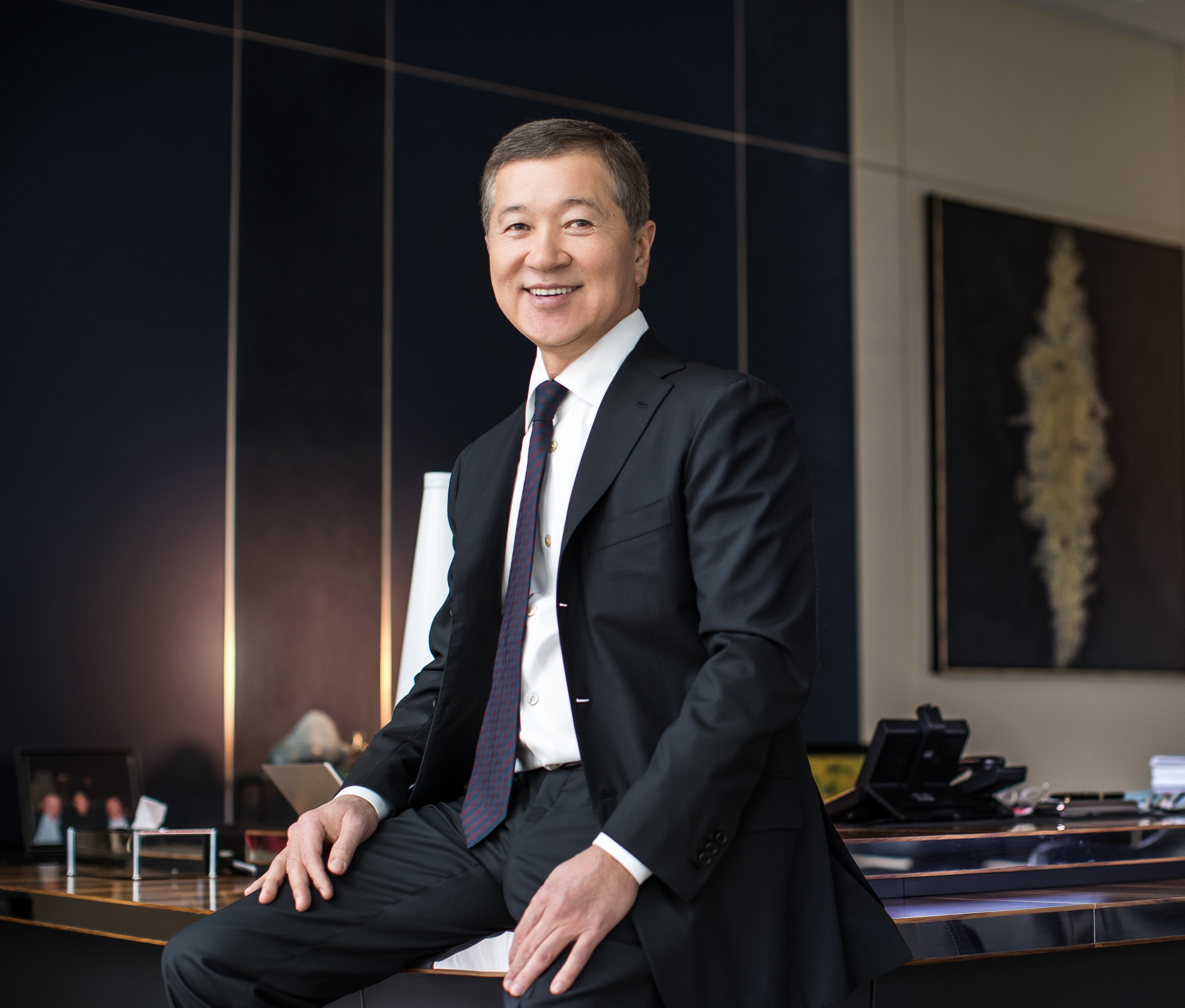

Secretary of the Security Council
- In office January 2007 – August 2008
- President: Nursultan Nazarbayev
- Preceded by: Marat Tajin
- Succeeded by: Kairbek Suleimenov

Personal details
- Born: Bulat Utemuratov; 13 November 1957 (age 68) Guryev, Guryev Oblast, Kazakh SSR, USSR
- Spouse: Utemuratova (Baishuakova) Azhar Abzhamiyevna
- Website: bulatutemuratov.com

Bulat Zhamituly Utemuratov (also called Bolat, Kazakh: Болат Жамитұлы Өтемұратов, Bolat Jamitūly Ötemūratov; born 13 November 1957) is a Kazakh businessman, public figure, diplomat and philanthropist.

== Early life and education ==
Utemuratov was born in 1957. His father worked in the judiciary and was a prosecutor, and his mother worked as an accountant. Utemuratov graduated from the Faculty of Economics of the Almaty Institute of National Economy in 1981.

== Career ==
After Kazakhstan became an independent country in 1991, President Nursultan Nazarbayev selected Utemuratov to go to Vienna and find economic opportunities for the new republic. He helped broker Kazakhstan's first line of credit with Bank Creditanstalt. In 1996 Utemuratov was appointed as ambassador to Switzerland, a position he held for three years.

After Utemuratov returned, he was made first deputy minister for external economic affairs. In 1995, Utemuratov, jointly with a group of partners, founded the Almaty Trade and Finance (ATF) Bank; by 2007 he was its controlling shareholder. In 2007, Utemuratov, along with minority shareholders, sold ATF Bank to the Italian UniCredit group for $2.3 billion. As of 2007, this transaction was the largest in the Central Independent States banking sector. Subsequent reports suggested that Utemuratov and his family members made more than $1 billion from the sale.

In 1999, Utemuratov was a member of the United Nations Economic Commission for Europe. From 2003 to 2006 he was secretary of the security council and head of the presidential property management directorate from 2006 to 2008.

From 2008 to 2013, Utemuratov, was described as an "adviser to the president" and held a role as a special representative to Kyrgyzstan. This close relationship with Nazarbayev led to Utemuratov being given the nickname "the grey cardinal" in Kazakhstan. The Times quoted a spokeswoman for Utemuratov saying he: "is neither a middleman, nor proxy for President Nazarbayev" and that he had not profited from his relationship with the President.

Kassa Nova, formerly owned by Utemuratov, was established in 2009 and was acquired in 2020 by Freedom Holding Corp for an approximate $41 million.

After Samruk-Kazyna SWF closed a sale of its shares in Temirbank and part of its shares in Alliance Bank to Utemuratov in May 2014, ForteBank was created.

As of 2013, Utemuratov was a key investor of the projects managed by Verny Capital investment group. Together with VEON he also owns telecommunication operator "KarTel" in Kazakhstan. He formerly owned "Skymobile" in Kyrgyzstan operating under the brand Beeline. Verny Capital held a majority share in gold mining company RG Gold from 2014 to 2025, alongside Resource Capital Funds, a US based private equity fund, who held a 35 percent equity stake. Utemuratov is the main shareholder of ForteBank and formerly owned the Burger King franchise in Kazakhstan.

Utemuratov is a tennis enthusiast, and has invested in development of the sport in the country. He is President of the Kazakhstan Tennis Federation since 2007. In September 2019, Utemuratov was elected as ITF Vice-president.

=== Glencore ===
In 2011, when Glencore the Swiss-based mining and commodities company, announced its initial public offering (IPO) in London, the company said that some of the proceeds would be used to buy back the Kazzinc Glencore's copper subsidiary shares held by Verny Capital. In 2012, Glencore bought the Kazzinc shares back from Verny Capital for $1.359 billion, including $400 million in cash and the rest in Glencore shares. In 2013, Glencore-controlled zinc producer Kazzinc, acquired the Vasilkovskoye gold mine in Kazakhstan from Verny Capital. As part of this transaction, Verny was given shares in Kazzinc, Kazakhstan.

In 2012, Glencore's Kazzinc subsidiary bought a 56% in a private school called Haileybury Astana for $23 million.

In 2013, Glencore gave a loan to Astana Property Management (APM), a company owned by Bulat Utemuratov via Verny Capital. The loan was to finance APM's construction of the Talan Towers hotel and apartment complex in Astana, Kazakhstan. Glencore loaned a total of $237 million to the project but the miner was forced to write off $96.5 million in 2018 after reported poor performance. Since that transaction, Utemuratov and Glencore have done several other deals together. In 2015, Glencore bought Utemuratov's Gulfstream private jet in an undisclosed transaction.

Utemuratov sold his Glencore shares in December 2021

=== Freezing of assets ===
On 1 December 2020, The Wall Street Journal reported about the freezing of Utemuratov's assets including stakes in luxury hotels, cash in bank accounts in half a dozen countries and a Burger King franchise, by a UK civil court on the claim of BTA Bank. The freezing injunction of the English Court in relation to the assets of Bulat Utemuratov was lifted in December 2020 following a settlement between the two parties.

In March 2022, Dame Margaret Hodge, a British Member of Parliament, named Utemuratov in a speech advocating for sanctions against Kazakh billionaires. Utemuratov was one of 30 oligarchs and members of the Kazakh elite who, Hodge claimed, had benefited from their ties to the Nazarbayev regime. Hodge said: “Bulat Utemuratov is a former chief of staff to Nazarbayev. A US diplomatic cable reported allegations that Utemuratov was the president’s "personal financial manager" and his own website assesses his personal wealth at $3.9 billion.”

== Personal life ==
Utemuratov is married to Utemuratova (Baishuakova) Azhar Abzhamiyevna. He has two sons and a daughter.

== Awards ==
- Order of Kurmet (2002)
