= Nurlan Yermekbayev =

Kazakh politician, diplomat, and lieutenant general (born 1963)

- Нұрлан Ермекбаев
- Yermekbayev in 2024

Secretary-General of the Shanghai Cooperation Organisation
- Incumbent
- Assumed office 1 January 2025
- Preceded by: Zhang Ming

Minister of Defense
- In office 7 August 2018 – 31 August 2021
- President: Nursultan Nazarbayev; Kassym-Jomart Tokayev
- Preceded by: Saken Zhasuzakov
- Succeeded by: Murat Bektanov

Secretary of the Security Council
- In office 4 April 2018 – 7 August 2018
- President: Nursultan Nazarbayev
- Preceded by: Vladimir Jumaqanov
- Succeeded by: Kalmukhanbet Kassymov
- In office November 2014 – September 2016
- President: Nursultan Nazarbayev
- Preceded by: Qairat Qojamjarov
- Succeeded by: Vladimir Jumaqanov

Personal details
- Born: 1 January 1963 (age 63) Shymkent, Kazakh SSR, Soviet Union

Military service
- Allegiance: USSR; Kazakhstan
- Branch/service: Soviet Army; Kazakh Ground Forces
- Years of service: 1986–1991; 2019–Present
- Rank: Lieutenant General
- Battles/wars: Angolan Civil War

Nurlan Baiuzakuly Yermekbayev (Kazakh: Нұрлан Байұзақұлы Ермекбаев, romanized: Nūrlan Baiūzaqūly Ermekbaev) is a Kazakh politician, diplomat and Lieutenant General in the Ground Forces who had been the Minister of Defense of Kazakhstan from 7 August 2018 to 31 August 2021. Ermekbaev's diplomatic rank is of Ambassador Extraordinary and Plenipotentiary.

== Biography ==
He was born on New Year's Day in 1963 in the city of Shymkent in the Kazakh SSR. He began his Moscow Institute of Chemical Engineering. In the spring of 1981, Yermekbayev was conscripted into the Soviet Armed Forces and enrolled in the army's military institute in the capital. From 1984 to 1985, he participated in combat mission of the USSR in the Republic of Angola. He graduated with honors from the Military Institute of the Ministry of Defense of the USSR in the late 1980's, specializing in knowledge of Chinese and English. After he graduated, he served until 1991 in the Armed Forces of the USSR in the Osh Region of the Kyrgyz SSR and in the city of Ust-Kamenogorsk of the Kazakh SSR. Following the collapse of the Soviet Union, Yermekbayev worked in foreign economic organizations and in trade missions at embassies of Kazakhstan.

In 2001, he served as an aide to Kuanysh Sultanov and Zhanybek Karibzhanov, who were the Ambassadors of Kazakhstan to China. Since he left that post in 2003, he served in various administrative posts at foreign policy institutions in Kazakhstan and abroad. Between 2007 and 2012, Yermekbayev worked in his position as Deputy Minister of Foreign Affairs of Kazakhstan and Assistant to the President of Kazakhstan. From April–October 2012, he was appointed to a series of ambassadorial posts in China, Vietnam, and North Korea. In 2013, during his role as Ambassador to China, he stated that "by 2050, Kazakhstan should become one of the 30 developed countries in the world". He was recalled in November 2014 to be appointed Secretary of the Security Council.

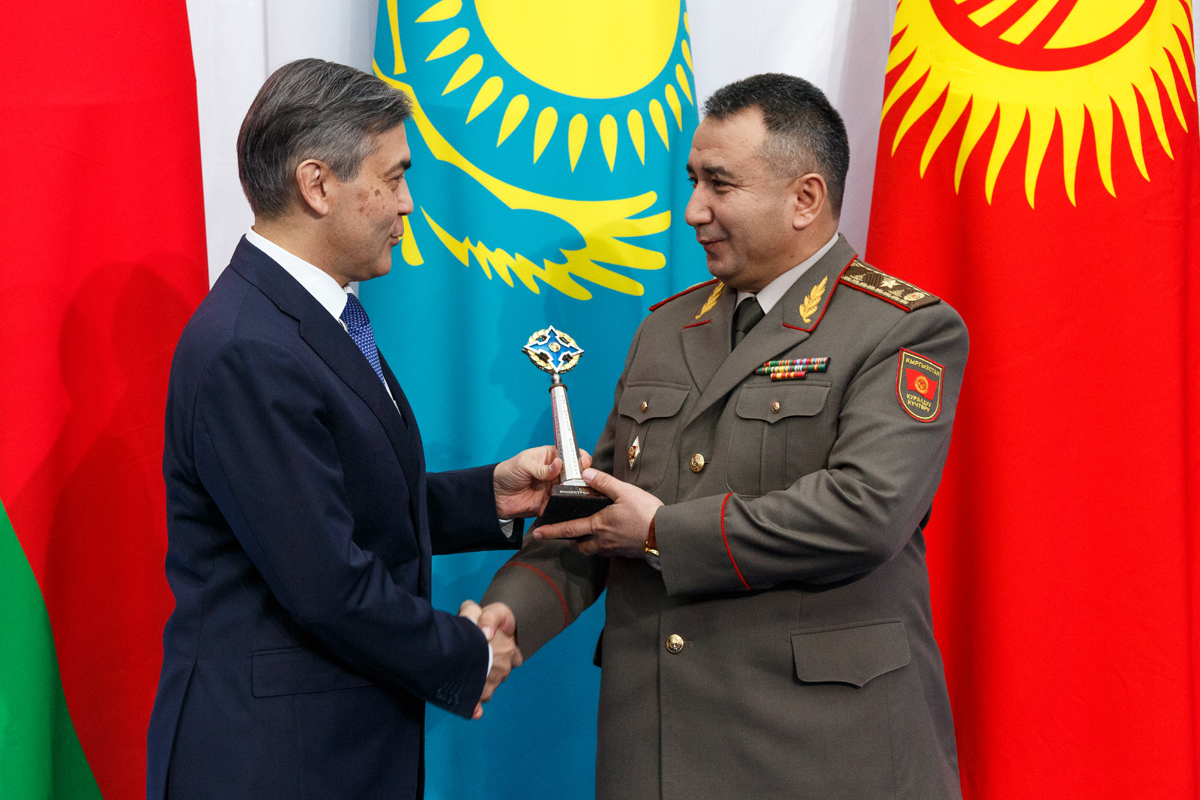
Yermekbayev with Rayimberdi Duishenbiev, 8 November 2018.

=== Minister for Religious Affairs and Civil Society ===
On 13 September 2016, he was made Minister for Religious Affairs and Civil Society of Kazakhstan, with the ministry being established the same day. His tenure was marked with the management of the trend of Islamic extremists in Kazakhstan and Central Asia. In May 2017, Yermekbayev said that despite his efforts, "no state enjoys absolute protection" against radicalism. This followed an attack the previous summer by Islamic militants at a National Guard facility in Aktobe, which resulted in the deaths of three people. He acknowledged that because of the attacks, he ordered a moderate terrorist alert be put in place and then deactivated after the situation was stabilized, which he said "did not require much time". In an op-ed in The Diplomat, he stated that the rooting out of Islamic extremism needs to be at the "top of the global agenda" and that it "must start with young people who have been deliberately targeted by the extremists".

=== Minister of Defence ===
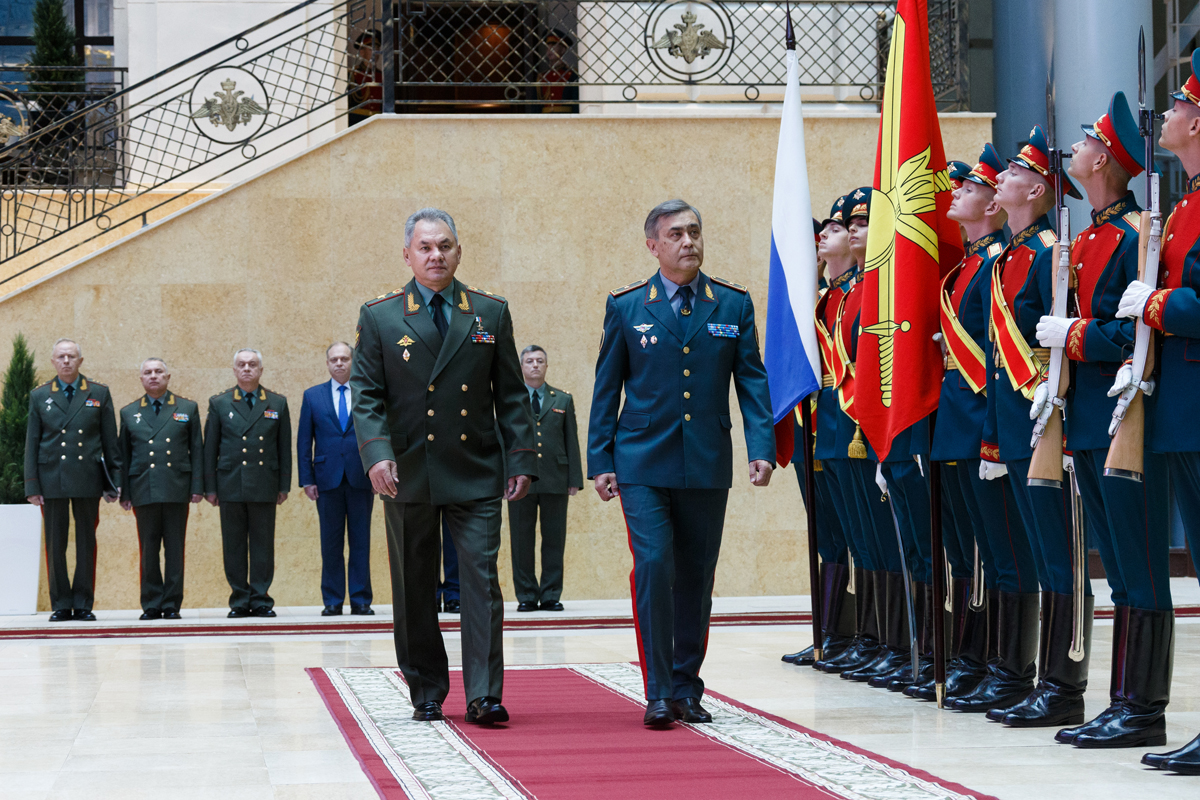
Yermekbayev and Sergey Shoygu inspecting a guard of honour at the Ministry of Defence of Russia.

On 4 April 2018, by the decree of the Nursultan Nazarbayev, he was dismissed from the post of Minister for Religious Affairs and Civil Society and was appointed Secretary of the Security Council once again. He was appointed as a Defense Minister on 7 August 2018 by Nazarbayev, succeeding Colonel General Saken Zhasuzakov. Due to his prior experience in the Soviet Army, Yermekbayev was granted the rank of Major General by Nazarbayev on 18 March 2019, effectively returning him to military service and making him the first minister to have served in a civilian and military capacity in the same tenure. In August 2019, he presided over the events of the 5th International Army Games led by the Russian Ministry of Defence, in which "over 5,000 soldiers from 39 countries are taking part" according to Yermekbayev. When describing the deployment of the KAZBAT to Lebanon as part of United Nations Interim Force in Lebanon, he said it is "a matter of national importance since it is the fulfilment by the Republic of Kazakhstan of its obligations to the world community" during working visit to the Iliyski Training Site in the Almaty Region. He later visited Beirut to meet with members of the battalion and the joint-Indian Army contingent. During this visit, he also held negotiations with National Defense Minister Elias Bou Saab.

On 6 May 2020, on the eve of the Defender of the Fatherland Day celebration, he was promoted to the rank of Lieutenant General.

=== Resignation ===
Following the explosion at the arms depot in Jambyl Region, allegedly caused by fire which resulted in injuries and deaths of several military personnel, Yermekbayev at a briefing on 27 August 2021 announced his intent to resign, adding that the final decision would be made by President Kassym-Jomart Tokayev. On 31 August, it became known that Yermekbayev's resignation was accepted, with him being succeeded by Murat Bektanov.

During one of his interviews Yermekbayev commented on his decision to resign, stating that it was a matter of an officer’s and of a general’s honor to accept political responsibility by voluntary retirement, whilst it was for the investigation to bring to account those truly responsible.

A thorough investigation of what happened lasted over two years. In October 2023, a Military Court ruled that the fire and the explosions that followed it were the result of deliberate arson committed by two servicemen with the aim of personal revenge on their superior – the commander of a military unit – for personal reasons.

These servicemen were sentenced to long terms of imprisonment. Various criminal penalties were also imposed on the officers of that military unit.

=== Shanghai Cooperation Organisation ===
In January 2023 he was appointed Deputy Secretary-General of the SCO.

In January 2025 he became the Secretary-General of the SCO.

== Personal life ==
Yermekbayev is fluent in English, Russian, Chinese, apart from his native Kazakh. His hobbies include sports, tourism and reading. In August 2018, he was elected as President of the All-Kazakhstan Association of Hand-to-Hand Fighting, later being re-elected "Honorary President" of the named Association.

He is a PhD (Candidate of Political science), as well as an author of dozens of articles and books, including co-author of the book Kazakhstan and the countries of the world.

He has been elected Honorary Professor of the Kazakh National Defence University.

While Minister of Defence in 2019, he kicked off shooting of the military movie "Patriots Time", providing idea, consulting and support for it.

== Education ==
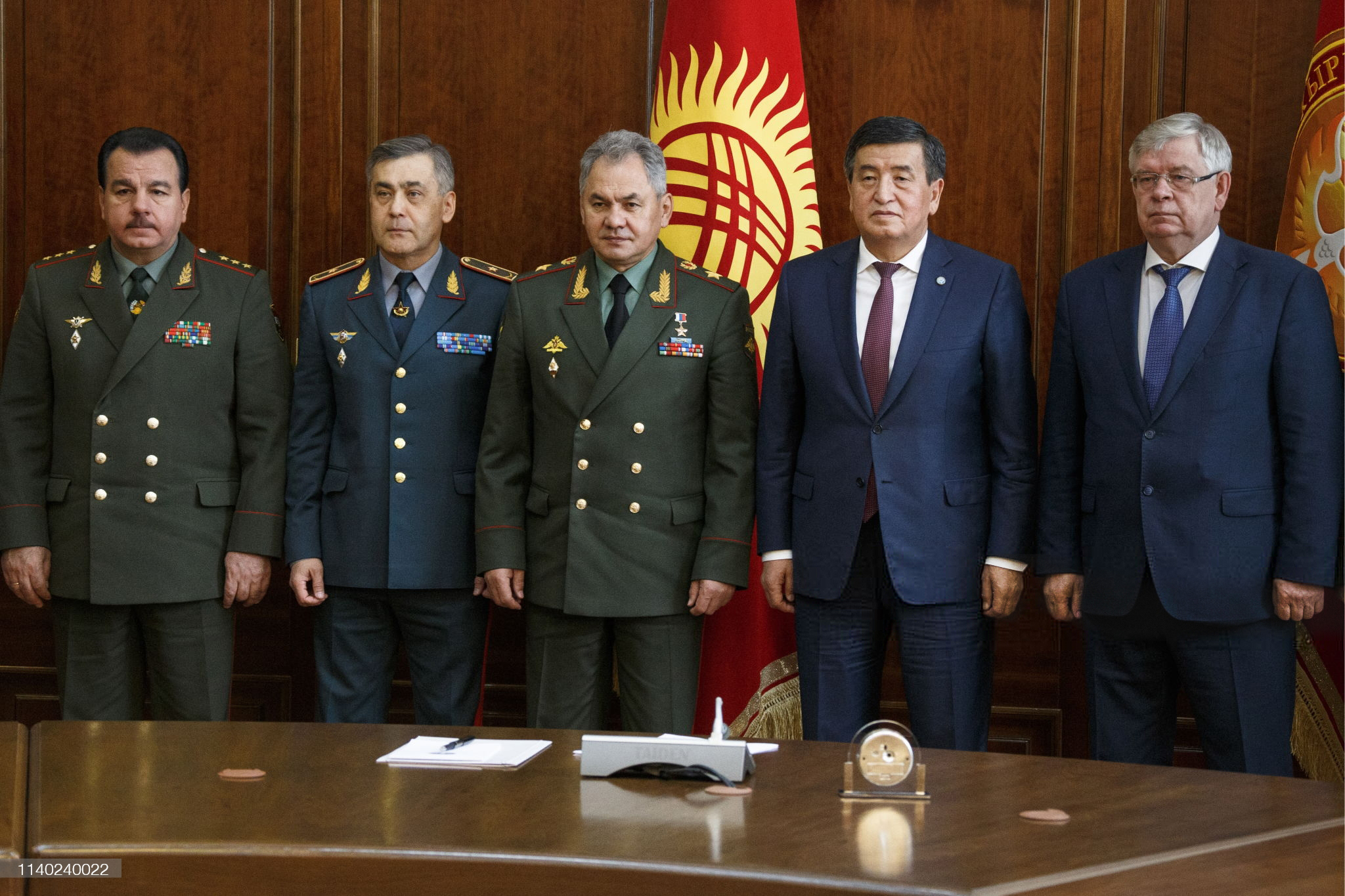
Yermekbayev (2nd from the left) in his military uniform.

- 1986 — Military Institute of the Ministry of Defense of the USSR
- 1996 — Kazakh Leading Academy of Architecture and Civil Engineering

== Awards ==
- Order of Parasat (2015)
- Order of Kurmet (2005)
- Medal "For Contribution to Foreign Intelligence"
- Jubilee Medal "70 Years of the Armed Forces of the USSR"
- Medal "20 Years of the Constitution of Kazakhstan"
- Medal "20 Years of the Armed Forces of the Republic of Kazakhstan"
- Medal "20 years of Military Intelligence"
- Medal "10 years of the Constitution of the Republic of Kazakhstan"
- Medal "20 years of the Assembly of the People of Kazakhstan"

== See also ==
- Armed Forces of the Republic of Kazakhstan
- Angola: unknown mission in Africa
