= Kalmukhanbet Kassymov =

Kazakh politician (born 1957)

- Қалмұханбет Қасымов
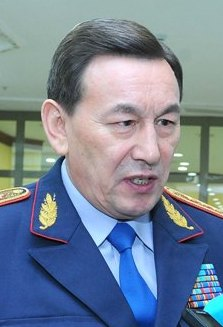
- Kassymov in 2018

Secretary of the Security Council
- In office 12 February 2019 – 16 January 2020
- Chairman: Nursultan Nazarbayev
- President: Kassym-Jomart Tokayev
- Preceded by: Gabit Baijanov
- Succeeded by: Asset Issekeshev

Head of the State Security Service
- In office 16 January 2020 – 30 July 2021
- President: Kassym-Jomart Tokayev
- Preceded by: Anuar Sadykulov

Minister of Internal Affairs
- In office 11 April 2011 – 12 February 2019
- President: Nursultan Nazarbayev
- Prime Minister: Askar Mamin; Bakhytzhan Sagintayev; Karim Massimov; Serik Akhmetov
- Preceded by: Serik Baimaganbetov
- Succeeded by: Erlan Turgymbaev

Personal details
- Born: 18 May 1957 (age 69) Dmitrievka, Kazakh SSR, Soviet Union
- Party: Nur Otan
- Spouse: Dina Kassymova
- Children: Qanat, Kamilia, Jamilia
- Education: Al-Farabi Kazakh National University

Military service
- Allegiance: Soviet Union (1979–1991); Kazakhstan (1991–present)
- Branch/service: Armed Forces of Kazakhstan
- Years of service: 1991–present
- Rank: General

Kalmukhambet Nurmukhanbetuly Kassymov (Kazakh: Қалмұханбет Нұрмұханбетұлы Қасымов, Qalmūhanbet Nūrmūhanbetūly Qasymov; born 18 May 1957) is a Kazakh politician who served as the head of the State Security Service from January 2020 until his dismissal in July 2021, likely due to the scandals revolving the Pegasus Project. Prior to that, Kassymov was the secretary of Security Council of Kazakhstan from February 2019 to January 2020 and the Minister of Internal Affairs from 2011 to 2019.

== Biography ==
=== Early life and education ===
Kassymov was born in 1957 in the village of Dmitrievka of Almaty Region. In 1979, he graduated from the law faculty of the Al-Farabi Kazakh National University, specializing in law.

=== Career ===
From 1979, he served as an investigator, senior investigator, head of the Investigative Department, deputy head of the Department of Internal Affairs of the Ili District. In 1988, he became the deputy head of the Public Order Protection Department of the Internal Affairs Directorate of the Almaty Region. From 1989 to 1992, Kassymov served as the head of the Department of Internal Affairs of Kapchagai.

From 1992, Kassymov was the head of the Criminal Police Department, first deputy head of the Internal Affairs Directorate of the Almaty Region. From March to July 1997, he served as the head of the Criminal Police Department of the Ministry of Internal Affairs of Kazakhstan. In 1997, Kassymov became the head of the Main Department of Internal Affairs of Almaty and in 2003, as the head of the Main Directorate of Internal Affairs, Department of Internal Affairs of the Almaty Region.

In June 2005, Kassymov was appointed as the Vice Minister of Internal Affairs. He served that position until he became the head of the Department of Internal Affairs of the East Kazakhstan Region in September 2009.

On 11 April 2011, Kassymov was appointed as the Minister of Internal Affairs. While serving that post, he was awarded the rank of Police Lieutenant General on 14 December 2011. On 6 May 2015, he earned rank of Colonel-General of Police.

On 12 February 2019, he was appointed as the secretary of the Security Council of Kazakhstan. On 16 January 2020, Kassymov became the head of the State Security Service. From there, he worked in the post before being relieved from his post on 30 July 2021, in which has been possibly linked to the Pegasus Project, where several Kazakh officials were targeted through surveillance by the software.
