= Serik Baimaganbetov =

Kazakh politician

Minister of Internal Affairs of Kazakhstan
- In office 2 April 2009 – 11 April 2011
- Preceded by: Baurzhan Mukhamejanov
- Succeeded by: Kalmukhanbet Kassymov

Chairman of the Customs Control Committee of the Ministry of Finance
- In office May 2011 – February 2, 2012

Serik Baimaganbetov is a Kazakh politician who served as the Minister of Internal Affairs of Kazakhstan from April 2, 2009, to April 11, 2011. He was the Chairman of the Customs Control Committee of the Ministry of Finance (Kazakhstan) from May 2011 until February 2, 2012. He also served as Kazakhstan's Foreign Minister and head of the presidential administration's law enforcement division.

== Crime ==
He was detained in February 2012 on charges of accepting bribes of $50,000. In January 2013, he was convicted of large-scale bribery and abuse of office and was sentenced to 10 years' imprisonment.

== Awards ==
- Order of Kurmet
