= Marat Ahmetjanov =

Kazakh politician (born 1964)

- Марат Ахметжанов
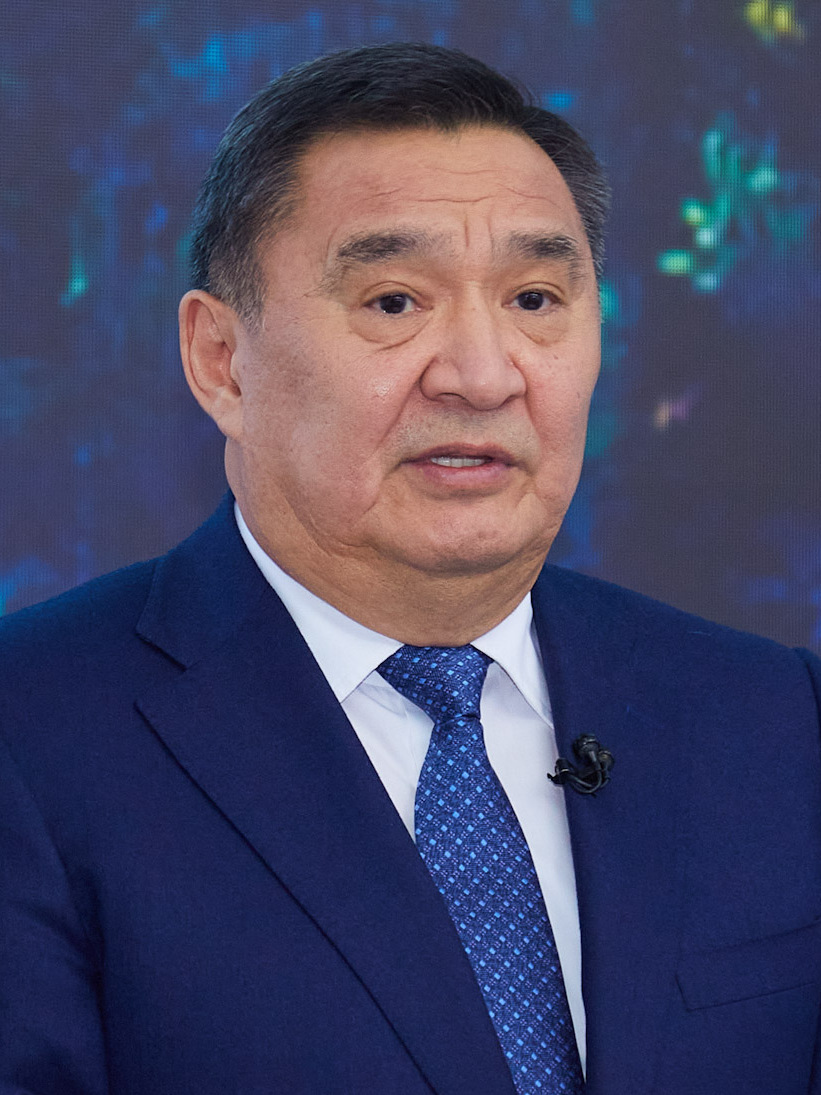
- Ahmetjanov in 2023

Äkim of Akmola Region
- Incumbent
- Assumed office 5 September 2023
- Preceded by: Ermek Marjyqpaev

Minister of Internal Affairs
- In office 25 February 2022 – 2 September 2022
- President: Kassym-Jomart Tokayev
- Prime Minister: Älihan Smaiylov
- Preceded by: Erlan Turgymbaev
- Succeeded by: Erjan Sädenov

Personal details
- Born: 22 December 1964 (age 61) Shet District, Kazakh SSR, Soviet Union
- Children: 2
- Education: Karagandy State University

Marat Mūratūly Ahmetjanov (Note: Often transliterated as Marat Muratovich Akhmetzhanov through a Russified Romanization of Марат Муратович Ахметжанов.) (Note: Kazakh: Марат Мұратұлы Ахметжанов, IPA: [mɑrɑ́t mʊrɑ́tʊɫə́ ɑχmʲetʒɑ́nəf]) (born 22 December 1964) is a Kazakh politician and military officer, who serves as Äkim of Akmola Region since September 2023.

Before that, Ahmetjanov was the Minister of Internal Affairs of Kazakhstan from 2022 to 2023.

== Biography ==
=== Early life and education ===
Ahmetjanov was born in the settlement of Akchetau, Karaganda Region on 22 December 1964. He served in the navy in 1983–1986. Ahmetjanov graduated from the Law Department, Karagandy State University in 1991.

=== Career ===
Right after graduation, Ahmetjanov joined the City of Temirtau Prosecutor's Office as a trainee and later as an investigator. As he rose in rank, Ahmetjanov held executive positions in the General Prosecutor's Office, Ministry of Justice and Ministry of Internal Affairs of the Republic of Kazakhstan.

In particular, he served as a senior investigator of major cases in the General Prosecutor's Office and a Head of Regional Investigators Unit. In 1996–1997, Ahmetjanov served as the Head of Grave Felonies Unit of the State Investigation Committee, and later led the Investigation Division of the Military Investigation Department.

In 1998–2001, Ahmetjanov served as deputy director of the Investigation Department and later as Deputy Chairman of the Judicial Decree Enforcement Committee under the Ministry of Justice of the Republic of Kazakhstan. He held positions of the Prosecutor of the Pavlodar Region and South Kazakhstan Region from 2003 until 2009. Later he was appointed Chairman of the Judicial Statistics and Special Records Committee of the General Prosecutor's Office and in 2012, Ahmetjanov came to lead Kazakhstan's Anti-Corruption Agency.

He was appointed Kazakhstan's Minister of Internal Affairs on 25 February 2022, and relieved of that position on 2 September 2023, to become the akim of Akmola Region.
