= Kairbek Suleimenov =

Kazakhstani politician (born 1949)

Qaiyrbek Süleimenov
- Қайырбек Сүлейменов

Minister of Internal Affairs
- In office January 2002 – September 2003
- President: Nursultan Nazarbayev
- Preceded by: Bulat Iskakov
- Succeeded by: Zautbek Turisbekov
- In office October 1995 – December 2000
- President: Nursultan Nazarbayev
- Preceded by: Bulat Baekenov
- Succeeded by: Bulat Iskakov

Personal details
- Born: 12 May 1949 (age 77) Novosibirsk, Novosibirsk Oblast, Russian SFSR, Soviet Union
- Education: Ural State Law University
- Awards: Hero of Kazakhstan

Qaiyrbek Şoşanūly Süleimenov (Note: Often transliterated as Kairbek Shoshanovich Suleimenov through a Russified Romanization of Каирбек Шошанович Сулейменов.) (Kazakh: Қайырбек Шошанұлы Сүлейменов; born 12 May 1949) is a Kazakhstani politician and a public figure. He has held positions of the Minister of Internal Affairs, Secretary of the Security Council, Assistant to the President of the Republic of Kazakhstan. Awarded the People's Hero of Kazakhstan award, the highest honor in Kazakhstan, in 2022.

== Biography ==
Süleimenov was born in the outskirts of Novosibirsk in May 1949 in the family of rich Kazakhs who moved from northern Kazakhstan to Siberia during collectivization reforms. Having graduated from Ural State Law University. and served in the army, he worked as a criminal case investigator in Kuibyshev municipal prosecutor's office for several years. For his contribution to solving a serious robbery case, Suleimenov was extolled in an article published in an influential Moscow newspaper, and the prosecutor of Alma-Ata invited him to work in Kazakhstan. Suleimenov later transferred to the Ministry of Internal Affairs. He had risen to the position of the First Deputy to the Minister of Internal Affairs by the time Kazakhstan gained its independence.

Süleimenov was appointed Minister in 1995 and during his two terms (1995 – 2000 and 2002 – 2003) left a major mark as he oversaw reforms of the Ministry of Internal Affairs and interior troops; he also dispensed with the Soviet name of the police force (militia).

Süleimenov served as assistant to the president and secretary of the Security Council of the Republic of Kazakhstan in 2008–2009. After his resignation, Mr. Suleimenov chaired the Veterans’ Council and worked as an MP in the Mäjilis.

Chairman of the Board of Trustees of Kazakhstan Halkyna Fund since 2022.

== Awards ==
- People's Hero of Kazakhstan (2022);
- Order of Kurmet (2017).
