= Erbol Myrzabosynov =

Kazakh politician

- Ербол Мырзабосынов
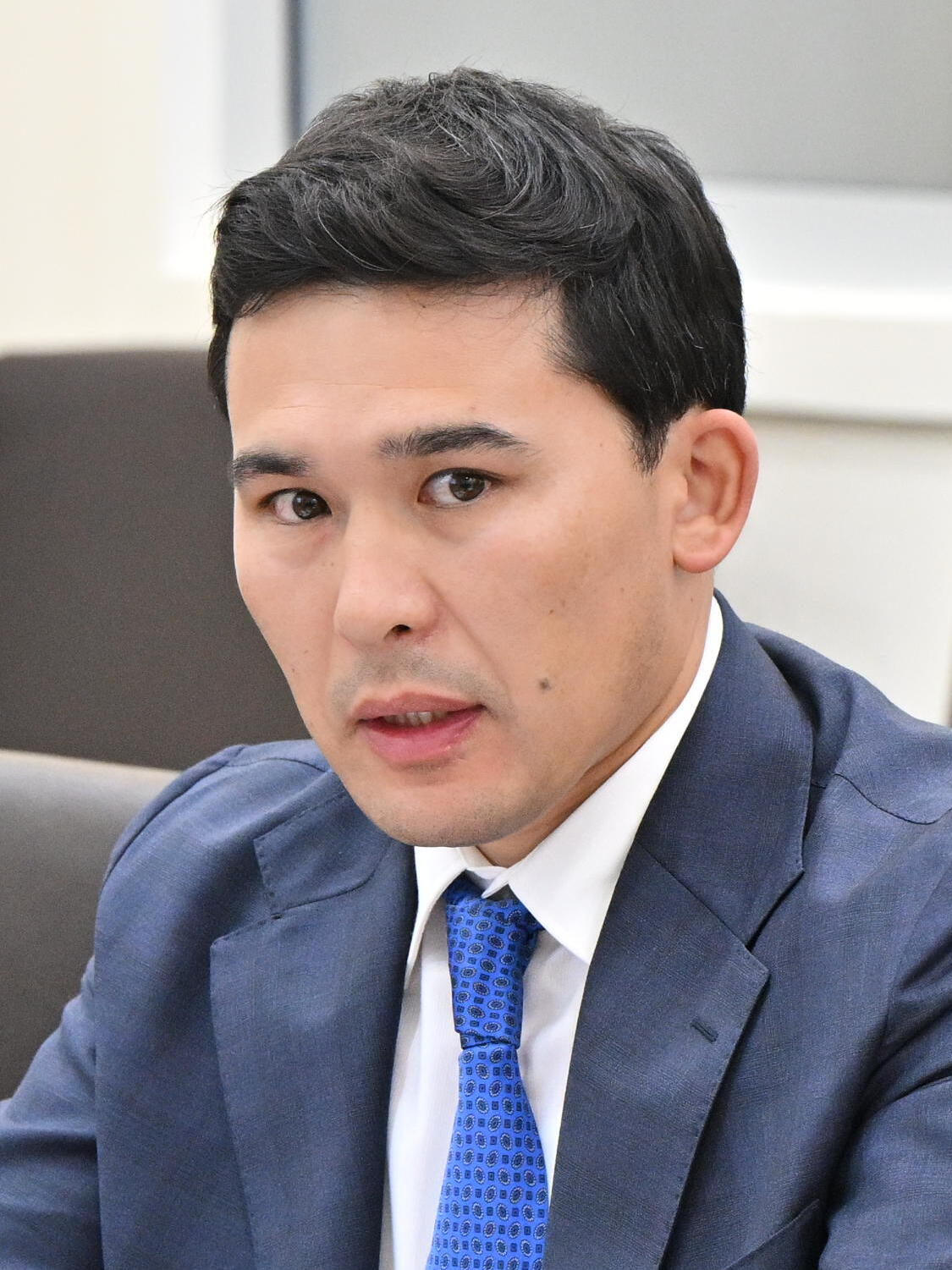
- Myrzabosynov in 2024

Minister of Tourism and Sports
- Incumbent
- Assumed office 2 September 2024
- President: Kassym-Jomart Tokayev
- Prime Minister: Oljas Bektenov
- Preceded by: Ermek Marjyqpaev

Chairman of the Committee for Sports and Physical Culture
- In office 27 February 2023 – 2 September 2024
- President: Kassym-Jomart Tokayev
- Preceded by: Samat Erğalïev
- Succeeded by: Ruslan Esenalin

Personal details
- Born: 30 August 1984 (age 42) Semipalantinsk, Kazakh SSR, Soviet Union
- Education: Semipalatinsk State Pedagogical Institute; Kazakh Humanitarian Law Innovation University

Erbol Qūantaiūly Myrzabosynov (Note: Often transliterated as Yerbol Kuantaevich Myrzabosynov through a Russified Romanization of Ербол Куантаевич Мырзабосынов.) (Kazakh: Ербол Қуантайұлы Мырзабосынов; born 30 August 1984) is a Kazakh politician serving as the Minister of Tourism and Sports of the Republic of Kazakhstan since 2 September 2024.

== Biography ==
Myrzabosynov graduated from the Semipalatinsk State Pedagogical Institute with a degree in Physical Culture and Sports, qualifying as a teacher of physical culture and sports, and later from the Kazakh Humanitarian Law Innovation University with a degree in State and Local Administration.

Myrzabosynov began his professional career as a coach-teacher at the Department of Theory and Methodology of Physical Culture and Sports at the Semipalatinsk State Pedagogical Institute from 2005 to 2006. He then served as a lecturer at the Department of Physical Education of the State Medical University of Semey from 2009 to 2013 and as head of the same department from 2013 to 2014. From 2018 to 2020, he was the director of the sports club "Qyzyljar Arlandary" in Petropavl, North Kazakhstan Region, and from 2020 to 2021, he served as managing director of the Qazaq Kuresi Association. Between 2021 and 2023, he was rector of the Academy of Physical Culture and Mass Sports in Astana, before being appointed chairman of the Committee for Sports and Physical Culture of the Ministry of Tourism and Sports on 27 February 2023.

On 2 September 2024, he became the Minister of Tourism and Sports of the Republic of Kazakhstan.
