= List of ambassadors of Kazakhstan to China =

Coordinates: 39.945438°N 116.458165°E

Ambassador of Kazakhstan to China
- Incumbent; Gabit Koishibayev since November 19, 2019
- Inaugural holder: Murat Auezov
- Formation: January 3, 1992

The Kazakh ambassador in Beijing is the official representative of the Government in Astana to the Government of the People's Republic of China with a concurrent Diplomatic accreditation in Hanoi (Vietnam), Ulaanbaatar (Mongolia) and Pyongyang (North Korea).

== List of representatives ==
Diplomatic agrément/Diplomatic accreditation	ambassador	Russian language ru:Послы Казахстана в Китае	Kazakh language	Observations	Prime Minister of Kazakhstan	Premier of the People's Republic of China	Term end
January 3, 1992	Murat Muhtarovics Auezov	ru:Ауэзов, Мурат Мухтарович	kk:Мұрат Мұхтарұлы Әуезов		Sergey Tereshchenko	Li Peng	1995
1995	Kuanysh Sultanovich Sultanov	ru:Султанов, Куаныш Султанович			Akezhan Kazhegeldin	Li Peng	2001
January 11, 2002	Zhanybek Salimovich Karibzhanov	ru:Карибжанов, Жаныбек Салимович	kk:Жәнібек Сәлімұлы Кәрібжанов		Karim Massimov	Wen Jiabao	February 2007
February 2007	Ikram Adyrbekov	ru:Адырбеков, Икрам Адырбекович		(* July 8, 1950) Almaty Veterinary Institute, attached to the President of the Russian Federation Russian Academy of Public Administration. Farm scientist, economist, state and municipal government manager, Ph.D.November 2011 was appointed assistant to the Kazakh president.	Karim Massimov	Wen Jiabao	November 2011
May 23, 2012	Nurlan Ermekbaev	ru:Ермекбаев, Нурлан Байузакович	kk:Нұрлан Байұзақұлы Ермекбаев		Serik Akhmetov	Wen Jiabao	
May 18, 2015	Shakhrat Nuryshev	Шахрат Нурышев	Шахрат Нұрышев		Karim Massimov	Li Keqiang	October 2019
November 19, 2019	Gabit Koishibayev				Askar Mamin	Li Keqiang	
