= Erlan Turgymbaev =

Kazakh politician (born 1962)

- Ерлан Тұрғымбаев
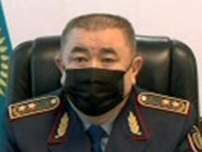
- Turgymbaev in 2021

Minister of Internal Affairs
- In office 12 February 2019 – 16 April 2022
- President: Nursultan Nazarbayev; Kassym-Jomart Tokayev
- Prime Minister: Bakhytzhan Sagintayev; Askar Mamin
- Preceded by: Kalmukhanbet Kassymov
- Succeeded by: Marat Akhmetzhanov

Personal details
- Born: 14 August 1962 (age 64) Alma-Ata, Kazakh SSR, Soviet Union
- Party: Amanat
- Spouse: Rima Jansaraeva
- Children: 2
- Education: Al-Farabi Kazakh National University

Erlan Zamanbekūly Tūrğymbaev (Note: Often transliterated as Yerlan Turgimbayev through the Russified Romanization of Russian: Ерлан Тургимбаев) (Kazakh: Ерлан Заманбекұлы Тұрғымбаев; born 14 August 1962) is a Kazakh former politician, who served as the Minister of Internal Affairs from February 2019 to April 2022.

== Early life and education ==
Turgymbaev was born in Alma-Ata (now Almaty). In 1984 he graduated from the Law Faculty of the Al-Farabi Kazakh National University specializing in law and in 2003 from the Faculty of Economics.

== Career ==
After graduating, Turgymbaev served as a detective in the criminal investigation of the Department of Internal Affairs of the Saransk City Executive Committee in the Karaganda Region. From 1986 to 2001, he held various leadership positions in the investigative and operational units of the Alatau and Kalinin district Internal Affairs departments, as well as the Police Department of Almaty.

In 2001, Turgymbaev became the managing director of NAC Kazatomprom CJSC and from 2002, he was the head of the 9th Department of the Ministry of Internal Affairs. That same year, he was appointed as the head of the Criminal Police Department of the Ministry of Internal Affairs until April 2003, when Turgymbaev became the head of the Internal Affairs Directorate of the North Kazakhstan Region. From March 2006, Turgymbaev served as chairman of the Investigative Committee of the Ministry of Internal Affairs and in August 2006, he was appointed as the head of the Department of Internal Affairs of Almaty.

In December 2012, Turgymbaev was appointed as a Deputy Minister of Internal Affairs of Kazakhstan. He served that position until he became the Minister on 12 February 2019 after his predecessor Kalmukhanbet Kassymov was appointed as a secretary of the Security Council. He held this position until February 2022, as he was appointed Advisor to the President of the Republic of Kazakhstan. He served as an adviser only until August 17, 2022.

=== Dismissal and arrest ===
During the 2022 Kazakh unrest in January, Turgymbaev, as interior minister helped oversee the police crackdown on nationwide protests and riots that left 238 people dead. He was dismissed from the ministry in February. In April 2024, he was arrested on charges of “abuse of power and official authority resulting in grave consequences” relating to the violence. On August 8, 2024, by the verdict of the Interdistrict Criminal Court of Astana, Turgymbaev was sentenced to 5 years of suspended imprisonment.
