= Kokshetau State University =

University in Kokshetau, Kazakhstan

- Көкшетау мемлекеттік университеті
- Other names: Kokshetau State University named after Shokan Ualikhanov
- Established: 1962
- Academic staff: 420
- Students: 8000
- Location: Kokshetau, Kazakhstan; 53.2832°N 69.3707°E
- Campus: urban
- Website: https://www.shokan.edu.kz/en/

Kokshetau State University (Kazakh: Көкшетау мемлекеттік университеті, romanized: Kökşetau memlekettık universitetı, Russian: Кокшетауский государственный университет, abbreviated as KSU) is a public university located in Kokshetau, Akmola Region, Kazakhstan, founded in 1962. It is named after Shokan Ualikhanov.

KSU, being a classical university, has an important social and cultural mission. According to the traditions of classical universities, the university maintains high level and fundamental character of higher education. Kokshetau State University is one of the leaders in education, science and culture of Kazakhstan. The prestige of Kokshetau State University named after Shokan Walikhanov is confirmed by international cooperation. Different public universities, home and foreign institutes work as its partners.

== History of Shokan Ualikhanov Kokshetau University (Ualikhanov University) ==
Shokan Ualikhanov Kokshetau University (also known as Ualikhanov University or Kokshetau State University named after Shokan Ualikhanov) is a leading public university in the Aqmola Region of northern Kazakhstan, located in Kokshetau. It plays a key role in higher education, teacher training, engineering, agriculture, and regional development.

== Early Years: Establishment as a Pedagogical Institute (1962–1995) ==
The university traces its origins to the Kokchetav Pedagogical Institute, established on 25 July 1962 by Resolution No. 563 of the Council of Ministers of the Kazakh SSR. The first rector was Ivan Stepanovich Gorokhvodatsky. It was created to address the acute shortage of teachers during the Virgin Lands Campaign (development of virgin and fallow lands), which led to rapid population growth and the opening of new schools in the region.

• Initial structure: One department combining Physics, Mathematics, and Philology.

• 1963: Separate Faculties of Physics-Mathematics and Philology were established. The General Technical Faculty of the Pavlodar Industrial Institute was also founded (later transferred).

• 29 March 1965: The institute was named after Shokan (Shoqan) Ualikhanov (Chokan Chingizovich Valikhanov), the prominent 19th-century Kazakh scholar, ethnographer, historian, and traveler.

• 1966: Faculty of Foreign Languages opened.

• 1979: Branch of the Tselinograd (now Nur-Sultan) Agricultural Institute opened in specialties such as Agronomy and Zootechnics. Subsequent developments included new specialties (e.g., Kazakh Language and Literature in 1982, Chemistry and Biology in 1984, Mechanization of Agriculture, Fine Arts, Informatics, etc.), construction of new buildings, and growth in student numbers (from around 400 to over 2,500).

Several rectors served during this period, including Evgeniy Ivanovich Boyarskiy (1972), Kuandyk Dosmaganbetovich Zhulamanov (1990), and Abay Ahmetgalievich Aitmukhambetov (1992).

== Transformation into a University (1996) ==
On 23 May 1996, by Order No. 143 of the Ministry of Education of the Republic of Kazakhstan, three institutions were merged to form Shokan Ualikhanov Kokshetau State University:

• Shokan Ualikhanov Kokchetav Pedagogical Institute

• S. Saduakasov Agricultural Institute

• Kokshetau branch of Karaganda Polytechnic Institute

Professor Abay Aitmukhambetov (Doctor of Physical and Mathematical Sciences) became the first rector of the new university. This merger created a multidisciplinary institution combining teacher education, agriculture, and technical/engineering programs.

== Post-1996 Developments and Modernization ==
• 1998: Introduction of a three-level education system and opening of Master's programs.

• 2001: Renamed Republican State Enterprise "Shokan Ualikhanov Kokshetau State University".

• 2003: Transition to the credit system of education.

• 2005: Received ISO 9001-2000 certification for its quality management system.

• 2012: Reorganized as a Republican State Enterprise on the right of economic management.

• 2020: Reorganized into a Non-Profit Joint-Stock Company "Shokan Ualikhanov Kokshetau University" (НАО).

The university has had several rectors since 1996, including Shakimashrip Ibraevich Ibraev (2007), Naiman Bubeevich Kalabaev (2010), Elyubaev Sagintay Zekenovich (2012), Abdumutalip Abzhapparov (2014), and Marat Kadiruly Syrlybaev (2018–present).

== Current Status and Achievements ==
Over 60+ years, the university has trained more than 50,000 specialists. It currently offers around 83 bachelor's, 44 master's, and 10 doctoral programs across education, humanities, natural sciences, engineering, agriculture, medicine, and more. It emphasizes internationalization through Erasmus+, double-degree programs, and partnerships worldwide.

== Faculty of Humanities and Social Sciences ==
History and Religious Studies, History, Scientific, History, Geography, Jurisprudence, Journalism, Theology, Psychology, Pedagogy and Psychology, Social Pedagogy and Self-knowledge (Inclusive Education Tutor), Foreign Languages, English Language, Translation Studies, Russian Language and Literature, Kazakh Language and Literature, Kazakh Philology, Russian Philology, Foreign Philology, Two Foreign Languages (English, German), Story (History-related program)

== Faculty of Education and Teacher Training ==
Preschool Education / Preschool Education and Upbringing, Primary Education, Pedagogy and Methodology of Primary Education, Chemistry and Biology in Basic School, Art Education, Physical Education and Sports Pedagogy of Primary Education (Master’s), Educational Management and Psychology, Management and Leadership in Education Programs, Management and Psychology (Educational programs)

== Faculty of Natural Sciences ==
Biology, Biotechnology, Chemistry, Fundamental and Applied Chemistry, Physics, Mathematics, Geography (Master’s level included), Ecology, Environmental Protection, Life Safety and Environmental Protection, Environmental Safety and Nature Management (Doctoral), Chemistry of Biologically Active Compounds, Physics and Modern Scientific Research, Mathematics and Scientific-Methodological Research

== Faculty of Information Technology and Engineering ==
Information Systems, Computer Hardware and Software, Computer Science, Computer Science and Robotics, Data Science, IT Project Management, Computer System and Network Security, Digital Design of Buildings and Structures, BIM Design of Buildings and Structures, Design and Computer Graphics, 3D Modeling Engineer in Mining

== Faculty of Engineering and Technical Sciences ==
Mechanical Engineering, Transport, Transport Equipment and Technologies, Operation and Repair of Motor Vehicles, Mining, Mineral Enrichment, Agricultural Machinery and Technology, Work-based Training and Entrepreneurship, Industry Management Engineering-related Applied Technologies

== Faculty of Agriculture and Environmental Sciences ==
Agronomy, Soil Science and Agrochemistry, Technology of Livestock Production, Forest Resources and Forestry, Sustainable Agriculture and Rural Development, Food Biotechnology, Waste Management Agronomy: Organic Farming in the Black Soil Zone (Doctoral)

== Faculty of Economics, Business and Management ==
Banking and Financial Management, Accounting and Economic Analysis, Finance and Social Responsibility of Business, Economy by Industry, Management by Industry, Global Management, Corporate Management, Banking Technologies and Financial Analytics, Industry Management, Public Health, Management (related interdisciplinary program)

== Faculty of Tourism and Service ==
Tourism

Tourism and Hospitality

Hospitality-related Management Programs

== Faculty of Medicine and Health Sciences ==
Medicine

Public Health

Medicine (Specialised)

Medicine (Scientific and Pedagogical)

== Faculty of Language, Literature and Linguistics ==
English Language

Translation Studies

Kazakh Language and Literature

Russian Language and Literature

Foreign Languages (English, German)

Kazakh Philology

Russian Philology

Foreign Philology

== Doctoral Studies (PhD Programs) ==
Teaching Mathematics in STEM

Methodology of Scientific Research in

Mathematics Education

Agronomy

Organic Farming in Black Soil Zone

Russian Philology

Kazakh Philology

Environmental Safety and Nature Management

Foreign Languages

Story / History-related Research

== Rankings ==
University rankings

Regional – Overall
- QS Emerging Europe and Central Asia: 301-350 (2022)

In terms of rankings, the university is one of the top 200 universities in the world according to individual indicators in the 2022 THE Impact Ranking, and it ranks 29th in the international ranking QS Central Asia - 2023.

The university's teacher education programs are ranked in the top 3 nationally. Kokshetau State University ranks 10th in the general rating of universities of the Republic of Kazakhstan. In the international rating ARES-2020 the university takes 9th place.

== KSU Campus infrastructure ==
- 8000 students, over 400 professors

== Kokshetau State University's Affiliated Hospitals ==
Multidisciplinary Regional Hospital

Multidisciplinary Regional Children's Hospital

City Polyclinic

City Multidisciplinary Hospital

Research Institute of Cardiology and Internal Medicine

National Scientific Medical Center

Bulandy District Hospital

Akkol District Hospital

Regional Ambulance Station

Regional Mental Health Center

National Expertise Center

Tube Dispensary AOCF

Viamedis LLP

Akmola Region Department of Health
