= Bulat Baekenov =

Kazakh military officer and politician (1942–2023)

Chairman of the National Security Committee
- In office 13 July 1992 – December 1993
- Preceded by: position established
- Succeeded by: Sat Tokpakbaev

Minister of Internal Affairs
- In office October 1994 – November 1995
- President: Nursultan Nazarbayev
- Preceded by: Vladimir Shumov
- Succeeded by: Kairbek Suleimenov

Personal details
- Born: Bulat Abdrakhmanovich Baekenov; 21 November 1942 Guryev, Kazakh SSR, USSR
- Died: 24 August 2023 (aged 80)
- Party: CPSU (until 1991)
- Education: Karagandy State University
- Occupation: Military officer

Bulat Abdrakhmanovich Baekenov (Kazakh: Болат Әбдірахманұлы Баекенов, Bolat Äbdırahmanūly Baekenov; 21 November 1942 – 24 August 2023) was a Kazakh military officer and politician. He served as Minister of Internal Affairs from 1994 to 1995.

Baekenov died on 24 August 2023, at the age of 80.
