= Bulat Iskakov =

Kazakhstani politician (born 1947)

Bolat Gazizuly Iskakov (Kazakh: Болат Ғазизұлы Ысқақов, Bolat Ğazizūly Ysqaqov; born 9 February 1947) is a Kazakhstani politician. He served as the commander of the Kazakhstan Republican Guard from the end 1999 to the end of 2000 when we was appointed the minister for internal affairs from 2000 to 2001. Following his term as a minister, he returned to command the Republican Guard through to the beginning of 2006. He was then appointed Kazakhstan's ambassador to Belarus from 2006 until 2008.

== Biography ==
Iskakov was born in Ushtobe a town in the Almaty Region of Kazakhstan. Isakakov began his working life in 1966 as a teacher at a secondary school in Kaskelen. He then worked in mine No. 39 of the Leninogol trust in Karaganda from 1967 until 1970. Iskakov graduated from the Karaganda Higher School of Militia in 1974, then from the Academy of the Ministry of Internal Affairs of the USSR in Moscow in 1981.

Iskakov began working the Ministry of Internal Affairs from 1974 as an inspector with the Karaganda Regional Executive Committee.

From 1983 to 1985, he was a head of the Internal Affairs Directorate of the Executive Committee of the Shakhtinsk City Council of People's Deputies of the Karaganda Region.

Before becoming the minister, Iskakov worked in a number of other positions, including with the ministry's Criminal Investigation Department and, in 1991, head of the Department of Public Order Protection.

From December 1991 to October 1992, Iskakov was a deputy minister of internal affairs of the Republic of Kazakhstan.

In 1995, he worked as a head of the Almaty Higher School of the Ministry of Internal Affairs of Kazakhstan.

In 1999-2000, he was a commander of the Republican Guard of Kazakhstan.

== See also ==
- Government of Kazakhstan
- Foreign relations of Kazakhstan
