= Ephedra =

Ephedra may refer to:

- Ephedra (medicine), a medicinal preparation from the plant Ephedra sinica
- Ephedra (plant), genus of gymnosperm shrubs

== See also ==
- Ephedrine
