= Law enforcement in Kazakhstan =

Police of Kazakhstan
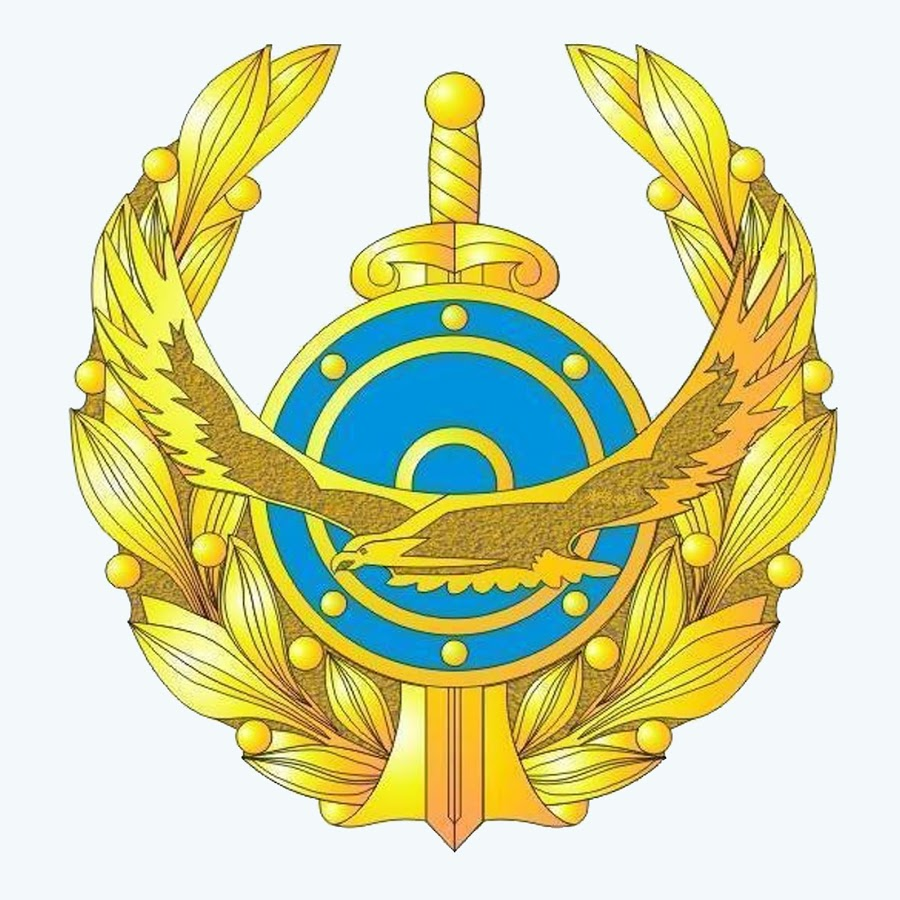

Agency overview
- Formed: 23 June 1992; 34 years ago
- Jurisdiction: Government of Kazakhstan
- Agency executive: Erlan Turgymbaev, Chief of police
- Parent department: Ministry of Internal Affairs
- Website: www.polisia.kz

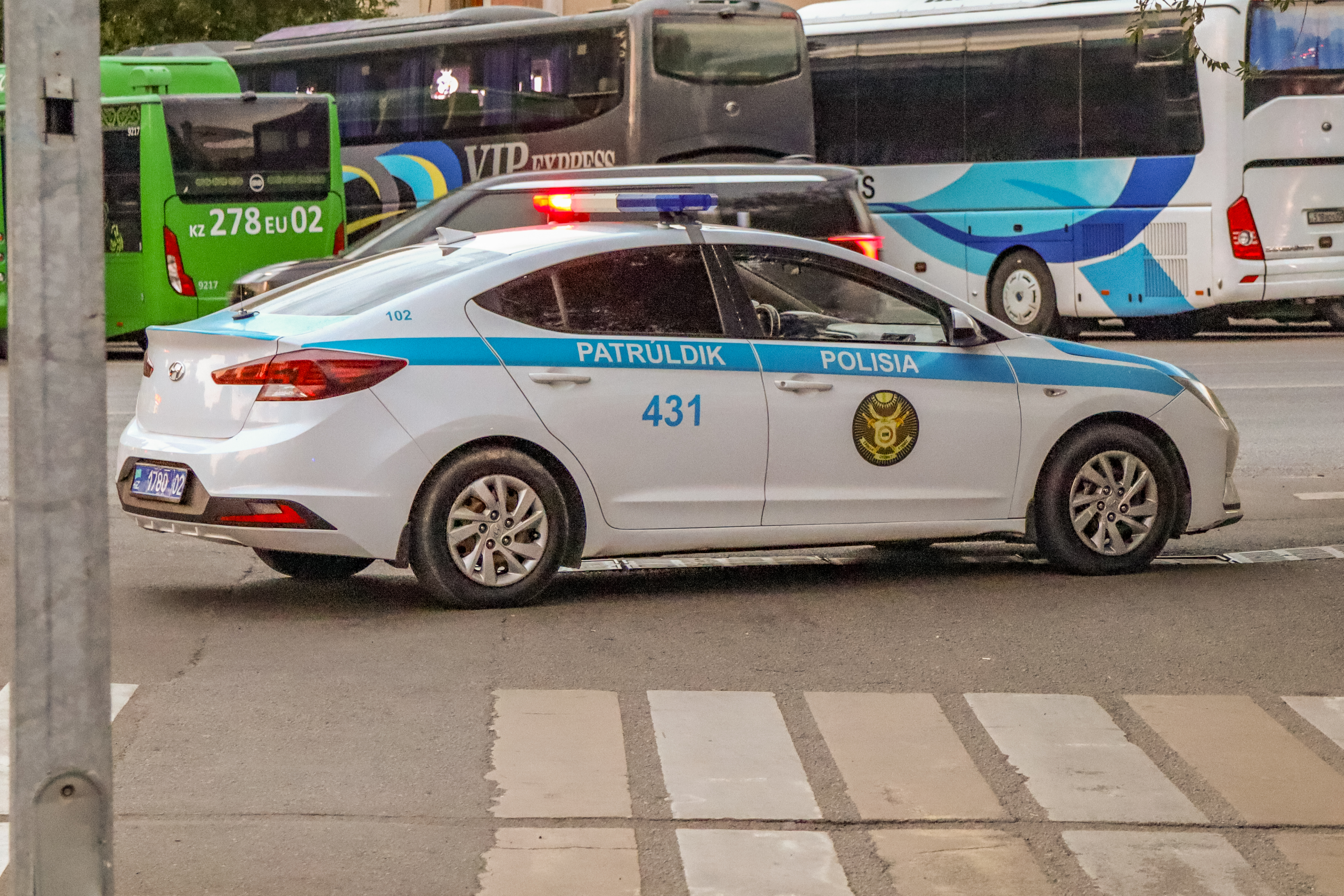
Police patrol car in Almaty, Kazakhstan

Law enforcement in Kazakhstan is handled by the Kazakhstan Police (Kazakh: Қазақстан полициясы, romanized: Qazaqstan polisiasy, [qɑzɑqsˈtʰɑn pɐˈlʲit͡sɨjəsɯ]) and law courts, largely unchanged from the era of Soviet control, and is shared between the country's National Security Committee, Ministry of Internal Affairs and the Office of the Procurator General.

== Organisation ==
The police force itself comes under the jurisdiction of the Ministry of Internal Affairs, whereas the National Security Committee and the Procurator General's office are responsibly for intelligence gathering and investigation respectively. From 1992 Kazakhstan became a member of INTERPOL. Its law enforcement agencies are closely tied with those of Russia, Mongolia, Uzbekistan, Tajikistan, and Kyrgyzstan.

The court system in Kazakhstan operates at three levels, local, province, and supreme court, and operates under a system of guaranteed legal representation (similar to that of the United States of America).

== Human rights allegations ==
The website of the US Embassy in Kazakhstan notes that in 2004-2005 the Kazakhstan government's human-rights record "remained poor," and "the Government continued to commit numerous abuses." Observer group Freedom House ranks this former Soviet state with a 6 in Political Rights and a 5 in Civil Liberties (scale of 1–7; 1 is the highest), denoting it as "Not Free." Political expression was reported to be restricted in Kazakhstan in the months leading up to presidential elections in December, according to observers, including Human Rights Watch and Freedom House.

The CIA world fact book cites that out of 76,000 prisoners interred in Kazakhstan prisons, 1,300 died of tuberculosis in 1995, and the prisons themselves suffer from overcrowding and staff shortages. In 2000s, the authorities made a conscious effort to reduce prison population, and achieved a significant decline of prisoners and those held in pre-trial detention. While the government funding for the prison system is still seen to be inadequate, prison conditions have improved, and several outdated penitentiaries have been closed.

== Crime rates ==
Crime in Kazakhstan
- Homicide: 2.6 (2022)
- Assault: 11.0 (2017)
- Burglary: 340.8 (2011)
- Theft: 1155.2 (2015)
- Corruption: 11.3 (2020)
- Bribery: 6.3 (2020)
- Rape: 7.1 (2017)
- Sexual violence: 11.4 (2017)
- reported per 100,000 inhabitants

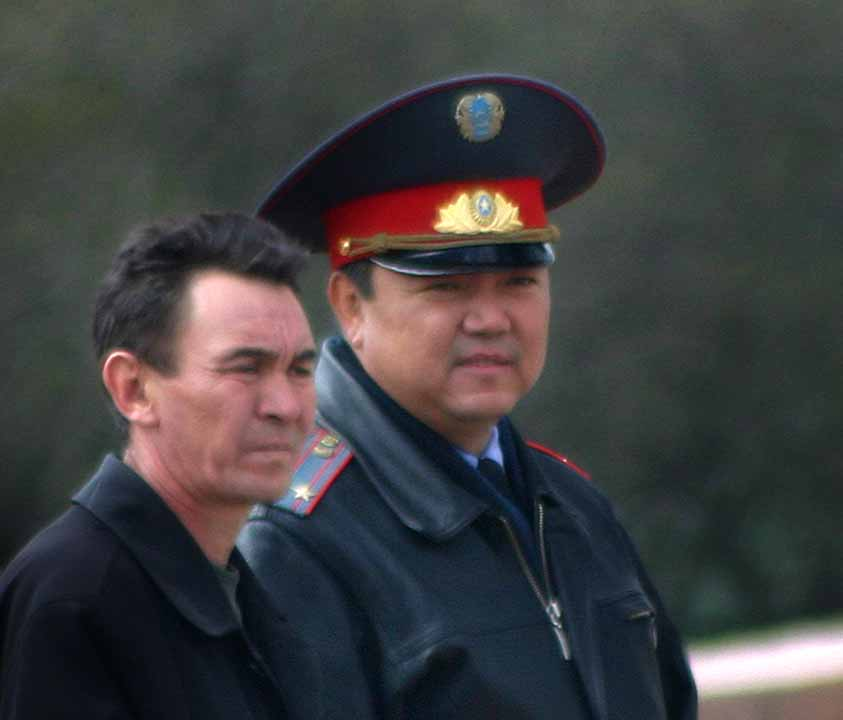
A Kazakh policeman (right) and civilian stand, 2005

Kazakhstan has suffered from growing crime rates in the 1990s, with a rate of 50 crimes per 10,000 population being cited, most commonly violent crime and possession/distribution of narcotics, (cannabis and opium in particular, it was estimated that there are 1,380 km^{2} of cannabis plantation). The 2018 International Crime Victims Survey showed low crime rates in the country. The police are also reportedly underfunded. In 2018, the ministry of Interior reported the number of Policemen to be 424 policemen per 100,000 citizens, with an average salary of 300 US dollars, which puts the total number at approximately 80,000 policemen.
