= Bayserke =

Baiserke Байсерке
- Location in Kazakhstan
- Coordinates: 43°28′47″N 77°2′1″E
- Country: Kazakhstan
- Region: Almaty Region
- District: Sarkand District

Population
  - Total: 26,338
- 2021 census
- Time zone: UTC+6 (Almaty time)

Baiserke is a village in Almaty Region of south-eastern Kazakhstan.
