= Ministry of Internal Affairs (Kazakhstan) =

Government ministry of Kazakhstan

Ministry of Internal Affairs of the Republic of Kazakhstan
- Қазақстан Республикасының Ішкі істер министрлігі (Kazakh); Министерство внутренних дел Республики Казахстан (Russian)
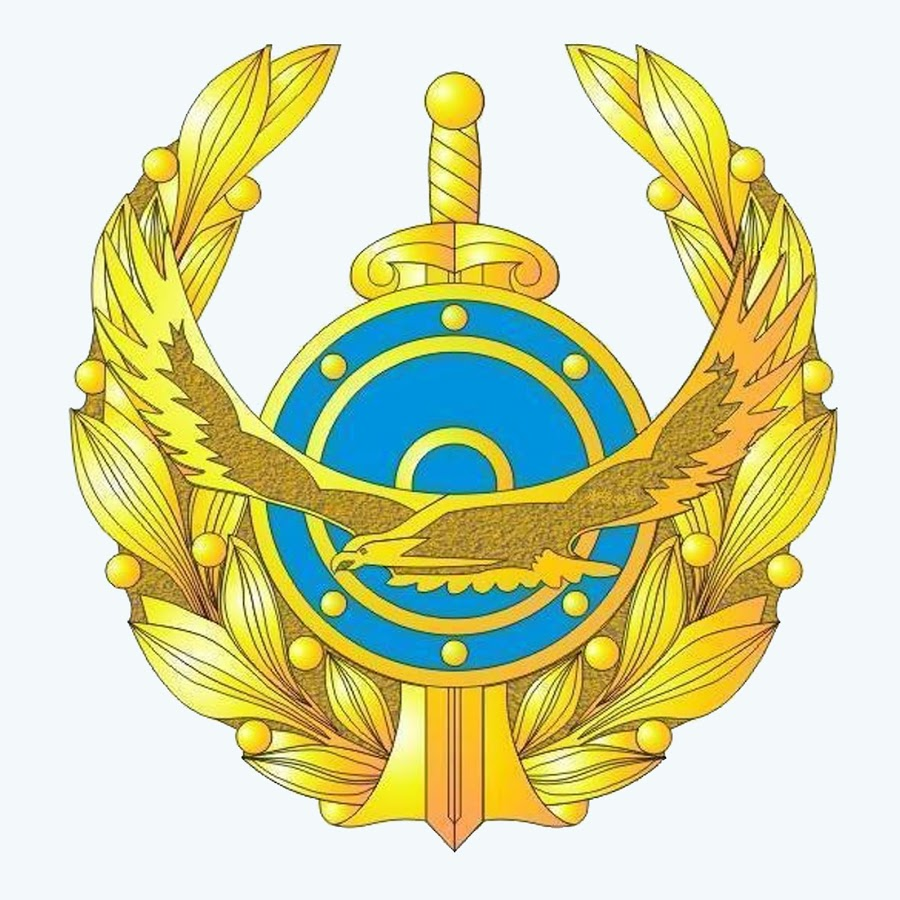

Agency overview
- Formed: 23 June 1992
- Preceding agency: Ministry of Internal Affairs of the Kazakh SSR
- Jurisdiction: Kazakhstan
- Headquarters: Astana
- Minister responsible: Erjan Sädenov
- Parent department: Government of Kazakhstan
- Child agency: National Guard of Kazakhstan
- Website: www.mvd.gov.kz

The Ministry of Internal Affairs of the Republic of Kazakhstan (MIA RK) (Note: Kazakh: Қазақстан Республикасының Ішкі істер министрлігі, romanized: Qazaqstan Respublikasynyñ Işkı ıster ministrlıgı, pronounced [qʰɑzɑqstʰɑ́n rʲɪspúblʲɪkəsənə́ŋ (ɘ)ʃkʰɘ́ (ɘ)stʰʲér mʲɪníst(ə)rlɘɣɘ́]; Russian: Министерство внутренних дел Республики Казахстан, romanized: Ministerstvo vnutrennikh del Respubliki Kazakhstan, pronounced [mʲɪnʲɪˈsʲtʲerstvə ˈvnutrʲɪnʲ(ː)ɪɣ dʲel rʲɪˈspublʲɪkʲɪ kəzɐxˈstan]) is the Kazakh government ministry which oversees the police and the National Guard (formerly the Internal Troops) of Kazakhstan. The Ministry is headed by the Minister of Internal Affairs of the Republic of Kazakhstan, appointed by the decree of the President of Kazakhstan. The Minister of Internal Affairs has 5 deputies, including the First Deputy Minister.

The residence of the minister and all senior leadership of the ministry, as well as all committees and departments are located in Astana.

== History ==
The cloth badge of a Internal Affairs Ministry worker

After the dissolution of the Soviet Union, there was a rapid increase in crime. Regional centers and large industrial cities with the most complex operational environment were under the special control of the Ministry of Internal Affairs. On 23 June 1992, the Law "On the Internal Affairs Bodies of the Republic of Kazakhstan" was adopted, which became the first act that defined the tasks and functions of the Internal Affairs Bodies of the country. In October 1995, at the suggestion of foreign consultants, the Ministry of Internal Affairs of the republic was reformed through the creation of the State Investigative Committee, a separate body to which the rights and functions of carrying out inquiry, investigation and operational search activities were given. The activities of the Investigative Committee had a negative impact on the crime situation in the country, which resulted in its disbandment in November 1997. In 1998, the police in Kazakhstan was formed. In 2002, the Ministry of Internal Affairs carried out a new reform, with the penitentiary system being transferred from the jurisdiction of the Ministry of Internal Affairs to the Ministry of Justice. In November 2010, the number of employees of internal affairs bodies was reduced by 15%, primarily affecting the regions and districts. In 2010, medical sobering-up centers of the Ministry of Internal Affairs were transferred to the Ministry of Health. In 2011, the functions of documenting and registering the population were given to the Ministry of Internal Affairs from the Ministry of Justice due to the worsening situation in this area. In 2013, the merging the functions of the road and patrol police took place. In 2014, the Ministry of Emergency Situations was abolished and was transferred to the Ministry of Internal Affairs. In 2016, the structure of the territorial Internal Affairs Agencies (DIA) of the Ministry of Internal Affairs was fragmented, resulting in the creation of a local police service, transferred to the subordination and management of exclusively local akims (mayors) of cities and regions.

== Structure ==
=== Committees and departments ===
- Committee of the Penal System;
- Administrative Police Committee;
- Migration Service Committee;
- Committee for Emergency Situations of the Ministry of Internal Affairs (2014—2020);
- Investigation Department;
- Criminal Police Committee;
- Logistics Department;
- Headquarters Department;
- Committee on the Control of Drug Trafficking and Drug Control;
- Road Police Committee;
- Operational and Criminalistics Department;
- Department for Countering Extremism;
- Department for Combating Organized Crime;
- Department of Special Training;
- Department of Internal Security;
- Department of Operational Planning;
- Department of Technical Service;
- Information and Analytical Center;
- Legal Department;
- Internal Audit Department;
- Department of Financial Support;
- Personnel Department;
- Department of State Language and Information.

=== Directorates ===
- Management;
- Office "A";
- National Central Bureau of Interpol (as management);
- Information and analytical center;
- Second special management;
- State institutions subordinate to the Ministry in the form of Republican State Enterprises;
- Joint Stock Companies;
- Limited Liability Partnerships.

In the structure of the Ministry of Internal Affairs there are 246 territorial divisions, including 16 departments (DIA) at the regional level, including the capital and city of republican subordination, 43 internal affairs departments at the level of urban districts.

=== Command ===
- High Command of the National Guard;
- Committee of the Penitentiary System;
- Administrative Police Committee.

== Subordinates ==
The Ministry subordinates include the following:

- National Guard of Kazakhstan;
- Central Hospital;
- Dog Training Center;
- Yuzhnaya and Severnaya Military and Special Supply Base;
- Motor Transport Service Institution;
- Sunkar Special Purpose Detachment;
- Arlan Special Purpose Unit;
- Department of the Specialized Security Service (Nur-Sultan);
- Diplomatic Protection Police Regiment;
- Police Regiment for the Protection of Government Agencies;
- Department of Specialized Security Service.

=== Sunkar Detachment ===
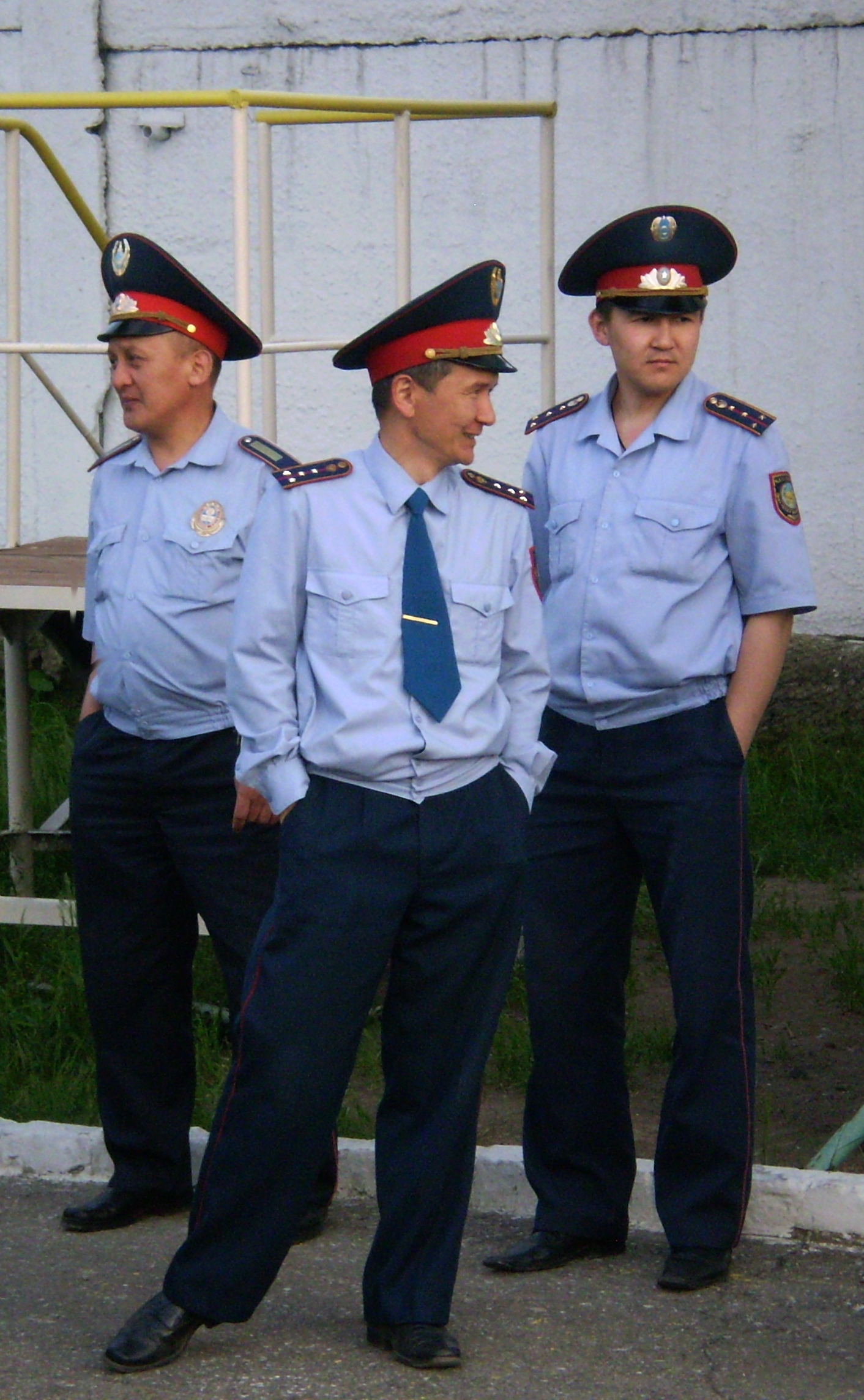
Kazakhstani policeman

The Special Purpose "Sunkar" (Kazakh: Сұңқар - Сокол) Detachment of the Ministry of Internal Affairs serves as the special forces for the law enforcement bodies of Kazakhstan. It was founded on 11 May 1998. The main combat missions of the unit are to capture and destroy of especially dangerous armed criminals and conduct special operations to free hostages and facilities of strategic importance. In 2003, the collegium of the Ministry of Internal Affairs decided to use "Sunkar" exclusively for the most difficult tasks that could entail significant losses of personnel. Their headquarters is located in Almaty and it has 5 regional offices throughout Kazakhstan. Structurally, the unit is a special-purpose company with a total number of just over 100 people. The training system is in many ways similar to the Russian Vityaz. In 2004, the unit was commanded by Colonel Alexander Yuriev. The current commander is Colonel Dulat Kurmashev.

== Academies ==
- Almaty Academy of the Ministry of Internal Affairs;
- Karaganda Academy of the Ministry of Internal Affairs;
- Kostanai Academy of the Ministry of Internal Affairs;
- Military Institute of the National Guard;
- Aktobe Law Institute.

=== Almaty Academy ===
The Academy of the Ministry of Internal Affairs of the Republic of Kazakhstan was established on 1 July 1999 on the basis of the Almaty Legal and Almaty Technical Institutes of the MVD. The birthday of the Almaty Academy is 23 July 1956, when the Almaty Secondary Special Police School was established. In 2002, three institutes were established at the academy: an institute for training the leadership of the internal affairs bodies, law institute based on secondary specialized education, and a research institute. After the reorganization of the Almaty Law College, the Special Faculty of the Law Institute of the academy was organized at the Academy of the Ministry of Internal Affairs. The special faculty was reorganized in September 2012 and the Technical Faculty of the Almaty Academy was established.

=== Karaganda Academy ===
The Karaganda Academy named after Barimbek Beisenov (formerly the Karaganda Higher School of the USSR Ministry of Internal Affairs) was founded in 1969 on the basis of the faculty of the Moscow Higher Police School of the Soviet MVD. By the decree of the government in 2001, the academy was named after Barimbek Sarsenovich Beisenov, the first head of this institution and one of the founders of the academy.

=== Military Institute of the National Guard ===
The Military Institute of the National Guard is the branch of the National Guard focused on education. It was founded as the Higher Military College of the Internal Troops by governmental decree on March 18, 1997. President Nazarbayev would present the school with its own ceremonial banner that December.

== List of ministers ==
=== Interior ministers of the Kazakh SSR ===
- Afanasy Pchelkin (July 9, 1946 — January 19, 1949);
- Ivan Ilyich Dolgikh (January 19, 1949 — January 31, 1951);
- Vladimir Gubin (February 16, 1951 — August 4, 1954);
- Shyrakbek Kabylbaev (August 10, 1954 — November 18, 1959);
- Mahmud Sapargaliev (1959 — May 1961);
- Dmitry Pankov (July 24, 1961 — April 1967) (as Minister of Public Order);
- Shyrakbek Kabylbaev (1967 — 1973);
- Makan Esbulatov (November 1973 — 1980);
- Andrey Plataev (1980 — 1986);
- Grigory Knyazev (1986 — 1990).
- Mikhail Bersenyov (April 1990 — April 1992)

=== Since independence ===
The country proclaimed full independence on 16 December 1991.

- Mikhail Bersenyov (April 1990 — April 1992)
- Vladimir Shumov (April 1992 — September 1994)
- Bulat Baekenov (October 1994 — November 1995);
- Kairbek Suleimenov (November 1995 — December 2000);
- Bolat Iskakov (December 2000 — January 2002);
- Kairbek Suleimenov (January 2002 — September 12, 2003);
- Zautbek Turisbekov (12 September 2003 — 14 October 2005);
- Bauyrzhan Mukhamedzhanov (14 October 2005 — 2 April 2009);
- Serik Baimaganbetov (2 April 2009 — 11 April 2011);
- Kalmukhanbet Kassymov (11 April 2011 — 12 February 2019);
- Erlan Turgymbaev (12 February 2019 — 16 April 2022).
- Marat Akhmetzhanov (16 April 2022 — 2 September 2023).
- Yerzhan Sadenov (Since 2 September 2023).

== Awards ==
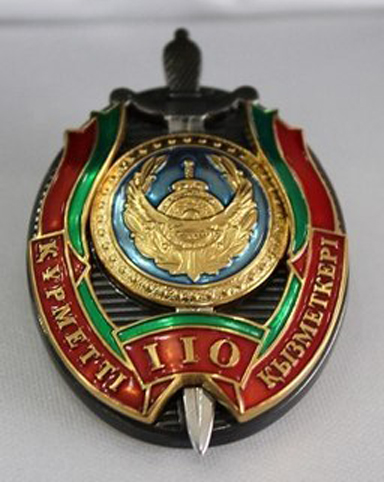
Honorary Worker of the internal affairs bodies

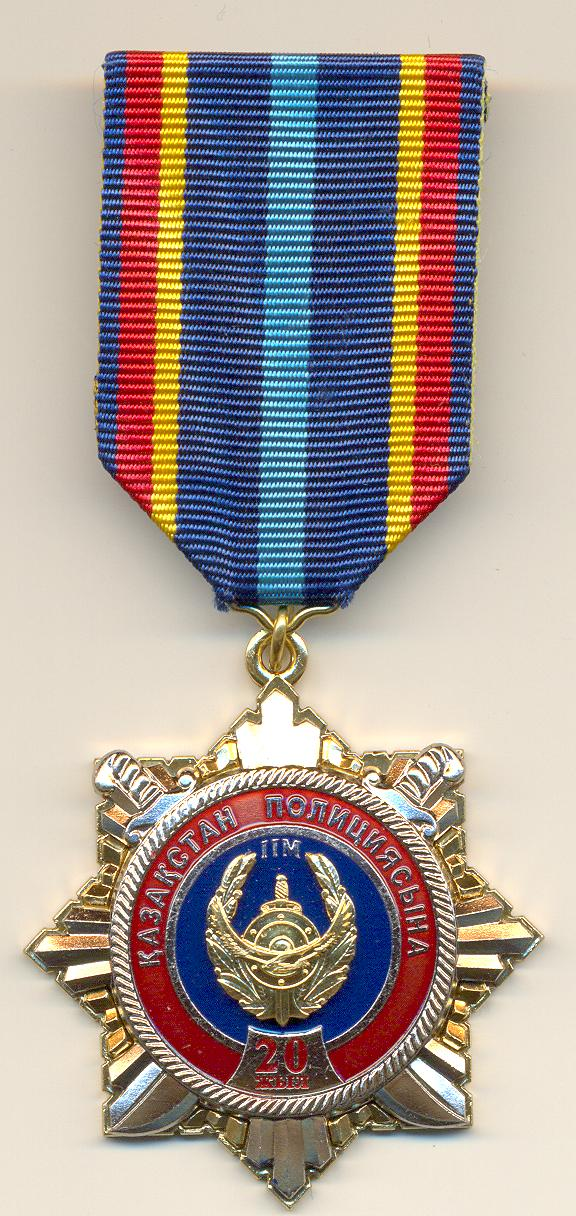
Medal of Republic Kazakhstan "20 years of Police of the Republic Kazakhstan"

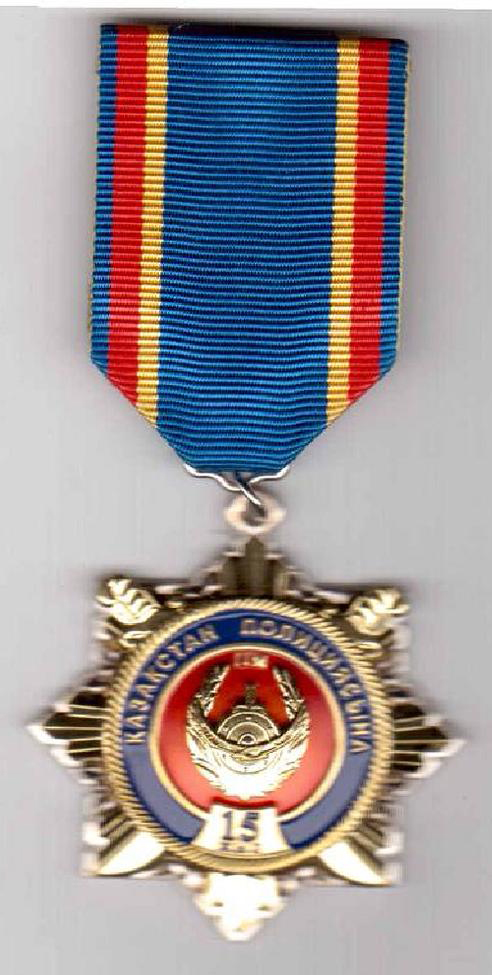
Medal of Republic Kazakhstan "15 years of Police of the Republic Kazakhstan"

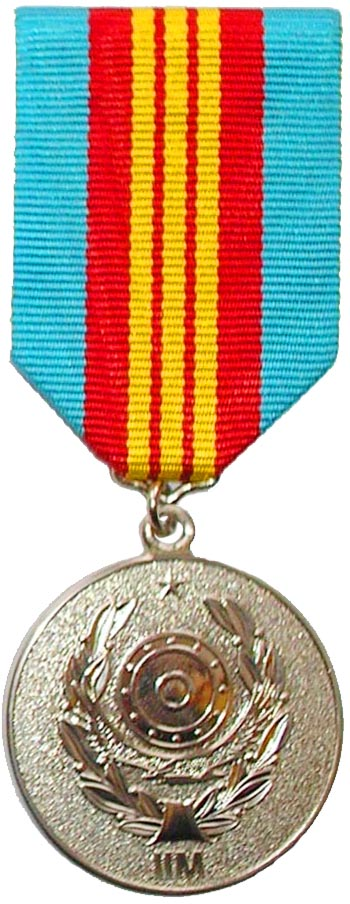
Medal "10 years of the MVD"

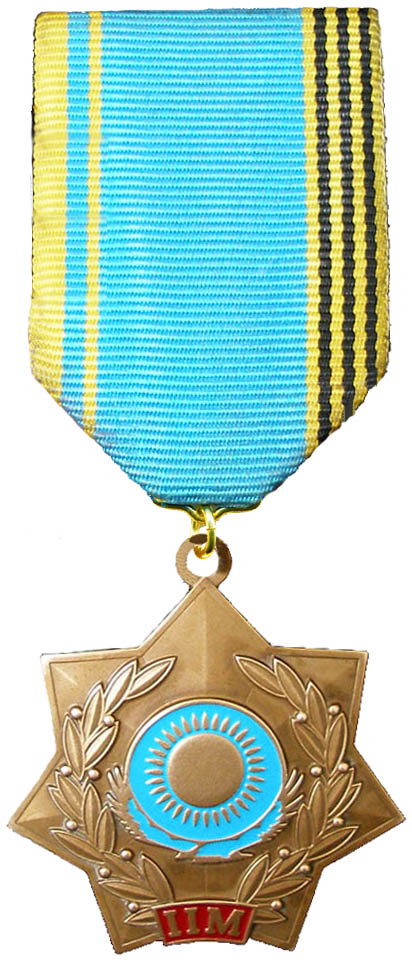
Medal "Veteran of the MVD"

== See also ==
- Law enforcement in Kazakhstan
- Ministry of Internal Affairs (Russia)
- Ministry of Justice and Internal Affairs (Mongolia)
- Ministry of Civil Affairs (China)
- Ministry of Public Security (China)
- Ministry of the Interior (Kyrgyzstan)
- Ministry of Internal Affairs (Tajikistan)
- Ministry of Internal Affairs (Uzbekistan)
- Ministry of Internal Affairs (Turkmenistan)
- Ministry of Internal Affairs (Azerbaijan)
