= Kurshim District =

Coordinates: 48°34′03″N 83°39′54″E

Kurshim Күршім
- District
- Күршім ауданы
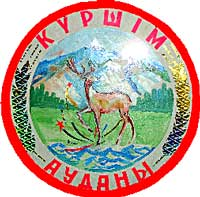
- Coat of arms

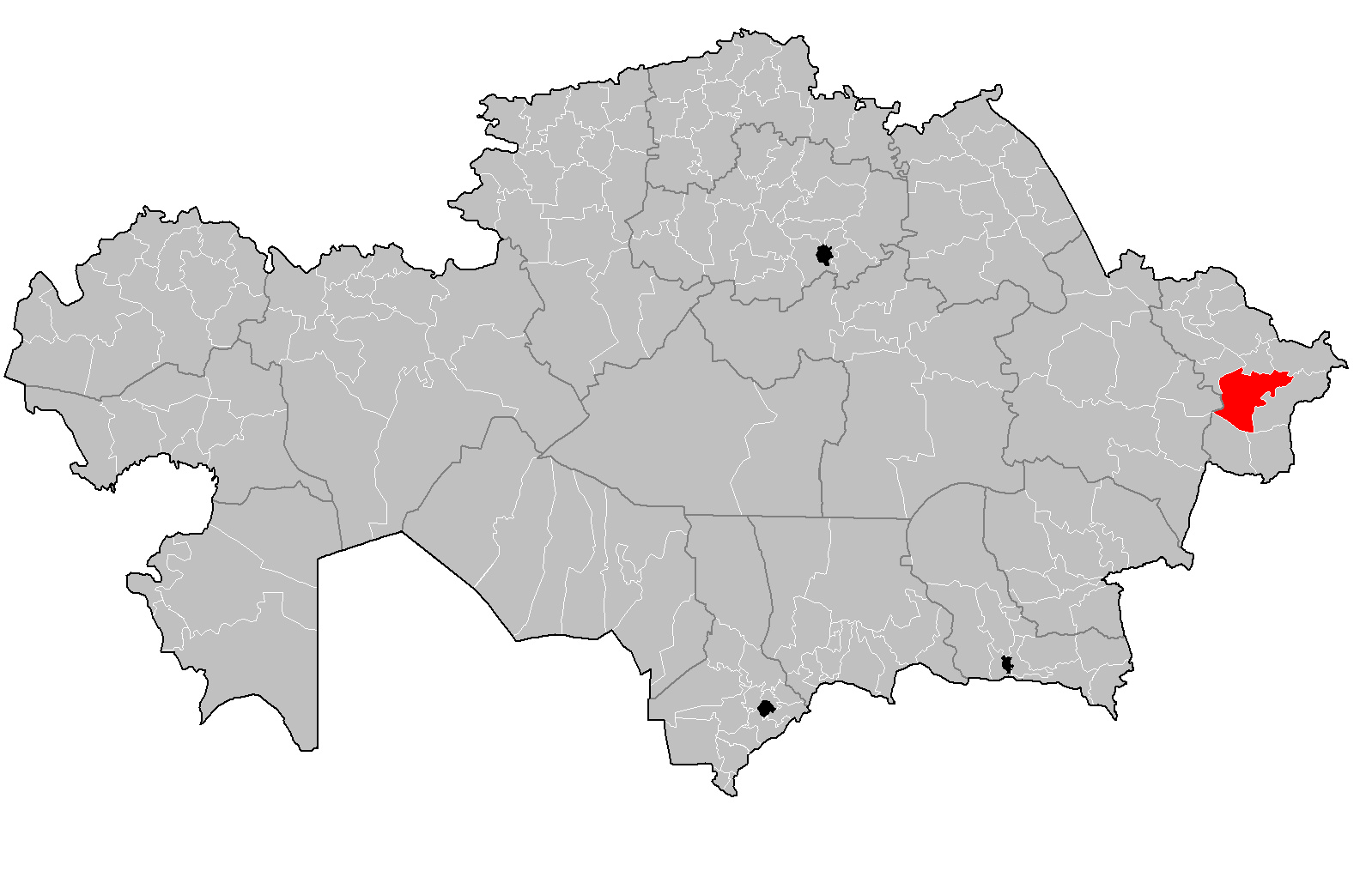
- Country: Kazakhstan
- Region: East Kazakhstan Region
- Administrative center: Kurshim
- Founded: 1927

Government
  - Akim: Kazhanov Dulat Zaisanbekovich

Area
  - Total: 9,000 sq mi (23,200 km^{2})

Population (2013)
  - Total: 29,476
- Time zone: UTC+6 (East)

Kurchum (Kazakh: Күршім ауданы, Kürşım audany) is a district of East Kazakhstan Region in eastern Kazakhstan. The administrative center of the district is the selo of Kurshim. Population: 29,476 (2013 estimate); 31,967 (2009 census results); 45,057 (1999 census results).
