= Medal "10 Years of Independence of the Republic of Kazakhstan" =

State award of the Republic of Kazakhstan

Jubilee Medal "10 Years of Independence of the Republic of Kazakhstan"
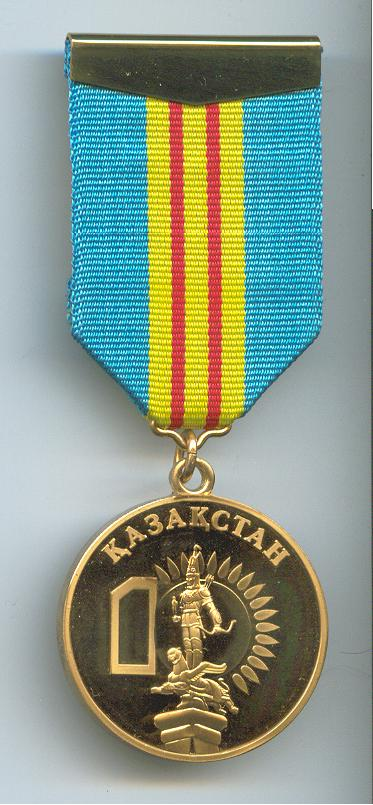
- Medal "10 Years of Independence of the Republic of Kazakhstan" (obverse)
- Awarded for: Significant contribution to the formation of statehood, strengthening sovereignty and socio-economic development of the Republic of Kazakhstan
- Presented by: Kazakhstan
- Eligibility: Kazakh nationals and foreign nationals
- Established: 27 August 2001
- Ribbon of the Medal "10 Years of Independence of the Republic of Kazakhstan"

Precedence
- Next (higher): Medal of Shapagat
- Next (lower): Medal "10 Years of the Armed Forces of the Republic of Kazakhstan"

Jubilee Medal "10 Years of Independence of the Republic of Kazakhstan" (Kazakh: «Қазақстан Республикасының тәуелсіздігіне 10 жыл» мерекелік медалі; Russian: Юбилейная медаль «10 лет независимости Республики Казахстан») is a state decoration of the Republic of Kazakhstan. It was established by Presidential Decree on 27 August 2001.

The medal was instituted to commemorate the tenth anniversary of Kazakhstan's independence.

== History ==
On the eve of the 10th anniversary of the independence of Kazakhstan, the state instituted a commemorative medal to mark the occasion. The award was established by a Decree No. 675 of the president Nursultan Nazarbayev dated 27 August 2001.

The medal was made at the Kazakhstan Mint in Oskemen.

== Award statute ==
The medal is awarded to citizens of the Republic of Kazakhstan and foreign citizens who have made a significant contribution to the formation of statehood, strengthening sovereignty and socio-economic development of the Republic of Kazakhstan.

== Award description ==
The medal "10th Anniversary of the Republic of Kazakhstan" is made of tombak alloy and has the shape of a circle with a diameter of 34 mm.

On the obverse of the medal in the center, against the background of the stylized number 10 consisting of one and the sun with divergent rays, there is an image of the head fragment of the Monument of Independence of the Republic of Kazakhstan in the city of Almaty (a Saka warrior standing on a leopard).

In the upper part of the medal there is an inscription "KAZAKHSTAN" (Kazakh: «ҚАЗАҚСТАН»).

On the reverse of the medal in there are two inscriptions of "10 Years of Independence of the Republic of Kazakhstan" in the upper and lower part written in Kazakh and Russian languages. The inscriptions are separated by an element of national ornament.

The medal is connected with an eyelet and a ring to a hexagonal brass bar 50 mm high and 34 mm wide, covered with a moire ribbon of the color of the State Flag of the Republic of Kazakhstan (blue) with three yellow and two red alternating stripes. In the upper part of the block there is a pentagonal metal overlay, in the lower part there is a curly bracket.

== See also ==
- Medal "10 years of Astana"
