= Talgat Ermegiyaev =

Talgat Ermegiyayev Талгат Амангелдіұлы Ермегияев

Former Minister of Tourism and Sport. Removed in 2013
- Incumbent
- Assumed office 2011

Personal details
- Born: July 4, 1969 (age 56) Almaty, USSR

Talgat Amangeldiuly Ermegiyayev (Kazakh: Талгат Амангелдіұлы Ермегияев, Talgat Amangeldıūly Ermegiiaev) was the Chairman of the now-defunct Kazakhstan Agency of Sport and Physical Culture.

On January 24, 2012 Ermegiyayev was appointed Chairman of the Agency of Sport and Physical Culture. On January 16, 2013, Ermegiyaev was appointed Chairman of the Board of the Astana EXPO-2017 National Company.
