= List of universities in Kazakhstan =

The following is a list of universities in Kazakhstan by cities:

== Aktau ==
- Sh. Yesenov - Caspian State University of Technology and Engineering

== Aktobe ==
- Aktobe State Pedagogical Institute
- K. Zhubanov Aktobe State University
- Kazakh-Russian International University
- M. Ospanov West Kazakhstan State Medical Academy

== Almaty ==
- Abai Kazakh National Pedagogical University
- Adilet Law Academy
- Al-Farabi Kazakh National University
- Almaty Management University
- Almaty Technological University
- Almaty University of Power Engineering and Telecommunications
- Kazakh National Medical University
- Central Asian University
- German-Kazakh University
- International Information Technology University
- Kazakh Russian Medical University
- Kainar University
- Kazakh Ablai Khan University of International Relations and World Languages
- Kazakh Academy of Labour and Social Relations
- Kazakh Academy of Sports & Tourism
- Kazakh-American University
- Kazakh Automobile Road Institute
- Kazakh-British Technical University
- Kazakh Leading Academy of Architecture and Civil Engineering
- Kazakh National Agrarian University
- KIMEP University
- University of Foreign Languages and Business Career
- Kazakh National Conservatory
- M. Tynyshbayev Kazakh Academy of Transport & Communication
- Narxoz University
- Satbayev Kazakh National Technical University
- Suleyman Demirel University
- Kazakh National Academy of Arts
- Turan University
- University of Central Asia in Tekeli
- University of International Business
- De Montfort University Kazakhstan

== Atyrau ==
- Atyrau University
- Atyrau Institute of Oil and Gas

== Ekibastuz ==
- K.I.Satpayev Ekisbastuz Engineering & Technical Institute

== Karaganda ==
- Karagandy State University
- Karaganda State Medical University (Karagandy State Medical Academy)
- Karagandy State Technical University
- Central Kazakhstan Academy
- Karaganda Economic University

== Kokshetau ==
- Kokshetau State University (which is named after Shokan Ualikhanov)

== Kostanay ==
- A. Baitursynov Kostanay State University
- Kostanay State Pedagogical Institute

== Kyzylorda ==
- Korkyt Ata Kyzylorda State University

== Astana ==
- Maksut Narikbaev University (KAZGUU)
- Astana Medical University
- Akmola State Medical Academy
- Kazakh National Academy of Music
- L.N.Gumilyov Eurasian National University
- Nazarbayev University
- S. Seifullin Kazakh Agrotechnical University
- JSC "Financial Academy"
- "Shabyt" Kazakh National University of the Arts
- Kazakh University of Economics, Finance and International Trade
- Astana IT University (AITU)

== Oral ==
- West Kazakhstan State University
- West Kazakhstan Humanitarian Academy
- Zhangir-Khan West Kazakhstan Agricultural & Technical University

== Oskemen ==
- D. Serikbayev East Kazakhstan Technical University
- East Kazakhstan Regional University
- Kazakh-American Free University
- Sarsen Amanzholov East Kazakhstan State University

== Pavlodar ==
- Innovative University of Eurasia
- Pavlodar State Pedagogical Institute
- Pavlodar State University S. Toraigyrov

== Petropavl ==
- North Kazakhstan State University

== Rudni ==
- Rudniy Industrial Institute

== Semey ==
- Kazakh Finance Economical Institute
- Semey State Medical Academy
- Semey State Pedagogical Institute
- Shakerim Semey State University

== Shymkent ==
- Kazakhstan University of People's Friendship
- Auezov South Kazakhstan State University
- M. Saparbayev South Kazakhstan Humanitarian Institute
- South Kazakhstan State Medical Academy
- Shymkent University

== Taraz ==
- Taraz State Pedagogical Institute
- Taraz State University M.H.Dulati
- Jambyl Hydromelioration and Construction Institute
- Jambyl of Humanities and Technique

== Tekeli ==
- University of Central Asia

== Turkistan ==
- Ahmet Yesevi Üniversitesi

== Zhezkazgan ==
- O.A. Baikonurov Zhezkazgan University
