= Second Daniyal Akhmetov Government =

Government of Kazakhstan

- 8th Cabinet of Kazakhstan
- 2006–2007
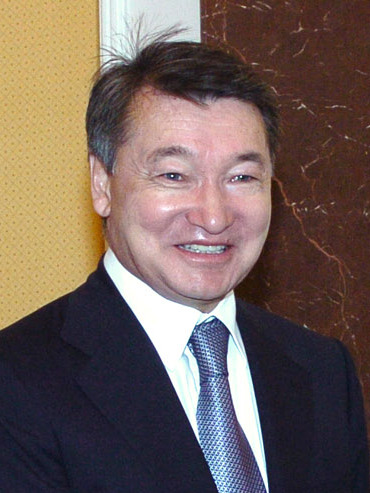
- Date formed: 18 January 2006
- Date dissolved: 8 January 2007

People and organisations
- Head of state: Nursultan Nazarbayev
- Head of government: Daniyal Akhmetov
- Deputy head of government: Byrganym Aitimova; Karim Massimov
- Member party: Nur Otan
- Status in legislature: Majority

History
- Predecessor: Akhmetov I
- Successor: Massimov I

The Second Daniyal Akhmetov Government (Kazakh: Екінші Даниял Ахметов үкіметі, romanized: Ekınşı Daniyal Ahmetov ükımetı; Russian: Второе правительство Данияла Ахметова) was the 8th government in Kazakhstan led by Prime Minister Daniyal Akhmetov.

Following the 2005 presidential election, Akhmetov resigned on 18 January 2006 and was reappointed by President Nursultan Nazarbayev, who expressed confidence in his leadership. On the same day, the Parliament approved Akhmetov's reappointment as prime minister. The newly composed government was confirmed the following day, on 19 January, with most ministers retaining their positions, ensuring continuity in governance as Kazakhstan continued its social and economic development.

Akhmetov continued leading the cabinet until his resignation on 8 January 2007 without a full explanation to which political analysts believed that it was due Nazarbayev's constant criticism of his administrative oversight of the economy. Following the 2007 political shakeup, Akhmetov was appointed as the minister of defense by President Nazarbayev on 10 January and continued to work under Massimov's government until June 2009.

== Composition ==
Functions	Holder	Start	End
Prime Minister	Daniyal Akhmetov	18 January 2006	8 January 2007
Deputy Prime Minister	Karim Massimov	18 January 2006	10 January 2007
Prime Minister's Office	Altai Tleuberdin	13 December 2000	10 January 2007
Ministry of Foreign Affairs	Kassym-Jomart Tokayev	29 January 2002	11 January 2007
Ministry of Defense	Mukhtar Altynbayev	8 December 2001	10 January 2007
Ministry of Emergency Situations	Shalbay Kulmakhanov	19 January 2006	11 January 2007
Ministry of Internal Affairs	Bauyrzhan Mukhamedzhanov	19 January 2006	2 April 2009
Ministry of Agriculture	Akhmetzhan Yessimov	19 January 2006	14 April 2008
Ministry of Justice	Rashid Tusupbekov	19 January 2006	2 April 2009
Ministry of Education and Science	Byrganym Aitimova	19 January 2006	19 January 2007
Ministry of Healthcare	Erbolat Dosaev	19 January 2006	20 September 2006
Ministry of Healthcare	Anatoly Dernovoi	20 September 2006	20 November 2008
Ministry of Labour and Social Protection of the Population	Gulzhan Karagusova	19 January 2006	12 July 2007
Ministry of Transport and Communications	Askar Mamin	19 January 2006	21 September 2006
Ministry of Transport and Communications	Serik Akhmetov	25 September 2006	3 March 2009
Ministry of Industry and Trade	Sauat Mynbayev	19 January 2006	19 February 2008
Ministry of Industry and Trade	Vladimir Shkolnik	19 January 2006	12 January 2007
Ministry of Culture, Information and Public Accord	Mukhtar Kul-Mukhammed	4 May 2001	13 September 2003
Ministry of Information	Altynbek Sarsenbayuly	12 July 2004	29 September 2004
Ministry of Culture, Information and Sports	Esetjan Kosubaev	29 September 2004	18 January 2006
Ministry of Culture, Information and Sports	Ermukhamet Ertysbayev	18 January 2006	28 March 2006
Ministry of Culture and Information	Ermukhamet Ertysbayev	23 March 2006	12 May 2008
Ministry of Tourism and Sports	Temirkhan Dosmukhanbetov	28 March 2006	8 April 2011
Ministry of Finance	Erbolat Dosaev	June 2003	5 April 2004
Ministry of Finance	Arman Dunayev	5 April 2004	19 January 2006
Ministry of Finance	Natalya Korzhova	19 January 2006	14 November 2007
Ministry of Economy and Budget Planning	Kairat Kelimbetov	28 August 2002	18 April 2006
Ministry of Economy and Budget Planning	Karim Massimov	20 April 2006	13 October 2006
Ministry of Economy and Budget Planning	Aslan Musin	4 October 2006	10 August 2007
Ministry of Environmental Protection	Aitkul Samakova	29 August 2002	1 February 2006
Ministry of Environmental Protection	Kamaltin Mukhamedzhanov	19 January 2006	28 March 2006
Ministry of Environmental Protection	Nurlan Iskakov	3 April 2006	4 March 2009
