= First Daniyal Akhmetov Government =

Government of Kazakhstan

- 7th Cabinet of Kazakhstan
- 2003–2006
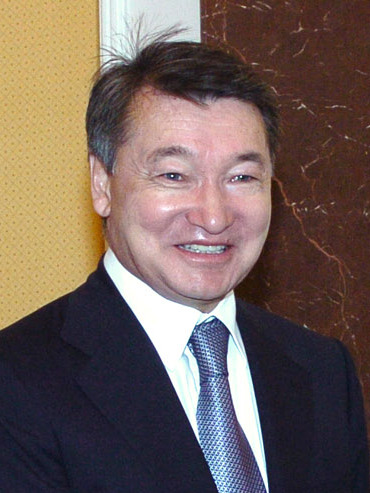
- Date formed: 13 June 2003
- Date dissolved: 18 January 2006

People and organisations
- Head of state: Nursultan Nazarbayev
- Head of government: Daniyal Akhmetov
- Deputy head of government: Aleksandr Pavlov (First Deputy); Grigori Marchenko (First Deputy); Akhmetzhan Yessimov; Byrganym Aitimova; Karim Massimov
- Member party: Otan; Aq Jol
- Status in legislature: Majority

History
- Predecessor: Tasmagambetov
- Successor: Akhmetov II

The First Daniyal Akhmetov Government (Kazakh: Даниял Ахметов Үкіметі, romanized: Danial Ahmetov Ükımetı; Russian: Правительство Данияла Ахметова) was the 7th government in Kazakhstan, led by Prime Minister Daniyal Akhmetov. President Nursultan Nazarbayev nominated Akhmetov at a joint session of the Parliament to be Prime Minister on 13 June 2003, emphasizing that the country needed a government led by someone with significant regional governing experience. Nazarbayev highlighted Akhmetov’s tenure as the akim of Pavlodar Region as a reason for his selection, aiming to accelerate the pace of social and economic development. Akhmetov was approved by a wide margin, with 73 out of 77 deputies from the Mäjilis and 36 out of 39 deputies from the Senate supporting his appointment.

Following the 2005 presidential election, Akhmetov resigned on 18 January 2006, but was reappointed shortly afterward by President Nazarbayev, forming a new government under his leadership.

== Composition ==
Functions	Holder	Start	End
Prime Minister	Daniyal Akhmetov	13 June 2003	18 January 2006
First Deputy Prime Minister	Aleksandr Pavlov	28 August 2002	6 January 2004
First Deputy Prime Minister	Grigori Marchenko	6 January 2004	14 April 2004
Deputy Prime Minister	Akhmetzhan Yessimov	28 May 2002	19 January 2006
Deputy Prime Minister	Sauat Mynbayev	13 June 2003	31 January 2003
Deputy Prime Minister	Byrganym Aitimova	15 May 2004	13 December 2005
Prime Minister's Office	Altai Tleuberdin	13 December 2000	18 January 2006
Ministry of Foreign Affairs	Kassym-Jomart Tokayev	29 January 2002	18 January 2006
Ministry of Defense	Mukhtar Altynbayev	8 December 2001	18 January 2006
Ministry of Emergency Situations	Muhambet Kopeev	30 September 2004	11 August 2005
Ministry of Emergency Situations	Shalbay Kulmakhanov	11 August 2005	18 January 2006
Ministry of Internal Affairs	Kairbek Suleimenov	30 January 2002	12 September 2003
Ministry of Internal Affairs	Zautbek Turisbekov	12 September 2003	14 October 2005
Ministry of Internal Affairs	Bauyrzhan Mukhamedzhanov	14 October 2005	18 January 2006
Ministry of Agriculture	Akhmetzhan Yessimov	18 May 2001	14 May 2004
Ministry of Agriculture	Serik Umbetov	14 May 2004	11 August 2005
Ministry of Agriculture	Askar Myrzakhmetov	25 August 2005	18 January 2006
Ministry of Justice	Onalsyn Zhumabekov	25 February 2003	April 2005
Ministry of Justice	Rashid Tusupbekov	14 April 2005	18 January 2006
Ministry of Education and Science	Zhaksybek Kulekeyev	14 June 2003	14 December 2004
Ministry of Education and Science	Byrganym Aitimova	13 December 2004	18 January 2006
Ministry of Healthcare	Jaqsylyq Doskaliev	17 October 2001	4 April 2004
Ministry of Healthcare	Erbolat Dosaev	5 April 2004	18 January 2006
Ministry of Labour and Social Protection of the Population	Gulzhan Karagusova	22 November 2001	18 January 2006
Ministry of Transport and Communications	Qajymurat Nagymanov	18 May 2002	25 May 2005
Ministry of Transport and Communications	Askar Mamin	25 May 2005	18 January 2006
Ministry of Industry and Trade	Sauat Mynbayev	14 December 2004	18 January 2006
Ministry of Culture, Information and Public Accord	Mukhtar Kul-Mukhammed	4 May 2001	13 September 2003
Ministry of Information	Altynbek Sarsenbayuly	12 July 2004	29 September 2004
Ministry of Culture, Information and Sports	Esetjan Kosubaev	29 September 2004	18 January 2006
Ministry of Finance	Erbolat Dosaev	June 2003	5 April 2004
Ministry of Finance	Arman Dunayev	5 April 2004	18 January 2006
Ministry of Economy and Budget Planning	Kairat Kelimbetov	28 August 2002	18 January 2006
Ministry of Environmental Protection	Aitkul Samakova	29 August 2002	18 January 2006
