= Salidat Qaiyrbekova =

Kazakh politician (1961–2016)

- Салидат Қайырбекова

Minister of Healthcare
- In office 7 October 2010 – 6 August 2014
- President: Nursultan Nazarbayev
- Prime Minister: Karim Massimov; Serik Akhmetov
- Preceded by: Jaqsylyq Dosqaliev
- Succeeded by: Tamara Duisenova (Healthcare and Social Development)

Personal details
- Born: 1 August 1961 Karaganda Region, Kazakh SSR, Soviet Union
- Died: 3 July 2016 (aged 54) Astana, Kazakhstan
- Education: Karaganda State Medical University; Karagandy State University

Salidat Zekenqyzy Qaiyrbekova (Kazakh: Салидат Зекенқызы Қайырбекова, Salidat Zekenqyzy Qaiyrbekova; 1 August 1961 – 3 July 2016) was a Kazakh politician who served as a Minister of Healthcare from October 2010 to August 2014 and the chair of the Board of JSC National Medical Holding from October 2015 until her death.

== Biography ==
=== Early life and education ===
Qaiyrbekova was born in the Karaganda Region. In 1984, she graduated from the Karaganda State Medical University with a degree in general medicine. In 2004, she graduated from the Karagandy State University with a degree in jurisprudence.

=== Career ===
From 1984 to 1998 she worked as a neuropathologist in medical organizations, deputy chief physician of the Karaganda Regional Multidisciplinary Treatment and Diagnostic Association. From 1998 to 2001, she served as the head of the Department for Organizing Medical Care of the Karaganda Regional Health Department, chairman of the Medical and Social Expert Commission No. 5 of the Karaganda Regional Department of Labour, Employment and Social Protection of the Population.

In 2001, Qaiyrbekova became an applicant for the Department of Public Health and Healthcare Management of the Kazakh National Medical University. From 2001 to 2004. she was the head of the department, deputy director of the Department of Medical and Preventive Work, head of the Apparatus of the Ministry of Healthcare.

In 2004, Qaiyrbekova became a Vice Rector of the Kazakh National Medical University.

From 2006 to 2008, Qaiyrbekova served as a chief expert, chief inspector of the Department of Socio-Economic Analysis, head of the sector of the Department of Socio-Economic Monitoring of the Administration of the President. On 4 December 2008, she became the chair of the Committee for Monitoring the Provision of Medical Services of the Ministry of Healthcare and then on 5 November 2009 as the chair of the Medical Services Payment Committee.

On 23 April 2010, by the Decree of the President, she was appointed as First Vice Minister of Healthcare. Following a corruption scandal involving Jaqsylyq Dosqaliev, Qaiyrbekova was appointed as the Minister of Healthcare on 7 October 2010. She was relieved from the post after the Ministry was reorganized on 6 August 2014 and became the Vice Minister of Healthcare and Social Development on 13 August 2014.

On 13 October 2015, Qaiyrbekova became the head of JSC National Medical Holding.

=== Death ===
Qaiyrbekova unexpectedly died on 3 July 2016 at the age 54 in Astana after suffering a stroke.
