= Svetlana Jaqypova =

Kazakhstani politician (born 1968)

- Светлана Жақыпова
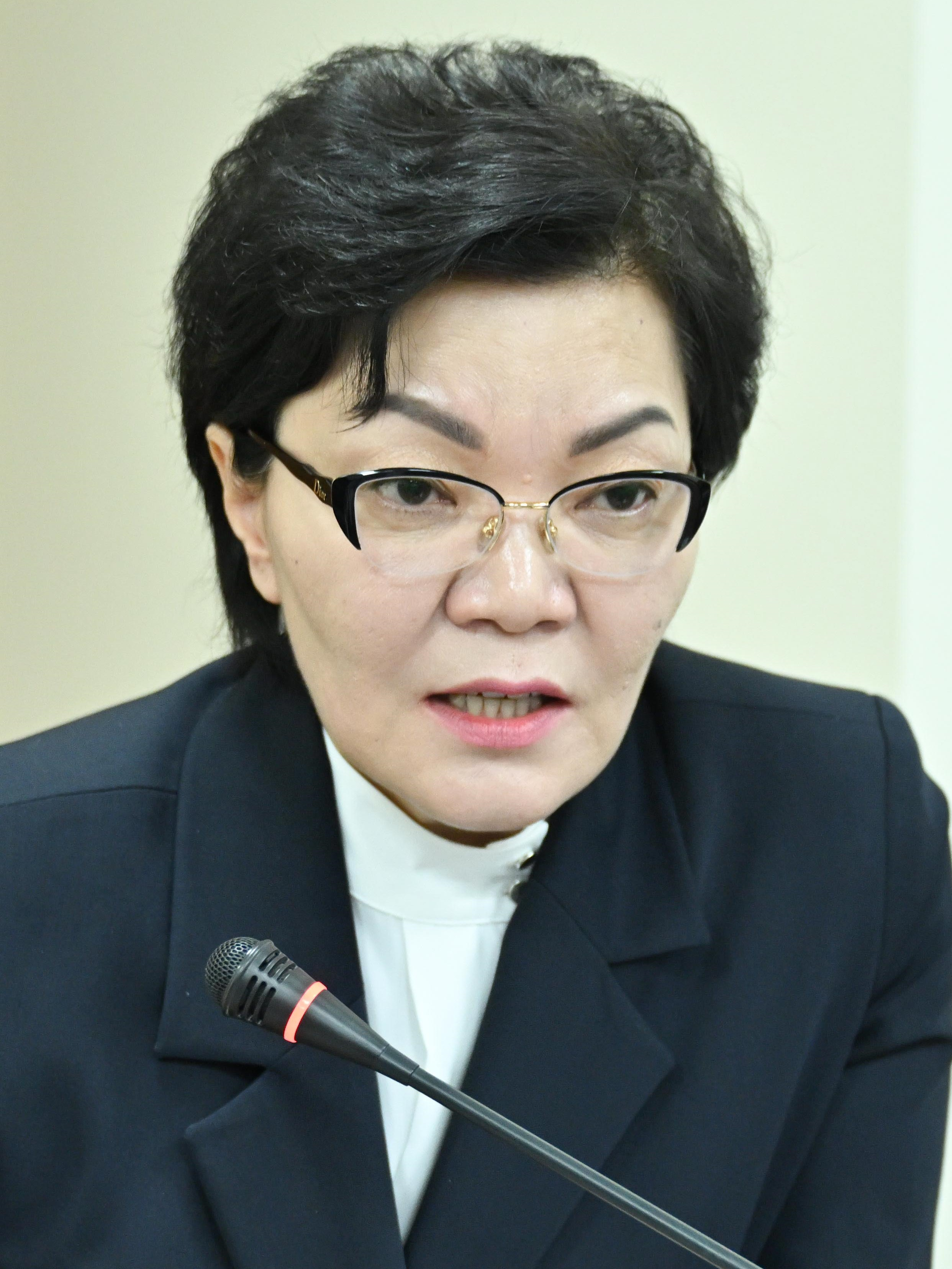
- Jaqypova in 2024

Minister of Labour and Social Protection of the Population of Kazakhstan
- In office 2 September 2023 – 27 January 2026
- President: Kassym-Jomart Tokayev
- Prime Minister: Älihan Smaiylov; Oljas Bektenov
- Preceded by: Tamara Duisenova
- Succeeded by: Asqarbek Ertaev

Commissioner for the Rights of Socially Vulnerable Categories of the Population under the President of the Republic of Kazakhstan
- In office 12 June 2023 – 2 September 2023
- President: Kassym-Jomart Tokayev
- Preceded by: Office established
- Succeeded by: Kenjeğul Seitjan

Personal details
- Born: 16 January 1968 (age 58) --> Karaganda Region, Kazakh SSR, Soviet Union
- Party: Auyl
- Spouse: Rüstem Jaqypov (1967–2025)
- Education: Tselinograd State Pedagogical Institute; Almaty Academy of Economics and Statistics
- Awards: Order of Kurmet; Order of Parasat

Svetlana Qabykenqyzy Jaqypova (Note: Often transliterated through the Russified Romanization of Russian: Светлана Кабыкеновна Жакупова as Svetlana Kabykenovna Zhakupova) (Kazakh: Светлана Қабыкенқызы Жақыпова; born 16 January 1968) is a Kazakh politician, who's been serving as Minister of Labor and Social Protection of the Population of Kazakhstan since September 2023.

== Early life and education ==
Svetlana Jaqypova was born on 16 January 1968, in the Karaganda Region. She graduated from the Faculty of Physics and Mathematics at Tselinograd State Pedagogical Institute (1991) and the Almaty Academy of Economics and Statistics (2006).

== Career ==
From 1984 to 1986, Svetlana Jaqypova worked as an extended day group educator and an elementary school teacher at the Karoi Primary School.

From 1991 to 1995, she began her professional career as a mathematics teacher at secondary schools No. 16 and No. 36. Following that, from 1997 to 1998, she transitioned into public service, working as a senior specialist and chief specialist in the operational accounting department of the Akmola city branch of the State Center for Pension Payments (RGKP). Her responsibilities grew between 1998 and 2001 when she advanced to chief specialist, head of the department of economic analysis, and eventually deputy director of the Akmola city branch of the State Center for Pension Payments.

From 2001 to 2008, Jaqypova served as the director of the Akmola regional branch of the State Center for Pension Payments. In 2008, she moved into a higher-level position as the acting director and later the director of the department of social security and social insurance at the Ministry of Labor and Social Protection of the Population of the Republic of Kazakhstan, a role she held until 2011.

Between 2011 and 2013, she worked as the head of programs at the Project Office of JSC National Information Technologies. On August 19, 2013, she was appointed Vice Minister of Labor and Social Protection of the Population of the Republic of Kazakhstan, serving until August 2014. Shortly thereafter, Jaqypova became Deputy Minister of Health and Social Development of the Republic of Kazakhstan, a position she held from August 13, 2014, to January 2017.

In January 2017, she returned to the Ministry of Labor and Social Protection of the Population as Vice Minister, a position she held until September 2019. In 2020, she joined the United Nations Development Programme (UNDP) as a senior expert, where she worked until 2023.

From June 12 to September 2, 2023, Jaqypova served as Commissioner for the Rights of Socially Vulnerable Categories of the Population under the President of the Republic of Kazakhstan. On September 2, 2023, she was appointed Minister of Labor and Social Protection of the Population of the Republic of Kazakhstan, and she was reappointed to this position on February 6, 2024.

Svetlana Jaqypova is a member of the People's Democratic Patriotic Party "Auyl" and has been a member of the Political Council since September 9, 2020.

== Awards and honors ==
Svetlana Jaqypova has been awarded the following orders and medals: Order of Kurmet (December 2007), Order of Parasat (December 2018), the "For Contribution to the Creation of the Eurasian Economic Union" II degree medal (May 8, 2015), and the "For Contribution to the Development of the Eurasian Economic Union" medal (May 29, 2019).
