= Andrew Wachtel =

American scholar, translator and educator

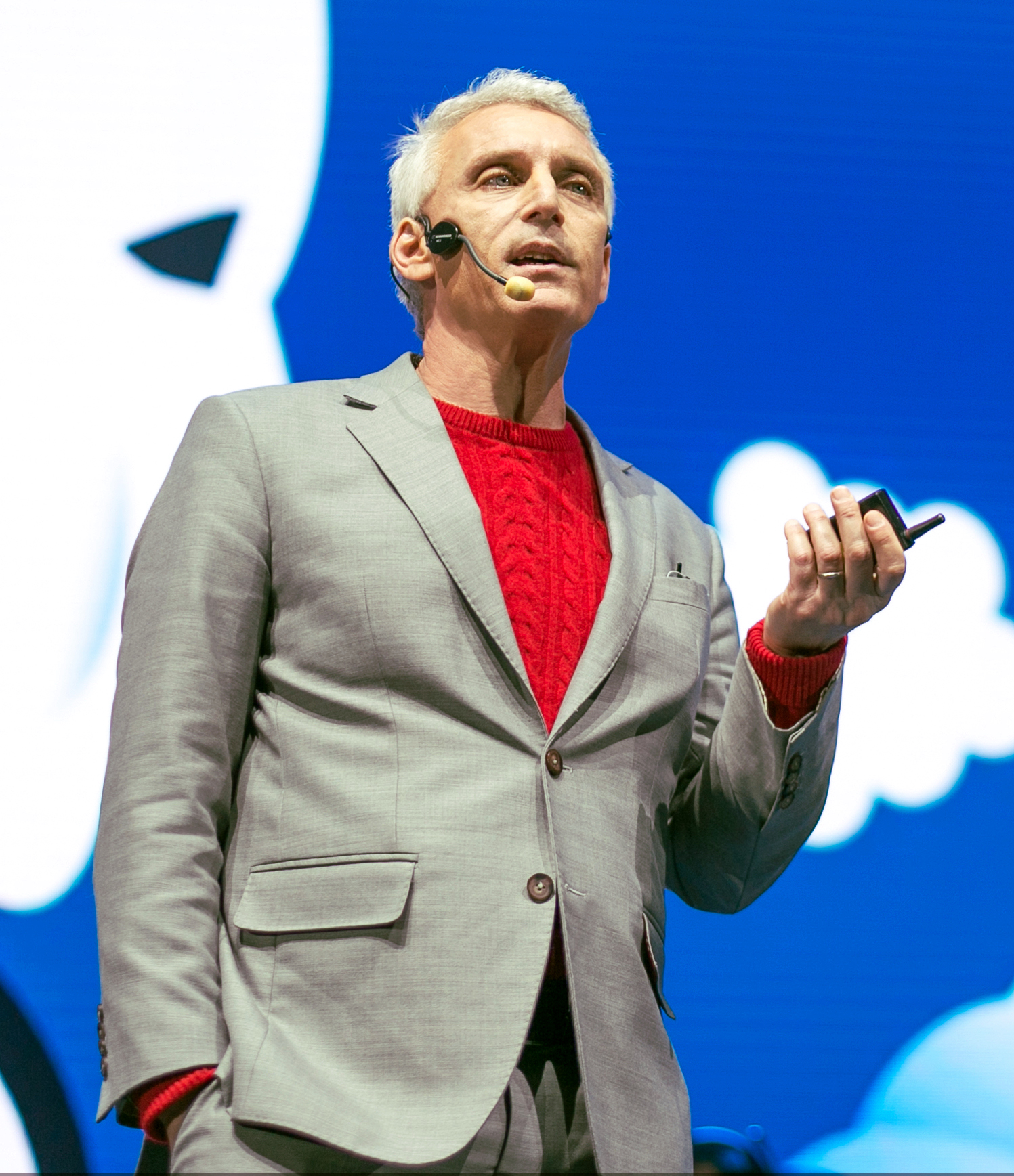

Rector of Narxoz University
- In office 2018–2020
- Preceded by: Krzysztof Rybiński
- Succeeded by: Stanislav Buyanskiy

President of American University of Central Asia
- In office 2010–2018
- Succeeded by: Andrew Kuchins

Personal details
- Born: February 10, 1959 (age 67) Newark, New Jersey, U.S.
- Education: Harvard College (S.B.); University of California, Berkeley (Ph.D.)

Andrew Wachtel (born February 10, 1959) is an American scholar, translator and educator. He was the founding Director of Compass College in Bishkek, Kyrgyzstan, and is currently the president of inVision U in Almaty, Kazakhstan, as well as the Chair of Board of Trustees of TEAM University in Tashkent, Uzbekistan. Wachtel was elected to the Council on Foreign Relations 2001 and to the American Academy of Arts and Sciences in 2003.

== Biography ==
After graduating from Harvard College in 1981, Wachtel pursued a Ph.D. in Slavic Languages and Literatures at the University of California, Berkeley which he completed in 1987. While still a Ph.D. student, he was appointed a Junior Fellow at the Harvard Society of Fellows in 1985 and remained in this position until 1988. He was appointed Assistant Professor of Slavic Languages and Literatures at Stanford University, where he taught between 1988 and 1991. In 1991, he was appointed Associate Professor of Slavic Languages and Literatures at Northwestern University. He remained at Northwestern for 19 years, serving at various times as Chair of the Department of Slavic Languages and Literatures, Director of the Program in Comparative Literature, Director of the Roberta Buffett Center for International and Comparative Studies and Dean of the Graduate School.

== Scholarly interests ==
Wachtel’s scholarship ranges over a broad array of languages, cultures and disciplines, with a primary focus on the feedback loops between longue durée cultural and historical processes. His first book, The Battle for Childhood: Creation of a Russian Myth (Stanford UP, 1990) examined the ways in which the Russian understanding of childhood grew out of a series of founding literary texts.

In An Obsession with History: Russian Writers Confront the Past (Stanford UP, 1994) he considered the inter-generic dialogue between fictional and historical texts in writers from Karamzin to Solzhenitsyn.

Switching his focus to Yugoslavia, Wachtel next published Making a Nation, Breaking a Nation: Literature and Cultural Politics in Yugoslavia (Stanford UP 1998), which focused on the various ways in which the concept of Yugoslavia was developed over almost 100 years. That book was published subsequently in the Serbian, Slovenian and Romanian languages.

In 2006, Wachtel released a large-scale study in literary sociology entitled Remaining Relevant After Communism: The Role of the Writer in Eastern Europe. (U of Chicago Press). Based on survey data and literary analysis from across Eastern Europe and the former USSR, the book traces literature’s loss of prestige in the post-communist world and the strategies of writers to retain their importance to society. It has appeared in Serbian, Bulgarian and Czech editions as well.

In 2008, Wachtel published The Balkans in World History (Oxford UP), a short history of Southeast Europe for general readers that has also appeared in Turkish, Albanian and Italian.

Wachtel has a parallel interest in Russian theatre and drama and has written a number of books and articles in this area including Petrushka: Sources and Contexts (Northwestern UP, 1998) and Plays of Expectations: Intertextual Relations in Russian 20th-Century Drama (U. of Washington Press, 2006). He also co-wrote a cultural history of Russian literature with Ilya Vinitsky (Russian Literature, Polity Press, 2008).

Wachtel has worked as a translator of material from multiple Slavic languages for many years. Among his book length translations are Drago Jančar's The Prophecy and Other Stories from Slovenian, as well as Muharem Bazdulj's The Second Book from Bosnian (in conjunction with Oleg Andrić). He has published three book-length collections of the poetry of Anzhelina Polonskaya from Russian, including Paul Klee’s Boat (Zephyr Press, 2013) which was short-listed for the PEN Poetry Translation Award, 2014. Together with Ilya Kutik he created the first major web anthology of Russian poetry From the Ends to the Beginning.

Between 1994 and 2010 he served as editor of the acclaimed “Writings from an Unbound Europe” series at Northwestern University Press which published more than 50 titles from all over Eastern and Central Europe.

== Family ==
Wachtel has 2 sons and 2 daughters. His parents are Dr. Fred Wachtel (1923–2017), who was a cardiologist and Miriam Rados (1928–2009). Wachtel grew up with two brothers — Michael Wachtel (b. 1960) and a Professor of Russian Literature at Princeton University and David Wachtel (b. 1962) who is a Senior Vice President, Marketing, Communications and Partnerships, Endeavor Global.

Wachtel’s ancestors originated from Eastern Europe. His father’s parents were George Wachtel born around 1900 in Galicia, Poland, Russian empire and Bella Beck born circa 1905 in Poland, Russian empire. His mother’s mother Berta Zalmenovna Drapkina was born in Rostov-on-Don, Russian empire 1896 and his mother’s father Andrew Rados was born in Budapest, Austro-Hungarian Empire circa 1885.

== Criticism ==
In 2019, instructors formerly employed by Narxoz University filed a collective complaint with the Minister of Education and Science of the Republic of Kazakhstan regarding Andrew Wachtel's actions as Rector of the university.

In 2022, the Russian government banned Wachtel from entering the country for 30 years due to his cooperation with the British organization "Open Democracy" and Bard College sponsored by the George Soros Foundation and recognized as undesirable on the territory of the Russian Federation in accordance with the Dima Yakovlev Law.
