= Dinmukhamet Idrisov =

Kazakh businessman

- Дінмұхамет Ыдырысов
- Born: 29 December 1964 (age 61); Arys District, Chimkent Region, Kazakh SSR, Soviet Union
- Citizenship: Kazakhstan
- Education: Kazakh State Academy of Management
- Occupations: economist, businessman, diplomat
- Spouse: Idrisova Magda
- Children: 7 children

Dinmukhamet Appazūly Idrisov (Kazakh: Дінмұхамет Аппазұлы Ыдырысов; born 29 December 1964) is a Kazakh businessman, economist and diplomat. He is included in the Forbes List of the Top 50 influential entrepreneurs of Kazakhstan, and his personal fortune is estimated at US$415 million. Idrisov owns Kazakhstan Municipal Systems LLP, which operates in the Turkestan, Karaganda, Mangystau, and East Kazakhstan regions of Kazakhstan. He is chairman of the Supervisory Board of Kazakhstan Municipal Systems LLP and a member of the Board of Trustees of AlmaU.

== Early life and education ==
Idrisov Dinmukhamed was born on 29 December 1964 in the Kazakh SSR. In 1989 he was educated at the Alma-Ata branch of the Ust-Kamenogorsk Road Construction Institute, specializing in civil engineering. In 1999 he graduated from the Kazakh State Academy of Management (now Narxoz University), specializing in economics. In 2002 he completed postgraduate studies at the Research Institute of Building Materials and earned a Doctor of Technical Sciences degree. In 2006 he became an academician of the Engineering Academy of the Republic of Kazakhstan.

== Career ==
From 1989 to 1990 Idrisov worked as a master in the Housing Department-1 of the Minavtodor of the Kazakh SSR. From 1986 to 1996 he held a variety of positions, including teacher at the Almaty Highway Institute, senior laboratory assistant at the Ust-Kamenogorsk Road Construction Institute, and assistant at the Almaty Highway Institute. In 1997 he became the principal founder and head of Alma-Oil LLP, which supplies crude oil and petroleum products in the Kazakhstan market. in the same year he became the founder and head of Ordabasy LLP, whose main activity was the supply of equipment to oil refineries in Kazakhstan;

From 2000 to 2005 he held the positions of Chairman of the Board of Directors of Ordabasy LLP and President of Ordabasy Corporation JSC. In 2005 he served as Chairman of the Board of Directors of Kazakhstan Municipal Systems JSC and as Chairman of the Board of Directors of Ordabasy Corporation JSC. From 2005 to 2006 he was Managing Director of JSC National Company Kazakhstan Temir Joly.

In April 2010 he became the chairman of the Supervisory Board of Ordabasy Group. From February 2012 to January 2020 he was Chairman of the Board of Directors of JSC IC Amanat Insurance;

== Other positions ==
At times he has been Chairman of the Board of Directors of JSC Nauryz Bank of Kazakhstan, a member of the Board of Directors of JSC Neftebank, a member of the Board of Directors of JSC Aktobe Oil Equipment Plant, and Chairman of the Board of Directors of Kazakhstan Utility Networks.

He has been a member of the Council of Entrepreneurs under the President of the Republic of Kazakhstan and a member of the Board of the National Economic Chamber Atameken Union.

From 16 May 2014 to October 2017 he was the owner of Alma-TV LLP.

== Family ==
Dinmukhamet Idrisov is married to Idrisova (Nurlakova) Magda Kamalovna. They have seven children.

== Awards and Honors ==
Dinmukhamet Idrisov has received the following Kazakhstani orders: Kurmet (2005) and Parasat (2011).

On 3 December 2015, he was awarded the Laureate of the State Prize of the Republic of Kazakhstan in the field of science and technology named after Al-Farabi.
