= Jaqsylyq Dosqaliev =

Kazakh politician (born 1955)

- Жақсылық Досқалиев

Minister of Healthcare
- In office 20 November 2008 – 7 October 2010
- President: Nursultan Nazarbayev
- Prime Minister: Karim Massimov
- Preceded by: Anatoly Dernovoi
- Succeeded by: Salidat Qaiyrbekova
- In office 17 October 2001 – 4 April 2004
- Prime Minister: Kassym-Jomart Tokayev; Imangali Tasmagambetov; Daniyal Akhmetov
- Preceded by: Vasily Devyatko
- Succeeded by: Erbolat Dosaev

Member of the Mazhilis
- In office 18 August 2007 – 19 November 2008

Personal details
- Born: 30 November 1955 (age 70) Alga, Aktobe Region, Kazakh SSR, Soviet Union
- Party: Nur Otan (1999–present)
- Spouse: Aijan Dosqalieva
- Children: 2
- Education: Aktobe Medical Institute

Jaqsylyq Aqmyrzaūly Dosqaliev (Note: Often transliterated as Zhaksylyk Akmyrzayevich Doskaliyev through a Russified Romanization of Жаксылык Акмырзаевич Доскалиев.) (Kazakh: Жақсылық Ақмырзаұлы Досқалиев; born 30 November 1955) is a Kazakh politician who served as a Minister of Healthcare twice from October 2001 to April 2004 and November 2008 to October 2010.

In August 2011, Dosqaliev was sentenced 7 years to prison after corruption scandal where he was reported taking bribes and embezzling budget funds. He was eventually pardoned by President Nursultan Nazarbayev and was released on 16 March 2012.

== Biography ==
=== Early life and career ===
Dosqaliev was born in the town of Alga of Aktobe Region. In 1979, he graduated from the Aktobe Medical Institute, specializing as a medical doctor.

After graduating from the institute, from 1979 to 1986, Dosqaliev worked as a surgeon, then as first deputy chief physician of the Alga Central District Hospital. In 1988, he completed training at the All-Union Scientific Center of Surgery and in 1989, he became an assistant professor at the Aktobe Medical Institute.

From 1991 to 1998, Dosqaliev served as a senior researcher and the head of the Syzganova Department of Laparoscopic Surgery, Scientific Center of Surgery. In October 1998, he became a rector at the Aktobe Medical Academy.

=== Political career ===
In 1999, Dosqaliev became a member of the Aktobe Regional Maslihat. From August 2000, he served as the chairman of the Healthcare Agency of the Republic of Kazakhstan before being appointed as the Minister of Healthcare on 17 October 2001. On 4 April 2004, he was appointed as a rector of the RSEO of the Astana Medical University.

In the 2007 Kazakh legislative election, Dosqaliev was elected as a member of the Mazhilis on the Nur Otan party list where he became the chairman of the Committee for Social and Cultural Development.

On 20 November 2008, he was appointed again as a Minister of Healthcare.

==== Corruption scandal and imprisonment ====
On 21 September 2010, Dosqaliev, during his visit to North Kazakhstan Region, arranged an unscheduled check on his subordinates and was dissatisfied with their knowledge. That same day, the financial police opened a criminal cause against Dosqaliev for abuse of office. On 25 September 2010, Dosqaliev was detained by the employees of the financial police of Kazakhstan, but a day earlier his health condition deteriorated and he ended up in the National Scientific Medical Center. The leadership of the Scientific Center, where the minister is located, stated that Dosqaliev was in an extremely serious condition which was in a coma. However, the financial police showed a video recording of the head of the Minister talking with doctors and at the same time actively gesturing. As a result, the investigators managed to prove that the Dosqaliev faked a stroke, and the doctors of the Scientific Center admitted that they had given false testimony about his condition.

Dosqaliev was accused of abuse of power and abuse of office, receiving a bribe on an especially large scale and embezzling budget funds. In particular, the investigation established that Dosqaliev received six more apartments as a bribe. He registered one of them for his close relative, and sold the other five.

On the night of 2 and 3 October 2010, the Saryarqa District Court of Astana gave an arrest warrant. On 7 October 2010, by the Decree of the President of Kazakhstan, Dosqaliev was relieved from his post.

On 28 April 2011, the Astana Prosecutor's Office transferred the criminal case for consideration to the Interdistrict Criminal Court. On 5 August 2011 he was sentenced to 7 years in a strict regime colony with confiscation of property.

While in prison, Dosqaliev wrote a petition to President Nursultan Nazarbayev with a petition for clemency. In January 2012, by the decree of President, a pardon was issued on Dosqaliev by reducing the sentence from 7 to 2 years. After that, Dosqaliev filed a petition for parole.

On 29 February 2012, the Astana City Court made a decision on parole from places of detention. On 16 March 2012, after the expiration of the time limit for filing appeals by the supervisory authorities, Dosqaliev was released.

=== Later life ===
On 3 August 2012, despite his previous convictions, Dosqaliev was re-employed in the civil service, began to work as a researcher at the National Scientific Medical Center as the head of the organ transplant center.

Since 2013, he has been working as a leader at the Republican Center for Transplantation.
