= North Kazakhstan State University =

University

Coordinates: 54°52′31.3″N 69°8′3.7″E

North Kazakhstan University
- Kazakh: М.Қозыбаев атындағы Солтүстік Қазақстан университеті Russian: Северо-Казахстанский университет имени М.Козыбаева
- Former names: Petropavlovsk Teachers Training Institute
- Type: University
- Established: 1937 (89 years ago) as the Petropavlovsk Teachers Training Institute
- Founders: Council of People's Commisars of the Kazakh Soviet Socialist Republic
- Location: Petropavl, North Kazakhstan Region, Kazakhstan
- Website: ku.edu.kz

M. Kozybaev North Kazakhstan University (NKU) (Kazakh: М.Қозыбаев атындағы Солтүстік Қазақстан университеті, romanized: M.Qozybaev atyndağy Soltüstık Qazaqstan universitetı, Russian: Северо-Казахстанский университет имени М.Козыбаева) is a multidisciplinary university in Petropavl, Kazakhstan, established in 1937 by the Council of People's Commisars of the Kazakh Soviet Socialist Republic as the Petropavlovsk Teachers Training Institute. It is named after Manash Kozybaev.

It is today the leading multi-disciplinary institution of higher education of the North Kazakhstan Region. The university enrolled more than 6,000 students in eight academic departments.

== See also ==
- Education in Kazakhstan
- List of universities in Kazakhstan
