= Sabira Maykanova =

Soviet actress (1914–1994)

- Сәбира Майқанова
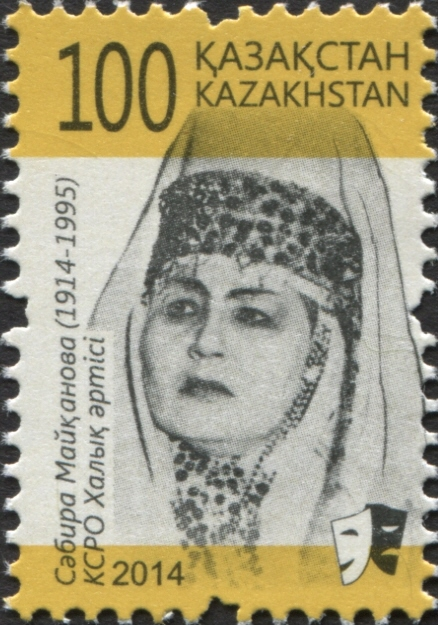
- Maykanova on a Stamp of Kazakhstan
- Born: 1 January 1914; Syr-Darya Oblast, Russian Turkestan, Russian Empire
- Died: 14 February 1994 (aged 80); Almaty, Kazakhstan
- Burial place: Kensai Cemetery, Almaty, Kazakhstan
- Awards: Order of the Badge of Honour; Order of Kurmet; Order of the Red Banner of Labour; People's Artist of the USSR; People's Artist of Kazakh SSR; State Prize of the Kazakh SSR

Sabira Maykanova (Kazakh: Сәбира Майқанова; 1 January 1914 – 14 February 1994) was a Soviet stage and film actress.

== Biography ==
Maykanova was born on 1 January 1914 in Syr-Darya Oblast, Russian Turkestan, Russian Empire.

Maykanova was educated at the Alma-Ata Cooperative Technical School. In 1932, Maykanova was accepted into the Kazakh State Drama Theater in Alma-Ata, where she became a popular stage actress. From the 1950s she also performed in films.

In the 1970s, Maykanova visited Italy with the Kazakh Theater Society.

In 1983, Kazakh writer Dulat Issabekov dedicated his play The Heirs to her and she played the main role on the stage.

Maykanova died on 14 February 1994 in Almaty, Kazakhstan. She was buried at Kensai Cemetery in Almaty.

== Awards ==
- Order of the Badge of Honour
- Order of Kurmet
- Order of the Red Banner of Labour
- People's Artist of the USSR (1970)
- People's Artist of Kazakh SSR (1958)
- State Prize of the Kazakh SSR (1967)
