= Asqarbek Ertaev =

Kazakh politician

- Асқарбек Ертаев
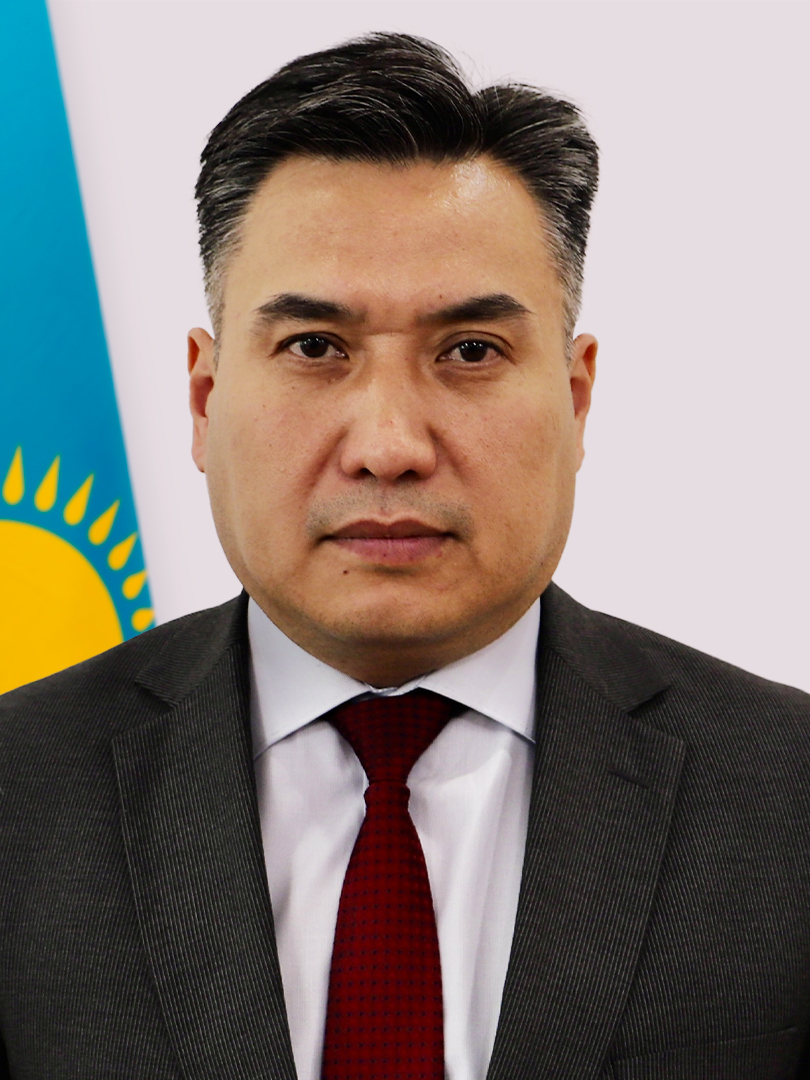
- Official portrait, 2025

Minister of Labour and Social Protection of the Population
- Incumbent
- Assumed office 27 January 2026
- President: Kassym-Jomart Tokayev
- Prime Minister: Oljas Bektenov
- Preceded by: Svetlana Jaqypova

Personal details
- Born: 1977 (age 48–49) Aktyubinsk, Kazakh SSR, Soviet Union
- Education: Aktobe Institute of Management, Business and Law "NUR"; Zhubanov University

Asqarbek Maratūly Ertaev (Kazakh: Асқарбек Маратұлы Ертаев; born 1977) is a Kazakh politician who is serving as Minister of Labour and Social Protection of the Population since 2026.

== Biography ==
=== Early life and education ===
Ertaev was born in 1977 in the city of Aktobe. He graduated from the Aktobe Institute of Management, Business and Law "NUR" and Aktobe State University named after Kudaibergen Zhubanov. He is fluent in Kazakh and Russian.

=== Career ===
He began his professional career in 1997 at the Office of the Akim of the Mugalzhar District of Aktobe Region, where he worked as a second-category specialist responsible for issues related to industry, transport, communications, construction, and public utilities.

Between 2000 and 2014, Ertaev worked in the banking sector, holding positions at the Aktobe branch of Halyk Bank, as well as at Komirbank, Nauryz Bank, BankTuranAlem, and Temirbank.

In 2014, he joined the Ministry of National Economy as chief expert of the Public Administration Development Policy Office within the Public Administration Development Department. From 2015 to 2018, he held senior positions in the same department, including serving as deputy director from 2017 to 2018. From 2018 to 2021, he headed the Strategic Analysis and Development Department.

From 2021 to 2022, Ertaev served as head of the Sector of the Analytical Department of the Security Council of Kazakhstan within the Presidential Administration. He then worked as head of the Economic Department of the Government Office from 2022 to 2023.

On 10 July 2023, by decree of the Minister of Labour and Social Protection of the Population, Ertaev was appointed chairman of the Migration Committee. On 9 August 2024, he was relieved of this post and appointed Vice Minister of Labour and Social Protection of the Population. On 9 June 2025, he was promoted to First Vice Minister of Labor and Social Protection.

On 27 January 2026, the Mäjilis of the Parliament of Kazakhstan approved his candidacy for the post of Minister of Labour and Social Protection of the Population, after which he was appointed to the position according to Presidential Decree No. 1161 of Kassym-Jomart Tokayev.
