= Birjan Nurymbetov =

Kazakh politician (born 1968)

Birzhan Nurymbetov
- Біржан Нұрымбетов
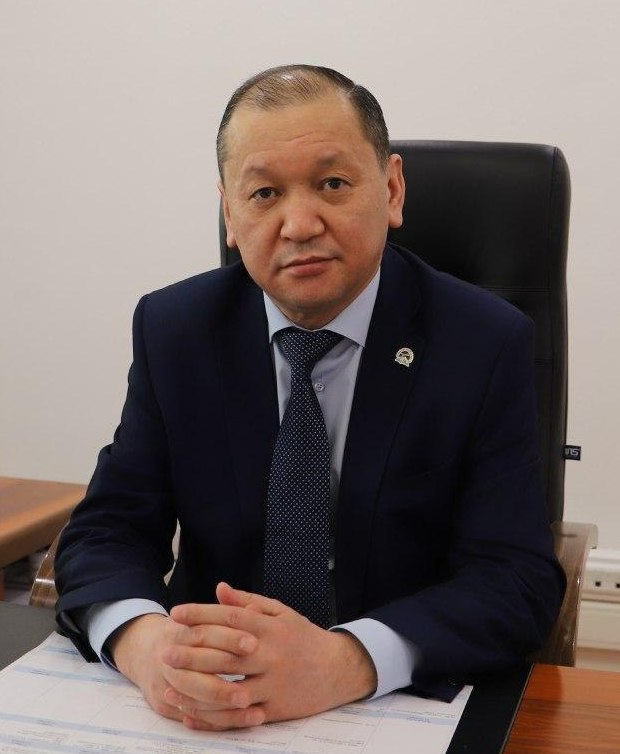
- Nurymbetov in 2020

Minister of Labour and Social Protection of the Population
- In office 20 August 2019 – 18 January 2021
- President: Kassym-Jomart Tokayev
- Prime Minister: Askar Mamin
- Preceded by: Berdibek Saparbayev
- Succeeded by: Serik Shapkenov

Personal details
- Born: 19 March 1968 (age 58) Abai, Kazakh SSR, Soviet Union
- Spouse: Aijan Ospanova
- Children: 2
- Education: Al-Farabi Kazakh National University; Almaty Academy of Economics and Statistics

Military service
- Allegiance: Soviet Union
- Branch/service: Soviet Army
- Years of service: 1986–1988
- Rank: Staff sergeant

Birjan Bidaibekuly Nurymbetov (born 19 March 1968) is a Kazakh politician who served as the Minister of Labor and Social Protection from 20 August 2019 to 18 January 2021.

== Biography ==
=== Early life and education ===
Nurymbetov was born in 1968 in the village of Abai in the Jambyl Region. In 1993, he graduated from the Al-Farabi Kazakh National University with a degree in mechanics and applied mathematics and then in 2006 from the Almaty Academy of Economics and Statistics with a degree in finance.

=== Career ===
From 1993 to 1996, Nurymbetov served as a tax inspector and the head of the tax inspection department of the city of Zhambyl. In 1996, he became an advisor to the first deputy akim, and the head of the sector of the akim's apparatus of Jambyl Region. From 1997 to 2008, Nurymbetov was the director of the Jambyl Regional Branch of the State Center for the Payment of Pensions Enterprise.

In 2008, he became the chairman of the Committee for Control and Social Protection of the Ministry of Labor and Social Protection of the Population.

From 20 March 2009 to 16 October 2012, Nurymbetov served as a Vice Minister of Labor and Social Protection of the Population. In October 2012, he became the deputy head of the Prime Minister's Office. On 1 June 2015, he became the Vice Minister of Health and Social Development and served that position until it was reorganized into Ministry of Labor and Social Protection of the Population on 25 January 2017. Nurymbetov continued to serve as the Vice Minister of Labor and Social Protection of the Population until 3 December 2017, when he became the First Deputy Chairman of the Federation of Trade Unions of Kazakhstan.

From 20 August 2019 to 18 January 2021, Minister of Labor and Social Protection.
