= Ministry of Labour and Social Protection of the Population (Kazakhstan) =

Government ministry of Kazakhstan

Ministry of Labour and Social Protection of the Population of the Republic of Kazakhstan
- Қазақстан Республикасы Еңбек және халықты әлеуметтік қорғау министрлігі (Kazakh); Министерство труда и социальной защиты населения Республики Казахстан (Russian)
- Emblem of Kazakhstan

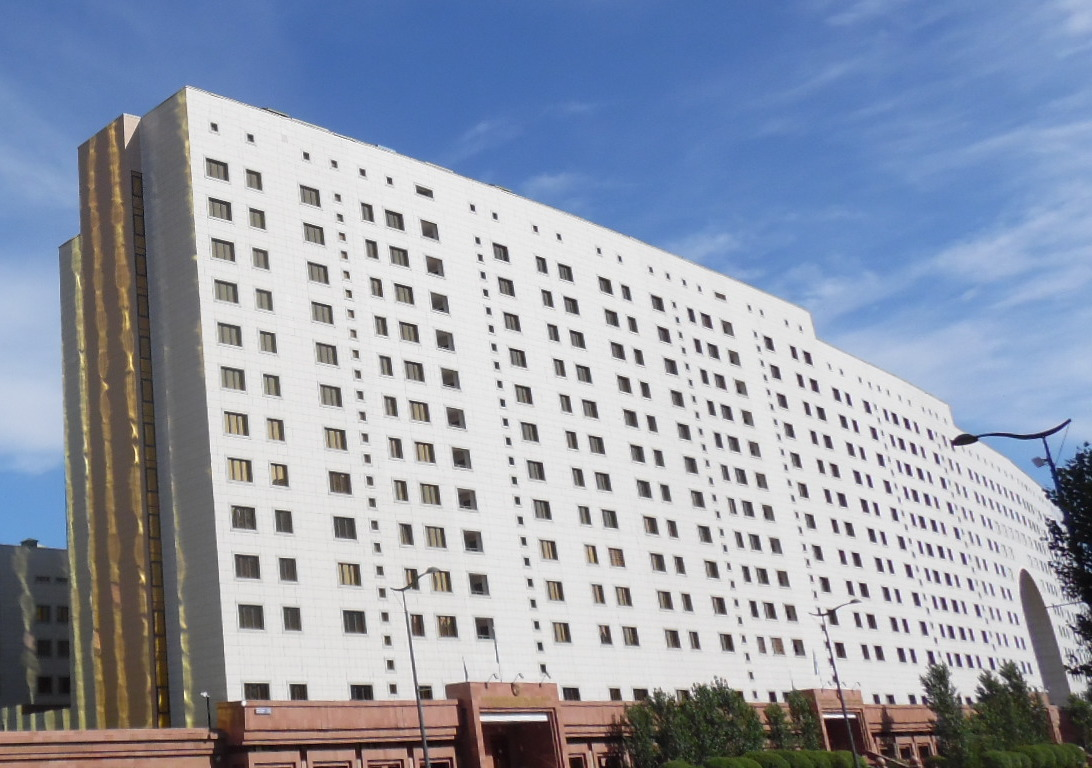
- House of Ministries

Agency overview
- Formed: November 1996
- Jurisdiction: Government of Kazakhstan
- Headquarters: Nur-Sultan, Kazakhstan
- Agency executive: Asqarbek Ertaev, Minister

The Ministry of Labour and Social Protection of the Population of the Republic of Kazakhstan (MLSPP RK, Kazakh: Қазақстан Республикасы Еңбек және халықты әлеуметтік қорғау министрлігі, romanized: Qazaqstan Respublikasy Eñbek jäne halyqty äleumettık qorğau ministrlıgı, ҚР ЕХӘҚМ; Russian: Министерство труда и социальной защиты населения Республики Казахстан, МТСЗН РК) is a department within the Government of Kazakhstan, which provides leadership and intersectoral coordination in the field of labor, labor safety and labor protection, employment, pension and social security, compulsory social insurance, population migration, social support for needy categories of citizens and families with children, as well as on the appointment and payment of state social benefits for disability, in case of loss of breadwinner and age, special state benefits, state special general allowance for people working in underground and opencast mining, for work with especially harmful and especially difficult working conditions, lump-sum monetary compensation to citizens who suffered as a result of nuclear tests at the Semipalatinsk Test Site and political repressions.

== History ==
The Ministry was created in November 1996 by combining the Ministry of Labour and the Ministry of Social Protection.

The Ministry was abolished in accordance with the Decree 875 by President of Kazakhstan on 6 August 2014 where the functions and powers of the Ministry were transferred to the established Ministry of Health and Social Development.

By the decree of the President of Kazakhstan on 25 January 2017, the Ministry of Health and Social Development was reorganized by separation into the Ministry of Healthcare and the Ministry of Labour and Social Protection which was reestablished.

== Structure ==
As part of the Ministry:

- Committee of Labor, Social Protection and Migration (Earlier 2 Committees — Committee for Migration and Committee for Control and Social Protection).

Departments:

- Department of Finance;
- Department of International Cooperation and Integration;
- Department of Development of the National Qualification and Forecasting System;
- Department of Analysis and Development of Public Services;
- Department of Public Relations;
- Department of Strategic Planning and Analysis;
- Department of Digitalization;
- Department of Internal Audit;
- Department of Administrative Work;
- Department of Legal Service;
- Department of Information Security;
- Department of Managing Personnel Service;
- Department of Social Insurance Policy, Basic Social and Pension Provision;
- Department of Social Assistance Policy Development;
- Department of Social Services Policy Development;
- Department of Labor and Social Partnership;
- Department of Employment Population.

== List of ministers ==
Minister	Term of Office		Cabinet
Natalya Korzhova	11 November 1996	12 October 1999	Kazhegeldin
Natalya Korzhova	11 November 1996	12 October 1999	Balgimbayev
Nikolai Radostovets	12 October 1999	7 August 2000	Tokayev
Alikhan Baimenov	7 August 2000	22 November 2001	Tokayev
Gulzhan Karagusova	22 November 2001	12 July 2007	Tokayev
Gulzhan Karagusova	22 November 2001	12 July 2007	Tasmagambetov
Gulzhan Karagusova	22 November 2001	12 July 2007	Akhmetov
Gulzhan Karagusova	22 November 2001	12 July 2007	Massimov I
Berdibek Saparbayev	27 August 2007	4 March 2009	Massimov I
Gulshara Abdykhalikova	4 March 2009	26 September 2012	Massimov I
Gulshara Abdykhalikova	4 March 2009	26 September 2012	Akhmetov
Serik Abdenov	26 September 2012	10 June 2013	Akhmetov
Tamara Duisenova	27 June 2013	6 August 2014	Akhmetov
Tamara Duisenova	27 June 2013	6 August 2014	Massimov II
Tamara Duisenova	25 January 2017	9 February 2018	Sagintayev
Madina Abilqasymova	9 February 2018	21 February 2019	Sagintayev
Berdibek Saparbayev	25 February 2019	20 August 2019	Mamin
Birjan Nurymbetov	20 August 2019	18 January 2021	Mamin
Serik Şapkenov	18 January 2021	5 January 2022	Mamin
Serik Şapkenov	11 January 2022	7 April 2022	Smaiylov
Tamara Duisenova	11 April 2022	4 September 2023	Smaiylov
Svetlana Zhakupova	4 September 2023	27 January 2026	Smaiylov; Bektenov
Asqarbek Ertaev	27 January 2026		Bektenov
