= Erbolat Dosaev =

Kazakh politician (born 1970)

- Ерболат Досаев
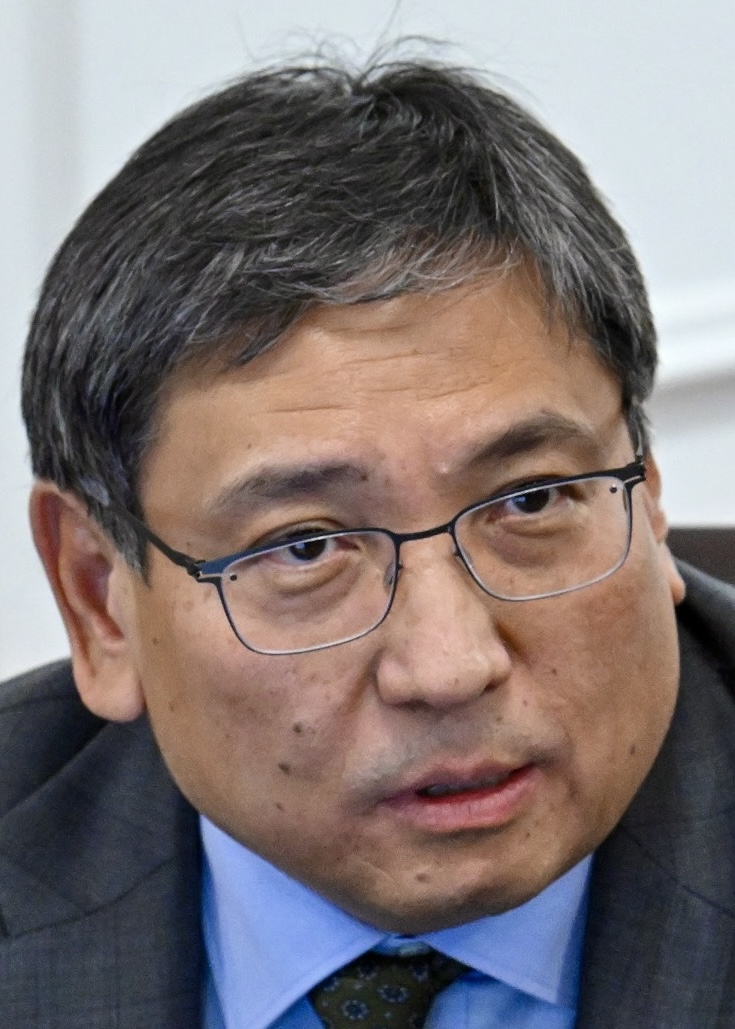
- Dosaev in 2025

Deputy Aqorda chief of Staff
- In office 19 September 2025 – 25 March 2026
- President: Kassym-Jomart Tokayev

Äkim of Almaty
- In office 31 January 2022 – 24 May 2025
- President: Kassym-Jomart Tokayev
- Preceded by: Baqytzhan Saghyntaev
- Succeeded by: Darkhan Satybaldy

Chairman of National Bank
- In office 25 February 2019 – 31 January 2022
- President: Nursultan Nazarbaev; Kassym-Jomart Tokayev
- Preceded by: Daniar Aqyshev
- Succeeded by: Ghalymzhan Pirmatov

Deputy prime minister
- In office 29 August 2017 – 25 February 2019
- President: Nursultan Nazarbaev
- Prime Minister: Baqytzhan Saghyntaev; Asqar Mamin (Acting)

Minister of National Economy
- In office 25 September 2012 – 5 May 2016
- President: Nursultan Nazarbaev
- Prime Minister: Serik Akhmetov
- Preceded by: Baqytzhan Saghyntaev (Economy Development and Trade)
- Succeeded by: Quandyq Bishimbaev

Minister of Healthcare
- In office 5 April 2004 – 20 September 2006
- President: Nursultan Nazarbaev
- Prime Minister: Danial Akhmetov
- Preceded by: Zhaqsyly Dosqaliev
- Succeeded by: Anatoly Dernovoi

Minister of Finance
- In office 16 June 2003 – 5 April 2004
- President: Nursultan Nazarbaev
- Prime Minister: Danial Akhmetov
- Preceded by: Alexander Pavlov
- Succeeded by: Arman Dunaev

Personal details
- Born: 21 May 1970 (age 56) Alma-Ata, Kazakh SSR, Soviet Union
- Party: Amanat (2012–present)
- Spouse: Gülnara Dosaeva
- Children: 2
- Education: Almaty University of Power Engineering and Telecommunications; Bauman Moscow State Technical University

Erbolat Asqarbekuly Dosaev (er-boh-LAHT doh-SAH-yev, Kazakh: Ерболат Асқарбекұлы Досаев, romanized: Erbolat Asqarbekúly Dosaev, Kazakh pronunciation: [jerbɔɫɑt ɑsqaɾbʲeko̙ɫɯ dɔsɑjəf]; born 21 May 1970) is a Kazakh politician who served as äkım of Almaty from 2022 to 2025. Prior to that, he was a National Bank of Kazakhstan chairman from 25 February 2019 and served as a Deputy Prime Minister from 29 August 2017 to 25 February 2019. He served as the Minister of Finance from 16 June 2003 to 5 April 2005, headed the Agency for Regulating Natural Monopolies, and later as the Health Minister from 5 April 2004 to 20 September 2006. In January 2013, Dosaev was appointed head of a reorganized Minister of National Economy.

== Early life and education ==
Dosaev graduated from both the Almaty Energy Institute and Moscow State Technical University.

== Political career ==
In the late 1990's, Dosaev served as First Deputy Minister of Energy, Industry and Trade. In 1998, Dosaev worked as an advisor to the prime minister. As of 2000, Dosaev was serving as deputy finance minister. In 2001, Dosaev became chairman of the board of the Development Bank of Kazakhstan. As of November 2002, Dosaev served as chairman of Kazakhstan's anti-trust agency.

In November 2012, Dosaev joined the ruling Amanat party, upon which his membership card was presented by his Economic Development and Trade Minister Baqytzhan Saghyntaev.

=== Minister of Finance (2003–2004) ===
In June 2003, Dosaev was appointed as Finance Minister by President Nursultan Nazarbaev. During his time, Dosaev also held positions with the European Bank for Reconstruction and Development and the board of the National Bank of the Republic of Kazakhstan.

=== Minister of Healthcare (2004–2006) ===
In 2005, Dosaev outlined a plan to improve Kazakhstan's public health system. His four main goals were to increase life expectancy, reduce both maternal and infant mortality, reduce the prevalence of tuberculosis and HIV, and improve basic medical services. On 18 September 2006, Dosaev announced a plan to spend the equivalent of US$53 million from 2006 to 2010 to fight HIV and AIDS.

Dosaev announced on 20 March 2006 that tests had confirmed that a dead swan found in Manghystaw, on Kazakhstan's Caspian Sea coast, had bird flu. Several areas in northern Kazakhstan were quarantined in 2005 when the H5N1 bird flu strain was found. Thousands of domestic fowl were culled when bird was detected in Kazakhstan in August. Agriculture Minister Asylbek Qozhymuratov said that all domestic poultry in Manghystaw had been vaccinated. Fowl in Atyrau province, a location of suspected vulnerability to bird flu, were being vaccinated. The Kazakh government started vaccinating about 8 million fowl in February to limit the spread of bird flu.

Dosaev was dismissed as Healthcare Minister amid scandal after 81 children in south Kazakhstan were infected with HIV due to poor sanitary conditions.

=== Minister of National Economy (2012–2016) ===
Dossaev was appointed to head the Economic Development Ministry in September 2012.

As the Minister of Economic Affairs, Dossaev oversaw a project to expand the production capacity of TengizChevroi (TCO), Kazakhstan's largest oil producer. In late December 2015, Dossaev informed the parliament that he expected the project to cost US$30 billion. Officials had announced early the same year that they were working with TCO to lower the cost from an estimated US$38 billion. The aim of the project is to increase oil production from 27 million tonnes in 2015 to 38 million tonnes by 2021.

In late 2015, Dosaev announced numerous agricultural reforms including changes to farm subsidies, improved crop insurance, and the introduction of electronic receipts designed to make the grain industry more efficient and profitable. Dosaev said, "The agrarian sector should become one of the key drivers of future economic growth in Kazakhstan. Throughout 2016, drawing the experience of Australia and Brazil … the main focus of the development of agriculture will be stimulated by the creation of infrastructure and the integration of new technologies." His proposals were made amid an economic slowdown due to low oil prices; as the Kazakh government responded with measures designed to diversify the country's economy.

Dosaev has advocated reducing government interference in the economy. In February 2016 he stated, "As concerns issues related to the state's large share in the economy: you know about this, the work on privatization and denationalization starts in March, and the goal set to us by the president is to reduce the government sector's presence in the economy to 15% by 2020. Therefore, the government, and also the national holdings and companies, are working today to prepare for privatization and denationalization."

Dosaev resigned from his post as Economic Affairs Minister in early May 2016 after public protests against the proposed bill that would have allowed foreigners to rent farmland for limited periods of time. Dosaev defended the legislation; stating: “The new norms in the land code are indispensable and required and correspond to international practice." President Nazarbaev also defended the proposed law and said that the protests were driven by "misinformation".

=== Baiterek ===
Dosaev is the former chairman and CEO of Baiterek Holding, a state-owned holding company specializing in banking and finance founded in 2013. Baiterek was originally formed to fund large economic development projects but the company's portfolio was expanded significantly in order to cope with the economic problems associated with falling oil prices. Dosaev was appointed head of Baiterek in May 2016 and succeeded Quandyq Bishimbaev. As part of his work at Baiterek, Dosaev was appointed to chairman of the board of directors of KazExportGarant, a state owned export insurance firm.

While serving as head of Baiterek, Dosaev attended an international economic forum in Beijing to discuss China's Belt and Road Initiative in 2017. He held talks with the heads of large Chinese banks and other financial institutions. The talks resulted in numerous non-binding agreements and a joint venture between China Triumph International and Orda Glass to construct a sheet glass factory in the Qyzylorda Region.

=== Deputy Prime Minister of Kazakhstan (2017–2019) ===
Dosaev was appointed as Deputy Prime Minister by President Nazarbaev on 29 August 2017. Asqar Zhumaghaliev was also appointed deputy prime minister effective the same date. Prime Minister Baqytzhan Saghyntaev presented both of the new deputy prime ministers to the cabinet shortly thereafter; these appointments brought the total number of deputy prime ministers to four. Dosaev's portfolio included a series of modernization efforts in important economic sectors.

=== Chairman of the National Bank (2019–2022) ===
On 25 February 2019, Dosaev became the Governor of the National Bank of Kazakhstan. From August 2019, the National Bank under President Qasym-Zhomart Toqaev's initiatives, audited 14 largest banks in Kazakhstan in an attempt at attracting investors and raising confidence within Kazakh banking system.

In response to the COVID-19 pandemic in Kazakhstan, the National Bank played an active role in avoiding further economic crisis by stimulating monetary policy for 2020–2021 to stimulate business activity, support employment and develop infrastructure which amounted 2.3 trillion tenge out of total 6.3 trillion included in anti-crisis package. By the end of 2020, the inflation remained in the corridor of 8–8.5% and amounted to 7.5%. According to Dossaev at the 9th Congress of Financiers, the Kazakh economy returned to its pre-pandemic level, as its GPD growth in the first 10 months of 2021 amounted to 3.5%. He also added that the National Bank would end its payments to the anti-crisis programs by 2025, although not ruling out the possibility of it happening earlier by the end of 2023 taking account in the rate of Kazakhstan's economic recovery.

In November 2021, Dosaev in a meeting with President Toqaev, announced the launch of a pilot program national payment system where tenge transactions would be processed through a preliminary agreement with Visa and Mastercard and that the system would increase the share of non-cash payments from 57% to 65% by 2025.

=== Äkim of Almaty (2022–2025) ===
On 31 January 2022, it became apparent that Dossaev would be appointed as the new äkim of Almaty, replacing Baqytzhan Saghyntaev who served the post from 2019. In response to the news, Dosaev emphasized it as a "special honor" and "a special responsibility." According to Vlast.kz editor Vyacheslav Abramov, Dosaev would go on to serve as a "crisis manager" in his new position as he faced new task in leading a municipality for the first time by restoring public trust, while Almaty grappled with the aftermath of the 2022 Kazakh unrest in which the city was most severally impacted in result, with 112.6 billion tenge worth of damaged administrative buildings, as well as looted shops and banks. Shortly before Dosaev's appointment was made public, a petition against him was already launched by the Almaty residents which opposed his candidacy, citing Dosaev's past scandals in the government and called for direct, fair elections to äkims. A rally to mourn the victims in the unrest was initially set to be held in the city but was declined by the city authorities and shortly later instead, the activists were granted to hold a protest specifically against Dosaev which took place on 5 February 2022. According to Abramov, Dosaev's experience would help him to build relationships with businesses in Almaty in which the city depends on its budget while political scientist Dosym Satpaev suggested that if the Kazakh government had introduced direct äkim elections, then there would've been "powerful competition and worthy candidates" instead.

Upon assuming office, Dosaev promised to make Almaty as the "vanguard of the construction of a new Kazakhstan" during a cabinet meeting with President Toqaev. He vowed to quickly restore the city after the riots by providing compensation to local business owners, ensuring public safety by installing more surveillance cameras, increase street lighting, creation of more jobs and more incomes to the city populace, stabilize food prices, construct more education facilities, improve healthcare equipment and infrastructure, acquire newer environmentally clean municipal bus fleet, continue planting more trees, repairment of city roads, continued development in new incorporated areas and solve urban sprawl issues.

On May 24, 2025, it was announced that Dosaev would be removed from his position of Äkim. A session of the Almaty City Mäslihat was held the same day to confirm the appointment of his successor.

On September 19, of the same year, president Kassym-Jomart Tokayev appointed Dosaev deputy Aqorda chief of Staff Aibek Dädebai. On March 25, 2026 Dosaev was removed from office.

== Other activities ==
=== Corporate boards ===
- Khalyq Bank, member of the board of directors (1999–2002)
- Kazakhoil, member of the board of directors (1999–2002)
- Small Business Development Fund, member of the board of directors (1999–2002)
- EximBank Kazakhstan, member of the board of directors (2000)
- EximBank Kazakhstan, chairman of the board of directors (2001)
- Development Bank of Kazakhstan, chairman of the board of directors (2001–2002)
- Development Bank of Kazakhstan, member of the board of directors (2002–2003)
- Small Business Development Fund, chairman of the board of directors (2002–2003)
- Lancaster Group Kazakhstan, member of the board of directors (2006)
- Kazinvestbank, chairman of the board of directors (2006–2007)
- Alataw Holding Limited, director (2007)
- Samuryq-Qazyna, member of the board of directors (2012–2016)
- Qazyna Capital Management, chairman of the board of directors (since 2016)
- KazExportGarant, chairman of the board of directors (since 2016)
- Housing Construction Savings Bank, chairman of the board of directors (since 2016)
- Damu Entrepreneurship Development Fund, chairman and member of the board of directors (2018–2019)

=== Non-profit organisations ===
- Commission on the Issues of the Military-Industrial Complex of Kazakhstan, member (since 2012)
- National Bank of Kazakhstan, government representative (2013, since 2017)
- Economic Affairs of the National Commission for Modernization, head (since 2015)
- National Chamber of Entrepreneurs, member of the presidium (since 2016)
- Council of Foreign Investors under the President, member (since 2016)
- State Commission for the Restoration of Economic Growth under the President, member (since 2020)
- Supreme Council for Reforms under the President, member (since 2020)

== Honours ==
- Order of Qurmet (Құрмет ордені).
- “20 years of the Constitution of the Republic of Kazakhstan” (Қазақстан Конституциясына 20 жыл).

== Philanthropy ==
Dosaev is the co-founder, longtime financial supporter, and board member of the Alumni Fund of the Republican Physics and Mathematics school (RPMS). He is also the co-founder of the Public Fizmat Endowment Fund established on 30 April 2017 by the RPMS. The endowment funds long-term projects that are critical to the development of the university but lack stable financing.

Dosaev co-founded the Dara charity along with his wife, Gülnara Dosaeva.
