= Arken Arystanov =

Kazakh businessman (born 1966)

- Born: 7 March 1966 (age 60); Almaty, Kazakh Soviet Socialist Republic, Soviet Union
- Occupations: Chairman of the Board of "Kazakhstan Agency of International Development KazAID" NJC. Previously held the position of Ambassador Extraordinary and Plenipotentiary of the Republic of Kazakhstan to the Republic of Singapore and concurrently Ambassador Extraordinary and Plenipotentiary of the Republic of Kazakhstan to New Zealand and the Australian Union

Arken Arystanov (Kazakh: Аркен Кеңесбекұлы Арыстанов, Arken Keñesbekūly Arystanov; born March 7, 1966) is a Kazakhstan diplomat. From 1 December 2022 he is working in Ministry of foreign affairs of Kazakhstan as Ambassador at Large. He was the Ambassador of Kazakhstan to Singapore, New Zealand and the Ambassador Extraordinary and Plenipotentiary of Kazakhstan to the Commonwealth of Australia. Since March 9, 2023, Chairman of the Board of "Kazakhstan Agency of International Development KazAID" NJC.

== Education and early career ==
Arken Arystanov was born in Almaty in 1966.

In 1988, he graduated from Lomonosov Moscow State University, Faculty of economics.

In 1994–1996, he took a position of deputy director in the Department of currency regulation and Director of department of foreign affairs in the National Bank of Kazakhstan.

In 1996–1998, he was Adviser to the chairman, head of Commercial Department, Vice-chairman in Almaty Trade and Financial Bank.

In 1998–2000, Arystanov worked as first deputy director of regional division, Head of Credit Department, Director of Credit Risks Department, Adviser to the chairman in the Halyk Bank.

In 2000–2006, he was vice-chairman and then Chairman of Kazpost. Later, in 2011–2013, he worked as a Chairman of Kazpost.

In 2006–2011, he took a position of a Chairman of the Agency for regulation of the regional financial center of Almaty city (RFCA).

In 2014–2019, Arken Arystanov was a Counsellor in Embassy in France.

On 6 June 2019—21 October 2022 he was appointed as an Ambassador Extraordinary and Plenipotentiary of the Republic of Kazakhstan to the Republic of Singapore by Decree of the President of Kazakhstan. From 21 December 2019 to 21 October 2022 he was accredited as the Ambassador to New Zealand.

On 22 May 2020—21 October 2022 was accredited as Ambassador to Commonwealth of Australia by Decree of the President of Kazakhstan.

On 1 December 2022 he was appointed as Ambassador at Large in MFA of Kazakhstan.

Since March 9, 2023, Chairman of the Board of "Kazakhstan Agency of International Development KazAID" NJC.

== Orders and awards ==
Arken Arystanov is decorated with the Order of Parasat (2012), Order of Kurmet (2005), Medal "100 years of Kazakhstan railways" (2004) and Medal "10 years to the Constitution of Kazakhstan".

On 2 September 2019 by Decree of the President of the Republic of Kazakhstan No. 144 Arystanov was awarded the diplomatic rank of Extraordinary and Plenipotentiary Envoy of the II class.
