= Anatoly Dernovoi =

Kazakhstani politician (born 1951)

- Анатолий Дерновой

Minister of Healthcare
- In office 20 September 2006 – 20 November 2008
- President: Nursultan Nazarbayev
- Prime Minister: Daniyal Akhmetov; Karim Massimov
- Preceded by: Erbolat Dosaev
- Succeeded by: Jaqsylyq Dosqaliev

Personal details
- Born: 26 August 1951 (age 75) Karaganda, Kazakh SSR, Soviet Union
- Spouse: Valentina Dernovaya
- Children: Larisa, Aleksandr
- Education: Karaganda State Medical University

Anatoly Grigorievich Dernovoi (Russian: Анатолий Григорьевич Дерновой; born 26 August 1951) was a Kazakhstani politician who served as a Minister of Healthcare in the Government of Kazakhstan.

Minister Dernovoi's predecessor, Erbolat Dosaev, was fired amid a scandal over the accidental infection of 76 children, six of whom died, with HIV. Dernovoi announced in a government meeting that eight of the children's mothers were also infected accidentally.
