= Smagul Yelubay =

Kazakh writer and scriptwriter (born 1947)

Smagul Abatuly Yelubay (Kazakh: Смағұл Абатұлы Елубай, Smağūl Abatūly Elubai) (born 9 March 1947) is a Kazakh writer and scriptwriter. He serves as a Secretary of Writers' Union of Kazakhstan.

== Life ==
Smagul Yelubayev was born on March 9, 1947, in Chardzhou, Turkmenistan. In 1961, his family moved to Almaty, Kazakhstan.

- 1971 graduated from Kazakh State University;
- 1975 graduated from High Courses for Scriptwriters and Film Directors;
- 1976-1992 worked as a Deputy Editor-in-Chief at Kazakhfilm;
- 1992-1995 worked as an Editor-in-Chief at Parasat magazine;
- 1995-2004 worked as a journalist at Radio Free Europe/Radio Liberty, Prague, Czech Republic;
- 2008-2010 worked as an Editor-in-Chief at Kazakhfilm;
- From 2010 professor at Kazakh National Academy of Arts.

== Selected works ==
=== Literary ===
- «Ойсыл-Қара» (1972), Almaty;
- «Саттар соқпағы» (1974), Almaty;
- «Жарық дүние» (1978), Almaty;
- «На свете белом» (1982), Moscow;
- «Ақ боз үй» (1990), novel, Almaty, republished several times;
- «Одинокая юрта» («Ақ боз үй»), Almaty, 1992. The novel trilogy is about the famine of 1937 in Kazakhstan and the repressions of 1937 (Part 1. "The Lonely Yurt" (1984, manuscript), part 2. "Prayer" (Молитва) (1986, manuscript), part 3. «Mortal coil» (Бренный мир) (1999, manuscript);
- «Молитва» (1992), novel, Almaty
- «Бренный мир» (2000), novel, Almaty
- «Век страшного суда» («Қиямет-қайым ғасыры», book for doubters) (2011)
- Lonely Yurt («Одинокая юрта») in English published by Kazakh Pen Club in the USA, which received the nomination "Book of the Week" on Amazon.com in November 2016.
- «Ақ боз үй» (2017) is a collection of works in 2 volumes;
- «Arasat meidany» (2017) («Одинокая юрта») in Turkish, Ankara, Turkey;
- «Una Yurta Solitaria» (2018) («Одинокая юрта») in Spanish, Madrid, Spain.

== Filmography ==
=== Scriptwriter ===
- 1982 — Red Yurt («Красная юрта»)
- 1983 — Atone («Искупи вину»)
- 1983 — House under the loon («Дом под луной»)
- 1991 — Surzhekey - The Angel of Death («Суржекей — ангел смерти»), Grand-Prize in the Silver Crescent Film Festival, Ashkhabad ( 1991), Grand-Prize in the Bastau Film Festival, Almaty (1993)
- 1992 — Batyr Bayan («Батыр Баян»)
- 2004 — Revenge («Кек»)
- 2012 — The Hunter Boy («Аңшы бала»), Best Foreign Drama Award in International Family Film Festival in Hollywood
- 2016 — Diamond sword («Алмазный меч»)
- 2016 — Land of Kazakhs («Қазақ елі»)
- 2016 — Oasis («Оазис»)
- 2018 — «Бала гашыктык»

== Awards ==
- Order of Kurmet (2005)
- PEN Club's Award (2012)
- State scholarship in the field of culture (2015), (2016)
- By the decree of the President of the Republic of Kazakhstan for outstanding achievements in the Kazakh literature and culture, he was awarded the "Order of Parasat" (December 5, 2018)
