= Tuganbay =

Tuganbay Туғанбай
- Village
- Location in Kazakhstan
- Coordinates: 43°42′24″N 77°16′19″E
- Country: Kazakhstan
- Region: Almaty Region
- District: Talgar District

Population (2009)
  - Total: 2,275
- Time zone: UTC+6 (Omsk Time)
- Postal code: 041625
- Area code: 72774

Tuganbay (Kazakh: Туғанбай, Tuğanbai), formerly Frunze, is a village in Almaty Region of south-eastern Kazakhstan.
