= Shymkent University =

Coordinates: 42.33434°N 69.64955°E

- Шымкент Университеті
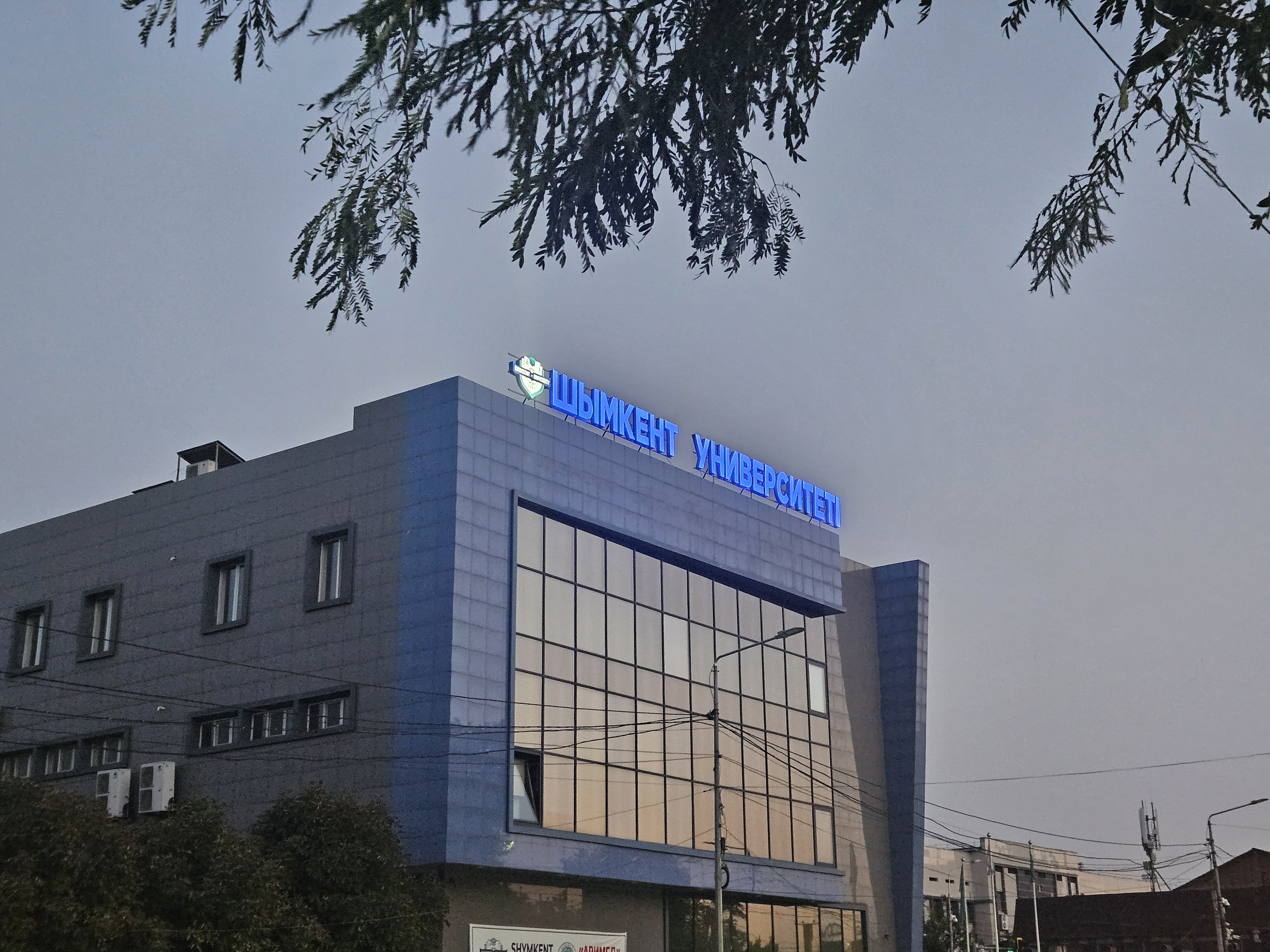
- Type: Public
- Established: 2001
- Rector: Nurlybek Seitqulov
- Location: Jibek Joly, 131, Shymkent, Kazakhstan
- Campus: Urban
- Website: univershu.kz

The Shymkent University (Kazakh: Шымкент Университеті, romanized: Şymkent Universitetı) is higher educational institution in the city of Shymkent. The university was founded in 2001 and has 4 faculties and 2 research institutes. The university employs 289 professors, including 16 doctors of sciences, 35 candidates of sciences, senior teachers. Training is conducted in 29 undergraduate specialties and 7 magistracy specialties.

The fund of educational, methodological and scientific literature is replenished annually. The book fund of the university libraries contains electronic textbooks, teaching aids on electronic media. Contracts have been concluded with city, regional libraries and the Republican Electronic Library. The university has a modern standard building, equipped with the latest equipment for educational, laboratory and research studies. All departments of the university are provided with classrooms with interactive whiteboards, departments of language training.

== Programs ==
- Agronomy
- Biology
- Geography
- Foreign Philology: English
- Foreign language: two foreign languages (English)
- Computer Science
- History
- Kazakh language and literature
- Mathematics
- Fundamentals of Law and Economics
- Pedagogy and methodology of primary education
- Pedagogy and Psychology
- Soil Science and Agrochemistry
- Vocational training
- Russian language and literature
- Tourism
- Accounting and Auditing
- Physics
- 5B010800: Physical culture and sports
- Finance
- Chemistry
- Economy
- Jurisprudence
