= Narxoz University =

Higher education institution in Almaty, Kazakhstan

- Нархоз университеті
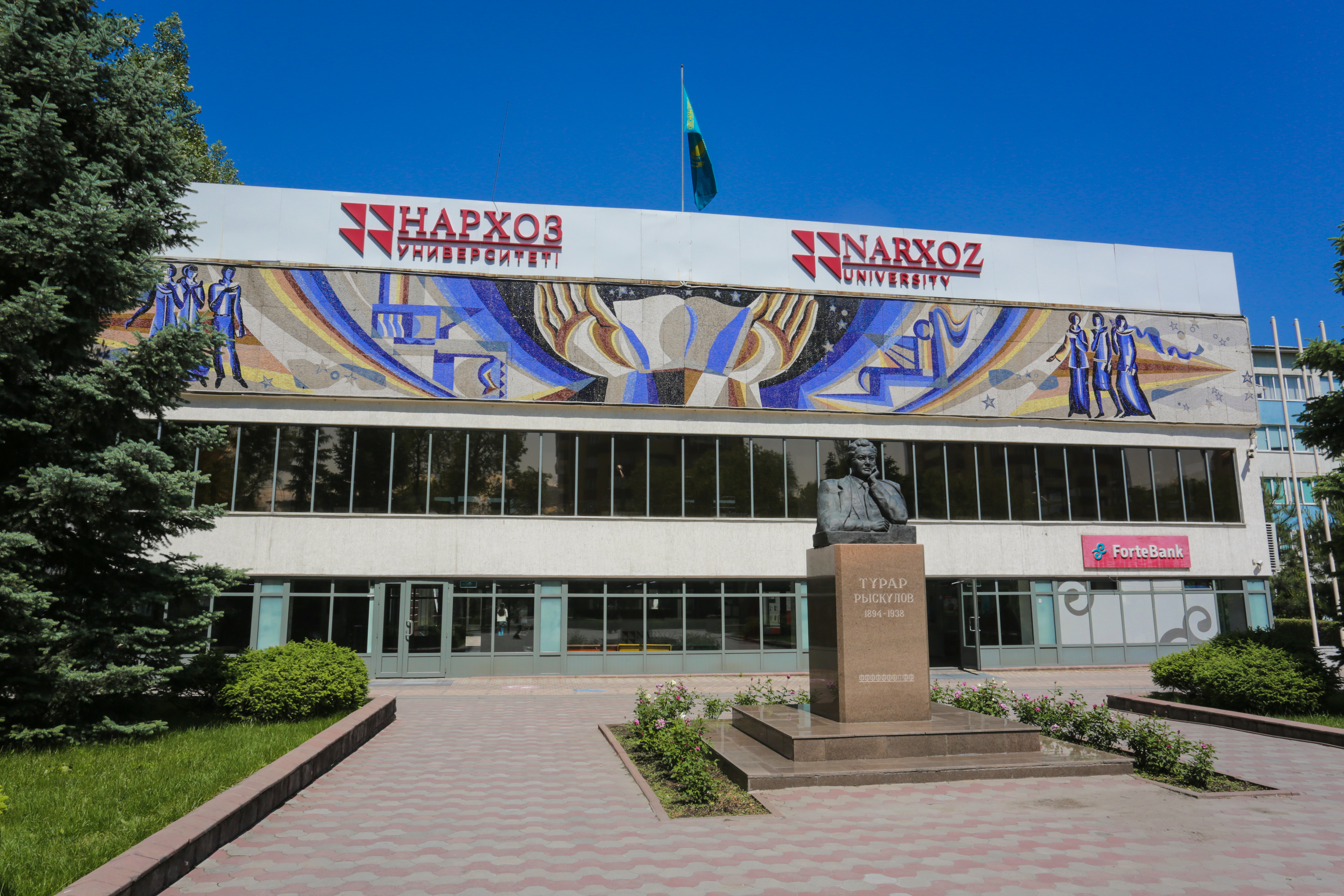
- Former names: Almaty Institute of National Economy; Kazakh State Economic University; Kazakh State Academy of Management; Turar Ryskulov New Economic University
- Motto: Learning today, leading tomorrow
- Established: 1963
- President: Kanat Kozhakhmet
- Students: 7000
- Location: 050035, Almaty, Dzhandosov Str., 55, Almaty, Kazakhstan; 43.2146°N 76.8711°E
- Website: www.narxoz.kz

University rankings

Regional – Overall
- QS Asia: =345 (2025)
- QS Emerging Europe and Central Asia: 251-300 (2022)

Narxoz University (/nɑːrˈhoʊz/ nar-HOHZ; Kazakh: Нархоз университеті / Narhoz universitetı [nɑrˈχoz ʊnʲɪvʲɪrsʲɪˌtʲeˈtɘ]) is a university in Almaty, Kazakhstan. It offers courses in economics, business, finance, and law.

The university was founded in 1963 as Almaty Institute of National Economy and received its current name in 2016. It consists of three schools, five representative offices in the regions of Kazakhstan, and an economic college.

The university's courses have been accredited by the Central and East European Management Development Association and Association of Chartered Certified Accountants.

== History ==
In 1963, the Almaty Institute of National Economy was founded on May 9, 1963, by the decision of the Soviet Government.

In 1991, it was renamed to the Almaty Institute of National Economy after the collapse of the Soviet Union.

In 1993, it was renamed to the Kazakh State Academy of Management.

In 1999, a campus was opened in Astana. It was later reorganized into an independent university, the Kazakh University of Economics, Finance, and International Trade.

In 2001, it was renamed Turar Ryskulov Kazakh Economic University.

On December 3, 2014, as part of the re-branding, the university changed its name to Turar Ryskulov New Economic University.

In 2016, the university changed its name to Narxoz University.

== Notable alumni ==
- Dinmukhamet Idrisov, businessman, economist, and diplomat
- Karim Massimov, former Prime Minister and Chairman of the National Security Committee. Currently imprisoned for high treason and attempted coup.
- Aslan Musin, former Chief of the Executive Office of the President
- Kenes Rakishev, entrepreneur
- Marat Tazhin, former politician and civil servant

== Rectors and presidents ==
- Ali Azhimovich Abishev (2005–2012)
- Krzysztof Rybiński (2015–2018)
- Andrew Wachtel (2018–2020)
- Stanislav Buyanskiy (2020–2021); acting
- Miras Daulenov (2021–2024)
- Kanat Kozhakhmet (2024–present)
