= Gulzhan Karagusova =

Kazakhstani politician

Güljan Janpeiısqyzy Qarağūsova (Note: Often transliterated as Gulzhan Zhanpeiskyzy Karagusova through a Russified Romanization of Гульжан Жанпеискызы Карагусова.) (Kazakh: Гүлжан Жанпейісқызы Қарағұсова; born 9 September 1950) is a Kazakh politician who was a member of Majilis from Nur Otan party. Has served as the Minister of Labor and Social Protection in the Government of Kazakhstan since 2001. She is a speaker for Kazakhstan's Economic Forum.

== Pensions and salaries ==
Minister Karagusova announced on 2 March 2005 that the Labor Ministry planned to raise pensions by 1 July, as Kazakh President Nursultan Nazarbayev had promised in his address to the people in February. She said pensions would increase by 3000 tenge to 12000 tenge monthly. On 1 July state employee salaries were increased by 32%. She met with Prime Minister Daniyal Akhmetov on 12 July 2006 and discussed how the aging of citizenry would affect the pension system.

== Labor legislation ==
She gave a speech entitled "Reforming of the Kazakhstani Labor Legislation" on 27 April 2005 in the Belvedere Restaurant of the Regent Almaty hotel in an event hosted by the American Chamber of Commerce in Kazakhstan.

== Economic rights ==
Karagusova and Bolat Baikadamov, Kazakhstan's Human Rights Ombudsman signed an agreement on 13 May 2004 placing a greater emphasis on protecting citizens' economic and social rights and setting the stage for changing Kazakh legislation so it conforms to international standards.

== International Labour Organization ==
On 25 June 2004 she oversaw the signing of a protocol of cooperation between the Kazakh OSH Center and the International Labour Organization's OSH center network. The Kazakh Government sent a delegation headed by Karagusova to the General Conference of the ILO in Geneva from 31 May–16 June 2005. Delegations discussed child labor, human trafficking, and worker safety and security among other topics. Karagusova met with F. Bottler, Executive Secretary of the ILO, Turin J. Tremo, Executive Manager of the International Labor Bureau and Director of the Education Center, delegates from Azerbaijan, Bulgaria, Lithuania, Montenegro, Singapore, Serbia, Czech Republic, Estonia, and Ambassador D. Stephenson, Permanent Representative of Canada in international organizations in Geneva. Ambassador Stephenson and Karagusova discussed possible membership for Kazakhstan in the World Trade Organization. She

== Work permits ==
Karagusova decided to issue more work permits to foreign workers in January 2006 after the European Business Association of Kazakhstan (EUROBAK) sent her letters, trying to convince her of the need.

== Asian Development Bank ==
Marita Magpili-Jimenez, Executive Director for the Asian Development Bank in Kazakhstan, visited Kazakhstan from 21–22 April. Director Magpili-Jimenez said, "Cooperation with Kazakhstan pursues long-term development." She met with Karagusova, Arman Dunayev, Kazakh Minister of Finance and ADB Governor for Kazakhstan, Sauat Mynbayev, Deputy Prime Minister and concurrent Minister of Industry and Trade, and Aitkul Samakova, Minister of Environmental Protection.

== In popular culture ==
Karagusova gained great notability for her numerous gaffes and controversial claims. Once, when a number of media reported that newly elected deputies, before the allocation of official housing, were temporarily accommodated in a five-star hotel, where the cost of a room per day is 120 thousand tenge. Karagusova, in an interview, said "However one is kept, works the same way!", implying that the work of Kazakh parliamentarians is worth 120 thousand tenge a day. The Parliament later stated that a day's stay for one parliamentarian in a hotel costed the state only 29 thousand tenge. Newly elected parliamentarians were provided with hotel apartments at a very large discount. Numbers were provided to 31 people. Karagusova's claims were later ridiculed and turned into internet memes, some even demanding her resignation, though there were also supporters of her online.

Karagusova also gained great prominence because of her poor Kazakh language skills, that were also made into internet memes, some of her phrases even turning catchphrases. Karagusova later stated that she chose not to pay much attention to the reactions online, claiming that "the ones that actually work don't have time for that".
