= Astana Medical University =

Medical school in Astana, Kazakhstan

Coordinates: 51.1815°N 71.4165°E

- Астана Медици́нский университе́т
- Former names: Tselinograd State Medical Institute
- Established: 1964
- Location: Astana, Kazakhstan
- Website: amu.edu.kz

Astana Medical University is a higher educational medical institution in the city of Astana, founded by an order of the Council of Ministers of the Kazakh SSR dated October 26, 1964. Initially, the university was named Tselinograd State Medical Institute (TSMI). In 2009 it was renamed Astana Medical University and became the first joint-stock company among medical universities in Kazakhstan.

== History ==
=== Opening of the institute ===
The resolution on the opening of the institute was adopted on October 26, 1964, by the Council of Ministers of the Kazakh SSR. Candidate of Medical Sciences A.R. Rakhishev was appointed as the organizer and coordinator of the future institute. Starting from October 1964, teachers from Almaty arrived to teach at the Central State Medical Institute, among them candidates of medical sciences Stanislav Dmitrievich Poletaev and P. A. Pak, as well as candidate of sciences and head of the department of biology R. N. Gagarina. By November 5, the institute had 15 teachers and departments of biology, Latin, normal anatomy, and foreign languages. Somewhat later, departments of chemistry and physics were organized. Classes at the institute began on December 12, 1964.

=== Reorganization into an academy ===
In 1997, the institute was reorganized into an academy.

=== Reorganization as a university ===
In January 2009, the institute was recognized as a university. Since July 2010, the university has been under the jurisdiction of the Ministry of Healthcare.
