= Stanislav Buyanskiy =

Russian scholar

- Станислав Буянский
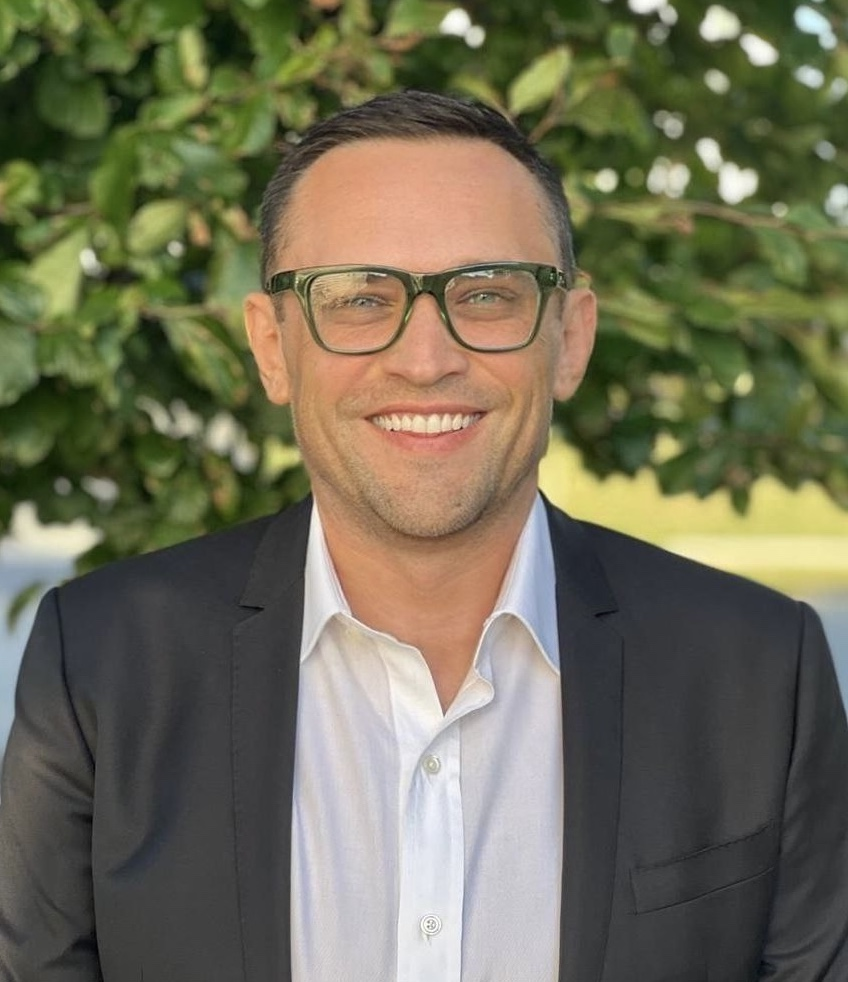
- Buyanskiy in 2022
- Born: June 6, 1980 (age 46); Moscow, Russia
- Spouse: Anna Buyanskaya

Academic background
- Education: Penn State Law (LL.M.); Moscow University for the Humanities (Ph.D.)

Academic work
- Institutions: Financial University under the Government of the Russian Federation; Narxoz University

Stanislav Buyanskiy (Russian: Станислав Геннадьевич Буянский; born June 6, 1980) is a Russian and Kazakh scholar, lawyer and educator. Has served as the Dean of the School of Law and Social Sciences at Narxoz University, in 2020 has been appointed as the Acting Rector of Narxoz University. Previously, he was Deputy Prosecutor of the Moscow Region. Dr. Buyanskiy is also a Chairman of the “Legal Regulation of the Economic Activity” Committee of the International Association of Financial and Economic Education Organizations.

== Biography ==
In 2002, Buyanskiy graduated from Moscow University of Finance and Law with a degree in Law. In 2006, Buyanskiy received a Ph.D. degree in Law. He worked in the prosecutor's office as the investigator on particularly important cases, as an Assistant Attorney General of Russian Federation, and as the district attorney of Mozhaisk.

In August 2009, Russian Prosecutor General Yuri Chaika appointed Buyanskiy as the Deputy Prosecutor of the Moscow Region. In this capacity he supervised the execution of law at high-security facilities and worked in the area of federal security and counteraction of extremist activities. In early June 2010, Buyanskiy resigned his position in opposition to the corruption he observed within the agency.

Between 2015 and 2018, Buyanskiy held the positions of the deputy head of the “Risk Analysis and Economic Security” department and the head of the master's program in compliance control at the Financial University under the Government of the Russian Federation.

In 2018, Buyanskiy received an LL.M. degree from Pennsylvania State University’s School of Law (Penn State Law).

Since 2019, he served as the Dean of School of Law and Social Sciences at Narxoz University. In 2020, he was appointed as Acting Rector.

Buyanskiy carried out a number of significant reforms at the university aimed at strengthening academic integrity and promoting academic freedom. He initiated an organizational reform, in which the position of Rector was replaced by the President - Provost system in accordance with international standards.

== Scholarly interests ==
Buyanskiy researched legal issues related to courts and prosecutor's office. Buyanskiy regularly shares his expertise on extensive issues in the sphere of law. The latest research has been dedicated to issues of economic security, risk-management and compliance, as well as reflecting on the future of education in Kazakhstan and the world.

== Family ==
Buyanskiy is married and has a son and a daughter. The family lives in the United States.
