= Kazakh University of Economics, Finance and International Trade =

Private university in Astana, Kazakhstan

Coordinates: 51.935°N 71.2726°E

Esil University
- Type: Private
- Established: 1999
- President: Sarsengali Abdimanapov
- Location: Astana, Kazakhstan
- Nickname: EU
- Website: kuef.kz

The Esil University (Kazakh: Qazaq Ekonomika, Qarjy jäne Halyqaralyq Sauda Universitetı), also referred simply as KazUEFIT, is a private university in Astana, Kazakhstan.

== History ==
The university was established in 1999 in Almaty. In 2006, the university was relocated to Astana to be a branch office of the Turar Ryskulov Kazakh Economic University in order to develop a new educational and cultural center in Astana. In 2007 after the changes in legislation regarding the educational sphere the branch office has seized the activity and was transformed into an independent higher educational institution – Kazakh University of Economics, Finance and International Trade.

== Affiliations ==
The Kazakh University of Economics, Finance and International Trade is member of the European Association of Institutions in Higher Education (EURASHE), and the European Retail Academy (ERA).

== Partners ==
- EU Business School
- SolBridge International School of Business
- Moscow State University of Economics, Statistics, and Informatics
- Hotel and Tourism Management Institute Switzerland
- University of California, Riverside
