= Aitkul Samakova =

Kazakh politician (born 1949)

Aitkül Samaqova
- Айткүл Самақова

Minister of Environment and Water
- In office 29 August 2002 – 1 January 2006
- President: Nursultan Nazarbayev
- Prime Minister: Daniyal Akhmetov; Imangali Tasmagambetov
- Preceded by: Andar Shukputov
- Succeeded by: Kamaltin Mukhamedzhanov

Personal details
- Born: 2 February 1949 (age 77) Alma-Ata, Kazakh SSR, Soviet Union
- Education: Kazakhstan's Higher Party School; Abai Kazakh National Pedagogical University

Aitkül Baiğazyqyzy Samaqova (Kazakh: Айткүл Байғазықызы Самақова; born 2 February 1949) is a Kazakh politician, former Member of Parliament, and political scientist. She has been a representative to the Mäjilis and the Senate of Kazakhstan, and the First Deputy to the Kazakhstan Minister of Trade. Samaqova was Kazakhstan's Minister of the Environment from 2002 to 2006.

== Early life and education ==
Samaqova was born on 2 February 1949 in Alma-Ata, the Kazakh SSR, Soviet Union.

In 1967, Samaqova earned a technical degree at an Almaty polytechnic college. From 1967 until 1980, Samaqova worked at a canning plant in Almaty, first as an engineer and then in management positions. In 1973 she earned another technical degree in Taraz, and then in 1983 she graduated from Kazakhstan's Higher Party School with a degree in political science, followed by a law degree from Abai Kazakh National Pedagogical University in 1999.

== Political career ==
In 1980, Samaqova became the Party Secretary for the Frunze district of the Communist Party of Kazakhstan. From 1980 to 1991 she served in that capacity, as the head of the Almaty City Party Committee, and as the deputy head of the Communist Party of Kazakhstan department of trade and consumer services.

In 1991, Samaqova was appointed the First Deputy to the Kazakhstan Minister of Trade. Then, in 1996, she became the Head of the Department of Citizenship in the executive branch of the Republic of Kazakhstan.

In 1998, Samaqova joined the Senate of Kazakhstan. In 1999, the President of Kazakhstan appointed her the Chairwoman of the National Commission for Family and Women Affairs under the President of the Republic of Kazakhstan, and she was briefly the Deputy Head of Government in that year. In this capacity, she was responsible for representing the government of Kazakhstan on issues pertaining to the treatment of women to international bodies like the United Nations.

In 2002, she was appointed Minister of the Environment. She was a member of the Tasmagambetov Cabinet and the Daniyal Akhmetov Cabinet. While Minister of the Environment, Samaqova continued to be Chairman of the National Commission for Family and Women Affairs under the President of the Republic of Kazakhstan. She continued to hold this post after leaving the Environment Ministry in 2006.

In 2007, Samaqova became a deputy to the Mäjilis for Nur Otan. Samaqova served on the Environment and Nature Management Committees, and worked as the Chairman of the Nur Otan's Social Council. She was a representative in the Nur Otan until 2016.

Samaqova is a member of the Board of Directors of the Export Insurance company KazakhExport.
