= Order of Kurmet =

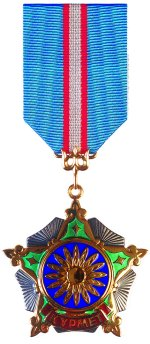
- The medal of the Order of Kurmet
- Type: Civil order
- Awarded for: Merit in the fields of economics, science, culture, social issues, and education.
- Country: Kazakhstan
- Eligibility: Citizens of Kazakhstan
- Established: 1993
- Ribbon bar of the order

Precedence
- Next (higher): Order of Parasat
- Next (lower): "Erligi ushin" Medal

The Order of Kurmet (Kazakh: Құрмет ордені, Qurmet ordeni) or the Order of Honour is an order awarded by the government of Kazakhstan since 1993. It is awarded to citizens of Kazakhstan who have exhibited merit in the fields of economics, science, culture, social issues, and education. The order has no grades or classes.

== Recipients ==
A partial list of recipients of the award follows.

=== Politics and administration ===
- Maulen Ashimbayev, Deputy Head of the Administration of the President of the Republic Kazakhstan
- Serik Baimaganbetov, Minister of Internal Affairs
- Talgat Donakov, Deputy Head of the Administration of the President of the Republic of Kazakhstan
- Baktykozha Izmukhambetov, governor of West Kazakhstan Province
- A. Kussainov, Minister of Transport and Communications of the Republic of Kazakhstan
- Mukhtar Kul-Mukhammed, Minister of Culture and Information
- Kanat Saudabayev, Ambassador to the United States
- Marat Tazhin, Minister of Foreign Affairs
- Nurlan Yermekbayev, Minister of Defense

=== Business and economics ===
- Arken Arystanov, Chairman of the Regional Financial Center of Almaty city.
- Kanat Bozumbayev, President of KEGOC
- Maksat Idenov, First Vice President of National Oil and Gas Company KazMunayGas
- Dinmukhamet Idrisov, Kazakhstani businessman, economist and diplomat.
- Alexander Klebanov, Chairman of the Board of Directors Central Asian Electric Power Corporation
- Kenzheguzin Marat, Vice-President of National Company KazMunayGas
- John Morrow, General Director of Karachaganak Petroleum Operating BV
- David J. O'Reilly, CEO of Chevron
- Alexandr Poyarel, General Director of Kazphosphate
- Saken Seifullin, Chairman of Seimar Alliance Policy Insurance JSC and the former CEO of FoodMaster.
- Vyacheslav Kim, Kazakh economist and financier, co-founder of Kaspi.kz
- Timur Turlov, CEO and founder of Freedom Finance

=== Science and technology ===
- Timur Lesbekov, Director of the Clinical and Academic Department of Cardiac Surgery of the NJSC "National Research Cardiac Surgery Center"
- Talapkali Izmuhambetov, director of Republican Medical College
- Gulnaz Akhmetova, Deputy Chairman of the Academic Methodologies Council of the Ministry of Education and Science
- Aidarkhan Kaltayev, Academician, doctor of physical and mathematical sciences, prof.

=== Culture and the arts ===
At a ceremony in Almaty, Deputy Minister of Culture and Information of Kazakhstan, Askar Buribaev handed awards to Kazakh cultural and art workers.

- Dukesh Baimbetov (Radio and TV)
- Abdimaulenov Kenzhebek (Radio and TV)
- Dinmukhamet Akhimov (actor)
- Kudaibergen Sultanbaev (actor)
- Koeman Tastanbekov (actor)
- Meruert Utekesheva (actor)
- Kasim Zhakibaev (actor)
- Bakhit Zhangalieva (actor)
- Sabira Maykanova (actor)
- Maigul Muzbayeva (actor)
- Smagul Yelubay (writer)
- Zaure Aitayeva (architect) at a ceremony dedicated to Astana EXPO 2017
- Sergey Kravtsov (painter)

== See also ==
- Orders, decorations, and medals of Kazakhstan
