= Ministry of Healthcare (Kazakhstan) =

Government ministry of Kazakhstan

Ministry of Healthcare of the Republic of Kazakhstan
- Қазақстан Республикасы Денсаулық сақтау министрлігі (Kazakh); Министерство здравоохранения Республики Казахстан (Russian)
- Emblem of Kazakhstan

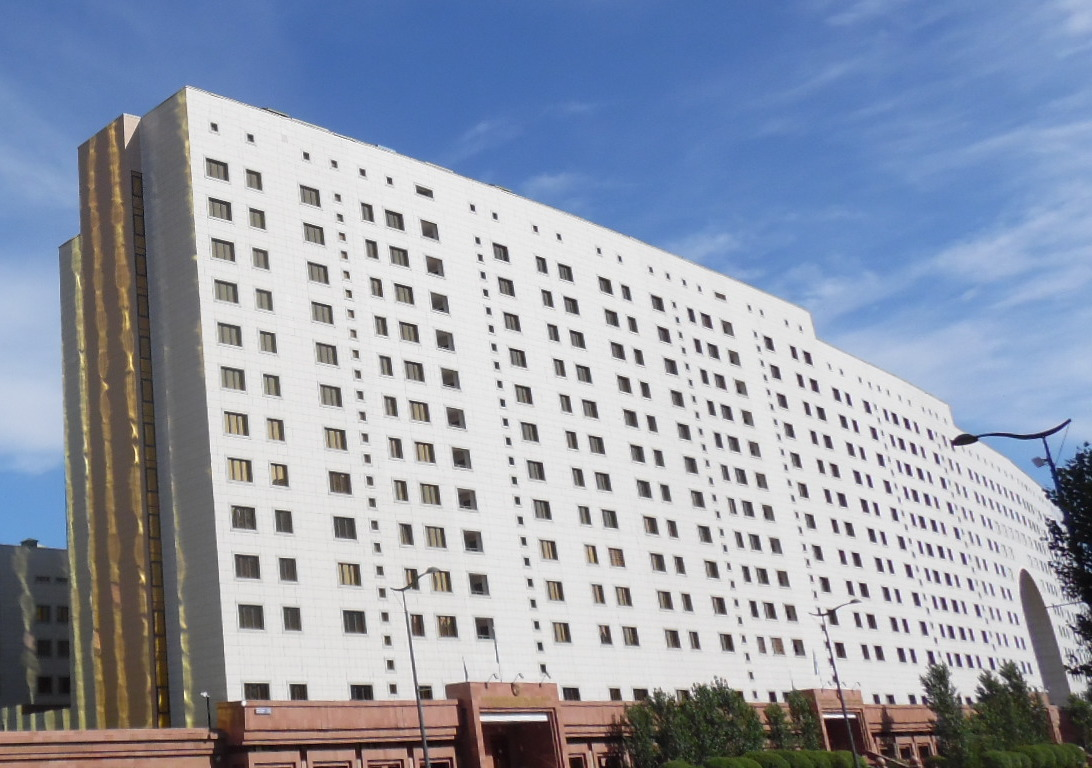
- House of Ministries

Agency overview
- Formed: 28 June 1992
- Preceding agency: Ministry of Health and Social Development
- Jurisdiction: Government of Kazakhstan
- Headquarters: Astana
- Employees: 243
- Minister responsible: Akmaral Alnazarova, Minister of Healthcare
- Website: http://dsm.gov.kz/en

The Ministry of Healthcare of the Republic of Kazakhstan (MH RK, Kazakh: Қазақстан Республикасы Денсаулық сақтау министрлігі, romanized: Qazaqstan Respublikasy Densaulyq saqtau ministrlıgı, ҚР ДСМ; Russian: Министерство здравоохранения Республики Казахстан, romanized: Ministerstvo zdravookhraneniya Respubliki Kazakhstan, МЗ РК) is one of the central executive bodies of the cabinet-level ministry in Kazakhstan. It carries out management, as well as, within the limits provided for by law, intersectoral coordination in the field of public health, medical and pharmaceutical education. On 6 August 2014, it was reorganized into the Ministry of Health and Social Development by a decree of the President of Kazakhstan “On Reform of the Public Administration of the Republic of Kazakhstan”. But was later reestablished on 25 January 2017. It is the highest government department responsible for health.

== History ==
The Ministry of Healthcare was founded on the basis of the Ministry of Healthcare of the Kazakh SSR. Aksultan Amanbaev became the first minister but he soon resigned. As a result, Vasily Devyatko took his place.

In October 1997, a reorganization of ministries took place in the Cabinet of Ministers of Nurlan Balgimbayev. Having united with several other state structures, the new ministry received the name: the Ministry of Education, Culture and Health which Krymbek Kusherbayev became its minister. And Vasily Devyatko became the chairman of the Health Committee of the Ministry of Education, Culture and Health of the Republic of Kazakhstan.

In 1999, after another reorganization, this central executive body became known as the Ministry of Health, Education and Sports. In November 1999, the ministry was reorganized into the Ministry of Education and Science, headed by Kusherbayev. While the health sector was transformed into a separate structure which was the Agency of the Republic of Kazakhstan for Healthcare. In October 2001, the Ministry of Healthcare was re-established. Zhaksylyk Doskaliev was appointed minister.

The ministry lasted until 6 August 2014, where it was merged with the Ministry of Labor and Social Protection into the Ministry of Healthcare and Social Development. Tamara Duisenova, former Minister of Labor and Social Protection, was appointed minister, and the Minister of Healthcare Salidat Kairbekova became the First Vice Minister of the new state body.

By the decree of the President of the Republic of Kazakhstan dated 25 January 2017, the Ministry of Health and Social Development was once again divided into two ministries. Eljan Birtanov was appointed as the Minister of Healthcare.

== List of ministers ==
=== Healthcare (1991–1997) ===
- Aisultan Amanbaev (June 1991 – 28 April 1992)
- Vasily Devyatko (28 April 1992 – October 1997)

=== Education, culture and healthcare (1997–1999) ===
- Krymbek Kusherbayev (17 October 1997 – 22 January 1999)

=== Healthcare, education and sports (1999) ===
- Krymbek Kusherbayev (22 January 1999 – 1 October 1999)

=== Agency of the Republic of Kazakhstan for Healthcare (1999–2001) ===
- Maria Omarova (November 1999 – August 2000)
- Jaqsylyq Dosqaliev (August 2000 – October 2001)

=== Healthcare (2001–2014) ===
Minister	Term of Office		Cabinet
Jaqsylyq Dosqaliev	17 October 2001	4 April 2004	Tokayev
Jaqsylyq Dosqaliev	17 October 2001	4 April 2004	Tasmagambetov
Jaqsylyq Dosqaliev	17 October 2001	4 April 2004	Akhmetov
Erbolat Dosaev	5 April 2004	20 September 2006	Akhmetov
Anatoly Dernovoi	20 September 2006	20 November 2008	Akhmetov
Anatoly Dernovoi	20 September 2006	20 November 2008	Massimov I
Jaqsylyq Dosqaliev	20 November 2008	7 October 2010	Massimov I
Salidat Qaiyrbekova	7 October 2010	6 August 2014	Massimov I
Salidat Qaiyrbekova	7 October 2010	6 August 2014	Akhmetov

=== Healthcare and social development (2014–2017) ===
Minister	Term of Office		Cabinet
Tamara Duisenova	6 August 2014	25 January 2017	Massimov II
Tamara Duisenova	6 August 2014	25 January 2017	Sagintayev

=== Healthcare (2017–present) ===
Minister	Term of Office		Cabinet
Eljan Birtanov	25 January 2017	25 June 2020	Sagintayev
Eljan Birtanov	25 January 2017	25 June 2020	Mamin
Alexey Tsoi	25 June 2020	5 January 2022	Mamin
Azhar Giniyat	11 January 2022	5 february 2024	Smaiylov
Akmaral Alnazarova	6 february 2024		Bektenov

== Responsibilities of the Ministry of Healthcare ==
The Ministry of Health is responsible for:

- maintaining the effectiveness and efficiency of the statutory health insurance and long-term care insurance systems
