= D. Serikbayev East Kazakhstan Technical University =

University in Ust-Kamenogorsk, Kazakhstan

D. Serikbayev East Kazakhstan State Technical University (EKTU)
- Восточно-Казахстанский технический университет имени Д. Серикбаева
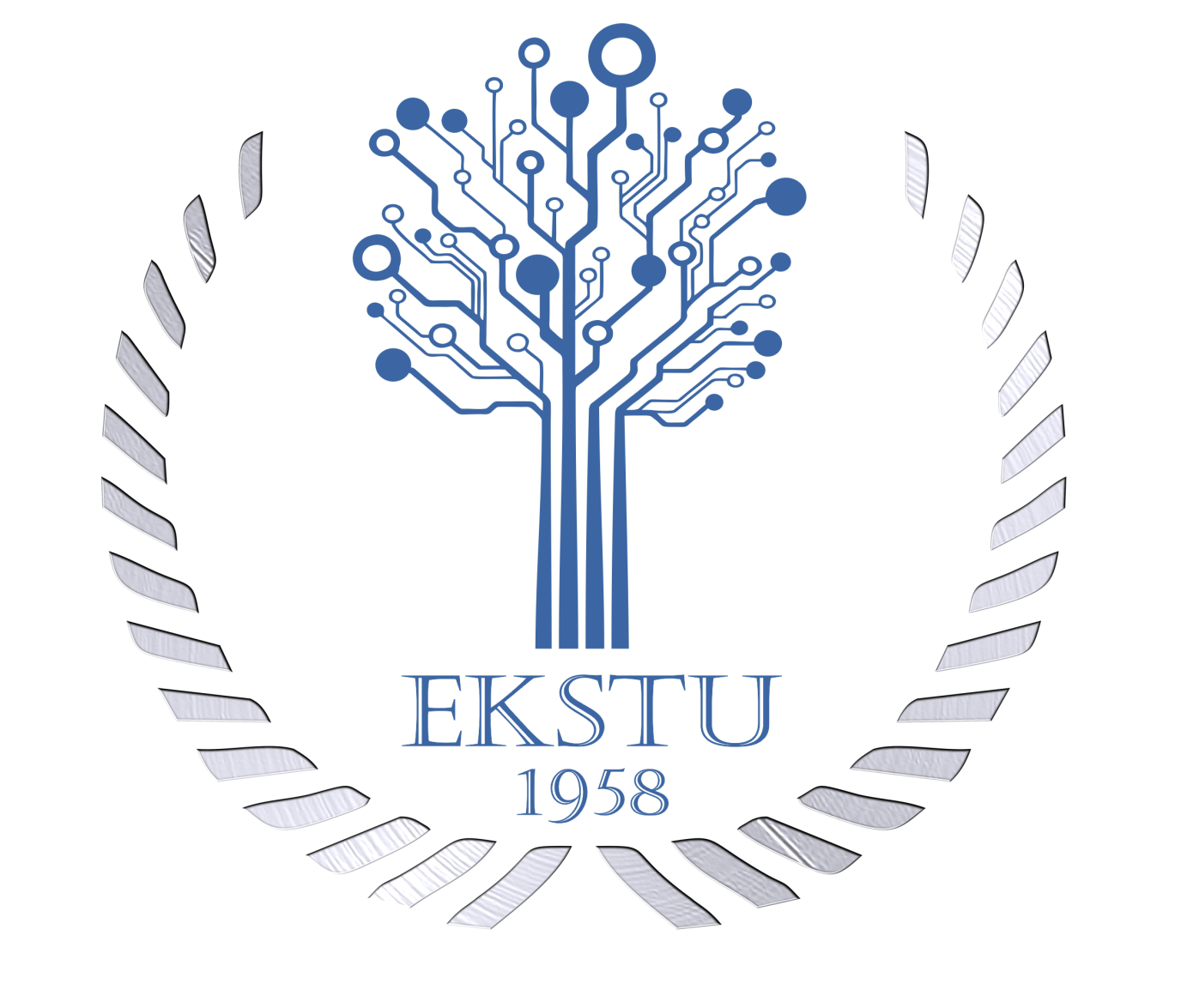
- Former names: D. Serikbayev East Kazakhstan Technical University, EKTU, East Kazakhstan Technical University, Ust-Kamenogorskij stroitelno-dorozhnyj institut, (UKSDI)
- Type: University
- Established: 1958
- Rector: Zhassulan Kudaibergenovich Shaimardanov
- Academic staff: ~ 515
- Students: ~ 6 146
- Location: 69 Protozanov Street Oskemen, Kazakhstan 49°57′26.40″N 82°35′28.50″E, Oskemen
- Campus: Urban
- Language: Kazakh, Russian, English
- Website: www.ektu.kz

University rankings

Regional – Overall
- QS Asia: =288 (2025)
- QS Emerging Europe and Central Asia: 167 (2022)

D. Serikbayev East Kazakhstan Technical University (Kazakh: Дәулет Серікбаев атындағы Шығыс Қазақстан техникалық университеті, Däulet Serıkbaev atyndağy Şyğys Qazaqstan tehnikalyq universitetı; Russian: Восточно-Казахстанский технический университет имени Даулета Серикбаева) is located in Oskemen, Kazakhstan.

Founded in 1958 as Ust-Kamenogorskij stroitelno-dorozhnyj institut, UKSDI (literally: Ust-Kamenogorsk Road Construction Institute), the university is named after the first rector Serikbayev Daulet Mirkasymovich, a public figure and social activist who ensured the status of a leading science and technology university.

According to the Republican Ranking Agency, the university is ranked second among technical universities of Kazakhstan. The D. Serikbayev EKTU is the only university in Kazakhstan preparing specialists for the nuclear industry. Additionally, it is the only university in Kazakhstan that received a large amount of state funding for ongoing scientific research and development projects.

As of May 2019, the university consists of three schools, six faculties, a military sub-department, and Higher IT College. As of 2018, the total number of students enrolled is over 6,000. The D. Serikbayev EKTU offers 81 educational programs at the bachelor's, master's, and doctorate levels, in addition to 20 experimental programs. In the framework of the Shanghai Cooperation University, there are dual-degree programs in IT, economics, management, instrument engineering, and geodesy. The D. Serikbayev EKTU has 63 industrial partnerships in such companies as Kazzinc, Ulba Metallurgical Plant, Azia Avto, Vnitsvetmet, and 1C-Rating.

In addition to the Center of Advanced Development “VERITAS”, which develops new types of products for major enterprises of the East Kazakhstan region, leading scientists of the university work on research projects with applications in IT, mechanical engineering, solar energy, the agro-industrial complex, and other areas.

== Notable alumni ==
Alumni of the D. Serikbayev East Kazakhstan Technical University (D. Serikbayev East Kazakhstan Technical University, East Kazakhstan Technical University, Ust-Kamenogorskij stroitelno-dorozhnyj institute) include:

Sukhorukova Vera Nikolayevna - honorary citizen of Ust-Kamenogorsk, a member of the Majilis of the Republic of Kazakhstan

Mussin Kairat Maratovich – Chair of the “International Charitable Fund “Tolegetay” Public Foundation

Saylaubayev Seilzhan Zhiryenevich – General Director of LLP “Corporation “Vostok-Moloko”

Buktugumov Shakarym Sabyrovich – chairman of the Board of JSC “Regional Center of Government-Private Partnership of the East Kazakhstan Region”

Urazbayev Kairat Nazarovich – Head of the Department of the Committee for Regulation of Natural Monopolies and Protection of Competitions of the Ministry of the National Economy of the Republic of Kazakhstan for the East Kazakhstan region

Sizikov Nikolay Ivanovich – researcher in the field of construction, candidate of technical sciences

Tsvetkova Tatyana Ivanovna – chair of the Board of the Association of Business Women of Ust-Kamenogorsk

Baybatchin Ertay Aubakirovich – Chair of Ust-Kamenogorsk State Representation of “Nur Otan”.

Mukhamgaliyev Shalkar Kayroshevich – artist, singer, entertainer, participant of numerous KVN shows.

== Organization ==
As of May 2019, the university consists of three schools, six faculties, military sub-department, and Higher IT College. Classes are taught by nearly 500 qualified instructors, including over 200 doctors and candidates of science, professors, and associate professors. The majority of educational programs are taught in Kazakh and Russian. Teaching in English is provided for several programs throughout the university at Bachelor's, Master's, and doctorate levels. The full list can be found on the English-language website of the university. There is a foundation program available for students of foreign Kazakh Diaspora and foreign citizens to enter the university, to help them to adapt and develop necessary skills.

Academic units

- International technology post-graduate school Oskemen
- Faculty of Architecture and Civil Engineering
- Faculty of Engineering
- Faculty of Earth Sciences
- Faculty of Energy
- Department of Liberal Arts
- School of Information Technology
- School of Business and Entrepreneurship
- Military Sub-Department
- Foundation Faculty
- Higher IT College

== History ==
The university is the first in the Republic of Kazakhstan to develop a model of interaction between industries and university research. Jointly with leading mining and metallurgical companies, the university is working on increasing the share of high-tech production, environmental friendliness of enterprises, and productivity. The D. Serikbayev EKTU has such research projects as “Development of high technology production of materials for medical purpose from refractory metals of tantalum and niobium and their alloys” and “Development of technology and production of samples of superconducting wire for MRI”, jointly with JSC “Ulba Metallurgical Plant”, among others.

== Soviet period ==
Ust-Kamenogorskij stroitelno-dorozhnyj institut (UKSDI) was created by the Order of the Council of Ministers of the USSR No. 866 dated 5 August 1958 and the Order of the Council of Ministers of the Kazakh SSR No. 765 dated 30 August 1958.

Creation of the technical university in the East Kazakhstan region was objectively predetermined by rapid economic development of East Kazakhstan and the acute need for engineers and technicians for its industries. The region was a center of such industries as the metals industries (nonferrous metallurgy), mechanical engineering, instrument engineering, and mining. By the end of the 1980s, Ust-Kamenogorsk became the largest industrial and cultural center of the Republic. In 1991, the city became a regional center of the East Kazakhstan oblast of the independent state Republic of Kazakhstan.

== 21st century ==
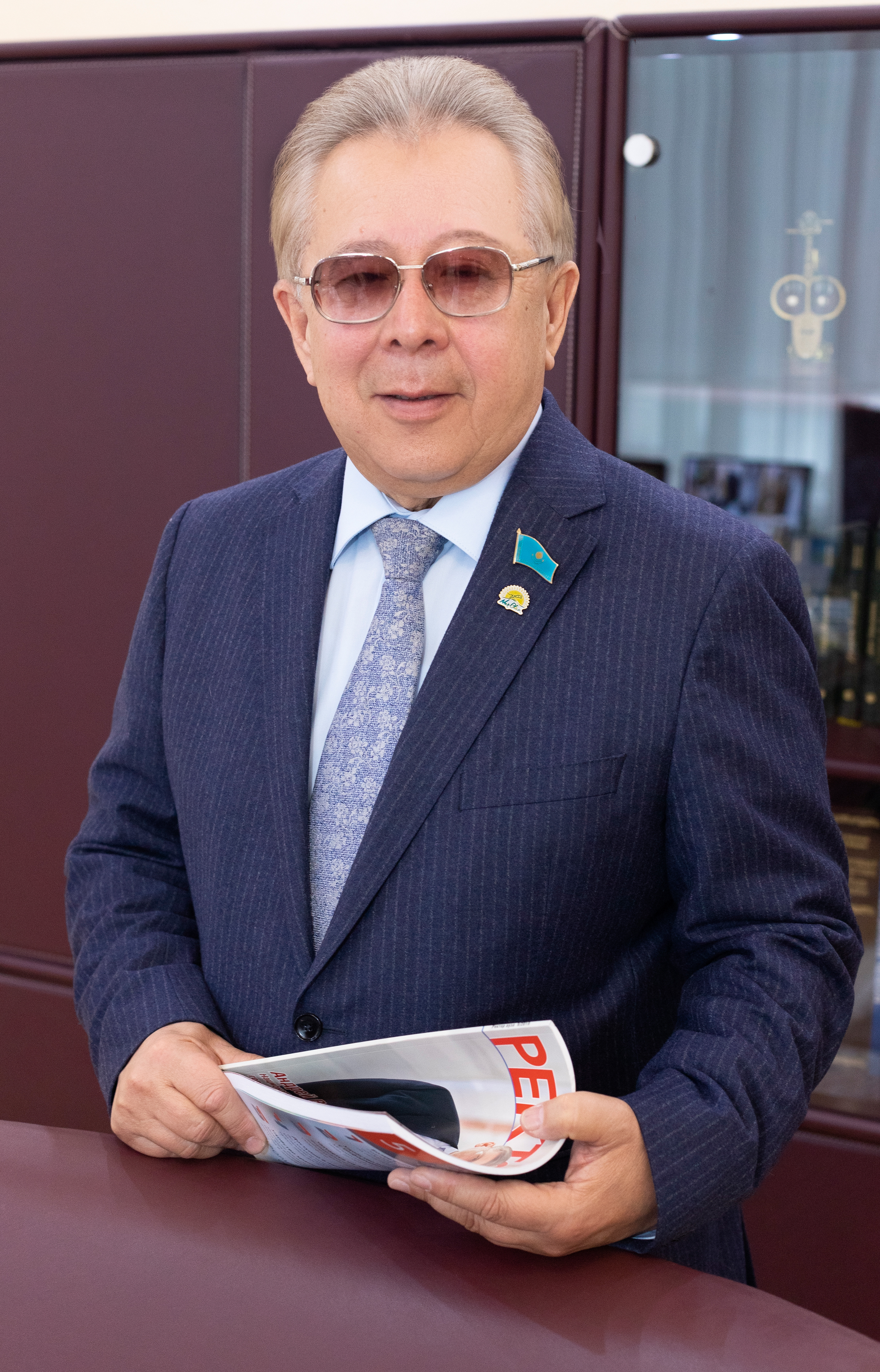
Rector Prof. Shaimardanov

On 7 May 1996, UKSDI was reorganized into the East Kazakhstan Technical University by the Order of the Government of the Republic of Kazakhstan No. 573. After the university issued a petition, it was named after Daulet Serikbayev by the Order of the Republic of Kazakhstan No. 1485 dated 3 November 1997. Since 2001, the university is called the D. Serikbayev East Kazakhstan State Technical University.

Starting from 2015, the Rector of the D. Serikbayev East Kazakhstan Technical University is Professor Shaimardanov Zhassulan Kudaibergenovich, Doctor of biological sciences, academic of the Academy of Pedagogical Sciences of the Republic of Kazakhstan.

According to Prof. Zh. Shaimardanov, the university's character can be explained by the triad “Traditions, innovations, and success!” The university is shifting emphasis from traditional academics towards industry-oriented training and forming an experience of entrepreneurship and innovative activity. The university's research groups consists of students at Bachelor's, Master's, and doctorate levels. The university is oriented towards serving orders of the region's industries. Moreover, the educational programs take into account the fact that after the students graduate and come to the industries to work, there will be equipment modernized by the Industry 4.0 Standard.

In 2020, D. Serikbayev EKTU won the prestigious award “Leader of Science - Web of Science Awards” in the category “Top regional universities”.

== Campus ==
EKTU is located in Studgorodok, which is near the Republic Square and Akimat of East Kazakhstan Region in the center of Ust-Kamenogorsk.

East Kazakhstan is located in the region called Rudny Altai, which means “Ore Altai”. Modern Ust-Kamenogorsk is the center of the metallurgy of non-ferrous metals of Kazakhstan.

The main building was designed by Anatoly Konstantinovich Sidorov. Construction of the building was completed in 1965. A.K. Sidorov designed the entire Studgorogok, including educational buildings, student dormitories, sports facilities, canteen, and residential buildings for faculty. He became rector of the university in 1962.

There are 12 teaching and laboratory buildings.

Non-resident students are provided with places in dormitories, where there are classrooms, assembly halls, lunchrooms, and internet rooms. Students have the opportunity to work for the student organization "Zhasyl El".

As of 2017, there are three student dormitories with the capacity to host over 1100 students, a library, a museum, five canteens, five medical centers, sports fields, and the “Prostor” Sports and Fitness Camp near Bukhtarma reservoir.

== Scientific and innovative infrastructure ==
Scientific and innovative infrastructure of the university consists of 21 laboratories, eight centers, three institutions, and five pilot production sites.

“IRGETAS” is a common use center for carrying out analytic and materials engineering research. Chemical and physical characteristics of samples are studied and analyzed by the center.

“Building Technologies” is created for the inspection of buildings, structures, and highways, and for developing new construction technology.

“Center of Excellence for Prototyping” consists of the laboratory for 3D printing and thin coatings, laboratory of material processing by CNC machines, laboratory of high-speed plasma cutting and spraying, laboratory of mechanical processing of materials, and welding laboratory. The center is equipped with high-tech systems.

“Engineering Center for Excellence” is created in order to implement projects aimed at remote sensing of the Earth and precision farming.

The Excellence Center for “Metallurgy” includes the laboratory of non-ferrous, noble, rare and dispersed metals and the laboratory of innovative technologies for mineral and technogenic raw materials mining and processing.

== Library ==
Scientific library of the D. Serikbayev East Kazakhstan Technical University is one of the largest technical libraries of the university level on the territory of the Republic of Kazakhstan. Its current stock is over 1 million items.

All bibliographical processes are being carried out on the basis of automation system IBRIS-64+ with the use of RFID-technologies. Within the framework of the trilingual education program, the library is being actively supplemented with publications in English.

The library has a unique collection of rare books of the XVIII-XX centuries.

The library is adopting to the model of a “co-working library”, which is a mobile space for learning, gathering, and event hosting for students to support their entrepreneurial and creative projects and leisure with friends.

== The “Great Altai” Museum ==
On 7 December 2018, the “Great Altai” Museum was opened, in the framework of the “Rukhani Zhangyru” Program. The museum presents concepts of ancient metallurgical processes of the East Kazakhstan, located in the region called Rudny Altai, which means “Ore Altai”. Total area of the museum is over 200 square meters, and there are over 3 thousand items.

== Global Cooperation ==
The D. Serikbayev EKTU is a member of such international higher education organizations as the European University Association, International Association of Universities, Association of Asian Universities, Eurasian Network University, University of the Shanghai Cooperation Organization, and Rector Council of Grand Altai Universities. In 2018, the Rector of the D. Serikbayev EKTU Prof. Shaimardanov was elected as the vice-president of the Association of Asian Universities.

The university is implementing ongoing contracts to invite leading scientist from universities near and far abroad, in the framework of the program “Promotion of foreign scientists and consultants in the leading universities of Kazakhstan” by the Ministry of Education and Science of the Republic of Kazakhstan.

The university offers several “Dual Diploma” – “Dual Degree” programs with the following universities: ITMO, Moscow Institute of Steel and Alloys, Novosibirsk State Technical University, TUSUR, and Siberian State University of Geosystems and Technologies.

The university also launched a number of innovative educational programs, including “Additive Technologies”, “Augmented and Virtual Reality”, “Digital Earth Exploration Methods”, “Precision Farming”, with participation of the Technical University of Munich, Obuda University, Tomsk Polytechnic University, and other foreign partners.

Active work is carried out on international mobility of students, teachers and researchers on international exchange programs: DAAD (Germany), British Council (United Kingdom), Bolashak (Kazakhstan), “Sustainable Resource Development” (Japan). Undergraduates may intern in leading technical universities in Germany, USA, Poland, and Russia.

The university has the Foundation Faculty, which is an intensive academic, scientific, and language preparation of students for bachelor's programs. The objectives of the faculty are to organize and conduct educational work with foreign students, introduce them to the university's way of life, traditions, customs and culture of different peoples, internal regulations of the educational establishment, and laws and normative acts of the Republic of Kazakhstan.
