= Almaty University of Power Engineering and Telecommunications =

Almaty University of Power Engineering and Telecommunications (AUPET) (Kazakh: Алматы Энергетика және байланыс университеті, Almaty İenergetika jäne bailanys universitetı) is a technical engineering university in Almaty, Kazakhstan. It is located at 126 Baitursynov Street in Almaty and has around 4,000 students. It is one of the best-known universities in the field of power engineering and telecommunications in the Central Asian region. Students from all over central Asia study there. They live in three campuses with Wi-Fi internet access, video cassette record, online library and recreation facilities.

AUPET is building a third educational case with a new modern athletic field. Undergraduate students can receive a second bachelor's degree in economics from the Moscow Power Engineering Institute simultaneously with studying at AUPET.

== Faculties ==
AUPET has four full-time faculties:

- Power engineering
- Electrical engineering
- Telecommunications
- Information Technologies
