= Karaganda Medical University =

Medical training university in Karagandy, Kazakhstan

- Қарағанды медицина университеті
- Type: Public University
- Established: 1950
- Rector: Bakhyt Kosherova
- Location: Karaganda, Kazakhstan
- Colours: Blue White

Karaganda Medical University (Kazakh: Қарағанды медицина университеті, romanized: Qarağandy meditsina universitetı) is a medical university in Karaganda, Kazakhstan. It was established in 1950.

Currently, the University implements the multi-level training of specialists: bachelor program, postgraduate (master's course, residency, PhD program) and additional education. Training is provided in Kazakh, Russian and English languages. Over 8 thousand students study at the University.

== Structure ==
Faculties:

- School of Medicine
- School of Dentistry
- School of Pharmacy
- School of Public Health
- School of Nursing education
- Institute of Life Sciences
- School of Residency and Professional Development

== Rectors ==
- 1950-1974 - Pospelov Pyotr Moiseevich
- 1974-1984 - Filin Alexander Petrovich
- 1984-1989 - Khlopov Nikolai Arkhipovich
- 1989-2001 - AliyakparovMakash Tynyshtykbaevich
- 2001-2009 - Kulmagambetov Ilyas Raykhanovich
- 2009-2011 - Teleuov Murat Koishibaevich
- 2011-2021 - Dosmagambetova Raushan Sultanovna
- 2022-2025 - Anar Akylbekovna Turmukhambetova
- From 2025 - Bakhyt Nurgalievna Kosherova
