= Arman Dunayev =

Kazakhstani politician (born 1966)

- Арман Дунаев

Minister of Finance of Kazakhstan
- In office 4 April 2004 – 19 January 2006
- President: Nursultan Nazarbayev
- Preceded by: Yerbolat Dosayev
- Succeeded by: Natalya Korzhova

Personal details
- Born: 7 October 1966 Kerbulak District, Alma-Ata Oblast, Kazakh SSR, Soviet Union
- Profession: Politician; economist

Arman Ğaliasqarūly Dunaev (Note: Often transliterated as Arman Galiaskarovich Dunayev through a Russified Romanization of Арман Галиаскарович Дунаев.) (Kazakh: Арман Ғалиасқарұлы Дунаев; born 7 October 1966) is a Kazakh politician who served as the Finance Minister of Kazakhstan from 2004 to 2006. He replaced Erbolat Dosaev on 5 April 2004.
