= Agrarianism =

Philosophy supporting rural society

Agrarianism is a social and political philosophy that advocates for rural development, a rural agricultural lifestyle, family farming, widespread property ownership, and political decentralization. Those who adhere to agrarianism tend to value traditional forms of local community over urban modernity. Agrarian political parties sometimes aim to support the rights and sustainability of small farmers and poor peasants against the wealthy, powerful and famous in society.

== Philosophy ==
Some scholars suggest that agrarianism espouses the superiority of rural society to urban society and the independent farmer as superior to the paid worker, and sees farming as a way of life that can shape the ideal social values. It stresses the superiority of a simpler rural life in comparison to the complexity of urban life. For example, M. Thomas Inge defines agrarianism by the following basic tenets:

- Farming is the sole occupation that offers total independence and self-sufficiency.
- Urban life, capitalism, and technology destroy independence and dignity and foster vice and weakness.
- The agricultural community, with its fellowship of labor and co-operation, is the model society.
- The farmer has a solid, stable position in the world order. They have "a sense of identity, a sense of historical and religious tradition, a feeling of belonging to a concrete family, place, and region, which are psychologically and culturally beneficial." The harmony of their life checks the encroachments of a fragmented, alienated modern society.
- Cultivation of the soil "has within it a positive spiritual good" and from it the cultivator acquires the virtues of "honor, manliness, self-reliance, courage, moral integrity, and hospitality." They result from a direct contact with nature and, through nature, a closer relationship to God. The agrarian is blessed in that they follow the example of God in creating order out of chaos.

== History ==
The philosophical roots of agrarianism include European and Chinese philosophers. The Chinese school of Agriculturalism (农家/農家) was a philosophy that advocated peasant utopian communalism and egalitarianism. In societies influenced by Confucianism that had as its foundation that humans are innately good, the farmer was considered an esteemed productive member of society, but merchants who made money were looked down upon. That influenced European intellectuals like François Quesnay, an avid Confucianist and advocate of China's agrarian policies, in forming the French agrarian philosophy of physiocracy. The physiocrats, along with the ideas of John Locke and the Romantic Era, formed the basis of modern European and American agrarianism.

== Types of agrarianism ==
=== Physiocracy ===
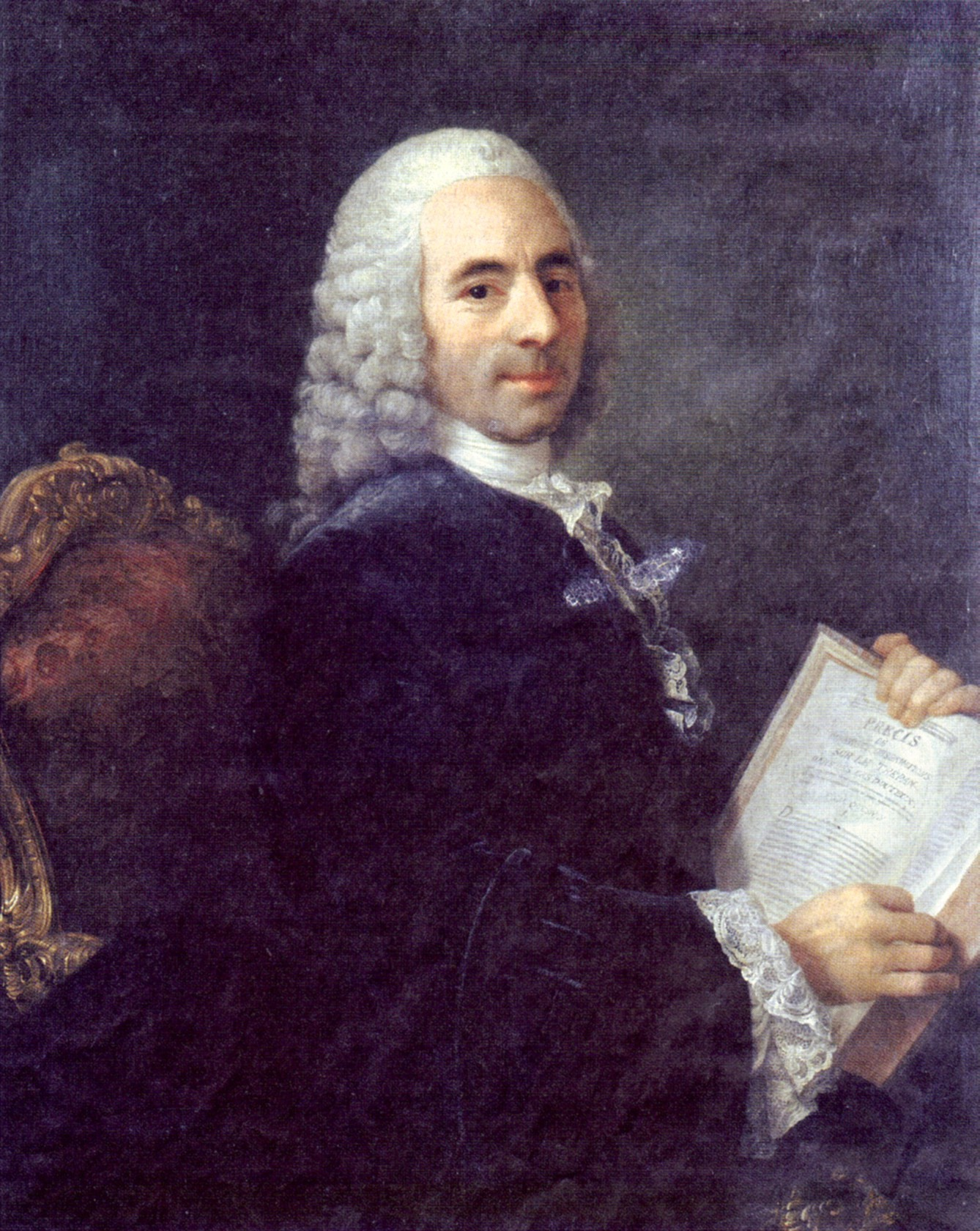
François Quesnay, a physician who is considered the founding father of physiocracy, published the "Tableau économique" (Economic Table) in 1758

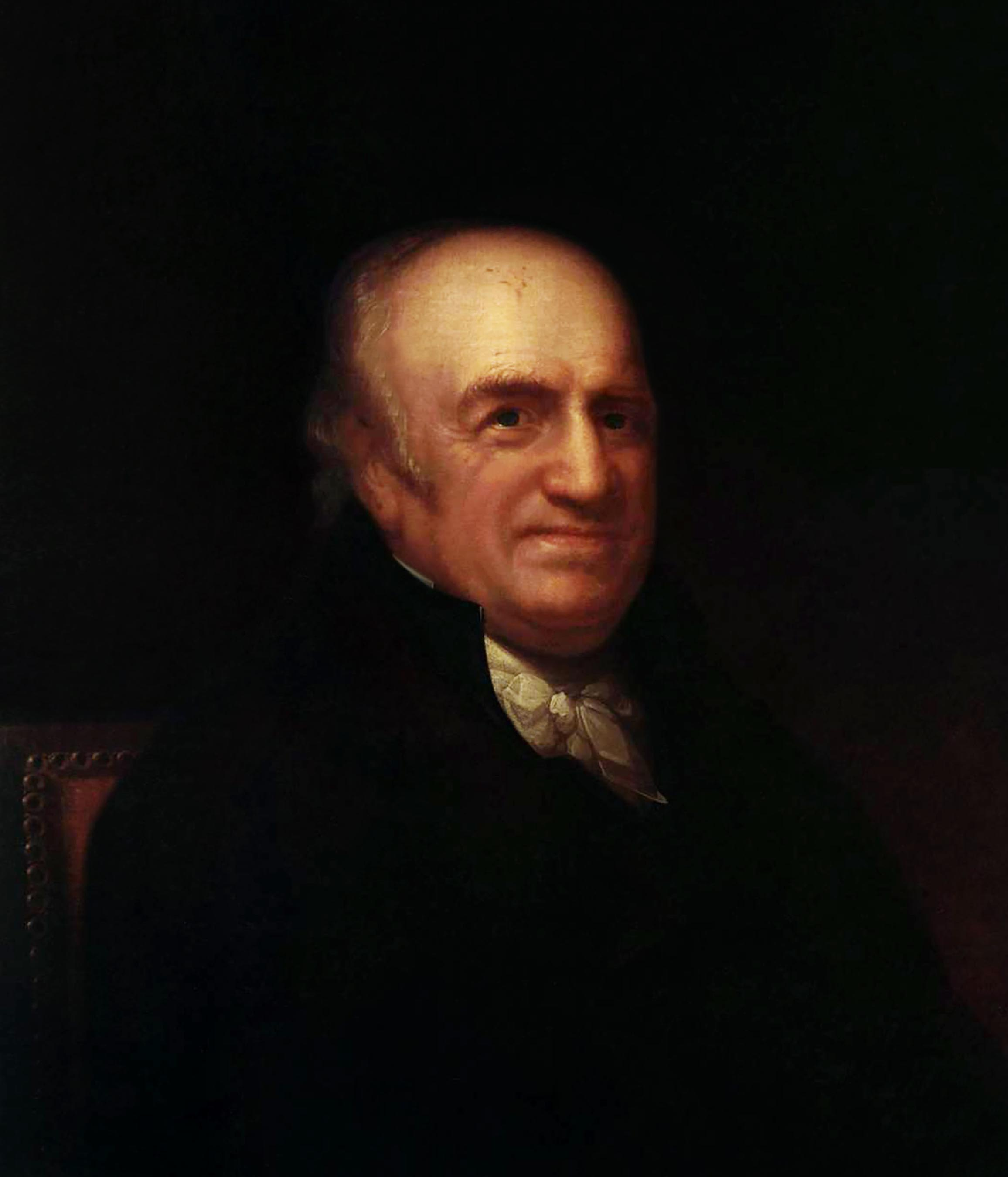
Pierre Samuel du Pont de Nemours, a prominent physiocrat. In his book La Physiocratie, du Pont advocated low tariffs and free trade.

Physiocracy (French: physiocratie; from the Greek for "government of nature") is an economic theory developed by a group of 18th-century Age of Enlightenment French economists. They believed that the wealth of nations derived solely from the value of "land agriculture" or "land development" and that agricultural products should be highly priced. Their theories originated in France and were most popular during the second half of the 18th century. Physiocracy became one of the first well-developed theories of economics. Physiocratic governments made significant positive influence on national economies by developing land for agricultural use, building roads and canals for agricultural trade and utilizing trade as a mechanism for benefiting from surplus agricultural produce; strengthening currencies and balance of payments. It is thus today known as an unintended means to an end.

François Quesnay (1694–1774), the Marquis de Mirabeau (1715–1789) and Anne-Robert-Jacques Turgot (1727–1781) dominated the movement, which immediately preceded the first modern school, classical economics, which began with the publication of Adam Smith's The Wealth of Nations in 1776.

The physiocrats made a significant contribution in their emphasis on productive work as the source of national wealth. This contrasted with earlier schools, in particular mercantilism, which often focused on the ruler's wealth, accumulation of gold, or the balance of trade. Whereas the mercantilist school of economics held that value in the products of society was created at the point of sale, by the seller exchanging his products for more money than the products had "previously" been worth, the physiocratic school of economics was the first to see labor as the sole source of value. For the physiocrats, however, only agricultural labor created this value in the products of society. All "industrial" and non-agricultural labors were "unproductive appendages" to agricultural labor.

Quesnay was likely influenced by his medical training, particularly by the work of William Harvey who explained how blood flow and the circulatory system is vital to the human body; Quesnay held that the circulation of wealth was vital to the economy. Societies at the time were also overwhelmingly agrarian. This may be why they viewed agriculture as the primary source of a nation's wealth. This is an idea that Quesnay purported to demonstrate with data, comparing a workshop to a farm. He analyzed "how money flowed between the three classes of farmers, proprietors, and artisans, in the same mechanical way that blood flows between different organs" and claimed only the farm produced a surplus that added to the nation's wealth. Physiocrats viewed the production of goods and services as equivalent to the consumption of the agricultural surplus, since human or animal muscle provided the main source of power and all energy derived from the surplus from agricultural production. Profit in capitalist production was really only the "rent" obtained by the owner of the land on which the agricultural production took place.

"The physiocrats damned cities for their artificiality and praised what they considered to be more natural styles of living. They celebrated farmers." They called themselves les Économistes, but are generally referred to as "physiocrats" to distinguish their beliefs from the many schools of economic thought that followed.

=== Jeffersonian democracy ===
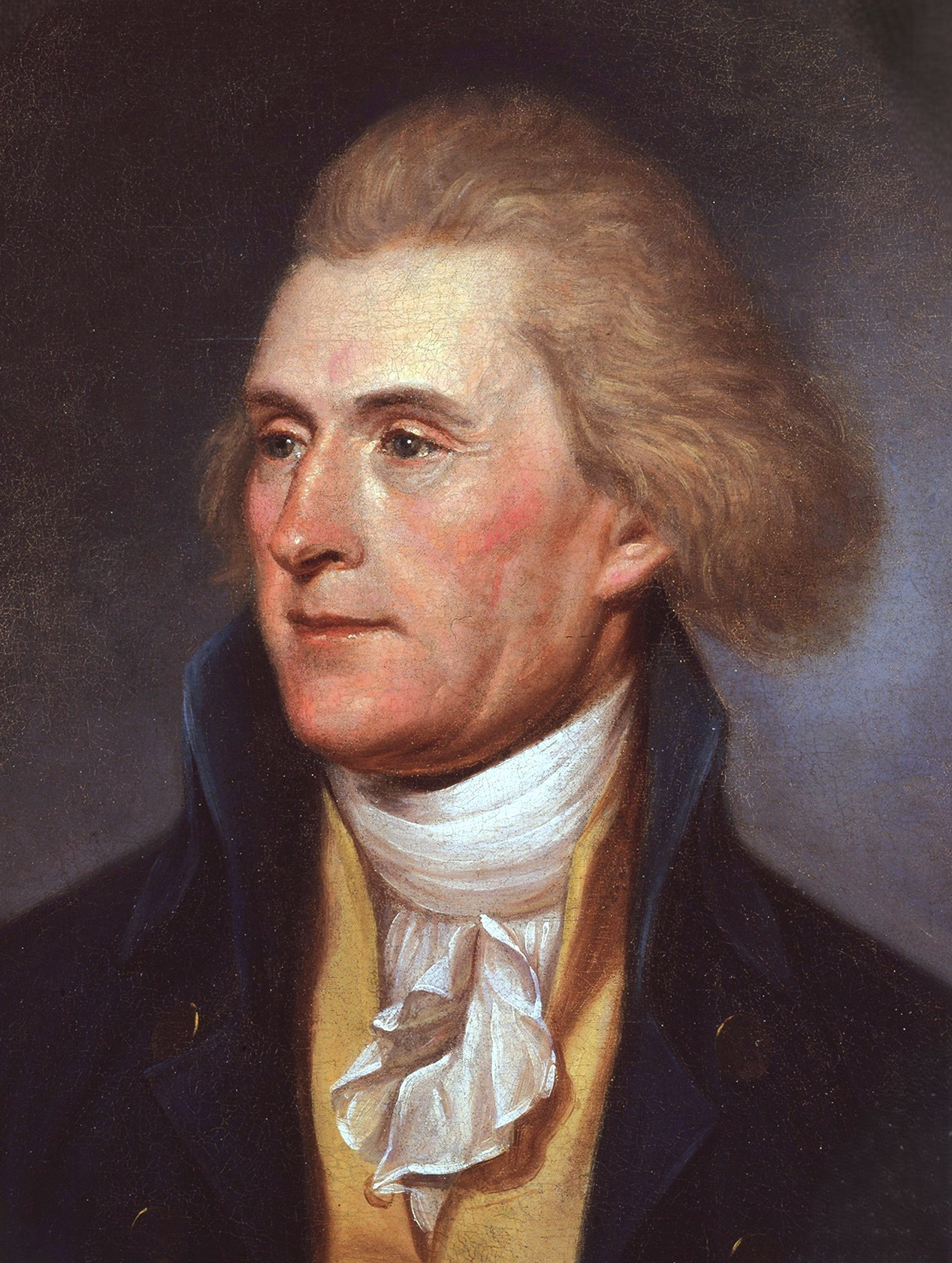
Thomas Jefferson and his supporters idealised farmers as the citizens that the American Republic should be formed around.

The United States president Thomas Jefferson was an agrarian who based his ideas about the budding American democracy around the notion that farmers are "the most valuable citizens" and the truest republicans. Jefferson and his support base were committed to American republicanism, which they saw as being in opposition to monarchy, aristocracy, clericalism and corruption, and which prioritized morality and virtue, exemplified by the "yeoman farmer", "planters", and the "plain folk". In praising the rural farmfolk, the Jeffersonians felt that financiers, bankers and industrialists created "cesspools of corruption" in the cities and should thus be avoided.

The Jeffersonians sought to align the American economy more with agriculture than industry. Part of their motive to do so was Jefferson's fear that the over-industrialization of America would create a class of wage slaves who relied on their employers for income and sustenance. In turn, these workers would cease to be independent voters as their vote could be manipulated by said employers. To counter this, Jefferson introduced, as scholar Clay Jenkinson noted, "a graduated income tax that would serve as a disincentive to vast accumulations of wealth and would make funds available for some sort of benign redistribution downward" and tariffs on imported articles, which were mainly purchased by the wealthy. In 1811, Jefferson, writing to a friend, explained: "these revenues will be levied entirely on the rich... . the rich alone use imported articles, and on these alone the whole taxes of the general government are levied. the poor man ... pays not a farthing of tax to the general government, but on his salt."

There is general agreement that the substantial United States' federal policy of offering land grants (such as thousands of gifts of land to veterans) had a positive impact on economic development in the 19th century.

=== Agrarian socialism ===
Agrarian socialism is a form of agrarianism that is anti-capitalist in nature and seeks to introduce socialist economic systems in their stead.

==== Zapatismo ====
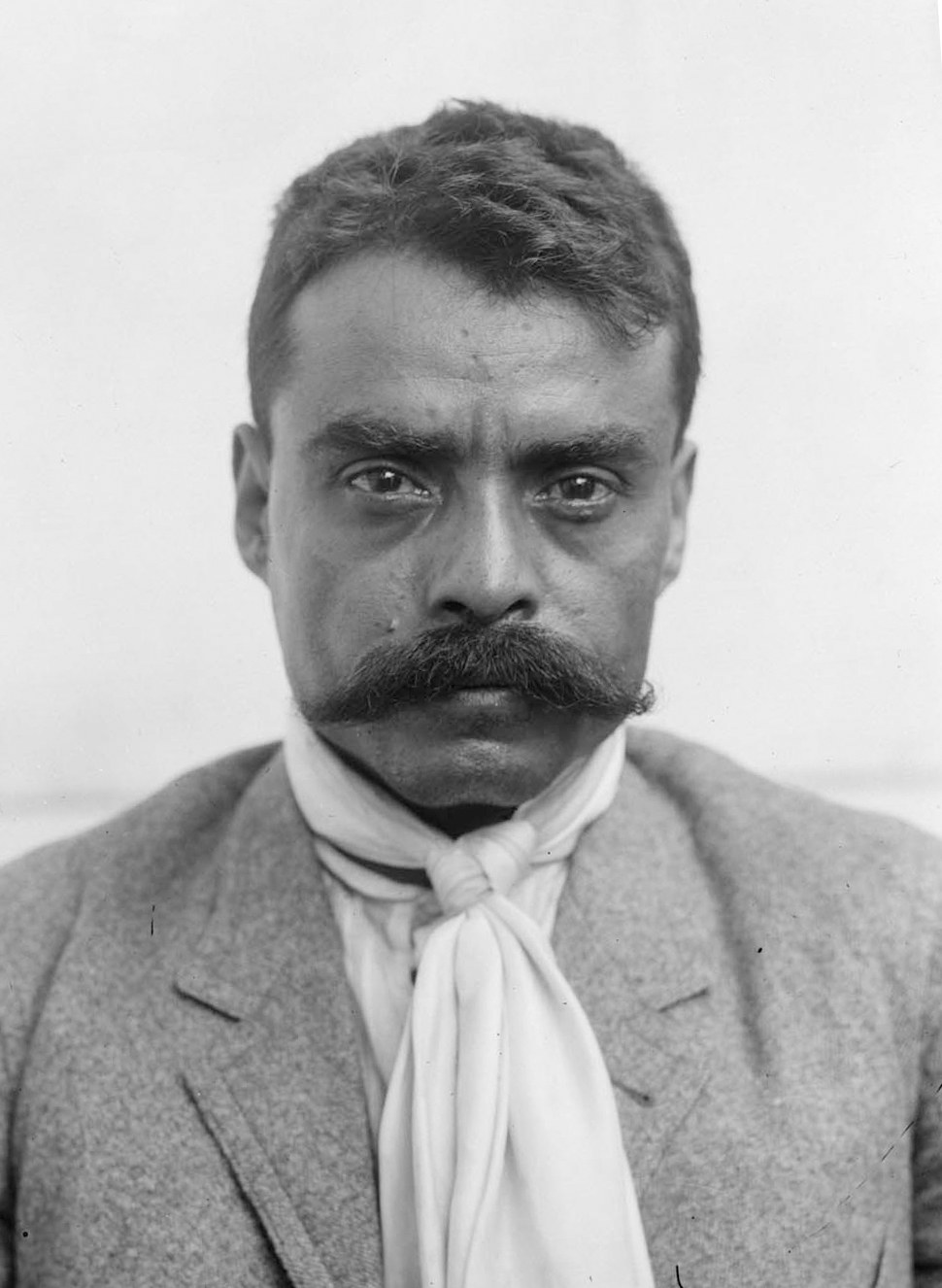
Emiliano Zapata fought in the Mexican Revolution in the name of the Mexican peasants and sought to introduce reforms such as land redistribution.

One notable agrarian socialists was Emiliano Zapata, a leading figure in the Mexican Revolution. As the leader of the Liberation Army of the South, his group of revolutionaries fought on behalf of the Mexican peasants, whom they saw as exploited by the landowning classes. Zapata published the Plan of Ayala, which called for significant land reforms and land redistribution in Mexico as part of the revolution. Zapata was killed and his forces crushed over the course of the Revolution, but his political ideas lived on in the form of Zapatismo.

Zapatismo would form the basis for neozapatismo, the ideology of the modern Zapatista Army of National Liberation. Known as Ejército Zapatista de Liberación Nacional or EZLN in Spanish, EZLN is a far-left, libertarian socialist political and militant group that emerged in the state of Chiapas in southmost Mexico in 1994. EZLN and Neozapatismo, as explicit in their name, seek to revive the agrarian socialist movement of Zapata, but fuse it with new elements such as a commitment to indigenous rights and community-level decision making.

Subcommander Marcos, a leading member of the movement, argues that the peoples' collective ownership of the land was and is the basis for all subsequent developments the movement sought to create:

...When the land became property of the peasants ... when the land passed into the hands of those who work it ... [This was] the starting point for advances in government, health, education, housing, nutrition, women's participation, trade, culture, communication, and information ...[it was] recovering the means of production, in this case, the land, animals, and machines that were in the hands of large property owners."

==== Maoism ====
Maoism, the far-left ideology of Mao Zedong and his followers, places a heavy emphasis on the role of peasants in its goals. In contrast to other Marxist schools of thought which normally seek to acquire the support of urban workers, Maoism sees the peasantry as key. Believing that "political power grows out of the barrel of a gun", Maoism saw the Chinese Peasantry as the prime source for a Marxist vanguard because it possessed two qualities: (i) they were poor, and (ii) they were a political blank slate; in Mao's words, "A clean sheet of paper has no blotches, and so the newest and most beautiful words can be written on it". During the Chinese Civil War and the Second Sino-Japanese War, Mao and the Chinese Communist Party made extensive use of peasants and rural bases in their military tactics, often eschewing the cities.

Following the eventual victory of the Communist Party in both wars, the countryside and how it should be run remained a focus for Mao. In 1958, Mao launched the Great Leap Forward, a social and economic campaign which, amongst other things, altered many aspects of rural Chinese life. It introduced mandatory collective farming and forced the peasantry to organize itself into communal living units which were known as people's communes. These communes, which consisted of 5,000 people on average, were expected to meet high production quotas while the peasants who lived on them adapted to this radically new way of life. The communes were run as co-operatives where wages and money were replaced by work points. Peasants who criticised this new system were persecuted as "rightists" and "counter-revolutionaries". Leaving the communes was forbidden and escaping from them was difficult or impossible, and those who attempted it were subjected to party-orchestrated "public struggle sessions," which further jeopardized their survival. These public criticism sessions were often used to intimidate the peasants into obeying local officials and they often devolved into little more than public beatings.

On the communes, experiments were conducted in order to find new methods of planting crops, efforts were made to construct new irrigation systems on a massive scale, and the communes were all encouraged to produce steel backyard furnaces as part of an effort to increase steel production. However, following the Anti-Rightist Campaign, Mao had instilled a mass distrust of intellectuals into China, and thus engineers often were not consulted with regard to the new irrigation systems and the wisdom of asking untrained peasants to produce good quality steel from scrap iron was not publicly questioned. Similarly, the experimentation with the crops did not produce results. In addition to this the Four Pests Campaign was launched, in which the peasants were called upon to destroy sparrows and other wild birds that ate crop seeds, in order to protect fields. Pest birds were shot down or scared away from landing until they dropped from exhaustion. This campaign resulted in an ecological disaster that saw an explosion of the vermin population, especially crop-eating insects, which was consequently not in danger of being killed by predators.

None of these new systems were working, but local leaders did not dare to state this, instead, they falsified reports so as not to be punished for failing to meet the quotas. In many cases they stated that they were greatly exceeding their quotas, and in turn, the Chinese state developed a completely false sense of success with regard to the commune system.

All of this culminated in the Great Chinese Famine, which began in 1959, lasted 3 years, and saw an estimated 15 to 30 million Chinese people die. A combination of bad weather and the new, failed farming techniques that were introduced by the state led to massive shortages of food. By 1962, the Great Leap Forward was declared to be at an end.

In the late 1960s and early 1970s, Mao once again radically altered life in rural China with the launching of the Down to the Countryside Movement. As a response to the Great Chinese Famine, the Chinese President Liu Shaoqi began "sending down" urban youths to rural China in order to recover its population losses and alleviate overcrowding in the cities. However, Mao turned the practice into a political crusade, declaring that the sending down would strip the youth of any bourgeois tendencies by forcing them to learn from the unprivileged rural peasants. In reality, it was the Communist Party's attempt to reign in the Red Guards, who had become uncontrollable during the course of the Cultural Revolution. 10% of the 1970 urban population of China was sent out to remote rural villages, often in Inner Mongolia. The villages, which were still poorly recovering from the effects of the Great Chinese Famine, did not have the excess resources that were needed to support the newcomers. Furthermore, the so-called "sent-down youth" had no agricultural experience and as a result, they were unaccustomed to the harsh lifestyle that existed in the countryside, and their unskilled labor in the villages provided little benefit to the agricultural sector. As a result, many of the sent-down youth died in the countryside. The relocation of the youths was originally intended to be permanent, but by the end of the Cultural Revolution, the Communist Party relented and some of those who had the capacity to return to the cities were allowed to do so.

In imitation of Mao's policies, the Khmer Rouge of Cambodia (who were heavily funded and supported by the People's Republic of China) created their own version of the Great Leap Forward which was known as "Maha Lout Ploh". With the Great Leap Forward as its model, it had similarly disastrous effects, contributing to what is now known as the Cambodian genocide. As a part of the Maha Lout Ploh, the Khmer Rouge sought to create an entirely agrarian socialist society by forcibly relocating 100,000 people to move from Cambodia's cities into newly created communes. The Khmer Rouge leader, Pol Pot sought to "purify" the country by setting it back to "Year Zero", freeing it from "corrupting influences". Besides trying to completely de-urbanize Cambodia, ethnic minorities were slaughtered along with anyone else who was suspected of being a "reactionary" or a member of the "bourgeoisie", to the point that wearing glasses was seen as grounds for execution. The killings were only brought to an end when Cambodia was invaded by the neighboring socialist nation of Vietnam, whose army toppled the Khmer Rouge. However, with Cambodia's entire society and economy in disarray, including its agricultural sector, the country still plunged into renewed famine due to vast food shortages. However, as international journalists began to report on the situation and send images of it out to the world, a massive international response was provoked, leading to one of the most concentrated relief efforts of its time.

== Notable agrarian parties ==
Peasant parties first appeared across Eastern Europe between 1860 and 1910, when commercialized agriculture and world market forces disrupted traditional rural society, and the railway and growing literacy facilitated the work of roving organizers. Agrarian parties advocated land reforms to redistribute land on large estates among those who work it. They also wanted village cooperatives to keep the profit from crop sales in local hands and credit institutions to underwrite needed improvements. Many peasant parties were also nationalist parties because peasants often worked their land for the benefit of landlords of different ethnicity.

Peasant parties rarely had any power before World War I but some became influential in the interwar era, especially in Bulgaria and Czechoslovakia. For a while, in the 1920s and the 1930s, there was a Green International (International Agrarian Bureau) based on the peasant parties in Bulgaria, Czechoslovakia, Poland, and Serbia. It functioned primarily as an information center that spread the ideas of agrarianism and combating socialism on the left and landlords on the right and never launched any significant activities.

=== Europe ===
==== Bulgaria ====
In Bulgaria, the Bulgarian Agrarian National Union (BZNS) was organized in 1899 to resist taxes and build cooperatives. BZNS came to power in 1919 and introduced many economic, social, and legal reforms. However, conservative forces crushed BZNS in a 1923 coup and assassinated its leader, Aleksandar Stamboliyski (1879–1923). BZNS was made into a communist puppet group until 1989, when it reorganized as a genuine party.

==== Czechoslovakia ====
In Czechoslovakia, the Republican Party of Agricultural and Smallholder People often shared power in parliament as a partner in the five-party pětka coalition. The party's leader, Antonín Švehla (1873–1933), was prime minister several times. It was consistently the strongest party, forming and dominating coalitions. It moved beyond its original agrarian base to reach middle-class voters. The party was banned by the National Front after the Second World War.

==== France ====
In France, the Hunting, Fishing, Nature, Tradition party is a moderate conservative, agrarian party, reaching a peak of 4.23% in the 2002 French presidential election. It would later on become affiliated to France's main conservative party, Union for a Popular Movement. More recently, the Resistons! movement of Jean Lassalle espoused agrarianism.

==== Hungary ====
In Hungary, the first major agrarian party, the small-holders party was founded in 1908. The party became part of the government in the 1920s but lost influence in the government. A new party, the Independent Smallholders, Agrarian Workers and Civic Party was established in 1930 with a more radical program representing larger scale land redistribution initiatives. They implemented this program together with the other coalition parties after WWII. However, after 1949 the party was outlawed when a one-party system was introduced. They became part of the government again 1990–1994, and 1998–2002 after which they lost political support. The ruling Fidesz party has an agrarian faction, and promotes agrarian interest since 2010 with the emphasis now placed on supporting larger family farms versus small-holders.

==== Ireland ====
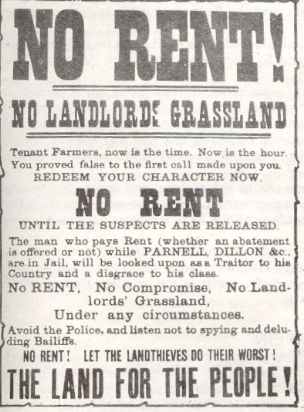
Land League poster

In the late 19th century, the Irish National Land League aimed to abolish landlordism in Ireland and enable tenant farmers to own the land they worked on. The "Land War" of 1878–1909 led to the Irish Land Acts, ending absentee landlords and ground rent and redistributing land among peasant farmers.

Post-independence, the Farmers' Party operated in the Irish Free State from 1922, folding into the National Centre Party in 1932. It was mostly supported by wealthy farmers in the east of Ireland.

Clann na Talmhan (Family of the Land; also called the National Agricultural Party) was founded in 1938. They focused more on the poor smallholders of the west, supporting land reclamation, afforestation, social democracy and rates reform. They formed part of the governing coalition of the Government of the 13th Dáil and Government of the 15th Dáil. Economic improvement in the 1960s saw farmers vote for other parties and Clann na Talmhan disbanded in 1965.

==== Kazakhstan ====
In Kazakhstan, the Peasants' Union, originally a communist organization, was formed as one of first agrarian parties in independent Kazakhstan and would win four seats in the 1994 legislative election. The Agrarian Party of Kazakhstan, led by Romin Madinov, was founded in 1999, which favored the privatization of agricultural land, developments towards rural infrastructure, as well as changes in the tax system in agrarian economy. The party would go on to win three Mäjilis seats in the 1999 legislative election and eventually unite with the Civic Party of Kazakhstan to form the pro-government Agrarian-Industrial Union of Workers (AIST) bloc that would be chaired by Madinov for the 2004 legislative election, with the AIST bloc winning 11 seats in the Mäjilis. From there, the bloc remained short-lived as it would merge with the ruling Nur Otan party in 2006.

Several other parties in Kazakhstan over the years have embraced agrarian policies in their programs in an effort to appeal towards a large rural Kazakh demographic base, which included Amanat, ADAL, and Respublica.

Since late 2000s, the Auyl party remains the largest and most influential agrarian-oriented party in Kazakhstan, as its presidential candidate Jiguli Dairabaev had become the second-place frontrunner in the 2022 presidential election after sweeping 3.4% of the vote. In the 2023 legislative election, the Auyl party for the first time was represented the parliament after winning nine seats in the lower chamber Mäjilis. The party raises rural issues in regard to decaying villages, rural development and the agro-industrial complex, the issues of social security of the rural population, and has consistently opposed the ongoing rural flight in Kazakhstan.

==== Latvia ====
In Latvia, the Union of Greens and Farmers is supportive of traditional small farms and perceives them as more environmentally friendly than large-scale farming: Nature is threatened by development, while small farms are threatened by large industrial-scale farms.

==== Lithuania ====
In Lithuania, the government led by the Lithuanian Farmers and Greens Union was in power between 2016 and 2020.

==== Nordic countries ====
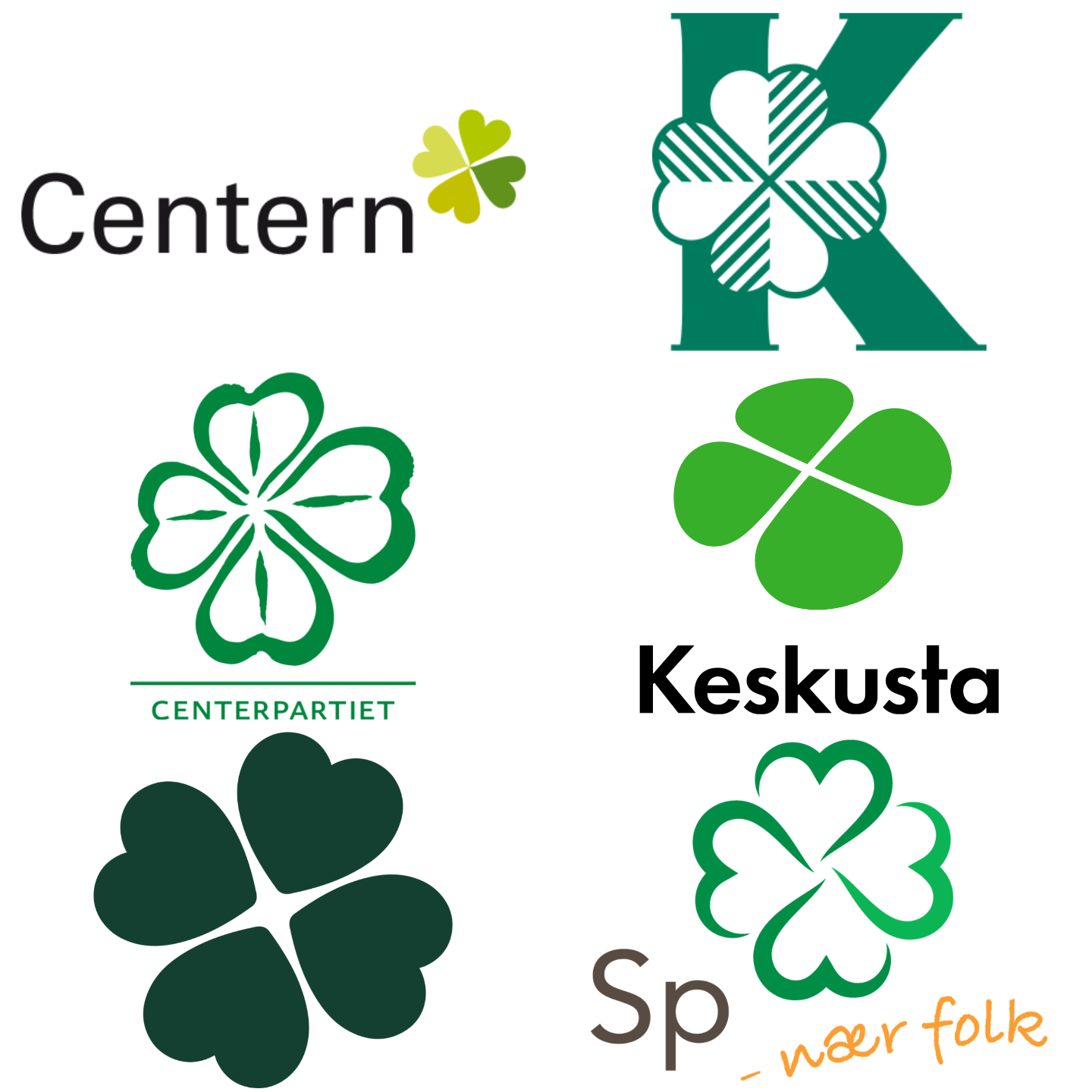
As well as sharing similar backgrounds and policies, Nordic agrarian parties share the use of a four leaf clover as their primary symbol.

The Nordic agrarian parties, also referred to as Scandinavian agrarian parties or agrarian liberal parties, are agrarian political parties that belong to a political tradition particular to the Nordic countries. Positioning themselves in the centre of the political spectrum, but fulfilling roles distinctive to Nordic countries, they remain hard to classify by conventional political ideology.

These parties are non-Socialist and typically combine a commitment to small businesses, rural issues and political decentralisation, and, at times, scepticism towards the European Union. The parties have divergent views on the free market and environmentalism. Internationally, they are most commonly aligned to the Alliance of Liberals and Democrats for Europe (ALDE) and the Liberal International.

Historically farmers' parties, a declining farmer population after the Second World War made them broaden their scope to other issues and sections of society. At this time three of them renamed themselves to Centre Party, with the Finnish Centre Party being the last to do so, in 1965. In the modern period, the main agrarian parties are the Centre Party in Sweden, Venstre in Denmark, Centre Party in Finland, Centre Party in Norway and Progressive Party in Iceland.

==== Poland ====
In Poland, the Polish People's Party (Polskie Stronnictwo Ludowe, PSL) traces its tradition to an agrarian party in Austro-Hungarian-controlled Galician Poland. After the fall of the communist regime, PSL's biggest success came in 1993 elections, where it won 132 out of 460 parliamentary seats. Since then, PSL's support has steadily declined, until 2019, when they formed Polish Coalition with an anti-establishment, direct democracy Kukiz'15 party, and managed to get 8.5% of popular vote. Moreover, PSL tends to get much better results in local elections. In 2014 elections they have managed to get 23.88% of votes.

The right-wing Law and Justice party has also become supportive of agrarian policies in recent years and polls show that most of their support comes from rural areas. AGROunia resembles the features of agrarianism.

==== Romania ====
In Romania, older party parties from Transylvania, Moldavia, and Wallachia merged to become the National Peasants' Party (PNȚ) in 1926. Iuliu Maniu (1873–1953) was a prime minister with an agrarian cabinet from 1928 to 1930 and briefly in 1932–1933, but the Great Depression made proposed reforms impossible. The communist administration dissolved the party in 1947 (along with other historical parties such as the National Liberal Party), but it reformed in 1989 after they fell from power.

The reformed party, which also incorporated elements of Christian democracy in its ideology, governed Romania as part of the Romanian Democratic Convention (CDR) between 1996 and 2000.

==== Serbia ====
In Serbia, Nikola Pašić (1845–1926) and his People's Radical Party dominated Serbian politics after 1903. The party also monopolized power in Yugoslavia from 1918 to 1929. During the dictatorship of the 1930s, the prime minister was from that party.

==== Ukraine ====
In Ukraine, the Radical Party of Oleh Lyashko has promised to purify the country of oligarchs "with a pitchfork". The party advocates a number of traditional left-wing positions (a progressive tax structure, a ban on agricultural land sale and eliminating the illegal land market, a tenfold increase in budget spending on health, setting up primary health centres in every village) and mixes them with strong nationalist sentiments.

==== United Kingdom ====
In land law the heyday of English, Irish (and thus Welsh) agrarianism was c. 1500 to 1603, led by the Tudor royal advisors, who sought to maintain a broad pool of agricultural commoners from which to draw military men, against the interests of larger landowners who sought enclosure (meaning complete private control of common land, over which by custom and common law lords of the manor always enjoyed minor rights). The heyday was eroded by hundreds of Acts of Parliament to expressly permit enclosure, chiefly from 1650 to the 1810s. Politicians standing strongly as reactionaries to this included the Levellers, those anti-industrialists (Luddites) going beyond opposing new weaving technology and, later, radicals such as William Cobbett.

A high level of net national or local self-sufficiency has a strong base in campaigns and movements. In the 19th century such empowered advocates included Peelites and most Conservatives. The 20th century saw the growth or start of influential non-governmental organisations, such as the National Farmers' Union of England and Wales, Campaign for Rural England, Friends of the Earth (EWNI) and of the England Wales, Scottish and Northern Irish political parties prefixed by and focussed on Green politics. The 21st century has seen decarbonisation already in electricity markets. Following protests and charitable lobbying local food has seen growing market share, sometimes backed by wording in public policy papers and manifestos. The UK has many sustainability-prioritising businesses, green charity campaigns, events and lobby groups ranging from espousing allotment gardens (hobby community farming) through to a clear policy of local food and/or self-sustainability models.

=== Oceania ===
==== Australia ====
Historian F.K. Crowley finds that:

Australian farmers and their spokesman have always considered that life on the land is inherently more virtuous, as well as more healthy, more important and more productive, than life in the towns and cities....The farmers complained that something was wrong with an electoral system which produced parliamentarians who spent money beautifying vampire-cities instead of developing the interior.

The National Party of Australia (formerly called the Country Party), from the 1920s to the 1970s, promulgated its version of agrarianism, which it called "countrymindedness". The goal was to enhance the status of the graziers (operators of big sheep stations) and small farmers and justified subsidies for them.

==== New Zealand ====
The New Zealand Liberal Party aggressively promoted agrarianism in its heyday (1891–1912). The landed gentry and aristocracy ruled Britain at this time. New Zealand never had an aristocracy but its wealthy landowners largely controlled politics before 1891. The Liberal Party set out to change that by a policy it called "populism." Richard Seddon had proclaimed the goal as early as 1884: "It is the rich and the poor; it is the wealthy and the landowners against the middle and labouring classes. That, Sir, shows the real political position of New Zealand." The Liberal strategy was to create a large class of small landowning farmers who supported Liberal ideals. The Liberal government also established the basis of the later welfare state such as old age pensions and developed a system for settling industrial disputes, which was accepted by both employers and trade unions. In 1893, it extended voting rights to women, making New Zealand the first country in the world to do so.

To obtain land for farmers, the Liberal government from 1891 to 1911 purchased 3,100,000 acres (1,300,000 ha) of Maori land. The government also purchased 1,300,000 acres (530,000 ha) from large estate holders for subdivision and closer settlement by small farmers. The Advances to Settlers Act (1894) provided low-interest mortgages, and the agriculture department disseminated information on the best farming methods. The Liberals proclaimed success in forging an egalitarian, anti-monopoly land policy. The policy built up support for the Liberal Party in rural North Island electorates. By 1903, the Liberals were so dominant that there was no longer an organized opposition in Parliament.

=== North America ===
The United States and Canada both saw a rise of Agrarian-oriented parties in the early twentieth century as economic troubles motivated farming communities to become politically active. It has been proposed that different responses to agrarian protest largely determined the course of power generated by these newly energized rural factions. According to Sociologist Barry Eidlin:

"In the United States, Democrats adopted a co-optive response to farmer and labor protest, incorporating these constituencies into the New Deal coalition. In Canada, both mainstream parties adopted a coercive response, leaving these constituencies politically excluded and available for an independent left coalition."

These reactions may have helped determine the outcome of agrarian power and political associations in the US and Canada.

==== United States ====
===== Kansas =====
Economic desperation experienced by farmers across the state of Kansas in the nineteenth century spurred the creation of The People's Party in 1890, and soon-after would gain control of the governor's office in 1892. This party, consisting of a mix of Democrats, Socialists, Populists, and Fusionists, would find itself buckling from internal conflict regarding the unlimited coinage of silver. The Populists permanently lost power in 1898.

===== Oklahoma =====
Oklahoma farmers considered their political activity during the early twentieth century due to the outbreak of war, depressed crop prices, and an inhibited sense of progression towards owning their own farms. Tenancy had been reportedly as high as 55% in Oklahoma by 1910. These pressures saw agrarian counties in Oklahoma supporting Socialist policies and politics, with the Socialist platform proposing a deeply agrarian-radical platform:

...the platform proposed a "Renters and Farmer's Program" which was strongly agrarian radical in its insistence upon various measures to put land into "The hands of the actual tillers of the soil." Although it did not propose to nationalize privately owned land, it did offer numerous plans to enlarge the state's public domain, from which land would be rented at prevailing share rents to tenants until they had paid rent equal to the land's value. The tenant and his children would have the right of occupancy and use, but the 'title' would remind in the 'commonwealth', an arrangement that might be aptly termed 'Socialist fee simple'. They proposed to exempt from taxation all farm dwellings, animals, and improvements up to the value of $1,000. The State Board of Agriculture would encourage 'co-operative societies' of farmers to make plans for the purchase of land, seed, tools, and for preparing and selling produce. In order to give farmers essential services at cost, the Socialists called for the creation of state banks and mortgage agencies, crop insurance, elevators, and warehouses.

This agrarian-backed Socialist party would win numerous offices, causing a panic within the local Democratic party. This agrarian-Socialist movement would be inhibited by voter suppression laws aimed at reducing the participation of voters of color, as well as national wartime policies intended to disrupt political elements considered subversive. This party would peak in power in 1914.

===== Wisconsin =====
Flag of the National Progressives of America which emerged from the agrarian Wisconsin Progressive Party in 1938

During the 1930s and 1940s many farmers supported the Wisconsin Progressive Party - National Progressives. Agrarianism during this time was often linked with progressive politics.

== Back-to-the-land movement ==
Agrarianism is similar to but not identical with the back-to-the-land movement. Agrarianism concentrates on the fundamental goods of the earth, on communities of more limited economic and political scale than in modern society, and on simple living, even when the shift involves questioning the "progressive" character of some recent social and economic developments. Thus, agrarianism is not industrial farming, with its specialization on products and industrial scale.

== See also ==
- Co-operative Commonwealth Federation
- Farmer–Labor Party
- Labour-Farmer Party
- Minnesota Farmer–Labor Party
- Progressive Party of Canada
- Social Credit Party of Canada
- United Farmers of Canada
