= 2021 Kazakh municipal elections =

- 25 July 2021 (general); 1 August – 12 December 2021 (by-elections)

730 out of 2,345 rural äkıms
- Turnout: 79.10% (general)
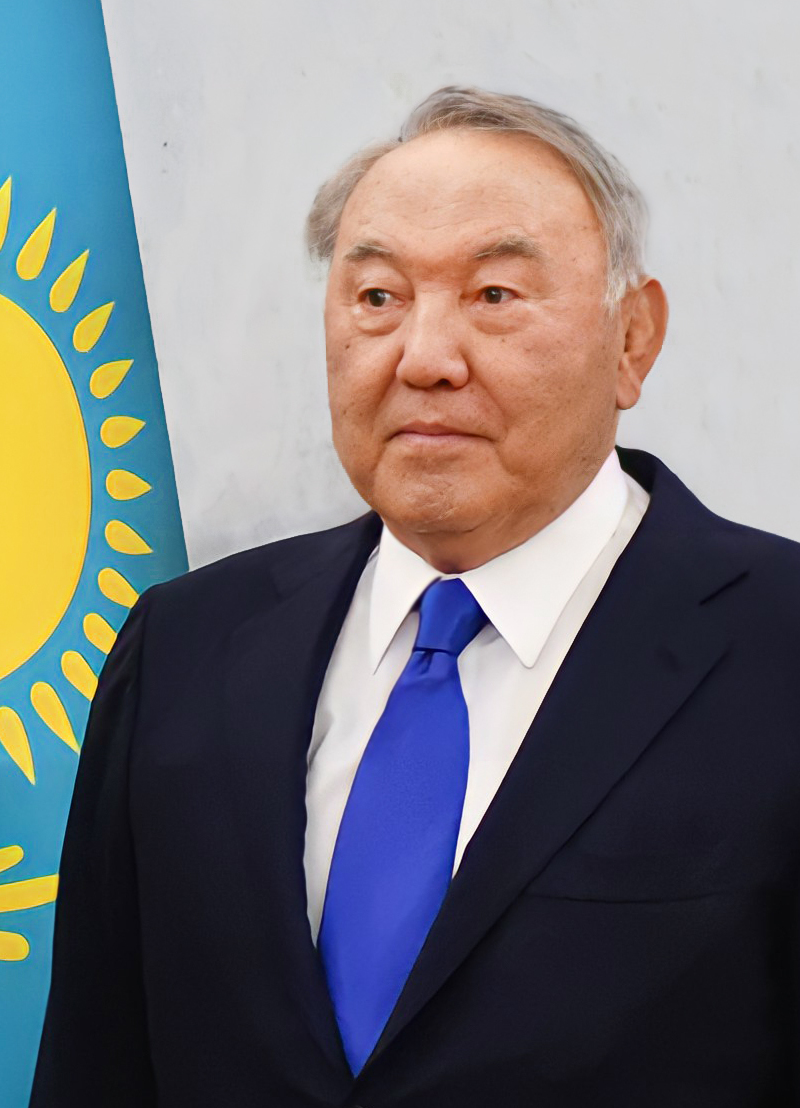

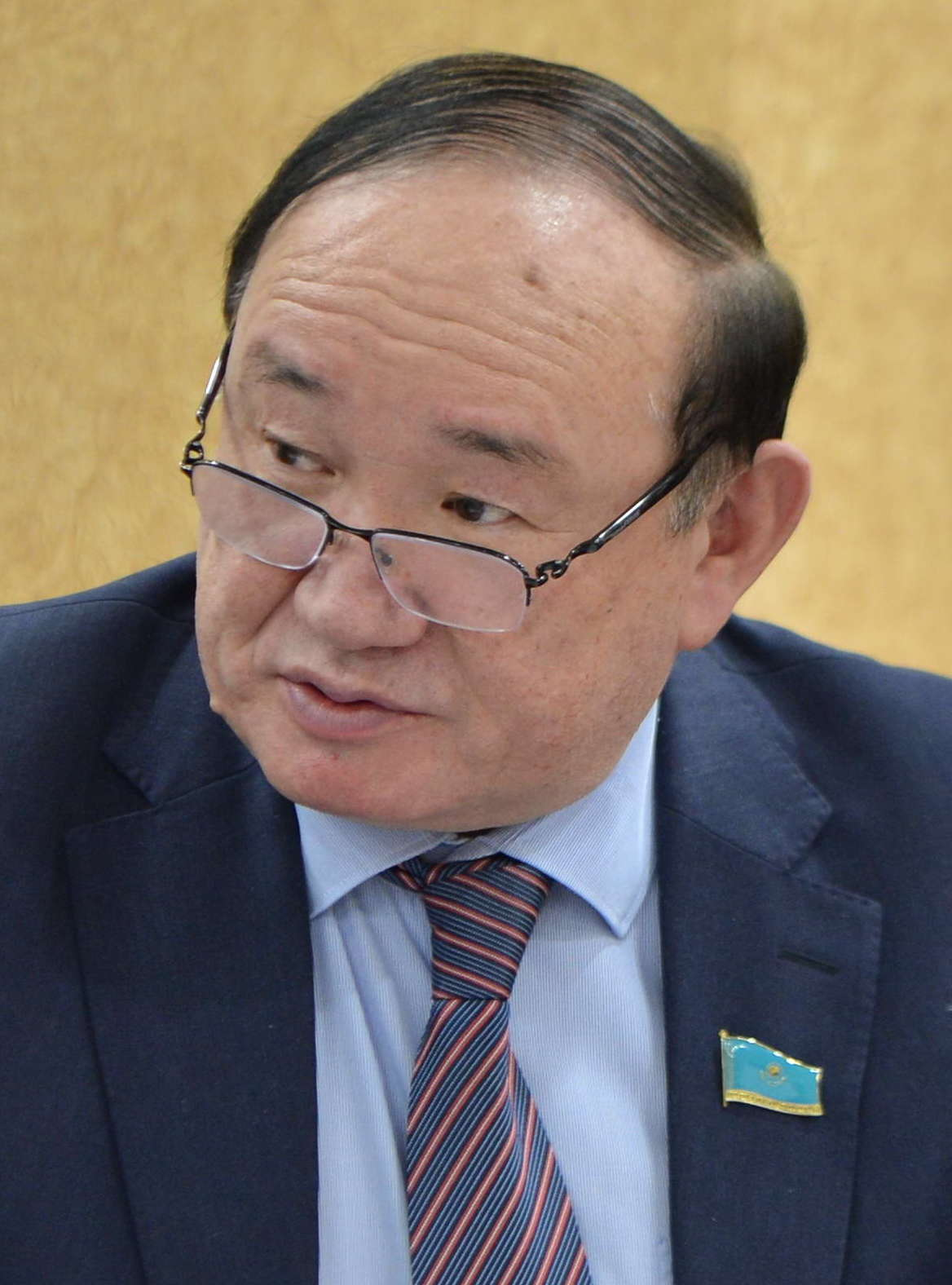

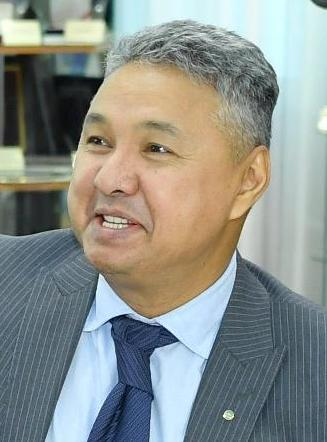

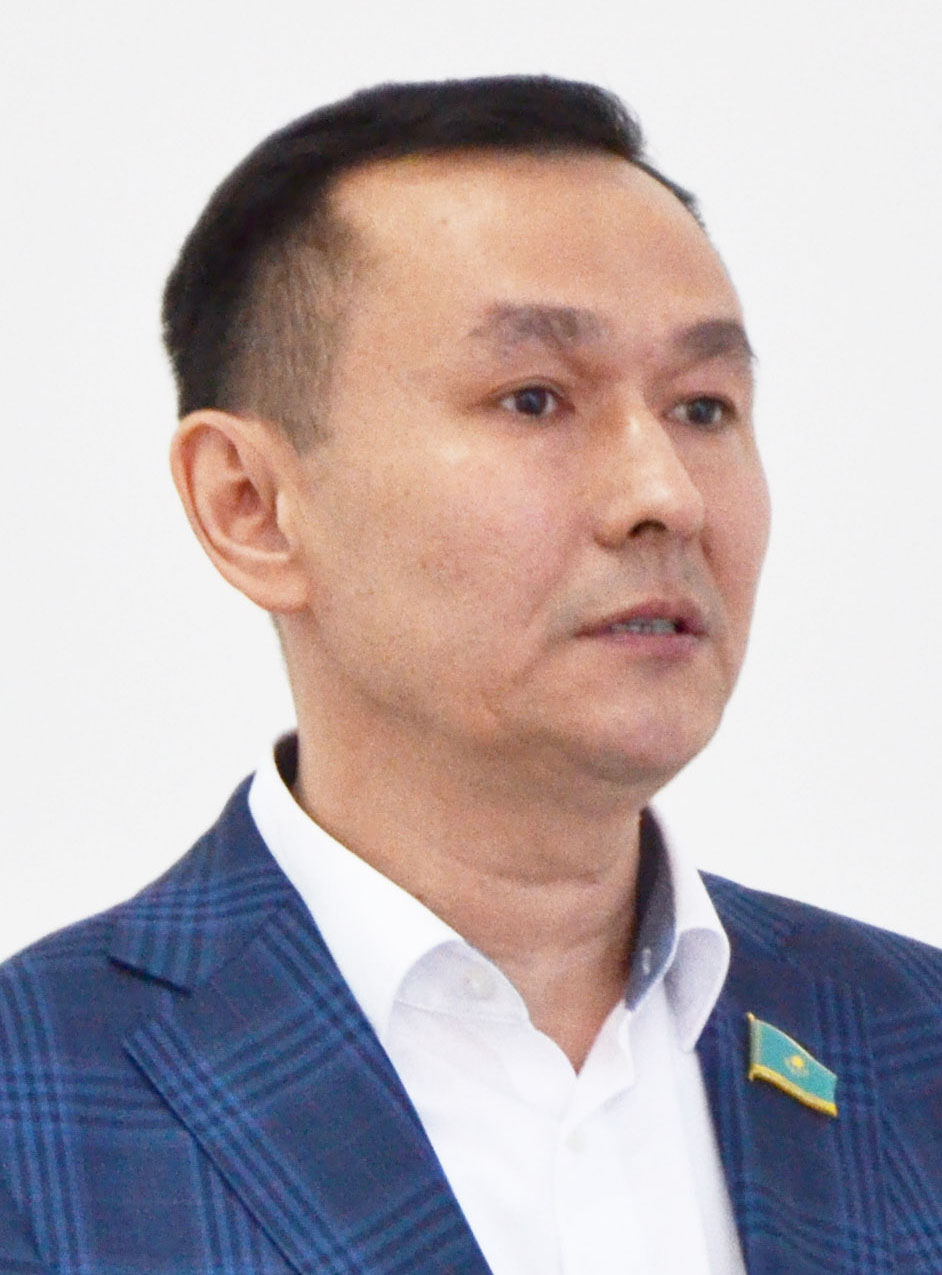

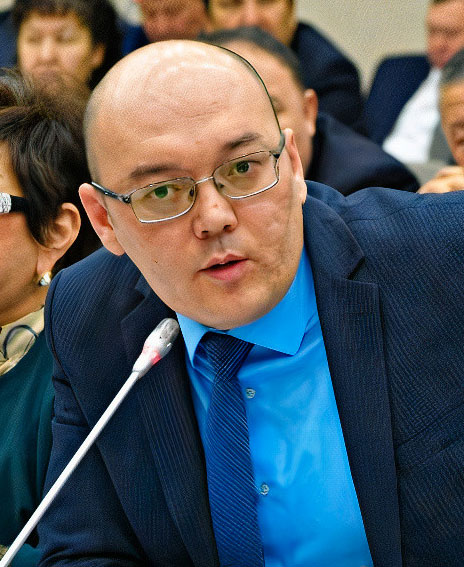
	Majority party	Minority party	Third party
			ADAL
Leader	Nursultan Nazarbayev	Äli Bektaev	Serik Sultangali
Party	Nur Otan	Auyl	Adal
Leader since	1 March 1999	26 August 2015	26 April 2013
Äkıms	627	33	15
Percentage	85.89%	4.52%	4.52%
	Fourth party	Fifth party	Sixth party
Leader	Azat Peruashev	Aiqyn Qongyrov	Ashat Raqymjanov
Party	Aq Jol	QHP	JSDP
Leader since	2 July 2011	11 November 2020	6 September 2019
Äkıms	11	10	1
Percentage	2.05%	1.51%	1.37%

Municipal elections were held in Kazakhstan where 730 äkıms (local heads) whose four-year terms expired were reelected for the first time directly by the population on 25 July 2021 following an introduction of new law by the Parliament, which allowed for direct elections for äkıms of cities with district importance, villages, and the townships of rural districts. From there, the ruling Nur Otan party won majority of 627 municipal races with most of its candidates being incumbents who occupied the äkım positions prior, followed by the Auyl People's Democratic Patriotic Party (33 äkıms), Adal (15 äkıms), Ak Zhol Democratic Party (11 äkıms), People's Party of Kazakhstan (10 äkıms), and the Nationwide Social Democratic Party where it secured local race victory in West Kazakhstan Region.

By-elections of äkıms in remaining vacant districts continued taking place later in the second half of the year from 1 August until 12 December 2021.

== Background ==
The concept of direct elections for the rural äkıms (local heads) in Kazakhstan traces as far back to 1999–when for the first time the äkım of the Karasay District in Almaty Region was directly elected in former president Nursultan Nazarbayev's birthplace, Chemolgan, by village residents on an experimental basis. A few years later in October 2001, direct elections for äkıms were held in 28 different rural villages. Such electoral experiments continued to take place until 2013, when a law "On amending and amending some legislation of the Republic of Kazakhstan on the development of local government" was adopted, which allowed for the mäslihats (local assemblies) to indirectly vote for village and township äkıms, as well as those in cities of district importance, for a four-year term, who would be proposed by the district äkım himself.

In 2018, the idea of directly electing äkıms rearose after Justice Minister Marat Beketaev presented one of the proposed bills to the Mazhilis in amending the Constitution, which would allow for political parties to nominate candidates for the rural äkım post, who would, in turn, be elected by the residents. However, the Senate on 14 June 2018 rejected the Mazhilis' proposal for the direct-elections of äkıms, thus putting the bill aside.

On 1 September 2020, during the address to the nation, President Kassym-Jomart Tokayev announced the elections of rural municipal äkıms would take place in 2021 and on 14 September, he signed a presidential decree on measures which called for the rural äkıms to be directly elected by the population. On 19 October 2020, the Ministry of National Economy drafted bill on the direct-elections of villages, towns and rural districts äkıms. In April 2021, the proposed bills were presented to the Mazhilis which would allow for political and self-nominated candidates to run in the rural äkım elections. The Mazhilis on 5 May 2021 approved the law to which has received remarks amongst the MP's such as Aidos Sarym, who called it "a very important historical step." On 20 May, the Senate voted in favour of the bill with Tokayev signing it into law on 25 May, with a choice of "Against all" in the electoral ballots were set to be included as well.

Tokayev's assistant for political affairs Erlan Karin on 25 June 2021 announced in his social media that the rural äkım elections would be held on 25 July, calling it a "very serious event, which marks a completely new stage of political modernisation."

== Electoral system ==
Villages, towns, rural districts and cities of district importance äkıms (local heads) are directly elected by the residents for a four-year term. An äkım must be a Kazakhstani citizen of at least 25 years of age with a higher education degree and an experience in the civil service for at least one year and at least two years in the leadership positions of non-government organisations (NGOs).

=== Procedure ===
At the meeting of the Council on Interaction with the Mäslihats in the Senate, National Economy Minister Aset Irgaliev stated that the rural äkım elections would be financed by the local budget and that 836 rural äkıms would be up for contested seat.

Elections are announced 40 days in advance and conducted 10 days before the expiration of the term of office of the incumbent äkım with the electoral campaign being held for 30 days.

== Parties ==
Following the announcement of the election date, nominations of candidates began on 26 June 2021 and ended on 9 July 2021. Candidates for äkım posts of cities of district significance, villages, towns, and rural districts are either nominated by themselves (with a collection of signatures in support of a candidate in the amount of at least 1% of voters living in the corresponding city or rural district), political parties from its members, or the district äkım (if only two candidates by the end of the nomination period).

As of 7 July 2021, a total of 2322 candidates were nominated, with most being self-nominees (independents), to which amounted to 1455 people, and 867 were nominated from political parties as follows:

Party		Ideology	Leader	No. of candidates
NO	Nur Otan	Big tent	Nursultan Nazarbayev	588 / 867 (68%)
AUYL	Auyl People's Democratic Patriotic Party	Agrarianism	Äli Bektaev	100 / 867 (12%)
QHP	People's Party of Kazakhstan	Socialism	Aiqyn Qongyrov	70 / 867 (8%)
ADAL	Adal	Social capitalism	Serik Sultangali	56 / 867 (6%)
AJ	Ak Zhol Democratic Party	Liberalism	Azat Peruashev	53 / 867 (6%)

=== Nur Otan ===
According to the party's first deputy chairman Bauyrjan Baibek, more than 35% of the candidates from the Nur Otan are new faces, including representatives of education, entrepreneurs, farmers, and from recent closed primaries, chairmen of primary party organizations. The average age of the candidates is 46 years. 11% of applicants are women, 14% are representatives of young people under 35 years old and that the main task for the party would be in creating systemic conditions for the development of villages and solving problems. He also expressed that the Nur Otan would aim at winning 80% of all local races.

The Nur Otan had a significant administrative and financial resources with nominating the most candidates on basis of political affiliation in the election. However, because of almost all incumbent rural äkıms being the members of the party, the Nur Otan positioned itself in a more difficult position of facing self-nominated candidates as well as facing problems within villages which occurred under the Nur Otan-affiliated äkıms.

=== Auyl ===
On 22 June 2021, the 19th Auyl Extraordinary Congress was held in Nur-Sultan where the party announced that it would participate in the elections with Chairman Äli Bektaev proclaiming it as a "unique and historic event" stressing that the party "should not stay away from the political life of the country." Head of the Auyl Branch in Aqtobe Region Orazbek Dalmagambetov expressed the need for the party to compete in rural äkım races, claiming that the Auyl candidates have "sufficient competence and respect among the villagers." The party at the congress expressed its confidence that the elections would encourage further increased participation of local communities in the management of the settlement, as well as the responsibility and openness of mayors to the population that elects it.

In spite of the Auyl's advantage in attracting support due to its name and political platforms that generally favour rural interests, the party was seen to not have noticeable activity compared to others and that its best chance would be in making a campaign breakthrough in last stages of the election.

=== Aq Jol ===
The Aq Jol Democratic Party (AJ) announced its intent to participate in the rural äkım elections at the party's 17th Extraordinary Congress.

=== People's Party ===
People's Party of Kazakhstan (QHP) chairman Aiqyn Qongyrov on 4 June 2021 at the 18th Extraordinary Congress announced that the QHP will contest its nominees for the rural äkım posts, hoping that the candidates would pass the "strictest–an electoral exam for their professional and human qualities," claiming that it would "improve the quality of governance and become a fairly effective anti-corruption measure." On 28 June, at the party's press conference, Qongyrov criticised the government for its failure in conducting the elections, stressing the issues in no explanatory work being carried out with the population, difficult access to information, short amount of campaign time. He also opposed the incumbent äkıms running for reelection, citing that the reelection contestants with their administrative resource would take the advantage in committing political sabotages and possibly get rid of the direct elections. In spite Qongyrov's backlash, he stated that the QHP would put forward its candidates and that it would actively support self-nominees as well.

The QHP's condition was described to "shaky" following the party's rebranding in November 2020 which has believed to caused a split within the QHP faction as well as a possible loss of some of its support base. However, confidence towards the party remained as it had performed usually better in the 2021 legislative elections and that it could still garner support well from the electorate living in the rural areas as many were described to feeling nostalgic towards the Soviet Union.

=== Adal ===
At the 8th Adal Extraordinary Congress held on 2 June 2021, party chairman Serik Sultangali expressed interest in nominating candidates for rural äkıms. According to Adal secretary Nurlybek Muqanov, more than 270 candidates were selected to be trained in the activities and functionality of äkıms. Sultangali called for increased work with the rural residents and agricultural agents, noting that the further development of the village and its residents depends on the party delegates.

On 3 July 2021, the party announced that 267 candidates were nominated for the rural äkım posts in the aftermath of regional conferences where each candidates' programmes were discussed where were in identifying infrastructure problems and ways to solve them, create additional jobs, start blue business projects, and increase in local budget as well as social blocks.

=== Nationwide Social Democratic Party ===
Due to the Nationwide Social Democratic Party (JSDP) previously boycotting the January 2021 general elections, some doubts were raised in whether JSDP would field its candidates for the rural äkım posts or refuse to contest the race once more. Not ruling out the party's participation, JSDP chairman Ashat Raqymjanov at the meeting of Republican Public Council for the Development of Civil Society and Public Administration held under Nur Otan proposed to conduct an online livestream on election day in order to ensure transparency, openness and legitimacy of the electoral conduct. The JSDP was viewed to be an inactive party, with its activists reportedly joining other political movements.

== Candidates by region ==
Region	No. of local races	Nur Otan	Auyl	QHP	Aq Jol	Adal	JSDP	Independents	Total:
Almaty	71	51	6	9	—	11	2	156	235
Aqmola	95	76	2	7	5	2	1	210	303
Aqtöbe	35	28	16	5	9	5	2	42	107
Atyrau	31	15	5	3	2	2	1	32	60
East Kazakhstan	77	61	18	1	1	3	1	150	235
Jambyl	38	31	16	9	16	2	—	42	116
Karaganda	75	59	3	14	3	3	—	186	268
Kostanay	59	52	2	—	3	2	—	88	147
Kyzylorda	40	32	7	4	3	2	—	82	130
Mangystau	10	8	—	3	2	3	1	22	39
North Kazakhstan	71	57	3	4	2	2	—	150	218
Pavlodar	44	35	2	5	5	3	2	90	142
Turkistan	60	48	19	3	6	5	3	130	214
West Kazakhstan	31	25	5	3	1	5	1	53	93
Total:	743	578	104	70	58	50	14	1,433	2,307

== Campaign ==
=== Nur Otan ===
At the Nur Otan Republican Public Council for Regional Development meeting, a discussion was held on the implementation of the party's campaign promise prior the 2021 legislative elections which called to for modernisation of 3.5 thousand villages by 2025 in terms of improving the standard of living in rural areas. It was revealed that the Auyl-El Besig project planned to allocate 105 billion tenge in development of more than 480 villages, which are inhabited by 1.3 million people, in which according to Deputy Minister of National Economy Älişer Abdyqadyrov, it would allow to implement more than 1,000 projects for the development of transport, social and housing and communal infrastructure.

Ereymentau äkım candidate Sapar Barlybaev from the Nur Otan party in an Khabar Agency interview called on the electorate to vote for him, saying that it would change his own life for the better. As a result, Barlybaev's statements went viral on social media in which Barlybaev admitted that he felt "little unpleasant", stating that he took his own words as "humour" without expecting to gain huge attention on the internet. Barlybaev also accused his rival self-nominated candidate Abylaihan Syrymbetov of committing a campaign violation, which resulted in a court decision removing Syrymbetov from the race. He objected to the ruling, announcing that he would try to appeal it.

=== People's Party ===
On 4 June 2021, the People's Party of Kazakhstan (QHP) announced that a special online resource would be opened, which would show information towards candidates from the QHP that would contest for the rural äkım posts.

On 18 June, the party launched a project named "Red Bus", in which the QHP-themed campaign bus would conduct visits across Kazakhstan's regions in order to identify, designate and pressure local authorities to eliminate the problems in remote parts of the country. In result of the working visits to Almaty, East Kazakhstan, Turkistan regions, the QHP representatives expressed their intent to send an appeal to President Kassym-Jomart Tokayev, pressuring him to take a stronger stance on the shortage of high-quality drinking water issue. On 19 July 2021, it was reported that the party had sent a letter to Tokayev, which urged him to solve the problem urgently as well as to examine the proper allocation funds through state programmes to provide the residents with clean drinking water. According to QHP chairman Aiqyn Qongyrov, some people living within the areas were threatened with a complete water utility cut by local officials if they had reported their complaints to the party.

=== Adal ===
Throughout the villages, the Adal held surveys with residents in order to identify longstanding problems in settlements of which haven't been solved. In result, the party stressed five problems, which were: lack of clean drinking water, bad quality of roads, lack of jobs, poor Internet quality and mobile communication, and a lack of grazing land due to 98% of it being in rent. The Adal called on the government to pay more attention to the problems of rural areas as well as an audit to all programmes and in response to the dire situation, the party announced drafting of its programme named "Ауыл – маңызды экономикалық бірлік" ("Village – an important economic unity") which would aim at increasing income of residents in specified villages. According to party's secretary Eldar Jumagaziev in an interview to Forbes, the programme would develop policies on the basis with the participation of village residents by conducting economic census and from there, he proposed the Adal Project Office which would assist the äkım in solving local issues.

=== Others ===
At the Kökterek Rural District in Turkistan Region, which encompasses the villages of Keñestöbe, Bırlık, and Yntymaq, Äbdırazaq Mäulenau whom was forced to quit his job after facing growing support from the district's activists and aqsaqals, campaigned for high quality infrastructure such as water supply, electricity, gas supply, and roads and pledged to attract investors and entrepreneurs to the villages. Maulenau's challenger, Nurdäulet Dihanbaev, whom was nominee for the Nur Otan, promised to solve the issue for hay harvesting and pay great attention cleanliness of streets in the settlements of the district.

== Controversies ==
=== Äşımbetov's dismissal ===
Nūrjan Äşımbetov, a Nur Otan party member who previously served as an äkım of Aksu, was dismissed from his post on 21 May 2021 after just four months due to numerous complaints that he allegedly created unbearable conditions for city employees. As a result the Ethics Council called for termination of his powers. During his tenure, Äşımbetov reported numerous problems within the administration regarding code violations as well as embezzlement of funds by city enterprises. Despite being forced to step down by the Pavlodar Regional äkım Äbilqayır Sqaqov, Äşımbetov received applause on social media for his work to make city services operate properly and asking state agencies to respond to active complaints by the residents.

At the press conference the following day, on 22 May 2021, Äşımbetov announced that he would challenge his dismissal by running as an independent in an election in his native village of Kenjeköl where he and his father were well known. However, the chairman of the Pavlodar Regional Election Commission, Gülnar Amanjolova, said it would be unlikely that Äşımbetov could successfully become a candidate, adding that any articles from the contestant discrediting the civil service would be barred from running, although noting that the question regarding Äşımbetov's case would be up to an authorised state body.

=== Removal of candidates ===
Abylaihan Bijanov, a resident of Orazaq, was barred from running despite being promptly registered as a candidate, due to an alleged date error in his tax returns. In response, he filed a lawsuit against the Tselinograd District Election Commission on 17 July 2021. The case was dismissed the following day by a district judge. As a result, discontent broke out amongst Bijanov's supporters, who gathered at the district courthouse, demanding to file a complaint and threatening to boycott the polls if Bijanov would not appear on the ballot. Human rights activist and lawyer Marjan Aspandiarova commented on the situation, describing it as "negligence of state bodies and the election commission."

Muqtar Omarov complained about being disqualified from running for an election due to discrepancies in the documents in which according to him, was due to filling out a tax return in the month of July instead of June in spite of having his declarations verified before the registration process of äkım candidates ended.

The Qyzylorda TV correspondent Asqar Tajiev expressed his interest for candidacy in the rural äkım post in Mailytoğai. However, after being registered, Tajiev announced on his Facebook page that he was prevented from running due to "discrepancies in his tax returns" and that document verification was finalised after the candidate registration deadline. Tajiev stressed that the mistake would've been corrected quickly had he been notified earlier.

== Observation ==
On 9 July 2021, the Center for Non-Partisan Observation chairman Tölegen Kunadilov announced that the organisation would take part in the observing the local elections, stressing the need to observe, record violations, and promote fair elections, noting that it would mark completely new stage of political modernisation and that team with extensive experience in the field of electoral observation was formed.

Under health guidelines amid the COVID-19 pandemic, it was reported that poll monitors, election commissions, proxies and media reporters would be required to have a PCR-test done or a vaccine passport against the virus shown before entering the polling precincts. Anyone with certain medical conditions could be exempted from vaccination and under the resolution of the Kazakhstan's Chief State Sanitary Doctor. All participants in the electoral process would be provided with personal protective equipment and would be required to maintain social distancing. A special isolated room would be in place in case of a person reporting feeling symptoms of COVID-19.

According to the co-founder of Erdındık Qanaty, Roman Reimer, only loyal observers towards the election commissions and candidates would be allowed at the polling stations, whom in turn would likely refute themselves from reporting possible violations, pointing out the poll observers are barred from conducting photo and video recording, as well as live streams. Independent observers were refused access to monitor the electoral precincts.

The Youth Informational Service of Kazakhstan (MISK) on 25 July 2021 reported that it had sent monitors to several villages in the Aqmola, Almaty, East Kazakhstan, North Kazakhstan, and Turkistan regions where it assessed that the areas had a low electoral turnout rate.

== Conduct ==
Polls opened at 18:00 local time on 25 July 2021 in all 14 regions of Kazakhstan at a total amounted to 1,847 sites. According to the Territorial Election Commissions (ASKs), a total of 1,209,817 voters were eligible to take part in the election. All polling sites would remain open until 20:00 local time, when the vote cast is set to be concluded.

=== Violations ===
Representatives from the Erdındık Qanaty had reported visiting polls in the Aqmola, East Kazakhstan, Karaganda, Pavlodar, and North Kazakhstan regions where they had witnessed campaign advertisements from the ruling Nur Otan party candidates, no special access for voters with disabilities, and pre-marked ballots as well. At one of the polling stations, one resident reported that a woman whom was admitted as an observer was allegedly a school employee that worked as a technician.

The Youth Informational Service of Kazakhstan (MISK) complained about its observers being pursued by unknown figures in the Turkistan Region and that in Almaty Region, the election commission chairman had sent personal documents of several observers to the National Security Committee.

Journalist Amangeldi Batyrbekov at Polling Precinct No. 659 in the Kurkeles village reported that he had witnessed a member of the election commission Saliha Tolymbekova handing an unnamed voter two ballots, in which the voter admitted that he "voted for his mother for the second time."

== Results ==
Under the Kazakh electoral law, results are announced within three days after the polls close and for the period of seven days, registration of newly elected äkıms takes place by the Territorial Election Commissions (ASKs).

Just days after the elections took place, the ASKs reported the final results throughout the regions which showed the ruling Nur Otan party candidates winning majority of races with 627 rural äkım posts being secured by persons whom were nominated by the party, including 65 Independents. An estimated 2/3's of elected rural äkıms were incumbents while only 1/3 were new figures.

At around 10:00, the first reports of hundreds of people showing at the polls were in Almaty, North Kazakhstan and Kostanay regions and were presented with memorable gifts.

At 12:00, the highest turnout was observed in Jambyl Region, where over 30% of estimated voters had cast their ballots. The Jambyl Region continued taking the lead in terms of the electoral turnout and by 16:00, it had reached 78.7%.

Party	Votes	%	Äkıms
Nur Otan			627
Auyl People's Democratic Patriotic Party			33
Adal			15
Aq Jol			11
People's Party of Kazakhstan			10
Nationwide Social Democratic Party			1
Independents			33
Total			730
Total votes	956,984	–	
Registered voters/turnout	1,209,817	79.10	
Source: Caravan.kz Newsroom.kz

=== Aqmola Region ===
Aqmola Region

Number of elected äkims by district
Nur Otan (74)
Independent (14)
People's Party (3)
Aq Jol (2)
Auyl (1)
Adal (1)

Party	Votes	%	Äkıms
Nur Otan	46,109	63.37	74
People's Party of Kazakhstan	1,809	2.49	3
Aq Jol	976	1.34	2
Auyl People's Democratic Patriotic Party	544	0.75	1
Adal	278	0.38	1
Independents	18,163	24.96	14
Against all	4,880	6.71	–
Total	72,759	100.00	95
Valid votes	72,759	95.95	
Invalid/blank votes	3,074	4.05	
Total votes	75,833	100.00	
Registered voters/turnout	100,111	75.75	
Source: AOSK

=== Aqtobe Region ===
Party	Votes	%	Äkıms
Nur Otan			28
Auyl People's Democratic Patriotic Party			2
Aq Jol			1
Adal			1
People's Party of Kazakhstan			1
Independents			2
Total			35
Total votes	25,308	–	
Registered voters/turnout	32,017	79.05	
Source: AOSK

=== Almaty Region ===
Party	Votes	%	Äkıms
Nur Otan			57
Auyl People's Democratic Patriotic Party			3
Independents			11
Total			71
Total votes	149,888	–	
Registered voters/turnout	221,952	67.53	

=== Atyrau Region ===
Party	Votes	%	Äkıms
Nur Otan			15
Adal			1
Independents			2
Total			18
Total votes	32,981	–	
Registered voters/turnout	44,305	74.44	
Source: AOSK

=== East Kazakhstan Region ===
Party	Votes	%	Äkıms
Nur Otan			60
Auyl People's Democratic Patriotic Party			11
Adal			2
Aq Jol			1
People's Party of Kazakhstan			1
Independents			2
Total			77
Total votes	101,184	–	
Registered voters/turnout	111,328	90.89	
Source: ŞOSK

=== Jambyl Region ===
Party	Votes	%	Äkıms
Nur Otan			31
Auyl People's Democratic Patriotic Party			1
Adal			1
Aq Jol			1
People's Party of Kazakhstan			1
Independents			3
Total			38
Total votes	94,642	–	
Registered voters/turnout	104,391	90.66	
Source: JOSK

=== West Kazakhstan Region ===
Party	Votes	%	Äkıms
Nur Otan			22
Auyl People's Democratic Patriotic Party			1
Nationwide Social Democratic Party			1
Independents			7
Total			31
Total votes	31,478	–	
Registered voters/turnout	38,724	81.29	
Source: BOSK Jaiyq Press

=== Karaganda Region ===
Party	Votes	%	Äkıms
Nur Otan			56
Auyl People's Democratic Patriotic Party			3
Aq Jol			1
Adal			1
Independents			14
Total			75
Total votes	61,846	–	
Registered voters/turnout	81,540	75.85	
Source: QOSK

=== Kostanay Region ===
Party	Votes	%	Äkıms
Nur Otan			52
Auyl People's Democratic Patriotic Party			2
Aq Jol			2
Adal			2
Independents			7
Total			65
Total votes	39,510	–	
Registered voters/turnout	46,799	84.42	
Source: QOSK

=== Kyzylorda Region ===
Party	Votes	%	Äkıms
Nur Otan			30
Auyl People's Democratic Patriotic Party			2
Adal			2
People's Party of Kazakhstan			1
Independents			5
Total			40
Total votes	30,149	–	
Registered voters/turnout	36,071	83.58	
Source: QOSK

=== Mangystau Region ===
Party	Votes	%	Äkıms
Nur Otan			8
Adal			1
Independents			1
Total			10
Total votes	11,650	–	
Registered voters/turnout	14,144	82.37	
Source: MOSK

=== Pavlodar Region ===
Party	Votes	%	Äkıms
Nur Otan			34
Auyl People's Democratic Patriotic Party			2
Aq Jol			1
Adal			1
Independents			6
Total			44
Total votes	40,628	–	
Registered voters/turnout	52,819	76.92	
Source: POSK

=== North Kazakhstan Region ===
Party	Votes	%	Äkıms
Nur Otan			55
Auyl People's Democratic Patriotic Party			3
People's Party of Kazakhstan			3
Aq Jol			2
Adal			1
Independents			7
Total			71
Total votes	52,660	–	
Registered voters/turnout	60,471	87.08	
Source: NOSK

=== Türkistan Region ===
Party	Votes	%	Äkıms
Nur Otan			41
Auyl People's Democratic Patriotic Party			1
Adal			1
Independents			17
Total			60
Total votes	209,227	–	
Registered voters/turnout	265,146	78.91	
Source: TOSK TOSK

== By-elections ==
=== 1 August ===
The rural district äkım elections within the Shieli District and Aral District in Kyzylorda Region were initially set to be held on the same day on 25 July as general municipal races were but were rescheduled for 1 August 2021. A total of nine candidates were nominated for the races in the districts which only seven of them ended being registered.

2021 Aqqum Rural District äkım election
Party	Candidate	Votes	%
Nur Otan	Nūrbek Jandäuletov	731	78.77%
Independent	Myrzagul Rsalieva	153	16.49%
Independent	Qaiyrjan Nūrhojaev	6	0.65%
Independent	Zauregul Mahajanova	3	0.32%
Against all		0	0.00%
Invalid/blank votes		35	3.77%
Total		928	100.00
Registered voters/turnout		1,283	72.33
Source: AASK AASK Syrboyi.kz

2021 Talaptan Rural District äkım election
Party	Candidate	Votes	%
Nur Otan	Amankeldı Ömırälı	1,816	94.44%
Independent	Bekbolat Düisenov	94	4.89%
Against all		0	0.00%
Invalid/blank votes		13	0.68%
Total		1,923	100.00
Registered voters/turnout		2,244	85.70
Source: ŞASK AASK Syrboyi.kz

=== 8 August ===
On 9 July 2021, the Jambyl District Election Commission (JASK) scheduled for äkım elections to be held in Ülken Rural District. A total of three candidates were registered on 28 July with two being independents.

2021 Ülken Rural District äkım election
Party	Candidate	Votes	%
Nur Otan	Kenjemūrat Qasenov	732	85.12%
Independent	Aidyn Berdyqūlov	82	9.53%
Independent	Anuar Qalqabaev	46	5.35%
Against all		0	0.00%
Invalid/blank votes		0	3.77%
Total		860	100.00
Registered voters/turnout		1,200	71.67
Source: JASK Syrboyi.kz

=== 22 August ===
On 23 July 2021, the Şalqar District Election Commission (ŞASK) set the date for äkım elections to take place in Berşügır Rural District within the Aqtöbe Region. From 24 July, nominations of candidates were held where a total of four candidates were registered on 11 August.

Party	Candidate	Votes	%
Nur Otan	Aitqali Jūbanazar	473	61.59%
People's Party	Mereke Bisenbin	234	30.47%
Independent	Äset Tomanbaev	6	0.78%
Independent	Medet Tūrğanbaev	3	0.39%
Against all		4	0.52%
Invalid/blank votes		48	6.25%
Total		768	100.00
Registered voters/turnout		1,175	65.36
Source: ŞASK ŞASK ŞASK
