= 1999 Kazakh legislative election =

- 10 October 1999 (first round); 24 October 1999 (second round)

All 77 seats in the Mäjilis 39 seats needed for a majority
- Registered: 8,411,757
- Turnout: 62.5% (▼17.3pp)
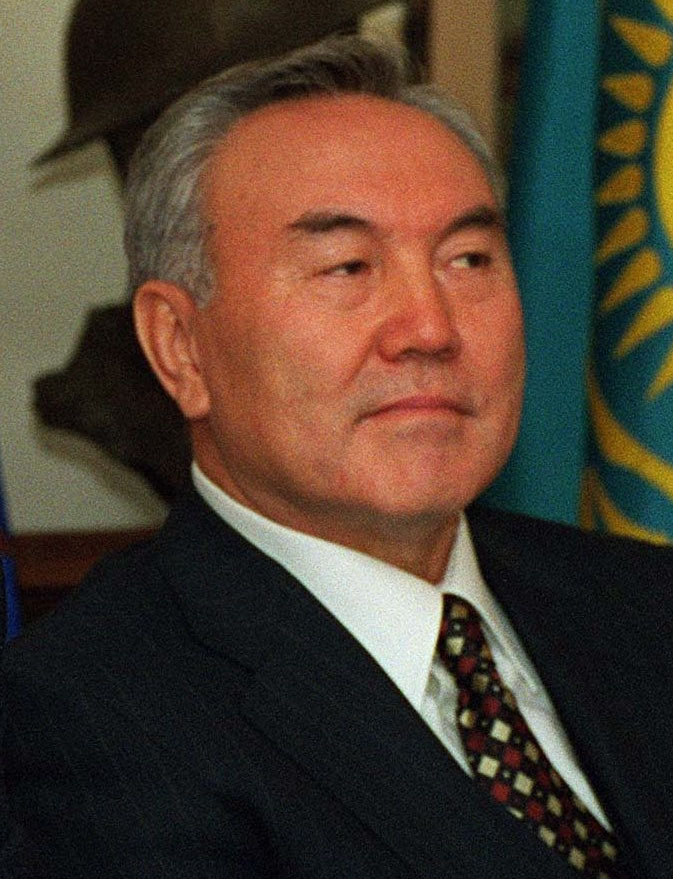

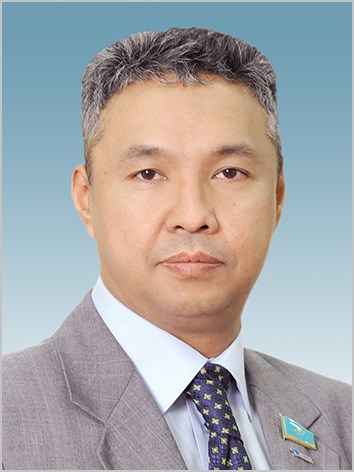

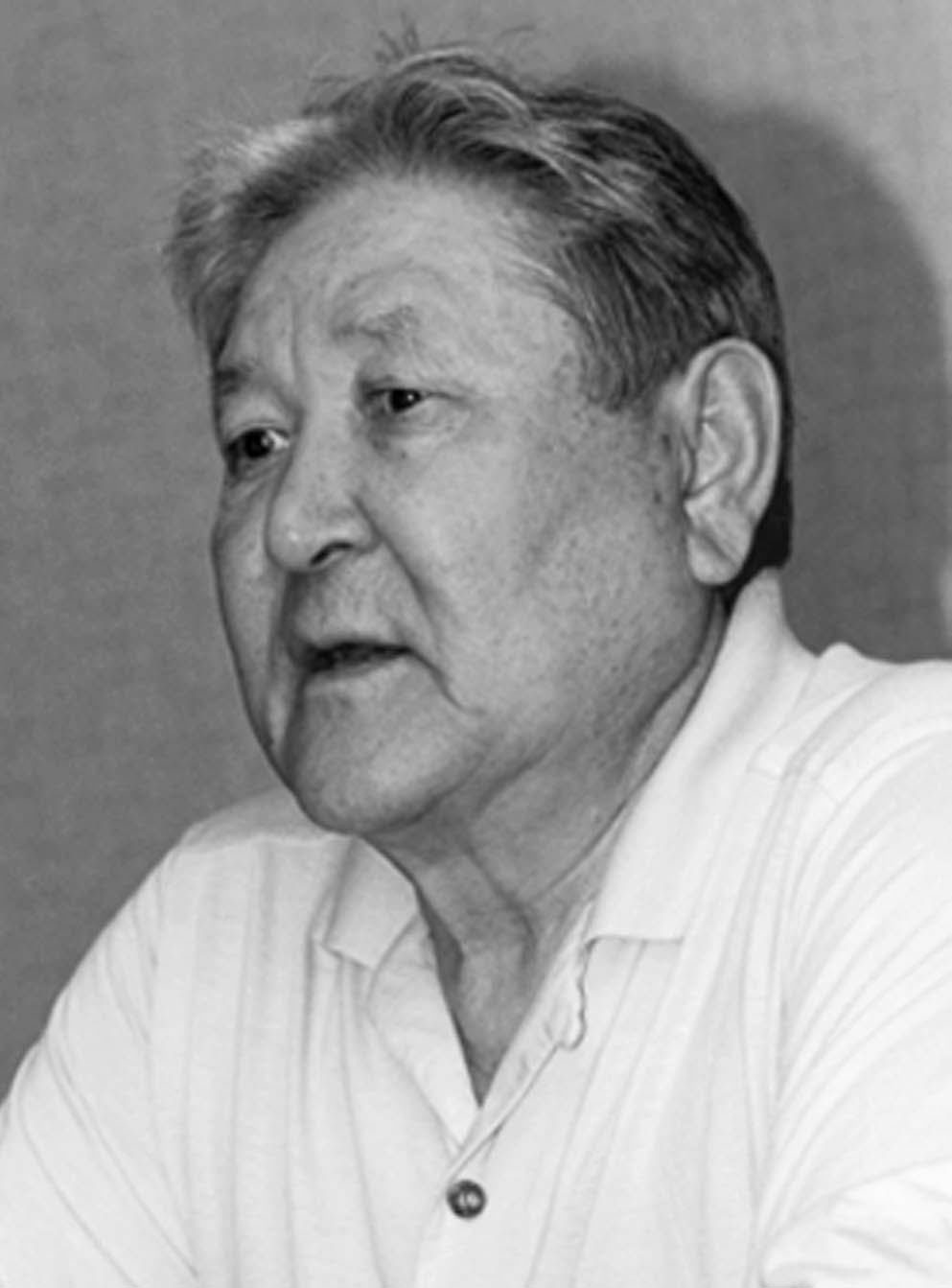

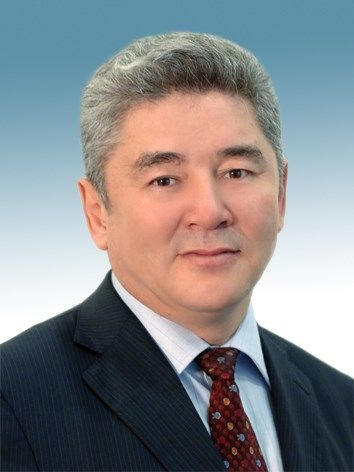

	Majority party	Minority party	Third party
Leader	Nursultan Nazarbayev	Azat Peruashev	Siyazbek Mukashev
Party	Otan	Civic Party	Federation of Trade Unions
Leader since	1 March 1999	17 November 1998	23 October 1992
Last election	25 (Note: as People's Union of Kazakhstan Unity)	New party	5
Seats won	23	13	11
Seat change	▼2	▲13	▲6
Popular vote	1,622,895	590,184
Percentage	30.9%	11.2%
	Fourth party	Fifth party	Sixth party
Leader	Serikbolsyn Abdildin	Romin Madinov	Omirzaq Sarsenov
Party	Communist Party	Agrarian Party	People's Cooperative Party
Leader since	April 1996	6 January 1999	15 December 1994
Last election	2	New party	2
Seats won	3	3	1
Seat change	▲1	▲3	▼1
Popular vote	932,549	663,351
Percentage	17.7%	12.6%
Chairman before election
Marat Ospanov
Otan
Elected Chairman
Zharmakhan Tuyakbay
Otan

Legislative elections were held in Kazakhstan on 10 October 1999, with a second round on 24 October. The result was a victory for the new Otan party (which backed dictator Nursultan Nazarbayev), which won 23 of the 77 seats. Voter turnout was 62.5%.

The main opposition party, Azamat, was not on the ballot. International monitors expressed concerns about the conduct of the elections.

== Background ==
President Nursultan Nazarbayev announced by public decree on 7 July 1999 that the elections to both Houses of the Parliament (the Senate and Assembly) would take place on 17 September 1999 and 10 October 1999 respectively. The former Soviet republic, independent since 1991, wanted to project with these elections a democratic image because its January presidential election had been criticized in the West as unfair. For the first time, 10 of the 77 seats in the Assembly were contested on a party basis and opposition candidates were given access to the media.

== Conduct ==
International and domestic observers described the parliamentary election as flawed. The Organization for Security and Co-operation in Europe, that had deployed 200 observers to monitor the vote, reported that the election had fallen far short of international standards. It was alleged that innocent candidates had been treated unfairly and that voters had been pressured not to vote for certain candidates.

== Results ==
About 60% of the eight million registered voters turned out for the ballot which was a much lower turnout than the one for the 1995 elections, at which voter participation was 79%.

In the election to the Assembly, the ten seats allotted to political parties were decided in the first round on October 10, as well as 20 seats where candidates secured a majority. The remaining 47, where there was no clear majority, were decided at a second round which took place on 24 October.

Kazakhstan's election commission called for new voting to be held in three of the 67 voting districts. The new polls would be held in Atyrau city and the South Kazakhstan and Jambyl regions. The Kazakh election laws do not allow the original candidates to run again in the new voting in these three districts.

For the Senate, on 17 September, deputies in the regional and city assemblies elected the 16 contested seats. Twelve of the new senators were nominated by Maslihats (provinces) and the other four were self-nominated.

Party	National			Constituency			Total seats	+/–
Party	Votes	%	Seats	Votes	%	Seats	Total seats	+/–
Otan	1,622,895	33.17	4			19	23	New
Communist Party of Kazakhstan	932,549	19.06	2			1	3	+1
Agrarian Party of Kazakhstan	663,351	13.56	2			1	3	New
Civic Party of Kazakhstan	590,184	12.06	2			11	13	New
Democratic Party Azamat	240,132	4.91	0			0	0	New
Congress Party of Kazakhstan	148,776	3.04	0			0	0	–1
Alash National Freedom Party	144,945	2.96	0			0	0	New
Party of Kazakhstan's Revival	103,328	2.11	0			0	0	–1
Republican Political Party of Labour	72,721	1.49	0			0	0	New
Federation of Trade Unions of Kazakhstan						11	11	+6
People's Cooperative Party of Kazakhstan						1	1	–1
Independents						23	23	+16
Against all	373,440	7.63	–				–	–
Total	4,892,321	100.00	10			67	77	+10
Valid votes	4,892,321	93.12						
Invalid/blank votes	361,543	6.88						
Total votes	5,253,864	100.00						
Registered voters/turnout	8,411,757	62.46						
Source: Nohlen et al.
