= Sarsenov =

Sarsenov or Sarsenova is a surname. Notable people with the surname include:

- Jambulat Sarsenov
- Samat Sarsenov
- Omirzaq Sarsenov
- Gulnara Sarsenova
