= 2021 Kazakh local elections (disambiguation) =

Local elections were held in Kazakhstan in 2021. The first was on 10 January 2021 and the second on 25 July 2021.

- January 2021 Kazakh local elections
- July 2021 Kazakh local elections
