= Adilet =

Adilet or Ädilet (Kyrgyz: Адилет, Kazakh: Әділет, meaning justice) may refer to:

== Politics ==
- Ädilet, ruling party in Kazakhstan
- Democratic Party Ädilet (2004–2013), dissolved party in Kazakhstan

== People ==
- Adilet Kyshtakbekov (born 1993), Kyrgyzstani runner
- Adilet Davlumbayev (born 1988), Kazakhstani freestyle wrestler
- Adilet Sadybekov (born 2002), Kazakhstani football player
