= 1995 Kazakh legislative election =

Legislative election in Kazakhstan

- 9 December 1995
- All 67 seats in the Mäjılıs; 34 seats needed for a majority
- Turnout: 79.8%
Party	Leader	Seats	+/–
PUKU	Quanysh Sultanov	25	−8
DP	Altynbek Sarsenbayuly	12	New
PUK		7	+3
FTUK	Siyazbek Mukashev	5	−6
UKY		3	+2
CPK	Baidabek Tolepbayev	2	+2
PCPK	Omirzaq Sarsenov	2	New
PKR		1	New
PCK	Olzhas Suleimenov	1	−8
SPK	Ibrahim Tajiyev	1	−7
SMH		1	−4
Independents	–	7	−57
This lists parties that won seats. See the complete results below.
Chairman before	Chairman after
Position established	Marat Ospanov; People's Union of Kazakhstan Unity

Legislative elections were held in Kazakhstan on 9 December 1995, with a second round on 23 December. The result was a victory for the People's Union of Kazakhstan Unity, which won 25 of the 67 seats. Voter turnout was 79.8%.

== Background ==
In March 1994, the first post-independence general elections for the former unicameral Parliament took place. A year later, Kazakhstan's Constitutional Council invalidated this poll and declared the legislature illegal. President of the Republic Nursultan Nazarbayev thereupon announced the dissolution of the Parliament and plans to rule by decree pending new elections. A majority of the 177 Deputies challenged the dissolution.

On 30 August 1995, a new constitution providing, inter alia, for a smaller bicameral legislature was approved by popular referendum. On 2 October, the President announced the December election dates.

== Conduct ==
The overall conduct of the polling was overseen by the Central Election Commission (OSK). According to it, 285 candidates (128 self-nominated, 157 registered to parties or public associations) ran for the 67 Mäjilis seats. As for the Senate, 49 candidates vied for the 40 elective seats, with 14 of the 20 constituencies being uncontested. There were a series of limitations on pre-election campaigning.

The 9 December polling day for the Mäjilis was monitored by domestic and international observers and saw a reported turnout of over 79%. Observers from the Organization for Security and Co-operation in Europe questioned this figure, citing a number of irregularities, including multiple voting by the same individual. At the end of the day, only 41 candidates were declared elected with the required thresholds. Two weeks later, on 23 December, another 13 Deputies were chosen. Finally, on 4 February 1996, the remaining 13 seats were filled. Of the opposition parties, many boycotted the poll.

== Results ==
Party	Votes	%	Seats	+/–
People's Union of Kazakhstan Unity			25	–8
Democratic Party			12	New
Peasants Union of Kazakhstan			7	+3
Federation of Trade Unions of Kazakhstan			5	–6
Union of Kazakhstan's Youth			3	+2
Communist Party of Kazakhstan			2	+2
People's Cooperative Party of Kazakhstan			2	New
Party of Kazakhstan's Revival			1	New
People's Congress of Kazakhstan			1	–8
Socialist Party of Kazakhstan			1	–7
Social Movement "Harmony"			1	–4
Independents			7	–56
Total			67	–110
Valid votes	7,120,592	99.54		
Invalid/blank votes	32,851	0.46		
Total votes	7,153,443	100.00		
Registered voters/turnout	8,959,543	79.84		
Source: Nohlen et al.

== Aftermath ==
On 30 January the newly constituted Parliament met in joint session for the first time. The Council of Ministers was headed by Prime Minister Akezhan Kazhegeldin.
