= Altynshash Jaganova =

Kazakh writer, activist and politician (born 1943)

- Алтыншаш Жағанова
- Born: December 23, 1943 (age 82); Astrakhan District, Akmola Region, Kazakh SSR
- Education: Maxim Gorky Literature Institute
- Occupations: Activist, novelist, journalist, playwright
- Political party: The Revival of Kazakhstan Party (January 1995–October 2003) Rukhaniyat Party (April 2003–March 2010)
- Spouse: Anes Sarai
- Awards: Order of Kurmet; Medal "For the Development of Virgin Lands"; Honoured Figure of Kazakhstan

Altynshash Qaiyrjanqyzy Jaganova (Kazakh: Алтыншаш Қайыржанқызы Жағанова, Altynşaş Qaiyrjanqyzy Jağanova; born 29 December 1943) is a Kazakh novelist, journalist, playwright, activist, and politician. Since 1988, she has served as the editor-in-chief of Kazakhstan Ayelderi (lit. 'Women of Kazakhstan').

== Biography ==
Altynshash Jaganova was born on 23 December 1943 in the Astrakhan District of the Akmola Region, Kazakh SSR. In 1974, she graduated from the Maxim Gorky Literature Institute with a degree in literature.

== Career ==
=== Rukhaniyat party ===
In 1995, Altynshash Jaganova founded and led the Rukhaniyat Party. On 30 October 2003, it was registered by the Ministry of Justice of Kazakhstan. The aim of the new party was to promote civil and interethnic harmony. At the seventh party congress in March 2010, she assumed her position as party leader. She commented on her departure from the post of party leader:

"I thought about it a lot, but nevertheless, I decided that the party should be led by young people. Our young people have long ripened, and not only ripened but also overripe. And we did not give the young people the opportunity to develop, we did not give way to them. But life changes, so we must change. Therefore, Serikzhan Mambetalin was elected chairman of the party"

According to the new leader of Rukhaniyat, Serikzhan Mambetalin, Altynshash Jaganova became an honorary member of the party:

“We decided to award A. Jaganova the title of honorary founder of the Rukhaniyat party. Our young people are grateful for her support, and we think that she will always be with us and give us advice”

In December 2011, she was excluded from the party for slandering its leadership and was also accused of losing ties with the party and denying its ideology. Earlier, Altynshash Jaganova declared the illegality of nominating candidates for deputies of the parliament from the Rukhaniyat Party, referring to the fact that she held the seal and documents of the party. In 2012, during the congress of Rukhaniyat, Altynshash Jaganova was again elected as the chairperson of the party.

== Creative ==
Altynshash Jaganova is known as the author of numerous publications in the press and stories about the fate of women, friendship, and brotherhood. Her first book, Amina, Wolves and the End of the World (1967), was followed by Akkoyan: The White Hound (1970), Minx (1972), and Echo in a Circle. Her plays, including It All Started with Apa, Heavy Rain, Those Who Crossed the Line, Restless Woman, Agony, and Metastasis, have been staged at the Kazakh Drama Theater named after M. Auezov, several regional theaters, and the Uzbek Academic Drama Theater named after Hamza. Based on her script, a full-length feature film titled Muslima was produced, and a performance was staged at the German Drama Theater in Almaty.

== Awards and titles ==
- Order of Kurmet (15.12.2008) .
- Medals
- Honoured figure of Kazakhstan (2000)

== Family ==
- First Husband: Askar Suleimenov (1938–1992) was a Soviet and Kazakh writer, literary critic, and playwright. He was a laureate of the State Prize of the Republic of Kazakhstan (1996).
- Son: Alisher Askarovich Suleimenov (born 1965) is a Kazakh film actor and director. He is a laureate of the prize from the Youth Union of the Republic of Kazakhstan.
- Daughter: Karakoz Askarovna Suleimenova (born 1967) is a Kazakh film and theater actress, as well as a TV presenter. She is an Honored Worker of the Republic of Kazakhstan, a laureate of the State Prize "Daryn," and a knight of the Order of Kurmet.
- Second Husband: Anes Tulendievich Saray (born 1937) is a Soviet and Kazakh writer, playwright, and journalist. He is a laureate of the State Prize of the Republic of Kazakhstan (1992) and was honored as a Honored Worker of Kazakhstan (2002).
