= Romin Madinov =

Kazakh politician (born 1961)

- Ромин Мадинов
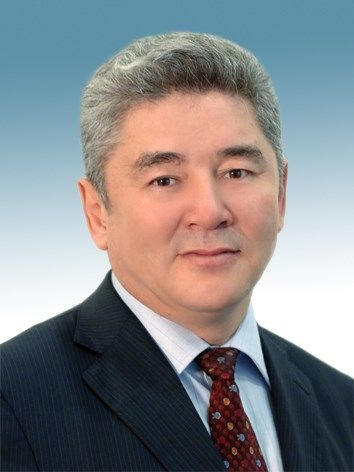
- Official portrait, 2011

Member of the Mäjilis
- In office 10 October 1999 – 25 March 2016

Chairman of Agrarian Party
- In office 6 January 1999 – 22 November 2006
- Preceded by: Position established
- Succeeded by: Position abolished

Personal details
- Born: 22 October 1961 (age 64) Qyzyl Tu, Kokchetav Oblast, Kazakh SSR, Soviet Union
- Party: Nur Otan (2006−present)
- Other political affiliations: Agrarian Party (1999−2006)

Romin Rizūly Madinov (Kazakh: Ромин Ризұлы Мадинов; born 22 October 1961) is a Kazakh politician who served as a member of the Mäjilis from 1999 to 2016 and was a Chairman of the Agrarian Party from 1999 until it was merged with the Otan party in 2006.

== Biography ==
Born in the village of Qyzyl Tu in the Kokchetav Oblast of Kazakh SSR, Madinov graduated from the Omsk State University in 1988. In the mid-1990s, Madinov founded the Agrocenter Company.

On 6 January 1999, the Agrarian Party held its congress for which Madinov became the chairman. It became registered on 16 March 1999 by the Ministry of Justice of Kazakhstan. In September 1999, Madinov was elected to the Mäjilis in the 1999 legislative election, winning only 3 seats. On 28 July 2004, the Agrarian Party formed a bloc with the Civic Party. Madinov led the bloc which won 11 seats in the 2004 election.

On 22 November 2006, at the 7th All-Congress of the Agrarian Party, a decision was made to incorporate the party into Otan. In the beginning of 2007, Madinov was interviewed by Khabar television channel and said that President Nursultan Nazarbayev should be given the opportunity to rule as much as he wants. On 4 July 2007, at the XI Extraordinary Congress of Nur Otan, Madinov was elected to the bureau of the party's Political Council.

In the 2007 legislative election, Madinov ran as a Nur Otan party candidate. The party won 88.41% of the vote and was the only one that overcame the 7% threshold.

== 2009 lawsuit ==
On 16 January 2009, a judge of the Medeu District Court of Almaty, Ruslan Suleymanov, ruled on a lawsuit by Madinov about infringing on his honor and dignity against the opposition newspaper Tasjargan and its journalist Almas Kusherbaev. According to the court's decision, the newspaper and its journalist were to pay 3 million tenge to Madinov who had requested 300 million tenge in the lawsuit, as well as publish a refutation of the article “Poor Latifundist,” which became the primary reason the trial. The Almaty City Court's appeal on the newspaper and it's journalist not only cancel the decision of the district court, but also increased the amount of payment in favor of Madinov to 30 million tenge. According to the advocates of the newspaper and the journalist, the content of the article was about the economic feasibility of raising the price of bread, and it was debatable, analytical in nature with the hypotheses and methods characteristic of this genre in order to draw attention to the problem in question, and not to Madinov's persona.
