= Serik Sultangali =

Kazakh politician and businessman

- Серік Сұлтанғали

Chairman of Adal
- In office 26 April 2013 – 26 April 2022
- Preceded by: Office established
- Succeeded by: Office abolished

Chairman of Rukhaniyat Party
- In office 9 February 2013 – 26 April 2013
- Preceded by: Serikjan Mämbetalin
- Succeeded by: Office abolished

Personal details
- Born: 17 April 1953 (age 73) Janalash, Kazakh SSR, Soviet Union
- Party: ADAL (2013–2022)
- Other political affiliations: Rukhaniyat Party (until 2013)
- Spouse: Zamira Isaevna
- Children: Asem, Aigerim
- Education: Satbayev University

Serik Sultangaliuly Sultangali (Kazakh: Серік Сұлтанғалиұлы Сұлтанғали, Serık Sūltanğaliūly Sūltanğali; born 17 April 1953) is a Kazakh politician and businessman, who served as chairman of the Adal political party from 2013 to 2022. He was also the chairman of the KazTransGaz company.

== Early life and career ==
Sultangali was born in the village of Janalash in Almaty Region. In 1977, he graduated from the Satbayev University with a degree in urban architecture.

After graduating, Sultangali worked as an architect of the Kazgorstroyproekt Institute, then the Oktyabrsky District of GlavUAGA. In 1984, he became the senior inspector and assistant to the chairman of the Almaty City Executive Committee. From 1989, Sultangali was the chairman of the Alatau village council until becoming the head of the City Executive Committee and the Department of Housing of the Almaty City Administration in 1990.

In 1993, he became the chairman of the board of Concern Altyn-Alma JSC and from 1994, Sultangali worked as the First Deputy Head of the Almaty City Administration. From 1995 to 2004, he was the chairman of the board and president of closed Aysel-Kazakhstan JSC. In May 2004, Sultangali became the deputy general director for Capital Construction of KazTransGas JSC. From February 2005, he worked as general director of the company until becoming the chairman of the board of Zhetysu Social and Entrepreneurial Corporation. In February 2009, Sultangali became the chairman of KazTransGas JSC again and served in this position until December 2015.

== Political career ==
On 9 February 2013, Sultangali was unanimously chosen to be the Chairman of Rukhaniyat Party. Few months later on 26 April 2013, the party merged with Democratic Party Adilet, forming Adal. From there, Sultangali was unanimously elected to be chairman.
