= Agrarian Party of Kazakhstan =

Defunct political party in Kazakhstan

Agrarian Party of Kazakhstan Қазақстан аграрлық партиясы
- Abbreviation: QAP
- Chairman: Romin Madinov
- Founded: 6 January 1999
- Registered: 16 March 1999
- Dissolved: 22 December 2006
- Merged into: Nur Otan
- Ideology: Agrarianism
- National affiliation: AIST (2004–2006)
- Colors: Yellow

The Agrarian Party of Kazakhstan (Kazakh: Қазақстан аграрлық партиясы, romanized: Qazaqstan argrarlyq partiasy, QAP; Russian: Аграрная партия Казахстана, romanized: Agrarnaya partiya Kazakhstana) was a political party in Kazakhstan. The party remained active for just under seven years before it was dissolved on 22 December 2006, and incorporated into the new Nur Otan party.

== History ==
The Agrarian Party of Kazakhstan (QAP) was founded on 6 January 1999. The party's aim was to protect the social, cultural, civil, political, and economic rights of rural residents and agricultural workers to promote the strengthening of statehood within the nation. The party consisted of primarily agricultural workers and farmers, private farms, and rural companies and associations.

The QAP was registered with the Ministry of Justice on 16 March 1999, and would undergo reregistration process again on 6 March 2003. For the entire time of the party's existence, its chairman, Romin Madinov, served as a deputy of the Mäjilis. The party offices in the 12 regions of the nations and some cities, including Astana and Almaty. At its peak, the Agrarian Party had more than 90,000 members.

On 27 September 2005, the VI Congress of the party was held in Petropavl, with the participation of the President of Kazakhstan, Nursultan Nazarbayev. At the congress, the party declared its support for Nazarbayev’s candidacy in the 2005 presidential election and announced the Agrarian Party of Kazakhstan’s decision to join the People’s Coalition in support of the incumbent head of state.

On 22 December 2006, the QAP was formally abolished and merged with the ruling Nur Otan party, led by President Nursultan Nazarbayev.

== Election results ==
In the 1999 Kazakh legislative election held on October 10 and October 24, the QAP received 663,351 votes or 13.56% of the popular vote, which provided the party with 3 out of the 77 seats in the Mazhilis. In the 2004 Kazakh legislative election held on 19 September and 3 October, the party participated in the Agrarian-Industrial Union of Workers (AIST) bloc, which was formed jointly with the Civic Party of Kazakhstan. The AIST bloc received 336,177 votes or 7.07% of the popular vote, which provided the bloc with 11 out of the 77 seats in the Mazhilis.

== See also ==
- List of political parties in Kazakhstan
