= People's Cooperative Party of Kazakhstan =

People's Cooperative Party of Kazakhstan Қазақстан халықтық кооператив партиясы Qazaqstan halyqtyq kooperativ partiiasy
- Abbreviation: QHKP
- Chairman: Omirzaq Sarsenov
- Founded: 15 December 1994; 31 years ago
- Dissolved: 9 November 2002; 23 years ago
- Merged into: Otan
- Membership (1995): 49,000

The People's Cooperative Party of Kazakhstan (Kazakh: Қазақстан халықтық кооператив партиясы, romanized: Qazaqstan halyqtyq kooperativ partiiasy) was a political party in Kazakhstan. It was created on 15 December 1994 and was led by Kazakh politician and businessman Omirzaq Sarsenov. The party was considered to be pro-government with its platforms being centrist and was eventually merged with the ruling-party Otan on 9 November 2002.

== History ==
The People's Cooperative Party of Kazakhstan (QHKP) was created on 15 December 1994 by a parent company of the consumer cooperation system in Kazakhstan which was Kazpotrebsoyuz. The Chairman of the Board of Kazpotrebsoyuzb, Omirzaq Sarsenov, was chosen to lead the party. It became registered on 20 February 1995.

The QHKP was created primarily as a political organization, called upon to carry out appropriate ideological work among the rural population, including the poorest part of the population, who, as a result of the radical privatization policies, lost opportunities to maintain their former way of life and did not get the opportunity to "fit into the market." In 1995, many political events took place that year which was a referendum on extending Nursultan Nazarbayev's presidential powers, and the dissolution of the 1993 Kazakh Constitution. The QHKP urged people to take part in another referendum by supporting President Nazarbayev's increased powers and the redraft of the Constitution.

The peak of the party's campaigning and financial activity came in 1995, when the Birlik newspaper was published. The party's leadership held plenary sessions and meetings political council, and took numerous appeals. The QHKP consisted of 19 regional, 210 district, 5 city and 1223 primary organizations. With the assistance of local administrations, the leaders of the QHKP managed to gather 42,000 members. In 1995, the party addressed the situations regarding private ownership of land, bilingualism, and the events in Chechnya. These appeals to one degree or another coincided the policies of the Kazakh government.

In 23 October 1995, a party congress was held, which approved the QHKP's election platform which advocated the building of a civil society in Kazakhstan, the realization of civic customs and freedoms, strengthening the rule of law, advocates a socially oriented economy and a regulated market based on a variety of forms of ownership. The party supported in restricting access to Western "mass culture" due to its characteristics in "violence, cruelty, and sex scenes." The QHKP also opposed private ownership of agricultural land, believing that the land should belong to all who work on it, be leased and inherited for life. The party won 2 seats in the 1995 Kazakh legislative election.

After 1995, as a result of the referendum which centralized of power structure, the party's position largely weakened. The lack of financial resources began to affect Birlik newspaper ceased to be published. The QHKP lost a seat in the 1999 legislative election.

On 9 November 2002, at the 4th Extraordinary Congress of Otan party, the QHKP, along with the Republican Political Labor Party, merged into Otan, thus ending the party's existence.
