= Siyazbek Mukashev =

Kazakhstani politician

- Сиязбек Мұқашев

Chairman of Federation of Trade Unions
- In office 23 October 1992 – 28 January 2013
- Preceded by: Ermek Jaqselekov
- Succeeded by: Äbilgazy Qusaiynov

Personal details
- Born: 7 May 1939 (age 87) Aqshi, Kazakh SSR, Soviet Union
- Party: QKP (until 1991)
- Children: Nazigül, Serik
- Education: Semey Zooveterinary Institute

Siyazbek Onerbekuly Mukashev (Kazakh: Сиязбек Өнербекұлы Мұқашев, Siiazbek Önerbekūly Mūqaşev; born 7 May 1939) is a retired Kazakh politician who served as the Chairman of Federation of Trade Unions of Kazakhstan from 1992 to 2013.

== Biography ==
=== Early life and education ===
Mukashev was born in the village of Aqshi in Almaty Region in 1939. In 1962, he graduated from the Semey Zooveterinary Institute with a degree in veterinary.

=== Early career ===
After graduating, Mukashev worked as a veterinarian at the Chubartau Regional Veterinary Clinic then as chief veterinarian of the Koktalsky State Farm at the Ayaguz Production Department. In 1964, he became the Deputy Secretary of the Ayaguz Rural Production Committee of the Komsomol and then in 1965 as First Secretary of the Ayaguz District Committee of the Komsomol. From 1966, Mukashev worked as responsible organizer of the Central Committee of the Komsomol of Kazakhstan until becoming the First Secretary of the Taldy-Kurgan Regional Committee in 1968. From 1973, he served as Second Secretary of the Sarkand District Committee of the Communist Party of Kazakhstan (QKP) then as chairman of the Regional Executive Committee. In 1975, Mukashev became the inspector of the Department of Organizational and Party Work of the Central Committee of the QKP where he worked until becoming the First Secretary of the Taldy-Kurgan District Committee of the QKP in 1978.

From 1983, he served as chairman of the Taldy-Kurgan Regional Trade Union. During this period, Mukashev made personal contribution to the socio-economic development of the region, increasing the authority of trade unions in protecting the rights and interests of the working person. In 1990, he was appointed as the deputy chairman of the Council of the Federation of Trade Unions of Kazakhstan (QRKF).

=== Chairman of QRKF (1992–2013) ===
On 23 October 1992, the 4th Plenum of the Federation of Trade Unions was held from which Mukashev was elected as a chairman. He participated in drafting law on trade unions which was passed in 1993. This gave every Kazakhstani citizen protection for their social and labor rights and interests. Under his leadership, the trade union contested its candidates for the 1994 Kazakh legislative election with an election slogan "A decent life for a working man!". After the parliamentary elections of 1999 and 2004, the QRKF grew in numbers and strengthened qualitatively. It lobbied the Embek MP group, where under Mukashev proposed and drafted bills such as the Labor Code, bills on state benefits to families with children, on amendments and additions to the law on pensions, on state targeted social assistance, on social protection of citizens affected by nuclear tests at the Semipalatinsk Test Site, employment of the population, on culture. On 20 November 2007, he became a member of the Council of the Public Chamber under the Mazhilis. However, during his tenure, the QRKF maintained its close relations with the Kazakh government. The membership of QRKF decreased significantly from 7 million in 1990 to just 2 million in 2012. The QRKF attempted to become a member of the International Trade Union Confederation which was never approved and its bid received criticism from figures such as the president of Labor Confederation of Russia Boris Kravchenko who criticized the labor union for not supporting the striking oil workers in 2011 which led to Zhanaozen massacre that resulted in the deaths of 14 oil workers. On 28 January 2013, Mukashev resigned from his post as the chairman and was succeeded by Äbilgazy Qusaiynov.
