= Village cooperative =

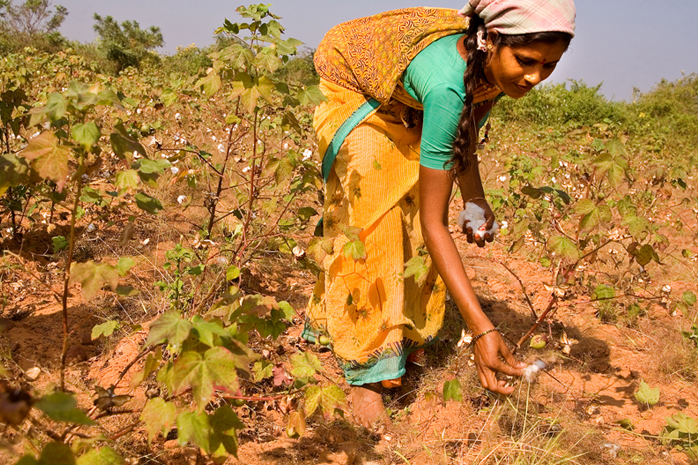
illustrative

Village cooperatives are cooperatives in rural areas that are engaged in the provision of community needs with agricultural activities. Village cooperatives may also be defined as an umbrella organization of social and economic character and as a forum for the development of rural economic activities organized by the community and for the community itself.
