= Rukhaniyat Party =

Rukhaniyat Party «Руханият» партиясы
- Leader: Serik Sultangali
- Founded: 1995
- Dissolved: 12 November 2013
- Merged into: Birlik
- Headquarters: Almaty
- Ideology: Green politics

The Rukhaniyat Party (Kazakh: «Руханият» партиясы; Russian: Партия «Руханият») was a political party in Kazakhstan. At the legislative elections, 19 September and 3 October 2004, the party won 0.4% of the popular vote and no seats. In the 18 August 2007 Assembly elections, the party won again 0.4% of the popular vote and no seats.

The party was founded in 1995 by Altynshash Zhaganova.

The name Rukhaniyat means spirituality, from the root Rukh. See the discussion of the etymology of the word spirit for a brief discussion of the Arabic origins of this word.
