= Agrarian-Industrial Union of Workers =

Agrarian-Industrial Union of Workers Kazakh: Еңбекшілердің аграрлық-индустриялық одағы Russian: Аграрно-индустриальный союз трудящихся
- Abbreviation: AIST
- Leader: Romin Madinov
- Founded: 28 July 2004; 20 years ago
- Dissolved: 10 November 2006; 18 years ago
- Merged into: Nur Otan

The Agrarian-Industrial Union of Workers (Kazakh: Еңбекшілердің аграрлық-индустриялық одағы, romanized: Eñbekşılerdin agrarlyq-industrialdyq odağy; Russian: Аграрно-индустриальный союз трудящихся, romanized: Agrarno-industrial'nyy soyuz trudyashchikhsya, AIST) was a political alliance in Kazakhstan, formed by the Agrarian Party of Kazakhstan and the Civic Party of Kazakhstan on 28 July 2004. The bloc was led by Agrarian Party chairman, Romin Madinov, who served as Mäjilis deputy.

At the 2004 legislative election, 19 September and 3 October 2004, the AIST bloc won 7.1% of the popular vote and 11 out of 77 seats.

Following the election, the AIST continued its political activities in the Mäjilis until both member Agrarian and Civic parties in the bloc were absorbed into the ruling Nur Otan party in late 2006.
