= Jambulat Sarsenov =

Kazakh businessman

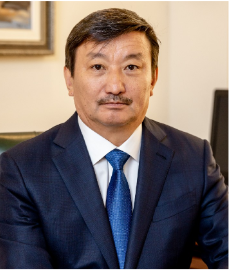
- Born: November 21, 1961 (age 64); South Kazakhstan region
- Occupations: business professional, public figure
- Spouse: Aiman Sarsenova
- Children: sons Zhantemir (2003) and Alken (2008), daughters Aruzhan (2001) and Janiya (2012)
- Parent(s): Zhakiya Sarsenov, Izada Sarsenova
- Awards

Jambulat Sarsenov (Kazakh: Жамболат Жақияұлы Сәрсенов, Jambolat Jaqiiaūly Särsenov; born November 21, 1961, in the city of Shymkent, South-Kazakhstan region) is a Kazakh businessperson.

Vice President of WPC Energy.

Honorary Consul of Hungary in the Republic of Kazakhstan, Co-chair of the Kazakh-Hungarian Business Council.

== Biography ==
In 1978, he graduated from the secondary school №1 in Shymkent, South Kazakhstan region. In 1985, he graduated from the I.I. Mechnikov St.-Petersburg State Medical Academy with a degree in health care organization and management; completed extramural studies at the T. Ryskulov Kazakh Institute of Economics majoring in public administration; graduated from the Diplomatic Academy of the Eurasian National University in Astana specializing in international relations; and completed the Eni “Master in Petroleum Business” Program.

Between 2004-2005 he served as General Director of “KazRosGaz” JSC; from June to December 2005 – Chief of Staff in NC KazMunayGas JSC; from December 2005 – General Director of the Union of Legal Entities "Kazakhstan Association of Oil, Gas and Energy Sector Organizations KAZENERGY. From November 2012 to December 2021 — Vice Chairman of the Union of Legal Entities “Kazakhstan Association of Oil, Gas and Energy Sector Organizations KAZENERGY.

In 2013-2014, he was Vice Chairman of the Energy Charter Conference. In 2015, he was appointed as Special Envoy of the Energy Charter Secretary General for a fixed term of two years, and in 2017 he was re-appointed to this post. Since December 2015, he has been serving as the Honorary Consul of Hungary in the Republic of Kazakhstan. In July 2017, he was elected Vice President for Marketing and member of the Executive Committee of the World Petroleum Council (WPC). This decision was made within the framework of the 22nd World Petroleum Congress in Istanbul, the Republic of Turkey. In December 2021, he was re-elected to this position for a second term.

In September 2023, at the WPC Energy Council meeting held in Calgary, Canada, he was elected Vice President for Diversity, Inclusion and Youth at WPC Energy.

== Professional activity ==
As a member of the WPC Executive Committee, he takes part in the development of integration and energy dialogue between Kazakhstan and the world energy community.

Sarsenov took part in the development of boxing in Kazakhstan and led the development of the new charter and structure of the Kazakhstan Boxing Federation to bring it to conformity with the AIBA requirements (2008).

As Vice President for International Relations of the Kazakhstan Boxing Federation, he was the first in the AIBA history who signed the WSB franchise agreement between the WSB LLC and the Kazakhstan Boxing Federation on January 27, 2010, in Xiamen, China.

As Co-chairman of the Kazakh-Hungarian Business Council (KHBC), which regularly conducts special events for the business circles of both countries, he is involved in the development of the trade and economic cooperation. The appointment of Jambulat Sarsenov as the Honorary Consul of Hungary in the Republic of Kazakhstan is a sign of high trust from the Government of Hungary, emphasizing the interest of Hungarian citizens in promoting their ideas and initiatives in Kazakhstan. In November 2017, he was awarded the Hungarian Order of Merit for his contribution to the development of Hungarian-Kazakh economic and trade relations, the promotion of Hungarian business interests, and the preservation of cultural and historical ties between the countries.

Being a founder of MEDIKER medical network, he participates in the development of private medicine in Kazakhstan. The company’s subsidiary “Mediker Industrial Medicine” that provides medical services at production facilities became a winner of the “Altyn Sapa” Award of the President of the Republic of Kazakhstan, which was one of the most important achievements in the company’s activity. The company also became an official partner and exclusive provider of medical services at the international specialized exhibition EXPO 2017 in Astana.

As a member of the Executive Committee of WPC Energy and a representative of the Kazakh National Committee (KNC) of WPC Energy, Jambulat Sarsenov participated in the organization and conduct of one of the largest global industry events — the World Petroleum Congress, held in December 2021 in Houston, USA. The Kazakhstan Ministerial Session, organized by the Ministry of Energy of the Republic of Kazakhstan and the KNC within the framework of this Congress, attracted the attention of not only the heads of industry ministries but also the entire international expert community. Moreover, at this Congress, Kazakhstan was granted the right to host the WPC Youth Forum in 2022.

He speaks Kazakh, Russian and English.

== Awards ==
- Order of Kurmet (2010)
- Order of Parasat (2015)
- Order of Merit of the Republic of Hungary (2017)
- Medal: 10th Anniversary of the Constitution of the Republic of Kazakhstan (2005)
- Medal: 10th Anniversary of Astana (2008)
- 1st Degree Medal Atameken (2009)
- Medal: 20th Anniversary of Independence of the Republic of Kazakhstan (2011)
- Medal: 20th Anniversary of the Committee for Emergency Situations of the Ministry of Internal Affairs of the Republic of Kazakhstan (2015)
- Medal: 25th Anniversary of Independence of the Republic of Kazakhstan (2016)
- Medal: 20th Anniversary of Astana (2018)
- Medal: Halyk Algysy (The People's Gratitude Medal) (2020)
- Medal: 10th Anniversary of KAZENERGY (2015)
