= Omirzaq Sarsenov =

Soviet and Kazakh politician

- Өмірзақ Сәрсенов

Member of the Congress of People's Deputies of the Soviet Union
- In office 1989–1991

Member of the Supreme Soviet of the Kazakh SSR
- In office 1991 – 28 January 1993
- In office 1985–1989

Chairman of People's Cooperative Party
- In office 15 December 1994 – 9 November 2002
- Preceded by: Office established
- Succeeded by: Office abolished

Personal details
- Born: 12 April 1942 (age 84) Bakanas, Kazakh SSR. Soviet Union
- Party: Nur Otan (from 2002)
- Other political affiliations: QHKP (1994–2002)
- Children: 5
- Education: Karaganda Economic University

Omirzaq Sarsenuly Sarsenov (Kazakh: Өмірзақ Сәрсенұлы Сәрсенов, romanized: Ömırzaq Särsenūly Särsenov; born 12 April 1942) is a retired Soviet and Kazakh politician who served as a member of the Supreme Soviet of the Kazakh SSR from 1985 to 1989 and 1991 to 1993, member of the Congress of People's Deputies of the Soviet Union from 1989 until its dissolution in 1991, Chairman of People's Cooperative Party of Kazakhstan (QHKP) from 15 December 1994 until its merger with Otan on 9 November 2002.

== Biography ==
=== Early life and career ===
Sarsenov was born in the village of Bakanas in Almaty Region. He graduated from the Karaganda Economic University with a degree as an economist trader. He began his career as a foreman of a tractor brigade in 1962, then a mechanical engineer, chief mechanical engineer of a State Farm. From 1968 to 1977, he worked as a store director, chairman of a state farm, deputy chairman and then chairman of the Board of Balkhash Regional Consumer Union of the Alma-Ata Region. Sarsenov continued serving in the system of consumer cooperatives until being appointed as chairman of Kazpotrebsoyuz in 1985.

=== Political career ===
In 1985, he became an MP of the Supreme Soviet of the Kazakh SSR where he served until being elected as MP of the Congress of People's Deputies of the Soviet Union in 1989. After the Congress of People's Deputies was dissolved in 1991, Sarsenov was reinstated as MP of the Supreme Soviet of Kazakh SSR. On 15 December 1994, the founding congress of the People's Cooperative Party of Kazakhstan (QHKP) where Sarsenov was chosen to be the party's chairman. The QHKP managed to take 2 seats in the 1995 legislative election but eventually its political position weakened with the QHKP losing seat in 1999. Sarsenov offered for the party unite with other forces with centrist ideologies. On 9 November 2002, at the Extraordinary Congress of Otan, the party ended its existence and became merged with Otan. Sarsenov worked in President Nursultan Nazarbayev's campaign headquarters in 1999 and 2005 respectively. In 2005, he became a member of the Political Council of Otan and served as an advisor to the Prime Minister of Kazakhstan from 2008.

=== Post-political career ===
In 2008, during the Great Recession, in the Balkhash District, Sarsenov created a Bakanas Rural Consumer Cooperative.
