= Ädilet Democratic Party =

Democratic Party Adilet «Әділет» Демократиялық партиясы
- Chairman: Maksut Narikbaev (first); Tolegen Sydykhov (last)
- Founded: 29 April 2004; 22 years ago
- Dissolved: 26 April 2013; 13 years ago
- Merged into: Birlik
- Headquarters: Almaty
- Ideology: Social liberalism Social democracy
- Continental affiliation: Forum of Socialists of the CIS Countries

The Ädilet , officially "Ädilet" Democratic Party (Kazakh: «Әділет» демократиялық партиясы, «Ädılet» Demokratialyq Partiasy, lit. '"Justice" Democratic Party'; DPA) was a political party in Kazakhstan that existed from 2004 to 2013 and was led by chairman Tolegen Sydykhov. The party numbered around 70,000 members, was built on a territorial basis, and had branches in all regions of the countries and in the cities of Astana and Almaty.

It was dissolved on 26 April 2013 after merging with the Rukhaniyat Party to form Birik.

== History ==
The party was founded on 29 April 2004 as the "Democratic Party of Kazakhstan" on the basis of the social and political movement "For Legal Kazakhstan", which functioned since the beginning of 2002. Maksut Narikbaev became the chairman of the party.

At the 2004 Kazakh legislative election which took place on 19 September and 3 October 2004, the party won 0.8% of the popular vote and seat which was held by Zeinulla Alshimbaev from a single-member constituency.

The party took part in the country's election commissions. In the 2005 presidential elections, 185 people were elected from the DPA to the election commissions. The Adilet was a part of the People's Coalition of Kazakhstan, which included pro-government political parties and a number of NGOs who supported President Nursultan Nazarbayev and his political and economic course.

On 14 April 2006, at the 4th Congress of the Adilet, it was decided to rename the party to the Democratic Party Adilet and the post of the party chairman was turned into co-chairmen who were Narikbaev, Alshimbaev, Akhmedzhan, Ongarbaev, and Sydykhov. On 8 July 2007, at the 5th Congress of the Adilet, the party was merged with Ak Zhol Democratic Party. On 20 October 2007, at the 6th Extraordinary Congress of the Adilet, the merger of both parties became split.

On 29 April 2008, at the building of the Gabit Musrepov Kazakh State Academic Theater for Children and Youth, the 7th Congress of the Adilet was held. Of the 245 elected delegates, 201 delegates took part in the work of the congress. Representatives of political parties, international, non-governmental organizations, mass media, well-known public and state figures, as well as a representative of the Russian political party A Just Russia, Alexander Romanovich were present at the congress as guests.

On 24 April 2009, the party held a party conference dedicated to the 5th anniversary of its founding.

At the 2012 legislative election, the party won 0.66% of vote and winning no seats. In a widespread statement, the Adilet congratulated all the winning parties, stressing that "despite the bleak election results for our party, we believe that the country won in general, Kazakhstan won".

In March 2012, the party's chairman Maksut Narikbaev voluntarily vacated the post, explaining this by the need to rejuvenate the party leadership. In April 2012, at the congress of the party, Tolegen Sydykhov, who had previously been the First Deputy Chairman, was chosen to succeed Narikbaev.

On 26 April 2013, the Adilet and Rukhaniyat parties united into a new political party Birlik, as a result of which the Adilet ceased to exist.

== Ideology ==
The party was founded with the aim of consolidating the civil will of the citizens of Kazakhstan by strengthening legal statehood, strengthening interethnic harmony and political stability in every possible way, and instilling true feelings of patriotism in Kazakhs. The party considered its main task to be the construction of a legal democratic social state in Kazakhstan, the creation of an effective, advanced and developed economic system, the formation of a civil society.

The Adilet has constantly positioned itself as a party of the middle class and pro-business.

== Structure ==
The supreme governing body of the Adilet was the Congress, which, according to the party's charter, was held once every four years. In practice, however, the Congresses were held more frequently. The congress has the authority to nominate its members to elected positions in government bodies, local self-government bodies and representative bodies of Kazakhstan; form the Central Committee of the party and its leader; elect party co-chairs; conduct a financial audit of the party's executive bodies; make decisions on the reorganization or liquidation of the party.

The Central Committee of the party was engaged in the current organizational activities in the period between the work of the Congresses. The number and composition of this body is determined at the Party Congress. Meetings of the Central Committee are held at least once a year after it is convened by one of the party's co-chairs.

The general leadership of the party between the sessions of the Central Committee of the party was carried out by the Political Council and the co-chairs of the party.
