= Aqshi =

Aqshi Ақши
- Village
- Location in Kazakhstan Aqshi (Asia)
- Coordinates: 43°59′24″N 76°19′25″E
- Country: Kazakhstan
- Region: Almaty Region
- District: Ile District

Population (2009)
  - Total: 5,646
- Time zone: UTC+6 (Omsk Time)
- Postal code: 040701
- Area code: 72757

Aqshi (Kazakh: Ақши, Aqşi) is a village in Almaty Region of south-eastern Kazakhstan.
