= Civic Party of Kazakhstan =

Civic Party of Kazakhstan Қазақстан азаматтық партиясы
- Abbreviation: QAP
- First Secretary: Azat Peruashev
- Parliamentary Leader: Rahmet Mukashev
- Founded: 17 November 1998; 27 years ago
- Dissolved: 10 November 2006; 19 years ago
- Merged into: Otan
- Headquarters: Almaty
- Membership (2003): 105,303
- Ideology: Constitutionalism; Liberal conservatism
- National affiliation: AIST (2004–2006)

The Civic Party of Kazakhstan (Kazakh: Қазақстан азаматтық партиясы, romanized: Qazaqstan Azamattyq Partııasy; Russian: Гражданская партия Казахстана) is a defunct political party in Kazakhstan that was led by First Secretary Azat Peruashev. The party was formed in 1998 and existed until 2006 when it was merged with Otan.

== History ==
The founding congress of the Civic Party of Kazakhstan was held on 17 November 1998 in the city of Aktobe. The party's program and charter were adopted at the congress and Azat Peruashev was elected as the party's First Secretary. On 29 December 1998, it was registered by the Ministry of Justice. The QAP advocated the construction of a democratic rule of law, the formation of civil society institutions, the strengthening and development of statehood. Most of the members of the party consisted of workers and employees of the largest enterprises of the mining and metallurgical industries. The main organ of the party was the Central Committee. The party had branches in all regions of the country, as well as in Astana and Almaty.

The Civic Party won one seat in the 1999 legislative elections from a single-member constituency and 2 from the party list.

On 7 December 2002, the President of Kazakhstan, Nursultan Nazarbayev, took part in a congress of the Civil Party of Kazakhstan, held in Pavlodar. The President met with the congress delegates and delivered a brief address.

The party participated in the Agrarian-Industrial Union of Workers (AIST) bloc alongside the Agrarian Party of Kazakhstan that won 7.1% of the popular vote and 11 out of 77 seats in the 2004 Kazakh legislative election. The elections were held on 19 September and 3 October.

On 23 September 2005, VI Party Congress was held in Pavlodar with the participation of President Nursultan Nazarbayev. At the congress, the party declared its support for Nazarbayev’s candidacy in the 2005 presidential election.

The Civic Party held a party congress on 10 November 2006. First Secretary Peruashev and President Nursultan Nazarbayev both attended. Peruashev announced that the Civic Party of Kazakhstan officially merged into Otan, the largest political party in Kazakhstan and the party of Nazarbayev, justifying the move by saying that "the interests of the nation" must take precedence. Nazarbayev said he expected other parties to merge with Otan. Nazarbayev said there should be fewer, stronger parties that "efficiently defend the interests of the population."
