= Adal (political party) =

Political party in Kazakhstan

Adal Адал
- Chairman: Serik Sultangali
- Founded: 26 April 2013 (as Birlik); 5 November 2020 (as Adal)
- Dissolved: 26 April 2022
- Merger of: Rukhaniyat Party; Democratic Party Adilet
- Merged into: Amanat
- Membership (2021): 300,000
- Ideology: Social market economy Environmentalism
- Political position: Centre-right

Website
- adalpartiyasy.kz

Adal (Kazakh: Адал, lit. 'Faithful'; stylised as ADAL), previously known as Birlik (Kazakh: Бірлік, lit. 'Unity') until 2020, was a centre-right political party in Kazakhstan that was formed as a result of merger between Rukhaniyat Party and Democratic Party Adilet on 26 April 2013. The party is led by Serik Sultangali, a Kazakh businessman and has a membership of over 300,000 people as of 2021. Since its creation, the Adal has participated in every parliamentary election, often taking last place in terms of vote share and has not never nominated a presidential candidate for the elections. On 26 April 2022, Adal merged with the Amanat party.

The party positioned itself as a pro-government by maintaining its support for continued nationwide reforms and called for large-scale modernisation of all spheres of society based on the principles of justice for people, accountability of government and competitiveness of business.

== History ==
On 26 April 2013, the two parties Adilet and Rukhaniyat made a decision to merge with each other to form Birlik (meaning Unity).

At the 2nd Birlik Extraordinary Congress held on 5 February 2016, the party announced its intention to run for the 2016 legislative elections and from there, approved an eight-point electoral programme under the slogan: "Clean intentions, clean actions, clean environment." At the elections, the Birlik won 0.29% of the vote, failing to reach the 7% electoral threshold, thus unable to win any seats in the Mazhilis.

The party never nominated its candidate for the 2015 or 2019 presidential elections.

It was revealed that the party in March 2020 proposed to merge with the Auyl People's Democratic Patriotic Party in which was rejected on 9 September 2020, according due to Birlik's low political activity and its platforms of which weren't changed in years. In response to the refusal, chairman Serik Sultangali stated that the party would continue functioning independently, noting that a new congress of Birlik would be held in near future that would amend the party's platforms, change the organisational structure with the political executive committee of the party, and would include new members. At the 5th Extraordinary Congress held on 30 September, the party amended its charter which granted more powers to the chairman in an attempt to ensure "faster decision-making". It also allowed for the Birlik political council to elect an executive secretary, in case of the termination of party leader's powers, to ensure the inter party election of a new chairman.

On 5 November 2020, at the political council of Birlik, the party announced its decision rename itself into Adal (meaning Honesty) due to an experiment carried out by sociologists in which the variant "Adal" was preferred more. The party was re-registered by the Ministry of Justice on 11 November. Shortly after Adal's rebranding, party chairman Serik Sultangali reported that more than 5,000 persons have joined the party's rank. At the 19th Adal Ordinary Congress, the party unveiled its electoral programme for the 2021 legislative elections of which were: a dignified life for all citizens, entrepreneurship is the basis of a successful state, development of the agro-industrial complex and food security, strong regions–a strong country, and a state for people. The Adal unveiled its list of proposed 20 MP's at a party list which included businesspeople, public figures, ecologists and statesmen. Due to the party's high activity on social media during the campaign, some viewed that the Adal might take second place in terms of vote share in the elections in spite of having of being having low ratings according to Kazakh state-sponsored polls. In result of the January 2021 Mazhilis elections, the Adal nevertheless took last place amongst other parties although it did slightly improve in terms of voter percentage share. According to the party member Oljas Ordabaev, the Adal would continue working systematically with the äkımats (local executive branches) and other organisations, claiming that the party would plan to come back "fully armed" in a next legislative election. During that period, it was revealed that membership of the party increased from 53,000 to more than 311,000 people.

On 26 April 2022, it merged with the Amanat party, thereby ceasing to exist.

== Ideology ==
In a Forbes interview, party chairman Serik Sultangali proclaimed the Adal as a centre-right party that positions itself for "a large-scale modernisation of all spheres of society on the principles of justice for people, accountability of power and competitiveness of business" that with its platforms would seek to compete with the Auyl and Aq Jol parties.

Although the party had no clear and formulated ideology in its early years, it ran on a platform that was focused on the environment and social sphere during the 2016 legislative elections. It positioned itself as a social justice party whose policy is aimed at protecting people from arbitrariness, creating equal starting opportunities for all Kazakhstanis, regardless of their social, national and religious background and expressed support of a social market economy and President Nursultan Nazarbayev's proposed five institutional reforms.

During the 2016 Aktobe shootings, the Adal condemned the incident that occurred within the city, calling it "an extreme manifestation of cynicism and cruelty" that is not connected towards "pious religious beliefs of believers" in regards to Islamic fundamentalism.

At the 19th Adal Ordinary Congress, the party revealed its electoral platforms which aimed at raising the Kazakh minimum wage to livable standards while at the same time easing government regulations for businesses by introducing moratorium on tax increases until 2025 and ending mandatory pension contributions and payments for micro and small businesses. The Adal also called for the development of local government as well as rural areas, improvements in environment and expressed its support to provide universal health care and free education for all citizens.

== Electorate ==
Based on the party's ideology and electoral platforms, it has often been compared with its rivaling Aq Jol party, in contrast being that the Adal is viewed to be more supportive towards the interests of small and medium sized businesses amongst entrepreneurs and that the party's support base would be reliant on towards urban middle-class citizens such as office workers, self-employees, officials, and skilled workers. Adal has also been seen to attract rural voters by including several agricultural businesspersons in the party's political council.

== Electoral history ==
=== Presidential elections ===
Election	Candidate	Votes	%	Votes	%	Result
Election	Candidate	First round		Second round		Result
2015	Endorsed Nursultan Nazarbayev	8,833,250	97.8	—		Won

=== Mäjilis elections ===
Election	Party leader	Votes	%	Seats	+/–	Position	Government
2016	Serik Sultangali	21,484	0.29%	0 / 98	Steady	New party	Extra-parliamentary
2021	Serik Sultangali	258,618	3.57%	0 / 98	Steady	▲5th	Extra-parliamentary
