= Azat Peruaşev =

Kazakh politician (born 1967)

- Азат Перуашев
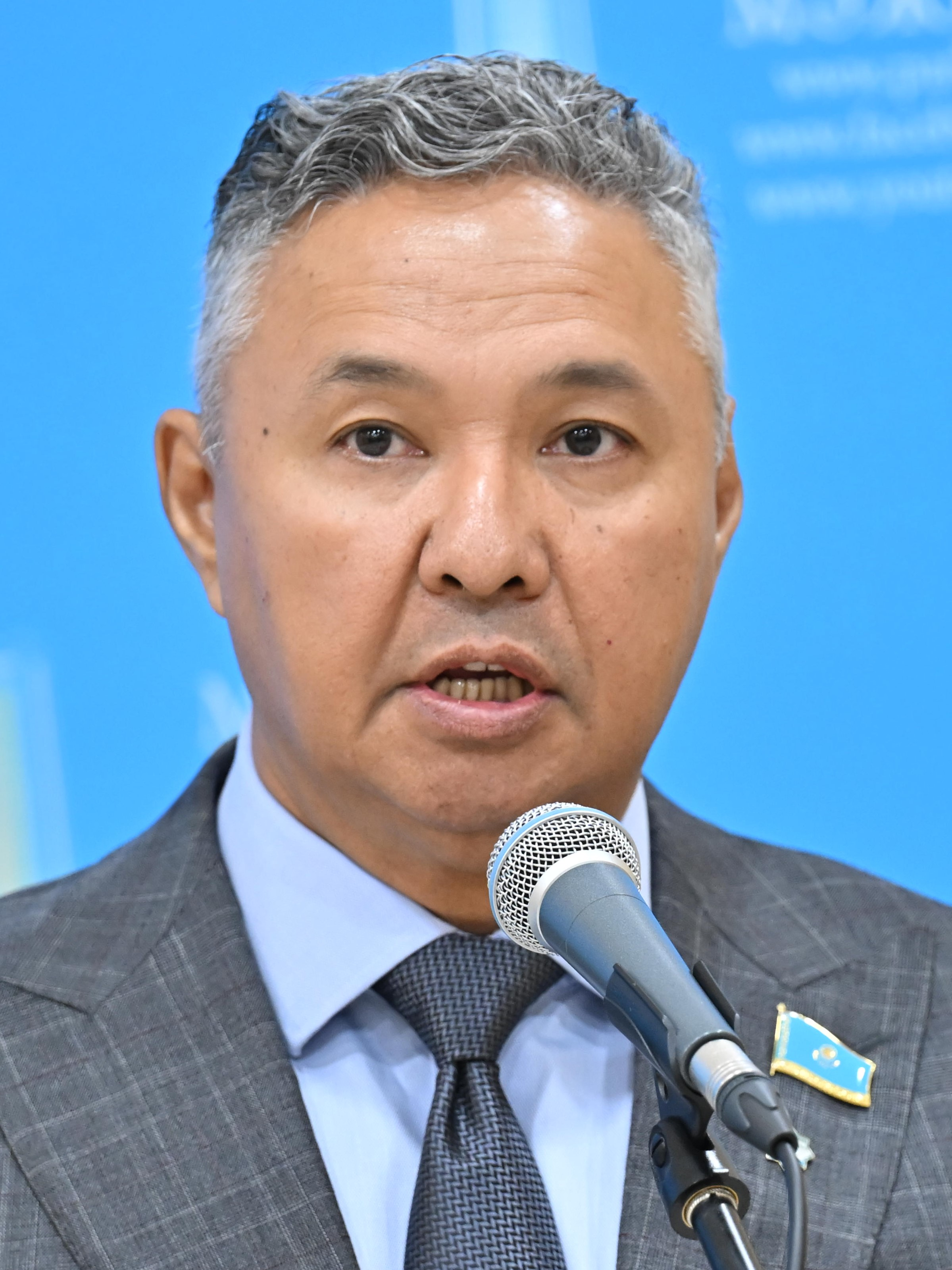
- Peruaşev in 2023

Member of the Mäjilis
- In office 15 January 2012 – 1 July 2026

Chairman of Aq Jol
- In office 2 July 2011 – 13 June 2026
- Preceded by: Alikhan Baimenov
- Succeeded by: Dania Espaeva

First Secretary of Civic Party
- In office 17 November 1998 – 10 November 2006
- Preceded by: Position established
- Succeeded by: Position abolished

Personal details
- Born: 8 September 1967 (age 59) Rgaity, Kazakh SSR, Soviet Union (now Nogaibai, Kazakhstan)
- Party: Aq Jol (2011–present)
- Other political affiliations: Civic Party (1998–2006); Nur Otan (2006–2011)
- Education: Ural State University

Azat Tūrlybekūly Peruaşev (Note: Often transliterated as Azat Turlybekovich Peruashev through a Russified Romanization of Азат Турлыбекович Перуашев.) (Kazakh: Азат Тұрлыбекұлы Перуашев; born 8 September 1967) is a Kazakh politician who is serving as a member of the Mäjilis since 2012. He is currently the chairman of the Aq Jol party since 2011. From 1998 to 2006, Peruaşev was the First Secretary of the Civic Party before its merger with Otan in 2006.

== Biography ==
=== Early life and education ===
Peruaşev was born to a Muslim family in the village of Rgaity, Korday District. From 1986 to 1988, he served in the Soviet Army. In 1991, Peruaşev graduated from the Ural State University, specializing in political science. In 1996, he completed the Academy of Public Administration under the President of the Republic of Kazakhstan with a degree in Public Administration Manager. In 2000, Peruaşev graduated from the Jetisu Economic Institute with a degree in economics-manager.

=== Early career ===
In 1991, he became an instructor at the Panfilov District Committee of the Communist Party of Kazakhstan. From 1992, Peruaşev served as a consultant and the head of the sector of the Taldykorgan Regional Administration. In 1996, he became a consultant and the head of the sector of the Presidential Administration of Kazakhstan. From 1998, Peruaşev was the Deputy General Director of JSC Aluminum of Kazakhstan.

From 1998 to 2006, Peruaşev served as the First Secretary of the Central Committee of the Civic Party of Kazakhstan. Between 2006 and 2011, he served as the chairman of the National Economic Chamber of Kazakhstan (The Atameken Union).

=== Political career ===
Since 2011, Peruaşev has been the chairman of the Ak Zhol Democratic Party. He became a member of the Mazhilis in the 2012 Kazakh legislative election.

== State honours ==
- Order of Friendship (2001)
- 'Barys' Award, 3rd degree (2008)
