= Ashat Oralov =

Kazakh politician (born 1990)

Askhat Oralov
- Асхат Оралов
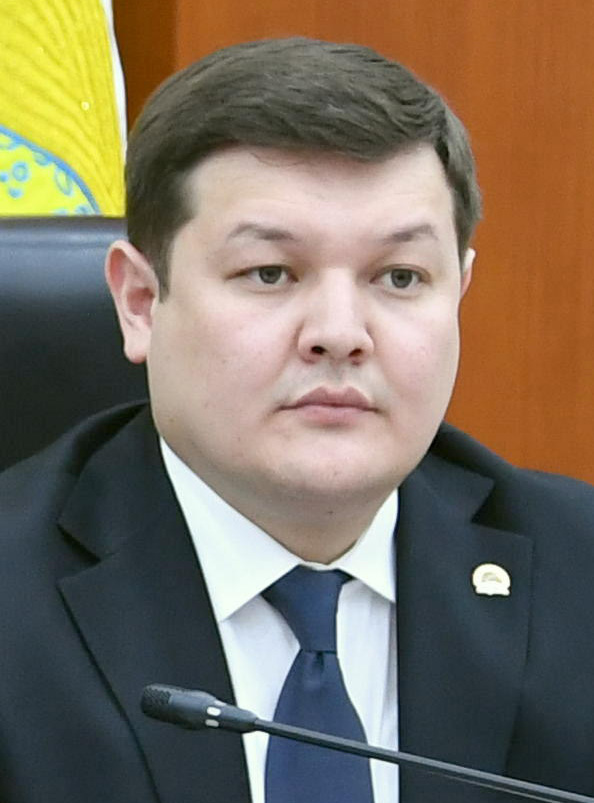
- Oralov in 2022

Minister of Culture and Sports
- In office 4 January 2023 – 1 September 2023
- President: Kassym-Jomart Tokayev
- Preceded by: Dauren Abaev
- Succeeded by: Office abolished, Ermek Marjyqpaev as Minister of Tourism and Sport

Executive Secretary of Amanat
- In office 2 February 2022 – 4 January 2023
- Chairman: Kassym-Jomart Tokayev; Erlan Qoşanov
- Preceded by: Office established

Member of the Astana City Mäslihat
- In office 20 March 2016 – 29 December 2016
- Preceded by: Saifudin Hamhoev
- Succeeded by: Qaiyrly Täuken
- Constituency: No. 20

Personal details
- Born: 10 February 1990 (age 36) Aksu, Kazakh SSR, Soviet Union (Now, Kazakhstan)
- Party: Amanat
- Education: L. N. Gumilyov Eurasian National University; Moscow State Institute of International Relations

Askhat Razdykovich Oralov (Kazakh: Асхат Раздықұлы Оралов, romanized: Ashat Razdyqūly Oralov, Kazakh pronunciation: [ɑsχɑt ɾɑzdɯqo̙ɫɯ ɔɾɑɫəf]; born 10 February 1990) is a Kazakh politician serving as the Executive Secretary of the Amanat party since 2 February 2022 to 4 January 2023.

Oralov served in various governments posts within and under ministries and has worked with the Amanat in leading positions in its branches in the capital Astana. He also served as a deputy äkım of Pavlodar Region and Nur-Sultan and was its city councillor. From January to September 2023, he was the Minister of Culture and Sports.

== Biography ==
=== Early life and education ===
Oralov was born in the city of Aksu in Pavlodar Region. He attended the universities of Moscow State Institute of International Relations and L. N. Gumilyov Eurasian National University in Astana where he earned his master's degree and PhD in international relations.

=== Career ===
Oralov began his career in leading positions of the secretariat in the Nur Otan youth wing Jas Otan in February 2010 until April 2014. While serving the post, from December 2011 to September 2012 he worked as a chief specialist of the Department of Social and Educational Work in the L. N. Gumilyov Eurasian National University, before eventually becoming senior specialists of the Department of Organizational Work there.

In May 2014, Oralov became First Deputy Chairman of the Nur branch under Nur Otan party in Astana until December 2016, where from there, he headed the Department for Youth Policy in the city. During that period, Oralov was elected as a youngest member from the 20th electoral district to the Astana City Mäslihat of the 5th convocation in March 2016, telling in an interview to Radio Free Europe/Radio Liberty: "My nomination to the mäslihat for me is actually a huge responsibility, a huge trust of our voters, the metropolitan leadership of the party's branch. For five years, I will try to justify these hopes." From there, he pledged to support youth initiatives and youth entrepreneurship, by setting "the gloss of the capital's youth".

On 3 January 2018, Oralov was appointed as the director of the Department of Youth Policy under the Ministry of Religious Affairs and Civil Society. He worked in the post before transferring to Pavlodar Region to serve as a deputy äkım for the region's social issues on 12 April 2019. On 13 July 2020, he returned to work in the central government as the Vice Minister of Information and Social Development. Oralov served the post for nearly a year before being appointed as the deputy äkım of Nur-Sultan on 12 July 2021, where he oversaw social areas. On January 4, 2023, was appointed Minister of Culture and Sports.

== Executive Secretary of Amanat (2022–2023) ==
On 2 February 2022, under party leader Kassym-Jomart Tokayev's decision, Oralov became the first Executive Secretary of Amanat, a new position formed after the post of First Deputy Chairman was disbanded. This came shortly after Tokayev headed the party and called for the post to be abolished and be replaced with Executive Secretary, resulting in previous officeholder Bauyrjan Baibek, a close circle of former President Nursultan Nazarbayev being dismissed.

== Honours ==
- Certificate of Merit of the President of the Republic of Kazakhstan (14 December 2018)
- Qazaqstan Konstitutsiasyna 25 jyl Anniversary Medal
