= Qaraqat Äbden =

Kazakh politician, economist and writer

MP Qaraqat Äbden
- Қарақат Әбден
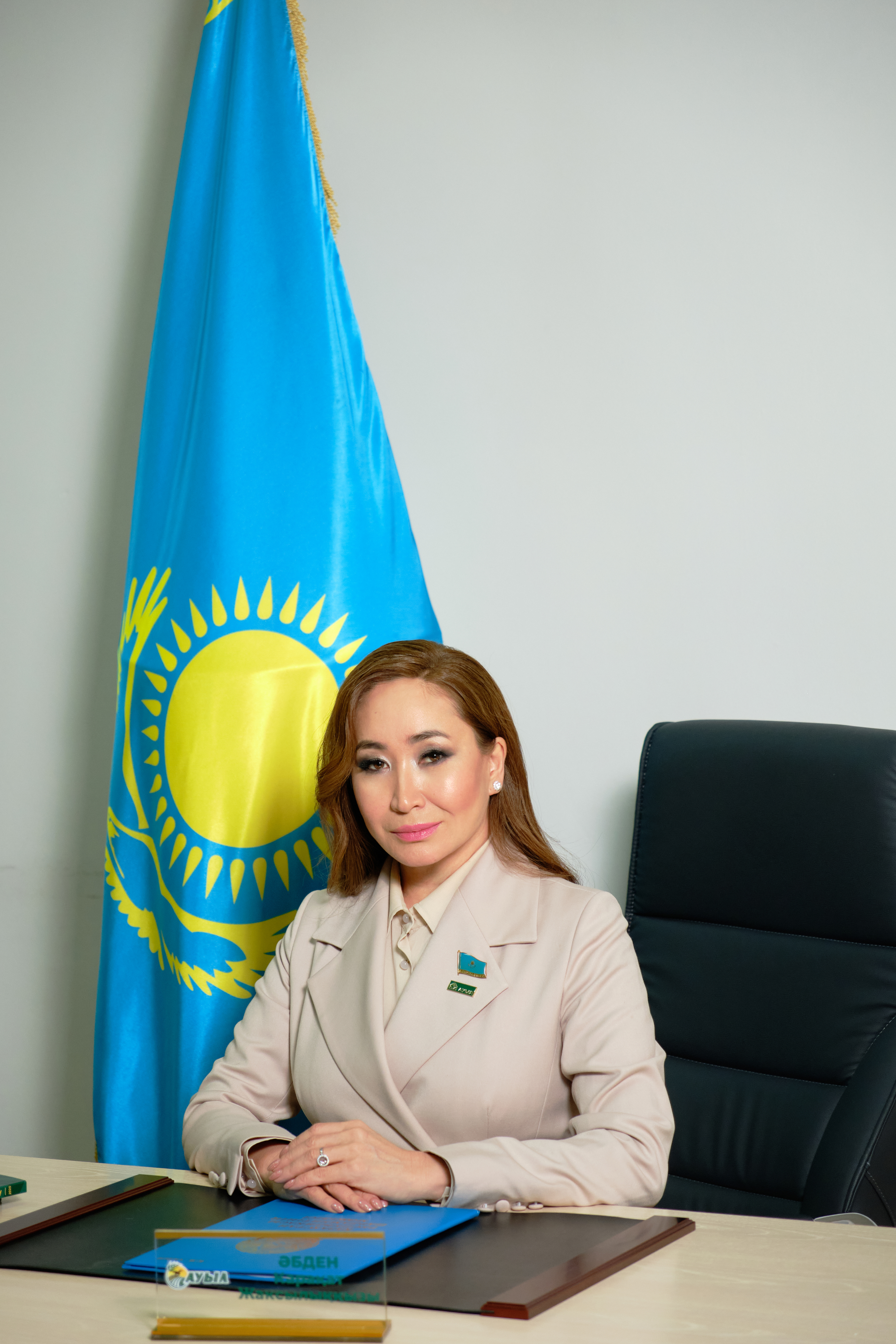
- Äbden in 2023

Member of the Mäjilis
- In office 29 March 2023 – 1 July 2026
- Constituency: Auyl List

Member of the Nur-Sultan City Mäslihat
- In office 20 March 2016 – 24 December 2020
- Preceded by: Qairat Jauhanov
- Succeeded by: Constituency abolished
- Constituency: No. 19

Personal details
- Born: 7 May 1974 (age 52) Korgalzhyn District, Tselinograd Region, Kazakh SSR, Soviet Union
- Party: Auyl (since 2023)
- Other political affiliations: KÄQŪA (2022); Amanat (until 2023)
- Children: 5
- Education: Almaty Institute of National Economy
- Occupation: Politician, economist, writer

Qaraqat Jaqsylyqqyzy Äbden (Kazakh: Қарақат Жақсылыққызы Әбден, [qɑɾɑqɑt ʐɑqsəɫɯqqɯzɯ æbdʲen]; born 7 May 1974) is a Kazakh politician, economist, and writer who has been serving as a member of the Mäjilis since 2023. She previously served on the Astana City Mäslihat from 2016 to 2021.

Äbden began her career as an economist in private commercial firms before transitioning to public service, where she worked on tax-related issues under various Kazakh government ministries. A member of the ruling Nur Otan party for much of her career, she held multiple positions within its structure and is currently serving as a freelance adviser to the Äkim of Astana on social issues.

In 2022, Äbden was nominated as a presidential candidate by the National Alliance of Professional Social Workers, finishing third place with 2.6% of the vote in the race. The following year, she won a party-list seat in the Mäjilis during the 2023 legislative election, running under the Auyl party.

Äbden is also the chairwoman of the Qazaq Qyzy Public Association and the "Asyl Böbek" Association of Private Preschool Organisations, as well as the director of several nurseries in Astana. She is the author of the book You Are a Kazakh Girl. Be Proud!.

== Biography ==
=== Early life and education ===
Äbden was born in 1974 in the village of 22 Partsyezda, Akmola Region, to parents Jaqsylyq Äbdenov and Rysbala Şalabaeva. Her father, Äbdenov, worked as a construction worker, while her mother, Şalabaeva, was a teacher. As a child, she attended Secondary School No. 10 in the village of Jäirem, Ulytau Region, where she graduated with a gold medal. Afterward, she enrolled in the Almaty Institute of National Economy, where she earned a degree in marketing and commerce. She later became a Candidate of Economic Sciences after defending her thesis on the topic Formation of Revenues of Local Budgets Using Non-Production Payments.

=== Career ===
Äbden began her career as an economist at the Orda private commercial firm in Almaty. She then served as a leading specialist in the Department of Large Taxpayers under the Ministry of State Revenues of Kazakhstan. Over the course of a decade, starting in 1999, Äbden worked in the Ministry of Finance, where she held various positions, including acting head of several tax committees. These roles included serving as the head of the Department of Taxpayer Monitoring, chief specialist of the Tax Appeals Department, head of the Department for Work with Taxpayers at the Interregional Tax Committee No. 1, head of the Department of Non-production Payments, and chief expert at the Control Department No. 4 of the Financial Control Committee.

In 2009, she became the deputy director of the National School of Public Policy at the Academy of Public Administration under the President of Kazakhstan. She also worked within the Nur Otan party, heading the Sector of Analytics and Coordination at the Nur Otan's Higher Party School and serving as a consultant to the Innovation Committee at the Nur Otan's central office in Astana. In 2013, Äbden founded the Qazaq Qyzy public association, Kazakhstan's first women's institute of cultural and moral education, as well as the "Asyl Böbek" Association of Private Preschool Organisations in Astana.

On the eve of International Women's Day in March 2016, Äbden was among the women attending the traditional Köktem Şuağy ("Spring Sunshine") meeting, which was attended by President Nursultan Nazarbayev.

On 20 Match 2016, Äbden was elected as a Nur Otan deputy for the sixth convocation of the Nur-Sultan City Mäslihat, representing the 19th electoral district which was previously held by Qairat Jauhanov. From there, she served as member of the Commission on Issues of Sociocultural Development.

=== 2022 presidential election ===
On 7 October 2022, Äbden was nominated by the National Alliance of Professional Social Workers as a candidate for the 2022 presidential election. Her campaign focused on improving the quality of life for Kazakhstanis, advocating for a decent standard of living for families, and emphasizing that "the main wealth of the state is its people." She positioned herself as "socially oriented," with a platform aimed at strengthening support for families, children, youth, and the elderly. Her proposals included enhancing cultural values, improving education and healthcare, and bolstering social protection as pillars of societal development.

== Controversies ==
=== You are a Kazakh Girl. Be proud! ===
In December 2019, Äbden published her book You are Kazakh Girl. Be Proud! (Сен қазақтың қызысың. Мақтан ет!), which explores the role of a modern Kazakh woman in Kazakhstani society. The book emphasizes the importance of observing traditional values while offering criticism of feminism. Upon its limited release, the publication generated significant public controversy. A large portion of the copies were donated to libraries in rural schools and orphanages, but the book faced criticism for allegedly promoting nationalist and sexist values.

Moreover, questions were raised about the use of state funding for Äbden’s Qazaq Qyzy public association, particularly regarding the allocation of over 17.5 million tenge to fund the book's distribution. Critics accused her of using taxpayers’ money for personal purposes. In response to the backlash, Äbden defended herself, claiming that many of the criticisms were taken out of context. She also stated that she was, in fact, supportive of feminism, despite the critiques leveled against her views.

=== Holiday ban proposals ===
During her 2022 presidential campaign, Äbden proposed a ban on holidays such as Halloween and Valentine's Day in Kazakhstan, citing concerns over the holiday's practices and their potential harm to Kazakh culture and values. Specifically, she criticized the use of face masks, costumes, and the commercialization of Halloween, arguing that these elements conflicted with traditional Kazakh values and could erode the country's cultural identity. Äbden believed these practices, which she saw as imported from the West, negatively influenced the younger generation and led to a disconnect from Kazakhstan's traditions.

This proposal came after the tragic Seoul Halloween crowd crush in 2022, which further fueled her concerns about the safety risks associated with such celebrations. Following the incident, Äbden called for legal action to ban holidays like Halloween that she felt "poisoned" young people's minds. She urged the youth to instead celebrate Kazakhstan’s national holidays, which she viewed as offering a more authentic and culturally meaningful connection to the nation's heritage.

=== Transnational marriage tax ===
Äbden's faced significant controversy due to her proposal to impose a large tax on Kazakhstani women who marry foreigners. As a candidate in the 2022 presidential election, she initially put forward this suggestion during her campaign, which she later reiterated on 5 April 2023 during her tenure as a deputy in the Mäjilis. Her proposal sparked widespread criticism, including accusations of ethnic discrimination. In response, law enforcement official Dina Tanshari called for the termination of Äbden’s deputy mandate, claiming that the proposal discriminated against Kazakhstan's ethnic minorities.

Anas Bakkozhayev, head of the parliamentary faction of Auyl, responded to Tanshari’s petition, acknowledging her right to voice concerns and expressing openness to meeting and addressing any questions she had. He emphasized that not all members of the Auyl parliamentary group supported Äbden's controversial proposal. Äbden herself clarified that the proposal had been misunderstood and was no longer under discussion, noting that she had addressed the matter thoroughly on social media.
