= 2021 Nur-Sultan City Mäslihat election =

2021 Election in Kazakhstan's capital city

- 10 January 2021
- All 31 seats in the Nur-Sultan City Mäslihat; 16 seats needed for a majority
- Turnout: 44.86%
| Party | Leader | Vote % | Seats | +/– |
|---|---|---|---|---|
| Nur Otan | Altai Kólginov | 83.61% | 26 | New |
| Ak Zhol | Asqar Smagulov | 7.44% | 3 | New |
| People's Party | Nurdaulet Orazhanov | 7.41% | 2 | New |
This lists parties that won seats. See the complete results below.
| Secretary before |
|---|
| Janat Nurpeiisov |

Elections to the Nur-Sultan City Mäslihat were held on 10 January 2021 to elect 31 councillors of the Nur-Sultan City Mäslihat. This is the first time that the MP's would be chosen by party-list proportional representation.

The Nur Otan won a majority of 26 out of 31 seats in the City Mäslihat.

== Background ==
Following the 2016 City Mäslihat elections, all the contested seats in the Mäslihat was won by Nur Otan members. Despite the race being non-partisan, many independent candidates complained about being barred from running due to alleged "inconsistency of the data in the tax returns".

After President Nursultan Nazarbayev announced constitutional reforms in 2017 which would give lawmakers more power and decentralize the government, an amendment was passed by the Parliament which would allow for local elections to the Mäslihats be more partisan, thus giving greater role for political parties to nominate its candidates. However this made practically impossible for self-nominated independent candidates to be compete in the elections since the law requires all Mäslihat councillors to be part of political parties.

== Electoral system ==
The City Mäslihat councillors are directly elected through proportional representation for a 5-year term and must win the 7% electoral threshold to win any seats. If only one party manages to pass the threshold, then the other party with the second most received votes is awarded enough seats to have representations in the City Mäslihat.

== Results ==
| Party | Votes | % | Seats | +/– |
|---|---|---|---|---|
| Nur Otan | 239,898 | 83.61 | 26 | +26 |
| Ak Zhol Democratic Party | 21,338 | 7.44 | 3 | +3 |
| People's Party | 21,251 | 7.41 | 2 | +2 |
| Auyl People's Democratic Patriotic Party | 2,814 | 0.98 | 0 | 0 |
| Adal | 1,619 | 0.56 | 0 | 0 |
| Total | 286,920 | 100.00 | 31 | 0 |
| Valid votes | 286,920 | 93.96 | | |
| Invalid/blank votes | 18,457 | 6.04 | | |
| Total votes | 305,377 | 100.00 | | |
| Registered voters/turnout | 680,705 | 44.86 | | |
Source: Vechastana.kz

Popular vote
| Nur Otan | 83.61% |
| Ak Zhol | 7.44% |
| QHP | 7.41% |
| Auyl | 0.98% |
| Adal | 0.56% |

City Mäslihat seats
| Nur Otan | 83.87% |
| Ak Zhol | 9.67% |
| QHP | 6.45% |
| Auyl | 0% |
| Adal | 0% |
