= Coat of arms of Astana =

- Armiger: Zhenis Kassymbek, Äkim of Astana
- Adopted: 18 November 2022
- Shield: Eastern
- Motto: «Astana»

The coat of arms of Astana, the capital of Kazakhstan, was originally adopted on 5 June 2008, and readopted on 18 November 2022, two months after the city's old name was restored by a constitutional amendment.

== Overview ==
The emblem features a shangyrak (шаңырақ, şañyraq), the upper dome-like portion of a yurt, a symbol seen throughout Kazakh history and culture. It also features on various other flags and symbols in Kazakhstan, in the blue and yellow colours that feature on the national flag. A similar emblem, known as the tunduk in Kyrgyz, is seen on the flag of Kyrgyzstan. Beneath this is a stylised depiction of the Baiterek, and a kuskanaty, a stylised bird.

It also has a red border with the name of the city written on the bottom of the coat of arms. As part of the language romanisation campaign undertaken by the Kazakh government since 2018, the emblem now (since 2022) features the city's name in Latin script (Astana) rather than Cyrillic script (Астана).

== History ==
The current emblem is based on the one adopted in 1998 along with the city flag, at the 16th session of the Astana City Mäslihat in 1998. In 2019 the city was renamed from Astana to Nur-Sultan. As the city name features on both the emblem and city flag, both insignia were updated to the new name in 2019.

Under the Russian Empire, the coat of arms featured a stylized castle on a turquoise shield. That design had several variations, with one featuring leaves, while the other featured ears of cereal. The crown also varied, with one version using a monarchical crown, while the other used a mural crown.

During Soviet era, the city was known as Tselinograd. It was primarily represented by a "full hands" design, which symbolized agriculture.

After the dissolution of the Soviet Union, the city was renamed from Teslinograd to Akmola and later to Astana. For the first few years after becoming the capital of an independent Kazakhstan, the city did not have an official coat of arms. Instead, it used an unofficial design featuring a medieval wall and ancient warlord superimposed on a blue shield.

The emblem the city used between 1998–2008 showed a mythical creature standing in front of a medieval fortification, flanked by ears of wheat.

The city was briefly renamed from Astana to Nur-Sultan in 2019 after the resignation of long-time former President of Kazakhstan Nursultan Nazarbayev. This meant that the flag and coat of arms were changed on 3 May 2019 to include the name Nur-Sultan in a Latin script. After the city's name changed back to Astana, the Astana City Mäslihat adopted the flag and coat of arms with "Astana" in a Latin script on 18 November 2022.

== Gallery ==
Coat of Arms of Akmolinsk

Coat of Arms of Tselinograd

Coat of Arms of Astana, used 1998–2008

Coat of Arms of Astana, used 2008–2019

Coat of Arms of Nur-Sultan, used 2019–2022
