= 21st Congress =

21st Congress may refer to:

- 21st Congress of the Communist Party of the Soviet Union (1959)
- 21st Nur Otan Extraordinary Congress (2022)
- 21st United States Congress (1829–1831)
