= Flag of Astana =

Astana
- Use: Small vexillological symbol or pictogram in black and white showing the different uses of the flag
- Adopted: 18 November 2022
- Designed by: Nursultan Nazarbayev

The flag of Astana, the capital of Kazakhstan, was designed by the first President of Kazakhstan, Nursultan Nazarbayev. The current version of the flag was adopted along with the coat of arms of Astana by the Astana City Mäslihat on 18 November 2022.

== History ==
From 1998 to 2008, Astana had a different flag: a blue cloth with the image of the old coat of arms, the ratio of the flag’s width to length was 1:2. On June 5, 2008, a new flag was chosen.

== Historical flags ==
Flag of Astana, used 1998–2008

Cyrillic Flag of Astana, used 2008–2019

Flag of Nur-Sultan, used 2019–2022
