= 21st Nur Otan Extraordinary Congress =

2022 Kazakh political party conference

21st Extraordinary Congress of the Nur Otan Party
- The flag of the Nur Oran party
- Date: 28 January 2022
- Location: Remote
- Participants: 389 delegates
- Outcome: Election of the Party Chairman, amendment of the Charter, and approval of the new Political Council.

The 21st Extraordinary Congress of the Nur Otan Party (Kazakh: «Нұр Отан» партиясының кезектен тыс XXI съезі, romanized: «Nūr Otan» partiiasynyñ kezekten tys XXI sezı; Russian: XXI внеочередной съезд партии «Нур Отан») was held remotely on 28 January 2022 to elect the new chairman of Nur Otan after former President Nursultan Nazarbayev announced in stepping down from leading the largest ruling party in Kazakhstan for more than 20 years in November 2021 and the days of turmoil conflict that took place in early January. The congress was attended by 389 delegates. For the first time since 1999, the Nur Otan unanimously elected incumbent President Kassym-Jomart Tokayev as its new party leader.

Amongst other discussed issues in the congress were the amendments and additions to the party's charter, amendments to the Composition of the Political Council. From there, Tokayev expressed the need for the Nur Otan to renew itself by calling for a drastic reconstruction of all the party's work.

== Background ==
On 23 November 2021, a political council meeting of Nur Otan was held from where Nursultan Nazarbayev, who continued serving as the party's leader since stepping down as president in 2019, announced his intention to resign from leading it according to Nazarbayev's press secretary Aidos Ükıbay, noting that Nazarbayev would continue in serving as chairman until a new congress would be held under the party's charter.

The 28 January date for the congress was announced by Bauyrjan Baibek on 19 January 2022 in his Twitter page, adding that it would be held remotely due to the spread of COVID-19 and restriction measures. Just days after, the Nur Otan faced a scandal within its ranks in Semey as 150 people had left the party's membership in which according to former local lawmaker Aidos Qisamenov, was in protest due to "distrust of the leadership" while Maira Qūrjikaeva, acting first deputy of the Nur Otan branch in the city of Semey, believed the move to be caused after the local lawmakers Rafail Hazipov and Bauyrjan Qairambaev were expelled from the party in result of the opposition towards East Kazakhstan Region äkım and former PM Daniyal Akhmetov

== Event ==
A total of 399 delegates were chosen for the 21st Extraordinary Congress, in which 389 of them took part in participating. The congress was held behind closed doors remotely and was attended by national leaders, members of the Nur Otan Political Council as well as its representatives of regional branches, legislators and members of the government.

=== Amendments to the Party Charter ===
During the congress, several revisions were made to the Nur Otan's party charter which were payment contributions as prior before was tied with 0.7% of the minimum wage or 3,570 tenge per year. After presidential decree which cancelled the binding of all state payments to the minimum wage, the party contributions were changed to 0.1% of the minimum wage monthly or 3,676 tenge per year.

=== Changes to Political Council ===
According to the Nur Otan, the party's political council had been revised by 55% with female representation rising to 33.7%, share of young people under 35 increasing six times to 13% and average age decreased by 4 years to 47 years old. The number of civil servants decreased by third while the educational sector representatives rose 10% and share of NGOs and media to 15.2%.

It was also noted that the Political Council which consists of 92 people did not include political figures such as Bauyrjan Baibek, Dariga Nazarbayeva, Askar Mamin, Erlan Karin, Bakhytzhan Sagintayev, Dauren Abaev, and Bulat Utemuratov. For the first time, neither a Prime Minister, cabinet official or an äkım were included in the composition.

=== Chairmanship election ===
January 2022 Nur Otan chairmanship election
- 28 January 2022
- Registered: 399 delegates
- Turnout: 97.49%
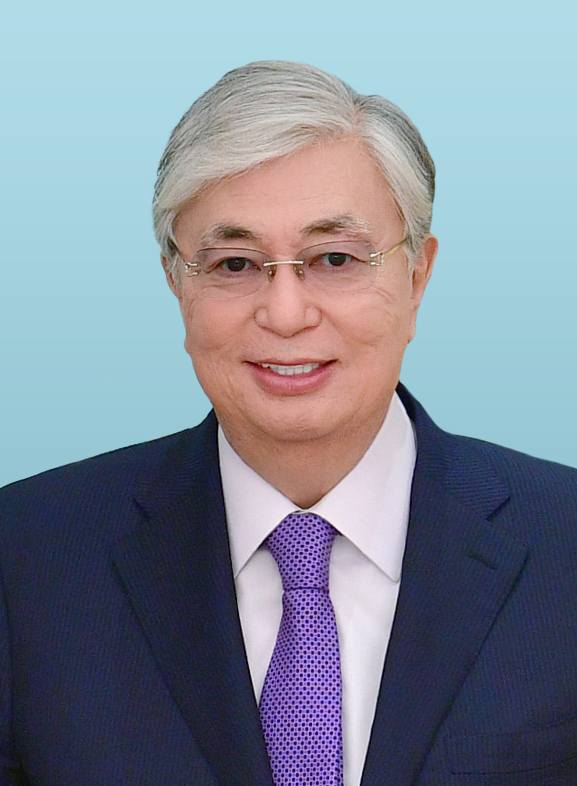
Candidate	Kassym-Jomart Tokayev
Party	Nur Otan
Delegate vote	389
Percentage	100.0%
Chairman before election
Nursultan Nazarbayev
Nur Otan
Elected Chairman
Kassym-Jomart Tokayev
Nur Otan

After party chairman Nursultan Nazarbayev announced his resignation from the post in November 2021, he endorsed his successor, President Kassym-Jomart Tokayev, to take over the chairmanship of Nur Otan. This decision was made to ensure that the party aligned with the incumbent president and effectively addressed the challenges posed by the global COVID-19 pandemic.

First Deputy Chairman Bauyrjan Baibek remarked decision as "a clear signal for everyone inside and outside the country about the monolith of power and a common commitment to the policy of continuity," remarking that Tokayev was one of the original founders for the party.

==== Candidates ====
- Kassym-Jomart Tokayev, President of Kazakhstan since 2019

==== Results ====
Candidate	Votes	Percentage
Kassym-Jomart Tokayev	389	100.0
Total	389	100.0
Number of delegates/turnout	399	97.5
Source: Nur Otan website
