= 1st Otan Founding Congress =

1999 Otan chairmanship election
1 March 1999	2022 →
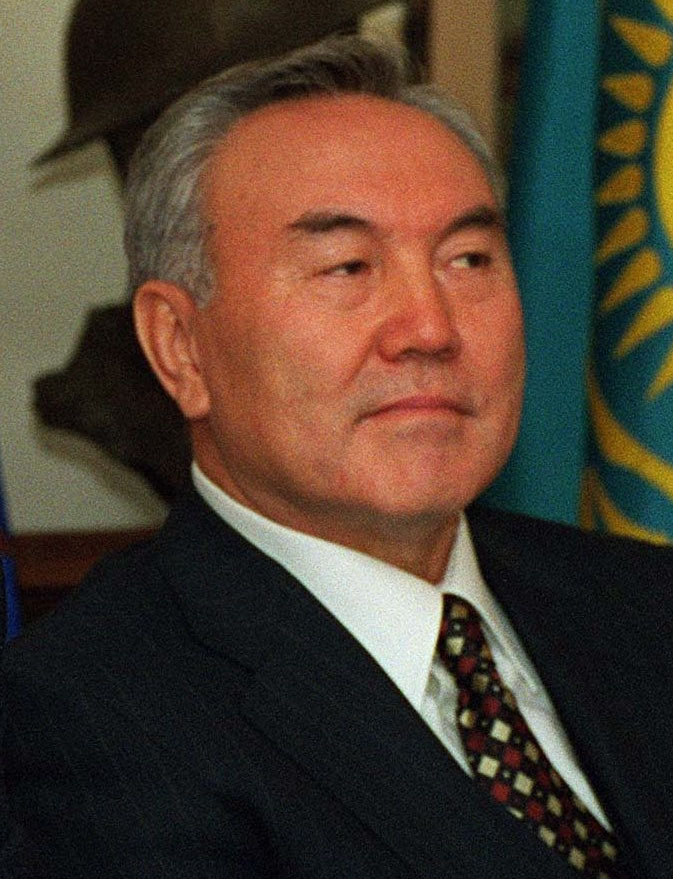
Candidate	Nursultan Nazarbayev
Party	Otan
Delegate vote	385
Percentage	100%
Elected Chairman
Nursultan Nazarbayev

The 1st Founding Congress of the "Otan" Republican Political Party (Kazakh: «Отан» Республикалық саяси партиясының I құрылтай съезі, romanized: «Otan» Respublikalyq saiasi partiiasynyñ I qūryltai sezı; Russian: I учредительный съезд Республиканской политической партии «Отан») in Kazakhstan was held on 1 March 1999. President Nursultan Nazarbayev was unanimously chosen to be the chairman by the 385 delegates.

== Background ==
On 21 October 1998, a public association in supporting Nursultan Nazarbayev's reelection campaign in the 1999 presidential election was created. On 19 January 1999, a meeting of the public association was held, at which it was decided to transform the organization into the Otan party. On 1 March 1999, the 1st Congress was held, which was attended by 385 delegates and 117 invited guests in Almaty. The delegates of the Congress chose Nazarbayev to be the chairman and adopted the composition of the audit commission and the party Charter.

== Aftermath ==
Nursultan Nazarbayev refused to accept the post as chairman due to constitutional limits on president's affiliation with political parties. He suggested that former Prime Minister Sergey Tereshchenko take over the role to which he remained until 2002. Nazarbayev nevertheless remained as a de facto Chairman and the party went on to participate in the 1999 legislative election.
