= Jastar Ruhy =

Youth organization of the Amanat party in Kazakhstan

Jastar Ruhy Жастар рухы
- Founded: 14 May 2008; 18 years ago (as Jas Otan); 12 July 2022 (as Jastar Ruhy)
- Headquarters: 010000, D. Kunayev str., 12/1, Astana
- Mother party: Ädilet (since 2026); Amanat (2022–2026); Nur Otan (2008–2022)
- Website: jastarruhy.kz

Jastar Ruhy (Kazakh: Жастар рухы [ʒɑsˈtɑr‿ruˈχɤ]; lit. 'Youth Spirit'), previously known as Jas Otan (Жас Отан [ʒɑs‿woˈtɑn]; lit. 'Young Fatherland') until 2022, is a youth wing of AMANAT, the ruling party of Kazakhstan. The youth organisation was originally formed at the 1st Jas Otan Congress in Astana on 14 May 2008.

The Jastar Ruhy encompasses its branches across all Kazakhstan's regions, including the cities of Astana, Almaty, and Shymkent, as well as branches in districts and cities. The Jastar Ruhy central council includes deputies from the lower chamber Mäjilis and mäslihats (local assemblies) of all levels, leaders of youth NGOs, young athletes and cultural figures. As of 2012, the number of youth organization's members is approximately more than 200,000.

In 2026, after the merger of Amanat into Ädilet, Jastar Ruhy moved under the Ädilet party.

== History ==
The Jastar Ruhy youth wing of the ruling AMANAT party initially acted without having its own separate legal body. On 25 November 2006, at a political council meeting of Otan, Bakhytzhan Zhumagulov in his report noted there had been no single meeting of the Jas Otan republican council within the time frame of 1.5 years, and its leaders had organized only one-time events which was not connected with others. The political council of Otan, central office, all branches and representatives was given a task to intensify work with young people and provide a program of action in this direction urgently.

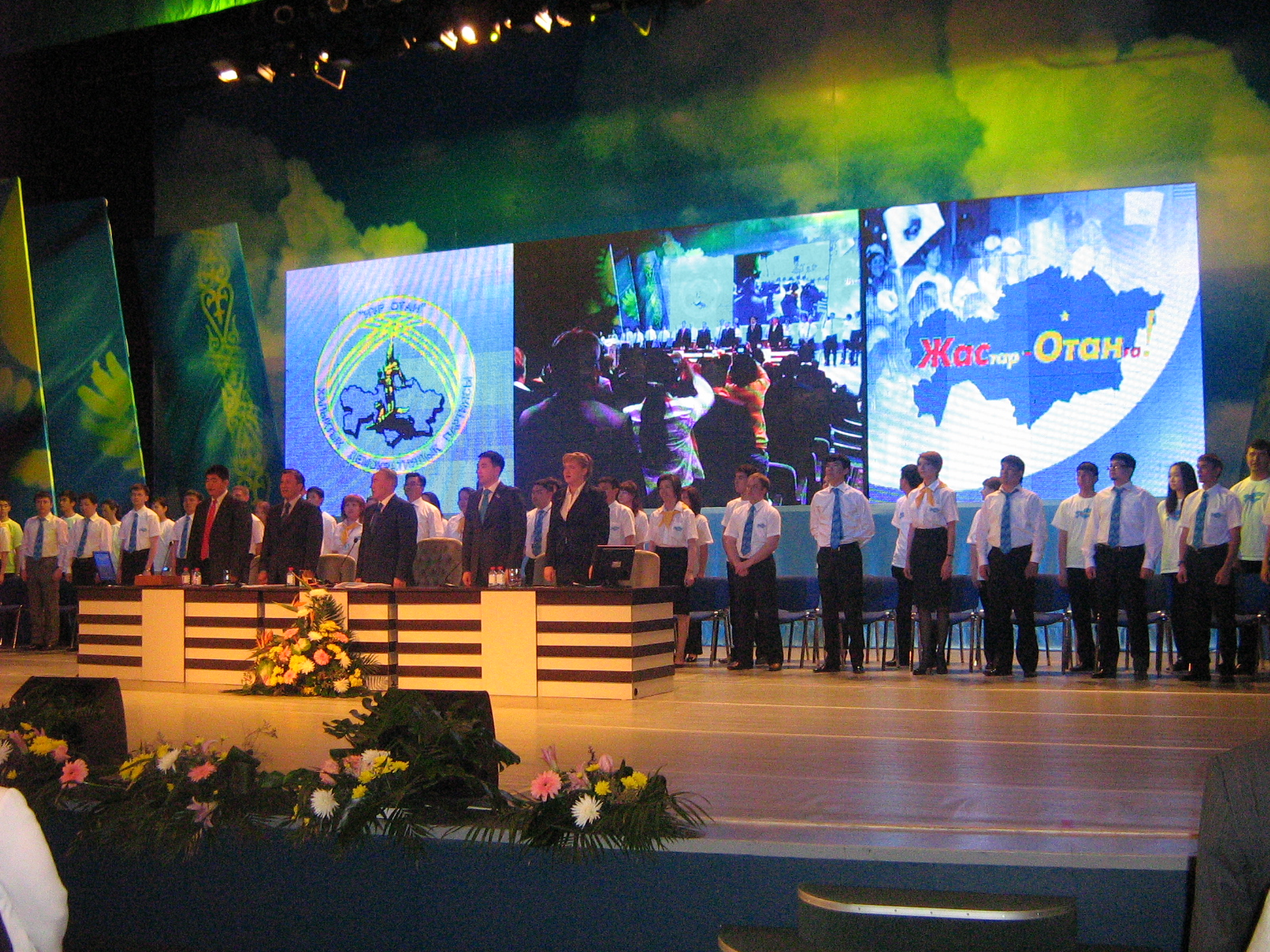
Performing anthem of Kazakhstan.

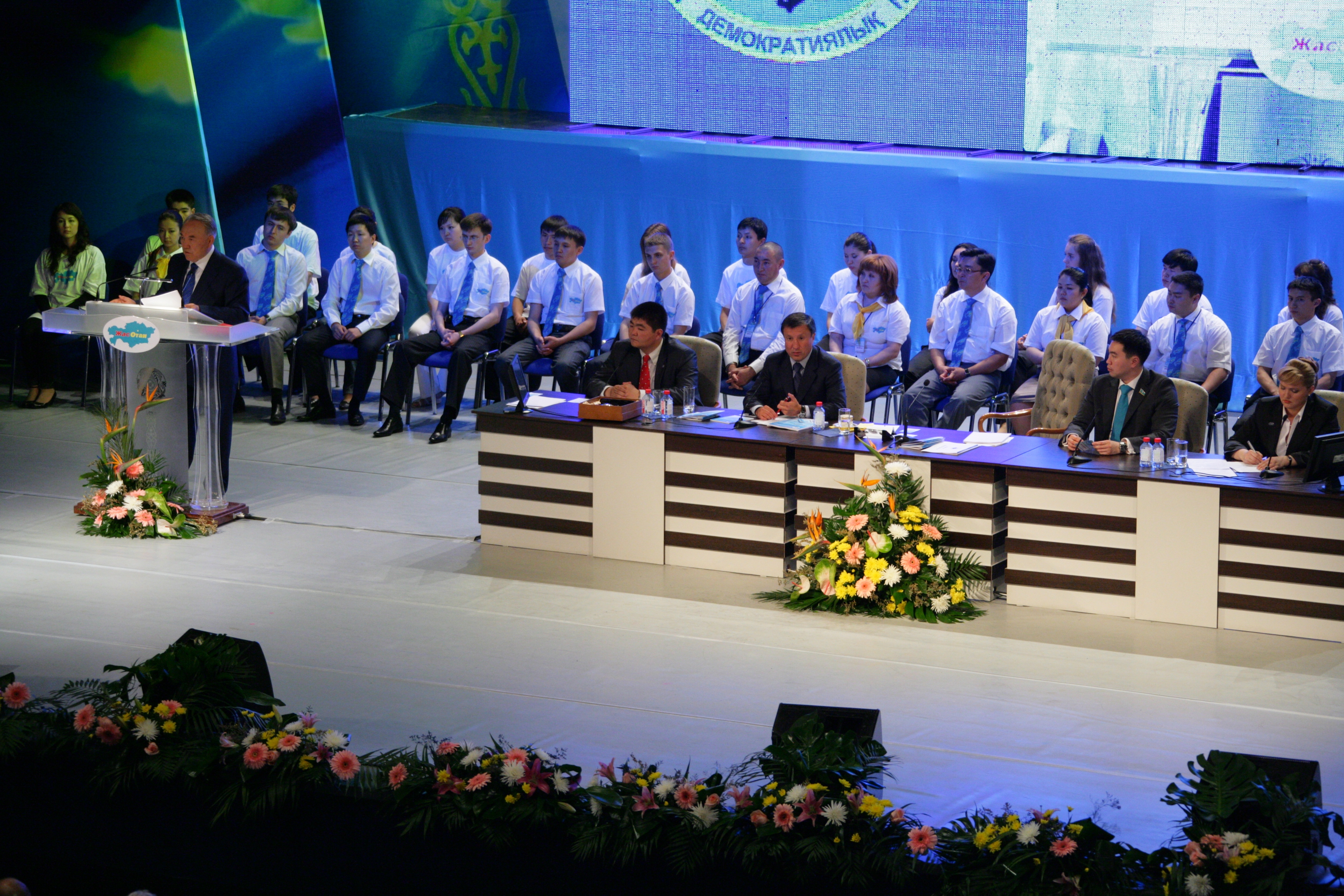
President Nursultan Nazarbayev giving a speech at the 1st Jas Otan Congress.

On 17 January 2008, at an enlarged meeting of political council of Nur Otan, party chairman Nursultan Nazarbayev proposed to hold congress of Jas Otan youth wing of Nur Otan People's Democratic Party in spring of a same year.

On 14 May 2008, the 1st Jas Otan Congress was held in Astana with participation of Nazarbayev. In a process of preparation to the 1st Congress, Nur Otan party initiated parliamentary hearings on the discussion of the Law on State Youth Policy in the Republic of Kazakhstan, youth conferences were organized in all regions of the country to approve a list of 310 delegates to the Congress.

The congress was also attended by leaders of youth organizations from Kazakhstan, members of the party and the Bureau of Political Council, heads of the Administration of President of Kazakhstan, and deputies of the Parliament, representatives of government, the Assembly of Peoples of Kazakhstan, mass-media, and young guests from foreign countries. The 1st Congress of Delegates adopted the statutes of a public association and action strategy for 2008–2011, the executive secretary of the organization was selected Nurlan Uteshev.

In his speech at the Congress, Nazarbayev assigned immediate tasks to the organization to create all necessary conditions under which every young citizen of Kazakhstan would be able to realize a potential, become self-sufficient and competitive personality, and also noted the role of established organization in the state youth policy:

Dear young ladies and gentlemen!

It is hard to solve all problems in sphere of youth only by state efforts. Many things depend on civil attitude and energy of youth associations themselves. You also mentioned that.

I am deeply ensured that Zhas Otan is able to take over a number of very important goals of national scale, to become one of main mechanisms of youth socialization, forming progressive attitudes and modern value to young generation.

1st Congress of Jas Otan

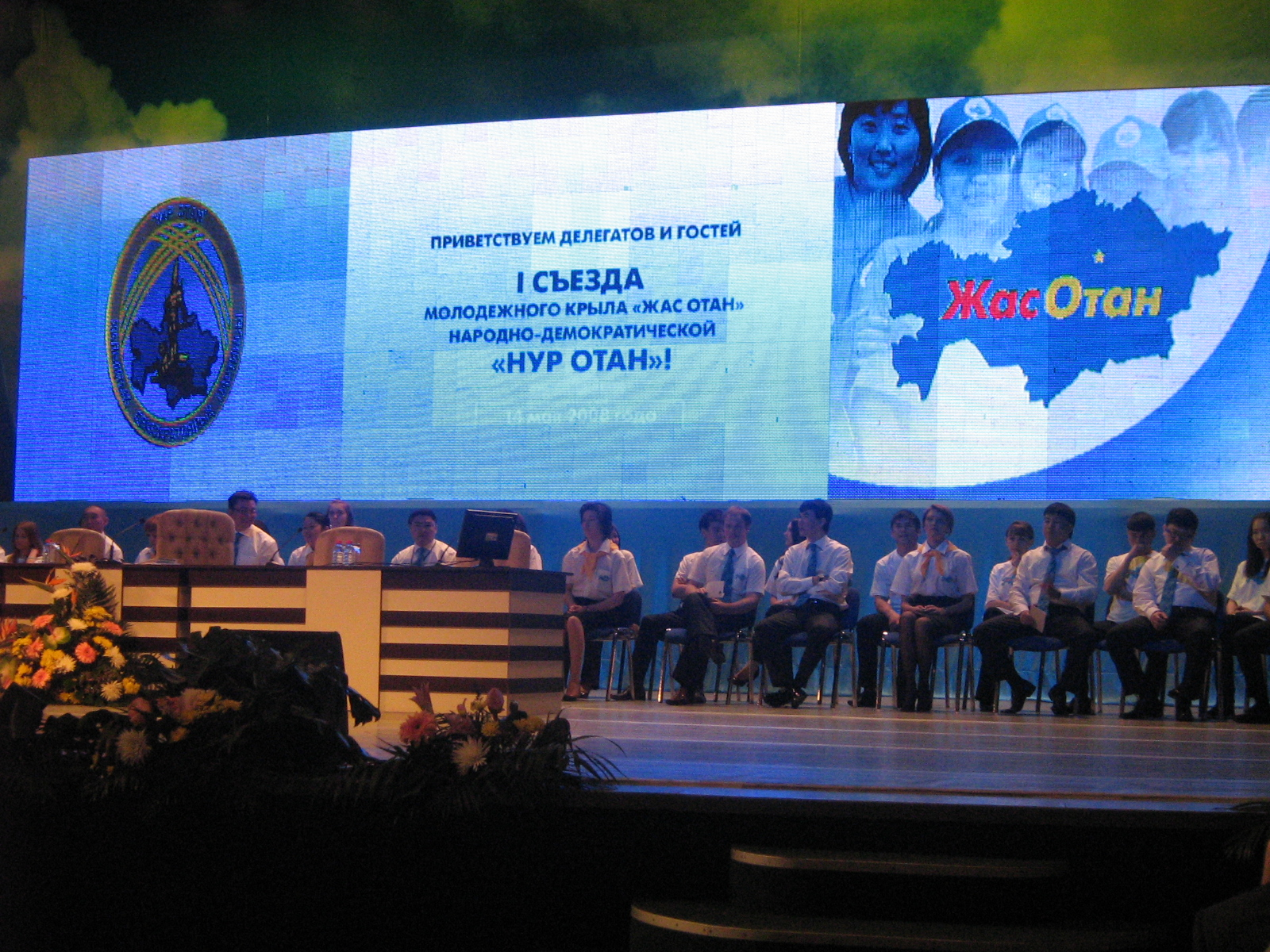
Central Council of Jas Otan.

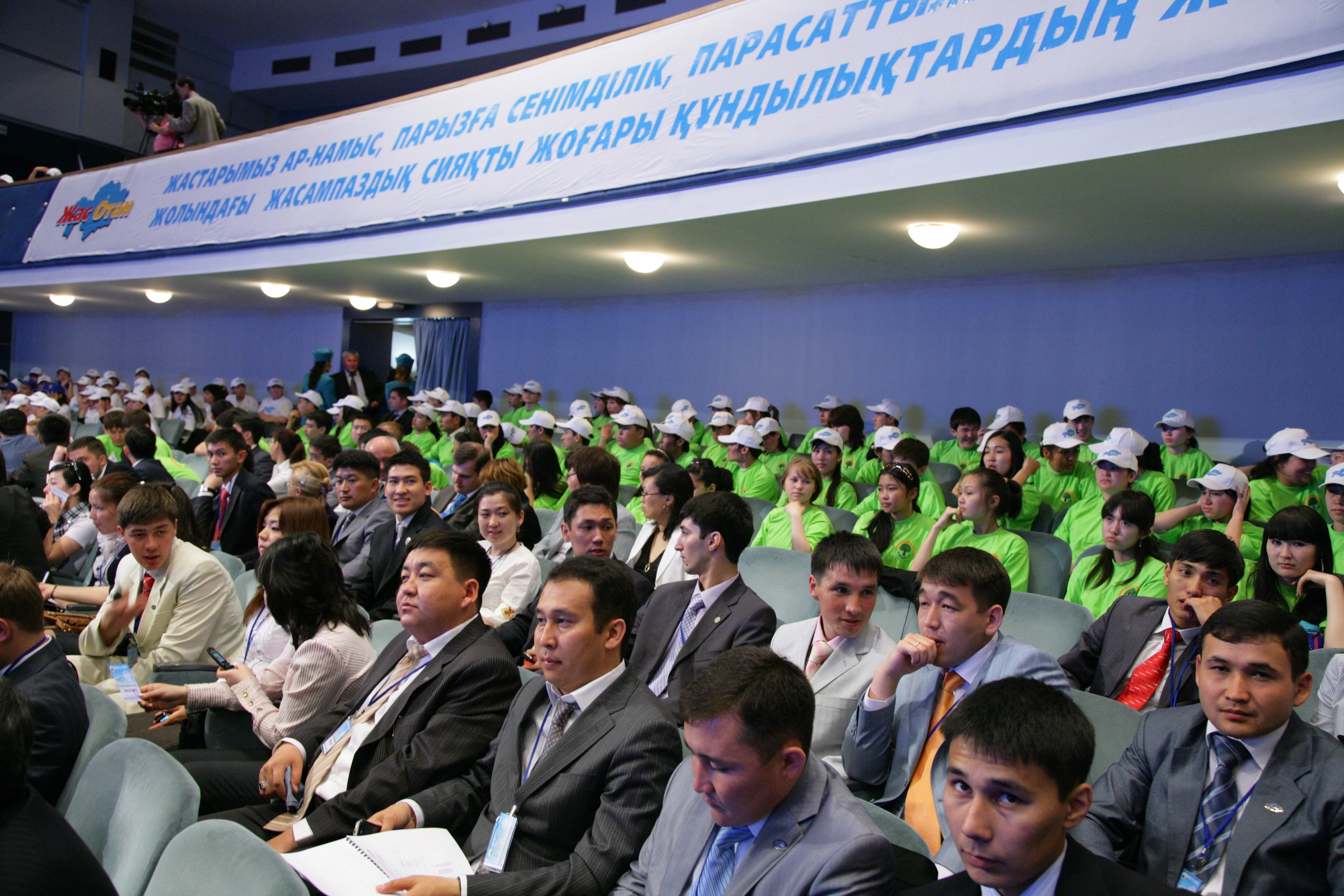
Delegates of the Congress.

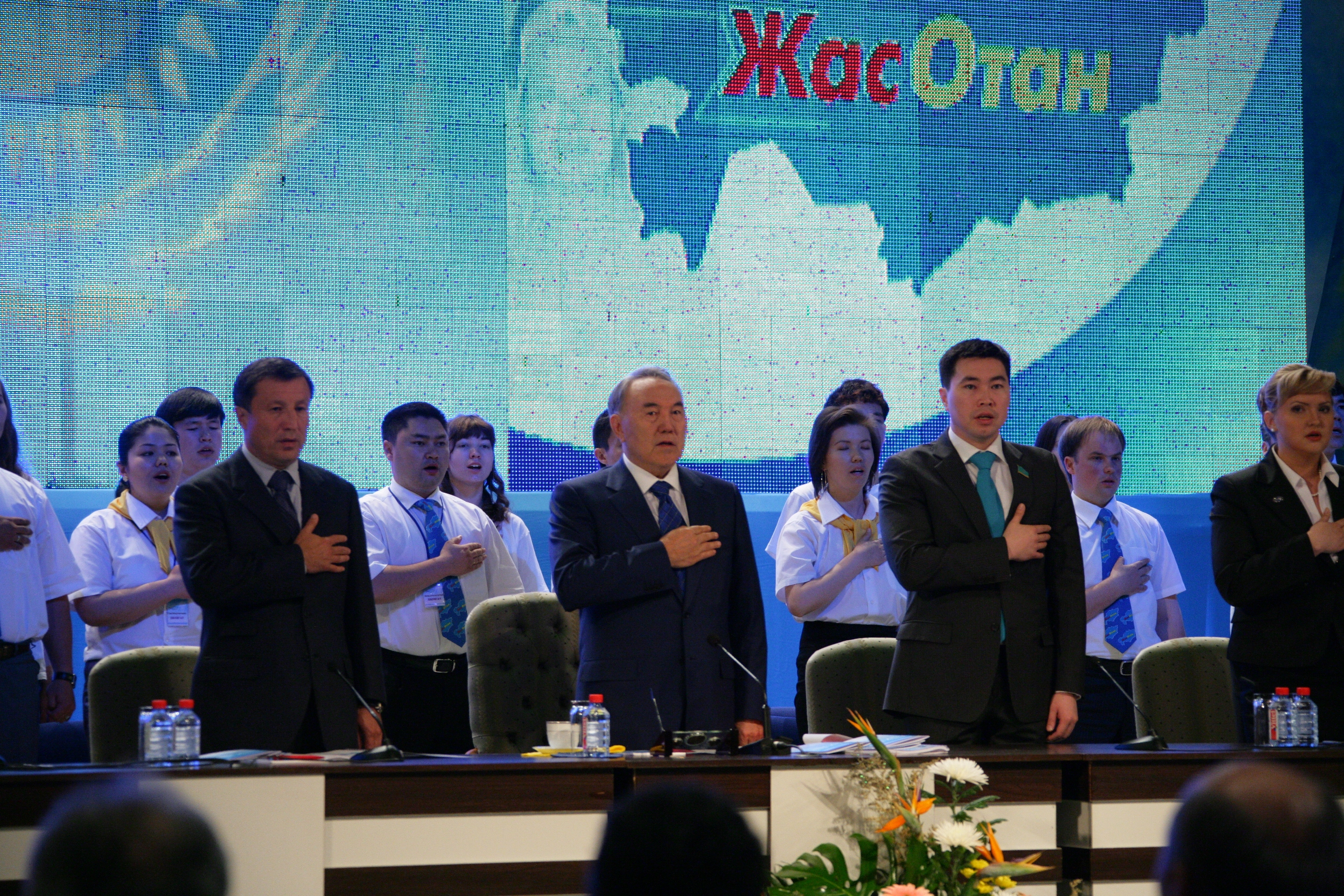
Honourable guest Nursultan Nazarbayev.

In January 2009, Jas Otan presented project "Black Label" in which the youth organisation declared that it would review complaints and appeals from citizens received in the public reception room of Nur Otan in 2008 and first half of 2009. After monitoring Jas Otan intended to identify state authorities, on whose wrongful acts the most complaints had been received, and to set mark "Black Label" at the front gate of a state body, the corruption in which had been more developed according to complains of citizens.

To execute assignment of the President of Kazakhstan to organize all-Kazakhstan marathon to support of needy students, which was announced on 12 February 2009 at enlarged meeting of the Bureau of Political Council of the Nur Otan, Jas Otan and the National Welfare Fund Samruk-Kazyna concluded a memorandum of understanding for providing educational grants for students. The Jas Otan had also conducted all-Kazakhstan TV marathon "Energy of the youth to the Fatherland, a noble heart to the youth" to support students.

In April 2010, Jas Otan held an action "Tarbagatay grief – grief of whole Kazakhstan" to collect clothes and food for flood victims in Tarbagatay rayon of East Kazakhstan region. On April 2 Karaganda branch of Jas Otan was the first among other branches to send humanitarian aid (one KAMAZ vehicle with food and a Gazelle with the necessary clothing).

In April – May 2010 in the framework of republican campaign "We are Kazakhstani people! Kazakhstan is our common home", the youth wing held a photo exhibition "There are 140 me in the word we" dedicated to inter-ethnic harmony.

On 16 June 2010 in the framework of republican campaign "Life without drugs", in all oblasts of Kazakhstan and the cities of Astana and Almaty various activities (sports, pickets, rallies, and other outreach activities) were held to propagandize fighting against drug addiction.

== Ideology ==
The youth wing Jas Otan supports the political platform of Nur Otan People's Democratic Party. The claimed mission of the organization is consolidation of young people of Kazakhstan on the basis of the political platform of the President to ensure the modernization breakthrough in development of the country; goal of Jas Otan is to create a strong and credible political youth organization capable of leading the youth.

To fulfill the mission and achieve the main goal, Jas Otan implements a number of priorities that define the main directions of the organization:

1. Consolidation of youth to support of the policy of the President. This priority involves ensuring youth consolidation at state-patriotic basis, development of complex measures to enhance confidence of youth to Nur Otan Party, further strengthening the authority of the President in youth environment.
2. Creating an effective system of youth development. According to this task, the organization developed a set of measures to ensure the effective participation of the youth wing Jas Otan in process of receiving experience of socio-economic, civil, political and other social activities by young citizens.
3. Protecting rights and interests of young people – ensuring completeness and quality of implementation of rights and government guarantees for young people under the acting legislation.
4. Expansion of the social base of the Nur Otan Party through involvement of broad stratums of young people to activities of Jas Otan. The youth wing develops mechanisms to increase number of party's members among the youth, to use their potential in achieving the goals of the party. Other youth organizations and associations are also involved to Jas Otan's activities.
5. Formation of cadre reserve for the party and state bodies. The task involves creating a system of identifying, training and recruitment of young leaders capable to become a cadre replenishment for Nur Otan Party and state authorities.

== Special Projects ==
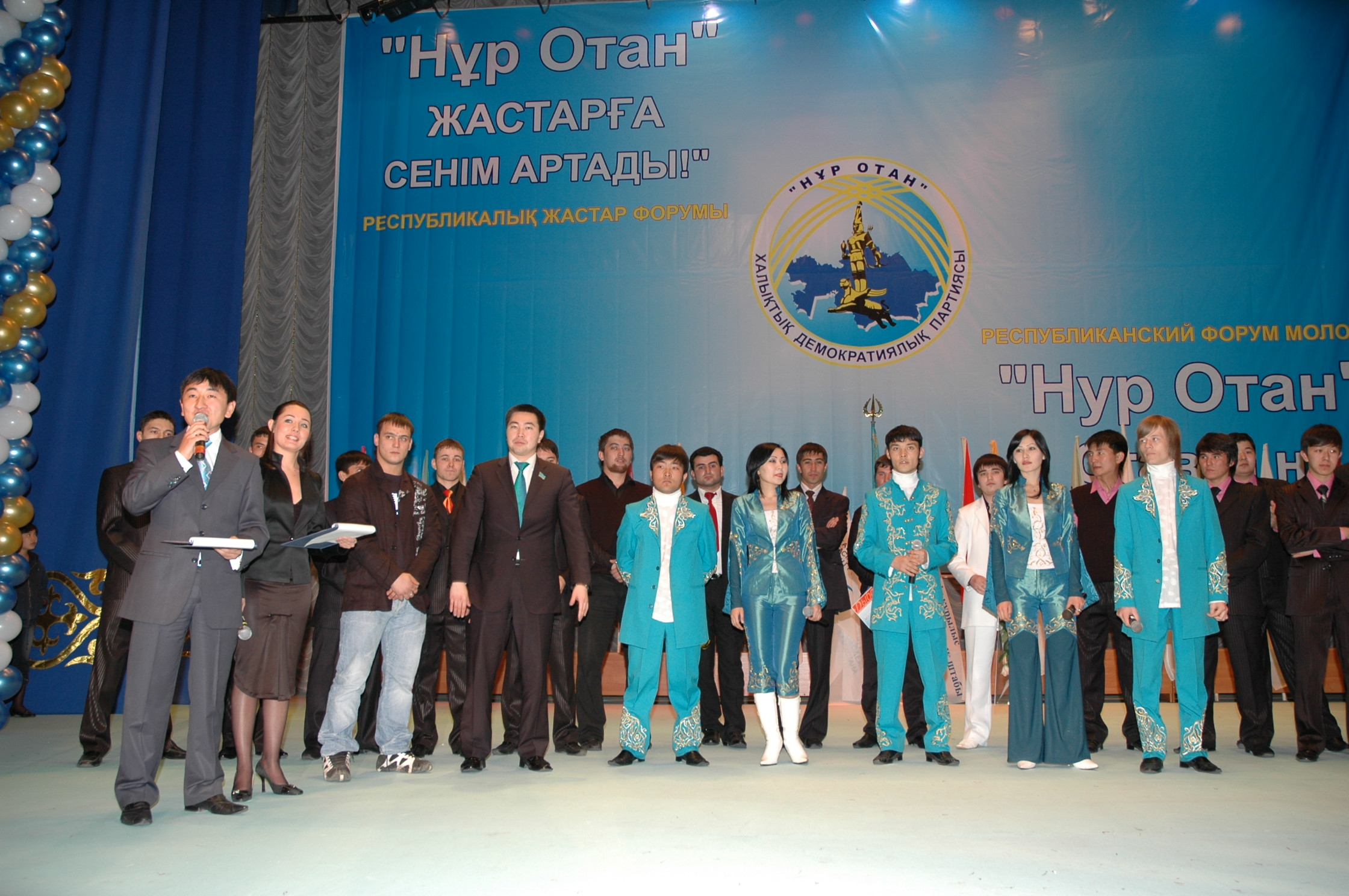
Youth forum of Nur Otan Party.

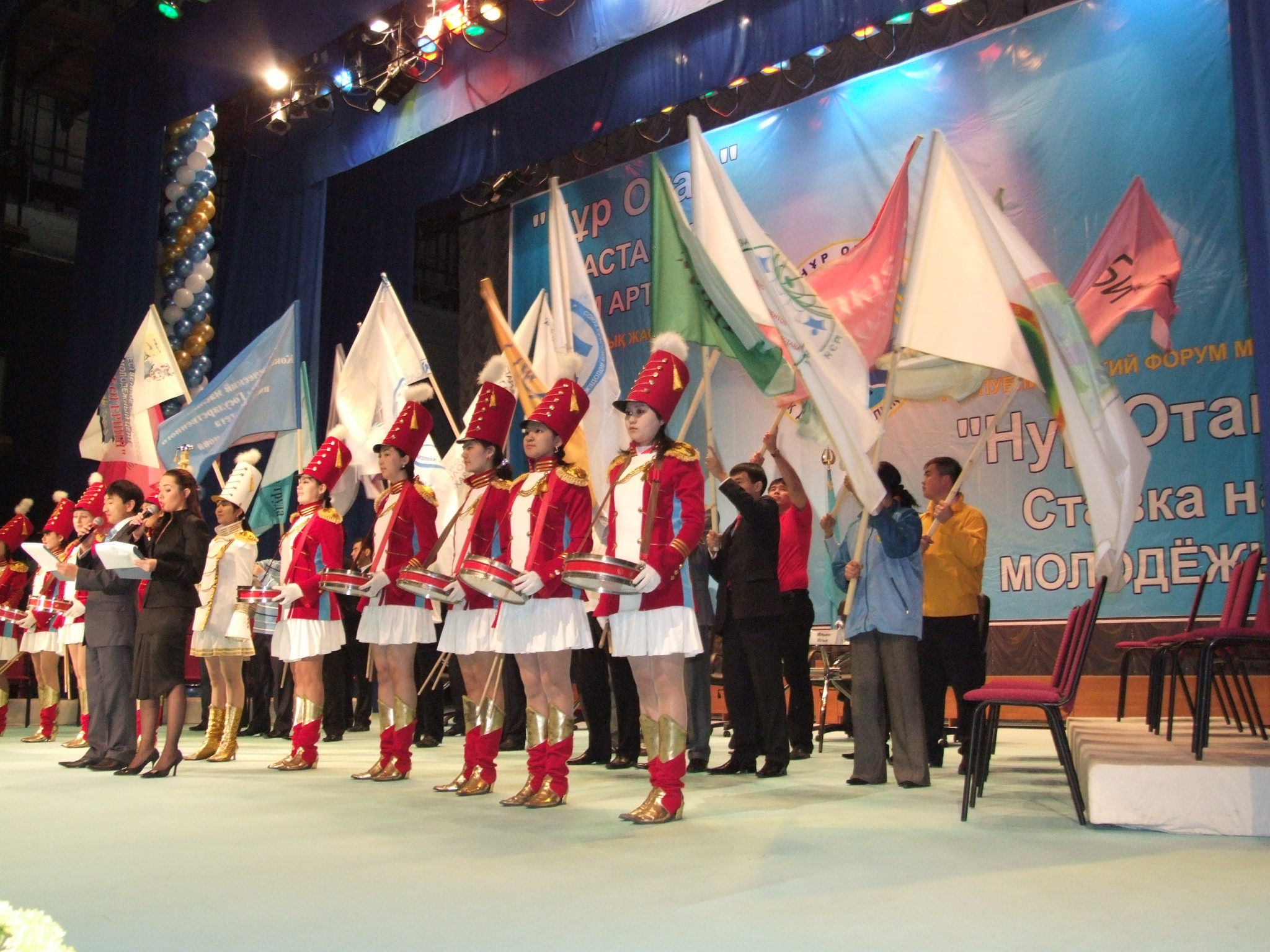
Youth forum of Nur Otan Party.

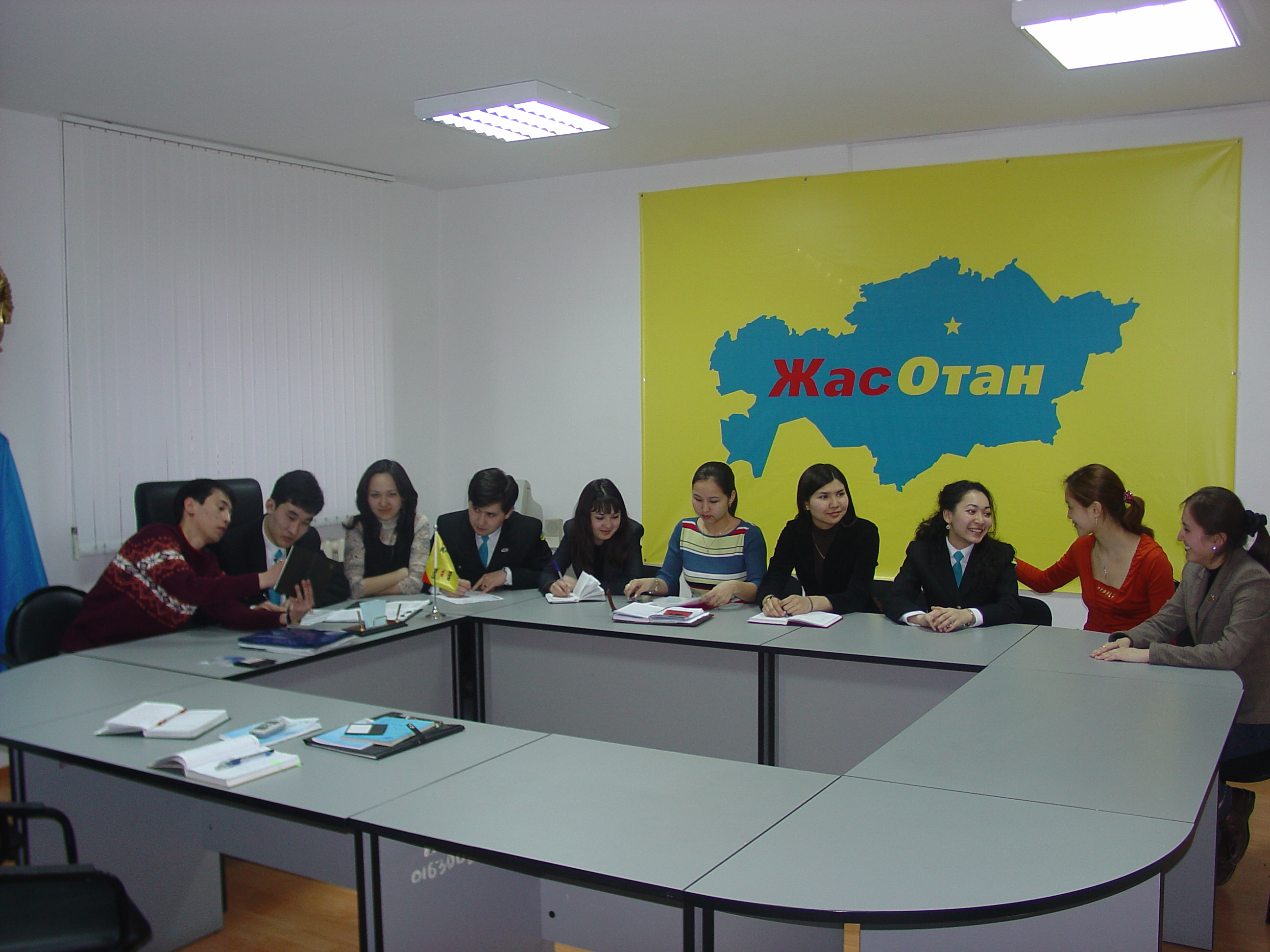
A round table.

Realizing the President's assignment, the Jas Otan developed and implemented the following special projects:

- In framework of program "The Youth to the Fatherland!" more than forty concepts on basis of regional branches of Jas Otan, as well as major youth organizations of the country, are implemented. Directions of the concepts are various: propaganda of patriotic values, development of social projects and initiatives of young people to support youth entrepreneurship. In addition, in framework of the project with support of the Ministry of Education and Science of Kazakhstan, Jas Otan organize innovative youth educational camp, which provides a good opportunity for an active and talented young people to organize a discussion platform between government representatives, business and youth.
- The main objectives of the project "Youth cadre reserve" are creating a human resources reserve of new formation managers, coordination of national and regional interests, strengthening regional and national human resource capacity. In 2009, as a result of selection of participants in an open competition among specialists not exceeded the age of 29, 107 specialists were chosen at the national level, 32 of them were selected by republican committee. From 7 to 31 July 2009, they were trained at the National Center for Management of State Service Personnel and also took part in initiated a republican campaign "Let's speak Kazakh", helped in building of a school in Ilinka village (Esil district). In period of 6–11 August 2009, a seminar in Zerenda was organized for participants of the project with attending by prominent scientists, statesmen and public figures of the country, such as Darhan Kaletaev, Quanys Sultanov, Bauyrjan Baibek, Albert Rau, Erlan Karin, Bolat Baikadamov, Nurlan Erimbetov and others. From the 12 August to 13 September 2009, reservists were trained in Nur Otan, central and local government bodies, Samruk-Kazyna National Welfare Fund; then, from 15 September to 13 November 2009, they were trained in Academy of State Management where there were meetings of reservists with such political and public figures as Minister of Environment Nurgali Ashimov, director of the Presidential Cultural Center Myrzatay Zholdasbekov, deputy of Mazhilis of Parliament Bekbolat Tleukhan and others. On 29–30 October 2009, reservists participated in meeting "Youth cadre reserve is the basis of continuity of the Eurasian integration" of leaders of youth wings of political parties and youth organizations of the CIS of SOC.
- Since early 2009, according to assigning of the Secretary of Nur Otan Erlan Karin, mobile discussion club "Erkin-Pikir" (Free Attitude) is held to change views, knowledge, and discuss actual issues by youth on the basis of the youth wing Jas Otan.
- With a goal to implement the Law of the Republic of Kazakhstan "On making amendments and additions to several legislative acts of the Republic of Kazakhstan on issues of social support and encouraging of social workers in rural settlements", from July 2009 the youth wing Jas Otan jointly with the Ministry of Agriculture of Kazakhstan and partners of Jas Otan – Union of Rural Youth of Kazakhstan and Students Alliance of Kazakhstan- implements project "With diploma – to the village!". In framework of the project providing information to population is organized through articles and interviews in media and Internet resources; video advertisement was released and broadcast on national channels. On the basis of regional branches of Jas Otan consultations and activities to encourage young people to go to live and work in rural areas are held.
- Republican campaign "Let's speak Kazakh!" is held in all regions of the country under the auspices of Nur Otan and the youth wing Jas Otan with purposes of increasing public role of the state language, attracting public attention to their mother language, expanding the sphere of use of the Kazakh language. During the action the following activities were conducted: presentation of projects "Ayaldama zhane Talap", "Qazaq tili kurstaryn uyimdastyru"and "Zhumyspen Sayakhat" in Kostanay, joint activities with high educational institutions in Jambyl Region, a meeting with Kazakh language training centers "Official Language: Prospects and Challenges" in Karaganda and others.

== Structure ==
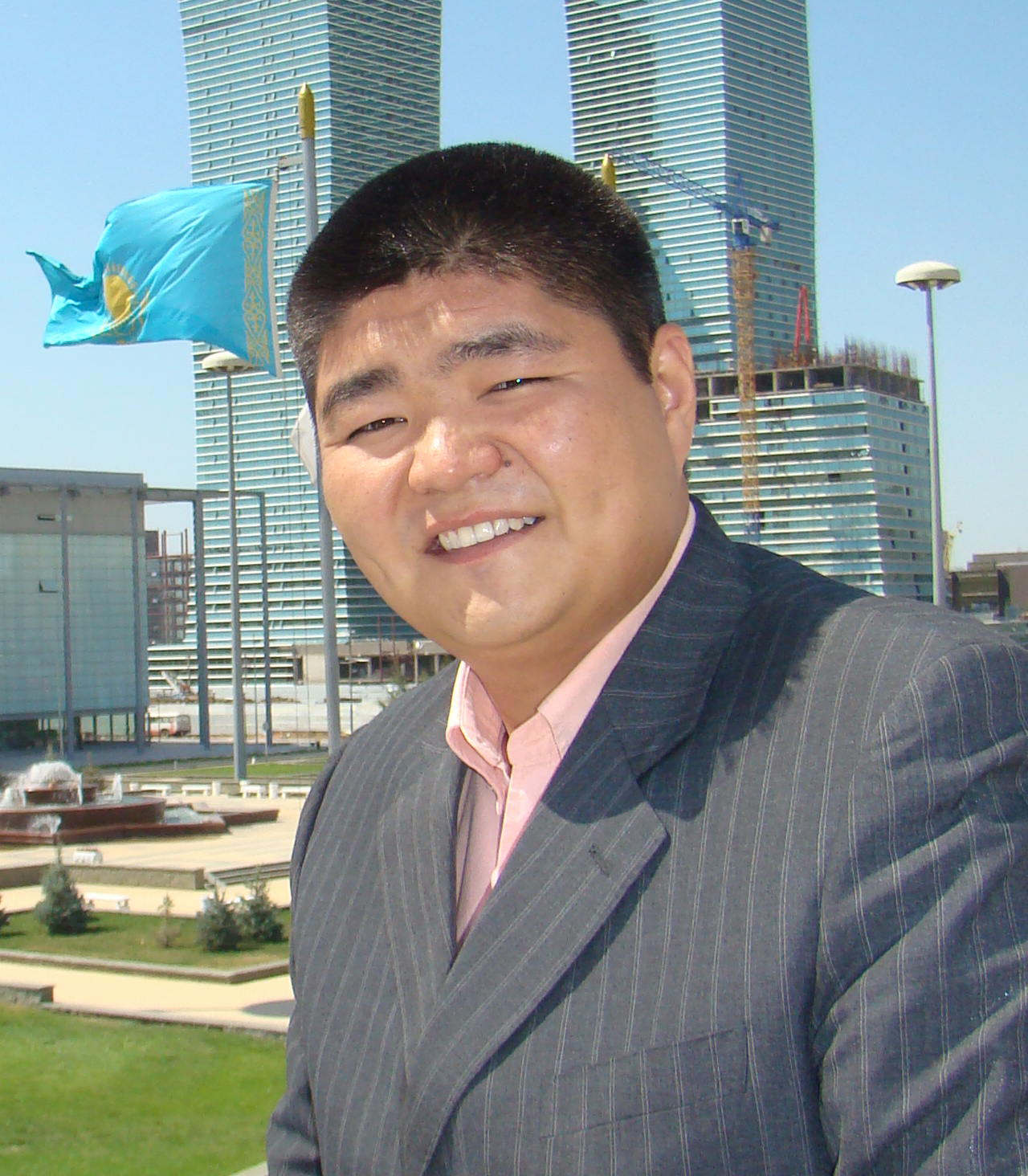
Nurlan Uteshev served as Jas Otan's first executive secretary from 2008 to 2010

Membership in Jas Otan is individual, voluntary and fixed; young people, who are citizens of Kazakhstan reached the age of 16 and who share and support the aims and objectives of the youth wing and actively involved in its activities, can become members of the organization according to written application. For every member of the youth wing Jas Otan ID and registration card are issued.

The supreme governing body of the youth wing Jas Otan is the Congress, which convened according to decision of the Central Council of Jas Otan at least every four years or as needed. Delegates to Congress are elected at regional conferences and conferences of Nur-Sultan and Almaty; in some cases – at the branches' councils of Jas Otan with participation of representatives from all city and district branches. The Congress makes decisions by simple majority voting of delegates present.

The governing body of Jas Otan is Central Council, which is created for the implementation of youth policies and governing of the youth wing's branches activities in period between Congresses. The Central Council consists of representatives of oblast, cities of Nur-Sultan and Almaty branches of the organization, activists and leaders of other youth organizations, elected at Congress for four years term.

The highest governing bodies of the oblast, cities of Nur-Sultan and Almaty, the city (district) branches of Jas Otan are conferences convened according to decision of branch's council as often as necessary, but at least once every two years. Delegates of conferences of regional branches, as well as of branches in Nur-Sultan and Almaty, are elected at conferences of city (district) branches of Jas Otan; in some cases according to decision of the Executive Secretary of regional branch.

The governing bodies of the oblast, cities of Nur-Sultan and Almaty and city (district) branches of the youth wing Jas Otan are councils of branches elected at a conference of regional branches, branches of Nur-Sultan and Almaty, in coordination with the Executive Secretary of Jas Otan. Council of city's (district's) branch shall be elected at a conference of city's (district's) branch in coordination with executive secretary of oblast, Nur-Sultan and Almaty branch of Jas Otan.

== Symbols ==
The youth wing Jas Otan has its emblem, anthem, flag and badge of a member of Jas Otan, official letterhead and other attributes approved at Congress. The emblem represents image of contour map of Republic of Kazakhstan, in the central part of which the name of the organization is located. The emblem is made in three colors: light blue symbolizing the color of blue sky overhead, eternity, devotion, faith, spiritual and intellectual life, the construction of light 'tomorrow'; yellow symbolizing synthesis, update, solution creation, birth, growth, the sun, existence of peace, harmony and embodiment of the best; red symbolizing warm feelings, love, warmth, joy, dedication, strength. The emblem of the organization is required for use on ID of a member of the youth wing Jas Otan, printings of the organization and other attributes.
