= Bauyrjan Baibek =

Kazakh politician (born 1974)

- Бауыржан Байбек
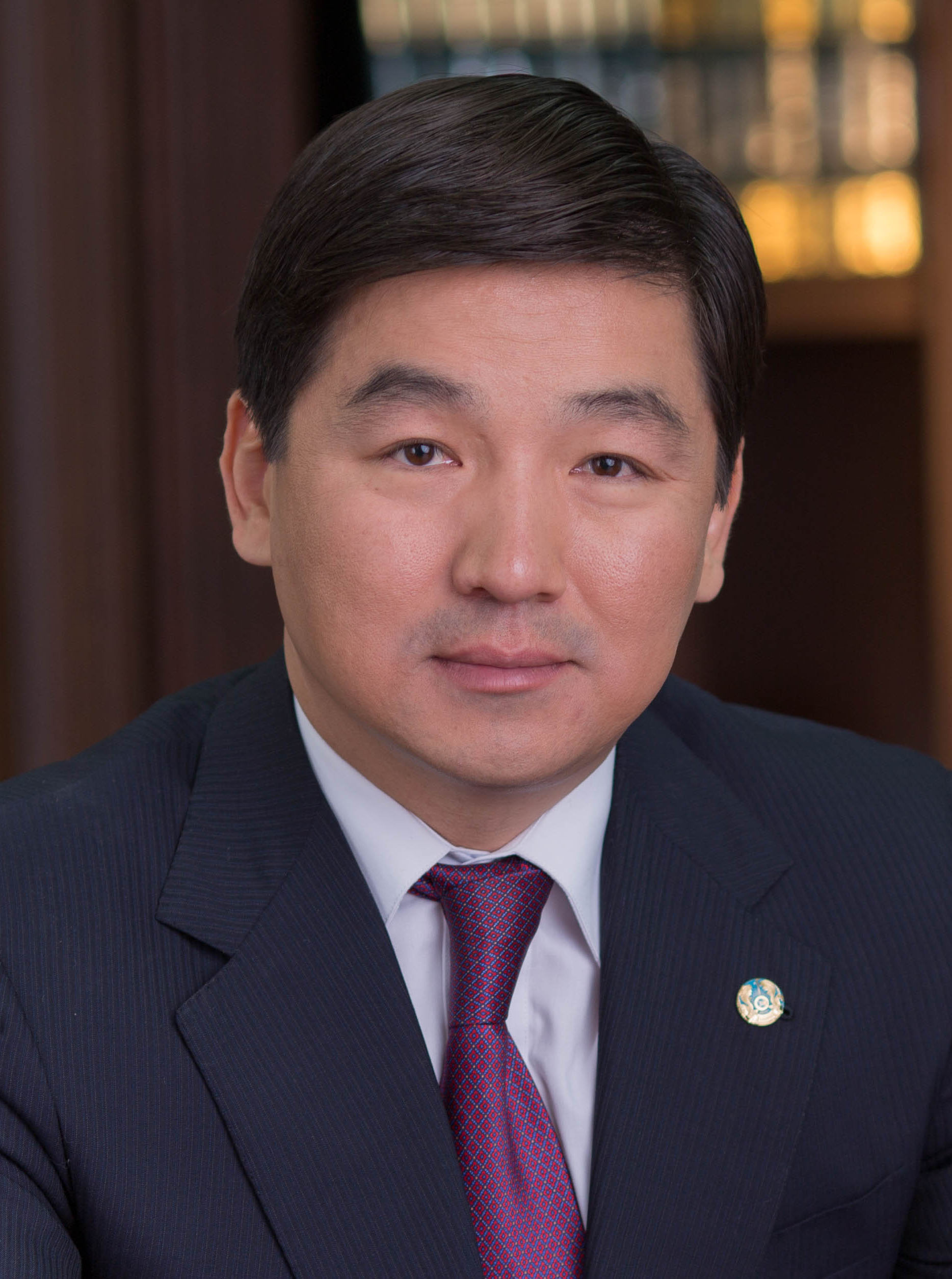
- Baibek in 2014

6th Äkim of Almaty
- In office 9 August 2015 – 28 June 2019
- Preceded by: Akhmetzhan Yessimov
- Succeeded by: Bakhytzhan Sagintayev

First Deputy Chairman of Nur Otan
- In office 29 June 2019 – 2 February 2022
- Chairman: Nursultan Nazarbayev; Kassym-Jomart Tokayev
- Preceded by: Mäulen Äşimbaev
- Succeeded by: Office abolished; Ashat Oralov as the Executive Secretary
- In office 17 January 2013 – 8 August 2015
- Chairman: Nursultan Nazarbayev
- Preceded by: Bakhytzhan Sagintayev
- Succeeded by: Askar Myrzakhmetov

Personal details
- Born: 19 March 1974 (age 52) Alma-Ata, Kazakh SSR, Soviet Union
- Party: Nur Otan
- Spouse: Janar Baibek
- Children: 5
- Education: Kulyash Baiseitova Music School; Goethe-Institut; Lübeck Academy of Music; University of Central Asia

Bauyrjan Qydyrgaliuly Baibek (Kazakh: Бауыржан Қыдырғалиұлы Байбек; born 19 March 1974) is a Kazakh politician who served as the äkim of Almaty from 9 August 2015 to 28 June 2019. Baibek was the First Deputy Chairman of Nur Otan from 29 June 2019 to 2 February 2022 and previously from 17 January 2013 to 8 August 2015.

== Early life and education ==
Baibek was born in the city of Alma-Ata (present-day Almaty) in 1974. After graduating from the Kulyash Bayseitova Musical School in Almaty with honors in piano, he entered the Kurmangazy Conservatory in 1992. From 1994 to 1998, he studied in Germany under the Bolashak Scholarship. In 1995, Baibek earned a degree in German Language from the Goethe-Institut’s annual program in Bremen. He then graduated from the Lübeck Academy of Music with a specialty as a teacher in 1998.

In 2002, Baibek graduated in absentee from the Central Asian University (now closed) in Almaty with a degree in international economics.

In 2010, he defended his thesis on "The institutionalization of the state protocol of the Republic of Kazakhstan", earning doctoral degree in political science.

== Early career ==
From 1999 to 2002, Baibek worked as a referent, attaché of the Consulate General of Kazakhstan in Frankfurt and the third secretary of Economic missions of Kazakhstan in Germany in the city of Berlin.

From 2002 to 2003, he served as an expert in the Central Systems Research of the Presidential Administration of Kazakhstan.

From 2004 to 2006, Baibek was the chief inspector of the Protocol of the President of Kazakhstan. In 2006, he became the chief of the Protocol of the President and worked in this position until August 2009, when he became the deputy head of the Presidential Administration.

== First Deputy Chairman of Nur Otan (2013–2015, 2019–2022) ==
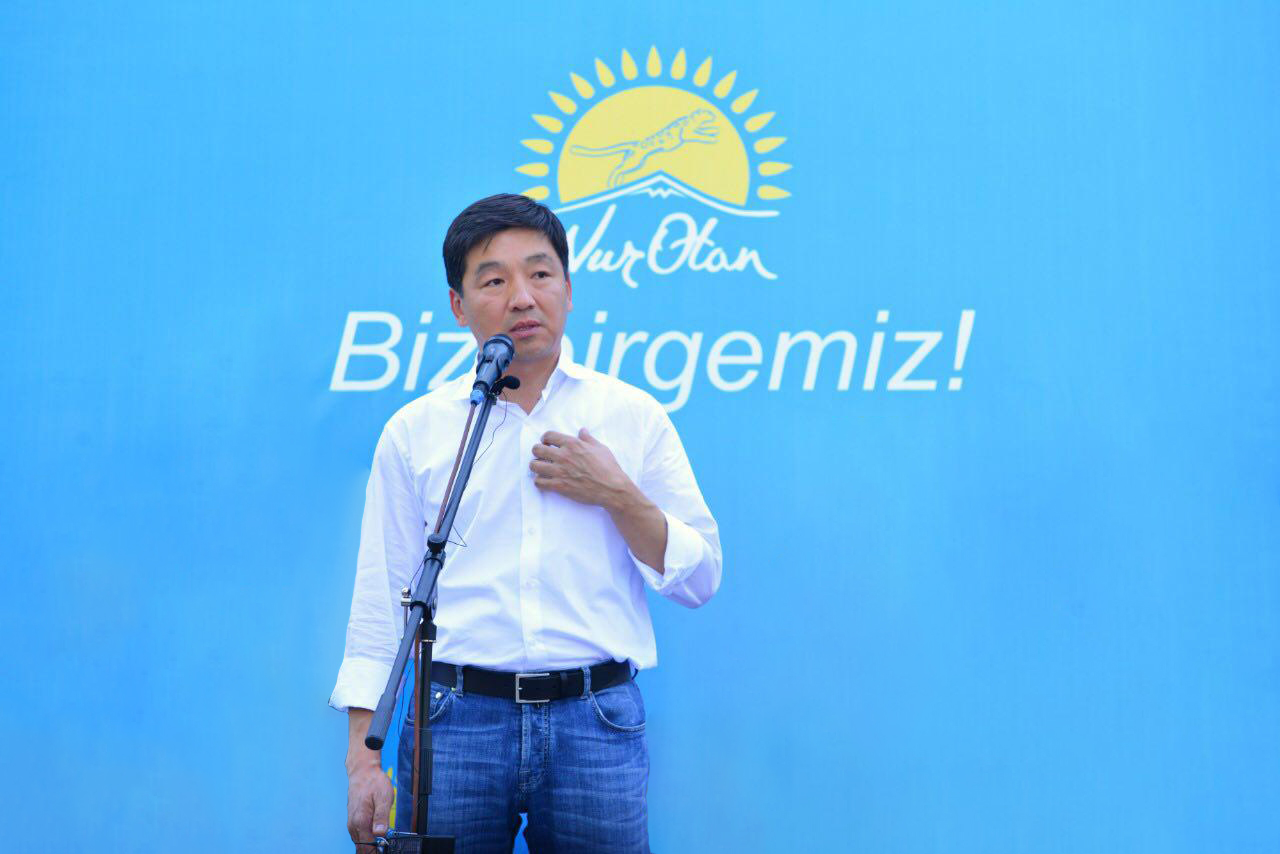
Baibek in Shymkent, August 2019

On 17 January 2013, Baibek was appointed as the First Deputy Chairman of Nur Otan.

In 2014, under Baibek, an anti-corruption program of the Nur Otan was developed and adopted for 2015 to 2025.

In March 2015, the party initiated a number of projects dedicated to the 70th anniversary of Victory Day. In the framework of the project “Ардагерлерді ардақтайық” (“Taking Care of the Older Generation”), a complete data was restored on 531 Heroes of the Soviet Union and more than 124 full cavaliers of the Order of Glory. With the assistance of the Nur Otan, the cycle “Қазақстандық қаһармандар” (“Heroic annals of Kazakhstanis”) started. Hundred videos in Kazakh and Russian languages about Kazakh World War II veterans were shown on the Astana channel.

On 28 June 2019, Baibek was reappointed again as the First Deputy Chairman. He served the post until 2 February 2022 when he stepped down shortly after President Kassym-Jomart Tokayev became the new party leader. In his Facebook page, Baibek cited the reason for his resignation was due to the Nur Otan requiring "new tasks that require fresh approaches and views." In his statement, he gave remarks about his work in the party which were contributing to strengthening Kazakhstan's independence, thanking former President and party leader Nazarbayev and incumbent President Tokayev for trust and support, as well as the party's apparatus staff and members. Following Baibek's dismissal, the post of the First Deputy Chairman was abolished and replaced by the executive secretary for the party, who became Ashat Oralov.

== Äkim of Almaty (2015–2019) ==
=== Transportation ===
==== Tram closure ====
On 31 October 2015, tram traffic was closed in Almaty due to the results of the inspection, which revealed numerous irregularities and inconsistencies: there were gaps of up to 50 mm at all assembly joints, rail wear was up to 2–2.5 cm, wooden sleepers were rotten. Due to the condition of the tram tracks, wheel sets of wagons were heavily worn out. In 2014, there were 20 facts of the derailment of cars. Up until September 2015, there were 43 derailments. In 2017, the dismantling of tram tracks began.

==== Onai System ====
On 11 January 2016, the public transport system "Onai" was introduced, which was non-cash fare system. The system deduced unaccounted cash from the shadow turnover. In September 2016, the cash payment of Almaty residents for a month amounted to 256 million tenge, with cards to only 0.8 billion tenge. In September 2017, the monthly cash income was 91 million tenge, and through the Onai card, 1.5 billion tenge. 800 million tenge were withdrawn from the shadow turnover in one month.

==== Upgrades ====
Under the leadership of Baibek, public transport was updated by 80%, almost 1300 new buses were purchased. In January 2016, 70% of the state-owned company “Almatyelektrotrans” was transferred to a private investor Green Bus Company LLP for 5 years in trust without the right to subsequent redemption.

==== Bus rapid transit ====
In September 2018, the first BRT line in the country was launched on Timiryazev Street, at peak hours, the speed of buses along the line was 3 times higher than cars. Already in the first 10 days of operation, passenger flow increased by 40% from 100,000 to 140,000 people.

=== Speed limit ===
After speed reduction on Al-Farabi Avenue from 80 to 60 km, the number of accidents decreased by 2.7 times. On the one-sided Kurmangazy street, the number of accidents decreased by 41%, and on Shevchenko street was 4 times.

=== Urban policies ===
For several years, work was underway to reconstruct the central streets of the city for pedestrians. One of the main objects of change was Panfilov Street, which became a pedestrian street from Zhibek Zholy Street to Qabanbai Batyr Street.

Under Baibek, more than 600 streets and almost 1,600 courtyards of Almaty were repaired, where modern children's and sports grounds, surveillance cameras, and courtyard lighting appeared. 30% of street lighting was converted to energy-saving LED lighting. 300 km of irrigation ditches and 2000 km of engineering networks were also repaired and built. Almost 3000 illegal kiosks were demolished in the city.

Baubek announced the City Without Fences program, in which 150 km of fences were dismantled. Many organizations planted bushes and trees as a replacement.

In October 2015, the building of the former General Plan on Jeltoqsan Street was demolished. Members of the Defend Almaty initiative group gathered near the building, claiming that work was being carried out illegally, but the city planning council issued all the necessary permits. In October 2015, with the approval of the Town Planning Council, the Alatau Cinema building, built in 1960, was demolished for the construction of McDonald's. Social media users organized a flash mob against the demolition of the building. In response to the controversies, Baibek stated that for 20 years the cinema was empty, and it did not represent historical value, since it was made of alucobond.

A project for preventive monitoring of mudflow hazard was developed. Seismic amplification of 65% of educational facilities and 53% of healthcare was carried out. To protect against mudflows, the Mynjylky Dam was reconstructed, 9 of the most breakthrough moraine lakes were emptied. 9 rivers canals were reconstructed. Protective structures strengthened the slopes at HES-1 - BAO and Medeu - Shymbulak.

For the first time in the city, the “Participation Budget” project was implemented where a part of the city budget is distributed by the citizens themselves.

=== Social objects ===
In a few years, 11 schools and more than 540 public and private kindergartens were opened, and 12 hospitals and clinics were commissioned. Within the framework of the project “Baityt Obybasy”, the payment for kindergartens was halved, and a large number of private kindergartens were opened. As a result of this work, more than 20 thousand children were enrolled in kindergartens.

From 2015, Almaty schools, colleges, hospitals and KSK began to publish their reports on financial activities.

In February 2019, a simplified mortgage lending program was launched for large families.

While Baibek was akim, many medical centers were sold into private ownership. The privatization plan of these and other facilities in the country was previously approved by the Decree of the Government of Kazakhstan from 30 December 2015 No. 1141 “On some issues of privatization for 2016-2020”.

=== Criticism ===
In May 2017, environmental activists of the “Defend Almaty” and “Defend Kokkailau” groups gave the Akim a gift-installation “Death of Almaty”, which, according to the authors of the present, symbolizes the concern of the townspeople about the activities of the city akim. That same month, the appeal of a public figure Denis Krivosheev to Baibek was published.
