= Astana City Mäslihat =

Legislature of Astana, Kazakhstan

Astana City Mäslihat Астана қаласының мәслихаты (Kazakh) Маслихат города Астаны (Russian)

Type
- Type: Unicameral

History
- Founded: 10 December 1993
- Preceded by: Akmola City Soviet

Leadership
- Chairman: Erlan Kanalimov, Amanat since March 2023

Structure
- Seats: 34
- Political groups: Party-list deputies (17); Amanat (12); Aq Jol (3); People's Party (1); Baytaq (1); Single-mandate deputies (17); Individual mandate (17)

Elections
- Last election: 19 March 2023
- Next election: 2028

Meeting place
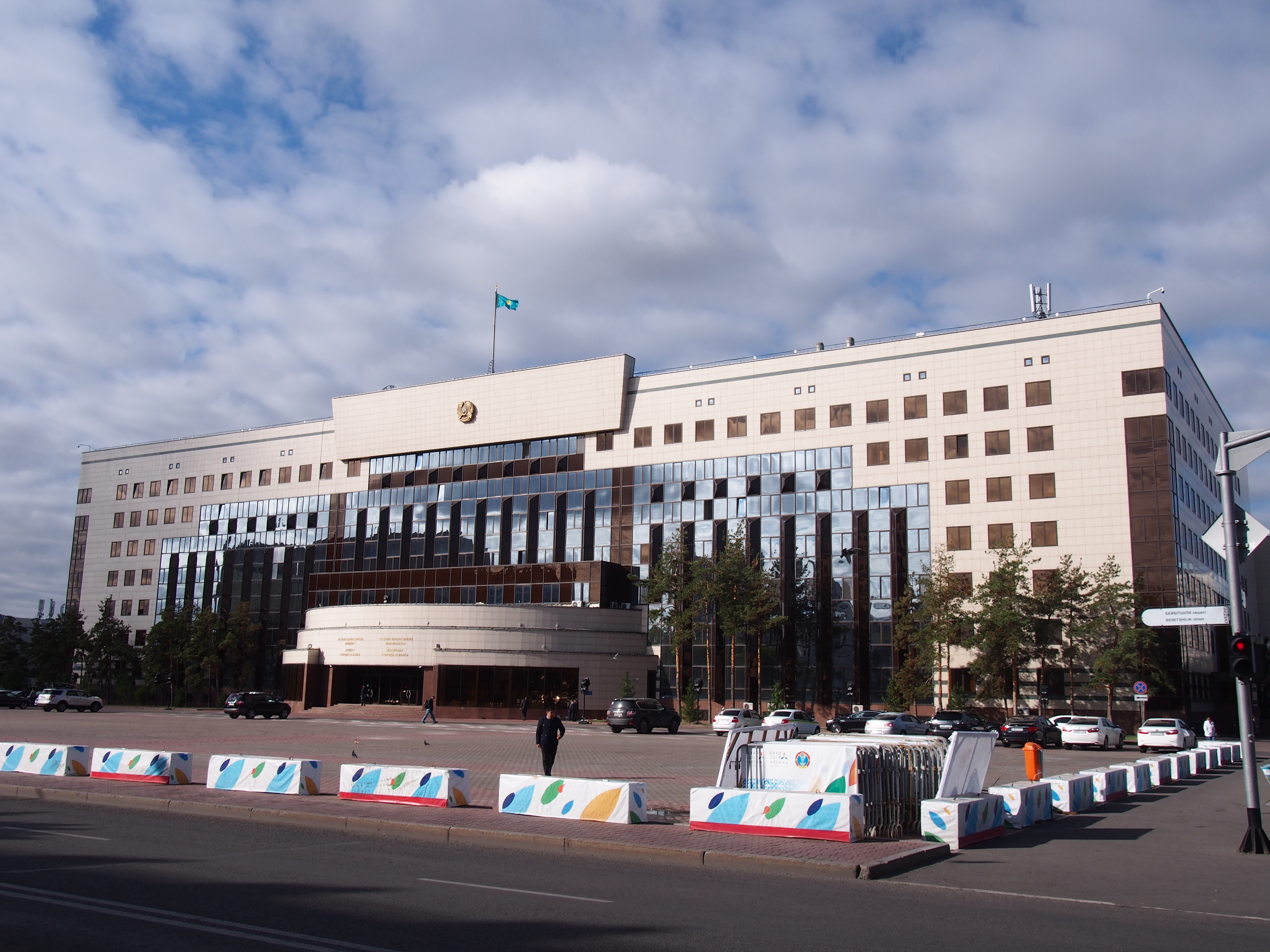

Website
- maslihat01.kz

The Astana City Mäslihat (Kazakh: Астана қаласының мәслихаты, romanized: Astana qalasynyñ mäslihaty; Russian: Маслихат города Астаны, romanized: Maslikhat goroda Astany) is the unicameral legislature of Astana, Kazakhstan's capital city. The deputies of the City Mäslihat are elected concurrently with the deputies of the Mäjilis. The City Mäslihat deputies perform their duties by approving plans, economic and social programs for the city's development.

== Composition ==
The City Mäslihat is composed of 34 deputies, half of which are elected through party-list proportional representation and the other half of which are elected through single-mandate election. Before the 2023 election, the Mäslihat consisted of only 31 deputies who were elected through proportional representation.

== History ==
The Astana City Mäslihat was established on 10 December 1993 after the Supreme Council of Kazakhstan adopted the law "On local representative and executive bodies of the Republic of Kazakhstan", which made significant changes to the name and structure of local state bodies. The city held the elections on 10 March 1994 to elect the councillors of the 1st convocation of the City Mäslihat. Until 2021, the councillors represented single-member constituencies and were elected by a secret ballot every 5 years according to the Clause 2 of Article 86 of the Constitution of Kazakhstan, Section VIII "Local state government and self-government".

In 1998, the city changed its name after it became the new capital of Kazakhstan, making it the Astana City Mäslihat.

After President Nursultan Nazarbayev's resignation in March 2019, Astana was renamed into Nursultan with City Mäslihat councillors unanimously supporting the change by having the name including hyphen between Nur and Sultan.

In January 2021, the City Mäslihat elections were held where for the first time, 31 councillors were elected on the basis of party-list proportional representation. The Nur Otan swept majority of 26 seats followed by the minor parties of Aq Jol and People's Party.

In September 2022, the city of Nur-Sultan was renamed to Astana, meaning the Mäslihat's name would revert back to Astana City Mäslihat.

In 2023, a snap parliamentary election in March was announced, regional mäslihat elections were held simultaneously. The 2023 Astana City Mäslihat election began the VIII Convocation of the Mäslihat, this time half of the councillors were elected through party-list proportional representation, where Amanat once again became the majority party, and the other half were elected through single-mandate voting.

== Functions ==
The City Mäslihat deputies perform their duties on an exempt basis, excluding secretary, who shall be elected from among the council members and shall perform his duties on an exempt basis. The mäslihat has no rights of a legal entity. Within its competence, the mäslihat approves plans, economic and social programs for the city's development, approves and controls the implementation of the budget of the region, regulates land relations, issues of administrative and territorial structure, promotes the implementation by citizens and organizations of the norms of the Constitution of the Republic of Kazakhstan, laws, and acts by the President of Kazakhstan, regulatory actions by the central and local government bodies. The mäslihat exercises its powers at meetings, through the standing committees, chairman of the session and secretary along with the mäslihat councillors.

== Commissions ==
For the initial examination of the issues submitted for discussion of the sessions, the assistance of the adoption of the decisions of the City Mäslihat and the enforcement of the control functions, the mäslihat includes 4 committees which are:

- Budget, Economy, Industry and Entrepreneurship Issues
- Issues of Legality, Law and Order and Work with the Public
- Construction, Ecology, Transport, Trade and Housing and Communal Services;
- Issues of Social and Cultural Development

Public hearings are conducted in standing committees with the involvement of councillors, executive authorities, associations, the media and people in order to address the most relevant and socially significant issues. In addition, the commissions exercise power over the execution of the decisions of the mäslihat, the programs implemented and other actions of the state authorities and the administration. The standing committees shall be accountable to the mäslihat whom were elected by and are obliged to report their activities yearly. Particular attention shall be paid to the work of councillors with the population at the place of residence. In accordance with current law, the deputies of the mäslihat have an imperative mandate and are obligated to maintain continuous contact with the voters of their electoral district, notify them on a regular basis of the work and the activities of its standing committees and the implementation of the decisions of the mäslihat. Councillors regularly receive voters at their place of residence, who consider their legislative proposals. The procedure for holding the mäslihat sessions, the meetings of its bodies, the establishment and consideration of issues, the composition and election of the mäslihat bodies and other organizational and procedural issues shall be decided by the rules of the mäslihat adopted at the session.

== Convocations ==
- 1st (1994–1999)
- 2nd (1999–2004)
- 3rd (2004–2007)
- 4th (2007–2012)
- 5th (2012–2016)
- 6th (2016–2021)
- 7th (2021–2023)
- 8th (2023–present)
