= Amanat (political party) =

Political party in Kazakhstan

Amanat Аманат
- Chairman: Erlan Qoşanov (Note: Also serves as the Parliamentary leader.)
- Executive Secretary: Daulet Karibek
- Founders: Nursultan Nazarbayev; Sergey Tereshchenko
- Founded: 12 February 1999
- Dissolved: 14 June 2026
- Preceded by: People's Union of Kazakhstan Unity
- Merged into: Ädilet
- Headquarters: Yesil district, st. D. Konaev, 12/1, Astana
- Youth wing: Jastar Ruhy
- Membership: 800,000 (2023)
- Ideology: Kazakh nationalism; Social conservatism; Economic liberalism; Social democracy; Third Way
- Political position: Big tent
- National affiliation: People's Coalition (2022)
- Colours: Aqua; White

Website
- amanatpartiasy.kz
- Politics of Kazakhstan; Political parties; Elections; Formerly: Otan (12 February 1999 – 22 December 2006); Nur Otan (22 December 2006 – 1 March 2022)

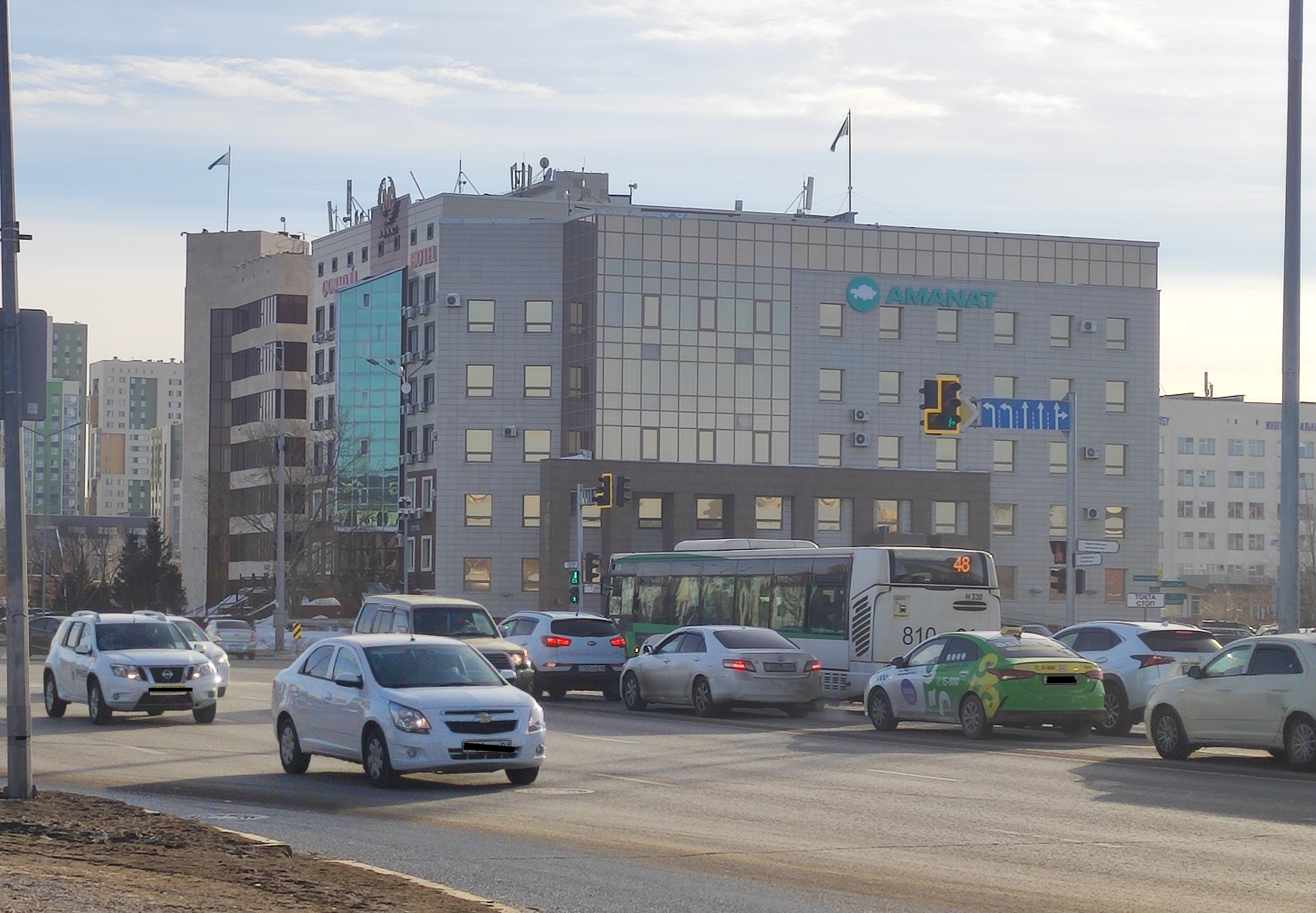
One of the offices of the party found in Astana

Amanat, (Note: /ˌɑːmɑːˈnɑːt/; Kazakh: Аманат, lit. 'Covenant'; officially stylized in all caps) previously known as Nur Otan, (Note: /ˌnɜːr oʊˈtɑːn/; Kazakh: Нұр Отан, romanized: Nūr Otan, lit. 'Radiant Fatherland') was a political party of Kazakhstan and the largest political association in the country, with around 800,000 members as of 2023. The party held a majority of seats in the Mäjilis, the lower house of Parliament of Kazakhstan, maintaining its dominant influence in the nation's legislature.

Originally founded in 1999 as the Otan (Kazakh: Отан, lit. 'Fatherland'), the party was formed through the merger of several pro-presidential groups, including the People's Union of Kazakhstan Unity, the Liberal Movement of Kazakhstan, and the For Kazakhstan — 2030 Movement. In 2006, the party was renamed Nur Otan, and in 2022, it adopted the name Amanat.

Under the leadership of Nursultan Nazarbayev from its founding following the 1999 presidential election until 2022, Amanat became the ruling party of Kazakhstan, consistently winning presidential and parliamentary elections with large supermajorities. The party was frequently accused of electoral fraud and systemically suppressing opposition, especially during elections where it held a monopoly in the Parliament. In 2007, Nur Otan secured all contested seats in the Mäjilis, cementing its status as the country's dominant political force. Allegations continued after 2012, when other parties gained limited representation.

After Nazarbayev's withdrawal from active politics in 2022, Mäjilis chairman Erlan Qoşanov assumed the position of party leadership, becoming the first non-executive official to chair Amanat, following a brief tenure by President Kassym-Jomart Tokayev. Despite this leadership transition, Amanat remained a party of power, continuing to align towards Tokayev's administration. The party strongly supported Tokayev's constitutional reforms in the 2022 referendum that aimed at shifting to a more balanced president-parliamentary system, while also backing his successful independent campaign bid during the 2022 snap presidential election as part of the People's Coalition. From 2023, Amanat had maintained its majority control of the Mäjilis, playing a central role in the nation's political and economic developments. In June 2026, Amanat voted to dissolve its independent structure at an extraordinary congress, choosing to merge into the newly established Ädilet party ahead of the 2026 legislative election.

During its existence, Amanat had been described as a big tent party, generally leaning conservative, with a focus on stability, national unity, and economic development. It promoted reforms in areas such as civil service, economic diversification, and the rule of law. The party's governance style had been described as authoritarian, with critics noting restrictions on political freedoms and limited opposition.

Amanat had a widespread presence across Kazakhstan's administrative divisions and held numerous local offices, maintaining legislative control through deputy groups in local assemblies (mäslihats) throughout the country.

== History ==
=== Foundation ===
Amanat traces back to its origins in October 1998, when the Public Headquarters in Support of the Candidate for President of the Republic of Kazakhstan Nazarbayev N.A. during the 1999 election was formed, then ran by former Prime Minister Sergey Tereshchenko. The party derived its name from the Arabic word watan (fatherland), which is spelled as otan in the Kazakh language. Shortly following President Nursultan Nazarbayev's re-election win, a decision was made at the headquarters' meeting on 19 January 1999 to convert the formerly campaign staff into the "Otan" Republican Political Party (Kazakh: «Отан» Республикалық саяси партиясы; Russian: Республиканская политическая партия «Отан»), which was subsequently registered on 12 February 1999.

Its 1st Founding Congress was held on 1 March 1999 in Almaty, an event which was attended by about 400 delegates from all regions, cities and districts of the country. Amongst them were representatives of 17 nationalities, 104 entrepreneurs and businessmen, 67 public sector workers, 122 civil servants. The party outlined a program largely supportive of Nursultan Nazarbayev, who was elected by the delegates as the Otan chairman. However, Nazarbayev declined to take over the chairmanship on a constitutional basis, resulting in Tereshchenko taking the role as the acting chairman while Nazarbayev himself would serve as the de facto party leader. Speaking at the congress, the Nazarbayev stated that:

"The country can relatively painlessly survive the modern world challenges, only strengthening the internal economy, internal political stability, only demonstrating civil consolidation and solidarity. And in this regard, I have special hopes for the political party being created today, which we decided to call the word 'Otan' (Fatherland). The main thing is that the party is created from below, at the initiative of those thousands of volunteers who supported my candidacy for the Presidency in all the settlements of our country."
– President Nursultan Nazarbayev, speaking at the 1st Founding Congress, 1 March 1999

At the congress, several pro-presidential parties: the People's Union of Kazakhstan Unity, Liberal Movement of Kazakhstan, Democratic Party, and For Kazakhstan-2030 were merged with Otan.

On 23 April 1999, the party was re-registered in the Ministry of Justice.

=== Nazarbayev leadership ===
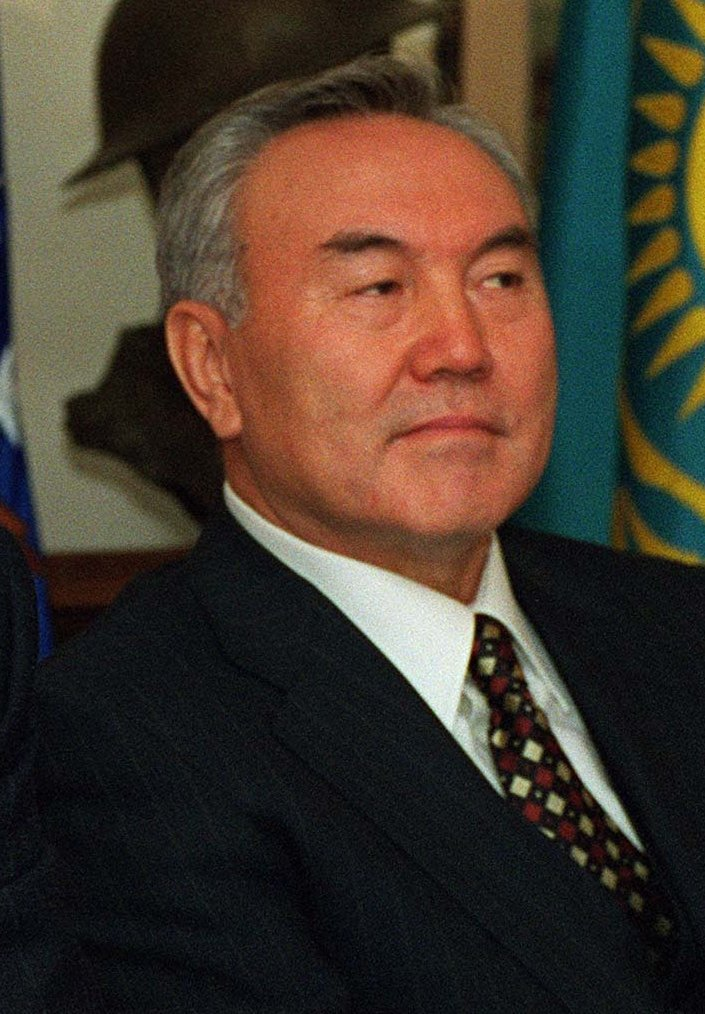
President Nursultan Nazarbayev, who led Nur Otan from its foundation in 1999 until 2022

==== 1999–2006: Growth and consolidation ====
The Otan for the first time participated in the 1999 legislative elections, with 54 candidates from single-member districts and 18 from the party-list for the Mäjilis. The party won a minority of 23 out of 77 seats with 30.9% of the vote with a majority of independents and political associates whom were affiliated with the party's parliamentary group. On 14 December 1999, the Bureau of the Mäjilis registered the Otan parliamentary group with 39 MP's, which included 13 Senators, 26 Mäjilis members. By the decree of the party's Bureau of the Political Council, Quanyşbek Böltaev was approved as the head of the faction, and Urazalinov Sh.A. as the deputy. In the run-up to previous elections, Otan usually received a majority of domestic media coverage. Before the 1999 legislative elections, for example, it was reported that Otan was the main focus in almost 60% of the coverage.

On 20 April 2001, at the 3rd Ordinary Congress, Nazarbayev summarised the results of the party's work telling that "the party has gained good work experience and over the past years has shown that it lives up to its name and can work to strengthen statehood, to consolidate society, to protect the interests of citizens."

At the 4th Extraordinary Congress held on 9 November 2002, the amendments and additions were made to the Otan's party charter, program for the development of small and medium-sized businesses for 2003–2005 was approved. Nazarbayev proclaimed three main themes of the congress agenda of which were: problems of political modernization, improvement of the political system–issues of further development of the economy and, accordingly, the solution of social programs–issues of security of the individual, society, the state. Nazarbayev proposed that the Otan should be a centrist party with social democratic platform to which he praised it as a "creative potential, advocating a state with a socially oriented market economy, with high social stability and a developed social infrastructure." From there, the People's Cooperative Party of Kazakhstan and Republican Political Party of Labour merged with Otan. By that time, the Otan had already 7,000 primary party organizations in all 206 district and city offices and 16 branches. 1,660 party members became members of regional, city and district mäslihats (local assemblies).

In 2003, 2,240 members of the Otan were elected to mäslihats (local assemblies) of all levels. Having an overwhelming majority in the representative bodies of power at all levels, the party gained its opportunity to influence the socio-economic policy of the state by region.

At the Otan's congress held on 15 June 2004, Nursultan Nazarbayev proclaimed that the "unity is the main condition for prosperity of our people and state." and with the Otan claiming that the party representatives made up only six percent of the total 1,755 candidates that were nominated for the 2004 legislative elections. In the 2004 Kazakh legislative election, the party won 60.6% of the popular vote and 42 out of 77 seats with 35 being from single-member districts, becoming a majority in the Mäjilis. Zharmakhan Tuyakbay, Chairman of the Mazhilis and a party loyalist renounced his Otan membership and resigned from post as the Mazhilis Chairman after criticising the government of rigging the elections in favour of the party. Tuyakbay eventually joined the opposition and would lead For a Just Kazakhstan alliance by running against Nazarbayev in the 2005 presidential election.

On 9 September 2005, the 8th Otan Extraordinary Congress was held with the participation of the party leader and head of state Nursultan Nazarbayev. For the first time, the delegates nominated Nazarbayev as a candidate for presidency. The party intended to unite all the constructive civic forces within the country on the platform of support for Nazarbayev and provide him with new opportunities to complete political reforms. The Otan pledged to implement the initiatives set by Nazarbayev of which were reviving the rural villages, developing agricultural production, domestic industry, small and medium-sized businesses.

Nur Otan headquarters in Astana

The Otan merged with Dariga Nazarbayeva's Asar on 4 July 2006, increasing the party's seats by 4 to 46 out of 77. After the merged party was formed, Nazarbayev remarked to his daughter "Tell your Asar members that... you are returning to your father." Dariga, on 19 June 2006, said that all pro-presidential parties should combine to create a grouping "with which no other party will be able to compete in the next 50 years."

In November 2006, it was announced that the Civic Party and the Agrarian Party would follow in Asar's path and also merge with Otan to increase the party's share of MP's from 46 to 57 seats out of 77. Nazarbayev said he expected other parties to merge with Otan. Nazarbayev said there should be fewer, stronger parties that "efficiently defend the interests of the population." At the subsequent party congress on 22 December 2006, delegates voted to rename Otan into the "Nur Otan" People's Democratic Party (Kazakh: «Нұр Отан» Халықтық демократиялық партиясы; Russian: Народно-демократическая партия «Нур Отан»).

==== 2006–2013: Rebranding and further developments ====
On 4 July 2007, at the 11th Nur Otan Extraordinary Congress, Nazarbayev declared himself as sole leader of the party. This came after the dissolution of the 3rd Mazhilis in June 2007 and amendments to the Constitution of Kazakhstan, which removed limit on president's activities with political parties during his term of office. At the congress, Baqytjan Jumagulov became the First Deputy Chairman while Kairat Kelimbetov and Sergey Gromov were elected as deputy chairmen and the amendments to the Constitution which changed Kazakhstan's electoral system, the Nur Otan presented 127 persons in the party-list which were scheduled to be elected for the first time through proportional representation. In the August 2007 legislative elections, the Nur Otan won 88.1% of the vote and all the contested seats, making it the highest share for the party in history while other parties were unable pass the 7% electoral threshold, thus leaving the Nur Otan to have a sole party representation in the Parliament. This made the party become a central factor in the political decision-making process within the government, being compared to the Communist Party of the Soviet Union by the opposition.

In 2008, the Nur Otan formed its youth wing named Jas Otan and that same year in February, the party signed a cooperation agreement with the Agency of Combating Economic and Corruption Crime to which according to First Deputy Chairman Adilbek Zhaksybekov: "The public councils will influence through the media, through methods of public influence, so that cases brought for corruption offences are brought to an end." Just one month later on 3 March 2008, the Nur Otan Republican Public Anti-Corruption Council was formed, which was an advisory body under the party aimed at fighting corruption.

At the Nur Otan Anti-Corruption Forum held on 6 November 2008, Nazarbayev proposed the creation of the Committee of Party Control which would provide public support and help the Nur Otan fight the corruption. He also called for the party to cooperate with non-government organisations (NGOs) and that the Nur Otan should keep issues of corruption in the health and justice system on the stand. That same day, changes took place within the party. Boran Raqymbekov was appointed as the chairman of the party's control committee, while new secretary posts were formed for the Nur Otan organisational and mass work with Sergey Gromov and Erlan Karin being appointed as the secretaries.

On 15 May 2009, the 12th Nur Otan Extraordinary Congress was held, from there Nazarbayev presented a plan for the nation to recover from the Great Recession and urged for the party members to develop Innovative development, raise the standard of living, and stability in society. He also called for a diversification within the economy, claiming that the agricultural sector would make great contributation to the cause. The congress also addressed the issues of improving the system of government, combating corruption and improving the efficiency of the party itself.

In May 2010, a Higher Party School was formed under the party, which aimed at improving the party's political studies.

At the 14th Extraordinary Congress held on 25 November 2011, the party unveiled its electoral platform called the "Kazakhstan 2017 Goals National Plan of Action". At the congress, Nazarbayev stated that "in the 21st century only strong states can develop successfully. As the political leadership party Nur Otan, it takes responsibility for the future of the country, the stability of society and the continuity of the political course in the coming decades." After the 2007 elections, the Nur Otan received backlash amongst opposition and international organisations. This eventually led to the Parliament, which the Nur Otan controlled, to pass an amendment that would guarantee for the opposing party to have a mandate in the Mazhilis whether it reaches the required 7% electoral threshold or not, with lawmakers from the Nur Otan itself who called for a multi-party system. The Nur Otan at the 2012 legislative election swept 80.9% of the vote, winning a supermajority of 83 out of 98 seats, although suffering its worst loss of 15 seats in comparison to 2007. Two parties: the Ak Zhol Democratic Party and Communist People's Party of Kazakhstan gained its presence in the Parliament, although they were viewed as loyal to the government.

==== 2013–2022: Political and economic reforms ====
Logo used from 2019 to 2022

On 17–18 October 2013, at the 15th Nur Otan Extraordinary Congress in Astana of which was attended by 1,200 delegates representing all regional branches of the party and more than a 1,000 guests. The Nur Otan presented its doctrine to which called for evolutionary development and to build a democratic, prosperous, competitive and socially oriented state where every motivated, law-abiding and hard-working citizen would benefit himself and society. At the congress, a decision was made to adopt a new full name for the party as simply "Nur Otan", removing the "People's Democratic" wording in which First Deputy Chairman Bauyrjan Baibek argued that political parties do not put "ideological affiliation" in their name as basis for "international practice".

At the Nur Otan Political Council meeting on 11 November 2014, Nazarbayev addressed the nation on the Nurly Jol economic plan and an Anti-Corruption Program for 2015–2025 was adopted to which according to Baibek noted that the main indicator for the effectiveness of the program would be Kazakhstan's entry into the world's top 30 most developed economies.

On 11 March 2015, at the 16th Ordinary Congress held at the Palace of Independence, around 1,200 delegates took part in which for the first time more than 20% of them were heads of primary party organizations. At the congress, the participants discussed the issues in the results of works by the Political Council, Central Control, Audit Commission as well as the candidacy nomination for the 2015 presidential election. Nazarbayev for the last time became a presidential nominee for the Nur Otan and at the congress, put forward his proposed five institutional reforms in response to the economic challenges which were the formation of a modern, professional and autonomous state apparatus; ensuring the rule of law; industrialization and economic growth based on diversification; a nation of a common future; and a transparent and accountable state. Nazarbayev insisted that his proposals would strengthen the country and its entry into the top 30 developed countries of the world. In the presidential elections, Nazarbayev would go on to officially sweep 97.7% of the vote.

Following the announcement of the 2016 legislative elections, the 17th Nur Otan Extraordinary Congress took place on 29 January 2016 which Nazarbayev proclaimed it as a "historical moment", reflecting his 17-year chairmanship of the party where he claimed that it become a "basis for concrete achievements of our economy, state and society". At the congress, a party list and the Kazakhstan-2021: Unity. Stability. Creation electoral programme were approved in which Nazarbayev outlined its key areas of anti-crisis stabilization; structural modernization of the economy; new standards of quality of life for Kazakh citizens; constitutional patriotism; regional stability, integration and security. In the aftermath of 2016 legislative elections, the Nur Otan won an extra seat and 82.2% of the vote, a margin slightly more than compared to 2012 from which Nazarbayev called it "a great accomplishment of our democracy." Nazarbayev's daughter, Dariga, became an MP from the party list which fueled speculations in regard to potential political succession.

On 3 November 2017, an expanded meeting of the Political Council was held from where Nazarbayev noted the Nur Otan's role in the constitutional reforms, insisting that the party should "become not just a tribune for explaining the meaning of the reform, but also be its active guide at all levels". During the meeting, the party discussed its results from activities for the first 10 months of 2017 and made changes to its composition in the Bureau of the Political Council. National Security Committee chairman Karim Massimov was removed from the council membership, which according to the Nur Otan secretary Qanybek Jūmaşev, was due to the party's charter where it forbids persons to work in the law enforcement system and have membership to the party simultaneously. Massimov was replaced by Presidential Administration head Adilbek Zhaksybekov who was supported unanimously.

=== Tokayev leadership ===
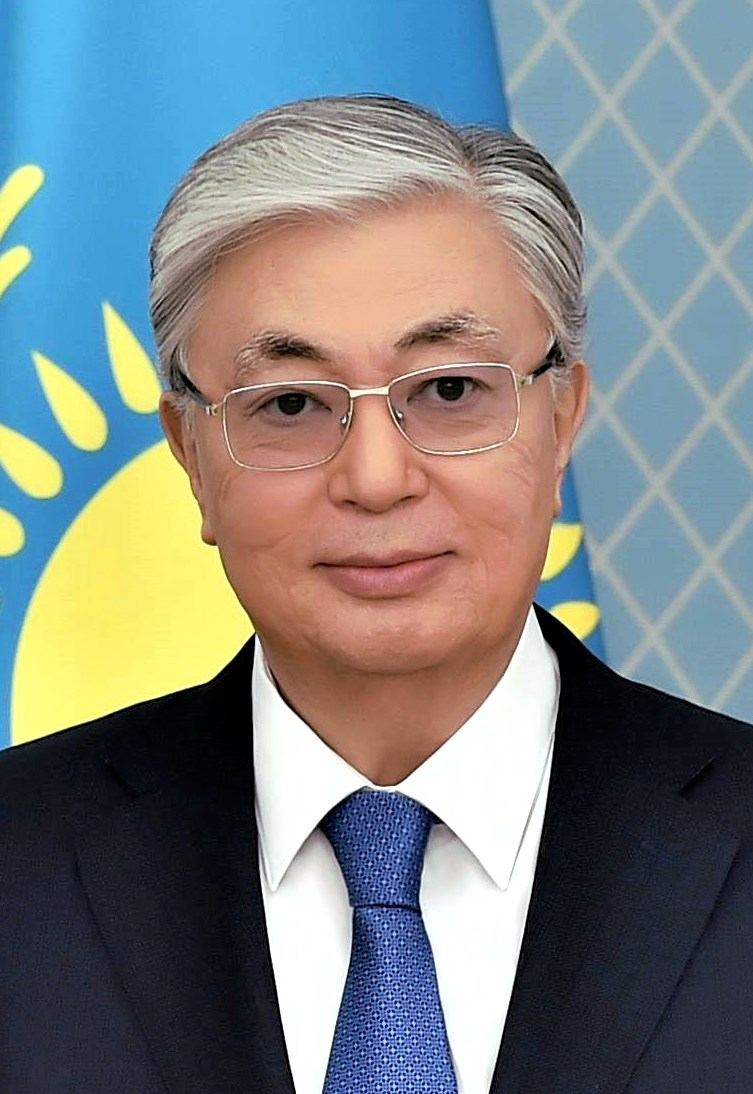
President Kassym-Jomart Tokayev in 2020, who led Nur Otan, now Amanat, from January 2022 until April 2022

On 28 January 2022, at the 21st Extraordinary Congress of Nur Otan, the party underwent a leadership transition as Kassym-Jomart Tokayev was unanimously elected chairman, succeeding Nursultan Nazarbayev, who had led the party since its founding in 1999. The transition was endorsed by Nazarbayev and marked a shift in the party’s direction. Addressing the congress, Tokayev outlined key priorities aimed at revitalizing the party’s role in governance, including reinforcing national unity, enhancing ideological engagement, restructuring the party's faction presence in the Mäjilis, tackling socio-economic challenges, strengthening public outreach, and intensifying anti-corruption efforts. He also signaled the possibility of stepping down as chairman later in the year, citing the importance of presidential impartiality in political affairs.

Following this transition, several key changes took place within the party's political structure. On 1 February 2022, Nurlan Nigmatullin resigned from his position as chairman of the Mäjilis, a role he had held since 2016. Additionally, on 25 February 2022, Dariga Nazarbayeva, the daughter of Nazarbayev, stepped down from her parliamentary mandate.

At the 22nd Extraordinary Congress of Nur Otan, held on 1 March 2022, Tokayev supported a proposal by Erlan Qoşanov to rename the party to Amanat. During the congress, Tokayev emphasized the need to decentralize party structures, enhance direct voter engagement, shift focus from populist rhetoric to addressing concrete social issues, and launch new citizen-driven policy initiatives to strengthen Kazakhstan's political stability amid global uncertainties. A significant outcome of the congress was the removal of Nurlan Nigmatullin from the Amanat Political Council, following his earlier resignation as chairman of the Mäjilis.

=== Qoşanov leadership ===
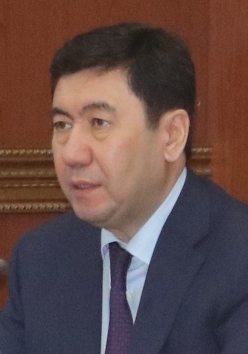
Chairman Erlan Qoşanov, who has led Amanat from April 2022

On 26 April 2022, at the 23rd Extraordinary Congress of Amanat, Tokayev formally resigned from his position as party chairman and withdrew from membership, reinforcing his commitment to presidential neutrality and emphasized that the president should not be affiliated with any political party, which he believed would promote fairness and ensure equal opportunities for all political forces. Tokayev's resignation followed significant changes within the party, including the merger of the Adal party with Amanat. In his speech at the congress, Tokayev expressed confidence that Amanat would remain pivotal in Kazakhstan's political life without his leadership, nominating Erlan Qoşanov, Chairman of the Mäjilis, as his successor due to his extensive experience and leadership capabilities, with the congress delegates unanimously approving his candidacy.

After taking over as chairman of Amanat, Qoşanov highlighted the intensified political competition following Tokayev's departure from the party, stressing that the party's responsibility lies in addressing societal issues and resolving citizens' concerns to achieve electoral success. He reaffirmed the party's commitment to supporting President Tokayev's reforms, focusing on political, economic, and social changes to improve citizens' lives and increase competition in various sectors. Qoşanov emphasized the need for clear roadmaps and regional targets to implement the election program, while ensuring Amanat's active role in building a New Kazakhstan and combating bureaucracy for meaningful progress.

==== Dissolution and merger into Ädilet ====
Following the registration of the Ädilet party in June 2026, Amanat's leadership expressed support for the consolidation of pro-presidential political forces around the reform agenda of president Tokayev and the implementation of the new constitution. At a meeting of the party's political council on 6 June 2026, members endorsed political unification with Ädilet.

At the 26th Extraordinary Congress on 12 June 2026, attended by more than 1,500 delegates, including members of the political council, members of parliament, representatives of the party’s youth wing Jastar Ruhy, and delegates from all regions of Kazakhstan, Qoşanov proposed merging Amanat with the newly formed Ädilet party, stating that the country required "new points of unification" rather than new political divisions. He also noted that, despite recent changes, "associations about the party's past" persisted in public perception, and said Amanat had entered a new stage of development, with greater national unity and cohesion required. Delegates subsequently voted to dissolve the party and merge it into Ädilet. Party leaders described the decision as a means of consolidating political forces in support of the country's reform programme.

The merger was subsequently ratified at the 2nd Ädilet Ordinary Congress on 14 June, which delegates accepted Amanat and its membership into the new party, formally completing the unification process. Ädilet chairman Aibek Dädebay described the merger as "a wise decision based on national responsibility, which takes precedence over narrow party interests".

== Organisation ==
The party operated based on principles like voluntariness, equality, self-government, legality, and transparency, with its mission and values outlined in the political platform.

=== Membership ===
Membership in Amanat was voluntary, open to Kazakh citizens aged 18 and over who met the party's requirements, participated in its activities, and paid dues. Members could not belong to other political parties, and admission was decided by local or higher party organizations based on written applications. Membership could have been terminated for reasons such as voluntary withdrawal, legal issues, or actions harmful to the party's interests, with penalties ranging from warnings to expulsion. Members had the right to participate in party activities, voice opinions, and appeal decisions. They must have adhered to the party's charter, have actively supported its goals, paid dues, and attended meetings.

As of 1 January 2018, the Amanat party reported to have had 1,016,540 members, a significant growth from 164,041 in 2000.

The party's membership demographics were predominantly female, with 63.8% women and 36.2% men. In terms of age, 17% of members were under 30, 26.7% were between 30 and 40, and 23.6% were aged 41 to 50. Older members, aged 51 to 60, made up 20.1%, and 12.6% were over 60. Ethnically, 77.3% of the members were Kazakh, followed by 14.6% Russians, and smaller groups of Ukrainians (1.9%), Uzbeks (1.4%), Germans (0.8%), Tatars (0.8%), and others (3.2%). Regarding education, 52.7% held higher education, 25.1% were middle professionals, and 22.2% had middle-level education. Professionally, 29.5% worked in education, science, and culture, 24% in industry and services, and 4.6% in state bodies. Other sectors included healthcare (7.9%), agriculture (1.5%), small and medium business (4.1%), and college students (2.4%). Additionally, 14.1% were pensioners, 1.3% were disabled, and 10.6% belonged to other professions.

=== International partnership ===
Despite not being affiliated with any political international, Amanat had signed and renewed numerous cooperation agreements with other political parties worldwide. In October 2011, one was signed in Astana between Amanat and the Ukrainian Party of Regions, and another in 2015 with United Russia.

Party	Country	Date of established cooperation
United Russia	Russia	12 June 2004
Chinese Communist Party	China	22 June 2009
Justice and Development Party	Turkey	21 October 2009
Party of Regions	Ukraine	24 November 2011
People's Democratic Party	Tajikistan	22 April 2014

=== Jastar Ruhy ===
Jastar Ruhy is a youth wing of the Amanat party, bringing together over 100,000 young people with a focus on hard work, knowledge, and civic engagement. Originally known as Jas Otan from 2008 to 2022, the organization was renamed on 12 July 2022 following the previous rebranding of the Nur Otan party as Amanat. It began as a volunteer movement and has since grown into one of the largest youth organizations in Kazakhstan. Over time, Jastar Ruhy has been involved in shaping youth policy and has participated in various social, environmental, patriotic, and cultural initiatives, as well as charitable projects. The organization seeks to engage young people across different regions, advocate for their rights and interests, and provide opportunities for public participation and discussion.

=== Academy of Political Management ===
The Amanat Party Academy of Political Management, originally established as the Nur Otan Higher Party School in 2010, was founded following a proposal by President Nursultan Nazarbayev to improve the professionalism of party members. Its primary goal was to enhance the qualifications of party managers through additional education programs. The school initially opened regional branches in Aktobe, Almaty, and Semey in 2010–2011 to expand political education.

In 2013, the school was reorganized and renamed the Nur Otan Party School of Political Management, with updated objectives and methods. Since 2016, the shift to distance learning formats led to the closure of regional branches, and the school began offering 3-level training programs targeting party members at central, regional, and territorial levels.

On 18 May 2022, following a directive from President Kassym-Jomart Tokayev, the school was re-registered as the Amanat Party Academy of Political Management. The Academy began offering new training programs for various groups, including rural akims, women leaders, young politicians, and maslihat deputies.

=== Amanat Media Group ===
The Amanat Media Group, originally established as Nur Media on 25 November 2008 by the Amanat party, was one of Kazakhstan's largest media companies. Initially founded in partnership with the Samruk-Kazyna fund, the company grew to manage various media assets, including Astana TV, Aiqyn, Liter, Türkistan newspapers, and NS and ORDA FM radio stations. With a team of 400 journalists working nationwide, the group focused on expanding its media presence while producing exclusive and relevant content.

=== Institute of Public Policy ===
The Institute of Public Policy, established in June 2016, served as an analytical center for the Amanat party. It conducted research on socio-political and economic trends, monitored public sentiment, and assessed the effectiveness of government agencies in implementing strategic initiatives. The E-Analytics system supported nationwide sociological research, enhancing data-driven decision-making. The institute also facilitated feedback between the state, the party, and the public, while providing expert analysis for party activities. It aimed to be a key source of analytical insights and innovative policy approaches for Amanat.

== Leadership ==
=== Party congress ===
The Congress served as the supreme governing entity of the party; its legitimacy was established when all party branches were represented, with delegates elected primarily at regional branch conferences or, in certain situations, appointed by the chairman during political council meetings; during its sessions, decisions were made by a majority vote encompassing representatives from all party branches, and an extraordinary congress could be called upon the decision of the political council, the chairman, or upon the initiative of a significant majority of regional branches.

The party congress was mandated to convene at least once every four years, either by the party chairman or the political council. It possessed the authoritative mandate to address and resolve all matters concerning the party's operations, with its exclusive purview encompassing pivotal tasks such as the adoption and modification of the party's charter, program, and associated documents; the election and removal of the Party Chairman; the appointment and removal of members from the political council and central control and auditing commission; the endorsement of party members for key political positions and the adjustment of electoral lists; oversight through receiving reports from the political council and the central control and auditing commission on inter-congress activities; the establishment, structure, and dissolution protocols for party governing bodies; endorsement of audit regulations; decisions regarding party reorganization or dissolution; and setting the membership fee structures.

=== Chairman ===
The Chairman of the Party held the paramount leadership position, overseeing general management and presiding over the party congress, directing the political council and its bureau while proposing key nominations for presidential and parliamentary candidates; further responsibilities encompass appointing and dismissing party officials, coordinating with the party's parliamentary faction, ensuring the party's growth, discipline, and personnel policy, making decisions on organizational structures, representing the party domestically and internationally, issuing necessary powers of attorney, endorsing resolutions, and addressing activities outside the exclusive purview of the party congress, with additional rights including the initiation of motion of no confidence against the government and adherence to legal and party charter mandates.

Since the party's creation in 1999, the role of Executive Secretary evolved, preceded historically by the positions of the first deputy chairman and acting chairman; toward the end of the party's life, the chairman possessed the authority to delegate powers to the Executive Secretary, encompassing responsibilities such as managing party activities, coordinating parliamentary faction work, approving party regulations and budgets, awarding party accolades, overseeing personnel matters, chairing key meetings, making decisions aligned with the party charter, and other functions, ensuring seamless operational continuity and effective governance.

No.	Portrait	Name (birth–death)	Took office	Left office	Term length	Election	Acting	Took office	Left office
1.		Nursultan Nazarbayev (born 1940)	1 March 1999	28 January 2022	22 years, 333 days	1999	Sergey Tereshchenko	1 March 1999	21 October 2002
1.		Nursultan Nazarbayev (born 1940)	1 March 1999	28 January 2022	22 years, 333 days	1999	Amangeldı Ermegiaev	21 October 2002	12 March 2004
1.		Nursultan Nazarbayev (born 1940)	1 March 1999	28 January 2022	22 years, 333 days	1999	Baqytjan Jumagulov	18 April 2005	4 July 2007
1.		Nursultan Nazarbayev (born 1940)	1 March 1999	28 January 2022	22 years, 333 days	1999	Deputy	Took office	Left office
1.		Nursultan Nazarbayev (born 1940)	1 March 1999	28 January 2022	22 years, 333 days	1999	Zharmakhan Tuyakbay	12 March 2004	18 October 2004
1.		Nursultan Nazarbayev (born 1940)	1 March 1999	28 January 2022	22 years, 333 days	1999	Aleksandr Pavlov	12 March 2004	4 July 2006
1.		Nursultan Nazarbayev (born 1940)	1 March 1999	28 January 2022	22 years, 333 days	1999	Amangeldı Ermegiaev	12 March 2004	4 July 2007
1.		Nursultan Nazarbayev (born 1940)	1 March 1999	28 January 2022	22 years, 333 days	1999	First Deputy	Took office	Left office
1.		Nursultan Nazarbayev (born 1940)	1 March 1999	28 January 2022	22 years, 333 days	1999	Baqytjan Jumagulov	4 July 2007	23 January 2008
1.		Nursultan Nazarbayev (born 1940)	1 March 1999	28 January 2022	22 years, 333 days	1999	Adilbek Jaqsybekov	23 January 2008	13 October 2008
1.		Nursultan Nazarbayev (born 1940)	1 March 1999	28 January 2022	22 years, 333 days	1999	Darhan Kaletaev	13 October 2008	19 November 2009
1.		Nursultan Nazarbayev (born 1940)	1 March 1999	28 January 2022	22 years, 333 days	1999	Nurlan Nigmatulin	19 November 2009	24 September 2012
1.		Nursultan Nazarbayev (born 1940)	1 March 1999	28 January 2022	22 years, 333 days	1999	Baqytjan Sagyntaev	24 September 2012	16 January 2013
1.		Nursultan Nazarbayev (born 1940)	1 March 1999	28 January 2022	22 years, 333 days	1999	Bauyrjan Baibek	16 January 2013	8 August 2015
1.		Nursultan Nazarbayev (born 1940)	1 March 1999	28 January 2022	22 years, 333 days	1999	Asqar Myrzahmetov	8 August 2015	6 May 2016
1.		Nursultan Nazarbayev (born 1940)	1 March 1999	28 January 2022	22 years, 333 days	1999	Muqtar Qul-Muhammed	6 May 2016	1 February 2018
1.		Nursultan Nazarbayev (born 1940)	1 March 1999	28 January 2022	22 years, 333 days	1999	Mäulen Äşimbaev	1 February 2018	29 June 2019
2.		Kassym-Jomart Tokayev (born 1953)	28 January 2022	26 April 2022	88 days	2022	Executive Secretary	Took office	Left office
2.		Kassym-Jomart Tokayev (born 1953)	28 January 2022	26 April 2022	88 days	2022	Bauyrjan Baibek	29 June 2019	2 February 2022
2.		Kassym-Jomart Tokayev (born 1953)	28 January 2022	26 April 2022	88 days	2022	Ashat Oralov	2 February 2022	26 April 2022
3.		Erlan Qoşanov (born 1963)	26 April 2022	12 June 2026	4 years, 137 days	2022	Executive Secretary	Took office	Left office
3.		Erlan Qoşanov (born 1963)	26 April 2022	12 June 2026	4 years, 137 days	2022	Ashat Oralov	26 April 2022	4 January 2023
3.		Erlan Qoşanov (born 1963)	26 April 2022	12 June 2026	4 years, 137 days	2022	Elnur Beisenbayev	4 January 2023	12 June 2026

=== Political Council ===
The Political Council, serving as the supreme representative body, played a pivotal role in guiding the party's strategic direction, encompassing tasks such as delineating activity directions in line with party congress decisions, overseeing party participation in election campaigns, sanctioning primary election rules, formulating and endorsing political statements, defining the party's stance on emerging societal issues, electing its Bureau members upon the chairman's proposal, orchestrating party congresses and intra-party discussions, and addressing other pertinent matters within its jurisdiction, while also possessing the discretion to delegate specific issues to its Bureau for further deliberation.

=== Bureau of the Political Council ===
The Bureau of the Political Council served as a central managerial entity responsible for overseeing party operations between congresses and Political Council meetings, ensuring the implementation of decisions made by higher party bodies, addressing significant socio-economic and political matters of the republic, managing deputy mandates distribution, evaluating reports from party branches and parliamentary factions, expressing the party's stance on public affairs, convening crucial meetings, proposing candidate nominations for legislative bodies, establishing and overseeing deputy factions, determining personnel strategies, approving candidate lists for local representatives, endorsing party documents and awards, addressing membership terminations and appeals, forming specialized commissions, and making pivotal decisions on the party's organizational structure, penalties, and participation in legal entities, while also possessing the authority to rescind decisions conflicting with higher party mandates.

=== Central Office ===
The Central Office serves as the coordinating hub for the party's structural subdivisions and branches, offering comprehensive support encompassing information, analysis, organizational logistics, and legal assistance while ensuring the implementation of directives from the chairman, executive secretary, and other party leadership; its operational guidelines and staffing decisions are set by the Executive Secretary, who also oversees employment matters in compliance with Kazakh labour and social security regulations.

== Ideology ==
The Amanat party positioned itself as a "party of people" committed to the development of Kazakhstan as a democratic, economically strong, and secular state.

The Amanat party was often described as a "big tent party", encompassing a broad spectrum of political views under its umbrella. The party officially had a centrist ideology, with a blend of liberalism, social conservatism, and elements of social democracy. It supported significant emphasis on youth empowerment, encouraging their integration into the social and economic spheres. Amanat also sought to advance anti-corruption initiatives, focusing on the promotion of public control over governmental activities and encouraging greater civic participation.

Amanat's core values were encapsulated in its 2013 doctrine that defines the party as "the dominant political force that consolidates society and ensures the implementation of the state course of Elbasy", which underscores national sovereignty, self-determination, stability, and the creation of a strong middle class. It is dedicated to preserving Kazakhstan's family values and cultural identity, including the promotion of the Kazakh language, while respecting the diverse ethnic groups that make up the country.

In terms of economic and environmental policies, the party emphasized economic diversification, the protection of private property, and the adoption of energy-efficient technologies. It also focused on ensuring that social assistance reaches vulnerable groups within society. On the international stage, Amanat followed a Multi-Vector Policy, seeking to balance Kazakhstan's interests across a broad range of international relationships, positioning the country as an active global participant.

== Election results ==
=== Presidential elections ===
Election	Party candidate	Votes	%	Result
2005	Nursultan Nazarbayev	6,147,517	91.15%	Elected ✓
2011	Nursultan Nazarbayev	7,850,958	95.55%	Elected ✓
2015	Nursultan Nazarbayev	8,833,250	97.75%	Elected ✓
2019	Kassym-Jomart Tokayev	6,504,024	70.76%	Elected ✓
2022	Endorsed Kassym-Jomart Tokayev	6,456,392	81.31%	Elected ✓

=== Mazhilis elections ===
Election	Leader	Votes	%	Seats	+/–	Position	Result
1999	Nursultan Nazarbayev	1,622,895	30.90%	23 / 77	New	1st	Minority government
2004	Nursultan Nazarbayev	5,621,436	60.60%	42 / 77	▲19	1st	Majority government
2007	Nursultan Nazarbayev	5,247,720	88.40%	98 / 107	▲46	1st	Supermajority government
2012	Nursultan Nazarbayev	5,621,436	80.99%	83 / 107	▼15	1st	Supermajority government
2016	Nursultan Nazarbayev	6,183,757	82.20%	84 / 107	▲1	1st	Supermajority government
2021	Nursultan Nazarbayev	5,148,074	71.09%	76 / 107	▼8	1st	Supermajority government
2023	Erlan Qoşanov	3,431,510	53.90%	62 / 98	▼14	1st	Majority government

=== Party leadership elections ===
Election	Party candidate	Votes	%	Result
1999	Nursultan Nazarbayev	385	100.00%	Elected ✓
2022	Kassym-Jomart Tokayev	389	100.00%	Elected ✓
2022	Erlan Qoşanov	—N/a	—N/a	Elected by acclamation ✓

== See also ==
- Zhas Otan
