= Kostanay Regional Mäslihat =

Unicameral local legislature of Kazakhstan

Kostanay Regional Mäslihat Костанай облыстық мәслихаты
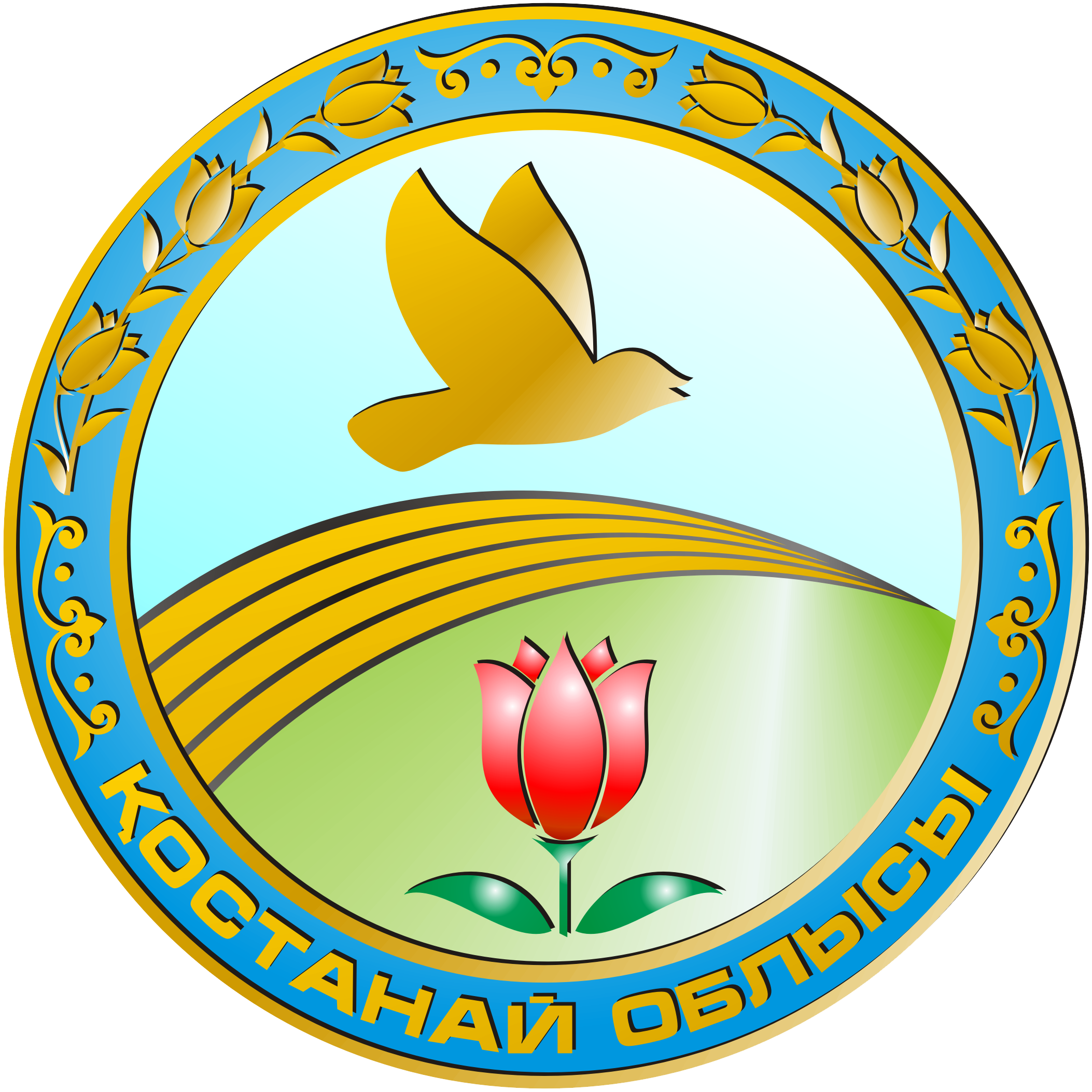

Type
- Type: Unicameral

History
- Founded: 10 December 1993

Leadership
- Secretary: Sailaubek Eşanov, Nur Otan since 15 January 2012

Structure
- Seats: 33
- Political groups: Majority (27); Nur Otan (27); Opposition (6); Ak Zhol (3); Auyl (3)
- Length of term: 5 years

Elections
- Voting system: Party-list proportional representation Largest remainder method
- Last election: 10 January 2021
- Next election: 2026

Website
- maslikhat.kostanay.gov.kz

The Kostanay Regional Mäslihat (Kazakh: Қостанай облыстық мәслихаты, romanized: Qostanai oblystyq mäslihaty) is a unicameral legislative body of the Kostanay Region which was formed in 1993.

Convening in the region administrative center of Kostanay, the Mäslihat consists of 33 members of three parties in which the Nur Otan (NO) controls the supermajority of 27 seats. The Mäslihat is in charge of implementing local policies to the interests of the general public of the region with accordance of the legislation of Kazakhstan such as the approval of plans, economic and social programs for the development of the region of the local budget and reporting its implementation, including budget programs.

Since January 2012, Sailaubek Eşanov (NO) has been serving as the Mäslihat's Secretary.

== History ==
On 7 March 1994, the first elections to the Kustanay Regional Mäslihat-Meeting of Deputies were held where members were elected through a secret ballot in a five-year term after the enactment of the law in December 1993 (where local councils were reformed into maslihats). In 1st Convocation term from 1994 to 1999, a total of 63 members of the Regional Mäslihat served their posts. During that period, the region was renamed into Kostanay and became merged with abolished Turgay Region on 17 June 1997 as a result of changes that were implemented by a Presidential Decree, making the Regional Mäslihat body adopted the newly changed name.

At the 2021 Kostanay Regional Mäslihat election, three parties gain seats with Nur Otan (NO) sweeping a majority of 27 followed by the Ak Zhol Democratic Party (AJ) and Auyl People's Democratic Patriotic Party (AUYL) whom each earned three seats. The result of electoral changes occurred in the aftermath of the newly enacted law in 2018 when the centralised Kazakh Parliament approved of a bill that would allow for local legislative bodies to allocate its seats through party-list proportional representation.

== Powers and functions ==
In accordance with the Article 20 of the Constitution of Kazakhstan "On local government and self-government in the Republic of Kazakhstan"

- A member of a mäslihat expresses the will of the population of the corresponding administrative-territorial units, taking into account national interests.
- The powers of a member of a mäslihat begin from the moment of his registration as a deputy of a mäslihat by the relevant territorial election commission and terminate from the moment of termination of the powers of a mäslihat.
- The powers of a deputy of a mäslihat shall be terminated ahead of schedule in the following cases:
1. Election or appointment of a deputy to a position, the occupation of which, in accordance with the legislation of the Republic of Kazakhstan, is incompatible with the performance of deputy duties;
2. Entry into legal force of a court decision on the recognition of a member incapacitated or partially incapacitated;
3. Termination of powers of mäslihat;
4. Death of a member by entry into force of a court declaration
5. Termination of his citizenship of the Republic of Kazakhstan;
6. Entry into legal force of the court's conviction against the deputy;
7. Leaving for permanent residence outside the relevant administrative-territorial unit;
8. In connection with the personal resignation of the deputy;
9. Systematic failure of a deputy to fulfill his duties, including absence without good reason at plenary sessions of the mäslihat session or meetings of the mäslihat bodies to which he was elected, more than three times in a row.
- The decision on the early termination of the powers of a deputy is made at a session of the mäslihat by a majority of votes from the total number of present deputies upon the presentation of the relevant territorial election commission.
- Members of mäslihats who carry out their activities on a permanent or vacant basis, paid from the state budget, are not entitled to carry out entrepreneurial activities, independently participate in the management of an economic entity, engage in other paid activities, except for pedagogical, scientific or other creative.

== Composition ==
The last election for the Kostanay Regional Mäslihat was held on 10 January 2021.

| Party | Seats |
|---|---|
| Nur Otan (NO) | 27 / 33 |
| Ak Zhol Democratic Party (AJ) | 3 / 33 |
| Auyl People's Democratic Patriotic Party (AUYL) | 3 / 33 |

== See also ==
- Mäslihat
