= Almaty Regional Mäslihat =

Unicameral local legislature of Kazakhstan

Almaty Regional Mäslihat: Алматы облыстық мәслихаты (Kazakh); Алматинский областной маслихат (Russian)

Type
- Type: Unicameral

History
- Founded: 10 December 1993

Leadership
- Secretary: Janbolat Jorgenbaev, Nur Otan since 15 January 2021

Structure
- Seats: 45
- Political groups: Majority (37); Nur Otan (37); Opposition (8); Auyl (4); People's Party (4)
- Length of term: 5 years

Elections
- Voting system: Party-list proportional representation Largest remainder method
- Last election: 10 January 2021
- Next election: 2026

Website
- almoblmaslihat.gov.kz

The Almaty Regional Mäslihat (Kazakh: Алматы облыстық мәслихаты, romanized: Almaty oblystyq mäslihaty, Russian: Алматинский областной маслихат, romanized: Almatinsky oblastnoy maslikhat) is a local unicameral legislature of the Almaty Region of Kazakhstan, located in Taldıqorğan which currently consists of 45 members. Founded in 1993, the current Secretary of the Mäslihat is Janbolat Jorgenbaev (Nur Otan). Until 2021, all members of the legislature were elected through a secret ballot from every single member districts. For the first time after the 2021 Almaty regional election, the Mäslihat is composed of three political parties with Nur Otan controlling a supermajority of 37 seats.

== History ==
After the Supreme Council of Kazakhstan adopted a law on 10 December 1993 2578-XII "On local representative and executive bodies of the Republic of Kazakhstan" which reformed the local representative bodies into Mäslihats in an attempt of building a "modern democratic form of government". Members of the Regional Mäslihat were elected for the first time on 7 Match 1994 which convened in its first session on 5 April 1994 in the city of Almaty. From there, Ahet Baqtybaev was elected as the Mäslihat's first Secretary.

As a result of a Presidential Decree No. 585 of 14 April 2001 "On the relocation of the regional center of the Almaty region", the location of the Regional Mäslihat was moved from Almaty to Taldıqorğan.

In the aftermath of 2021 Almaty regional elections, 45 members were elected using newly implemented proportional representation which allowed for political parties to form parliamentary groups within the legislature after Nur Otan won a majority of 37 seats, followed by Auyl People's Democratic Patriotic Party and People's Party of Kazakhstan each winning four seats whom formed a parliamentary opposition.

== Elections ==
Mäslihat members are generally up for re-election every 5 years and are elected on the basis of party-list proportional representation with a required 7% electoral threshold to win any seats in the legislature. If only one parties manages to bypass the electoral threshold, then the party win the second highest number of votes is granted enough seats for representation in the mäslihat regardless whether it had passed the threshold or not. A member of the mäslihat may be a citizen of Kazakhstan who has reached 20 years of age and can be a member of only one mäslihat.

== Powers and functions ==
In accordance with the Article 20 of the Constitution of Kazakhstan "On local government and self-government in the Republic of Kazakhstan"

- A member of a mäslihat expresses the will of the population of the corresponding administrative-territorial units, taking into account national interests.
- The powers of a member of a mäslihat begin from the moment of his registration as a deputy of a mäslihat by the relevant territorial election commission and terminate from the moment of termination of the powers of a mäslihat.
- The powers of a member of a mäslihat shall be terminated ahead of schedule in the following cases:
1. Election or appointment of a deputy to a position, the occupation of which, in accordance with the legislation of the Republic of Kazakhstan, is incompatible with the performance of deputy duties;
2. entry into legal force of a court decision on the recognition of a member incapacitated or partially incapacitated;
3. Termination of powers of mäslihat;
4. Death of a member by entry into force of a court declaration;
5. Termination of his citizenship of the Republic of Kazakhstan;
6. Entry into legal force of the court's conviction against the member;
7. Leaving for permanent residence outside the relevant administrative-territorial unit;
8. In connection with the personal resignation of the member;
9. Systematic failure of a member to fulfill his duties, including absence without good reason at plenary sessions of the mäslihat session or meetings of the mäslihat bodies to which he was elected, more than three times in a row;
- The decision on the early termination of the powers of a deputy is made at a session of the mäslihat by a majority of votes from the total number of present deputies upon the presentation of the relevant territorial election commission.
- Members of mäslihats who carry out their activities on a permanent or vacant basis, paid from the state budget, are not entitled to carry out entrepreneurial activities, independently participate in the management of an economic entity, engage in other paid activities, except for pedagogical, scientific or other creative.

== Commissions ==
There are currently six commissions in the Regional Mäslihat of which are:

- Standing Commission on Economy, Budget, Law Enforcement, Anti-Corruption, Parliamentary Powers and Ethics
- Standing Commission on the Development of Industrial and Innovative, Transport and Logistics Infrastructure, Support for Small and Medium-Sized businesses, Tourism and Sports
- Standing Commission on Healthcare, Education, Social Protection of the Population and Culture
- Standing Commission on Religions, Languages, Interethnic Relations, Domestic and Youth Policy
- Standing commission on Housing and Communal Services, Construction
- Standing commission on Agriculture, Land Relations, Veterinary Medicine and Ecology

== Current composition ==
The last election for the Aktobe Region Mäslihat was held on 10 January 2021.

Party	Seats
Nur Otan (NO)	37
Auyl People's Democratic Patriotic Party (AUYL)	4
People's Party of Kazakhstan (QHP)	4

== See also ==
- Mäslihat
- 2021 Almaty regional election
