= Akmola Regional Mäslihat =

Legislature of Akmola Region, Kazakhstan

Akmola Regional Mäslihat Ақмола облыстық мәслихаты

Type
- Type: Unicameral

History
- Founded: 10 December 1993

Leadership
- Chairman: Beibit Jüsipov, Amanat

Structure
- Seats: 32
- Political groups: Party-list voting (16); Amanat (13); Auyl (2); Aq Jol (1); Single-member district voting (16); Independents
- Length of term: 5 years

Elections
- Voting system: Party-list proportional representation (16); Single-member district (16)
- Last election: 19 March 2023
- Next election: 2028

Website
- maslihat.akmol.kz

The Akmola Regional Mäslihat (Kazakh: Ақмола облыстық мәслихаты, romanized: Aqmola oblystyq mäslihaty) is a local unicameral legislature of the Akmola Region which was formed in 1993. Since 2023, half the members are elected through party-list proportional representation and the other are elected independently, without a party's influence through single-member districts. The Mäslihat is elected by the population of the region and are in charge expressing the population's will and, in accordance with Kazakhstani law, deciding the steps needed and monitoring their implementation.

The Regional Mäslihat is currently chaired by Chairman Beibit Jüsipov (Amanat) since 30 March 2023.

== History ==
On 10 December 1993, the Law "On local representative and executive bodies of the Republic of Kazakhstan" was adopted which brought upon a history of local representative bodies of power in Kazakhstan. In March 1994, according to the resolution of the Supreme Council of Kazakhstan, nationwide elections were held and the first convocation of representative bodies was elected, which was called the Mäslihat. From there, 44 members to the Regional Mäslihat were elected and Amangeldı Syzdyqov was chosen as the Mäslihat's first Secretary.

In 2021, elections were held for the first time on the basis of the newly implemented Party-list proportional representation where the Nur Otan won 26 seats in the Regional Mäslihat followed by two parties of Aq Jol Democratic Party and Auyl People's Democratic Patriotic Party, bringing the local body under political factions.

== Elections ==
Mäslihat members are up for re-election every 5 years and half of them are elected through party-list proportional representation (a party needs at least 5% of the whole votes to get one seat) and the other half is elected through single-member districts, independent of party affiliation.

Before the 2023 election, they were elected on the basis of party-list proportional representation with a required 7% electoral threshold to win any seats in the legislature. If only one parties managed to bypass the electoral threshold, then the party would win the second highest number of votes is granted enough seats for representation in the mäslihat regardless whether it had passed the threshold or not. A member of the mäslihat may be a citizen of Kazakhstan who has reached 20 years of age and can be a member of only one mäslihat.

== Powers and functions ==
In accordance with the Article 20 of the Constitution of Kazakhstan "On local government and self-government in the Republic of Kazakhstan":

- A member of a mäslihat expresses the will of the population of the corresponding administrative-territorial units, taking into account national interests.
- The powers of a member of a mäslihat begin from the moment of his registration as a deputy of a mäslihat by the relevant territorial election commission and terminate from the moment of termination of the powers of a mäslihat.
- The powers of a member of a mäslihat shall be terminated ahead of schedule in the following cases:
1. Election or appointment of a deputy to a position, the occupation of which, in accordance with the legislation of the Republic of Kazakhstan, is incompatible with the performance of deputy duties;
2. entry into legal force of a court decision on the recognition of a member incapacitated or partially incapacitated;
3. Termination of powers of mäslihat;
4. Death of a member by entry into force of a court declaration;
5. Termination of his citizenship of the Republic of Kazakhstan;
6. Entry into legal force of the court's conviction against the member;
7. Leaving for permanent residence outside the relevant administrative-territorial unit;
8. In connection with the personal resignation of the member
9. Systematic failure of a member to fulfill his duties, including absence without good reason at plenary sessions of the mäslihat session or meetings of the mäslihat bodies to which he was elected, more than three times in a row;
- The decision on the early termination of the powers of a deputy is made at a session of the mäslihat by a majority of votes from the total number of present deputies upon the presentation of the relevant territorial election commission.
- Members of mäslihats who carry out their activities on a permanent or vacant basis, paid from the state budget, are not entitled to carry out entrepreneurial activities, independently participate in the management of an economic entity, engage in other paid activities, except for pedagogical, scientific or other creative.

== Legislative session ==
The meetings of the Mäslihat members, if at least 2/3's of the total number of representatives are present, is considered eligible and is held in the form of a plenary session. In the work of the session, a break may be made for a period established by the Mäslihat, but not exceeding fifteen calendar days.

The time table of a consultation is fashioned with the aid of the chairman of the session on the idea of an extended-term plan of labor of the Mäslihat. Proposals for the time table of the classes can be provided to the chairman by way of conferences of the area people, public institutions. The Mäslihat makes a decision on the approval of the time table. In case of disagreement at the agenda, balloting is executed one by one for every difficulty. The problem is taken into consideration protected inside the time table if most of Mäslihat members vote for it.

Durations of the Mäslihat are held at a time unique with the aid of way of the legislature. Time is allotted for presenters and co-presenters to reply questions. Deputy inquiries, speeches for giving motives and answers to questions are not taken into consideration as speeches in the debate. The debate is closed by way of an open vote via a majority of the members present at the consultation. The ground getting ready to order of the meeting is given to the deputy out of turn after the give up of the preceding speech.

== Commissions ==
The Mäslihat forms standing commissions from among the deputies for preliminary consideration and preparation of issues. The chairmen and members of the standing committees are elected by the Mäslihat lawmakers by open vote. Public hearings are held to discuss the most critical and socially big problems attributed to the jurisdiction of those commissions. The meetings of the commissions are, in general, open, besides for instances while the issues below consideration in accordance with the law of the Republic of Kazakhstan "On state secrets" are categorized as nation or reputable secrets. The standing commission invitations representatives of fascinated state bodies, the public, and the media to public hearings.

There are currently four commissions in the Regional Mäslihat of which are:

- Standing Commission on Economics and Budget
- Standing Commission on Social Affairs
- Standing Commission of the Regional Mäslihat on Issues, Deputy Ethics, Legality, Ecology and Nature Management
- Standing Commission on Agrarian Issues and Industrial – Innovative Development

== Current composition ==
The results of the last Akmola Regional Mäslihat elections were officially published on 24 March 2023. The number of members by party are shown in the table below. The other 16 members were elected through single-member district voting.

Members elected through party-list voting
Party	Seats won
Amanat	13
Auyl People's Democratic Patriotic Party	2
Aq Jol Democratic Party	1
Single-member district	16
All Members	32

On the 30th of March, the official website of the Mäslihat has published that as its new composition began the already-formed Amanat-led parliamentary group consisted of 26 members (out of 32). The political affiliations of the Amanat group's members, neither their names, were not stated.

== See also ==
- Mäslihat
- 2023 Akmola regional election
