= Karaganda Regional Mäslihat =

Unicameral local legislature of Kazakhstan

Karaganda Regional Mäslihat Қарағанды облыстық мәслихаты

Type
- Type: Unicameral

History
- Founded: 10 December 1993

Leadership
- Secretary: Serık Öteşov, Nur Otan since 15 January 2021

Structure
- Seats: 38
- Political groups: Majority (29); Nur Otan (29); Opposition (9); Ak Zhol (3); Auyl (3); People's Party (3)
- Length of term: 5 years

Elections
- Voting system: Party-list proportional representation Largest remainder method
- Last election: 10 January 2021
- Next election: 2026

Website
- karoblmaslihat.gov.kz

The Karaganda Regional Mäslihat (Kazakh: Қарағанды облыстық мәслихаты, romanized: Qarağandy oblystyq mäslihaty) is a unicameral legislative branch of the Karaganda Region formed in 1993 where it convenes in Karaganda. As a decision-making body, the Mäslihat adopts resolutions and measures for the region and elects its own Secretary of which is Serık Öteşov (Nur Otan). The Mäslihat has 38 members, who since 2021 have been elected through party-list proportional representation. Currently, the legislature is allocated among four parties with the Nur Otan (NO) controlling the majority of 29 seats followed by Ak Zhol Democratic Party (AJ), Auyl People's Democratic Patriotic Party (AUYL), and People's Party of Kazakhstan (QHP) with each having three mandates to be parliamentary opposition to NO's majority.

== History ==
On 10 December 1993, the Law "On local representative and executive bodies of the Republic of Kazakhstan" was adopted by the Supreme Council, which made significant changes to the name and structure of local government bodies. The representative bodies began to be called mäslihats (local assemblies). Unlike the local councils whom existed prior and were formed at all levels of territorial administration, the members of the mäslihats were elected only in regions, districts and cities of regional and republican significance and the capital.

On 7 March 1994, elections to local representative bodies were held in Kazakhstan, which included the Karaganda Region where 45 constituencies were formed, and the corresponding number of members were elected. The 1st Session of the Regional Mäslihat of the 1st convocation took place on 30 March 1994. Serık Ağibaev was unanimously elected as the Mäslihat's Secretary. The members of the new representative body consisted of active supporters of the President Nursultan Nazarbayev over his course towards reforms and transformations. In May 1997, the Decree of the President of the Republic of Kazakhstan "On further measures to improve the administrative-territorial structure of the Republic of Kazakhstan" was issued, in accordance with which the borders of the Karaganda Region were changed which included the Zhezkazgan Region. According to the Law of the Republic of Kazakhstan dated 19 June 1997 "On the system of local representative bodies in the context of changes in the administrative-territorial structure of the Republic of Kazakhstan", the members of the Regional Mäslihat of the former Zhezkazgan Region retained their powers and became members of the Karaganda Regional Mäslihat instead.

Following the changes to the law in 2018, the elections for the Mäslihat were held on 10 January 2021 where members for the first time were elected through party-list proportional representation. From there, the Nur Otan (NO) took 29 seats followed by three parties: Ak Zhol Democratic Party (AJ), Auyl People's Democratic Patriotic Party (AUYL), and People's Party of Kazakhstan (QHP) whom earned three seats each. At the opening session of the 7th convocation, Serık Öteşov (NO) was re-elected as the Secretary of the Mäslihat on 15 January.

== Elections ==
Mäslihat members are generally up for re-election every 5 years and are elected on the basis of party-list proportional representation with a required 7% electoral threshold to win any seats in the legislature. If only one parties manages to bypass the electoral threshold, then the party win the second highest number of votes is granted enough seats for representation in the mäslihat regardless whether it had passed the threshold or not. A member of the mäslihat may be a citizen of Kazakhstan who has reached 20 years of age and can be a member of only one mäslihat.

== Powers and functions ==
In accordance with the Article 20 of the Constitution of Kazakhstan "On local government and self-government in the Republic of Kazakhstan"

- A member of a mäslihat expresses the will of the population of the corresponding administrative-territorial units, taking into account national interests.
- The powers of a member of a mäslihat begin from the moment of his registration as a deputy of a mäslihat by the relevant territorial election commission and terminate from the moment of termination of the powers of a mäslihat.
- The powers of a member of a mäslihat shall be terminated ahead of schedule in the following cases:
1. Election or appointment of a deputy to a position, the occupation of which, in accordance with the legislation of the Republic of Kazakhstan, is incompatible with the performance of deputy duties;
2. entry into legal force of a court decision on the recognition of a member incapacitated or partially incapacitated;
3. Termination of powers of mäslihat;
4. Death of a member by entry into force of a court declaration;
5. Termination of his citizenship of the Republic of Kazakhstan;
6. Entry into legal force of the court's conviction against the member;
7. Leaving for permanent residence outside the relevant administrative-territorial unit;
8. In connection with the personal resignation of the member;
9. Systematic failure of a member to fulfill his duties, including absence without good reason at plenary sessions of the mäslihat session or meetings of the mäslihat bodies to which he was elected, more than three times in a row;
- The decision on the early termination of the powers of a deputy is made at a session of the mäslihat by a majority of votes from the total number of present deputies upon the presentation of the relevant territorial election commission.
- Members of mäslihats who carry out their activities on a permanent or vacant basis, paid from the state budget, are not entitled to carry out entrepreneurial activities, independently participate in the management of an economic entity, engage in other paid activities, except for pedagogical, scientific or other creative.

== Current composition ==
The last election for the Karaganda Regional Mäslihat was held on 10 January 2021.

| Party | Seats |
|---|---|
| Nur Otan (NO) | 29 / 38 |
| Ak Zhol Democratic Party (AJ) | 3 / 38 |
| Auyl People's Democratic Patriotic Party (AUYL) | 3 / 38 |
| People's Party of Kazakhstan (QHP) | 3 / 38 |

== See also ==
- Mäslihat
- 2021 Karaganda Regional Mäslihat election
