= Aktobe Regional Mäslihat =

Legislature of Aktobe Region, Kazakhstan

Aktobe Regional Mäslihat Ақтөбе облыстық мәслихаты
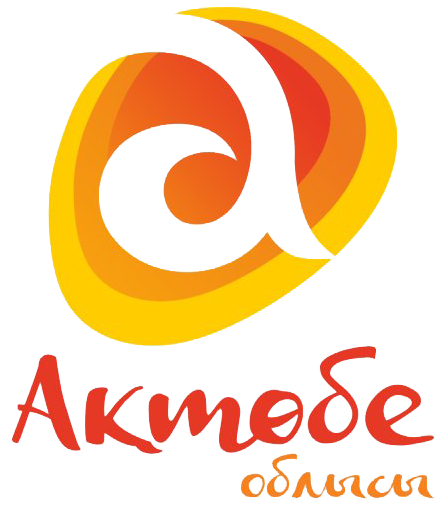

Type
- Type: Unicameral

History
- Founded: 10 December 1993

Leadership
- Secretary: Gülqasima Süintaeva, Aq Jol since 30 March 2023

Structure
- Seats: 33
- Political groups: Majority (25); Amanat (25); Opposition (8); Auyl (4); Aq Jol (4)
- Length of term: 5 years

Elections
- Last election: 19 March 2023
- Next election: 2028

Website
- aktobeoblmaslihat.kz

The Aktobe Regional Mäslihat (Kazakh: Ақтөбе облыстық мәслихаты, romanized: Aqtöbe oblystyq mäslihaty) is a local unicameral legislature of the Aktobe Region, which was formed in 1993. Since 2023, half of the members of the mäslihat have been elected through party-list proportional representation and the other are elected through single-mandate election. The Regional Mäslihat is currently chaired by Secretary Gülqasima Süintaeva (Aq Jol).

== History ==
After the adoption of the law on the early termination of the powers of local Councils of People's Deputies, the law "On local representative and executive bodies of the Republic of Kazakhstan" was adopted on 10 December 1993 No. 2578-XII, in which the representative body of the population of the region was formed into a mäslihat. Local representative bodies were chosen to be elected by the population of the corresponding administrative-territorial units for a period of 5 years in which the first ones were held on 7 March 1994 where 37 members were elected.

On 10 October 1999, only 31 members were elected to the second convocation with the term of office for 4 years.

In the 2021 Aktobe regional election, 33 members of the mäslihat were elected on the basis of proportional representation with the Nur Otan winning majority of 27 seats.

As a result of the snap 2023 Aktobe regional election, 17 members were elected through a single-mandate election and 16 were elected through party lists. The newly-elected Secretary was Gülqasima Süintaeva, of Aq Jol.

== Powers and functions ==
In accordance with the Article 20 of the Constitution of Kazakhstan "On local government and self-government in the Republic of Kazakhstan"

- A member of a mäslihat expresses the will of the population of the corresponding administrative-territorial units, taking into account national interests.
- The powers of a member of a mäslihat begin from the moment of his registration as a deputy of a mäslihat by the relevant territorial election commission and terminate from the moment of termination of the powers of a mäslihat.
- The powers of a deputy of a mäslihat shall be terminated ahead of schedule in the following cases:
1. Election or appointment of a deputy to a position, the occupation of which, in accordance with the legislation of the Republic of Kazakhstan, is incompatible with the performance of deputy duties;
2. entry into legal force of a court decision on the recognition of a member incapacitated or partially incapacitated;
3. Termination of powers of mäslihat;
4. Death of a member by entry into force of a court declaration
5. Termination of his citizenship of the Republic of Kazakhstan;
6. Entry into legal force of the court's conviction against the deputy;
7. Leaving for permanent residence outside the relevant administrative-territorial unit;
8. In connection with the personal resignation of the deputy;
9. Systematic failure of a deputy to fulfill his duties, including absence without good reason at plenary sessions of the mäslihat session or meetings of the mäslihat bodies to which he was elected, more than three times in a row.
- The decision on the early termination of the powers of a deputy is made at a session of the mäslihat by a majority of votes from the total number of present deputies upon the presentation of the relevant territorial election commission.
- Members of mäslihats who carry out their activities on a permanent or vacant basis, paid from the state budget, are not entitled to carry out entrepreneurial activities, independently participate in the management of an economic entity, engage in other paid activities, except for pedagogical, scientific or other creative.

== Legislative session ==
A session of a mäslihat is competent if it is attended by at least 2/3's of the total number of members. The session is held in the form of plenary sessions. In the work of the session, a break may be made for a period established by the mäslihat, but not exceeding fifteen calendar days. The regular session of the mäslihat is convened at least four times a year and is chaired by the chairman. An extraordinary session is convened no later than five days from the date of the decision to hold an extraordinary session.

The agenda of the session is formed on the basis of a long-term plan of work of the mäslihat. Voting on the agenda is held separately for each issue. The issue is considered included in the agenda if the majority of the mäslihat members vote for it. The presence at sessions of representatives of the media, government agencies and public associations is allowed at the invitation of the chairman of the sessions. The session is called by the President of the Parliament of the Republic of Kazakhstan.

The time limit for speeches at meetings of the mäslihat for reports, co-reports, speeches in debates and on the order of conduct of the meeting is determined by the mäslihat. Time is allocated for presenters and co-presenters to answer questions. Questions to the speakers are submitted in writing or orally. The debate is closed by an open vote by a majority of the members present at the session. The session chairman may give the floor out of turn for information, a deputy's request, an answer to a question.

== Commissions ==
The standing commissions are for preliminary consideration and preparation of issues related to the jurisdiction of the mäslihat. The chairmen and members of the standing committees are elected by the Maslikhat by open vote from among the deputies. The composition, tasks, terms of office and rights of temporary commissions are determined by the mäslihat or mäslihat secretary when they are formed. Public hearings are held to discuss the most important and socially significant issues attributed to the jurisdictions of standing commissions. Standing commissions on their own initiative can hold public hearings. The standing commission through the mass media brings to the attention of the population the topic of the upcoming public hearing.

There were five standing commissions as of 2014, of which were:

- Standing Commission on Budget, Economy, Industry and Entrepreneurship
- Standing Commission on Social and Cultural Development
- Standing Commission on Agrarian Issues, Ecology and Nature Management
- Standing Commission on Construction, Transport, Trade, Housing and Utilities and Digitalization
- Standing Commission on Parliamentary Powers and Ethics, Legality, Law Enforcement and Public Relations

== Latest election ==
The 8th convocation of the Mäslihat was elected during the 2023 Aktobe regional election. 67 candidates stood for the election. The results were:

Party	Party-list			Constituency			Total seats
Party	Votes	%	Seats	Votes	%	Seats	Total seats
Amanat			13	141,449	73.01	12	25
Auyl People's Democratic Patriotic Party			1	37,527	19.37	3	4
Aq Jol			2	14,753	7.62	2	4
Total			16	193,729	100.00	17	33
Source: aqtobegazeti.kz, gov.kz
