= 2021 Aktobe regional election =

- 10 January 2021
- All 33 seats in the Aktobe Regional Mäslihat; 17 seats needed for a majority
- Turnout: 58.78%
| Party | Leader | Vote % | Seats | +/– |
|---|---|---|---|---|
| Nur Otan | Ondasyn Orazalin | 80.72% | 27 | New |
| Ak Zhol | Asqar Sadyqov | 8.64% | 3 | New |
| Auyl | Orazbek Dalmağambetov | 8.14% | 3 | New |
This lists parties that won seats. See the complete results below.
| Secretary before | Secretary after |
|---|---|
| Sänia Qaldygulova; Nonpartisan | Sänia Qaldygulova; Nur Otan |

Elections to the Aktobe Regional Mäslihat were held on 10 January 2021 to elect the members of the 7th Aktobe Regional Mäslihat. For the first time, proportional representation system was used to allocate the seats. The election coincided with the 2021 Kazakh local elections.

The Nur Otan won a majority of 27 seats followed by the Ak Zhol Democratic Party (AJ) and Auyl People's Democratic Patriotic Party (AUYL) in which both parties earned 3 seats.

== Background ==
On 21 October 2020, election date was scheduled for the Aktobe Regional Mäslihat along with other local races. This came following the implementation of the law in 2018 which allowed for the local mäslihat seats to be elected through party-list proportional representation.

At the Nur Otan's party conference held on 17 November 2020, a party-list consisting of 50 candidates to the mäslihat were approved. On 8 December 2020, Arkadiy Ni, the Regional Mäslihat councillor and candidate for the Nur Otan party was arrested on the suspicion of committing a criminal offense against a person. As a result, he was expelled from the party.

== Parties ==
List of parties which submitted their lists to the Aktobe Regional Electoral Commission:

| Name | | Ideology | No. 1 in party-list | No. of candidates | Registration date |
|---|---|---|---|---|---|
| NO | Nur Otan | Big tent | Azamat Adaev | 50 | 27 November 2020 |
| ADAL | Adal | Eco-socialism | Nurbek Qauqaqov | 4 | 1 December 2020 |
| AJ | Ak Zhol Democratic Party | Liberalism | Äsia Quldybaeva | 5 | 3 December 2020 |
| AUYL | Auyl People's Democratic Patriotic Party | Agrarianism | Jomart Baimuhan | 5 | 4 December 2020 |

== Results ==
| Party | Votes | % | Seats | +/– |
|---|---|---|---|---|
| Nur Otan | 256,655 | 80.72 | 27 | +27 |
| Ak Zhol Democratic Party | 27,460 | 8.64 | 3 | +3 |
| Auyl People's Democratic Patriotic Party | 25,893 | 8.14 | 3 | +3 |
| Adal | 7,962 | 2.50 | 0 | 0 |
| Total | 317,970 | 100.00 | 33 | 0 |
| Valid votes | 317,970 | 96.24 | | |
| Invalid/blank votes | 12,433 | 3.76 | | |
| Total votes | 330,403 | 100.00 | | |
| Registered voters/turnout | 562,351 | 58.75 | | |
Source: Aktobe Regional Election Commission

Popular vote
| Nur Otan | 80.72% |
| Ak Zhol | 8.64% |
| Auyl | 8.14% |
| Adal | 2.50% |

Mäslihat seats
| Nur Otan | 81.82% |
| Ak Zhol | 9.09% |
| Auyl | 9.09% |
