= 2023 Aktobe regional election =

- 19 March 2023
- All 33 seats in the Aktobe Regional Mäslihat; 17 seats needed for a majority
- Turnout: 57.22%
Party	Leader	Vote %	Seats	+/–
Amanat	Ondasyn Orazalin		25	−2
Aq Jol	Asqar Sadyqov		4	+1
Auyl	Älibek Bazarğaliev		4	+1
This lists parties that won seats. See the complete results below.
Secretary before	Secretary after
Sänia Qaldygulova; Amanat	Gülqasima Süintaeva; Amanat

Elections were held on 19 March 2023 to elect the members of the 8th Aktobe Regional Mäslihat. This election, 17 members were elected through a single-mandate election and 16 were elected through party lists. The election coincided with the 2023 Kazakh local elections.

The Amanat won a supermajority of 25 seats followed by the Aq Jol Democratic Party (AJ) and Auyl People's Democratic Patriotic Party (AUYL) in which both parties earned 4 seats.

== Background ==
In the aftermath of the 2022 Kazakh unrest, President Kassym-Jomart Tokayev in his March 2022 State of the Nation Address unveiled a series of reforms, including the changing of the electoral system of all mäslihats into a mixed one, as opposed to the previous one, which used to elect all its members through proportional representation.

== Campaign ==
67 candidates ran for Mäslihat seats.

== Results ==
There were 562,698 registered voters in the region. 321,961 participated in the election.

After its election, the 8th convocation of the Mäslihat was:

Party	Party-list			Constituency			Total seats
Party	Votes	%	Seats	Votes	%	Seats	Total seats
Amanat			13	141,449	73.01	12	25
Auyl People's Democratic Patriotic Party			1	37,527	19.37	3	4
Aq Jol			2	14,753	7.62	2	4
Total			16	193,729	100.00	17	33
Source: aqtobegazeti.kz, gov.kz
