= Äli Bektaev =

Kazakh politician

- Әли Бектаев
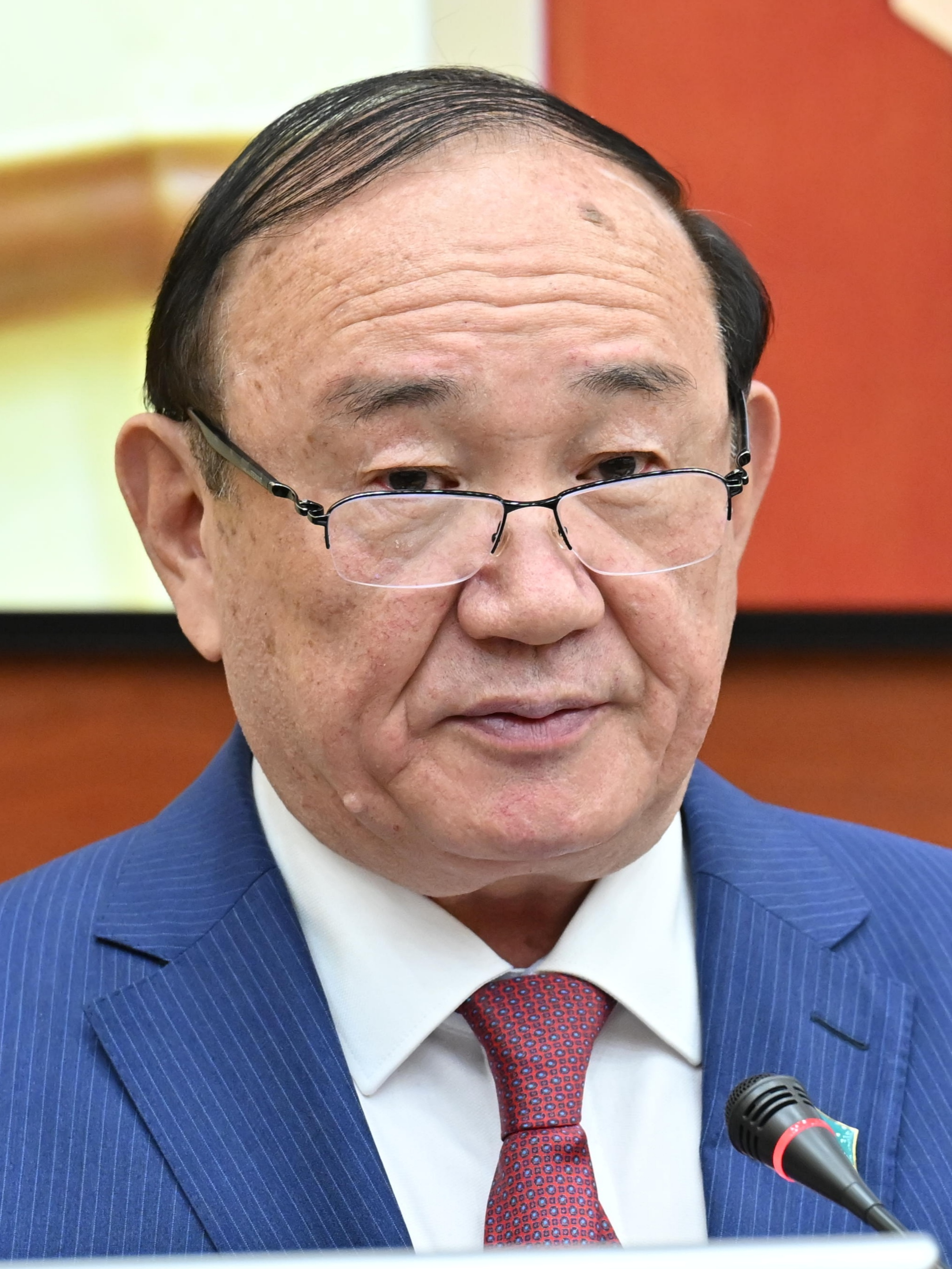
- Bektaev in 2023

Senator for Turkistan Region
- Incumbent
- Assumed office 1 October 2014 Serving with Quanysh Aitahanov, Alimjan Qurtaev
- Preceded by: Orynbai Rahmanberdiev

Äkim of Turkistan
- In office 20 February 2006 – 28 May 2008
- Preceded by: Muhit Äliev
- Succeeded by: Beibit Syzdyqov

Chairman of Auyl
- In office 26 August 2015 – 18 October 2023
- Preceded by: Gani Qaliev
- Succeeded by: Serik Egizbaev

Personal details
- Born: 20 April 1962 (age 64) Yangi-Bazar, Kazakh SSR, Soviet Union
- Party: Auyl
- Other political affiliations: QKP (until 1991)
- Spouse: Irina Bektaeva
- Children: 4
- Education: Kazakh National Agrarian University; KIMEP University

Äli Äbdıkärımūly Bektaev (Kazakh: Әли Әбдікәрімұлы Бектаев; born 20 April 1962) is a Kazakh politician who has served as a Senator for Turkistan Region since 1 October 2014. From February 2006 to May 2008, he was the Äkim of Turkistan and continued serving as deputy until 2014. A member of the Auyl People's Democratic Patriotic Party, he served as its chairman from 2015 to 2023.

== Biography ==
=== Early life and education ===
Bektaev was born to a Muslim Kazakh family in the village of Yangi-Bazar in Turkistan Region. He is the son of Abdulkarim (Äbdikärim) Bektaev. In 1984, he graduated from the Faculty of Agricultural Mechanization in the Kazakh National Agrarian University as a mechanical engineer. In 1992, he earned his degree from the Faculty of Political Science in the KIMEP University with a degree in Theory of Social and Political Relations.

In 2000, he received the academic title of candidate of economic sciences, defended his dissertation on the topic "Formation and functioning of segments of the food market in the regions (on the example of the South Kazakhstan region)".

=== Career ===
From 1984, Bektaev worked as a chief engineer of the State Farm. In 1987, he became the deputy head and instructor of the Sairam District Party Committee. In 1989, Bektaev was appointed as Secretary of the Party Committee of the State Farm where he worked until 1990. In 1991, he was a consultant of the Chimkent Regional Party Committee. That same year, he became the Deputy General Director of the PKF Kazygurt Ltd until he was appointed as Deputy Head of the Kazygurt District Administration in 1992. From 1994 to 1999, Bektaev served as the head of the Department for Youth, Tourism and Sports, Department for Tourism and Sports, Department of Sports and Physical Education of the South Kazakhstan Region until he was appointed as the Head of the Department of Civil Service of the South Kazakhstan Region. That same year, he became the head of the Wind Power Plant and Investments Department of the South Kazakhstan Region.

From July 2000, Bektaev was the äkim of Kazygurt District and from September 2002, he served as deputy äkim of the South Kazakhstan Region. On 20 February 2006, he was appointed the äkim of Turkistan. From 29 May 2008, Bektaev was the deputy äkim of South Kazakhstan Region until he was elected as Senator on 1 October 2014. From there, he served as member of the Committee for Social and Cultural Development and Science.

On 26 August 2015, at the 10th Extraordinary Congress of the Kazakhstani Social Democratic Party Auyl which was held in Astana, Senator Bektaev was elected as the party chairman by its delegates. During the 2019 Kazakh presidential election, he represented Auyl nominee Toleutai Raqymbekov at a televised debate between the candidates where he said "agriculture is the commodity security of our country. Only a country that fully provides its people with the necessary goods can consider itself independent."

In 2017, Bektaev became a member of the Senate Committee for Finance and Budget and since 2 September 2019, he's been serving as chairman of the Committee for Agrarian Issues, Environmental Management and Rural Development. Bektaev was reelected again in 2020 as Senator.
