= 2021 Akmola regional election =

← 2018	10 January 2021	2026 →
- All 32 seats in the Akmola Regional Mäslihat; 17 seats needed for a majority
- Turnout: 71.45%
Party	Leader	Vote %	Seats	+/–
Nur Otan	Ruslan Abilov	75.72%	26	New
Ak Zhol	Ainagul Adrahmanova	8.91%	3	New
Auyl	Edil Aishuq	8.90%	3	New
This lists parties that won seats. See the complete results below.
Secretary before	Secretary after
Alibek Baimagambetov; Nonpartisan	Murat Balpan; Nur Otan

Elections to the Akmola Regional Mäslihat were held on 10 January 2021 to elect the 32 members of the 7th Akmola Regional Mäslihat to coincide with the 2021 Kazakh local elections. It was the first election to be held under newly implemented proportional representation.

Nur Otan (NO) won a majority of 26 seats, followed by Ak Zhol and Auyl People's Democratic Patriotic Party with both winning 3 seats. The first session of the newly elected 7th Regional Mäslihat convened on 15 January 2021. From there, Murat Balpan (NO) was elected as the new Mäslihat Secretary.

== Background ==
Following the constitutional amendments in 2018, all local elections were made to be elected through party-list proportional representation.

On 22 October 2020, elections to the Akmola Regional Mäslihat were scheduled to be held on 10 January 2021, the same date as the local and Mazhilis elections. The Nur Otan party held a conference on 17 November 2020 where the delegates approved party-list of 58 candidates as well as the election program in improving lives of the Akmola citizens. By 11 December 2020, the Akmola Election Commission registered in total of 72 candidates from 4 parties except for People's Party of Kazakhstan (QHP) which refused to contest seats in the regional mäslihat.

== Parties ==
Name		Ideology	No. 1 in party-list	No. of candidates	Registration date
NO	Nur Otan	Big tent	Ruslan Abilov	58	25 November 2020
AUYL	Auyl People's Democratic Patriotic Party	Agrarianism	Edil Aishuq	6	30 November 2020
AJ	Ak Zhol Democratic Party	Liberalism	Ainagul Adrahmanova	4	7 December 2020
ADAL	Adal	Eco-socialism	Olga Adrahmanova	4	2 December 2020

== Results ==
Party	Votes	%	Seats	+/–
Nur Otan	275,414	75.72	26	+26
Ak Zhol Democratic Party	32,398	8.91	3	+3
Auyl People's Democratic Patriotic Party	32,365	8.90	3	+3
Adal	23,544	6.47	0	0
Total	363,721	100.00	32	0
Valid votes	363,721	97.96		
Invalid/blank votes	7,560	2.04		
Total votes	371,281	100.00		
Registered voters/turnout	519,633	71.45		
Source: Akmola Territorial Election Commission

Popular vote
Nur Otan	75.72%
Ak Zhol	8.91%
Auyl	8.90%
Adal	6.47%

Mäslihat seats
Nur Otan	81.25%
Ak Zhol	9.38%
Auyl	9.38%
Adal	0%
