= People's Coalition =

People's Coalition may refer to:

- People's Coalition (Croatia), a coalition in Croatia dominated by the Social Democratic Party of Croatia
- People's Coalition (Fiji), a coalition in Fiji, dominated by the Fiji Labour Party, which contested (and won) the 1999 elections
- People's Coalition (Indonesia), a coalition of political parties
- People's Coalition (Kazakhstan), a political alliance in Kazakhstan, which was formed in support of President Kassym-Jomart Tokayev during the 2022 elections
- People's Coalition (Spain), a coalition in Spain that operated in the 1980s, dominated by the People's Party
- People's Coalition 5 Plus (Narodnaja Kaalicyja Piaciorka Plus), a political alliance in Belarus, formed to oppose President Alexander Lukashenko in the 2004 elections

== See also ==
- Coalition
