= Qairat Aituğanov =

Kazakh politician

- Қайрат Айтуғанов
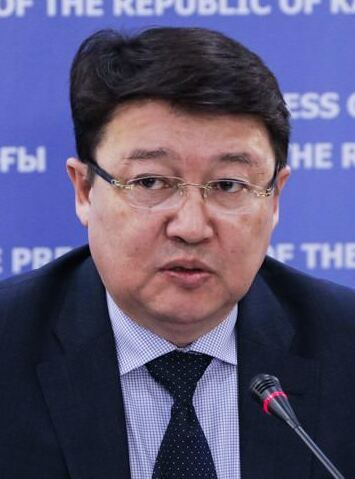
- Aituğanov in 2017

Chairman of Auyl
- Incumbent
- Assumed office 23 June 2026
- Preceded by: Serik Egizbaev

First Deputy Minister of Agriculture
- In office 22 July 2016 – 19 January 2018
- President: Nursultan Nazarbayev
- Prime Minister: Karim Massimov; Bakhytjan Sagintayev
- Minister: Askar Myrzakhmetov
- Preceded by: Evgeny Aman (Executive Secretary)
- Succeeded by: Arman Evniev

Deputy Äkim of Karaganda Region
- In office 9 July 2012 – 27 December 2013
- Äkim: Äbilgazy Qusaiynov; Bauyrjan Äbdişev
- Preceded by: Talğat Äbilda
- Succeeded by: Ğalym Äşimov

Personal details
- Born: 12 April 1962 (age 64) Leningradskoye, Kazakh SSR, Soviet Union
- Party: Auyl
- Spouse: Baqyt Bilialova
- Children: 2
- Education: Tselinograd Agricultural Institute; Almaty Institute of Energy and Communications
- Occupation: Economist; agronomist; politician

Qairat Qaparūly Aituğanov (Kazakh: Қайрат Қапарұлы Айтуғанов; born 12 April 1962) is a Kazakh economist, agronomist, and politician who has served as chairman of the Auyl party since 2026. He previously served as First Deputy Minister of Agriculture of Kazakhstan from 2016 to 2018 and held senior positions in the Ministry of Agriculture, KazAgro Holding, and regional government. He was also chairman of the board of Saken Seifullin Kazakh Agrotechnical University from 2020 to 2022.

== Biography ==
=== Early life and education ===
Aituğanov was born on 12 April 1962 in the village of Leningradskoye, North Kazakhstan Region. In 1984, he graduated from the Kokchetav branch of the Tselinograd Agricultural Institute with a degree in agronomy. He completed postgraduate studies at the All-Union Research Institute of Economics of Agriculture (VNIIESH) in 1990 and graduated from the Almaty Institute of Energy and Communications in 2000 with a degree in engineering economics.

In 2009, Aituğanov received a Doctor of Economics degree after defending a dissertation entitled Problems of Integration Development in the Agrarian Sector of Kazakhstan. He was later awarded the title of Honorary Professor of the Kazakh National Agrarian University.

=== Career ===
Aituğanov began his career in 1979 as an operator at the Kokchetav post office. Following his graduation, he worked as an assistant at the Tselinograd Agricultural Institute and later held agronomic and economic positions at the Karabulak State Farm in Kokchetav Region.

During the 1990s, he worked in regional government and economic administration, including positions in the Kokshetau Regional Äkimat, the North Kazakhstan regional administration, and the Agency for Strategic Planning and Reforms. He subsequently held senior management positions at Akmola Electric Grid Company and served as vice president of the Union of Farmers of Kazakhstan.

From 2005 onward, Aituğanov occupied a number of senior posts within the Ministry of Agriculture and state-owned agricultural enterprises. He served as project coordinator for a World Bank programme at the Ministry of Agriculture, held executive positions at the South Kazakhstan Social and Entrepreneurial Corporation (SEC Ontustik), and was deputy chairman of the management board of KazAgro Holding.

On 6 June 2011, Aituğanov was appointed deputy chairman of the management board of KazAgro, a position he held until 9 July 2012, when he was appointed deputy äkim of Karaganda Region. He served in that office until 27 December 2013. On 28 December 2013, he was appointed deputy chairman of the board of directors of KazAgroProduct, becoming chairman of the board in January 2014. After serving in that position until 23 December 2014, he was appointed deputy chairman of the Federation of Trade Unions of Kazakhstan.

On 22 July 2016, Aituğanov was appointed First Vice Minister of Agriculture of Kazakhstan. He served in the position until 16 January 2018, when he was relieved of his duties by government decree.

After leaving government service, Aituğanov joined Saken Seifullin Kazakh Agrotechnical University, serving as vice rector from 2018 to 2020 and as chairman of the university's board from 27 August 2020 to 2 November 2022.

On 23 June 2026, Aituğanov was unanimously elected chairman of the Auyl party at its 25th Extraordinary Congress.

== Awards ==
- Medal "10 years of Astana" (2008)
- Medal "20 Years of Independence of the Republic of Kazakhstan" (2012)
- Medal "20 Years of the Constitution of the Republic of Kazakhstan" (2015)
- Medal for Distinguished Labor (2016)
- Nur Otan Party Medal for Active Service (2016)
- Order of Kurmet (2023)
