= Sovkhoz =

Soviet state-owned farm

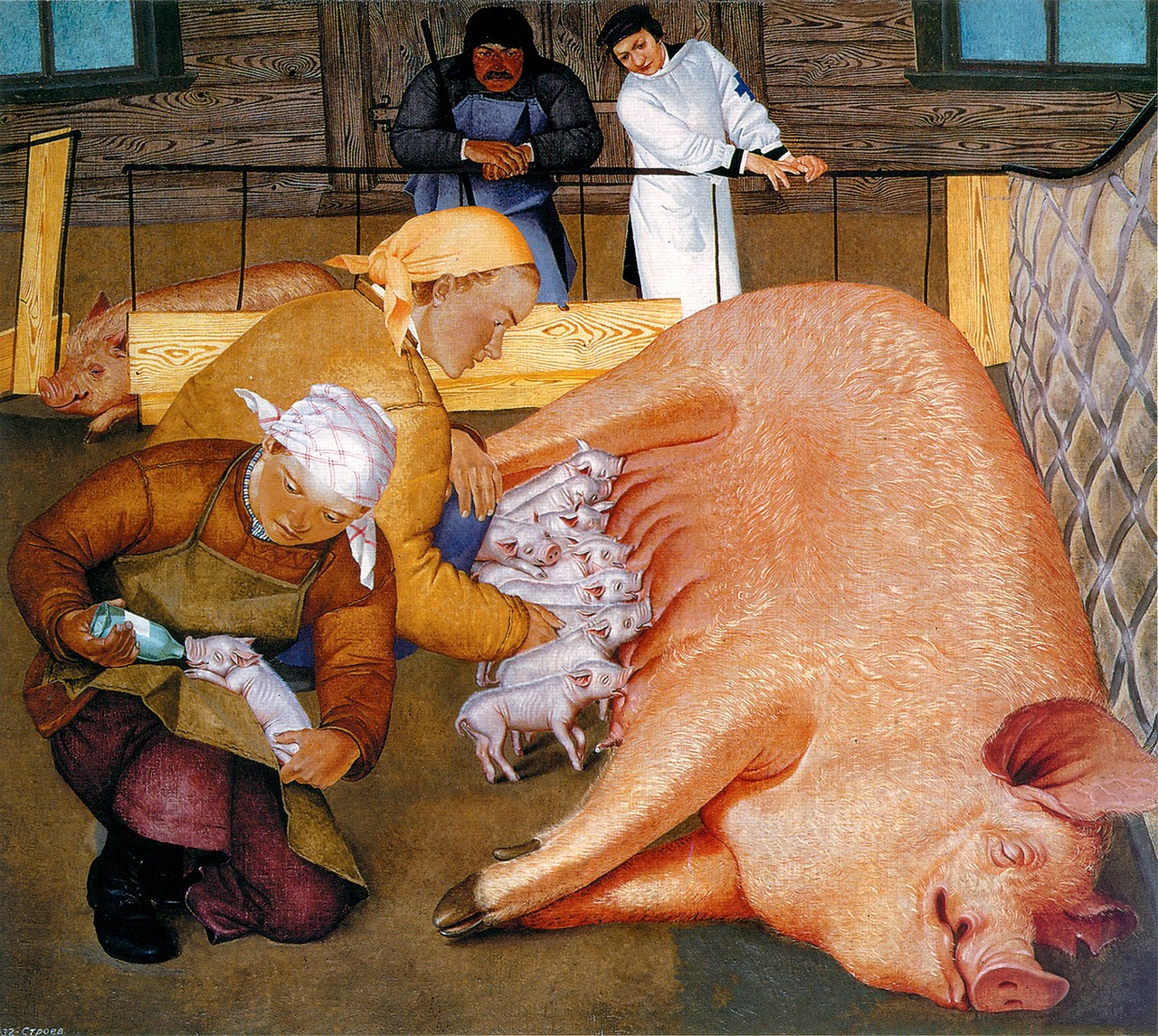
1932 Socialist Realism painting, "In a pig-breeding sovkhoz" (Petr Stroev)

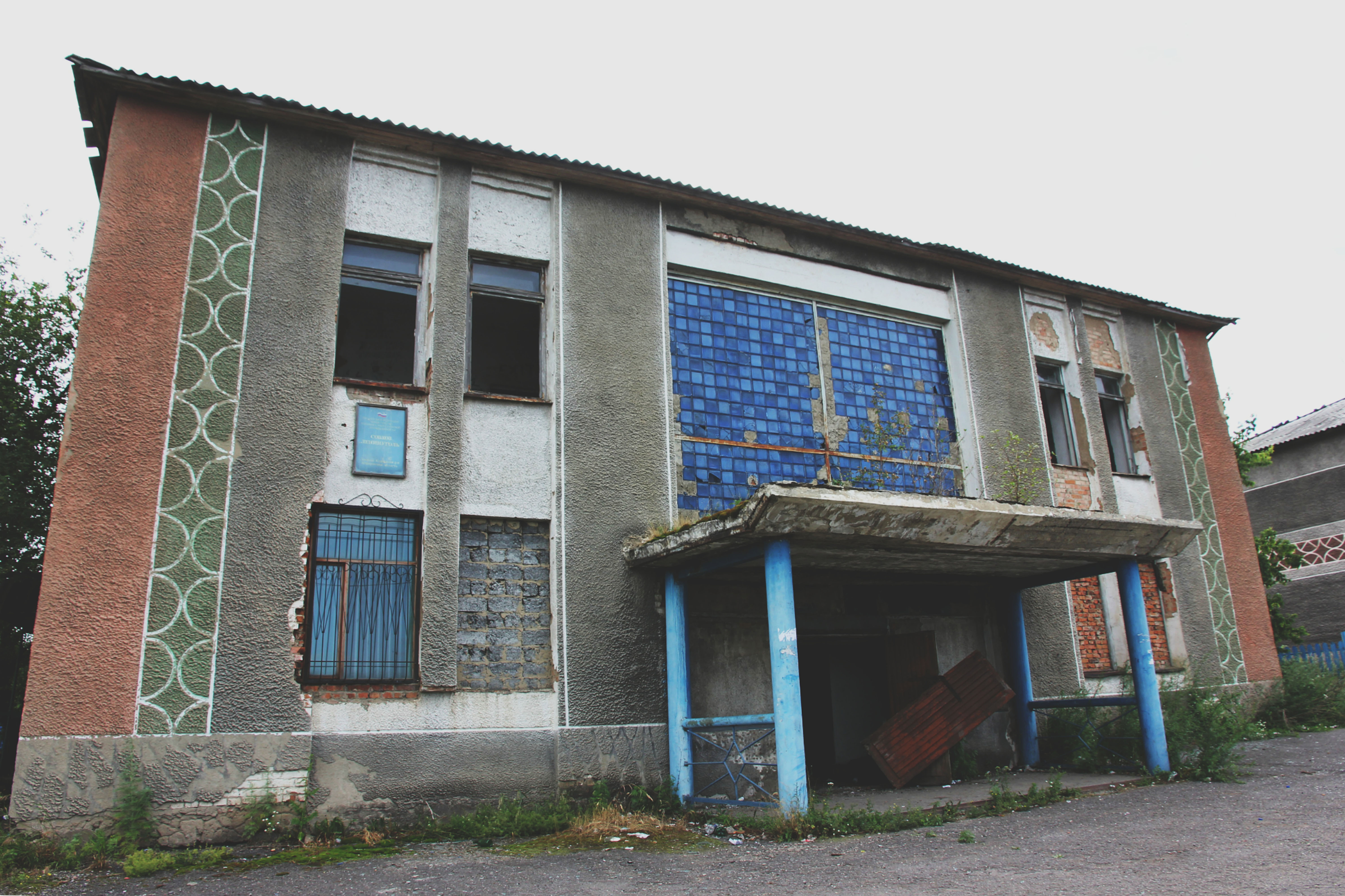
Headquarters of the "Leninugol" sovkhoz, Kemerovo Oblast.

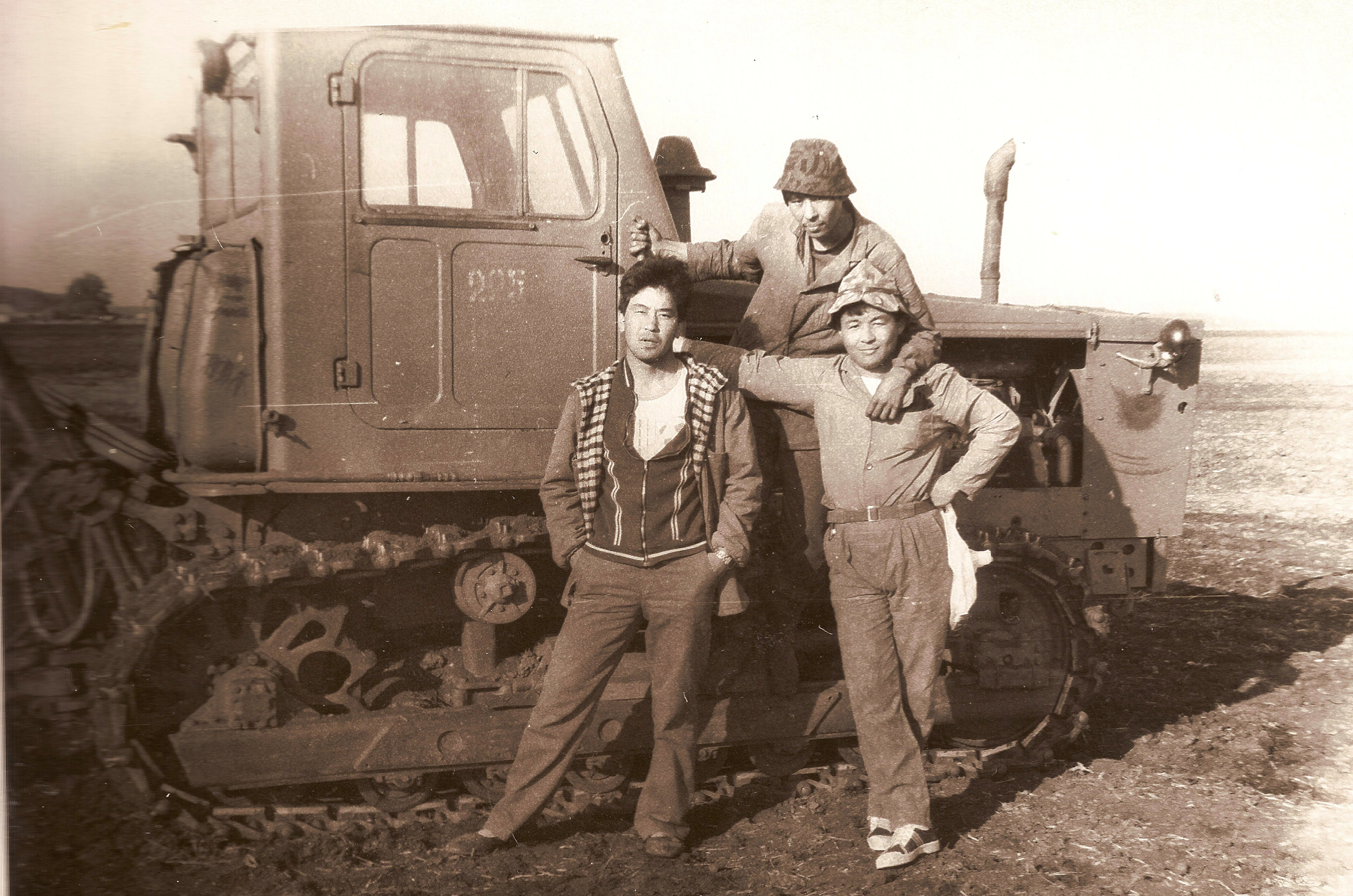
Students from the Kazakh Agricultural Institute at the Novopokrovsky sovkhoz, 1991.

A sovkhoz (Note: Russian: совхоз, IPA: [sɐfˈxos], abbreviated from советское хозяйство (sovetskoye khozyaystvo); lit. 'council farm'; plural: совхозы (sovkhozy); 'sovkhozes') was a form of state-owned farm or agricultural enterprise in the Soviet Union.

It is usually contrasted with kolkhoz, which is a collective-owned farm. Just as the members of a kolkhoz were called "kolkhozniks", (Note: Russian: колхозники (kolkhozniki)) the workers of a sovkhoz were called "sovkhozniks". (Note: Russian: совхозники (sovkhozniki))

== History ==
Soviet state farms started to be created in 1918 as an ideological example of "socialist agriculture of the highest order".

Kolkhozes, or collective farms, were regarded for a long time as an intermediate stage in the transition to the ideal of state farming. While kolkhozy were typically created by combining small individual farms together in a cooperative structure, a sovkhoz would be organized by the state on land confiscated from former large estates (so-called "state reserve land" that was left over after distribution of land to individuals) and sovkhoz workers would be recruited from among landless rural residents. The sovkhoz employees would be paid regulated wages, whereas the remuneration system in a kolkhoz relied on cooperative-style distribution of farm earnings (in cash and in kind) among the members.

In 1990, the Soviet Union had 23,500 sovkhozy, or 45% of the total number of large-scale collective and state farms. The average size of a sovkhoz was 15,300 hectares (153 km^{2}), nearly three times the average kolkhoz (5,900 hectares or 59 km^{2} in 1990). Sovkhoz farms were more dominant in the Central Asian part of the Soviet Union.

During the transition era of the 1990s, many state farms were reorganized using joint stock arrangements, although the development of land markets remained constrained by opposition to private ownership of land.

== In other countries ==
- Angola
- China
- Czechoslovakia (státní statek)
- East Germany (Volkseigenes Gut)
- Ethiopia
- Mongolia
- Mozambique
- Poland (państwowe gospodarstwo rolne, PGR)

== See also ==
- Collectivization in the Soviet Union

== Sources ==
- Smith, Whitney L.; Naylor, Rosamond L. (2014). "Land Institutions and Food Security in Sub-Saharan Africa". In Rosamond L. Naylor (ed.). The Evolving Sphere of Food Security. Oxford: Oxford University Press. pp. 202–238. ISBN 9780199354078.
