= Kassym-Jomart Tokayev 2022 presidential campaign =

Kazakh political campaign

Kassym-Jomart Tokayev for President 2022
- Campaign: 2022 Kazakh presidential election
- Candidate: Kassym-Jomart Tokayev; President of Kazakhstan (2019–present); Chair of the Senate of Kazakhstan (2013–2019, 2007–2011); State Secretary of Kazakhstan (2002–2007); Prime Minister of Kazakhstan (1999–2002)
- Affiliation: People's Coalition
- Status: Announced; 1 September 2022; Official nominee 6 October 2022; Won election TBD
- Key people: Erlan Qoşanov (chief of staff)
- Slogan(s): Әділетті Қазақстан үшін ("For a Just Kazakhstan"); Қуатты Қазақстан үшін ("For a Strong Kazakhstan"); Отанымыз – бір, Мемлекетіміз – бір, Халқымыз – бір! ("We have one country, one state, one people!")

Website
- toqaev2022.kz

Incumbent president of Kazakhstan Kassym-Jomart Tokayev originally announced his candidacy during the State of the Nation Address on 1 September 2022. From there, he also proposed a constitutional change regarding the presidential term office to be extended for a nonrenewable seven-year term. Tokayev was nominated for presidency by the People's Coalition on 6 October 2022, which consisted of several major pro-government political parties and public associations in support. He was officially registered as a candidate on 12 October by the Central Election Commission after garnering a total of 399,809 signatures.

== Background ==
President Kassym-Jomart Tokayev became president following the 2019 election, where he secured his first five-year term of office upon the vote. Had Tokayev chose to run once his term expired the in originally scheduled 2024 presidential election, he would have been eligible by law to seek re-election and possibly continue hold office until 2029.

=== Announcement ===
At the annual State of the Nation Address held on 1 September 2022, Tokayev announced the 2022 presidential election to take place in autumn. From there, Tokayev voiced his interest to run for reelection and proposed a constitutional amendment in changing the president's term of office to a once seven-year term that was planned to be enacted after the elections were initially held, which would have shorten his second term in office to 2027. However, the Parliament of Kazakhstan after public controversy regarding fears of extending presidential time in office, implemented the changes to the law prior before the vote, thus granting the opportunity for Tokayev to serve seven years as president upon being reelected. Tokayev then signed the ratified constitutional amendments into law. After setting the date for the 2022 election by a presidential decree, Tokayev reiterated his commitment to run again and hinted that his election manifesto would outline "new initiatives aimed at achieving socio-economic progress".

=== Nomination ===
Amidst receiving presidential nominations by a number of public associations and political parties, Tokayev expressed his desire to be nominated from "a broad coalition of socio-political forces". This led to the formation of the People's Coalition which included the pro-government parties of Amanat, Aq Jol Democratic Party, and People's Party of Kazakhstan and various public associations supporting Tokayev. The People's Coalition held its first forum on 6 October 2022 that was attended by 2,000 representatives of political parties and more than 30 republican associations. At the event, Tokayev's candidacy was endorsed by the coalition, where Tokayev gave speech in the seven principles in "governing the nation" that included: independence; foundation of the country; interests of the state; spiritual harmony; law and order; creativity; friendship, kindness and compassion.

=== Registration ===
On 7 October 2022, Tokayev submitted his documents to the Central Election Commission (CEC) that included nominations from the republican public associations. The CEC in the following day of 8 October ruled that Tokayev met necessary compliances and due to his incumbency, was exempted from undergoing the Kazakh state language exam process. On 12 October 2022, Tokayev was officially registered by the CEC as candidate after submitting a total of 399,809 signatures in support.

Älnur Iliaşev, a civil activist and lawyer, appealed to the Supreme Court of Kazakhstan and demanded the CEC to reject Tokayev's candidacy, in which he argued that Tokayev's decree in appointing snap elections violated the principles of voting rights and that the CEC deprived citizens' voting rights to what Iliaşev described the actions as being "illegal and unconstitutional". Nevertheless, the Supreme Court following a hearing case ruled against Iliaşev's plea on 17 October 2022.

== Campaign ==
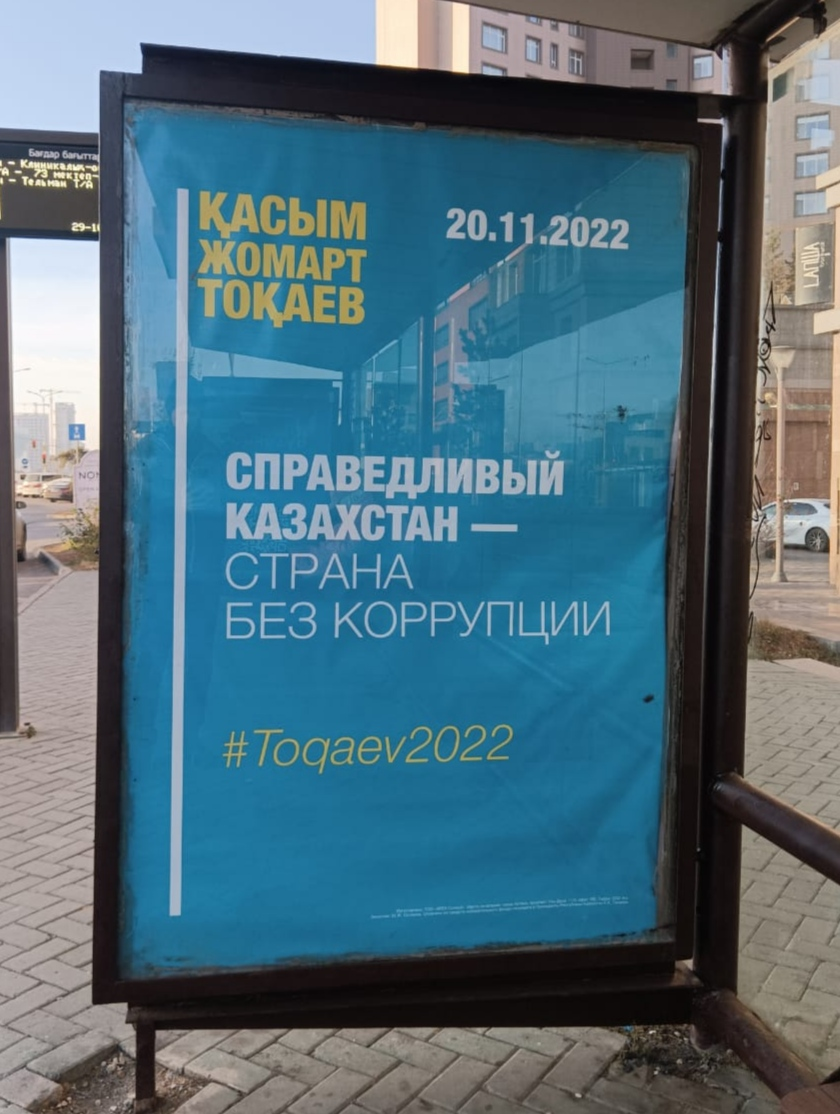
Election campaign advertising Tokayev in Russian at a bus stop in Astana, 31 October 2022

Tokayev's campaign was formally launched with the opening of his republican headquarters on 21 October 2022 across Kazakhstan, which began distributing printed leaflets, publication of information materials in the media and social networks. The following day on 22 October, a first meeting of the headquarters was held where chief of staff Erlan Qoşanov outlined the main task in explaining election programme of Tokayev to every electorate and detailed a plan in visiting a total of 207 settlements and hold "hundreds of campaign events".

Tokayev's election visits were accompanied by members of his election headquarters beginning on 27 October, where they visited the Abai Region and met with the elders and representatives of creative intelligentsia who were presented with Tokayev's election platform including its particular attention to the development of culture, support of the state language, restoration of historical and cultural monuments, along with proposed measures that would allow for development of villages. Tokayev's representatives then met with young students from the Alikhan Bokeikhan University where the canvassers noted that activities related to youth in the election program of Tokayev would be carried out regularly. The visit to Abai Region that same day concluded in a meeting with "Semei Cement" JSC labour collective.

On 28 October, representatives of Tokayev visited Ulytau Region. From there, the team held a meeting with region's residents in the Jezkazgan City House of Friendship and Culture of Peoples from where campaign headquarters' chief of staff Qoşanov described the Ulytau Region as "a sacred place that symbolises the unity of the nation". The representatives then attended several production enterprises such as the "ULYTAU NAN" LLP bakery and "Kazakhmys Smelting" LLP where they explained workers Tokayev's election initiatives in developing business, strengthening trade unions along with protection of labour rights, as well as modernisation of manufacturing processes.

By 29 October, Tokayev's election headquarters reported that it had received a total of 3,460 submitted proposals from voters ranging the topics in a following breakdown:

- Social security – 598 (21.2%)
- Housing and Communal Services – 492 (17.4%),
- Land relations – 358 (12.7%)
- Education – 210 (7.4%)

On 31 October, Tokayev's campaign staff visited Karaganda. There, they met with regional entrepreneurs where the development of the national economy and the stimulation of private business was discussed, with Qoşanov announcing that more than 5,000 campaign events were held. Toktar Aubakirov, a member of election headquarters, embarked the amount of campaign events as being "small", still addressed the need in adding the campaign supporting contribution "to change and renew Kazakhstan" and for everyone supporting Tokayev to "vote as one" on election day. That same day, the representatives paid a visit to Karagandy State University in meeting with students regarding Tokayev's policies on youth and education and later the "Kazakhstanskaya" mine where the campaigners outlined main priorities in supporting labour and improvements towards workers' safety. Qoşanov also met with a local 99 year old Great Patriotic War veteran, Erjan Bürkitov.

On 2 November, Tokayev's representatives paid visit to Almaty Region. In the regional village of Otegen Batyr, Aq Jol chairman Azat Peruashev held a meeting the staff of the children's clinical hospital, where main goals of the development of the national health care system specified in the election program of Tokayev were discussed. Then, the representatives visited the regional capital of Qonayev in meeting of the House of Culture attended by 200 people, which the topics in the development of regions and the renewal of rural infrastructure were mainly discussed. The representatives also talked with the mothers of many children regarding Tokayev's initiatives in supporting younger generation and providing social security for low-income families.

=== Structure ===
The republican headquarters of Tokayev's campaign had 226 offices with 7,000 workers and consisted of 474 staff members, public figures, representatives of all organiszations, scientific and expert communities, young people, famous athletes, lawmakers, as well as three parliamentary parties and 22 public associations.

== Program ==
In a visit to his campaign headquarters on 26 October 2022, Tokayev presented his election programme titled "Just Kazakhstan: for all of us and for each of us. Now and always" (Kazakh: Әділетті Қазақстан: бәріміз және әрқайсымыз үшін. Қазір және әрдайым). With the launch of his official campaign website on 28 October, a full text of Tokayev's programme was published from there to which the proposed change aimed at "fundamental changes" within the economy, social sphere, and regional policies with the reforms ensuring an "effective response to the aspirations of the people" as well as "resilience to the extreme pressure of external challenges" consisting of three principles:

=== Fair state ===
Political modernisation

- Systematise the implementation of political reforms aimed at forming an effective model of the state;
- Strengthen the work of newly created state bodies such as the Constitutional Court, Commissioner for Human Rights, and the Commissioner for Children's Rights to ensure protection of citizens' rights and freedoms;
- Ensuring fair composition of the Parliament and mäslihats (local assemblies) under the new electoral system of mixed-member majoritarian representation;
- Creating favorable conditions for political pluralism
- Strengthening the role of the National Kurultai and public councils for civil society development;

Efficiency of state apparatus

- Increase the quality of the public service system;
- Continuing the work of Presidential Youth Personnel Reserve to increase youth participation in civil service;
- Digital infrastructure for remote interaction from the state to citizens and businesses;
- Expanding the "People's Participation Budget" project to cities of regional significance and villages;

Objective and independent of justice system

- Ensuring equal status of all court judges;
- Abandonment of repressive methods by strengthening the protection of rights to citizens in criminal prosecution;
- Implementing an intelligence system to establish uniformity justice administration;
- Reforming the appeals system;
- Expanding the case categories considered by a jury;
- Allowing juries to assess cancelled judicial acts;
- Expanding alternative types of punishment to imprisonment;
- Establish effective civil proceedings with the use of modern technologies and mediation;
- Strengthening the conduct of pre-trial proceedings and ensuring separation between the parties of the prosecution and the defence.

Protection of citizens' rights

- Continued fight against corruption;
- Creation of a professional, service-oriented Kazakh law enforcement;
- Prevention of prison torture and illegal investigation that causes degradation and health problems of citizens;
- Increasing measures in the fight against illegal drugs;
- Strengthening the prosecutor's supervision on constitutional rights observance;
- Expanding civic participation in the development of solutions towards offense preventions and law enforcement;
- Effective measures in combating domestic violence.

=== Fair economy ===
Economic policies

- Increase the assets of the Samruk-Kazyna national wealth fund to $100 billion;
- Decreasing the influence of black market within the level of OECD countries (15% of GDP);
- Reducing the state's share in the economy to 14% by 2025;
- Attracting foreign investment to no less than 150 billion dollars;
- Strengthened control over monopoly to ensure economic competition;
- New Tax Code that ensures "fair, transparent, predictable taxation";
- Increased taxes on luxury goods;
- Increased worker salaries by stimulating workplaces with the state support measures;
- Tax exemption in the amount of funds allocate to increase worker wages;
- Increasing the national minimum wage tied with level of inflation from 2025;
- Ensuring growth in the number of employees in small and medium-sized businesses up to 4.7 million;
- Protection of the domestic labour market by ensuring interests of nationalised employees;
- Employing more than 3.3 million citizens (including at least 2.3 million young people);
- Labour legislation reform for the development of newer forms of employment (remote work, flexible working hours, part-time employment, freelancing);
- Adoption of the law "On Public Procurement";
- Ensuring the supply of basic materials at a discount from global market prices to the domestic market used for production of finished goods;
- Formation of a new long-term development plan for large oil projects along with foreign partners;

Agriculture

- Increased priorities to the development of rural villages;
- Developing a Concept for Rural Development;
- Allocation of one trillion tenge for development of agricultural cooperation covering more than one million rural residents;
- Providing preferential conditions for the obtainment agricultural machinery for leasing, micro-loans and access to sales markets in metropolises;
- Involvement of half private subsidiary farms in cooperative entrepreneurship to create 350,000 agricultural jobs;
- Double the total irrigation area to at least 2.2 million hectares;
- Renovate 3,500 km of irrigation canals;
- Construct 25 and renovate 16 built national water reservoirs;

Transport and logistics

- Transforming the Trans-Caspian International Transport Route into the main priority for the diversification of transit and export opportunities;
- Strengthening seaports and fleet to create a modern container hub on the Caspian Sea;
- Launching network of border trade and economic centers with Russia, China, Central Asia and the Caspian Sea region;
- Establishing a Single Digital Green Corridor for transit without restriction of accesses to domestic importers and exporters;
- Repairing 11,000 kilometers of railroads.

Energy

- Provide domestic market with petroleum products by increasing oil production to 21 million tons yearly;
- Diversification of corridors for the export of hydrocarbon raw materials along with oil production increase;
- Construct new gas processing facilities to increase the volume of commercial gas up to 30 billion cubic meters;
- Reaching 60% level of gasification in Kazakhstan;
- Modernise and construct 3.7 GW of power generating capacity and thermal power plants;
- Expanding the share of renewable energy production by 1.5 times.

Regional and infrastructure development

- Constructing 111 million square meters of housing within seven years;
- Finalise the renovation of all problematic residential buildings with equity participation;
- Providing new housing for 40,000 tenants living in dilapidated homes;
- Continued mortgage lending the 7-20-25 program.
- Intensify construction of engineering communications in the areas of mass housing development;
- Ensuring all settlements with running water;
- Reducing wear rate of heating and sanitation networks by 40%;
- High-quality construction and repairment of 8,000 kilometers towards highways of national significance along with 14,000 kilometers of regional and district significance;
- Provide all national and main regional highways with high-quality cellular data and internet connection;
- Attracting new investments in housing and utilities sector under the principle of "tariff in exchange for investment".

Technology

- Gradually increase funding for applied science along with co-financing of scientific research by large businesses;
- Forming conditions for commercialisation of scientific results and scientific-technical activities via the allocation of grants;
- Establish specialised engineering centres at leading universities and large enterprises.

Digitalisation and IT technology

- Providing broadband internet access in cities and regional centers;
- Construct powerful data processing centers and crossborder fiber-optic highways and attract international IT companies;
- Creating 150,000 new jobs related to IT.
