= 2021 Almaty regional election =

Local election in Kazakhstan

- 10 January 2021
- All 45 seats in the Almaty Regional Mäslihat; 23 seats needed for a majority
- Turnout: 73.44%
Party	Leader	Vote %	Seats	+/–
Nur Otan	Daniar Ahmoldaev	75.72%	37	New
Auyl	Qanat Bekiev	8.87%	4	New
People's Party	Saule Bigarova	8.55%	4	New
This lists parties that won seats. See the complete results below.
Acting Secretary before	Secretary
Serik Muqanov; Nonpartisan	Janbolat Jorgenbaev; Nur Otan

Elections to the Almaty Regional Mäslihat was held on 10 January 2021 to elect the members of the 7th Almaty Regional Mäslihat. The election coincided with the 2021 Kazakh local elections and for the first time taken place under the newly proportional representational system.

The Nur Otan (NO) won a majority of 37 out of 45 seats in the mäslihat followed by the Auyl People's Democratic Patriotic Party (AUYL) and People's Party of Kazakhstan (QHP) in which both parties earned 4 seats while 2 other parties failed to pass the electoral threshold to have any presence in the mäslihat.

== Background ==
A new law on local elections was enacted in 2018, which allowed for mäslihat seats to be allocated through party-list proportional representation.

After the announcement of the election date in October 2020 which scheduled all local races to coincide with the legislative elections, the Nur Otan on 16 November 2020 unveiled its list of 90 party members whom were contesting seats for the Almaty Regional Mäslihat despite having only 45 seats, as well as electoral platform for the region which aimed at improving all spheres of human activity, at ensuring an economically sustainable zone, a socially oriented region, open and accountable local bodies, at developing leisure and employment for young people, at preserving the history and culture of the region.

== Parties ==
All 5 contesting parties submitted their lists to the Almaty Regional Electoral Commission which included:

Name		Ideology	No. 1 in party-list	No. of candidates	Registration date
NO	Nur Otan	Big tent	Daniar Ahmoldaev	90	3 December 2020
AUYL	Auyl People's Democratic Patriotic Party	Agrarianism	Qanat Bekiev	6	4 December 2020
QHP	People's Party of Kazakhstan	Socialism	Saule Bigarova	6	4 December 2020
ADAL	Adal	Eco-socialism	Damir Barambaev	5	4 December 2020
AJ	Ak Zhol Democratic Party	Liberalism	Meirash Shynasylova	7	8 December 2020

== Results ==
Party	Votes	%	Seats	+/–
Nur Otan	827,844	80.52	37	+37
Auyl People's Democratic Patriotic Party	91,221	8.87	4	+4
People's Party of Kazakhstan	87,933	8.55	4	+4
Ak Zhol Democratic Party	16,631	1.62	0	0
Adal	4,554	0.44	0	0
Total	1,028,183	100.00	45	0
Valid votes	1,028,183	100.00		
Invalid/blank votes	0	0.00		
Total votes	1,028,183	100.00		
Registered voters/turnout	1,400,038	73.44		
Source: Almaty Regional Election Commission

Popular vote
Nur Otan	80.52%
Auyl	8.87%
People's Party	8.55%
Ak Zhol	1.62%
Adal	0.44%

Mäslihat seats
Nur Otan	82.22%
Auyl	8.89%
People's Party	8.89%
