= 2021 Kazakh local elections =

2021 Kazakh local legislative elections
- 10 January 2021

All 3,246 seats to 214 mäslihats (local assemblies)
- Turnout: 57.26%
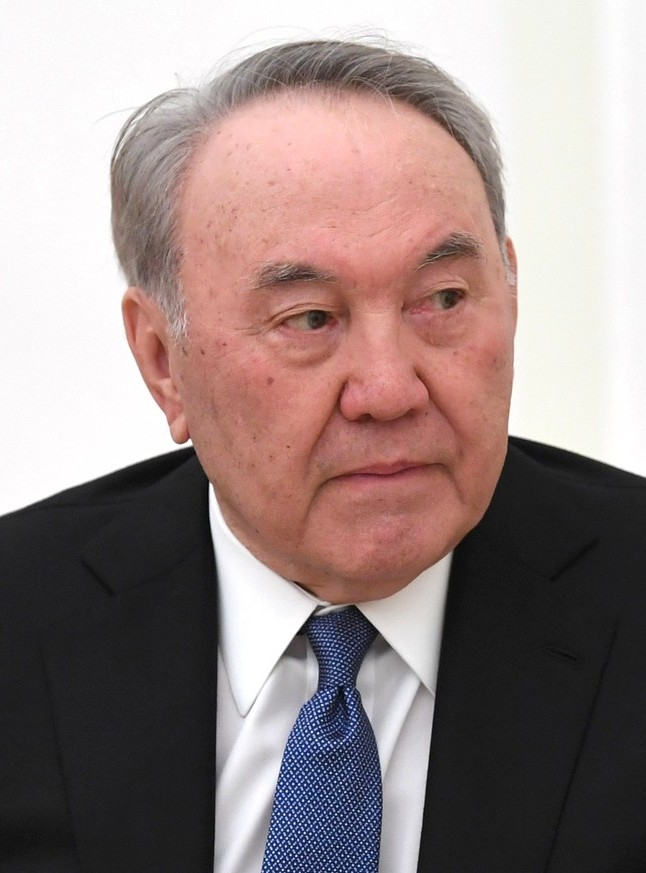

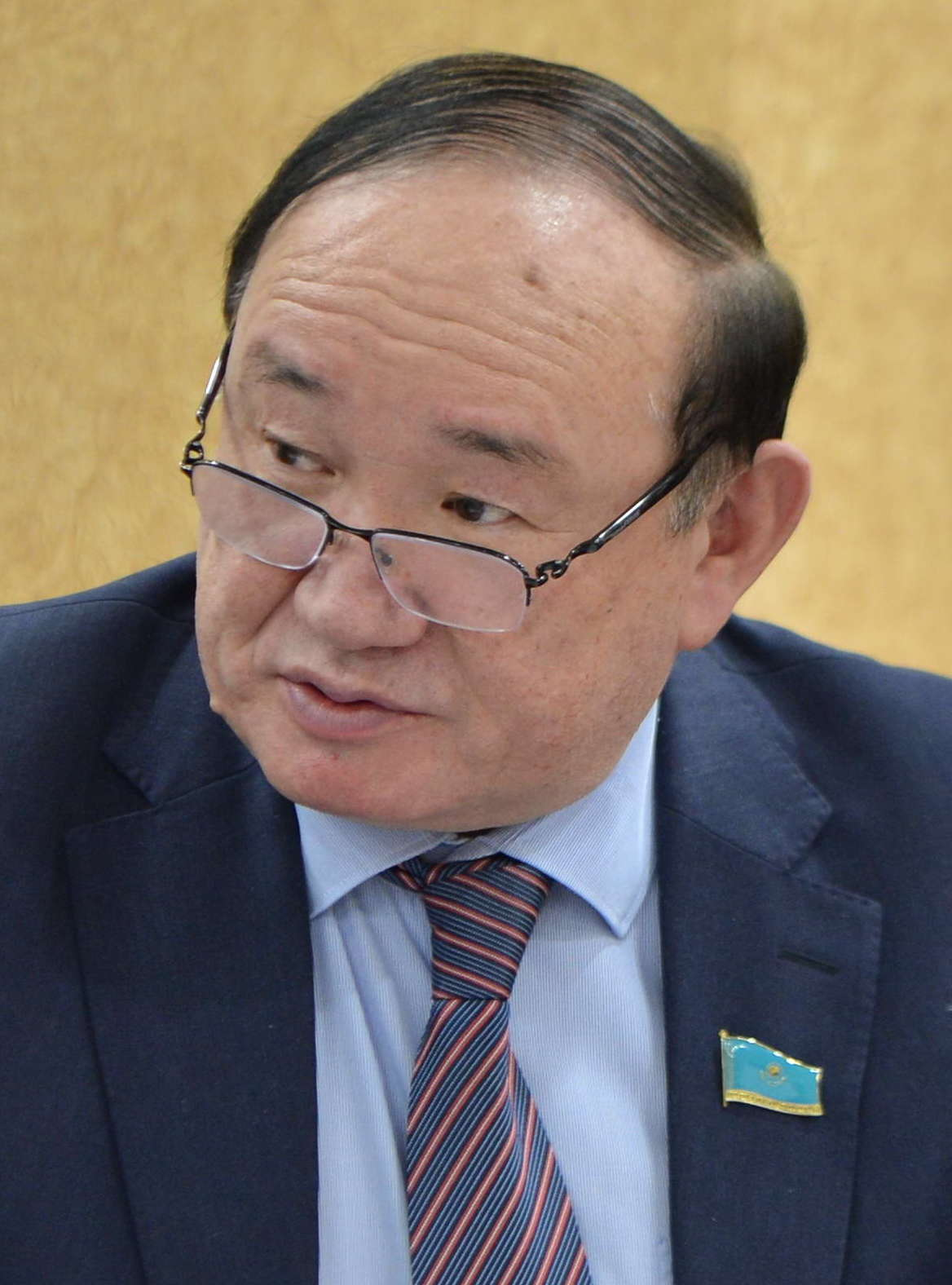

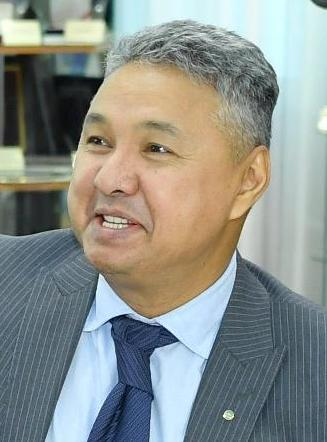

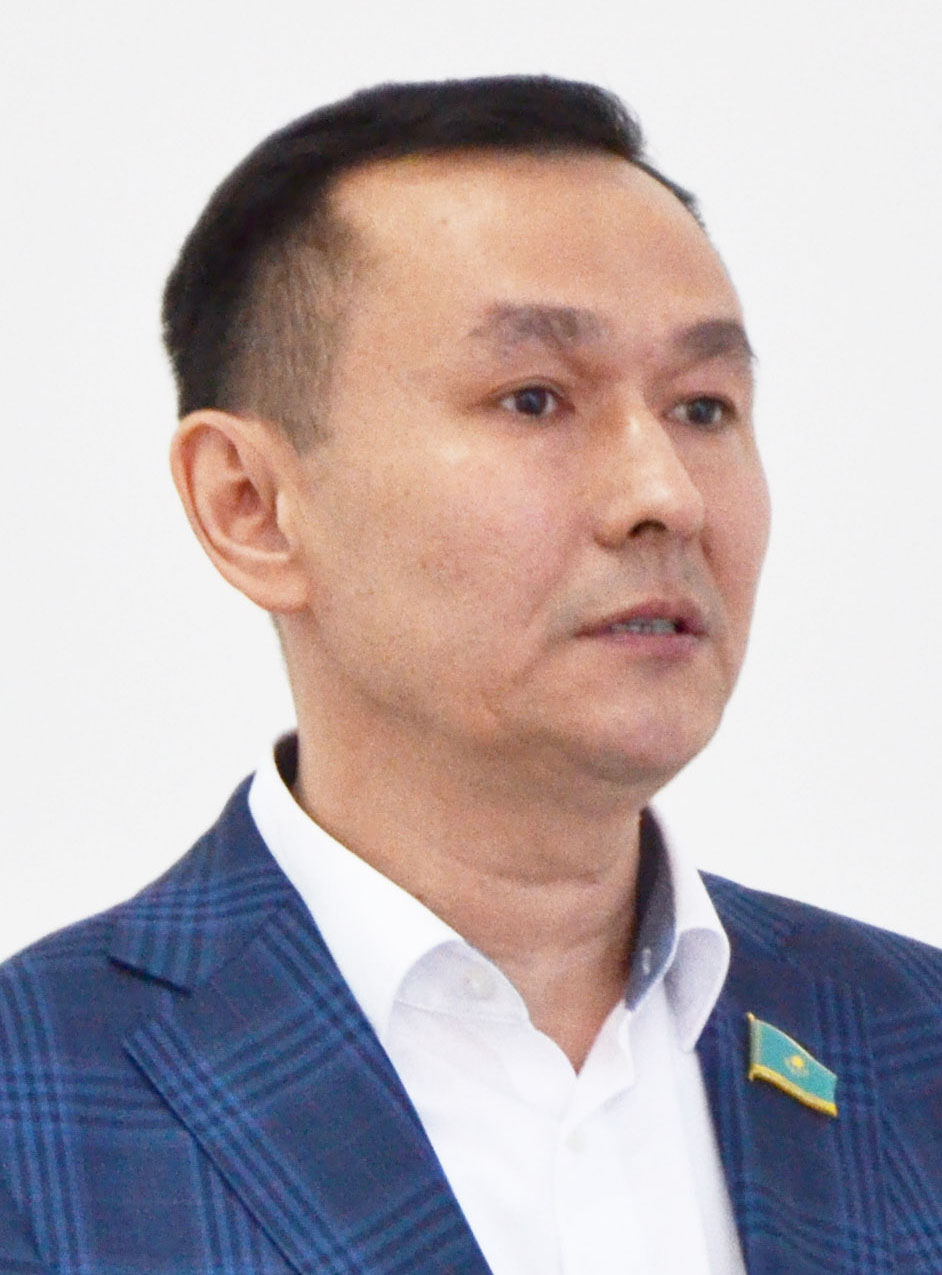
Leader	Nursultan Nazarbayev	Äli Bektaev	Azat Peruashev
Party	Nur Otan	Auyl	Ak Zhol
Leader since	1 March 1999	26 August 2015	2 July 2011
Mäslihats	214	0	0
Members	399 R, 2,286 M	44 R, 183 M	39 R, 185 M
Popular vote*	10,951,426	1,002,799	1,002,184
Percentage	80.23%	7.35%	7.34%
		Adal
Leader	Aiqyn Qongyrov	Serik Sultangali
Party	People's Party	Adal
Leader since	11 November 2020	26 April 2013
Mäslihats	0	0
Members	7 R, 79 M	0 R, 24 M
Popular vote*	406,624	286,531
Percentage	2.98%	2.10%

Local elections were held in Kazakhstan on 10 January 2021 to elect in total of all 3,246 members of the 214 mäslihats (local assemblies) which included 489 regional members and 2,757 municipal members. This is the first election to take place under party-list proportional representation system that was enacted in 2018, giving political parties a role in local races and it coincided with the 2021 legislative elections.

The ruling Nur Otan party swept a majority of 3083 local seats followed by the Auyl People's Democratic Patriotic Party (AUYL) with 268 and the Ak Zhol Democratic Party with 267 and People's Party of Kazakhstan with 107 seats while the Adal, which earned the fewest total votes of 2.1%, had managed to garner 24 seats in the district mäslihats by passing the 7% electoral threshold in some races.

== Background ==
Throughout the history of Kazakhstan, local deputies were elected from single-member districts.

In 2018, the Parliament of Kazakhstan approved a bill that would allow all the members be chosen through party-list proportional representation. According to the Ministry of Justice, "the proportional system will ensure full representation of all political parties, will allow the development of party building, increase the role of parties in the political life of the country and take into account the interests of the people." However, this move was met with skepticism as it would bar self-nominated candidates from running in the races or even being MP of the mäslihat which some accused was a violation of the Constitution.

== Campaign ==
On 10 December 2020, the Central Election Commission (OSK) registered in total of 8,334 candidates competing in the local races that were included in all 832 party lists in which 216 were from Nur Otan, 215 from Adal, 174 from Ak Zhol, 158 from Auyl, 69 from People's Party.

== Results ==
=== Regional ===
==== Overall results ====
Party	Votes	%	Seats	+/–
Nur Otan	5,106,818	80.02	3,083	+3083
Auyl People's Democratic Patriotic Party	542,831	8.51	268	+268
Ak Zhol Democratic Party	480,963	7.54	267	+267
People's Party	137,380	2.15	107	+107
Adal	113,953	1.79	30	+30
Total	6,381,945	100.00	3,755	3,755
Valid votes	6,381,945	97.33		
Invalid/blank votes	175,061	2.67		
Total votes	6,557,006	100.00		

=== Seats earned by region ===
Region	NO	AJ	AUYL	QHP	ADAL	Total
Aktobe	27	3	3	0	0	33
Akmola	26	3	3	0	0	32
Almaty	37	0	4	4	0	45
Atyrau	25	3	3	0	0	31
East Kazakhstan	32	3	3	0	0	38
Jambyl	30	3	3	0	0	36
Karaganda	29	3	3	3	0	38
Kostanay	27	3	3	0	0	33
Kyzylorda	27	3	3	0	0	33
Mangystau	26	3	3	0	0	32
North Kazakhstan	24	3	3	0	0	30
Pavlodar	27	2	3	0	0	32
Turkistan	37	4	4	0	0	45
West Kazakhstan	25	3	3	0	0	31
Total seats:	399	39	44	7	0	489
Source: Turantimes.kz

=== Nationwide results ===
Party	Votes	%	Seats	+/–
Nur Otan	10,951,426	80.23	2,685	+2685
Auyl People's Democratic Patriotic Party	1,002,799	7.35	227	+227
Ak Zhol Democratic Party	1,002,184	7.34	224	+224
People's Party	406,624	2.98	86	+86
Adal	286,531	2.10	24	+24
Total	13,649,564	100.00	3,246	3,246
Valid votes	13,649,564	97.40		
Invalid/blank votes	364,311	2.60		
Total votes	14,013,875	100.00		
Source: Exclusive.kz Territorial Election Commissions
