= Serik Egizbaev =

Kazakh politician

MP Serik Egizbaev
- Серік Егізбаев
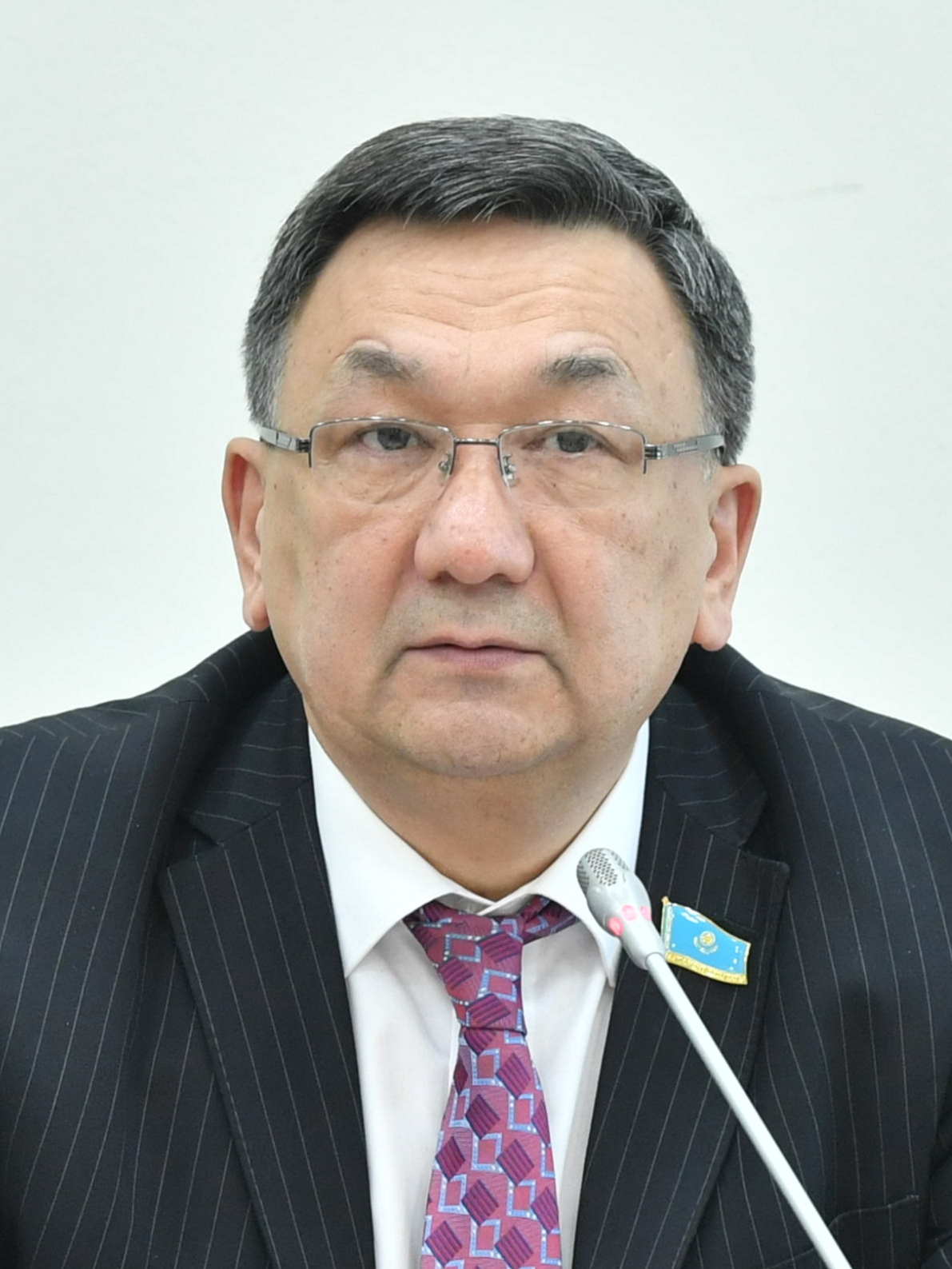
- Egizbaev in 2023

Member of the Kurultai
- Incumbent
- Assumed office 27 August 2026
- Preceded by: Office established
- Constituency: Auyl Party list

Member of the Mäjilis
- In office 28 March 2023 – 1 July 2026
- Constituency: Auyl Party list

Parliamentary leader of Auyl in the Mäjilis
- In office October 2023 – 1 July 2026
- Leader: Himself
- Preceded by: Anas Baqqojaev

Chairman of Auyl
- In office 18 October 2023 – 23 June 2026
- Preceded by: Äli Bektaev
- Succeeded by: Qairat Aituğanov

Deputy Minister of Information and Social Development
- In office May 2021 – February 2023
- Prime Minister: Asqar Mamin; Älihan Smaiylov

Deputy Äkim of West Kazakhstan Region
- In office September 2019 – February 2021
- Äkim: Gali Esqaliev

Deputy Minister of Agriculture
- In office October 2016 – March 2017
- Prime Minister: Bakhytjan Sagintayev

Personal details
- Born: 22 April 1963 (age 63) Şağatay, Oral Region, Kazakh SSR, Soviet Union
- Party: Auyl (since 2019)
- Other political affiliations: Nur Otan (before 2019)

Serık Rahmetollaūly Egızbaev (Note: Often transliterated as Serik Rakhmetollayevich Yegizbayev through a Russified Romanization of Серик Рахметоллаевич Егизбаев.) (Kazakh: Серік Рахметоллаұлы Егізбаев, born 22 April 1963) is a Kazakh politician, who has served as a member of the Kurultai member from the Auyl party list since August 2026.

Before, Egizbaev was a member of the 8th Mäjilis and chairman of the Auyl party from 2023 to 2026.

== Early life and education ==
Born on 22 April 1963, in Şağatay, Chapayev District, Oral Region (now Akzhaik District, West Kazakhstan Region), Serik Egizbaev is an ethnic Kazakh.

In 1985, Egizbaev finished his studies at West Kazakhstan Agro-Technical University, where he became a scientist-agriculturalist. Later, in 1988, he finished studying in the Higher Komsomol School under the Central Committee of the Komsomol. Having finished his studies in 2000 at the State Service Academy under the President of Kazakhstan, he later became a jurist at Maqsut Narikbayev University in 2001. He is a Candidate of Economic Sciences.

== Soviet career ==
Egizbaev started his professional career in 1980, as a worker at a construction site of a state farm in his native Chapayev District, Oral Region. From 1985 to 1986, he was the agriculturalist of the 4th state farm there.

In 1986, Egizbaev started his Komsomol career by becoming the Second Secretary of the Chapayev District Komsomol, a position he held until 1987. Then, he was promoted to First Secretary of the Dzhambeity District Komsomol.

In 1990, he switched to the regional level of the Komsomol, becoming the Secretary of the Oral Regional Committee. Egizbaev was also additionally a delegate in the 17th Assembly of the Kazakh Komsomol.

== Political career ==
Chief of the Oral Regional Komsomol, a position Egizbaev held from 1990, was reformed to First Secretary of the West Kazakhstan Regional Committee of the Union of Youth of Kazakhstan after the 1991 Kazakh Independence. He held the position until 1997.

From 2000 to 2001, Egizbaev was a head of the organizational work department of the Ministry of Finance. From there, until 2007, he served in several minor managerial positions in the Office of the Prime Minister.

In 2007, Egizbaev was appointed to the Presidential Administration of Kazakhstan, as State Inspector, and later as Deputy Head of the Department of State Control and Organizational-Territorial Work. He did this until October 2016, when he was selected as Deputy Minister of Agriculture, a position he held until March 2017.

On 13 March 2017, Egizbaev switched from politics to mass media, as he was Deputy Chairman of the Qazaqstan Radio and Television Corporation on Regional Development. This lasted until September 2019, when he became Deputy Äkim of West Kazakhstan Region. In 2019, he switched his political affiliation from the ruling Nur Otan party to Auyl.

Having served in his native West Kazakhstan Region again until February 2021, he was appointed as Head of the Office of the Ministry of Information and Social Development. Having held the position for only three months, he was Deputy Minister until February 2023.

=== Mäjilis ===
As a result of the 2023 Kazakh legislative election, Egizbaev was elected to the 8th Mäjilis through the Auyl party list on 28 March 2023. The next day, he was selected as Chairman of the Agricultural Issues Committee of the Mäjilis.

As Mäjilisman, Egizbaev has emphasized the needs of Kazakh agriculturalists and farmers and the fauna of the country. He also went on to support the nuclear power plant initiative of the Government.

== Awards and honours ==
Egizbaev's state awards and honors include:

- Medal "10 years of Astana" (2008)
- Medal "20 years to the Assembly of People of Kazakhstan" (2015)
- Medal "20 years to the Constitution of Kazakhstan" (2015)
- Order of Kurmet (2015)
- Medal "25 years to the Independence of Kazakhstan" (2016)
- Medal "25 years to the Constitution of Kazakhstan" (2020)
- Medal "30 years to the Independence of Kazakhstan" (2021)
- Order of Parasat (2022)
- Gratitude from the President of Kazakhstan
- Komsomol Badge "For Active Work in the Komsomol"
