= People's Coalition (Kazakhstan) =

People's Coalition in Support of Kassym-Jomart Tokayev Қасым-Жомарт Тоқаевты қолдау жөніндегі халықтық коалиция
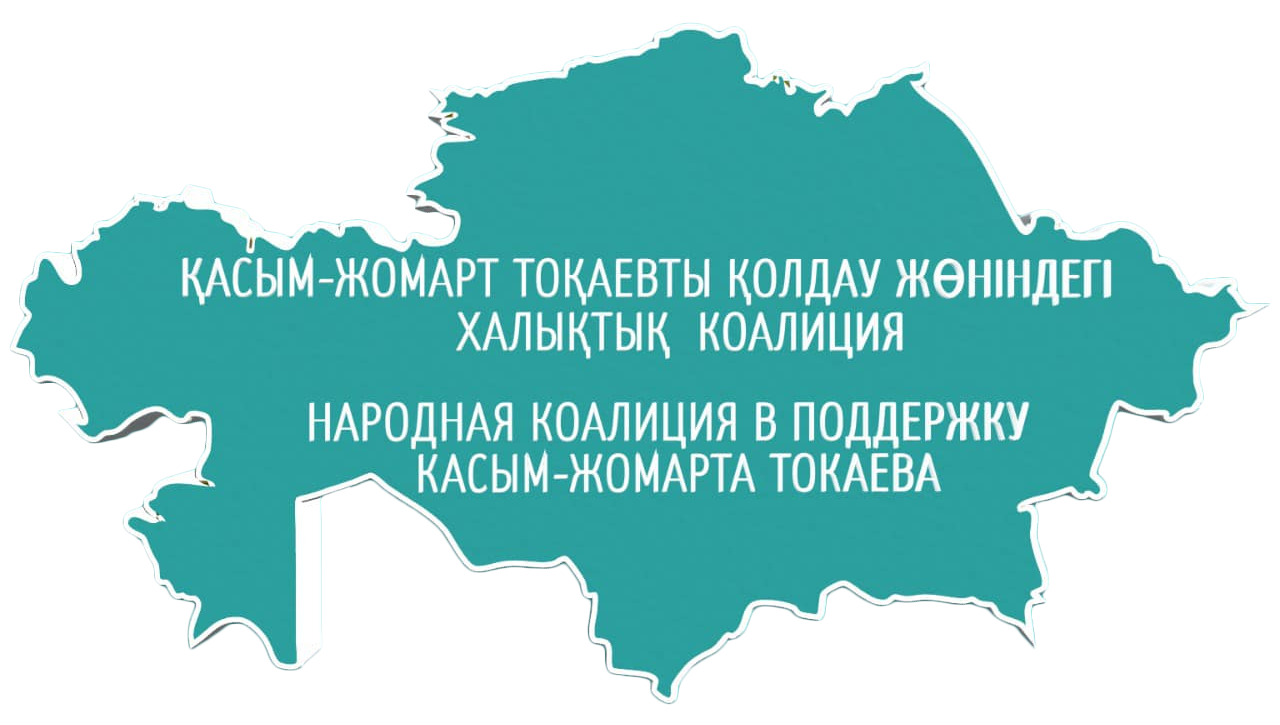
- Logo of the People's Coalition
- Presidential candidate: Kassym-Jomart Tokayev
- Founder: Erlan Qoşanov
- Founded: 6 October 2022
- Dissolved: 22 November 2022
- Headquarters: Astana
- Ideology: Pro-Tokayev
- Political position: Big tent
- Member parties: Amanat; QHP; Aq Jol; others
- Colors: Cyan; White
- Mäjilis: 73 / 98
- Regional mäslihats: 445 / 489
- Municipal mäslihats: 2,588 / 2,757

Website
- Toqaev2022.kz

The People's Coalition (Kazakh: Халықтық коалиция, romanized: Halyqtyq koalitsia, HK; Russian: Народная коалиция, romanized: Narodnaya koalitsiya, NK), officially the People's Coalition in Support of Kassym-Jomart Tokayev (Kazakh: Қасым-Жомарт Тоқаевты қолдау жөніндегі халықтық коалиция, romanized: Qasym-Jomart Toqaevty qoldau jönındegı halyqtyq koalitsiia; Russian: Народная коалиция в поддержку Касым-Жомарта Токаева), was an electoral alliance in Kazakhstan formed on 6 October 2022 from various pro-government political parties and republican public associations in support of incumbent President Kassym-Jomart Tokayev's re-election bid for the 2022 presidential election.

== Background ==
Following the 2022 Kazakh unrest, President Kassym-Jomart Tokayev introduced a set of political reforms in his March 2022 State of the Nation Address, including proposed legislation aimed at restricting his executive powers. One such reform involved making the position of the president non-partisan by prohibiting presidents from holding political party membership while serving office. In line with this change, Tokayev, who had previously run for the presidency as the Amanat party candidate in the 2019 election, left the party in April 2022 by choosing to continue serving as an independent for the remainder of his term.

In September 2022, Tokayev announced a snap election for the presidency in autumn 2022, raising questions about his legal eligibility to run as an independent candidate. This uncertainty arose from 2018 amendment to the Kazakh Law "On Elections" that required presidential candidates to be nominated by a republican public association to qualify for participation. Initially, Tokayev was nominated by the Amanat party on 7 September 2022. Minister of Justice, Qanat Musin, contended that Tokayev had the legal right to be a presidential nominee from any public association, irrespective of his party affiliation. Subsequently, Tokayev received multiple presidential nomination offers from various public associations by early October 2022, prompting him to express his preference for his candidacy to be nominated by a "broad coalition of socio-political forces".

== History ==
On 6 October 2022, the ruling Amanat party chairman Erlan Qoşanov announced the creation of a People's Coalition to support Tokayev in the 2022 presidential election. Political scientists expressed the opinion that the Amanat party would become the core of the coalition.

On the same day, a forum of the People's Coalition was held in Astana, in which representatives of the Amanat, the People's Party and the Aq Jol parties took part. All three parties put forward Tokayev's candidacy for the presidency.

On 7 October, the coalition submitted documents to the Central Election Commission on the behalf for the registration of Tokayev as a presidential candidate. In particular, the package of documents required for registration was provided by the Amanat Party, the People's Party, the Aq Jol, the Organization of Veterans, QAZAQSTAN TEAM, the Association of Maslihat Deputies of Kazakhstan, the Council of Generals, and the Kazakhstan Union of Athletes.

== Composition ==
The coalition includes three political parties,

- Amanat
- Aq Jol Democratic Party
- People's Party of Kazakhstan

and more than 30 republican public associations, of which some notable ones include:

- National Volunteer Network
- Civil Alliance of Kazakhstan
- Qazaqstan Team Youth Association
- Veterans Organization
- Kazakhstan Union of Athletes
- Association of Deputies of Mäslihats of Kazakhstan
- Council of Generals
- "Kazakhstan Ardagerleri" Association
