= Gani Qaliev =

Kazakh economist and politician (1938–2024)

Ğani Qaliev
- Ғани Қалиев

Member of the Mäjilis
- In office 1 December 1999 – 3 November 2004

Personal details
- Born: 19 July 1938 Belbasar, Dzhambul Oblast, Kazakh SSR, USSR
- Died: 12 March 2024 (aged 85)
- Party: "Auyl" HDPP
- Education: Kyrgyz National University
- Occupation: Economist

Ğani Älımūly Qaliev (Kazakh: Ғани Әлімұлы Қалиев; 19 July 1938 – 12 March 2024) was a Kazakh economist and politician. A member of the Auyl People's Democratic Patriotic Party, he served in the Mäjilis from 1999 to 2004.

Qaliev died on 12 March 2024, at the age of 85.
