= Kazakh National Agrarian University =

University in Almaty, Kazakhstan

- Қазақ ұлттық аграрлық университеті
- Type: National
- Established: 1929
- Rector: Tilektes Espolov
- Administrative staff: 1,086
- Location: Abai Avenue, 8, Almaty, Kazakhstan; 43.2419°N 76.9519°E

University rankings

Regional – Overall
- QS Emerging Europe and Central Asia: 79 (2022)

The Kazakh National Agrarian University (Kazakh: Қазақ ұлттық аграрлық университеті, romanized: Qazaq ūlttyq agrarlyq universitetı) is a leading university in Almaty, Kazakhstan that trains specialists for agriculture.

== History ==
=== Alma-Ata Zooveterinary Institute ===
In 1929, the Veterinary Institute was founded to train veterinarians, zoological engineers of a wide profile with specialization in astrakhan, poultry, horse breeding and other specialties. Soon the educational institution was reorganized into the Veterinary-Zootechnical Institute. In 1933, it was renamed into the Alma-Ata Zooveterinary Institute (AZVI).

During World War II, 206 students and employees of the institute volunteered for the front. The title of Hero of the Soviet Union was awarded to one of the 28 Panfilov Guardsmen, an employee of the Institute Alikbai Qosaev and a graduate of the Institute Erdenbek Nietqaliev.

In 1979, AZVI was awarded the Order of the Red Banner of Labour. In 1981–1982, more than 5 thousand students studied at the institute, 314 teachers worked, including 20 professors and doctors of sciences, 170 associate professors and candidates of sciences.

=== Kazakh Agricultural Institute ===
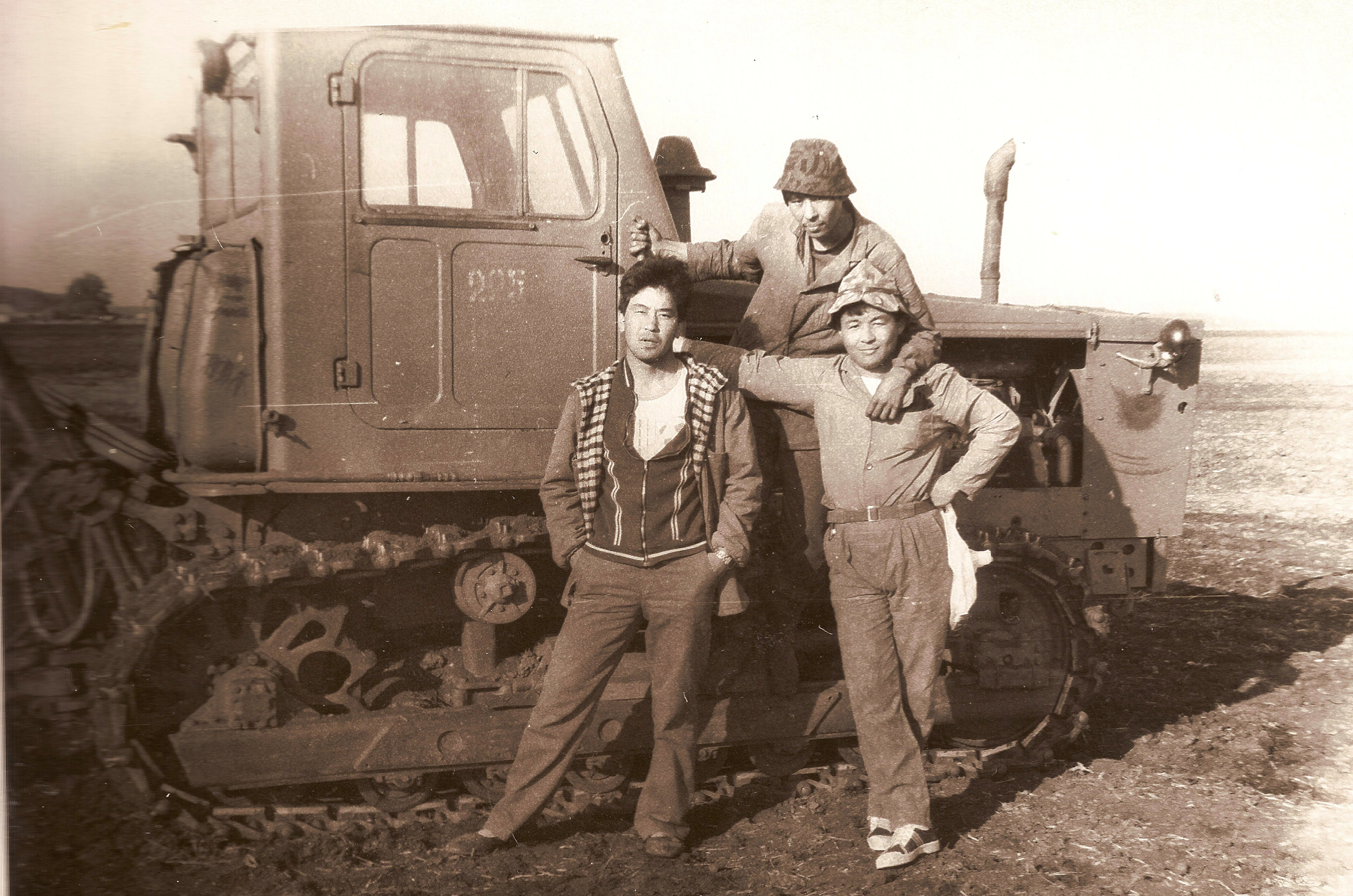
Students from the Kazakh Agricultural Institute at the Novopokrovsky sovkhoz, 1991.

In 1930, the Kazakh Agricultural Institute (KazAI) was founded in Alma-Ata. Initially, the institute had 2 faculties (grain and industrial crops), 11 departments, where 131 students studied, and 42 teachers worked. The first graduation took place in 1933 where 78 people received higher education (including 20 Kazakhs), of whom 51 are agronomists and 27 are fruit growers.

During World War II, about 30 teachers went to the front. During these years, scientists evacuated to Alma-Ata worked at the institute: AI Dushechkin, AA Vasilenko and others. From 1930 to 1950, the institute trained 17 graduates of specialists: 1549 people. Many of them became prominent party and state leaders, heads of farms. In 1950, six faculties began to function within the institute and a five-year term of study was introduced. By 1970, 11,284 students studied at the Kazakh Agricultural Institute, including 4,247 in the full-time department. The teaching staff included 511 people. Personnel training was carried out in 15 specialties. In 1971, Kazakh Agricultural Institute was awarded the Order of the Red Banner of Labour. From 1985 to 1995, the institute had already 12 faculties.

In 1981–1982, over 10 thousand students studied at the institute, 541 teachers worked, including 2 corresponding members of the Academy of Sciences of the Kazakh SSR, corresponding member of the VASKhNIL, 21 professors and doctors of sciences, 222 associate professors and candidates of sciences.

=== Merger and present ===
In 1996, through the merger of the Almaty Zooveterinary and Kazakh Agricultural Institute, the Kazakh State Agrarian University (KazGAU) was created, the rector of which was appointed Academician of the National Academy of Sciences of the Republic of Kazakhstan Kenzhegali Sagadiyev.

In 2001, by the Decree of the President of the Republic of Kazakhstan Nursultan Nazarbayev, the university was assigned a special status of a national higher educational institution.

== Faculties ==
- Faculty of Agrobiology and Phytosanitary
- Faculty of Technology and Bioresources
- Faculty of Veterinary Medicine
- Faculty of forestry, land resources and horticulture
- Faculty of Hydraulic Engineering, Land Reclamation and Business
- Faculty of Engineering

== Campus ==
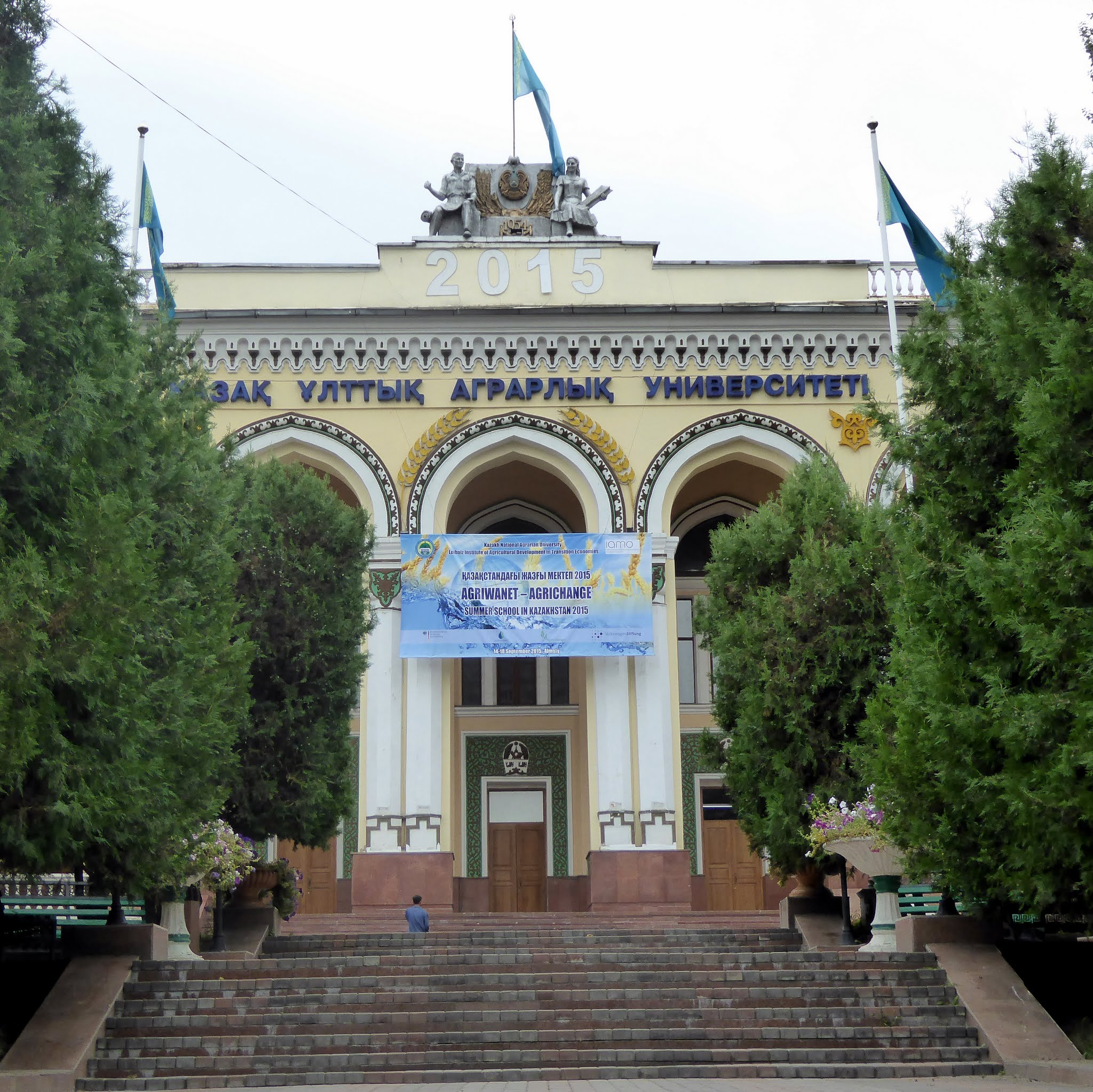
Kazakh Agricultural Institute campus building

The main building of the university was built in two stages in 1934 and 1954. In 1934, according to the project of the architect N. Petrov, the left wing was built, and in 1954 the central part and the right wing of the building were completed according to the design of V. Biryukov. In architectural terms, the building consists of three parts and was built in classic style characteristics with elements of national decor.

There is a portico of the main entrance in front of the central three-story projection. Its piers contain multifaceted paired and single semi-columns with ornamental capitals and developed bases. Arches of the "eastern type" have a complex ornamented archivolt. The developed cornice has two tiers of figured brackets. The central and corner zones of the parapet are deaf. An arched balustrade is placed between them. In the center, above the parapet, there is a two-figured sculptural composition with a coat of arms. The doors behind the portico have a wide ornamented casing. Two-tiered stained-glass windows follow the contour of the arches. The risalit windows outside the portico are rectangular with simple frames. A two-part interfloor belt is located at the level of the third floor window sill. The main volume of the building is two-storied with a plinth passing into the basement. The walls of the basement have a large rustication. In the corners there are three-column porticoes-loggias with square fluted columns and a simple slab capital. The columns are crowned with a multi-stepped developed entablature. Similar columns and pilasters are used in the loggias and in the framing of the stained-glass windows of the vestibules. The windows of the main and side facades have complex-profile platbands. The windows on the courtyard facade are made without platbands. In its central part, the cornice is broken in the form of a semi-pediment, and pseudopilasters with an ornamental cartouche of the capital are made in the piers of the windows.

In early 2000's, a large-scale reconstruction of the main building of the university was carried out, while maintaining the main elements of the facade design.

On 10 November 2010, a new State List of Historical and Cultural Monuments of Local Significance of the city of Almaty was approved, simultaneously with which all previous decisions on this matter were declared invalid. In this Resolution, the status of a local monument of the main building was preserved. The boundaries of the protected zones were approved in 2014.
