= Novopokrovsky =

Rural locality name

Novopokrovsky (Russian: Новопокро́вский; masculine), Novopokrovskaya (Новопокро́вская; feminine), or Novopokrovskoye (Новопокро́вское; neuter) is the name of several rural localities in Russia:

- Novopokrovsky, Novosibirsk Oblast, a settlement in Krasnozyorsky District of Novosibirsk Oblast
- Novopokrovsky, name of several other rural localities
- Novopokrovskaya, a stanitsa in Novopokrovsky District of Krasnodar Krai
- Novopokrovskoye, Moscow Oblast, a village in Kolomensky District of Moscow Oblast
- Novopokrovskoye, name of several other rural localities
