= Mäslihat =

Local parliament in Kazakhstan

A Mäslihat (Kazakh: Мәслихат, [mæs.lɘjˈχɑt]) (Note: Often transliterated as Maslikhat through a Russified Romanization of Маслихат.) is a local representative body (parliament) in Kazakhstan that is elected by a population of a region, district and city.

== Etymology ==
The word mäslihat is derived from the Arabic مَصْلَحَة (maṣlaḥa), meaning "public interest".

== Functions ==
The mäslihats operate at the level of regional and municipality, as well as at the local level such as city or a district. Regional Mäslihats approve and control the local budget, upon the proposal of the President, akim of the region is approved, regional development programs are considered and approved, revision commissions are formed to control the spending of budgetary funds, general developments and development plans are approved, etc. fourth of the total number of its members.

By participating in the work of the mäslihats and its bodies, the MP's solve the most important issues of state, economic, social, cultural construction, adopt by-laws and other decisions, according to their competence, promote their implementation, exercise control over the observance of the laws of Kazakhstan and decisions of local representative and executive bodies.

== Leadership ==
The activities are managed by the secretary of the mäslihat, who works on a permanent basis. The secretary of the mäslihat is elected from among the members in an open or secret ballot by a majority of votes from the total number of MP's. The Secretary is elected for the term of office of 5 years and is the head of the legislative branch of the subdivision.

Candidates for the post of mäslihat secretary are nominated by the MP's at the session. The number of nominated candidates is not limited. Candidates come up with sample programs for their upcoming activities. A candidate is considered elected to the post of secretary of a mäslihat if, as a result of an open or secret ballot, he received a majority of votes from the total number of MP's.

At the time of the session, organizational and administrative functions are performed by the chairman of the mäslihat session.

== Elections ==
Any Kazakh citizen over the age of 20 may be elected as a member of the mäslihat. MP's working on an exempt basis are not entitled to occupy other paid positions, except for teaching, scientific and creative activities, are not entitled to carry out entrepreneurial activities, to be part of the governing or supervisory body of a commercial organization.

Mäslihat MP's are elected by the population on the basis of universal, equal, direct suffrage by secret ballot for a 5-year term according to clause 2 of article 86 of the Constitution, Section VIII "Local government and self-government".
