= Auyl =

Kazakh political party

Auyl Ауыл
- Chairman: Qairat Aituğanov
- Founder: Gani Qaliev
- Founded: 30 January 2000; 26 years ago (as Auyl Peasant Social Democratic Party); 5 September 2015; 10 years ago (as Auyl People's Democratic Patriotic Party)
- Merger of: Party of Patriots of Kazakhstan (since 2015)
- Headquarters: Astana
- Membership (2023): 301,487
- Ideology: Social democracy Agrarianism
- Political position: Centre-left
- Colours: Dark green Gold
- Kurultai: 10 / 145
- Regional mäslihats: 44 / 489
- Municipal mäslihats: 183 / 2,757

Website
- auyl.kz

The Auyl Party (Note: Kazakh: «Ауыл» партиясы, romanized: «Auyl» partiasy; lit. 'Village', Kazakh pronunciation: [ɑwəl], AH-wəl) is a political party in Kazakhstan. It was originally founded by Gani Qaliev on 30 January 2000 before eventually merging with the Party of Patriots of Kazakhstan on 5 September 2015. The party is led by Qairat Aituğanov. With a membership of around 300,000 people, Auyl has participated in every Kazakh parliamentary election since 2004 and nominated presidential candidate Toleutai Raqymbekov in the 2019 presidential election. It first entered the Mäjilis at the 2023 legislative election, winning eight seats and becoming the largest opposition party.

The Auyl declared its main values of spirituality, patriotism, loyalty, equality, cooperation. Basing its principles of social democracy, the party spoke out in favour of the rural population's interests by seeing its priorities as strengthening state regulation and supporting the agricultural economy, protecting the interests of rural workers, actively promoting the implementation of economic and political reforms aimed at further democratization of society, the implementation of justified forms of market relations in all sectors of the economy, improving the living standards of citizens, as well as the formation of patriotic education of the population. It is supportive of incumbent President Kassym-Jomart Tokayev, and has been accused of being controlled opposition and a front for agribusiness.

The party outlined its goal to promote the construction of an independent strong and prosperous Kazakhstan, with a high standard of living for all Kazakhstanis, in order to embark on the path of globalization, preserve the national spirit, cultural and spiritual potential and traditions, language and religion, as well as be open to new technologies.

== History ==
=== 2000–2015 ===
Old logo used by Auyl until 2015.

The Auyl party formed in its 1st Congress on 30 January 2000 as the Auyl Peasant Social Democratic Party where Mazhilis MP Gani Qaliev was elected as the party's chairman. There were over 10,000 party members, mainly agriculture workers and farm managers. The party was eventually renamed into the Auyl Kazakhstani Social Democratic Party. It went through registrations in March 2000, March 2002, and April 2003.

The party participated for the first time in the 2004 Kazakh legislative election where it received on 1.7 of the vote and won no seats.

In the 2007 general elections, the Auyl campaigned on the issues of low standard of living, pointing out that residents in rural areas' incomes are two to three times lower than average salary; from there, the Auyl called for increase of monthly income of more than 30,000 tenge per person. The party pledged to implement policies that would make every person in Kazakhstan feel like a "full citizen". In the electoral results, the Auyl received 1.51% of the vote, failing to break the 7% electoral threshold, which was unable to enter the Mazhilis, along with all other contesting parties latter ruling Nur Otan party.

After the announcement of a snap 2011 presidential elections, the party's chief of staff, Janibek Nagimetov, said that the Auyl would nominate its candidate. But the party subsequently did not participate in these elections.

On 2 December 2011, at the eighth Auyl Extraordinary Congress held in Astana which was attended by over 120 delegates. The party list as candidates for MP's of the Mazhilis for the 2012 general elections included 23 people who were cultural figures, academicians, scientists, heads of farms. According to the approved platform of the party, the main tasks were “a food basket for rural residents and the provision of clean drinking water along with the development of rural infrastructure (construction and repair of housing, schools, hospitals, roads)”. On 10 December, the Central Election Commission (OSK) registered the party list, which included 18 people. On 17 January 2012, the OSK announced the final results of the elections where the Auyl gained 1.19% and did not enter the Parliament. In a statement signed by the chairman of the Auyl, Gani Qaliev, it was noted that the elections were held without surprises. “Everyone knew that the Nur Otan party of power, headed by the Leader of the Nation [Nursultan Nazarbayev] would win."

On 26 August 2015, at the tenth Extraordinary Congress, Gani Qaliev resigned as chairman and was succeeded by Äli Bektaev who was elected as the new chairman of Auyl.

=== 2015–present: Merger with QPP and recent activities ===
Old logo used by Auyl until 2024.

On 5 September 2015, the 11th Auyl Extraordinary Congress was held in Astana where a proposal made by the Party of Patriots of Kazakhstan (QPP) regarding the merger of both parties was adopted, forming the Auyl People's Democratic Patriotic Party (Kazakh: «Ауыл» Халықтық-демократиялық патриоттық партиясы, romanized: «Auyl» Halyqtyq-demokratialyq patriottyq partiasy; "Auyl" HDDP). According to Auyl chairman Äli Bektaev, the decision on uniting parties would give impetus to their work, solve the problems of their supporters more effectively, and protect the interests of ordinary Kazakhstanis at all levels of government, and respond more effectively to the needs of citizens. Bektaev himself was elected as the new party's leader while former QPP chairman Tolymbek Gabdilashimov became the first deputy chairman of the Auyl.

Following the party's formation in result of a merger, it was speculated that the decision was a sign of a potential upcoming snap election that would be held for Mazhilis with political scientist claiming that the Auyl's decision in unifying with the QPP was made based on the merits by the Kazakh authorities. During the 2016 legislative elections, the party held its 12th Extraordinary Congress where the Auyl unveiled its list of 19 candidates and the electoral platform called "Ауыл дәстүріне қайта оралайық" ("Let's go back to rural traditions") which stressed problems regarding the effective land use, the weak use of modern innovative technologies, and the development of new varieties and breeds in animal husbandry. The party also proposed to merge all loan programs into one–for the development of agricultural production. In the electoral results, the party performed usually better, gaining higher vote share of 2.0% and taking fourth place, ahead of the Nationwide Social Democratic Party although garnering no seats. The Auyl acknowledged the results, with party chairman Äli Bektaev saying that "the elections were held in equal competition. All political parties had equal opportunities to conduct an agitation campaign."

In April 2019, the Auyl for the first time nominated Toleutai Raqymbekov as a candidate for the 2019 presidential elections. Raqymbekov won 3.04 of the vote and earned fourth place in the race. Shortly after the election, the Auyl, along with other members of the National Coalition of Democratic Forces, highly appreciated the open and competitive nature of the presidential election.

At its 16th Ordinary Congress held on 27 November 2019 in Nur-Sultan, the Auyl discussed its work that had done in 2015–2019 as well as problems within agro-industrial complex, the social sphere, science and production. An election was held for the chairman of the party, members of the political council, and changes and additions were made to its charter.

On 9 September 2020, the Auyl held its 17th Extraordinary Congress on regarding the proposal by the Birlik to unite with the party where a majority of Auyl delegates voted against in which according to Quanyş Setijanov the decision by the party was made due to Birlik's low political activity and inconsistency in the party's branches as well as lack of change in Birlik's platforms, stressing that uniting with the party would not add popularity to Auyl. Birlik chairman Serik Sultangali slammed Auyl's decision, criticising it for improving the situation within the agricultural sector nor becoming a "think tank" or "manifesting" itself during the COVID-19 pandemic.

At the 2021 legislative elections, the 18th Auyl Extraordinary Congress took place on 18 November 2020 where chairman Äli Bektaev stressed the need for the party to enter the Parliament in order to raise rural issues where he pointed out the low quality of life within it. From there, the Auyl proposed to create long-term loan towards agricultural producers with an annual payment of 2% in an attempt to increase agricultural production. At the Congress, the party presented its list of 19 candidates of which were journalists, scientists, poets and entrepreneurs. In the results, the Auyl fared better than before, sweeping 5.3% of the vote although still unable to reach 7% electoral threshold. In result of the exit polls, Bektaev proclaimed that the legislative elections were held legally, noting that they should help the furthering development and prosperity of Kazakhstan. At the opening of the 7th Parliament on 15 January 2021, President Kassym-Jomart Tokayev proposed to reduce the electoral threshold from 7% to 5% in which the proposed law was later ratified in May 2021, and would have given the Auyl chance to win seats in the Mazhilis had the threshold barrier reduction to 5% been adopted before the elections.

In the 2023 Kazakh legislative election, the Ayul won 10.90% of the vote with 8 seats, the first time in the party's history it was able to enter the Mäjilis.

At the XXIV Party Congress on 21 June 2024, the party's name was changed to simply "Auyl Party". A new logo and visual style for the party were also presented.

== Ideology ==
The Auyl aims achieve a high standard of living for all Kazakhstani citizens with an ensured civilian rights and freedoms, political stability and social protection for persons regardless of their place of residence and the party has supported for traditionalism, which stated that its existence should be based in villages (in Kazakh, auyl. Economically, the Auyl advocated for social democracy to which it claimed that the system has "traditionally been based throughout the world".

In the party's programme, it called for more democratic reforms in Kazakhstan as well as the separation of powers, better organised fight against the corruption to which it compared it as "ulcers on the body, corroding our society", and has supported for Kazakhstan's entry to World Trade Organization. The Auyl more specifically outlined rural problems in its agrarianist ideology, which aimed to protect the political rights and economic interests of rural residents by implementing social development of villages and increasing state support for agriculture. The party claimed its policies were aimed at preventing flow of people from moving to urban areas, stressing that it would lead to labour shortage within the rural areas.

The party is viewed to be loyal to the government with Auyl chairman Gani Qaliev in a 2015 interview admitting that the party supported President Nursultan Nazarbayev, claiming that he follows Auyl's interests, pointing out the fact that Nazarbayev himself was born in the rural village. Qaliev also stated that the Auyl supported a presidential system of government in Kazakhstan, outlining to be an effective form of governance.

=== Social issues ===
The Auyl believes that anyone earning living through work has the right to decent work and social protection and has called for constant pensions, deposits and social benefits changes to levels that would provide citizens specifically the socially vulnerable ones a decent life. For rural settlements, the party aims to create high-quality living conditions within the countryside by construction and repairs of infrastructure located within the areas.

The party in its programme proclaimed that a "responsible parenthood is healthy, prosperous and intelligent children, which means the quality of all our people." In terms of Family and Marriage Code, the Auyl called for its modernisation by increasing monthly child benefits and extending parental leave. The party also proposed in creating a separate law in expanding the meaning of "young family" and strengthening public control over compliance with law on the rights and guarantees of working women.

=== Education ===
The Auyl called for changes in general education by introducing new subjects in the curriculum, increasing the duration of training, citing that the number of school hours lead to overload of students and deterioration of their health. The party proposed a series of special quotes and benefits for rural graduates attending universities as well as for businesses to increase scholarships and guaranteed loans for education.

=== Healthcare ===
The Auyl proposed to increase public spending on health with World Health Organization (WHO) guidelines to 5% of Kazakhstan's GDP with an addition funding coming through excise taxes of tobacco and alcoholic beverage sales as well as deductions from the income of the gambling businesses. The party called for increased availability of medical care for rural residents and proposed to establish a special institutional commission on rights of people with disabilities to monitor the implementation of the Convention on the Rights of Persons with Disabilities.

=== State language ===
The Auyl outlined its goal in popularising the Kazakh language by increasing its availability in education and entertainment and proposed to introduce a mandatory Kazakhstani citizenship exam for persons on the knowledge of Kazakh.

== Criticism ==
The Auyl was accused as being "fodder" for the ruling Nur Otan party in which according to Project — Vedomosti Kazakhstan journal that the party's programmes were similar to Nur Otan's regarding on rural policies. In spite claiming to represent rural workers, the party was criticised for not focusing on the interests towards small and medium-sized farmers and instead cooperating with the Alliance of Associations of the Agro-Industrial Complex of Kazakhstan which was viewed to be owned by group of Kazakh oligarchs with Umirzak Shukeyev being the most beneficiary figure in organisation.

== Electorate and membership ==
The Auyl claimed to encompass its support from residents of villages and cities, workers of agriculture and industry, students and scientists, and creative intelligentsia who opted for a social economic state, moral and development of society, and the preservation of the country's traditional and spiritual wealth. The party was estimated to have around 200,000 members in 2015.

== Electoral history ==
=== Presidential elections ===
Election	Candidate	Votes	%	Votes	%	Result
Election	Candidate	First round		Second round		Result
2015	Supported Nursultan Nazarbayev	8,833,250	97.8	—N/a		Won
2019	Toleutai Raqymbekov	280,451	3.04	—N/a		Lost
2022	Jiguli Dairabaev	271,641	3.42	—N/a		Lost

=== Parliamentary elections ===
==== Mäjilis elections ====
Election	Party leader	Votes	%	Seats	+/–	Position	Outcome
2004	Gani Qaliev	82,523	1.73%	0 / 77	New	▲7th	Extra-parliamentary
2007	Gani Qaliev	89,855	1.51%	0 / 98	0	▲4th	Extra-parliamentary
2012	Gani Qaliev	82,623	1.19%	0 / 98	0	▼5th	Extra-parliamentary
2016	Äli Bektaev	151,285	2.01%	0 / 98	0	▲4th	Extra-parliamentary
2021	Äli Bektaev	383,023	5.29%	0 / 98	0	4th	Extra-parliamentary
2023	Äli Bektaev	693,938	10.90%	8 / 98	▲8	▲2nd	Opposition

==== Kurultai elections ====
Election	Party leader	Votes	%	Seats	+/–	Position	Outcome
2026	Qairat Aituğanov	574,621	6.26%	10 / 145	▲2	2nd	
