= 2021 Kazakh legislative election =

- 10 January 2021

98 of the 107 seats in the Mäjilis 54 seats needed for a majority
- Registered: 11,919,241
- Turnout: 63.25% (▼13.87pp)
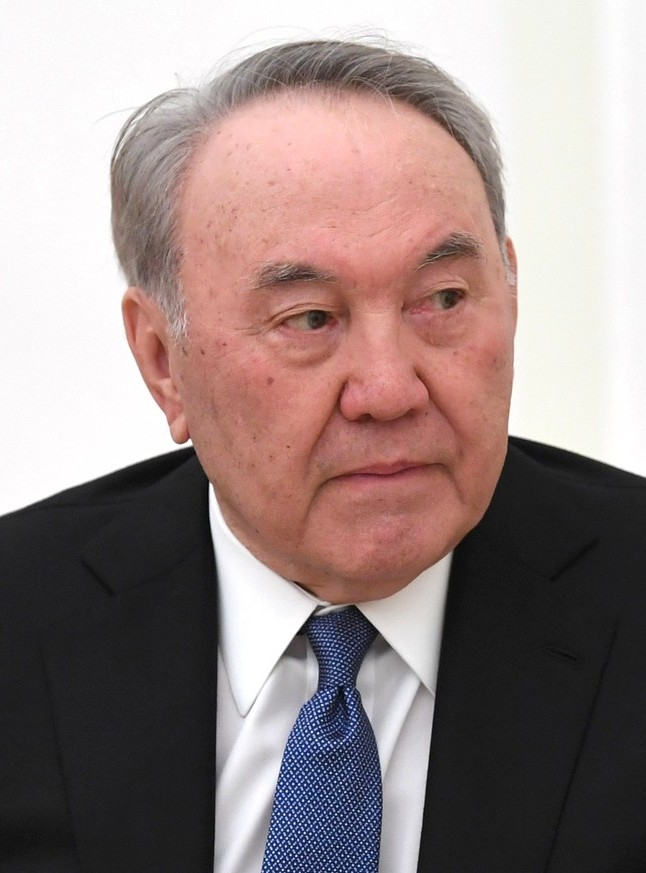

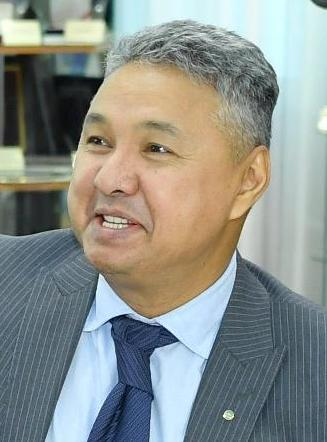

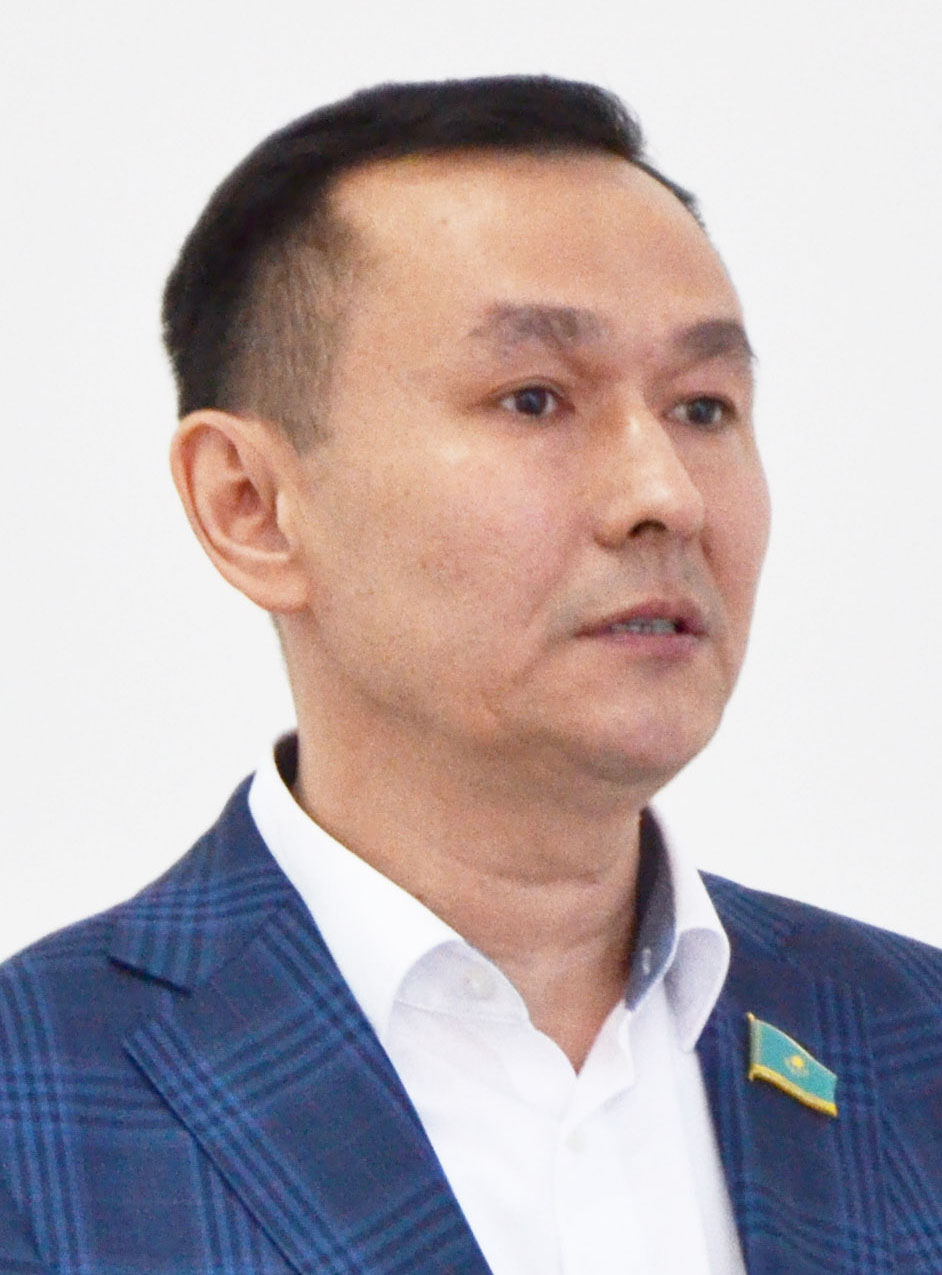
	Majority party	Minority party	Third party
Leader	Nursultan Nazarbayev	Azat Peruashev	Aiqyn Qongyrov
Party	Nur Otan	Aq Jol	QHP
Last election	82.20%, 84 seats	7.18%, 7 seats	7.14%, 7 seats
Seats won	76	12	10
Seat change	▼8	▲5	▲3
Popular vote	5,148,074	792,828	659,019
Percentage	71.09%	10.95%	9.10%
Swing	▼11.11pp	▲3.77pp	▲1.96pp
- Results by region
Chairman before election
Nurlan Nigmatulin
Nur Otan
Elected Chairman
Nurlan Nigmatulin
Nur Otan

Legislative elections were held in Kazakhstan on 10 January 2021 to elect the members of the Mäjilis to the 7th Parliament of Kazakhstan. They were the eighth legislative elections in Kazakhstan's history since independence and coincided with the 2021 local elections. The elections were the first to be held under Kassym-Jomart Tokayev's presidency and the first since 2004 to be held at the normally scheduled date, rather than due to an early dissolution of the Mäjilis.

The ruling Nur Otan party maintained its dominant party status in the Mäjilis by winning 71.1% of the vote and sweeping 76 seats; however, it fared worse than the prior election in 2016, losing 8 seats and 11.1% of votes, while two parties nominally in the opposition (Aq Jol and People's Party of Kazakhstan, present in the Mäjilis since 2012, performed better, each seeing a small gain in votes and seats. Despite some expectations, the other contesting parties failed to reach the 7% electoral threshold, and thus were not able to enter the Parliament. Several opposition groups called for a boycott and protests in the elections, citing lack of openness and fairness. The only registered party which poses true opposition to the government, the Nationwide Social Democratic Party, for the first time in a legislative election refused to contest the race, while other groups encouraged to tactically vote for the Aq Jol to at least draw away some votes from Nur Otan. The legislative election saw a voter turnout of 63.3%, the lowest since 1999. The Assembly of People of Kazakhstan indirectly elected its allotted nine members to the Mäjilis on 11 January 2021.

Campaigning was focused on issues such as reforms enacted by President Tokayev, economic hardships caused by the COVID-19 pandemic, social issues, land sales and the agricultural sector. The election was plagued by several corruption scandals regarding former president Nursultan Nazarbayev's circles, diplomatic issues between Kazakhstan and Russia over controversial land claims, as well as pressure and crackdowns on human rights groups, journalists, activists, and election observers. The Parliamentary Assembly of the Organization for Security and Co-operation in Europe (OSCE) called the elections as "low-key" with lack of "genuine competition", as all the contesting parties supported Tokayev's policies or espoused pro-government positions.

On election day unsanctioned protests resulted in detentions of people across the cities of Kazakhstan. The Kazakh Ministry of Internal Affairs said that all participants were released with no charges.

The new session of the Mäjilis first convened on 15 January 2021. From there, Nurlan Nigmatulin was reelected as the Mäjilis Chair while Askar Mamin was reappointed as the Prime Minister after being nominated by Tokayev to the post.

== Background ==
=== Tokayev's presidency and reforms ===
Following the 2016 legislative election, the ruling Nur Otan party maintained its supermajority control of the lower house Mäjilis in the 6th Parliament of Kazakhstan, which it has held since 2007. After Nursultan Nazarbayev's resignation from the presidency on 20 March 2019 and the snap presidential elections which were held on 9 June 2019, newly elected President Kassym-Jomart Tokayev in his inauguration on 12 June promised a continuation of Nazarbayev's policies in the country's development and social and economic reforms. Despite resigning from office, Nazarbayev still holds the title of "Elbasy" ("Leader of the Nation"), and remains chairman of the Security Council of Kazakhstan for life, is the Nur Otan party chairman, and a Constitutional Council member, while his eldest daughter Dariga Nazarbayeva held the post of Senate Chair, the second line of succession in the country after the President. Many analysts considered that Tokayev's presidency would be temporary, and would only serve as a bridge for an eventual transition of power to Nazarbayeva.

Throughout the course of his presidency, Tokayev proposed numerous reforms, such as laws on public rallies which excluded provisions requiring official approval, reducing the required number of members in political parties to be registered, offenses such as slander and libel being removed, and hate speech laws being more specific and less harsh. After the adoption of the law in May 2020, it received criticism from Kazakh and international human rights activists, who noted that the newly reformed rules still fell short of international standards, such as barring non-Kazakh citizens from organizing and joining protests and limiting public assemblies to only designated locations.

On 21 October 2020, President Tokayev signed the decree setting a date for the legislative elections to be held on 10 January 2021, outlining that the Parliament will focus on "quality legislative support for social and economic reforms in the country."

=== COVID-19 pandemic ===
Talk arose of possible snap legislative elections, with Tokayev announcing a possibility they would be held in April 2020. However, after the outbreak of COVID-19 in Kazakhstan in March 2020, which resulted in nationwide lockdowns and quarantine measures, the idea of an early election was put aside as Kazakh authorities were forced to contain the spread of the virus. Tokayev instructed the government to implement certain fiscal packages, such as increasing state pensions and welfare payouts by 10%, providing more tax breaks for small businesses and boosting spending on subsidies in order to limit the economic impacts of the virus. He also called for monthly pay of 42,500 ₸ per person with kits including food products and other basic necessities. On 11 May 2020, Kazakhstan ended the state of emergency it had put into place to contain the virus, allowing its regions to slowly lift their own lockdowns. However, after an increase of COVID-19 cases, Tokayev announced a second lockdown on 29 June 2020 which became effective starting 5 July 2020. During that period, the Chinese embassy in Kazakhstan announced that an "unknown pneumonia" was spreading throughout the country, and claimed it was deadlier than COVID-19. The Kazakh Ministry of Healthcare dismissed those claims, stating that the unspecified pneumonia was likely COVID-19, based on symptoms, but was not confirmed by laboratory testing that followed World Health Organization (WHO) guidelines. The WHO in a press briefing on 10 July 2020, expressed its belief that the unspecified pneumonia cases were most likely un-diagnosed COVID-19 cases. The nationwide lockdowns in Kazakhstan were originally set to end on 19 July, but were extended twice and eventually lifted on 19 August 2020. Despite relief efforts by authorities, Kazakhstan's GDP throughout the course of the pandemic shrunk by 1.8% and the unemployment rate reached 5%. The total unemployment rate, including discouraged workers, increased to 10.8%. The monthly stimulus pay enacted in March was criticized as too little to cover the cost of living in cities such as Almaty and Nur-Sultan.

=== Corruption scandals ===
==== Utemuratov case ====
The Wall Street Journal reported on 1 December 2020 that the Courts of England and Wales had frozen the equivalent of US$5 billion in assets connected to Bulat Utemuratov (former president Nursultan Nazarbayev's aide), including stakes in luxury hotels, cash in bank accounts in half a dozen countries, and a Burger King franchise, in a settlement made by BTA Bank. Mukhtar Ablyazov, exiled former Kazakh banker and politician currently residing in France, denied the allegations of the case filed as well by the bank, calling it a plot to discredit Utemuratov as "political heavyweight and rival in the fight for power" instigated by the National Security Committee Chairman and former PM Karim Massimov.

Negotiations between representatives of Utemuratov and BTA Bank resulted in a confidential agreement, in which the bank undertook to withdraw its claim. Under the agreement, the English court removed restrictions on Utemuratov's assets on 9 December.

==== Kulibayev's money laundering ====
On 3 December 2020, the Financial Times reported that Nazarbayev's son-in-law Timur Kulibayev had allegedly received tens of millions of dollars in a secret project related to the construction of a natural gas pipeline from Central Asia to China. The report said that Kulibayev had arranged contracts in which the Moscow-based Alexander Karmanov-owned ETK received US$53 million in a hidden scheme with parts of profit being laundered to Kulibayev's company.

In response to the laundering claims, it was reported on 8 December that Kulibayev had dismissed these reports and called on Prosecutor General's Office of Kazakhstan to investigate these allegations.

==== Real estate assets owned by Nazarbayev's family ====
On 22 December, Radio Azattyq, a Kazakh service of RFE/RL, published investigative reporting on real estate assets owned by Nazarbayev relatives, such as a luxury hillside villa in Cannes owned by his brother Bolat and ex-wife, and an apartment overlooking Central Park in New York City, a luxurious oceanfront estate in Costa Brava, Spain belonging to his son-in-law Timur Kulibayev which Nazarbayev himself had reportedly visited, as well as several real estate properties in United Kingdom owned by Dariga Nazarbayeva and her son Nurali which the British National Crime Agency suspected were bought from illegal sources of funds. The charges were dismissed by the High Court of Justice in April 2020. The total value of the properties was estimated at US$785 million.

=== Controversies regarding Kazakhstan's integrity ===
On the 10 December 2020 Channel One Russia program, Vyacheslav Nikonov, chairman of the Committee on Education and Science of the State Duma and grandson of prominent Soviet politician Vyacheslav Molotov, made a controversial claiming that most of present-day Kazakhstan is uninhabited, specifically the northern part of the country, and that its territory was a "great gift" from Russia and the Soviet Union. As a result, Nikonov received a huge backlash on social media from Kazakh users, who accused him of being ignorant and attempting to start a clamor around himself. The Kazakh Ministry of Foreign Affairs protested the claims made by Nikonov in a letter given to Russian ambassador Aleksander Komarov, warning that "increasingly frequent provocative insinuations by some Russian politicians regarding Kazakhstan are seriously harming our states' friendly relations." The Ministry called for the Russian government to take measures to prevent further controversial statements by Russian politicians. On 12 December, Nikonov made a public apology on his Telegram channel for his words, saying "I believe that the interests of Kazakhstan were fully observed when defining the borders of the Kazakh SSR, which became the borders of the Republic of Kazakhstan." However, the following day on 13 December, Russian nationalist and State Duma member of parliament (MP) Yevgeny Fyodorov supported Nikonov's original claims at the Belarusinfo YouTube channel, saying that Kazakhstan "should be grateful for the gift", referring to the country's territory, and stated that Kazakhstan should return some of its territories if it does not acknowledge them as "gifts from Russia". Former president Nursultan Nazarbayev, in response to the territorial claims, fired back in a speech made on 15 December commemorating Independence Day, where he said that Kazakhs are "the descendants of brave ancestors who inhabited a vast valley from Altai to Atyrau, and from Alatau to Arka." Kazakh Foreign Minister Mukhtar Tleuberdi dismissed Nikonov and Fyodorov's statements on 23 December, calling them "bullshit" and noted that the controversy "does not correspond to the official position of the Russian Federation." He added that Kazakhstan has friendly relations with Russia and will continue to develop ties based on international laws.

On 5 January 2021, President Kassym-Jomart Tokayev wrote in the state-run newspaper Yegemen Qazaqstan that "our sacred land, inherited from our ancestors, is our main wealth. No one from the outside gave this vast territory to the Kazakhs." He also added that Kazakh lands would never be sold or rented by foreigners.

== Electoral system ==
Under Article 85 of the Constitutional Law "On Elections", the legislative elections in Kazakhstan for the Mäjilis members, who are referred to as deputies, are held within five years after the expiration of a legal term length for Mäjilis deputies. In accordance with Article 51 of the Constitution, a person must be at least 25 years or older and had been a permanent resident for the last ten years in Kazakhstan to serve as a member of the Mäjilis.

The 107-seat Mäjilis consists of 98 deputies elected from a single nationwide constituency by proportional representation and nine seats indirectly elected by the Assembly of People of Kazakhstan, a body selected by the president. The directly elected seats are filled using a 7% electoral threshold and allocated using the largest remainder method. If parties have an equal largest remainder, the party that was registered first is awarded the seat. If only one party crosses the threshold, the party with the second highest number of votes is awarded at least two seats.

=== Procedure ===
Official election logo

In the 2021 Mäjilis election, a number of measures aimed at democratization and increasing the transparency of the country's electoral system and procedures. These measures included mandating the legislative codification of a parliamentary opposition, a mandatory 30% quota of women and young people on the electoral party lists and the easing of regulations and restrictions on the creation of political parties. The election threshold for political parties was reduced twice from 40,000 party members to 20,000.

==== Possibility of remote voting ====
At a briefing on 14 October 2020, Healthcare Minister Alexey Tsoi ruled out the possibility of the upcoming parliamentary elections being held online due to the COVID-19 pandemic in the country, saying that "the Ministry of Health is responsible for safety. At the elections, we will envisage all measures taken in order to maintain the epidemiological situation and ensure the safety of the elections." Shortly after Tsoi's statements, a petition was launched in the country against remote voting, criticizing it as not guaranteeing the secrecy of the vote, creating opportunities for various manipulations and violations.

Noting that existing law did not provide for remote voting, on 22 October 2020, Central Election Commission (OSK) Chairman Berik Imashev announced that the elections would not be held online, but instead would be held under strict sanitary guidelines.

== Parties ==
The Central Election Commission (OSK) announced that the nomination of candidates to the Mäjilis would begin 10 November 2020 and end on 30 November at 18:00 local time. The OSK required registered parties wishing to take part in the election to submit party lists and extracts from the protocol as well as consent from the individuals who were included in the list. By 10 December 2020 18:00, the OSK registered a total of 312 candidates from the contesting parties. The candidates for Mäjilis mandates from the Assembly of People of Kazakhstan were set to be nominated by the Council of the Assembly from 11 to 21 December with registration scheduled from 21 to 26 December.

=== Pre-election composition ===
As of November 2020, there were six registered parties in Kazakhstan, of which three were represented in the Mäjilis.

Party		Leader	Parliamentary leader	Seats in 6th Mäjilis
NO	Nur Otan	Nursultan Nazarbayev	Nurlan Nigmatulin	84 / 107
AJ	Aq Jol	Azat Peruashev	Azat Peruashev	7 / 107
QHP	People's Party of Kazakhstan	Aiqyn Qongyrov	Aiqyn Qongyrov	7 / 107

=== Contesting parties ===
Five political parties submitted their party-lists to the Central Election Commission (OSK). They included Nur Otan, People's Party of Kazakhstan (the former Communist People's Party of Kazakhstan), Aq Jol, Auyl People's Democratic Patriotic Party and Adal (former Birlik party). All unregistered opposition movements, and the one registered party, the Nationwide Social Democratic Party, announced that they would boycott the elections.

The parties that appeared on the ballot were as follows:

No.	Party		Ideology	Leader	No. 1 in party list	No. of candidates	2016 result
No.	Party		Ideology	Leader	No. 1 in party list	No. of candidates	Votes (%)
1.	QHP	People's Party of Kazakhstan	Socialism	Aiqyn Qongyrov	Aiqyn Qongyrov	113	7.1 / 100 (7%)
2.	NO	Nur Otan	Big tent	Nursultan Nazarbayev	Bauyrjan Isabaev	126	82.2 / 100 (82%)
3.	AJ	Aq Jol	Liberal conservatism	Azat Peruashev	Botagöz Abdulmanova	38	7.2 / 100 (7%)
4.	AUYL	Auyl People's Democratic Patriotic Party	Agrarianism	Äli Bektaev	Qairat Aituğanov	19	2.0 / 100 (2%)
5.	ADAL	Adal	Environmentalism	Serik Sultangali	Oljas Ordabaev	20	1.2 / 100 (1%)

== Campaign ==
According to the Central Election Commission (OSK) guidelines, campaigning kicked off at 18:00 local time on 10 December 2020. During the campaign period, all contesting political parties and candidates could organize and conduct rallies, processions, demonstrations and other pre-election events but were required to notify the OSK ten days before an event was held. The campaigning was to end on 9 January 2021 at 24:59 local time, to be followed by voting from 7:00 to 20:00 the following day.

=== Nur Otan ===
==== Primaries ====
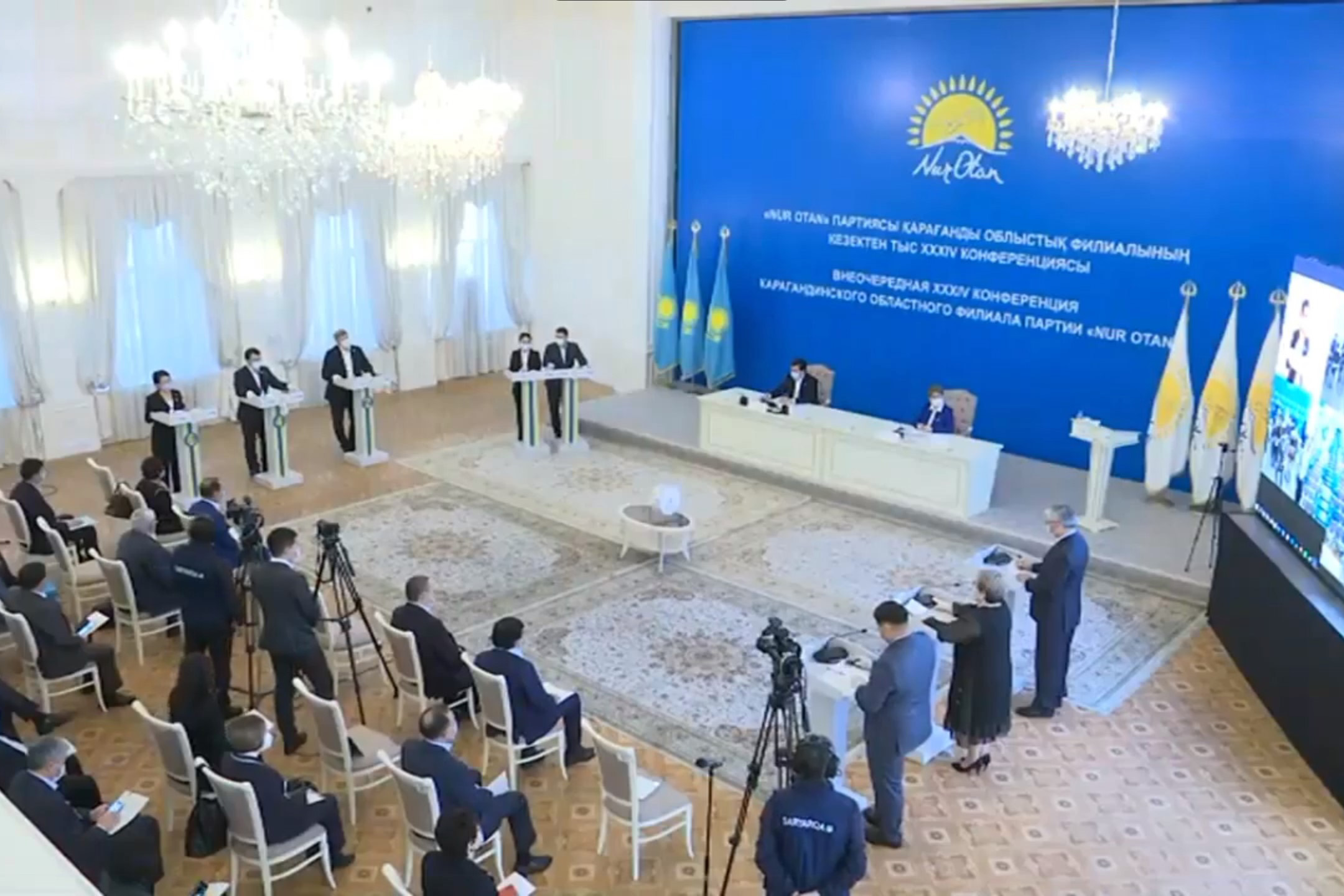
Nur Otan regional party conference in Karaganda, 17 November 2020

On 4 June 2020, Nur Otan Chairman Nursultan Nazarbayev announced primary elections, originally scheduled from 30 March to 16 May, would be held from 17 August to 3 October 2020 as an attempt for open political competition, promotion of civic engagement in the political process, and empowerment of women and youth. A closed primary took place from 1 to 3 October in-person and online. However, due to apparent technical problems with the voting website, the primary election was extended for a day. According to the party, nearly 10,000 candidates participated in the primaries, with 662,687 people participating in the vote, for a total 84% of party members voting.

On 18 November 2020, the Nur Otan revealed its primary results, which showed 78 out of 267 applicants being elected by secret electronic voting. Nine candidates were new party members who took part in the primaries, five were incumbent Mäjilis MPs, a third of the candidates were women, and 12 candidates were under the age of 35. The average age of the winning candidates was estimated to be 47. Twenty percent of candidates owned small or medium-sized businesses, 24.5% were economists, 11.5% lawyers and six candidates had higher education degrees.

==== 20th Extraordinary Congress ====
At the 20th Extraordinary Congress of Nur Otan held on 25 November 2020, party chairman Nursultan Nazarbayev said "we have proven that Nur Otan is a party of concrete deeds. During the pandemic, the Birgemiz Foundation provided assistance to more than two million people. For the party, the interests of ordinary people come first." The Nur Otan presented its party list of 126 people, 77 of them primary winners. One of the candidates on the list was Nazarbayev's daughter Dariga Nazarbayeva, making her first public appearance since being unexpectedly dismissed as the Senate Chair in May 2020. First Deputy Chairman of Nur Otan and former mayor (äkim) of Almaty Bauyrjan Baibek was appointed as the head of the party's campaign headquarters.

Program

Nur Otan's five-year program Path of Change: A Decent Life for All was presented at the extraordinary congress. The program focused on improving the quality of life for the country's citizens, social justice, and creating an accountable listening state with a key goal of fighting corruption.

=== Aq Jol ===
The "Aq Jol" Democratic Party announced its participation in the upcoming election and called for fair and open elections.

On 20 November 2020, the Aq Zhol held its 16th Extraordinary Congress in Nur-Sultan where party chairman Azat Peruashev spoke about how the COVID-19 pandemic in Kazakhstan brought bureaucracy and corruption, social injustice and a gap between rich and poor, as well as monopolization of power and the economy. He expressed a need for drastic change, and at the same time warned that further changes could lead to a crisis like those in Belarus, Kyrgyzstan and Ukraine. Peruashev also called for punishment for people committing electoral fraud at the polling sites, which he described as an "illegal seizure of power." The party in its manifesto announced its support for transitioning Kazakhstan from a presidential system to a parliamentary republic and proposed limiting the interest rate on loans and mortgages, consumer goods, SMEs and for people most at risk, as well as adopting a bankruptcy law which would guarantee borrowers preservation of shelter and social benefits. Aq Jol presented its party list of 38 candidates for the Mäjilis.

=== People's Party of Kazakhstan ===
The Communist People's Party of Kazakhstan (QKHP) made a statement on Facebook about its confident readiness for "achieving social justice that will maintain the stability of the economy and social sphere during the global crisis and ensure the well-being of the citizens of Kazakhstan."

The party held its 15th Extraordinary Congress on 11 November 2020 in Nur-Sultan where it was renamed the People's Party of Kazakhstan (QHP). Parliamentary leader Aiqyn Qongyrov was elected as the party's chairman. The renaming of the QHP was approved by every delegate except for former Honorary Secretary and senior member Vladislav Kosarev, although he did support the change in leadership. At the congress, the party also proposed giving to each family acres of land to building a house.

The QHP presented its list of 125 candidates for the Mäjilis on 23 November 2020 at the 16th Ordinary Congress where the party advocated public control over spending and allocation of resources, nationalization of the country's strategic industries, preservation of traditional values, implementation of a socially-oriented strategy, and a "fair state" for everyone. The party also outlined the goal of becoming a parliamentary majority in the Mäjilis. One of the candidates in the QHP party list included Rimma Ötesbaeva, a Nur Otan party member and the head of a Special Monitoring Group of the Mangystau Region who was bidding for seat in the regional mäslihat. Ötesbaeva wrote on her Facebook page that she was not a member of the QHP and had never even thought of joining the party. She asked the QHP Chairman Aiqyn Qongyrov to be excluded from the party's list and the alleged membership. According to Ötesbaeva, the incident was eventually resolved.

The QHP's party list ended up being registered with just 113 candidates due to lack of consent from the 11 candidates and one withdrawing its bid.

=== Auyl ===
Chairman of the "Auyl" People's Democratic Patriotic Party, Äli Bektaev, welcomed the date for the elections stating advantage for parties to campaign because of more preparation time.

At the 18th Auyl Extraordinary Congress which was held on 17 November 2020, the party announced its intention to enter the Parliament in order to raise political issues for rural areas. Bektaev at the congress said "in our election program, we propose to create a system of long-term crediting of agricultural producers with an annual payment of 2%. We believe that with such support it is possible to increase agricultural production." Auyl also called for monthly paid social benefits to all children under the age of 18. The party at the congress unveiled its list of deputy candidates for the Mäjilis which consisted of 19 people.

=== Nationwide Social Democratic Party ===
On 18 September 2020, deputy chairman of the Nationwide Social Democratic Party (JSDP) Aidar Alibaev said that the party would not boycott the elections. He emphasized the need for the party to win at least 30% of the vote. In October 2020, JSDP chairman Ashat Rahymjanov called on the party to participate in the election. From there, he proposed the possibility of changing the electoral system from proportional representation to mixed-member or majoritarian representation.

However, on 27 November 2020, at the party's extraordinary congress, the JSDP announced its decision to boycott the upcoming elections due to situation in the country not changing despite the adoption of amendments to the electoral legislation in attempt to "show attitude to the current situation" according to party chairman Ashat Rahymjanov.

=== ADAL ===
Shortly after the election date was set, the Birlik supported the move stating that "it's important to hold elections within the time frame approved by law." On 5 November 2020, at the meeting of the political council, the party announced a name change to ADAL, which according to the party's chairman Serik Sultangali, was decided by sociologists after polling took place on potential new names. It was re-registered on 11 November.

On 19 November 2020, the ADAL revealed its manifesto and its approved list of 20 competing Mäjilis deputy candidates, who were public figures, journalists, ecologists, representatives of the agricultural sector, and authors of social projects. The party announced its five electoral program goals, which were a decent life for all citizens, entrepreneurship support, development of agriculture, improvement of regions, and a "state for the people". Adal presented its plans to abandon mandatory pension contributions, free education, free healthcare with increased pay for doctors, elimination of business restrictions as well as institution of bankruptcy. The party also raised questions about environmental problems by mentioning illegal landfills with solutions such as developing of environmental education, the conversion of heat supply and transformation of public transport to a cleaner gas alternative.

=== Unregistered parties and movements ===
==== Protests and calls for boycott ====
Several unregistered parties called for protests and boycotts over the election. A sanctioned rally was held in Walikhanov Square in Almaty on 31 October 2020 by human rights activists, which was supported by Democratic Choice of Kazakhstan (QDT) and Köşe Party, demanding political reforms and an end to political persecutions. The unregistered Democratic Party of Kazakhstan (QDP) held legal single-person picket protests throughout the country demanding the government to register other parties to take part in the election. The party held an authorized demonstration in Almaty on 14 November 2020 which called for boycott in the election, freedom for political prisoners, and a moratorium on land sales for foreigners.

On 16 December 2020, at the Independence Day, unsanctioned protests took place in Almaty by activists of Oyan, Qazaqstan and the Democratic Party of Kazakhstan. The demonstrators gathered in the Republic Square holding signs that read "Never forget 1986 and 2011", "Lives taken on December 16, votes to be taken on January 10", "Kazakhstan needs an upgrade!" and demanded the release of all political prisoners, fair elections, and the registration of all opposition parties. The Kazakh police responded to the situation by surrounding and dividing the protesters in groups to prevent them from marching to Astana Square. No arrests were made and the protesters were eventually dispersed after three hours, with law enforcement reportedly following them.

The opposition movement Halyq Biligi (People's Rule) demanded the Kazakh authorities postpone the upcoming parliamentary elections at a news conference on 22 December 2020, citing the legislation that de facto prevents any alternative political force participating in the race. The movement representatives urged all Kazakhstani citizens to boycott the polls if the demands were not met by the Kazakh government as a way to de-legitimatize the elections.

==== Smart voting ====
Prior before the announcement of the elections, talks arose among Kazakh activists on the possibility of using Alexei Navalny's inspired smart voting tactic to draw votes away from the ruling Nur Otan party. Advocates of "smart voting" recommended electors to vote for the opposition Nationwide Social Democratic Party (JSDP), noting that whether its stance of actually being an opposition to the government has no importance.

Democratic Choice of Kazakhstan (QDT) leader Mukhtar Ablyazov spoke in favor of "smart voting". On 17 November 2020, he called on his supporters to vote for the JSDP, which he accused of being government-controlled, as a way to show evidence of electoral violations that would occur during ballot counting, prevent Nur Otan from possibly obtaining more than 50% of the vote, spark mass protests in the country similarly to those in Belarus and Kyrgyzstan and expose the JSDP as being a "fraudulent" party. After the announcement, many videos were shared through social media showing Kazakh citizens being permitted and intimidated from joining JSDP by the party's representatives. JSDP chairman Ashat Rahymjanov called Ablyazov's move as "provocation". After the party announced its withdrawal from the elections, Ablyazov accused of the JSDP's decision being carried out under Nazarbayev's orders and instead urged people to vote for the Aq Jol. In response, the Aq Jol suspended its acceptance of new members until after the elections to prevent alleged rumors that the party had increased its ranks because of Ablyazov's intentions.

== Controversies ==
=== Pressure and political violence ===
From mid-October to November, at least 13 human rights non-government organizations (NGOs) involved in civil rights, election monitoring, environmental issues, and freedom of expression faced political pressure from Kazakh authorities, who accused the groups of tax evasion. The Kazakh government fined the NGOs 555,600₸ (roughly US$1,310) and to ordered them to suspend their activities.

Esengazy Quandyq, a Kazakh civil activist, history professor and known government critic, complained about political violence after his car was set on fire around 2 AM in Almaty. Quandyq suspected arson due to recent online articles where he criticized the Kazakh authorities over the election.

=== Crackdown on journalists and activists ===
Kazakh blogger and journalist Aigul Otepova was placed in a psychiatric clinic on 23 November 2020 after a local court ruled that she must stay there for a month for a "sanity check". Otepova was accused of supporting the banned Democratic Choice of Kazakhstan (QDT) movement. She denied the accusations, saying she was an independent journalist and blogger. Otepova was released from the facility on 11 December 2020, but remained under house arrest until 17 January 2021.

Alibek Moldin, a Kazakh activist, was detained by the Aktobe police and placed under house arrest on 10 November 2020. The Aktobe court gave Moldin a one-year parole sentence until 21 December 2021 after finding him guilty of being the leader of the Köşe Party, a movement associated with QDT.

On 22 December 2020, disabled Kazakh activist Asanali Suyubaev was taken to a psychiatric clinic by medical personnel and police in Aktobe after allegedly tearing down a campaign poster of the ruling Nur Otan party. This was confirmed by the clinic's deputy chief physician Esenaman Nysanov, saying that "he behaved in a strange way, namely, while outside, he was tearing election posters, which can be defined in a medical term as addictive behavior." Nysanov also said that Suyubaev had been under "psychiatric control" since 2012.

The Nur-Sultan court sentenced Ghadilbek Serikbaev to 15 days in jail on 6 January 2021, hours after he was detained by police at a medical clinic where he was required to get tested for COVID-19 as a requirement to be an election observer. Charges against Serikbaev were made after his Facebook post made on 2 January where he called for demonstrations in Nur-Sultan on election day. That same day, three Kazakh activists in Aktobe, Aitjan Temirghaziev, Berikjan Toqin, and Asylhan Jaubatyrov, were sentenced to 7 days in jail for violating "regulations for public events" after being detained while distributing leaflets on 4 January calling for local residents to hold a protest near the city's Central Stadium. Another Kazakh activist, Nurjan Muhammedov, was detained in Shymkent and charged with "taking part in the activities of a banned group."

Aq Jol filed a complaint with the Ministry of Internal Affairs after it received reports of party staffers being detained and prosecuted, and campaign materials being confiscated by the police. Aq Jol Chairman Azat Peruashev in a statement condemned the actions of Kazakh law enforcement and called for authorities to ensure legal protections for the detained staffers. It was speculated that the arrests of the Aq Jol staffers were related to illegal activities of Mukhtar Ablyazov, who called for his supporters to vote for the party in order to draw away votes from the ruling Nur Otan party.

=== Nur-Sultan cyber security training ===
On 5 December 2020, the Ministry of Digital Development, Innovation and Aerospace Industry warned Kazakhstani citizens about possible problems with access to foreign internet websites due to the "Cybersecurity Nur-Sultan-2020" training in preventing cyber attacks. To avoid problems for internet users, the Ministry urged people to install a government-issued certificate on their computers and phones which would allow the Kazakh government to intercept all the proxy servers made by a user. As the cyber exercise began on 6 December, many Nur-Sultan residents complained about not being able to access sites such as Google, YouTube, Facebook and Netflix. Kazakh internet service providers such as Beeline, Tele2 and Kcell instructed citizens to install a certificate by redirecting them through websites and SMS messages. The Kazakh government dismissed accusations that the training was conducted because of the upcoming elections, saying that the exercise was planned before the announcement of election day. Ruslan Abdihaliqov, head of the Information Security Committee of the Ministry of Digital Development, Innovation and Aerospace Industry, apologized to the public for the incident saying that problems with access to the state internet websites revealed problems in the organizational and technological base in the field of digitalization.

== Observers ==
On 22 October 2020, the Central Election Commission (OSK) announced the opening of Institute of International Observation with the Ministry of Foreign Affairs sending invitations to 11 international organizations, including the OSCE Parliamentary Assembly, Commonwealth of Independent States (CIS) Executive Committee, Collective Security Treaty Organization (CSTO) and others. The OSK intended to send invitations to 25 electoral bodies of foreign countries through its bilateral relations.

On 4 December 2020, the OSK issued a decree restricting election observers from live broadcasting polling stations, and the use of photos and videos. The move by the OSK was criticized as an attempt to bar independent observers from the polls, and a violation of constitutional law. Many domestic groups complained that their observer registrations were rejected due to allegedly not submitting required paperwork and demands for enormous numbers of documents, which were impossible to satisfy. As a result, the groups filed a lawsuit against the OSK in the Supreme Court of Kazakhstan, which declined to hold hearings.

Map of countries (dark blue) of which international observers were deployed in Kazakhstan (navy blue)

By 5 January 2021, the OSK had accredited a total of 398 observers, of whom 322 were from these 10 international organisations:

- CIS Executive Committee – 179
- CIS Interparliamentary Assembly – 48
- OSCE Office for Democratic Institutions and Human Rights – 42
- Shanghai Cooperation Organisation – 15
- Parliamentary Assembly of the OSCE – 9
- Parliamentary Assembly of Turkic-speaking countries – 9
- Cooperation Council of Turkic-speaking States – 7
- Parliamentary Assembly of the CSTO –7
- Organisation of Islamic Cooperation – 4
- EU Delegation to Kazakhstan – 2

76 foreign observers were deployed from Jordan, Kyrgyzstan, Maldives, Moldova, Turkey, Azerbaijan, Armenia, Indonesia, Uzbekistan, Russia, Romania, India, Philippines, Hungary, Spain, Norway, France, Switzerland, Poland, Czech Republic, Italy, Estonia, Ukraine, Germany, Belgium, Palestine, United Kingdom, Mongolia, Sweden, Canada, and Finland.

=== OSCE ===
On 8 December 2020, the OSCE Office for Democratic Institutions and Human Rights (ODIHR) opened a Limited Election Observation Mission (LEOM) led by Ambassador Jarosław Domański, which consisted of a team of 11 experts based in Nur-Sultan. From 15 December, long-term observers including 24 people were deployed.

The OSCE mission in its interim report released on 23 December 2020, wrote that "Nur Otan's campaign appears more visible, although all of the campaigns are presently low key. There are small numbers of billboards from all of the parties located around the country; posters and distribution of materials are scarce." The report also noted the need for "an increasing space for pluralism of news and opinions online, despite Internet shutdowns and blocking of websites."

In a statement written 10 January 2021, the OSCE said that the voting was organized efficiently especially the COVID-19 precautions, which however made clear observation impossible and that "important procedural safeguards were often skipped during counting and tabulation" which raised doubts on the accuracy of the announced results.

== Debates ==
Televised debates between party leaders and representatives took place on 30 December 2020 at the Khabar Agency. The participants were given 90 seconds to speak and respond to the questions that were asked. The speakers were allowed two questions for each other and two answers to respond to one another. The debate was held in three stages: in the first round, party leaders and representatives expressed their plans for economic development in Kazakhstan. The second round was based on social welfare in the country, while in the third round, the speakers made their address to the voters. The participants raised issues in land relations, economic development, food security, social issues, and problems of the agro-industrial complex.

2021 Kazakh legislative election debates
Date	Organiser	Moderator	P Present R Representative					
Date	Organiser	Moderator	NO	AJ	QHP	AUYL	ADAL	Ref.
30 December 2020; 19:00 AT	Khabar Agency	Erlan Igisinov	R Baibek	P Peruashev	P Qongyrov	P Bektaev	R Jumagaziev	

== Opinion polls ==
Nationwide polling showed ruling Nur Otan with a significant lead, around 75–77% of the vote, a slight decrease from October 2020. The Auyl People's Democratic Patriotic Party started in second place but its lead eventually fell and was taken over by Aq Jol. Some speculated that the Adal party was underestimated in the polls because of its huge campaign on social media, in contrast to other parties, making it a possible competitor to Aq Jol.

Several Kazakh bloggers and activists who conducted independent polling on social media throughout the course of the election were threatened with a fine by the Prosecutor General's Office of Kazakhstan due to not being officially registered to conduct surveys.

=== Polling ===
==== Second place spot ====
Date	Poll source	NO	AJ	QHP	AUYL	ADAL	JSDP	Lead
10 January 2021	2021 results	71.09%	10.95%	9.10%	5.29%	3.57%	–	60.14%
4 January 2021	IEI	69.5%	10.4%	8.1%	4.5%	3.1%	–	59.1%
4 January 2021	Astana Zertteu	73.7%	6.8%	6.4%	4.1%	3.4%	–	66.9%
31 December 2020	Nur.kz	73.8%	5.7%	5.1%	4.1%	2.2%	–	68.1%
25 December 2020	Astana Zertteu	74.2%	5.2%	4.4%	6%	2.5%	–	68.2%
9 December 2020	PORI	72.5%	5.5%	4.7%	3%	2.5%	–	77%
30 November 2020	IEI	72.3%	2%	3.3%	5%	1.4%	1.6%	77.3%
12 November 2020	PORI	72.1%	2.9%	2.7%	5.1%	1.9%	2.3%	77%
20 March 2016	2016 Results	82.20%	7.18%	7.14%	2.01%	0.29%	1.8%	75.02%

=== Exit polls ===
Poll source	NO	AJ	QHP	AUYL	ADAL
Qogamdyq Pikir	71.97%	10.18%	9.03%	5.75%	3.07%
Democratic Institute	72%	10.2%	9.54%	4.93%	3.25%
Astana Zertteu	73.75%	10.13%	8.17%	4.8%	3.15%

== Conduct ==
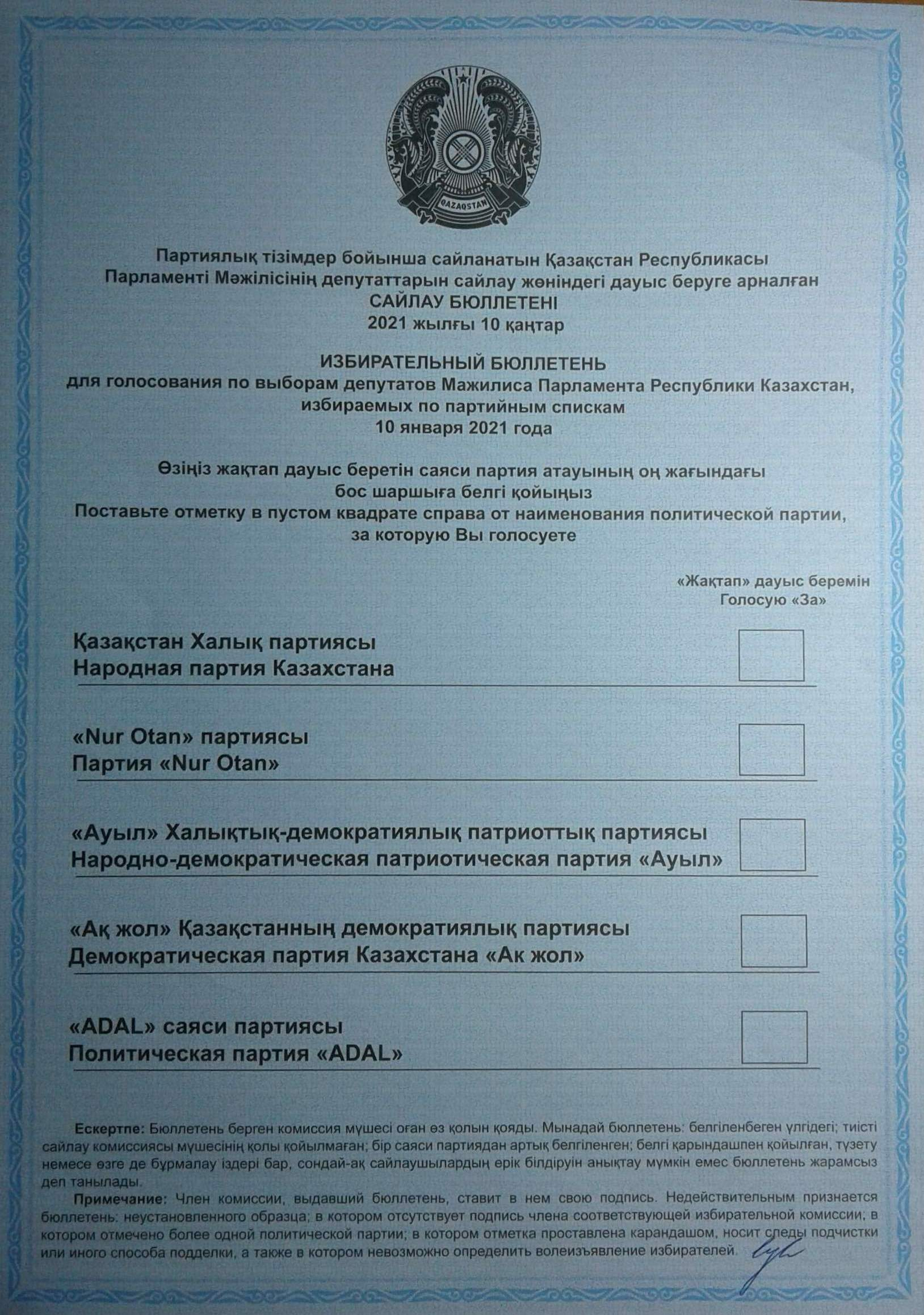
2021 legislative election ballot to

Polls opened at 7:00 local time. Voting took place first in the Nur-Sultan time zone, which consists of 12 regions in the eastern part of the country and 8,141 polling sites, and an hour later in Atyrau, West Kazakhstan, Aktobe and the Mangystau Region. Kazakhstani citizens were given three different coloured paper ballots to elect candidates by marking the columns of their party prefererence. The blue ballots were used for Mäjilis deputies, pink for regional mäslihat deputies, and pale green for city and district mäslihat deputies. By 20:00 local time, all 10,060 polling stations in the country were closed as voting concluded.

=== Violations ===
Independent observers reported difficulties and problems in monitoring precincts. Orynbai Ohasov claimed that he had been kicked out of the Polling Station No. 448 in the Oral Liberal Arts College while he was reporting irregularities allegedly violating quarantine measures. Roza Musaeva made a post on her Twitter page, stating that she was a "legal observer" and that she was detained by police. Other observers in West Kazakhstan Region stated that they had not immediately been able to enter voting halls for observation. Alleged hacking of several observers' social media accounts such as Facebook, Telegram, and Instagram was reported.

The Organization for Security and Co-operation in Europe (OSCE) complained about the failure of precinct workers to report votes as they were counted, and how poll observers were forced to remain at a distance which it said had "considerably limited transparency of the process" as the monitors had no clear view of the counting process. Although voting procedures were generally followed, the OSCE observers noted "strong indications of ballot box stuffing".

== Results ==
The ruling Nur Otan retained a supermajority, obtaining 76 seats in the Mäjilis, despite a loss of 8 seats and an 11.1% vote total decline in contrast to the prior election in 2016. Two minor parties, Aq Jol and People's Party of Kazakhstan, maintained their presence in the Mäjilis, gaining a higher percentage vote share and seats from Nur Otan despite usually polling less than the needed 7% electoral threshold to enter the Parliament. Kazakh official and former aide of Nazarbayev Ermukhamet Ertysbayev in an interview predicted that minor parties would win seats due to the interest of the Kazakh authorities in keeping the appearance of an opposition in the Parliament.

In response to the Nur Otan's performance, political scientist Marat Shibutov believed that initiative set by the opposition to boycott elections and spoil the ballots favored Nur Otan instead of votes that otherwise could've been gained by other parties partially. According to Gaziz Abishev, the elections gave Aq Jol enough to become the official main parliamentary opposition, which would be able to summon the Cabinet of Ministers twice a session for a government hour. The re-branded party Adal expressed doubts in the results, claiming that the party had overcome the 7% threshold based on calculations made by independent observers and polling which showed the party without around 12–29% support. Despite questionable outcome, Adal member Laura Malikova stated that "the official data are as follows. Therefore, we will continue our work without any revolution. At the system level."

Janar Jandosova, head of the Sanj Research Center, voiced her concern on the results published by the Central Election Commission (OSK), claiming that according to an independent poll conducted on 11 January 2021 which interviewed 3,426 Kazakhstani citizens through phone calls, the Nur Otan had only received 56.4% of the vote in contrast with the official OSK's 71% result while the latter parties were 16% for Aq Jol, 12.5% for Auyl, 12.1% for Adal, and no more than 3% for the People's Party with a 44% turnout rate only compared to an official 63.3%. When asked voters on why had they not participated in the polls, the response according to Jandosova was that:

"They argued their refusal to vote by distrust of the elections, that is, in their opinion, whoever they voted for, Nur Otan will be the winner. Plus, they didn't see "their own" from the parties presented. In other words, the main argument for not voting is the lack of choice."

On 13 January 2021, the Voices of Kazakhstan, a platform that was launched to gather independent data from observers and voting protocols through Telegram chat bots published its report showing that Aq Jol had won majority of 45.02% of vote while Nur Otan managed to garner only 12.8% according to Baige bot. Another result by the Alaman bot showed Nur Otan winning slightly 39.81% majority of the vote followed by Aq Jol's 22.61% share, with other parties: Adal–14.81%, Auyl–10.57%, QHP–8.27% whom have managed to bypass the 7% electoral threshold to gain each mandate in the Mazhilis.

=== Mäjilis ===
Party	Votes	%	Seats	+/–
Nur Otan	5,148,074	71.09	76	–8
Aq Jol	792,828	10.95	12	+5
People's Party	659,019	9.10	10	+3
Auyl People's Democratic Patriotic Party	383,023	5.29	0	0
Adal	258,618	3.57	0	0
Members elected by the Assembly of People			9	0
Total	7,241,562	100.00	107	0
Valid votes	7,241,562	96.05		
Invalid/blank votes	297,718	3.95		
Total votes	7,539,280	100.00		
Registered voters/turnout	11,919,241	63.25		
Source: OSK Liter.kz

=== By region ===
The ruling Nur Otan party won most of the plurality of votes by party-list based on all 17 regions of Kazakhstan including three cities (Almaty, Nur-Sultan and Shymkent) of republican significance with its most percentage in Jambyl Region and the least in Almaty where the city saw the least turnout in the country.

Region	Nur Otan		Aq Jol		People's Party		Auyl		Adal		Invalid votes	
Region	Votes	%	Votes	%	Votes	%	Votes	%	Votes	%	Votes	%
Akmola Region	278,209	76.49%	33,474	9.20%	39,780	10.94%	7,529	2.07%	4,728	1.30%		
Aktobe Region	206,172	64.84%	40,071	12.60%	52,910	16.64%	5,781	1.82%	13,036	4.10%		
Almaty	178,461	55.54%	48,887	15.21%	43,337	13.49%	31,802	9.90%	18,835	5.21%		
Almaty Region	716,379	72.41%	114,939	11.62%	46,224	4.67%	60,251	6.09%	51,544	5.21%		
Atyrau Region	143,692	64.28%	25,875	11.58%	32,905	14.72%	11,277	5.04%	9,791	4.38%		
East Kazakhstan Region	462,685	71.04%	65,723	10.09%	75,298	11.56%	24,410	3.75%	23,186	3.56%		
Jambyl Region	399,766	79.54%	40,341	8.03%	32,746	6.52%	14,516	2.89%	15,229	3.03%		
Karaganda Region	476,504	76.13%	61,345	9.80%	66,411	10.61%	12,023	1.92%	9,606	1.53%		
Kostanay Region	308,037	78.47%	38,407	9.78%	23,237	5.92%	17,069	4.35%	5,805	1.48%		
Kyzylorda Region	261,720	74.46%	33,052	9.40%	13,496	3.84%	30,569	8.70%	12,653	3.60%		
Mangystau Region	128,789	58.72%	31,361	14.30%	25,594	11.67%	18,664	8.51%	14,908	6.80%		
North Kazakhstan Region	213,416	73.31%	29,533	10.14%	36,415	12.51%	7,937	2.73%	3,813	1.31%		
Nur-Sultan	173,732	59.23%	44,695	15.24%	38,752	13.21%	21,745	7.41%	14,394	4.91%		
Pavlodar Region	260,238	72.22%	43,513	12.08%	41,910	11.63%	9,483	2.63%	5,181	1.44%		
Shymkent	223,027	67.50%	27,349	8.28%	21,281	6.44%	42,755	12.94%	15,998	4.84%		
Turkistan Region	545,806	74.43%	74,889	10.21%	27,501	3.75%	48,181	6.57%	36,979	5.04%		
West Kazakhstan Region	171,441	62.57%	39,374	14.37%	41,222	15.04%	19,031	6.95%	2,932	1.07%		
Kazakhstan	5,148,074	71.09%	792,828	10.95%	659,019	9.10%	383,023	5.29%	258,618	3.57%		

==== Maps ====
Performance by Nur Otan by region. 0–55% 55–60% 60–65% 70–75% 75–80%

Performance by Aq Jol by region. 8–10% 10–12% 12–14% 14–16%

Performance by the People's Party by region. 0–5% 5–10% 10–15% 15–17%

Performance by the Auyl People's Democratic Patriotic Party by region. 0–4% 4–8% 8–12% 12–13%

Performance by Adal by region. 0–2% 2–4% 4–6% 6–7%

== Aftermath ==
=== Protests ===
Unsanctioned protests occurred in several Kazakh cities on election day, mostly notably in Almaty where demonstrators in the Astana Square were told to disperse by the representatives of the prosecutor's office. After a while, 30 people were detained by the special forces. At noon, Democratic Party of Kazakhstan and Oyan, Qazaqstan protesters gathered near Republic Square where they were surrounded in a cordon for seven hours by police. As a result of freezing temperatures, one protester became ill who an ambulance paramedic was not allowed to see for while and several others were diagnosed with frostbite. Internet blockage in areas of where demonstrations held were reported in the city. In Nur-Sultan, dozens of protesters were arrested and several activists were forcefully detained from their homes. Detentions of people also occurred in Aktobe, Oral, and Shymkent.

President Kassym-Jomart Tokayev, in response to the situation, stated that there would not be any repressive measures taken against demonstrators, telling that "protest sentiments exist in all countries of the world, as it turned out. As for the police, they will act in strict accordance with the law." Deputy Interior Minister Arystangani Zapparov said that all those detained were released without charges.

=== 2021 Assembly of People of Kazakhstan elections ===
The Assembly of People of Kazakhstan (QHA) held its 28th session at the Palace of Peace and Reconciliation in Nur-Sultan on 11 January 2021. From there 351 out of 504 QHA members voted for its nine nominees to the Mazhilis. Several Kazakh officials participated in the voting which included people such as President Kassym-Jomart Tokayev, former president and Elbasy Nursultan Nazarbayev, PM Askar Mamin, National Security Committee Chairman Karim Massimov, Senate Chair Mäulen Äşimbaev and others.

Among the nine nominees from the QHA to the Mazhilis were: Sauytbek Abdrahmanov, Avetik Amirkhanyan, Ilyas Bularov, Natalya Dementyeva, Yuri Li, Vakil Nabiev, Shamil Osin, Vladimir Tokhtasunov, and Abilfas Khamedov.

=== Opening session of the 7th Parliament ===
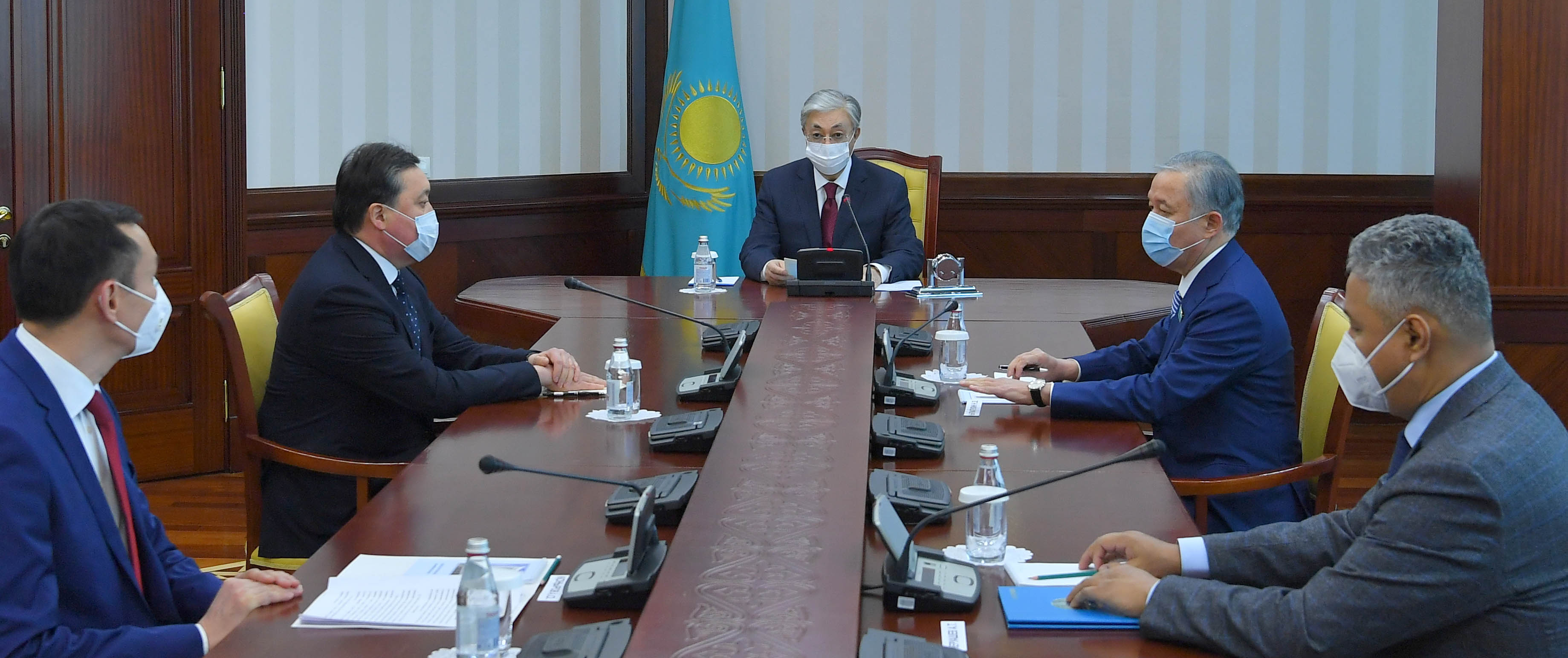
Tokayev meeting with government officials and Mäjilis deputies, 15 January 2021

The new session of the 7th Parliament of Kazakhstan convened on 15 January 2021 with 99 deputies of Mäjilis participating. Asqar Mamin was re-nominated to the post of the Prime Minister by Tokayev after stepping down as required by the Constitution on 10 January following the elections. Mamin's nomination was approved by 78 Mäjilis deputies except for People's Party of Kazakhstan (QHP) and Aq Jol deputies who withheld their votes for the PM. QHP Chairman Aiqyn Qongyrov criticized Mamin's government over its response to the COVID-19 pandemic in the country that lead to a number of economic problems while MP Irina Smirnova, earlier on 13 January, proposed her own prime-ministerial candidacy at the QHP party congress. In response to the lack of unanimous support for Mamin, Tokayev stated that "abstinence is a position that does not contradict the one expressed by the head of state."

Nurlan Nigmatulin was reelected as the Mäjilis Chairman unanimously by the sitting deputies along with two new deputy chairmen that were chosen: Balaim Kesebaeva and Pavel Kazantsev.

=== International reactions ===
- Russia – State Duma Chairman Vyacheslav Volodin congratulated Mäjilis Chair Nurlan Nigmatulin, saying that "based on the assessment of the State Duma deputies who were observers in the elections, the voting was open and competitive."

== See also ==
- List of Mäjilis members of the 7th Parliament of Kazakhstan
