= Primary election =

Election that narrows the field of candidates before an election for office

Primary elections or primaries are elections held to determine which candidates will run in an upcoming general election. In a partisan primary, a political party selects a candidate. Depending on the state or party, there may be an "open primary", in which all voters are eligible to participate, or a "closed primary", in which only members of a political party can vote. Less common are nonpartisan primaries in which all candidates run regardless of party.

The origins of primary elections can be traced to the progressive movement in the United States, which aimed to take the power of candidate nomination from party leaders to the people. However, political parties control the method of nomination of candidates for office in the name of the party. Other methods of selecting candidates include caucuses, internal selection by a party body such as a convention or party congress, direct nomination by the party leader, and nomination meetings.

A similar procedure for selecting individual candidates under party-list proportional representation can be found in open list systems; in such systems, the vote for deciding which candidates on the list enter the legislature is combined with the general election (but the party itself may nonetheless hold a primary to decide which candidates are named on the list in the first place). Parties in countries using the parliamentary system may also hold leadership elections. A party's leader will typically become the head of government should that party win a majority of seats in the legislature (either in its own right or through a coalition with other parties), meaning leadership elections often select a party's de facto candidate for prime minister, much like a presidential primary. An electoral alliance, which is composed of multiple parties each with its own separate leader and organs, may also hold a common prime ministerial primary as in the 2021 Hungarian opposition primary, or a single party may wish to retain its leader but select someone else as its prime ministerial candidate, as the Portuguese Socialist Party has done in 2014.

Countries that use first-past-the-post for both the primary and general elections are often described as using a partisan two-round system to highlight the similarity to two-round (runoff) systems, particularly in two-party systems. These similarities have led to the first round of a two-round system sometimes being called a "nonpartisan primary" in the United States.

== Types of party primaries ==
Two types of party primaries can generally be distinguished:

- Closed primary. (synonyms: internal primaries, party primaries) In the case of closed primaries, internal primaries, or party primaries, only party members can vote.
- Open primary. All voters can take part in an open primary and may cast votes on a ballot of any party. The party may require them to express their support to the party's values and pay a small contribution to the costs of the primary.

In the United States, further types can be differentiated:

=== Closed primary ===
In a "closed primary", people may vote in a party's primary only if they are registered members of that party prior to election day. Independents cannot participate. Because some political parties name themselves independent, the terms "non-partisan" or "unaffiliated" often replace "independent" when referring to those who are not affiliated with a political party. As of 2026, thirteen states require elections to have closed primaries while in 4 states both parties voluntary use closed primaries, and in 6 states only the Republican party uses closed primaries.

=== Semi-closed or semi-open ===
In a "semi-closed primary", as in closed primaries, registered party members can vote only in their own party's primary. Semi-closed systems, however, allow unaffiliated voters to choose a party to participate in as well. Depending on the state, independents either make their choice of party primary privately, inside the voting booth, or publicly, by registering with any party on Election Day.

Sixteen states – Alaska, Arizona, California, Colorado, Illinois, Iowa, Kansas, Maine, New Hampshire, New Jersey, North Carolina, Ohio, Oregon, Rhode Island, Utah, and West Virginia – have semi-closed primaries that allow voters to register or change party preference on election day. Massachusetts allows unenrolled voters or members of minor parties to vote in the primary of either major party, but registration or party changes must be done no fewer than 20 days prior to the primary.

=== Open primary ===
In an "open primary", a registered voter may vote in any party primary regardless of his or her own party affiliation. Fourteen states—Alabama, Arkansas, Georgia, Hawaii, Michigan, Minnesota, Missouri, Montana, North Dakota, South Carolina, Texas, Vermont, Virginia, and Wisconsin—have open primaries.

This system is sometimes criticized for increasing the ease with which voters can engage in party raiding. Raiding consists of voters of one party crossing over and voting in the primary of another party, effectively allowing a party to choose a weak opponent in the election. An example of this can be seen in the 1998 Vermont senatorial primary with the nomination of Fred Tuttle as the Republican candidate in the general election.

== Nonpartisan ==
=== Nonpartisan blanket primary ===
In a "nonpartisan blanket primary", all candidates appear on the same ballot and advance to the general election or second round regardless of party affiliation. In the "top-two primary" variant, the top two candidates advance to the general election or runoff.

- Louisiana has famously operated under this system, which has been nicknamed the "jungle primary", since the 1980s.
- California has used a top two primary outside of presidential elections since 2012 after passing Proposition 14 in 2010.
- Washington has used a top-two primary since 2008.

=== Unified primary ===
In a "unified primary" (also known as a "top-two approval primary"), all candidates appear on the same ballot (similar to the nonpartisan blanket primary). However, unlike the kinds of primaries mentioned above, in a "unified primary" uses a nonpartisan primary with approval voting, where voters may support any number of candidates instead of one. St. Louis, Missouri uses this system.

== In the United States ==
2024 Republican Party presidential primaries, rules Open primary Semi-closed primary Closed primary Canceled

2024 Democratic Party presidential primaries, rules Open primary Semi-closed primary Closed primary Canceled

The United States is one of a handful of countries to select candidates through popular vote in a primary election system; most other countries rely on party leaders or party members to select candidates, as was previously the case in the U.S.

The selection of candidates for federal, state, and local general elections takes place in primary elections organized by the public administration for the general voting public to participate in for the purpose of nominating the respective parties' official candidates; state voters start the electoral process for governors and legislators through the primary process, as well as for many local officials from city councilors to county commissioners. The candidate who moves from the primary to be successful in the general election takes public office.

In modern politics, primary elections have been described as a vehicle for transferring decision-making from political insiders to voters, though political science research indicates that the formal party organizations retain significant influence over nomination outcomes.

Studies have found little-to-no difference between top-two and traditional partisan primaries on most outcomes like political polarization, but lower levels of electoral participation and more voter confusion under nonpartisan primaries.

=== History ===
The direct primary became important in the United States at the state level starting in the 1890s and at the local level in the 1900s. The first primary elections came in the Democratic Party in the South in the 1890s starting in Louisiana in 1892. By 1897 the Democratic party held primaries to select candidates in 11 Southern and border states. Unlike the final election run by government officials, primaries were run by party officials rather than being considered official elections, allowing them to exclude African American voters. The US Supreme Court would later declare such white primaries unconstitutional in Smith v. Allwright in 1944.

The direct primary was promoted primarily by regular party leaders as a way to promote party loyalty. Progressive reformers like Robert M. La Follette of Wisconsin also campaigned for primaries, leading Wisconsin to approve them in a 1904 referendum.

Despite this, presidential nominations depended chiefly on party conventions until 1972. In 1968, Hubert Humphrey won the Democratic nomination without entering any of the 14 state primaries, causing substantial controversy at the national convention. To prevent a recurrence, Democrats set up the McGovern–Fraser Commission which required all states to hold primaries, and the Republican party soon followed suit.

=== Non-partisan ===
Primaries can be used in nonpartisan elections to reduce the set of candidates that go on to the general election (qualifying primary). (In the U.S., many city, county and school board elections are non-partisan, although often the political affiliations of candidates are commonly known.) In some states and localities, candidates receiving more than 50% of the vote in the primary are automatically elected, without having to run again in the general election. In other states, the primary can narrow the number of candidates advancing to the general election to the top two, while in other states and localities, twice as many candidates as can win in the general election may advance from the primary.

=== Blanket ===
When a qualifying primary is applied to a partisan election, it becomes what is generally known as a blanket or Louisiana primary: typically, if no candidate wins a majority in the primary, the two candidates receiving the highest pluralities, regardless of party affiliation, go on to a general election that is in effect a run-off. This often has the effect of eliminating minor parties from the general election, and frequently the general election becomes a single-party election. Unlike a plurality voting system, a run-off system meets the Condorcet loser criterion in that the candidate that ultimately wins would not have been beaten in a two-way race with every one of the other candidates.

Because many Washington residents were disappointed over the loss of their blanket primary, which the Washington State Grange helped institute in 1935, the Grange filed Initiative 872 in 2004 to establish a blanket primary for partisan races, thereby allowing voters to once again cross party lines in the primary election. The two candidates with the most votes then advance to the general election, regardless of their party affiliation. Supporters claimed it would bring back voter choice; opponents said it would exclude third parties and independents from general election ballots, could result in Democratic or Republican-only races in certain districts, and would in fact reduce voter choice. The initiative was put to a public vote in November 2004 and passed. On 15 July 2005, the initiative was found unconstitutional by the U.S. District Court for the Western District of Washington. The U.S. Supreme Court heard the Grange's appeal of the case in October 2007. In March 2009, the Supreme Court upheld the constitutionality of the Grange-sponsored Top 2 primary, citing a lack of compelling evidence to overturn the voter-approved initiative.

In elections using electoral systems where strategic nomination is a concern, primaries can be very important in preventing "clone" candidates that split their constituency's vote because of their similarities. Primaries allow political parties to select and unite behind one candidate. However, tactical voting is sometimes a concern in non-partisan primaries as members of the opposite party can vote for the weaker candidate in order to face an easier general election.

In California, under Proposition 14 (Top Two Candidates Open Primary Act), a voter-approved referendum, in all races except for that for U.S. president and county central committee offices, all candidates running in a primary election regardless of party will appear on a single primary election ballot and voters may vote for any candidate, with the top two vote-getters overall moving on to the general election regardless of party. The effect of this is that it will be possible for two Republicans or two Democrats to compete against each other in a general election if those candidates receive the most primary-election support.

=== Partisan ===
As a result of a federal court decision in Idaho, the 2011 Idaho Legislature passed House Bill 351 implementing a closed primary system.

In May 2024, the Republican Party of Texas approved at its bi-annual convention an amendment to its party rules that changes its primary from an open primary to a closed primary, in which only voters registered with the Republican party may now vote in the Republican primary election. State law in Texas currently mandates open primaries, where voters select which primary to vote in when they go to vote rather than affiliating with a party prior to the primary.

Oregon was the first American state in which a binding primary election was conducted entirely via the internet. The election was held by the Independent Party of Oregon in July, 2010.

=== Presidential primaries ===
In the United States, Iowa and New Hampshire have drawn attention every four years because they hold the first caucus and primary election, respectively, and often give a candidate the momentum to win their party's nomination. Since 2000, the primary in South Carolina has also become increasingly important, as it is the first Southern state to hold a primary election in the calendar year.

A criticism of the current presidential primary election schedule is that it gives undue weight to the few states with early primaries, as those states often build momentum for leading candidates and rule out trailing candidates long before the rest of the country has even had a chance to weigh in, leaving the last states with virtually no actual input on the process. The counterargument to this criticism, however, is that, by subjecting candidates to the scrutiny of a few early states, the parties can weed out candidates who are unfit for office.

The Democratic National Committee (DNC) proposed a new schedule and a new rule set for the 2008 presidential primary elections. Among the changes: the primary election cycle would start nearly a year earlier than in previous cycles, states from the West and the South would be included in the earlier part of the schedule, and candidates who run in primary elections not held in accordance with the DNC's proposed schedule (as the DNC does not have any direct control over each state's official election schedules) would be penalized by being stripped of delegates won in offending states. The New York Times called the move, "the biggest shift in the way Democrats have nominated their presidential candidates in 30 years."

Of note regarding the DNC's proposed 2008 presidential primary election schedule is that it contrasted with the Republican National Committee's (RNC) rules regarding presidential primary elections. "No presidential primary, caucus, convention, or other meeting may be held for the purpose of voting for a presidential candidate and/or selecting delegates or alternate delegates to the national convention, prior to the first Tuesday of February in the year in which the national convention is held." In 2028, this date is February 1.

Candidates for U.S. President who seek their party's nomination participate in primary elections run by state governments, or caucuses run by the political parties. Unlike an election where the only participation is casting a ballot, a caucus is a gathering or "meeting of party members designed to select candidates and propose policies". Both primaries and caucuses are used in the presidential nomination process, beginning in January or February and culminating in the late summer political party conventions. Candidates may earn convention delegates from each state primary or caucus. Sitting presidents generally do not face serious competition from their party.

=== Primary classifications ===
While it is clear that the closed/semi-closed/semi-open/open classification commonly used by scholars studying primary systems does not fully explain the highly nuanced differences seen from state to state, still, it is very useful and has real-world implications for the electorate, election officials, and the candidates themselves.

As far as the electorate is concerned, the extent of participation allowed to weak partisans and independents depends almost solely on which of the aforementioned categories best describes their state's primary system. Open and semi-open systems favor this type of voter, since they can choose which primary they vote in on a yearly basis under these models. In closed primary systems, true independents are, for all practical purposes, shut out of the process.

This classification further affects the relationship between primary elections and election commissioners and officials. The more open the system, the greater the chance of raiding, or voters voting in the other party's primary in hopes of getting a weaker opponent chosen to run against a strong candidate in the general election. Raiding has proven stressful to the relationships between political parties, who feel cheated by the system, and election officials, who try to make the system run as smoothly as possible.

Perhaps the most dramatic effect this classification system has on the primary process is its influence on the candidates themselves. Whether a system is open or closed dictates the way candidates run their campaigns. In a closed system, from the time a candidate qualifies to the day of the primary, they tend to have to cater to partisans, who tend to lean to the more extreme ends of the ideological spectrum. In the general election, under the assumptions of the median voter theorem, the candidate must move more towards the center in hopes of capturing a plurality.

== In Europe ==
In Europe, primaries are not organized by the public administration but by parties themselves, and legislation is mostly silent on primaries. However, parties may need government cooperation, particularly for open primaries.

Whereas closed primaries are rather common within many European countries, a few political parties in Europe have opted for open primaries. Parties generally organize primaries to nominate the party leader (leadership election). The underlying reason for that is that most European countries are parliamentary democracies. National governments are derived from the majority in the Parliament, which means that the head of the government is generally the leader of the winning party. France is one exception to this rule.

Closed primaries happen in many European countries, while open primaries have so far only occurred in the socialist and social-democratic parties in Greece and Italy, whereas France's Socialist Party organised the first open primary in France in October 2011.

One of the more recent developments is organizing primaries on the European level. European parties that organized primaries so far were the European Green Party (EGP) and the Party of European Socialists (PES)

=== European Union ===
With a view to the European elections, many European political parties consider organizing a presidential primary.

Indeed, the Lisbon treaty, which entered into force in December 2009, lays down that the outcome of elections to the European Parliament must be taken into account in selecting the President of the Commission; the Commission is in some respects the executive branch of the EU and so its president can be regarded as the EU prime minister. Parties are therefore encouraged to designate their candidates for President of the European Commission ahead of the next election in 2014, in order to allow voters to vote with a full knowledge of the facts. Various have suggested using primaries to elect these candidates.

- In April 2004, a former British conservative MEP, Tom Spencer, advocated for American-style primaries in the European People's Party: "A series of primary elections would be held at two-week intervals in February and March 2009. The primaries would start in the five smallest countries and continue every two weeks until the big five voted in late March. To avoid swamping by the parties from the big countries, one could divide the number of votes cast for each candidate in each country by that country's voting weight in the Council of Ministers. Candidates for the post of president would have to declare by 1 January 2009."
- In July 2013 European Green Party (EGP) announced that it would run a first ever European-wide open primary as the preparation for the European elections in 2014. It was to be open to all citizens of the EU over the age of 16 who "supported green values" They elected two transnational candidates who were to be the face of the common campaign of the European green parties united in the EGP, and who also were their candidates for European Commission president.
- Following the defeat of the Party of European Socialists during the European elections of June 2009, the PES Congress that took place in Prague in December 2009 made the decision that PES would designate its own candidate before the 2014 European elections. A Campaign for a PES primary was then launched by PES supporters in June 2010, and it managed to convince the PES Council meeting in Warsaw in December 2010 to set up Working Group "Candidate 2014" in charge of proposing a procedure and timetable for a "democratic" and "transparent" designation process "bringing on board all our parties and all levels within the parties".

The European think-tank Notre Europe also suggested European parties should designate candidates for High Representative of the Union for Foreign Affairs.

Finally, the European Parliament envisaged to introduce a requirement for internal democracy in the regulation on the statute of European political parties. European parties would therefore have to involve individual members in the major decisions such as designating the presidential candidate.

=== Armenia ===
On 24 and 25 November 2007, the Armenian Revolutionary Federation political party conducted a non-binding Armenia-wide primary election. The party asked the people of their recommendation of who they should nominate as their candidate for the upcoming presidential election.

=== France ===
The means by which the candidate of an established political party is selected has evolved. Until 2012, none of the six Presidents elected through direct election faced a competitive internal election.

- The right didn't hold often primary elections to decide for their national candidates.
  - In 2007, Nicolas Sarkozy, President of the UMP, organized an approval "primary" without any opponent. He won by 98% and made his candidacy speech thereafter.
  - In 2016, The Republicans held, on 20 and 27 November, primaries to decide of their presidential candidate for 2017.
- On the left, however, the Socialist Party of François Mitterrand has been plagued by internal divisions since the latter departed from politics. Rather than forming a new party, which is the habit on the right-wing, the party started to elect its nominee internally.
  - A first try in 1995: Lionel Jospin won the nomination three months before the election. He lost in the run-off to Jacques Chirac.
  - The idea made progress as the 2007 race approached, once the referendum on a European constitution was over. The latter showed strong ideological divisions within the left-wing spectrum, and the Socialist Party itself. This prevented the possibility of a primary spanning the whole left-wing, that would give its support to a presidential candidate. Given that no majority supported either a leader or a split, a registration campaign, enabling membership for only 20 euros, and a closed primary was organized, which Ségolène Royal won. She qualified to the national run-off that she lost to Nicolas Sarkozy.
  - In 2011, the Socialist Party decided to organise the first ever open primary in France to pick the Socialist party and the Radical Party of the Left nominee for the 2012 presidential election. Inspired by the 2008 U.S. primaries, it was seen as a way to reinvigorate the party. The idea was first proposed by Terra Nova, an independent left-leaning think tank, in a 2008 report. It was also criticized for going against the nature of the regime. The open primary was not state-organized : the party took charge of all the electoral procedures, planning to set up 10,000 voting polls. All citizens on the electoral rolls, members of the Socialist party and the Radical Party of the Left, and members of the parties' youth organisation (MJS and JRG), including minors of 15 to 18 years old, were entitled to vote in exchange for one euro to cover the costs. More than 3 million people participated in this first open primary, which was considered a success, and former party leader François Hollande was designated the Socialist and Radical candidate for the 2012 presidential election.
- Other parties organize membership primaries to choose their nominee, such as Europe Ecologie – Les Verts (EE-LV) (2006, 2011, 2016), and the French Communist Party in 2011.
- At the local level, membership primaries are the rule for Socialist Party's candidates, but these are usually not competitive. In order to tame potential feud in his party, and prepare the ground for a long campaign, Sarkozy pushed for a closed primary in 2006 to designate the UMP candidate for the 2008 election of the Mayor of Paris. Françoise de Panafieu was elected in a four-way race. However, she did not clinch the mayorship two years later.

=== Germany ===
In Germany, top candidates for the federal election can be selected in primaries. For party leaders, however, the selection at delegate conferences is required by law. It is, nevertheless, possible to hold a non-binding primary.

==== Top candidates ====
The Greens nominated their top candidates for the 2013 federal election (election of Jürgen Trittin and Katrin Göring-Eckardt) and for the 2017 federal election (election of Cem Özdemir and Katrin Göring-Eckardt) in a primary election by all party members (closed primary).

Primary elections are used much more frequently by parties at the regional than at the federal level.

==== Party leaders ====
The first party to use a (non-binding) closed primary to select its party leader at the federal level was the SPD in 1993. After the surprising resignation of Andrea Nahles, the SPD held another party primary to determine her successor in 2019. A dual leadership of Saskia Esken and Norbert Walter-Borjans was elected. The CDU used the procedure for the first time in 2021. Friedrich Merz prevailed against two competitors Norbert Röttgen and Helge Braun in an online ballot of all CDU party members.

=== Netherlands ===
Open primary elections are not common in the Netherlands, candidates and list leaders are either selected internally by political parties through party leadership or member meetings and Congresses. In democratically organized parties, elections are used to choose leaders and candidates, but participation is limited to registered party members.

==== Examples of Party leader elections ====
- 2006 People's Party for Freedom and Democracy (VVD) Leadership Election: This election was notable as it marked a leadership transition within one of the largest liberal parties in the Netherlands, and set up Mark Rutte for his 14-year tenure as Prime Minister of the Netherlands
- 2016 Labour Party (PvdA) Leadership Election: Held during a period of internal party challenges, this election sought to redefine the direction of the party amidst declining public support.
- 2020 Christian Democratic Appeal (CDA) Leadership Election.

=== Hungary ===
A two-round primary election was held in Budapest, Hungary in 2019 between four opposition parties, to select a single candidate to the 2019 Budapest mayoral election. A smaller primary was also held in the district of Ferencváros.

For the 2022 parliamentary elections, the opposition parties organized a primary to select both their candidates for MPs and prime minister.

In 2024, there were primaries held for some local governments, in particular, in the XII. district of Budapest for the position of mayor, which was held by instant-runoff voting, marking a first notable use of the system in political elections.

=== Italy ===
Primary elections were introduced in Italy to establish the centre-left candidates for the 2005 regional election. On that occasion the centre-left The Union coalition held open primaries in order to select candidates for President of Apulia and Calabria. A more politically significant primary was held on 16 October 2005, when The Union asked its voters to decide the candidate for Prime Minister in the 2006 general election: 4,300,000 voters showed up and Romano Prodi won hands down. Two years later, on 14 October 2007, voters of the Democratic Party were called to choose the party leader among a list of six, their representatives to the Constituent Assembly and the local leaders. The primary was a success, involving more than 3,500,000 people across Italy, and gave to the winner Walter Veltroni momentum in a difficult period for the government and the centre-left coalition. The centre-right (see House of Freedoms, The People of Freedom, centre-right coalition and Forza Italia) has never held a primary at the national level, but held some experiments at the very local level.

=== Kazakhstan ===
In Kazakhstan, political parties have occasionally used intra-party primaries as a mechanism for selecting candidates, although these processes are internal to the parties and are not part of the country's official electoral system.

The ruling party Nur Otan first implemented large-scale primaries in 2016, when the party organized more than 3,300 local closed primary contests to choose candidates for the mäslihat (local assembly) elections. More than 340,000 party members participated in these internal votes. The primaries were used to form Nur Otan's final candidate lists but were not open to the general electorate.

In 2020, the Nur Otan held nationwide primaries in a new format, combining online registration, debates, and both electronic and in-person voting amidst the COVID-19 pandemic. The primaries attracted thousands of applicants and were the first to be widely publicized as a party-wide selection process. Between 1 and 4 October 2020, 662,687 party members participated in the voting. From roughly 10,000 registered candidates, 78 were chosen via secret electronic voting from a short-list of 267. These results were used to form the party's final list of 126 candidates nominated for the 2021 legislative election.

=== Russia ===
The first primaries in the history of Russia were held in May 2000 in St. Petersburg, the local branches of the parties Yabloko and the Union of Right Forces, who before the Gubernatorial election offered citizens to choose a single candidate from the democratic opposition.

In 2007, before the parliamentary elections, United Russia held primaries in several regions. However, its results were not sufficiently taken into account when nominating candidates from the party. For example, the congress of United Russia included in the regional party list in the Samara region not the winners of the primaries, but those who did not even participate in the primaries.

In the same year 2007, A Just Russia held the primaries to determine the candidate for the Gubernatorial election in Altai Krai. Anyone could vote for them, for which special items were opened. However, in the future, A Just Russia did not begin to pursue the primaries.

In 2011, United Russia, together with the All-Russian People's Front, held primaries for the nomination of candidates for the Duma election. This vote was called the "All-People's Primaries", but in fact it was not. Candidates for the primaries were selected by special committees. Not even all party members had the right to vote, but only about 200,000 specially selected electors. In addition, the results of voting on the primaries were in most cases ignored. Of the 80 lists of regional groups of candidates for the State Duma, nominated by the congress of Unitpared Russia, only 8 lists coincided with the lists of winners of the primaries. All the same, the event played a role in the elimination of candidates: there were cases when the current deputies of the State Duma, having seen that they did not enjoy the support of electors, withdrew their candidacies.

In the future, United Russia has sometimes resorted to an "open" model of primaries, which allows voting to all interested voters. In 2014, in the primaries of the "United Russia" before the elections to the Moscow City Duma, any Muscovite could vote, and not only registered electors.

In 2016, the primaries for the selection of candidates for parliamentary elections were held by four parties: United Russia, People's Freedom Party, the Party of Growth and the Green Alliance. The most massive were 22 May 2016 primaries of the United Russia, which could vote for every citizen who has an active electoral right. However, the primaries, as well as earlier, were not binding for the leadership of United Russia: a number of winners of the primaries were withdrawn by the leadership without any explanation of reasons, and in 18 single-seat constituencies the party did not nominate any candidates. A striking example was the Nizhny Tagil constituency, where the candidate from the United Russia was approved candidate, who took the 4th place in the primaries. Finally, a number of candidates were included in the party list on the proposal of the party leader Dmitry Medvedev from among those who did not even participate in the primaries.

In 2017, the Party of Growth holds the primaries for the nomination of candidates for the presidential election. These are the first presidential primaries in the history of Russia. However, voting for candidates will take place via the Internet within three months, and, according to the spokesman of the party, the results of the primaries will not be mandatory for the nomination of the candidate and the party convention may nominate another candidate who does not even participate in the primaries, or even not nominate candidates and support President Vladimir Putin, if he decides to be re-elected.

=== Poland ===
- 2019 Civic Platform presidential primary
- 2020 Confederation Liberty and Independence presidential primaries

=== Portugal ===
- 2014 Portuguese Socialist Party prime ministerial primary

=== United Kingdom ===
For the 2010 general election, the Conservative Party used open primaries to select two candidates for Member of Parliament. Further open primaries were used to select some Conservative candidates for the 2015 general election, and there are hopes other parties may nominate future candidates in this way.

== In Canada ==
As in Europe, nomination meetings and leadership elections (somewhat similar to primary elections) in Canada are not organized by the public administration but by parties themselves. Political parties participate in federal elections to the House of Commons, in legislative elections in all ten provinces, and in Yukon. (The legislatures and elections in the Northwest Territories and Nunavut are non-partisan.)

=== Local candidates ===
Typically, in the months before an anticipated general election, local riding associations of political parties in each electoral district will schedule and announce a nomination contest or nomination meeting (similar to a nominating caucus in the United States). Would-be candidates will then file nomination papers with the association, and usually will devote time to solicit existing party members, and to sign up new party members who will also support them at the nomination meeting. At the meeting, typically each candidate will speak, and then members in attendance will vote. The electoral system most often used is an exhaustive ballot system; if no candidate has over 50% of the votes, the candidate with the lowest number of votes will be dropped and another ballot will be held. Also, other candidates who recognize that they will probably not win may withdraw between ballots, and may "throw their support" to (encourage their own supporters to vote for) another candidate. After the nomination meeting, the candidate and the association will obtain approval from party headquarters, and file the candidate's official nomination papers and necessary fees and deposits with Elections Canada or the provincial/territorial election commissions as appropriate.

At times, party headquarters may overturn an association's chosen candidate; for example, if any scandalous information about the candidate comes to light after the nomination. A party headquarters may also "parachute" a prominent candidate into an easy-to-win riding, removing the need to have a nomination meeting. These situations tend to cause disillusionment among a party's supporters.

=== Party leaders ===
Canadian political parties also organize their own elections of party leaders. Not only will the party leader run for a seat in their own chosen riding, they will also become Prime Minister (in a federal election) or Premier (in a province or territory) should their party secure the confidence of parliament (usually by winning the most seats). Thus, a leadership election is also considered to be one for the party's de facto candidate for Prime Minister or Premier. If the party does not secure the confidence of parliament, but wins the next most seats, the party leader will become Leader of the Official Opposition; if the party comes third or lower but maintains official party status, the leader will still be recognized as the leader of their party, and will be responsible for co-ordinating the activities and affairs of their party's caucus in the legislature.

In the past, Canadian political parties chose party leaders through an American-style delegated leadership convention. Local riding associations would choose delegates, usually in a manner similar to how they would choose a candidate for election. These delegates typically said explicitly which leadership candidate they would support. Those delegates, as well as other delegates (e.g. sitting party members of Parliament or the legislature, or delegates from party-affiliated organizations such as labor unions in the case of the New Democratic Party), would then vote, again using the exhaustive ballot method, until a leader was chosen. Some provincial political parties retain the delegated convention format.

Lately, Canada's major political parties have moved towards direct elections for federal leadership. A leadership convention is still scheduled, but all party members have a chance to vote for the new leader. Typically, members may vote either in person at the convention, online, or through a mail-in ballot.

Instant-runoff is used in whole or in part to elect the leaders of the three largest federal political parties in Canada: the Liberal Party of Canada, the Conservative Party of Canada, and the New Democratic Party, albeit the New Democratic Party uses a mixture of IRV and exhaustive voting, allowing each member to choose one format or the other for their vote (as was used in their 2017 leadership election). In 2013, members of the Liberal Party of Canada elected Justin Trudeau as party leader through IRV in a national leadership election. The Conservative Party used IRV (where each of the party's 338 riding associations are weighted equally, regardless of how many members voted in each riding) to elect Erin O'Toole as party leader in 2020, Andrew Scheer in 2017, and Stephen Harper in 2004.

== Elsewhere ==
=== Americas ===
- Argentina
  - In Argentina, the presidential primary election is structured as a blanket primary system. Within this framework, voters have the freedom to select a single candidate for each available position, irrespective of party affiliations. This approach holds historical significance, as it was previously employed in the United States as well.
- Chile
  - 2017 Chilean presidential primaries
- Colombia:
  - In the 2006 presidential elections, the Liberal Party, and the socialist Alternative Democratic Pole held primary elections, electing Horacio Serpa as the Liberal candidate, and Carlos Gaviria as candidate of the Alternative Democratic Pole.
  - In the 2010 presidential elections, four parties held primary elections: The Liberal Party elected former minister Rafael Pardo as candidate, the Democratic Pole elected senator Gustavo Petro, the Conservative Party chose ambassador Noemi Sanin, and the Green Party chose former mayor of Bogota Antanas Mockus.
- Costa Rica: the country's three main political parties, the National Liberation Party, the Social Christian Unity Party, and the Citizens' Action Party, have all run primary elections on several different occasions.
- Uruguay
  - In Uruguay, a blanket primary election is held every five years to elect the national and department conventions of each party, which select their presidential and intendant candidates. All parties must participate, however voting is voluntary unlike the other instances in the electoral process.

=== Asia ===
- Hong Kong
  - 2020 Hong Kong pro-democracy primaries
- Israel
  - Israeli Labor Party primaries (1992, 1996, 1999, 2003, 2006, 2009, 2013, 2015, 2019, 2021, 2022)
  - Likud Knesset primaries:
    - 1996 Likud Knesset primary
    - 2009 Likud Knesset primary
    - 2022 Likud Knesset primary
  - 2022 Meretz primary
  - 2026 The Democrats primaries
- Republic of China (Taiwan):
  - 2019 Democratic Progressive Party presidential primary
  - 2019 Kuomintang presidential primary
- South Korea
  - 2017 South Korean presidential election
  - United New Democratic Party presidential primaries
- India
  - 2022 Indian National Congress leadership election

=== Oceania ===
- Australia
  - The Australian Labor Party and the National Party have conducted limited experiments with primary-style preselections.
  - In 2018, the New South Wales branch of the Liberal Party rejected a motion by former Prime Minister Tony Abbott to have primary-style preselections.

== See also ==
- Leadership election, a similar process used to select the party's internal leadership instead of a candidate for external office
- Nomination contest, a similar process used in Canada
- Sore loser law, which states that a loser in a primary election cannot thereafter run as a candidate of another party or as an independent in the general election
