= 2012 Michigan Republican presidential primary =

- February 28, 2012

30 delegates to the 2012 Republican National Convention
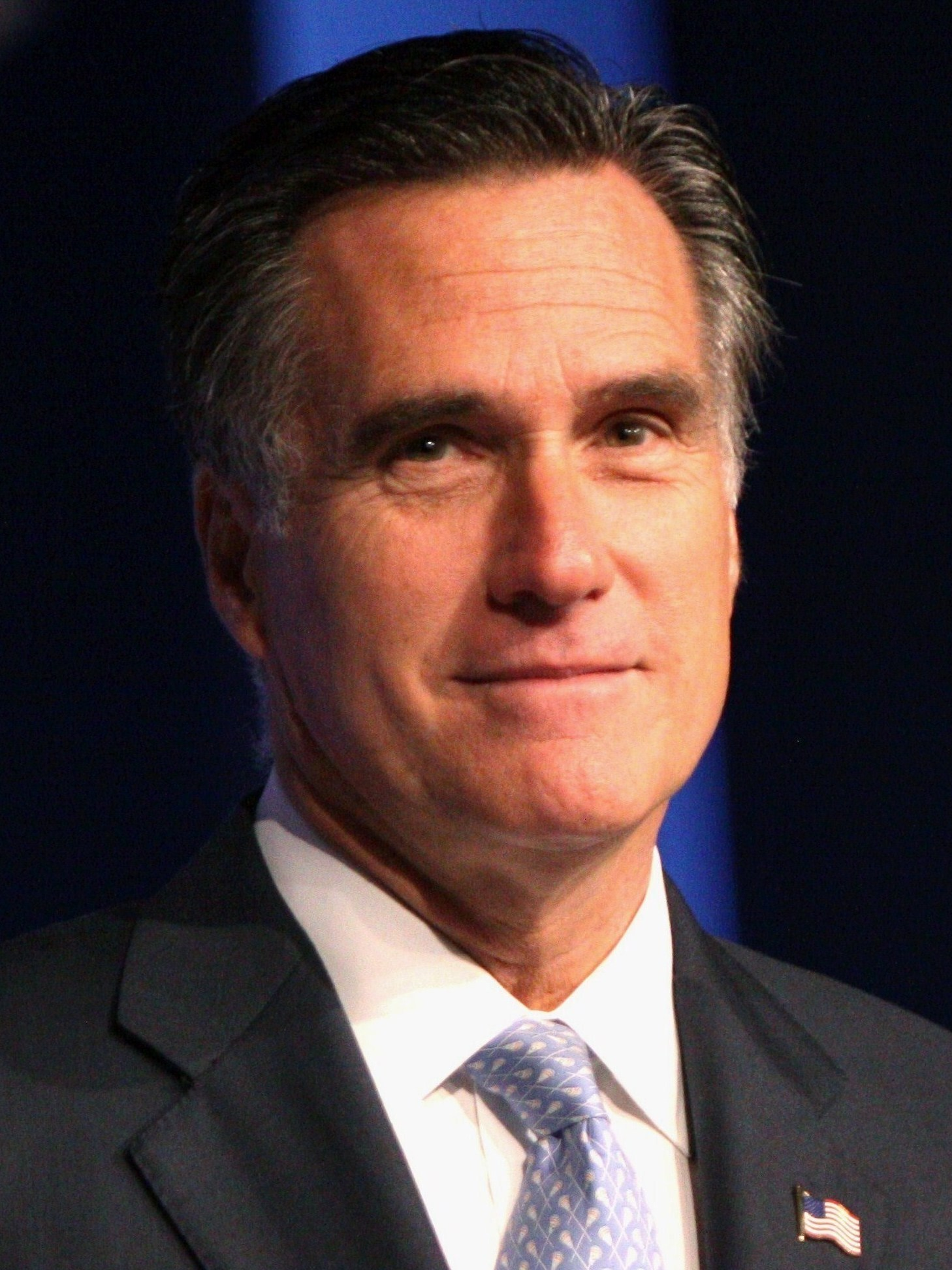

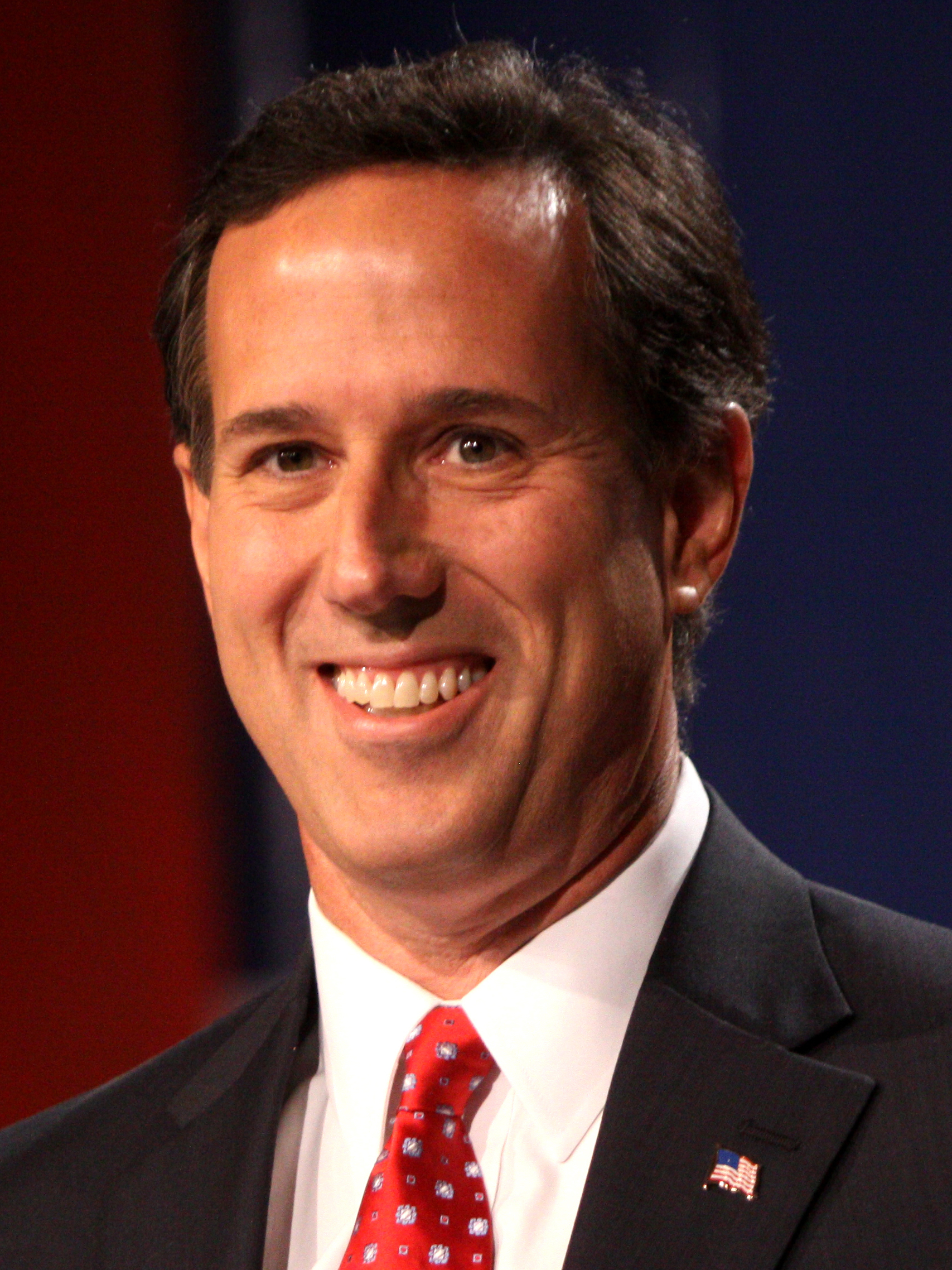

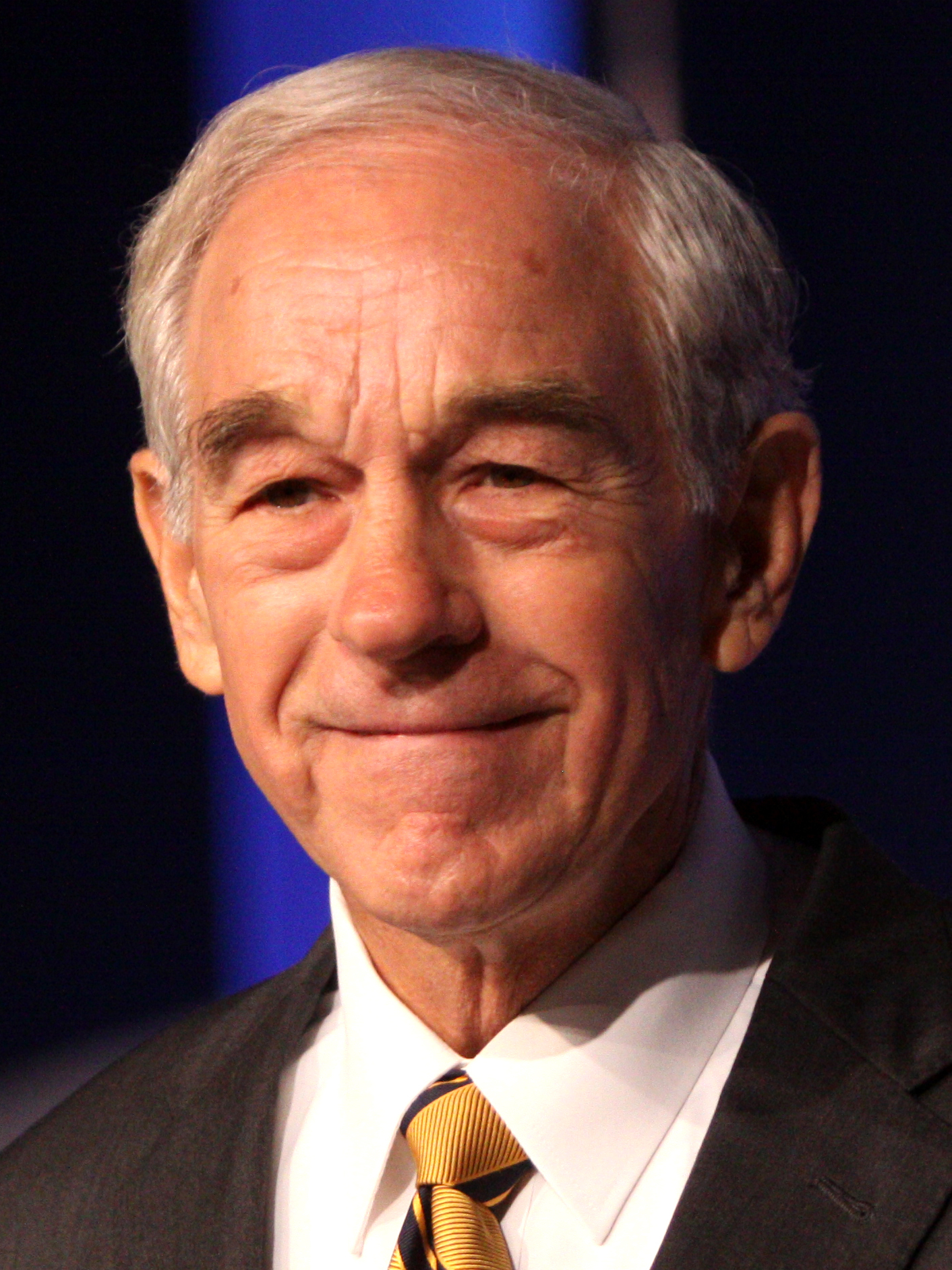

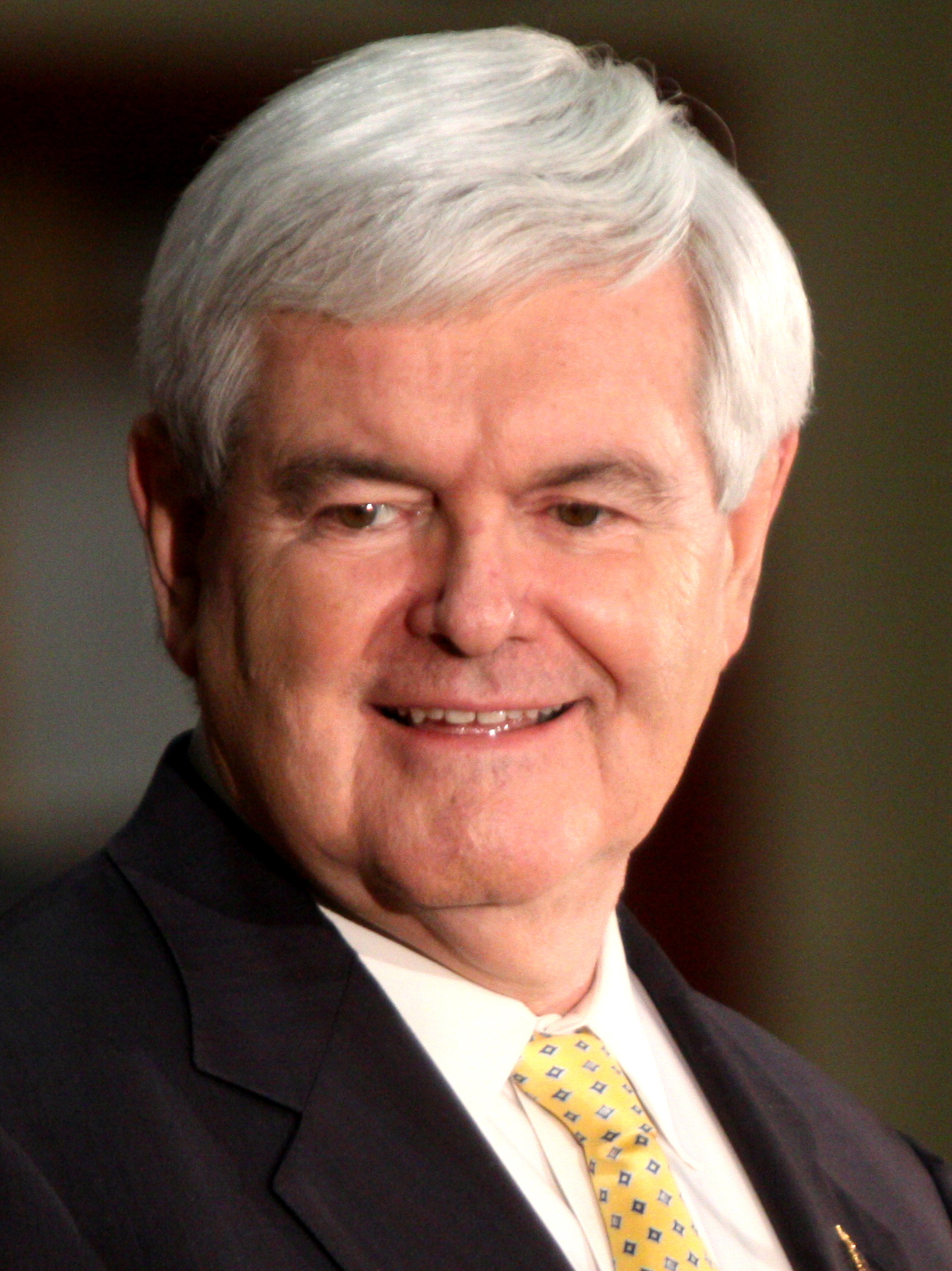
Candidate	Mitt Romney	Rick Santorum
Home state	Massachusetts	Pennsylvania
Delegate count	16	14
Popular vote	409,522	377,372
Percentage	41.10%	37.87%
Candidate	Ron Paul	Newt Gingrich
Home state	Texas	Georgia
Delegate count	0	0
Popular vote	115,911	65,027
Percentage	11.63%	6.53%
Santorum
30–40%
40–50%
50–60%
Romney
30–40%
40–50%
50–60%

The 2012 Michigan Republican presidential primary took place on February 28, 2012, the same day as the Arizona Republican primary. Former Massachusetts Governor Mitt Romney won both of these elections.

== Procedure ==
=== Voting ===
This Michigan election used a semi-open primary system (which the state referred to as "closed") in which each voter made a public declaration at their election site and received the ballot for the appropriate party, rather than the fully open system used in the past. The state had 7,286,556 registered voters as of February 15.

=== Delegate allocation ===
Michigan was given 59 delegates to the Republican (GOP) national convention, but that number was reduced to 30 as a penalty for bringing the election date forward before March 6 as the GOP rules set. The candidate with the greatest number of votes in each of the 14 congressional districts will receive that district's two delegates. Two additional delegates for Michigan were announced by the media to be given proportionally before the election but after the election the Michigan GOP announced there had been an error in the memo published and that the two delegates will be given to the winner, which sparked accusations of Mitt Romney rigging the results from Rick Santorum's team.

== Campaign ==
While Romney has close ties to Michigan, where he was born and grew up and his father was the Governor, Santorum, who once trailed Romney badly in the state, had a clear lead over him in mid February after Santorum won Colorado, Minnesota, and Missouri caucuses and primary on February 7. And the competition became a statistical tie between these two candidates before the primary.

Since Michigan allows primary voters to declare their affiliation at the time they vote, Santorum campaign paid for robo-calls inviting Democrats to cross over and vote for him. Romney called this tactic "outrageous" and "disgusting" but Santorum defended himself as not doing anything wrong but getting people to vote in an open primary.

Some Democrats also urged their supporters to vote for Santorum in the Republican primary, in hopes of forcing the Republican candidates to use more resources and help make it easier for Barack Obama to win the general election. This is similar to Rush Limbaugh's "Operation Chaos", where Limbaugh urged voters in the 2008 Democratic presidential primaries to vote for Hillary Clinton, whom he saw as being a weaker candidate than Obama. Michigan has a long history of such crossover voting; in 2000, strong Democratic crossover votes helped Senator John McCain win the Michigan Republican primary. In 1972, Republican crossover votes propelled Governor George Wallace to victory in the Democratic primary.

== Results ==
Polls closed at 8 PM local time on election day. While most of the state is in the Eastern time zone (UTC −5), four counties in the Upper Peninsula are on Central time (UTC −6), so the final closures came at 9 PM Eastern time. As of 2/28, results showed Romney winning 7 congressional districts and Santorum winning 7.

2012 Michigan Republican presidential primary
Candidate	Votes	Percentage	Projected delegate count		
Candidate	Votes	Percentage	AP	CNN	GP
Mitt Romney	409,522	41.10%	16	16	16
Rick Santorum	377,372	37.87%	14	14	14
Ron Paul	115,911	11.63%	0	0	0
Newt Gingrich	65,027	6.53%	0	0	0
Rick Perry (withdrawn)	1,816	0.18%	0	0	0
Buddy Roemer (withdrawn)	1,784	0.18%	0	0	0
Michele Bachmann (withdrawn)	1,735	0.17%	0	0	0
Jon Huntsman (withdrawn)	1,674	0.17%	0	0	0
Herman Cain (withdrawn)	1,211	0.12%	0	0	0
Fred Karger	1,180	0.12%	0	0	0
Gary Johnson (withdrawn)	458	0.05%	0	0	0
Uncommitted	18,809	1.89%	0	0	0
Unprojected delegates:			2	0	0
Total:	996,499	100.00%	30	30	30

At the Republican state convention in May, it was reported that of the 30 voting delegates for the national convention in Tampa, 6 were Paul supporters, and 24 were Romney supporters. Paul organizers disputed these numbers, stating that they had actually taken 8 (instead of 6) of the voting delegates, plus several non-voting slots.

=== Delegate allocation controversy ===
A controversy arose over the delegate allocation in Michigan, where 28 congressional district delegates and two at-large delegates were awarded. The Republican Party of Michigan rules stated that the two at-large delegates would be awarded proportionally, meaning that Santorum and Romney would get one delegate each for a 15–15 tie. But the following day the party's credentials committee allocated both at-large delegates to Romney, saying it had changed the rules a few weeks prior to award the delegates to the statewide winner but "in error" sent a memo to the candidates saying they would be awarded proportionately. Santorum's campaign protested, saying the committee's six members were mostly Romney supporters, and filed a protest with the Republican National Committee. Santorum's general counsel wrote in a letter to the RNC, "It is our understanding that several public supporters and Michigan surrogates of an opposing campaign voted in favor of the delegate allocation change which assisted their chosen candidate. This request is not about the allocation of a single delegate; it is about ensuring a transparent process, avoiding unscrupulous tactics and backroom deals by establishment figures and campaigns who have not received the result they hoped for at the ballot box." Committee member and former state attorney general Mike Cox endorsed Romney, but said the delegates should have been awarded 15-15: "I have this crazy idea that you follow the rules. I'd love to give the at-large delegates to Mitt Romney, but our rules provide for strict apportionment."
