= 28th Assembly of People of Kazakhstan Session =

The 28th Assembly of People of Kazakhstan Session was held on 11 January 2021 following the 2021 legislative elections in Nur-Sultan by the Assembly of People of Kazakhstan to elect nine members whose seats were reserved to the Mazhilis. 351 of 504 Assembly of People of Kazakhstan (QHA) members took part in voting to elect new Mazhilis members from the QHA of whom were: Sauytbek Abdrahmanov, Avetik Amirkhanyan, Ilyas Bularov, Natalya Dementyeva, Yuri Li, Vakil Nabiev, Shamil Osin, Vladimir Tokhtasunov, and Abilfas Khamedov.

The newly elected QHA members took office at the opening session of the 7th Parliament of Kazakhstan on 15 January 2021.

== Background ==
=== Assembly of People of Kazakhstan ===
The Assembly of People of Kazakhstan (QHA) is consultative and advisory body under the President of Kazakhstan, the task of the body is to promote the development and implementation of state national policy. Formed in 1995, it was originally made to consolidate the interests of all ethnic groups living in Kazakhstan, ensuring the strict observance of rights and freedoms, regardless of their national origin.

In May 2007, a number of amendments were made to the Constitution of Kazakhstan to which the Assembly was given a constitutional status where it received the right to elect nine members to the Mazhilis, which significantly increased the social and political role of the QHA. In October 2008, following the adoption of the Law "On the Assembly of the People of Kazakhstan", the QHA became a full-fledged subject of the country's political system, and the normative legal framework for its activities was determined.

=== 2021 legislative elections ===
On 21 October 2020, President Kassym-Jomart Tokayev set the 10 January 2021 as the upcoming date for the elections of Mazhilis members whose terms were set to expire in spring 2021.

On 10 December 2020, Tokayev signed a decree for the 28th Assembly of People of Kazakhstan Session to be held on 11 January 2021 at the Palace of Peace and Reconciliation in Nur-Sultan. The following day, nomination of candidates by the QHA began on 11 December and was set to end on 21 December 2020.

==== Candidates ====
On 14 December, the QHA presented its list of candidates to the Central Election Commission (OSK) which included former Mazhilis MP Sauytbek Abdrahmanov. The OSK registered all the nine nominated QHA candidates on 24 December 2020.

- Sauytbek Abdrahmanov, member of the 5th Mazhilis
- Avetik Amirkhanyan, chairman of the Masis West Kazakhstan Regional Armenian Ethnocultural Public Association
- Ilyas Bularov, äkim of the Sartobinsky Rural District
- Natalya Dementyeva, director of the Technical Lyceum municipal state institution of the Education Department of the city of Kokshetau
- Yuri Li, chairman of the National Chamber of Collectors of Kazakhstan Association of Legal Entities
- Vakil Nabiev, vice-president of the Kurds Barbang Association
- Shamil Osin, head of the Şyğys farm
- Vladimir Tokhtasunov, general director of ZhetysuOblGaz Limited Liability Partnership
- Abilfas Khamedov, chairman of the Association of Azerbaijanis

== Results ==
Candidate	Votes	Percentage	Result
Sauytbek Abdrahmanov	298	59.13	✓ Elected
Natalya Dementyeva	292	57.94	✓ Elected
Abilfas Khamedov	290	57.54	✓ Elected
Vakil Nabiev	285	56.55	✓ Elected
Yuri Li	282	55.95	✓ Elected
Vladimir Tokhtasunov	277	54.96	✓ Elected
Ilyas Bularov	274	54.37	✓ Elected
Shamil Osin	271	53.77	✓ Elected
Avetik Amirkhanyan	270	53.57	✓ Elected
Source: OSK
