= Nur Otan primaries =

Nur Otan primaries were internal candidate-selection contests organized by the ruling party Nur Otan (renamed Amanat in 2022). The party held two major rounds of closed primaries, in 2016 and 2020, to determine nominees for elections to the Mäjilis and mäslihats. The 2020 party primaries were the first large-scale, publicly promoted party-wide selection process in Kazakhstan, combining online registration, debates, and electronic voting.

Although branded as primaries, the process was legally internal to the party rather than a state-administered election.

== Background ==
Candidate selection in Kazakhstan had traditionally been managed through party congresses and leadership nominations. The Nur Otan party first experimented with intra-party preliminary voting in 2016, when the party conducted closed primaries to select mäslihat candidates.

The idea of broader primaries re-emerged as part of Nur Otan's "reboot" program announced in August 2019, when party leadership signalled a drive to renew cadres and increase intra-party competition. Drawing explicitly on comparative experience (including Russia's preliminary voting and other international models), the party adopted rules for a larger, modernized primary format that was implemented starting 2020.

== 2016 ==
Nur Otan held its first-ever closed primaries to select candidates for local mäslihat (municipal assembly) elections. The primaries were conducted between 26 January 2016 and 4 February 2016 and involved more than 3,335 preliminary contests across the country, with participation of over 340,000 party members.

The process was limited to party members and organized at the level of primary party organizations, with candidates evaluated through internal screenings and votes within party branches. In the city of Almaty, for example, 4,761 party members voted, resulting in the selection of 37 candidates for Almaty City Mäslihat.

== 2020 ==
The Nur Otan held its second and largest internal primaries in 2020 as part of a broader modernization campaign supported by President Kassym-Jomart Tokayev. The primaries were originally scheduled to run from 30 March to 16 May 2020, but were postponed due to the COVID-19 pandemic. On 4 June 2020, party chairman Nursultan Nazarbayev announced the rescheduled timeframe of 17 August to 3 October 2020.

The open primaries used a mixed system of online registration, public debates, and both electronic and in-person voting. The candidate registration period ran from 17 to 28 August 2020, followed by a brief campaign and preparation period, and public debates were held between 14 and 30 September. Voting took place from 1 to 4 October 2020, with the period extended by one day due to technical issues.

The primaries attracted nationwide attention, with 662,687 party members participating (around 84.2% turnout) and approximately 10,000 applicants registering as potential candidates. After internal screening, a short-list of 267 individuals was created, from which 78 candidates were ultimately selected via secret electronic voting. These results formed the basis for Nur Otan's party list for the 2021 legislative election, which the party approved on 25 November 2020, and were also used to select candidates for local mäslihat elections. The primaries aimed to promote younger, female, and regional activists.

Observers noted that while the 2020 primaries were a step toward greater party transparency, they were criticized as a remaining internal mechanism controlled by party leadership. Over 30 complaints were filed including allegations of fraudulent party memberships and misuse of online voting registration as well as multiple candidates being disqualified. Further, reports of alleged voter coercion to vote and possible online voting irregularities prompted official investigations.

== Future ==
Following the party's renaming to Amanat in March 2022, Majilis deputy Ekaterina Smyshlyaeva reflected on the 2020 party primaries as a valuable experiment in internal candidate selection which "attracted quite a lot of new faces to the party" and introduced activists to public political roles, while also revealing gaps in training and long-term personnel development. She indicated that Amanat's post-2020 candidate selection would focus on consultations and structured development rather than large-scale nationwide primaries.

Following President Kassym-Jomart Tokayev's proposed parliamentary reforms in 2025, Amanat deputy Erkin Abil proposed an election reform requiring Amanat as well as other contesting parties to hold primaries as way to ensure that contenders for the party list are presented to voters through public meetings and media engagement, increasing transparency in selecting individuals for Amanat's party lists.

== See also ==
- Amanat (political party)
- Elections in Kazakhstan
