= Vladislav Kosarev =

Kazakh politician

- Владислав Косарев
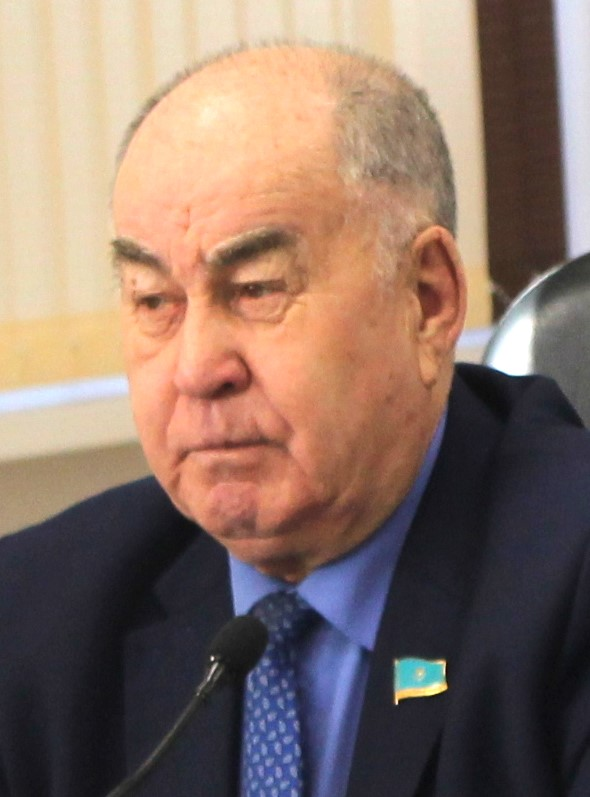
- Kosarev in 2018

Member of the Mäjilis
- In office 20 January 2012 – 30 December 2020
- In office 24 October 1999 – 19 September 2004
- Preceded by: Tatiana Silkina
- Succeeded by: Constituency abolished
- Constituency: Akmola 1st

Leader of the Communist People's Party in the Mäjilis
- In office 20 January 2012 – 17 September 2018
- Leader: Himself
- Preceded by: Office established
- Succeeded by: Aiqyn Qongyrov

Honorary Secretary of the Central Committee of Communist People's Party
- In office 1 June 2013 – 11 November 2020
- Preceded by: Office established
- Succeeded by: Aiqyn Qongyrov as (Chairman of the People's Party)

Honorary Secretary of the Central Committee of Communist People's Party
- In office 6 June 2004 – 1 June 2013
- Preceded by: Office established
- Succeeded by: Office abolished

Personal details
- Born: 16 November 1937 (age 88) Volodarskoye, North Kazakhstan Region, Kazakh SSR, Soviet Union
- Party: People's Party (2004–present)
- Education: Omsk State Agrarian University; Higher Party School

Vladislav Borisovich Kosarev (Russian: Владислав Борисович Косарев; born 16 November 1937) is a Kazakh politician who served as a member of the Mäjilis, First Secretary and then Honorary Secretary of the Communist People's Party of Kazakhstan (QKHP) from 2004 to 2020 and the parliamentary leader of the QKHP from 2012 to 2018.

== Biography ==
=== Early life ===
Kosarev was born in the town of Volodarskoye in the North Kazakhstan Region of the Kazakh SSR. He worked as a tractor driver on the Borovsk State Farm in the Rusayevsk District and then served in the Soviet Army from 1956 to 1959. He graduated from the Omsk Agricultural Institute in 1968.

=== Political career ===
In 1958, Kosarev joined the Communist Party of the Soviet Union and in 1959, he began working as the secretary of the Borovsk state farm's Komsomol (Communist Youth League) and two years later became the secretary of the Party Committee at the Michurinskiy, Volodarskiy, and Chervonnyy state farms. In 1968, he became an instructor at the Oblast Committee. He became the first secretary of the Kokshetau Oblast Komsomol in 1970 and in 1973, the First Secretary of the Leninsky Regional Party Committee. In 1974, Kosarev became the First Secretary of the Lenin District Committee of the party from the Kokchetau Region. From 1980 to 1990, he was the chairman of the Regional Committee of the Agricultural Workers Union and then became a chairman of the Kokshetau Oblast Council of Labor Unions until 1997. From 1998 to 1999, Kosarev was the Director of the Representative Office of the Kazakh National Corporation of Health and Medical Insurance "Interteach" in Kokshetau.

In 1999, he became the member of the Mäjilis from the 1st District of Akmola Region until 2004.

In 2004, after splitting from the Communist Party of Kazakhstan, together with T. A. Kenzhin and A. A. Kholodkov, Kosarev founded the Communist People's Party of Kazakhstan (QKHP) and was the First Secretary of the Central Committee until he resigned from his post on 1 June 2013. That same day, he was unanimously chosen to be the Honorary Secretary of the QKHP.

In the 2012 legislative elections, he was elected as the member of the Mäjilis, representing QKHP and was the party's parliamentary leader from 20 January 2012 until 17 September 2018, when he was succeeded by Aiqyn Qongyrov.

In 2015, Kosarev openly defended the ban on the Communist Party of Kazakhstan, claiming it was due to ignorance of the party leaders about the law.

On 11 November 2020, he voted against the renaming of the party but supported Qongyrov's candidacy as the leader of the party.
