= Aiqyn Qongyrov =

Kazakh politician (born 1972)

MP Aiqyn Qoñyrov
- Айқын Қоңыров
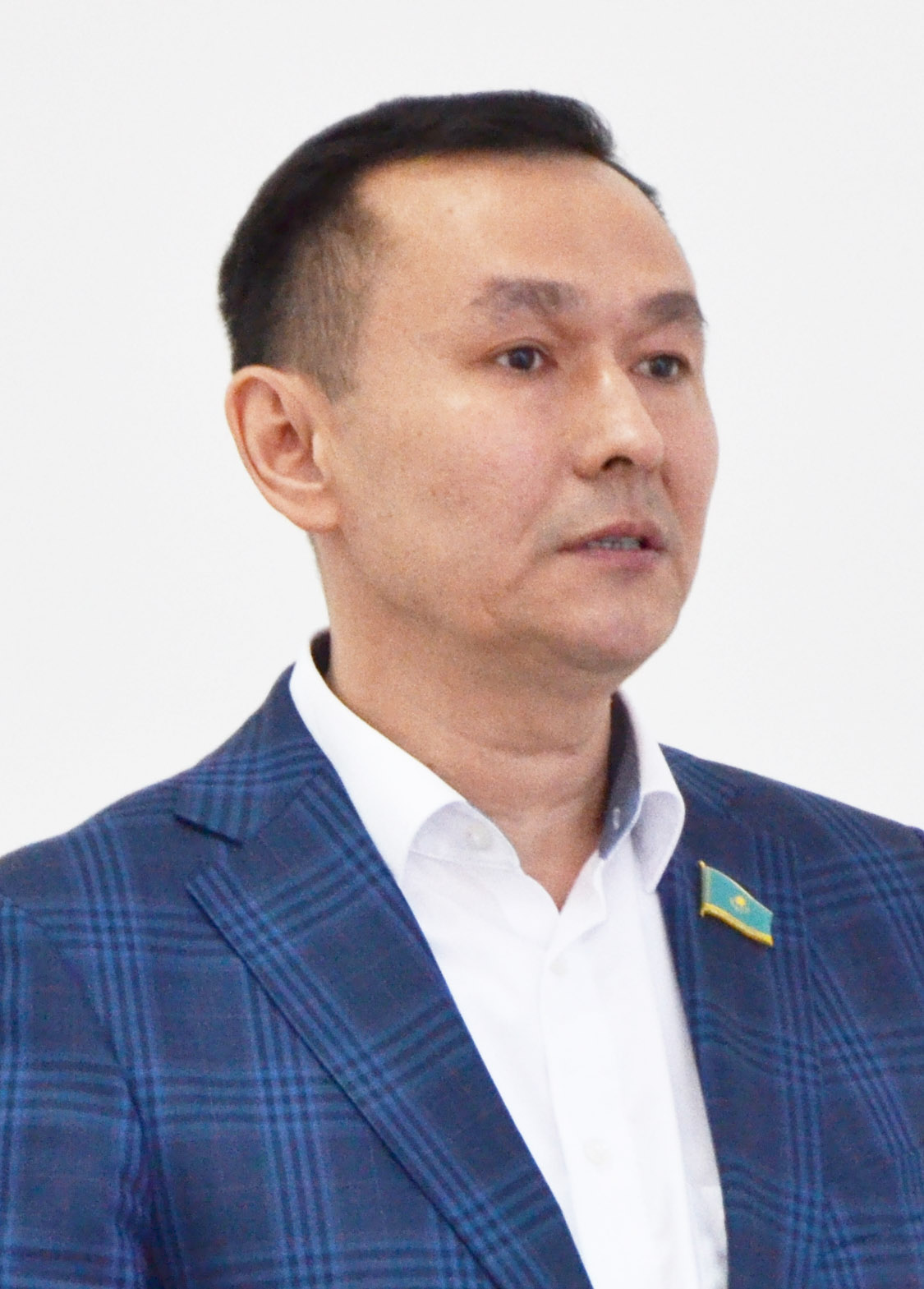
- Qoñyrov in 2019

Member of the Mäjilis
- In office 20 January 2012 – 2023

Leader of the People's Party in the Mäjilis
- In office 17 September 2018 – 2023
- Leader: Vladislav Kosarev; Himself; Ermūhamet Ertısbaev
- Preceded by: Vladislav Kosarev
- Succeeded by: Magherram Magherramov

Chairman of the People's Party
- In office 11 November 2020 – 27 March 2022
- First Deputy: Azat Köşekov
- Preceded by: Office established
- Succeeded by: Ermūhamet Ertısbaev

First Deputy Chairman of the People's Party
- Incumbent
- Assumed office 27 March 2022
- Chairman: Ermūhamet Ertısbaev
- Preceded by: Azat Köşekov

Secretary of the Central Committee of Communist People's Party
- In office 1 June 2013 – 11 November 2020

Personal details
- Born: 28 November 1972 (age 53) Kuibyshevskiy, Kazakh SSR, Soviet Union (now Novoishim, Kazakhstan)
- Party: People's Party (2004–present)
- Education: Kokshetau State University; Themis Law Academy of Karaganda

Aiqyn Oiratūly Qoñyrov (Kazakh: Айқын Ойратұлы Қоңыров; born 28 November 1972) is a Kazakh politician who is serving as a member of the Mäjilis from 2012 to 2023. He was the chairman of the People's Party of Kazakhstan (QHP) from 11 November 2020 before being succeeded by Ermūhamet Ertısbaev on 27 March 2022 and was the party's secretary from 2013 to 2020. He was the parliamentary leader of QHP in the Mäjilis from 17 September 2018 until he was succeeded by Magherram Magherramov.

== Biography ==
=== Early life and career ===
Qoñyrov was born in the village of Kuibyshevsky in the Kokshetau Region. After graduating from high school in 1989, he joined worked as a locksmith at the motor depot of the Kuybyshevsky District Agricultural Administration. In 1997, Qoñyrov graduated from Kokshetau State University and eventually attended the Themis Law Academy of Karaganda, where he received a law degree in 2005.

From 2004 to 2011, Qoñyrov was actively engaged in entrepreneurial activities and led the News Print LLP, which was responsible for the publication of the Moscow Komsomolets in Kazakh newspapers.

=== Political career ===
In 2004, Qoñyrov became a member of the Organizing Committee for the establishment of the Communist People's Party of Kazakhstan (QKHP) and the moment of the party's registration, he headed the apparatus of the Central Committee until 2012. During his tenure, from 2005 to 2006, Qoñyrov worked in Almaty as the second secretary of the city committee of Almaty and then became a member of the bureau of the QKHP Central Committee in 2008.

In the 2004 and 2007 legislative elections, Qoñyrov was amongst people that ran for MP from the QKHP for the lower house Mäjilis, though the party failed to win any seats during its early years. It wasn't until in 2012, as the QKHP managed to bypass the needed electoral threshold to enter the parliament resulted in Qoñyrov being elected as a lawmaker. During his first term in office, he served as a member of the Mäjilis Committee on Agricultural Issues.

On 17 September 2018, Qoñyrov became the parliamentary leader of the People's Communist Party, succeeding Vladislav Kosarev.

In April 2019, Qoñyrov stated that he considered running for president in the 2019 Kazakh presidential election, however, the QKHP chose Jambyl Ahmetbekov who had previously ran in 2011 to be the candidate.

On 11 November 2020, the QKHP changed its name to the People's Party of Kazakhstan. From there, Qoñyrov was unanimously elected as the party's chairman at its 15th Extraordinary Congress.

== Controversies ==
Qoñyrov in 2014 during an interview with Vlast.kz insisted that the Kazakh government wouldn't allow gay parades nor legalise same-sex marriage to influence the decision by the International Olympic Committee (IOC) in letting Kazakhstan hold the 2022 Winter Olympics while not ruling out the possibility of dropping Olympic bid, calling the IOC's demands "unfounded", asserting that the Kazakh society is against same-sex marriage and that the Communist People's Party of Kazakhstan (QKHP) would "unequivocally oppose it."

Following the 2016 shooting of Almaty police officers which sparked debate on capital punishment, Qoñyrov stressed that if a moratorium on death penalty in Kazakhstan is lifted, it would lead to "a serious blow to the image" to the country, suggesting that Kazakhstan's desire in being in top 30 list of countries in the OECD would be problematic as Qoñyrov noted that member countries within the organisation have no capital punishment in place.
