= Köşe Party =

Köşe Party Көше Партиясы
- Founded: 4 February 2020; 5 years ago
- Banned: 19 May 2020
- Ideology: Anti-corruption; Anti-authoritarianism; E-democracy
- National affiliation: Democratic Choice of Kazakhstan
- Colours: Light green Yellow

Köşe Party (Kazakh: Көше Партиясы, romanized: Köşe Partiasy, lit. 'Street Party', KP) is an unregistered political party in Kazakhstan that was founded by a group of political activists from the Democratic Choice of Kazakhstan (QDT) on 4 February 2020.

According to the party's activists, the Köşe Party serves as political movement that seeks to improve the quality of life within the country through peaceful means and that it has no leader. In spite of the party's will, the Kazakh government declared the Köşe Party's activities as extremist due to its ties with the QDT in May 2020 and as a result, the party was barred from operating within the country with reports of activists associated with the movement facing persecutions from the Kazakh authorities.

== History ==
According to the Köşe Party activist Ashat Jeksebaev, the organisation was formed on 4 February 2020 as a political movement that aimed at fighting corruption and transforming Kazakhstan into a democratic, parliamentary republic. The party gained its publicity on 8 February, when the leaflets were distributed around cities that contained the socio-political and economic programme of the Köşe Party as well as the release of political prisoners. The Köşe Party received endorsement from the Democratic Choice of Kazakhstan (QDT) leader Mukhtar Ablyazov.

On 19 May 2020, the Prosecutor General's Office of Kazakhstan announced that the Köşe Party was in fact, the already-banned QDT party of which was operating under the different name and as a result, the Köşe Party was declared illegal within the country, warning that any persons associated with the extremist movement would face criminal prosecution. The move received condemnation from the party's activists, claiming that the Kazakh authorities are wrongfully accusing of party doing illegal actions in which the Köşe Party denied allegations. As a result, the party filed an appeal against the district court's decision on 25 May.

== Goals ==
According to the party's manifesto, it called for loans and mortgages worth up to 30 million tenge to be forgiven, an increase salaries for teachers and doctors to 400,000 tenge, benefits for people with disabilities and unemployment. It has also positioned its support for universal health care and free education for all citizens. According to Köşe Party activist Anna Şökeeva, the party aims at peaceful change of power with a parliamentary form of government where people are given the opportunities "to decide and govern themselves".
