= Crossover voting =

Term in United States primary elections

In primary elections in the United States, crossover voting refers to a behavior in which voters cast ballots for a party with which they are not traditionally affiliated. Even in the instance of closed primary elections, in which voters are required to receive a ballot matching their political party, crossover voting may still take place, but requires the additional step of voters to change their political affiliation ahead of the primary election.

== Rationale ==
The motives for crossover voting take on many forms. Crossover votes are often strategic, though not necessarily so. It has been proposed that "mischievous" crossover voting is limited.

=== Strategic ===
==== Insurance ====
Insurance-purposed crossovers occur when voters see the results of their own party's primary as a foregone conclusion; for example, a candidate belonging to their party is greatly favored or running unopposed, so their best strategy is to cast a ballot for an opposing party. Two types of insurance-purposed crossover voters exist:

- "Second Best" voters cross over to vote for an opposing candidate they would prefer over other options in the opposing party, should their own party's candidate lose in the general election. They may be attempting to prevent a candidate they dislike in the opposing party from reaching the general election.
- "Positive Strategic" voters are unhappy with their own party's leading candidate, and do not see their preferred alternative as viable. Thus, they cross over to vote for a candidate who they think will stand a chance in the general election.

==== Party raiding ====
Party raiding is a tactic where members of one party attempt to sabotage another party's primary by voting for an opposing candidate they do not see as standing a chance against their party's candidate, or voting so as to prolong divided support between two or more contenders for that party's nomination (especially for president).

A notable example of attempted party raiding was Operation Chaos in the Democratic primary in 2008, when Rush Limbaugh encouraged Republicans to vote for Hillary Clinton in an effort to weaken Barack Obama politically. The effort was ultimately unsuccessful. Another occurred in the 2012 Republican primaries, where many Democratic voters in Michigan voted for weaker GOP candidate Rick Santorum over front-runner Mitt Romney in order to disrupt Romney's campaign. This attempt was also unsuccessful.

=== Genuine ===
In some instances, crossover voting may occur when voters feel that the candidate from the opposing party is better. These crossover voters are referred to as "True Supporters", and are not casting their votes for purposes of insurance or sabotage.

In some instances, crossover voting may also occur because no candidate registered with a voter's relevant party filed; therefore if they prefer not to abstain from voting, they must back a candidate from a party other than their own. This form of crossover voting has been referred to as "No Option".

== See also ==
- Conscience vote
- Crossing the floor
- Entryism
- Floor crossing
- Trasformismo
- Waka-jumping
