= First Massimov Government =

Government of Kazakhstan

- 9th Cabinet of Kazakhstan
- 2007–2011
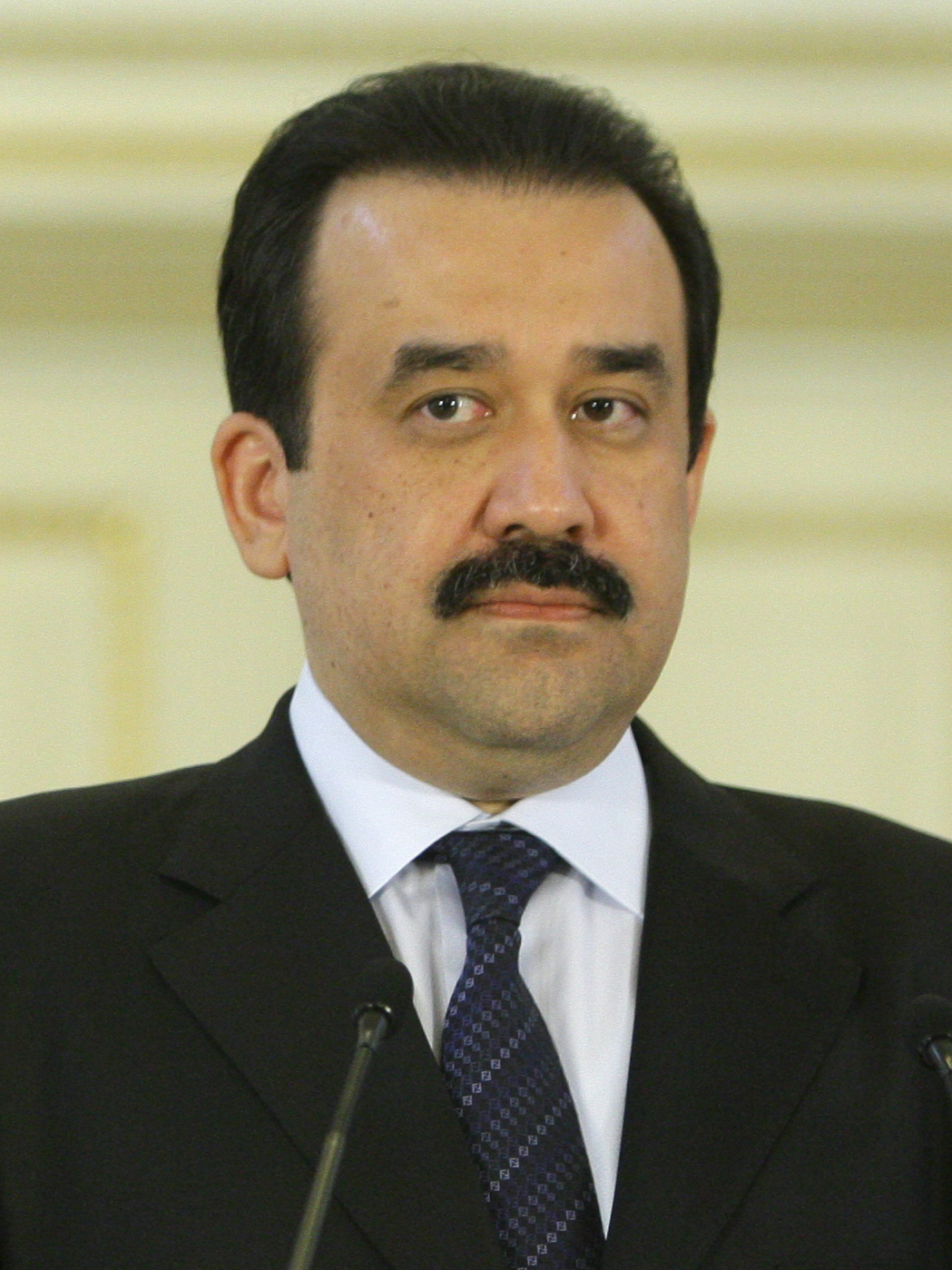
- Date formed: 10 January 2007
- Date dissolved: 8 April 2011

People and organisations
- Head of state: Nursultan Nazarbayev
- Head of government: Karim Massimov
- Deputy head of government: Umirzak Shukeyev; Serik Akhmetov
- Member party: Nur Otan
- Status in legislature: Supermajority

History
- Predecessor: Akhmetov II
- Successor: Massimov II

The First Massimov Government (Kazakh: Мәсімов бірінші үкіметі, romanized: Mäsımov bırınşı ükımetı; Russian: Первое правительство Масимова) was the 9th government of Kazakhstan, led by Prime Minister Karim Massimov. The change in cabinet was a result of the 2007 Kazakh political shakeup where Massimov's predecessor Daniyal Akhmetov resigned unexpectedly from office on 8 January 2007. Observers believed that it was due to Akhmetov's exhaustion and increasing criticism from President Nursultan Nazarbayev over Akhmetov's oversight of the economy. Nazarbayev nominated Massimov to be the Prime Minister on 9 January who was then confirmed by the Parliament the next day on 10 January.

The government lasted until 24 September 2012, when Massimov was appointed as the Head of the Presidential Administration, making him the longest person in Kazakhstan to hold office as the Prime Minister. Massimov was succeeded by his First Deputy Serik Akhmetov that day, after being approved by the Parliament to form a new cabinet.

== Composition ==
Functions	Holder	Start	End
Prime Minister	Karim Massimov	11 January 2007	24 September 2012
First Deputy Prime Minister	Umirzak Shukeyev	3 March 2009	26 December 2011
Deputy Prime Minister	Aslan Musin	10 January 2007	27 August 2007
Deputy Prime Minister	Umirzak Shukeyev	27 August 2007	3 March 2009
Deputy Prime Minister	Yerbol Orynbayev	29 October 2007	6 October 2008
Deputy Prime Minister	Serik Akhmetov	3 March 2009	19 November 2009
Prime Minister's Office	Yerbol Orynbayev	11 January 2007	29 October 2007
Prime Minister's Office	Yerbol Orynbayev	6 October 2008	11 April 2011
Ministry of Foreign Affairs	Marat Tajin	11 January 2007	4 September 2009
Ministry of Foreign Affairs	Kanat Saudabayev	4 September 2009	11 April 2011
Ministry of Defense	Daniyal Akhmetov	10 January 2007	24 June 2009
Ministry of Defense	Adilbek Zhaksybekov	24 June 2009	2 April 2014
Ministry of Emergency Situations	Viktor Khrapunov	11 January 2007	1 November 2007
Ministry of Emergency Situations	Vladimir Bozhko	13 November 2007	6 August 2014
Ministry of Internal Affairs	Bauyrzhan Mukhamedzhanov	14 October 2005	2 April 2009
Ministry of Internal Affairs	Serik Baimagambetov	2 April 2009	11 April 2011
Ministry of Agriculture	Akhmetzhan Yessimov	19 January 2006	4 April 2008
Ministry of Agriculture	Ahylbek Kushirbaev	8 April 2008	8 April 2011
Ministry of Justice	Zagipa Baliyeva	14 April 2005	2 April 2009
Ministry of Justice	Rashid Tusupbekov	2 April 2009	20 January 2012
Ministry of Education and Science	Byrganym Aitimova	13 December 2004	19 January 2007
Ministry of Education and Science	Zhanseit Tuymenbayev	19 January 2007	22 September 2010
Ministry of Education and Science	Bakhytzhan Zhumagulov	22 September 2010	2 September 2013
Ministry of Healthcare	Anatoly Dernovoi	20 September 2006	20 November 2008
Ministry of Healthcare	Jaqsylyq Dosqaliev	20 November 2008	7 October 2010
Ministry of Healthcare	Salidat Qaiyrbekova	7 October 2010	6 August 2014
Ministry of Labour and Social Protection of the Population	Gulzhan Karagusova	22 November 2001	12 July 2007
Ministry of Labour and Social Protection of the Population	Berdibek Saparbayev	27 August 2007	4 March 2009
Ministry of Labour and Social Protection of the Population	Gulshara Abdykhalikova	4 March 2009	26 September 2012
Ministry of Transport and Communications	Serik Akhmetov	25 September 2006	3 March 2009
Ministry of Transport and Communications	Äbilgazy Qusaiynov	3 March 2009	8 April 2011
Ministry of Industry and Trade	Galym Orazbakov	10 January 2007	19 February 2008
Ministry of Industry and Trade	Vladimir Shkolnik	19 February 2008	21 May 2009
Ministry of Industry and Trade	Asset Issekeshev	21 May 2009	12 March 2010
Ministry of Industry and New Technologies	Asset Issekeshev	12 March 2010	6 August 2014
Ministry of Culture and Information	Ermukhamet Ertysbayev	23 March 2006	12 May 2008
Ministry of Culture and Information	Mukhtar Kul-Mukhammed	12 May 2008	13 March 2010
Ministry of Culture	Mukhtar Kul-Mukhammed	13 March 2010	23 January 2012
Ministry of Finance	Natalya Korzhova	18 January 2006	14 November 2007
Ministry of Finance	Bolat Zhamishev	16 November 2007	6 November 2013
Ministry of Economy and Budget Planning	Aslan Musin	4 October 2006	10 August 2007
Ministry of Economy and Budget Planning	Bakhyt Sultanov	10 August 2007	12 March 2010
Ministry of Economic Development and Trade	Zhanar Aitzhanova	12 March 2010	8 April 2011
Ministry of Environmental Protection	Nurlan Iskakov	3 April 2006	4 March 2009
Ministry of Environmental Protection	Nurgali Ashimov	4 March 2009	14 January 2012
Ministry of Oil and Gas	Sauat Mynbayev	12 March 2010	3 July 2013
