= Second Massimov Government =

Government of Kazakhstan

- 10th Cabinet of Kazakhstan
- 2011–2012
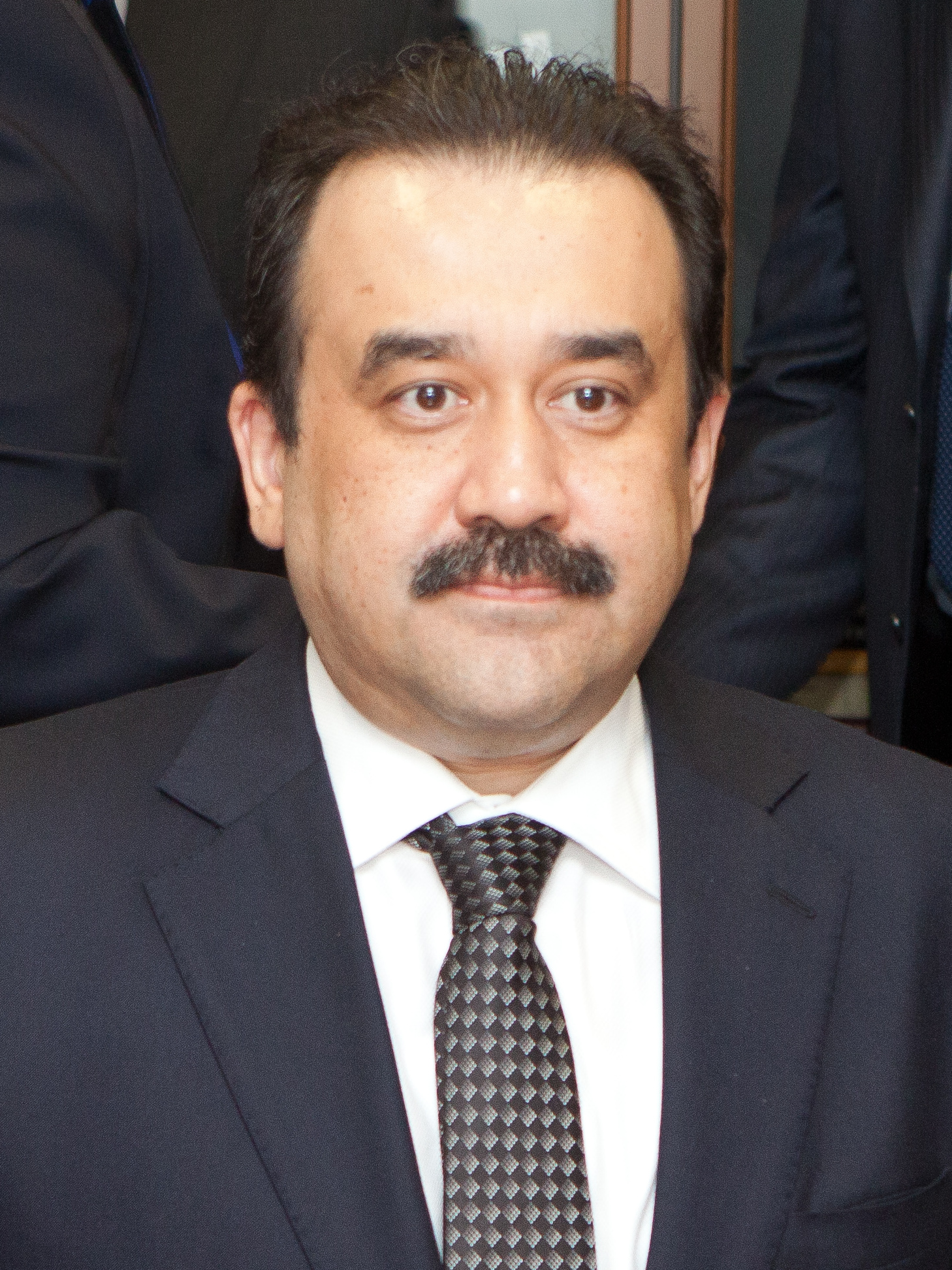
- Date formed: 8 April 2011
- Date dissolved: 24 September 2012

People and organisations
- Head of state: Nursultan Nazarbayev
- Head of government: Karim Massimov
- Deputy head of government: Umirzak Shukeyev; Serik Akhmetov
- Member party: Nur Otan
- Status in legislature: Supermajority

History
- Predecessor: Massimov I
- Successor: Ahmetov

The Second Massimov Government (Kazakh: Мәсімов екінші үкіметі, romanized: Mäsımov ekınşı ükımetı; Russian: Второе правительство Масимова) was the 9th government of Kazakhstan, led by Prime Minister Karim Massimov. It was formed on 8 April 2011 following Massimov's reappointment by President Nursultan Nazarbayev after the 2011 presidential election. Massimov's nomination was approved by the Parliament on the same day. The composition of the government was announced on 12 April, with many ministers retaining their positions.

The government lasted until 24 September 2012, when Massimov was appointed as the Head of the Presidential Administration, making him the longest person in Kazakhstan to hold office as the Prime Minister. Massimov was succeeded by his First Deputy Serik Akhmetov that day, after being approved by the Parliament to form a new cabinet.

== Composition ==
Functions	Holder	Start	End
Prime Minister	Karim Massimov	8 April 2011	24 September 2012
First Deputy Prime Minister	Umirzak Shukeyev	11 April 2011	26 December 2011
First Deputy Prime Minister	Serik Akhmetov	20 January 2012	24 September 2012
Deputy Prime Minister	Yerbol Orynbayev	11 April 2011	28 November 2013
Deputy Prime Minister	Serik Akhmetov	11 April 2011	19 November 2009
Deputy Prime Minister	Krymbek Kusherbayev	20 January 2012	26 September 2012
Deputy Prime Minister	Kairat Kelimbetov	20 January 2012	1 October 2013
Prime Minister's Office	Gabidulla Abdrakhimov	11 April 2011	2 February 2012
Prime Minister's Office	Erlan Qoşanov	2 January 2012	27 March 2017
Ministry of Foreign Affairs	Marat Tajin	11 April 2011	4 September 2009
Ministry of Foreign Affairs	Yerzhan Kazykhanov	11 April 2011	24 September 2012
Ministry of Defense	Adilbek Zhaksybekov	11 April 2011	2 April 2014
Ministry of Emergency Situations	Vladimir Bozhko	11 April 2011	6 August 2014
Ministry of Internal Affairs	Kalmukhambet Kassymov	11 April 2011	12 February 2019
Ministry of Agriculture	Asyljan Mamytbekov	11 April 2011	6 May 2016
Ministry of Justice	Rashid Tusupbekov	11 April 2011	20 January 2012
Ministry of Justice	Berik Imashev	20 January 2012	13 September 2016
Ministry of Education and Science	Bakhytzhan Zhumagulov	11 April 2011	2 September 2013
Ministry of Healthcare	Salidat Qaiyrbekova	11 April 2011	6 August 2014
Ministry of Labour and Social Protection of the Population	Gulshara Abdykhalikova	11 April 2011	26 September 2012
Ministry of Transport and Communications	Berik Kamaliev	12 April 2011	20 January 2012
Ministry of Transport and Communications	Askar Zhumagaliyev	21 January 2012	7 March 2014
Ministry of Industry and Trade	Galym Orazbakov	10 January 2007	19 February 2008
Ministry of Industry and New Technologies	Asset Issekeshev	11 April 2011	6 August 2014
Ministry of Culture and Information	Darhan Mynbai	23 January 2012	16 January 2013
Ministry of Culture	Mukhtar Kul-Mukhammed	11 April 2011	23 January 2012
Ministry of Economic Integration	Zhanar Aitzhanova	16 April 2011	11 May 2016
Ministry of Finance	Bolat Zhamishev	11 April 2011	6 November 2013
Ministry of Economic Development and Trade	Kairat Kelimbetov	11 April 2011	20 January 2012
Ministry of Economic Development and Trade	Bakhytzhan Sagintayev	20 January 2012	24 September 2012
Ministry of Environmental Protection	Nurgali Ashimov	11 April 2011	14 January 2012
Ministry of Environmental Protection	Nurlan Kapparov	20 January 2012	19 November 2013
Ministry of Oil and Gas	Sauat Mynbayev	11 April 2011	3 July 2013
