= Tasmagambetov Government =

Government of Kazakhstan

- 7th Cabinet of Kazakhstan
- 2002–2003
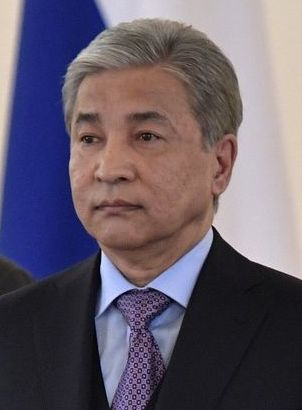
- Date formed: 28 January 2002
- Date dissolved: 16 June 2003

People and organisations
- Head of state: Nursultan Nazarbayev
- Head of government: Imangali Tasmagambetov
- Deputy head of government: Aleksandr Pavlov
- Member party: Otan
- Status in legislature: Minority
- Opposition party: Communist
- Opposition leader: Serikbolsyn Abdildin

History
- Predecessor: Tokayev
- Successor: Akhmetov

The Tasmagambetov Government (Kazakh: Тасмағамбетов Үкіметі, romanized: Tasmağambetov Ükımetı; Russian: Правительство Тасмагамбетова) was the 5th government of Kazakhstan. Led by Prime Minister Imangali Tasmagambetov, it was formed on 28 January 2002 after his predecessor Kassym-Jomart Tokayev stepped down from his post along with his entire cabinet. President Nursultan Nazarbayev nominated Tasmagmabetov for office to which it was unanimously approved by the Parliament. Prior to that, Tasmagambetov served as the Deputy PM under Tokayev's cabinet. It was believed that the cause of the change in the government was an attempt to strengthen its stability as it faced opposition from political groups.

On 11 June 2003, Tasmagambetov resigned after failing to persuade the Parliament to pass a bill in a form desired by President Nazarbayev that would've privatized land in Kazakhstan. He accused of the Parliament for falsifying the vote which took place on 19 May. Nazarbayev appointed Daniyal Akhmetov as the Acting PM who was confirmed by the Parliament on 13 June to form the 6th government. Tasmagambetov that day was appointed as the State Secretary.

== Composition ==
Functions	Holder	Start	End
Prime Minister	Imangali Tasmagambetov	28 January 2002	11 June 2003
First Deputy Prime Minister	Aleksandr Pavlov	28 August 2002	6 January 2004
Deputy Prime Minister	Karim Massimov	27 November 2001	June 2003
Deputy Prime Minister	Aleksandr Pavlov	29 January 2002	28 August 2002
Deputy Prime Minister	Bauyrzhan Mukhamedzhanov	29 January 2002	June 2003
Deputy Prime Minister	Akhmetzhan Yessimov	28 May 2002	19 January 2006
Prime Minister's Office	Altai Tleuberdin	13 December 2000	10 January 2007
Ministry of Foreign Affairs	Erlan Idrissov	12 October 1999	29 January 2002
Ministry of Foreign Affairs	Kassym-Jomart Tokayev	29 January 2002	11 January 2007
Ministry of Defense	Mukhtar Altynbayev	8 December 2001	10 January 2007
Ministry of Internal Affairs	Kairbek Suleimenov	30 January 2002	12 September 2003
Ministry of Agriculture	Akhmetzhan Yessimov	18 May 2001	14 May 2004
Ministry of Justice	Georgy Kim	29 January 2002	25 February 2003
Ministry of Justice	Onalsyn Zhumabekov	25 February 2003	April 2005
Ministry of Education and Science	Shamsha Berkimbaeva	30 January 2002	14 June 2003
Ministry of Healthcare	Jaqsylyq Doskaliev	17 October 2001	4 April 2004
Ministry of Labour and Social Protection of the Population	Gulzhan Karagusova	22 November 2001	12 July 2007
Ministry of Transport and Communications	Ablai Myrzahmetov	November 2001	16 April 2002
Ministry of Transport and Communications	Qajymurat Nagymanov	18 May 2002	25 May 2005
Ministry of Industry and Trade	Majit Esenbaev	28 August 2002	June 2003
Ministry of Industry and Trade	Adilbek Zhakysbekov	16 June 2003	December 2004
Ministry of Industry and Trade	Sauat Mynbayev	14 December 2004	January 2006
Ministry of Culture, Information and Public Accord	Mukhtar Kul-Mukhammed	4 May 2001	13 September 2003
Ministry of Culture, Information and Sports	Mukhtar Kul-Mukhammed	13 September 2003	29 September 2004
Ministry of Finance	Aleksandr Pavlov	29 January 2002	27 August 2002
Ministry of Economy and Trade	Majit Esenbaev	30 January 2002	28 August 2002
Ministry of Economy and Budget Planning	Kairat Kelimbetov	28 August 2002	18 April 2006
Ministry of Natural Resources and Environmental Protection	Andar Shoqpytov	22 December 2000	August 2000
Ministry of Environmental Protection	Aitkul Samakova	29 August 2002	1 February 2006
