= Sagintayev Government =

Government of Kazakhstan

- 14th Cabinet of Kazakhstan
- 2016–2019
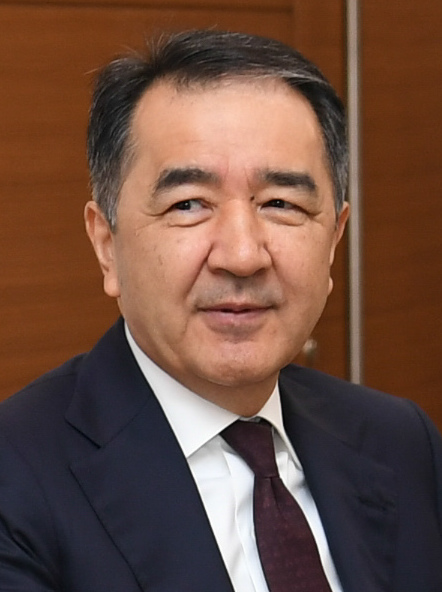
- Date formed: 9 September 2016
- Date dissolved: 25 February 2019

People and organisations
- Head of state: Nursultan Nazarbayev
- Head of government: Bakhytzhan Sagintayev; Asqar Mamin (acting)
- Deputy head of government: Asqar Mamin
- Member party: Nur Otan
- Status in legislature: Supermajority

History
- Predecessor: Massimov IV
- Successor: Mamin

The Sagintayev Government (Kazakh: Сағынтаев Үкіметі, romanized: Sağyntaev Ükımetı; Russian: Правительство Сагинтаева) was the 10th composition of the Government of Kazakhstan under the leadership of Prime Minister Bakhytzhan Sagintayev. It was formed after Sagintayev's predecessor, Karim Massimov was appointed as a head of the National Security Committee on 8 September 2016. President Nursultan Nazarbayev nominated Sagintayev, who served as the First Deputy under Massimov's government to be the new prime minister. He was confirmed by the Parliament the following day on 9 September. Some speculated that Sagintayev was a close ally to Nazarbayev's daughter Dariga, and the reason for a cabinet reshuffle was to make way for Nazarbayev's succession after the neighboring country of Uzbekistan faced a political uncertainty over President Islam Karimov's death which occurred on 2 September.

On 21 February 2019, as a result of growing public dismay, President Nazarbayev dismissed Sagintayev and instead appointed Askar Mamin as the acting prime minister who was approved by the Parliament on 25 February, thus forming a new government.

== Composition ==
Functions	Holder	Start	End
Prime Minister	Bakhytzhan Sagintayev	8 September 2016	21 February 2019
Prime Minister (acting)	Askar Mamin	21 February 2019	25 February 2019
First Deputy Prime Minister	Askar Mamin	8 September 2016	25 February 2019
Deputy Prime Minister	Dariga Nazarbayeva	11 September 2015	13 September 2016
Deputy Prime Minister	Askar Myrzakhmetov	14 June 2016	15 December 2017
Deputy Prime Minister	Imangali Tasmagambetov	13 September 2016	3 February 2017
Deputy Prime Minister	Askar Zhumagaliyev	29 August 2017	25 February 2019
Deputy Prime Minister	Erbolat Dosaev	29 August 2017	25 February 2019
Prime Minister's Office	Erlan Qoşanov	2 January 2012	27 March 2017
Prime Minister's Office	Nurlan Aldabergenov	27 March 2017	1 March 2019
Ministry of Foreign Affairs	Erlan Idrissov	4 April 2014	28 December 2016
Ministry of Foreign Affairs	Kairat Abdrakhmanov	28 December 2016	26 December 2018
Ministry of Foreign Affairs	Beibut Atamkulov	26 December 2018	18 September 2019
Ministry of Defense	Imangali Tasmagambetov	22 October 2014	12 September 2016
Ministry of Defense	Saken Zhasuzakov	13 September 2016	7 August 2018
Ministry of Defense	Nurlan Yermekbayev	7 August 2018	Present
Ministry of Internal Affairs	Kalmukhambet Kassymov	4 April 2014	12 February 2019
Ministry of Internal Affairs	Erlan Turgymbaev	12 February 2019	Present
Ministry of Information and Communications	Dauren Abaev	6 May 2016	25 February 2019
Ministry of Social Development	Nurlan Yermekbayev	13 September 2016	4 April 2018
Ministry of Social Development	Darhan Kaletaev	4 April 2018	25 February 2019
Ministry of Agriculture	Askar Myrzakhmetov	6 May 2016	15 December 2017
Ministry of Agriculture	Umirzak Shukeyev	15 December 2017	25 February 2019
Ministry of Justice	Berik Imashev	20 January 2012	13 September 2016
Ministry of Justice	Marat Beketaev	13 September 2016	Present
Ministry of Education and Science	Erlan Sağadiev	10 February 2016	25 February 2019
Ministry of Health and Social Development	Tamara Duisenova	6 August 2014	25 January 2017
Ministry of Healthcare	Eljan Birtanov	25 January 2017	25 June 2020
Ministry of Labour and Social Protection of the Population	Tamara Duisenova	25 January 2017	9 February 2018
Ministry of Labour and Social Protection of the Population	Madina Abilqasymova	9 February 2018	22 February 2019
Ministry of Industry and Infrastructure Development	Zhenis Kassymbek	21 June 2016	25 February 2019
Ministry of Finance	Bakhyt Sultanov	6 November 2013	18 September 2018
Ministry of Finance	Alihan Smaiylov	18 September 2018	18 May 2020
Ministry of Culture and Sports	Arystanbek Muhamediuly	6 August 2014	17 June 2019
Ministry of National Economy	Kuandyk Bishimbayev	6 May 2016	28 December 2016
Ministry of National Economy	Timur Suleimenov	28 December 2016	25 February 2019
Ministry of Defense and Aerospace Industry	Beibut Atamkulov	7 October 2016	26 December 2018
Ministry of Defense and Aerospace Industry	Askar Zhumagaliyev	17 June 2019	17 June 2019
Ministry of Energy	Kanat Bozumbayev	25 March 2016	18 December 2019

Preceded by Massimov II Cabinet	Sagintayev Cabinet; 2016 — 2019	Succeeded by Mamin Cabinet
