= Tokayev Government =

Government of Kazakhstan

- 5th Cabinet of Kazakhstan
- 1999–2002
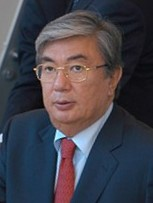
- Date formed: 12 October 1999
- Date dissolved: 28 January 2002

People and organisations
- Head of state: Nursultan Nazarbayev
- Head of government: Kassym-Jomart Tokayev
- Deputy head of government: Aleksandr Pavlov; Daniyal Akhmetov; Imangali Tasmagambetov
- Member party: Otan; Independents
- Status in legislature: Minority
- Opposition party: Communist Party
- Opposition leader: Serikbolsyn Abdildin

History
- Predecessor: Balgimbayev II
- Successor: Tasmagambetov

The Tokayev Government was the 5th government of Kazakhstan under the leadership of Kassym-Jomart Tokayev. It was formed shortly after Prime Minister Nurlan Balgimbayev resigned from his post on 1 October 1999 shortly before the legislative election to become the president of Kazakhoil. President Nursultan Nazarbayev named Kassym-Jomart Tokayev as the Acting Prime Minister, who, prior to that, served as the Deputy Prime Minister as well as the Minister of Foreign Affairs under Balgimbayev's cabinet. On 12 October, the Parliament approved Tokayev's nomination to the post of the PM.

On 20 November 2001, Tokayev threatened to resign if Nazarbayev would not dismiss several government officials who formed Democratic Choice of Kazakhstan (QDT) as he accused of them of working for the "outsiders", which sparked a political crisis. In December 2001, Nazarbayev removed several cabinet members such as Deputy Prime Minister Oraz Jandosov and Deputy Defense Minister Jannat Ertlesova. On 28 January 2002, Tokayev himself resigned stating that "it was time for new people with new ideas" without further explanations. That same day, he was appointed as the State Secretary and Foreign Affairs Minister, while his successor, Imangali Tasmagambetov, became the new PM.

== Composition ==
Functions	Holder	Start	End
Prime Minister	Kassym-Jomart Tokayev	12 October 1999	28 January 2002
First Deputy Prime Minister	Aleksandr Pavlov	12 October 1999	November 2000
First Deputy Prime Minister	Daniyal Akhmetov	21 December 2000	21 November 2001
Deputy Prime Minister	Erik Otembaev	October 1999	December 2000
Deputy Prime Minister	Daniyal Akhmetov	October 1999	December 2000
Deputy Prime Minister	Oraz Jandosov	December 2000	November 2001
Deputy Prime Minister	Imangali Tasmagambetov	December 2000	January 2002
Deputy Prime Minister	Vladimir Shkolnik	December 2000	January 2002
Deputy Prime Minister	Karim Massimov	27 November 2001	June 2003
Prime Minister's Office	Kanat Saudabayev	13 October 1999	13 December 2000
Prime Minister's Office	Altai Tleuberdin	13 December 2000	10 January 2007
Ministry of Foreign Affairs	Erlan Idrissov	12 October 1999	29 January 2002
Ministry of Defense	Sat Tokpakbayev	13 October 1999	8 December 2001
Ministry of Defense	Mukhtar Altynbayev	8 December 2001	10 January 2007
Ministry of Internal Affairs	Kairbek Suleimenov	October 1995	December 2000
Ministry of Internal Affairs	Bulat Iskakov	December 2000	January 2002
Ministry of Internal Affairs	Kairbek Suleimenov	January 2002	12 September 2003
Ministry of Agriculture	Sauat Mynbayev	July 1999	May 2001
Ministry of Agriculture	Akhmetzhan Yessimov	18 May 2001	14 May 2004
Ministry of Justice	Bauyrzhan Mukhamedzhanov	October 1997	September 2000
Ministry of Justice	Igor Rogov	13 September 2000	29 January 2002
Ministry of Education and Science	Krymbek Kusherbayev	October 1999	18 December 2000
Ministry of Education and Science	Nuraly Bekturganov	18 December 2000	January 2002
Ministry of Healthcare	Jaqsylyq Doskaliev	17 October 2001	4 April 2004
Ministry of Labour and Social Protection of the Population	Nikolai Radostovets	October 1999	August 2000
Ministry of Labour and Social Protection of the Population	Alikhan Baimenov	August 2000	November 2001
Ministry of Labour and Social Protection of the Population	Gulzhan Karagusova	22 November 2001	12 July 2007
Ministry of Transport and Communications	Serik Burkitbaev	September 1998	August 2000
Ministry of Transport and Communications	Karim Massimov	7 August 2000	27 November 2001
Ministry of Transport and Communications	Ablai Myrzahmetov	November 2001	April 2002
Ministry of Culture, Information and Public Accord	Altynbek Sarsenbayuly	January 1999	May 2001
Ministry of Culture, Information and Public Accord	Mukhtar Kul-Mukhammed	4 May 2001	13 September 2003
Ministry of Finance	Aleksandr Pavlov	29 January 2002	27 August 2002
Ministry of Economy	Zhaksybek Kulekeyev	13 October 1999	December 2000
Ministry of Economy and Trade	Zhaksybek Kulekeyev	December 2000	January 2002
Ministry of Energy, Industry and Trade	Vladimir Shkolnik	October 1999	13 December 1999
Ministry of Energy and Mineral Resources	Vladimir Shkolnik	13 December 1999	19 January 2006
Ministry of Natural Resources and Environmental Protection	Serikbek Daukeev	22 January 1999	22 December 2000
Ministry of Natural Resources and Environmental Protection	Andar Shoqpytov	22 December 2000	August 2000
