= Serik Akhmetov Government =

Government of Kazakhstan

- 11th Cabinet of Kazakhstan
- 2012–2014
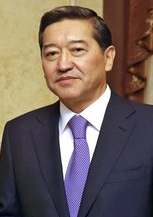
- Date formed: 24 September 2012
- Date dissolved: 2 April 2014

People and organisations
- Head of state: Nursultan Nazarbayev
- Head of government: Serik Akhmetov
- Deputy head of government: Krymbek Kusherbayev; Bakhytzhan Sagintayev
- Member party: Nur Otan
- Status in legislature: Supermajority

History
- Predecessor: Massimov II
- Successor: Massimov III

The Serik Akhmetov Government (Kazakh: Серік Ахметов Үкіметі, romanized: Serık Ahmetov Ükımetı; Russian: Правительство Серика Ахметова) was the 11th government of Kazakhstan led by Serik Akhmetov. It was established on 24 September 2012, after Prime Minister Karim Massimov resigned from the post which he had held since January 2007 and was appointed as the Head of the Presidential Administration. President Nursultan Nazarbayev nominated Akhmetov to be the new PM who was unanimously approved by the Parliament.

As a result of the Kazakh tenge's devaluation in March 2014, Akhmetov was dismissed by Nazarbayev who reappointed Massimov on 2 April 2014. Akhmetov remained in Massimov's cabinet after being appointed as the Minister of Defense on 3 April 2014.

== Composition ==
Functions	Holder	Start	End
Prime Minister	Serik Akhmetov	24 September 2012	2 April 2014
First Deputy Prime Minister	Krymbek Kusherbayev	26 September 2012	16 January 2013
First Deputy Prime Minister	Bakhytzhan Sagintayev	16 January 2013	8 September 2016
Deputy Prime Minister	Asset Isskeshev	12 March 2010	6 August 2014
Deputy Prime Minister	Yerbol Orynbayev	11 April 2011	28 November 2013
Deputy Prime Minister	Krymbek Kusherbayev	20 January 2012	26 September 2012
Deputy Prime Minister	Kairat Kelimbetov	20 January 2012	1 October 2013
Deputy Prime Minister	Bakhyt Sultanov	6 November 2013	11 November 2018
Deputy Prime Minister	Gulshara Abdykhalikova	28 November 2013	11 November 2014
Prime Minister's Office	Erlan Qoşanov	2 January 2012	27 March 2017
Ministry of Foreign Affairs	Erlan Idrissov	28 September 2012	28 December 2016
Ministry of Defense	Adilbek Zhaksybekov	24 June 2009	2 April 2014
Ministry of Emergency Situations	Vladimir Bozhko	13 November 2007	6 August 2014
Ministry of Internal Affairs	Kalmukhambet Kassymov	11 April 2011	12 February 2019
Ministry of Agriculture	Asyljan Mamytbekov	11 April 2011	6 May 2016
Ministry of Justice	Berik Imashev	20 January 2012	13 September 2016
Ministry of Education and Science	Bakhytzhan Zhumagulov	22 September 2010	2 September 2013
Ministry of Education and Science	Aslan Särınjıpov	2 September 2013	10 February 2016
Ministry of Healthcare	Salidat Qaiyrbekova	7 October 2010	6 August 2014
Ministry of Labour and Social Protection of the Population	Gulshara Abdykhalikova	4 March 2009	26 September 2012
Ministry of Labour and Social Protection of the Population	Serik Abdenov	26 September 2012	10 June 2013
Ministry of Labour and Social Protection of the Population	Tamara Duysenova	27 June 2013	6 August 2014
Ministry of Transport and Communications	Askar Zhumagaliyev	21 January 2012	7 March 2014
Ministry of Transport and Communications	Zhenis Kassymbek	7 March 2014	6 August 2014
Ministry of Industry and New Technologies	Asset Issekeshev	12 March 2010	6 August 2014
Ministry of Economic Integration	Zhanar Aitzhanova	16 April 2011	11 May 2016
Ministry of Culture and Information	Darhan Mynbai	23 January 2012	16 January 2013
Ministry of Culture and Information	Mukhtar Kul-Mukhammed	16 January 2013	13 March 2014
Ministry of Culture and Information	Arystanbek Muhamediuly	13 March 2014	6 August 2014
Ministry of Finance	Bolat Zhamishev	16 November 2007	6 November 2013
Ministry of Finance	Bakhyt Sultanov	6 November 2013	11 November 2018
Minister of Economic Development and Trade	Erbolat Dosaev	25 September 2012	16 January 2013
Ministry of Economy and Budget Planning	Erbolat Dosaev	16 January 2013	6 August 2014
Ministry of Oil and Gas	Sauat Mynbayev	12 March 2010	3 July 2013
Ministry of Oil and Gas	Uzakbay Karabalin	3 July 2013	4 August 2014
