= First Mamin Government =

Government of Kazakhstan

- 15th Cabinet of Kazakhstan
- 2019–2021
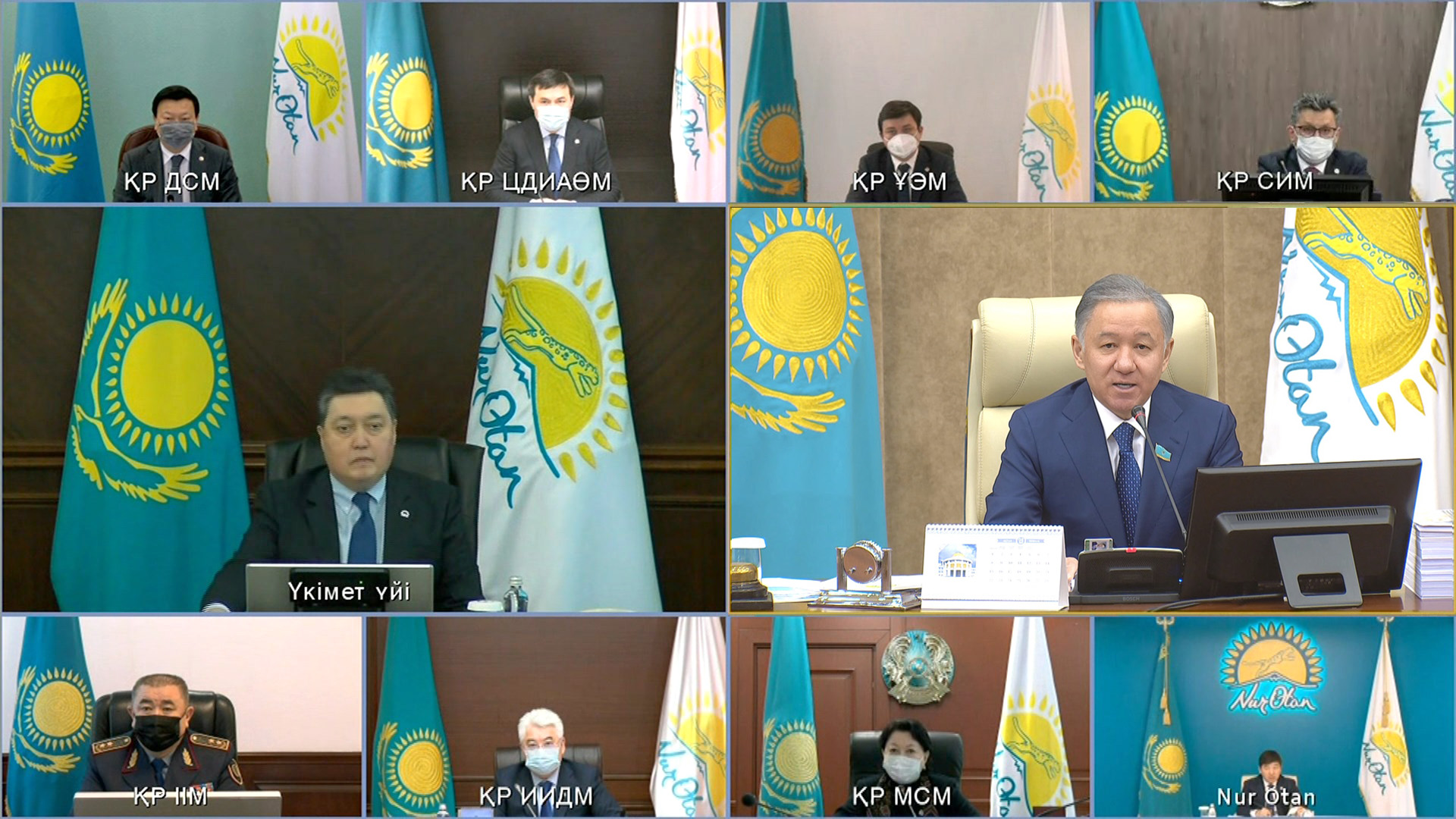
- First Mamin Government attends a Nur Otan faction meeting, February 2021
- Date formed: 25 February 2019
- Date dissolved: 15 January 2021

People and organisations
- Head of state: Nursultan Nazarbayev; Kassym-Jomart Tokayev
- Head of government: Askar Mamin
- Deputy head of government: Alihan Smaiylov
- Total no. of members: 20
- Member party: Nur Otan
- Status in legislature: Supermajority
- Opposition party: Aq Jol
- Opposition leader: Azat Peruaşev

History
- Predecessor: Sagintayev
- Successor: Mamin II

The First Mamin Government (Kazakh: Маминнің бірінші үкіметі, romanized: Maminnıñ bırınşı ükımetı; Russian: Первое правительство Мамина) was 15th composition of the Government of Kazakhstan under the leadership of Prime Minister Askar Mamin. It was formed after the previous government, led by Prime Minister Bakytzhan Sagintayev, was dismissed by President Nursultan Nazarbayev on 21 February 2019 as a result of the discontent in the 2019–20 Kazakh protests. Mamin, under Sagintayev, served as the First Deputy Prime Minister and was appointed as the Acting PM. He was officially confirmed by the Parliament on 25 February 2019, which formed a new cabinet.

== Composition ==
Functions	Holder	Start	End
Prime Minister Премьер-министр	Askar Mamin	25 February 2019	5 January 2022
First Deputy Prime Minister Премьер-министрдің бірінші орынбасары	Alihan Smaiylov	25 February 2019	5 January 2022
Deputy Prime Minister Премьер-Министрдің орынбасары	Gulshara Abdykhalikova	25 February 2019	20 August 2019
Deputy Prime Minister Премьер-Министрдің орынбасары	Zhenis Kassymbek	25 February 2019	18 September 2019
Deputy Prime Minister Премьер-Министрдің орынбасары	Berdibek Saparbayev	20 August 2019	10 February 2020
Deputy Prime Minister Премьер-Министрдің орынбасары	Roman Sklyar	18 September 2019	Present
Deputy Prime Minister Премьер-Министрдің орынбасары	Eraly Togjanov	11 February 2020	31 August 2022
Prime Minister's Office Премьер-Министр Кеңсесінің Басшысы	Nurlan Aldabergenov	27 March 2017	1 March 2019
Prime Minister's Office Премьер-Министр Кеңсесінің Басшысы	Darhan Kaletaev	1 March 2019	25 March 2019
Prime Minister's Office Премьер-Министр Кеңсесінің Басшысы	Galymjan Koishibaev	26 March 2019	Present
Ministry of Foreign Affairs Сыртқы істер министрі	Beibut Atamkulov	26 December 2018	18 September 2019
Ministry of Foreign Affairs Сыртқы істер министрі	Mukhtar Tleuberdi	8 September 2019	29 March 2023
Ministry of Defense Қорғаныс министрі	Nurlan Yermekbayev	7 August 2018	31 August 2021
Ministry of Internal Affairs Ішкі істер министрі	Erlan Turgymbaev	12 February 2019	16 April 2021
Ministry of Information and Social Development Ақпарат және қоғамдық даму министрі	Dauren Abaev	25 February 2019	4 May 2020
Ministry of Information and Social Development Ақпарат және қоғамдық даму министрі	Aida Balaeva	4 May 2020	Present
Ministry of Agriculture Ауыл шаруашылығы министрі	Saparhan Omarov	25 February 2019	10 July 2021
Ministry of Justice Әділет министрі	Marat Beketaev	13 September 2016	5 January 2022
Ministry of Education and Science Білім және ғылым министрі	Kulash Shamshidinova	25 February 2019	13 June 2019
Ministry of Education and Science Білім және ғылым министрі	Ashat Aimagambetov	13 June 2019	11 June 2022
Ministry of Healthcare Денсаулық сақтау министрі	Eljan Birtanov	25 January 2017	25 June 2020
Ministry of Healthcare Денсаулық сақтау министрі	Alexey Tsoi	25 June 2020	20 December 2021
Ministry of Labour and Social Protection of the Population Еңбек және халықты әлеуметтік қорғау министрі	Berdibek Saparbayev	25 February 2019	20 August 2019
Ministry of Labour and Social Protection of the Population Еңбек және халықты әлеуметтік қорғау министрі	Birjan Nurymbetov	20 August 2019	18 January 2021
Ministry of Industry and Infrastructure Development Индустрия және инфрақұрылымдық даму министрі	Roman Sklyar	25 February 2019	18 September 2019
Ministry of Industry and Infrastructure Development Индустрия және инфрақұрылымдық даму министрі	Beibut Atamkulov	18 September 2019	Present
Ministry of Finance Қаржы министрі	Alihan Smaiylov	18 September 2018	18 May 2020
Ministry of Finance Қаржы министрі	Erulan Jamaubaev	18 May 2020	6 February 2024
Ministry of Culture and Sports Мәдениет және спорт министрі	Arystanbek Muhamediuly	6 August 2014	17 June 2019
Ministry of Culture and Sports Мәдениет және спорт министрі	Aqtoty Raiymqulova	17 June 2019	11 January 2022
Ministry of Trade and Integration Сауда және интеграция министрі	Bakhyt Sultanov	17 June 2019	Present
Ministry of Emergency Situations Төтенше жағдайлар министрі	Yuri Ilyin	11 September 2020	10 June 2023
Ministry of National Economy Ұлттық экономика министрі	Ruslan Dälenov	25 February 2019	18 January 2021
Ministry of Digital Development, Innovation and Aerospace Industry Цифрлық даму, инновациялар және аэроғарыш өнеркәсібі министрі	Askar Zhumagaliyev	25 February 2019	20 July 2020
Ministry of Digital Development, Innovation and Aerospace Industry Цифрлық даму, инновациялар және аэроғарыш өнеркәсібі министрі	Bağdat Musin	2 September 2020	30 April 2024
Ministry of Ecology, Geology and Natural Resources Экология, геология және табиғи ресурстар министрі	Magzum Myrzagaliev	17 June 2019	11 January 2022
Ministry of Energy Энергетика министрі	Kanat Bozumbayev	25 March 2016	18 December 2019
Ministry of Energy Энергетика министрі	Nurlan Nogaev	18 December 2019	7 September 2021

Preceded by Sagintayev Cabinet	First Mamin Government; 2019 — 2021	Succeeded by Second Mamin Government
