= Akejan Kajegeldin =

Former Prime Minister of Kazakhstan

- Әкежан Қажыгелдин
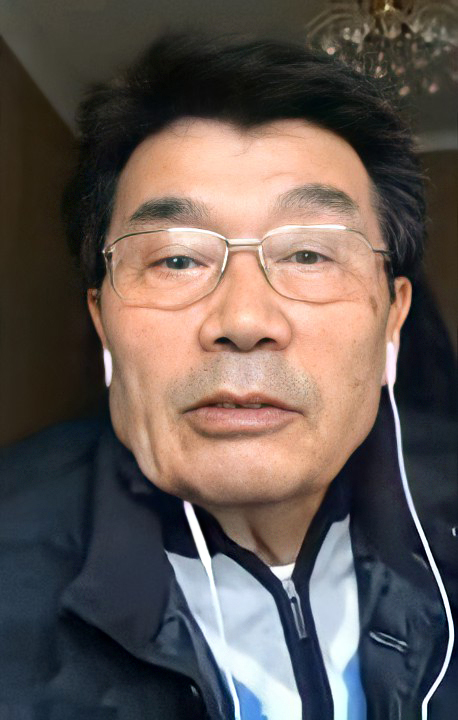
- Kajegeldin in 2022

2nd Prime Minister of Kazakhstan
- In office 14 October 1994 – 10 October 1997
- President: Nursultan Nazarbayev
- First Deputy: Nygmetjan Esengarin (1994–1997); Vitaly Mette (1995–1996); Akhmetzhan Yessimov (1996–1997)
- Preceded by: Sergey Tereshchenko
- Succeeded by: Nurlan Balgimbayev

First Deputy Prime Minister of Kazakhstan
- In office 18 December 1993 – 14 October 1994
- Prime Minister: Sergey Tereshchenko
- Preceded by: Daulet Sembaev
- Succeeded by: Nygmetjan Esengarin

Chairman of the Republican People's Party
- In office 17 December 1998 – 25 December 2001
- Deputy: Amirjan Qosanov
- Preceded by: Office established
- Succeeded by: Office abolished

Personal details
- Born: 27 March 1952 (age 74) Georgiyevka (now Qalbatau), Kazakh SSR, Soviet Union

Military service
- Allegiance: Soviet Union
- Years of service: 1974–1978

Äkejan Mağjanūly Qajygeldin (Note: Often transliterated as Akezhan Magzhanovich Kazhegeldin through a Russified Romanization of Акежан Магжанович Кажегелдин.) (Kazakh: Әкежан Мағжанұлы Қажыгелдин, [ækʲeˈʒɑn mɑɣˈʒɑnʊɫɤ qɑʒɤˈgʲeldin]; born 27 March 1952) is a Kazakh politician who served as the 2nd Prime Minister of Kazakhstan from 12 October 1994 until his resignation on 10 October 1997, ostensibly for health reasons, though many saw it as an act protesting authoritarianism in Kazakhstan. He has accused President Nazarbayev of authoritarianism, nepotism, and indifference to violations of human rights.

Kajegeldin lives in the west in exile. Adam Albion of Radio Free Europe characterized Kajegeldin's efforts at democratizing Kazakhstan as "defiant, confrontational, and openly scornful of the idea" that Nursultan Nazarbayev, the President of Kazakhstan, "will ever share power willingly."

== Biography ==
Kajegeldin was born in Georgievka village of the Semipalatinsk region into a family of teachers. In 1974, he graduated from Semipalatinsk Pedagogical Institute and in 1985 graduated from the Narxoz University.

Digital Freedom Network credits Kajegeldin's premiership with establishing a "stable currency, bank system, and privatization programs that led to growth. He worked at attracting foreign investment, and helped to lay groundwork for a stock market."

In 1998 he was elected President of the Union of Industrialists and Entrepreneurs of Kazakhstan.

The publishing of his book, Kazakhstan: The Right to Choose, led to a political rift with President Nazarbayev. The rift widened when Kajegeldin's 21st Century Freedom Foundation sponsored amendments to the constitution regarding free elections. Kajegeldin has since been barred from participating in presidential elections because of his participation in an unsanctioned demonstration, "an administrative offense."

In April 1998, after he had left the country, the government charged him with tax evasion and illegally buying real estate in Belgium. In December 1998, Kajegeldin founded the Republican People's Party (QRHP) and attempted to challenge Nazarbayev in the 1999 Kazakh presidential election. During the campaign, Kajegeldin, along with his associates were beaten, harassed, and stalked. An assassination attempt was made towards him by a gunfire outside the city of Almaty. Kajegeldin was eventually barred from participating in the elections due to his involvement in an unregistered organization of the Movement for Honest Elections.

Kajegeldin attempted to return to Kazakhstan to attend his father-in-law's funeral and to campaign for the 1999 Kazakh legislative election. At the request of the Prosecutor General of Kazakhstan, he was detained by the Russian police in the Sheremetyevo Airport on 10 September 1999 and was held in custody for 9 hours until Kajegeldin complained of heart pains. He was taken to a Kremlin hospital for treatment and was held there for 4 days until Kajegeldin was transferred to a Barvikha Sanatorium on 15 September. Prosecutor General of Kazakhstan Yurii Khitrin and his officials attempted to visit him but were barred at the request of Kajegeldin. A telephone conversation instead was held between the two parties where Khitrin told Kajegeldin that he could return to Kazakhstan "voluntarily". Later that day, Kajegeldin was freed of charges and was allowed to leave Russia. According to Kajegeldin himself, the reason for his attempted return was due to the fact that the Kazakhstan's Ambassador to United States Bolat Nurgaliyev wrote an article for the Washington Times, stating that Kajegeldin could return to Kazakhstan freely without having fears of being arrested. Kajegeldin himself denied the charges and said they were motivated by politics.

in 2001, the Supreme Court of Kazakhstan sentenced Kajegeldin in absentia to ten years in prison with confiscation of property. The court also recommended the Kazakh president to strip Kajegeldin of the Order of Parasat, which he was awarded in 1997.

== See also ==
- Government of Kazakhstan

== Notes ==
Political offices
Preceded by Sergey Tereshchenko	Prime Minister of Kazakhstan; 1994-1997	Succeeded by Nurlan Balgimbayev
