= Galymjan Koishibaev =

Kazakh politician and diplomat

Ğalymjan Qoişybaev
- Ғалымжан Қойшыбаев
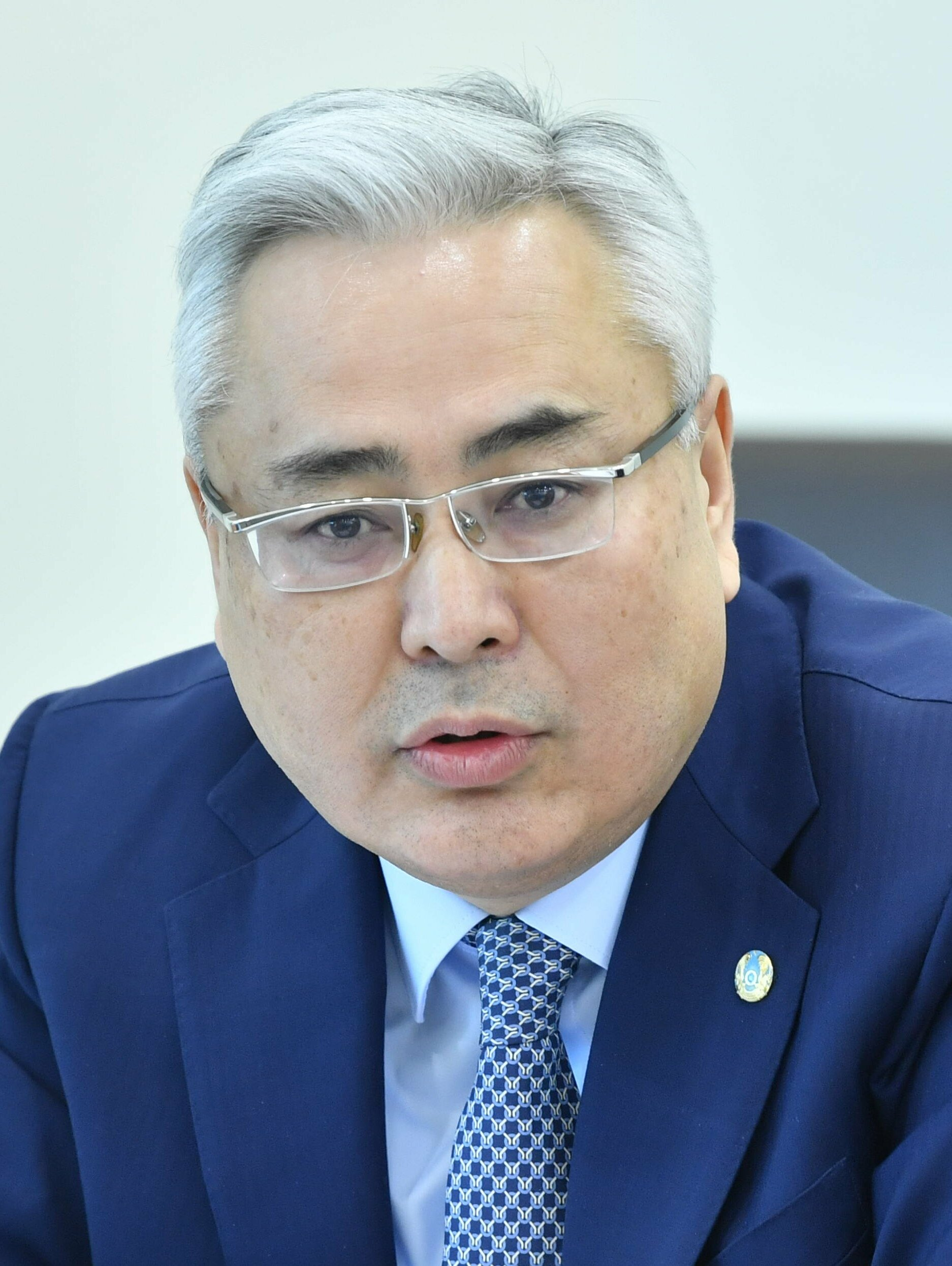
- Koishibaev in 2023

Deputy prime minister of Kazakhstan
- Incumbent
- Assumed office 4 January 2023
- President: Kassym-Jomart Tokayev
- Prime Minister: Älihan Smaiylov; Oljas Bektenov

Head of the Government Apparatus
- Incumbent
- Assumed office 4 January 2023
- President: Kassym-Jomart Tokayev
- Prime Minister: Älihan Smaiylov; Oljas Bektenov
- Preceded by: Office established (himself as head of the prime minister's Office)

Head of the prime minister's Office
- In office 25 March 2019 – 4 January 2023
- President: Kassym-Jomart Tokayev
- Prime Minister: Asqar Mamin; Älihan Smaiylov
- Preceded by: Darhan Kaletaev
- Succeeded by: Office abolished (himself as head of the Government Apparatus)

Kazakh ambassador to Finland and Estonia
- In office 12 February 2009 – 4 March 2016
- President: Nursultan Nazarbayev
- Preceded by: Tileukhan Kabdyrakhmanov
- Succeeded by: Murat Nurtileu

Kazakh ambassador to Lithuania and Latvia
- In office 4 December 2008 – 4 March 2016
- President: Nursultan Nazarbayev
- Preceded by: Tileukhan Kabdyrakhmanov
- Succeeded by: Baurzhan Mukhamejanov

Personal details
- Born: 12 April 1968 (age 58) Kyzylorda, Kazakh SSR, Soviet Union
- Education: Moscow State University
- Awards: Order of Parasat, Order of Kurmet

Galymzhan Telmanovich Koishybayev (Kazakh: Ғалымжан Тельманұлы Қойшыбаев, romanized: Ğalymjan Telmanūly Qoişybaev; born 12 April 1968) is a Kazakh diplomat and politician, who is serving as the Deputy Prime Minister of Kazakhstan and Chief of Staff of the Government since 2023. Previously, he was the Head of the Office of the Prime Minister from 2019 to 2023.

== Early life ==
Koishybayev was born in 1968 in the city of Kyzylorda. He graduated from Moscow State University.

== Career ==
From 1995 to 2004, he served as Attaché, Third Secretary, First Secretary, Counselor, and Minister-Counselor at the Embassy of the Republic of Kazakhstan in the Russian Federation. In 2004, he was the Permanent Representative of the Republic of Kazakhstan to the Collective Security Treaty Organization.

From 2004 to 2006, he was the Chief Inspector of the Administration of the President of Kazakhstan. From 2006 to 2008, he was Ambassador-at-Large at the Ministry of Foreign Affairs.

From 2008 to 2012, he served as the Extraordinary and Plenipotentiary Ambassador of the Republic of Kazakhstan to Lithuania and concurrently to Latvia, Estonia, and Finland. From 2012 to 2016, he was the Extraordinary and Plenipotentiary Ambassador of the Republic of Kazakhstan to the Finland and Estonia.

Since 2016, Koishybayev has served as the Republic of Kazakhstan's Deputy Minister of Foreign Affairs. On 26 March 2019, he was appointed Head of the Office of the Prime Minister by government decree. On 4 January 2023, he began his duties as Deputy Prime Minister of Kazakhstan. On 6 February 2024, by decree of the Head of State, he was appointed Deputy Prime Minister and Head of the Government Apparatus of the Republic of Kazakhstan.

== Awards ==
- Order of Parasat
- Order of Kurmet
