= Vitaly Mette =

Kazakhstani politician and scientist (1947-2003)

- Виталий Метте

First Deputy Prime Minister of Kazakhstan
- In office 13 March 1995 – 14 March 1996 Serving with Nygmetjan Esengarin
- Prime Minister: Akezhan Kazhegeldin
- Preceded by: Nygmetjan Esengarin
- Succeeded by: Nygmetjan Esengarin

Deputy Prime Minister of Kazakhstan
- In office 12 October 1994 – 13 March 1995
- Prime Minister: Akezhan Kazhegeldin

Akim of East Kazakhstan Region
- In office 17 April 1997 – 26 February 2003
- Preceded by: Qajymurat Nagymanov
- Succeeded by: Talgatbek Abaidildin

Akim of Semey Region
- In office 10 March 1997 – 17 April 1997
- Preceded by: Galymzhan Zhakiyanov
- Succeeded by: Office abolished

Personal details
- Born: January 5, 1947 Kozlushka, Kazakh SSR, Soviet Union
- Died: 4 July 2003 (aged 56) Astana, Kazakhstan
- Spouse(s): Evgenia Nikitina; Elena Dezortseva
- Children: 2
- Education: Nakhimov Naval Academy

Vitaly Leonidovich Mette (Russian: Виталий Леонидович Метте; 5 January 1947 – 4 July 2003) was a Kazakh politician and scientist, who served as Deputy Prime Minister of Kazakhstan from October 1994 to March 1995, First Deputy Prime Minister of Kazakhstan from March 1995 to March 1997, akim of the Semey Region from March to April 1997, and akim of East Kazakhstan Region from April 1997 to February 1993. Mette was also a faculty member of the International Academy of Mineral Resources and the Academy of Mineral Resources of the Republic of Kazakhstan, and the president of the Board of Directors of JSC National Company Kazakhstan Engineering.

== Early life and education ==
Mette was born in 1947 in the village of Kozlushka of the East Kazakhstan Region. His father was a mechanic and his grandfather immigrated from France to Russia in 1900. In 1970, he graduated from the Nakhimov Naval Academy in Sevastopol where he earned a diploma in mechanical engineering.

== Career ==
From June 1970, he was the commander of a group of military unit No. 31217-2 of the Pacific Fleet, operator of a nuclear reactor on a submarine, Petropavlovsk-Kamchatsky-2. In July 1974, Mette became the assistant at the Department of Descriptive Geometry of the Ust-Kamenogorsk Road Construction Institute. From November 1974, he was an instrumentalist, shift foreman, senior process engineer of workshop No. 8, head of workshop No. 10, and the director of the Ulba Metallurgical Plant of the East Kazakhstan Region.

In January 1989, Mette became the director of the production association Ulba Metallurgical Plant in Oskemen and from August 1990, he served as a general director of the Ulba Metallurgical Plant Production Association.

From March 1994, Mette was a member of the East Kazakhstan Maslihat from the Central District No. 4 of Oskemen where he from April served as a chairman of the Permanent Commission of the Regional Maslihat on Budget and Economic Reform.

In September 1994, Mette became the president of the Ulba State Holding Company.

On 12 October 1994, he was appointed as the Deputy Prime Minister of Kazakhstan and the same time from December 1994, Mette was the deputy chairman of the Supreme Advisory Council for Science and Technology of the Republic of Kazakhstan. On 13 March 1995, he became the First Deputy Prime Minister of Kazakhstan and while serving that position, he was the president of the Union of Industrialists and Entrepreneurs of Kazakhstan.

On 14 March 1996, Mette became the Vice President of Ivedon International Ltd and served that position until he was appointed as the akim of Semey Region on 10 March 1997. On 17 April 1997, Mette became the akim of East Kazakhstan Region until he was replaced by Abaidildin Talgatbek on 26 February 2003.

A month later on 13 March 2003, Mette was appointed as the president of domestic military industrial holding Kazakhstan Engineering until his death.

== Death and legacy ==
On the night of 3–4 July 2003, Mette unexpectedly died from a serious illness. He was buried in Oskemen. Mette is survived by his two daughters and one grandson.

In March 2004, a memorial plaque was installed in the building of the uranium production at the Ulba Metallurgical Plant, where Mette worked for 20 years.
