= Nygmetjan Esengarin =

Kazakh politician (born 1941)

- Нығметжан Есенғарин

First Deputy Prime Minister of Kazakhstan
- In office 12 October 1994 – 24 July 1997 Serving with Vitaly Mette, Akhmetzhan Yessimov
- Prime Minister: Akezhan Kazhegeldin
- Preceded by: Akezhan Kazhegeldin; Vitaly Mette
- Succeeded by: Akhmetzhan Yessimov

Minister of Transport and Communications
- In office 13 June 1994 – 11 October 1994
- President: Nursultan Nazarbayev
- Prime Minister: Sergey Tereshchenko
- Preceded by: Office established
- Succeeded by: Serik Aligujinov

Minister of Transport
- In office 25 February 1991 – 13 June 1994
- President: Nursultan Nazarbayev
- Prime Minister: Sergey Tereshchenko
- Preceded by: Office established
- Succeeded by: Himself (as Minister of Transport and Communications)

Personal details
- Born: September 21, 1941 (age 85) Burino, Kunashaksky District, Chelyabinsk Oblast, Russian SFSR, Soviet Union
- Spouse: Rauşan Esenğarina
- Children: 2
- Education: Ural State University of Railway Transport; Russian Presidential Academy of National Economy and Public Administration

Military service
- Allegiance: Soviet Union
- Branch/service: Soviet Army
- Years of service: 1964–1966

Nyğmetjan Qabataiūly Esenğarin (Note: Often transliterated as Nygmetzhan Kabatayevich Issingarin through a Russified Romanization of Ныгметжан Кабатаевич Исингарин.) (Kazakh: Нығметжан Қабатайұлы Есенғарин; born 21 September 1941) is a Kazakh politician.

== Biography ==
=== Early life and education ===
Esengarin was born in the village of Burino in the Chelyabinsk Oblast of the Russian SFSR to the parents of Qabatai Esengarin (1908–1952) and Elikha Esengarina (1910–1981).

In 1958, Esengarin graduated from high school in the village of Semiozernoye and then in 1964, from the Ural State University of Railway Transport with a degree in Automation, Telemechanics and Communication in Railway Transport.

In 1984, he finished the Russian Presidential Academy of National Economy and Public Administration with a specialty in economics, organization of management and planning of the national economy.

=== Career ===
After graduating in 1964, Esengarin served in the tank forces in Samarkand.

From 1966, Esengarin worked as an electromechanic, engineer, chief engineer, head of the Department of the Tselinograd Signaling and Communication Distance, head of the Department of the Tselinograd Branch of the Road and from 1972, as the head of the Technical Department, deputy chief engineer of the Kazakh Railway, chief engineer of the Tselinnaya Railway. From 1986 to 1989, Esengarin was the head of the Tselinnaya railway, deputy minister for construction of the Minister of Railways of the USSR. In 1989, he became the head of the Alma-Ata railway.

On 25 February 1991, Esengarin was appointed as the Minister of Transport and on 12 October 1994, he became the First Deputy Prime Minister of Kazakhstan. While serving as the First Deputy, he became a member of Presidium of the Economic Union and the Interstate Economic Committee of the CIS in November 1994 and from 1996, the chairman of the Integration Committee of the CIS Customs Union, Deputy Secretary General of the Eurasian Economic Community.

From 2002 to 2013, Esengarin was the founder and general director of the independent research and implementation center "Economtransconsulting" LLP, director of the "Center for Management and Logistics in Transport" and from 2006 to 2014, member of the Board of Directors of Kazakhstan Temir Joly.

He's currently serving as the member of Eurasia International Economic Academy and the International Academy of Transport, chairman of the Association of National Freight Forwarders of Kazakhstan, the Kazakhstan Association of Carriers and Operators of Wagons, chairman of the Board of Directors of the ETC Trans Group consortium, scientific advisor to Esengarin and Partners LLP and an advisor to the President of Kazakhstan Temir Zholy.

=== Works ===
Esengarin is a publisher of the analytical industry magazine "Trans-Express Kazakhstan, the magazine for passengers of the Kazakh railways "Time on the road", the general transport business magazine "Trans-Logistics Kazakhstan".
