= Yurii Khitrin =

Yurii Khitrin served as the Prosecutor General of Kazakhstan. He attained this position in 1997. In this role he was public in his view that the privatisation of state assets in Kazakhstan had involved a great deal of corruption. In 2000, he was appointed Chairman of the Constitutional Council.

== See also ==
- Government of Kazakhstan
