= Baltash Tursymbaev =

Kazakh diplomat and politician (1946–2022)

- Балташ Тұрсымбаев
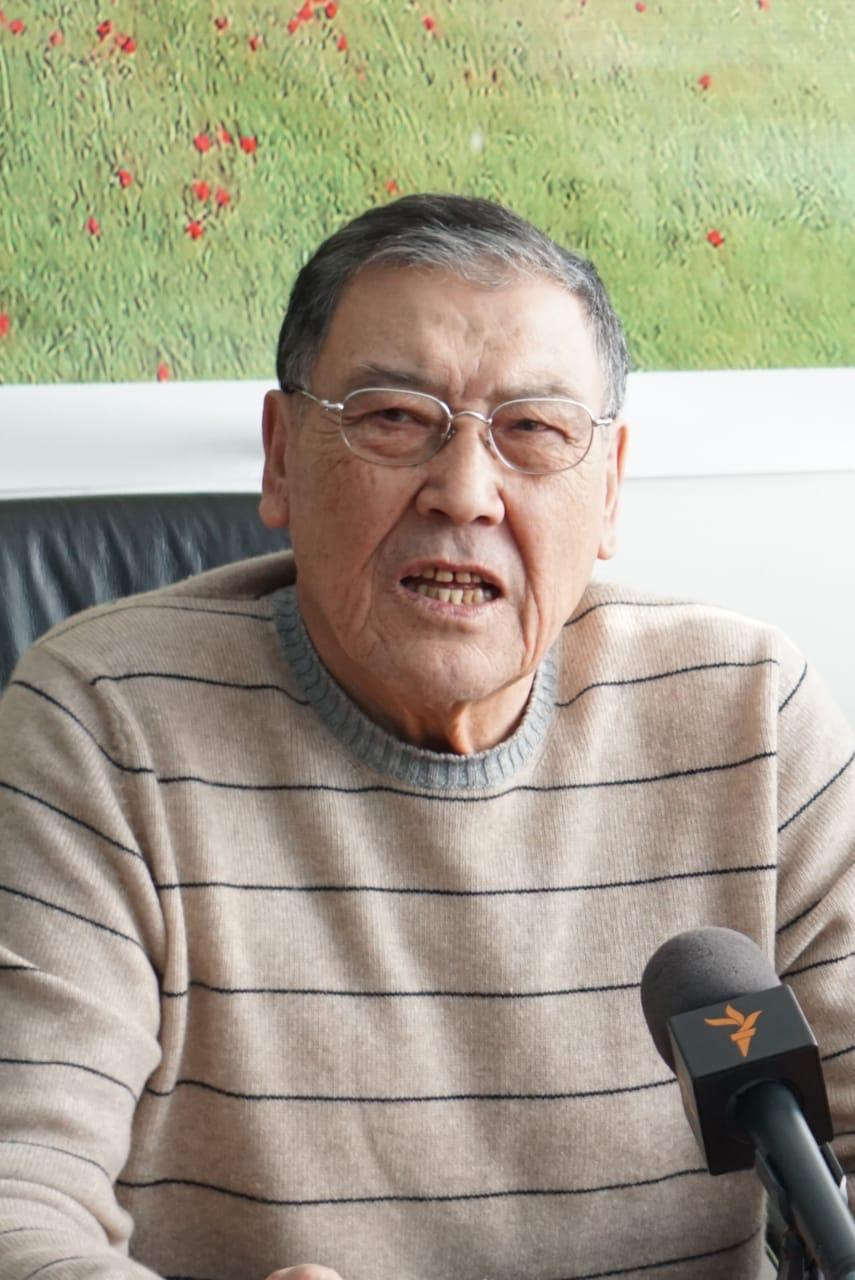

Minister of Agriculture
- In office 7 February 1992 – 18 November 1993
- Preceded by: Valentin Dvurechensky
- Succeeded by: Sergey Kulagin

Personal details
- Born: Baltash Moldabayuly Tursymbaev; 24 October 1946; Sherbakulsky District, Omsk Oblast, Russian SFSR, USSR
- Died: 14 August 2022 (aged 75); Almata, Kazakhstan
- Political party: CPSU (until 1991)
- Education: Omsk State Agrarian University
- Occupation: Diplomat

Baltash Moldabayuly Tursymbaev (Kazakh: Балташ Молдабайұлы Тұрсымбаев, Baltaş Moldabaiūly Tūrsymbaev; 24 October 1946 – 14 August 2022) was a Kazakh diplomat and politician. He served as Minister of Agriculture from 1992 to 1993.

Tursymbaev died in Almata on 14 August 2022, at the age of 75.
