= Marat Beketaev =

Kazakh politician

- Марат Бекетаев
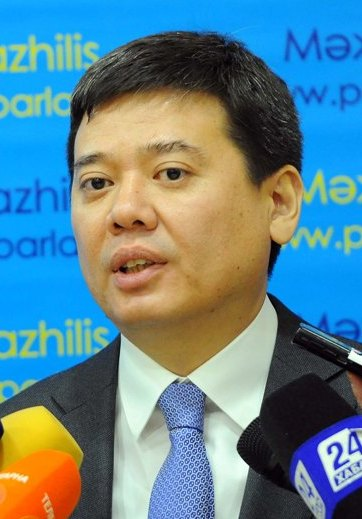
- Beketaev in 2018

Minister of Justice
- In office 13 September 2016 – 5 January 2022
- President: Nursultan Nazarbayev; Kassym-Jomart Tokayev
- Prime Minister: Bakhytzhan Sagintayev; Askar Mamin
- Preceded by: Berik Imashev
- Succeeded by: Yerlan Turgumbayev

Personal details
- Born: 29 August 1977 (age 49) Chimkent, Kazakh SSR, Soviet Union
- Spouse: Gülnara Beketaeva
- Children: 2
- Education: KAZGUU University; London School of Economics

Marat Baqytjanūly Beketaev (Kazakh: Марат Бақытжанұлы Бекетаев; born 29 August 1977) is a Kazakh politician, who served as the Minister of Justice from 2016 to 2022. Prior to that, he was the deputy head of the Presidential Administration of Kazakhstan from 2015 to 2016.

== Biography ==
Born in Chimkent (now Shymkent), Beketaev graduated from the Kazakh State Law University in 1998. In 2000, he received a Master of Laws degree in International Business Law from the London School of Economics.

From 2001 to 2002, he served as the head of the sector in the department for work with diplomatic missions. In 2003, Beketaev became the head of the department for servicing the diplomatic corps.

From 2003 to 2004, he held the position of head of department, head of department and advisor to the chairman. In 2004, Beketaev became the deputy director of the information and testing center. From 2004, he held the positions of deputy director and Director of the Eurasian Center for Training Civil Servants.

In 2006, Beketaev became an advisor to the Deputy Prime Minister of Kazakhstan. From 2007, he was an advisor to the Prime Minister. From 2007 to 2010, he served as a Deputy Minister of Justice. In 2010, Beketaev became the executive secretary of the Ministry of Justice.

On 11 December 2015, he was appointed as the Deputy Head of the Presidential Administration of Kazakhstan. Beketaev held the post of Minister of Justice in the cabinet of Bakytzhan Sagintayev and Askar Mamin from 13 September 2016 until the dismissal of the Mamin Cabinet on 5 January 2022.

Since January 2022, he has become an adviser to the Prime Minister of the Republic of Kazakhstan.

On October 21, 2023, he was detained in a corruption case.
