= Deputy Prime Minister of Kazakhstan =

Governmental post in Kazakhstan

The Deputy Prime Minister of Kazakhstan (Kazakh: Премьер-Министрдің орынбасары, romanized: Premer-Ministrdıñ orynbasary) is a cabinet member in the Government of Kazakhstan. The post is usually led by multiple people who carry out their activities in accordance with the policies established by the Prime Minister of Kazakhstan and are appointed by the President of Kazakhstan who are approved by the Parliament of Kazakhstan.

== List of deputy PM ==
| Deputy PM | Term of office | | Other offices held while deputy | Prime minister |
|---|---|---|---|---|
| Kadyr Baikenov | 25 June 1991 | 18 January 1993 | none | Uzakbay Karamanov |
| Myrzatai Joldasbekov | 25 June 1991 | 18 January 1993 | none | Uzakbay Karamanov |
| Baltash Tursymbaev | 25 June 1991 | 18 January 1993 | Minister of Agriculture | Uzakbay Karamanov |
| Karatai Turysov | 25 June 1991 | 31 August 1991 | none | Uzakbay Karamanov |
| Daulet Sembaev | 16 October 1991 | 6 February 1992 | none | Sergey Tereshchenko |
| Asygat Jabagin | 18 January 1993 | 1 September 1994 | none | Sergey Tereshchenko |
| Galym Abilsiitov | 18 January 1993 | 11 October 1994 | Minister of Science and New Technologies (from 1992 to 1994) | Sergey Tereshchenko |
| Quanysh Sultanov | 18 January 1993 | 18 March 1994 | none | Sergey Tereshchenko |
| Janibek Karibjanov | 18 January 1993 | 13 June 1994 | Chairman of the State Committee on State Property | Sergey Tereshchenko |
| Syzdyq Abishev | 22 June 1993 | 13 June 1994 | Minister of Foreign Economic Relations (from 1990 to 1994) | Sergey Tereshchenko |
| Sergey Kulagin | 22 June 1993 | 11 October 1994 | Minister of Agriculture (from 1993 to June 1994) | Sergey Tereshchenko |
| Tolegen Jukeev | 18 March 1994 | 14 October 1994 | none | Sergey Tereshchenko |
| Akhmetzhan Yessimov | 12 October 1994 | 4 March 1996 | none | Akezhan Kazhegeldin |
| Vitaly Mette | 12 October 1994 | 13 March 1995 | none | Akezhan Kazhegeldin |
| Viktor Sobolev | 12 October 1994 | 14 September 1996 | none | Akezhan Kazhegeldin |
| Imangali Tasmagambetov | 13 March 1995 | 10 October 1997 | Minister of Education and Culture (from 17 March 1997 to 10 October 1997)) | Akezhan Kazhegeldin |
| Nagashybai Shaikenov | 3 July 1995 | 4 November 1996 | Minister of Justice (from June 1993 to October 1995) | Akezhan Kazhegeldin |
| Nikolai Makievsky | 10 January 1996 | 15 November 1996 | Chairman of the State Committee on Emergency Situations (from 1995 to 1997) | Akezhan Kazhegeldin |
| Janibek Karibjanov | 4 March 1996 | 2 July 1997 | none | Akezhan Kazhegeldin |
| Garry Shtoik | 8 May 1996 | 28 October 1996 | Minister of Industry and Trade (from 1994 to 28 October 1996) | Akezhan Kazhegeldin |
| Aleksandr Pavlov | 14 September 1996 | 3 October 1999 | Minister of Finance (from 12 October 1994 to 21 February 1998) | Akezhan Kazhegeldin |
| Dyusembai Duisenov | 28 October 1996 | 16 June 1997 | none | Akezhan Kazhegeldin |
| Umirzak Shukeyev | 13 July 1997 | 10 October 1997 | Minister of Economy and Trade (from March 1997 to 10 October 1997) | Akezhan Kazhegeldin |
| Baltash Tursymbaev | 25 October 1998 | 2 November 1998 | none | Nurlan Balgimbayev |
| Oraz Jandosov | 22 January 1999 | 1 October 1999 | Minister of Finance | Nurlan Balgimbayev |
| Kassym-Jomart Tokayev | 15 March 1999 | 1 October 1999 | Ministry of Foreign Affairs (from 12 October 1994 to 12 October 1999) | Nurlan Balgimbayev |
| Erik Otembaev | 12 October 1999 | 20 December 2000 | none | Kassym-Jomart Tokayev |
| Daniyal Akhmetov | 12 October 1999 | 21 December 2000 | none | Kassym-Jomart Tokayev |
| Oraz Jandosov | 20 December 2000 | 21 November 2001 | none | Kassym-Jomart Tokayev |
| Imangali Tasmagambetov | 17 December 2000 | 29 January 2002 | none | Kassym-Jomart Tokayev |
| Vladimir Shkolnik | 13 December 2000 | 29 January 2002 | Minister of Energy and Mineral Resources (from 13 December 2000 to 19 January 2006) | Kassym-Jomart Tokayev |
| Karim Massimov | 27 November 2001 | 13 June 2003 | none | Kassym-Jomart Tokayev |
| Aleksandr Pavlov | 29 January 2002 | 28 August 2002 | Finance minister | Imangali Tasmagambetov |
| Bauyrzhan Mukhamedzhanov | 29 January 2002 | 13 June 2003 | none | Imangali Tasmagambetov |
| Akhmetzhan Yessimov | 28 May 2002 | 19 January 2006 | Minister of Agriculture (from 18 May 2001 to 14 May 2004) | Imangali Tasmagambetov |
| Sauat Mynbayev | 13 June 2003 | 31 January 2006 | Minister of Industry and Trade (from 14 December 2004 to 31 January 2006) | Daniyal Akhmetov |
| Byrganym Aitimova | 15 May 2004 | 13 December 2005 | none | Daniyal Akhmetov |
| Karim Massimov | 18 January 2006 | 10 January 2007 | Minister of Economy and Budget Planning (from 19 April 2006 to 4 October 2006) | Daniyal Akhmetov |
| Aslan Musin | 10 January 2007 | 27 August 2007 | Minister of Economy and Budget Planning (from 4 October 2006 to 10 August 2007) | Karim Massimov |
| Umirzak Shukeyev | 27 August 2007 | 3 March 2009 | none | Karim Massimov |
| Yerbol Orynbayev | 29 October 2007 | 6 October 2008 | none | Karim Massimov |
| Serik Akhmetov | 3 March 2009 | 19 November 2009 | none | Karim Massimov |
| Asset Issekeshev | 12 March 2010 | 6 August 2014 | Minister of Industry and New Technologies | Karim Massimov |
| Yerbol Orynbayev | 11 April 2011 | 28 November 2013 | none | Karim Massimov |
| Kairat Kelimbetov | 20 January 2012 | 1 October 2013 | none | Karim Massimov |
| Krymbek Kusherbayev | 20 January 2012 | 17 January 2013 | none | Karim Massimov |
| Bakhytjan Sagintayev | 16 January 2013 | 6 November 2013 | Minister of Regional Development | Serik Akhmetov |
| Bakhyt Sultanov | 6 November 2013 | 11 November 2018 | Finance minister (from 6 November 2013 to 11 September 2018) | Serik Akhmetov |
| Gulshara Abdykhalikova | 28 November 2013 | 11 November 2014 | none | Serik Akhmetov |
| Berdibek Saparbayev | 11 November 2014 | 11 September 2015 | none | Karim Massimov |
| Dariga Nazarbayeva | 11 September 2015 | 13 September 2016 | none | Karim Massimov |
| Askar Myrzakhmetov | 14 June 2016 | 15 December 2017 | Minister of Agriculture (from 6 May 2016 to 15 December 2017) | Karim Massimov |
| Imangali Tasmagambetov | 13 September 2016 | 3 February 2017 | none | Bakhytzhan Sagintayev |
| Askar Zhumagaliyev | 29 August 2017 | 25 February 2019 | Minister of Defense and Aerospace Industry (from 26 December 2018 to 25 February 2019) | Bakhytzhan Sagintayev |
| Erbolat Dosaev | 29 August 2017 | 25 February 2019 | none | Bakhytzhan Sagintayev |
| Gulshara Abdykhalikova | 25 February 2019 | 20 August 2019 | none | Askar Mamin |
| Jenis Qasymbek | 25 February 2019 | 18 September 2019 | none | Askar Mamin |
| Berdibek Saparbayev | 20 August 2019 | 10 February 2020 | none | Askar Mamin |
| Roman Sklyar | 18 September 2019 | 5 January 2022 | none | Askar Mamin |
| Eraly Togjanov | 11 February 2020 | 31 August 2022 | none | Askar Mamin |
| Mukhtar Tleuberdi | 18 January 2021 | 29 March 2023 | Minister of Foreign Affairs (from 18 September 2019 to 29 March 2023) | Askar Mamin |
| Bakhyt Sultanov | 11 January 2022 | 15 August 2022 | Minister of Trade and Integration (from 17 June 2019 to 15 August 2022) | Alihan Smaiylov |
| Erulan Jamaubaev | 29 March 2022 | 6 February 2024 | Finance minister (from 18 May 2020 to 6 February 2024) | Alihan Smaiylov |
| Serik Jumanğarin | 15 August 2022 | Incumbent | Minister of Trade and Integration (from 15 August 2022 to 2 September 2023); Minister of National Economy (since 21 December 2024) | Alihan Smaiylov |
| Altai Kölgınov | 9 December 2022 | 8 June 2023 | none | Alihan Smaiylov |
| Ğalymjan Qoişybaev | 4 January 2023 | Incumbent | Head of the Government Apparatus (since 25 March 2019) | Alihan Smaiylov |
| Murat Nurtileu | 3 April 2023 | 26 September 2025 | Minister of Foreign Affairs | Alihan Smaiylov |
| Tamara Duisenova | 8 June 2023 | 14 February 2025 | Minister of Labour and Social Protection of the Population (from 4 April 2023 to 2 September 2023) | Alihan Smaiylov |
| Nurlan Baibazarov | 6 February 2024 | 21 December 2024 | Minister of National Economy | Oljas Bektenov |
| Qanat Bozymbaev | 31 March 2024 | Incumbent | none | Oljas Bektenov |
| Ermek Köşerbaev | 14 February 2025 | 26 September 2025 | none | Oljas Bektenov |
| Jaslan Mädiev | 29 September 2025 | Incumbent | Minister of Artificial Intelligence and Digital Development | Oljas Bektenov |
| Aida Balaeva | 1 December 2025 | 3 September 2026 | Minister of Culture and Information (since 2 September 2023 to 3 September 2026) | Oljas Bektenov |
| Assel Janassova | 3 November 2026 | Incumbent | Minister of Transport | Oljas Bektenov |

== List of first deputy PM ==
| No. | First Deputy PM | Term of Office | | Prime Minister |
|---|---|---|---|---|
| 1 | Yevgeny Ezhikov-Babakhanov (1942–2023) | 16 December 1991 | 6 February 1992 | Sergey Tereshchenko |
| 2 | Daulet Sembaev (1935–2021) | 6 February 1992 | 17 December 1993 | Sergey Tereshchenko |
| 3 | Oleg Soskovets (born 1949) | 6 February 1992 | 5 November 1992 | Sergey Tereshchenko |
| 4 | Akezhan Kazhegeldin (born 1952) | 18 December 1993 | 12 October 1994 | Sergey Tereshchenko |
| 5 | Nygmetjan Esengarin (born 1941) | 12 October 1994 | 24 July 1997 | Akezhan Kazhegeldin |
| 6 | Vitaly Mette (1947–2003) | 13 March 1995 | 14 March 1996 | Akezhan Kazhegeldin |
| 7 | Akhmetzhan Yessimov (born 1950) | 24 October 1996 | 20 February 1998 | Nurlan Balgimbayev |
| 8 | Oraz Jandosov (born 1961) | 20 February 1998 | 22 January 1999 | Nurlan Balgimbayev |
| Vacant (Jan. 1999–Oct. 1999) | | | | Nurlan Balgimbayev |
| 10 | Aleksandr Pavlov (born 1953) | 12 October 1999 | 23 November 2000 | Nurlan Balgimbayev |
| 10 | Aleksandr Pavlov (born 1953) | 12 October 1999 | 23 November 2000 | Kassym-Jomart Tokayev |
| 11 | Daniyal Akhmetov (born 1954) | 21 December 2000 | 21 November 2001 | Kassym-Jomart Tokayev |
| 12 | Aleksandr Pavlov (born 1953) | 28 August 2002 | 6 January 2004 | Imangali Tasmangambetov |
| 12 | Aleksandr Pavlov (born 1953) | 28 August 2002 | 6 January 2004 | Daniyal Akhmetov |
| 13 | Grigori Marchenko (born 1959) | 6 January 2004 | 14 April 2004 | Daniyal Akhmetov |
| | Vacant (2004–2009) | | | Daniyal Akhmetov |
| | Vacant (2004–2009) | | | Karim Massimov |
| 14 | Umirzak Shukeyev (born 1964) | 3 March 2009 | 27 December 2011 | Karim Massimov |
| 15 | Serik Akhmetov (born 1962) | 20 January 2012 | 24 September 2012 | Karim Massimov |
| 16 | Krymbek Kusherbayev (born 1955) | 26 September 2012 | 16 January 2013 | Serik Akhmetov |
| 17 | Bakhytzhan Sagintayev (born 1963) | 16 January 2013 | 8 September 2016 | Serik Akhmetov |
| 17 | Bakhytzhan Sagintayev (born 1963) | 16 January 2013 | 8 September 2016 | Karim Massimov |
| 18 | Askar Mamin (born 1965) | 8 September 2016 | 21 February 2019 | Bakhytzhan Sagintayev |
| 19 | Alihan Smaiylov (born 1972) | 25 February 2019 | 5 January 2021 | Asqar Mamin |
| 20 | Roman Sklyar (born 1971) | 11 January 2022 | 5 May 2026 | Älihan Smaiylov |
| 20 | Roman Sklyar (born 1971) | 11 January 2022 | 5 May 2026 | Oljas Bektenov |
| 21 | Nurlybek Nalibaev (born 1976) | 6 May 2026 | Incumbent | Oljas Bektenov |
