= Rashid Tusupbekov =

Kazakh politician

Rashid Tusipbekov
- Рашид Түсіпбеков

9th President of the Financial Police
- Incumbent
- Assumed office 20 January 2012
- Preceded by: Kairat Kozhamzharov
- Prime Minister: Karim Massimov

Minister of Justice
- In office 2 April 2009 – January 20, 2012
- Prime Minister: Karim Massimov
- Preceded by: Zagipa Baliyeva
- Succeeded by: Berik Imashev

5th Attorney General of Kazakhstan
- In office 21 December 2000 – 2 April 2009
- Prime Minister: Danial Akhmetov; Karim Massimov
- Preceded by: Yuri Kithrin
- Succeeded by: Kairat Mami

Personal details
- Born: January 28, 1955 (age 71) Shymkent, Soviet Union
- Education: Moscow State University

Rashid Toleutaiuly Tusupbekov (Kazakh: Рашид Төлеутайұлы Түсіпбеков; Raşid Töleutaiūly Tüsıpbekov) is a Kazakh politician who was the Prosecutor General of Kazakhstan.

== See also ==
- Government of Kazakhstan
