= Aleksandr Pavlov (politician) =

Kazakh politician and banker (born 1953)

- Александр Павлов

First Deputy Prime Minister of Kazakhstan
- In office 28 August 2002 – 6 January 2004
- Prime Minister: Imangali Tasmagambetov (2002–2003); Daniyal Akhmetov (2003–2004)
- Preceded by: Daniyal Akhmetov
- Succeeded by: Grigori Marchenko
- In office 12 October 1999 – 23 November 2000
- Prime Minister: Kassym-Jomart Tokayev
- Preceded by: Oraz Jandosov
- Succeeded by: Daniyal Akhmetov

Deputy Prime Minister of Kazakhstan
- In office 29 January 2002 – 27 August 2002
- Prime Minister: Imangali Tasmagambetov

Minister of Finance
- In office 29 January 2002 – 27 August 2002
- President: Nursultan Nazarbayev
- Prime Minister: Imangali Tasmagambetov
- Preceded by: Majit Esenbaev
- Succeeded by: Erbolat Dosaev
- In office 12 October 1994 – 21 February 1998
- Prime Minister: Nurlan Balgimbayev
- Preceded by: Erkeshbay Derbisov
- Succeeded by: Sauat Mynbayev

Personal details
- Born: 1 January 1953 (age 73) Pavlodar, Pavlodar Region, Kazakh SSR, Soviet Union
- Party: Nur Otan
- Education: Kuibyshev Belarusian Institute of National Economy; Academy of Sciences of the Soviet Union

Aleksandr Sergeyevich Pavlov (Russian: Александр Сергеевич Павлов; born 1 January 1953) is a Russian-Kazakh politician, economist, financier, and banker. He served as First Deputy Prime Minister of Kazakhstan from October 1999 to November 2000 and August 2002 to January 2004, Minister of Finance from October 1994 to February 1998 and from January to August 2002 while serving as Deputy Prime Minister.

== Biography ==
=== Early life and education ===
Born in the city of Pavlodar, Pavlov graduated from the Faculty of Finance and Economics of the Kuibyshev Belarusian Institute of National Economy, then, in 1991, from the Academy of Social Sciences under the Central Committee of the CPSU.

=== Career ===
From 1974 to 1975, Pavlov worked as a senior economist in the Department of Financing and Agricultural Control of the Financial Department in the Pavlodar Regional Executive Committee.

From 1975 to 1976, he served as an officer in the Soviet Army.

From 1976 to 1987, Pavlov was the Deputy Head of the Finance Department, Head of the Planning and Economic Department of Lenin Pavlodar Tractor Plant.

In 1987, he became the head of the Financial Department of the Pavlodar Regional Executive Committee.

From 1991 to 1992, he was a Deputy Chairman of the Pavlodar Regional Executive Committee.

In 1992, Pavlov became the Deputy Head of the Pavlodar Regional Administration From March to October 1994, he was the Head of the Main Tax Inspectorate and the First Deputy Minister of Finance.

In October 1994, Pavlov became the Minister of Finance and in September 1996, the Deputy Prime Minister at the same time until 1999. In May 1998, he submitted his letter of resignation to Nazarbayev. He was accused by several media of lobbying the interests of private firms. The resignation was declined.

On 12 October 1999, Pavlov was appointed as the First Deputy Prime Minister, to which he served the position until November 2000.

From September 2001, he was the member of the Council of Entrepreneurs under the President of Kazakhstan. From 2001 to 2002, Pavlov was the Deputy Chairman of the Board of Directors and the Management Board of Kazakhmys Corporation.

In 29 January 2002, Pavlov became the Deputy Prime Minister again while at the same time serving as the Minister of Finance. In 28 August 2002, he was reappointed as the First Deputy Prime Minister and served in the position until 6 January 2004.

From 12 March 2004, he was one of the three deputy chairmen of the Nur Otan party along with Amangeldy Ermegiaev and Zharmakhan Tuyakbay, and became sole deputy chairman on 4 July 2007 until 2009.

Since 25 March 2004, he's currently the Chairman of the Board of Directors of Halyk Savings Bank of Kazakhstan JSC. From 22 October 2005, Pavlov was an independent member of the Board of Directors of Kazakhstan Holding for Asset Management Samruk JSC. Since September 2007, Pavlov is a Member of the Council of National Investors under the President of Kazakhstan.
