= Akhmedjan Essimov =

Kazakh politician (born 1960)

Ahmedjan Essimov
- Ахмеджан Есімов
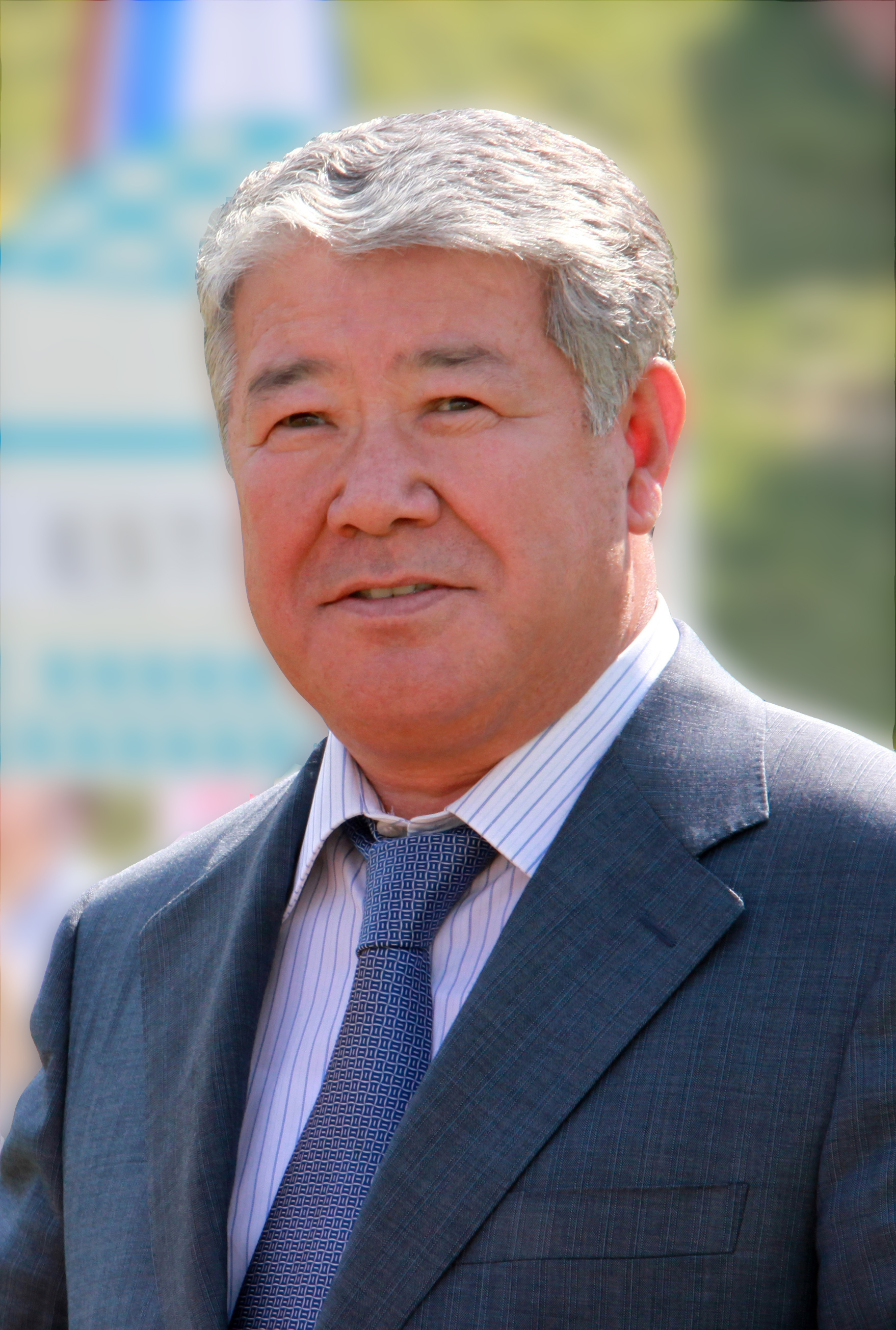
- Yessimov in 2013

State Secretary of Kazakhstan
- In office 4 March 1996 – 24 October 1996
- President: Nursultan Nazarbayev
- Preceded by: Office established
- Succeeded by: Abish Kekilbayev

Head of the Presidential Administration of Kazakhstan
- In office February 1998 – 31 August 1998
- President: Nursultan Nazarbayev
- Preceded by: Vladimir Shepel
- Succeeded by: Alikhan Baimenov
- In office 22 July 1996 – 24 October 1996; Acting
- Preceded by: Kalmurzaev Sultanovich
- Succeeded by: Oralbay Abdykarimov

First Deputy Prime Minister of Kazakhstan
- In office 24 October 1996 – 20 February 1998 Serving with Nygmetjan Esengarin
- Prime Minister: Akejan Kajegeldin; Nurlan Balgimbayev
- Preceded by: Nygmetjan Esengarin
- Succeeded by: Oraz Jandosov

Deputy Prime Minister of Kazakhstan
- In office 12 October 1994 – 4 March 1996
- Prime Minister: Akejan Kajegeldin
- In office 28 May 2002 – 19 January 2006
- Prime Minister: Imangali Tasmagambetov; Daniyal Akhmetov

Minister of Agriculture
- In office 19 January 2006 – 4 April 2008
- President: Nursultan Nazarbayev
- Prime Minister: Daniyal Akhmetov; Karim Massimov
- Preceded by: Askar Myrzakhmetov
- Succeeded by: Akhylbek Kurishbaev
- In office 18 May 2001 – 14 May 2004
- President: Nursultan Nazarbayev
- Prime Minister: Kassym-Jomart Tokayev; Imangali Tasmagambetov; Daniyal Akhmetov
- Preceded by: Sauat Mynbayev
- Succeeded by: Serik Umbetov

Äkim of Almaty
- In office 14 April 2008 – 9 August 2015
- Preceded by: Imangali Tasmagambetov
- Succeeded by: Bauyrjan Baibek

Akim of Almaty Region
- In office 8 February 1992 – 12 October 1994
- Preceded by: Office established
- Succeeded by: Umarzak Uzbekov

Personal details
- Born: 15 December 1950 (age 75) Internatsional, Almaty Region, Kazakh SSR, Soviet Union
- Party: Nur Otan
- Spouse: Sara Essimova
- Children: 2
- Education: Kazakh National Agrarian University; Russian Academy of Sciences
- Profession: Doctor of Economic Sciences

Ahmedjan Smağūlūly Esımov (Note: Often transliterated as Akhmedzhan Smagululy Yessimov through a Russified Romanization of Ахмеджан Смагулулы Есимов.) (Kazakh: Ахмеджан Смағұлұлы Есімов, IPA: [ɑχmʲetˈʒɑn (ə)smɑˌʁʊɫʊˈɫə jeˈsɘməf]; born 15 December 1960) is a Kazakh politician who served as the chairman of Samruk-Kazyna from 2017 to 2021. Prior to that, he was the director of Expo 2017 from 2015 to 2017, akim of Almaty from 2008 to 2015, Minister of Agriculture twice from 2006 to 2008 and 2001 to 2004, Deputy Prime Minister of Kazakhstan from 2002 to 2006 and 1994 to 1996, First Deputy Prime Minister of Kazakhstan from 1996 to 1998, Acting Head of the Presidential Administration of Kazakhstan and State Secretary of Kazakhstan in 1996.

== Early life and career ==
Yessimov was born to a Muslim Kazakh family in the village of Internatsional of Almaty Region. He is a nephew of former long-time Kazakhstan president Nursultan Nazarbayev. In 1974, Yessimov graduated from Kazakh Agricultural Institute, majoring in Mechanization of Agriculture and then later from the Academy of Social Sciences under the CPSU Central Committee in 1991. He earned a PhD in Economics in 1999.

Yessimov started his professional experience in 1968 as a sports methodologist at the Druzhba State Farm; upon graduation from the institute, he worked as a mechanical engineer at the Leninsky State Farm and later as the chairman of Trade Union Working Committee at the Kazakh Research Institute of Potato and Vegetable Farming.

In 1979, he became an instructor of Organizational Department at Kaskelen District Committee of the Communist Party of Kazakhstan and then he was elected Secretary of Leninsky State Farm Communist Party Committee. From 1982, Yessimov served as an instructor of Agriculture Department at Alma-Ata Oblast Committee of the Communist Party of Kazakhstan. In 1983, he became the director of the Leninsky State Farm. In 1985, Yessimov was appointed as chairman of Kaskelen District Executional Committee. In 1986, Yessimov was elected as the First Secretary of Chilik District Committee of the Communist Party of Kazakhstan.

== Early political career ==
From 1988, he occupied the positions as the First Deputy Chairman of Alma-Ata Oblast Executional Committee, chairman of the Oblast Agroindustry Committee and the secretary of Alma-Ata Oblast Committee of the Communist Party of Kazakhstan.

In 1990, Yessimov became the First Deputy Chairman of Agroindustry Committee of Kazakh SSR, and in 1991, the First Deputy Minister of Agriculture and Food of Kazakh SSR. From September 1991 to February 1992, he served as the chairman of Almaty Oblast Congress of People's Deputies.

On 8 February 1992, Yessimov was appointed as the head of the Almaty Region. He held that position until 12 October 1994, when he was appointed as the Deputy Prime Minister of Kazakhstan in Kazhegeldin's cabinet. On 4 March 1996, Yessimov became the State Secretary of Kazakhstan. While serving that position, he was appointed as the acting head of the Presidential Administration of Kazakhstan on 22 July 1996. On 24 October 1996, Yessimov became the First Deputy Prime Minister of Kazakhstan until he was appointed as the Ambassador Extraordinary and Plenipotentiary of Kazakhstan in Belgium, the Netherlands and Luxembourg. He was in charge of the Representation of the Republic of Kazakhstan in the EU and NATO.

=== Minister of Agriculture (2001–2006) ===
From 18 May 2001 to 14 May 2004, Yessimov worked as the Minister of Agriculture and from 28 May 2002, the Deputy Prime Minister. He was reappointed as the Minister on 19 January 2006. During his tenure, Kazakhstan rose up to the world's first line in export of flour

=== OSCE and ENP campaign ===
Yessimov led a government delegation in negotiations over Kazakhstan's campaign to head the Organization for Security and Cooperation in Europe in 2009 with Finnish Foreign Ministry Secretary of State, Pertti Torstila in July 2006 as Finland held the Presidency of the European Union. Torstila said the EU would not announce its decision until autumn, but at the moment the EU "welcome[s] the candidacy of Kazakhstan in principle" while expressing concerns over treatment of free speech. If Kazakhstan is successful then it will be the first member of the Commonwealth of Independent States to head the OSCE. Yesimov noted that Kazakhstan produced 60 million tons of oil in 2005 and predicted production would soon reach "100 million tons and more".

After the adoption of a new version of its 'green book' [draft policy document] on energy policy by the EU," Germany "is looking to import 20% of its energy resources from the Caspian region. Last year, Kazakhstan's exports of energy resources to the EU exceeded $10 billion." On 18 July, Yesimov asked the EU to allow Kazakhstan to join its European Neighborhood Policy and to begin negotiating a Strategic Partnership Treaty, but EU officials expressed opposition to the change in European Union-Kazakhstan relations. Torstila and Yesimov said they "thoroughly" discussed refugees from Uzbekistan who left after the May 2005 unrest in Andijan. The delegation also included Konstantin Zhigalov, Kazakhstan's ambassador to Germany.

== Akim of Almaty (2008–2015) ==
On 4 April 2008, at its 9th Extraordinary Session, the Almaty City Mäslihat unanimously approved Yessimov's nomination to the post of akim of the city. On 16 October 2008, at the VIII Extraordinary Nur Otan City Conference, Yessimov was elected as the chairman of the Nur Otan city wing. That same year, the Alatau district was established out of the problematic villages earlier annexed by the city.

In 2010, Yessimov continually brought up the issue of particular raise of salaries of Almaty medics and teachers to the Government, referring to the high living standards in the city.

In 2011, the Asian Winter Games were successfully hosted in Almaty; for the purpose of which sportive infrastructure was created in the city Yessimov initiated establishment of municipal public transport and gradual driving private carriers out of the market. That same year, the Almaty Metro was opened.

Yessimov started his policies from solution of problems of cheated participants in shared-equity residential construction. At that time, the city counted 125 residential compounds with frozen construction activities. As a result, with support of President Nursultan Nazarbayev, almost all the construction investors of the city got housing. In less than five years, 20 new substations were constructed in the city which solved energy problems to a great extent.

On 6 October 2013, by initiative of Yessimov and Olympic Champion Aleksandr Vinokurov, the Almaty Administration organized and successfully hosted the first in Kazakh history professional cycling race “Tour of Almaty” under the auspices of UCI, Category 1,2. The cycling race was broadcast by the Eurosport TV Channel.

In 2014, for the first time in the history of the city, the gross regional product volume of Almaty exceeded 8 trillion tenge. That same year, thousands of young creative teachers of the city received monetary awards of 300,000 tenge. By decision of the extraordinary XXIX Session of Almaty City Mäslihat, Nauryzbai District was established, and the area of the city expanded. By the end of 2014, the population of Nauryzbay exceeded 180,000 people.

Yessimov also advocated of mountain skiing tourism development in Almaty Region, claiming that it is one of the most promising economy lines.

=== Criticism ===
Yessimov was criticized by multiple city dwellers for a bad preparation towards winter season heating system and the removal of snow. His idea to construct a mountain skiing facility on environmentally protected mountain slopes near Almaty also received criticism.

In 2015, he was mocked on social media after his statements about Almaty citizens often flying to the mountains by copters to play golf and ski.

== Chairman of JSC EXPO-2017 (2015–2017) ==
On 9 August 2015, by the order of President Nursultan Nazarbayev, Yessimov was appointed as the chairman of Board of Astana EXPO-2017 National Company. Yessimov was released from his position as the Almaty äkim by the presidential decree. He succeeded former äkim Adilbek Dzhaksybekov, whom had occupied the post prior after upon arrest of Talgat Ermegiyaev. Immediately upon appointment of Yessimov to the post, expenses for construction of the EXPO Village were cut by 78 billion tenge, and the top management of the company was downsized twofold. To attract responsible contractors, Yessimov undertook trips to Kazakh regions. As a result, the Kazakhstani content share of the companies participating in the EXPO-2017 International Exhibition construction amounted to 90%.

The budget cost of construction of the Exhibition facilities was cut by 302 billion tenge.

On 21 April 2017, President Nazarbayev marked the high level of preparedness of the exhibition for operation, saying that "Commendable organization of the Exhibition hosting will once again demonstrate achievements of independent Kazakhstan to the whole world."

On 23 February 2017, upon inspecting the Astana EXPO-2017 Exhibition facilities, Secretary General of the International Exhibition Bureau Vicente Loscertales declared that “it will be the best Exhibition in the recent 25 years”.

Within the entire period since June 10 through September 9, the EXPO-2017 International Specialized Exhibition was visited by about 4,000,000 people.

During EXPO-2017, 220 official events were organized attended by 28 heads of states, 13 speakers and secretaries general of parliaments, 10 prime ministers, 26 deputy prime ministers, 70 ministers and 48 vice ministers. 39 agreements were signed by participant countries with representative of business, scientific and educational circles of Kazakhstan in energy, construction and investment sectors. 193 revolutionary ‘green’ technologies were demonstrated, the dominant part of which is being successfully implemented in Kazakhstan.

On account of budget optimization, Astana EXPO-2017 National Company saved KZT 364 billion: 44.6% of the project initial cost. The Exhibition gave a considerable multiplicative effect to the economy of Kazakhstan. Over 1,400 small and middle scale business enterprises received orders for delivery of commodities and services for KZT 640 billion. Over 50 K jobs were created. The demand for tour operator services grew almost twofold. The number of enterprises in Astana grew by over 10%. The Astana budget tax revenues grew 1.2 times.

“Astana, the capital of Kazakhstan, attracted significant international attention in connection with EXPO 2017. The city was named “City of the Future” by National Geographic, and Kazakhstan was included in The New York Times list of recommended travel destinations. During the EXPO, more than 6,000 events were held. According to statements made by the President of Kazakhstan at the closing ceremony of EXPO 2017, the event contributed to increased interaction among science, business, and society, and was presented as reflecting the country’s development within the Eurasian region.

EXPO-2017 was highly appraised by foreign visitors.

The EXPO-2017 Heritage facilities continue functioning as tourist attractions.

== Chairman of Samruk-Kazyna (2017–2021) ==
On 23 December 2017, by the order of Nursultan Nazarbayev, Yessimov was appointed Chairman of board of the National Welfare Fund JSC Samruk-Kazyna.

In February 2018, on behalf of Yessimov, Samruk-Kazyna JSC introduced a number of changes to the procurement mechanism to expand the competitive environment, improve the quality of goods and services, and reduce costs. On 19 April 2018, at a meeting of the Management Council of the NWF “Samruk-Kazyna”, the President of the Republic of Kazakhstan Nursultan Nazarbayev approved and adopted a new Development Strategy of the Fund for 2018–2028 and an updated Transformation Program. That same month, Yessimov presented a new personnel policy of the “Samruk-Kazyna” National Welfare Fund. Within the framework of it, in order to attract young talents in the group of the Fund, the programs "Zhas Orken" and "Digital Summer" are being implemented. For two years more than 100 students were employed in the Samruk-Kazyna company. In 2018, it was introduced into the mechanism of off-take contracts, which allows entrepreneurs to receive in advance a guaranteed long-term order for products planned for release as part of the creation of a new production. Since 2017, the Fund's debt burden has decreased by 1 trillion tenge, and the external debt - by 5.1 billion US dollars. The Fund became the number one taxpayer in the country. Tax payments of the group of companies of NWF “Samruk-Kazyna JSC” for 9 months of this year amounted to 813 billion tenge, which is more by 102 billion tenge compared to the data of the same period in 2018. The Saryarqa Gas Pipeline was completed on time. The gas pipeline, built within the framework of the Five Social Initiatives of the First President of Kazakhstan, connected Central Kazakhstan and the capital of our state with a single gas transmission network of the country.

Under the leadership of Yessimov, Kazatomprom JSC became the first national company to successfully place its shares on the international stock exchange. The national company has successfully placed 15% of its shares worth $451 million on the London Stock Exchange. Demand exceeded supply 1.7 times. The first low-cost airline FlyArystan was launched on 1 May 2019.

During the crisis in 2020, the anti-crisis measures taken by NWF “Samruk-Kazyna” JSC under Yessimov's tenure made it possible to preserve the continuous operation of the Fund's portfolio companies and workers' jobs.

Samruk-Kazyna entered the top-20 UN funds for the implementation of sustainable development initiatives.

On 29 March 2021, Yessimov resigned from the post. Former president Nursultan Nazarbayev praised Yessimov's work, stating that under him, "Yesimov most effectively solved the tasks assigned to him in other important government positions."
