= Ministry of Oil and Gas (Kazakhstan) =

Government ministry of Kazakhstan

Ministry of Oil and Gas of the Republic of Kazakhstan
- Emblem of Kazakhstan

- Office building of the Ministry of Oil and Gas

Ministerial Department overview
- Formed: 12 March 2010
- Preceding Ministerial Department: Ministry of Energy and Mineral Resources
- Dissolved: 4 August 2014
- Superseding Ministerial Department: Ministry of Energy
- Jurisdiction: Government of Kazakhstan
- Headquarters: Nur-Sultan, Kazakhstan
- Website: Official website

The Ministry of Oil and Gas of the Republic of Kazakhstan (MOG RK, Kazakh: Қазақстан Республикасы Мұнай және газ министрлігі, romanized: Qazaqstan Respublikasy Mūnai jäne gaz ministrlıgı, ҚР МГМ; Russian: Министерство нефти и газа Республики Казахстан, МНГ РК) was one of the governmental bodies of Kazakhstan and part of the cabinet. The ministry had the function of developing and implementing policies related to petroleum and petroleum products.

== History and profile ==
The ministry was established on 12 March 2010 and is the successor of the ministry of energy and mineral resources.

Uzakbai Karabalin has been the minister of oil and gas since July 2013. He replaced Sauat Mynbayev in the post. Mynbayev was the first minister of oil and gas.

The main function of the ministry is to oversee and regulate the oil and gas sector in the country which was largely carried out by the national oil company, KazMunaiGas, until the establishment of the ministry.
