= Yerbol Orynbayev =

Deputy prime minister of Kazakhstan

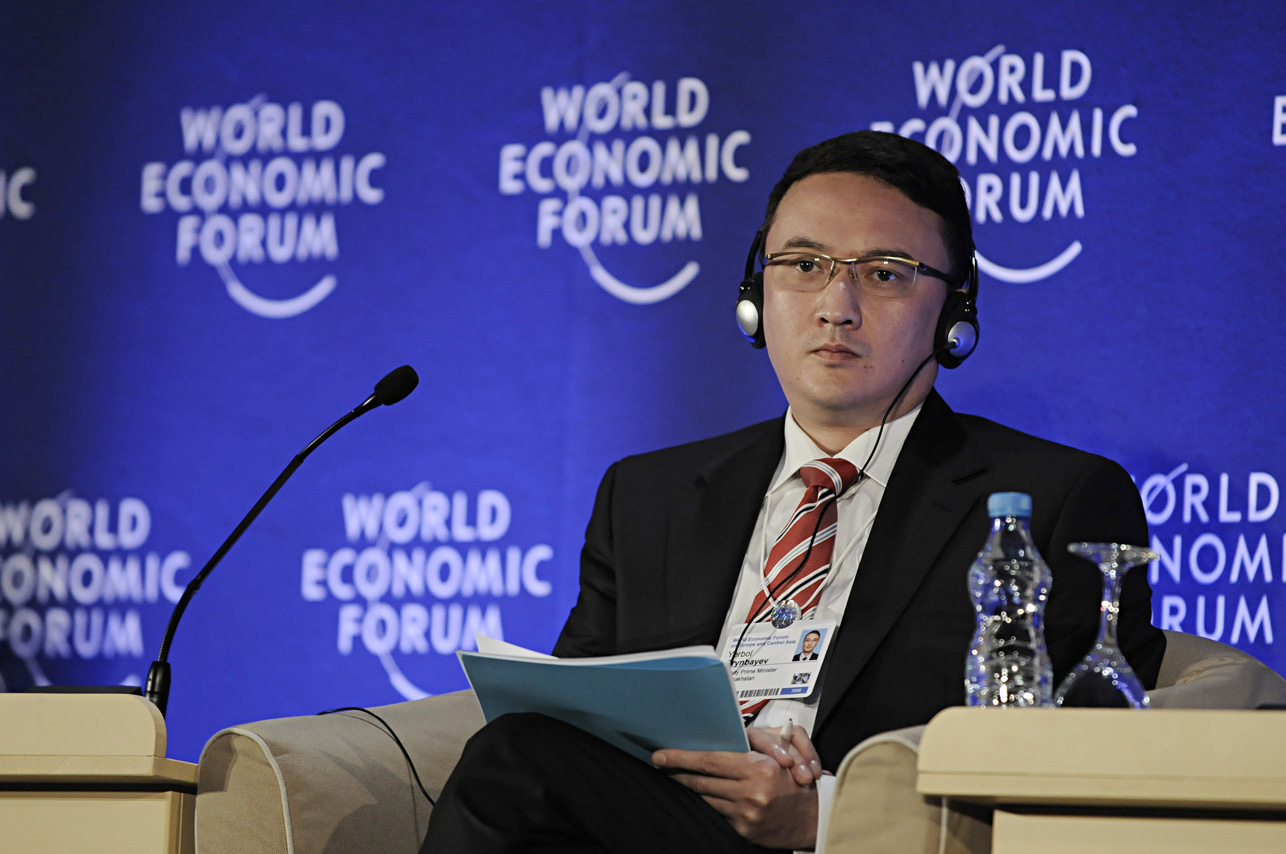

Financier

Personal details
- Born: 29 June 1971 (age 55) Shymkent

Yerbol Orynbayev (Kazakh: Ербол Тұрмаханұлы Орынбаев, Erbol Tūrmahanūly Orynbaev, born 29 June 1971 in Shymkent, South Kazakhstan) is an independent consultant for leading financial and technology companies. He is the former Deputy Prime Minister of Kazakhstan (2007-2013).

He has held a number of other senior ranking positions within the Government of Kazakhstan, including as Aide to the President on Economic Policy (2013-2015) and as Head of the Prime Minister's Office (2007-2008). For many years, he served as the governor of the World Bank on behalf of the Government of Kazakhstan. Following his resignation from the Government in 2015, he joined the private sector, acting as a private consultant in the fields of finance, strategy and technology.

He has also served as a board member of the National Bank of Kazakhstan, Agency for Regulations of Financial Markets as well as for large companies and nonprofits, including sovereign wealth fund Samruk-Kazyna.

== Education ==
Mr. Orynbayev is the graduate in law from Lomonosov Moscow State University (1989—1993) and Duke University (2000—2002), Master's degree in International Economic Development.

== Career ==
He began his career in the private sector having worked for banks and private companies. He co-founded a number of finance, trade and certification companies.

From 1996, he held senior positions at Kazakhstan Government and international financial institutions. Among those Mr. Orynbayev was Deputy Governor (Akim) of South Kazakhstan Region (1996–1997), Vice Minister of Economy and Budget Planning of the Republic of Kazakhstan (2002–2003), Deputy Prime Minister of the Republic of Kazakhstan (2007–2013), Aide to the President of the Republic of Kazakhstan on economic issues (2013–2015), managing director at International Bank for Reconstruction and Development, Member of the board of directors at National Bank of Kazakhstan and Agency for Regulation and Supervision of Financial Market and Financial Organizations. He was a key participant in the OECD Eurasia Competitiveness Programme, serving as an expert on regional trade and economic issues. He has served as a guest speaker at the World Economic Forum, Davos and other international summits.

Since his resignation from the public sector in 2015, he has held a number of senior positions in private financial, research and technology companies.

== Personal life ==
Yerbol is married with four children. He and his family have been residing in the US since 2017.

Yerbol is active in supporting philanthropy, especially in relation to education.

== National awards ==
- "Parasat" Order (2012);
- "Kurmet" Order (2006).

== References and Articles ==
Articles:

- Orynbayev, Yerbol. "Future of Banking: Ecosystems". LinkedIn.
- Orynbayev, Yerbol. "Transforming Kazakhstan: The Journey of Western style Education". LinkedIn.
