= Bakhyt Sultanov =

Kazakh politician (born 1971)

- Бақыт Сұлтанов
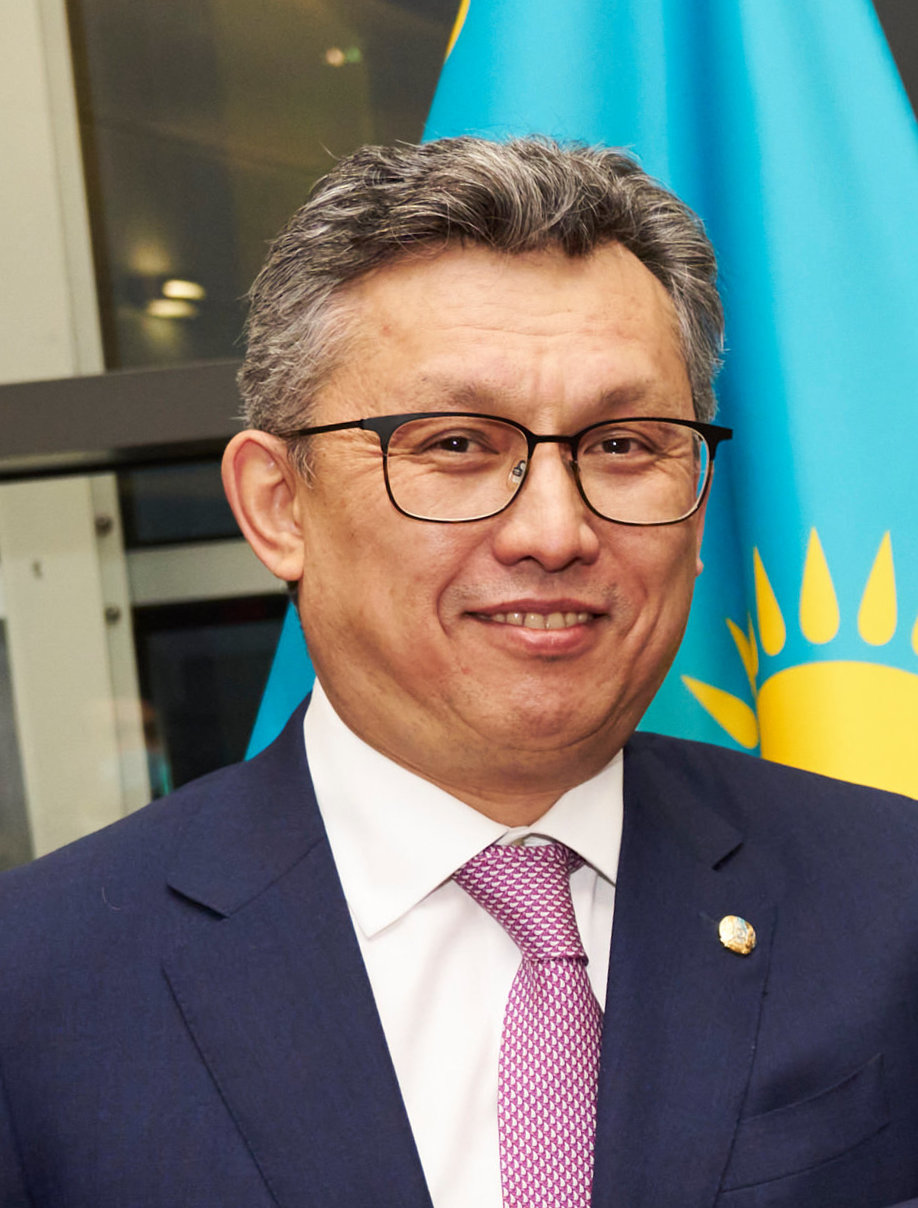
- Sultanov in 2021

Minister in charge of Economy and Financial Policy of the Eurasian Economic Commission
- Incumbent
- Assumed office 6 October 2022
- Preceded by: Arman Şaqqaliev

Deputy Prime Minister of Kazakhstan
- In office 11 January 2022 – 15 August 2022
- President: Kassym-Jomart Tokayev
- Prime Minister: Älihan Smaiylov
- In office 6 November 2013 – 6 August 2014
- President: Kassym-Jomart Tokayev
- Prime Minister: Serik Akhmetov

Minister of Trade and Integration of Kazakhstan
- In office 17 June 2019 – 15 August 2022
- President: Kassym-Jomart Tokayev
- Prime Minister: Asqar Mamin; Älihan Smaiylov
- Preceded by: position established
- Succeeded by: Serik Jumanğarin

Äkim of Nur-Sultan
- In office 11 September 2018 – 13 June 2019
- President: Nursultan Nazarbayev; Kassym-Jomart Tokayev
- Preceded by: Asset Issekeshev
- Succeeded by: Altai Kölgınov

Minister of Finance of Kazakhstan
- In office 6 November 2013 – 11 September 2018
- President: Nursultan Nazarbayev
- Prime Minister: Serik Akhmetov; Karim Massimov; Bakhytzhan Sagintayev
- Preceded by: Bolat Jämışev
- Succeeded by: Älihan Smaiylov

Minister of Economy and Budget Planning
- In office 10 August 2007 – 12 March 2010
- President: Nursultan Nazarbayev
- Prime Minister: Karim Massimov
- Preceded by: Aslan Musin
- Succeeded by: Zhanar Aitzhanova (Economic Development and Trade)

Personal details
- Born: 29 November 1971 (age 54) Alma-Ata, Kazakh SSR, Soviet Union (now Kazakhstan)
- Party: Nur Otan
- Education: Satbayev University; Narxoz University

Bakhyt Turlykhanuly Sultanov (Kazakh: Бақыт Тұрлыханұлы Сұлтанов, Baqyt Tūrlyhanūly Sūltanov; born 29 November 1971) is a Kazakh politician and financier serving as Minister in charge of Economy and Financial Policy of the Eurasian Economic Commission since 2022. Previously, from 2019 to 2022 he was a Minister of Trade and Integration of Kazakhstan and from 2018 to 2019 Äkim of Nur-Sultan. From 2013 to 2018, he served as Minister of Finance of Kazakhstan.

== Biography ==
=== Early life and education ===
Sultanov was born in Alma Ata (now Almaty). In 1988, he graduated from the Republican Physics and Mathematics Boarding School, in 1994 from the Sätbaev University with a degree in electrical engineering and in 1995, from the Narkhoz University with a degree in economics.

=== Career ===
Sultanov began his career in 1994 as a leading economist in the corporation and licensing department of the Financial Market Securities Department at the Ministry of Finance where he progressed from senior economist to being director of the department.

From September 2002 to June 2003, Sultanov was the director of the Department of Budgetary Policy and Planning of the Ministry of Economy and Budget Planning.

In June 2003, he became Vice Minister of Economy and Budget Planning and served that position until being appointed as the chairman of the Agency on Statistics of the Republic of Kazakhstan in February 2006.

In January 2007, he became Vice Minister of Finance until 10 August 2007, when he was appointed as the Minister of Economy and Budget Planning.

On 13 March 2010, by a presidential decree, Sultanov was appointed as assistant to the President of Kazakhstan.

From 21 January 2012, he served as a deputy head of the Presidential Administration.

On 6 November 2013, Sultanov was appointed as a Deputy Prime Minister of Kazakhstan and Minister of Finance.

He served the post until becoming the mayor of Astana on 11 September 2018.

Since 17 June 2019, Sultanov has been serving as Minister of Trade and Integration.

From January 11, 2022 - August 15, 2022 - appointed Deputy Prime Minister - Minister of Trade and Integration of the Republic of Kazakhstan.

Since October 6, 2022 — Member of the Board for Competition and Antimonopoly Regulation of the Eurasian Economic Commission

== Awards ==
Country	Date	Award
Kazakhstan	2001	Letter of thanks from the President of the Republic of Kazakhstan
Kazakhstan	2005	Letter of thanks from the Prime Minister of the Republic of Kazakhstan
Kazakhstan	2006	Knight of the Order of Kurmet
Kazakhstan	2012	Knight of the Order of Parasat
Kazakhstan	2008	Medal "10 years of Astana"
Kazakhstan	2006	Medal "10 years of the Parliament of the Republic of Kazakhstan"
Kazakhstan	2011	Medal "20 years of Independence of the Republic of Kazakhstan"
Kazakhstan	2015	Medal "20 years of the Constitution of the Republic of Kazakhstan"
Kazakhstan	2018	Jubilee medal "20 years of Astana"
Kazakhstan	2014	Excellent student of financial service

Political offices
Preceded by Bolat Zhamishev	Minister of Finance; 2013–2018	Succeeded by Alihan Smaiylov
