= Sauat Mynbayev =

Kazakh politician (born 1962)

- Сауат Мыңбаев
- Mynbayev in 2003

Minister of Oil and Gas
- In office 12 March 2010 – 3 July 2013
- Preceded by: Office established
- Succeeded by: Uzakbai Karabalin

Minister of Energy and Mineral Resources
- In office 27 August 2010 – 12 March 2010
- Prime Minister: Karim Massimov
- Preceded by: Baktykozha Izmukhambetov
- Succeeded by: Office abolished

Minister of Industry and Trade
- In office 14 December 2004 – 19 January 2006
- Prime Minister: Daniyal Akhmetov
- Preceded by: Adilbek Dzhaksybekov
- Succeeded by: Vladimir Shkolnik

Minister of Agriculture
- In office 26 July 1999 – 18 May 2001
- Preceded by: Zhanybek Karibzhanov
- Succeeded by: Akhmetzhan Yessimov

Minister of Finance
- In office 21 February 1998 – 22 January 1999
- Preceded by: Aleksandr Pavlov
- Succeeded by: Oraz Jandosov

Personal details
- Born: Sauat Mukhametbayevich Mynbayev; 19 November 1962 (age 63)
- Spouse: Janar Qalieva
- Education: Moscow State University

Sauat Mūhametbaiūly Myñbaev (Note: Often transliterated through the Russified Romanization Sauat Mukhametbayuly Mynbayev of Russian: Сауат Мухамтбайулы Мынбаев) (Kazakh: Сауат Мұхаметбайұлы Мыңбаев) is a Kazakh politician who served as the Minister of Oil and Gas of Kazakhstan from 2010 to 2013. Until 2021 he was also the CEO of Kazakhstan Temir zholy. Having held numerous ministerial positions, he was also Deputy Prime Minister of Kazakhstan from 2003 to 2006.

== Biography ==
Mynbayev was born on 19 November 1962. In 1985, he received a degree in economics from Moscow State University and he obtained a master's degree again in economics in 1988.

Labor activity began as a teacher of the Almaty Institute of National Economy of the Kazakh SSR.

In 1991–1992, he worked as President of the Republican Construction Exchange "Kazakhstan".

From 1992 to 1995, he was First Deputy Chairman of the Board of Joint Stock Bank "Kazkommertsbank".

In 1995, he was appointed as Deputy Minister of Finance of the Republic of Kazakhstan – the head of the Treasury; First Deputy Minister of Finance of the Republic of Kazakhstan.

In 1998, by the decree of the President of the Republic of Kazakhstan, he was appointed Minister of Finance of the Republic of Kazakhstan.

In 1999, he was appointed Deputy Head of the Presidential Administration of the Republic of Kazakhstan.

From 1999 to 2001, he is the Minister of Agriculture of Kazakhstan.

Since 2001, he worked as president of the "Bank of Development of Kazakhstan".

In 2002–2003, he headed the Caspian Industrial Financial Group.

From June 2003, Mynbayev is Deputy Prime Minister of Kazakhstan.

In 2004, he is appointed Deputy Prime Minister – Minister of Industry and Trade.

From February 2006, he headed the JSC "Samruk".

From September 2007 until March 2010, Mynbayev was the minister of energy and mineral resources.

On 12 March 2010, he was named as the head of the newly created ministry of oil and gas. Mynbayev's term ended on 3 July 2013 and he was replaced by Uzakbay Karabalin in the post.

From 2018 to 2021, he was Chairman of the Board of Kazakhstan Temir Zholy.

== Activities ==
In 2009, Mynbayev and Chinese officials discussed the current state and prospects of cooperation within the CNPC-AktobeMunaiGaz JV to develop Kenkiyak and Zhanazhol oilfields; they also dwelt on completion of the 2nd segment of the Kazakhstan-China oil pipeline as well as on new bilateral projects.

=== Paradise Papers ===
In November 2017, an investigation conducted by the International Consortium of Investigative Journalism cited his name in the list of politicians named in "Paradise Papers" allegations.

== Awards ==
- Order of the Leopard I degree (2018);
- Order of the Leopard II degree (2012);
- Order of the Leopard III degree (2005);
- Order of Friendship (12 December 2004, Russia);
- Medal "10 years of Astana"
