= First Deputy Prime Minister of Kazakhstan =

- Қазақстан Премьер-Министрінің бірінші орынбасары
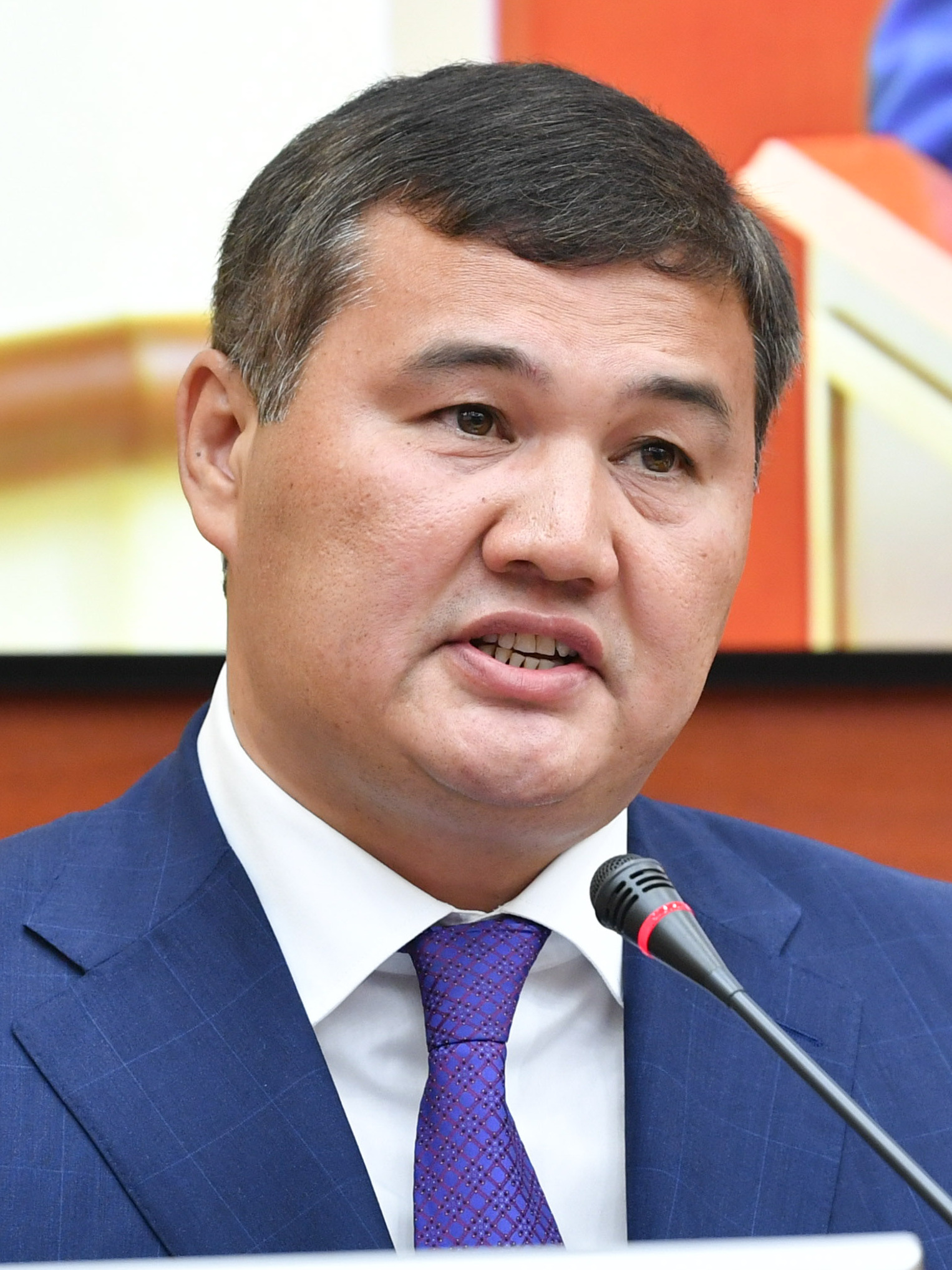
- Incumbent; Nurlybek Nalibaev since 6 May 2026
- Residence: Astana
- Appointer: President of Kazakhstan
- Term length: No fixed term
- Inaugural holder: Yevgeny Yozhikov-Babakhanov
- Formation: 16 December 1991; 34 years ago

The first deputy prime minister of the Republic of Kazakhstan (Kazakh: Қазақстан Республикасы Премьер-Министрінің бірінші орынбасары, romanized: Qazaqstan Respublikasy Premer-Ministrınıñ bırınşı orynbasary;; Russian: Первый заместитель Премьер-Министра Республики Казахстан) is a member of the Government of Kazakhstan. Similar to the deputy prime minister, the first deputy is responsible for implementing policies established by the prime minister. However, the first deputy holds a higher-ranking position and assumes a more prominent role, particularly in the event that the prime minister is unable to perform their duties. The post is appointed by the president of Kazakhstan.

== List ==
| No. | First Deputy PM | Term of Office | | Prime Minister |
|---|---|---|---|---|
| 1 | Yevgeny Ezhikov-Babakhanov (1942–2023) | 16 December 1991 | 6 February 1992 | Sergey Tereshchenko |
| 2 | Daulet Sembaev (1935–2021) | 6 February 1992 | 17 December 1993 | Sergey Tereshchenko |
| 3 | Oleg Soskovets (born 1949) | 6 February 1992 | 5 November 1992 | Sergey Tereshchenko |
| 4 | Akezhan Kazhegeldin (born 1952) | 18 December 1993 | 12 October 1994 | Sergey Tereshchenko |
| 5 | Nygmetjan Esengarin (born 1941) | 12 October 1994 | 24 July 1997 | Akezhan Kazhegeldin |
| 6 | Vitaly Mette (1947–2003) | 13 March 1995 | 14 March 1996 | Akezhan Kazhegeldin |
| 7 | Akhmetzhan Yessimov (born 1950) | 24 October 1996 | 20 February 1998 | Nurlan Balgimbayev |
| 8 | Oraz Jandosov (born 1961) | 20 February 1998 | 22 January 1999 | Nurlan Balgimbayev |
| Vacant (Jan. 1999–Oct. 1999) | | | | Nurlan Balgimbayev |
| 10 | Aleksandr Pavlov (born 1953) | 12 October 1999 | 23 November 2000 | Nurlan Balgimbayev |
| 10 | Aleksandr Pavlov (born 1953) | 12 October 1999 | 23 November 2000 | Kassym-Jomart Tokayev |
| 11 | Daniyal Akhmetov (born 1954) | 21 December 2000 | 21 November 2001 | Kassym-Jomart Tokayev |
| 12 | Aleksandr Pavlov (born 1953) | 28 August 2002 | 6 January 2004 | Imangali Tasmangambetov |
| 12 | Aleksandr Pavlov (born 1953) | 28 August 2002 | 6 January 2004 | Daniyal Akhmetov |
| 13 | Grigori Marchenko (born 1959) | 6 January 2004 | 14 April 2004 | Daniyal Akhmetov |
| | Vacant (2004–2009) | | | Daniyal Akhmetov |
| | Vacant (2004–2009) | | | Karim Massimov |
| 14 | Umirzak Shukeyev (born 1964) | 3 March 2009 | 27 December 2011 | Karim Massimov |
| 15 | Serik Akhmetov (born 1962) | 20 January 2012 | 24 September 2012 | Karim Massimov |
| 16 | Krymbek Kusherbayev (born 1955) | 26 September 2012 | 16 January 2013 | Serik Akhmetov |
| 17 | Bakhytzhan Sagintayev (born 1963) | 16 January 2013 | 8 September 2016 | Serik Akhmetov |
| 17 | Bakhytzhan Sagintayev (born 1963) | 16 January 2013 | 8 September 2016 | Karim Massimov |
| 18 | Askar Mamin (born 1965) | 8 September 2016 | 21 February 2019 | Bakhytzhan Sagintayev |
| 19 | Alihan Smaiylov (born 1972) | 25 February 2019 | 5 January 2021 | Asqar Mamin |
| 20 | Roman Sklyar (born 1971) | 11 January 2022 | 5 May 2026 | Älihan Smaiylov |
| 20 | Roman Sklyar (born 1971) | 11 January 2022 | 5 May 2026 | Oljas Bektenov |
| 21 | Nurlybek Nalibaev (born 1976) | 6 May 2026 | Incumbent | Oljas Bektenov |
