= Ministry of Finance (Kazakhstan) =

Government ministry of Kazakhstan

Ministry of Finance of the Republic of Kazakhstan
- Қазақстан Республикасы Қаржы министрлігі (Kazakh); Министерство финансов Республики Казахстан (Russian)
- Emblem of Kazakhstan

- Office building of the Ministry of Finance

Agency overview
- Formed: 17 December 1991
- Jurisdiction: Government of Kazakhstan
- Headquarters: Nur-Sultan, Kazakhstan
- Agency executive: Madi Takiyev, Minister
- Website: Official website

The Ministry of Finance of the Republic of Kazakhstan (MF RK, Kazakh: Қазақстан Республикасы Қаржы министрлігі, romanized: Qazaqstan Respublikasy Qarjy ministrlıgı, ҚР ҚарМин; Russian: Министерство финансов Республики Казахстан, МФ РК) is a central executive body of the Government of Kazakhstan, providing leadership and intersectoral coordination in the financial sector. It was established on 17 December 1991, just a day after Kazakhstan declared its independence from the Soviet Union, the Law "On budget system of the Republic of Kazakhstan" was introduced. The Ministry is currently led by Mädi Takiev.

== Ministers ==
- Tuleubek Abdikadirov, April 1990 — November 1992
- Erkeshbay Derbisov, 1992 — 1994
- Alexander Pavlov, October 1994 — February 1998
- Sauat Mynbayev, 1998 — 1999
- Oraz Jandosov, January 1999 — October 1999
- Mazhit Esenbayev, 1999 — January 2002
- Alexander Pavlov, January 2002 — June 2003
- Erbolat Dosaev, 2003 — April 2004
- Arman Dunayev, April 2004 — January 2006
- Natalya Korzhova, January 2006 — November 2007
- Bolat Zhamishev, November 2007 — November 2013
- Bakhyt Sultanov, November 2013 — September 2018
- Älihan Smaiylov, September 2018 — May 2020
- Erulan Jamaubaev, 18 May 2020 — 6 February 2024
- Mädi Takiev, 6 February 2024

== Tasks ==
- budget execution;
- budget accounting and reporting on budget execution;
- accounting and reporting on the National Fund of the Republic of Kazakhstan;
- ensuring the receipt of taxes and other mandatory payments to the budget;
- fullness and timeliness of transfer of mandatory pension contributions and social deductions to the State Security Fund;
- state regulation of production and turnover of ethyl alcohol and alcoholic products;
- state regulation of production and turnover of tobacco products;
- state regulation of production and turnover of individual types of petroleum products;
- state regulation in the field of customs;
- state and guaranteed borrowing by the state;
- budget lending;
- management of republican state property;
- management of government and guaranteed by the state debt and debt to the state;
- regulation of public procurement;
- implementation of internal financial control;
- implementation of control over bankruptcy procedures (with the exception of banks, insurance (reinsurance) organizations and accumulative pension funds);
- regulation of activities in the field of accounting and financial statements;
- regulation in the field of audit activity and control over the activities of audit and professional organizations, conducting state monitoring of property;
- financial monitoring for countering.

== Structure ==
=== Departments ===
For 2019:

- Department of Reporting and Statistics of Public Finance;
- Department of Budget Planning;
- Department of State Budget;
- Department of Budget of Law Enforcement, Special Organs and Defense;
- Department of Budget of Social Sphere;
- Department of Budget of Industry, Transport and Communications;
- Department of Budget of the Agro-Industrial Complex, Natural Resources, Construction and Housing and Communal Services;
- Department of Budget Legislation;
- Department of Tax and Customs Law;
- Department of Appeals;
- Department of State Procurement Legislation;
- Department of Accounting and Auditing Methodology;
- Department of International Financial Relations;
- Department of State Borrowing;
- Department of Budget Lending, National Fund of the Republic of Kazakhstan and the Interaction on Financial Sector;
- Department of Legal Service;
- Department of Digitalization and Public Services;

== See also ==
- Economy of Kazakhstan
