= Ministry of Justice (Kazakhstan) =

Government ministry of Kazakhstan

Ministry of Justice of the Republic of Kazakhstan
- Қазақстан Республикасы Әділет министрлігі Qazaqstan Respublikasy Ädilet mīnīstrligi
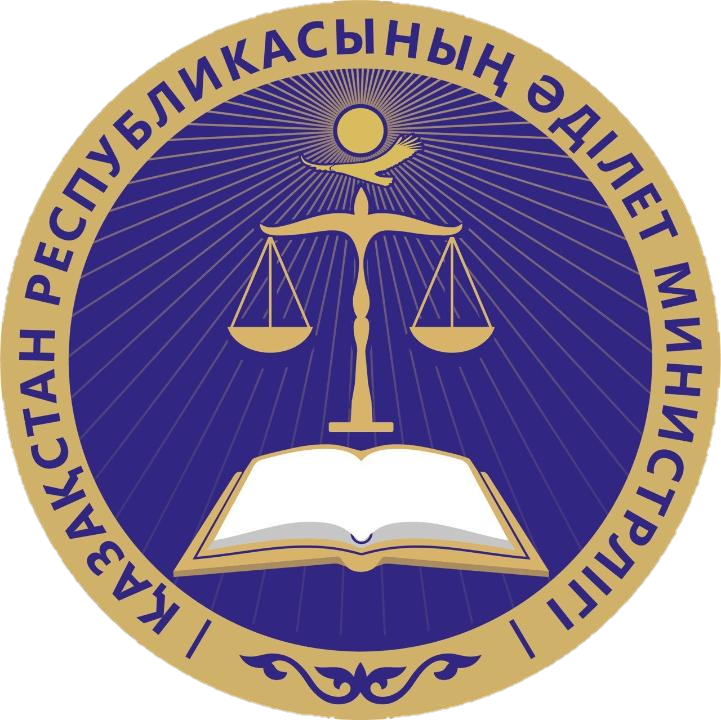
- Seal of the ministry

Agency overview
- Formed: 1920
- Jurisdiction: Government of Kazakhstan
- Headquarters: Astana, Kazakhstan
- Minister responsible: Erlan Särsembaev
- Parent department: Government of Kazakhstan
- Website: gov.kz/memleket/entities/adilet

The Ministry of Justice of Kazakhstan (MJ RK, Kazakh: Қазақстан Республикасы Әділет министрлігі, romanized: Qazaqstan Respublikasy Ädılet ministrlıgı, [qɑzɑqˈstʰɑn rʲɪˈspublʲɪkɑsɯnɯŋ ædɘlʲet minɪstʰərlɘɡɘ], ҚР ӘМ; Russian: Министерство юстиции Республики Казахстан, МЮ РК) is government ministry tasked with the duty of overseeing the country's legal agencies.

== Organization ==
The ministry consists of the following departments:

- Nur-Sultan City Justice Department
- Almaty City Justice Department
- Akmola Regional Justice Department
- Aktobe Regional Justice Department
- Almaty Regional Justice Department
- Atyrau Regional Justice Department
- West Kazakhstan Regional Justice Department
- Jambyl Region Regional Justice Department
- Karaganda Regional Justice Department
- Karaganda City Justice Department
- Kostanay Regional Justice Department
- Kyzylorda Regional Justice Department
- Mangystau Regional Justice Department
- South Kazakhstan Regional Justice Department
- Mangystau Regional Justice Department
- Pavlodar Regional Justice Department
- North Kazakhstan Regional Justice Department
- East Kazakhstan Regional Justice Department

National governmental bodies:

- Strategic Planning Department
- Department of legislation
- Department of registration of legal acts
- Department of State Property Rights Protection
- Department of International Law and Cooperation
- Department of Expertise of International Economic Integration Projects
- Department of registration service and organization of legal services
- Department of Intellectual Property Rights
- Department for the execution of judicial acts
- Department of Economics and Finance
- Department of Public Service Monitoring and Internal Administration
- Human Resources Department
- Internal Audit Office
- Management of the organization of work to protect state secrets
- Information Management
- Information Security Management

Subordinate organizations of the ministry:

- Center for legal expertise
- Legislation Institute of the Republic of Kazakhstan
- Center for Legal Information
- National Institute of Intellectual Property

== List of ministers ==
The following is a list of ministers who have held the office since 1943:

- Myrkazadyr Nurbayev (1943-1952)
- Kylyshbay Sultanov (1952-1960)
- Bekaydar Dzhussupov (1970-1984)
- Dolda Dospolov (1984-1990)
- Galikhan Yerzhanov (1990-1993)
- Nagashbay Shaykenov (1993-1995)
- Konstantin Kolpakov (1995-1997)
- Baurzhan Mukhamejanov (1997-2000)
- Igor Rogov (2000-2002)
- Georgy Kim (2002-2003)
- Onalsyn Zhumabekov (2003-2005)
- Zagipa Baliyeva (2005-2009) (1st female to hold that office)
- Rashid Tusupbekov (2009-2012)
- Berik Imashev (2012-2016)
- Marat Beketaev (2016-2022)
- Qanat Musin (2022-2023)
- Azamat Esqaraev (2023-2025)
- Erlan Särsembaev (2025-present)

== See also ==
- Justice ministry
- Politics of Kazakhstan
