= Apparatus of the Government (Kazakhstan) =

Kazakh government agency

Apparatus of the Government of the Republic of Kazakhstan
- Қазақстан Республикасы Үкіметінің Аппараты (Kazakh); Аппарат Правительства Республики Казахстан (Russian)
- Emblem of Kazakhstan

- Government building

Agency overview
- Formed: 1997; 2023
- Preceding agency: Office of the Prime Minister
- Jurisdiction: Government of Kazakhstan
- Headquarters: Astana, Kazakhstan
- Website: Official website

The Apparatus of the Government of the Republic of Kazakhstan (Kazakh: Қазақстан Республикасы Үкіметінің Аппараты, romanized: Qazaqstan Respublikasy Ükimetiniñ Apparaty; Russian: Аппарат Правительства Республики Казахстан) is a state body within the Government of Kazakhstan, which coordinates the activities of state bodies, control functions and other functions stipulated by law and the relevant Regulation, as well as an authorized state body to protect state secrets and ensure information security.

== History ==
First, the structure was named Administrative Department of the Council of People's Commissars of the Council of Ministers, then:

- Joint President's Office (1990–1991)
- Office of the President and Cabinet of Ministers (1991–1994)
- Department of Cabinet of Ministers (1995)
- Department of Government (1995–1997)
- Prime Minister's Office (1997)

== Structure ==
For 2020:

- Secretariat of Prime Minister of the Republic of Kazakhstan
- Center of Project Management
- Department of Human Resources
- Press Service Prime Minister of Kazakhstan
- Summary and Analysis department
- Government representation in the parliament of Kazakhstan
- Law department
- Department of Regional Development
- Economical department
- Department of Industrial Innovation Development
- Department of Social and Cultural Development
- Department of Foreign Economic Cooperation
- Department of Defense and Law Enforcement
- Department for the protection of public secrets and special types of connection
- Department of Finance and Economy
- Department of Control and Document Support
