= Nursultan Nazarbayev =

President of Kazakhstan from 1991 to 2019

- Нұрсұлтан Назарбаев
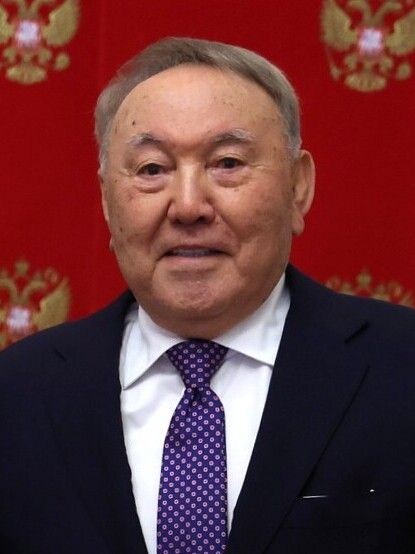
- Nazarbayev in 2025

1st President of Kazakhstan
- In office 16 December 1991 – 20 March 2019
- Prime Minister: See list: Uzakbay Karamanov; Sergey Tereshchenko; Akezhan Kazhegeldin; Nurlan Balgimbayev; Kassym-Jomart Tokayev; Imangali Tasmagambetov; Daniyal Akhmetov; Karim Massimov; Serik Akhmetov; Karim Massimov; Bakhytzhan Sagintayev; Asqar Mamin
- Vice President: Yerik Asanbayev (1991–1996)
- Preceded by: Office established (himself as President of the Kazakh SSR)
- Succeeded by: Kassym-Jomart Tokayev

Chairman of the Security Council of Kazakhstan
- In office 21 August 1991 – 5 January 2022
- Preceded by: Office established
- Succeeded by: Kassym-Jomart Tokayev

Chairman of Nur Otan
- In office 1 March 1999 – 28 January 2022
- Acting: See list: Sergey Tereshchenko; Amangeldı Ermegiaev; Bakhytzhan Zhumagulov
- Deputy: See list: Zharmakhan Tuyakbay; Aleksandr Pavlov; Amangeldi Ermegiaev
- First Deputy: See list: Bakhytzhan Zhumagulov; Adilbek Zhaksybekov; Darhan Kaletaev; Nurlan Nigmatulin; Bakhytzhan Sagintayev; Bauyrjan Baibek; Askar Myrzakhmetov; Mukhtar Kul-Mukhammed; Mäulen Äşimbaev; Bauyrjan Baibek
- Preceded by: Office established
- Succeeded by: Kassym-Jomart Tokayev

Chairman of the Assembly of People
- In office 1 March 1995 – 28 April 2021
- Preceded by: Office established
- Succeeded by: Kassym-Jomart Tokayev

Honorary Chairman of the Assembly of People
- In office 28 April 2021 – 5 January 2022
- Preceded by: Office established
- Succeeded by: Office abolished

Honorary Chairman of the Organization of Turkic States
- Incumbent
- Assumed office 25 April 2019
Kazakh SSR positions
President of the Kazakh SSR
In office 24 April 1990 – 16 December 1991
Vice President	Sergey Tereshchenko (1990–1991); Yerik Asanbayev (1991)
Preceded by	Office established
Succeeded by	Office abolished (Himself as President of Kazakhstan)
Chairman of the Supreme Soviet of the Kazakh SSR
In office 22 February 1990 – 24 April 1990
Premier	Uzakbay Karamanov
Preceded by	Kilibay Medeubekov
Succeeded by	Yerik Asanbayev
First Secretary of the Central Committee of the Communist Party of Kazakhstan
In office 22 June 1989 – 7 September 1991
Preceded by	Gennady Kolbin
Succeeded by	Office abolished
Chairman of the Council of Ministers of the Kazakh SSR
In office 22 March 1984 – 27 July 1989
Chairman	Bayken Ashimov; Salamay Mukashev; Zakash Kamaledinov; Vera Sidorova; Makhtay Sagdiyev
Preceded by	Bayken Ashimov
Succeeded by	Uzakbay Karamanov

Personal details
- Born: Nursultan Abishevich Nazarbayev; 6 July 1940 (age 86) Chemolgan, Kazakh SSR, Soviet Union
- Party: Independent (1991–1999, 2022–present)
- Other political affiliations: Communist (1962–1991); Nur Otan (1999–2022)
- Spouses: Sara Konakayeva (m. 1962); Assel Kurmanbayeva
- Children: Dariga; Dinara; Aliya; Tauman; Baiken
- Website: nazarbayev.kz

Military service
- Allegiance: Kazakhstan
- Branch/service: Armed Forces of the Republic of Kazakhstan
- Years of service: 1991–2019
- Rank: Supreme Commander
- Central institution membership: 2019–present: Honorary Chairman, Organization of Turkic States; 2021–2022: Honorary Chairman, Assembly of People of Kazakhstan; 2019–2023: Honorary Member, Senate of Kazakhstan; 2019–2023: Member, Constitutional Council of Kazakhstan; 1999–2022: Chairman, Nur Otan; 1995–2021: Chairman, Assembly of People of Kazakhstan; 1991–2022: Chairman, Security Council of Kazakhstan; 1989–1991: Member, 17th Secretariat of the Communist Party of Kazakhstan; 1986–1990: Full member, 27th & 28th Central Committee of the Communist Party of the Soviet Union; 1979–1984: Member, 14th & 15th Secretariat of the Communist Party of Kazakhstan

Nursultan Abishuly Nazarbayev (Note: /ˌnʊərsəlˈtɑːn əˈbɪʃʊli ˌnæzərˈbaɪɛf/; Kazakh: Нұрсұлтан Әбішұлы Назарбаев, Nūrsūltan Äbışūly Nazarbaev, Kazakh: [nʊrsʊɫˈtʰɑn æˌbɘʃʊˈɫə nɑˌzɑrˈbaɪf]; Russian: Нурсултан Абишевич Назарбаев, romanized: Nursultan Abishevich Nazarbayev) (born 6 July 1940) is a Kazakh politician who served as the first president of Kazakhstan from 1991 to 2019. He also held the special title of Elbasy (Note: /ˈɛlbəsi/ EL-bə-see; Kazakh pronunciation: [ˌjelʲbɑˈsə]; lit. 'Leader of the Nation') from 2010 to 2022 and chairman of the Security Council from 1991 to 2022.

Nazarbayev's political career began in the Soviet era, where he joined the Communist Party of the Soviet Union in 1962 while working as a steel factory worker. Rising through the party ranks, he became Prime Minister of the Kazakh SSR in 1984 and First Secretary of the Communist Party of Kazakhstan in 1989. In 1990, the Supreme Soviet elected him as the president of Kazakhstan. Nazarbayev played a key role in navigating Kazakhstan through the dissolution of the Soviet Union, leading to the country's independence in 1991. In the country’s first direct 1991 presidential election, Nazarbayev appeared on the ballot without opposition and secured an overwhelming victory. In 1995, ruling by decree, Nazarbayev extended his presidency through a referendum and adopted a new constitution that expanded his powers. He was re-elected in an undemocratic 1999 election, deemed eligible to run again in 2005 by a Supreme Court ruling, and benefited from a 2007 constitutional amendment solely exempting term limits for him, allowing undemocratic re-elections in 2011 and 2015.

In March 2019, following a wave of protests and increasing discontent, Nazarbayev announced his resignation, handing over power to Kassym-Jomart Tokayev. Tokayev was elected president in a snap election in June 2019. While Nazarbayev stepped down from the presidency, he remained a powerful figure in Kazakh politics, retaining influence through his leadership of the Assembly of People of Kazakhstan and the Nur Otan party. He also chaired the Security Council until his dismissal in 2022. Nazarbayev's power was diminished following the 2022 unrest, which led to a constitutional referendum that stripped him of many privileges and titles, including his membership in the Senate and the Constitutional Council. By 2023, he had lost most of his official titles, signaling the end of his political dominance.

Nazarbayev was one of the longest-ruling non-royal leaders in the world, having led Kazakhstan for nearly three decades, excluding chairmanship of the Security Council after the end of his presidency. He has often been referred to as a dictator due to his consolidation of power and autocratic rule. His tenure was marred by widespread authoritarianism, significant human rights abuses, nepotism, and systemic corruption. His leadership was further characterized by a pervasive cult of personality, with his image and influence deeply entrenched in the nation's political and social landscape. Nazarbayev gained recognition for his efforts in nuclear disarmament, renouncing Kazakhstan's inherited nuclear arsenal, and closing the Semipalatinsk Test Site.

== Early life and career ==
Nursultan Nazarbayev (Kazakh pronunciation) was born in Chemolgan, a village near Almaty, when Kazakhstan was one of the republics of the Soviet Union, to parents Äbiş Nazarbayev (1903–1970) and Äljan Nazarbayeva (1910–1978). His father Äbish was a poor labourer who worked for a wealthy local family until Soviet rule confiscated the family's farmland in the 1930s during Joseph Stalin's collectivization policy. Following this, his father took the family to the mountains to live out a nomadic existence. His family's religious tradition was Sunni Islam.

Äbiş avoided compulsory military service due to a withered arm he had sustained when putting out a fire. At the end of World War II, the family returned to the village of Chemolgan where in 1948, Nazarbayev began attending school and being taught the Russian language; while living with his paternal uncle, as his parents had not owned dwelling in the place for a brief period. Nazarbayev later himself chose to settle in the upper part of Chemolgan where mainly ethnic Russians lived, in order to master Russian while communicating with them. Despite performing well at school, by the time Nazarbayev was in 10th grade, all the classes in the same grade were called off due to a student shortage and as a result in 1957, he was sent to a boarding school named after Abai Qunanbaiuly in Kaskelen. During that time, Nazarbayev's father, Äbiş, wished to create favourable conditions towards his son for studying and living as well as to potentially avoid bad influence from peers by renting himself an apartment for Nazarbayev in the village.

After leaving school, Nazarbayev took up a one-year, government-funded scholarship at the Karaganda Steel Mill in Temirtau. He also spent time training at a steel plant in Dniprodzerzhynsk, and therefore was away from Temirtau when riots broke out there over working conditions. By the age of 20, he was earning a relatively good wage doing "incredibly heavy and dangerous work" in the blast furnace. From there, Nazarbayev married Sara Nazarbayeva on 25 August 1962, who was a dispatcher at the same steel mill that he worked in. Together, both parties would eventually have three daughters: Dariga, Dinara and Aliya, born in 1963, 1968 and 1980, respectively.

On 15 November 1962, Nazarbayev joined the Communist Party, becoming a prominent member of the Young Communist League (Komsomol) and full-time worker for the party, while attending the Karagandy Polytechnic Institute. He was appointed secretary of the Communist Party Committee of the Karaganda Metallurgical Kombinat in 1972, and four years later became Second Secretary of the Karaganda Regional Party Committee.

In his role as a bureaucrat, Nazarbayev dealt with legal papers, logistical problems, and industrial disputes, as well as meeting workers to solve individual issues. He later wrote that "the central allocation of capital investment and the distribution of funds" meant that infrastructure was poor, workers were demoralised and overworked, and centrally set targets were unrealistic; he saw the steel plant's problems as a microcosm for the problems for the Soviet Union as a whole.

=== Rise to power ===
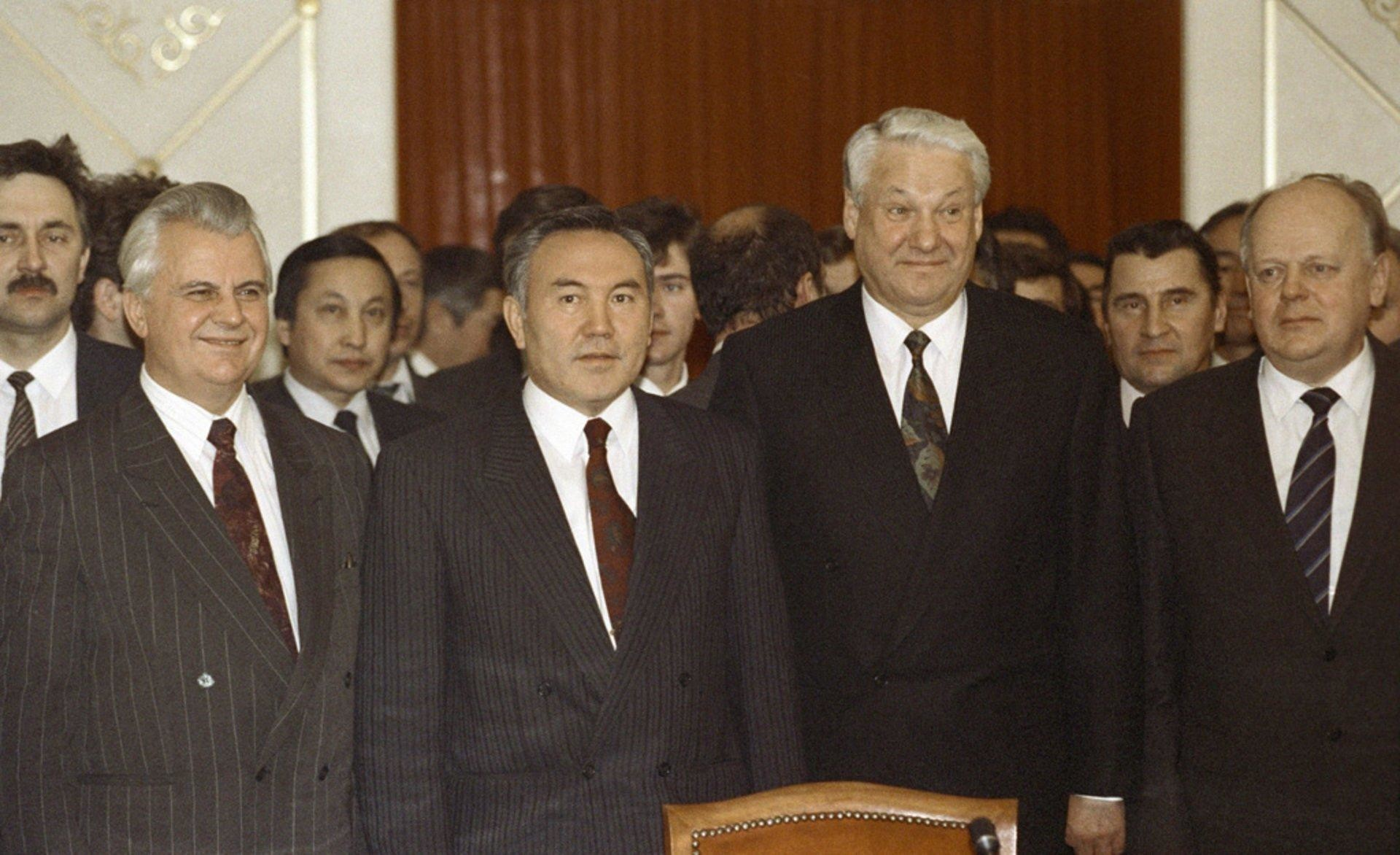
Nazarbayev (front row, second from left) at the signing of the Alma-Ata Protocol, 21 December 1991

In 1984, at the age 43, Nazarbayev became the prime minister of Kazakhstan (Chairman of the Council of Ministers), the youngest-ever officeholder in the Soviet Union to serve the post, under Dinmukhamed Kunaev, the First Secretary of the Communist Party of Kazakhstan. During that period, the Perestroika policies slowly began to take place under Mikhail Gorbachev while Nazarbayev himself was viewed to be more of experienced policy maker as his views and stances had already been formed during the Khrushchev Thaw and 1965 Soviet economic reform. Kazakhstan at that time was seen as a backwater republic within the Soviet Union with its industry being heavily reliant upon rich raw materials, specifically in mining sectors and was forced upon to import its consumer goods from other Soviet republics. It faced problems especially in countryside with a need for state farm repairs, as well as housing for farmers, lack of available preschools for rural children which Nazarbayev during his tenure raised issues in regard to these problems that was reportedly met with disagreements amongst the republic's leadership.

Growing frustrated over the problems within the Kazakh SSR, at the 16th Session of the Communist Party of Kazakhstan held in January 1986, Nazarbayev criticized Askar Kunayev, head of the Academy of Sciences, for not reforming his department. Dinmukhamed, Nazarbayev's boss and Askar's brother, felt deeply angered and betrayed. Kunayev went to Moscow and demanded Nazarbayev's dismissal while Nazarbayev's supporters campaigned for Kunayev's dismissal and Nazarbayev's promotion.

Kunayev was ousted in 1986 and replaced by Gennady Kolbin, an ethnic Russian, who despite his office, had little authority in Kazakhstan. Nazarbayev was named party leader and the top position (First Secretary of the Communist Party) on 22 June 1989, only the second Kazakh (after Kunayev) to hold the post. He was the chairman of the Supreme Soviet (head of state) from 22 February to 24 April 1990.

On 24 April 1990, Nazarbayev was elected as the first president of Kazakhstan by the Supreme Soviet. He supported Russian president Boris Yeltsin against the attempted coup in August 1991 by Soviet hardliners. Nazarbayev was close enough to Soviet general secretary Mikhail Gorbachev for Gorbachev to consider him for the post of Vice President of the Soviet Union; however, Nazarbayev turned the offer down. However, on 29 July, Gorbachev, Yeltsin, and Nazarbayev discussed and decided that once the New Union Treaty was signed, Nazarbayev would replace Valentin Pavlov as Premier of the Soviet Union.

The Soviet Union began disintegrating following the failed coup, though Nazarbayev was highly concerned with maintaining the close economic ties between Kazakhstan and Russia. In the country's first presidential election, held on 1 December, he appeared alone on the ballot and won 95% of the vote. On 16 December, Nazarbayev signed the Constitutional Law "On the State Independence of the Republic of Kazakhstan", which had been adopted earlier that day by the Supreme Soviet, formally establishing Kazakhstan as a sovereign state and making it the last Soviet republic to declare independence. Five days later, he joined other leaders in signing the Alma-Ata Protocol on 21 December, bringing Kazakhstan into the Commonwealth of Independent States.

== Presidency (1991–2019) ==
=== 1991–1999: First term ===
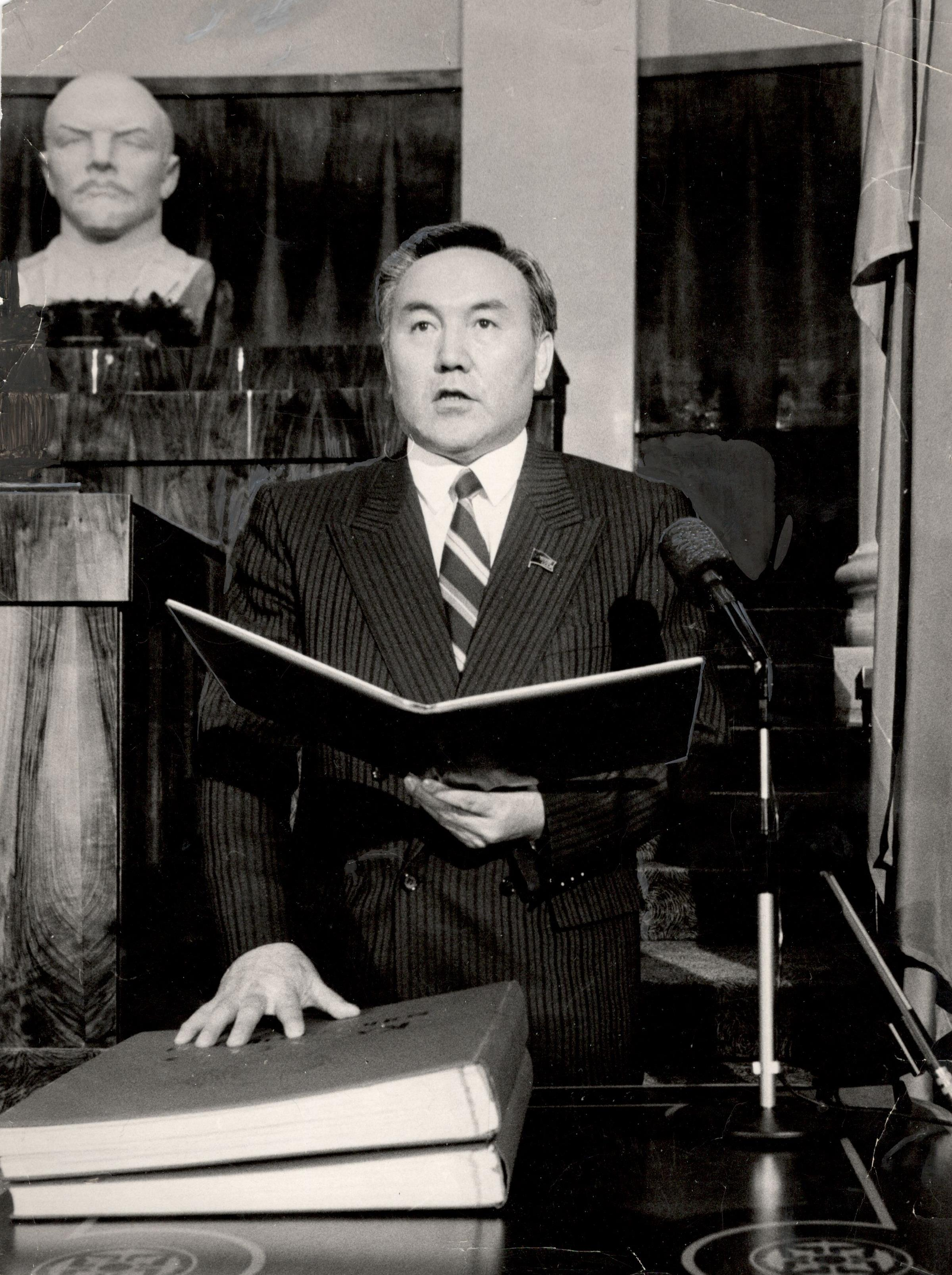
Nazarbayev taking the oath of office

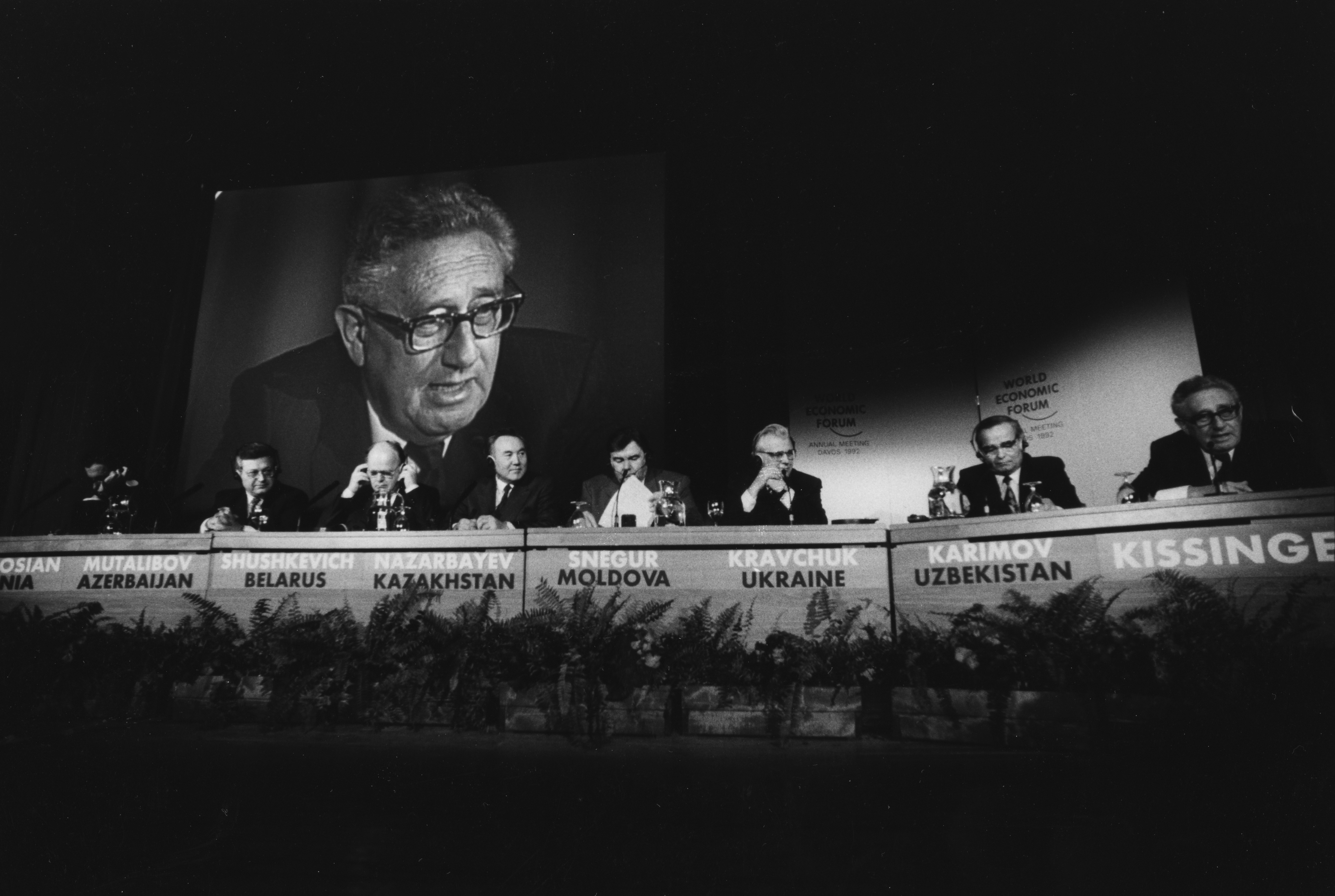
Nazarbayev (three rows from left) at the 1992 World Economic Forum chaired by Henry Kissinger in Davos

Nazarbayev renamed the former State Defense Committees as the Ministry of Defense and appointed Sagadat Nurmagambetov as Defense Minister on 7 May 1992.

The Supreme Soviet, under the leadership of Chairman Serikbolsyn Abdilin, began debating over a draft constitution in June 1992. Opposition political parties Azat, Jeltoqsan and the Republican Party, held demonstrations in Alma-Ata from 10 to 17 June 1992 calling for the formation of a coalition government, resignation of Sergey Tereshchenko's government and the Supreme Soviet which, at that time, was composed of former Communist Party legislators who had yet to stand in an election. The first constitution of Kazakhstan, adopted on 28 January 1993, created a strong executive branch with limited checks on executive power.

On 10 December 1993, the Supreme Soviet voted to dissolve itself and that same day, a presidential decree was signed which set changes in local representative and executive bodies with elections of the mäslihats (local legislatures) taking place every five years and äkims (local heads) being appointed by the president. In March 1994, Kazakhstan for the first time since independence, held a legislative election which was boycotted by the Azat and Jeltoqsan parties. From there, the pro-presidential People's Union of Kazakhstan Unity party won a majority of 30 seats with independent candidates who were on presidential-list won 42 seats. The OSCE observers called the elections unfair, reporting an inflated voter turnout. Nevertheless, the new composition of the Parliament was considered to be "professional" with different various political factions that functioned. In May 1994, the Supreme Council passed a vote of no confidence against Prime Minister Sergey Tereshchenko amidst political scandals evolving Tereshchenko and government ministers. Nazarbayev objected to the change, arguing that the Constitution gave the president the right to appoint the PM with already existing parliamentary confirmation regardless of the motion of confidence. However, he eventually backed down, dismissing Tereshchenko's government in October 1994 and appointing ethnic-Kazakh Akezhan Kazhegeldin as the new PM.

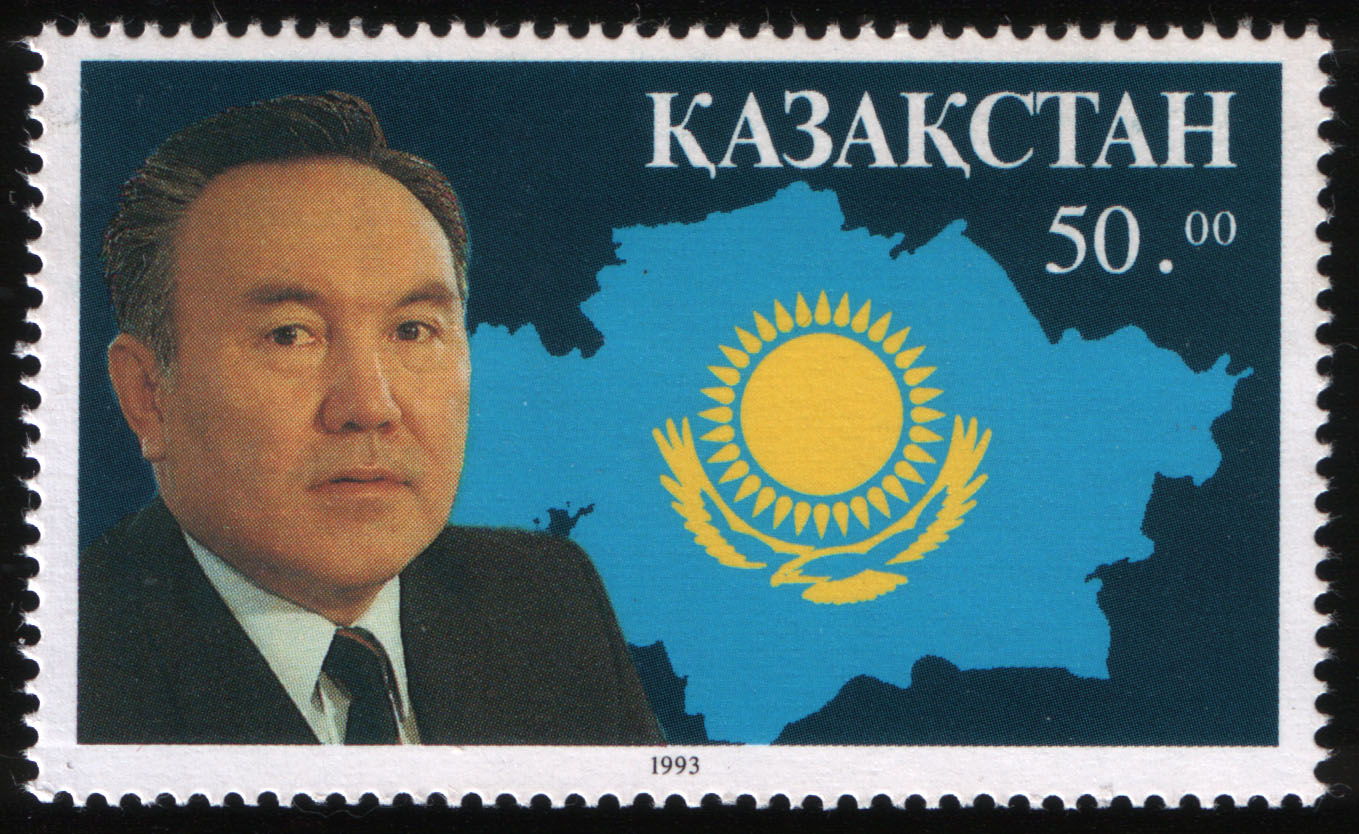
1993 Kazakh postage stamp of Nazarbayev

In 1994, Nazarbayev suggested relocating the capital city from Almaty to Astana, and the official changeover of the capital happened on 10 December 1997.

In March 1995, the Constitutional Court ruled that 1994 legislative elections were held unconstitutionally and as a result, Nazarbayev dissolved the Supreme Council. From that period, all bills were adopted on the basis of presidential decrees such as outlawing any civic participation in an unregistered and/or illegal public association who would be punished with 15-day jail sentence or fines from 5 to 10 times the minimum monthly wage in an effort "to fight organized crime." An April 1995 referendum extended Nazarbayev's term, originally set to end in 1996, to until 2000. In August 1995, a referendum was held which allowed for greater presidential powers and established a bicameral Parliament as well. Both the elections for Mazhilis (lower house) and the Senate (upper house) were held in December 1995 which convened in January 1996. Nazarbayev dismissed the accusations from critics of him personally dissolving the legislature by claiming that it was under Constitutional Court's orders, saying "the law is the law, and the President is obliged to abide by the constitution, otherwise, how will we build a rule-of-law state?" and that the cancellation of the 1996 presidential elections was made by the decision of the Assembly of People of Kazakhstan arguing that "Western schemes do not work in our Eurasian expanses."

In October 1997, Nazarbayev dismissed Prime Minister Akezhan Kazhegeldin from his post, which according to political experts was seen as a "power grab". In his address, he criticized Kazhegeldin over his record reforms and in his place, Nazarbayev appointed Nurlan Balgimbayev, an oil engineer who prior served as an Oil and Gas Minister.

=== 1999–2006: Second term ===
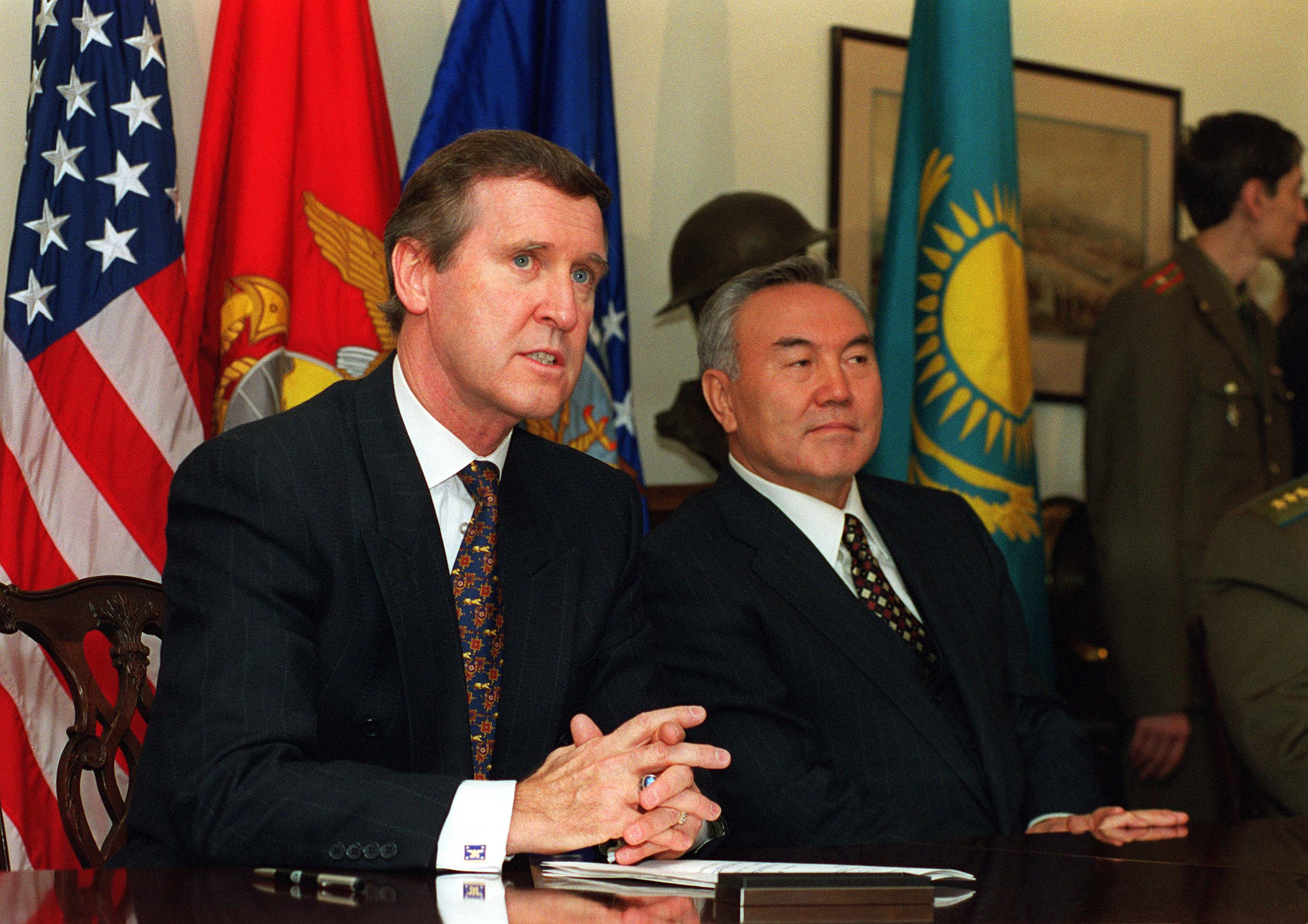
William Cohen and Nazarbayev in November 1997

On 7 October 1998, a number of amendments were made to the Constitution of Kazakhstan in which the term of office of the president was increased from 5 to 7 years as well as term limits. The changes also removed restriction on the maximum required age of a presidential candidate. The following day on 8 October, Nazarbayev signed decree setting the election date for January 1999. He was reelected for second term by winning 81% of the vote in the first round, defeating his main challenger and former Supreme Council chairman Serikbolsyn Abdildin. Abdildin himself in response refused to acknowledge the official results, insisting that they were falsified.

In February 1999, several pro-presidential parties formed into one party named Otan. At the Founding Congress of the party which was held on 1 March 1999, Nazarbayev was elected as the chairman. From there, he suggested that former PM Sergey Tereshchenko should take over the leading role, noting the constitutional limits on president's affiliation with political parties while Nazarbayev himself remained as de facto party leader. In July 1999, Nazarbayev signed decree setting the date for the legislative elections. The Otan, for the first time, participated in the elections, winning 23 seats. In the aftermath on 1 October 1999, Nazarbayev appointed Kassym-Jomart Tokayev as the PM after his predecessor Nurlan Balgimbayev had faced an increasing unpopularity amidst worsening economy and scandal revolving around an arms deal with North Korea.

Nazarbayev appointed Altynbek Sarsenbayev, who at the time served as the minister of culture, information and concord, the secretary of the Security Council, replacing Marat Tazhin, on 4 May 2001. Tazhin became the chairman of the National Security Committee, replacing Alnur Mussayev. Mussayev became the head of the Presidential Security Service.

In January 2002, Prime Minister Kassym-Jomart Tokayev resigned from his post and was subsequently appointed as the minister of foreign affairs and State Secretary. Imangali Tasmagambetov took over Tokayev's role as the new PM which viewed as a response towards a political crisis which occurred following the formation of the Democratic Choice of Kazakhstan in November 2001 by several prominent Kazakh officials who called for political and democratic reforms. Tasmagambetov's government was short-lived, facing opposition by the Parliament over his proposed policies on land privatisation which led to a motion of no confidence against him. Tasmagambetov resigned in June 2003 and Nazarbayev appointed Daniyal Akhmetov to lead the government citing the reason "to intensify the pace of social and economic development."

=== 2006–2011: Third term ===
In June 2000, the Constitutional Council announced its resolution which declared that Nazarbayev's second term was, in fact, his first due to the adaptation of the new Kazakh Constitution which took place in 1995 during Nazarbayev's first term. This allowed him the opportunity to run for another election as his term was set to end in 2007.

On 4 December 2005, new presidential elections were held where Nazarbayev won by an overwhelming majority of 91.15% (from a total of 6,871,571 eligible participating voters) in the first round. Nazarbayev was sworn in for another seven-year term on 11 January 2006.

In 2006, the Otan increased its ranks as all pro-presidential parties began merging into one. Nazarbayev supported the move, stating the need for there to be fewer, but stronger parties that "efficiently defend the interests of the population." In December 2006, the Otan renamed itself into Nur Otan and on 4 July 2007, Nazarbayev was re-elected as the party's chairman.

Amidst the political shakeup, Nazarbayev dismissed Prime Minister Daniyal Akhmetov in January 2007 and appointed Deputy PM Karim Massimov to the post. He stated that Massimov had the "sufficient knowledge and experience" to "develop Kazakhstan's successes."

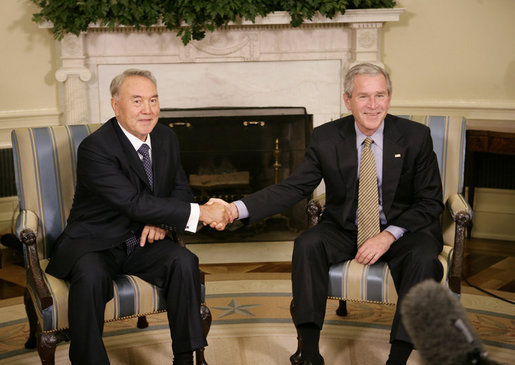
Nazarbayev with U.S. president George W. Bush at the White House in September 2006

On 18 May 2007, the Parliament of Kazakhstan approved a constitutional amendment which allowed the incumbent president—himself—to run for an unlimited number of five-year terms. This amendment applied specifically and only to Nazarbayev: the original constitution's prescribed maximum of two five-year terms will still apply to all future presidents of Kazakhstan. That same year in August, legislative elections were held from which the Nur Otan won all the contested seats in the Mazhilis, eliminating any form of opposition which sparked controversy and criticism from international organizations and groups within the country. In response, Kazakhstan introduced an amendment by allowing for a two-party system since any party that wins second place in race—regardless or not if it passes the 7% electoral threshold—would be guaranteed to have representation in the Parliament.

Nazarbayev has always emphasized the role of education in the nation's social development. In order to make education affordable, on 13 January 2009, he introduced educational grant "Orken" for the talented youth of Kazakhstan. This decree was amended on 23 September 2016.

In 2009, former UK Cabinet Minister Jonathan Aitken released a biography of the Kazakh leader entitled Nazarbayev and the Making of Kazakhstan. The book took a generally pro-Nazarbayev stance, asserting in the introduction that he is mostly responsible for the success of modern Kazakhstan.

=== 2011–2015: Fourth term ===
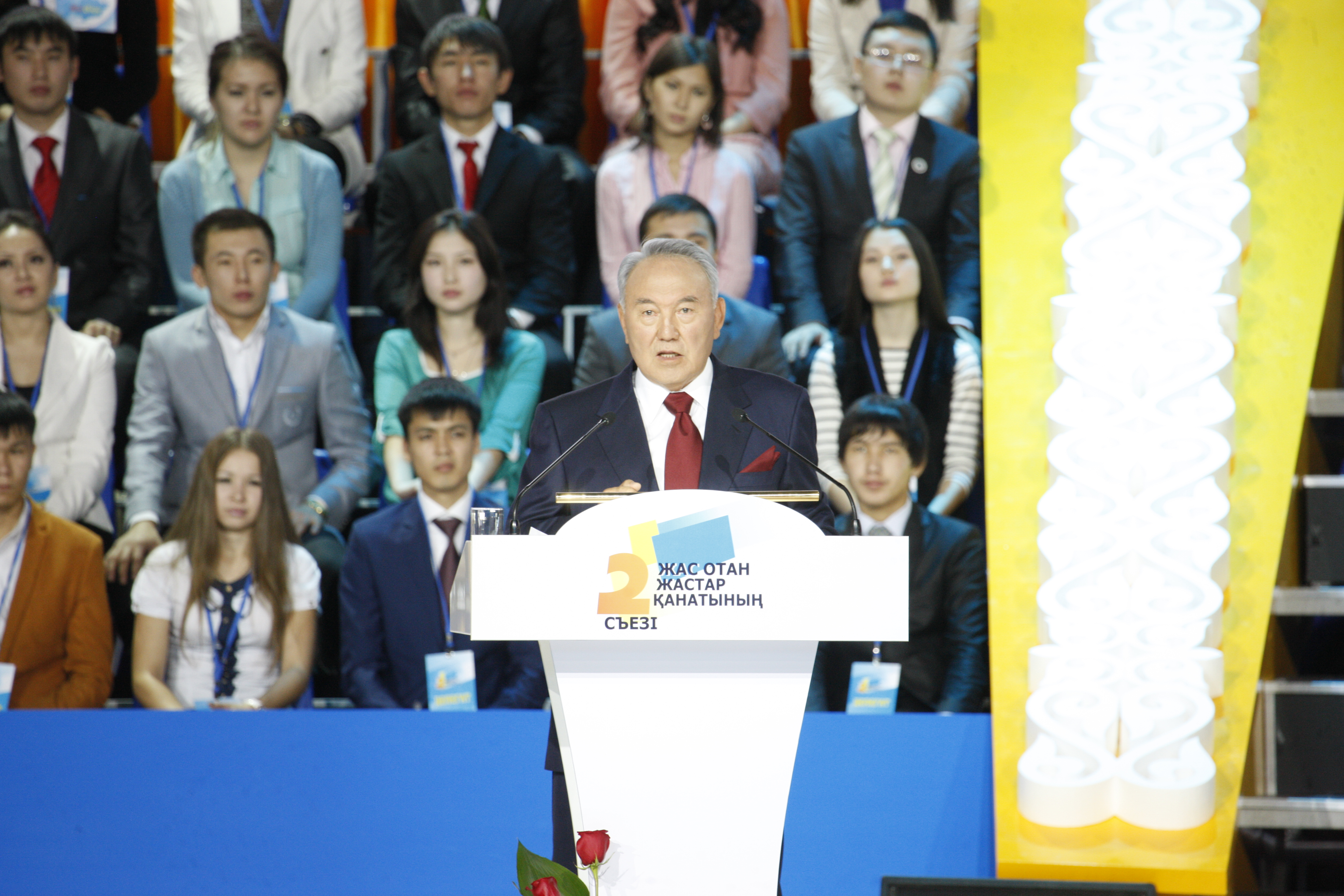
Nazarbayev holding a speech in 2012

In April 2011, Nazarbayev ran for a fourth term, winning 95.5% of the vote during the first round with virtually no opposition candidates. Following his victory, he announced the need in finding an "optimal way of empowering parliament, increasing the government's responsibility and improving the electoral process."

On 11 June 2011, Daniel Witt, Vice Chairman of the Eurasia Foundation, acknowledged the role of Nazarbayev and his political reforms:

"[President] Nazarbayev has led Kazakhstan through difficult times and into an era of prosperity and growth. He has demonstrated that he values his U.S. and Western alliances and is committed to achieving democratic governance."

In December 2011, opponents of Nazarbayev rioted in Mangystau, described by the BBC as the biggest opposition movement of his time in power. On 16 December 2011, demonstrations in the oil town of Zhanaozen clashed with police on the country's Independence Day. Fifteen people were shot dead by security forces and almost 100 people were injured. Protests quickly spread to other cities but then died down. The subsequent trial of demonstrators uncovered mass abuse and torture of detainees.

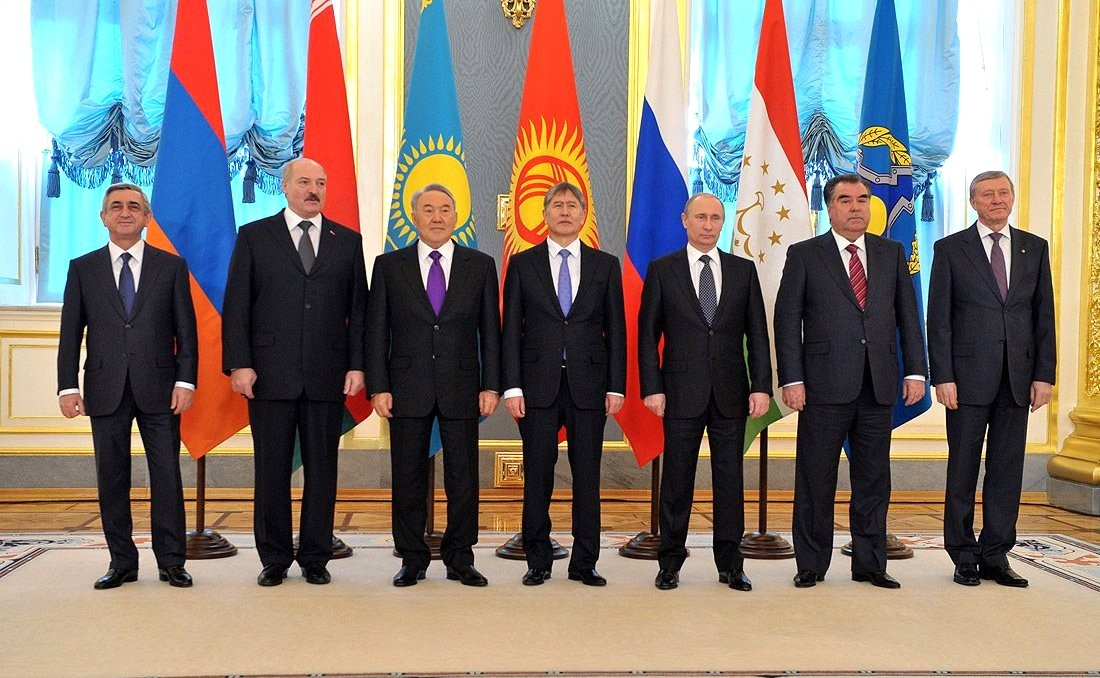
Nazarbayev at the 2012 CSTO meeting in Moscow, Russia

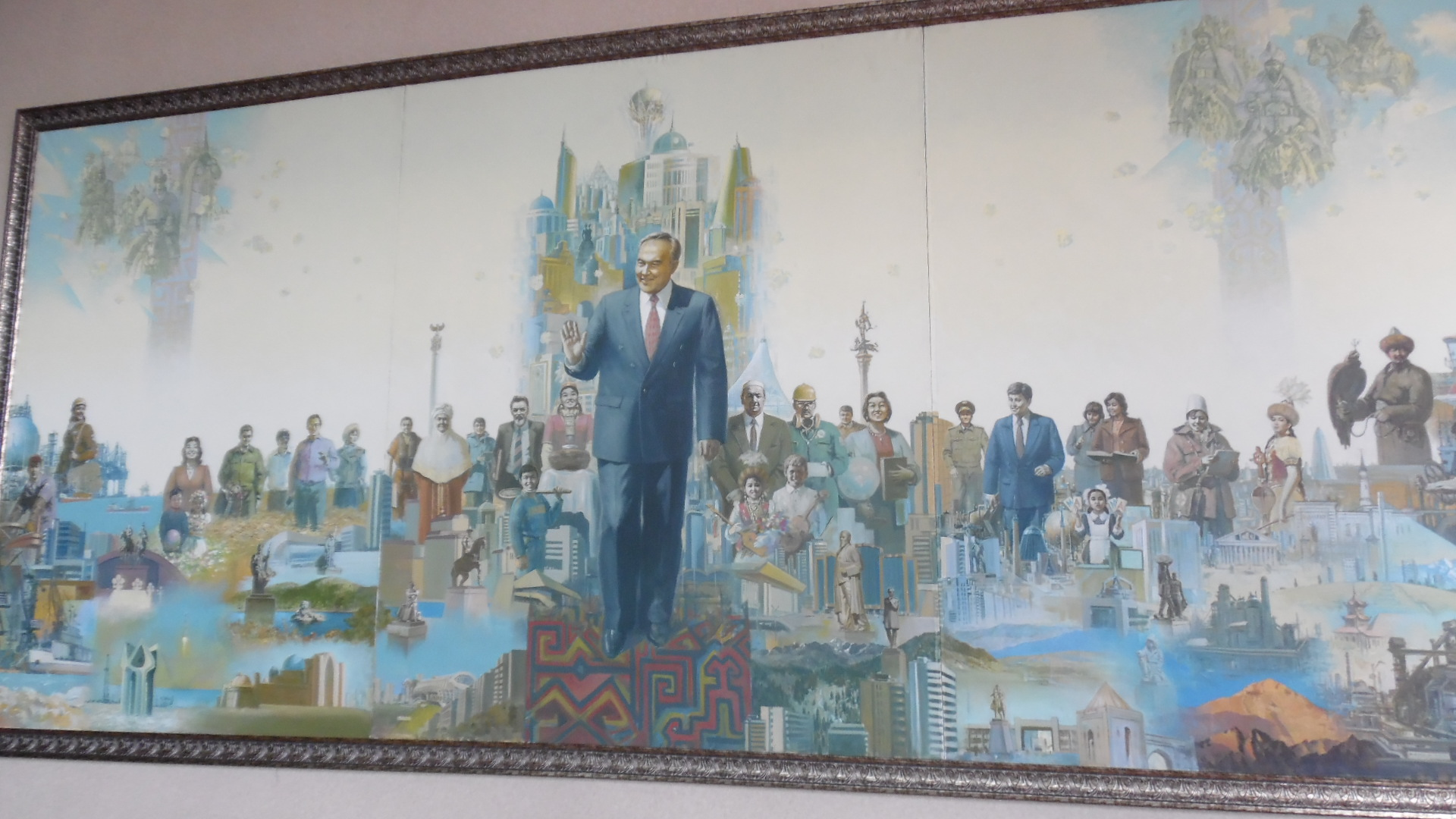
Painting of Elbasy Nursultan Nazarbayev in 2014

On 24 September 2012, Nazarbayev appointed Serik Akhmetov as the PM, a close-ally of Nazarbayev who served as First Deputy PM under Massimov's cabinet and the Äkim of Karaganda Region. Massimov in turn, became the new head of the Presidential Administration.

In December 2012, Nazarbayev outlined a forward-looking national strategy called the Kazakhstan 2050 Strategy.

In 2014, Nazarbayev proposed that Kazakhstan should change its name to "Kazakh Eli" ("Country of the Kazakhs"), for the country to attract better and more foreign investment, since "Kazakhstan" by its name is associated with other "-stan" countries. Nazarbayev suggested Mongolia receives more investment than Kazakhstan because it is not a "-stan" country, even though it is in the same neighborhood, and not as stable as Kazakhstan. However, he noted that decision should be decided by the people on whether the country should change its name.

After Kazakhstan faced an economic downturn of which was caused by low oil prices and devaluation of the tenge, Nazarbayev on 2 April 2014 dismissed PM Serik Akhmetov and reappointed Karim Massimov to the post. Akhmetov subsequently was appointed as a defence minister while Massimov's government was aimed at dealing with the economic crisis.

=== 2015–2019: Fifth and final term ===
Nazarbayev for the last time ran again in the 2015 presidential election for the fifth term. From there, he gathered 97.7% of the vote share in the first round, making it one of the biggest in Kazakhstan's history. In his victory speech, he emphasized the top priority in Nurly Zhol stimulus package that was designed in softening the social blow caused by economic troubles. At a later news conference, Nazarbayev speaking about the electoral results remarked, "I apologize that for superdemocratic states such figures are unacceptable. But I could do nothing. If I had interfered, I would have looked undemocratic, right?" The Organization for Security and Cooperation in Europe criticized the election as falling short of international democratic standards.

In early 2016, it was announced that 1.7 million hectares of agricultural land would be sold at an auction. This sparked rare protests around the country which called for Nazarbayev to stop the momentum on land sales and solve the nation's problems as well. In response to the fears of the lands being sold to foreigners, especially Chinese, Nazarbayev fired back at claims, calling them "groundless" and warned that any provocateur would be punished. On 1 May 2016, at the Kazakhstan People's Unity Day, Nazarbayev warned that without unity and stability, a crisis similarly in Ukraine would happen. In June 2016, armed attacks in Aktobe took place resulting in deaths of 25 people. Nazarbayev called the incident as terrorist attacks which were orchestrated from abroad to destabilize the country similarly in a colour revolution to which he accused of being infiltrated by the ISIS militants.

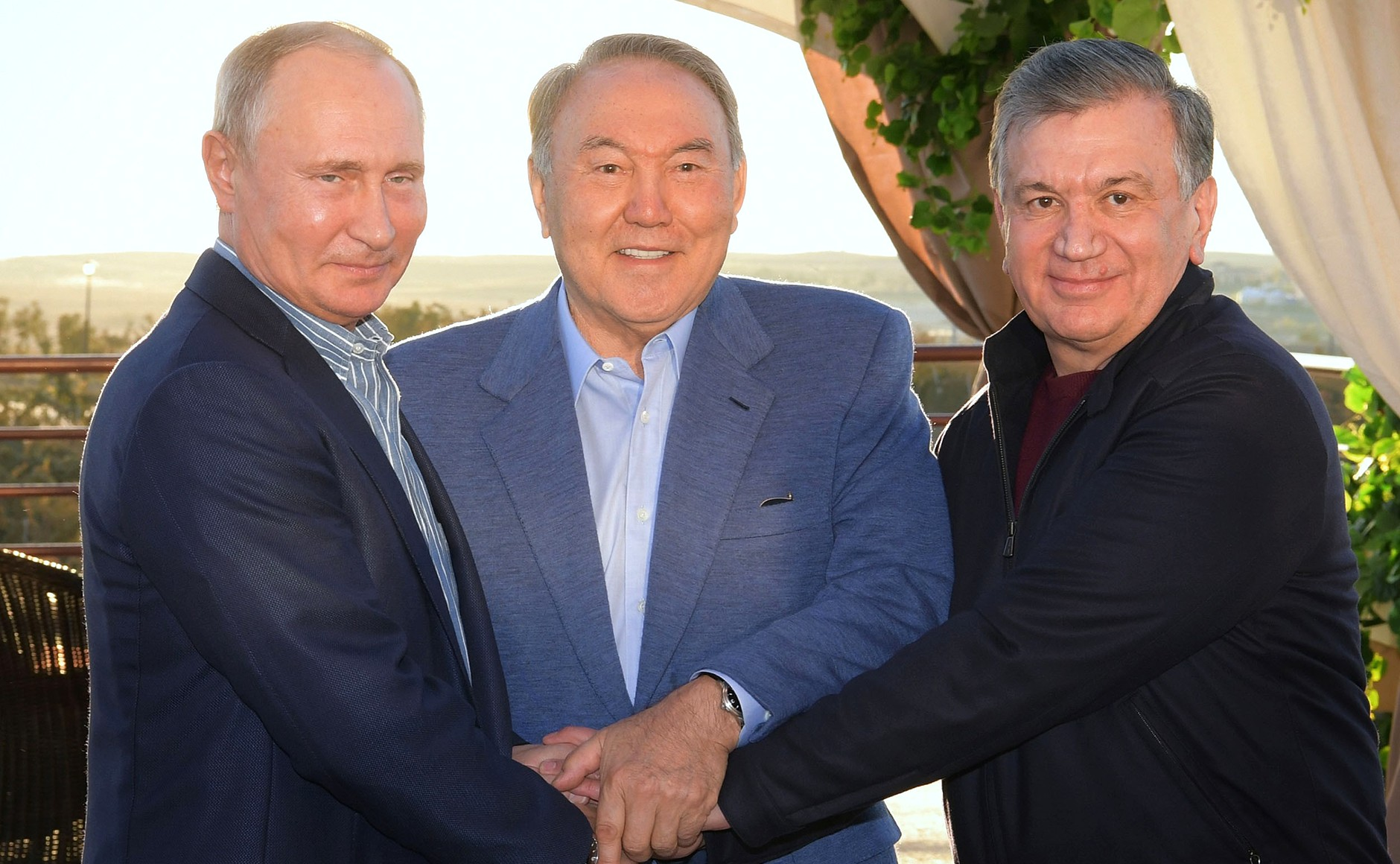
Nazarbayev with Vladimir Putin and Shavkat Mirziyoyev in October 2018

On 8 September 2016, Nazarbayev appointed Karim Massimov as the National Security Committee Chairman and Bakhytzhan Sagintayev to the post of the PM. Days later on 13 September, Nazarbayev's daughter Dariga was appointed as the member of the Senate. This suggested that Nazarbayev was preparing for his succession to be taken over by Dariga as the cabinet reshuffling had occurred after Uzbek president Islam Karimov's death which created political uncertainty in the neighboring country. Nazarbayev dismissed the claims of hereditary succession in an interview to the Bloomberg News in November 2016, saying that the "transfer of power is spelled out by the Constitution."

In January 2017, Nazarbayev proposed constitutional reforms, which would allow for the Parliament to have greater role in decision making, calling it "a consistent and logical step in the development of the state". The Parliament approved several amendments to the Constitution on 5 March 2017, making the president no longer able to override parliamentary votes of no-confidence, while giving the legislative branch to form a government cabinet, implementing state programs and policies. The move was seen as way by Nazarbayev to ensure the potential of a peaceful transfer of power.

Nazarbayev, along with seventeen heads of state and government from around the world, which included Felipe VI of Spain and leaders of the Shanghai Cooperation Organization member countries, consisting of Russia, China, Kazakhstan, Kyrgyzstan, Uzbekistan, Tajikistan, Pakistan and India, attended the opening ceremony of Expo 2017 which was held in Astana. An estimated 3.86 million people visited the site with Nazarbayev at the closing ceremony on 10 September 2017 calling it as "Kazakhstan's most brilliant achievements since its independence."

Senate Chairman Kassym-Jomart Tokayev, in an interview to BBC News in June 2018, suggested that Nazarbayev's term presidential from 2015 was in fact, the last one as he hinted the possibility that Nazarbayev would not run for re-election which was scheduled for 2020. Minister of Information and Communications Dauren Abaev responded to Tokayev's statements claiming that "there's still a lot of time" for Nazarbayev to decide on whether to run for re-election pointing out that the decision will be primarily based on his. He also added that the country would only benefit if Nazarbayev chooses to run for a sixth term.

==== Resignation ====
On 19 March 2019, following unusually persistent protests in cities across the country, Nazarbayev announced his resignation as President of Kazakhstan, citing the need for "a new generation of leaders". The announcement was broadcast in a televised address in Astana after which he signed a decree ending his powers from 20 March 2019. Kassym-Jomart Tokayev, speaker of the upper house of parliament, was appointed as president of the country until the end of the presidential term.

Notwithstanding his resignation as president, he continued to head the ruling Nur Otan party and remained a member of the Constitutional Council. In his televised address Nazarbayev pointed out that he had been granted the honorary status of elbasy (leader of the nation, leader of the people), (Note: Etymology of elbasy: in Turkic languages, 'el'/'il' means 'the people', 'nation', '(home)land', etc., and 'bas'/'bash' means 'head' (both literally and in the meaning of 'leader'). A similar historical title is Ilkhan.) the title bestowed upon him by parliament in 2010. The title was later removed due to the cancellation of the Law on the First President.

Various colleagues of Nazarbayev reacted within hours of the announcement, with Uzbek president Shavkat Mirziyoyev holding a telephone conversation with Nazarbayev, calling him a "great politician". In a cabinet meeting, Russian president Vladimir Putin praised Nazarbayev's leadership, even going as far as to say that the Eurasian Economic Union was Nazarbayev's "brainchild". Other world leaders who sent messages to Nazarbayev included Ilham Aliyev, President of Azerbaijan, Alexander Lukashenko, President of Belarus, and Emomali Rahmon, President of Tajikistan.

According to Nazarbayev himself, he described his intention for stepping down was due to "peak of trust" by the people and that it was "necessary to leave", recalling his memories in attending funerals of Soviet leaders Leonid Brezhnev, Yuri Andropov and Konstantin Chernenko, embarking that "there is still a limit of human capabilities."

=== Allegations of corruption ===
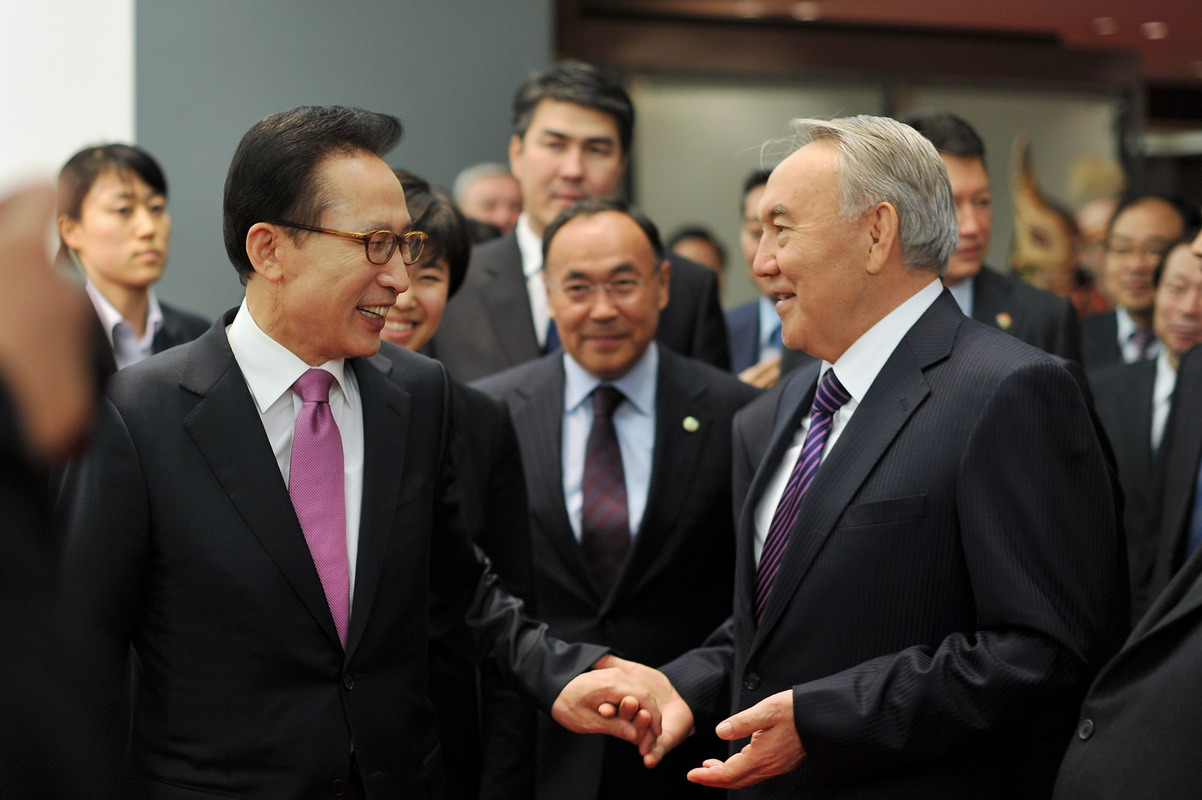
Nazarbayev with Lee Myung-bak in Seoul, 2010

Over the course of Nazarbayev's presidency, an increasing number of accusations of corruption and favoritism were directed against Nazarbayev and his circle. Critics said that the country's government came to resemble a clan system.

According to The New Yorker, in 1999 Swiss banking officials discovered $85 million in an account apparently belonging to Nazarbayev; the money, intended for the Kazakh treasury, had in part been transferred through accounts linked to James Giffen. Subsequently, Nazarbayev successfully pushed for a parliamentary bill granting him legal immunity, as well as another designed to legalise money laundering, angering critics further. When Kazakh opposition newspaper Respublika reported in 2002 that Nazarbayev had in the mid-1990s secretly stashed away $1 billion of state oil revenue in Swiss bank accounts, the decapitated carcass of a dog was left outside the newspaper's offices, with a warning reading "There won't be a next time"; the dog's head later turned up outside editor Irina Petrushova's apartment, with a warning reading "There will be no last time." The newspaper was firebombed as well.

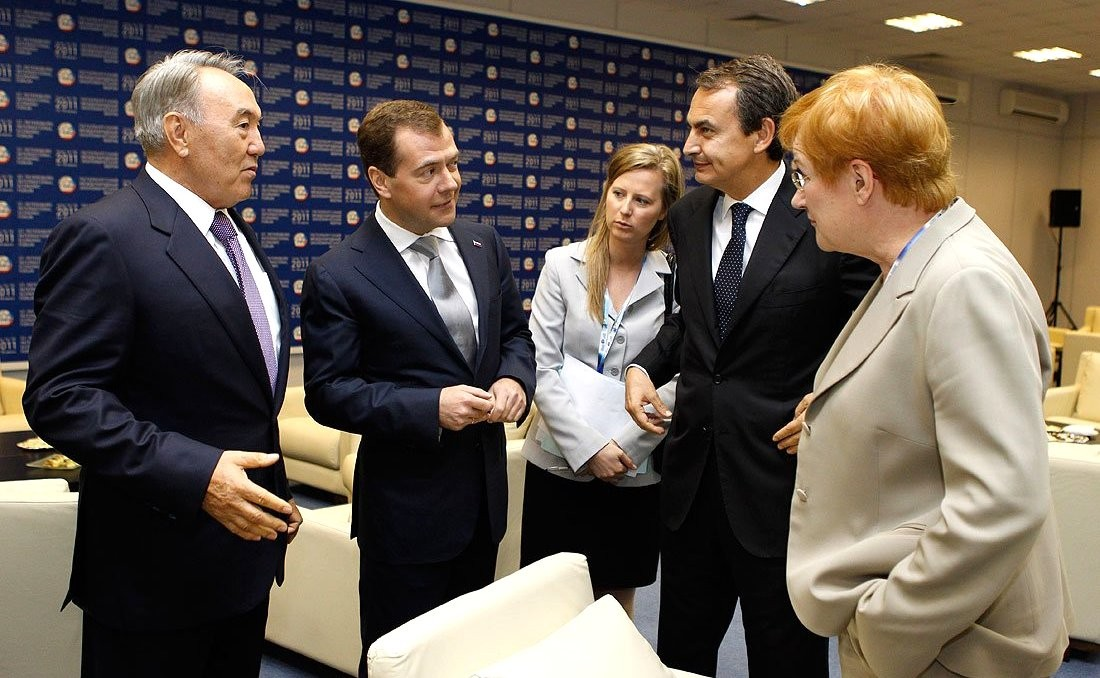
Nazarbayev with President of Russia Dmitry Medvedev, President of Finland Tarja Halonen and Prime Minister of Spain José Luis Rodríguez Zapatero in 2011

In May 2007, the Parliament of Kazakhstan approved a constitutional amendment which would allow Nazarbayev to seek re-election as many times as he wishes. This amendment applies specifically and only to Nazarbayev, since it states that the first president will have no limits on how many times he can run for office, but subsequent presidents will be restricted to a five-year term.

As of 2015, Kazakhstan has never held an election meeting international standards.

In May 2018, the Parliament of Kazakhstan passed a constitutional amendment allowing Nazarbayev to serve as Chairman of the Security Council for life. These reforms, which were approved by the Constitutional Council on 28 June, also expanded the powers of the Security Council, granting it the status of a constitutional body. The amendment states that, "The decisions of the security council and the chairman of the security council are mandatory and are subject to strict execution by state bodies, organisations and officials of the Republic of Kazakhstan."

In December 2020, according to an investigative report by Radio Free Europe/Radio Liberty, it identified at least $785 million in European and U.S. real estate purchases made by Nazarbaev's family members and their in-laws in six countries over a 20-year span. This figure includes a handful of properties that have since been sold, including multimillion-dollar apartments in the United States bought by Nazarbaev's brother, Bolat. It does not include a sprawling Spanish estate owned by Kulibaev, for which a purchase price could not be found.

=== Domestic policy ===
==== Economic issues ====
After the breakup of the Soviet Union, Kazakhstan faced mass unemployment and emigration. Nazarbayev was viewed to have followed Russia's economic reforms starting with price liberalisations. On 3 January 1992, he signed a decree "On measures to liberalise prices", an attempt to stabilise the country's socio-economic situation and form a market economy within Kazakhstan. This resulted in a rapid inflation of goods, causing discontent amongst citizens, thus forcing Nazarbayev on 12 January to sign a "On additional measures for social protection of the population in the context of price liberalisation" which established partial state-regulated prices on bread, bakery products and flour.

Throughout the 1990s, privatisation and banking reforms took place in Kazakhstan. In June 1994, Nazarbayev amended the Parliament's Economic Memorandum for the next three years, which has been defined as an economic strategy. It included strict measures to reform the economy and establish macroeconomic stability and set the task of carrying out rapid and vigorous privatization. During the introduction of the National Bank of Kazakhstan in December 1993, significant changes were made in which all specialized banks were transformed into a joint stock company, and the National Bank was granted a number of powers. In March 1995, Nazarbayev signed decree setting the National Bank as an independent entity that is accountable only for the head of state.

Kazakhstan managed to avoid full impact from the 1997 Asian financial crisis and 1998 Russian financial crisis, due to lack of high liquid investments. Nazarbayev pledged for to continue in advancing for an "independent, open and free market economy." Starting from early 2000's, the Kazakh economy faced huge growth thanks to its development in energy sector and high oil prices. Nazarbayev published his manifesto: Prosperity, Security and the Ever-Growing Welfare of all Kazakhstanis in 2000, where he wrote that "today we are building a new state, a new market economy and a new democracy, and this—at the very time when many other independent states have already trodden that path similar enough."

In October 2008, during the 2008 financial crisis, Nazarbayev assured the nation that it would deal with the crisis by introducing a rescue package amounted to 10% of the country's GDP, of which was funded thanks in part to the national sovereign wealth fund. In his state of address on 6 March 2009, he announced 350,000 jobs for workers in the spheres of infrastructure projects as well as the creation of the Eurasian Land Bridge.

Since 2014, Nazarbayev has set strategic priority in Kazakhstan for economic diversification which would maintain the country's stability by avoiding the effects from its oil export reliance that would affect the economy through its constant price downfalls.

===== Eurasian Economic Union =====
The signing ceremony of the Treaty on the Eurasian Economic Union (in Astana, Kazakhstan, on 29 May 2014)

In 1994, Nazarbayev suggested the idea of creating a "Eurasian Union" during a speech at Moscow State University. On 29 May 2014, alongside Russian president Vladimir Putin and Belarusian president Aleksandr Lukashenko, Nazarbayev signed the founding treaty of the Eurasian Union (EEU) in Astana, paving the way for the transition from their current customs union to the full-fledged EEU on 1 January 2015. Nazarbayev named Honorary Chairman of Supreme Eurasian Economic Council in May 2019.

===== Kazakhstan 2050 Strategy =====
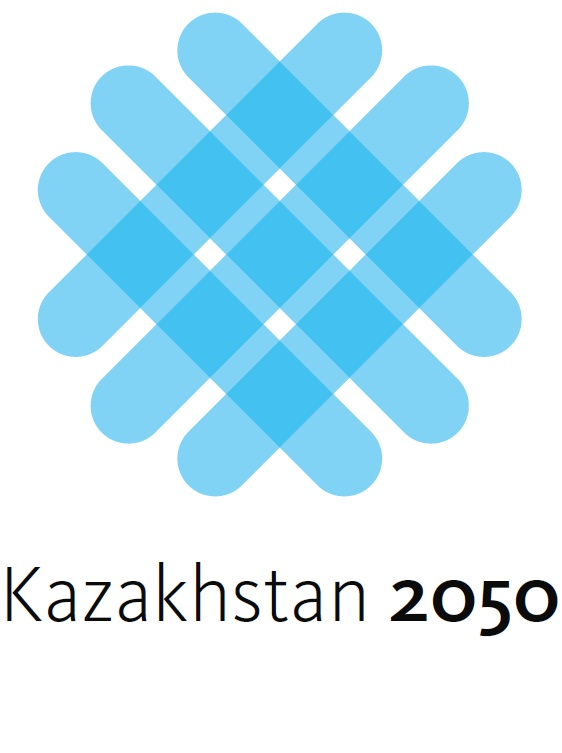
Kazakhstan 2050 Strategy logo

Nazarbayev unveiled in his 2012 State of the Nation the Kazakhstan 2050 Strategy, a long-term strategy to ensure future growth prospects of Kazakhstan, and position Kazakhstan as one of the top 30 most developed nations in the world.

===== Nurly Zhol =====
President Nazarbayev unveiled in 2014 a multibillion-dollar domestic modernization and reformation plan called Nurly Zhol – The Path to the Future. It was officially approved by the decree of the president on 6 April 2015. The goal of the plan was for development and improvement of tourist, industrial and housing infrastructure, create 395,500 new jobs, and increase the GDP growth rate 15.7 by 2019.

In March 2019, it was announced that the program would be extended to 2025 with its new agenda being focused on developing road infrastructure. According to Minister of Infrastructure and Development Beibut Atamkulov, it is planned that 27,000 kilometres of local roads will be repaired, with 21,000 kilometres of national roads being reconstructed and repaired.

===== Digital Kazakhstan =====
President Nazarbayev unveiled this technological modernization initiative to increase Kazakhstan's economic competitiveness through the digital ecosystem development.

=== Environmental issues ===
In his 1998 autobiography, Nazarbayev wrote that "The shrinking of the Aral Sea, because of its scope, is one of the most serious ecological disasters being faced by our planet today. It is not an exaggeration to put it on the same level as the destruction of the Amazon rainforest." He called on Uzbekistan, Turkmenistan, Tajikistan, Kyrgyzstan, and the wider world to do more to reverse the environmental damage done during the Soviet era.

=== Nuclear disarmament ===
Kazakhstan inherited from the Soviet Union the world's fourth-largest stockpile of nuclear weapons. Within four years of independence, Kazakhstan possessed zero nuclear weapons. In one of the new government's first major decisions, Nazarbayev closed the Soviet nuclear test site at Semipalatinsk (Semei), where 456 nuclear tests had been conducted by the Soviet military.

During the Soviet era, over 500 military experiments with nuclear weapons were conducted by scientists in the Kazakhstan region, mostly at the Semipalatinsk Test Site, causing radiation sickness and birth defects. As the influence of the Soviet Union waned, Nazarbayev closed the site. He later claimed that he had encouraged Olzhas Suleimenov's anti-nuclear movement in Kazakhstan, and was always fully committed to the group's goals. In what was dubbed "Project Sapphire", the Kazakhstan and United States governments worked closely together to dismantle former Soviet weapons stored in the country, with the Americans agreeing to fund over $800 million in transportation and "compensation" costs.

Nazarbayev encouraged the United Nations General Assembly to establish 29 August as the International Day Against Nuclear Tests. In his article he has proposed a new Non-Proliferation Treaty "that would guarantee clear obligations on the part of signatory governments and define real sanctions for those who fail to observe the terms of the agreement." His foreign minister signed a treaty authorizing the Central Asian Nuclear Weapon Free Zone on 8 September 2006.

In an oped in The Washington Times, Nazarbayev called for the Nuclear Non-proliferation Treaty to be modernized and better balanced.

In March 2016, Nazarbayev released his "Manifesto: The World. The 21st century." In this manifest he called for expanding and replicating existing nuclear weapon-free zones and stressed the need to modernise existing international disarmament treaties.

=== Religion ===
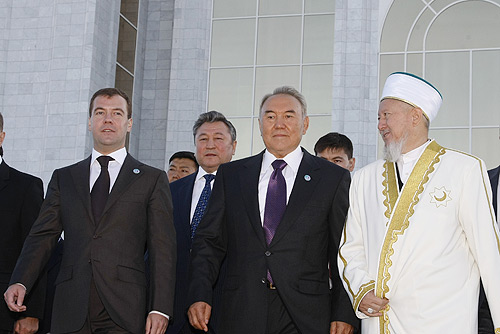
During a visit to the central mosque of the Aktobe Region, 2008

Nazarbayev put forward the initiative of holding a forum of world and traditional religions in Astana. Earlier the organisers of similar events were only representatives of leading religions and denominations. Among other similar events aimed at establishing interdenominational dialogue were the meetings of representatives of world religions and denominations held in Assisi, Italy, in October 1986 and January 2002. The first Congress of World and Traditional Religions which gathered in 2003 allowed the leaders of all major religions to develop prospects for mutual cooperation.

Nazarbayev initially espoused anti-religious views during the Soviet era; he later made attempts to support Muslim heritage by performing the Hajj pilgrimage, and supporting mosque renovations.

Under the leadership of Nazarbayev, Kazakhstan enacted some degrees of multiculturalism in order to retain and attract talents from diverse ethnic groups among its citizenry, and even from nations that are developing ties of cooperation with the country, in order to coordinate human resources onto the state-guided path of global market economic participation. This principle of the Kazakh leadership has earned it the name "Singapore of the Steppes".

However, in 2012, Nazarbayev proposed reforms, which were later enacted by the parliament, imposing stringent restrictions on religious practices. Religious groups were required to re-register, or face closure. The initiative was explained as an attempt to combat extremism. However, under the new law, many minority religious groups are deemed illegal. In order to exist on a local level, a group must have more than 50 members: more than 500 on a regional level, and more than 5,000 on the national level.

=== Nationalism ===
In 2014, Vladimir Putin's remarks regarding the historicity of Kazakhstan, in which he stated that Nazarbayev "created a state on a territory that never had a state ... Kazakhs never had any statehood, he has created it" led to a severe response from Nazarbayev. Four years later, in February 2018, Reuters reported that "Kazakhstan further loosened cultural ties with its former political masters in Moscow ... when a ban on speaking Russian in cabinet meetings took effect ... [Nazarbayev] has also ordered all parliamentary hearings to be held in Kazakh, saying those who are not fluent must be provided with simultaneous translations."

=== Human rights record ===
Kazakhstan's human rights situation under Nazarbayev is uniformly described as poor by independent observers. Human Rights Watch says that "Kazakhstan heavily restricts freedom of assembly, speech, and religion. In 2014, authorities closed newspapers, jailed or fined dozens of people after peaceful but unsanctioned protests, and fined or detained worshippers for practicing religion outside state controls. Government critics, including opposition leader Vladimir Kozlov, remained in detention after unfair trials. In mid-2014, Kazakhstan adopted new criminal, criminal executive, criminal procedural, and administrative codes, and a new law on trade unions, which contain articles restricting fundamental freedoms and are incompatible with international standards. Torture remains common in places of detention."

Kazakhstan is ranked 161 out of 180 countries on the World Press Freedom Index, compiled by Reporters Without Borders.

=== Rule of law ===
According to a US government report released in 2014, in Kazakhstan:

The law does not require police to inform detainees that they have the right to an attorney, and police did not do so. Human rights observers alleged that law enforcement officials dissuaded detainees from seeing an attorney, gathered evidence through preliminary questioning before a detainee’s attorney arrived, and in some cases used corrupt defense attorneys to gather evidence. [...] The law does not adequately provide for an independent judiciary. The executive branch sharply limited judicial independence. Prosecutors enjoyed a quasi-judicial role and had the authority to suspend court decisions. Corruption was evident at every stage of the judicial process. Although judges were among the most highly paid government employees, lawyers and human rights monitors alleged that judges, prosecutors, and other officials solicited bribes in exchange for favorable rulings in the majority of criminal cases.

Kazakhstan's global rank in the World Justice Project's 2015 Rule of Law Index was 65 out of 102; the country scored well on "Order and Security" (global rank 32/102), and poorly on "Constraints on Government Powers" (global rank 93/102), "Open Government" (85/102) and "Fundamental Rights" (84/102, with a downward trend marking a deterioration in conditions). Kazakhstan's global rank in the World Justice Project's 2020 Rule of Law Index rose and was 62 out 128. Its global rank on "Order and Security" remained high (39/128) and low on "Constraints on Government Powers" (102/128), "Open Government" (81/128) and "Fundamental Rights" (100/128).

The 100 Concrete Steps national plan introduced by President Nazarbayev included measures to reform the court system of Kazakhstan, including the introduction of mandatory jury trials for certain categories of crimes (Step 21) and the creation of local police service (Step 30). The implementation of the national plan resulted in Kazakhstan's transition from a five-tier judicial system to a three-tier one in early 2016 yet it severely restricted access to the cassation review of cases by the Supreme Court. However, the expansion of jury trials has not been implemented. Furthermore, Nazarbayev abolished the local police service in 2018 following the public outrage over the murder of Denis Ten in downtown Almaty.

=== Foreign policy ===
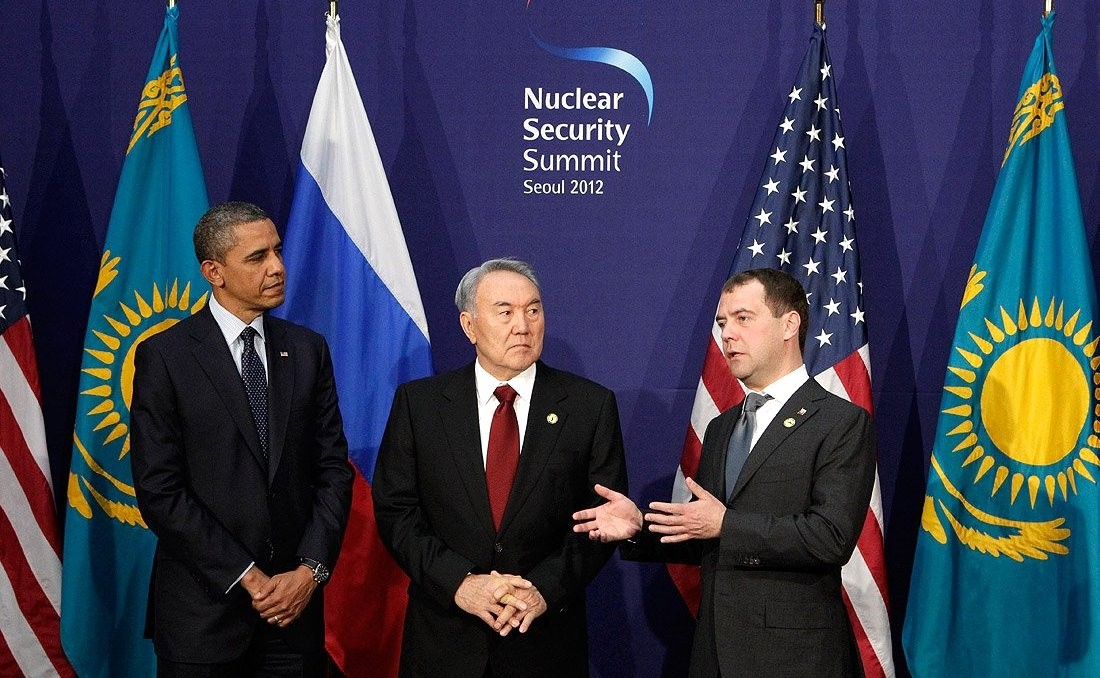
Nazarbayev (center) at the 2012 Nuclear Security Summit with U.S. president Barack Obama (left) and Russian president Dmitry Medvedev (right)

During Nazarbayev's presidency the main principle of Kazakhstan's international relations was multi-vector foreign policy, which was based on initiatives to establish friendly relations with foreign partners. His government's policies were considered moderate by maintaining a balance between the world powers of United States and Russia.

From 1990 to 1994, Nazarbayev paid official visits to the United States, United Kingdom, China, Germany, Russia, Turkey, Japan and other nations. By 1996, 120 nations had recognized Kazakhstan, and it had established diplomatic relations with 92 countries. The first major diplomatic initiatives by Nazarbayev were dealing with strategic issues, such as obtaining international security guarantees in the aftermath of nuclear disarmament as a result of pressure from Western nations. Nazarbayev called on Russia, the United States, and China to conclude a non-aggression pact with Kazakhstan that would also guarantee the country's sovereignty. On 5 December 1994, Russia, U.S., and U.K. signed the Budapest Memorandum on Security Assurances to Kazakhstan based on the Non-Proliferation Treaty (NPT). Later, the governments of China and France added their signatures to the Memorandum.

Kazakhstan under Nazarbayev became co-founders of the Shanghai Cooperation Organisation in 2001.

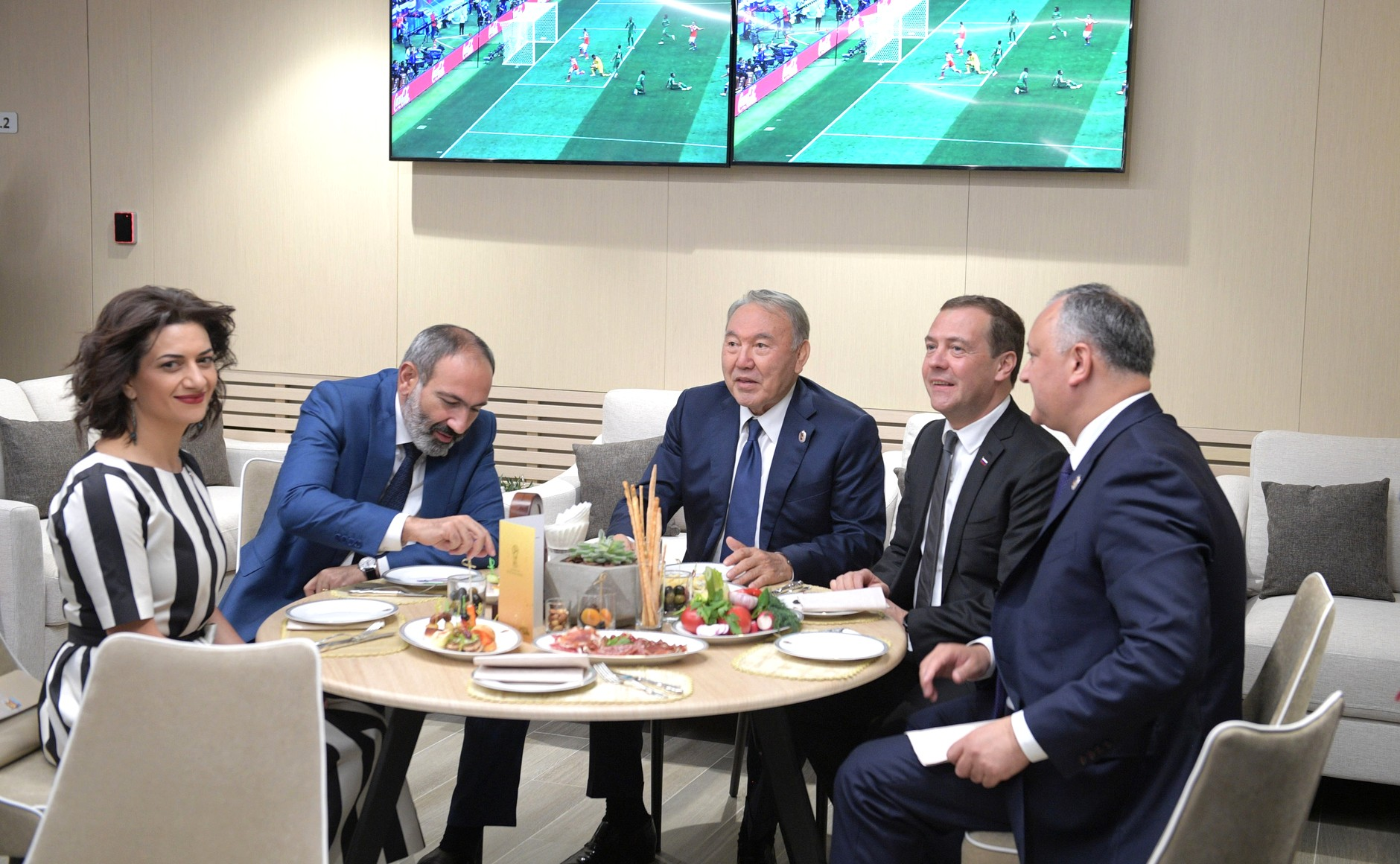
Nazarbayev with Nikol Pashinyan, Anna Hakobyan, Igor Dodon and Dmitry Medvedev at the FIFA World Cup in Russia, 2018

In January 2019, Zimbabwean President Emmerson Mnangagwa conducted a state visit to Astana to meet with Nazarbayev, in the first visit by an African leader to the country in years. This would be the last foreign head of state that Nazarbayev would receive while in office. Nazarbayev's last state visit to a foreign country took place five days prior to his resignation, visiting the United Arab Emirates to meet Crown Prince Mohammed bin Zayed.

==== China ====
Nazarbayev prioritized strengthening relations with China through a pragmatic approach focused on economic cooperation, regional security, and border stability. Kazakhstan resolved longstanding border disputes with China through agreements in 1994, 1997, and 2002, finalizing their 1,700-kilometer boundary.

He played a central role in founding the Shanghai Cooperation Organisation (SCO) in 2001, deepening regional cooperation with China on security and trade. Economic ties grew substantially during his presidency, with China becoming a major trading partner and investor.

Energy and infrastructure cooperation were key pillars of the bilateral relationship. In 2006, Kazakhstan and China completed the first stage of the Kazakhstan–China oil pipeline, the first direct pipeline between China and a foreign country. This was followed by the Central Asia–China gas pipeline, launched in 2009, linking gas fields in Turkmenistan through Uzbekistan and Kazakhstan into western China. Nazarbayev also supported Chinese president Xi Jinping's Belt and Road Initiative (BRI) proposal in 2013, which he aligned with Kazakhstan's domestic Nurly Zhol infrastructure program beginning in 2014. This coordination facilitated large-scale Chinese investments in transport corridors, logistics centers, and industrial zones across Kazakhstan, further embedding the country in transcontinental trade routes.

Despite close ties with China, Nazarbayev's government remained discreet about the Xinjiang re-education camps and persecution of Uyghurs in China. As international concern grew in the late 2010s, Kazakhstan faced domestic pressure and consular issues but opted not to publicly criticize Beijing.

==== Iran ====
In a speech given in December 2006 marking the fifteenth anniversary of Kazakhstan's independence, Nazarbayev stated he wished to join with Iran in support of a single currency for all Central Asian states and intended to push the idea forward with the president of Iran, Mahmoud Ahmadinejad, on an upcoming visit. In one of his speeches however, Nazarbayev criticised Iran as one of the countries that provides support for terrorism. The Kazakh Foreign Ministry however, released a statement on 19 December, saying his remarks were not "what he really meant," and his comments were "mistakes."

During an announcement of a railway link in 2007, Nazarbayev expressed a religious solidarity with Iran, as he was quoted as saying, "Today I will pay a visit to Turkmenistan where we will agree on the construction of a railway through Kazakhstan and Turkmenistan to Iran with access to the Persian Gulf. This will bring us closer to our Muslim brothers."

==== Israel ====
Notwithstanding Kazakhstan's membership in the Organisation of the Islamic Conference (now the Organisation of Islamic Cooperation), under Nazarbayev, Kazakhstan had good relations with Israel. Diplomatic relations were established in 1992 and Nazarbayev paid official visits to Israel in 1995 and 2000. Bilateral trade between the two countries amounted to $724 million in 2005.

Israeli prime minister Benjamin Netanyahu conducted his first ever visit to Kazakhstan in mid-December 2016, when he met with Nazarbayev. The two countries signed agreements on research and development, aviation, civil service commissions and agricultural cooperation, as well as a declaration on establishing an agricultural consortium.

==== Russia ====
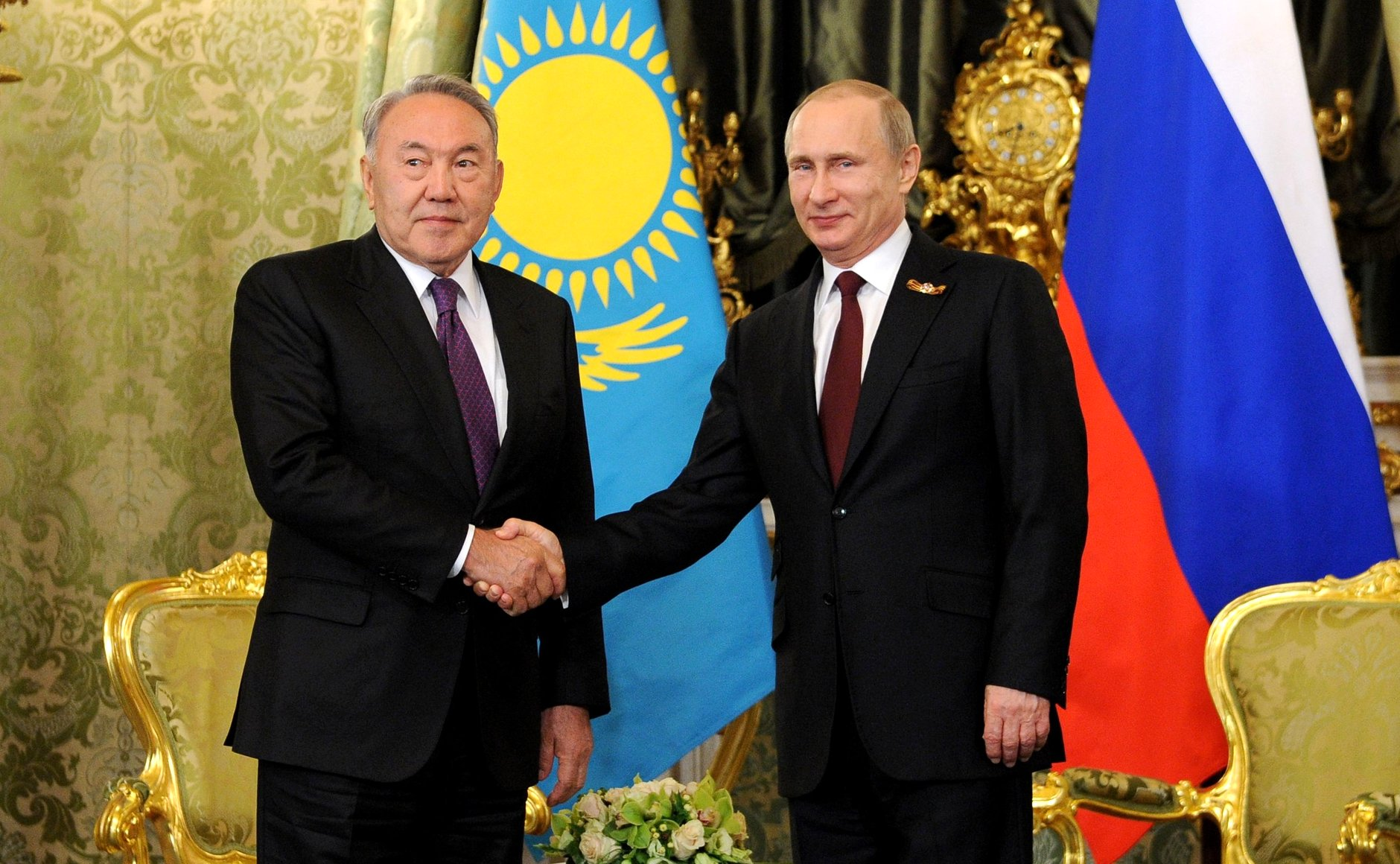
Nazarbayev with Russian president Vladimir Putin in Kremlin, May 2015

Kazakhstan maintained close and multifaceted relations with Russia, grounded in shared history, culture, and economic ties as neighboring former Soviet republics. Both countries were founding members of the Commonwealth of Independent States (CIS) in 1991, which aimed to facilitate political, economic, and security cooperation among post-Soviet states. This partnership further deepened with Kazakhstan's participation in the Eurasian Economic Union (EAEU) from 2015, promoting economic integration and free movement within the region. Security collaboration was conducted through frameworks like the Russian-led Collective Security Treaty Organization (CSTO), addressing regional stability and counterterrorism.

Nazarbayev pursued a multi-vector foreign policy, balancing Kazakhstan's relations with Russia through high-level meetings with Russian leaders—including Boris Yeltsin, Vladimir Putin, and Dmitry Medvedev. Cooperation with Russia focused on trade, energy, security, and border management.

Energy cooperation was a key aspect of the relationship. Kazakhstan's oil and natural gas exports relied heavily on routes passing through Russia, such as those of the Caspian Pipeline Consortium. While the energy partnership was generally stable, disputes occasionally arose over tariffs and transit terms, prompting Kazakhstan to explore alternative export routes and support the Baku–Tbilisi–Ceyhan pipeline.

Amid Russia's growing geopolitical assertiveness, including the Russo-Georgian War, the 2014 annexation of Crimea and conflict in eastern Ukraine, and military involvement in the Syrian civil war, Nazarbayev consistently emphasized adherence to international law, sovereignty, and territorial integrity, seeking to preserve Kazakhstan's strategic partnership with Moscow while avoiding entanglement in regional conflicts.

==== United States ====
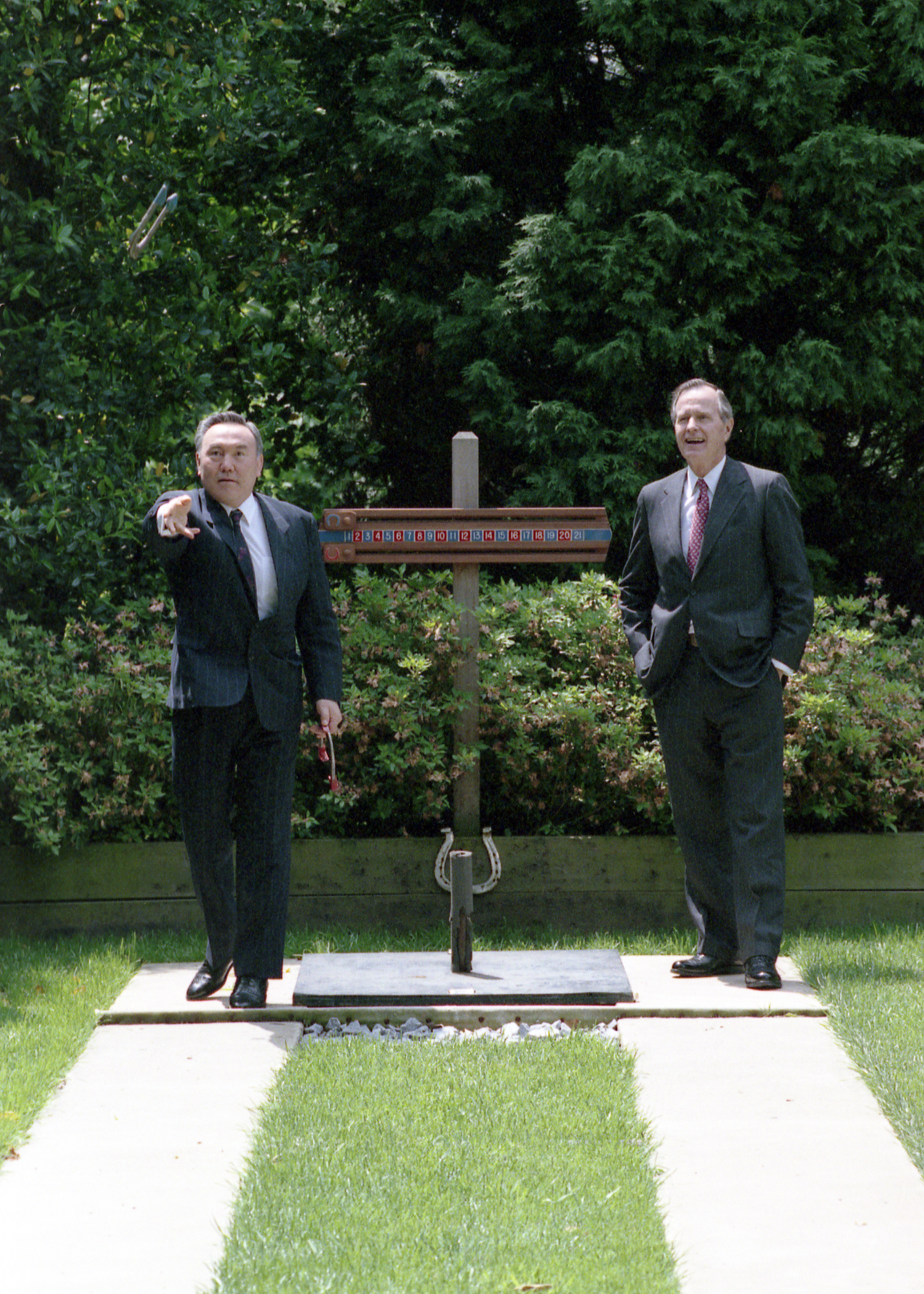
Nazarbayev and U.S. president George H. W. Bush pitching horseshoes at the White House, May 1992

The United States was among the first countries to recognize Kazakhstan's independence in December 1991, providing important diplomatic support during the nation's early years. In May 1992, Nazarbayev made his first state visit to the United States, meeting with President George H. W. Bush. During this visit, the leaders expressed a commitment to developing friendly and cooperative relations. Nazarbayev also signed a landmark agreement with Chevron to develop the Tengiz oil field, signaling the start of major American investment in Kazakhstan's energy sector.

A central aspect of U.S.–Kazakhstan relations during Nazarbayev’s presidency was Kazakhstan's decision to voluntarily renounce the nuclear weapons it inherited from the Soviet Union. Nazarbayev's government closed the Semipalatinsk Test Site and worked closely with the United States under the Cooperative Threat Reduction program to dismantle weapons of mass destruction and related infrastructure. Kazakhstan's role in global nuclear nonproliferation was further highlighted by its hosting of the International Atomic Energy Agency's Low-Enriched Uranium Bank, designed to promote peaceful nuclear energy.

Throughout his tenure, Nazarbayev met with several US diplomats and presidents, including Bill Clinton, George W. Bush, Barack Obama, and Donald Trump. These meetings served to strengthen cooperation on energy development, regional security, counterterrorism, and nuclear nonproliferation. Under Nazarbayev's leadership, Kazakhstan and the United States established a strategic partnership that contributed to regional stability and addressed shared security concerns.

==== Turkey ====
Kazakhstan established early and enduring diplomatic ties with Turkey. In March 1991, Turkish president Turgut Özal became the first foreign head of state to visit Kazakhstan, signing foundational cooperation agreements. Turkey promptly recognized Kazakhstan's independence that year, and diplomatic relations were formally established on 2 March 1992. Later that year, Nazarbayev made his inaugural state visit to Ankara, commemorating the opening of Kazakh embassy and deepening bilateral engagement.

During his presidency, Nazarbayev prioritized Turkey as a key partner, driven by shared Turkic heritage and strategic interests. One of the earliest symbols of this partnership was the transformation of Turkistan State University into the Khoja Akhmet Yassawi International Kazakh–Turkish University in 1991, formally established by bilateral agreement in October 1992. Educational ties expanded further through the opening of dozens of Kazakh–Turkish lyceums across Kazakhstan, supported by the Kazakh–Turkish Education Foundation, and through scholarship programs that enabled thousands of Kazakh students to study in Turkey.

During his presidency, Nazarbayev prioritized Turkey as a key partner, driven by shared Turkic heritage and strategic interests. Significant milestones included a Strategic Partnership Agreement in 2009, which expanded collaboration in energy, infrastructure, education, and defense. Economically, the "New Synergy" initiative aimed to raise bilateral trade from around US $3.3 billion in 2011 toward US $10 billion by 2015, and Turkish investors played a growing role in Kazakh infrastructure and energy projects. Nazarbayev also incorporated Turkey into his Nurly Zhol economic corridor strategy to strengthen transport links between Europe and Central Asia.

== Post-presidency ==
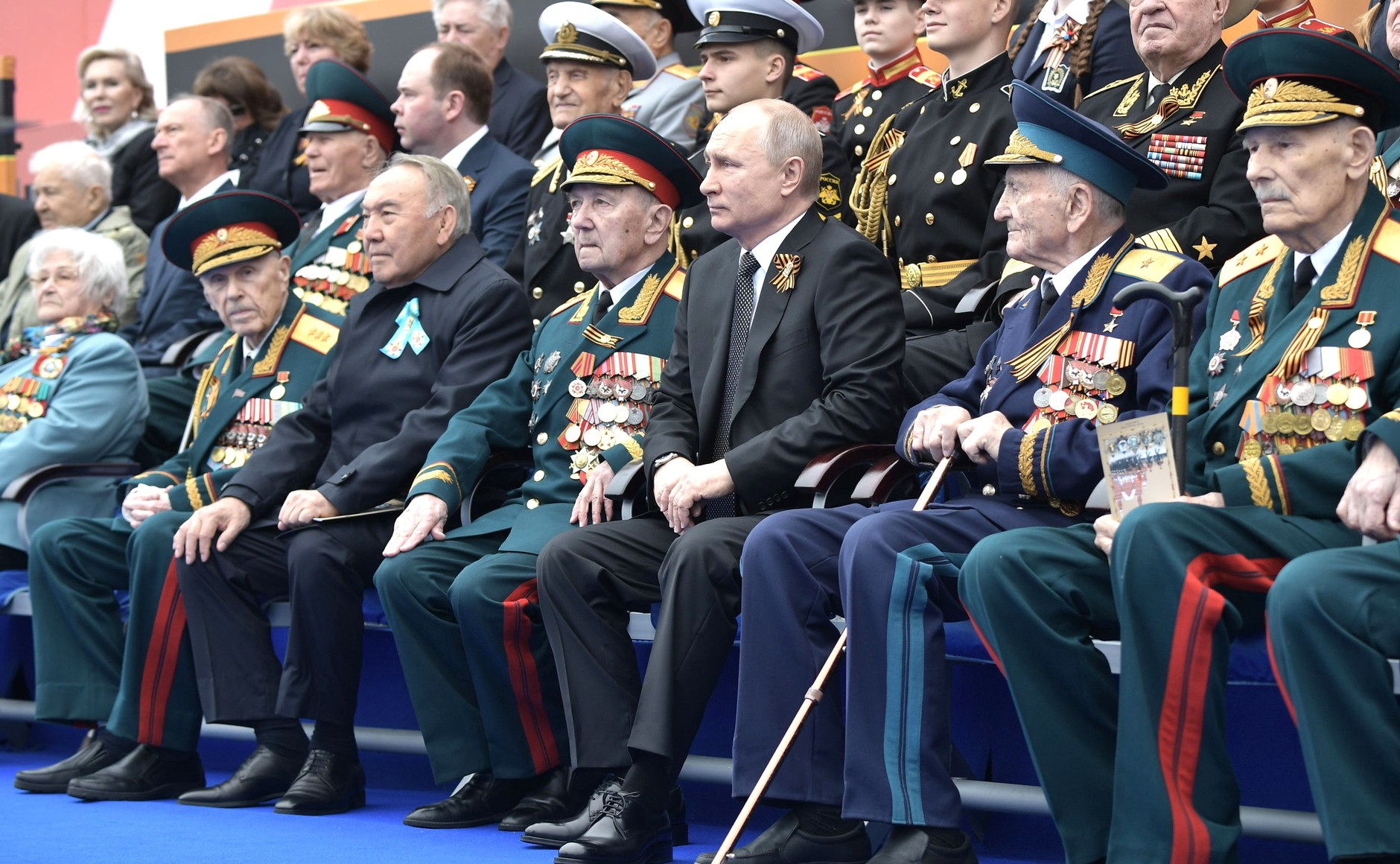
Nazarbayev (third from the left) with Vladimir Putin at the 2019 Moscow Victory Day Parade

According to The Economist, despite his resignation, he was still behind the leadership of the country. His resignation is considered by The Moscow Times to be an attempt to turn him into a Lee Kuan Yew type of public figure. In the month since his resignation, he had met with South Korean president Moon Jae-in and Hungarian prime minister Viktor Orbán during their visit to Kazakhstan. Notably, their meetings with Nazarbayev took place separately from their meetings with President Tokayev, who is the de jure head of state. Two days after leaving office, he attended the Nauryz celebrations where he was greeted by the civilian population. In regard to accommodations as the first president, it is known that his personal office (now known as Kökorda) has been moved to a different location in the capital from the presidential palace. It was also reported in late April 2019 that Nazarbayev also maintains a private jet for official and private visits.

He has embarked on two foreign visits since leaving office, to Beijing and Moscow. The former visit took place during the second Belt and Road Forum while the latter took place during the 2019 Moscow Victory Day Parade. In late-May, Turkish Foreign Minister Mevlüt Çavuşoğlu announced the naming of Nazarbayev as the Honorary President of the Turkic Council. On 7 September, he visited Moscow once again to attend the Moscow City Day celebrations on the VDNKh and to open his pavilion at the trade show. During a visit to the Azerbaijani capital of Baku, he told the hosting President Ilham Aliyev that his father, former president Heydar Aliyev, would be "very delighted" with the development of the capital. In late October, he attended the Enthronement of Japanese emperor Naruhito as the representative of Kazakhstan. During this visit, he met with Ukrainian president Volodymyr Zelenskyy, during which he congratulated him on his election victory and was invited by Zelenskyy to visit Kyiv. Nazarbayev met with Spanish tennis player Rafael Nadal during his visit to Kazakhstan for a charity tennis match. During his meeting with Nadal, he personally called former Spanish King Juan Carlos I. In October 2019, it was announced that all potential ministerial candidates needed the approval of Nazarbayev before being appointed by Tokayev, with the exception of Minister of Defence, Interior Minister and Foreign Minister.

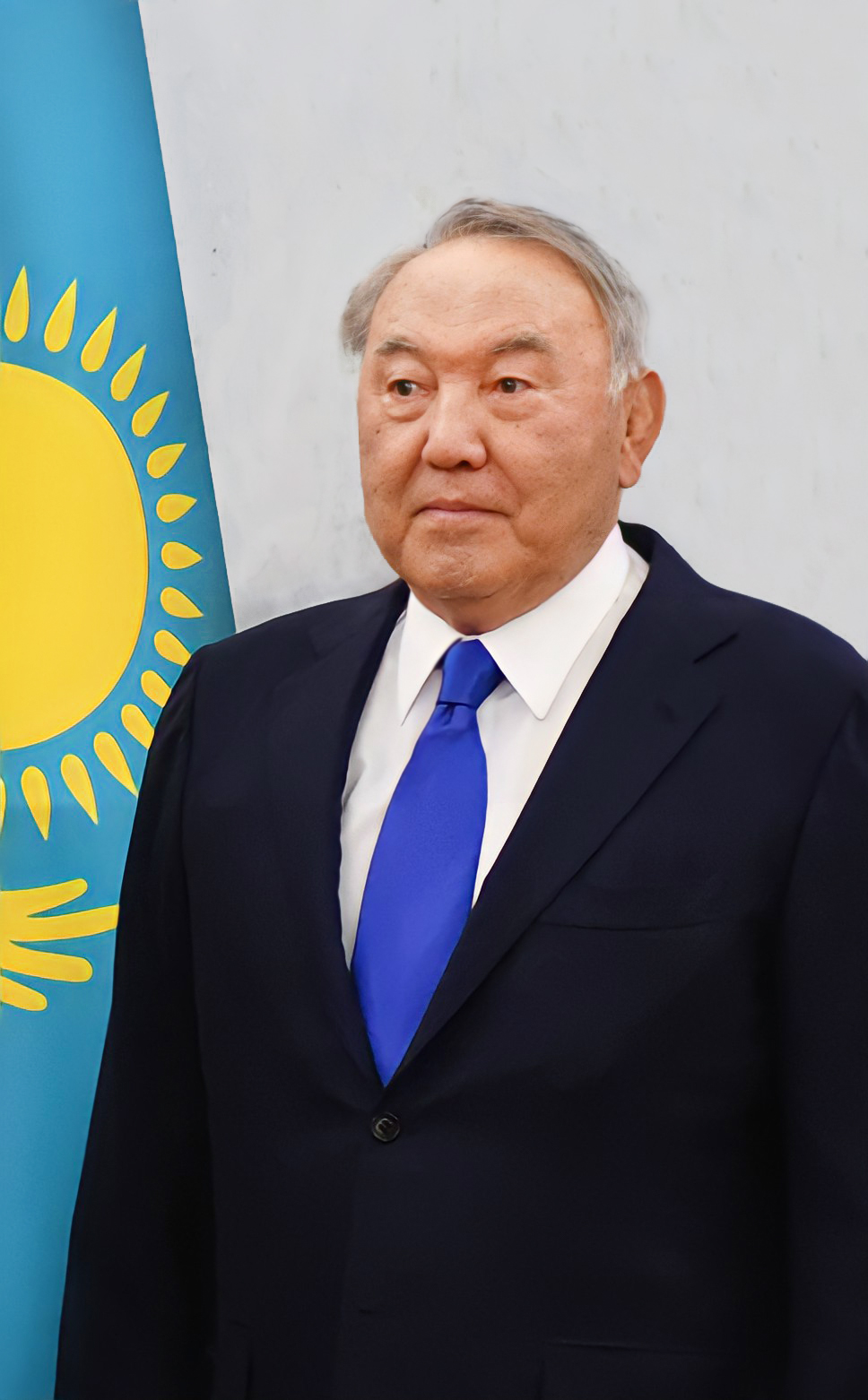
Nazarbayev in 2021

On 29 November 2019, Nazarbayev was named the Honorary Chair of Central Asian Consultative Meeting. It was announced at the second Consultative Meeting of the Heads of State of Central Asia in Tashkent.

At the 29th Session of the Assembly of People of Kazakhstan (QHA) held on 28 April 2021, Nazarbayev announced his intention to step down as the QHA chairman and have President Kassym-Jomart Tokayev to succeed his role, describing it as an emotional "serious step". However from there, Tokayev suggested for Nazarbayev to be named as an "Honorary Chairman" by the QHA to which his statements received applause. Nazarbayev accepted the offer, promising to continue to work with the Assembly.

In October 2021, during a visit to the United Arab Emirates, Nazarbayev awarded Crown Prince Mohamed bin Zayed Al Nahyan the Nuclear Weapon-Free World and Global Security award for ensuring peace, regional stability and sustainable economic development.

On 23 November 2021, at the Nur Otan political council meeting, it was revealed that Nazarbayev would resign from the party's leadership and suggested President Tokayev to take over the position, stressing that the Nur Otan should be led by an incumbent president. The move was met with various reactions from political analysts and activists, affirming that it would increase Tokayev's governing powers and influence over the Kazakh politics while some going as far as proclaiming it as an end to the "era of Nazarbayev". According to Nazarbayev's press secretary Aidos Ükıbai, the decision was a "logical continuation of the transit of power" with the party needing to be main support for Tokayev due to "the global crisis caused by the pandemic."

=== Capital renaming ===
On 20 March 2019, after Nazarbayev's resignation, President Kassym-Jomart Tokayev proposed renaming the capital Astana to Nur-Sultan in honor of Nazarbayev. The Parliament of Kazakhstan officially voted in favour of the renaming.

However, Kazakhstan changed the name of the capital from Nur-Sultan back to Astana in September 2022.

=== COVID-19 ===
Nazarbayev created the Biz Birgemiz (lit. "We are Together") Fund in March 2020 "to fight the pandemic COVID-19 effectively while supporting the economy". As of June 2020, the fund gathered over 28 billion tenge ($69.3 million) to provide financial aid to more than 470,000 families in 23 cities as part of the fund's three waves of assistance. Upon his diagnosis with COVID-19 in mid-June of that year, he received calls and telegrams of support from world leaders, including Vladimir Putin and King Abdullah II of Jordan as well as former president of Croatia Stjepan Mesić.

In June 2021, Nazarbayev received a Russian-made Sputnik V vaccine against the virus. From there, he urged everyone to get vaccinated due to emergence of the new COVID-19 strains for their health, acknowledging the challenging times happening in amidst of the pandemic and wishing health and wellbeing for the public.

=== 80th birthday ===
He recovered from the virus on 3 July 2020, in time for the celebration of his 80th birthday which was held on 6 July and also coincided with the Day of the Capital City. Nazarbayev received congratulations from leader such as the Armenian president Armen Sarkissian, Russian president Vladimir Putin, former Tatar president Mintimer Shaimiev and former Turkish president Abdullah Gül. Former Deputy Minister of Foreign Affairs of Russia Grigory Karasin described Nazarbayev in an interview honoring his birthday as "one of the few world politicians who has a vision of political processes". The celebratory events were held virtually due to the COVID-19 pandemic in the country. A statue of Nazarbayev in military uniform was unveiled at the National Defense University (an institution that itself bears his name).

=== 2021 legislative campaign ===
While continuing to lead the Nur Otan after resigning from presidency, Nazarbayev signed a decree in the preparation of the 2021 legislative elections on 4 June 2020 setting the date of closed primaries would be held within the party "for open and political competition, promote civic engagement in the political process, and empower women and the youth of the country" to which he instructed for the party to include 30% of women and 20% of people under the age of 35 in its list. The primaries were held from 17 August to 3 October 2020 where Nazarbayev himself voted online.

At the 20th Nur Otan Extraordinary Congress held on 25 November 2020, the Nur Otan revealed its list of party candidates as well as electoral platforms which were approved by the delegates. Nazarbayev at the congress spoke saying:

"The party's program announced by our President [Kassym-Jomart Tokayev] today is ambitious and at the same time calculated, supported by financial and human resources. It is a logical extension of our reforms. Throughout the years of independence, I have always set clear goals, and I have said that it is necessary to work hard and hard to achieve them. And now it's the same. I support this program proposed by the President and our common task is to rally around it and work together. You have to believe in yourself, love your homeland and do everything possible for progress."

Nazarbayev, at the congress, accused the United States of "double standards" over its conduct of the 2020 presidential elections, telling "what is there to talk about now in the United States of America, the OSCE was not allowed in the elections at all. The Democrats did not allow Republican observers and so on. It is not in order to criticize a big state, but if we are criticized, then why are there such disorders?". In his response to the Belarusian protests against President Alexander Lukashenko's re-election, Nazarbayev criticized the protestors, saying "they've been fucking Belarus for a whole month," and noted the Bulgarian protests in which Nazarbayev claimed that it received a lack of international attention in contrast with Belarus. To conclude the Nur Otan congress, Nazarbayev proposed Bauyrjan Baibek to be the head of the party's campaign headquarters, a decision that was unanimously supported by the Nur Otan delegates.

In the following aftermath of the elections to the Mazhilis which were held on 10 January 2021, the ruling Nur Otan swept a comfortable majority of 76 seats despite a loss eight seats in contrary to the 2016 election. Nazarbayev congratulated the party's victory in the election saying, "Kazakhstanis associate the further development of our country, improvement of welfare with our party."

=== 2022 unrest and resignation from Security Council ===
Following the outbreak of protests followed by the Old man, out! (Kazakh: Шал, кет!) political slogan after a sudden sharp increase in gas prices, President Kassym-Jomart Tokayev declared a state of emergency in Mangystau Region and Almaty, effective from 5 January 2022. The Mamin Cabinet resigned the same day. On the evening of 5 January, Tokayev announced Nazarbayev's resignation from the Security Council. Questions regarding Nazarbayev's whereabouts arose as he was viewed to be the main target in the unrest with anti-Nazarbayev slogans being chanted throughout protests along with monuments and street names dedicated to him being vandalized and torn down.

Rumours about Nazarbayev fleeing Kazakhstan was brought up by Echo of Moscow chief editor Alexei Venediktov, claiming that he was preparing to leave the country for unspecified treatment citing inner diplomatic circle. The Kyrgyz media reported that a private jet belonging to Nazarbayev's family had allegedly arrived in the capital of Bishkek from the United Arab Emirates without official confirmation. While the Kazakh embassy in the UAE denied reports of his presence in the country. Spokesperson Aidos Ükıbai in his Twitter dismissed claims, affirming that Nazarbayev was in the capital of Nur-Sultan and that he had stayed in the country the whole time. From there, Ükıbai stated that Nazarbayev "holds a number of consultative meetings" and is in direct contact with President Tokayev, whom he urged everyone to rally around with "to overcome current challenges and ensure the integrity" of Kazakhstan.

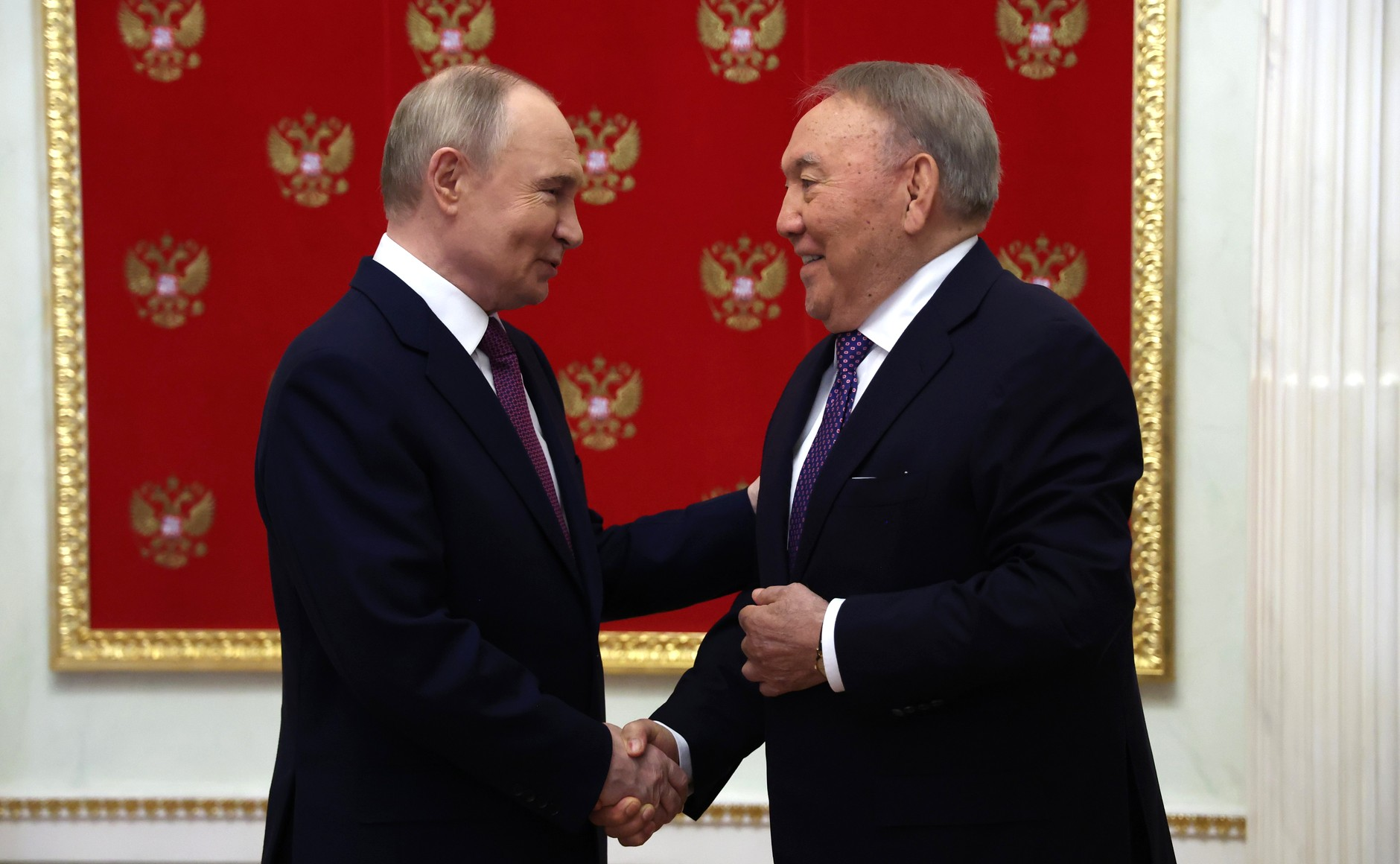
Putin's meeting with Nazarbayev in the Kremlin, Moscow, 29 May 2025

On 18 January 2022, Nazarbayev made his first public appearance in a video address since the unrest, calling the events a "tragedy" which "became a lesson for all of us." From there, he urged the public "to protect independence like the apple of one's eye" by finding out unknown people responsible for "demonstrations and murders" while expressing condolences to the families of the victims in the protests. During the address, Nazarbayev dismissed any rumours in regard to supposed inner conflict between the country's elite by calling them "absolutely groundless", insisting that he'd been a pensioner ever since handing over presidency to Tokayev whom he remarked "possesses full power" as he was set to be elected as the new chairman of the ruling Nur Otan party. Nazarbayev remarked about his achievements as president in which his goal was to form "stability and tranquility for the country" by calling for everyone to protect these "enduring values" and for unity around the Tokayev by supporting his reform agenda.

== Personal life ==
Nursultan Nazarbayev identifies as a Muslim. Nazarbayev has described his spirituality as being based on the words from Abai Qunanbaiuly, a Kazakh poet whose philosophy is based on an enlightened Islam. According to Nazarbayev, Abai's "Words of Wisdom" aided him in attempting to build a modern Kazakhstan after the collapse of the Soviet Union.

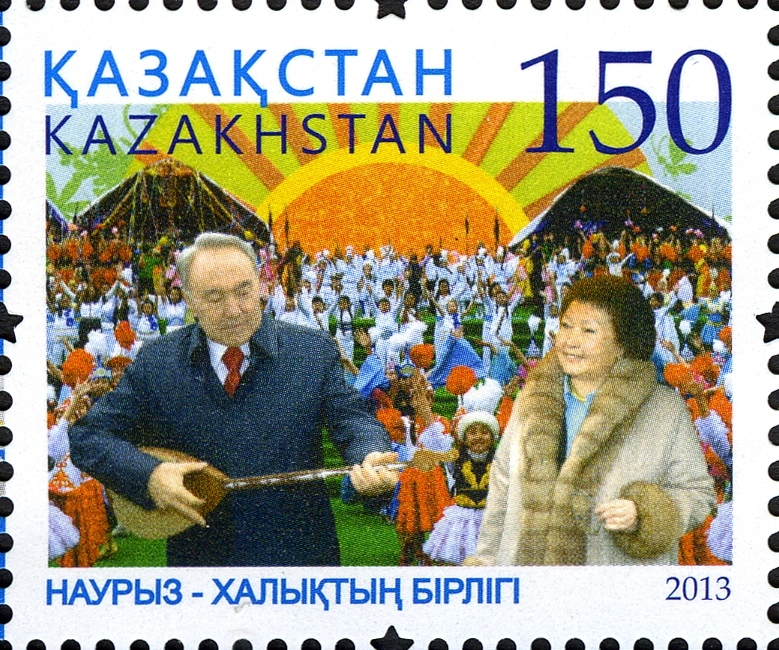
Postage stamp with Nazarbayev and his wife

Nazarbayev is married to Sara Alpysqyzy Nazarbayeva. They have three daughters: Dariga, Dinara and Aliya. Aliya's first marriage was notably to Aidar Akayev, the eldest son of former president of Kyrgyzstan Askar Akayev, which for a short period made the two Central Asian leaders related. Having grown up in the Soviet Union, Nazarbayev is fluent in Kazakh as well as Russian and understands English. He has two brothers, Satybaldy (1947–1980) and Bolat (1953–2023), as well as one sister named Anip. On 16 August 2020, Nazarbayev's grandson, Aisultan, reportedly died from cardiac arrest in London. Prior to that, Aisultan made several public statements on social media that Nazarbayev was his biological father and that his life was constantly threatened. He also accused his grandfather's associates of plotting and scheming. In response, Nazarbayev described Aisultan as being very similar to himself, expressing his regrets by telling that "one could not have sent him anywhere, but it was impossible to keep him. He was already a slave to this work and could not stop. We treated him in Moscow, and we treated him in London. It seems that I went out and came back to it again."

On 18 June 2020, it was reported that Nazarbayev had tested positive for COVID-19; a spokesman stated that Nazarbayev would go into isolation and work remotely. On 3 July 2020, Nazarbayev had recovered and was "back on his feet" three weeks after contracting the virus. Nazarbayev later during a meeting with Russian president Vladimir Putin recalled his sickness, telling that "group of Russian doctors stood by me for ten days. It was decisive in my recovery, so it will not be forgotten."

In an October 2021 interview, Nazarbayev revealed that he had suffered a disease in his spine back in 2011, to which it became noticed while attending a concert, resulting him being carefully escorted out of the hall and eventually undergo a vertebra surgery to which Nazarbayev stated was amongst things that have influenced him in eventually resigning from presidency.

In January 2023, Nursultan Nazarbayev was hospitalized at the National Scientific Cardiac Surgery Center in Astana. On 20 January 2023, a heart operation was performed, which was successful.

He gave his last name to his grandchildren: Aisultan Nazarbayev (1990–2020) and Nabi Nazarbayev (born 2008).

== Books ==
Nazarbayev has written books, including The Way of Kazakhstan published in 2010.

== Honours ==
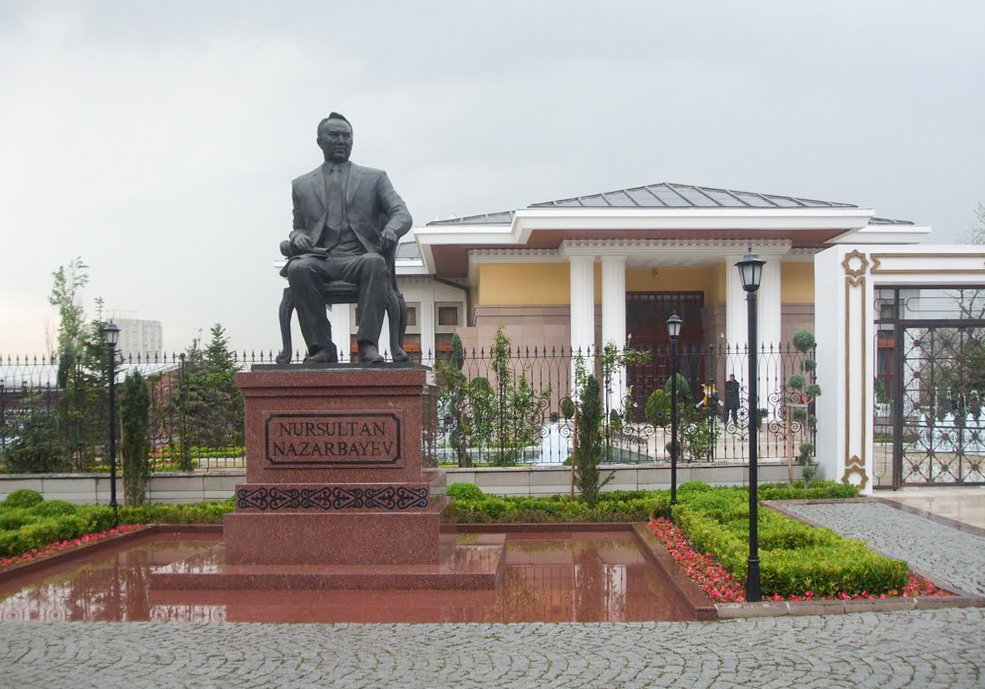
Nursultan Nazarbayev monument, Ankara, Turkey

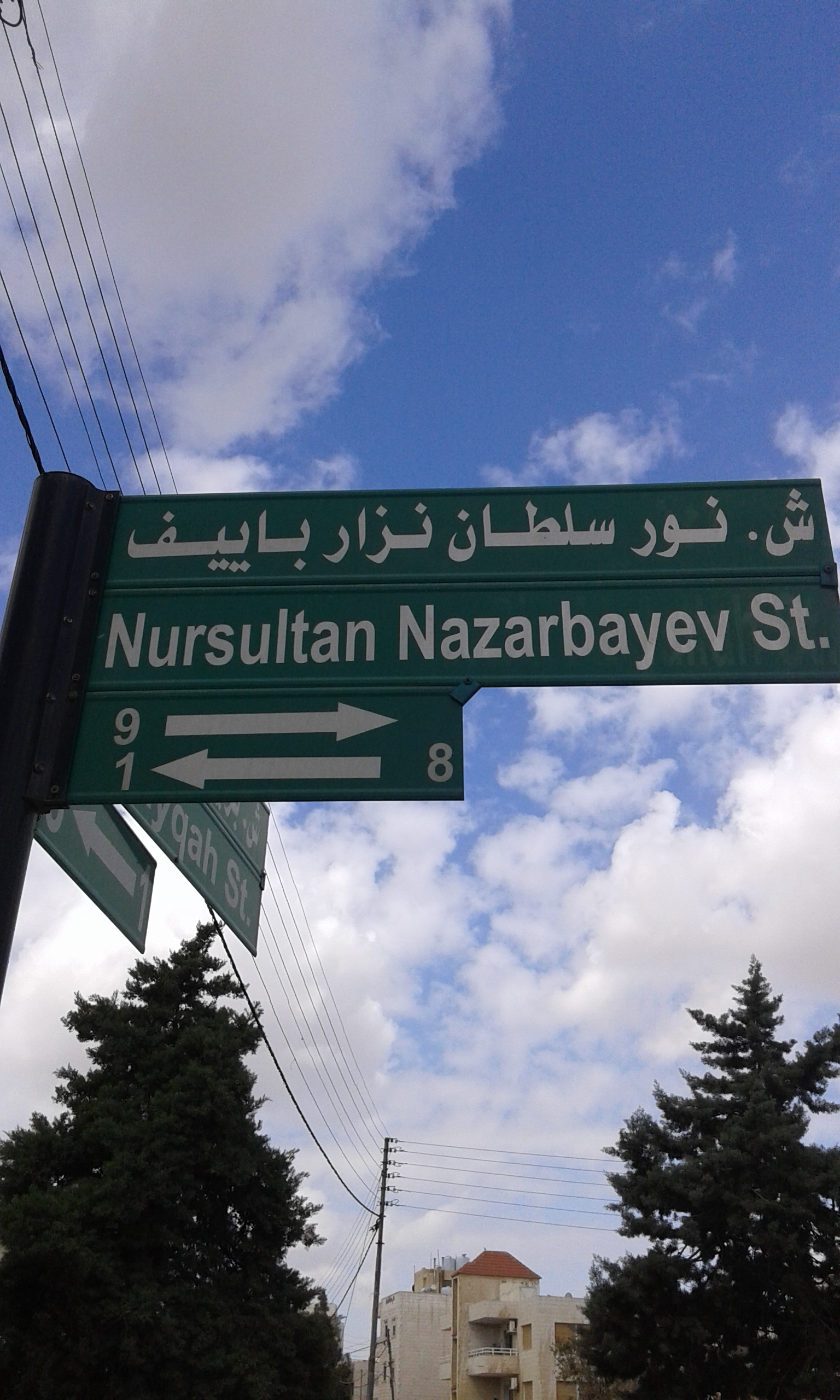
Nursultan Nazarbayev street, Amman

=== Kazakhstan ===
- Collar of the Order of the Golden Eagle
- Collar of the Order of the First President of Kazakhstan – Leader of the Nation Nursultan Nazarbayev
- Recipient of the Medal "Astana"
- Recipient of the Medal for "10 Years of the Independence of the Republic of Kazakhstan"
- Recipient of the Medal for "10th Anniversary of the Armed Forces of the Republic of Kazakhstan"
- Recipient of the Medal for "10th Anniversary of the Constitution of the Republic of Kazakhstan"
- Recipient of the Medal "In Commemoration of the 100th Anniversary of the Railway of Kazakhstan"
- Recipient of the Medal for "10 Years of the Parliament of the Republic of Kazakhstan"
- Recipient of the Medal for "50 Years of the Virgin Lands"
- Recipient of the Jubilee Medal "60 Years of Victory in the Great Patriotic War 1941-1945"
- Recipient of the Medal for "10 Years of the City of Astana"
- Recipient of the Medal for "20 Years of the Independence of the Republic of Kazakhstan"
- Algys Order

=== Soviet Union ===
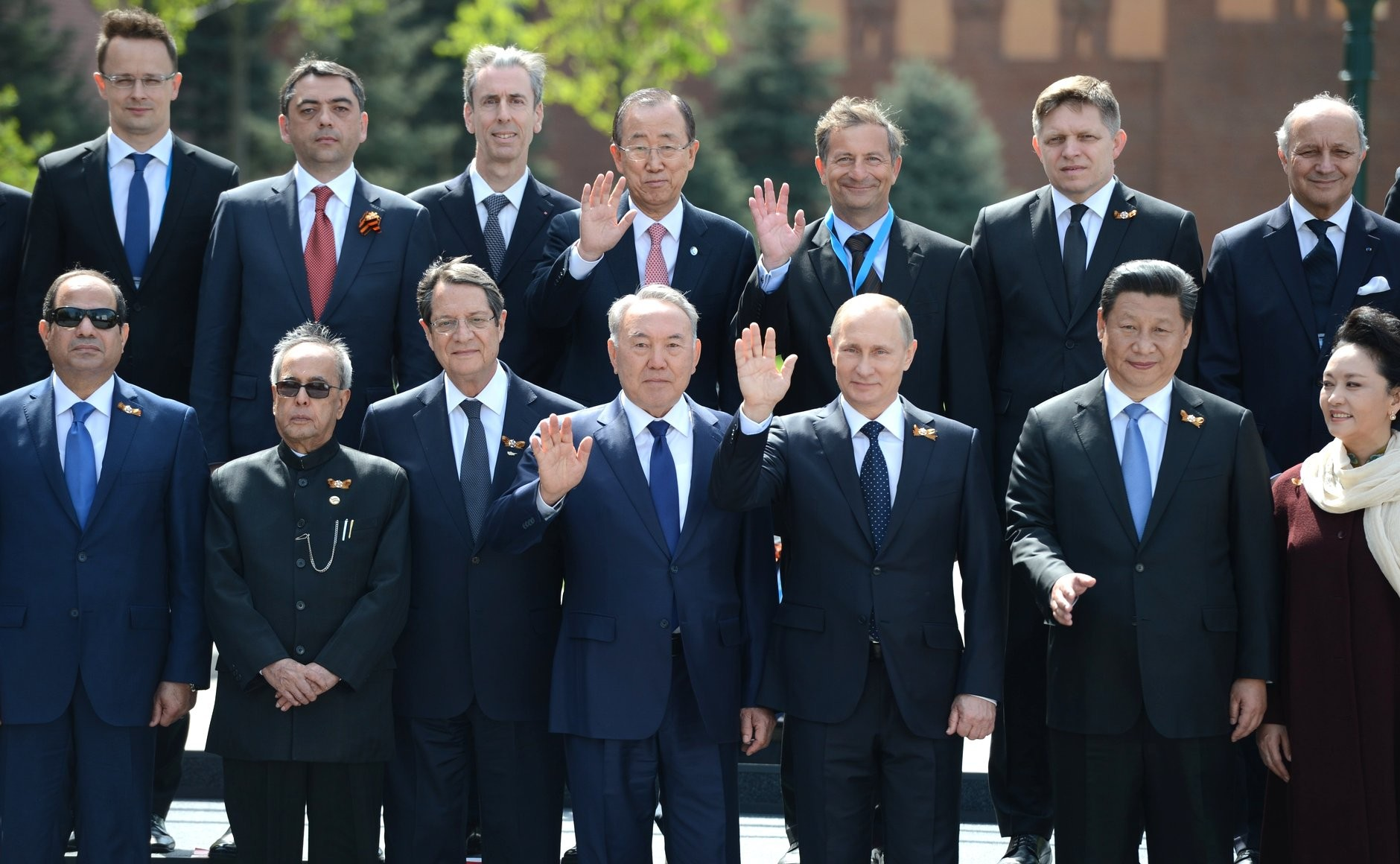
Nazarbayev with leaders of China, Russia and India during the Moscow Victory Day Parade, 9 May 2015

- Recipient of the Order of the Red Banner of Labour
- Recipient of the Order of the Badge of Honour
- Recipient of the Medal "For the Development of Virgin Lands"
- Recipient of the Jubilee Medal "70 Years of the Armed Forces of the USSR"

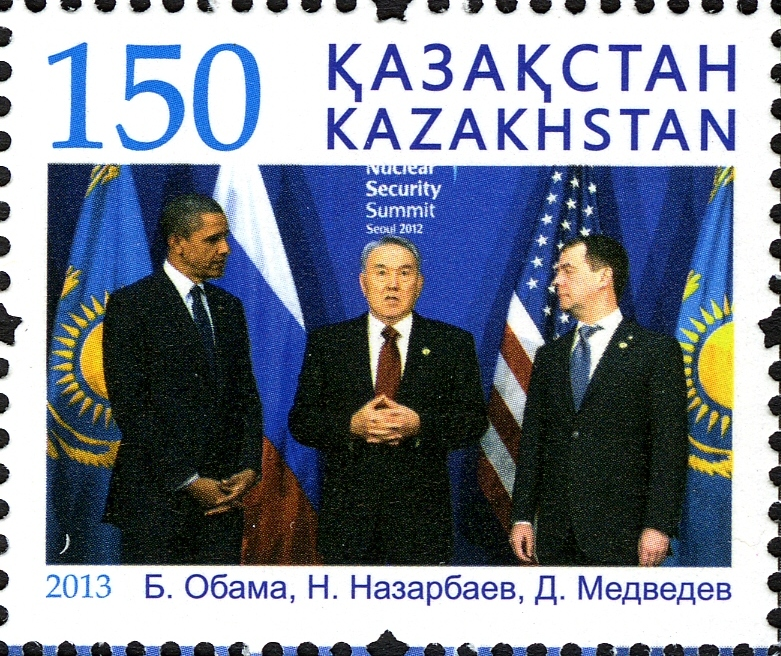
Postage stamp with Nazarbayev, Barack Obama and Dmitry Medvedev

=== Russian Federation ===
- Russia:
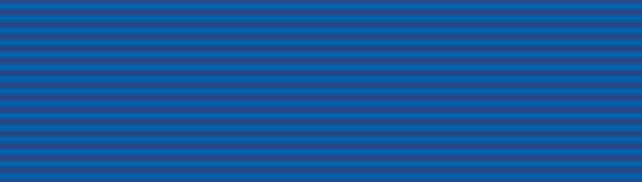
  - Knight of the Order of St. Andrew the Apostle the First-Called
  - Recipient of the Order of Alexander Nevsky
  - Recipient of the Medal "In Commemoration of the 1000th Anniversary of Kazan"
  - Recipient of the Medal "In Commemoration of the 300th Anniversary of Saint Petersburg"
  - Recipient of the Medal "In Commemoration of the 850th Anniversary of Moscow"
- Chechnya:
  - Recipient of the Order of Akhmad Kadyrov
- Tatarstan:
  - Recipient of the Order "For Merits to the Fatherland"

=== Foreign awards ===
- Afghanistan:
  - Recipient of the Amir Amanullah Khan Award
- Austria:
  - Grand Star of the Decoration of Honour for Services to the Republic of Austria
- Azerbaijan:
  - Heydar Aliyev Order
- Belarus:
  - Recipient of the Order of Friendship of Peoples
- Belgium:
  - Grand Cordon of the Order of Leopold
- China:
  - Recipient of the Order of Friendship (28 April 2019)
- Croatia:
  - Grand Cross of the Grand Order of King Tomislav
- Egypt:
  - Grand Cordon of the Order of the Nile
- Estonia:
  - First Class with Collar of the Order of the Cross of Terra Mariana
- Finland:
  - Grand Cross with Collar of the Order of the White Rose of Finland
  - Commander Grand Cross of the Order of the Lion of Finland
- France:
  - Grand Cross of the Order of Legion of Honour
- Greece:
  - Grand Cross of the Order of the Redeemer
- Hungary:
  - Grand Cross with Chair of the Order of Merit of the Republic of Hungary
- Italy:
  - Knight Grand Cross with Collar of the Order of Merit of the Italian Republic
- Japan:
  - Grand Cordon of the Order of the Chrysanthemum
- Kyrgyzstan:
  - Golden Order in honor of the 1000th anniversary of Manas
- Latvia:
  - Commander Grand Cross with Chain of the Order of the Three Stars
- Lithuania:
  - Grand Cross of the Order of Vytautas the Great (5 May 2000)
- Luxembourg:
  - Grand Cross of the Order of the Oak Crown
- Monaco:
  - Grand Cross of the Order of Saint-Charles
- Organization of Turkic States:
  - Supreme Order of Turkic World
- Poland:
  - Knight of the Order of the White Eagle
- Qatar:
  - Collar of the Order of Independence
- Romania:
  - Collar of the Order of the Star of Romania
- Serbia:
  - First Class of the Order of the Republic of Serbia
- Slovakia:
  - First Class of the Order of the White Double Cross (2007)
- South Korea:
  - Recipient of the Grand Order of Mugunghwa
- Spain:
  - Knight of the Collar of the Order of Isabella the Catholic (23 June 2017)
- Tajikistan:
  - Recipient of the Order of Ismoili Somoni
- Turkey:
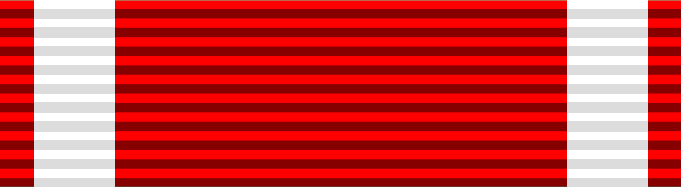
  - First Class of the Order of the State of Republic of Turkey (22 October 2009)
- Ukraine:
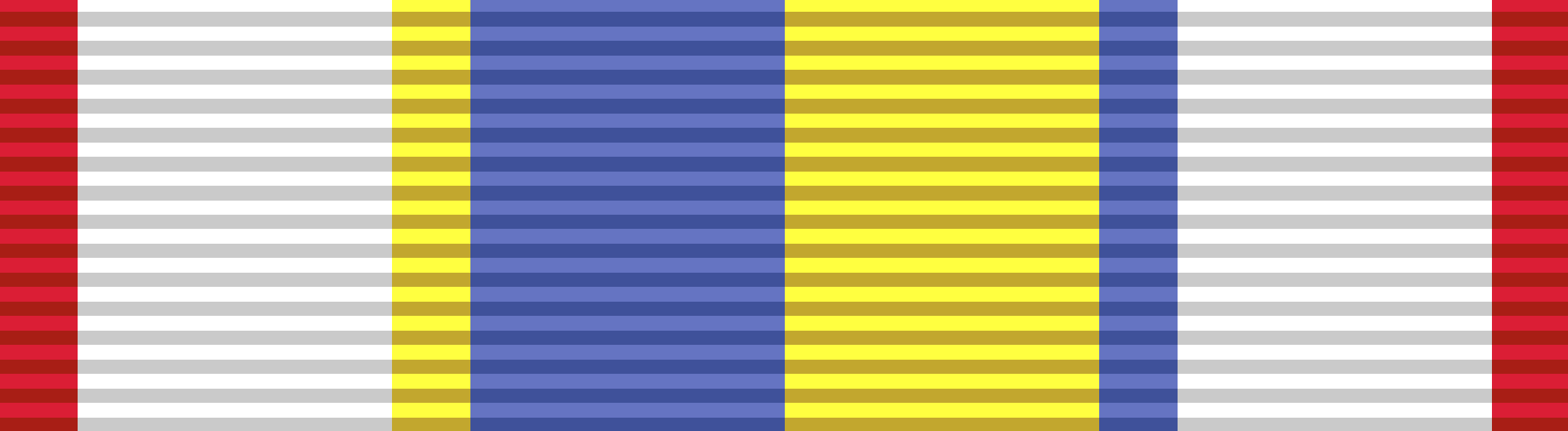
  - Member of the Order of Liberty
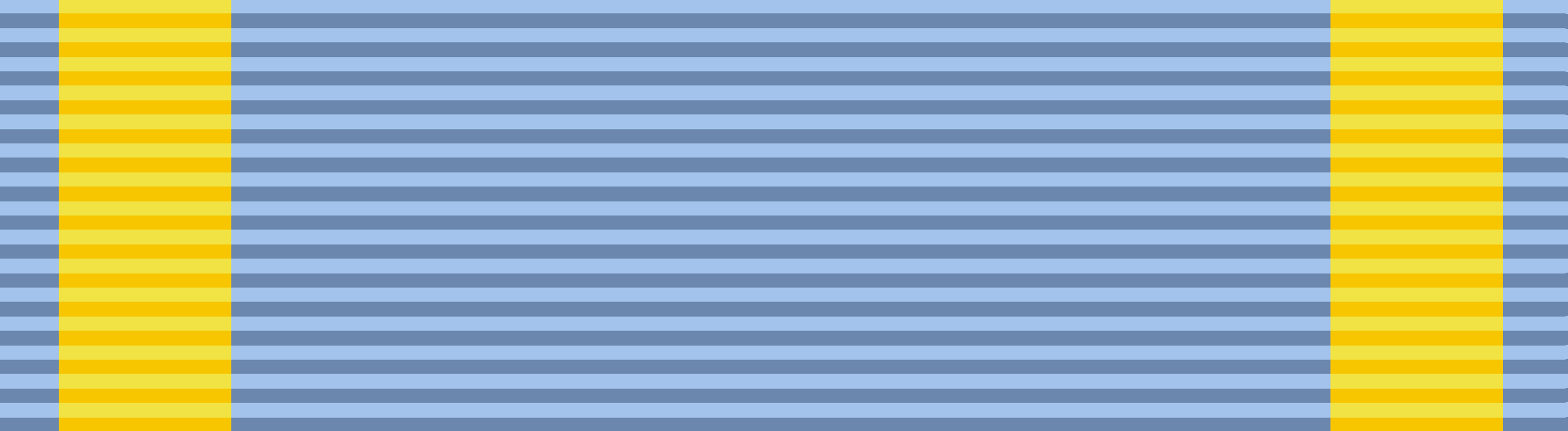
  - First Class of the Order of Prince Yaroslav the Wise
- United Arab Emirates:
  - Collar of the Order of Zayed
- United Kingdom:
  - Honorary Knight Grand Cross of the Order of St Michael and St George
- Uzbekistan:
  - Recipient of the Gold Medal of Uzbekistan

=== Other ===
- Jordan: A street in Amman is named after him.
- World Turks Qurultai: Turk El Ata (Spiritual Leader of the Turkic People).
- Russia: A street in the central part of Kazan was named after him.
- Kazakhstan: The capital of Kazakhstan, Astana, was named after him following his resignation in 2019. In September 2022 it reverted to its original name, Astana.

== In popular culture ==
Nazarbayev is portrayed by Romanian actor Dani Popescu in the 2020 satirical film Borat Subsequent Moviefilm.

In 2021, Nazarbayev was interviewed by Oliver Stone in an eight-part hagiographic documentary titled Qazaq: History of the Golden Man.

== See also ==
- Acmetal
- Counter-terrorism in Kazakhstan
- Politics of Kazakhstan

== Notes ==
Political offices
Preceded by Bayken Ashimov	Prime Minister of the Kazakh Soviet Socialist Republic; 1984–1989	Succeeded by Uzaqbay Qaramanov
Preceded by Kilibay Medeubekov	Chairman of the Supreme Soviet of the Kazakh Soviet Socialist Republic; 1990	Succeeded by Yerik Asanbayev
New office	President of Kazakhstan; 1991–2019	Succeeded by Kassym-Jomart Tokayev
New office	Chairman of the Security Council of Kazakhstan; 1991–2022	Succeeded by Kassym-Jomart Tokayev
Party political offices
Preceded by Gennady Kolbin	First Secretary of the Central Committee of the Communist Party of Kazakhstan; 1989–1991	Party dissolved
