= Bayken Ashimov =

Soviet politician

Bayken Ashimuly Ashimov (Kazakh: Бәйкен Әшімұлы Әшімов, romanized: Bäiken Äşımūly Äşımov, 10 August 1917 – 5 February 2010) was a Soviet politician. He served as Chairmen of the Council of People's Commissars from March 1970 to March 1984. He also served as Chairmen of the Presidium of the Supreme Soviet of Kazakh SSR from March 1984 to 1985.

== Death ==
Ashimov died on 5 February 2010 at the age of 92, probably due to illness.

Political offices
| Preceded by Masymkhan Beysembayev | Chairman of the Council of Ministers of the Kazakh SSR; 1970–1984 | Succeeded by Nursultan Nazarbayev |
