= List of heads of government of Kazakhstan =

This is a list of heads of government of Kazakhstan from the establishment of the office in 1917 to the present day.

== Alash Autonomy (1917–1920) ==
Alash

Portrait	Name (Birth–Death)	Term of office		Political party
1	Alikhan Bukeikhanov (1866–1937)	13 December 1917	5 March 1920	Alash

== Kyrgyz Autonomous Soviet Socialist Republic (1920–1925) ==
=== Chairmen of the Council of People's Commissars ===
- Viktor Radus-Zenkovich (12 October 1920 – 1921)
- Mukhamedkhafiy Murzagaliyev (1921 – September 1922)
- Saken Seyfullin (September 1922 – October 1924)
- Nygmet Nurmakov (October 1924 – 19 February 1925)

== Kazakh Autonomous Soviet Socialist Republic (1925–1936) ==
=== Chairmen of the Council of People's Commissars ===
- Nygmet Nurmakov (19 February 1925 – May 1928)
- Uraz Isayev (May 1928 – 5 December 1936)

== Kazakh Soviet Socialist Republic (1936–1991) ==
=== Chairmen of the Council of People's Commissars ===
- Uraz Isayev (5 December 1936 – September 1937)
- Ibragim Tazhiyev (September 1937 – 17 July 1938)
- Nurtas Undasynov (17 July 1938 – 15 March 1946)

=== Chairmen of the Council of Ministers ===
- Nurtas Undasynov(15 March 1946 – 24 March 1951)
- Elubai Taibekov (24 September 1951 – 31 March 1955)
- Dinmukhamed Kunaev (31 March 1955 – 20 January 1960) (1st time)
- Zhumabek Tashenev (20 January 1960 – 6 January 1961)
- Salken Daulenov (6 January 1961 – 13 September 1962)
- Masymkhan Beysembayev (13 September – 26 December 1962) (1st time)
- Dinmukhamed Kunaev (26 December 1962 – 7 December 1964) (2nd time)
- Masymkhan Beysembayev (7 December 1964 – 31 March 1970) (2nd time)
- Bayken Ashimov (31 March 1970 – 22 March 1984)
- Nursultan Nazarbayev (22 March 1984 – 27 July 1989)
- Uzakbay Karamanov (27 July 1989 – 20 November 1990)

=== Prime minister ===
- Uzakbay Karamanov (20 November 1990 – 14 October 1991)
- Sergey Tereshchenko (16 October – 16 December 1991)

== Republic of Kazakhstan (1991–present) ==
=== Prime ministers ===
People's Union of Kazakhstan Unity / Nur Otan Independent

No.	Portrait	Prime Minister	Took office	Left office	Time in office	Party	President	Cabinet	Ref.
1	Sergey Tereshchenko	Sergey Tereshchenko (1951–2023)	16 December 1991	12 October 1994	2 years, 300 days	Independent	Nursultan Nazarbayev (1990 – 2019)	Tereshchenko	.
2	Akezhan Kazhegeldin	Akezhan Kazhegeldin (born 1952)	12 October 1994	10 October 1997	2 years, 363 days	People's Union	Nursultan Nazarbayev (1990 – 2019)	Kazhegeldin	.
3	Nurlan Balgimbayev	Nurlan Balgimbayev (1947–2015)	10 October 1997	1 October 1999	1 year, 356 days	People's Union	Nursultan Nazarbayev (1990 – 2019)	Balgimbayev	.
4	Kassym-Jomart Tokayev	Kassym-Jomart Tokayev (born 1953)	1 October 1999	28 January 2002	2 years, 119 days	Nur Otan	Nursultan Nazarbayev (1990 – 2019)	Tokayev	.
5	Imangali Tasmagambetov	Imangali Tasmagambetov (born 1956)	28 January 2002	11 June 2003	1 year, 136 days	Nur Otan	Nursultan Nazarbayev (1990 – 2019)	Tasmagambetov	.
6	Daniyal Akhmetov	Daniyal Akhmetov (born 1954)	11 June 2003	10 January 2007	3 years, 211 days	Nur Otan	Nursultan Nazarbayev (1990 – 2019)	Daniyal Akhmetov	.
7	Karim Massimov	Karim Massimov (born 1965)	10 January 2007	24 September 2012	5 years, 258 days	Nur Otan	Nursultan Nazarbayev (1990 – 2019)	Massimov I	.
8	Serik Akhmetov	Serik Akhmetov (born 1958)	24 September 2012	2 April 2014	1 year, 190 days	Nur Otan	Nursultan Nazarbayev (1990 – 2019)	Serik Akhmetov	.
(7)	Karim Massimov	Karim Massimov (born 1965)	2 April 2014	8 September 2016	2 years, 159 days	Nur Otan	Nursultan Nazarbayev (1990 – 2019)	Massimov II	.
9	Bakhytzhan Sagintayev	Bakhytzhan Sagintayev (born 1963)	8 September 2016	21 February 2019	2 years, 166 days	Nur Otan	Nursultan Nazarbayev (1990 – 2019)	Sagintayev	.
10	Askar Mamin	Askar Mamin (born 1965)	21 February 2019	5 January 2022	2 years, 318 days	Nur Otan	Kassym-Jomart Tokayev (since 2019)	Mamin	.
11	Alihan Smaiylov	Alihan Smaiylov (born 1972)	5 January 2022	5 February 2024	2 years, 31 days	Amanat	Kassym-Jomart Tokayev (since 2019)	Smaiylov	.
—	Roman Sklyar	Roman Sklyar (born 1971); Acting	5 February 2024	6 February 2024	1 day	Amanat	Kassym-Jomart Tokayev (since 2019)	–	.
12	Oljas Bektenov	Oljas Bektenov (born 1980)	6 February 2024	28 August 2026	2 years, 203 days	Independent	Kassym-Jomart Tokayev (since 2019)	Bektenov	.

== See also ==
- Prime Minister of Kazakhstan
- President of Kazakhstan
- Vice President of Kazakhstan
- List of leaders of Kazakhstan
