= Second Balgimbayev Government =

Government of Kazakhstan

- 4th Cabinet of Kazakhstan
- January–October 1999
- Date formed: 21 January 1999
- Date dissolved: 12 October 1999

People and organisations
- Head of state: Nursultan Nazarbayev
- Head of government: Nurlan Balgimbayev; Kassym-Jomart Tokayev (acting)
- Deputy head of government: Akhmetzhan Yessimov; Oraz Jandosov
- Member party: Independent; People's Union of Kazakhstan Unity; Democratic Party
- Status in legislature: Minority
- Opposition party: People's Congress
- Opposition leader: Olzhas Suleimenov

History
- Predecessor: Balgimbayev I
- Successor: Tokayev

The Second Balgimbayev Government was the fourth government of Kazakhstan, led by Nurlan Balgimbayev. It was formed on 21 January 1999, following Balgimbayev's resignation after the 1999 presidential election. However, he was reappointed by President Nursultan Nazarbayev, and the composition of the government cabinet was formed on the following day, 22 January 1999. His tenure faced various political challenges, leading to his resignation and subsequent reappointment.

Balgimbayev's government faced a scandal after it had allowed to illegally sell MiG-21 aircraft to North Korea which led to rumors of Balgimbayev's possible resignation from the post. On 1 October 1999, he announced his resignation stating that the need for a government to tackle the economic crisis and as a result, Kassym-Jomart Tokayev who served as a deputy prime minister under Balgimbayev became the acting prime minister of the caretaker government until his confirmation on 12 October.

== Composition ==
Functions	Holder	Start	End
Prime Minister	Nurlan Balgimbayev	21 January 1999	1 October 1999
Prime Minister	Kassym-Jomart Tokayev (acting)	1 October 1999	12 October 1999
Deputy Prime Minister — Minister of Finance	Oraz Jandosov	22 January 1999	21 November 2001
Deputy Prime Minister — Minister of Agriculture	Janibek Karibjanov	22 January 1999	26 July 1999
Deputy Prime Minister	Aleksandr Pavlov	22 January 1999	3 October 1999
Chief of Staff of the Office of the Prime Minister	Altai Tileuberdin	22 January 1999	12 October 1999
Minister of Agriculture	Sauat Mynbayev	26 July 1999	12 October 1999
Ministry of Foreign Affairs	Kassym-Jomart Tokayev	22 January 1999	12 October 1999
Ministry of Defense	Mukhtar Altynbayev	22 January 1999	9 August 1999
Ministry of Internal Affairs — Commander of the Internal Troops of the Republic of Kazakhstan	Kairbek Suleimenov	22 January 1999	12 October 1999
Minister of State Revenues	Zeinolla Käkimjanov	22 January 1999	12 October 1999
Minister of Healthcare, Protection, Education and Sports	Krymbek Kusherbayev	22 January 1999	12 October 1999
Minister of Culture, Information and Public Accord	Altynbek Sarsenbayuly	22 January 1999	12 October 1999
Minister of Science and Higher Education	Vladimir Shkolnik	22 January 1999	12 October 1999
Minister of Natural Resources and Environmental Protection	Serikbek Däukeev	22 January 1999	12 October 1999
Minister of Transport, Communications and Tourism	Serik Bürkitbaev	22 January 1999	12 October 1999
Ministry of Justice	Bauyrzhan Mukhamedzhanov	13 October 1997	12 October 1999
Ministry of Labour and Social Protection of the Population	Natalya Korzhova	22 January 1999	12 October 1999
Ministry of Energy and Trade	Mukhtar Ablyazov	21 April 1998	12 October 1999
