= Tereshchenko Cabinet =

Composition of the government of Kazakhstan

- 1st Cabinet of Kazakhstan
- 1991–1994
- Date formed: 14 October 1991
- Date dissolved: 12 October 1994

People and organisations
- Head of state: Nursultan Nazarbayev
- Head of government: Sergey Tereshchenko
- Deputy head of government: Yevgeny Ezhikov-Babakhanov; Daulet Sembaev; Oleg Soskovets; Akezhan Kazhegeldin
- Member party: Independent; People's Union of Kazakhstan Unity
- Status in legislature: Minority 33 / 177
- Opposition party: People's Congress
- Opposition leader: Olzhas Suleimenov

History
- Legislature term: 1st
- Predecessor: Karamanov II
- Successor: Kazhegeldin

The Tereshchenko Cabinet was the composition of the government of Kazakhstan from 16 October 1991 to 12 October 1994 under the leadership of Prime Minister Sergey Tereshchenko. The cabinet ceased to exist after the Supreme Council of Kazakhstan passed a vote of no-confidence in May 1994. Despite that, Tereshchenko still held the post for a couple of months until he was finally dismissed by President Nursultan Nazarbayev on 12 October following a corruption scandal by the Minister of Internal Affairs.

== Composition ==
Functions	Holder	Start	End
Prime Minister	Sergey Tereshchenko	16 October 1991	12 October 1994
First Deputy Prime Minister	Yevgeny Ezhikov-Babakhanov	25 June 1991	6 February 1992
First Deputy Prime Minister	Daulet Sembaev	6 February 1992	17 December 1993
First Deputy Prime Minister	Oleg Soskovets	6 February 1992	5 November 1992
First Deputy Prime Minister	Akezhan Kazhegeldin	18 December 1993	12 October 1994
Deputy Prime Minister	Kalyk Abdullaev	31 August 1991	July 1992
Deputy Prime Minister	Daulet Sembaev	16 October 1991	6 February 1992
Deputy Prime Minister	Qadyr Baykenov	25 June 1991	18 January 1993
Deputy Prime Minister	Baltash Tursumbaev	25 June 1991	18 January 1993
Deputy Prime Minister	Myrzatai Joldasbekov	25 June 1991	18 January 1993
Deputy Prime Minister	Asygat Jabagin	18 January 1993	1 September 1994
Deputy Prime Minister	Galym Abilsiitov	18 January 1993	11 October 1994
Deputy Prime Minister	Syzdyq Abishev	22 June 1993	13 June 1994
Deputy Prime Minister	Quanysh Sultanov	18 January 1993	18 March 1994
Deputy Prime Minister	Sergey Kulagin	22 June 1993	11 October 1994
Deputy Prime Minister	Janibek Karibjanov	18 January 1993	12 June 1994
Deputy Prime Minister	Tolegen Jukeev	18 March 1994	14 October 1994
Ministry of Trade	Oktyabr Zheltikov	5 June 1990	June 1994
Ministry of Industry	Ivan Vlasov	25 February 1991	6 February 1992
Ministry of Industry	Albert Salamatin	26 December 1992	June 1994
Ministry of Industry and Commerce	Vyacheslav Kostyuchenko	June 1994	October 1994
Ministry of Economy	Beisenbai Izteleuov	January 1993	February 1994
Ministry of Economy	Mars Urkumbaev	February 1994	September 1994
Ministry of Finance	Tuleubek Abdikadirov	April 1990	12 November 1992
Ministry of Finance	Erkeshbai Derbisov	November 1992	October 1994
Ministry of Material Resources	Kanat Turapov	11 February 1992	12 December 1992
Ministry of Energy and Electrification	Bulat Nurjanov	April 1990	7 February 1992
Ministry of Energy and Fuel Resources	Kadyr Baikenov	7 February 1992	June 1994
Ministry of Energy and Coal Industry	Vladimir Karmakov	June 1994	October 1994
Ministry of Foreign Economic Relations	Syzdyq Abishev	December 1990	June 1994
Ministry of Foreign Affairs	Toleutai Suleimenov	December 1991	April 1994
Ministry of Foreign Affairs	Kanat Saudabayev	18 April 1994	12 October 1994
Ministry of Science and New Technology	Galym Abilsiitov	7 February 1992	August 1994
Ministry of Geology and Subsoil Protection	Lev Trubnikov	11 February 1992	24 November 1993
Ministry of Oil and Gas Industry	Ravil Cherdabaev	June 1994	October 1994
Minister of Ecology and Bioresources	Svyatoslav Medvedev	11 February 1992	October 1994
Ministry of Communications	Igor Ulyanov	March 1987	June 1994
Ministry of Highways	Shamil Bekbulatov	January 1981	12 February 1992
Ministry of Transport	Nygmetjan Esengarin	February 1991	June 1994
Ministry of Transport and Communications	Nygmetjan Esengarin	June 1994	October 1994
Ministry of Housing and Land Development	Askar Kulibaev	20 September 1993	October 1994
Ministry of Agriculture and Food	Valentin Dvurechensky	December 1990	7 February 1992
Ministry of Agriculture	Baltash Tursumbaev	7 February 1992	18 November 1993
Ministry of Defense	Sagadat Nurmagambetov	7 May 1992	October 1994
Ministry of Internal Affairs	Mikhail Bersenyov	April 1990	17 April 1992
Ministry of Internal Affairs	Vladimir Shumov	17 April 1992	September 1994
Ministry of Print and Media	Quanysh Sultanov	August 1991	18 January 1993
Ministry of Print and Media	Altynbek Sarsenbayuly	20 January 1993	October 1994
Ministry of Tourism, Physical Education and Sports	Karatai Turysov	August 1991	17 December 1993
Ministry of Youth, Tourism and Sports	Byrganym Aitimova	17 December 1993	October 1994
Ministry of Public Education	Shaysultan Shayahmetov	June 1988	15 October 1993
Ministry of Public Education	Erejep Mambetkaziev	15 October 1993	October 1994
Ministry of Culture	Erkegali Rahmadiev	12 February 1992	26 October 1993
Ministry of Culture	Serik Ashlyaev	26 October 1993	October 1994
Ministry of Healthcare	Aksultan Amanbaev	1990	28 April 1992
Ministry of Healthcare	Vasiliy Devyatko	28 April 1992	October 1994
Ministry of Labour	Sayat Beisenov	14 March 1991	24 November 1993
Ministry of Labour	Viktor Sobolev	24 November 1993	11 October 1994
Ministry of Social Security	Zaure Kadyrova	1990	February 1992
Ministry of Social Protection	Zaure Kadyrova	February 1992	June 1994
Ministry of Social Protection	Baikarim Tutenov	June 1994	October 1994
Ministry of Justice	Galihan Erjanov	May 1990	16 June 1993
Ministry of Justice	Nagashbai Shaikenov	16 June 1993	October 1995
