= First Balgimbayev Government =

Government of Kazakhstan

- 3rd Cabinet of Kazakhstan
- 1997–1999
- Date formed: 10 October 1997
- Date dissolved: 21 January 1999

People and organisations
- Head of state: Nursultan Nazarbayev
- Head of government: Nurlan Balgimbayev
- Deputy head of government: Akhmetzhan Yessimov; Oraz Jandosov
- Member party: Independent; People's Union of Kazakhstan Unity; Democratic Party
- Status in legislature: Minority
- Opposition party: People's Congress
- Opposition leader: Olzhas Suleimenov

History
- Predecessor: Kazhegeldin
- Successor: Balgimbayev II

The First Balgimbayev Government was the third government of Kazakhstan, led by Prime Minister Nurlan Balgimbayev. The government was formed after Prime Minister Akezhan Kazhegeldin resigned on 10 October 1997 due to apparent health reasons. That same day, President Nursultan Nazarbayev appointed Balgimbayev as Prime Minister, and he was promptly approved by the Parliament.

Balgimbayev focused on addressing economic challenges, particularly following the 1998 Russian financial crisis, which significantly affected Kazakhstan's economy. His handling of the situation drew criticism, leading to an attempted motion of no confidence against him in October 1998. Following the 1999 presidential election, Balgimbayev resigned on 21 January 1999 but was reappointed shortly after, leading the newly formed government.

== Composition ==
Functions	Holder	Start	End
Prime Minister	Nurlan Balgimbayev	10 October 1997	1 October 1999
First Deputy Prime Minister	Akhmetzhan Yessimov	24 October 1996	20 February 1998
First Deputy Prime Minister	Oraz Jandosov	20 February 1998	21 November 2001
Deputy Prime Minister	Aleksandr Pavlov	14 September 1996	3 October 1999
Deputy Prime Minister	Baltash Tursumbaev	25 October 1998	2 November 1998
Ministry of Foreign Affairs	Erlan Idrissov	18 April 1994	12 October 1994
Ministry of Foreign Affairs	Kassym-Jomart Tokayev	13 October 1994	12 October 1999
Ministry of Defense	Mukhtar Altynbayev	30 October 1996	9 August 1999
Ministry of Internal Affairs	Kairbek Suleimenov	18 October 1995	20 December 2000
Ministry of Agriculture	Serik Aqymbekov	March 1996	January 1998
Ministry of Agriculture	Sergey Kulagin	January 1998	September 1998
Ministry of Agriculture	Toleuhan Nurkiianov	September 1998	January 1999
Ministry of Justice	Bauyrzhan Mukhamedzhanov	13 October 1997	September 2000
Ministry of Science and New Technologies	Vladimir Shkolnik	21 August 1994	October 1999
Minister of Education, Culture and Healthcare	Krymbek Kusherbayev	17 October 1997	January 1999
Ministry of Labour and Social Protection of the Population	Natalya Korzhova	November 1996	October 1999
Ministry of Transport, Communications, and Tourism	Erkin Kaliev	1997	September 1998
Ministry of Transport, Communications, and Tourism	Serik Burkitbaev	September 1998	January 1999
Ministry of Information and Public Accord	Altynbek Sarsenbayuly	October 1997	January 1999
Ministry of Finance	Aleksandr Pavlov	October 1994	February 1998
Ministry of Finance	Sauat Mynbayev	February 1998	January 1999
Ministry of Energy, Industry and Trade	Asygat Jabagin	October 1997	April 1998
Ministry of Energy and Trade	Mukhtar Ablyazov	21 April 1998	October 1999
Ministry of Ecology and Natural Resources	Serikbek Daukeev	October 1997	January 1999
