= 1999 in Kazakhstan =

- Decades: 1990s; 2000s; 2010s
- See also: Other events of 1999; Timeline of Kazakhstani history

Events in the year 1999 in Kazakhstan.

== Incumbents ==
- President: Nursultan Nazarbayev
- Prime Minister: Nurlan Balgimbayev (1997–1999) and Kassym-Jomart Tokayev (1999–2002)

== Events ==
=== January ===
- January 10 – Nursultan Nazarbayev was sworn in for another term following a victory in the presidential election.

=== February ===
- February 26 – The country adopted a treaty on a Common Economic Union.

=== October ===
- October 10 – The Fatherland party won the legislative election.

=== November ===
- November 5 – The Astana Zhas Ulan Republican School was founded.
