= Corruption in Kazakhstan =

Corruption in Kazakhstan constitutes a persistent systemic challenge, manifesting in both public and commercial spheres. Despite legislative and institutional anti-corruption initiatives, the country remains vulnerable to corruption scandals, which reach the highest levels of the Kazakh government. In the 2024 Transparency International Corruption Perceptions Index, Kazakhstan was positioned 88th out of 180 countries, attaining a score of 39 out of 100. This rating places the country within the index's classification of nations exhibiting significant levels of corruption, highlighting the ongoing need for substantive reforms.

== Judicial corruption ==
The Kazakh judiciary has faced increasing scrutiny regarding allegations of corruption. Notably, by 2021, over 30 judicial officers were convicted on corruption charges, with approximately half receiving imprisonment as punishment. This trend is demonstrated in the 2022 case involving a former chairman of the Kostanay District Court. He was sentenced to nine years' imprisonment following a conviction for accepting a bribe of approximately $40,000. Allegations of corruption persist as more judges are accused of wrongdoing by 2023. These include a judge in Talgar, who was charged with accepting a bribe in favor of a perpetrator who abused a child. These cases underscore systemic vulnerabilities within the judicial system and highlight the ongoing efforts to address corruption within this sector. It also contributes to the inability of the government to address corruption as it undermines the enforcement of anti-corruption measures.

== Public sector ==
Corruption in other branches of the government is also rampant. In 2022, around 1,000 corruption crimes were reported involving at least 600 public officials, including 110 heads of state structures. Corruption charges include bribery, embezzlement, fraud, misappropriation, and abuse of power. Almost half of reported corruption cases involved bribery. This was supported by the World Bank's global Enterprise survey. The study revealed that every fourth private company operating in the country faces extortion of bribes from officials in government agencies. This leads to the unfavorable business environment and discourages foreign investment. It is estimated that Kazakhstan loses $3.8 billion in revenues annually due to these corrupt practices.

The Khorgos Customs Corruption case, one of Kazakhstan's largest corruption scandals, exemplifies the pervasive nature of illicit activity within the country. It involved high-ranking officials from the National Security Committee and customs services, who were accused of orchestrating a criminal enterprise that extorted bribes at the Kazakh-Chinese border. Its operations entailed a "green corridor" scheme that allowed the smuggling of contrabands with the complicity of customs officers.

== High-profile cases ==
There are several high-profile cases that indicate the severity of Kazakhstan's corruption problem. One example is the case of the former President Nursultan Nazarbayev, who ruled Kazakhstan for nearly three decades. He was accused of accumulating ill-gotten wealth during the course of his administration. The extent of corruption is highlighted by the involvement of his family and close associates. This was evident in the so-called "Kazakhgate", the scandal in the 1990s that involved allegations of bribery related to oil deals. It was revealed in an investigation by U.S. authorities that American businessman James Giffen bribed Kazakh officials millions of dollars to obtain oil contracts. Nazarbayev is potentially one of those who received payments. Giffen, who was described as a close friend of Nazarbayev, was never convicted after the case was dropped when it was learned that he acted with CIA approval. When Giffen was indicted, however, the prosecution alleged that he served as Nazarbayev's personal banker and money launderer.

Timur Kulibayev, Nazarbayev's son-in-law was also accused of accumulating wealth due to his connections to the former president. For instance, his company, TenizService, secured $2.5 billion from Chevron, ExxonMobil Corp., and two partners for the construction of an offloading facility, a major infrastructure project for transporting oil from the Caspian Sea's northern coast to a Russian seaport. TenizService's anchored its pitch on its "good relations" with the government, promising quick processing for a complex project that required the approval of no less than 170 officials across 46 Kazakh entities, ranging from local water officials to the Ministry of Transport.

There is also the case of the Qalbatau-Maiqapshaghai Road Project scandal, which involved the embezzlement of around $44 million allocated for the construction of a 415-kilometer highway linking Qalbatau and Maiqapshaghai in East Kazakhstan. Misappropriation of funds resulted in the highway's partial completion, with only half of the planned road constructed. The project was awarded to QazGerStroi, a subcontractor affiliated with entities owned by Qairat Satybaldy, who is Nazarbayev’s eldest nephew. Satybaldy was found guilty of fraud and embezzlement in 2022 and was jailed for six years.

== Anti-corruption measures ==
In an effort to mitigate systemic corruption and enhance transparency, Kazakhstan has instituted various anti-corruption measures, including the creation of the Anti-Corruption Agency, which is tasked with investigating corruption and recovering misappropriated assets. However, progress is impeded by persistent deficiencies in judicial independence and governmental transparency. This was highlighted in a report by the Council of Europe released in 2022. Furthermore, state control of the Kazakh media restricts public scrutiny and accountability, thereby exacerbating the challenges in combating corruption.

== Indicators of corruption ==
In the 2025 Corruption Perceptions Index, Kazakhstan was scored on a scale from 0 ("highly corrupt") to 100 ("very clean") along with 182 other countries. The country with the highest score was ranked first and is perceived to have the most honest public sector. Kazakhstan was scored at 38. Kazakhstan's score of 40 in 2024 was the highest score it had received since the current version of the Corruption Perceptions Index was introduced in 2012; its lowest score was 26 in 2013. For comparison with regional scores, the best score among Eastern European and Central Asian countries (Note: Albania, Armenia, Azerbaijan, Belarus, Bosnia and Herzegovina, Georgia, Kazakhstan, Kosovo, Kyrgyzstan, Moldova, Montenegro, North Macedonia, Russia, Serbia, Tajikistan, Turkey, Turkmenistan, Ukraine, Uzbekistan) was 50, the average score was 34 and the worst score was 17. For comparison with worldwide scores, the best score was 89 (ranked 1), the average score was 42, and the worst score was 9 (ranked 181, in a two-way tie).
