= 2021 Central Asia drought =

Natural disaster in Central Asia

A drought in Central Asia that began around April 2021 affected most of Central Asia and parts of Russia, causing mass livestock deaths, most notably of horses, and water shortages for irrigation. Food prices in the areas have been reported to increase following the drought. The shortages and drought have been linked to climate change.

== Countries ==
=== Kazakhstan ===
In early June 2021, photos from the Mangystau Region emerged on social media which showed emaciated horses on a verge of dying. According to the Ministry of Agriculture, the cause for situation was due to lack of pasturage in the area as a result of several climatic conditions, and that measures would be implemented to prevent the further casualties of livestock.

The Khabar Agency on 16 June 2021 reported that approximately 2,000 livestock had died with Kazakh lawmakers calling for a state of emergency to be implemented in the Mangystau and Kyzylorda regions, citing the problems in farmers whom were unwilling to feed the cattle due to inflated costs for animal feed. In July 2021, due to worsening situation, Kazakh President Kassym-Jomart Tokayev called on Agriculture Minister Saparhan Omarov to resign, citing his failure to provide assistance to struggling farmers. On 13 July, a state of emergency was introduced in the Aral District in an attempt to solve the shortage of feed. In a visit to Mangystau Region, acting agriculture minister Erbol Qaraşukeev pledged that 1.9 billion ₸ would allocated in order to reduce the costs of livestock feed and that a ban on its exports would be placed as well.

=== Kyrgyzstan ===
In Chüy Region, low water levels at the canals were reported, leaving the fields dry. According to Agriculture Minister, Almazbek Sokeev canal levels were "half their normal amount". As a result, frustrated farmers from the region gathered near the government building in Bishkek on 14 June 2021, demanding the Kyrgyz authorities to solve the crisis in which they blamed on "unfair distribution of water" and the "indifference of local authorities". That same day, Cabinet of Ministers Chairman Ulukbek Maripov visited the Chuy Region where he described the situation as "complicated", and a need to solve it as soon as possible.

=== Turkmenistan ===
Drought in Afghanistan, Iran and Turkmenistan 2021

In March 2021, the residents of Daşoguz were witnessed to have been selling off livestock in which according to them was due to the low amount of irrigational water, creating weak hopes in growing animal feed. At the 2 June government session, President Gurbanguly Berdimuhamedow assured that a successful harvest would occur, calling on officials to ensure farmers to be provided with all the seeds, fertilizer, modern equipment, and needed water.

The Meteojurnal.ru in late June reported that the Ahal Region was facing its worst drought in 13 years.

=== Uzbekistan ===
In Samarqand Region, residents reported an interruption in the water supply in which according to the local authorities was due to the drought which resulted in low precipitation and low water level at the Zeravshan river. In response, water rationing was introduced on 8 June 2021 specifically in the city of Samarkand for eight hours per day.
