= Gabbasov =

Gabbasov is a surname. Notable people with the surname include:

- Engels Gabbasov (1937–2014), Kazakh politician and writer
- Ruslan Gabbasov (born 1979), Russian activist
- Yerkin Gabbasov (born 1983), Kazakh paralympic sport shooter
