= Nygmet Nurmakov =

Soviet politician (1895–1937)

- Нығмет Нұрмақов

Chairman of the Council of People's Commissars of the Kazakh ASSR
- In office October 1924 – May 1928 (Note: According to other sources, in April 1929)
- Preceded by: Saken Seifullin
- Succeeded by: Uraz Isayev

Chairman of the Kazakh Branch of the Supreme Court of the RSFSR
- In office October 1921 – April 1923
- Preceded by: Office established
- Succeeded by: Tleuzhan Mukashev

Personal details
- Born: Nygmet Nurmakuly Nurmakov; 25 April 1895 Semipalatinsk Oblast, Russian Empire
- Died: 27 September 1937 (aged 42) Moscow, Soviet Union
- Resting place: Donskoye Cemetery
- Political party: CPSU (1920–1937)
- Profession: Teacher

Nyğmet Nūrmaqūly Nūrmaqov (Kazakh: Нығмет Нұрмақұлы Нұрмақов; 25 April 1895 – 27 September 1937) was a Soviet politician who served as the Chair of the Council of People's Commissars of the Kazakh ASSR (parallel to the current position of Prime Minister of Kazakhstan) from October 1924 to May 1928.

In 1926, Nurmakov was accused of supporting ethnic nationalism and exiled from Kazakhstan.
