= Daulet Sembaev =

Kazakh politician (1935–2021)

- Дәулет Сембаев
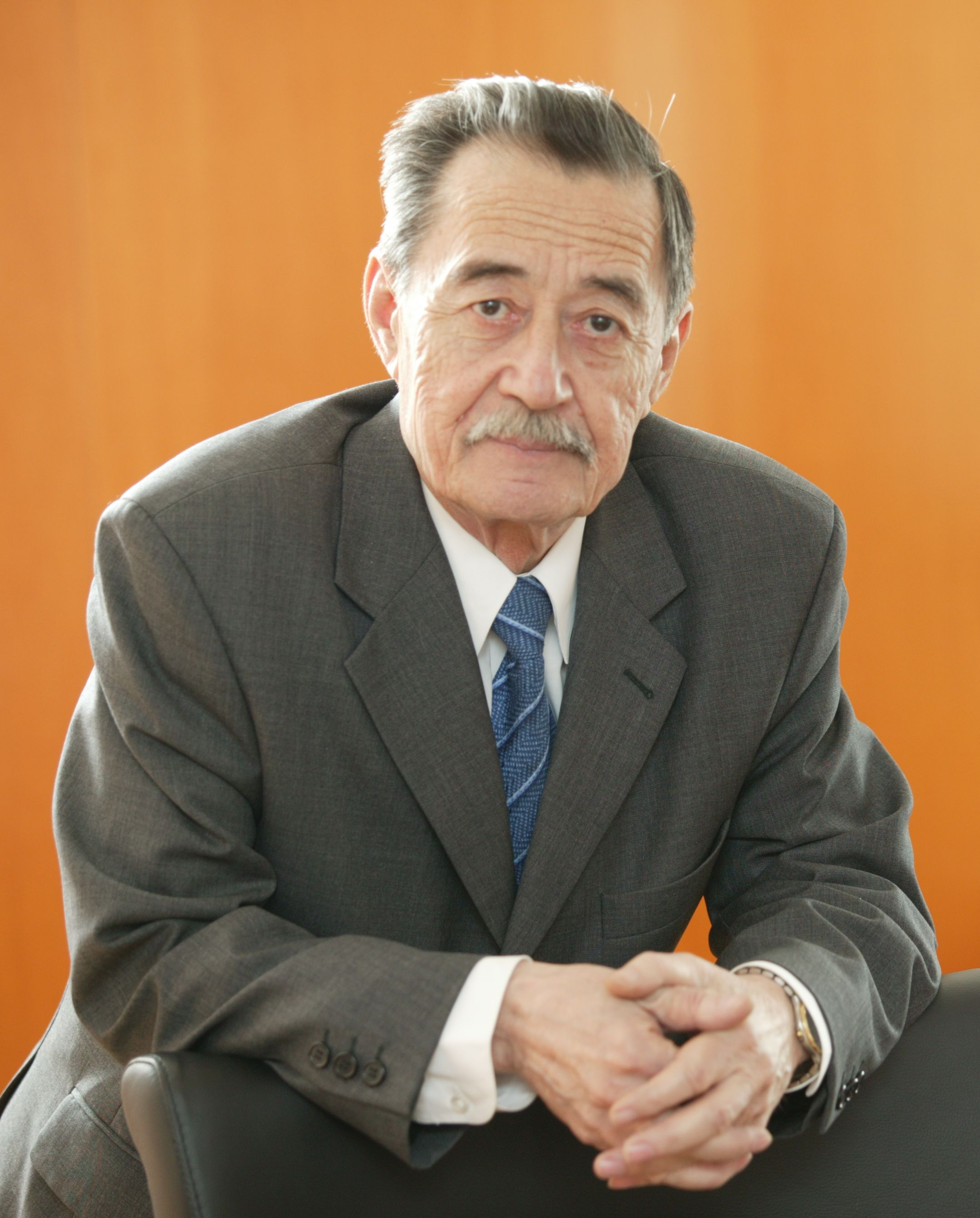
- Sembaev in 2004

First Deputy Prime Minister of Kazakhstan
- In office 6 February 1992 – 17 December 1993 Serving with Oleg Soskovets
- Prime Minister: Sergey Tereshchenko
- Preceded by: Yevgeny Yozhikov-Babakhanov
- Succeeded by: Akezhan Kazhegeldin

Deputy Prime Minister of Kazakhstan
- In office 16 October 1991 – 6 February 1992
- Prime Minister: Uzakbay Karamanov

Member of the Senate
- In office 24 January 1996 – May 1997

2nd Chairman of the National Bank of Kazakhstan
- In office 17 December 1993 – 10 January 1996
- President: Nursultan Nazarbayev
- Preceded by: Galym Bainazarov
- Succeeded by: Oraz Jandosov

Personal details
- Born: 10 August 1935 Alma-Ata, Kazakh ASSR, Soviet Union
- Died: 15 November 2021 (aged 86)
- Party: Aq Jol (2002–2005)
- Spouse: Maia Sembaeva
- Children: 2
- Education: Satbayev University

Däulet Hamitūly Sembaev (Kazakh Cyrillic: Дәулет Хамитұлы Сембаев; 10 August 1935 – 15 November 2021) was a Kazakh politician and financier, who was the First Deputy Prime Minister of Kazakhstan from 1992 to 1993 and the Deputy Prime Minister of Kazakhstan from 1991 to 1992. He served as the chairman of the National Bank of Kazakhstan from 1993 until 1996, when he was appointed as a member of the Kazakh Senate.

Although being a metallurgist by profession, Sembaev worked in various state financial positions in the early years of Kazakhstan's independence where he oversaw the formation of the newly sovereign national currency which earned him a nickname as the "father of tenge", implementation of the pension reforms, and heading the Kazakh National Bank, Kazkommertsbank, and the Kazakh Association of Financiers. To this day, Sembaev is viewed as one of the founders of the modern Kazakh financial system.

== Biography ==
=== Early life and education ===
Sembaev was born to a Kazakh Muslim family in the city of Alma-Ata (now Almaty, Kazakhstan). His first name means "fortune" or "property" in the Persian, Kazakh, and Urdu languages. Daulet's father, Hamid Sembaev, was a teacher who later became the People's Commissioner and Minister of Education of the Kazakh SSR.

In 1958, Daulet graduated from the Institute of Metallurgy and Industrial Engineering in the Satbayev University, specializing in metallurgical engineering.

=== Career ===
From 1958 to 1966, he was a foundry technologist, senior foreman of the black casting section of the S. M. Kirov Alma-Ata machine-building plant. From 1966 to 1975, Sembaev served as a chief specialist, head of a sub-department, and the deputy head of a department of the State Planning Committee of the Kazakh SSR. In 1975, he became the head of the Secretariat of the Chairman of the Council of Ministers of the Kazakh SSR. From 1979, Sembaev served as the Deputy Chief Executive Officer of the Council of Ministers of the Kazakh SSR. In 1983, he became the head of the Department of the State Planning Committee of the Kazakh SSR. From 1987, Sembaev was the deputy chairman of the State Planning Committee of the Kazakh SSR. In November 1990, he became the deputy chairman of the Supreme Economic Council of the Kazakh SSR.

On 16 October 1991, Sembaev was appointed the Deputy Prime Minister of Kazakhstan. From 6 February 1992, he served as the First Deputy Prime Minister of Kazakhstan where he headed the State Commission during the introduction of the Kazakhstani tenge until he was dismissed on 17 December 1993 and replaced by Akejan Kajegeldin. That same day, Sembaev became the chairman of the National Bank of Kazakhstan. During that time, Sembaev faced serious challenges in regards with the Kazakh economy which dealt with financial crisis. Sembaev took initiatives to tighten the requirements for the structure of authorized banking funds, forming supervision based on international principles and standards to ensure the stability of the tenge. Under Sembaev's leadership of the National Bank, Kazakhstan began forming its own macroeconomic policies.

On 24 January 1996, he became a member of the Senate of Kazakhstan. From there, he served as the chairman of the Committee on Economy, Finance and Budget until May 1997, when he became the Deputy Board of Directors of OJSC Gornorudnaya ABS–Balkhash.

=== Post political career ===
In April 1999, Sembaev became the chairman of the Board of Directors of Kazkommertsbank JSC. From 28 May 1999 to 7 December 2001, he headed the Association of Financiers of Kazakhstan. In September 2002, Sembaev became the deputy chairman of the Board of Directors of Kazkommertsbank JSC. On 31 January 2003, he became the head of the Association of Financiers again until 16 April 2004.

Sembaev was one of the founders of the Aq Jol Democratic Party, a moderate faction which split itself from the Democratic Choice of Kazakhstan in 2002. In the 2004 legislative elections, Sembaev was included in the Ak Zhol party list for the contesting seat in the Mäjilis.

Since 8 August 2005, Sembaev has been an Honorary Chairman of the Council of the Association of Financiers and from 23 December 2009, as a member of the Board of Trustees of the International Academy of Business. On 1 August 2011, it was revealed that Sembaev resigned from his post as a member of the Board of Directors of Kazkommertsbank JSC.

== Death ==
On 15 November 2021, it was reported that Sembaev had died at the age of 86, subsequently the same day as National Currency Day of Kazakhstan was being celebrated. According to Sembaev's close friends, Daulet himself died peacefully in his home while surrounded by relatives. As a result of his passing, condolences were expressed by Kazakh President Kassym-Jomart Tokayev and former President Nursultan Nazarbayev in a letter saying how Sembaev was "highly respected by many" and that "his bright image" will always be remembered by the public.
