= 1996 in Kazakhstan =

- Decades: 1990s; 2000s; 2010s
- See also: Other events of 1996; Timeline of Kazakhstani history

Events in the year 1996 in Kazakhstan.

== Incumbents ==
- President: Nursultan Nazarbayev
- Prime Minister: Akezhan Kazhegeldin

== Events ==
=== May ===
- May 23 – The L. N. Gumilyov Eurasian National University was established.

=== July ===
- July 19 – Kazakhstan takes part in the Summer Olympic Games in Atlanta as an independent country for the first time.

=== August ===
- August 16 – 13 athletes from Kazakhstan take part in the opening ceremony of the 1996 Summer Paralympics in Atlanta.

=== November ===
- November 8 – The Prince of Wales (now Charles III) visits Almaty during his royal tour of Central Asia.

=== December ===
- December 16 – The first military parade in honour of the Independence Day of Kazakhstan was held on the Republic Square in Almaty.
- December 17 – The Suleyman Demirel University was opened by Kazakh President Nursultan Nazarbayev, and former Turkish President Suleyman Demirel.
