= Republican People's Party (Kazakhstan) =

Republican People's Party of Kazakhstan Қазақстан Республикалық Халық партиясы
- Abbreviation: QRHP
- Leader: Akezhan Kazhegeldin
- Deputy Chairman: Amirjan Qosanov
- Founded: 17 December 1998; 27 years ago
- Dissolved: 25 December 2001; 24 years ago
- Merged into: United Democratic Party
- Ideology: Social liberalism Social democracy

The Republican People's Party of Kazakhstan (QRHP) was an unregistered political party in Kazakhstan that existed from 1998 to 2001. The party was led by ex-Prime Minister of Kazakhstan Akezhan Kazhegeldin. The goal of the QRHP was to establish a democratic state with a socially oriented market economy. However, despite all the attempts, the party was never registered.

The QRHP, along with the People's Congress of Kazakhstan and Democratic Party Azamat was merged into United Democratic Party on 25 December 2001.
