= Saparhan Omarov =

Kazakh politician (born 1968)

- Сапархан Омаров
- Omarov in 2020

Minister of Agriculture
- In office 25 February 2019 – 10 July 2021
- President: Nursultan Nazarbayev; Kassym-Jomart Tokayev
- Prime Minister: Askar Mamin
- Preceded by: Umirzak Shukeyev
- Succeeded by: Erbol Qaraşukeev (Acting)

Member of the Mäjilis
- In office 20 March 2016 – 25 February 2019

Personal details
- Born: 5 May 1968 (age 58) Otrabat, Kazakh SSR, Soviet Union
- Party: Nur Otan
- Spouse: Ainur Dauletberdieva
- Children: 3
- Education: Plekhanov Russian University of Economics; KAZGUU University

Military service
- Allegiance: Soviet Union
- Branch/service: Soviet Army
- Years of service: 1986–1988

Saparhan Kesıkbaiūly Omarov (Kazakh: Сапархан Кесікбайұлы Омаров; born 5 May 1968) is a Kazakh politician who served as the Minister of Agriculture from 2019 to 2021. Prior to that, he served as the member of the Mäjilis from 2016 to 2019 and Vice Minister of Agriculture from 2014 to 2016.

== Biography ==
=== Early life and career ===
Omarov was born at a railway station in the village of Utrabat. From 1986 to 1988, he served in the Soviet Army. In 1995 Omarov graduated from the Plekhanov Russian University of Economics with a degree in economics. In 2001 he graduated from the KAZGUU University with a degree in law.

From 1995 to 1996, Omarov was a specialist and the head of the department of the National Commission of Kazakhstan. In 2001 he became the head of department of the Food Contract Corporation CJSC. From 2001 to 2006 he served as the company's director of the Department and the Managing Director. In 2006 Omarov became the Vice President of Food Contract Corporation JSC. From 2007 to 2008 he served as the deputy head of the Household Management Department of the Parliament at the Office of the President of Kazakhstan. In 2008 Omarov became the state inspector of the Department of State Control and Territorial Organizational Work of the Administration of the President. From 2011 to 2014 he was a member of the Accounts Committee for Control over Execution of the Republican Budget.

=== Political career ===
On 1 April 2014, Omarov was appointed as the Vice Minister of Agriculture of Kazakhstan. He served that position until he became the member of the Mäjilis shortly after the 2016 legislative elections.

On 25 February 2019, Omarov was appointed as the Minister of Agriculture after the previous government was dismissed. On 10 July 2021, President Kassym-Jomart Tokayev called for resignation of Omarov, citing his failure in dealing with a drought which severely affected the Mangystau and Kyzylorda regions that resulted in deaths of cattle and the inflated prices for livestock products. That same day under a presidential decree, Omarov was relieved from his post. From there, he was subsequently replaced by Erbol Qaraşukeev whom became an acting Agriculture Minister.

== Awards and titles ==
- 2020 (December 3) — Order of Parasat;
- 2013 — Order of Kurmet;
- 2008 — Honorary Citizen of the city of Turkestan;
- 2010 — Awarded with a graceful letter of the Republic of Kazakhstan.

=== Public anniversary medals ===
- 2001 — Medal "10 years of independence of the Republic of Kazakhstan";
- 2004 — Medal "50 year of Celine";
- 2008 — Medal "10 years of Astana";
- 2011 — Medal "20 years of independence of the Republic of Kazakhstan"
- 2016 — Medal "25 years of independence of the Republic of Kazakhstan"
- 2018 — Medal "20 years of Astana".
