= Engels Gabbasov =

Kazakh politician and writer (1937–2014)

Engels Ğabbasov
- Энгельс Ғаббасов

Senator for West Kazakhstan Region
- In office 5 December 1995 – 17 September 1999 Serving with Viktor Baldin, Amangeldi Taspihov
- Preceded by: Office established
- Succeeded by: Rashit Ahmetov

Member of the Supreme Soviet of Kazakhstan
- In office 7 March 1994 – 11 March 1995

Personal details
- Born: 17 January 1937 Furmanova, West Kazakhstan Region, Kazakh SSR, Soviet Union
- Died: 11 July 2014 (aged 77) Oral, Kazakhstan
- Party: People's Union of Kazakhstan Unity
- Other political affiliations: QKP (until 1991)
- Education: West Kazakhstan State University; Higher Party School; Academy of Sciences of the Soviet Union

Engels Ğabbasūly Ğabbasov (Kazakh: Энгельс Ғаббасұлы Ғаббасов; 17 January 1937 – 11 July 2014) was a Kazakh politician and writer who was a Senator for West Kazakhstan Region from 1995 to 1999. Prior to that, he was a member of the Supreme Soviet of Kazakhstan from 1994 to 1995. Ğabbasov was a candidate in the 1999 Kazakh presidential election for the People's Union of Kazakhstan Unity.

== Early life and education ==
Ğabbasov was born in 1937 in the village of Furmanova (now Jalpaqtal) in a family of six children. In 1957, he graduated from the West Kazakhstan State University in Oral with a degree in Russian language and literature then in 1966, he graduated from the Higher Party School with a degree in journalism. In 1976, Ğabbasov completed his postgraduate studies at the Academy of Sciences of the Soviet Union in the direction of criticism and literary criticism. That same year, he earned candidacy in philology with his dissertation topic: "The artistic concept of personality in a modern historical-revolutionary novel".

== Career ==
Ğabbasov began his career as a teacher and the head of the Department of the Regional Library in 1957. From 1966 to 1973, he worked as an instructor and the head of the Political Education House of the Oral Regional Party Committee. In 1976, Ğabbasov became the head of the lecturer group of the Regional Party Committee. From 1988 to 1991, he served as rector of the University of Marxism-Leninism under the Regional Party Committee until he became the referent and the head of Department of the West Kazakhstan Regional Council. In 1993, Ğabbasov was appointed as the head of the Department of the West Kazakhstan Regional Administration.

In 1994, he was elected as a member of the Supreme Soviet of Kazakhstan. From there, he was a member of the Committee on Culture, Press, Mass Media and Public Associations. On 5 December 1995, Ğabbasov was then elected as one of the first Senators for West Kazakhstan Region where he was member of the Committee on International Affairs, Defense and Security.

=== 1999 presidential campaign ===
On 22 October 1998, while serving as a Senator, Ğabbasov launched his bid for presidency for the People's Union of Kazakhstan Unity. On 30 November 1998, he was registered by the Central Election Commission as a candidate.

Although Ğabbasov had no rallies and only gave a limited amount of press interviews, he maintained a strong support mostly from rural areas. Ğabbasov ran on campaign mostly on environmental issues such as proposing to close the Baikonur Cosmodrome, claiming that it was harming the environment, as well as eliminate public health hazards and boost economic reforms. He also promised to create flexible system of farm subsidies and grant tax privileges to agricultural workers, as well as benefits for women with many children, continue in providing free secondary education and vocational training for young people and maintain free healthcare. At the same time, Ğabbasov avoided in criticizing President Nursultan Nazarbayev. Ğabbasov also favored for closer economic ties with Russia and the CIS. He received 0.77% of the votes in the election, placing him in last place among other candidates.

== Later life and death ==
After retiring from politics in 1999, Ğabbasov continued enjoying his creative hobbies. In his last years, he felt very ill and eventually died on 11 July 2014 in his hometown of Oral at the age of 78 which his death only confirmed almost week later.

== Bibliography ==
Member of the Writers' Union of Kazakhstan, Ğabbasov is the author of ten collections of novellas and short stories:

- A free horse for the jigit (Свободная лошадь для джигита, 1969)
- One tree for the whole steppe (Одно дерево на всю степь, 1976)
- That summer and this winter (В то лето и эту зиму, 1980, 1988)
- Green leaf in the snow (Зеленый лист на снегу, 1982)
- Little boy and two men (Маленький мальчик и двое мужчин, 1983)
- Love story (История любви, 1984)
- There are no unforeseen barriers (Нет непредвиденных преград, 1989)
