= Yevgeny Yozhikov-Babakhanov =

Soviet-Kazakh politician (1942–2023)

- Евгений Ёжиков-Бабаханов

First Deputy Prime Minister of Kazakhstan
- In office 16 December 1991 – 6 February 1992
- Prime Minister: Sergey Tereshchenko
- Preceded by: Office established
- Succeeded by: Daulet Sembaev; Oleg Soskovets

Deputy Prime Minister of Kazakhstan
- In office 6 February 1992 – 18 January 1993
- Prime Minister: Sergey Tereshchenko

Member of the Congress of People's Deputies of the USSR
- In office 26 March 1989 – 24 December 1990

Minister of Special Construction and Installation Works of the Kazakh SSR
- In office 1985–1988

Member of the Supreme Soviet of the Kazakh SSR
- In office 24 February 1980 – 1985

Personal details
- Born: 15 May 1942 Saratov, Russian SFSR, USSR
- Died: 12 August 2023 (aged 81) Almaty, Kazakhstan
- Party: Communist Party of the Soviet Union (1965–1991)
- Education: Lviv Polytechnic Institute; All-Union Civil Engineering Institute of Distance Learning; Russian Presidential Academy of National Economy and Public Administration

Yevgeny Georgiyevich Yozhikov-Babakhanov (Russian: Евгений Георгиевич Ёжиков-Бабаханов, 12 May 1942 – 12 August 2023) was a Soviet and Kazakh politician who served as a member of the Supreme Soviet of the Kazakh SSR from 1980 to 1989, member of the Congress of People's Deputies of the Soviet Union from 1989 to 1991, First Deputy Prime Minister of Kazakhstan from June 1991 to February 1992 and Deputy Prime Minister of Kazakhstan from February 1992 to January 1993.

== Early life and education ==
Yozhikov-Babakhanov was born in Saratov in present-day Russia. In 1965, he graduated from the Lviv Polytechnic Institute with a degree in electrical engineering, later in 1978, from the All-Union Civil Engineering Institute of Distance Learning with a degree in engineer-economist and Russian Presidential Academy of National Economy and Public Administration in 1981.

== Career ==
In 1965, Yozhikov-Babakhanov became a member of the Communist Party of the Soviet Union (CPSU). From 1969, he worked in the party and Soviet bodies of the Kazakh SSR. In 1980, Yozhikov-Babakhanov was elected as a member of the Supreme Soviet of the Kazakh SSR of the 10th convocation. In 1985, he became a Minister of Installation and Special Construction Works of the Kazakh SSR and from 1988, Yozhikov-Babakhanov served as a First Secretary of the Dzhezkazgan Regional Committee of the CPSU. He was elected in the 1989 Soviet Union legislative election as a member of the Congress of People's Deputies of the Soviet Union until being appointed the State Counselor of Kazakh SSR on Construction, Science and Regional Development on 24 December 1990, then as First Deputy Prime Minister of Kazakh SSR on 25 June 1991.

On December 16, 1991, he became the First Deputy Prime Minister of Kazakhstan.

On 6 February 1992, Yozhikov-Babakhanov was relieved of his post as the First Deputy and became the Deputy Prime Minister of Kazakhstan. He served that position until he was appointed the chairman of the Main Control Inspectorate under the President of the Republic of Kazakhstan on 18 January 1993. He was relieved of that post on 24 November 1993.

== Personal life and death ==
As of 2020 Yozhikov-Babakhanov resided in Almaty and served as the chairman of the board of directors and President of CJSC Montazhspetsstroy. He died on 12 August 2023, at the age of 81.
