= United Democratic Party (Kazakhstan) =

- Abbreviation: UDP
- Leader: Collective leadership
- Founded: 25 December 2001; 23 years ago
- Merger of: Democratic Party of Azamat; People's Congress; QRHP
- Ideology: Parliamentarianism; Unicameralism; Anti-authoritarianism; Decentralization
- Slogan: Kazakhstan without Nazarbayev

The United Democratic Party is an unregistered political party in Kazakhstan.

== History ==
It was founded on 25 December 2001 with the merger of People's Congress of Kazakhstan, Republican People's Party of Kazakhstan, and the Azamat Democratic Party. The main reason was due to a need of a stronger, united opposition.

Its Congress was held in January 2002. It did not participate in the 2004 Kazakh legislative election due to lack of funds.

== Program ==
The UDP advocated for a unicameral parliamentary republic, elections at local level, and snap elections for president and the parliament.
