= Rufina Isakova =

Soviet and Kazakh scientist

- Born: Rufina Afanasyevna Isakova; 23 June 1924; Sarkand, Turkestan ASSR, USSR
- Died: 2016 (aged 91–92); Kazakhstan
- Education: Satbayev University
- Occupation: Scientist

Rufina Afanasyevna Isakova (23 June 1924 - 2016) was a Soviet and Kazakh scientist, Doctor of Technical Sciences (1971), professor (1971), academic of the Kazakhstan Academy of Sciences (2003), and an Honored Scientist of the Kazakh SSR (1977).

== Education ==
Isakova was born on June 23, 1924, in Sarkand, Turkestan ASSR, USSR (now Almaty Region, Kazakhstan). In 1947, she graduated from the Kazakh Mining and Metallurgy Institute (now Satbayev University).

== Career and research ==
From 1947-1991, she was a laboratory assistant, then a scientific researcher, and finally the head of the laboratory of the Institute of Metallurgy and Mining Technology at the Academy of Sciences of Kazakhstan. In 1991, she became the head scientific consultant in the Institute.

Isakova contributed major scientific works in the field of vacuum metallurgy of non-ferrous metals. She developed highly effective technologies for the complex re-casting of polimetallic raw materials, making adaptations for the metallurgical factories of Shymkent, Oskemen.

She was the author of numerous metallurgical publications, and is credited with over 20 patents to her name.

== Death ==
Isakova died in 2016.

== Awards and recognition ==
- Order of the Badge of Honour (20 July 1984)
- Honored Scientist of the Kazakh SSR (1977)
