= Uzakbay Karamanov =

Prime Minister of Kazakhstan (1937–2017)

- Ұзақбай Қараманов

Prime Minister of the Kazakh SSR
- In office 20 November 1990 – 16 October 1991
- President: Nursultan Nazarbayev
- Preceded by: Office established; he himself as the Chairman of the Council of Ministers of the Kazakh SSR
- Succeeded by: Sergey Tereshchenko

Chairman of the Council of Ministers of the Kazakh SSR
- In office 27 July 1989 – 20 November 1990
- Chairman: Nursultan Nazarbayev
- Preceded by: Nursultan Nazarbayev
- Succeeded by: Office abolished; he himself as the Prime Minister of the Kazakh SSR

Personal details
- Born: August 20, 1937 Aral District, Kyzylorda Region, Kazakh SSR, Soviet Union
- Died: September 25, 2017 (aged 80) Almaty, Kazakhstan
- Spouse: Uldai Rametollaqyzy (m. 1960)
- Children: 3
- Education: Samara State Architectural-Construction University (1959)
- Occupation: Politician
- Awards: See list: Order of the Leopard; Order of the Red Banner of Labour; Hero of Socialist Labour; Order of Otan

Uzakbay Karamanuly Karamanov (Kazakh: Ұзақбай Қараманұлы Қараманов, Ūzaqbai Qaramanūly Qaramanov) or Uzakbay Karamanovich Karamanov (Russian: Узакбай Караманович Караманов; 20 August 1937 – 25 September 2017) was a Soviet politician who served as the last premier of the Kazakh Soviet Socialist Republic from 1989 to 1991.
