= Sergey Tereshchenko =

Prime Minister of Kazakhstan (1951–2023)

- Сергей Терещенко
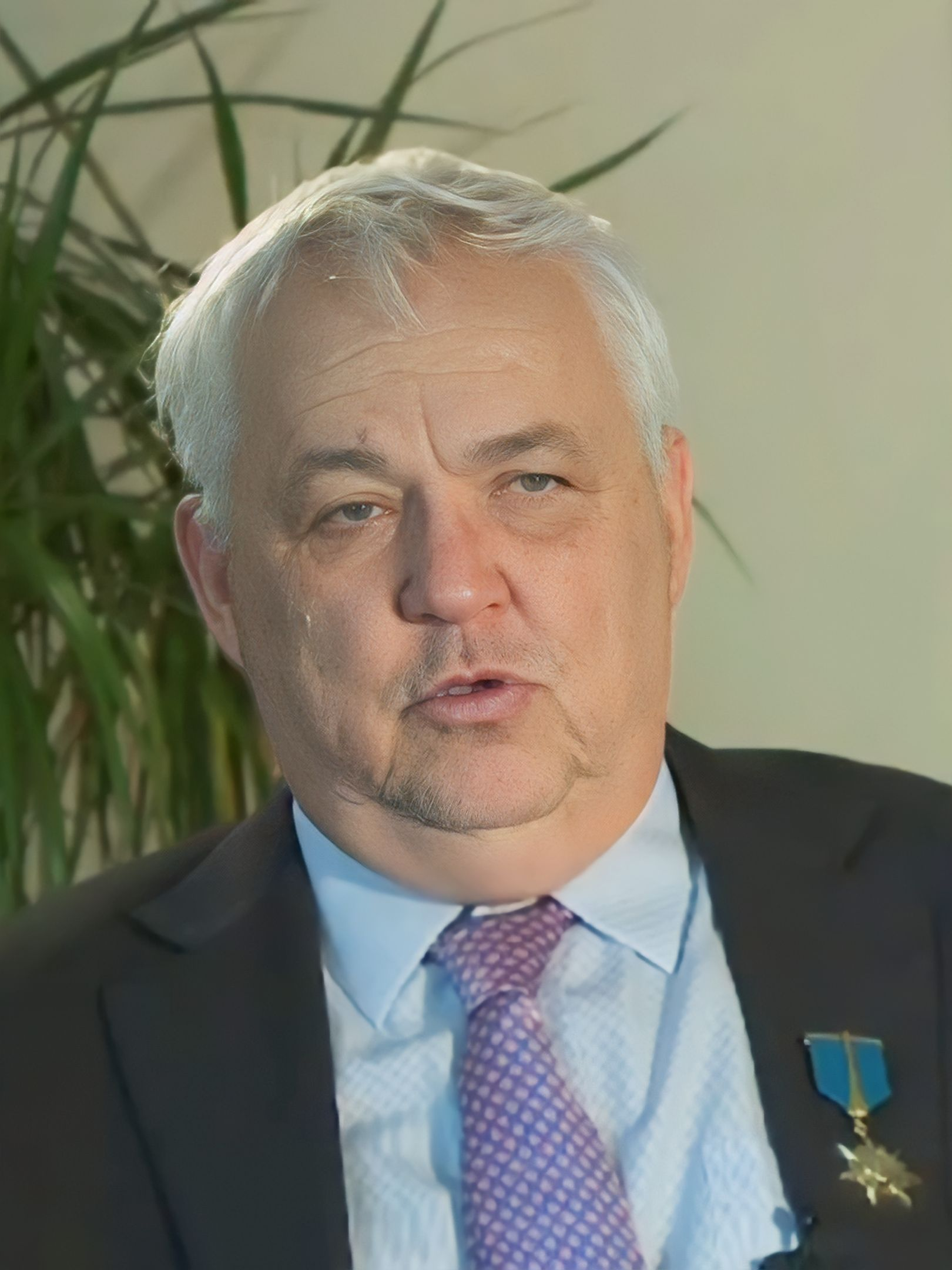
- Tereshchenko in 2016

1st Prime Minister of Kazakhstan
- In office 16 December 1991 – 12 October 1994
- President: Nursultan Nazarbayev
- First Deputy: Yevgeny Ezhikov-Babakhanov; Oleg Soskovets; Daulet Sembaev; Akezhan Kazhegeldin
- Preceded by: Office established; he himself as the Prime Minister of the Kazakh SSR
- Succeeded by: Akezhan Kazhegeldin

Prime Minister of the Kazakh SSR
- In office 16 October 1991 – 16 December 1991
- President: Nursultan Nazarbayev
- Preceded by: Uzakbay Karamanov
- Succeeded by: Office abolished; he himself as the Prime Minister of Kazakhstan

Chairman of Otan
- Acting
- In office 1 March 1999 – 21 October 2002
- Leader: Nursultan Nazarbayev
- Preceded by: Office established
- Succeeded by: Amangeldı Ermegiaev

Personal details
- Born: Sergey Alexandrovich Tereshchenko; 30 March 1951 Lesozavodsk, Primorsky Krai, Russian SFSR, USSR
- Died: 10 February 2023 (aged 71)
- Party: Amanat (from 1999)
- Other political affiliations: CPSU (until 1991); Independent (1991–1999)
- Spouse: Yevgenia Tereshchenko
- Children: 2

Sergey Alexandrovich Tereshchenko (Cyrillic: Сергей Александрович Терещенко; 30 March 1951 – 10 February 2023) was a Soviet and Kazakh politician. He served as the Prime Minister of Kazakhstan from 1991 to 1994 and later as the acting chairman of Otan from 1999 to 2002.

== Life and career ==
Tereshchenko was born in the town of Lesozavodsk, which was in the Primorsky Krai of the Russian Soviet Federative Socialist Republic. In 1969, he moved to the Kazakh Soviet Socialist Republic, where he studied mechanical engineering at the Kazakh National Agrarian University, where he graduated in 1973. After graduation, Tereshchenko was sent to work as chief engineer of the collective farm in Shymkent (known at the time as Chimkent). In 1975, he was elected First Secretary of the Tulkubas District Komsomol Committee, where he worked for four years. In the seven years after leaving the post, Tereshchenko served as the head local party/executive positions in Shymkent.

In the spring of 1990, Tereshchenko served as deputy chairman of the Supreme Soviet of the Kazakh SSR. For about one and a half years after leaving that post, he was the first secretary of the Communist Party Central Committee in Chimkent. He briefly elected by Supreme Council as Vice President of the Kazakh SSR from April to May 1990. In the remaining months of 1991, Tereshchenko assumed the post of Prime Minister of the Kazakh SSR. When the country gained independence on 16 December, he was appointed to the newly created post of Prime Minister. During his tenure, his government began work to privatize formerly state-run companies. He also proposed strengthening executive power in order to bring about economic reforms in the country.

In late May 1994, Tereshchenko suffered a defeat when the Parliament of Kazakhstan passed a vote of no confidence in the Tereshchenko Government. He held out for several months until he was dismissed by President Nursultan Nazarbayev on 12 October following a corruption scandal involving his Minister of Internal Affairs that month. Akezhan Kazhegeldin was chosen to be Tereshchenko's successor, which followed his retirement from public service. After his dismissal, he served as the President of the International Foundation "Integration", the main goal of which is the start of an integration process of Kazakhstan into the economic, political, and cultural space of world stage. In 1998, he was among those supporting the re-election of Nursultan Nazarbayev for the presidency.

== Personal life and death ==
Tereshchenko was an ethnic Ukrainian and was one of the first from his ethnicity to take office in independent Kazakhstan. His wife, Yevgenia Grigorievna, was a Russian language teacher of literature. They had two daughters, Nina and Elena.

Tereshchenko died on 10 February 2023, at the age of 71.

== Awards ==
- Hero of Labor (2012)
- Order of Otan (2012)
- Presidential Peace and Spiritual Consent Award (1999)
- Order of Friendship 1st Degree (1999)
- Order of Barys 2nd Degree (2005)
- Order of Friendship (2004) (Russian Federation)
- Order "Alғys" (2012) (Russian Orthodox Church, Metropolitan Church of Kazakhstan)
- Honorary Citizen of the South Kazakhstan Region
- Freedom of the city of Almaty (2014)
- Honorary Citizen of the City of Almaty
- Presidential Prize for Peace and Spiritual Consent of the Republic of Kazakhstan (1999)

Political offices
Preceded by Position created	Prime Minister of Kazakhstan; 1991–1994	Succeeded by Akezhan Kazhegeldin
