= Kazakhgate =

Bribery scandal involving oil fields in Kazakhstan

Kаzаkhgаtе refers to the scandal surrounding James Giffen, an American businessman and former advisor of Kazakhstan president Nursultan Nazarbayev.

== Charges ==
US prosecutors accused Giffen of bribery paid to Nazarbayev and Nurlan Balgimbayev, former Prime Minister of Kazakhstan, to secure contracts over the Tengiz oil fields for Western companies in the 1990s. James Giffen was arrested in 2003 at John F. Kennedy International Airport in New York while attempting to board a plane to Paris, though in doing so it was later learned he was not attempting to flee the country. He had a return ticket and it was a normal planned business trip. He was charged by the US attorney's office of the Southern District of New York with violation of the Foreign Corrupt Practices Act of 1974 and with money laundering. He was carrying a Kazakhstani diplomatic passport, though dual citizenship is not allowed by the laws of Kazakhstan. The attorney's office also charged J. Bryan Williams III, a former Mobil executive, with tax evasion relating to kickbacks from Mobil's business in Kazakhstan.

According to the federal bribery charges, Giffen was accused of creating Swiss bank accounts and transferring $20 million, paying tuition at exclusive boarding schools for family members of Kazakh officials, and buying millions of dollars in jewelry. Giffen's lawyers assert that Giffen was acting with the full knowledge and approval of the US government. Giffen requested access to classified information at his trial to back up his claims. The government opposed the revelation of classified information.

== Reaction ==
Kazakhstan officially said that the charges had nothing to do with their country as they concern an American citizen, though several American attorneys addressed the US Department of Justice on behalf of Kazakhstan. They requested to stop the proceedings taking into account the strategic importance of US relations with Kazakhstan.

== Trial ==
In the Kazakhgate trial, Giffen asserted that he was acting with the approval of the CIA, which refused to release secret papers relating to these activities. His defense said Giffen had merely been following orders from the Kazakh government, which as a foreign state had the right to define legality according to its own views, and serving the interests of the United States.

In August 2010, Giffen pleaded guilty to a tax misdemeanor under anti-corruption laws; the other charges, which could have carried a penalty of several decades in prison, were dropped. Mercator Corporation, which is owned by Giffen, pleaded guilty to one count of making an unlawful payment to a senior government official of the Republic of Kazakhstan, in violation of the Foreign Corrupt Practices Act.

The case concluded in November 2010; U.S. District Judge William Pauley, who said he had been able to refer to classified documents that had not been made public in the trial, ordered neither prison time nor a fine for Giffen.

== Kаzаkhgаtе in fiction ==
According to the Financial Times, James Giffen is referenced by former CIA agent Robert Baer in his book See No Evil as "Mr. Kazakhstan" for his ability to influence oil policy in that country. George Clooney produced the film "Syriana" based on this book. Tim Blake Nelson played the fictional character Danny Dalton which was loosely based on James Giffen.

In the espionage novel Performance Anomalies by Victor Robert Lee, a fictional premier of Kazakhstan is tied to "an action before a U.S. federal court alleging violations of the U.S. Foreign Corrupt Practices Act in a case dubbed 'Kazakhgate' concerning the sale of rights to the country's abundant oil fields."
