= Nurtas Undasynov =

Soviet politician

- Нұртас Оңдасынов

Chairman of the Supreme Soviet of the Kazakh SSR
- In office 23 March 1954 – 31 March 1955
- Preceded by: Daniyal Kerimbayev
- Succeeded by: Zhumabek Tashenev

Chairman of the Council of Ministers of the Kazakh SSR
- In office 17 July 1938 – September 1951
- Preceded by: Ibragim Tazhiyev
- Succeeded by: Elubay Taybekov

Personal details
- Born: Nurtas Dandibayevich Undasynov; 26 October 1904 Uchkayuk, Russian Empire
- Died: 1 November 1989 (aged 85) Moscow, Soviet Union
- Party: CPSU
- Education: Tashkent Institute of Irrigation and Agricultural Mechanization Engineers; Higher Party School

Nūrtas Dändıbaiūly Oñdasynov (Note: Often transliterated as Nurtas Dandibayevich Undasynov through the Russified Romanization of Russian: Нуртас Дандибаевич Ундасынов) (Kazakh: Нұртас Дәндібайұлы Ондасынов; 13 October 1904 – 1 November 1989) was a Soviet politician, who served as Chairman of the Council of Ministers of the Kazakh SSR (1938–1951), Chairman of the Presidium of the Supreme Council of the Kazakh SSR (1954–1955).

== Biography ==
Undasynov was born on 13 October 1904 in the village of Uchkayuk (now the village of Nurtas) near Turkestan, present-day Turkistan Region. He comes from the Jetimder clan of the Qonyrat tribe. Since 1916, he worked in Tashkent.

In 1926, he joined the Communist Party of the Soviet Union. In 1927, he graduated from the Tashkent Forestry College. From 1930 to 1934, he studied at the Central Asian Irrigation Institute in Tashkent.

In 1938, Undasynov was the Chairman of the East Kazakhstan Regional Executive Committee.

Undasynov served as Chairman of the Council of People's Commissars (in 1946 renamed to the Council of Ministers of the Kazakh SSR) from 17 July 1938 to September 1951. For ten years, Dinmukhamed Kunayev worked as Undasynov's deputy in the Council of People's Commissars of the Kazakh SSR. Throughout his life, he considered Undasynov his mentor and felt his constant support.

Then, for two years, Undasynov studied at the Higher Party School in Moscow.

He served as Chairman of the Presidium of the Supreme Soviet of the Kazakh SSR from January 1954 to 31 March 1955.

Since May 1955, at his own request, Undasynov became the chairman of the Guryev Regional Executive Committee, and since January 1957, the first secretary of the Guryev Regional Committee of the Communist Party of Kazakhstan.

Undasynov was a Member of the Supreme Soviet of the Soviet Union, from 1st to 4th convocations.

He retired in 1962, and engaged in scientific work in the field of Oriental studies. He spent his years in Moscow, Gvardeyskaya street, 1.

According to some statements, "through his connections in the apparatus of the Central Committee of the CPSU, he recommended Nursultan Nazarbayev, who was working in the city of Temirtau at the time, to his student, the then-First Secretary of the Central Committee of the Communist Party of Kazakhstan, member of the Politburo of the Central Committee of the CPSU Dinmukhamed Kunayev, and in 1977, he organized a meeting, where Nazarbayev was with Second Secretary of the Central Committee of the CPSU Mikhail Suslov, who said goodbye to Nazarbayev: "You are safe. I will protect you".

Since 1928, Undasynov was married to Valentina Astapova and had two sons Iskander (born 1929) and Genikh (born 1936).

== Awards and titles ==
- Order of Lenin
- Order of the Red Banner of Labour
- Medal "For Valiant Labour in the Great Patriotic War 1941–1945"
- Medal "For Labour Valour"
