= Nurlan Balgimbayev =

Kazakh politician (1947–2015)

- Нұрлан Балғымбаев

3rd Prime Minister of Kazakhstan
- In office 10 October 1997 – 1 October 1999
- President: Nursultan Nazarbayev
- First Deputy: Oraz Jandosov; Akhmetzhan Yessimov; Nygmetjan Esengarin
- Preceded by: Akezhan Kazhegeldin
- Succeeded by: Kassym-Jomart Tokayev

Personal details
- Born: Nurlan Utebovich Balgimbayev; 20 November 1947 Guryev, Guryev Oblast, Kazakh SSR, Soviet Union
- Died: 14 October 2015 (aged 67) Atyrau, Atyrau Region, Kazakhstan
- Political party: People's Union of Kazakhstan Unity

Nūrlan Ötepūly Balğymbaev (Note: Often transliterated as Nurlan Utebovich Balgimbayev through a Russified Romanization of Нурлан Утебович Балгимбаев.) (Kazakh: Нұрлан Өтепұлы Балғымбаев, [no̙rɫɑ́n ɥɵtʰʲépʰʊɫə́ b̥ɑɫʁə̆mb̥ɑ́jɘf]; 20 November 1947 – 14 October 2015) was a Kazakh politician who served as the Prime Minister of Kazakhstan from 10 October 1997 to 1 October 1999.

== Biography ==
=== Early life and career ===
Balgimbayev was a graduate of the Kazakh Polytechnic Institute.

From 1973 to 1986, Nurlan Balgimbayev worked in the oil industry, beginning as chief engineer of oil refinery Zhaikneft. In 1986, he was hired by the Soviet ministry of oil and gas. With the fall of the Russian block in 1991, Balgimbayev left for the US and studied one year at the University of Massachusetts and made a one-year internship at Chevron (1993-1994).

=== Political career ===
Until 1997, he held different minister and vice-minister positions in the Kazakh government. From October 1994 to March 1997, Nurlan Balgimbayev was Minister of Oil and Gas. From March to October 1997, he was the president of KazakhOil (see Tengizchevroil).

==== Prime Minister of Kazakhstan (1997–1999) ====
On 10 October 1997, he was named Prime Minister of Kazakhstan and remained in office up until 1 October 1999. The choice for Balgimbayev was motivated by the following factors: the former prime minister Akezhan Kazhegeldin was privatizing the oil and gas sector too fast and loose, Balgimbayev was already in talks with Russians for a major Caspian pipeline, and he was an IMF-sceptic like the President Nazarbayev. Balgimbayev's plan was also to increase the production of Kazakh oil from 23 million tons to 170 million annually. In 1998, he favored the sale of 40% of Tengiz oilfields to Chevron.

=== Post-premiership ===
After his tenure as PM, he continued his career as President at state-owned KazakhOil from 1999 to 2002. Lyazzat Kiyinov replaced him after the merger between KazakhOil and Transport Nefti i Gaza companies into the new KazMunayGas. In December 2007, he was appointed adviser to the President. From 2002 to 2007, he managed his own company, the Kazakhstan Oil Investment Company. Since December 2009, Nurlan Balgimbayev had been the director general of a joint venture between KMG and Eni.

=== Death ===
On 14 October 2015, Balgimbayev died of cancer in Atyrau at the age of 68.

== Controversies ==
In 2003, the US justice linked Nurlan Balgimbayev to a $78 million bribe from US oil consultant James Giffen. Nurlan Balgimbayev was also involved in a bribery case led by oil-industry fixer Friedhelm Eronat. Coined as the Kazakhgate, the case implied the use of bribe money for luxury items and premium education fees in Switzerland.

== Notes ==
Political offices
Preceded by Akezhan Kazhegeldin	Prime Minister of Kazakhstan; 1997–1999	Succeeded by Kassym-Jomart Tokayev
