= Serikbek Daukeev =

Kazakh political figure

- Серікбек Дәукеев

Minister of Geology and Subsoil Protection
- In office 1993–1997
- Preceded by: Lev Trubnikov

Minister of Ecology, Geology, and Natural Resources
- In office 1997–1999

Minister of Natural Resources and Environmental Protection
- In office 1999–2000
- Succeeded by: Andar Shukputov

Akim of Atyrau Region
- In office 2000–2002
- Preceded by: Imangali Tasmagambetov
- Succeeded by: Aslan Musin

Personal details
- Occupation: geologist

Serikbek Zhusupbekovich Daukeev (Kazakh: Серікбек Жүсіпбекұлы Дәукеев, Serıkbek Jüsıpbekūly Däukeev) is a Kazakh politician and geologist, who held various ministerial and äkimship positions and was the President of the Kazakhstan Academy of Sciences.

== Biography ==
After graduation from Kazakh Polytechnic Institute named after Lenin (currently – Satbayev University) in Alma-Ata in 1972 with a degree in Mining Engineering and Geophysics, he joined a land seismic crew. By 1983, he had already become the Chief Engineer of Kazgeofizika (Alma-Ata Geophysical Exploration Company). In 1986 Serikbek Daukeev came to the helm of Alma-Ata Geophysical Exploration Company after completing a program in Setting Up Industrial Production under the aegis of the Ministry of Geology of the USSR. The company was tasked with implementing new geophysical technologies in Kazakhstan under the guidance of the Minister of Geology of the USSR. In 1992, Serikbek Daukeev spearheaded a reform of the whole system of subsoil resource use in his capacity as the First Deputy Minister of Geology, then Minister of Geology (between 1993 and 2000), and Minister of Natural Resources and Environmental Protection after the governmental reform. Serikbek Daukeev successfully defended his doctoral dissertation on Geology and Mineralogy in 1996. From 2000 to 2002, he held the post of akim in Atyrau Region. During his tenure as akim, he initiated a number of construction projects to change the urban landscape into a more modern style. At the same time he served on the boards of KazakhOil National Oil Company and Development Bank of Kazakhstan. In April 2002, Serikbek Daukeev chaired Satbayev University of Geological Sciences and was elected the President of the National Academy of Sciences of Kazakhstan (pursuant to presidential decree No. 849 dd. April 15, 2002). He has authored over 150 scientific publications, including 7 monographs, and received a prestigious award named after Kanysh Satbayev.

== Publications ==
Books co-authored:

- Kontinentalnye vpadiny Zentralnoy i Vostochnoy Azii (Continental Basins of Central and Eastern Asia) (1988);
- Metodika i tehnologiya vibroseismicheskih rabot s elementami vysokogo razresheniya (Methods and Technologies of Partial High-Resolution Vibroseis Acquisition) (1989).
- Konzepziya regulirovaniya i upravleniya sistem nedropolzovaniya v usloviyah rynochnoy ekonomiki (Concepts of Regulation and Management of Subsoil Resource Use in a Market Economy) (1993).

== Family ==
- Spouse — Mayrash Yermagambetovna Daukeeva (geophysicist).
- Son — Daniyar (b. 1974).
- Brother — Gumarbek Zhusupbekovich Daukee (1948—2014) (PhD, Rector Almaty University of Power Engineering and Telecommunications).
- Cousin — Dias Kenzhebekovich Daukeev (b. 1941) (Doctor of Physics and Mathematics, former Deputy Minister of Science and New Technologies, employee at KazakhOil).

== Awards ==
- Medal For Labor Valor (1986);
- Order of Kurmet (1999);
- 20 Years of Astana medal (2018).
