= Erbol Qaraşökeev =

Kazakh politician (born 1976)

- Ербол Қарашөкеев
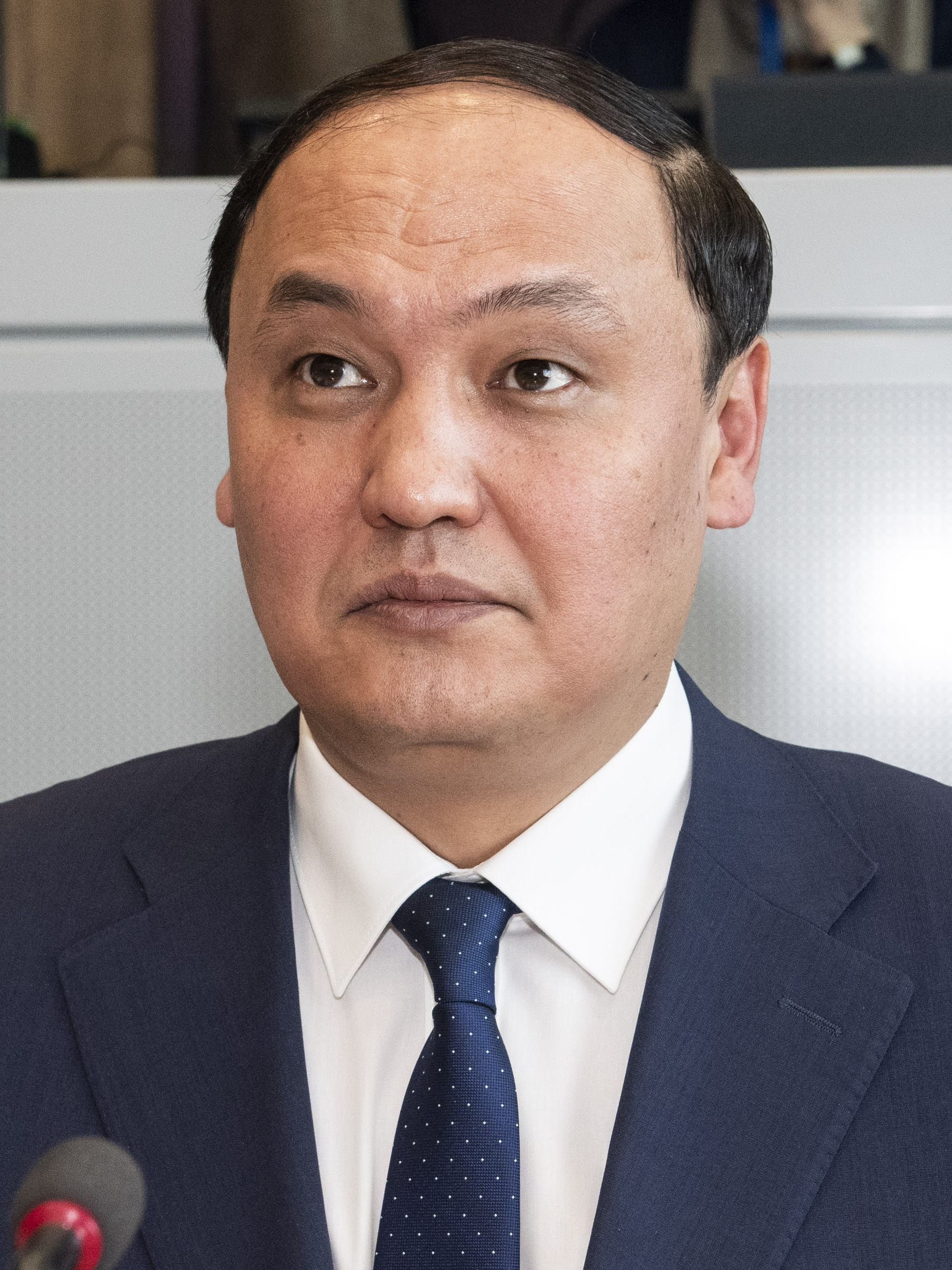
- Qaraşökeev in 2023

Akim of Jambyl Region
- Incumbent
- Assumed office 5 September 2023
- Preceded by: Nurjan Nurjigitov

Minister of Agriculture
- In office 11 January 2022 – 4 September 2023
- President: Kassym-Jomart Tokayev
- Prime Minister: Älihan Smaiylov
- Preceded by: Saparhan Omarov
- Succeeded by: Aidarbek Saparov

Deputy Minister of Finance
- In office April 2021 – July 2021
- President: Kassym-Jomart Tokayev
- Prime Minister: Älihan Smaiylov

Personal details
- Born: 1976 (age 49–50)
- Education: Al-Farabi Kazakh National University

Erbol Şyraqbaiūly Qaraşökeev (Note: Often transliterated as Yerbol Shirakbayevich Karashukeyev through a Russified Romanization of Ербол Ширакбаевич Карашукеев.) (Kazakh: Ербол Шырақбайұлы Қарашөкеев; born 1976) is a Kazakh politician, who's currently serving as akim of Jambyl Region. Before that, he was Deputy Minister of Finance of Kazakhstan and Minister of Agriculture of Kazakhstan from 2021 until 2023.

== Education and career ==
Qaraşökeev holds a master's degree in economics and a bachelor's degree in law from Al-Farabi Kazakh National University. In 2020, he was appointed chair of the management board of KazAgro Holding JSC, which he held through 2021.

He then served as the Acting Deputy Head of the Department of State Control and Organizational and Territorial Work as part of the administration of President Kassym-Jomart Tokayev.

Qaraşökeev was appointed as the Vice Minister of Finance by Prime Minister Alihan Smaiylov in April 2021, and would later succeed Saparhan Omarov as the acting Minister of Agriculture in July 2021. He would retain leadership of that ministry as the bona fide Minister of Agriculture in January 2022 until September 2023.
