= West Kazakhstan State University =

University in Oral, Kazakhstan

Mahambet Utemisov West Kazakhstan University
- Махамбет Өтемісов атындағы Батыс Қазақстан Университеті (Kazakh); Западно-Казахстанский университет имени Махамбета Утесмисова (Russian)
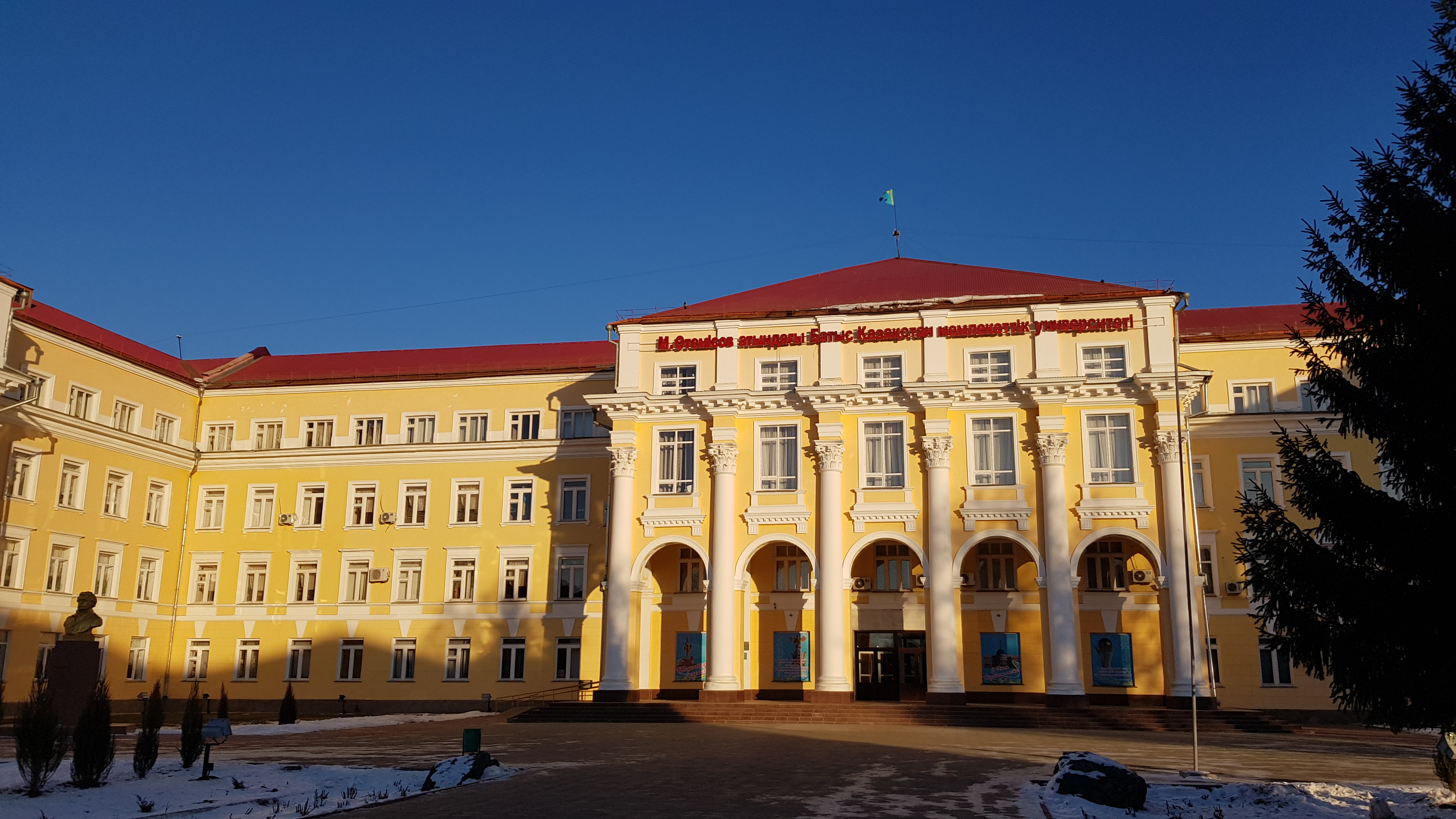
- Former names: Pushkin Oral Pedagogical Institute (1937–1996); Pushkin West Kazakhstan Humanitarian University (1996–2000)
- Type: Public
- Established: 1930
- Rector: Sergaliyev Nurlan Habibullovich
- Location: Oral, Kazakhstan; 51.19337°N 51.37620°E
- Campus: Urban
- Website: wku.edu.kz/en/

Mahambet Utemisov West Kazakhstan University (Kazakh: Махамбет Өтемісов атындағы Батыс Қазақстан Университеті, Mahambet Ötemısov atyndağy Batys Qazaqstan Universitetı; Russian: Западно-Казахстанский университет имени Махамбета Утемисова) is a multidisciplinary higher educational institution in the city of Oral. In the structure of the university there are 2 institutes, 6 faculties, 22 departments with 51 specialties, postgraduate studies, magistracy, and a college. Far away from the university, there is a big sports and football, etc playing arena.

== History ==
In 1930, the Institute of Public Education was opened in Oral, which was from Orenburg. The institute was housed in a building built in the last quarter of the 19th century.

The new building of the Oral Pedagogical Institute was built from 1937 to 1939. From the 18th century until 1937, on the site of part of the building and part of the park in front of the pedagogical institute, there was a Kazan church, which was demolished and part of the brick from this church was used to build the first floor of the pedagogical institute. Now it is the main building of a modern university. That same year, the university was named after Alexander Pushkin.

During World War II, the Odessa Infantry School was located in the building of the Faculty of Natural Sciences. In the main building and in the adjacent territory, the Leningrad Military School of Communications named after Lensovet. In 1943, after the Battle of Stalingrad, due to the arrival of a large number of wounded, part of the main building was occupied by a hospital.

In honor of the 50th anniversary and merit in the training of teaching staff in 1982, the institute was awarded the Order of the Badge of Honour.

In May 1996, by the Decree of the Government of Kazakhstan, the Pushkin Oral Pedagogical Institute was transformed into the Pushkin West Kazakhstan Humanitarian University.

On 14 February 2000, by the Decree of the Government of Kazakhstan No. 236, the West Kazakhstan State University was established and in 2003, it was named after Makhambet Otemisuly.

== Faculties ==
- Faculty of History, Economics and Law
- Faculty of Culture and Arts
- Faculty of Philology
- Faculty of Education
- Faculty of Physics and Mathematics
- Faculty of Natural Geography
