= Uraz Isayev =

Soviet politician

- Ораз Исаев

Chairman of the Council of People's Commissars of the Kazakh SSR
- In office 5 December 1936 – 31 May 1938
- Preceded by: Himself (as Chairman of the Council of People's Commissars of the Kazakh ASSR)
- Succeeded by: Ibrahim Tajiyev

Chairman of the Council of People's Commissars of the Kazakh ASSR
- In office May 1928 (Note: According to other sources, in April 1929) – 5 December 1936
- Preceded by: Nygmet Nurmakov
- Succeeded by: Himself (as Chairman of the Council of People's Commissars of the Kazakh SSR)

Personal details
- Born: Uraz Januzaquly Isayev; 28 May 1899 Lbischenska, Ural Oblast, Russian Empire
- Died: 29 August 1938 (aged 39) Moscow, Soviet Union
- Resting place: Kommunarka shooting ground
- Party: CPSU (1920–1938)
- Spouse: Sara Yesova
- Children: Nurlan, Beket

Uraz Janūzaqūly Isayev (Kazakh: Ораз Жанұзақұлы Исаев, 28 May 1899 – 29 August 1938) was a Soviet politician, who served as de-facto Prime Minister of the Kazakh Autonomous Soviet Socialist Republic (May 1929 – December 1936) and the Kazakh Soviet Socialist Republic (December 1936 – September 1937).

A candidate-member of the Central Committee elected by the 17th Congress of the All-Union Communist Party (Bolsheviks) from 1934 to 12 October 1937, and a full member until 31 May 1938, he was arrested and executed during the Great Purge. He was rehabilitated on 19 May 1956.

== Biography ==
=== Early years ===
Born into a Kazakh family in 1899, Isayev graduated from a two-year elementary Russian-Kazakh school. Until 1918, he worked as a clerk at the Shalkar zemstvo Council (Ural Region).

He was a member of the Ural district-city workers' and peasants' militia, then became deputy chairman of the executive committee of the Shalkar Volost Council in 1919, then Commissioner of the District Trade Union Bureau in 1920. He joined the Russian Communist Party (Bolsheviks) in 1920.

=== Party career ===
He became a Commissioner of the Dzhambeyta Political Bureau of the Cheka in 1921 and held a series of Party positions during the early 1920s. In 1924-1925 he served as Secretary of the Central Executive Committee of the Kazakh Autonomous Soviet Socialist Republic. From 1929 to 1938 he was Chairman of the Council of People's Commissars of the Kazakh Autonomous Soviet Socialist Republic and the Kazakh SSR.

In August 1932, he addressed a letter to Stalin, objecting to the disastrous collectivization policy under the leadership of Filipp Goloshchyokin, that had brought about the Kazakh famine of 1930–1933, causing the death of more than a third of the Kazakh people. This appeal, along with a similar letter from the Deputy Chairman of the Council of People’s Commissars of the RSFSR Turar Ryskulov led to changes in policy towards the Kazakh people. On September 17, 1932, Stalin signed the resolution of the Central Committee of the All-Union Communist Party of Bolsheviks "On the development of livestock farming in Kazakhstan".

He was a candidate member of the Central Committee of the All-Union Communist Party of Bolsheviks from 1930 to 1937 and a delegate to the XVII Congress of the All-Union Communist Party (Bolsheviks) in 1934 representing the Communist Party of Kazakhstan. He was a candidate member of the Presidium of the Central Executive Committee of the USSR (1929–1935), then a member of the Presidium of the Central Executive Committee of the USSR (1935–1938).

At the end of the decade he joined a special troika created by order of the NKVD of the USSR dated July 30, 1937 and was an active participant in Stalin's repressions.

=== Purge, execution and rehabilitation ===
In May 1938, he was summoned to Moscow, and on May 31, 1938, he was arrested by the NKVD. He was included in Stalin’s execution list dated August 20, 1938; Stalin and Molotov approved his execution. He was sentenced by the Military Collegium of the Supreme Court of the USSR to death on August 29, 1938, on charges of "participation in a counter-revolutionary terrorist organization" and shot on the same day. He was buried in the NKVD facility "Kommunarka".

On May 19, 1956, he was posthumously rehabilitated by the USSR All-Union Military Forces.

== Legacy ==
Isayev was among the first Kazakhs to be awarded the Order of Lenin. Under him, the economy, culture, and art in the Kazakh Soviet Socialist Republic developed. He laid the foundation for the industrial development of Kazakhstan; under his leadership, the Embaneft enterprise, the Karaganda coal basin, and the Balkhash, Karpaksai, Zhezkazgan, Leninogorsk, and Zyryanovsky copper smelters were built. Isayev also presided over a campaign to eliminate illiteracy and open primary and secondary schools. Under his direct leadership, the capital of the young republic was moved from Kyzylorda to Almaty.

== Sources ==
- "Эпоха, представленная в лицах" | Блог библиотеки им. Гоголя
- Архив Александра Н. Яковлева - Альманах "Россия. ХХ век" - Биографический словарь
- Travelsouls - Блог о жизни в путешествии
- ТАКОГО СОВНАРКОМА У НАС БОЛЬШЕ НЕ БУДЕТ
- Бейбут КОЙШИБАЕВ: «Мерило интеллигентности – твой поступок» (1-бөлім) | Abai.kz ақпараттық порталы. Абай. Алашорда. Кітапхана. Жаңалықтар. Мақалалар. Саясат. Мәдениет

Preceded by Nygmet Nurmakov	Chairman of the Council of People's Commissars for the Kazakh Autonomous Soviet Socialist Republic; 1928–1936	Succeeded by himself for the Kazakh Soviet Socialist Republic
Preceded by himself for the Kazakh Autonomous Soviet Socialist Republic	Chairman of the Council of People's Commissars for the Kazakh Soviet Socialist Republic; 1936–1937	Succeeded by Ibragim Tazhiyev
