= Oleg Soskovets =

Russian politician (born 1949)

- Олег Сосковец
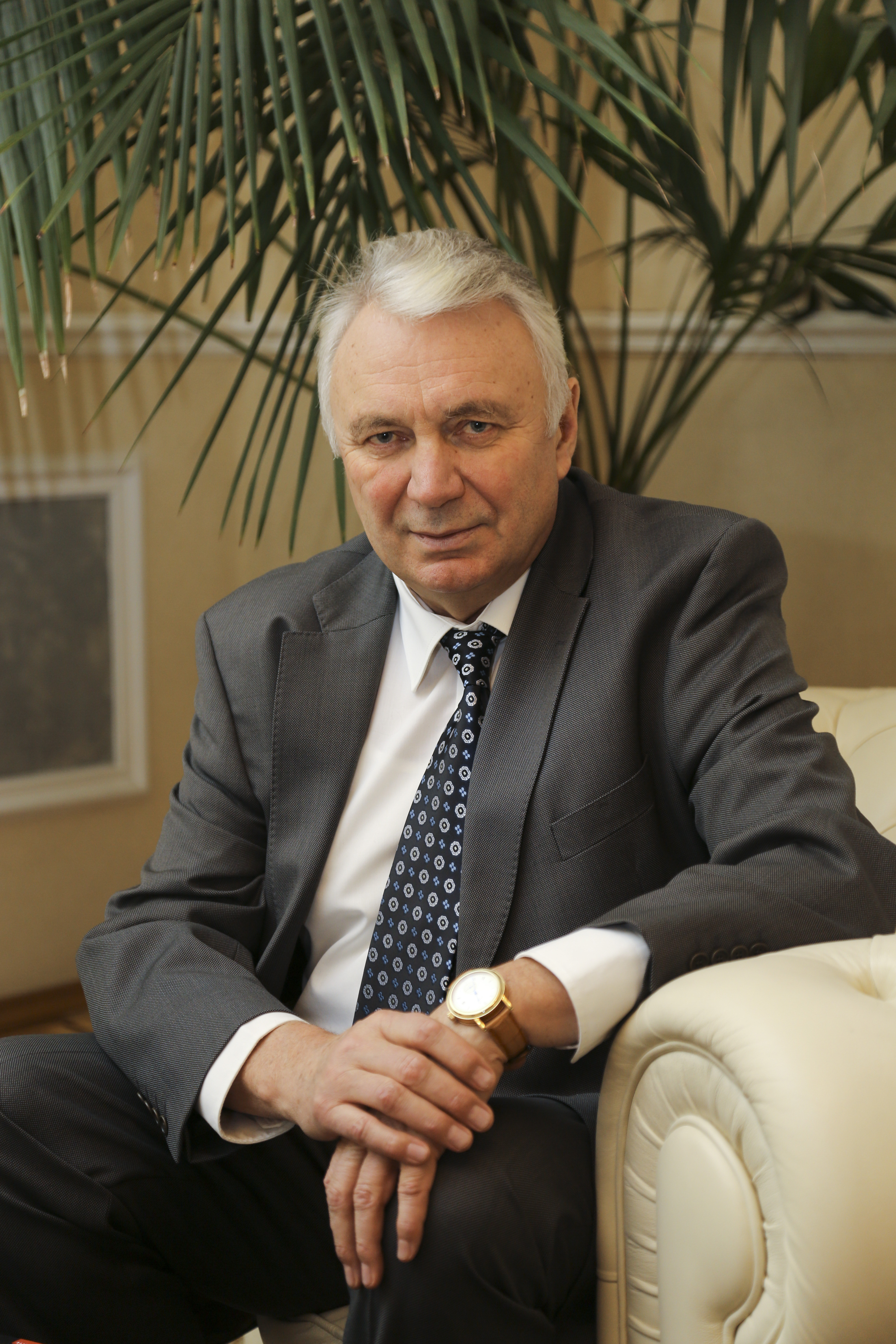
- Soskovets in 2012

First Deputy Prime Minister of Russia
- In office 30 April 1993 – 20 June 1996
- Premier: Viktor Chernomyrdin

First Deputy Prime Minister of Kazakhstan
- In office 6 February 1992 – 5 November 1992 Serving with Daulet Sembaev
- Premier: Sergey Tereshchenko

Minister of Metallurgy of the USSR
- In office 10 April 1991 – 26 November 1991
- Premier: Valentin Pavlov; Ivan Silayev
- Preceded by: Serafim Kolpakov
- Succeeded by: Office abolished

Personal details
- Born: 11 May 1949 (age 77) Taldy-Kurgan, Kazakh SSR, Soviet Union
- Awards: Order of the Red Banner of Labour

Oleg Nikolayevich Soskovets (Russian: Олег Николаевич Сосковец; born 11 May 1949) is a Soviet and Russian politician.

== Early life and career ==
He was born in Taldy-Kurgan in the Kazakh SSR. From 1971 to 1973, the Soskovets held the position of Roller at Rolling Shop No. 2. Following that, from 1973 to 1976, he served as the Master and Head of the Department of Rolling at the same shop. From 1976 to 1981, he took on the role of Deputy Head and subsequently became the Head of Rolling Shop No. 2. In the period between 1981 and 1984, he assumed the position of Head of Rolling Shop No. 1. Their responsibilities shifted in 1984 to become the Chief Engineer of the entire plant, a role he held until 1987. During 1987 to 1988, he took on the position of Director of the Plant, followed by their appointment as the General Director of the plant from 1988 to 1991.

From 1989-1991, he was elected People's Deputy of the USSR for Temirtau. On 10 April 1991 he was appointed Minister of Metallurgy, a position he held into November.

== Kazakh government ==
From March 1992 - First Deputy Prime Minister and Minister of Industry of the Republic of Kazakhstan in the government of Sergey Tereshchenko. From September 1992, he was President of the Kazakhstan Union of Industrialists and Entrepreneurs.

== Deputy Prime Minister ==
From 30 April 1993 to 20 June 1996, Soskovets served as the First Deputy Chairman of the Government (Deputy Prime Minister) of the Russian Federation. He was amongst those accompanying Boris Yeltsin during the 1994 diplomatic incident at Shannon Airport. He also welcomed Queen Elizabeth II at Moscow's Vnukovo International Airport during her historic state visit to Russia in 1994. He was originally the head of Boris Yeltsin's 1996 reelection campaign, devising its original strategy, but the strategy was ultimately abandoned and Soskovets was dismissed from his role as campaign chairman. Soskovets was regarded as the "official protector" of the Trans-World Group which controlled Russian aluminum industry. Soskovets was dismissed from Yeltsin's administration soon after the Xerox affair.

== Post-government ==
Since 2011, he has been Vice-President of the Russian Academy of Engineering and the president of the Russian Union of Manufacturers.

== Personal life ==
He has a daughter, Natalia, and a son, Alexei. Soskovets is the father-in-law of Dmytro Salamatin who was Minister of Defense of Ukraine in 2012. His brother-in-law Igor Mezhakov was a Deputy Director of the Federal Security Service.

== Awards and honours ==
- Order of Honour (29 April 2019)
- Order of Friendship (26 December 2009)
- Order of the Red Banner of Labour
- Order of Friendship (Kazakhstan)
- Order of the Leopard, 2nd Class (Kazakhstan)
- Jubilee Medal "25 years of Independence of the Republic of Kazakhstan" (2017)
