= James Giffen =

American businessman (1941–2022)

- Born: March 22, 1941; Stockton, California, U.S.
- Died: October 29, 2022 (aged 81); New York City, U.S.
- Education: University of California (BA); University of California, Los Angeles
- Occupation: businessman
- Known for: Kazakhgate
- Spouse: June Hopkins (divorced)
- Children: 2

James Henry Giffen (March 22, 1941 – October 29, 2022) was an American businessman and an authority on American-Soviet trade. He was the founder and chairman of Mercator Corporation. Giffen was the prime suspect accused in the $80 million Kazakhgate bribery scandal, which was at one time the largest U.S. investigations ever into an overseas bribery case; but which went nowhere.

== Background ==
Giffen was born in Stockton, California, on March 22, 1941. He had ties to the USSR dating back to the 1970s. After graduating from college, he worked for a subsidiary of Armco Steel, developing a relationship with Armco boss and future US commerce secretary C. William Verity, Jr. During the Cold War, Giffen was instrumental in setting up the multi-company American Trade Consortium (including large corporations such as RJR Nabisco, Chevron, Eastman Kodak, Johnson & Johnson and Archer Daniels Midland) to negotiate entry into the Soviet market with representatives of Soviet President Mikhail Gorbachev.

== Kazakhgate trial ==
In the Kazakhgate trial, Giffen asserted that he was acting with the approval of the Central Intelligence Agency, which refused to release secret papers relating to these activities. His defense said Giffen had merely been following orders from the Kazakh government, which as a foreign state had the right to define legality according to its own views, and serving the interests of the United States.

Giffen eventually pleaded guilty to a tax misdemeanor and paid $25; the other charges, which could have carried a penalty of several decades in prison, were dropped. The case concluded in November 2010; U.S. District Judge William Pauley, who said he had been able to refer to classified documents that had not been made public in the trial, ordered neither prison time nor a fine for Giffen.

== Personal life and death ==
Giffen died in Manhattan on October 29, 2022, at the age of 81.

== Fictional Portrayal ==
The character Danny Dalton from 2005 film Syriana, played by Tim Blake Nelson, was loosely based on James Giffen.

== Publications ==
=== Books ===
- The Legal and Practical Aspects of Trade with the Soviet Union. New York: Frederick A. Praeger, Inc. (1969). Introduction by U.S. Senator Walter F. Mondale.

=== Articles ===
- "Developing a Market Program for the U.S.S.R." Columbia Journal of World Business, vol. 8, no. 4 (Winter 1973), pp. 61–68. ISSN 0022-5428.
- "US-Soviet Trade: Political Realities and Future Potential," with Michael V. Forrestal. Columbia Journal of World Business, vol. 18, no. 4 (Winter 1983), pp. 29–35. ISSN 0022-5428.
