= Ministry of Agriculture (Kazakhstan) =

Government ministry of Kazakhstan

Ministry of Agriculture of the Republic of Kazakhstan
- Қазақстан Республикасы Ауыл шаруашылығы министрлігі (Kazakh); Министерство сельского хозяйства Республики Казахстан (Russian)
- Emblem of Kazakhstan

Agency overview
- Formed: October 1991
- Jurisdiction: Government of Kazakhstan
- Headquarters: Nur-Sultan, Kazakhstan
- Agency executive: Aidarbek Saparov, Minister

The Ministry of Agriculture of the Republic of Kazakhstan (MA RK, Kazakh: Қазақстан Республикасы Ауыл шаруашылығы министрлігі, romanized: Qazaqstan Respwblïkası Awıl şarwaşılığı mïnïstrligi, ҚР АШМ; Russian: Министерство сельского хозяйства Республики Казахстан, МСХ РК) is a central body within the government of Kazakhstan. Its current minister is Erbol Qaraşukeev.

== Function ==
The Ministry deals with the basic forms of agriculture such as the formation and implementation of the state agrarian and regional policy, strategic plans, state and other programs and projects in the regulated sphere, namely in the field of agriculture, agriculture, fisheries and water management, protection of reproduction and use of flora and fauna, especially protected natural territories and issues of rural development, agriculture, seed production and regulation of the grain market, state support for compulsory insurance in crop production, protection and plant shelter, veterinary medicine, manufacturing in the field of food production. The formation of the foundations for creating competitive agricultural commodity production, ensuring food security and mobilization readiness. Ensuring state control, supervision and management in the regulated sphere, with the exception of the areas of forestry, hunting, fisheries and water management, specially protected natural areas and rural development issues, Informing and consulting support for the agro-industrial complex.

== Structure ==
Committees:

- Committee of Water Resources (transferred to the new ministry in 2019);
- Committee of Forestry and Animal World (transferred to the new ministry in 2019);
- Committee of Land Management;
- Committee of Veterinary Control and Supervision;
- Committee of the State Inspectorate in the Agro-Industrial complex.

Departments:

- Department of International Cooperation;
- Department of Mobilization Preparation;
- Department of Strategic Planning and Analysis;
- Department of Internal Audit;
- Department of Production and Processing of Livestock Products;
- Department of Production and Processing of Crop Products;
- Department of Transboundary Rivers;
- Department of Veterinary, Phytosanitary and Food Safety;
- Department of Investment Policy;
- Department of Legal Service;
- Department of Personnel and Administrative Supervision;
- Department of Financial Support;
- Department of Protection of Public Secrets;
- Department of Public Relations;
- Department of Development of State Services and Digitalization.

== List of ministers ==
Minister	Term of Office		Cabinet
Valentin Dvurechensky	29 December 1990	7 February 1992	Karmanov II
Valentin Dvurechensky	29 December 1990	7 February 1992	Tereshchenko
Baltash Tursumbaev	7 February 1992	18 November 1993	Tereshchenko
Sergey Kulagin	22 November 1993	19 June 1994	Tereshchenko
Janibek Karibjanov	13 June 1994	4 March 1996	Tereshchenko
Janibek Karibjanov	13 June 1994	4 March 1996	Kazhegeldin
Serik Aqymbekov	5 March 1996	20 January 1998	Kazhegeldin
Serik Aqymbekov	5 March 1996	20 January 1998	Balgimbayev
Sergey Kulagin	20 January 1998	16 September 1998	Balgimbayev
Toleuhan Nurkianov	6 October 1998	22 January 1999	Balgimbayev
Janibek Karibjanov	22 January 1999	19 July 1999	Balgimbayev
Sauat Mynbayev	26 July 1999	18 May 2001	Balgimbayev
Sauat Mynbayev	26 July 1999	18 May 2001	Tokayev
Akhmetzhan Yessimov	18 May 2001	15 May 2004	Tokayev
Akhmetzhan Yessimov	18 May 2001	15 May 2004	Tasmagambetov
Akhmetzhan Yessimov	18 May 2001	15 May 2004	Akhmetov
Serik Umbetov	15 May 2004	11 August 2005	Akhmetov
Askar Myrzakhmetov	25 August 2005	19 January 2006	Akhmetov
Akhmetzhan Yessimov	19 January 2006	4 April 2008	Akhmetov
Akhmetzhan Yessimov	19 January 2006	4 April 2008	Massimov I
Aqylbek Kurishbaev	4 April 2008	8 April 2011	Massimov I
Asyljan Mamytbekov	11 April 2011	6 May 2016	Massimov I
Asyljan Mamytbekov	11 April 2011	6 May 2016	Akhmetov
Asyljan Mamytbekov	11 April 2011	6 May 2016	Massimov II
Askar Myrzakhmetov	6 May 2016	15 December 2017	Massimov II
Askar Myrzakhmetov	6 May 2016	15 December 2017	Sagintayev
Umirzak Shukeyev	15 December 2017	25 February 2019	Sagintayev
Saparhan Omarov	25 February 2019	5 January 2022	Mamin
Erbol Qaraşukeev	11 January 2022	4 September 2023	Smaiylov
Aidarbek Saparov	4 September 2023	Incumbent	Smaiylov
