= Saken Seifullin =

Kazakh poet, writer, and activist (1894–1938)

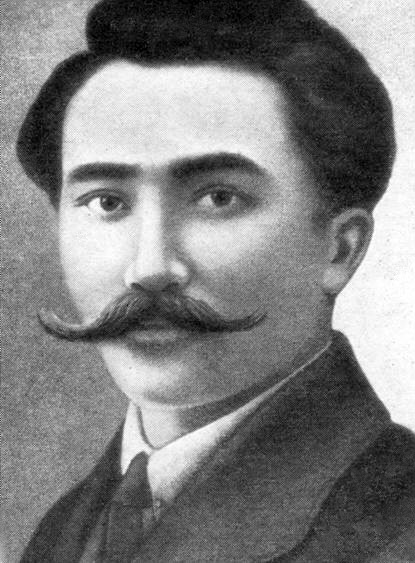
Saken Seifullin portrait

Saken Seifullin (Kazakh: Сәкен (Сәдуақас) Сейфуллин, Säken (Säduaqas) Seifullin; 15 October 1894 – 25 April 1938) was a pioneer of modern Kazakh literature, a poet, a writer, and a national activist. He was the founder and the first head of the Union of Writers of Kazakhstan. His controversial writings promoting Kazakh independence led to his execution in 1938. The Soviet government posthumously rehabilitated him in 1957, during the de-Stalinisation period.

== Biography ==
Seifullin was born in a nomadic settlement in what is today Qarağandy Region.

=== Education ===
From 1905 to 1908, Seifullin studied in a Russian-Kazakh school at the Spassk brass works. He went on to study in Aqmola at the primary parish school and the Aqmola three-class city school. In addition, he taught Russian at a Muslim madrasah. On 21 August 1913, Seifullin entered the Omsk teaching seminary. His first article was published in the November edition of Ay Qap magazine. It was at this time that he began to be spied upon by the Omsk okhrana, the secret police.

In 1914, Seifullin became one of the heads of the first cultural and educational society of Kazakh youth, Bırlık (Unity), in Omsk. His book of poetry, Ötken Künder (Past Days), was published that year.

In 1916, he worked on a property census commission for the 12 volosts of Akmolinsk Uezd. In that year, he wrote the poem Volnenie (Unrest), dedicated to the Central Asian unrest of 1916. From 1 September 1916, he taught at Bugula school, which he co-founded.

On 9 March 1917, he moved to Aqmola, where he wrote a welcoming poem for the February Revolution, Bız asyğys jinaldyq (We quickly gathered to march). In April of that year, Seifullin created a social-political and cultural society named Jas Qazaq (Young Kazakh). In July, he contributed to an issue of the newspaper Tırşılık (Life). In September, Seifullin began teaching three-month pedagogical courses at the new Russian-Kazakh school in Akmolinsk.

Immediately after the Russian Revolution, Seifullin wrote a poem, "А ну-ка, джигиты!", which is said to be the first work of Kazakh Soviet literature. On 27 December 1917, the Soviet regime was established in Akmolinsk. Seifullin was elected a member of the Aqmola Deputy Board and was appointed national commissar of education. In February, he was admitted to the Party. On 1 May 1918, his play, Baqyt Jolyna (On the Way of Happiness), was performed for the first time.

=== Civil War ===
When, on 4 June 1918, the White Guard conducted a revolution, Seifullin was arrested and sent to Petropavlovsk jail. He was put in a 'Death Carriage' of Ataman Boris Annenkov, where he spent 47 days. He broke out of Kolchak Prison and reached his village by July. After two months, he was forced to flee to Taraz.

=== Capture and execution ===
Seifullin was arrested by agents of the NKVD from Moscow on 25 April 1938 and executed in Almaty, Kazakh SSR, deemed a 'threat to society' and a 'nationalist'. However, he was rehabilitated in 1957.
