= Satbayev University =

Technical university in Almaty, Kazakhstan

Coordinates: 43°14′11″N 76°55′47″E

- Сәтбаев университеті (Kazakh)
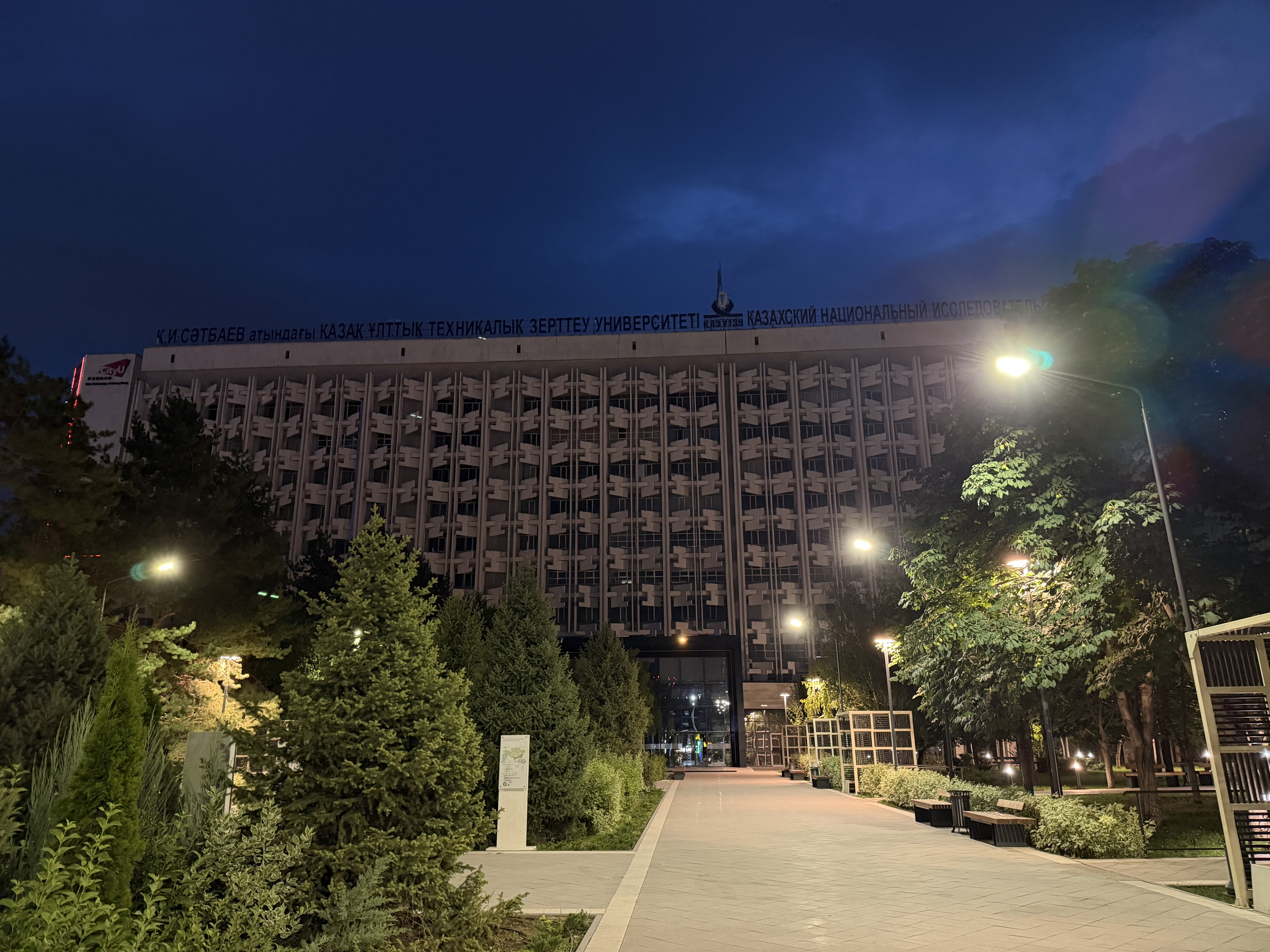
- Type: Technical University
- Established: 1934
- Rector: Iskander Beisembetov
- Location: 22 Satbayev street, (Kazakhstan) Almaty, Kazakhstan
- Campus: Urban
- Website: satbayev.university

University rankings

Global – Overall
- QS World: 331 (2026)

Regional – Overall
- QS Emerging Europe and Central Asia: 64 (2022)

Satbayev University (Kazakh: Сәтбаев университеті, romanized: Sätbaev universitetı) is a technical university located in Almaty, Kazakhstan. The university is the oldest technical university in Kazakhstan, comprising 11 institutions and 27 departments.

== History ==
In the 1930s, to improve the technical and economic state of the national economy, development of higher technical education was prioritized.

On October 20, 1933 by Resolution of the Council of People's Commissars of the USSR "On personnel training for Kazakhstan" was established the Kazakh Mining and Metallurgical Institute (KazMMI) with two faculties: mining and non-ferrous metals in a capital of Kazakhstan, Alma-Ata.

On September 19, 1934 the first academic year at Kazakh Mining and Metallurgical Institute began.

- 1934-1960 - Kazakh Mining and Metallurgical Institute (KazMMI);
- 1960-1994 - Kazakh Polytechnic Institute (KazPTI);
- From 1994 - Kazakh National Technical University (KazNTU).

Kazakh Polytechnic Institute named after V.I. Lenin was renamed as Kazakh National Technical University based on Decree No. 43 issued by the Cabinet of Ministers of the Republic of Kazakhstan on January 7, 1994 and in accordance with Order No. 1 issued by the Ministry of Education on February 2, 1994.

Based on Decree No. 1436 issued by the Government of the Republic of Kazakhstan on September 22, 1999, Kazakh National Technical University was named after Kanysh Satbayev. Based on Decree No. 1879 issued December 8, 1999, Kazakh National Technical University named after Kanysh Satpayev was transformed into republican national budget-supported enterprise.

Based on Decree No. 892 issued by the Government of the Republic of Kazakhstan on June 29, 2001, Kazakh National Technical University named after Kanysh Satpayev was renamed into Satbayev Kazakh National Technical University.

Based on Decree No. 149 issued by the government on February 11, 2003, republican national budget-supported enterprise "Satbayev Kazakh National Technical University" was reorganized into republican enterprise on the basis of economic control rights "Satbayev Kazakh National Technical University" under the Ministry of Education and Science.

== Institutes ==
The university is home to 11 separate institutes:

- The Institute of Digital Engineering and Technologies
- The Parasat National Scientific and Technological Center
- The Phytochemistry Research and Production Center
- The Almaty Institute of Physics and Technology
- The U. M. Ahmedsafin Institute of Hydro-geology and Geo-ecology
- The Institute of geography of the Republic of Kazakhstan
- The K. I. Satpayev Institute of Geological Sciences
- The Institute of Seismology
- The Institute of Metallurgy and Enrichment
- The Altai Geological and Ecological Institute
- The T. Basenov Institute of Architecture and Civil Engineering

== Education ==
At the Kazakh Technical University after K. I. Satpaev the educational activity is delivered by seven Profile Institutes, International Institute of Postgraduate Education "Excellence polytech," Institute for Distance Learning, College.

The university delivers training of:

- 28 bachelors educational programs of the technical sphere and 18 educational programs of nontechnical sphere
- 50 Masters educational programs
- 24 PhD educational programs
- on the base of college 18 bachelors short educational programs
- 5 international educational programs of Cyprus University
- 46 educational programs on the base of the second higher education

== The Scientific Library ==
The Scientific Library of Satbayev University is the university's library. Founded in 1934 as a small library employing two people, the library has since grown to have over 2,000,000 books, receive about 15,000 unique visitors annuals, and received approximately 600,000 visits annually. The Scientific Library is subscribed to around 500 Kazakh and Russian periodicals, and conducts book exchanges with other universities. The library's facilities include reading rooms able to seat 1,650 people and computer rooms able to seat 500. An online library was developed in 2009, which hosts over 14,700 documents, and attracts more than 40,000 unique visitors annually.

== Notable alumni ==
- Rufina Isakova
- Alexandra Elbakyan
