= Olzhas Suleimenov =

Kazakh poet, politician, and anti-nuclear activist (born 1936)

- Олжас Сүлейменов
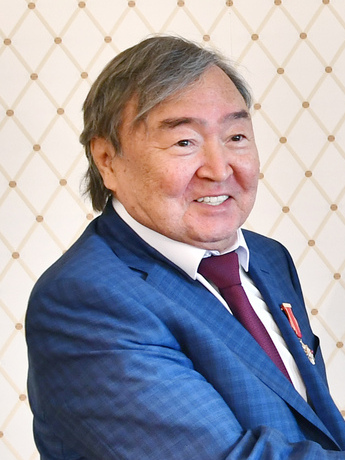
- Suleimenov in 2021

Chairman of the People's Congress
- In office 5 October 1991 – 1995
- Preceded by: Office established
- Succeeded by: Güljan Erğalieva

Personal details
- Born: 18 May 1936 (age 90) Alma-Ata, Kazakh ASSR, Russian SFSR, Soviet Union
- Citizenship: Kazakhstan
- Education: Kazakh State University; Maxim Gorky Literature Institute
- Occupation: Poet; politician; anti-nuclear activist

Olzhas Omaruly Suleimenov (Note: Kazakh: Олжас Омарұлы Сүлейменов, romanized: Oljas Omarūly Süleimenov; Russian: Олжас Омарович Сулейменов, romanized: Olzhas Omarovich Suleymenov) (born 18 May 1936) is a Kazakh Russian-language poet, Turkologist, politician, and former anti-nuclear activist.

== Life ==
Suleimenov was born to a Muslim family as the son of Omar Suleimenov on 18 May 1936 in Alma-Ata. He graduated from Geological Sciences Department of Kazakh State University in 1959. Suleimenov also finished Maxim Gorky Literature Institute in 1961. Between 1962 and 1971, he worked at Kazakhskaya Pravda. Suleimenov was awarded Komsomol Prize for Kazakhstan in 1966. Between 1969 and 1989, he was a member of the Communist Party of the Soviet Union. In 1981, he was a member of the jury at the 12th Moscow International Film Festival. He became First Secretary of the Committee of the Kazakhstan's Writers Union in 1983. He is a Russophone writer.

== Works ==
His most influential work, AZ-and-IA (Russian: АЗ и Я. Книга благонамеренного читателя), was published in 1975. The book is about the possible Turkic origin of the Russian chronicle The Tale of Igor's Campaign. AZ-i-IA drew widespread criticism from the literary elite in Russia. Suleimenov was charged with "national chauvinism" and "glorifying feudal nomadic culture." Kazakhstan Communist Party first secretary Dinmuhammad Konayev intervened on Suleimenov's behalf, discussing the content of the book with Leonid Brezhnev and saving Suleimenov's career.

His other works include:

- Argamaki (1961)
- Zemlia Poklonis' Cheloveku (1961)
- Solnechnye Nochi (1962)
- Dobroe Vremia Voskhoda (1964)
- God Obez'iany (1967)
- Glinianaia Kniga (1969)
- The Turks in Prehistory (on the origin of the ancient Turkic languages and scripts)

== Political activities ==
Suleimenov again became a worldwide name in 1989, when he led the establishment of the international environmental movement Nevada-Semipalatinsk. Nevada-Semipalatinsk campaigned to close nuclear sites in Nevada and in the Semipalatinsk Oblast of Kazakhstan.

After independence, Suleimenov established the People's Congress of Kazakhstan party in 1991 and served as the speaker of Parliament from 1993 until 1994. While at the Parliament, he rose to the position of opposition leader, engaging in several political struggles with President Nursultan Nazarbaev. Many opposition leaders urged him to run as a candidate in the next presidential elections.

In 1995, to preempt his potential candidacy, Nazarbayev brokered a deal, and Suleimenov was appointed as Kazakhstan's ambassador to Rome. Since 2002 he serves as Kazakhstani ambassador at the UNESCO in Paris.

On 4 February 2023, he was elected Chairman of the International Democratic Party People's Congress of Kazakhstan.

== See also ==
- Douglas Mackiernan
- List of nuclear weapons tests
- Soviet atomic bomb project
- Nuclear weapons testing
- Novaya Zemlya
- Andrei Sakharov
