= People's Union of Kazakhstan Unity =

People's Union of Kazakhstan Unity Қазақстан халық бірлігі одағы Qazaqstan halyq bırlıgı odağy Союз народного единства Казахстана
- Leader: Quanysh Sultanov
- Founded: 6 February 1993
- Dissolved: 12 February 1999
- Succeeded by: Otan
- Headquarters: Astana
- Political position: Big tent

People's Union of Kazakhstan Unity (Kazakh: Қазақстан халық бірлігі одағы, romanized: Qazaqstan halyq bırlıgı odağy) was a big tent political party in Kazakhstan founded in 1993 and dissolved in 1999 when it was incorporated into the Fatherland and later the Nur Otan party.

== Notable members ==
- Akezhan Kazhegeldin (born 1952), Prime Minister of Kazakhstan from 1994 to 1997
- Nurlan Balgimbayev (1947–2015), Prime Minister of Kazakhstan from 1997 to 1999

== Election results ==
=== Presidential Elections ===
Election	Party candidate	Votes	%	Result
1999	Engels Gabbasov	55,708	0.77	Lost ✗

=== Mazhilis ===
Election	Seats won	±	Total votes	Share of votes	Position	Party leader
1994	33 / 177	▲33			Minority gov't	Quanysh Sultanov
1995	25 / 67	▼8			Minority gov't	Quanysh Sultanov
