= People's Congress of Kazakhstan =

People's Congress of Kazakhstan Kazakh: Қазақстан халқы конгресі
- President: Kassym-Jomart Tokayev
- Founders: Olzhas Suleimenov Chairman of the party
- Founded: 5 October 1991; 34 years ago (QUK)
- Registered: 31 December 1991; 34 years ago 31 January 2023; 3 years ago (re-registered)
- Dissolved: 25 December 2001; 24 years ago
- Headquarters: Almaty
- Ideology: Liberal democracy Anti-nuclear movement
- Slogan: "The earth and its bowels belong to the people!"

The People's Congress of Kazakhstan (Kazakh: Қазақстан халқы конгресі, romanized: Qazaqstan halqy kongresı) was a political party in Kazakhstan. It was founded on 5 October 1991 and became registered on 31 December 1991. It was founded by Olzhas Suleimenov who led the party from 1991 to 1995.

The QUK was founded and grew out of the anti-nuclear Nevada-Semipalatinsk movement. Due to the popularity of this movement, the party found many supporters. The party had an extensive regional network, in which 18 regions of Kazakhstan were represented, except for West Kazakhstan.

In its economic policy, the QUK committed to creating legal conditions for the development of a modern socially oriented market economy, the main link of which is commodity production. The PARTY emphasized the need for a phased, gradual privatization of enterprises owned by the state as well as collective and public property.

From the QUK party, 23 candidates were nominated for elections to the Mazhilis and 10 people from the Nevada-Semipalatinsk movement. The party found its most success in the 1994 Kazakh legislative election, winning 9 seats. However, after a snap legislative election in 1995, the party lost 8 seats leaving it with just only one. In the 1999 Kazakh legislative election, the QUK lost its only seat and never managed to regain any seats.

On 25 December 2001, the QUK, along with the Democratic Party of Azamat, and the People's Republican Party was merged into a single political party which was the United Democratic Party. The party, however, never became registered nor had a big popularity.

On January 31, 2023, the People's Congress of Kazakhstan Party passed its initial registration with the Ministry of Justice.
