= Prime Minister of Kazakhstan =

Head of government

Prime Minister of the Republic of Kazakhstan
- Қазақстан Республикасының премьер-министрі (Kazakh); Премьер-министр Республики Казахстан (Russian)
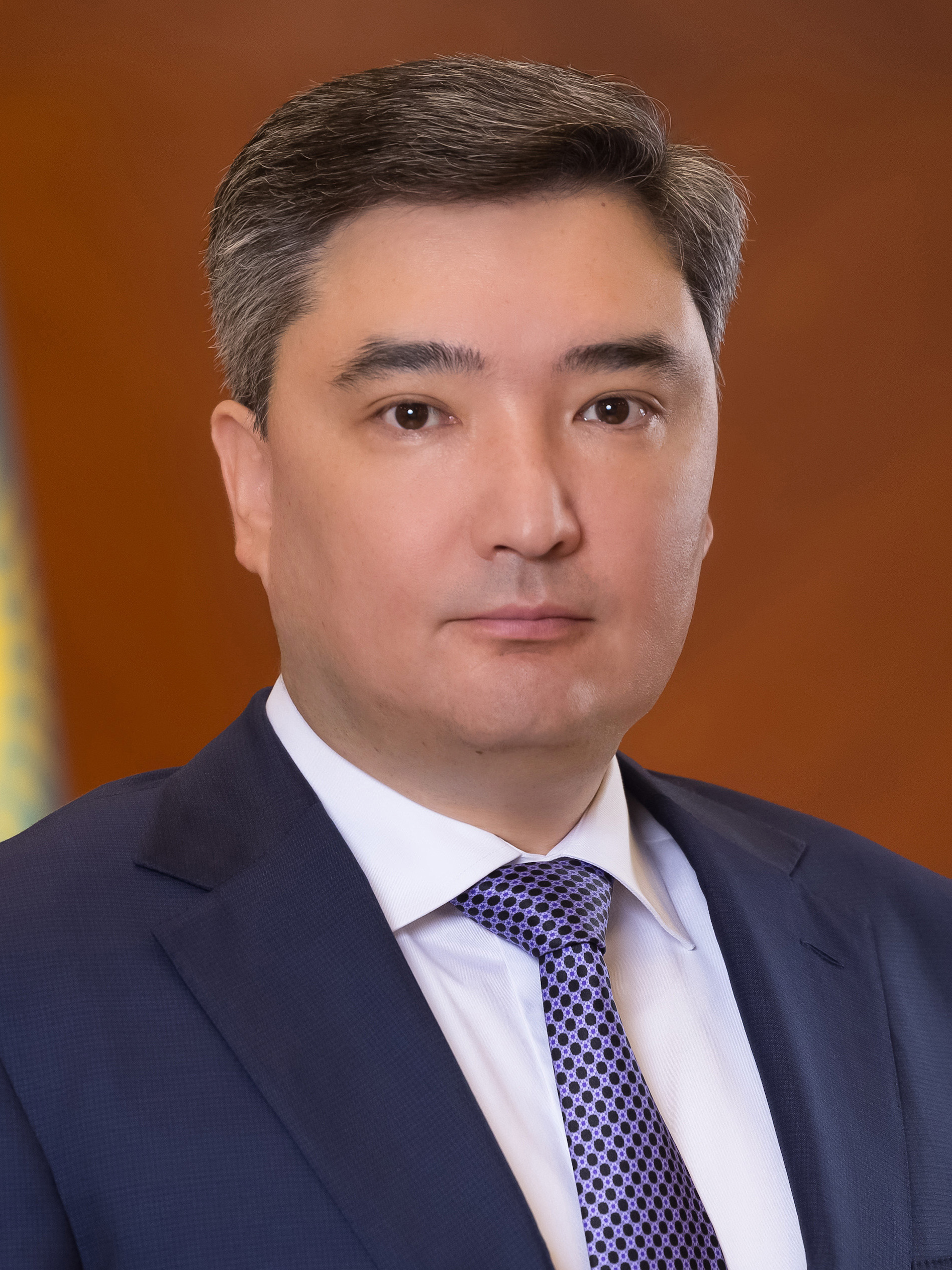
- Incumbent; Oljas Bektenov since 6 February 2024
- Prime Minister's Office
- Style: Mr Prime Minister; (informally); His Excellency; (diplomatic)
- Type: Head of government
- Member of: Security Council
- Residence: Astana, Kazakhstan
- Appointer: President of Kazakhstan in agree with Kurultai
- Term length: Five years, renewable
- Precursor: Prime Minister of the Kazakh Soviet Socialist Republic
- Formation: 16 December 1991; 34 years ago
- First holder: Sergey Tereshchenko
- Deputy: First Deputy Prime Minister

The prime minister of Kazakhstan (Note: Kazakh: Қазақстан Республикасының Премьер-Министрі, romanized: Qazaqstan Respublikasynyñ Premier-Ministrı, IPA: [qɑzɑqˈstɑn rʲɪsˌpublʲɪkəsəˈnəŋ prʲɪmˈjer mʲɪˈnʲistrɘ]; Russian: Премьер-Министр Республики Казахстан, romanized: Premier-Ministr Respubliki Kazahstan, IPA: [prʲɪmˈjer mʲɪˈnʲistr rʲɪˈspublʲɪkʲɪ kəzɐxˈstan]) is the head of government of Kazakhstan and the holder of its fourth highest office, after the president of Kazakhstan and the vice president of Kazakhstan, and the chairman of the Kurultai. The prime minister heads the cabinet and advises the president. The incumbent prime minister is Oljas Bektenov, who replaced acting Prime Minister Roman Sklyar on 6 February 2024 after the previous government's resignation.

== List ==
Since the country's independence, it has had 12 prime ministers, none of whom were women. The longest-serving Prime minister was Karim Massimov, whose two non-consecutive terms combined to be more than eight years long. Massimov, who is of Uyghur and Tajik descent, is the only non-Kazakh prime minister since Sergey Tereshchenko.

People's Union of Kazakhstan Unity / Nur Otan Independent

No.	Portrait	Prime Minister	Took office	Left office	Time in office	Party	Election	President	Cabinet	Ref.
1	Sergey Tereshchenko	Sergey Tereshchenko (1951–2023)	16 December 1991	12 October 1994	2 years, 300 days	Independent	_ (Note: Appointed to the newly created position following the secession of the Kazakh SSR from the Soviet Union.)	Nursultan Nazarbayev (1990 – 2019)	Tereshchenko	.
2	Akezhan Kazhegeldin	Akezhan Kazhegeldin (born 1952)	12 October 1994	10 October 1997	2 years, 363 days	People's Union	1994; 1995	Nursultan Nazarbayev (1990 – 2019)	Kazhegeldin	.
3	Nurlan Balgimbayev	Nurlan Balgimbayev (1947–2015)	10 October 1997	1 October 1999	1 year, 356 days	People's Union	_	Nursultan Nazarbayev (1990 – 2019)	Balgimbayev	.
4	Kassym-Jomart Tokayev	Kassym-Jomart Tokayev (born 1953)	1 October 1999	28 January 2002	2 years, 119 days	Nur Otan	1999	Nursultan Nazarbayev (1990 – 2019)	Tokayev	.
5	Imangali Tasmagambetov	Imangali Tasmagambetov (born 1956)	28 January 2002	11 June 2003	1 year, 136 days	Nur Otan	_	Nursultan Nazarbayev (1990 – 2019)	Tasmagambetov	.
6	Daniyal Akhmetov	Daniyal Akhmetov (born 1954)	11 June 2003	10 January 2007	3 years, 211 days	Nur Otan	2004	Nursultan Nazarbayev (1990 – 2019)	Daniyal Akhmetov	.
7	Karim Massimov	Karim Massimov (born 1965)	10 January 2007	24 September 2012	5 years, 258 days	Nur Otan	2007; 2012	Nursultan Nazarbayev (1990 – 2019)	Massimov I	.
8	Serik Akhmetov	Serik Akhmetov (born 1958)	24 September 2012	2 April 2014	1 year, 190 days	Nur Otan	_	Nursultan Nazarbayev (1990 – 2019)	Serik Akhmetov	.
(7)	Karim Massimov	Karim Massimov (born 1965)	2 April 2014	8 September 2016	2 years, 159 days	Nur Otan	2016	Nursultan Nazarbayev (1990 – 2019)	Massimov II	.
9	Bakhytzhan Sagintayev	Bakhytzhan Sagintayev (born 1963)	8 September 2016	21 February 2019	2 years, 166 days	Nur Otan	_	Nursultan Nazarbayev (1990 – 2019)	Sagintayev	.
10	Askar Mamin	Askar Mamin (born 1965)	21 February 2019	5 January 2022	2 years, 318 days	Nur Otan	2021	Kassym-Jomart Tokayev (since 2019)	Mamin	.
11	Alihan Smaiylov	Alihan Smaiylov (born 1972)	5 January 2022	5 February 2024	2 years, 31 days	Amanat	2023	Kassym-Jomart Tokayev (since 2019)	Smaiylov	.
—	Roman Sklyar	Roman Sklyar (born 1971); Acting	5 February 2024	6 February 2024	1 day	Amanat	_	Kassym-Jomart Tokayev (since 2019)	–	.
12	Oljas Bektenov	Oljas Bektenov (born 1980)	6 February 2024	Incumbent	2 years, 271 days	Independent	2026	Kassym-Jomart Tokayev (since 2019)	Bektenov I Bektenov II	.

== See also ==
- List of heads of government of Kazakhstan
- List of leaders of Kazakhstan
- President of Kazakhstan
- Vice President of Kazakhstan
