= Nurymbet Saqtağanov =

Kazakh politician (born 1970)

Nūrymbet Saqtağanov
- Нұрымбет Сақтағанов
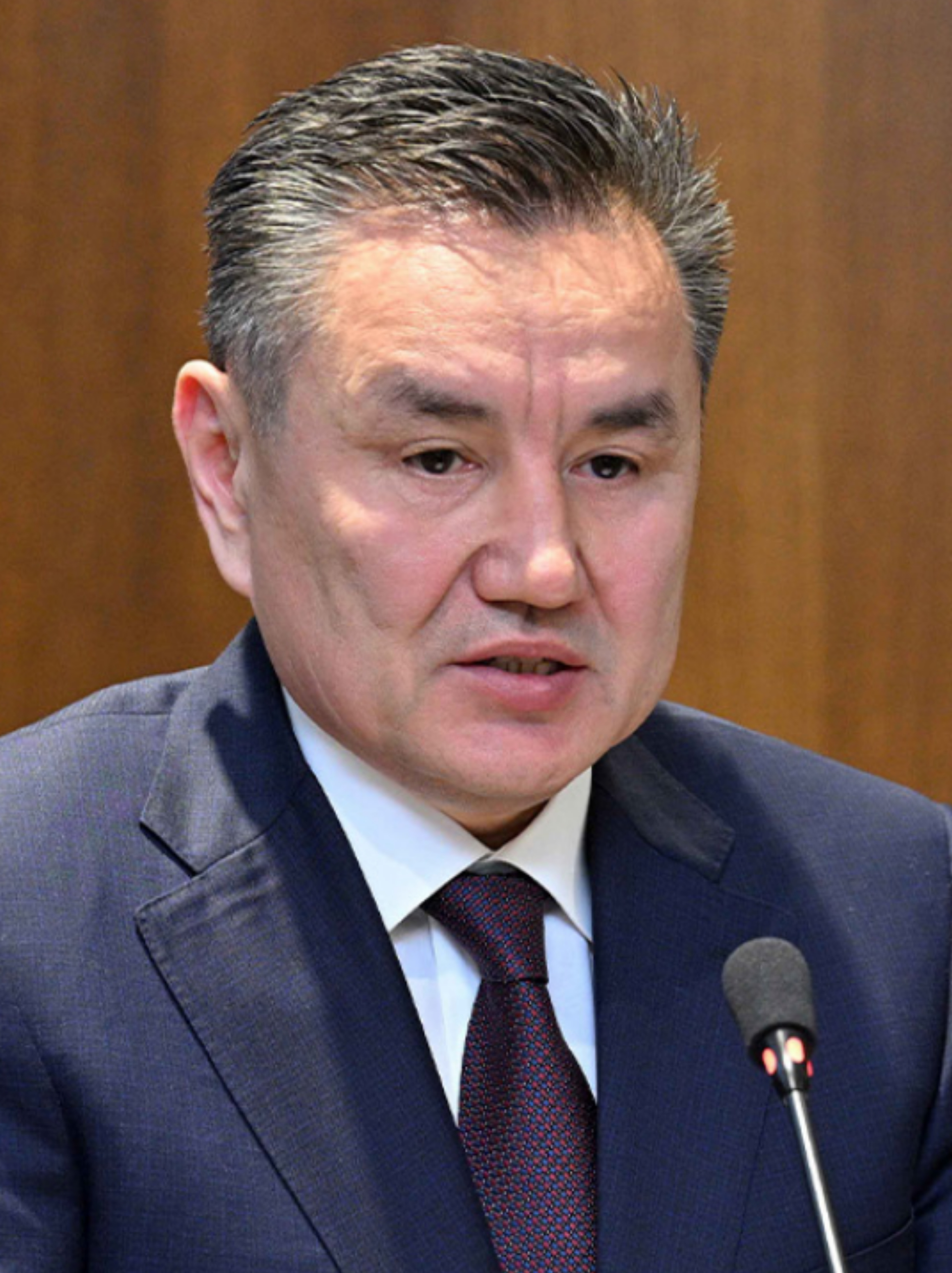
- Saqtağanov in 2025

Äkim of East Kazakhstan Region
- Incumbent
- Assumed office 17 February 2025
- President: Kassym-Jomart Tokayev
- Preceded by: Ermek Köşerbaev

Äkim of Semey
- In office 25 January 2021 – 27 June 2021
- President: Kassym-Jomart Tokayev
- Preceded by: Ermak Salimov
- Succeeded by: Baqytjan Bayakhmetov

Personal details
- Born: 6 August 1970 (age 56) Dzhuvan-Tyube, Sozak, Chimkent Region Kazakh SSR, Soviet Union
- Spouse: Aigul Seitenova
- Children: 7
- Education: Kyzylorda Pedagogical Institute; Moscow State University of Economics, Statistics, and Informatics; East Kazakhstan State University

Military service
- Allegiance: Kazakhstan
- Branch/service: Armed Forces of Kazakhstan
- Years of service: 1993–1994

Nūrymbet Amanūly Saqtağanov (Note: Often transliterated as Nurymbet Amanovich Saktaganov through a Russified Romanization of Нурымбет Аманович Сактаганов.) (Kazakh: Нұрымбет Аманұлы Сақтағанов; born 6 August 1970) is a Kazakh lawyer and manager serving as the akim of East Kazakhstan Region since 2025. He previously served as the akim of Semey from January to June 2021.

== Early life and education ==
Nurymbet Saqtaganov was born on August 6, 1970, in Dzhuvan-Tyube (now Juantobe), a village in Sozak District, Chimkent Region, Kazakh Soviet Socialist Republic, Soviet Union (now Turkistan Region, Kazakhstan).

In 1992, he graduated from the Kyzylorda Pedagogical Institute (now Kyzylorda University) with a degree in schoolteacher.

He studied at the Moscow State University of Economics, Statistics, and Informatics and received a lawyer degree in 2003. He later earned a degree in economics from the East Kazakhstan State University in 2017.

== Early career ==
In 1992, after graduating from the Kyzylorda Pedagogical Institute, he began teaching Kazakh language and literature at Secondary School No. 172 in Syrdarya District, Kyzylorda Region. In 1993 he left teaching to perform military service in the Armed Forces of Kazakhstan. Returning on 20 August 1994, he resumed classroom work two days later at Secondary School No. 9 in Kyzylorda city.

In March 1995 he joined the Kyzylorda Regional Customs Department as an inspector in the Customs Protection and Regime Division. In February 1996 he was promoted to senior inspector in the anti-smuggling and customs violations unit. Two years later, in February 1998, he became chief inspector of the export–import control unit. After a further two years he was appointed head of the passenger department and subsequently served as chief inspector of passenger services. In August 2000 he was named deputy head of the Customs Protection and Regime Department for Kyzylorda Region. From 2001 to 2006 he held positions within the Customs Committee, including chief inspector, assistant to the chairman, and head of a department.

In February 2006, he moved to Astana to serve as a senior expert in the Government Representative Office to the Parliament. After one year he transferred to the Ministry of Economy and Budget Planning (now Ministry of National Economy), joining the Department of Investment Policy and Planning. There he headed the External Investment Planning Unit within the Budget Investment Planning Directorate for three months, and in May 2007, he was appointed adviser to the minister.

After four months as adviser, in September 2007, he joined the Ministry of Labour and Social Protection of the Population as deputy chair of the Migration Committee. When the committee was abolished in September 2010, he was appointed state inspector in the Department of State Control and Organizational‑Territorial Work at the Presidential Administration.

== Political career ==
On October 1, 2012, he moved to East Kazakhstan Region as deputy akim, serving under Berdibek Saparbayev and later Daniyal Akhmetov. He was promoted to first deputy on July 31, 2015.

On June 10, 2018, following agreement with deputies of the Ulan District Mäslihat and by regional akim Daniyal Akhmetov's decree, he was appointed akim of Ulan District.

On January 25, 2021, the Semey city Mäslihat unanimously supported his candidacy as city akim upon nomination by regional akim Daniyal Akhmetov, and he assumed the post. He was dismissed on June 27, 2021, having stepped down for health reasons.

On February 15, 2022, he was appointed akim of Zharma District (now in Abai Region), but his tenure was brief; he was relieved of the post on June 24, 2022.

The same day, he returned to Kyzylorda Region as deputy akim, serving under Gulshara Abdykalikova and subsequently Nurlybek Nalibaev.

He was released from that post on September 7, 2023, and the following day returned to East Kazakhstan Region to resume the senior deputy role he had previously held from 2015 to 2018, this time under Ermek Köşerbaev. When Köşerbaev became deputy prime minister on February 14, 2025, the regional post became vacant. On February 17, president Tokayev proposed him and Ulan District akim Arman Bekbosynov for the post. The regional Mäslihat elected him with 107 of 148 votes to Bekbosynov's 41 and by president Tokayev's decree No. 790, he was appointed to the post.

== Personal life ==
Saqtaganov is married to Aigul Seitenova. They have seven children Aigerim (born 1998), Bahyt (born 1999), Shugyla (born 2003), Ulbosyn (born 2005), Ilyas (born 2007), Janserik (born 2014) and Aqnur (2016). Also he speaks Russian and English, in addition to his native Kazakh.
