= COVID-19 pandemic in Kazakhstan =

Ongoing COVID-19 viral pandemic in Kazakhstan

- Disease: COVID-19
- Pathogen: SARS-CoV-2
- Location: Kazakhstan
- First outbreak: Wuhan, Hubei, China
- Index case: Almaty
- Arrival date: 13 March 2020 (6 years, 8 months, 1 week and 1 day)
- Confirmed cases: 1,231,856
- Recovered: 1,067,201
- Deaths: 13,134

Government website
- www.coronavirus2020.kz/kz

The COVID-19 pandemic in Kazakhstan was a part of the worldwide pandemic of coronavirus disease 2019 (COVID-19) caused by severe acute respiratory syndrome coronavirus 2 (SARS-CoV-2). The virus was confirmed to have reached Kazakhstan on 13 March 2020 after two Kazakh citizens in Almaty returned from Germany. That same day, two more cases were confirmed, with one female arriving from Italy in Astana and the other from Germany in Almaty as well. Following the outbreak, on 15 March 2020, President Kassym-Jomart Tokayev declared a state of emergency that was initially set to last until 15 April 2020. However, measures were prolonged in order to curb the transmission of the virus, leading to many notable holidays such as Nowruz and the Victory Day being cancelled. On 19 March 2020, a strict quarantine was placed on the cities of Astana and Almaty, where most of the cases had been reported. On 30 March 2020, Atyrau and five cities in Karaganda Region went under a lockdown.

While the state of emergency expired in May 2020, the cities of Almaty and Astana and the regions of Atyrau and Mangystau remained under quarantine measures. During that period, the rate of infections grew again. Nationwide restrictions were reintroduced on 20 June 2020, followed by a strict lockdown from 5 July 2020 that was extended to 2 August before measures were eased on 17 August 2020.

As of 8 January 2023, a total of 33,563,811 vaccine doses have been administered in Kazakhstan.

== Background ==
On 12 January 2020, the World Health Organization (WHO) confirmed that a novel coronavirus was the cause of a respiratory illness in a cluster of people in Wuhan, Hubei, China, which was reported to the WHO on 31 December 2019.

The case fatality ratio for COVID-19 has been much lower than SARS of 2003, but the transmission has been significantly greater, with a significant total death toll.

== Timeline ==
=== March–May 2020 ===
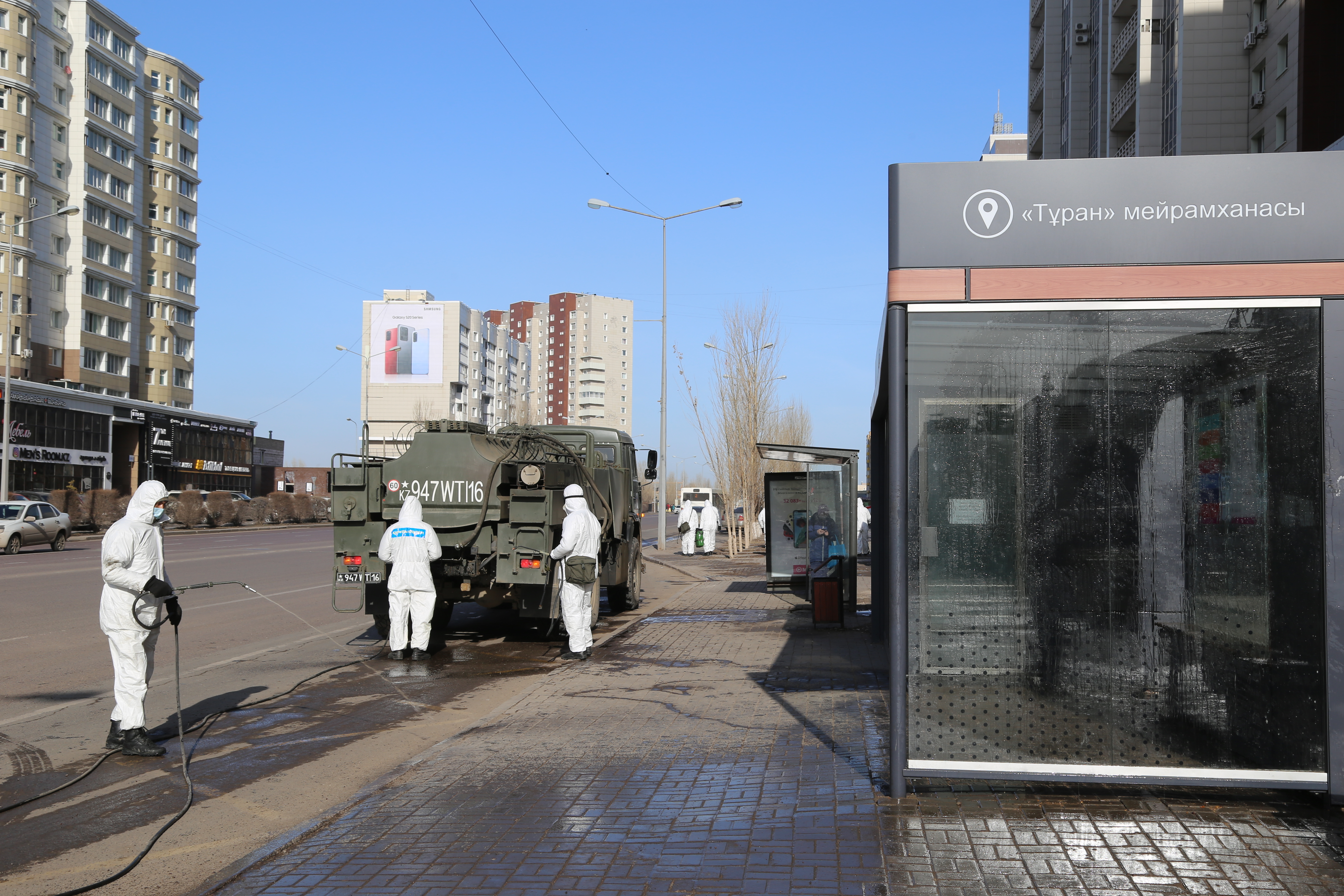
Military personnel of the Kazakh Armed Forces disinfecting the streets of Astana, 26 March 2020

On 13 March 2020, two Kazakh citizens in Almaty who had recently returned from Germany were confirmed to be infected with COVID-19. Just two days later on 15 March, President Kassym-Jomart Tokayev introduced a state of emergency throughout Kazakhstan from 16 March 2020 to 15 April 2020. As a result, the protection of public order and especially important state and strategic facilities were strengthened, operations of shopping centers, cinemas and exhibitions were suspended, as well as mass gatherings, including family, memorial and sports were prohibited.

By 16 March 2020, the number of cases increased by seven, making the total at the time nine, two in Almaty and seven in Astana.

Strict measures were imposed on 19 March 2020 in the two major cities of Almaty and Astana after cases increased overnight to 33, having 15 and 18 cases respectively. During that period, the two cities were divided into sectional zones and creating roadblocks to control accessibility, limiting the movement by residents, regulating the treatment operations for medical institutions in which the infected patients or who were suspected of coming into contact with virus. All stores and shopping malls were closed down with the exception of grocery stores and pharmacies.

On 17 April 2020, just days after the Tokayev's enacted state of emergency was initially set to expire, Chief Sanitary Doctor Aijan Esmağambetova at a briefing announced that the regime had been extended to 30 April, while not ruling out another possible extension, the quarantine measures would gradually be reduced starting with less than 5% of the increase of COVID-19 cases. Esmağambetova also asserted the possibility in completely ending the measures only if there would be no cases amongst people that were in contact with the infected persons or locally reported cases.

On 27 April 2020, President Kassym-Jomart Tokayev announced that the state of emergency would be extended again to 11 May 2020 in which according to Tokayev, the decision was dictated by "current complex reality" and taking the account of epidemiological situation within the country and advice from various health experts and the state commission. Tokayev did not rule out extending the state of emergency from 11 May unless a new wave of infections would occur. He also announced that domestic flights between Almaty and Astana would begin operating again on 1 May 2020 and from there, urged the Kazakhstani public "to carefully consider all precautionary measures, to develop regulations for the interaction of aviation and sanitary-epidemiological services." The decree was signed by Tokayev on 29 April 2020.

In spite of the state of emergency ending on 11 May 2020, quarantine restrictions remained place in Astana, Almaty, Mangystau Region and Atyrau Region with Tokayev embarking it as a "very important for the safety of the population", outlining the "long-term strategic path of development". Chief Sanitary Doctor Aijan Esmağambetova signed a resolution "On further strengthening measures to prevent coronavirus infection among the population of the Republic of Kazakhstan".

=== June–August 2020 ===
Since the state of emergency being lifted, President Tokayev called on the government and local officials to solve the issues in regards quarantine measures that remained in place, stressing that the Kazakhstani public had failed in continuing following guidelines as restrictions weren't observed properly. Healthcare Minister Eljan Birtanov on 4 June 2020 announced that a second wave of infections had begun in Kazakhstan and warning prior, that placing new restrictions would be a blow to the Kazakh economy expressing his personal opposition to the proposal, noting that the introduction of a strict quarantine is "not a solution."

On 18 June 2020, it was reported that a nationwide restriction in Kazakhstan would be reintroduced from 20 June 2020 following a sharp increase in number of COVID-19 cases as restriction guidelines throughout the regions were lifted off and several government officials including healthcare minister Eljan Birtanov and former president Nursultan Nazarbayev testing positive for the virus, with Tokayev earlier asserting that regional quarantine measures remain in difficult position due to "mass noncompliance by citizens" although confidently assuring that they are "under the control of the government." This led to a cancellation of demonstration for animal rights which were due to be held in Almaty on 20 June and public transport in Astana being shut down for a weekend to carry out disinfection work.

In Astana, confirmed cases of COVID-19 increased dramatically, as did pneumonia cases in general (possibly an indication that many patients are not being tested for COVID-19. An apparent spike in cases on 1 July 2020 was caused by the government changing how it reported cases. Starting on that day, asymptomatic cases were included in the total.

During a cabinet meeting on 29 June 2020, Tokayev announced the possibility in returning a lockdown similarly that was introduced at the start of the pandemic in March in order to "stabilize the current epidemiological situation" by instructing the state commission to form a proposal in carrying out the policy while ensuring centralised control over the distribution of critical resources. On 2 July 2020, the Kazakh government approved a 14-day tighter restriction period starting 5 July 2020 which imposed a ban on mass gatherings and restrictions on movement within the public spaces with Prime Minister Askar Mamin hinting that the quarantine measures could be extended or tightened "depending on the further development of the epidemiological situation in the country."

On 13 July 2020, Tokayev announced that a lockdown would be extended until the end of the month, adding that a "quarantine is necessary to protect the health of citizens, provided that they comply with strict self-defense measures." A cabinet meeting between officials were held the following day on 14 July from which the restrictions would be in place until 2 August 2020 with Askar Mamin urging all Kazakhstanis to strictly adhere to quarantine measures. On 27 July, Healthcare Minister Alexey Tsoi announced that the pandemic situation had stabilised, pointing out that the number of COVID-19 patients in occupancy had decreased from 90% to 47%, suggesting that the easing of restrictions was plausible. However just days later on 29 July, Tokayev instructed the government to extend the lockdown for another two weeks with a subsequent phased mitigation.

On 13 August 2020, the Kazakh government approved plan in relaxing restrictions starting 17 August 2020, while face masks and social distancing would remain intact with employers being advised to maintain remote workplace. During that period, daily rate of infections decreased from 4 to 0.5% and number of recovered patients reached 76%.

=== October 2020 ===
At a state briefing, Healthcare Ministry representative Bağdat Qojahmetov stated that a strict quarantine would be imposed if the daily rate of infections reaches 30,000, asserting that Kazakhstan's healthcare system is ready to receive up to 70,000 patients with infected with the COVID-19.

Number of restrictions were introduced on 5 October towards international flights by suspending its resumption and limiting passenger travels to Turkey.

On 7 October, Healthcare Minister Alexey Tsoi forecasted possible three scenarios in regard to curbing the pandemic which were: introducing a lockdown in mid-December if only 60% of populace comply with the mask mandate, introducing a lockdown in January if social distancing and 70% mask mandate compliance is ensured, or completely avoiding lockdown if a 100% mask mandate compliance is ensured, outlining that the forecasts emphasise the "effectiveness of preventive measures" as all regions were in the 'green zone'.

At the Central Communications Service on 14 October, Tsoi suggested that another state of emergency could be introduced if the pandemic situation worsens in the country, not ruling out strict measures. From there, he called on all Kazakh citizens to wear masks, practice social distancing, and avoiding mass gatherings in order to prevent state of emergency being enacted.

Since early October, quarantine measures were strengthened in several regions of Kazakhstan. In the cities of Almaty and Astana, monitoring groups were instructed to carry out inspections for potential restriction violations in enterprises and in.

=== November 2020 ===
After an increase of COVID-19 cases by 3.7 times in November to which according to Healthcare Minister Alexey Tsoi, were occurring in the regions of East Kazakhstan, North Kazakhstan, Pavlodar, Kostanay and Akmola as they made up 70% of all positive cases within Kazakhstan and were classified in the 'red zone'. Tsoi ruled that restrictions could be strengthened from December–January, outlining that the outcome depends on how situation would be managed now.

=== December 2020 ===
On 20 December 2020, as daily increase of cases drew 0.4% and reproductive rate reached 0.9%, it was announced that nationwide restrictions would be strengthened starting 25 December until 5 January 2021. Prime Minister Askar Mamin at a conference call of the Interdepartmental Commission (IMC) instructed local officials to take necessary restrictive measures in stopping the transmission of the virus and attention to the need of high-quality sanitization in public spaces and educational institutions as well as preparation for sites to be used as COVID-19 vaccination clinics. As strict guidelines reached the 5 January deadline, the city of Shymkent in turn had extended it to 25 January 2021.

=== 2021 ===
==== January 2021 ====
On 26 January 2021, Healthcare Minister Alexey Tsoi suggested that Kazakhstan may impose a strict quarantine in order to prevent hospital burdens, warning of a possible "pessimistic scenario" where daily infections are at 9,000 and bed occupancy reaching 45,000. Tsoi recalled the probability of 3,000 daily infections is possible at the end of March while Kazakh health experts suggested that 2 million persons getting their shots in the first half of 2021 would help to reduce the number of COVID-19 cases to 40,000.

==== March 2021 ====
From 1 March 2021, quarantine measures were softened across Kazakhstan.

==== June 2021 ====
As Kazakhstan had moved to the 'green zone' with the pandemic situation, Committee for Sanitary and Epidemiological Control of the Ministry of Healthcare representative Erjan Baitanaev on 8 June 2021 hinted the possibility of easing more restrictions if the epidemiological remains stable for at least seven days.

After the SARS-CoV-2 Delta variant was detected in Astana, Prime Minister Askar Mamin at a cabinet meeting instructed to strengthen sanitary and health guidelines within the city, citing that the high incidence in the city indicates the insufficiency of the measures taken and the pace of vaccination against COVID-19. Healthcare Minister Alexey Tsoi called for the regions to provide hospitals with anything that's necessary to assist infected patients. Deputy Prime Minister Eraly Togjanov suggested that the government would consider in strengthening restriction measures in spite of the stable epidemiological situation, pointing out rapid spread of the COVID-19 worldwide.

==== July 2021 ====
On 2 July 2021, Deputy Prime Minister Eraly Togjanov announced that restrictions would be strengthened in regions located at the 'yellow zone'.

By 10 July 2021, 11 regions in Kazakhstan had tightened their measures in which six were before the Capital City Day holiday while five had done so after.

In mid-July, almost all regions in Kazakhstan were labelled in 'red zone' except for Turkistan which was at a 'yellow zone' with daily infections reaching 5.9 times higher compared to previous June month and deaths being up to 1.8% from two weeks. On 23 July, Kazakhstan recorded its highest-ever daily case number of 66,121 persons.

==== August 2021 ====
On 25 August 2021, it was announced that COVID-19 measures would be eased nationwide starting 28 August while the city of Almaty would start the process later from 4 September 2021.

==== October 2021 ====
As cases were decreasing and more than 70% of the Kazakhstan's eligible population had received a COVID-19 vaccine, Healthcare Minister Alexey Tsoi announced more easing of restrictions from 20 October 2021.

==== December 2021 ====
On 22 December 2021, Chief Sanitary Doctor of Almaty Jandarbek Bekşin warned that a new wave of the SARS-CoV-2 Omicron variant was inevitable, forecasting it to outplace the Delta variant by mid-January and the fifth wave of COVID-19 would reach its peak in mid-March 2022.

=== 2022 ===
==== January 2022 ====
On 6 January 2022, the Healthcare Ministry identified the new SARS-CoV-2 Omicron variant in Astana, upon from 8 out of 96 samples that were taken from patients who had tested positive. The Ministry noted that the new variant spreads 70 times faster contrary to the Delta variant and that it increases a risk of reinfection, recommending for Kazakh citizens to be vaccinated and receive a booster dose in a timely matter.

At the meeting of the Interdepartmental Commission for Prevention and Spread of Coronavirus Infection on 8 January 2022, Acting Healthcare Minister Jandos Bürkıtbaev outlined the worsening epidemiological situation with the rapid increase of COVID-19 cases, blaming it on the emergence of the Omicron variant, as well as high travelling activities during the holidays, and a lack of adherence to preventive measures. In response, Acting Deputy Prime Minister Eraly Togjanov instructed the Healthcare Ministry and local governments to strengthen their tasks in preventing the growing number of cases and that the forecast will depend on the population being vaccinated and boosted, calling for regional governments to strengthen work in the vaccination campaign.

Following a new wave of infections, the Healthcare Ministry initially predicted for positive cases to reach 13,000 daily. However, with growing number of positives, the Ministry increased forecast to 17,500 daily infections, recommending Kazakh citizens to refrain from visiting mass gatherings, holding and attending collective recreational events, visiting other people and receiving guests at home and observing mask compliance. The Ministry also called on unvaccinated eligible citizens undergo vaccination. On 19 January 2022, a total of 15,996 cases were recorded in Kazakhstan, the highest since July 2021.

=== 2023 ===
==== May 2023 ====
On May 28, the Ministry of Health announced that all COVID-19-related restrictions in Kazakhstan have been officially lifted.

=== By region ===
On 20 March 2020, the first case of the COVID-19 was confirmed by two plane passengers on board from Minsk to Astana, in which the flight made its emergency landing in Karaganda as a result. That same day, 8 cases were confirmed, bringing the new total to 41.

On 21 March, the virus was first detected in the Karasai District of Almaty Region.

On 22 March, a case of the coronavirus in the Aktobe Region was first discovered.

On 24 March, for the first time, three cases were confirmed in Shymkent by a man who arrived on 20 March from Astana by a passenger bus and in Jambyl by a man who arrived from Kyrgyzstan, and in North Kazakhstan by a woman who arrived from Russia.

On 26 March, two patients were discharged in Astana and Almaty, and that same day, a first death from COVID-19 was reported in Astana, which was 64-year old resident from the village of Kosshi.

On 27 March, the first cases of COVID-19 were confirmed in Atyrau, Pavlodar, and Mangistau regions.

On 28 March, the first cases of the virus were found in East Kazakhstan and Kyzylorda regions.

On 29 March, first case of the coronavirus was confirmed in the West Kazakhstan region.

On 31 March, COVID-19 was found in the Turkistan Region.

On 3 April, the Kostanay Region confirmed its first case of the coronavirus, making it the last region to do so.

== Statistics ==
=== Cumulative cases, recoveries and deaths per day ===
View source data.

=== New cases per day ===
View source data.

=== New deaths per day ===
View source data.

=== Cases per regions ===
View source data.

== Government responses ==
Kazakhstan has spent $13 billion on pandemic response amounting to more than 8 percent of its GDP.

=== Prevention ===
On 24 January, Almaty International Airport staff and Almaty medical brigades had a medical exercise. The situation where a plane arrives from China with an infected passenger was simulated. Also, disinformation was spreading through messengers about infected people in Almaty. It was disproved by the Minister of Healthcare.

As of 25 January, 98 Kazakh students were in Wuhan, but none were known to be infected.

From 26 January 2020, sanitary and epidemiological control at checkpoints across the border was strengthened, and training exercises were held. In addition, medical monitoring was provided for people arriving from China, and the 72-hour visa-free stay for Chinese citizens in Kazakhstan was suspended.

The country faced a shortage of medical masks in pharmacies. Subsequently, it was reported that speculators who bought masks sold them at higher prices.

On 27 January, an interdepartmental commission was created under the Kazakh government to coordinate activities to prevent the occurrence and spread of the coronavirus. It was chaired by Deputy Prime Minister Berdibek Saparbayev, which included all the intrigued governmental bodies and akims of the regions and cities of Astana, Alma-Ata and Shymkent.

As of 28 January, more than 1300 Kazakh citizens are in China, more than 600 of them are tourists, mostly visiting Hainan. The government of Kazakhstan is ready to evacuate the 98 Kazakh students in Wuhan. Also, Kazakhstan plans to temporarily stop trains between Ürümqi, Xinjiang, China and Kazakh cities.

On 29 January, the commission decided to suspend the issuance of visas to Chinese citizens, and starting from January 29 to suspend passenger bus services between Kazakhstan and China, from 1 February to suspend passenger trains along the routes between Kazakhstan and China, and from 3 February to suspend regular air traffic between Kazakhstan and China. A proposal to transfer the Federation Cup qualifiers from the Dongguan to Astana from February 4 to 8 was rejected by the International Tennis Federation. The Asian Water Polo Championship was also canceled from 12 February to 16.

On 31 January, a second stage of strengthening sanitary and epidemiological control had started. 150 sanitary and epidemiological service specialists were additionally sent to quarantine centers at all borders, a laboratory diagnosis of the virus was established, and clinical treatment protocols and algorithms of anti-epidemic measures were approved.

On 2 February, 83 Kazakhs were evacuated from the Chinese city of Wuhan, where the COVID-19 pandemic began, of which 80 were students. After being inspected, the arrivals were placed in quarantine for 14 days in a specially designated building at the multidisciplinary hospital that was located 7 km from Astana. On 5 February, by the request of the Kazakh government, another 8 Kazakhs were evacuated from Wuhan by the assistance of Russia and Uzbekistan. 5 citizens were under medical supervision in Tashkent for two weeks, and the other three in Tyumen.

From 20 February, a methodology had been introduced for ranking countries into 3 categories, depending on the degree of risk of the spread of the coronavirus. Depending on the level of risk, people arriving from countries that were facing serious outbreaks according to KVI, faced monitoring.

On 23 February, a flight carrying passengers from Tokyo to Astana was quarantined which included 20 Kazakhs and 4 people from the Diamond Princess cruise, that faced the outbreak of the COVID-19 on board. The investigation did not reveal the presence of virus.

On 26 February, a decision was made starting from 1 March to suspend flights from Iran and limit the number of flights to South Korea from 9 to 3 per week. On March 2, it was also decided to introduce from March 5 a temporary ban on Iranian citizens entering Kazakhstan and to suspend the Astana-Baku flight, limit the number of flights of the Almaty-Baku route from five to one per week, and on the Aktau-Baku route from seven to one per week.

From 1 March, the Ministry of Health introduced the fourth stage of strengthening. Travelers arrival from category 1a countries were placed in quarantine for 14 days, and under medical supervision for 10 days. People arriving from category 1b countries were placed in home quarantine for 14 days. By the decision of the sanitary service, these arrivals could be quarantined in a medical facility. People arriving from countries of the second category were under medical supervision at home for 14 days, followed by a 10-day call. Others who arrived from countries of the third category were remotely monitored for 24 days. The ministry said that there were no cases of virus in which the statement received criticism from the public which claimed that the coronavirus was already in Kazakhstan considering its close proximity and shared border with China that remained open for a while prior. This led to many rumors that the Kazakh government was purposely hiding the cases of COVID-19 in the country to which the Minister of Information and Public Development Dauren Abaev dismissed these claims on 12 March.

=== Nationwide measures ===
On 15 March, President Tokayev imposed a state of emergency from 8 am on 16 March 2020 to 7 am on 15 April 2020. He also on 17 March ordered the cancellations of both the Nowruz celebrations as well as the military parade in honor of the 75th anniversary of Victory Day.

For the duration of the state of emergency, the following measures and time limits were introduced:

- The protection of public order, the protection of especially important state and strategic, especially regime, sensitive and specially protected objects, as well as objects ensuring the vital activity of the population and the functioning of transport, have been strengthened.
- The function of large trading facilities is limited.
- The activity of shopping and entertainment centers, cinemas, theaters, exhibitions and other objects with a large crowd of people is suspended.
- Quarantine is introduced, large-scale sanitary and anti-epidemic measures are carried out, including with the participation of structural units of the Ministry of Defense and internal affairs bodies operating in the field of sanitary and epidemiological welfare of the population.
- It is forbidden to conduct entertainment, sports and other public events, as well as family, commemorative events;
- Restrictions are established on entry into the territory of the Republic of Kazakhstan, as well as on exit from its territory by all means of transport, with the exception of personnel of the diplomatic service of Kazakhstan and foreign states, as well as members of delegations of international organizations traveling to the country at the invitation of the Ministry of Foreign Affairs of Kazakhstan.

From 19 March, around the border of several regions of Kazakhstan and large settlements, round-the-clock sanitary posts were posted.

=== Lockdowns ===
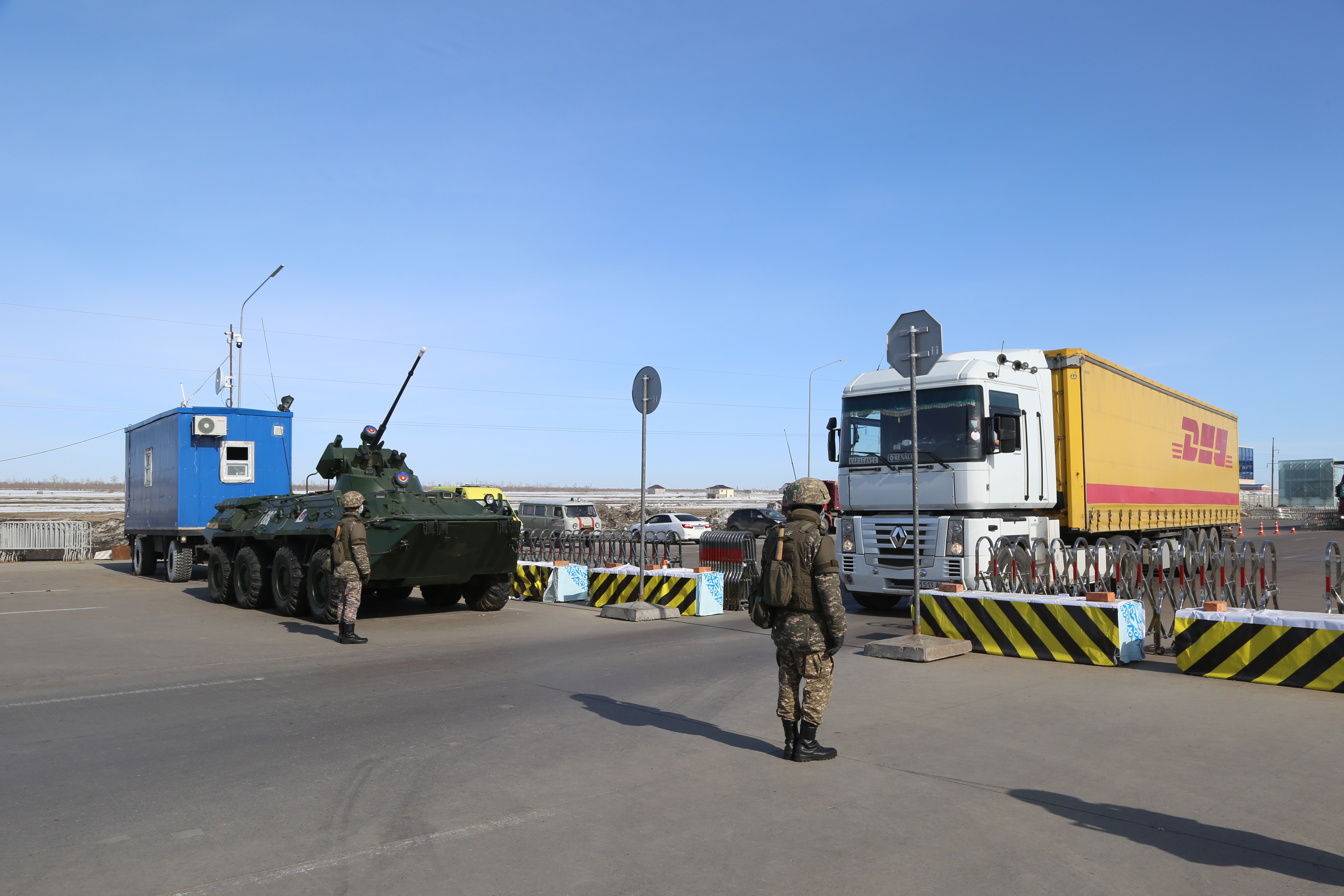
Checkpoint at the exit of Astana during lockdown, 26 March 2020

On 19 March 2020, in the cities of Astana and Almaty, by the decision of the State Commission for ensuring the state of emergency, a quarantine was introduced which included restrictions on the entry and exit of people. Under the quarantine, entry to these cities was restricted, roadblocks were set up at the entrances to cities. Large shopping malls in the cities were closed, with the exception of grocery stores and pharmacies. To pass truckload of food, a "green corridor" was organized. Several residential complexes and high-rise buildings were isolated in Almaty after detection of the coronavirus in residents. Territories of houses were cordoned off, a checkpoint was installed around the perimeter. According to the rules of quarantine, none of the residents could leave the residential complex nor receive any guests.

On 22 March 2020, the entrances and exits from Almaty and Astana have been completely blocked, including for air and rail services. Only after that day, trains can only transit without passengers disembarking and boarding. By the decision of the operational headquarters to prevent the spread of COVID-19 in Astana, all air passengers arriving from abroad were forbidden to travel to the city without passing analysis and obtaining results on the virus. Arrivals from abroad were accommodated in hotels deployed as medical hospitals, where health workers took tests. The mayor of Almaty, Bakytzhan Sagintayev said that to support the people who found themselves in difficulty, he agreed with the monopolists to defer payments on all utility services, including an elevator and garbage collection. Also, service providers did not disconnect debtor consumers from electricity, water, heat, gas, and telephone communications during the quarantine period.

On 26 March 2020, the quarantine regime had been tightened in Almaty. All the objects of trade and services were closed in the city, except for food stores and pharmacies.

On 28 March 2020, by the decision of the State Commission for the state of emergency, the quarantine had been strengthened: in Astana and Almaty, the exit of citizens from their places of residence became limited, with the exception of the purchase of food, medicine and going to work. All crowded places were closed, public transport is limited, a ban on gathering on the streets and in public places by groups of more than three people, unaccompanied adults, with the exception of family members, became prohibited. A 14-day quarantine was also introduced in the "20 Years of Independence" housing estate in the Abay district of Shymkent with the organization of a house-bypass. The city also suspended the activity of the airport, railway and bus stations, kindergartens. A ban was placed on entry and exit on the territory of the city of Shymkent from 21:00 to 07:00, public catering facilities public transport was also limited.

From 30 March to 5 April, in Astana and Almaty, the activities of all enterprises and organizations were suspended, regardless of ownership, with the exception of central government bodies, mayors, law enforcement agencies, healthcare organizations, the media, grocery stores, pharmacies and life support organizations.

On 30 March, a quarantine was placed in Atyrau and Karaganda, with its satellite cities of Abay, Saran, Temirtau, Shakhtinsk. A special regime was introduced in Aktau and a regular meeting of the regional headquarters on the state of emergency took place. In order to prevent the spread of coronavirus in the territory of Pavlodar region, it was decided to strengthen the existing sanitary and anti-epidemic measures and introduce additional measures. Nine roadblocks were put up around the entire perimeter of the region, residents were restricted from leaving apartments and houses after 22:00, except for going to pharmacies and grocery stores within the radius of their residence, to work and cases of seeking medical help, the disinfection and anti-epidemic regime was strengthened, including public transport, crowded places, shops, shopping centers and houses, residential buildings, and at bus stops.

On 31 March, the entrance to the Kostanay region was closed. A quarantine was introduced to the Akmola and West Kazakhstan region, and a number of restrictive measures were established in the city of Shymkent and the regions of Aktobe and Zhambyl, including closing the entrance and exit from the region.

On 1 April, quarantine was placed in Pavlodar and North Kazakhstan regions and both the Nursultan Nazarbayev Airport and Almaty Airport have stopped accepting all international and evacuation flights.

On 2 April, an entry and exit to the quarantine zone of the Karaganda Region was completely closed, and the activities of airports, air and railway stations have been discontinued. A quarantine was introduced to the cities of Ust-Kamenogorsk and Semey. In addition, additional restrictive measures have been introduced in the Kordai District which are a ban on grazing and the use of public transport.

=== Fighting misinformation ===
Some critics of the government have been arrested for allegedly spreading false information about the COVID-19 pandemic.

=== International measures ===
Kazakhstan has provided regional neighbors with relief aid.

=== Vaccination ===
Kazakhstan has created its own COVID-19 vaccination, QazCovid-in, developed by the Research Institute for Biological Safety Problems. On 7 April 2021, the healthcare minister Alexey Tsoi announced the Kazakh government had requested 4 million doses of Russia's Sputnik V vaccine, in addition to 2 million doses already received earlier in 2021, as part of an ongoing vaccination programme alongside QazCovid-in.

== Genetic diversity of SARS-CoV-2 in Kazakhstan ==
Virus sequencing efforts identified representatives of five of the eight global SARS-CoV-2 clades circulating in Kazakhstan early in the pandemic. Most SARS-CoV-2 isolates in Kazakhstan belonged to clades O or S, descendants of the early Asian lineages. Researchers hypothesized that the high prevalence of O and S sub-types in Kazakhstan suggests that COVID-19 was imported into Kazakhstan weeks prior to the international travel ban declaration. Interestingly, other virus strains described in Kazakhstan clustered with viruses from Europe, while the Kazakhstan O clade isolates grouped with Middle Eastern (particularly, Iranian) strains. A unique lineage (B.4.1) is thought to have risen independently in Kazakhstan. These data are in line with the evidence that southern Europe and the Middle East were early points of COVID-19 introduction and spread. Presence of multiple clade G lineages indicated multiple independent importations from Europe and the Americas into Kazakhstan.

=== Economy ===
The total cost of anti-crisis measures amounted to over 4 trillion tenge. These expenses were provided at the expense of the state budget in the amount of 2.1 trillion tenge, attraction of funds for infrastructure bonds, guaranteed transfer from the National Fund for 1.8 trillion tenge.

To support businessmen whose financial situation worsened due to the state of emergency, the government of Kazakhstan provided an exemption from payment of taxes until 31 December 2020 which were: property tax for legal entities and individual entrepreneurs at large retail facilities, trade entertainment centers, cinemas, theaters, exhibitions, and fitness and sports facilities, land tax on agricultural lands of agricultural producers, individual income tax of individual entrepreneurs working in the generally established taxation procedure. President Tokayev also suspended interest on unfulfilled tax liabilities until 15 August 2020 and postponed the deadline for submitting tax reports for the third quarter of 2020.

Working citizens of Kazakhstan who lost income during a state of emergency due to being forced to leave their jobs without pay received financial support from the state social insurance fund. The amount of social benefits per employee amounted to 42.5 thousand tenge per month.

On 31 March 2020, President Tokayev on-air spoke about additional opportunities to support the public and businesses in connection with the state of emergency, including an indication of pensions and general benefits, including targeted social assistance, providing coverage with additional social benefits by 10% in annual terms, extend the list of categories of citizens who were supposed to be provided with free grocery and household sets from 1 April to 1 July, supporting farmers to timely carry out spring field work, and provide work around large quarantined cities for small and medium business for 6 months.

The postal service suspended international mail to many countries.
