= Askhat Shakharov =

Kazakh politician (born 1964)

Ashat Şaharov
- Асхат Шахаров
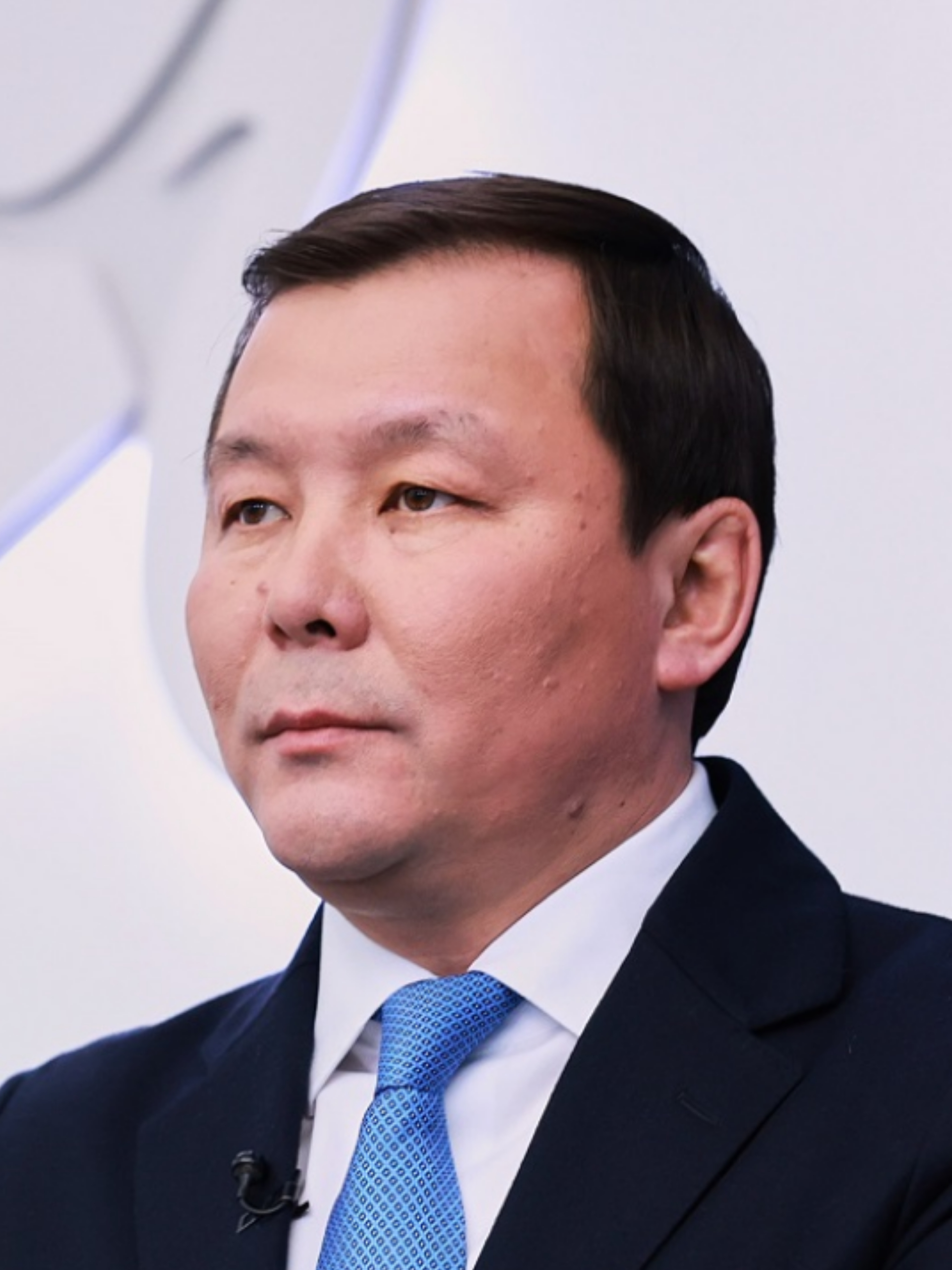
- Şaharov in 2024

Äkim of Aktobe Region
- Incumbent
- Assumed office 5 September 2023
- Preceded by: Eraly Togjanov

Äkim of Aktobe
- In office 16 March 2020 – November 2022

Personal details
- Born: 3 October 1978 (age 47) Akbulak, Orenburg Oblast, RSFSR, Soviet Union
- Education: Kazakh Sport and Tourism Academy; Narxoz University; Russian Academy of Public Administration
- Profession: PE teacher; economist
- Judo career
Medal record
Representing Kazakhstan
Men's judo
World Championships
Bronze medal – third place	2001 Birmingham	-73 kg
Asian Championships
Silver medal – second place	2000 Osaka	-73 kg

Profile at external judo databases
- JudoInside.com: 9175

Ashat Berleşūly Şaharov (Note: Often transliterated as Askhat Bershuly Shakharov through a Russified Romanization of Асхат Берлешулы Шахаров.) (as-HAT sha-HA-roff; Kazakh: Асхат Берлешұлы Шахаров; born 3 October 1978) is a Kazakh politician, economist, and former judoka, who's currently serving as Äkim of Aktobe Region since September 2023.

Before politics, he competed in the men's lightweight event at the 2000 Summer Olympics.
