= COVID-19 vaccination in Kazakhstan =

Plan to immunize against COVID-19

- Share of population in Kazakhstan that has received at least one dose of COVID-19 vaccine by region as of 29 July 2022
- Date: 1 February 2021 – present
- Location: Kazakhstan
- Cause: COVID-19 pandemic in Kazakhstan

COVID-19 vaccination in Kazakhstan is an ongoing immunization campaign against severe acute respiratory syndrome coronavirus 2 (SARS-CoV-2), the virus that causes coronavirus disease 2019 (COVID-19), in response to the ongoing pandemic in the country.

== Background ==
Shortly after the COVID-19 outbreak in Kazakhstan, Erlan Ramanqūlov, the Director General of the National Center for Biotechnology announced in April 2020 the stages on developing the COVID-19 vaccine, acknowledging that clinical trials usually take up to 10 years to develop and that all verified research process would be cut short due to the intense situation in the country, expediting the coronavirus vaccine production and forecasted that it would be available to the public within the next year and a half.

On 18 May 2020, the Ministry of Education and Science announced that the preclinical trials for the local COVID-19 vaccine had begun of which was developed by the employees of the Research Institute of Biological Safety Problems of the Science Committee (BQPĞZÏ) under the Ministry by the strain of the coronavirus isolated from patients and that the World Health Organization (WHO) had registered the vaccine development. At the cabinet meeting, Education and Science Minister Ashat Aimagambetov announced that five COVID-19 vaccines were being developed and that the preclinical trials would be tested on animals until September 2020, when the clinical stages would begin for humans. In August 2020, the National Center for Expertise of Medicines and Medical Devices reported that the QazCovid-in vaccine showed no dangers during preclinical study stage and ruled that the testing could advance further into clinical trials on humans. Starting 1 September 2020, the BQPĞZI began recruiting volunteers for conducting clinical trials of QazCovid-in. In December 2020, the Ministry of Healthcare approved the final phase III of clinical trials by the BQPĞZI for 3,000 volunteers, by which the institute reported 96% efficiency rate of QazCovid-in.

Kazakhstan has created its own COVID-19 vaccination, QazCovid-in, developed by the Research Institute for Biological Safety Problems. On 7 April 2021, the Healthcare Minister Alexey Tsoi announced that the Kazakh government had requested 4 million doses of Russia's Sputnik V vaccine, in addition to 2 million doses already received earlier in 2021, as part of an ongoing vaccination programme alongside QazCovid-in.

In October 2021, the first Kazakh vaccine to protect cats from COVID-19, NARUVAX-C19, was unveiled at the Kazagro/Kazfarm-2021 international exhibition.

=== Vaccine in order ===
Vaccine	Approval	Deployment
Sputnik V	Yes	Yes
QazCovid-in	Yes	Yes
Sinopharm BIBP	Yes	Yes
Sinovac	Yes	Yes
Sputnik Light	Yes	No
QazCoVac-P	No	No

=== Vaccination rate by region ===
Region	Vaccinated population (as of 29 July 2022)					
Region	Amount			Percentage		
Region	1st dose	2nd dose	Booster dose	1st dose	2nd dose	Booster dose
Akmola Region	376,526	363,785		51.3%	49.6%	
Aktobe Region	442,646	435,541		48.6%	47.8%	
Almaty Region	1,183,805	1,130,834		55.9%	53.4%	
Atyrau Region	292,152	276,467		43.4%	41.1%	
East Kazakhstan Region	1,032,215	1,025,710		76.2%	75.7%	
Jambyl Region	772,156	762,453		67.0%	66.1%	
Karaganda Region	726,370	678,609		53.0%	49.5%	
Kostanay Region	380,772	367,483		44.5%	42.9%	
Kyzylorda Region	516,071	510,599		62.0%	61.4%	
Mangystau Region	279,861	272,261		37.3%	36.3%	
Pavlodar Region	385,060	375,954		51.6%	50.4%	
North Kazakhstan Region	342,656	338,133		64.1%	63.3%	
Turkistan Region	1,294,982	1,290,145		62.0%	61.8%	
West Kazakhstan Region	297,268	287,561		44.5%	43.1%	
Almaty	1,211,479	1,186,646		59.1%	57.9%	
Nur-Sultan	542,653	516,130		43.0%	40.9%	
Shymkent	707,126	696,298		62.9%	61.9%	
Kazakhstan	10,783,798	10,514,609	5,012,630	57.5%	56.1%	26.7%
Total doses:	26,311,037					
