= Bekbol Sagyn =

- Бекбол Сағын

Akim of Aktobe
- In office October 2015 – July 2016
- Appointed by: Berdibek Saparbayev
- Preceded by: Erkhan Umarov

Deputy Akim
- In office February 2004 – August 2004

Bekbol Sagyn (Kazakh: Бекбол Ұбайдоллаұлы Сағын, Bekbol Ubaıdollauly Saģyn; born in 1972) Kazakh statesman.

== Biography ==
Sagyn was born in 1972 in Aktobe. He enrolled in the Kazakh State Academy of Management. He did not graduate but transferred to the Kazakh Humanitarian Law University, and later graduated from the Kazakh Engineering and Technical Academy with an undergraduate degree. Sagyn later received a graduate degree in economic sciences.

He began his professional career in 1993 by working in the financial systems of the region. From 1998 to 2003, he was employed in numerous tax departments of the Aktobe region. He also served as deputy head of education for the entire Aktobe region from 2003 to 2004. In addition, he served as the deputy akim (mayor) of the Aktobe region from February 2004 to August later that year.

Sagyn was appointed to the position of Akim Aktobe in October 2015. His predecessor Erkhan Umarov had decided to move to a new employment, thus leaving the mayor position empty. In Kazakhstan, akims are not elected locally, but are appointed by the regional governor of the Aktobe. The governor Berdibek Saparbayev accepted the resignation of the predecessor and, on the advice of the president, appointed Sagyn. In July 2016, he left the post of akim.

He delivered remarks on the state of the district and a plan of the future, an open forum hosted by the Akim of Alamty at the Eurasian National University. There, he laid out a vision for 2020 and laid out the future of the region, and later listening to and answering the questions regarding the needs of the people, especially the elderly.

Sagyn helped sponsor the construction of the largest ice rink in Astana in 2015.
