= List of Äkims of East Kazakhstan Region =

This is the list of äkıms of East Kazakhstan Region that have held the position since 1992.

== List of Äkıms ==
- Amangeldı Bektemısov (10 February 1992 – 17 June 1994)
- Yuri Lavrinenko (17 June 1994 – 28 November 1995)
- Leonid Desyatnik (28 November 1995 – 29 April 1996)
- Qajymūrat Nağymanov (29 April 1996 – 10 April 1997)
- Vitaly Mette (17 April 1997 – 26 February 2003)
- Talğatbek Abaidıldin (26 February 2003 – 8 December 2004)
- Viktor Khrapunov (8 December 2004 – 11 January 2007)
- Jänıbek Kärıbjanov (11 January 2007 – 7 May 2008)
- Ädılğazy Bergenov (7 May 2008 – 4 March 2009)
- Berdıbek Saparbaev (4 March 2009 – 11 November 2014)
- Danial Ahmetov (11 November 2014 – 16 June 2023 )
- Ermek Köşerbaev (16 June 2023 – 14 February 2025)
- Nurymbet Saqtağanov (since 17 February 2025)
