= Ondasyn Orazalin =

Kazakh politician

Ondassyn Urazalin
- Оңдасын Оразалин
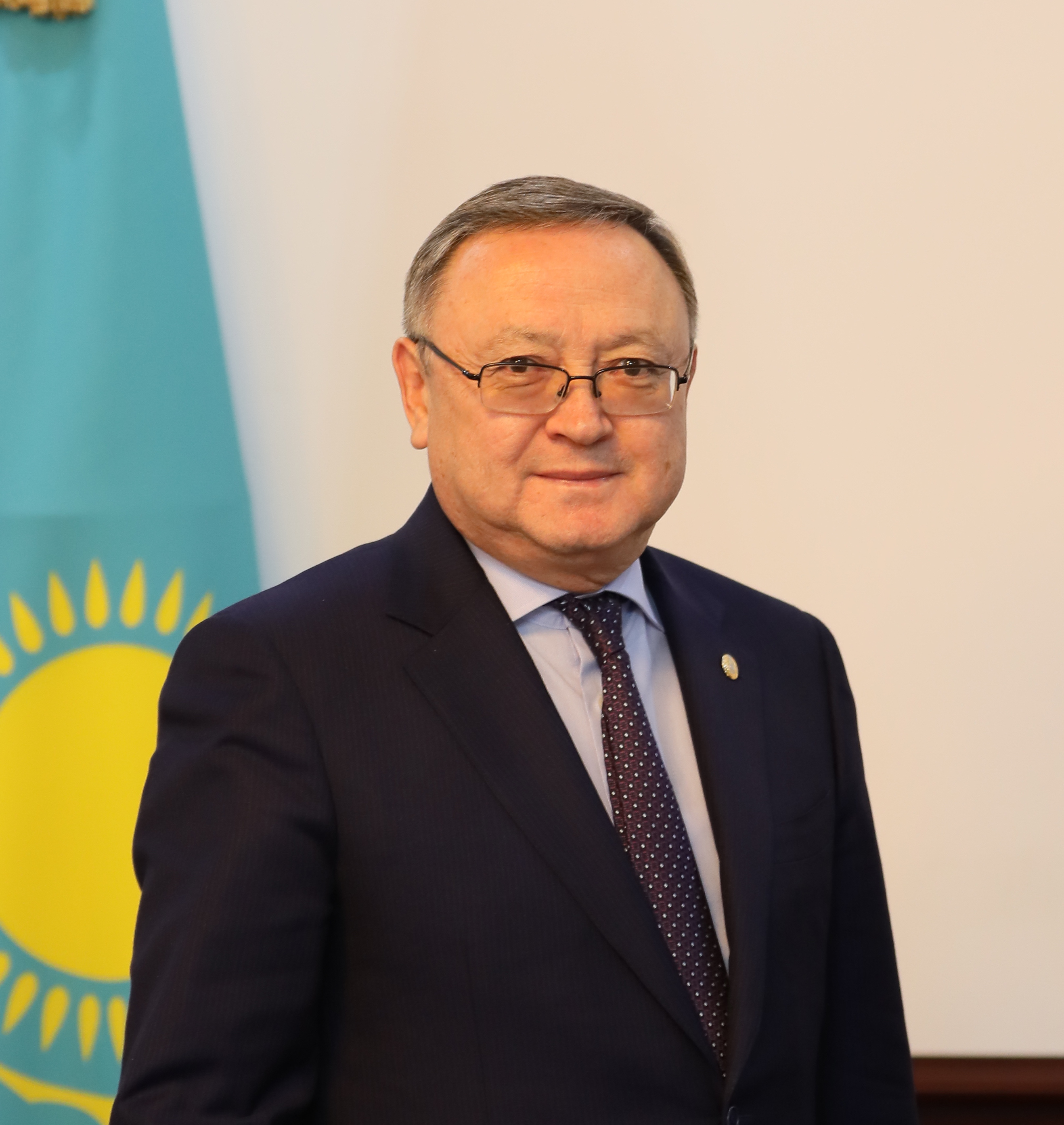
- Urazalin in 2019

Äkim of Aktobe Region
- In office 25 February 2019 – 31 August 2022
- Preceded by: Berdibek Saparbayev
- Succeeded by: Eraly Togjanov

Deputy Chief of Staff of the Presidential Executive Office of Kazakhstan
- In office 22 March 2017 – 26 February 2019
- President: Nursultan Nazarbayev
- Prime Minister: Bakhytzhan Sagintayev; Askar Mamin
- Preceded by: Kumar Aksakalov
- Succeeded by: Malik Murzalin

Leader of Nur Otan in Aktobe Region
- In office 29 March 2019 – 2024?
- Preceded by: Berdibek Saparbayev
- Succeeded by: Erbol Danağulov?

Personal details
- Born: 6 November 1963 (age 62) Aktobe, Aktobe Region, Kazakh SSR, Soviet Union
- Party: Nur Otan
- Education: Aktobe Pedagogical Institute; Al-Farabi Kazakh National University

Oñdasyn Seiılūly Orazalin (Kazakh: Оңдасын Сейілұлы Оразалин; born 6 November 1963) is a Kazakh politician and is the current Äkim of Aktobe Region. He served as Deputy Chief of Staff of the Presidential Executive Office of Kazakhstan from 2017 to 2019.

== Biography ==
Ondassyn Urazalin graduated from Aktobe pedagogical institute with the diploma of “teacher of English language” in 1985. In 1991 he graduated from Kazakh State University named after Al-Farabi with law major.

=== Career ===
- Teacher of Aktobe Pedagogical Institute (1985-1988);
- Secretary of Komsomol of Aktobe Pedagogical Institute (1988-1990);
- Head of the advertisement department of information agency of LPP “Rika-TV” (1990-1993);
- Chairman of the executive board of "Bank-Rika" (1993-1999);
- Chairman of the executive board of CJC “Obltransgaz”, CJC “Aktobegaz” (1999-2000).
- Akim of Mugalzhar district of Aktobe Region (2000-2003);
- Head of Aktobe Region department of foreign trade communications and investments (2003-2004);
- Director of the department of internal policy of Aktobe Region (09.2004-09.2005);
- Deputy Governor of Aktobe Region (09.2005-11.2006);
- In 2006 he started working for the Presidential Executive Office of Kazakhstan as State Inspector. Later he had been promoted to Deputy Head Department of State Control and Organization-Territorial Work (2007-2014);
- Head of the Department of State Control and Organization-Territorial Work of the Presidential Executive Office of Kazakhstan (05.2014-22.03.2017);
- Deputy Chief of Staff of the Presidential Executive Office of Kazakhstan (22.03.2017-25.02.2019);
- Governor of Aktobe Region (26.02.2019-31.08.2022).

== Awards ==
- The Order of Kurmet (2008)
- The Order of Parasat (2014)
