= Ermek Köşerbaev =

Kazakh politician and diplomat

- Ермек Көшербаев
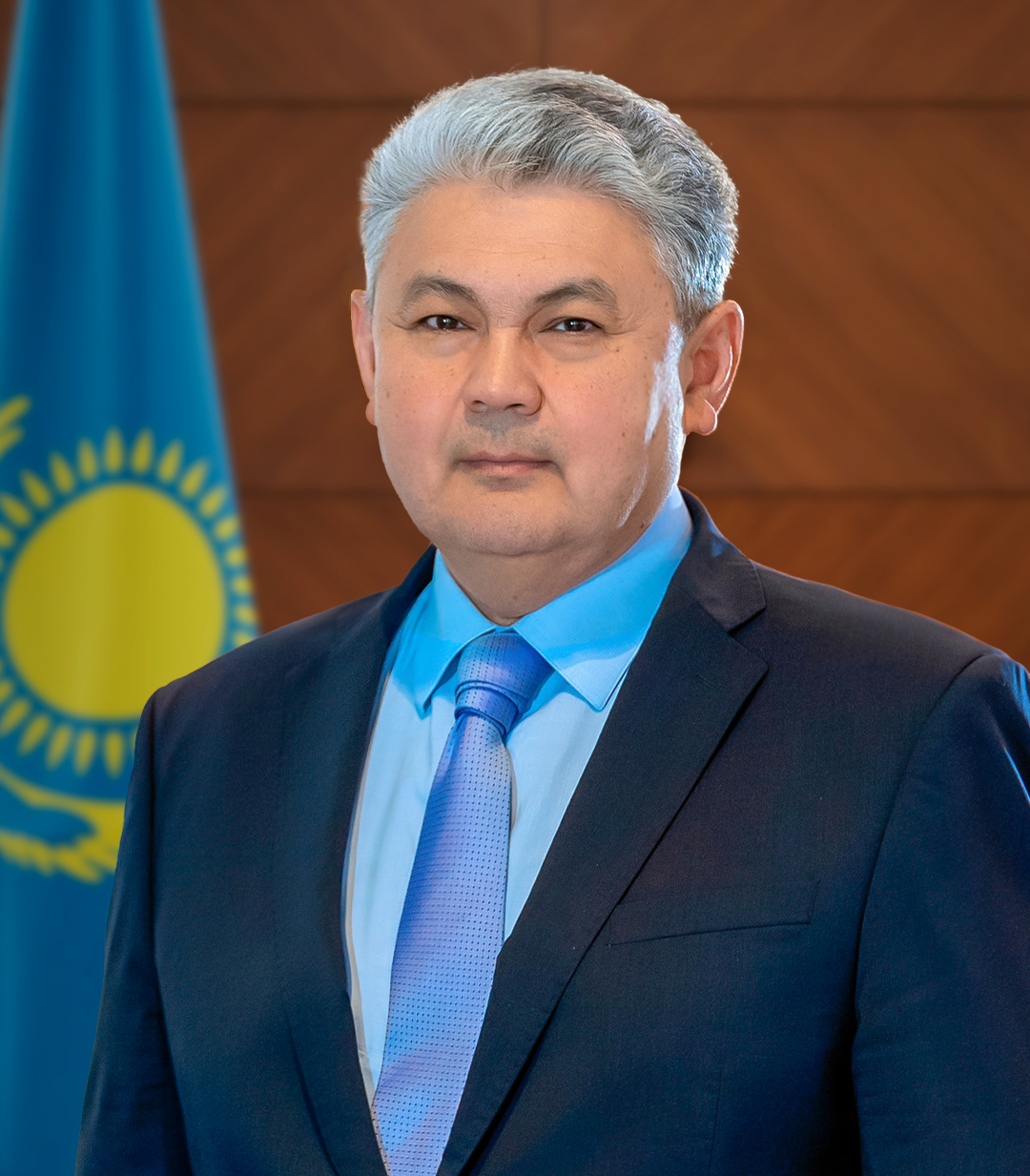
- Official portrait, 2025

Minister of Foreign Affairs
- In office 26 September 2025 – 2 September 2026
- President: Kassym-Jomart Tokayev
- Prime Minister: Oljas Bektenov
- Preceded by: Murat Nurtileu
- Succeeded by: Mukhtar Tleuberdi

Deputy Prime Minister of Kazakhstan
- In office 14 February 2025 – 26 September 2025
- Prime Minister: Oljas Bektenov
- Preceded by: Tamara Duisenova
- Succeeded by: Aida Balaeva

Akim of the East Kazakhstan Region
- In office 16 June 2023 – 14 February 2025
- Preceded by: Daniyal Akhmetov
- Succeeded by: Nurymbet Saqtağanov

Kazakh ambassador to Russia
- In office 29 January 2020 – 16 June 2023
- President: Kassym-Jomart Tokayev
- Preceded by: Imangali Tasmagambetov
- Succeeded by: Dauren Abaev

Personal details
- Born: 2 May 1965 (age 61) Alma-Ata, Kazakh SSR, Soviet Union
- Spouse: Dinara Şaijünisova
- Children: 2
- Education: Kirov Kazakh State University; Diplomatic Academy of the Ministry of Foreign Affairs of the USSR
- Awards: Order of Kurmet

Ermek Bedelbaiūly Köşerbaev (Note: Often transliterated as Yermek Bedelbayevich Kosherbayev through a Russified Romanization of Ермек Беделбаевич Кошербаев.) (KOH-sher-ba-yef; Kazakh: Ермек Беделбайұлы Көшербаев; born 2 May 1965) is a Kazakh politician and diplomat who served as Minister of Foreign Affairs of the Republic of Kazakhstan from 2025 to 2026. Previously, he was Deputy Prime Minister of Kazakhstan from 14 February to 26 September 2025 and akim of the East Kazakhstan Region from 2023 to 2025, and Kazakh ambassador to Russia from 2020 to 2023. He holds the diplomatic rank of Adviser of the First Class.

== Early life and education ==
Ermek Köşerbaev was born on 2 May 1965 in Alma-Ata (now Almaty). In 1988, he graduated from the Kirov Kazakh State University with a degree in history, qualifying as a teacher of history with instruction in a foreign language. In April 1993, he graduated from the Diplomatic Academy of the Ministry of Foreign Affairs of the USSR with a degree in international relations and foreign policy.

== Early career ==
He began his professional career in August 1988 at the Ministry of Foreign Affairs of the Kazakh SSR, serving initially as a senior inspector for classified records management. From September 1988 to October 1989, he was assistant to the minister of foreign affairs of the Kazakh SSR, followed by appointments as first secretary of the Press and Information Department from November 1989 to June 1990 and first secretary of the Consular Department from June 1990 to September 1991.

After completing his studies at the Diplomatic Academy, Köşerbaev held a series of senior positions within the Ministry of Foreign Affairs of Kazakhstan and the Presidential Administration, including head of the Department of State Protocol from December 1993 to June 1994, consultant of the International Department of the Office of the President from June 1994 to January 1996, and acting head of the Presidential Protocol Service from January to April 1996. From April 1996 to August 1997, Köşerbaev served as first secretary of the Embassy of the Republic of Kazakhstan in the Swiss Confederation, based in Bern. After returning to Kazakhstan, he held a number of senior positions in government, political organizations, state companies, and public associations, including assistant to the prime minister of the Republic of Kazakhstan from October 1997 to November 1999, senior management roles at the Nursultan Nazarbayev Educational Foundation from January to October 2000, and leadership positions within national companies and media organizations, such as KazTransOil, KazMunayGas, and Rauan Media Group between 2000 and 2009. He also worked in party administration, serving in senior roles at the Otan Republican Political Party and the Atameken National Union of Entrepreneurs and Employers of Kazakhstan.

== Political career ==
=== Ambassador of Kazakhstan to the Russian Federation (2020–2023) ===
On 29 January 2020, Köşerbaev was appointed as 11th ambassador extraordinary and plenipotentiary of the Republic of Kazakhstan to the Russian Federation, succeeding Imangali Tasmagambetov. Upon his appointment, President Kassym-Jomart Tokayev emphasized the importance of developing strategic and allied relations between Kazakhstan and Russia and instructed him to focus on comprehensive cooperation in political, economic, and integration processes.

In January 2021, acting on behalf of the president of Kazakhstan, Köşerbaev presented Russian foreign minister Sergey Lavrov with the Order of Barys (First Class).

During the January 2022 unrest in Kazakhstan, Köşerbaev publicly commented, stating that Kazakhstan’s internal developments were not the result of foreign interference, and continued diplomatic engagement with Russian authorities within the CSTO framework. He also reported that more than 170 Kazakh citizens in Russia were temporarily unable to return home due to logistical disruptions.

Kosherbayev maintained that Kazakhstan remained committed to deepening strategic partnership with Russia, including through cooperation within regional organisations and alliance frameworks, reaffirming the continuity of bilateral relations despite international tensions associated with the Ukraine conflict. In June 2022, during an interview to Russia-24 following the Russian invasion of Ukraine, he stated that Kazakhstan would not join international sanctions against Russia, emphasizing that Russia remained Kazakhstan's closest neighbour and key partner, and that Kazakhstan's foreign policy would not contradict bilateral partnership even amid Western sanctions regimes.

=== Akim of East Kazakhstan Region (2023–2025) ===
On 16 June 2023, Köşerbaev was appointed as the akim of East Kazakhstan Region on 16 June 2023.

During his leadership, Köşerbaev personally oversaw responses to a number of serious emergencies, including a fatal boiler explosion in Zaisan in October 2023, a deadly gas poisoning incident at the Irtysh mine operated by KAZ Minerals in August 2024, and an explosion at a thermal power plant in Ridder in December 2024.

In 2023, Köşerbaev declared 2024 the "Year of Roads" in the region, after which approximately 600 kilometers of roads were repaired or reconstructed. One of the most notable completed projects was the bridge across the Bukhtarma Reservoir, opened in October 2023, which connected several previously isolated districts.

In November 2024, severe air pollution in Oskemen led to emergency measures, including temporary distance learning for schools. In response, Köşerbaev announced the creation of a specialized "Oskemen Tynysy" Bureau of Environmental Protection to conduct independent monitoring and audits of industrial emissions.

Flood prevention in East Kazakhstan Region became another priority, with record funding 2.1 billion tenge allocated for dam construction, riverbed clearing, and the introduction of risk mapping and forecasting tools, with artificial intelligence being deployed for the first time to assess the likelihood of flooding and develop response algorithms.

In addition, Köşerbaev supported the development of tourism, agriculture, youth policy, and national culture in the region, including the promotion of national sports and cultural events such as the international "Shyǵys Salburyny" festival.

=== Deputy Prime Minister of Kazakhstan ===
After his appointment as Deputy Prime Minister of Kazakhstan on 14 February 2025, Köşerbaev oversaw a range of social policy, public safety, education, and regional oversight initiatives.

One of the central priorities of his work was the protection of medical workers. In response to a rise in attacks on doctors and ambulance staff, amendments were introduced to the Criminal Code establishing criminal liability for threats and violence against medical personnel, with penalties comparable to those for attacks on law enforcement officers.

Köşerbaev also led efforts to reform sanitary and epidemiological supervision following cases of mass food poisoning in schools and kindergartens. Supervisory powers of sanitary authorities were expanded, unannounced inspections were increased, children's facilities were placed under special control, and mandatory sanitary certification was introduced for summer camps.

In the sphere of social policy, he supervised measures to improve the targeting and efficiency of social spending. Inspections identified cases of improper benefit payments, prompting optimization of programs, tighter monitoring, and a reduction of duplicative mechanisms.

He supported the digitalization of education, including pilot projects using artificial intelligence in schools and universities. Language and accessibility projects were also developed, including Kazakh-language AI systems and digital tools for people with disabilities.

Under his coordination, the government continued the regional expansion of international higher education. New foreign university branches were opened in the regions, including Woosong University Kazakhstan in Turkistan.

Köşerbaev carried out regional inspections, including visits to tourist zones such as the Alakol coast in July 2025, where he assessed infrastructure, sanitation, and service quality, emphasizing direct engagement with local issues.

=== Minister of Foreign Affairs ===
On 26 September 2025, he was appointed Minister of Foreign Affairs.

== Personal life ==
Köşerbaev is married to Dinara Şaijünisova, the daughter of Marken Şaijünisov, who served as akim of the city of Semey from 1998 to 2000. Her brother, Dalen Şaijünisov, is married to the daughter of Dariga Nazarbayeva. They have two children Dastan Köşerbaev (born 1988) and Dameli Ermekovna (born 1993).

Kosherbayev is polyglot and speaks Kazakh, Russian, English, German, and Korean.

== Awards ==
- Order of Kurmet (14 December 2018)
