= List of ambassadors of Kazakhstan to Russia =

Coordinates: 55.792263°N 37.782924°E

Ambassador of Kazakhstan to Russia
- Incumbent; Yermek Kosherbayev since December 18, 2019
- Inaugural holder: Tair Mansurov
- Formation: January 1, 1994

The Kazakh ambassador in Moscow is the official representative of the Government in Astana to the Government of Russia.

== List of representatives ==
Diplomatic agrément/Diplomatic accreditation	ambassador	Russian language ru:Послы Казахстана в России	Kazakh language	Observations	Prime Minister of Kazakhstan	List of heads of government of Russia	Term end
January 1, 1994	Tair Mansurov	ru:Таир Мансуров	kk:Тайыр Аймұхамедұлы Мансұров		Akezhan Kazhegeldin	Boris Yeltsin	February 1, 2002
June 24, 1905	Altynbek Sarsenbayev	ru:Алтынбек Сарсенбайулы	kk:Алтынбек Сәрсенбайұлы	The second of these killings was that of Altynbek Sarsenbayev, the former ambassador to Russia and former minister of communication, who advocated democratic reforms and who unsuccessfully attempted to privatize the state's monopoly of	Imangali Tasmagambetov	Vladimir Putin	November 1, 2003
November 1, 2003	Krymbek Kusherbayev	ru:Крымбек Кушербаев	kk:Қырымбек Елеуұлы Көшербаев	KUSHERBAYEV Krymbek Ye. Kazakhstani diplomatist and politician; Akim (Governor) of Kyzylorda Oblast.	Daniyal Akhmetov	Vladimir Putin	January 24, 2006
February 1, 2006	Zhanseit Tuymenbayev	ru:Жансеит Туймебаев	kk:Жансейіт Қансейітұлы Түймебаев		Daniyal Akhmetov	Vladimir Putin	January 19, 2007
February 12, 2007	Nurtai Abykayev	ru:Нуртай Абыкаев	kk:Нұртай Әбіқайұлы Әбіқаев		Karim Massimov	Vladimir Putin	October 14, 2008
November 11, 2008	Adilbek Zhaksybekov	ru:Адильбек Джаксыбеков			Karim Massimov	Dmitry Medvedev	June 24, 2009
August 14, 2009	Zautbek Turisbekov	ru:Заутбек Турисбеков			Karim Massimov	Dmitry Medvedev	April 25, 2012
April 25, 2012	Galym Orazbakov	ru:Галым Оразбаков	kk:Ғалым Ізбасарұлы Оразбақов		Serik Akhmetov	Dmitry Medvedev	January 22, 2014
February 3, 2017	Marat Tazhin	ru:Марат Тажин	kk:Марат Мұханбетқазыұлы Тәжин		Serik Akhmetov	Dmitry Medvedev	
February 11, 2014	Imangali Tasmagambetov	ru:Тасмагамбетов, Имангали Нургалиевич	kk:Иманғали Нұрғалиұлы Тасмағамбетов		Bakhytzhan Sagintayev	Vladimir Putin	
