= List of Äkims of Aktobe Region =

This is the list of äkims of Aqtöbe Region that have held the position since 1992.

== List of Äkims ==
- Şalbai Qūlmahanov (11 February 1992 – 18 November 1993)
- Savely Pachin (18 November 1993 – 29 September 1995)
- Aslan Musin (29 September 1995 – 3 April 2002)
- Ermek İmantaev (3 April 2002 – 10 July 2004)
- Eleusın Sağyndyqov (10 July 2004 – 22 July 2011)
- Arhimed Mūhambetov (22 July 2011 – 11 September 2015)
- Berdıbek Saparbaev (11 September 2015 – 25 February 2019)
- Oñdasyn Orazalin (25 February 2019 – 31 August 2022)
- Eraly Togjanov (31 August 2022 - 5 September 2023)
- Ashat Şaharov (September 2023 - Present)
