= East Kazakhstan Regional Mäslihat =

Unicameral local legislature of the East Kazakhstan Region

East Kazakhstan Regional Mäslihat Шығыс Қазақстан облыстық мәслихаты

Type
- Type: Unicameral

History
- Founded: 10 December 1993

Leadership
- Secretary: Denis Rypakov, Nur Otan since 14 January 2021

Structure
- Seats: 38
- Political groups: Majority (32); Nur Otan (32); Opposition (6); Ak Zhol (3); Auyl (3)
- Length of term: 5 years

Elections
- Voting system: Party-list proportional representation Largest remainder method
- Last election: 10 January 2021
- Next election: 2026

Website
- maslihatvko.gov.kz

The East Kazakhstan Regional Mäslihat (Kazakh: Шығыс Қазақстан облыстық мәслихаты, romanized: Şyğys Qazaqstan oblystyq mäslihaty) is a unicameral local legislative body of the East Kazakhstan Region which convenes in Oskemen. It is composed of 38 members from three parties of Nur Otan (NO), Ak Zhol Democratic Party (AJ), and Auyl People's Democratic Patriotic Party (AUYL) whom are elected every five years through proportional representation. The current Mäslihat Secretary is Denis Rypakov (NO).

== History ==
On 10 December 1993, the Supreme Council of Kazakhstan approved the Law of the Republic of Kazakhstan "On local representative and executive bodies of the Republic of Kazakhstan", which introduced significant changes to the name and structure of state bodies, as well as drastic change in essence. On 7 March 1994, elections of members to the Mäslihats took place where in East Kazakhstan Regional Mäslihat–35 members were elected. The first session of the Mäslihat took place on 5 April 1994 where Pavel Elisov from the Mirolyubovsky 30th Constituency was unanimously elected as the Secretary of the Mäslihat.

In accordance with the Decree of the President of the Republic of Kazakhstan dated 3 May 1997 No. 3483 "On further measures to improve the administrative-territorial structure of the Republic of Kazakhstan", the borders of the East Kazakhstan Region were changed, which the territory included he abolished Semey Region. The Secretary of the Semey Regional Mäslihat was Hapas Dautov.

In the 2021 East Kazakhstan regional elections, 38 members were elected for the first time using newly implemented party-list proportional representation system where Nur Otan (NO) swept 32 seats while the Ak Zhol Democratic Party (AJ) and Auyl People's Democratic Patriotic Party (AUYL) bypassed the 7% electoral threshold and each won three seats. In the opening session of the 7th Regional Mäslihat Convocation held on 14 January 2021, Denis Rypakov (NO) was elected as the new Mäslihat Secretary, making him the first politician as a partisan to hold the position.

== Elections ==
Mäslihat members are generally up for re-election every 5 years and are elected on the basis of party-list proportional representation with a required 7% electoral threshold to win any seats in the legislature. If only one parties manages to bypass the electoral threshold, then the party win the second highest number of votes is granted enough seats for representation in the mäslihat regardless whether it had passed the threshold or not. A member of the mäslihat may be a citizen of Kazakhstan who has reached 20 years of age and can be a member of only one mäslihat.

== Powers and functions ==
In accordance with the Article 20 of the Constitution of Kazakhstan "On local government and self-government in the Republic of Kazakhstan"

- A member of a mäslihat expresses the will of the population of the corresponding administrative-territorial units, taking into account national interests.
- The powers of a member of a mäslihat begin from the moment of his registration as a deputy of a mäslihat by the relevant territorial election commission and terminate from the moment of termination of the powers of a mäslihat.
- The powers of a member of a mäslihat shall be terminated ahead of schedule in the following cases:
1. Election or appointment of a deputy to a position, the occupation of which, in accordance with the legislation of the Republic of Kazakhstan, is incompatible with the performance of deputy duties;
2. entry into legal force of a court decision on the recognition of a member incapacitated or partially incapacitated;
3. Termination of powers of mäslihat;
4. Death of a member by entry into force of a court declaration;
5. Termination of his citizenship of the Republic of Kazakhstan;
6. Entry into legal force of the court's conviction against the member;
7. Leaving for permanent residence outside the relevant administrative-territorial unit;
8. In connection with the personal resignation of the member;
9. Systematic failure of a member to fulfill his duties, including absence without good reason at plenary sessions of the mäslihat session or meetings of the mäslihat bodies to which he was elected, more than three times in a row;
- The decision on the early termination of the powers of a deputy is made at a session of the mäslihat by a majority of votes from the total number of present deputies upon the presentation of the relevant territorial election commission.
- Members of mäslihats who carry out their activities on a permanent or vacant basis, paid from the state budget, are not entitled to carry out entrepreneurial activities, independently participate in the management of an economic entity, engage in other paid activities, except for pedagogical, scientific or other creative.

== Secretary ==
The Secretary is an official who is accountable to the Mäslihat and exercises powers in accordance with the Law and regulations. The Mäslihat elects its Secretary in the first session by open or secret voting if the candidate receives a majority of votes. Candidates for the post of Secretary are nominated by members without limit. If more than two candidates are nominated and none reaches the required number of votes, a second vote is held for the two candidates who received the most votes. If, during the second vote, neither candidate receives more than half of the votes of the total number of deputies, a re-election is held.

=== List of secretaries ===
#	Name	Period
1	Pavel Elisov	5 April 1994 – 18 July 1996
2	Vasily Akhaev	18 July 1996 – 19 January 2012
3	Grigory Pinchuk	20 January 2012 – 7 October 2015
4	Vladimir Golovatyuk	7 October 2015 – 14 January 2021
5	Denis Rypakov	14 January 2021 –

== Current composition ==
The last election for the East Kazakhstan Regional Mäslihat was held on 10 January 2021.

Party	Seats
Nur Otan (NO)	32 / 38
Ak Zhol Democratic Party (AJ)	3 / 38
Auyl People's Democratic Patriotic Party (AUYL)	3 / 38

== See also ==
- Mäslihat
- 2021 East Kazakhstan regional election
