= Daniyal Akhmetov =

Former Prime Minister of Kazakhstan

- Даниал Ахметов
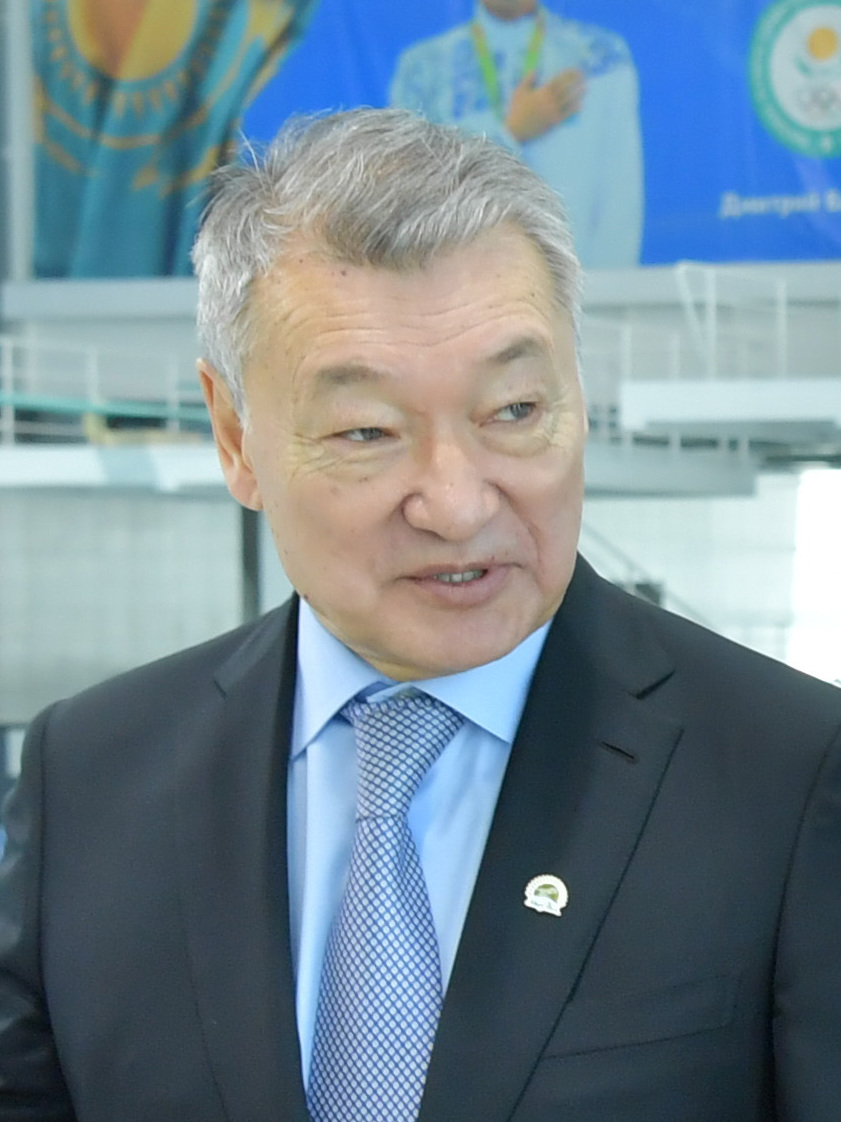
- Akhmetov in 2020

6th Prime Minister of Kazakhstan
- In office 13 June 2003 – 8 January 2007; Acting: 11 June 2003 – 13 June 2003
- President: Nursultan Nazarbayev
- First Deputy: Alexander Pavlov (2002–2004); Grigori Marchenko (2004)
- Preceded by: Imangali Tasmagambetov
- Succeeded by: Karim Massimov

First Deputy Prime Minister of Kazakhstan
- In office 21 December 2000 – 21 November 2001
- Prime Minister: Kassym-Jomart Tokayev
- Preceded by: Aleksandr Pavlov
- Succeeded by: Aleksandr Pavlov (2002)

Deputy Prime Minister of Kazakhstan
- In office 12 October 1999 – 21 December 2000
- Prime Minister: Kassym-Jomart Tokayev

Minister of Defense
- In office 10 January 2007 – 17 June 2009
- President: Nursultan Nazarbayev
- Prime Minister: Karim Massimov
- Preceded by: Mukhtar Altynbayev
- Succeeded by: Adilbek Zhaksybekov

Äkim of East Kazakhstan Region
- In office 11 November 2014 – 16 June 2023
- Preceded by: Berdibek Saparbayev
- Succeeded by: Ermek Köşerbaev

Äkim of Pavlodar Region
- In office 21 November 2001 – 11 June 2003
- Preceded by: Galymzhan Zhakiyanov
- Succeeded by: Qairat Nurpeisov
- In office 19 January 1993 – 19 December 1997
- Preceded by: Asygat Jabagin
- Succeeded by: Galymzhan Zhakiyanov

Äkim of North Kazakhstan Region
- In office 19 December 1997 – 12 October 1999
- Preceded by: Vladimir Gartman
- Succeeded by: Qajymurat Nagymanov

Personal details
- Born: 15 June 1954 (age 72) Pavlodar, Kazakh SSR, Soviet Union
- Party: Amanat

Danial Kenjetaiūly Ahmetov (often transliterated as Daniyal Akhmetov, Kazakh: Даниал Кенжетайұлы Ахметов, [dɑnɯˈjɑɫ kʲenʐʲeˈtʰɑjo̙ˈɫɯ axˈmʲetʰɘf]; born 15 June 1954) is a Kazakh politician who was the 6th Prime Minister of Kazakhstan from 13 June 2003 to 9 January 2007.

Critics refer to him as "The Terminator", a nickname he gained as the akim of Pavlodar Region for his actions in suppressing supporters of Galymzhan Zhakiyanov, the previous äkim. On 8 January 2007, he resigned as Prime Minister. He did not say why, but President Nursultan Nazarbayev had criticized him in 2006 for overspending and other administrative errors. Nazarbayev accepted his resignation, and immediately appointed him acting Prime Minister.

Akhmetov was included as Minister of Defense in the government that took office on 10 January 2007. He was dismissed from that post in June 2009. From 11 November 2014 to 16 June 2023, he was äkim of the East Kazakhstan Region.

== Early life and career ==
Akhmetov was born in the city of Pavlodar in the Kazakh SSR. In 1976, he graduated from the Pavlodar State University with a degree in civil engineering.

After graduating, Akhmetov began his career as a foreman, then worked as a foreman at the housebuilding plant of the Pavlodarzhilstroy trust. In 1981, he became the deputy chief engineer at the construction site of the Ekibastuzshakhtastroy Combine. From 1983, he served as a deputy chairman of the executive committee of the Ekibastuz City Council of People's Deputies. In 1991, Akhmetov became the manager of the EkibastuzEnergoZhilPromStroy trust.

== Early political career ==
From 1992, Akhmetov was head of the Ekibastuz City Administration and on 19 January 1993, he was appointed as the äkim of Pavlodar Region. He served that position before becoming the äkim of North Kazakhstan Region on 19 December 1997.

On 12 October 1999, Akhmetov was appointed as the Deputy Prime Minister of Kazakhstan under Tokayev's cabinet and from 21 December 2000, he served as the First Deputy Prime Minister. There, Akhmetov was in charge of industry, agriculture, transport and communications, migration and demographic policy. He was reappointed again as the äkim of Pavlodar region on 21 November 2001 after his predecessor Galymzhan Zhakiyanov was dismissed after joining the opposition by helping to form the Democratic Choice of Kazakhstan.

== Prime Minister of Kazakhstan (2003–2006) ==
=== Appointment ===
President Nursultan Nazarbayev nominated Akhmetov as Prime Minister at a joint session of parliament on 13 June 2003. Nazarbayev gave a speech saying the PM needed to have experience in provincial government because the nation needed to speed up the pace of social and economic development. Akmetov was approved by 36 of 39 senators and 73 of 77 members of the Majilis to form the 28th government of Kazakhstan.

Akhmetov told the parliament he wanted continuity in policy despite the change in government, and said that Kazakhstan is "building a state governed by the rule of law where everyone has the right to freedom of conscience and expression, but that everyone should work within the law." He said there should not be dissidence, only constructive dialogue and mutual understanding, and called for everyone to engage in presidential economic programs.

=== Petroleum law changes ===
Akhmetov worked to change Kazakhstan's petroleum laws despite strong opposition from foreign companies. In May 2004, he received a letter from 47 foreign oil companies, including ChevronTexaco, ExxonMobil, Shell, the BG Group, and ENI, complaining that the proposed changes would negatively affect future investment. The companies specifically took issue with local content requirements, which were described as "unnecessarily burdensome" and that a requirement for KMG to own at least 50% of any development "may not be advisable in all circumstances."

=== Kazakhstan-South Korea relations ===
Akhmetov met with South Korean Prime Minister Han Myeong Sook on 23 September 2006 in Astana and signed several bilateral agreements enhancing economic ties. The Government of South Korea agreed to invest an additional $2 billion in joint projects in the energy, uranium-extraction, construction, transportation, and banking sectors. Akhmetov offered South Korea the option of participating in developing a new type of nuclear reactor. South Korean investors have stakes in more than 300 Kazakhstan-based companies. Han invited Nazarbayev to visit South Korea in 2007. Han was in Kazakhstan until 24 September. She then traveled to Uzbekistan.

=== Kazakhstan-Tatarstan relations ===
Akhmetov met with Rustam Minnikhanov, the Prime Minister of the Autonomous Republic of Tatarstan, in Astana on 13 October 2006. They discussed creating a joint venture that would build helicopters, Kazakh government investment in petrochemical businesses in Tatarstan, and constructing a highway to western China that would connect St. Petersburg to Moscow, Kazan, Orenburg, Kyzylorda, Shymkent, and Korgas in Xinjiang, China. Akhmetov called the proposed highway "the shortest road link between Europe and China". Iskender Muflikhanov, aide to Prime Minister Minnikhanov, said the Tatar government had "great hopes with regard to the shipping, or the assembling [in Kazakhstan] of KamAZ trucks. Work in under way on this West-South highway project in Kazakhstan and, as a rule, our KamAZ trucks are irreplaceable for projects of that magnitude."

=== 2007 political shakeup ===
Nazarbayev nominated Karim Massimov, who at the time served as Deputy PM, to succeed Akhmetov as PM on 9 January 2007. Akhmetov resigned on 8 January without explanation. Analysts attributed Akhmetov's political downfall to the President's criticism of his administrative oversight of the economy. The Parliament confirmed the nomination on 10 January. Akhmetov was appointed as Defense Minister, replacing Mukhtar Altynbayev.

== Post-Premiership ==
Akhmetov continued to serve as the Defense Minister under Massimov's government until being relieved from his post on 17 June 2009. In December 2010, it was revealed that Akhmetov headed a company in the field of ecological energy and did not want to return to politics, KazTAG reported. According to the agency, Akhmetov was pleased with such changes in his life, since he began to spend more time with his family and friends. He also led a healthy lifestyle and was engaged in cycling. Akhmetov also denied rumors that he allegedly wanted to shoot himself after resignation.

On 21 December 2011, he was appointed a member of the Board for Energy and Infrastructure of the Eurasian Economic Commission.

From 11 November 2014 to 16 June 2023, he was äkim of the East Kazakhstan Region.

Political offices
Preceded by Berdibek Saparbayev	Akim of East Kazakhstan Region; 2014–2023	Succeeded by Ermek Köşerbaev
Preceded by Imangali Tasmagambetov	Prime Minister of Kazakhstan; 2003-2007	Succeeded by Karim Massimov
