= QazCovid-in =

Vaccine candidate against COVID-19

Vaccine description
- Target: SARS-CoV-2
- Vaccine type: Inactivated

Clinical data
- Routes of administration: Intramuscular

Identifiers
- CAS Number: 2541708-50-1; QazCoVac-P: 2699021-46-8
- DrugBank: DB16441

QazCovid-in, commercially known as QazVac, is a COVID-19 vaccine developed by the Research Institute for Biological Safety Problems in Kazakhstan. QazCoVac-P was the second COVID-19 vaccine developed by the Kazakh Biosafety Research Institute and in clinical trials.

== Manufacturing ==
The vaccine can be stored at standard refrigeration temperatures (2 °C-8 °C) and is a two-dose régime with the doses administered twenty-one days apart. The vaccine was first manufactured by Kazakhstan's Research Institute of Biological Safety Problems. Production capacity was capped at 50,000 doses per month.

The vaccine was slated to be packaged in bulk and be bottled in Turkey by a Turkish company beginning in June 2021. It was intended for a production capacity of 500,000-600,000 doses per month. The contract was still being negotiated as of April 2021, despite earlier claims suggesting that the deal had already been finalized.

In October 2021, it was announced that the vaccine would be supplied to Afghanistan and other countries in 2022.

== History ==
=== Clinical trials ===
In September 2020, QazVac started in Phase I/II clinical trials.

In December 2020, QazVac was in Phase III clinical trials, which was expected to be fully completed by 9 July 2021. It is unclear when the first preliminary results will be published.

The administration of the vaccine for the general population began at the end of April 2021. The Research Institute Kunsulu Zakarya's Director General's justification is that the trial is almost 50% completed and "people who have received [the] vaccine feel well; there have been no side-effects and the effectiveness of the vaccine is high".

In September 2021, a study was published to eClinicalMedicine, published by The Lancet. The study's findings were that the "QazCovid-in® vaccine was safe and well-tolerated and induced predominantly mild adverse events; no serious or severe adverse events were recorded in both trials."

In December 2025, a study was conducted by West Kazakhstan Marat Ospanov Medical University lead researcher, Kairat B. Kurmangaliyev.

== Economics ==
The first batch of 50,000 doses was delivered on 26 April 2021, and vaccination began shortly after. In June 2021, the capacity was intended increase to 100,000 doses per month, regardless of the contract for bottling in Turkey.
