= Eraly Togjanov =

Kazakh politician

- Ералы Тоғжанов
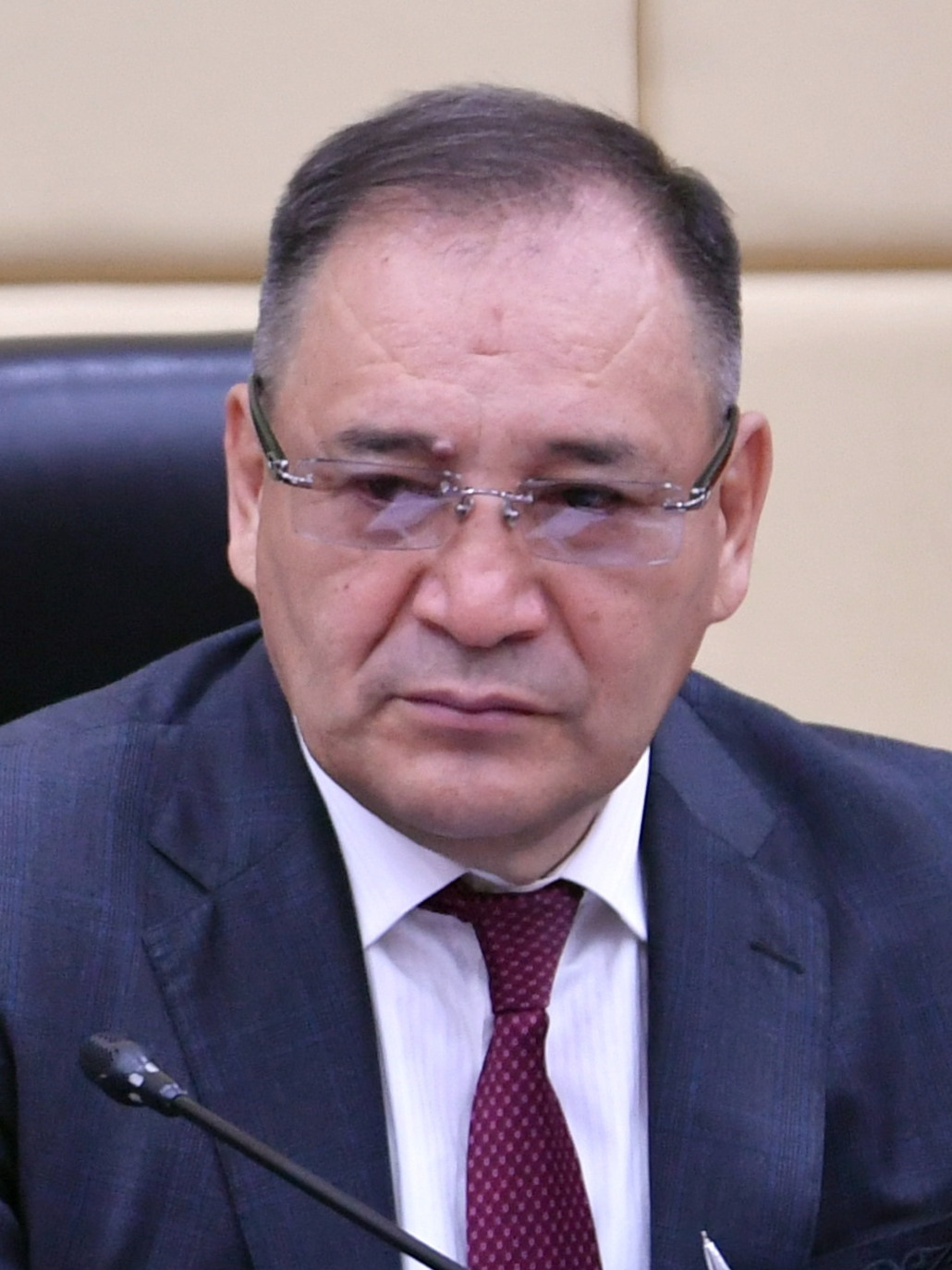
- Togjanov in 2024

Kazakh ambassador to Uzbekistan
- Incumbent
- Assumed office 22 July 2026
- President: Kassym-Jomart Tokayev
- Preceded by: Beibut Atamkulov

Äkim of Aktobe Region
- In office 31 August 2022 – 5 September 2023
- President: Kassym-Jomart Tokayev
- Preceded by: Ondasyn Orazalin
- Succeeded by: Ashat Şaharov

Deputy Prime Minister of Kazakhstan
- In office 11 February 2020 – 31 August 2022
- Prime Minister: Askar Mamin

Chairman of the Federation of Trade Unions
- In office 16 September 2019 – 11 February 2020
- Preceded by: Baqytjan Abdiraiym
- Succeeded by: Satybaldy Dauletalin

Äkim of Mangystau Region
- In office 14 March 2017 – 13 June 2019
- President: Nursultan Nazarbayev; Kassym-Jomart Tokayev
- Preceded by: Alik Aidarbaev
- Succeeded by: Serikbai Turymov

Personal details
- Born: 13 May 1963 (age 63) Shagatai, Kazakh SSR, Soviet Union (now Kazakhstan)
- Spouse: Gülnar Togjanova
- Children: 4
- Education: Karagandy State University; Kazakhstan Academy of Sciences

Eraly Lūqpanūly Toğjanov (Note: Often transliterated as Tugzhanov through the Russified Romanization of Russian: Ералы Лукпанович Тугжанов) (Kazakh: Ералы Лұқпанұлы Тоғжанов; born 13 May 1963) is a Kazakh politician, who's currently serving as ambassador to Uzbekistan since 2026.

Previously, Togjanov served as the controversial Äkim of Aktobe Region from August 2022 to September 2023, Deputy Prime Minister of Kazakhstan from 2020 to 2022, Äkim of Mangystau Region from 2017 to 2019 and Chairman of the Federation of Trade Unions of Kazakhstan from 2019 to 2020.

Known as a "representative" of the "Old Kazakhstan", Togjanov is one of the most controversial veteran politicians of the country. He is especially known for insisting not to answer when asked on his salary in 2022, his 2023 controversial interview with Ashat Niyazov and his fellow politician and younger brother, who swore at his employees.

== Biography ==
=== Early life and education ===
Born in the village of Shagatai, Togjanov graduated in 1988 from Karagandy State University, majoring in law. In 1994 he graduated from the Kazakhstan Academy of Sciences.

=== Career ===
He began his career in 1980 as a worker in the Octyabrsky Forestry of the Ural Region.

From 1988 to 1991, Togjanov was a lecturer in the Department of Theory and History of State and Law at the Karaganda State University. In 1994, he became a senior lecturer and the deputy dean at the Faculty of Public Administration and International Law of the Kazakh Humanitarian Law University. In 1997 Togjanov became its dean. From 1999 to 2001, he was the director of the branch, then the Institute of Rights and Public Service in the university.

In 2001, Togjanov became the deputy akim of Karaganda Region. From 2006 to 2008, he served as the chairman of the Council for Religious Affairs of the Ministry of Justice of Kazakhstan. From 2008 to 2017, Togjanov was the deputy chairman and the administrative secretary of the Assembly of People of Kazakhstan in the Presidential Administration of Kazakhstan.

On 14 March 2017, Togjanov was appointed as the akim of the Mangystau Region until he was dismissed on 13 June 2019. From 16 September 2019 to 11 February 2020, Togjanov served as the chairman of the Federation of Trade Unions of Kazakhstan.

On 11 February 2020, he was appointed as the Deputy Prime Minister of Kazakhstan. While serving as Deputy Prime Minister, Togjanov had tested positive for COVID-19 on 19 June 2020. In response, he went into self-isolation. On 1 July 2020, it was reported that Togjanov had recovered from the virus.

From August 2022 to September 2023 he was the akim of Aktobe region.

In May 2024, he returned to politics by being appointed Advisor to the Prime Minister. Some media named this the "return of Old Kazakhstan" (as opposed to Tokayev's New Kazakhstan terminology).

== Controversies ==
=== Interview with Ashat Niyazov ===
On July 23, 2023, the Äkim of Aktobe Region Togjanov's interview with journalist Ashat Niyazov, the founder of the "Obojayu" (Russian: Обожаю, lit. 'Love it') YouTube channel, demanded that the journalist speak Kazakh instead of actually answering Niyazov's questions, and kept changing the topic to the language issue of the country. For this behavior, the mayor was severely criticized both on social and mass media.

== Personal life ==
Eraly Togjanov has a younger brother, Marat Togjanov, who is also engaged in politics. In November 2022, as Äkim of Bayterek District, he was recorded speaking rudely to his employees; in the 1-hour, 20-minute recorded audio, he used more than 140 profanities.

Eraly Togjanov is married. His wife is Gülnar Sapargalievna Togjanova (born 1968). His daughters are: Ayajan (born 1989), Aiganym (born 1991), Bakyttygul (born 1994) and Minura (born 2008).
