= Berdibek Saparbayev =

Kazakhstani politician (1953–2023)

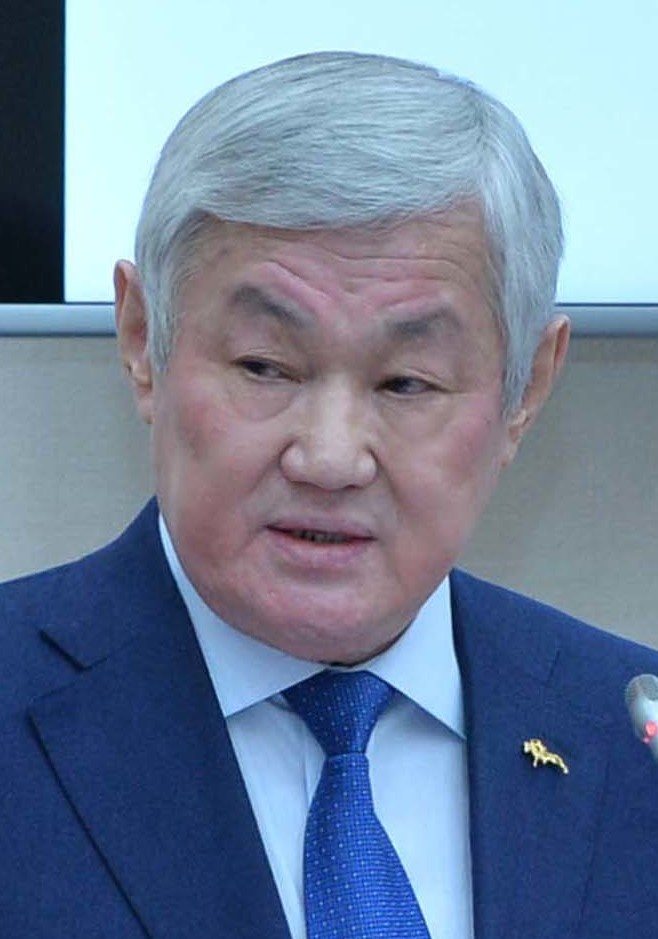
- Saparbayev in 2020

Deputy Prime Minister of Kazakhstan
- In office 20 August 2019 – 10 February 2020
- Prime Minister: Askar Mamin
- In office 11 November 2014 – 11 September 2015
- Prime Minister: Karim Massimov

Minister of Labour and Social Protection of the Population
- In office 25 February 2019 – 20 August 2019
- President: Kassym-Jomart Tokayev; Nursultan Nazarbayev
- Prime Minister: Askar Mamin
- Preceded by: Madina Abilqasymova
- Succeeded by: Birjan Nurymbetov
- In office 27 August 2007 – 4 March 2009
- President: Nursultan Nazarbayev
- Prime Minister: Karim Massimov
- Preceded by: Gulzhan Karagusova
- Succeeded by: Gulshara Abdykhalikova

Äkim of Jambyl Region
- In office 10 February 2020 – 7 April 2022
- Preceded by: Askar Myrzakhmetov

Äkim of Aktobe Region
- In office 11 September 2015 – 25 February 2019
- Preceded by: Arhimed Muhambetov
- Succeeded by: Ondasyn Urazalin

Äkim of East Kazakhstan Region
- In office 4 March 2009 – 11 November 2014
- Preceded by: Adylgazy Bergenev
- Succeeded by: Daniyal Akhmetov

Äkim of South Kazakhstan Region
- In office 26 July 1999 – 30 August 2002
- Preceded by: Qalyq Abdullaev
- Succeeded by: Bolat Jylkyshiev

Äkim of Kyzylorda Region
- In office 29 September 1995 – 26 July 1999
- Preceded by: Seyilbek Shauhamanov
- Succeeded by: Serikbai Nurgisaev

Personal details
- Born: Berdibek Mashbekuly Saparbayev; 9 February 1953 Besaryq, Kazakh SSR, USSR
- Died: 10 June 2023 (aged 70)
- Party: Nur Otan
- Spouse: Qaldygaisha Saparabayeva
- Children: 3

Berdibek Mashbekuly Saparbayev (Kazakh: Бердiбек Машбекұлы Сапарбаев, Berdıbek Maşbekūly Saparbaev; 9 February 1953 – 10 June 2023) was a Kazakh politician who was the Minister of Labor and Social Protection of Population in the Government of Kazakhstan from 2005 to 2007 and in 2019, governor of Aktobe Region, Deputy Prime Minister from 2019 to 2020. From 10 February 2020 to 7 April 2022, he was the akim of Zhambyl region.

== Early life and education ==
Saparbayev began his career in 1969 as a worker in the Zadarinsky State Farm. From 1971 to 1973 he served in the army. In 1977 he graduated from the Alma-Ata Institute of National Economy with a degree in economics. After graduation, he worked as an economist at the Republican Administration of Gostrudsberkass.

== Political career ==
In the period from 1977 to 1988, Saparbayev worked in the Ministry of Finance of the Kazakh SSR. First, an economist, then a senior economist, leading, chief economist, and deputy head of department.

From 1988 to 1994, he was the Head of Planning and Finance Department, Head of GlavPEU, Deputy Minister of Education of Kazakhstan. For about a year, Saparbayev held the post of deputy head of department of the Office of the President and the Cabinet of Ministers of Kazakhstan. From 1994 to 1995 – Deputy Head, then Head of the Department of Finance, Labor and Social Protection of the Office of the Cabinet of Ministers of the Republic of Kazakhstan. From March to September 1995, he served as the Head of the Office of the Cabinet of Ministers of Kazakhstan.

From July 1999 to August 2002, Saparbayev served as the akim of the South Kazakhstan Region.

In 2002, he became the Chairman of the Customs Control Agency of Kazakhstan, then Vice-Minister of Finance – Chairman of the Customs Control Committee of the Ministry of Finance of Kazakhstan.

From 2006 to 2007, Saparbayev was the Deputy Head of the Office of the Prime Minister – Representative of the Government in the Parliament of Kazakhstan.

From February to August 2007, he served as the Vice Minister of Economics and Budget Planning of Kazakhstan.

In August 2007, he was appointed the Minister of Labor and Social Protection of the Population.

From 4 March 2009 to 11 November 2014, Saparbayev served as the akim of the East Kazakhstan Region.

On 11 November 2014, he was appointed Deputy Prime Minister of Kazakhstan.

On 11 September 2015, Saparbayev became the akim of the Aktobe Region.

On 26 February 2019, was appointed to the post of Minister of Labor and Social Protection of the Republic of Kazakhstan.

From 20 August 2019 to 10 February 2020, Saparbayev served as the Deputy Prime Minister of Kazakhstan.

From 10 February 2020 to 7 April 2022 he held the position of akim of Zhambyl region.

== Other positions ==
On 27 August 2022 Saparbayev Berdybek Mashbekovich was elected Chairman of the Board of Directors of QazBioPharm Holding.

== Death ==
Saparbayev died on 10 June 2023, at the age of 70.

== Awards ==
- Order of Kurmet (1999)
- Order of Parasat (2007)
- Order of Otan (2017)
