= Fourth Massimov Government =

Government of Kazakhstan

- 13th Cabinet of Kazakhstan
- 2015–2016
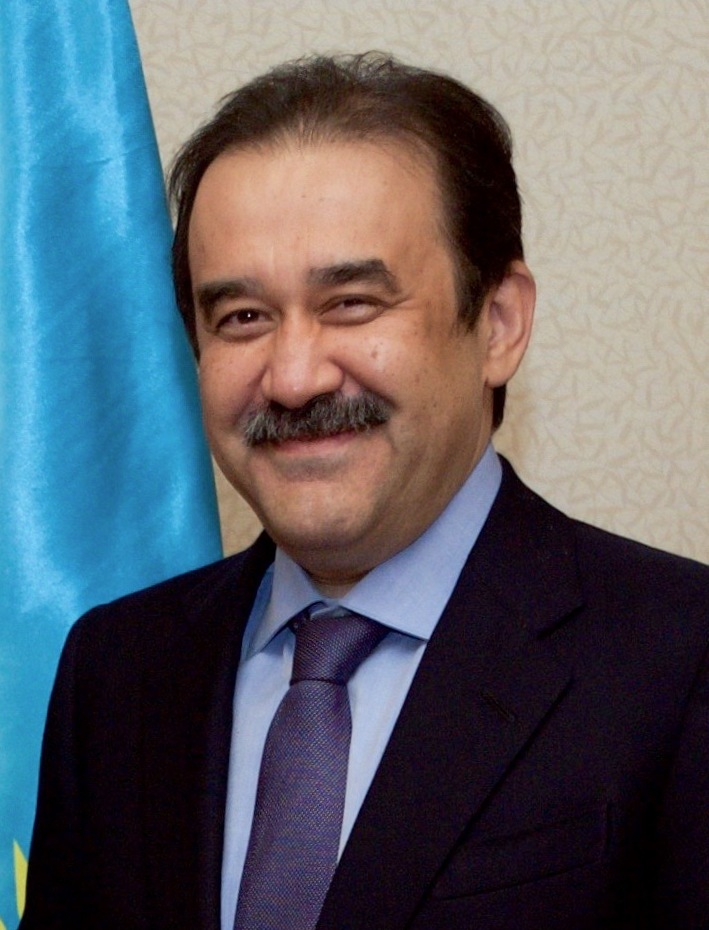
- Date formed: 29 April 2015
- Date dissolved: 9 September 2016

People and organisations
- Head of state: Nursultan Nazarbayev
- Head of government: Karim Massimov; Bakhytzhan Sagintayev (acting)
- Deputy head of government: Bakhytzhan Sagintayev
- Member party: Nur Otan
- Status in legislature: Supermajority

History
- Predecessor: Massimov III
- Successor: Sagintayev

The Fourth Massimov Government (Kazakh: Мәсімов төртінші үкіметі, romanized: Mäsımov törtınşı ükımetı; Russian: Четвёртое правительство Масимова) was the 10th composition under the Government of Kazakhstan, headed by Prime Minister Karim Massimov. It was formed on 29 April 2015, following the re-election of President Nursultan Nazarbayev in the 2015 presidential election. After briefly resigning, as per constitution, Massimov under parliamentary approval was reappointed by President Nazarbayev on the same day, to continue his role as prime minister.

The newly formed government was swiftly approved by the Parliament on 30 April 2015. Many ministers from the previous cabinet retained their positions, while new appointments were made in key ministries, reflecting the administration's goal of ensuring economic stability amidst ongoing economic stagnation.

The government continued its tenure until 8 September 2016, when President Nazarbayev appointed Massimov as the head of the National Security Committee, marking the end of Massimov's fourth term as prime minister. His first deputy, Bakhytzhan Sagintayev, succeeded him as the head of the government after being confirmed by Parliament the following day.

== Composition ==
Functions	Holder	Start	End
Prime Minister	Karim Massimov	2 April 2014	8 September 2016
Prime Minister	Bakhytzhan Sagintayev (acting)	8 September 2016	9 September 2016
First Deputy Prime Minister	Bakhytzhan Sagintayev	16 January 2013	8 September 2016
Deputy Prime Minister	Bakhyt Sultanov	6 November 2013	11 November 2018
Deputy Prime Minister	Gulshara Abdykhalikova	28 November 2013	11 November 2014
Deputy Prime Minister	Berdibek Saparbayev	11 November 2014	11 September 2015
Deputy Prime Minister	Dariga Nazarbayeva	11 September 2015	13 September 2016
Deputy Prime Minister	Askar Myrzakhmetov	14 June 2016	15 December 2017
Prime Minister's Office	Erlan Qoşanov	2 January 2012	27 March 2017
Ministry of Foreign Affairs	Erlan Idrissov	28 September 2012	28 December 2016
Ministry of Defense	Serik Akhmetov	3 April 2014	22 October 2014
Ministry of Defense	Imangali Tasmagambetov	22 October 2014	12 September 2016
Ministry of Emergency Situations	Vladimir Bozhko	13 November 2007	6 August 2014
Ministry of Internal Affairs	Kalmukhambet Kassymov	11 April 2011	12 February 2019
Ministry of Civil Service	Talgat Donakov	29 December 2015	13 September 2016
Ministry of Information and Communications	Dauren Abaev	6 May 2016	25 February 2019
Ministry of Agriculture	Asyljan Mamytbekov	11 April 2011	6 May 2016
Ministry of Agriculture	Askar Myrzakhmetov	6 May 2016	15 December 2017
Ministry of Justice	Berik Imashev	20 January 2012	13 September 2016
Ministry of Education and Science	Aslan Särınjıpov	2 September 2013	10 February 2016
Ministry of Education and Science	Erlan Sağadiev	10 February 2016	25 February 2019
Ministry of Healthcare	Salidat Qaiyrbekova	7 October 2010	6 August 2014
Ministry of Labour and Social Protection of the Population	Tamara Duisenova	27 June 2013	6 August 2014
Ministry of Healthcare and Social Development	Tamara Duisenova	6 August 2014	25 January 2017
Ministry of Transport and Communications	Zhenis Kassymbek	7 March 2014	6 August 2014
Ministry of Industry and New Technologies	Asset Issekeshev	12 March 2010	6 August 2014
Ministry of Investment and Development	Asset Issekeshev	6 August 2014	21 June 2016
Ministry of Investment and Development	Zhenis Kassymbek	21 June 2016	25 February 2019
Ministry of Culture	Arystanbek Muhamediuly	11 March 2014	6 August 2014
Ministry of Culture and Sports	Arystanbek Muhamediuly	6 August 2014	17 June 2019
Ministry of Economic Integration	Zhanar Aitzhanova	16 April 2011	11 May 2016
Ministry of Finance	Bakhyt Sultanov	6 November 2013	11 November 2018
Ministry of Economy and Budget Planning	Erbolat Dosaev	16 January 2013	6 August 2014
Ministry of National Economy	Erbolat Dosaev	6 August 2014	5 May 2016
Ministry of National Economy	Kuandyk Bishimbayev	6 May 2016	28 December 2016
Ministry of Environment and Water	Nurlan Kapparov	4 April 2014	6 August 2014
Ministry of Oil and Gas	Uzakbay Karabalin	3 July 2013	4 August 2014
Ministry of Energy	Vladimir Shkolnik	6 August 2014	25 March 2016
Ministry of Energy	Kanat Bozumbayev	25 March 2016	18 December 2019
