= Third Massimov Government =

Government of Kazakhstan

- 12th Cabinet of Kazakhstan
- 2014–2015
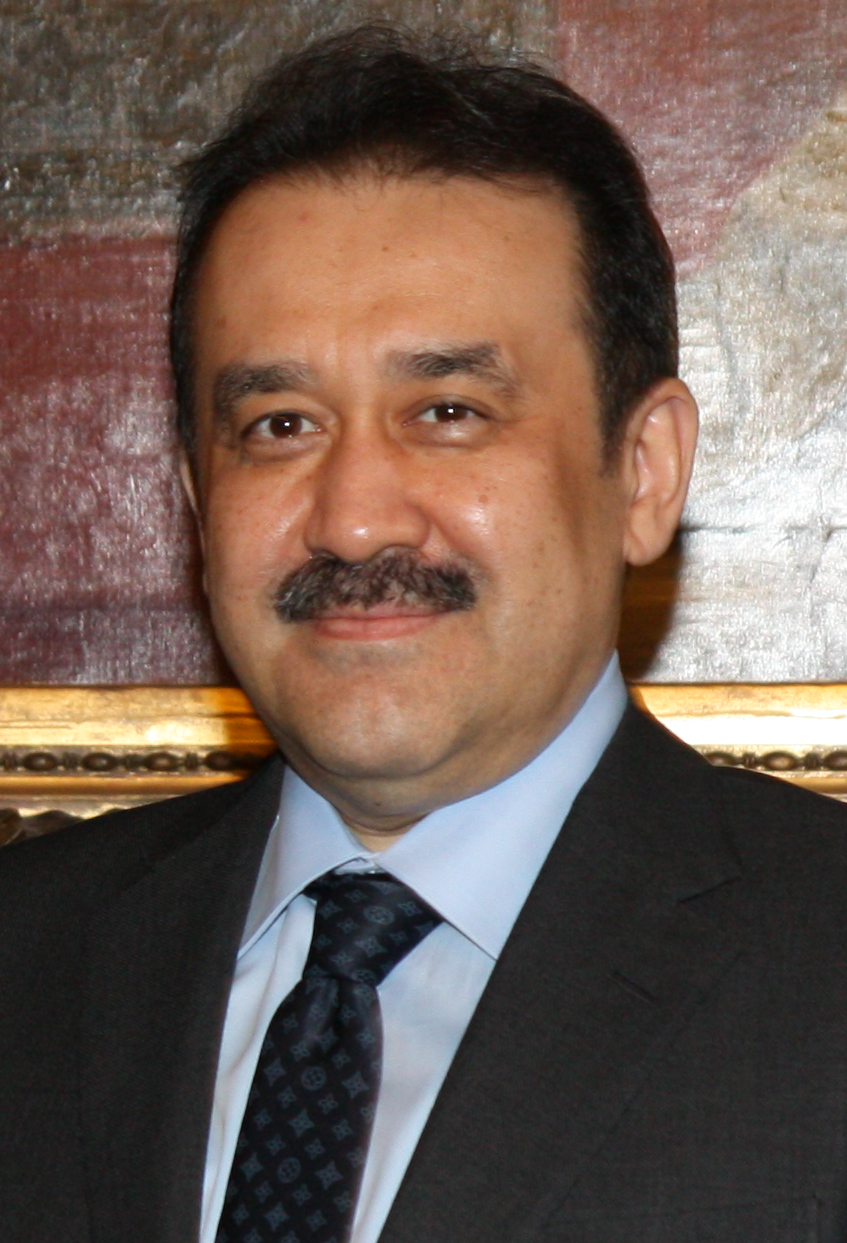
- Date formed: 2 April 2014
- Date dissolved: 29 April 2015

People and organisations
- Head of state: Nursultan Nazarbayev
- Head of government: Karim Massimov; Bakhytzhan Sagintayev (acting)
- Deputy head of government: Bakhytzhan Sagintayev
- Member party: Nur Otan
- Status in legislature: Supermajority

History
- Predecessor: Akhmetov
- Successor: Massimov IV

The Third Massimov Government (Kazakh: Мәсімов үшінші үкіметі, romanized: Mäsımov üşinşi ükımetı; Russian: Третье правительство Масимова) was the 12th composition under the Government of Kazakhstan and was led by Prime Minister Karim Massimov. It was formed on 2 April 2014 after Prime Minister Serik Akhmetov resigned from office just weeks after the devaluation of Kazakhstan's currency, the tenge, which caused inflation and led to protests in several cities. As a result, President Nursultan Nazarbayev reappointed Massimov, who was quickly approved by the Parliament due to his prior record of promoting business-friendly policies during his premiership from 2007 to 2012.

The cabinet continued until the 2015 presidential election, after which Massimov briefly resigned. However, on the same day, 29 April 2015, he was reappointed by President Nazarbayev as prime minister, continuing to lead the government in his fourth cabinet.

== Composition ==
Functions	Holder	Start	End
Prime Minister	Karim Massimov	29 April 2015	8 September 2016
First Deputy Prime Minister	Bakhytzhan Sagintayev	16 January 2013	8 September 2016
Deputy Prime Minister	Bakhyt Sultanov	6 November 2013	11 November 2018
Deputy Prime Minister	Gulshara Abdykhalikova	28 November 2013	11 November 2014
Deputy Prime Minister	Berdibek Saparbayev	11 November 2014	11 September 2015
Prime Minister's Office	Erlan Qoşanov	2 January 2012	27 March 2017
Ministry of Foreign Affairs	Erlan Idrissov	28 September 2012	28 December 2016
Ministry of Defense	Serik Akhmetov	3 April 2014	22 October 2014
Ministry of Defense	Imangali Tasmagambetov	22 October 2014	12 September 2016
Ministry of Emergency Situations	Vladimir Bozhko	13 November 2007	6 August 2014
Ministry of Internal Affairs	Kalmukhambet Kassymov	11 April 2011	12 February 2019
Ministry of Agriculture	Asyljan Mamytbekov	11 April 2011	6 May 2016
Ministry of Justice	Berik Imashev	20 January 2012	13 September 2016
Ministry of Education and Science	Aslan Särınjıpov	2 September 2013	10 February 2016
Ministry of Healthcare	Salidat Qaiyrbekova	7 October 2010	6 August 2014
Ministry of Labour and Social Protection of the Population	Tamara Duisenova	27 June 2013	6 August 2014
Ministry of Healthcare and Social Development	Tamara Duisenova	6 August 2014	25 January 2017
Ministry of Transport and Communications	Zhenis Kassymbek	7 March 2014	6 August 2014
Ministry of Industry and New Technologies	Asset Issekeshev	12 March 2010	6 August 2014
Ministry of Investment and Development	Asset Issekeshev	6 August 2014	21 June 2016
Ministry of Culture	Arystanbek Muhamediuly	11 March 2014	6 August 2014
Ministry of Culture and Sports	Arystanbek Muhamediuly	6 August 2014	17 June 2019
Ministry of Economic Integration	Zhanar Aitzhanova	16 April 2011	11 May 2016
Ministry of Finance	Bakhyt Sultanov	6 November 2013	11 November 2018
Ministry of Economy and Budget Planning	Erbolat Dosaev	16 January 2013	6 August 2014
Ministry of National Economy	Erbolat Dosaev	6 August 2014	5 May 2016
Ministry of National Economy	Kuandyk Bishimbayev	6 May 2016	28 December 2016
Ministry of Environment and Water	Nurlan Kapparov	4 April 2014	6 August 2014
Ministry of Oil and Gas	Uzakbay Karabalin	3 July 2013	4 August 2014
Ministry of Energy	Vladimir Shkolnik	6 August 2014	25 March 2016
