= Kazakh anti-LGBTQ law =

2025 legislation in Kazakhstan

Anti-LGBTQ law in Kazakhstan
- Emblem of Kazakhstan

Parliament of Kazakhstan
- Long title: On Introducing Changes and Additions to Some Legislative Acts of the Republic of Kazakhstan on Matters of Archival Affairs and Restrictions on the Distribution of Illegal Content
- Citation: No. 248-VIII
- Considered by: Parliament of Kazakhstan
- Passed by: Mäjilis
- Passed: 12 November 2025
- Passed by: Senate
- Passed: 18 December 2025
- Signed by: Kassym-Jomart Tokayev
- Signed: 30 December 2025
- Commenced: 1 January 2026

Legislative history

Initiating chamber: Mäjilis
- Bill citation: No. 858-VIII
- First reading: 17 September 2025
- Second reading: 12 November 2025

Revising chamber: Senate
- Bill citation: No. 566-VIII
- First reading: 18 December 2025
- Second reading: 18 December 2025
- Status: In force

The anti-LGBTQ law in Kazakhstan, formally On Introducing Changes and Additions to Some Legislative Acts of the Republic of Kazakhstan on Matters of Archival Affairs and Restrictions on the Distribution of Illegal Content, (Note: Kazakh: Қазақстан Республикасының кейбір заңнамалық актілеріне архив ісі және құқыққа қайшы контенттің таралуын шектеу мәселелері бойынша өзгерістер мен толықтырулар енгізу туралы; Russian: О внесении изменений и дополнений в некоторые законодательные акты Республики Казахстан по вопросам архивного дела и ограничения распространения противоправного контента) is a law in Kazakhstan adopted in 2025 that restricts the public dissemination of information defined as promoting "non-traditional sexual orientation" through media, telecommunications, online platforms and public spaces in Kazakhstan.

The bill was introduced in October 2025 by a group of 15 deputies of the Mäjilis representing multiple political parties. It proposed new restrictions on certain forms of public expression and media content and received official endorsements from the Ministries of Culture and Information, Internal Affairs, Health, and Education, as well as from the Cabinet of Ministers.

Several domestic and international human rights organizations urged Parliament to reject the proposal during its consideration, citing concerns over potential media censorship and risks to LGBTQ+ individuals in Kazakhstan. The legislation has frequently been compared to similar laws adopted in Russia, with some commentators suggesting it was influenced by or modeled on that framework.

The bill passed its second reading in the Mäjilis on 12 November 2025 and was approved by the Senate on 18 December 2025. President Kassym-Jomart Tokayev signed the law on 30 December 2025. While the legislation does not criminalize same-sex relationships, it limits public expression and representation related to LGBTQ+ topics.

== Background ==
Kazakhstan has legalised homosexual relations in the 1990s, after the dissolution of the Soviet Union; however, as reported by Reuters, the majority-Muslim secular country remains socially conservative.

President of Kazakhstan Kassym-Jomart Tokayev has voiced homophobic statements earlier in 2025 by stating: "For decades, so-called democratic moral values, including LGBT, were imposed on many countries".

In April 2024, several deputies of the Mäjilis proposed amendments to the Law "On Mass Media" that would have banned so-called "LGBT propaganda" and introduced criminal liability by equating such content with the incitement of social, national, tribal, racial, class, or religious hatred. However, these provisions were excluded from the final draft, as Vice Minister of Culture and Information Qanat Ysqaqov stated that neither criminal nor administrative liability related to such content was included and that the authorized body did not support the proposal.

In June 2024, a petition calling for legislation to ban "LGBT propaganda" was opened in Kazakhstan and reached the required 50,000 signatures, becoming the third petition on the issue to do so. United Nations experts issued a joint statement opposing the petition, warning that such measures would violate multiple human rights. In August 2024, the Ministry of Culture and Information partially approved the petition, noting it complies with the provisions of the Constitution, the requirements of international and national regulatory legal documents, key priorities of state policy reflected in the concept of family and gender policy.

== History ==
On 28 October 2025, 15 deputies proposed the legislation. The next day, the Parliament held talks regarding it alongside the Ministry of Culture and Information. Later that day, the Parliament gave preliminary approval to the draft law, putting it up for consideration and a future vote.

On 12 November 2025, the Mäjilis passed the draft law at its second reading. During parliamentary debate, several deputies defended the bill as a response to public demand and rejected criticism from human rights organizations. Nikita Shatalov stated that public concern over LGBTQ-related issues had been expressed through petitions submitted to the authorities, arguing that international criticism of the bill amounted to improper pressure on Kazakhstan's legislature.

Edil Janbyrşin argued that Kazakhstan as signatory of Geneva Declaration of the Rights of the Child should follow what he described as international precedents, including policies adopted in the United States such as Executive Order 14168, asserting that similar restrictions exist elsewhere. He also claimed that deputies supporting the bill had been subjected to coordinated information campaigns and personal attacks. Other deputies, including Ashat Aimagambetov, Janarbek Äşimjan, Ardaq Nazarov, and Samat Musabaev, echoed these arguments, characterizing media criticism of the bill as political pressure on parliament and a violation of the rights of legislators.

On 18 December, the Senate of Kazakhstan confirmed it during its third reading.

President of Kazakhstan Kassym-Jomart Tokayev signed the proposed legislature into law on 30 December 2025.

== Contents ==
On 29 October, the ruling Amanat party executive secretary and panel discussion chairman Elnur Beisenbaev stated that the text of the draft law will only be publicised once it is adopted.

As reported by CBS News, the legislation planned to ban "information containing propaganda of pedophilia and/or non-traditional sexual orientation in public spaces, as well as in the media". It is planned to affect online media as well.

The law started considering "LGBT propaganda" to be an administrative offence, the punishment of which would be a 10-day arrest and a fine.

The law is part of a larger legislature piece that amends "illegal content". The Government considered "LGBT propaganda" to be "harmful to children's psychological health".

=== Provisions ===
The law amends multiple Kazakh statutes, focusing on archival regulation and restrictions on certain content.

==== Archival amendments ====
The law introduces comprehensive updates to the National Archive Fund and related legislation, clarifying the procedures for storage, preservation, and digital management of archival documents. It establishes rules for permanent and temporary storage, including electronic copies and audiovideo materials, and defines the treatment of personnel records, scientific and technical documentation, and other historically significant documents. Certain records containing private or personal information are protected for 75 years, with access restricted unless authorized by the individual or their heirs. The law also creates the "National" archive status for archives of special state and public significance, and sets out procedures for access, digital archiving, preservation, and government oversight of archival documents, including electronic certification and compliance with digital security standards.

==== Content restrictions ====
The law prohibits the public dissemination of information promoting "non-traditional sexual orientation" or pedophilia through media, online platforms, or telecommunications networks. These restrictions apply across multiple domains, including advertising, child protection, education, online platforms, and mass media, and include rules for content distribution on social media, websites, and other digital channels. While private same-sex relationships remain legal, the legislation limits public discussion, promotion, or positive representation of LGBTQ+ topics, aligning with similar laws in other countries.

==== Implementation and enforcement ====
Most content-related provisions take effect 60 days after the law's official publication, while certain archival amendments are tied to the Digital Code of Kazakhstan, with implementation expected in 2027. Government authorities are responsible for monitoring compliance, enforcing restrictions, and ensuring archival standards are met. The law also allows exemptions for protected personal or private archival records, ensuring that certain sensitive information remains confidential.

== Reactions ==
Many international human rights organizations, including Access Now, the Civil Rights Defenders, Human Rights Watch, the International Partnership for Human Rights, and the Norwegian Helsinki Committee, have openly voiced concerns over the proposal, opposing it. The main concern was around the censorship of media and education and the endangerment of LGBTQ+ Kazakhs, including queer youth, possible in the case the draft law is adopted.

As stated by local civil rights advocates, it threatens to affect the country's children's rights, mass media, online media, advertisements, social media, and legislation affecting culture and education. Before its signing, the legislature was notably criticised by activist Zhanar Sekerbayeva.

== See also ==
- LGBTQ rights in Kazakhstan
- Russian anti-LGBTQ law
