= Zhanar =

Zhanar or Janar (Kazakh or Russian: Жанар) is a Kazakh female given name. Notable people with the name include:

- Zhanar Aitzhanova (born 1965), Kazakhstani minister
- Zhanar Dugalova (born 1987), Kazakh singer
- Zhanar Sekerbayeva (born 1983), Kazakh activist, poet, and journalist
- Zhanar Zhanzunova (born 1985), Kazakhstani judoka
