= Aqtoty Raiymqulova =

Kazakh politician (born 1964)

- Ақтоты Райымқұлова
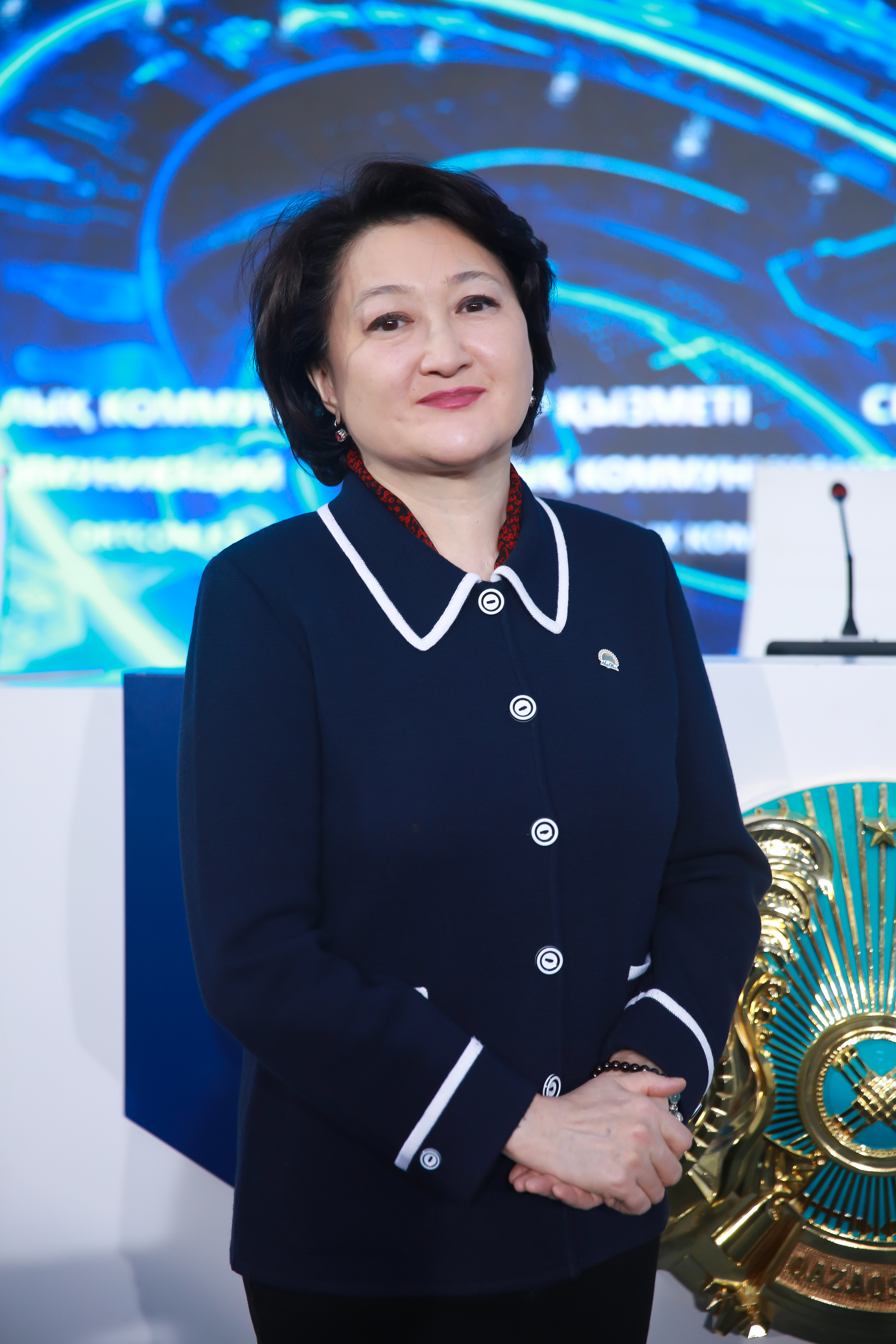
- Raiymqulova in 2020

Minister of Culture and Sports
- In office 17 June 2019 – 11 January 2022
- President: Kassym-Jomart Tokayev
- Prime Minister: Askar Mamin
- Preceded by: Arystanbek Muhamediuly
- Succeeded by: Dauren Abaev

Personal details
- Born: 2 May 1964 (age 62) Alma-Ata, Alma-Ata Oblast, Kazakh SSR, Soviet Union
- Party: Nur Otan
- Education: Kazakh National Conservatory; Almaty Management University

Aqtoty Rahmetollaqyzy Raiymqūlova (Kazakh: Ақтоты Рахметоллақызы Райымқұлова; born 2 May 1964) is a Kazakh politician who is serving as a Minister of Culture and Sports (17 June 2019 – 11 January 2022), Director of the Roza Baglanova Kazakhconcert (6 April 2022).

== Biography ==
=== Early life and education ===
Raiymqulova was born in the city of Alma-Ata (now Almaty) in 1964.

In 1987, she graduated from the Historical and Theoretical Faculty of the Kazakh National Conservatory as a composer, pianist, teacher of musical theoretical disciplines, pianist, accompanist, and soloist of a chamber ensemble. In 2007, Raiymqulova graduated from the Almaty Management University with a master's degree in business. That same year, she earned candidate in art science.

In 2010, Raiymqulova defended her doctorate in art history in thesis topic: "Improving the organizational and economic mechanism, project management in the social and cultural sphere."

=== Early career ===
From 1990 to 1991, Raiymqulova was a teacher at the Kazakh National Women's Teacher Training University and Kazakh National Conservatory where she became a trainee assistant there until 1994. From 1995 to 2011, she was the head of the Department of Conducting, assistant to the Rector, associate professor, acting professor, and Vice-Rector for Socio-Economic Organization of the Kazakh National Conservatory. In 2005, Raiymqulova became head of the Department of Composition and Orchestral Conducting. From 2013 to 2014, she was a Vice Rector for Scientific and Creative Affairs.

=== Political career ===
In June 2014, Raiymqulova became Acting Deputy Chairman of the Committee for Culture and Art of the Ministry of Culture and Sports. From 2014 to 2016, she served as Director of the Department for Culture and Art of the Ministry.

On 3 October 2016, Raiymqulova was appointed as Vice Minister of Culture and Sports. She served the post before becoming the Minister on 17 June 2019.

== Personal life ==
Raiymqulova is married and has 2 children. She speaks Kazakh, Russian and English and has served as a member of Union of Composers of the USSR from 1990 and since 2010, Raiymqulova is a member of the Union of Composers of Kazakhstan.
