= Kulash Shamshidinova =

Kazakh politician (born 1958)

- Күләш Шәмшидинова
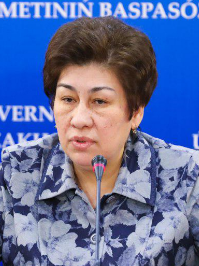
- Shamshidinova in 2019

Minister of Education and Science
- In office 25 February 2019 – 13 June 2019
- President: Nursultan Nazarbayev; Kassym-Jomart Tokayev
- Prime Minister: Askar Mamin
- Preceded by: Erlan Sağadiev
- Succeeded by: Ashat Aimagambetov

Personal details
- Born: 4 March 1958 (age 68) Besqaynar, Almaty Region, Kazakh SSR, Soviet Union
- Party: Nur Otan
- Other political affiliations: QKP (1981–1991)
- Education: Al-Farabi Kazakh National University

Küläş Noğataiqyzy Şämşidinova (Note: Often transliterated as Kulash Nogataiqyzy Shamshidinova through a Russified Romanization of Куляш Ногатайкызы Шамшидинова.) (Kazakh: Күләш Ноғатайқызы Шәмшидинова; born 4 March 1958) is a Kazakh politician and former teacher who served as a Minister of Education and Science from 25 February to 13 June 2019.

== Biography ==
=== Early life and education ===
Shamshidinova was born in the village of Besqaynar in now Almaty Region. In 1979, she graduated from the Faculty of Chemistry of the Al-Farabi Kazakh National University.

=== Career ===
After graduating, Shamshidinova became a High School chemistry teacher. From 1981 to 1987, she served as a Secretary of the Kirovsky District Committee, First Secretary of the Guards District Committee, Secretary of the Taldy-Kurgan Oblast Committee of the LKSMK. In 1987, Shamshidinova became an instructor of the Taldy-Kurgan Regional Party Committee. From 1988 until 1991, she was a Secretary of the Taldy-Kurgan City Party Committee. In 1991, Shamshidinova became the deputy director of the Taldy-Kurgan Regional Institute for Teacher Training and in 1992, as a director of Secondary School No. 18.

From 1996 to 2002, she served as a deputy äkim of Taldıqorğan. In February 2002, Shamshidinova was appointed as a Vice Minister of Education and Science. She served that position until becoming a General Director of the Bobek National Scientific and Practical Educational and Health Center on 23 May 2005. She was again appointed as Vice Minister of Education and Science in April 2007. From October 2009 to February 2019, Shamshidinova served as a chair of the Board of JSC Nazarbayev Intellectual Schools.

On 25 February 2019, after the government was resigned, Shamshidinova was appointed as the Minister of Education and Science. She served the post until being dismissed on 13 June 2019 and being replaced by Ashat Aimagambetov.
