= IPHR =

IPHR may refer to:

- Inside-the-park home run
- International Partnership for Human Rights
