= Ministry of Culture and Information (Kazakhstan) =

Ministry of Culture and Information of the Republic of Kazakhstan
- Қазақстан Республикасының мәдениет және ақпарат министрлігі (Kazakh); Министерство культуры и информации Республики Казахстан (Russian)
- Emblem of Kazakhstan

Agency overview
- Formed: 27 March 2006; 1 September 2023 (current form)
- Preceding agencies: Ministry of Culture, Information and Sports; Ministry of Communications and Information Ministry of Culture; Ministry of Culture and Sports Ministry of Information and Social Development
- Jurisdiction: Government of Kazakhstan
- Headquarters: 8 Mangilik El Avenue, 14 House of Ministries, Astana 010000, Kazakhstan; 51°07′41″N 71°25′50″E
- Minister responsible: Arman Kyrykbayev, Minister of Culture and Information
- Website: www.gov.kz/memleket/entities/mam

The Ministry of Culture and Information of the Republic of Kazakhstan or MCI RK (Note: Kazakh: Қазақстан Республикасының мәдениет және ақпарат министрлігі, ҚР МАМ; Russian: Министерство культуры и информации Республики Казахстан, МКИ РК) is a ministry under the Government of the Republic of Kazakhstan, which manages in the areas of information, interaction between the state and civil society, religious activities, state youth and family policy, modernization of public consciousness, charity, volunteering, mediation, ensuring internal political stability, interfaith and interethnic harmony, as well as within the limits provided for by law, – intersectoral coordination and state regulation.

== History ==
The Ministry of Culture and Information of the Republic of Kazakhstan was originally formed under the name Ministry of Culture, Information and Sports. Its structure and functions were first defined by the Regulation on the Ministry of Culture and Information, approved by Government Resolution No. 1130 on 29 October 2004.

On 27 March 2006, following Presidential Decree No. 73 issued by Nursultan Nazarbayev, the Ministry of Culture, Information and Sports was reorganized and divided, resulting in the establishment of the Ministry of Culture and Information as an independent body. Ermukhamet Ertisbaev became the first Minister of Culture and Information after this reorganization on 28 March.

On 12 March 2010, under Presidential Decree No. 936 the ministry was reorganized and split into two separate bodies: the Ministry of Culture, which received additional powers in the field of religious affairs transferred from the Ministry of Justice, and the Ministry of Communications and Information, which was created on the basis of the Agency for Informatization and Communications and absorbed media-related functions previously held by the Ministry of Culture and Information.

On 20 January 2012, the Ministry of Culture by Presidential Decree No. 226 was reorganized and transformed into the Ministry of Culture and Information. This occurred following the abolition of the Ministry of Communications and Information, whose functions in the fields of information, archives, and documentation were transferred to the newly expanded Ministry. The ministry existed unchanged until 7 March 2014, when it was abolished and its functions were divided between the newly established Ministry of Culture and the Ministry of Investment and Development.

On 1 September 2023, a new governmental restructuring initiated by President Kassym-Jomart Tokayev's Decree No. 318 separated cultural, archival, information, and creative industry functions from the former Ministry of Culture and Sports and the Ministry of Information and Social Development. Under this reform, the Ministry of Culture and Information was re-established as an independent central executive body. On 2 September 2023, Aida Balaeva was appointed Minister of Culture and Information.

== Committees ==
The structure of the Ministry includes:

- Committee on Archives, Records and Books
- Committee of Culture
- Committee for the Development of Interethnic Relations
- Committee on Information
- Committee on Youth and Family Affairs
- Committee on Civil Society Affairs
- Committee for Religious Affairs

== Objectives ==
1. Participation in the formation and implementation of state policy in the field of information, protection of children from information harmful to their health and development;
2. Implementation of state regulation in the field of television and radio broadcasting and mass media;
3. Carrying out the formation, development and ensuring the security of the single information space of the Republic of Kazakhstan, as well as interdepartmental coordination of activities to ensure the security of the information space;
4. International cooperation in the field of protection of children from information harmful to their health and development, the media;
5. Maintaining gender balance in hiring and promotion of employees;
6. Participation in the interaction of the state and civil society, religious activities, state youth and family policy, modernization of public consciousness, charity, volunteer activities, mediation, ensuring internal political stability, interfaith and interethnic harmony;
7. Implementation of intersectoral coordination in the areas of activity within the competence of the Ministry;
8. Other tasks assigned to the Ministry.

== List of ministers ==
- Ermukhamet Ertisbaev (28 March 2006 – 12 May 2008)
- Mukhtar Kul-Mukhammed (12 May 2008 – 12 March 2010)
- Vacant; ministry defunct (2010–2012)
- Darhan Mynbai (23 January 2012 – 16 January 2013)
- Mukhtar Kul-Mukhammed (16 January 2013 – 13 March 2014)
- Vacant; ministry defunct (2014–2023)
- Aida Balaeva (2 September 2023 – 31 August 2026)
- Arman Kyrykbayev (3 September 2026 - incumbent)

== See also ==
- Government of Kazakhstan
- Culture of Kazakhstan
- Ministry of Culture, Information and Sports
- Ministry of Culture (Kazakhstan)
- Ministry of Communications and Information (Kazakhstan)
- Ministry of Investment and Development (Kazakhstan)
- Ministry of Culture and Sports (Kazakhstan)
- Ministry of Information and Social Development
