= Erkegali Rakhmadiyev =

Soviet and Kazakhstani composer and pedagogue

- Еркеғали Рахмадиев
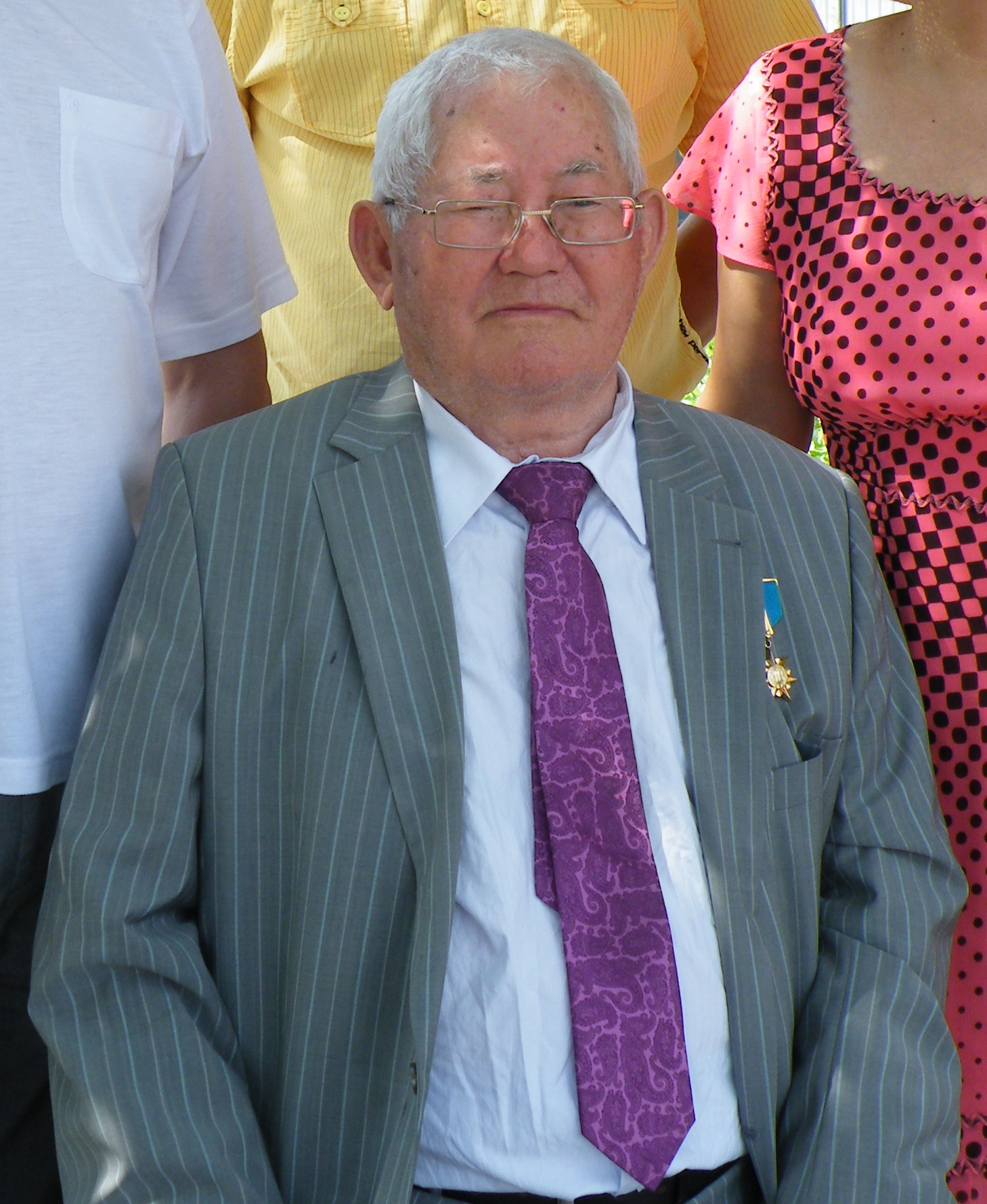
- Rakhmadiyev in 2012
- Born: Erkegali Rakhmadiyevich Rakhmadiyev; 1 August 1932; Almaty Region, Kazakh ASSR, RSFSR, Soviet Union
- Died: 9 April 2013 (aged 80); Almaty, Kazakhstan
- Education: The Kurmangazy Kazakh National Conservatory
- Occupations: Composer, music pedagogue

Erkegali Rakhmadiyev (Kazakh: Еркеғали Рахмадиұлы Рахмадиев, Erkeğali Rahmadiūly Rahmadiev, 1 August 1932 – 9 April 2013) was a Soviet and Kazakhstani composer and pedagogue. People's Artist of the USSR (1981). Hero of Labour of Kazakhstan (2010).

== Biography ==
Erkegali Rakhmadiyev was born in Shubartau, East Kazakhstan Region, to the family of Rakhmadi Zhabykbayev, a well-known aqyn and musician. From childhood, Erkegali was surrounded with folk music, he listened to performances by aqyns and dombra players and learned to play and perform as well.

In 1952, he graduated from Tchaikovsky Alma-Ata Music Academy and joined Kurmangazy Kazakh Conservatoire to study under the well-known composer Yevgeny Brusilovsky (he finished these studies in 1957).

Erkegali’s first job was that of a music teacher, and he already became the head of Kurmangazy Kazakh State Conservatoire at the age of 35. In 1969 he was awarded the academic degree of docent and a professor’s degree followed in 1979. Rakhmadiyev became the Chairman of Kazakhstan’s Union of Composers in 1968.

He was an active public figure, serving as a member of the 7th through 11th Supreme Soviets of the Kazakh SSR and a member of the Supreme Soviet of the Soviet Union.

After the collapse of the Soviet Union, at the dawn of newly found sovereignty, Kazakhstani authorities invited Erkegali Rakhmadiyev to head the State Committee for Culture of the Republic of Kazakhstan. Later he was appointed in a position of Minister of Culture of Kazakhstan.

Mr. Rakhmadiyev spent his twilight years living in Astana and working as a consultant to the National Opera Theater named after Baiseitova. He died in Almaty on April 9, 2013.

== Awards and honors ==
- Order of the Red Banner of Labour (1971);
- Order of Otan (2010);
- People's Artist of the USSR (1981);
- People’s Artist of the Kazakh SSR (1975);
- Kazakhstannyn Embek Eri honor with a Gold Star — for outstanding contribution to the social and artistic development of the Republic of Kazakhstan, development of national culture and public work (2010).

== Selected works ==
=== Operas ===
- Kamar-Sulu(1963);
- Alpamys (1973);
- Song of Virgin Soil (1980);
- Abylai-khan (1999).

=== Kui ===
- Kui Dairabay (1961);
- Kudasha-Duman (1973).

== Filmography ==
- The Road of Life (1959, together with Aleksandr Zatsepin);
- The Land of the Fathers (1966);
- The End of the Ataman (1970);
- Trans-Siberian Express (1977).
