= Dauren Abaev =

Kazakh politician and diplomat (born 1979)

- Дәурен Абаев
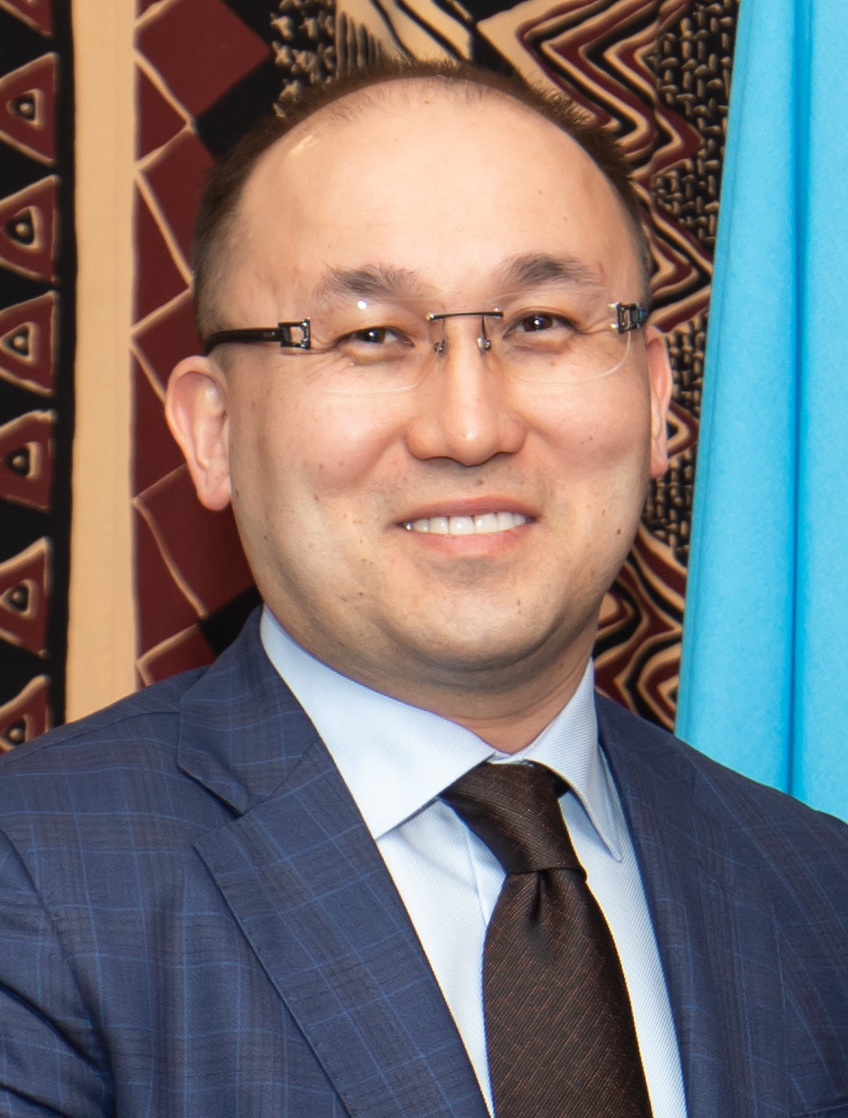
- Abaev in 2018

Ambassador of Kazakhstan to Russia
- Incumbent
- Assumed office 3 May 2023
- President: Kassym-Jomart Tokayev
- Preceded by: Ermek Köşerbaev

Minister of Culture and Sports
- In office 11 January 2022 – 4 January 2023
- President: Kassym-Jomart Tokayev
- Preceded by: Aqtoty Raiymqulova
- Succeeded by: Ashat Oralov

First Deputy Head of the Presidential Administration of Kazakhstan
- In office 4 May 2020 – 11 January 2022
- President: Kassym-Jomart Tokayev
- Preceded by: Mäulen Äşimbaev
- Succeeded by: Timur Suleimenov

Press Secretary of the President
- In office 7 October 2011 – 6 May 2016
- President: Nursultan Nazarbayev
- Preceded by: Baglan Mailybayev
- Succeeded by: Aidos Ukibay

Minister of Information and Social Development
- In office 25 February 2019 – 4 May 2020
- President: Kassym-Jomart Tokayev; Nursultan Nazarbayev
- Prime Minister: Askar Mamin
- Preceded by: Darhan Kaletaev (Social Development)
- Succeeded by: Aida Balaeva

Minister of Information and Communications
- In office 6 May 2016 – 25 February 2019
- President: Nursultan Nazarbayev
- Prime Minister: Karim Massimov; Bakhytzhan Sagintayev; Askar Mamin (Acting)
- Preceded by: Office established
- Succeeded by: Office abolished

Personal details
- Born: 18 April 1979 (age 47) Almaty Region, Kazakh SSR, Soviet Union
- Spouse: Aynura Abaeva
- Children: 4
- Education: Al-Farabi Kazakh National University; Leiden University; Eurasian Humanitarian Institute

Däuren Äskerbekūly Abaev (Kazakh: Дәурен Әскербекұлы Абаев, born 18 April 1979) is a Kazakh politician, who served as a Minister of Culture and Sports from 2022 to 2023. Since March 2023, Deputy Secretary General of the Commonwealth of Independent States. Since July 2023, Ambassador Extraordinary and Plenipotentiary of the Republic of Kazakhstan to the Russian Federation. The first secretary of the 1st class.

== Biography ==
Abaev was born in the Almaty Region in 1979.

He graduated from Al-Farabi Kazakh National University in 2001. In 2006, Abaev completed his studies at Leiden University. In 2014, while serving as Press Secretary, he finished the Eurasian Humanitarian Institute.

=== Political career ===
From 2001 to 2003, he worked in various positions in the central office of the Ministry of Foreign Affairs occupying as the referent, attache, and the third secretary.

In May 2007, he became the head of the Press Service Department of the Ministry of Foreign Affairs. From December 2007 to December 2008, Abaev was a chief expert, consultant to the Protocol of the President. In December 2008, he became a Deputy Press Secretary of the President. From October 2009 to 2011, Abaev was a State Inspector of the Department of State Control and Organizational and Territorial Work of the Administration.

From 6 October 2011 to 6 May 2016, he was the Press Secretary of the President, as well as an Advisor to the Head of State.

On 6 May 2016, by a presidential decree, Abaev was appointed Head of the new Ministry of Information and Communications that was established due to the 2016 Kazakh protests.

From 25 February 2019 to 4 May 2020, Abaev served as the Minister of Information and Social Development.

On 4 May 2020 to 11 January 2022, he was appointed as the First Deputy Head of the Presidential Administration.

From 11 January 2022 to 4 January 2023 - Minister of Culture and Sports of the Republic of Kazakhstan.

=== Diplomatic career ===
In 2003, he was the third secretary of the Kazakhstan Embassy in Azerbaijan.

From 2003 to 2007, Abaev served as a second secretary, as well as the chargé d'affaires of Kazakhstan in the Netherlands

On March 2, 2023, he was appointed Deputy secretary general of the CIS.

On July 3, 2023, he was appointed ambassador extraordinary and plenipotentiary of the Republic of Kazakhstan to Russia.
