= LGBTQ rights in Kazakhstan =

- Kazakhstan
- Legal status: Homosexuality decriminalised nationwide since late 1997 de facto, since 1998 de jure; age of consent is equalised and full legalisation since late 1997
- Gender identity: Transgender people allowed to change legal gender following surgery, medical examinations, hormone therapy and sterilisation since 2003
- Military: Gays, lesbians and bisexuals allowed to serve in the military since 2022
- Discrimination protections: No law prohibiting discrimination based on sexual orientation (see below)

Family rights
- Recognition of relationships: No recognition of same-sex couples
- Restrictions: Code on Marriage and Family explicitly bans persons of the same sex from marrying each other.
- Adoption: Adoption by single LGBT people is banned since 2024

Lesbian, gay, bisexual, transgender and queer (LGBTQ) people in Kazakhstan face significant challenges not experienced by non-LGBTQ residents. Both male and female kinds of same-sex sexual activity are legal in Kazakhstan, but same-sex couples and households headed by same-sex couples are not eligible for the same legal protections available to opposite-sex married couples.

Since the Dissolution of the Soviet Union, Kazakhstan decriminalised both male and female same-sex sexual activity in late 1997 de facto (since 1998 de jure) and the age of consent was equalised to that of heterosexual activity in late 1997 de facto (since 1998 de jure). Transgender people have been allowed to legally change their gender since 2003. LGBTQ people are also allowed to serve in the military since 2022. LGBTQ rights in Kazakhstan remain severely limited and homosexuality remains highly stigmatised in Kazakh society, with no LGBTQ NGOs, strong overtones of official intolerance and no equal rights on the basis of sexual orientation in areas such as employment, education, media, and the provision of goods and services, amongst others.

On 28 October 2025, the Mäjilis, Parliament's lower house, proposed a law explicitly prohibiting "LGBT propaganda", despite opposition from several international human rights organizations, including Human Rights Watch. The legislation would ban "information containing propaganda of pedophilia and/or non-traditional sexual orientation" in both public spaces and the media. Violations would be punishable by a 10-day arrest and a fine. It was passed and signed by President Kassym-Jomart Tokayev on 30 December 2025. Many critics have commented on its similarity to the 2013 Russian anti-LGBTQ law. As reported by CBS News and Reuters, in recent years, some countries including Georgia and the EU members Hungary and Bulgaria, have also passed anti-LGBTQ "propaganda" laws that observers say are inspired by Russia's. Kazakhstan is now among the countries prohibiting "LGBTQ propaganda" by law alongside Russia, Hungary, and Georgia.

Many LGBTQ individuals in Kazakhstan tend to hide their sexual orientation in public. Those who are "out" frequently face discrimination, stigmatization and violence.

== History ==
Genghis Khan banned homosexual acts in the Mongol Empire and made them punishable by death. LGBTQ history in Kazakhstan has been marked by periods of both tolerance and persecution and dates back to the early 20th century, when homosexuality was first decriminalised in 1917 following the October Revolution, which established the Soviet Union.

The Bolshevik government was influenced by the ideas of Magnus Hirschfeld, a German scientist who argued that homosexuality was a natural manifestation of human sexuality. However, in 1933 the Soviet Union re-criminalised homosexuality as part of a broader campaign against "deviant" behaviour. Discrimination against LGBTQ individuals persisted in the Soviet era, and homosexuality was not officially declassified as a mental illness until 16 July 1997 de facto, since 1998 de jure.

=== Anti-LGBTQ "propaganda" law ===
In October 2025, as response to a similar petition from 2024, 15 Members of the Mäjilis proposed a law that would oppose "LGBT propaganda". Officially, it plans to ban "information containing propaganda of pedophilia and/or non-traditional sexual orientation in public spaces, as well as in the media". The petition and draft law sparked concerns by experts from the United Nations and several international human rights organizations, including Access Now, the Civil Rights Defenders, Human Rights Watch, the International Partnership for Human Rights, and the Norwegian Helsinki Committee. The main concern was around the possible censorship of media and the likely endangerement of LGBTQ+ Kazakhs, including queer youth, possible in the case the legislation is adopted.

== Legality of same-sex sexual activity ==
=== Decriminalisation process ===
Both male and female same-sex sexual activity have been legal in Kazakhstan since late 1997, when under the revised criminal code same-sex relations between consenting adults was no longer a criminal offence. Prior to 1997, Article 104 of the Penal Code of Kazakhstan used to criminalise "buggery". This legislation followed the corresponding Section 121 from the former Soviet Union, which only specifically criminalised anal intercourse between men. In late 1997 the law was repealed and replaced with a common age of consent for all sexual activity of 16 years. Lesbianism was never a criminal offence. In 1998, consensual sex between same-sex couples became lawful. There are currently no provisions in the Constitution of Kazakhstan that criminalise any aspect of same-sex sexual relations.

== Gender identity and expression ==
Since 2003, transgender individuals have been allowed to change their legal gender on their official identity documents in Kazakhstan. People who want to change their legal gender have to have received a diagnosis of "gender identity disorder" which involves several medical tests and a 30-day psychiatric evaluation. The psychiatric evaluations are held by medical commissions, but these commissions were previously only able to be assembled in Almaty, Kazakhstan's largest city. Since 2023, medical commissions responsible for diagnoses of "transsexualism" can now be assembled in every region in Kazakhstan. In practice, however, the only functioning commission is based in Almaty, due to stipulations for separate rooms for urologists, gynaecologists and other kinds of specialist, which cannot be satisfied anywhere else but Almaty at present.

Before trans people in Kazakhstan can be evaluated by a medical commission, they must pay around ₸100, 000 tenge. If the commission's decision is positive, applicants receive a certificate which they must use within 6 months to initiate medical transition, otherwise they must start the process anew.

In 2011, new guidelines were established which only allowed changes to be made to identity documents after applicants had undergone gender affirming surgery, physical and psychiatric medical examinations, hormone therapy and sterilisation. Additionally, people under 21 are not allowed to change their gender on their official identity documents.

Transgender rights activists in Kazakhstan advocated for amendments and approached the Ministry of Health and other state institutions, which resulted in the adoption of comparatively better processes of legal gender recognition than exist in neighbouring countries as of 2017.

== Recognition of same-sex relationships ==
Kazakhstan does not recognise same-sex marriage or civil unions.

== Adoption and parenting ==
As of 2020, same-sex couples can't legally adopt children in Kazakhstan.

In February 2024, President Tokayev signed a law that would prohibit the adoption of orphans by same-sex couples. Deputy Minister of Education Natalya Jumadildaeva even stated, that the sexual orientation of the to-be parent would play a "key role" in the approval of the candidacy. She stated that it would be configured through a "special psychological test". The move was especially criticised by the independent media for setting the Russian law as an example.

== Discrimination protections ==
The violence and discrimination against LGBTQ people in Kazakhstan are fairly common and often not reported to the police. No laws exist yet in Kazakhstan that protect LGBTQ people from discrimination in employment, education, housing, health care, public accommodations or credit.

== Blood donation ==
There are no restrictions on gay and bisexual men from donating blood by the Government of Kazakhstan.

== Military service ==
On 14 June 2012, Defense Minister Adilbek Zhaksybekov was reported to have declared that gay men are not welcome in the nation's military, saying that they are exempt because they have ‘a disorder of sexual desire’. Since 2022, lesbians, gays, and bisexuals are allowed to serve openly in the military. The Ministry of Defense in 2022, said in an interview that no one is banned from serving in the military because of their sexual orientation.

== 2025 anti-LGBT legislation ==
On 26 May 2015, the Constitutional Council of Kazakhstan declared a pending bill, which would have banned the "propaganda of nontraditional sexual orientation", unconstitutional. The council rejected it because of its vague wording. The bill passed the Senate, Parliament's upper house, in February 2015 and was sent to President Nursultan Nazarbayev for signature. It had already been approved by the lower house. Human Rights Watch said: "By rejecting this propaganda bill, Kazakhstan’s Constitutional Council set an important precedent against the adoption of discriminatory legislation."

In September 2019, the Supreme Court ruled in a landmark case that two women would receive compensation from a Facebook user who posted a video showing them kissing without their permission. The video solicited a large number of homophobic and murderous comments, and was viewed 60,000 times in a day before being taken down by the user. Human Rights Watch hailed the ruling as a milestone for privacy rights.

In April 2023, Member of the Mäjilis Ardaq Nazarov proposed to prohibit movies and series that bring up the topic of LGBTQ. On 5 April 2024, Members of the Mäjilis Ashat Aimagambetov and Janarbek Äşimjanov proposed to alter the "On mass media" law in a way that would prohibit the mentions of LGBTQ people throughout Kazakh mass media. Äşimjanov then claimed that this alteration would not censor information, but rather prohibit propaganda and the "imposing of biased information". It was also clarified that the change would not affect news-styled information about LGBTQ and would, rather, help to "stop the promotion of ideas that can cause division in society". It is notable that if this change were to be adopted, the law's new look would liken "LGBT propaganda" to "propaganda or agitation of the cult of cruelty and violence, social, racial, national, religious, class and clan superiority". Aimagambetov, unlike Äşimjanov, refused to comment on the proposal. On April 10, 2024, other Mäjilismen, specifically Edil Jañbyrşin and Samat Musabaev, proposed criminal prosecution of people promoting "LGBT propaganda".

On 12 November 2025, Mäjilis approved a harsher version of the draft law in its second hearing. The legislation would ban "information containing propaganda of pedophilia and/or non-traditional sexual orientation" in both public spaces and the media. Violations would be punishable by a 10-day arrest and a fine.

== Public opinion ==
In May 2015, PlanetRomeo, an LGBTQ social network, published its first Gay Happiness Index (GHI). Gay men from over 120 countries were asked about how they feel about society's view on homosexuality, how do they experience the way they are treated by other people and how satisfied are they with their lives. Kazakhstan was ranked 118th, just above Ghana and below Burkina Faso, with a GHI score of 29.

According to a June 2015-June 2016 survey by the Pew Research Center, 89% of people in Kazakhstan opposed same-sex marriage, with only 7% supporting it.

In 2016 the Spiritual Directorate of Muslims of Kazakhstan published a fatwa against sex-reassignment surgeries (SRS).

== LGBTQ rights movements ==
=== Communities and news portals, sorted by founding date, ascending ===
- 2014: Alma-TQ is an activist group working to advance the rights of trans and queer communities in Kazakhstan.
- 2015: Femenita (in Russian) is a grassroots, queer-feminist activist group working on advancement of LBQ women's rights and freedoms and dignified life on the basis of systematic feedback loop from the communities in Kazakhstan.
- 2017: Kok.team (Kazakh: Köktem), the first LGBTQ mass media in Kazakhstan (in Kazakh) (in English) (in Russian)
- 2018: AmanBol (in Kazakh) (in Russian) is the first HIV self-testing program in Central Asia, dedicated to providing service for MSM and transgender persons in Kazakhstan.
- 2022: QUEER KZ is a civic initiative dedicated to empowering and mobilising the LGBTQIA+ community in Kazakhstan through an intersectional approach.
- 2024: Human Rights LGBTQIA+ initiative REQUEST is a Kazakhstan-based initiative focused on protection and advancing the rights of LGBTQIA+ through legal support, advocacy, monitoring, education and strategic litigation.

Trans Docha is a Kazakhstan-based activist organisation focused on supporting trans sex workers.

== Living conditions ==
LGBTQ people in Kazakhstan face discrimination and prejudice on the grounds of their sexual orientation or gender identity during the course of their everyday lives. Manifestation of negative attitudes toward LGBTQ people, such as social exclusion, taunting, and violence, often cause the victims physical, psychological and emotional harm. In order to avoid the dangers posed by people who do not approve of non-heterosexual sexual orientations, many LGBTQ people feel compelled to keep their sexual orientation or gender identity a secret from almost all people in their lives. The majority regard it as necessary to conceal their sexual orientation or gender identity from people in the workplace in order to retain their jobs and avoid hostility from bosses and co-workers. Attempts to report homophobic and transphobic violence to police are often met with resistance and even hostility on the part of law enforcement officers.

A 2011 cross-national study by the University of Chicago demonstrated that a growing trend of LGBTQ acceptance was either slowed or reversed in Russia and some other former USSR republics, a direct opposite of world trends.

=== Statistics ===
According to a 2018 survey, conducted by the Republican Centre for AIDS Prevention and Control and the Kazakh Ministry of Health, there were about 62,000 men who have sex with men in Kazakhstan; about 6,000 in Almaty, 3,300 in Astana, and 4,900 in Karaganda Region. This number, however, is expected to be much higher, due to societal homophobia which may prevent individuals from coming out.

=== United Nations ===
Kazakhstan has opposed landmark LGBTQ reforms at the United Nations. In 2011, it opposed the "joint statement on ending acts of violence and related human rights violations based on sexual orientation and gender identity" at the United Nations.

== Notable individuals ==
- Abdel Mukhtarov, singer and LGBTQ rights activist
- Adil Liyan, producer/journalist
- Altynai Kambekova, LGBTQ rights activist
- Anatoly Chernousov, LGBTQ rights activist
- Amir Shaikezhanov, LGBTQ rights activist
- Binazir Ermaganbetova, humour blogger/singer
- Daniyar Sabitov, LGBTQ rights activist
- Farema Kazakpayeva, singer
- Gasan Akhmedov, LGBTQ rights activist
- Gulzada Serzhan, LGBTQ rights activist
- Natasha Maximova, the Kazakh-born first transgender woman on a magazine cover in Russia.
- Nurbibi Nurkadilova, LGBTQ rights activist and Zamanbek Nurkadilov's granddaughter
- Nurlan Alimkhodzhaev, visagiste
- Zarina Baibolova, stand-up comedian
- Yan Ray, fashion photographer
- Zhanar Sekerbayeva, LGBTQ rights activist

== Summary table ==
| | Yes/No | Notes |
Same-sex sexual activity
| Same-sex sexual activity legal | No | Since 1997 de facto, since 1998 de jure, nationwide (Lesbianism was never a criminal offence) |
| Age of consent equalised and full legalisation (16) | Yes | Since 1997 |
| Freedom of expression | No | Since 2026 imprisonment for a term of 2 to 5 months as a penalty. |
Discrimination laws
| Anti-discrimination laws in employment only | No | |
| Anti-discrimination laws in the provision of goods and services | No | |
| Anti-discrimination laws in the media | No | |
| Anti-discrimination laws in all other areas (incl. indirect discrimination, hate speech) | No | |
| Anti-discrimination laws concerning gender identity in all areas | No | |
| LGBTQ sex education and relationships taught in schools | No | |
| Hate crime law includes sexual orientation and gender identity | No | |
Same-sex unions
| Same-sex marriages | No | (Constitutional ban since 2026) |
| Recognition of same-sex couples (e.g. unregistered cohabitation, life partnership) | No | |
Adoption and children
| Adoption by single homosexuals in Kazakhstan or (in case of Kazakhstani children) in foreign countries that do not recognise same-sex marriage | No | |
| Adoption of Kazakhstani children by single homosexuals or same-sex couples in foreign countries that do recognise same-sex marriage | No | |
| Stepchild adoption by same-sex couples | No | |
| Joint adoption by same-sex couples | No | |
| Access to IVF for lesbians and automatic parenthood for both spouses after birth | No | Only married couples and single women may access IVF treatments |
| Commercial surrogacy for gay male couples | No | Both altruistic and commercial surrogacies are not banned and legal for heterosexual couples |
Military service
| LGBTQ people allowed to serve openly in the military | Yes | Since 2022 |
Transgender rights
| Right to change legal gender | Yes | Since 2003; but requires sex reassignment surgery, sterilisation, hormone therapy and medical examinations |
| Transgender identity declassified as an illness | No | |
| Ability to change legal gender without a psychiatric or psychological evaluation | No | |
| Ability to change legal gender without court approval | No | |
| Ability to change legal gender for minors | No | |
| Ability to change legal name without a psychiatric or psychological evaluation | No | |
| Transgender people can change gender marker without sterilisation | No | |
| Right to change legal gender without having to end marriage | No | |
| Third gender option | No | |
Other
| Conversion therapy banned on minors | No | |
| Homosexuality declassified as an illness | No | |
| MSMs allowed to donate blood | Yes | Legal |

== See also ==
- Kazakh anti-LGBTQ law
- LGBTQ rights in Asia
- LGBTQ rights in Europe
- Politics of Kazakhstan
- Human rights in Kazakhstan
- Recognition of same-sex unions in Europe
- Homosexuality and Islam
- LGBTQ rights by country or territory
- Transgender people and religion
- Think of the children
