= Arystanbek Muhamediuly =

Kazakh politician (born 1963)

- Арыстанбек Мұхамедиұлы
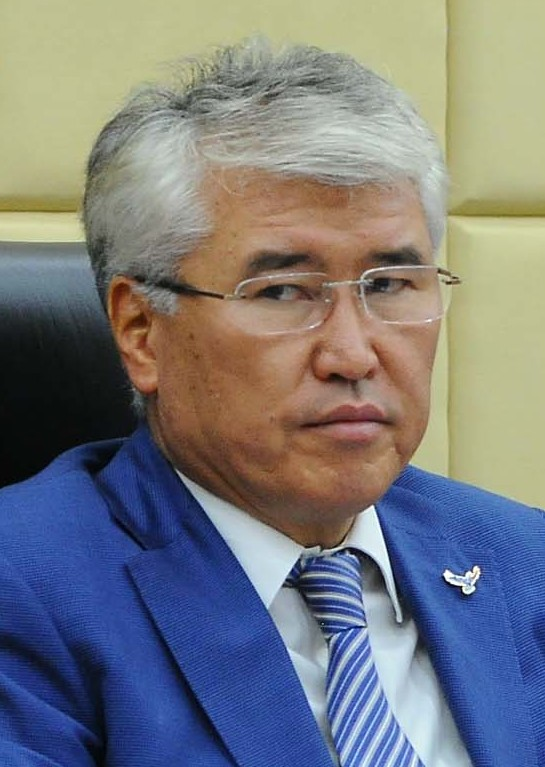
- Arystanbek in 2018

Director of the National Museum of Kazakhstan
- In office 10 July 2019 – May 2022

Minister of Culture and Sport
- In office 6 August 2014 – 17 June 2019
- President: Nursultan Nazarbayev; Kassym-Jomart Tokayev
- Preceded by: Himself as Minister of Culture
- Succeeded by: Aqtoty Raiymqulova

Minister of Culture
- In office 13 March 2014 – 6 August 2014
- President: Nursultan Nazarbayev
- Preceded by: Mukhtar Kul-Mukhammed (Culture and Information)
- Succeeded by: Himself as Minister of Culture and Sport

Personal details
- Born: 11 February 1963 (age 63) Tuzdybastau, Kazakh SSR, Soviet Union
- Party: Nur Otan
- Spouse: Nalia Iskakova
- Children: 3
- Education: Kazakh National Conservatory; Academy of Public Administration; Al-Farabi Kazakh National University

Arystanbek Mūhamediūly (Kazakh: Арыстанбек Мұхамедиұлы; born 11 February 1963) is a Kazakh politician who served as a Minister of Culture and Sports from 11 March 2014 to 17 June 2019. He later served as director of the National Museum of the Republic of Kazakhstan until his arrest for corruption.

Arystanbek is author of a number of musical works, such as: marches for a brass band, Bahyt Asy and Jastar waltz compositions, songs such as Astana, Asyl sezim, and Dostarym, as well as publications on cultural issues and arts.

== Early life and education ==
Arystanbek was born in the village of Tuzdybastau in Almaty Region. He graduated from the Kazakh National Conservatory in 1986 and in 1997, from the Academy of Public Administration. In 2001, Arystanbek completed graduate school in the Al-Farabi Kazakh National University. In 2003, he defended his Ph.D. thesis on the topic: "Kazakhstan-Unesco: aspects of cultural cooperation".

== Career ==
Arystanbek began his career in 1984 as a philharmonic artist in the Jambyl Kazakh State Philharmonic. In 1991, he became a chief specialist in the Ministry of Culture where he served as an assistant from 1993. In 1994, Arystanbek became the director of the Gulder State Ensemble. From 1997 to 2001, he served as the head of the Presidential Orchestra before becoming the General Director of the Directorate of Republican and International Cultural Programs.

From 2005, Arystanbek was the President of the Joint Stock Company Kazakh Kuenderі until he was appointed as a Vice Minister of Culture and Information in April 2006. In March 2007, he became the chief inspector of the Domestic Policy Sector of the Administration of the President of the Republic of Kazakhstan. From February to April 2008, Arystanbek served as the head of the Sector of the Internal Policy Department of the Administration of the President of the Republic of Kazakhstan before becoming the rector of the Kazakh National Academy of Arts.

On 11 March 2014, he was appointed as a Minister of Culture. He served the post before being appointed on 6 August 2014 as Minister of Culture and Sports. During his tenure, he was criticized on several occasions such as agreeing with President Nursultan Nazarbayev for saying how Kazakhs are living in their best times of the 550-year history and how it was his work that the nation gained its independence in 1991. He was also criticized for inappropriate remarks about movies "shaming Kazakhstan" and "Kyrgyz washing toilets". In 2016, several women accused Muhamediuly of sexual harassment. On 17 June 2019, by the Decree of the President of Kazakhstan, Arystanbek was relieved from his post after serving for almost five years.

Since 10 July 2019, he has been the director of the National Museum of the Republic of Kazakhstan in Nur-Sultan.

On May 16, 2022, the Anti-Corruption Service reported that Arystanbek was arrested on suspicion of embezzlement of budget funds. According to the agency, a pre-trial investigation is being conducted against officials of the RSE National Museum of the Republic of Kazakhstan of the Ministry of Culture and Sports on the grounds of embezzlement of budget funds. In the same month, the official attempted suicide while he was in a temporary detention facility.

== Personal life ==
Arystanbek is married to Nalia Iskakova and has two sons and one daughter.

On 5 January 2020, his mother, Kulimkan Tulendieva, died.
