= Arman Qyryqbaev =

Kazakhstani politician

Arman Kyrykbayev
- Арман Қырықбаев
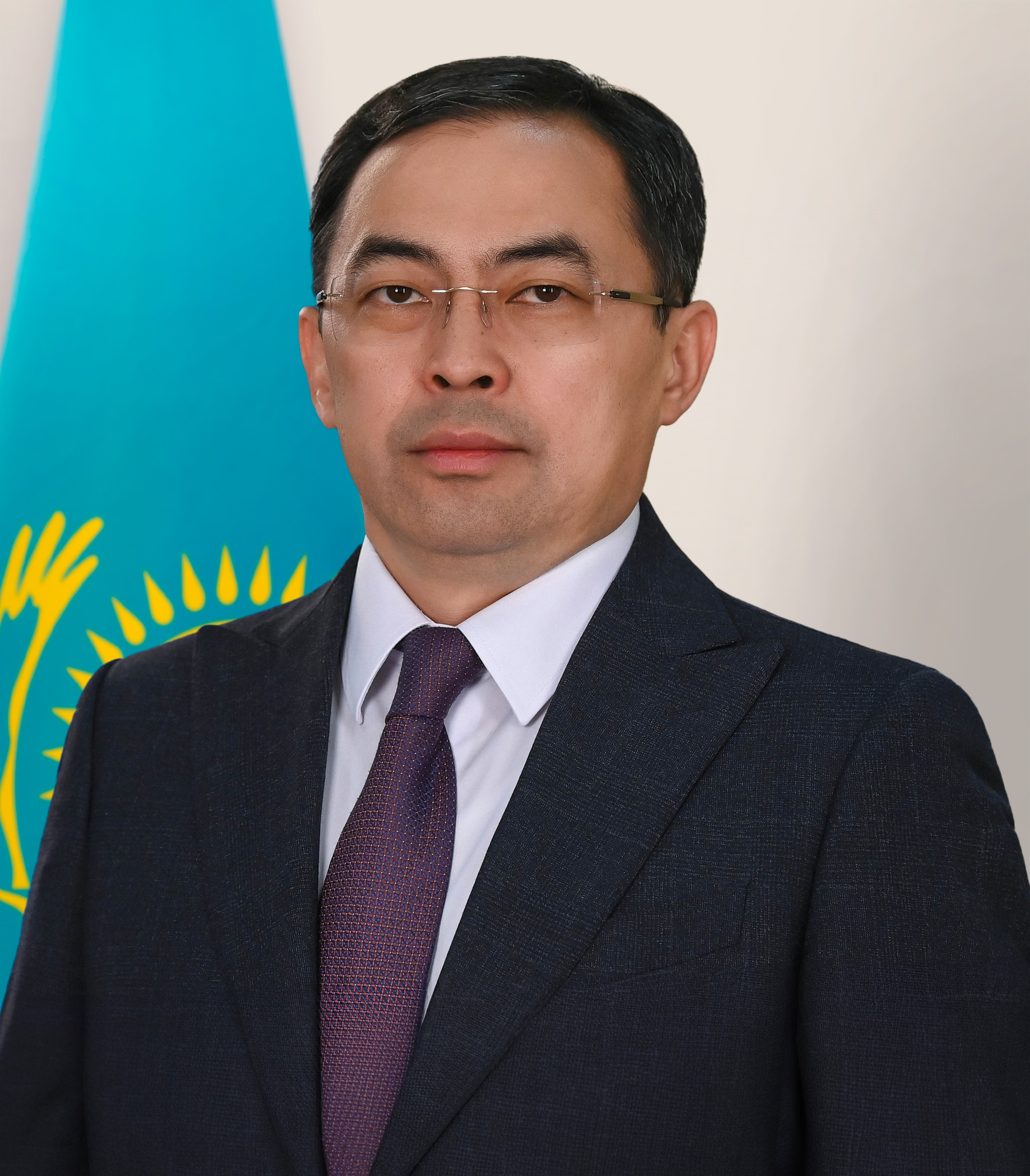

Minister of Culture and Information
- Incumbent
- Assumed office 3 September 2026
- President: Kassym-Jomart Tokayev
- Prime Minister: Oljas Bektenov
- Preceded by: Aida Balaeva

Personal details
- Born: 4 July 1974 (age 52) Tselinograd, Kazakh SSR, Soviet Union
- Education: Kazakh State Academy of Management
- Awards: Order of Parasat; Order of Kurmet

Arman Orazbayuly Kyrykbayev (Kazakh: Арман Оразбайұлы Қырықбаев; born October 20, 1976, Tselinograd, Kazakh SSR, USSR) is a Kazakhstani politician. He has served as the Minister of Culture and Information of Kazakhstan since 2026 at the Second Bektenov Government. From 2025 to 2026, he served as an aide to the President of Kazakhstan, Kassym-Jomart Tokayev, handling domestic policy and communications.

== Biography ==
Arman Orazbayuly Kyrykbayev was born on October 20, 1976, in the city of Tselinograd, then part of the Kazakh SSR, a republic of the Soviet Union.

In 1996, after graduating from the Kazakh State Academy of Management with a degree in economics, Kyrykbayev began working at the Ministry of Foreign Affairs of Kazakhstan as a referent in the Department for the CIS and Baltic States.

From 1997 to 2000, he served as an attaché and subsequently as a third secretary at the Embassy of Kazakhstan in Uzbekistan.

In 2002, Kyrykbayev graduated from the Diplomatic Academy of the Ministry of Foreign Affairs of Kazakhstan, specializing in international relations, and became a second secretary at the Ministry.

From 2002 to 2004, he served as Director of the Strategy and Monitoring Department at AVE Corporation CJSC.

From 2004 to 2005, he was the General Director of K-MART LLP.

In 2005, Kyrykbayev was appointed Deputy Akim (Deputy Head) of the Medeu District of Almaty under Vasily Krylov; concurrently, he headed the city's State Fund for Youth Policy Development.

From 2006 to 2008, he headed the Department of Socio-Political Work and Public Relations at the Ministry of Culture and Information, and subsequently led the Committee on Culture from 2008 to 2010. In 2010, the Akim of the Karaganda Region, Abelgazi Kusainov, appointed Kyrykbayev as his deputy.

On February 16, 2012, by decree of Prime Minister Karim Massimov, Kyrykbayev returned to the Ministry of Culture and was appointed Deputy Minister under Darkhan Mynbay.

In 2014, he became an advisor to Bauyrjan Baibek, the First Deputy Chairman of the Nur Otan party.

In 2015, following Bauyrzhan Baibek's appointment as Akim of Almaty, Kyrykbayev followed him and was appointed his deputy responsible for domestic policy, healthcare, education, culture, youth policy, and language development. When Baibek became the Executive Secretary of Nur Otan on June 28, 2019, Kyrykbayev took study leave on July 6, though no official announcements regarding his dismissal from the post were made. On December 26 of that same year, Kyrykbayev was appointed Secretary of the same party.

In 2022, he was once again appointed Deputy Akim of Almaty, this time under Yerbolat Dossayev.

On March 9, 2024, by decree of President Kassym-Jomart Tokayev, he became the head of the Communications Department within the Presidential Administration. Almost a year later, on February 24, 2025, Tokayev appointed Kyrykbayev as his Assistant for Domestic Policy and Communications.

On September 3, 2026, Arman Kyrykbayev’s candidacy for the post of Minister of Culture and Information was approved by the Kurultai, the Kazakh parliament and confirmed by a decree from President Tokayev, whereupon he joined Olzhas Bektenov’s second cabinet. Awards Awarded the Order of Parasat (2023) and the Order of Kurmet (2015), as well as government and jubilee medals of the Republic of Kazakhstan.
