= Aida Balaeva =

Kazakh politician (born 1974)

- Аида Балаева
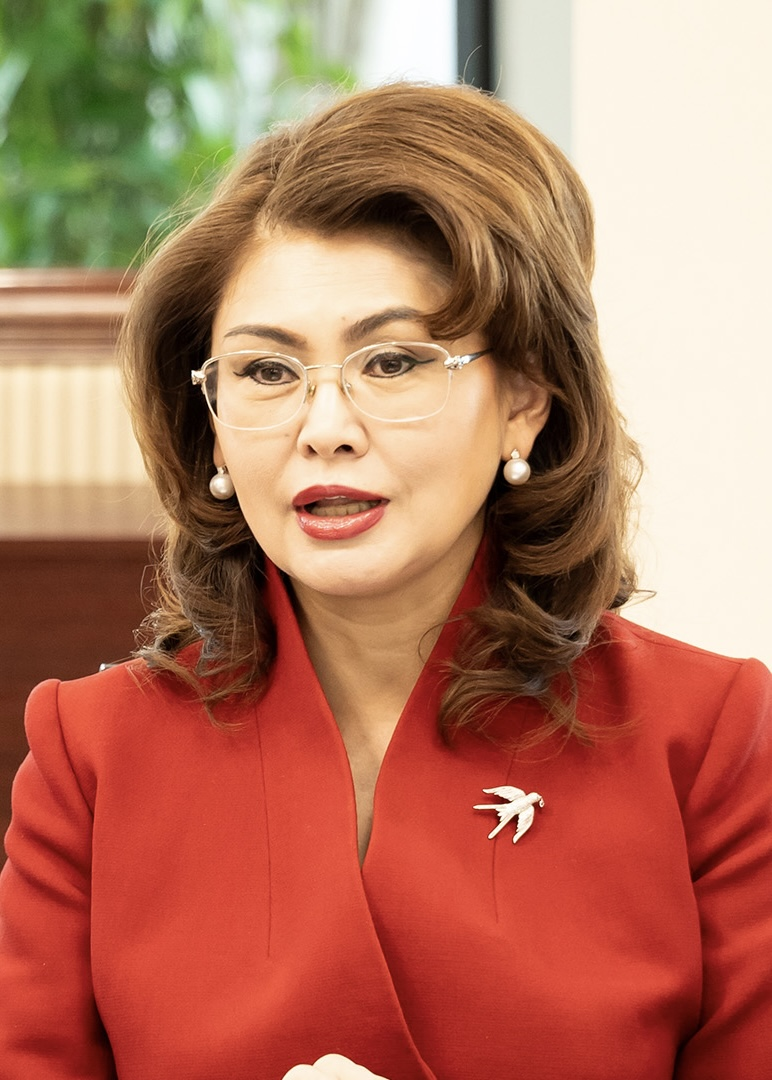
- Balayeva in 2026

Deputy Chairwoman of the Security Council of Kazakhstan
- Incumbent
- Assumed office 31 August 2026
- Chairman: Kassym-Jomart Tokayev
- Preceded by: Office established; Gizat Nurdauletov as the Secretary of Security Council

Deputy Prime Minister
- In office 1 December 2025 – 28 August 2026
- President: Kassym-Jomart Tokayev
- Prime Minister: Oljas Bektenov
- Preceded by: Ermek Köşerbaev

Minister of Culture and Information
- In office 2 September 2023 – 28 August 2026
- President: Kassym-Jomart Tokayev
- Prime Minister: Älihan Smaiylov; Oljas Bektenov
- Preceded by: Ashat Oralov
- Succeeded by: Arman Qyryqbaev

Minister of Information and Social Development
- In office 4 May 2020 – 5 January 2022
- President: Kassym-Jomart Tokayev
- Prime Minister: Asqar Mamin; Älihan Smaiylov
- Preceded by: Dauren Abaev
- Succeeded by: Asqar Omarov

Personal details
- Born: 4 July 1974 (age 52) Jambyl, Jambyl District, Almaty Region, Kazakh SSR, Soviet Union
- Other political affiliations: Amanat (2019–2026)
- Spouse: Adilbek Djusupov
- Children: 3
- Education: Abai Kazakh National Pedagogical University; Kazakh National Agrarian University
- Awards: Order of Kurmet, Order of Parasat, Order of the Leopard

Aida Ğalymqyzy Balaeva (Note: Often transliterated as Aida Galymovna Balayeva through a Russified Romanization of Аида Галымовна Балаева.) (Note: Kazakh: Аида Ғалымқызы Балаева, [ɐˈjɪdə ɣɑˈɫɯmqɯzɯ bɑˈɫɑjɯβɑ]) (born 4 July 1974) is a Kazakh politician serving as the Deputy Chairwoman of the Security Council of Kassym-Jomart Tokayev. Previously, she was Minister of Culture and Information from 2023 to 2026 and Deputy Prime Minister from 2025 to 2026.

== Biography ==
Balayeva was born in Jambyl, Kazakh SSR. She graduated from the Abai Kazakh National Pedagogical University in 2000 with a degree in Russian language and Russian literature, and then the Kazakh National Agrarian University in 2007 with a degree in law. In 2010, she defended her academic title with a candidate of sociological sciences, the topic of the dissertation: “Ethno-religious identification of the youth of Kazakhstan: sociological aspect.”

From 1994 to 2004, Balayeva served a leading specialist in the department of analysis and coordination of socio-political processes of the Almaty Regional Information and Public Accord Department of the Ministry of Information and Public Accord as the acting head of the information department.

From 2004 to 2006, Balayeva was the First Deputy Director of the Department of Internal Policy, then from 2006 to 2008, Balaeva was the Director of the Department of Internal Policy.

From 2008 to 2010, she served the Director of the Department of Internal Politics of Astana. From February 2010 to December 2014, she was the deputy akim of Astana.

From 30 December 2014 to July 2019, she served as the Head of the Department of Internal Policy of the Presidential Administration of Kazakhstan.

On 22 July 2019, Balayeva was appointed as the Assistant to the President of Kazakhstan as the Head of the Division for Monitoring the Consideration of Appeals.

From 4 May 2020 to 11 January 2022, Balayeva served as the Minister of Information and Social Development of Kazakhstan.

Since 2 September 2023, Balayeva has been serving as the Minister of Culture and Information of Kazakhstan. On 1 December 2025, Balayeva was appointed as Deputy Prime Minister of Kazakhstan, in addition to her role as Minister of Culture and Information.
