= 2016 Kazakh anti-land reform protests =

- Part of Kazakh opposition
- Date: 24 April – 21 May 2016
- Location: Kazakhstan
- Caused by: Amendments to the Land Code; Economic hardships
- Goals: Ban on the sale of land to foreigners; Improvements to living standards
- Methods: Demonstrations; Online activism
- Result: Amendment moratorium to the Land Code; Resignation of the Minister of National Economy Erbolat Dosaev; Resignation of the Minister of Agriculture Asyljan Mamytbekov; Establishment of the Ministry of Information and Communications; Creation of a Land Commission

Parties
| Protesters | (Kazakhstan) Kazakh Government: Ministry of National Economy; Ministry of Internal Affairs; National Security Committee |

Lead figures
| (no centralised leadership); Maks Bokaev; Talgat Ayan; Dmitriy Tanatarov (leader of Islamic extremists in 2016 Aktobe shootings) | (Kazakhstan) Nursultan Nazarbayev (Kazakhstan) Erbolat Dosaev; Kalmukhanbet Kassymov; Vladimir Zhumakanov |

Casualties and losses
| 18 Rebels during 2016 Aktobe shootings | 3 Soldiers During 2016 Aktobe shootings |

Casualties
- Deaths: 25
- Injuries: +40

The 2016 Kazakh anti-land reform protests were a nationwide series of public demonstrations in Kazakhstan, primarily sparked by controversial amendments to the Land Code that would have permitted the sale and lease of agricultural land to foreigners. The protests began on 24 April 2016 in the western city of Atyrau and quickly spread to Kazakh cities such as Aktobe, Semey, and Almaty, marking the country’s largest wave of demonstrations since the Zhanaozen massacre of 2011.

The protests were driven by fears over national sovereignty, particularly the concern that Kazakhstan’s vast farmland could be acquired by foreign interests—especially Chinese investors. Broader frustrations also emerged, including corruption, social inequality, and the lack of political freedoms. The demonstrations were largely spontaneous and leaderless, though several activists and civil society groups played a visible role in organizing local gatherings.

The initial government response, under President Nursultan Nazarbayev, was relatively restrained. However, following continued unrest and public outcry, Minister of National Economy Erbolat Dosaev, who had helped develop the reforms, resigned on 5 May 2016. Soon after, Agriculture Minister Asyljan Mamytbekov also stepped down on 6 May. In a bid to calm public anger, Nazarbayev imposed a moratorium on the contentious land law provisions, later extending to five-years and formed a Land Reform Commission to reassess the issue.

Despite these concessions, tensions remained high. Ahead of a planned national day of protest on 21 May 2016, the government preemptively cracked down on organizers and participants. Hundreds of people were detained, and internet access to key platforms—including Facebook, WhatsApp, VKontakte, and Periscope—was partially or fully blocked in several regions. Prominent civic figures Maks Bokaev and Talgat Ayan were later sentenced to five years in prison in November 2016. Nazarbayev framed the protests as a potential "color revolution" instigated by foreign actors, reinforcing the state's crackdown narrative.

Although the protests did not escalate into broader political upheaval, they exposed deep-seated public grievances and signaled rising civic consciousness. The events prompted the creation of a Ministry of Information and Communications to better manage state messaging, reflecting official concern over the growing power of digital platforms in mobilizing dissent.

== Background ==
On 30 March 2016, Minister of National Economy, Erbolat Dosaev, announced that starting from 1 July, 1.7 million hectares of agricultural land would be put up for auction. This initially caused discontent on social networks, which turned into calls for protests. According to some Kazakh journalists, the boiling point was not the amendments to the Land Code, but the country's difficult economic situation due to declining oil prices and the devaluation of the tenge despite promises by President Nursultan Nazarbayev to fix the problems. On 11 April, a petition letter was sent to Nazarbayev and the authorities. The text of the letter appeared in the Kazakh media and on some websites. The letter said that "more than 50 thousand signatures have already been collected in the regions". “If the land is leased or sold to foreigners, then the people will go to extraordinary measures”. Among the signatories of the petition were Abdijamil Nurpeisov, a writer, Murat Auezov, a culturologist, Murat Kalmataev, retired general, Abugali Kaydarov, academician, and Mels Eleusizov, an ecologist.

On 20 April, in Astana, civil activist Galymbek Akulbekov held a single picket against the sale of land to foreigners, but he was soon detained by police. On 22 April, in Almaty, around three dozen group of citizens called for the permission of the rally to be held on 21 May.

== Chronology ==
On 24 April, a first mass rally was held in the center of Atyrau against the sale of land to foreigners, where around 700 to 4000 people gathered. On the same day, in Oral, on Abai Square, a single picket was launched by Isatay Utepov, who was holding the poster “Қытайға жер сатпа!!!”, meaning (“Do not sell land to China!!!”).

On 27 April, in the cities of Aktobe and Semey, with the participation of hundreds of people, rallies were held against changes in the land code of Kazakhstan and against plans by the authorities to sell agricultural land.

On 28 April, several dozen people gathered in Aktau in the central square, but the police did not allow the rally to be held, citing that the square was necessary to prepare for the holiday of the Unity of the People.

On 29 April, authorities in Astana and Almaty did not allow public figures to hold a press conference "on the land issue." In Astana, the hotel at the last moment refused to rent premises to activists due to pressure from the KNB. In Almaty, the police managed to detain all activists before the event. In Oral, an activist Bauyrjan Alipkaliev was detained by police, who was going to hold a single picket that day.

On 1 May, on the Day of Unity of the People, protests were held in Zhanaozen, where around hundred people gathered. In the city of Kyzylorda, the security forces dispersed protesters from the square.

On May 4, a spontaneous rally was held in the central square of Oral with the participation of several dozen people. As in previous protests in other cities of Kazakhstan, the protesters opposed the transfer of agricultural land for a long-term rent to foreigners.

On 5 May, Nazarbayev announced a moratorium on some provisions of the Land Code. Vice-Minister of National Economy Kairat Uskenbaev was dismissed, Dosaev himself resigned from office on his own, and Minister of Agriculture Asyljan Mamytbekov was reprimanded, but the next day he also resigned. In addition, Nazarbayev ordered the creation of a new Ministry of Information and Communication, which would monitor the information space and develop the state's information policy.

On 21 May, rallies were planned throughout Kazakhstan. The authorities rejected permissions for rallies to be held in the cities of Almaty, Astana, Oral and Semey. On this day, law enforcement authorities detained dozens of activists, as well as journalists in several cities of the country. Attempts to hold unsanctioned rallies were recorded in the cities of Aktobe, Atyrau, and Pavlodar, where a small number of citizens gathered and after warning about the illegality of the rally, a group of people obediently left the embankment of the Irtysh river, and the organizer Serikbay Alibaev was fined 50 MCI.

== Reactions by authorities ==
After a rally in Atyrau at a session of the People's Assembly, Nazarbayev expressed his vision of the land issue and stated that it was necessary to find and punish all the instigators of misinformation about the issue. However, later on 5 May, he had accused the officials of the relevant ministries of the lack of land reform.

In some Kazakh cities, Day of Unity of the Peoples celebrations were cancelled. In Karaganda, the reason for the rejection of the processions was due to weather conditions by the Deputy Akim, Nurlan Aubakirov. In Temirtau, according to the Deputy Head of the city, Galymzhan Spabekov, was in order not to block the public transport in the city along the main streets. The authorities of Aktau did not give a reason for the cancellation.

On 29 April 2016 Nazarbayev, after the exercises of special forces (“Sunkar” of the Ministry of Internal Affairs, “Arlan” of the Department of Internal Affairs of the city of Almaty, the “Golden Eagle” of the National Guard and others) in the Almaty Region, emphasized that “the Motherland entrusted you with a matter of special importance - vigilantly guard the interests of the state, be a reliable guarantor of national security and internal stability of the Republic of Kazakhstan. This requires not only high training, but also dedication, sincere patriotism".

Some Kazakh officials and pro-government media have suggested that the unrest was triggered and financed by foreign nations, although no evidence was provided.

On 1 May, President Nazarbayev spoke in Almaty with a festive speech, that without unity and stability, a political crisis similar to the Ukrainian one would be expected.

Before the nationwide protests scheduled for May 21, the authorities did allow permissions in any city, and law enforcement agencies began arresting suspects in organizing and inciting unauthorized rallies. As of May 20, more than a dozen people received sentences of 10 to 15 days of administrative arrest for violating the law on peaceful assembly.

In the early morning of May 20, popular social networks like VKontakte, Facebook, Twitter, and instant messengers such as WhatsApp, Viber, as well as YouTube were inaccessible throughout Kazakhstan. This was confirmed by residents of several regions of the country. The incident was connected with the upcoming calls to rallies on 21 May. However, the authorities denied the fact of “blocking” and that the issues were caused by “technical problems".

== Media coverage ==
Most of the Kazakh media since the beginning of the protests did not cover the events, only after a while, a sparse information was given which was distributed mainly through social media. Some opposition websites were also actively reporting on the events, but they were generally not available in Kazakhstan.

According to AsiaTerra, in Uzbekistan, on the website of the Russian BBC service, the section "Editor's Choice" was blocked, where an article about the events in Kazakhstan was published.

On April 29, a coverage was shown on the First Channel, which stated that the organizers of the protests received monetary rewards in the amount of 50 to 150 dollars from foreign nations to each person who came to the rally. Two weeks later, another story came out about the evidence of the paid-up mass protests. After the broadcasts, social networks immediately responded, pointing to a weak evidence base of stories and the propaganda nature of the programs.
