= Shal, ket! =

Kazakh anti-Nursultan Nazarbayev slogan

"Şal, ket!" (Kazakh: Шал, кет!) (Note: Often transliterated as Shal, ket! through a Russified Romanization of Шал, кет!.) was a Kazakh political slogan used against President of Kazakhstan Nursultan Nazarbayev. Speculated as originating in around 2006, it translates from Kazakh as "Old man, leave!".

== History ==
=== Origins ===
Journalist Daniar Moldabekov reports that the term was initially coined as "Nazarbayev, leave!" (Kazakh: Назарбаев, кет!) by Alibek Jumabaev of the For a Just Kazakhstan electoral alliance, who was jailed for the phrase and unrest in 2006.

The phrase in its popular form is widely known as being originated by Ermek Narymbai, who is sometimes credited for its original form as well. Narymbai claimed to have said the phrase back in 2010. Vladimir Kozlov of the Alga! movement claimed the phrase was much older.

Zhanar Sekerbayeva also claims to be the originator of the current phrase, though credits Narymbai as the original version's creator. Thus, its origins are disputed.

=== 2022 Kazakh unrest ===
The phrase continued to be used even after the resignation of Nursultan Nazarbayev and the beginning of the presidency of Kassym-Jomart Tokayev, as Nazarbayev continued to have political power in the country.

"Old man, leave!" was a notable component of the anti-government 2022 Kazakh unrest. This was noted in foreign media as well, like The Guardian, Foreign Affairs, and the Carnegie Endowment for International Peace.
