= 2016 Aktobe shootings =

Terrorist attacks in Aktobe, Kazakhstan

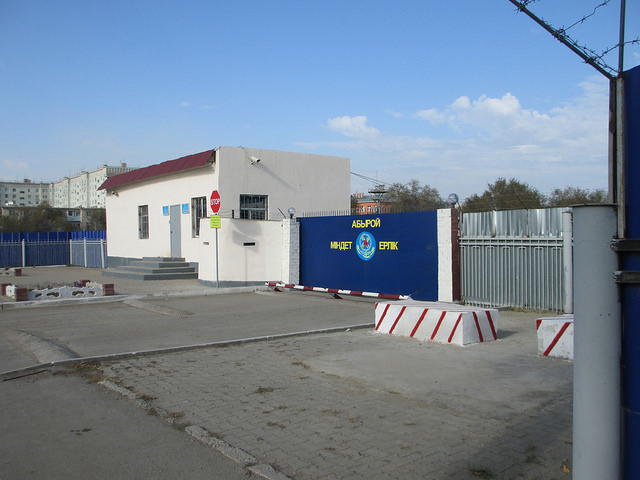
- An area where the shootings happened
- Location: Aktobe, Kazakhstan
- Date: 5–10 June 2016
- Target: Two gun shops, military base and police
- Attack type: Spree shooting, robbery, hijacking, shootout
- Deaths: 25+ (4 Civillians + 3 soldiers + 18 terrorists)
- Injuries: 40+
- Perpetrator: Islamic extremists
- Motive: Anti-police sentiment, Retaliation for 2011 Law On Religious Activities and Religious Associations, Anti-government sentiment, Islamic extremism

The 2016 Aktobe shootings were a series of shootings on civilian and military targets in Aktobe, Kazakhstan, in June 2016. On 5 June, two attacks occurred at gun stores, while a third attack was aimed at a military unit. Multiple shootouts between terrorists and police occurred over the next few days. The shootings left 7 victims dead and 37 injured, including 6 who died in hospital. Eighteen attackers were killed and nine were arrested.

== Background ==
Terrorism and extremism are rare in Kazakhstan, however, Aktobe had been the site of Kazakhstan's first suicide bombing, in 2011.

Despite the fact that Kazakhstan had been usually peaceful, the recent plunge in petroleum prices, Kazakhstan's main export, had threatened stability in the country, as was evidenced by a number of protests in April and May 2016. Recent laws allowing foreigners to purchase land in Kazakhstan had also caused an uproar.

== Shootings ==
=== Initial shootings ===
The group that committed the attacks, which numbered to at least 27 people, first robbed two gun shops early on 5 June, killing a guard and clerk at one shop and killing a customer at the other. They also wounded three policemen before three of the attackers were killed. The surviving attackers then hijacked a bus and rammed open a gate to a national guard base where they killed three servicemen and wounded nine before one attacker was killed.

=== Later shootings ===
The following night after the first shootings, five more militants were killed in gun battles with police and two were arrested. More police officers were reported to have been killed or injured during the firefights.

Early on 10 June, five militants were killed and two policemen were wounded in more gun battles in Aktobe.

== Responsibility ==
The perpetrators of the shootings have been described by the police press service as "followers of radical, non-traditional religious movements", a term that usually refers to Islamic extremists in Kazakhstan.

On 10 June, Kazakhstan's president Nursultan Nazarbayev told his Security Council the attackers were Salafists and probably included Islamic State militants who had returned to Kazakhstan from Syria.

== Reactions ==
Nazarbayev declared 9 June a national day of mourning. He also noted that the attacks occurred on the eve of Ramadan and claimed that they were ordered from abroad. He also suggested that the attacks were an attempt to start a "colour revolution" in Kazakhstan. Nazarbayev also called for harsher criminal penalties on Kazakhs who joined militant groups, tighter security at gun shops and military installations and for stricter migration control.

Some observers have seen the attacks as evidence of rising tensions between different political groups. Others stated the attacks showed a weakening in president Nazarbayev's control of the country.
