= Aslan Särınjıpov =

Kazakh politician and economist (born 1974)

- Аслан Сәрінжіпов

Minister of Education and Science
- In office 2 September 2013 – 10 February 2016
- President: Nursultan Nazarbayev
- Prime Minister: Serik Akhmetov; Karim Massimov
- Preceded by: Bakhytzhan Zhumagulov
- Succeeded by: Erlan Sağadiev

Personal details
- Born: 17 April 1974 (age 52) Kazakh SSR, Soviet Union
- Spouse: Anara Särınjıpova
- Children: 5
- Education: Narxoz University; University of Oklahoma; Diplomatic Academy of Vienna; University of Pennsylvania

Aslan Bäkenūly Särınjıpov (Kazakh: Аслан Бәкенұлы Сәрінжіпов; born 17 April 1974) is a Kazakh politician and economist who served as Minister of Education and Science from 2 September 2013 to 10 February 2016. He is the founder and head of the educational cluster of Nazarbayev University.

== Biography ==
=== Early life and education ===
Born in Kazakh SSR, Särınjıpov studied at the University of Oklahoma and Narxoz University where he earned his degree in economics in 1996 and the Diplomatic Academy of Vienna in 1997. He was an intern at the Harvard Kennedy School. Särınjıpov is an international economist, candidate of economic sciences, and has a doctorate in higher education administration from the University of Pennsylvania.

=== Career ===
Särınjıpov served as an assistant to the Executive Committee of the Interstate Council of Central Asia from 1996. In 1997, he moved to the central office of the Ministry of Foreign Affairs where he worked as an office employee. From 1998 to 2002, he was an attaché for Economic Affairs at the Kazakh Embassy in Washington, D.C. until becoming the coordinator of the World Bank projects in Central Asia in the field of infrastructure, financial markets and education, where he participated in the development of the State Program for the Development of Education in Kazakhstan. In 2007, Särınjıpov became the deputy chairman of the Board of JSC National Analytical Center under the Kazakh Government and the National Bank of Kazakhstan, overseeing the issues of economic development, finance and education. From 2009, he served as chairman of the Executive Board of the autonomous organization of Nazarbayev University and was associate professor at the School of Education at the faculty.

On 2 September 2013, by the Presidential Decree, Särınjıpov was appointed as Minister of Education and Science, succeeding Bakhytzhan Zhumagulov after series of scandals regarding Zhumagulov's dissertations. He served the post until being dismissed on 10 February 2016. The following day on 11 February, it was revealed that Särınjıpov became the head of the Nazarbayev Fund and a member of the Board of Trustees of Nazarbayev University.
