= Besqaynar =

Besqaynar Бесқайнар
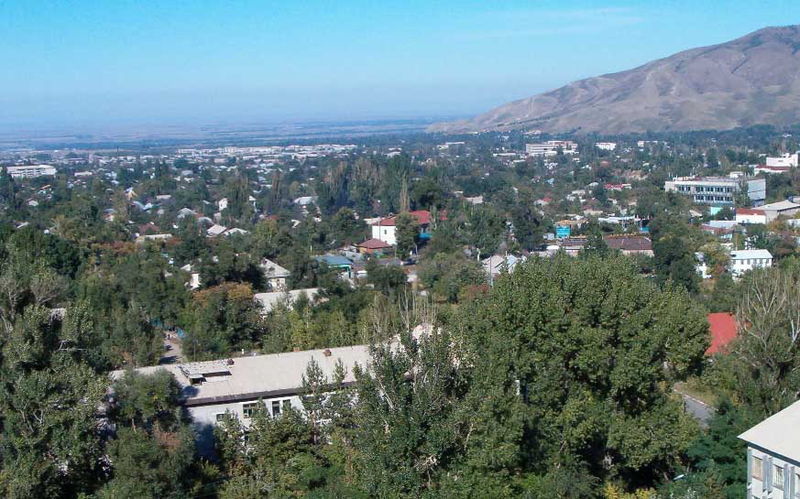

- Location in Kazakhstan
- Coordinates: 43°12′N 77°06′E
- Country: Kazakhstan
- Region: Almaty Region
- First settled: IX
- Founded: 1858
- Incorporated: 1959

Government
  - Akim (mayor): Meirzhan A.B.

Area
  - Total: 18.8 km^{2} (7.3 sq mi)
- Elevation: 1,500 m (4,900 ft)

Population (2009)
  - Total: 2,008
- Time zone: UTC+6 (UTC)
- Postal code: 041601 (town)
- Area code: +7 72774

Besqaynar (Kazakh: Бесқайнар, Besqainar) is a town in Almaty Region, southeastern Kazakhstan. The town is located between Almaty and Talgar, 25 km from Almaty and several kilometres east of Talgar.

== Name ==
The population of the town is about 3,000 people. The town possesses several tourist attractions such as Alma-Tau and Tabogan .

The town is located 1,500 metres above sea level. Ski resort «Qaimar» was promised to be opened by the end of 2012.
