= Erlan Sağadiev =

Kazakh politician and economist (born 1966)

Erlan Sagadiev
- Ерлан Сағадиев
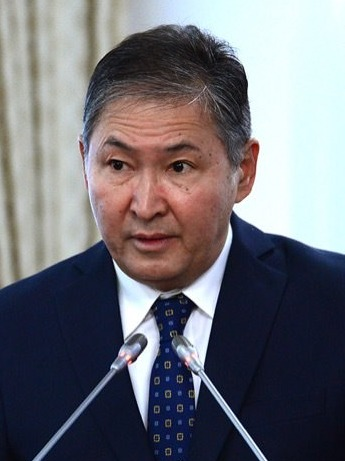
- Sağadiev in 2017

Minister of Education and Science
- In office 10 February 2016 – 25 February 2019
- President: Nursultan Nazarbayev
- Prime Minister: Karim Massimov; Bakhytzhan Sagintayev; Askar Mamin (Acting)
- Preceded by: Aslan Särınjıpov
- Succeeded by: Kulash Shamshidinova

Personal details
- Born: 29 September 1966 (age 60) Kazakh SSR, Soviet Union
- Education: Al-Farabi Kazakh National University; University of Minnesota

Erlan Kenjeğaliūly Sağadiev (Note: Often transliterated as Yerlan Kenzhegaliyevich Sagadiyev through the Russified Romanization of Russian: Ерлан Кенжегалиевич Сагадиев) (Kazakh: Ерлан Кенжеғалиұлы Сағадиев; born 29 September 1966) is a Kazakh politician and economist who served as a Minister of Education and Science from 10 February 2016 to 25 February 2019. Prior to that, he was the president of the University of International Business and the International University of Information Technology and worked in several business organizations.

== Biography ==
=== Early life and education ===
Born in 1966, Sagadiev graduated from the Al-Farabi Kazakh National University in 1990 with a degree in economics then in 1993 from the University of Minnesota in Minneapolis earning masters in science.

=== Business career ===
Sagadiev began his career in 1990 as a second secretary for the Development of International Economic Relations of the Department of Applied Economics under the Ministry of Foreign Affairs. In 1992, he began working in Washington, D.C. as an analysis of the state of agriculture at the Department of the World Bank, curator of the countries of Eastern Europe and CIS. From 1993 to 1994, he led a technological marketing project at the Developed Technology Resources in Minneapolis.

From 1995 to 2004, he was the founder and President of FoodMaster Company, which became a leading dairy company in Kazakhstan, Ukraine, and Moldova. In 2003, Sagadiev became the chairman of the Board of Directors of JSC New Technologies Kazakhstan where he was the general director until 2009. From 2004, Sagadiev was the President of the University of International Business (Almaty). While working there, he also served as an independent director of Government Investment Fund JSC in 2008–2009. In 2009, he was appointed as chairman of the Board of Directors of Frontier Mining Ltd. He is also a founder and first President of the International University of Information Technologies, in a leading IT University in Almaty.

=== Political career ===
From 2012 to 2013, Sagadiev was the advisor to the Prime Minister of Kazakhstan. On 7 February 2014, he was appointed as a Vice Minister of Industry and New Technologies where he served the post until 13 August 2014, when Sağadiev was transferred the post of Vice Minister for Investments and Development continuing to work in the government until he left on 10 July 2015.

Sagadiev returned to work on 10 February 2016, when by the Decree of President Nursultan Nazarbayev, he was appointed as Minister of Education and Science.

On 25 February 2019, Sagadiev was removed from the post as Education and Science Minister along with the entire cabinet following resignation of Prime Minister Bakhytzhan Sagintayev on 21 February. He was succeeded that day by Kulash Shamshidinova. After stepping down from the Ministry, Sağadiev joined Harvard University Advanced Leadership Initiative program in 2019.

== Awards ==
- Order of Kurmet (2017)
- Anniversary medal "20 years of City of Astana" (2018)
