= Ministry of Information and Communications (Kazakhstan) =

Government ministry of Kazakhstan

Ministry of Information and Communications of the Republic of Kazakhstan
- Байланыс және ақпарат министрлігі
- Emblem of Kazakhstan

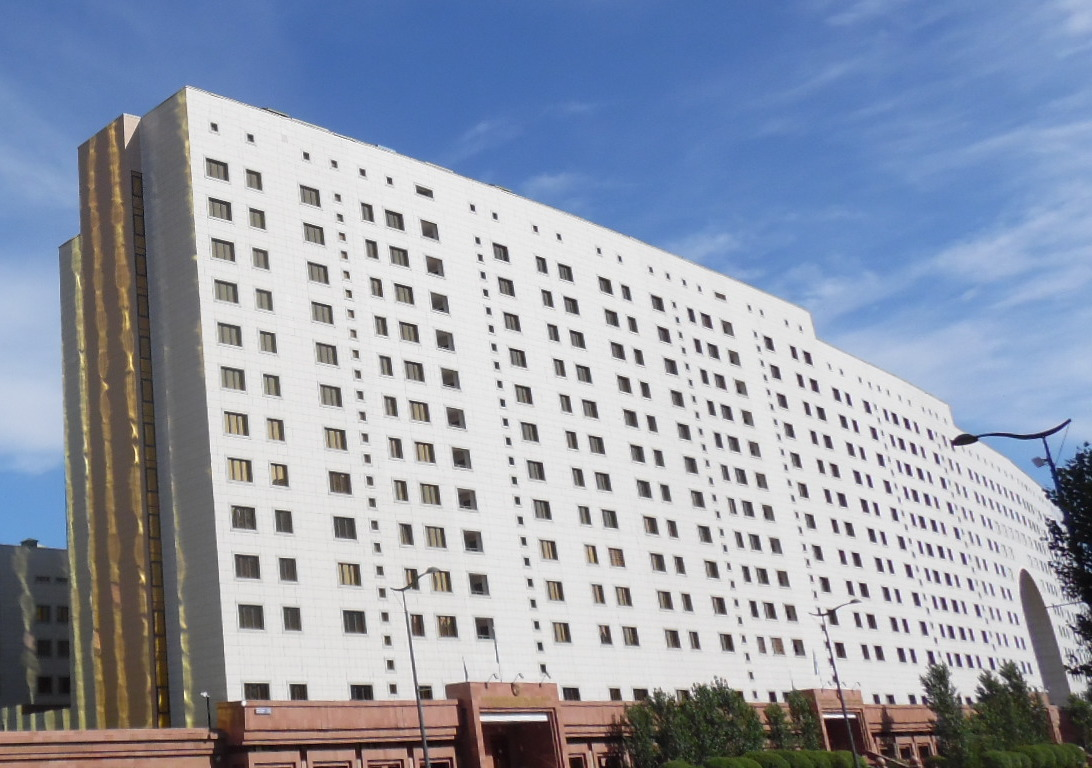
- House of Ministries

Agency overview
- Formed: 6 May 2016
- Dissolved: 25 February 2019
- Superseding agency: Ministry of Information and Social Development
- Jurisdiction: Government of Kazakhstan
- Headquarters: Nur-Sultan, Kazakhstan

The Ministry of Information and Communications of the Republic of Kazakhstan (MIC RK, Kazakh: Қазақстан Республикасы Ақпарат және коммуникациялар министрлігі, romanized: Qazaqstan Respublikasy Aqparat jäne kommunikatsiialar ministrlıgı, ҚР АКМ; Russian: Министерства информации и коммуникаций Республики Казахстан, МИК РК) was a central executive body of the Government of Kazakhstan. On 5 May 2016, President Nursultan Nazarbayev ordered the creation of the new Ministry in response to the 2016 Kazakh protests which was established the following day on 6 May. The Ministry was headed by Presidential Press Secretary Dauren Abaev. The head of the department was introduced to the team by the Prime Minister Karim Massimov.

The Ministry was dissolved on 25 February 2019, and all its functions were transferred to the Ministry of Information and Social Development.

== History ==
On May 5, 2016, President Nazarbayev instructed to create the Ministry of Information and Communications.

The ministry was created the next day, on May 6. The ministry was headed by the press secretary of President Abaev Dauren, who was introduced to the team of Prime Minister RK Karim Masimov.
