= Tuzdybastau =

Tuzdybastau Тұздыбастау
- Village
- Location in Kazakhstan
- Coordinates: 43°19′08″N 77°03′34″E
- Country: Kazakhstan
- Region: Almaty
- District: Talgar

Population (2021 census)
  - Total: 21,693
- Time zone: UTC+6 (Almaty)

Tuzdybastau (Kazakh: Тұздыбастау) is a village in the Talgar District of the Almaty Region of Kazakhstan. It is located about 14 km west of the town of Talgar.

== Population ==
In 1999, the population of the village was 9,182 people. According to the 2009 census, 12,577 people lived in the village.
