= Asyljan Mamytbekov =

Kazakh politician (born 1968)

- Асылжан Мамытбеков
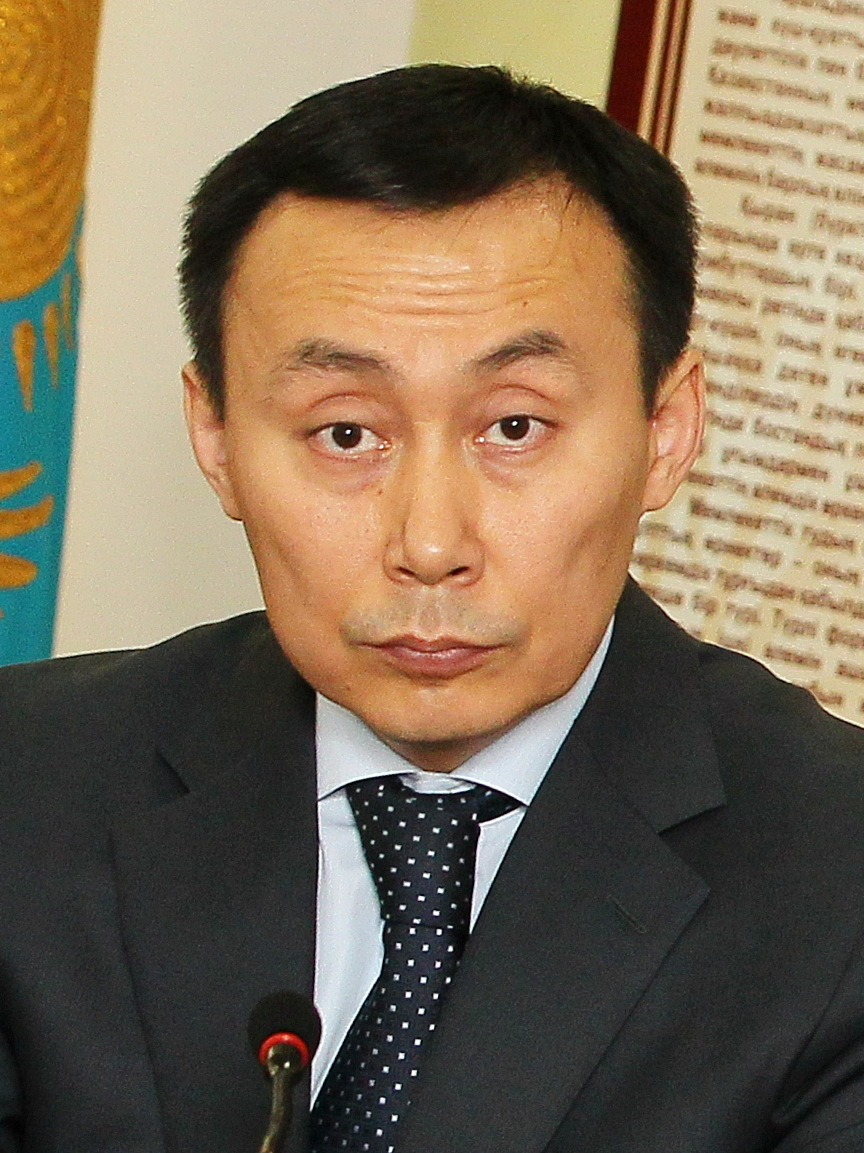
- Mamytbekov in 2016

Minister of Agriculture
- In office 11 April 2011 – 6 May 2016
- President: Nursultan Nazarbayev
- Prime Minister: Karim Massimov; Serik Akhmetov
- Preceded by: Ahylbek Kurishbaev
- Succeeded by: Askar Myrzakhmetov

Personal details
- Born: 17 September 1968 (age 58) Chimkent, Kazakh SSR, Soviet Union
- Spouse: Almagül Japparova
- Children: 3
- Education: Al-Farabi Kazakh National University; Narxoz University

Asyljan Sarybaiuly Mamytbekov (Kazakh: Асылжан Сарыбайұлы Мамытбеков, Asyljan Sarybaiūly Mamytbekov; born 17 September 1968) is a Kazakh politician who's served as the executive secretary of the Ministry of Agriculture from May 2018 to March 2019. Prior to that, he was the Minister of Agriculture from April 2011 until his resignation in May 2016 as a result of protests against land reforms in Kazakhstan.

== Biography ==
=== Early life and education ===
Mamytbekov was born in the city of Chimkent (now Shymkent) in 1968. In 1992, he finished the Al-Farabi Kazakh National University where he earned a degree in law. In 1996, Mamytbekov graduated from the Narxoz University with a degree in economics.

=== Career ===
From 1992, he was a junior research fellow at the Institute of State and Law of the Academy of Sciences of the Republic of Kazakhstan. In 1998, Mamytbekov became the deputy chairman of the Land Management Committee and from 1999, he was the deputy head of the Kostanay Regional Financial Department until he was appointed as the head of the Kostanay Regional Department of the Treasury in 2000.

From 2003 to 2007, Mamytbekov worked as deputy äkim of Kostanay Region, Astana, and then South Kazakhstan Region. He was then appointed as the deputy head of the Prime Minister's Office. From November 2008 to 2011, he was the chairman of the Board of JSC National Managing Holding KazAgro. On 11 April 2011, Mamytbekov was appointed as Minister of Agriculture. He worked in the position for five years until he resigned due to result of unrest regarding the land issue and the announcement by President Nursultan Nazarbayev of his incomplete official compliance.

After serving as Minister, Mamytbekov became the independent director of Bank Astana JSC on 6 June 2016 and in January 2018, he was appointed as chairman of the Meat Union of Kazakhstan.

In May 2018, Mamytbekov returned to work in the Ministry of Agriculture as an executive secretary. He was relieved from his post on 6 March 2019.
