= Zhanar Sekerbayeva =

Kazakhstani LGBT activist (born c. 1983)

Janar Sekerbaeva
- Жанар Секербаева
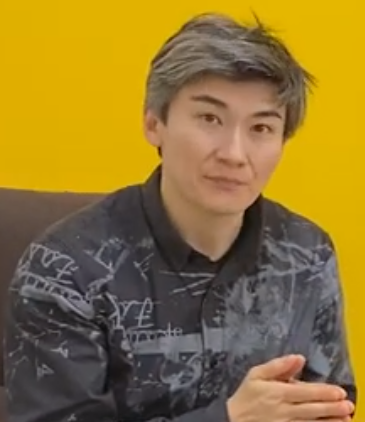
- In a UNOHCHR video in 2022
- Born: 1982 or 1983 (age 43–44)
- Known for: Feminita human rights group creation
- Criminal charges: article 378 "Insulting a government official"

Janar Sekerbaeva (Note: Often transliterated as Zhanar Sekerbayeva through a Russified Romanization of Жанар Секербаева.) (Kazakh: Жанар Секербаева, [ʐɑˈnɑr sʲekʲerˈbɑjɯvɐ]; born c. 1983) is a Kazakh human rights activist, poet, and journalist. The co-founder of the LGBT women's rights group Feminita, her activism has led to a campaign of harassment and disruption against her, culminating with her being assaulted and arrested in 2021.

== Early life and education ==
Sekerbayeva was born and raised in Kazakhstan, the daughter of a paediatrician. After graduating with degrees from L. N. Gumilev Eurasion National University in Astana, Kazakhstan, Moscow State University in Moscow, Russia, and the European Humanities University in Vilnius, Lithuania, she earned a PhD in social sciences from the University of Tsukuba in Tsukuba, Japan.

== Activism ==
Sekerbayeva has said that the traditional Kazakhstani culture found in the steppes had been tolerant of people who were different, such as those who refused to marry or lived life as a different gender, citing the difficult life in the steppes helped people negotiate and find commonality among one another so that they could live and work together. She believes that this has been lost as more Kazakhstani people move to the cities.

=== Early activism ===
Sekerbayeva was first inspired to become an activist after joining a protest against the devaluation of the tenge outside of a bank in Almaty in February 2014. Footage of the protesters, including Sekerbayeva, both during the protest and the subsequent crackdown on protesters by the police, were widely published in the Kazakhstani press; Sekerbayeva was erroneously identified as the male leader of the protest in many of these reports. Photos of Sekerbayeva holding a sign with the slogan shal, ket! (lit. 'old man, get out!') received particular attention; Sekerbayeva has since said that the slogan referred specifically to then-president Nursultan Nazarbayev, but also more generally to the "typical patriarchal figure in Kazakhstan... an old man who can't do anything".

=== Founding of Feminita (2014) ===
In 2014 Sekerbayeva, along fellow activist Gulzada Serzhan, founded the Kazakhstani Feminist Initiative "Feminita"; its first manifesto focused on advocating for the rights of LGBT women, as well as disabled women and sex workers. In 2017, Sekerbayeva and Serzhan were unsuccessful at registering Feminita as a legal entity; as of 2021, repeated attempts to do so have been rejected by the government, who have stated that the organisation does not align with its "spiritual and moral values".

=== Appearance at the United Nations Human Rights Committee (2016) ===
In June 2016, Sekerbayeva was part of a group that travelled to Geneva, Switzerland, during the 117th session of the United Nations Human Rights Committee, where she presented an alternative report on the violation of LGBT rights in Kazakhstan. She cited the ongoing use of "corrective rape" of lesbian women with the intention of "correcting" their sexuality and "instilling" love of the male body, as being endemic in the country.

=== Public protests and government challenges (2018–2019) ===
In August 2018, Sekerbayeva was arrested after taking part in a photoshoot in which she held artwork of a woman menstruating over yurts. She was charged with petty hooliganism and ordered to pay a fine. In 2019, Feminita was able to successfully challenge a bylaw that included a derogatory paragraph about LGBT people; the law was eventually passed with the bylaw omitted.

=== Women's March Almaty (March 2021) ===
On 8 March 2021, a march was held in Almaty, co-organised by Sekerbayeva, as part of the international Women's March movement. The march had been approved by the äkimdik of Almaty in what Radio Azzatyk called a "rarity". There was vocal opposition to the march; Aq Jol politician Kanybek Isa described the march as "demonic", while Aigul Orynbek from the National Council of Public Trust accused the march's organisers of confusing women's rights with "sexual desire".

Subsequent attempts to hold the march in 2022 and 2023 have been rejected by the Almaty äkimdik.

=== Disruption at conferences and online harassment (2021) ===
In May 2021, Sekerbayeva and Serzhan were verbally and physically assaulted by around thirty unknown men while speaking to a group at a café in Shymkent. They had been in the city to present at a conference that was cancelled at short notice following pressure from who Sekerbayeva described as "Kazakhstani men" both in Shymkent and online. That same month, Sekerbayeva's personal details, including her phone number, was posted on TikTok, leading to her being sent hundreds of threatening messages. In addition, influential conservative Kazakhstani figures including singer Altynay Zhorabayeva and Bagila Baltabaeva of the Kazakh Union of Parents called on their followers on social media to disrupt Feminita events.

Following the attack, Sekerbayeva and Serzhan were both detained by the police. Sekerbayeva subsequently reported that the police had not given her a reason for their detainment, and that she had received bruising due to the force used by police officers. Shymkent's police department released a statement stating that officers "took the necessary measures to ensure the safety of event organisations", though both Sekerbayeva and Serzhan were subsequently charged with "assaulting police representatives"; Sekerbayeva later reported she had been told the charge would be dropped if she agreed not to file a complaint against the officer who detained her.

In June 2021, Sekerbayeva and Serzhan again had difficulties organising a conference, this time in Karaganda, and received hostile opposition from male critics when the conference took place. Sekerbayeva believed that the difficulty she experienced stemmed from pressure from the Kazakhstani government for venues not to hold events promoting women's rights and LGBT rights.

=== Political campaigning (2023) ===
In February 2023, it was announced that Sekerbayeva was among fourteen members of Derbes Deputat, an alliance of independent candidates running for the Almaty City Mäslihat.
