= Kazakh National Conservatory =

Coordinates: 43°15′8.0″N 76°56′32.1″E

Kurmangazy Kazakh National Conservatory
- Құрманғазы атындағы Қазақ ұлттық консерваториясы
- Type: National
- Established: 1944
- Rector: Arman Judebaev
- Location: Abylai Khan Avenue, 86, Almaty, Kazakhstan

The Kurmangazy Kazakh National Conservatory (Kazakh: Құрманғазы атындағы Қазақ ұлттық консерваториясы, romanized: Qūrmanğazy atyndağy Qazaq ūlttyq konservatoriiasy) is a high musical institution in Kazakhstan which trains composers, musicologists, conductors of the choir and folk orchestras, pianists, vocalists, art managers, performers on all instruments of the symphony orchestra and folk instruments.

Many creative collectives of the country, educational institutions are staffed with graduates of the conservatory. Pupils of the conservatory work in professional collectives from near and far abroad such as in Russia, Germany, Greece, the Netherlands, Israel, USA, France, Czech Republic, Canada, Korea, China and others.

== History ==
On 24 July 1944, the Council of People's Commissars of the Kazakh SSR decided to organize from October 1 the State Institute of Arts in the city of Alma-Ata, which was later transformed into the Alma-Ata Conservatory. In 1945, the university was named after the Kazakh kuishi of the 19th century Kurmangazy Sagyrbaev. In the first building, built in 1938, before the conservatory there was a musical and choreographic combine.

In the early 1960s, another building and a dormitory with 120 living rooms, 42 rehearsals, reading and sports halls and a spacious hall was built.

In the 1981–1982 academic year, more than 1200 students studied at the conservatory, 234 teachers worked, including over 20 professors and doctors of sciences, about 50 associate professors and candidates of sciences, 5 people's artists of the Soviet Union, 7 people's artists of the Kazakh SSR.

In November 2000, the conservatory was provided with an additional modern 4-story building.

Since December 2013, the quarterly scientific journal “Bulletin of the Kurmangazy Kazakh National Conservatory". In March 2017, the magazine was renamed to "Saryn Art and Science Journal". In March 2023 the journal was renamed to "Saryn"

== Faculties and departments ==
The institution is provided by 4 faculties:

- Faculty of Vocal and Conducting
- Faculty of instrumental performance
- Faculty of Musicology and Management
- Folk Music Faculty

There are also a number of university-wide departments:

- Department of Innovative Musical and Pedagogical Technologies
- Department of Social and Humanitarian Disciplines
- Experimental Art Studio School
- Physical Education and Sports Section
- Section of Kazakh and foreign languages

== Rectors ==
- 1944-1945 - Ivan Kruglykhin
- 1945-1951 - Akhmet Zhubanov
- 1951-1957 - Ivan Kruglykhin
- 1957-1967 - Kuddus Kuzhamyarov
- 1967-1975 - Erkegali Rakhmadiyev
- 1975-1987 - Gaziza Zhubanova
- 1987-1997 - Dyusen Kaseinov
- 1997-2018 - Zhaniya Aubakirova
- 2018-present - Arman Zhudebayev

== Building architecture ==
The building is an example of the "national style" in 1930's Almaty architecture. The 3-story building of the conservatory is an open rectangle in the plan. The main facade of the building is accented by flanking projections with two-column Corinthian-style porticoes, completed with a triangular pediment, with the main entrance located in one of them. The measured rhythm of Corinthian pilasters in the space between windows dissects the facade vertically. The windows are three-part, in the end part of the risalits - double-leaf. The masonry of the walls is brick, plastered. The layout of the building is of a corridor type with rooms overlooking it.

=== Memorial status ===
On 10 November 2010, a new State List of Historical and Cultural Monuments of the Local Significance of the city of Almaty was approved, simultaneously with which all previous decisions on this matter were declared invalid. In this Resolution, the status of a local monument of the building of the Kazakh National Conservatory was preserved. The boundaries of the protected zones were approved in 2014.
