= Ministry of Economic Integration (Kazakhstan) =

Government ministry of Kazakhstan

Ministry of Economic Integration of the Republic of Kazakhstan
- Қазақстан Республикасы Экономикалық интеграция істері жөніндегі министрлігі (Kazakh); Министерство по делам экономической интеграции Республики Казахстан (Russian)
- Emblem of Kazakhstan

Agency overview
- Formed: 16 April 2011; 15 years ago
- Dissolved: 11 May 2016; 10 years ago
- Jurisdiction: Government of Kazakhstan
- Headquarters: Astana, Kazakhstan
- Agency executive: Zhanar Aitzhanova, Minister

The Ministry of Economic Integration of the Republic of Kazakhstan (MEI RK, Kazakh: Қазақстан Республикасы Экономикалық интеграция істері жөніндегі министрлігі, romanized: Qazaqstan Respwblïkası Ékonomïkalıq ïntegracïya isteri jönindegi mïnïstrligi, ҚР ЭИІСМ; Russian: Министерство по делам экономической интеграции Республики Казахстан, МДЭИ РК) was an agency in the Government of Kazakhstan that existed from 2011 to 2016.

The Ministry was formed on 16 April 2011 as a separate body of Ministry of Economic Development and Trade in order to strengthen the interests of Kazakhstan in international and regional economic integration. The Ministry of Economic Integration was led by Zhanar Aitzhanova until she was appointed as the Ambassador of Kazakhstan to Switzerland on 11 May 2016.
