= International Partnership for Human Rights =

- Founded: April 2008
- Type: Non-profit; NGO
- Purpose: Project development, international advocacy, research and publication
- Location: Belgium
- Field: human rights
- Website: www.IPHRonline.org

International Partnership for Human Rights (IPHR) is an international non-governmental human rights organization with its seat in Brussels, Belgium. It was established in the spring of 2008. It is a non-profit organization (NGO, registered with the Brussels Commercial Court as an association sans but lucratif, or (ASBL)).

The organization is independent and works with civil society organizations to document human rights violations, support vulnerable communities, and promote justice, accountability, and the rule of law, particularly in Central Asia, Eastern Europe, and the South Caucasus.

== Aims ==
IPHR's main aim is to empower local civil society groups promoting human rights in different countries and help them make their concerns heard at the international level. Working together with other human rights NGOs, IPHR acts to advance the rights of vulnerable communities, who are subject to discrimination and human rights abuses in different parts of the world, through monitoring, reporting, awareness-raising, capacity-building and national and international advocacy.

== History ==
IPHR was created in the spring of 2008 by a team of human rights practitioners who had previously worked together for the Vienna-based International Helsinki Federation. On August 13, 2021, the Russian Ministry of Justice added the partnership to the list of "undesirable organizations" in Russia.

The organization's investigative findings concerning have been cited by the Council of Europe's Commissioner for Human Rights in discussions of torture and mistreatment of prisoners of war and civilians. IPHR has received recognition from other international human rights organizations, including CIVICUS, which identifies IPHR as a core research partner of its CIVICUS Monitor initiative and credits its research partners with playing a vital role in maintaining accurate, current, and locally grounded human rights information. Partners in Justice International commended IPHR's survivor-centred approach to investigating systematic sexual violence in Ukraine, while the Unrepresented Nations and Peoples Organization described its monitoring of human rights violations in Russian-occupied Crimea as being of "extreme relevance".

Human rights advocate Shahindha Ismail, writing for the University of London's Institute of Commonwealth Studies, also positively assessed an IPHR initiative supporting exiled human rights defenders, describing its resulting collaborations as meaningful and the guidance developed by participants as invaluable. Representatives of the Russian human rights organization Memorial and Tajikistan's League of Women with Disabilities "Ishtirok" have credited IPHR with providing significant assistance in international advocacy and human rights documentation

== Activity ==
IPHR works together with human rights NGOs from different countries on project development and implementation, research and publication activities, as well as international advocacy (before the EU, Council of Europe, Organization for Security and Co-operation in Europe (OSCE), and United Nations). IPHR's cooperation with partner groups aims in particular at advancing the rights of vulnerable communities, such as ethnic and religious minorities; pro-democracy campaigners, civil society activists, NGO members and others who are subject to persecution. IPHR also offers consultation services to other NGOs.

IPHR currently carries out activities in relation to Central Asia, the South Caucasus, Russia, Belarus and other countries of the former Soviet Union. Its work has also extended to other regions of the world, including the Persian Gulf countries and the Middle East.

IPHR is a member of several civil society networks, including the Anna Lindh Euro-Mediterranean Foundation for the Dialogue Between Cultures, the Human Rights and Democracy Network , the EU Fundamental Rights Platform , the Civic Solidarity Platform and the EU-Russia Civil Society Forum.

== Publications ==
IPHR has published numerous statements, appeals, briefing papers and reports. Most of these have been issued together with partner NGOs from different countries. They are all available at the IPHR website.

A few examples of joint publications include:

- Civil Society appeal: Placing human rights at the heart of EU action in Central Asia
- Fundamental freedoms under serious threat in Central Asia twenty years after Soviet collapse
- Internet censorship and control in Central Asia
- Contribution to OSCE Review Meeting: Civil society under pressure in Central Asian countries

== Organisation ==
IPHR has three governing bodies: the General Meeting, the Board of Directors and the Director in charge of day-to-day management. The General Meeting is composed of all effective members. At least one meeting must be held annually to approve financial documents and appoint board members. The Board of Directors oversees the administration of the association and exercises all powers not expressly attributed to the General Meeting. It is composed of 3 to 9 members chosen among effective members; up to 1/3 of board members may be outside directors.

== Financing ==
IPHR finances its activities and projects through grants (from private and public donors, such as the European Commission) and fees. The organization also received sustained financial support from the Sigrid Rausing Trust between 2010 and 2025, totaling £924,766 in grants.
