= Zhanar Aitzhanova =

Kazakh politician (born 1965)

- Жанар Айтжанова
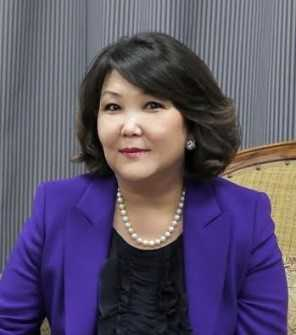
- Aitzhanova in 2016

Permanent Representative of Kazakhstan to the United Nations Office at Geneva
- Incumbent
- Assumed office June 2016
- President: Kassym-Jomart Tokayev

Minister of Economic Integration
- In office 16 April 2011 – 11 May 2016
- President: Nursultan Nazarbayev
- Prime Minister: Karim Massimov; Serik Akhmetov
- Preceded by: Office established
- Succeeded by: Office abolished

Minister of Economic Development and Trade
- In office 12 March 2010 – 8 April 2011
- President: Nursultan Nazarbayev
- Prime Minister: Karim Massimov
- Preceded by: Bakhyt Sultanov (Economy and Budget Planning)
- Succeeded by: Kairat Kelimbetov

Personal details
- Born: 9 May 1965 (age 60) State Farm "Juvan-Tyube", Suzak District, South Kazakhstan Region, Kazakh SSR, Soviet Union

Janar Seiıtahmetqyzy Aitjanova (Note: Often transliterated as Zhanar Seitakhmetqyzy Aitzhanova through a Russified Romanization of Жанар Сеитахметкызы Айжанова.) (Kazakh: Жанар Сейітахметқызы Айтжанова; born 9 May 1965) is a Kazakh diplomat, who's Permanent Representative of the Republic of Kazakhstan to the United Nations Office at Geneva. She holds the rank of Envoy Extraordinary and Plenipotentiary 1st Class.

== Early life and professional experience ==
She was born on 9 May 1965 on a sovkhoz in the South Kazakhstan Region of the Kazakh SSR. In 1982, at the age of 17, she enrolled in the Kazakh State University, graduating in 1988 with a diploma in History and the English Language. In 1989, she began her post-graduate research program at Moscow State University. In the early 90s, she continued her studies at the Charles University and the Central European University in Prague. From 1996 to 1997, she worked in the Executive Program in Economics and Public Finance at the Joint Vienna Institute. She earned her master's degree in 2003 from the Harvard Kennedy School of Government.

== Diplomatic and political career ==
From 1998 to 1999, she was the UNDP Assistant Resident Representative in Mongolia. In 2003, she became Deputy Minister of Industry and Trade, and in 2005, she became Special Representative of Kazakhstan at the World Trade Organization Accession Negotiations. From 2010 to 2016, she was Minister of Economic Development and Trade as well as Minister of Economic Integration. From June 2016 to September 2019, she served as Ambassador to the Swiss Confederation. In May 2017, she picked up the role of Kazakh envoy to the Vatican and to the Principality of Liechtenstein concurrently. Since June 2016, she has been the Permanent Representative to the United Nations Office and other International Organizations in Geneva.

== Personal life ==
She is married with two sons. Outside of Kazakh and Russian, she speaks English and Czech.

== Awards ==
- Order of Kurmet
- Medal "For Valiant Labor".
- Medal "For contribution to the creation of the Eurasian Economic Union" 1st Degree (May 13, 2015 by the Supreme Council of the Eurasian Economic Union)
