= Ministry of Culture (Kazakhstan) =

Government ministry of Kazakhstan

- Мәдениет министрлігі
- Emblem of Kazakhstan

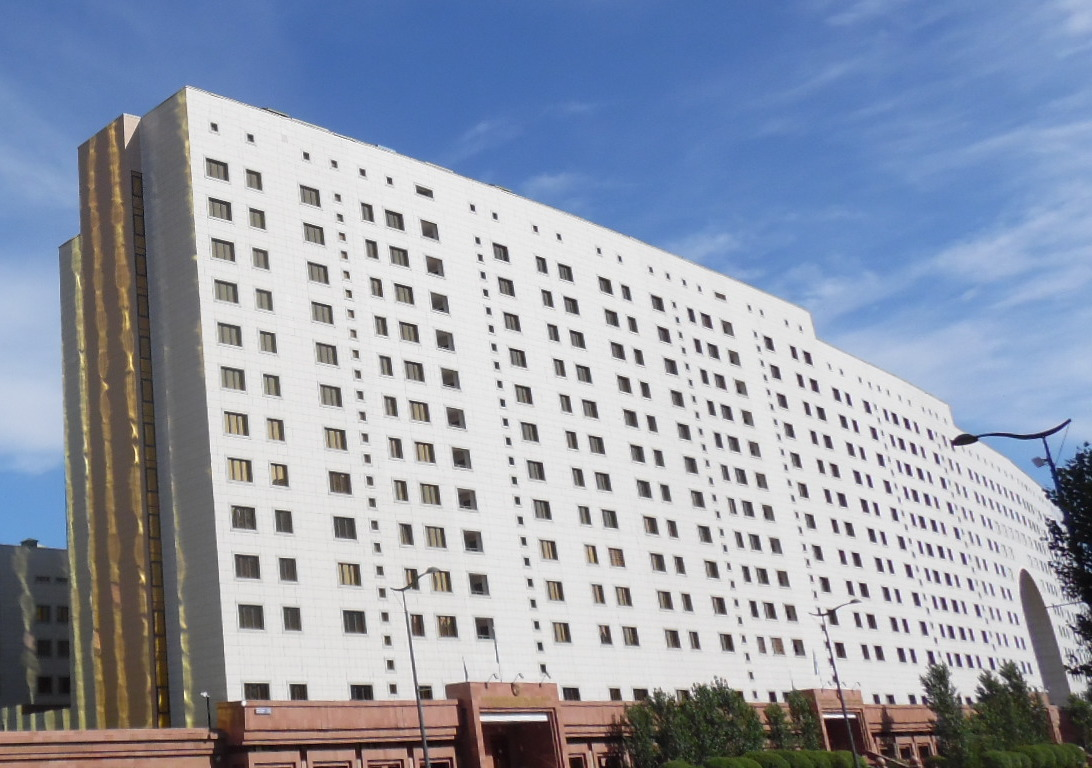
- House of Ministries

Agency overview
- Formed: 12 February 1992; 34 years ago
- Dissolved: 6 August 2014; 12 years ago
- Superseding agency: Ministry of Culture and Sports
- Jurisdiction: Government of Kazakhstan
- Headquarters: Astana, Kazakhstan

The Ministry of Culture (Kazakh: Мәдениет министрлігі, romanized: Mädeniet ministrlıgı) was an agency in the Government of Kazakhstan that was responsible for carrying out state regulation, as well as, within the limits provided for by law, intersectoral coordination in the spheres of culture, interethnic and interfaith harmony, ensuring the rights of citizens to freedom of religion and interaction with religious associations, the development of languages, archival affairs, documentation, and state symbols.

The Ministry was originally created in 1990 as the State Committee of the Kazakh SSR for Culture. Its first chairman was Kanat Saudabayev. On 12 February 1992, the Ministry was formed into the Ministry of Culture.

On 6 August 2014, it was reorganized into the Ministry of Culture and Sports.
