= Ministry of Education and Science (Kazakhstan) =

Government ministry of Kazakhstan

Ministry of Education and Science of the Republic of Kazakhstan
- Қазақстан Республикасы Білім және ғылым министрлігі (Kazakh); Министерство образования и науки Республики Казахстан (Russian)
- Emblem of Kazakhstan

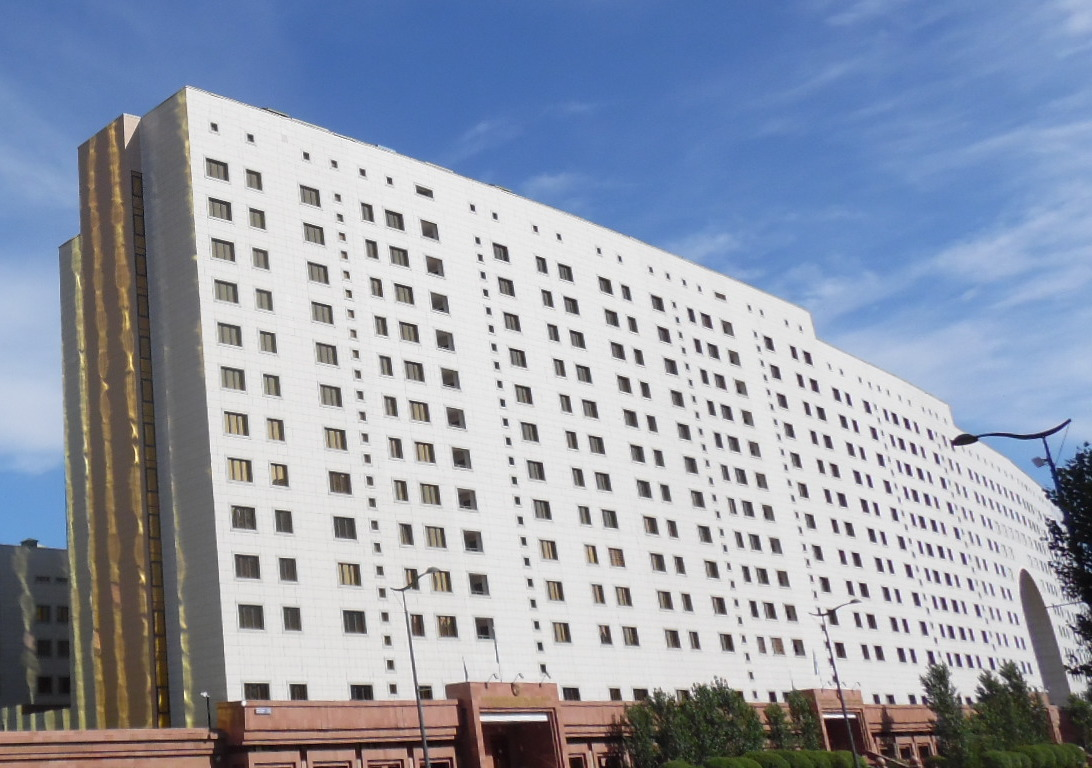
- House of Ministries

Agency overview
- Formed: 13 October 1999
- Preceding agency: Ministry of Education, Culture and Health of Kazakhstan
- Dissolved: 11 June 2022
- Superseding agencies: Ministry of Education; Ministry of Science and Higher Education
- Jurisdiction: Government of Kazakhstan
- Headquarters: Astana, Kazakhstan
- Agency executive: Sayasat Nurbek, Minister
- Website: Official website

The Ministry of Education and Science of the Republic of Kazakhstan (MES RK, Kazakh: Қазақстан Республикасы Білім және ғылым министрлігі, romanized: Qazaqstan Respublikasy Bılım jäne ğylym ministrlıgı, ҚР БҒМ; Russian: Министерство образования и науки Республики Казахстан, МОН РК) was a central executive body of the Government of Kazakhstan, which manages and within the limits provided for by law, intersectoral coordination in the fields of education, science, protection of children's rights and youth policy.

In 2022, the executive body was divided into the Ministry of Science and Higher Education as well as the Ministry of Education.

== History ==
The Ministry of Education of the Republic of Kazakhstan is the state authority performing management in the spheres of education, science, protection of children's rights. Minister of education of the Republic of Kazakhstan – Beisembayev Gani Bektaevich (since 2023).

Ministry of Science and Higher Education of the Republic of Kazakhstan minister – Sayassat Nurbek (Since 2022)

== Functions ==
- ensuring compliance with the constitutional rights and freedoms of citizens in the field of education
- formation of priority directions of fundamental and applied scientific research in the Republic of Kazakhstan
- implementation of education management, methodological and methodological support of the quality of educational services provided by organizations
- conducting state youth policy
- development and introduction to the statement of the Government of the Republic of Kazakhstan programs for the implementation of the State Youth Policy
- implementation of international cooperation in the field of science and youth policy
- development of various programs to implement the basic rights of the child
- implementation of intersectoral coordination in the field of education and science
- negotiations with foreign partners and the signing of international treaties (agreements) and educational programs, as well as scientific activities
- coordination of the activities of the Central and Local Executive Bodies of the Republic of Kazakhstan in the field of state youth policy
- approval of the procedure and criteria for competitive selection and the holding of a competition of universities that introduce innovative educational programs
- approval of the rules of organization and implementation of educational and methodical work
- approval of the rules for organizing the educational process on credit technology of training and remote educational technologies
- the organization of foreign events of republican significance
- development and approval of the sectoral system of promotion
- establishing order of direction for learning abroad
- approval of the rules of translation and restoration of students in the types of educational organizations
- implementation of information support for the education management system
- development of regulatory legal acts in the field of state youth policy
- determination of the method of certification of students
- approval of the charters of subordinate educational institutions

== Ministers ==
#	Name	Dates
1	Galym Abilseitov	June 30, 1992 - October 11, 1994
2	Vladimir Shkolnik	August 1994 - October 1999
3	Krymbek Kosherbayev	October 1999 - December 18, 2000
4	Nuraly Bekturganov	December 18, 2000 - January 2002
5	Shamsha Berkimbaeva	January 2002 - June 14, 2003
6	Zhaksybek Kulekeev	June 14, 2003 - December 14, 2004
7	Birganym Aitimova	December 14, 2004 - January 19, 2007
8	Zhanseit Tuimebayev	January 19, 2007 - September 22, 2010
9	Bakytzhan Zhumagulov	September 22, 2010 - September 2, 2013
10	Aslan Sarinzhipov	September 2, 2013 - February 10, 2016
11	Erlan Sagadiev	February 10, 2016 — 2019
12		February 25, 2019 - June 13, 2019
13	Askhat Kanatovich Aimagambetov	2019 - June 10, 2022
14	Sayasat Nurbek	June 11, 2022 - present
