= Ministry of Culture and Sports (Kazakhstan) =

Kazakh government ministry responsible for culture and sports

Ministry of Culture and Sports of the Republic of Kazakhstan
- Қазақстан Республикасы Мәдениет және спорт министрлігі (Kazakh); Министерство культуры и спорта Республики Казахстан (Russian)
- Emblem of Kazakhstan

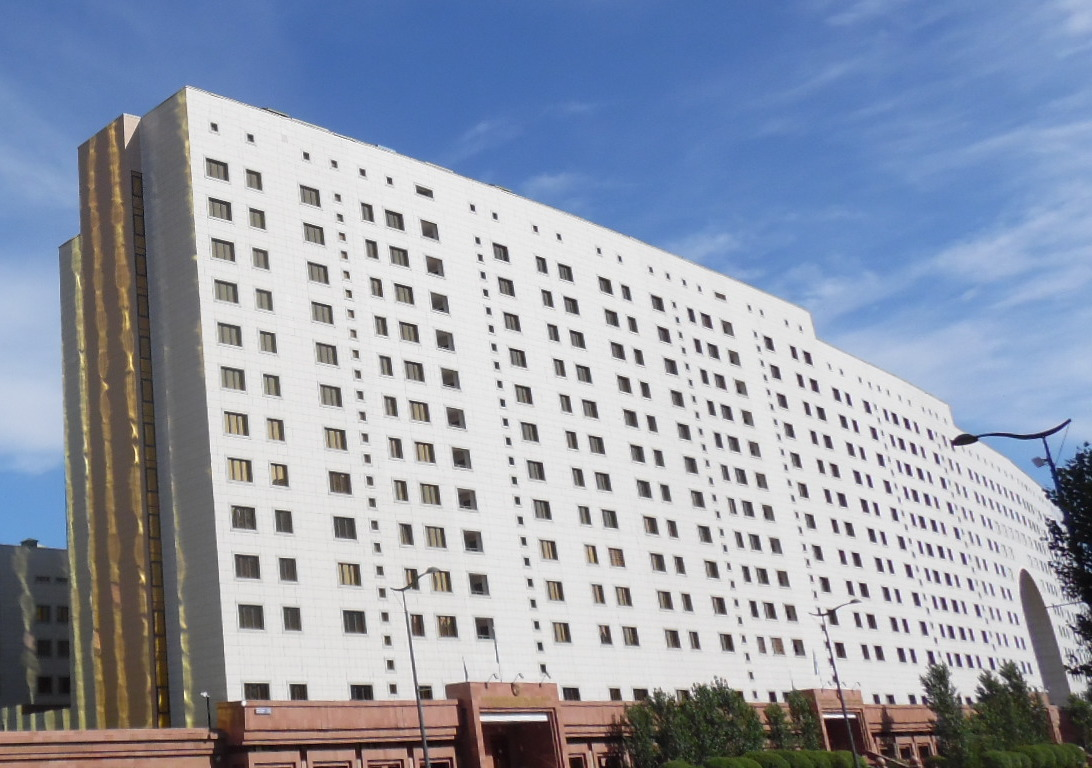
- House of Ministries

Agency overview
- Formed: 6 August 2014
- Preceding agency: Ministry of Culture
- Jurisdiction: Government of Kazakhstan
- Headquarters: Astana, Kazakhstan
- Agency executive: Askhat Oralov, Minister
- Website: Official website

The Ministry of Culture and Sports of the Republic of Kazakhstan (MCS RK, Kazakh: Қазақстан Республикасы Мәдениет және спорт министрлігі, romanized: Qazaqstan Respwblïkası Mädenïet jäne sport mïnïstrligi, ҚР МСМ; Russian: Министерство культуры и спорта Республики Казахстан, romanized: Ministerstvo kultury i sporta Respubliki Kazakhstan, МКС РК) is the central executive body in the Government of Kazakhstan, that provides leadership in the fields of culture, internal political stability, interethnic harmony, the development of languages, state symbols, state social order, archiving and documentation, religious activities, physical culture and sports, gambling, as well as intersectoral coordination and state regulation.

== History ==
Until 2014, the culture and sports were not managed by a single state structure.

The ministry was established in accordance with the Presidential Decree No. 875 dated 6 August 2014 with the transfer of the functions and powers:

- Of the Ministry of Culture of the Republic of Kazakhstan;
- In the field of archival affairs and documentation — from the Agency of the Republic of Kazakhstan for communication and information;
- Of the Agency of the Republic of Kazakhstan for Religious Affairs;
- Of the Agency of the Republic of Kazakhstan for Sports and Physical Culture.

On 5 August 2014, President Nursultan Nazarbayev appointed Arystanbek Muhamediuly as Minister of Culture and Sports of the Republic of Kazakhstan, freeing him from the post of Minister of Culture of the Republic of Kazakhstan.

== Functions ==
- Participation in the development and implementation of public policy in the areas of culture, protection and use of objects of historical and cultural heritage, the development of languages, archive business and documentation, religious activities and interaction with religious associations, physical culture and sports, gambling business;
- Implementation of intersectoral coordination in the areas of culture, protection and use of objects of historical and cultural heritage, language policy, archive business and documentation, state social order, physical culture and sports.

== Structure ==
=== Departments ===
- Department of Archive business and Documentation;
- Department of Analysis and Strategic Planning;
- Department of Culture and Art;
- Department of Economics and Finance;
- Department of Educational, Scientific Activities and International Cooperation;
- Department of Legal Service.

=== Committees ===
- Committee on Sports and Physical Culture;
- Committee on Religious Affairs;
- Committee for the Development of Languages and Social and Political work.

=== Services ===
- Service of Public Secrets, Mobilization Work;
- Personnel Management Service;
- Internal Audit Service.
