= Bolat Zhamishev =

Kazakhstan Minister of Finance (born 1957)

Bolat Zhämishev
- Болат Жәмішев
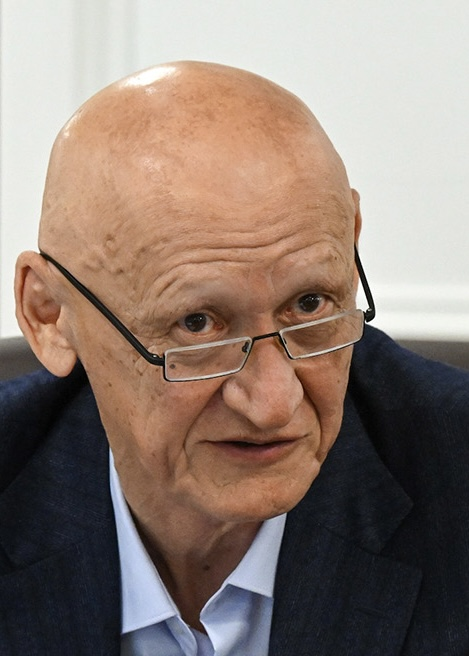
- Zhämishev in 2026

Minister of Regional Development
- In office 6 November 2013 – 6 August 2014
- President: Nursultan Nazarbaev
- Prime Minister: Serik Akhmetov (2013–2014); Kärim Mäsimov (2014)
- Preceded by: Baqytzhan Saghyntaev
- Succeeded by: Office abolished

Minister of Finance
- In office 13 November 2007 – 6 November 2013
- President: Nursultan Nazarbaev
- Prime Minister: Kärim Mäsimov (2007–2012); Serik Akhmetov (2013)
- Preceded by: Natalia Korzhova
- Succeeded by: Baqyt Sultanov

Personal details
- Born: 28 June 1957 (age 69) Almaty, Kazakh SSR, Soviet Union
- Party: Amanat
- Spouse: Bätila Zhämisheva
- Education: Kazakh Institute of Agriculture

Bolat Bidahmetuly Zhämishev (Note: Often transliterated as Bolat Bidakhmetovich Zhamishev through a Russified Romanization of Болат Бидахметович Жамишев.) (Kazakh: Болат Бидахметұлы Жәмішев, romanized: Bolat Bidahmetūly Jämışev; born 28 June 1957) is a Kazakh politician who served as the Minister of Finance from 2007 to 2013, and Minister of Regional Development from 2013 to 2014. Since 5 November 2020, he is the Chairman of the Board of Directors of the JSC RBK Bank. Was appointed Chairman of the Kazakhstan Khalqyna Foundation, established after the January events of 2022 in Kazakhstan.

Since 17 February 2022, he has headed the Samuryq-Qazyna Public Council.

On 4 July 2022, he was elected a member of the Board of Directors, an independent director of the Samuryq-Qazyna Foundation.

== Personal life ==
Zhämishev was born in 1957. He is an alumnus of the Kazakh Agriculture Institute, and has a PhD in economics. Following graduation, he was involved in scientific research. He held positions of a National Bank Department Vice Head, Vice Minister of Labor and Social Protection, First Vice Minister of Finance, Vice Minister of Internal Affairs, Vice Chairman of the National Bank, Chairman of the Agency for Supervision over Financial Market and Financial Institutions. Before being appointed Finance Minister in November 2007, he served as Vice Chairman of the Executive Board of the Eurasian Bank for Development. He is married and has two sons, Däwlet and Quanysh.

== Notes ==
Political offices
Preceded by Natalia Korzhova	Minister of Finance; 2007–2013	Succeeded by Baqyt Sultanov
