= 2009 Taldykorgan fire =

Building fire in Kazakhstan

Coordinates: 45°01′N 78°22′E

Location of Almaty Region in Kazakhstan

The 2009 Taldykorgan fire occurred on 13 September 2009, when at least 38 people were killed in a fire at a drug abuse clinic in Taldykorgan, Almaty Region, Kazakhstan. At least 10 others were re-hospitalised after the fire. Two of the dead were staff, the other 36 were patients. The building dates from 1951. The cause of the blaze is unknown.

== Fire ==
The fire started at 5:30 am. The fire quickly spread through the single story Soviet-era building. Locked doors and barred windows blocked many escape routes, and screams were heard coming from the building for over 20 minutes. Forty people were evacuated from the building by rescuers. Ten people were taken to the hospital, where they were treated for severe burn injuries. Firefighters extinguished the fire after several hours. The Bodies of 36 patients and two workers were recovered from the building, and taken to the city morgue where relatives were witnessed wailing. One victim's sister criticised police for taking him away because "he was drinking too much. They said they were taking him away for six months to cure him of alcoholism but now he's dead". Another woman, this one named Fatima, stated: "I heard them screaming for 20 minutes. They were screaming, 'Save us, save us'". Relatives of the victims were warned by police not to talk to journalists, but a woman who lost her husband spoke to Al Jazeera on condition of anonymity. Journalists were not allowed to speak to victims in the hospital, but one patient whose bed was by the window told journalists that patients at the drug clinic had been locked in when the fire started before he was discovered by a police officer and pulled from the window.

== Reaction ==
Karim Massimov, Kazakhstan's Prime Minister, asked for an investigation to take place. The Emergencies Ministry later released a statement saying: "The fire had spread rapidly because fire fighters had been alerted late". Serik Akhmetov, the Deputy Prime Minister, is to fly to Taldykorgan.

A commission to investigate the fire was established. The building itself was visited by fire safety inspectors in May 2009. A number of violations were discovered, and the building was found to have no alarm system. Some violations had since been fixed, but an alarm system had still not been installed.
