= Agency for Regulation and Development of the Financial Market (Kazakhstan) =

Government agency of Kazakhstan

Coordinates: 43°14′7″N 76°55′5″E

Agency of the Republic of Kazakhstan for Regulation and Development of the Financial Market
- Қазақстан Республикасы Қаржы нарығын реттеу және дамыту агенттігі (Kazakh); Агентство Республики Казахстан по регулированию и развитию финансового рынка (Russian)
- Emblem of Kazakhstan

Agency overview
- Formed: January 1, 2020
- Preceding agency: Committee for Control and Supervision of the Financial Market and Financial Organizations of the National Bank
- Jurisdiction: president of Kazakhstan
- Headquarters: microdistrict "Koktem-3", 21, Almaty
- Chairman responsible: Madina Abilqasymova
- Website: www.gov.kz/memleket/entities/ardfm/press/news/1?lang=en

The Agency of the Republic of Kazakhstan for Regulation and Development of the Financial Market (Kazakh: Қазақстан Республикасының Қаржы нарығын реттеу және дамыту агенттігі; Russian: Агентство Республики Казахстан по регулированию и развитию финансового рынка) is a state body reporting directly to the president, established on January 1, 2020, by president Kassym‑Jomart Tokayev’s decree, responsible for regulating, controlling and supervising the country’s financial markets, acting as the legal successor to the National Bank for transferred regulatory powers, protecting consumers of financial services, and promoting the stability of Kazakhstan’s financial system.

== Office holders ==
=== Chairman of the Agency for Regulation and Supervision of the Financial Market and Financial Organizations ===
No.	Portrait	Name	Start	End	Source
1		Bolat Jämişev	6 January 2004	19 January 2006	
2		Arman Dunaev	19 January 2006	23 January 2008	
3		Elena Bakhmutova	23 January 2008	12 April 2011	

=== Chairman of the Committee for Control and Supervision of the Financial Market and Financial Organizations of the National Bank ===
No.	Portrait	Name	Start	End	Source
1		Qwat Qojaxmetov	19 April 2011	24 January 2014	
—		Mukhtar Böbeev	24 January 2014	16 May 2014	

== History ==
On January 1, 2004, by Decree of President Nazarbayev No. 1270, the Agency for Regulation and Supervision of the Financial Market and Financial Organizations was established under the National Bank.

On April 12, 2011, by Presidential Decree No. 25, the functions of the Agency were transferred to the National Bank, and on April 18, by Decree No. 61, the Committee for Control and Supervision of the Financial Market and Financial Organizations was formed within the National Bank on the basis of these functions. On 16 May, 2014 the Committee

On November 11, 2019, by Decree of President Tokayev No. 203, the Committee was reorganized into the Agency for Regulation and Development of the Financial Market, which began operations on January 1, 2020.

== Organization ==
The Agency’s headquarters is located in Almaty. It is funded by the National Bank.

=== Departments ===
- Banking Regulation Department
- Behavioral Supervision Department
- Risk Analysis and Stress Testing Department
- Insurance Market and Actuarial Calculations Department
- Social Projects and Financial Literacy Department
- Securities Market Department
- Methodology and Prudential Regulation of Financial Organizations Department
- Strategy and Analysis Department
- Legal Department
- Human Capital Development Department
- Digital Development and Information Technology Department
- Coordination Department (Astana)
- Agency Operations Support Department
- Information and Cybersecurity Department
- International Cooperation Department
- Supervisory Technologies and Artificial Intelligence Department
- Non-Bank Financial Institutions Regulation Department.

=== Divisions ===
- External Communications Directorate
- Chairperson’s Office Directorate
- Internal Audit Directorate
- State Secrets Protection and Mobilization Preparedness Directorate
- Accounting and Budget Planning Directorate
- Security Directorate.

=== Regions ===
Regional offices of the Agency are called Office of Regional Representatives and are located in Astana, Almaty, Jezkazgan, Qonayev, Semey, Shymkent, Oskemen, Oral, Turkistan, Taraz, Petropavl, Pavlodar, Kyzylorda, Kostanay, Kokshetau, Karaganda, Atyrau, Aktobe, Aktau.

== Authorities ==
=== Duties ===
- Promote financial system stability
- Regulate, control, and supervise the financial market and organizations
- Protect rights of financial service consumers
- Publish information on financial organizations and measures against them
- Consider appeals from citizens and legal entities.

=== Rights ===
- Develop and adopt normative acts binding on financial organizations, non-resident branches, service consumers
- Request any information, including secrets, from individuals, legal entities, associations, and state bodies
- Conduct inspections, control, and supervision, involving the National Bank, auditors, appraisers, and experts
- Send representatives to banks, holdings, insurance organizations, and guarantee funds
- Apply measures for violations in the financial sector
- Use professional judgment on banks, insurers, market participants, and managers.

== Leadership ==
The chairman and deputy chairman of the agency are appointed solely by the president. The chairman is allowed to have 4 deputies.
