= Erasyl Abilqasymov =

Kazakh politician

- Ерасыл Әбілқасымов

Member of the Mazhilis
- In office November 2001 – 20 June 2007
- Preceded by: Constituency established
- Succeeded by: Qudaibergen Beksultanov (2023)
- Constituency: Almaty Region, No. 18 (2004–2007)

Chairman of the Qazaq Eli
- In office April 2001 – 11 May 2004
- Preceded by: Office established
- Succeeded by: Office abolished

Personal details
- Born: 28 July 1948 (age 77) Bostan, Kazakh SSR, Soviet Union
- Party: Qazaq Eli (2001–2004); QKHP (until 2007)
- Spouse: Alma Abilqasymova
- Children: 3, including Madina
- Education: Talgar Medical School; Kazakh National Medical University; Al-Farabi Kazakh National University

Erasyl Äbılqasymov (Kazakh: Ерасыл Әбілқасымов; born 28 July 1948) is a retired Kazakh politician who served as a member of the Mäjilis from 2001 to 2007. He was a candidate for the Communist People's Party of Kazakhstan (QKHP) in the 2005 presidential election.

== Early life and education ==
Abilqasymov was born in the village of Bostan in Almaty Region. In 1967, he graduated from the Talgar Medical School as a medical assistant then in 1972 from the Kazakh National Medical University with a degree in healthcare organization. In 1987, Abilqasymov finished Al-Farabi Kazakh National University where he learned history. He earned his doctorate in medical sciences in 1996 with the thesis topic: "Historical, theoretical and organizational and economic foundations of the introduction of the compulsory health insurance system in the Republic of Kazakhstan".

== Early career ==
From 1972, Abilqasymov was a research assistant at the Kazakh National Medical University. In 1973, he became a trainee researcher at the Moscow State University of Medicine and Dentistry and from 1974, as a senior laboratory assistant at the Kazakh National Medical University. From 1983 to 1987, Abilqasymov worked as the Deputy Head of the Personnel Department and Educational Institutions, Head of the Personnel Department, Head of the Planning and Financial Department of the Ministry of Health of the Kazakh SSR. In 1988, he became the chief physician of the Alma-Ata City Self-Supporting Consultative and Diagnostic Polyclinic until 1991, when becoming the chief physician of the Republican Self-Supporting Scientific and Practical Center of Oriental and Modern Medicine. While working there, Abilqasymov was the leading and chief researcher at the Kazakhstan Academy of Sciences from 1995. In 1999, he was appointed as the Head of the laboratory, and the Director of the Scientific Center for Medical and Economic Problems of Health Care.

== Political career ==
=== Member of the Mäjilis ===
In 2001, Abilqasymov became a deputy of the Mäjilis. From there, he was a member of Committee for Social and Cultural Development. He was reelected in 2004 as an independent from the Electoral district No. 18 in the Almaty Region and was a member of the Committee on International Affairs, Defense and Security until 2007. During his tenure, Abilqasymov was known for having to sharply criticize the actions of the government, making populist statements and being very popular amongst journalists who he often gave public interviews with.

=== 2005 presidential campaign ===
While serving as parliamentarian, Abilqasymov was unanimously chosen to be the first-ever presidential nominee for the Communist People's Party of Kazakhstan (QKHP) during the 2005 presidential election on 17 September 2005. He campaigned around the topic of fighting corruption. Abilqasymov himself doubted that he would win the race but hoped that he'd secure Zharmakhan Tuyakbay's spot and finish as second place frontrunner. However, he officially swept 0.34% in the results, taking fourth place just behind Alikhan Baimenov.

== Post-Mäjilis career ==
After his office term as a Mäjilis deputy expired, Abilqasymov, on 13 August 2007, during a live TV broadcast, he called on people to support the ruling Nur Otan party during the 2007 legislative election. As a result, Abilqasymov was excluded from the Communist People's Party of Kazakhstan by its leaders.

In 2012, he became the chairman of the Board of Directors of JSC Dzharbusynov Scientific Center of Urology and is currently managing his own medical companies.

== Personal life ==
Abilqasymov is married to Alma Abilqasymova, doctor of pedagogical sciences, professor, academician of the IAS HS. He has 3 children which two of his sons are Almaz (born 1977), Maqsat (born 1983). Abiqasymov's daughter Madina Abilqasymova (born 1978) served as a Minister of Labour and Social Protection of the Population from 2018 to 2019 under Prime Minister Bakhytjan Sagintayev.
