= Madina Abilqasymova =

Kazakh politician (born 1978)

- Мәдина Әбілқасымова
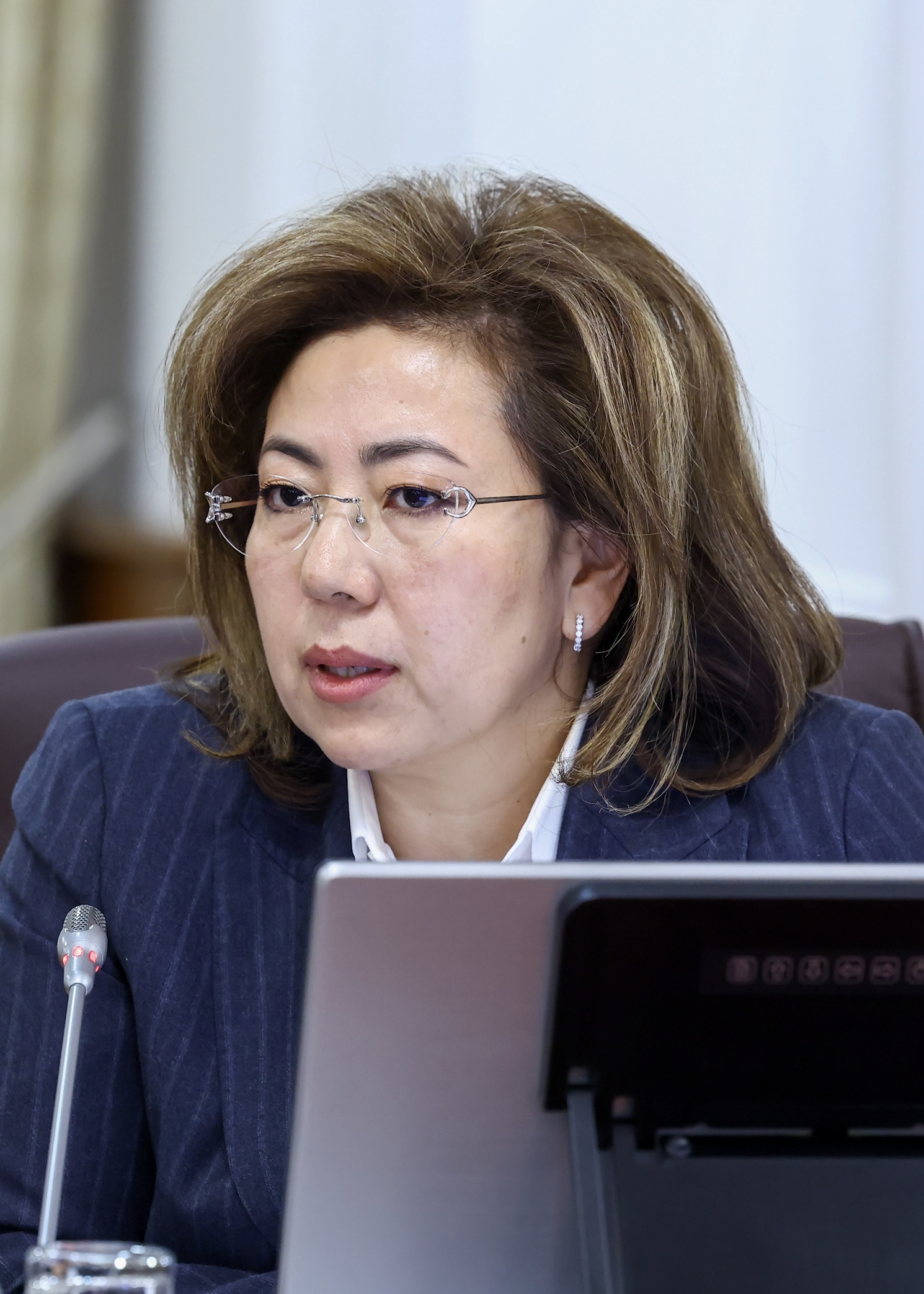
- Abilqasymova in 2025

Head of the Agency for Regulation and Development of the Financial Market
- Incumbent
- Assumed office 18 December 2019
- President: Kassym-Jomart Tokayev
- Preceded by: office established

Minister of Labour and Social Protection of the Population
- In office 9 February 2018 – 25 February 2019
- President: Nursultan Nazarbayev
- Prime Minister: Bakhytzhan Sagintayev
- Preceded by: Tamara Duisenova
- Succeeded by: Berdibek Saparbayev

Personal details
- Born: 1 August 1978 (age 47) Alma-Ata, Kazakh SSR, Soviet Union
- Children: 3
- Parent: Erasyl Abilqasymov (father)
- Education: Narxoz University; Columbia University; John F. Kennedy School of Government

Mädina Erasylqyzy Äbılqasymova (Kazakh: Мәдина Ерасылқызы Әбілқасымова; born 1 August 1978) is a Kazakh politician serving as the head of the Agency for Regulation and Development of the Financial Market of Kazakhstan since 2019. She previously served as the Minister of Labour and Social Protection of the Population from 2018 to 2019.

== Biography ==
=== Early life and education ===
Born in Alma-Ata, Abilqasymova graduated from Narxoz University in 1999 with a specialty in "International Economic Relations". In 2003, she earned a master's at Columbia University in International Relations, majoring in Economic Policy Management and then from the John F. Kennedy School of Government at Harvard University with a master in Public Administration.

=== Career ===
In 1999, Abilqasymova became a chief specialist of the Agency of the Republic of Kazakhstan for Strategic Planning. From 2003 to 2004, she was the head of the Strategic Planning Department of the Ministry of Economy and Budget Planning. In 2004, she became the director of the Department of State Policy Analysis of the JSC Center for Marketing and Analytical Research. From 2006 to 2008, Abilqasymova served as the deputy head of the Socio-Economic Department of the Prime Minister's Office. In 2008, she became the head of the Center for Strategic Research and Analysis of the Presidential Administration.

From 2011 to 2013, she was the Vice Minister of Economic Development and Trade of Kazakhstan. In 2012, Abilqasymova became the Deputy Governor from Kazakhstan at the World Bank. From 2013 to 2014, she served as a Vice Minister of Economy and Budget Planning. In August 2014, Abilqasymova became the Vice Minister of National Economy. In 2015, while working as Vice Minister, Abilqasymova went on maternity leave, and Aidar Arifhanov was temporarily appointed to her position.

From February 9, 2018 to February 25, 2019, she served as the Minister of Labor and Social Protection of the Republic of Kazakhstan. During Abylkasymova's tenure, benefits for mothers with many children increased from 15,400 to 16,100 tenge. It was reported that similar benefits were not available in a number of other countries (for example, Azerbaijan only provides benefits for children aged 1 year and older, targeting only low-income families, not large families; Tajikistan has not provided any benefits to large families; it operates a system of targeted assistance for the country's least affluent families). Meanwhile, in Kazakhstan, mothers with many children receive several million tenge over their entire life, with benefits paid for life. This statement provoked a strong public reaction and became the basis for a discussion of an important social agenda. Following the tragic fire in Astana on the night of February 4, in which five children died, public attention once again focused on the situation of large families in the country. Emotional comments and proposals for increased social support began to appear on social media. In response to public demand, the Ministry of Labor and Social Protection began implementing a number of measures aimed at improving conditions for large families and increasing the targeting of assistance.

On March 28, 2019, Madina Abylkasymova became Deputy Chairperson of the National Bank of the Republic of Kazakhstan following the resignation of the government.

March 12–28, 2019 - First Vice Minister of National Economy.

On 28 March 2019, she became the deputy chair of the National Bank of Kazakhstan. In July 2020, to increase the accountability of credit institutions, the agency adopted regulations providing for mandatory licensing of microfinance activities from January 1, 2021. In November 2020, Madina Abylkasymova presented a concept being developed jointly with the National Bank of the Republic of Kazakhstan and market participants. It envisages the formation of a competitive and high-tech financial sector by 2030. The concept identifies seven priorities, including the implementation of international standards (Basel III, Solvency II), the development of digital and investment banking, transparency, and ESG standards.

Since 18 December 2019, Abilqasymova has been serving as the chair of the Agency of the Republic of Kazakhstan on Regulation and Development of the Financial Market. In 2020, as part of anti-crisis measures during the COVID-19 pandemic, loan payment deferrals were granted to individuals and small and medium-sized businesses. A program of preferential lending to SMEs for working capital was adopted jointly with the National Bank of Kazakhstan. A program to assist all those unemployed during the COVID-19 pandemic was introduced in the amount of 42,500 tenge. On October 28, 2021, Abylkasymova approved the Methodology for Calculating Target Indicators for the Development Plan of the Agency for the Development of the Financial Markets of the Russian Federation for the period 2020-2024. Initiatives include the issuance of tokenized mortgage bonds, the creation of a Guarantee Fund for SMEs, expanded investment opportunities for insurance companies, and reforms to resolve insolvent banks.

== Personal life ==
Abilqasymova is married and has 3 children. Her father Erasyl Abilqasymov (born 1948) is a known doctor, author of the book "The system of compulsory health insurance in the Republic of Kazakhstan", member of the 2nd Mazhilis, and a candidate in the 2005 Kazakh presidential election.
