= Ramazan Yesergepov =

Ramazan Yesergepov (Kazakh: Рамазан Есіргепов, Ramazan Esirgepov, رامازان ەسٸرگەپوۆ; Russian: Рамазан Тахтарович Есергепов, Ramazan Takhtarovich Yesergepov) is a Kazakhstani journalist, whose 2009 arrest led to international concerns about the freedom of the media in Kazakhstan. Prior to his arrest he was the editor of Alma-Ata Info.

== Personal life ==
Yesergepov is married to Raushan Yesergepova.

== Career ==
Yesergepov founded Alma-Ata Info in 2005. In 2006, the newspaper was charged under Administrative Code Article 342 for alleged violations of the law on mass media; namely, the Almaty City Council claimed that the newspaper had changed its thematic focus but failed to register the change with the government. The newspaper faced a maximum fine of T206,000 (roughly US$1600). Yesergepov believed the real reason for the charges was retaliation for articles criticising the authorities.

In November 2008, Yesergepov published a piece entitled "Who Rules the Country: President or National Security Committee?", featuring private correspondence from the chief of the Jambyl Regional Department of the National Security Committee. The NSC then listed the document as classified information, and ordered Yesergepov to reveal his sources. Around the same time, Yesergepov suffered an infarction and went to obtain medical care; due to his hospitalisation, he did not attend an interrogation as ordered, even after his release from hospital.

== Arrest and imprisonment ==
On 6 January 2009, officers of the NSC's Jambyl department detained Yesergepov on charges of "unlawful compilation and proliferation of information containing state secrets" and "abuse of position". The initial charges were brought under Penal Code Article 172 Part 2, carrying a maximum sentence of three years. However, the Taraz District Court #2 then decided to charge Yesergepov under Part 4 of the same article instead, meaning that he could face up to eight years in prison. In August 2009 he was sentenced to three years in prison; the Supreme Court rejected an appeal to investigate the legality of the decision. Yesergepov's case returned to the Taraz court, which upheld the original sentence in October 2009.

Yesergepov was imprisoned at Taraz Standard Regime Penal Colony #158/2. He applied for parole in January 2010; when that request was denied, he requested transfer to a lesser-security colony-settlement instead, which was also refused. On 30 June 2010, he announced his intention to go on hunger strike. His hunger strike lasted until 11 July. Two days later, his next request for parole was also denied. At the end of that month, his wife delivered an appeal from her husband to Viktoriya Tiuneleva of the NGO Kazakhstani Bureau for Human Rights, to be forwarded to the United Nations Human Rights Council. In September 2010, another application of Yesergepov's for transfer to a colony-settlement was denied.

== Response to imprisonment ==
The case against Yesergepov led to condemnation by Kazakhstani opposition party Azat, which called his arrest an attempt to intimidate journalists. Local newspaper Adil Soz stated that Yesergepov did not receive a public trial, violating Criminal Procedural Code Article 17. A number of international organisations also condemned the matter. The Organization for Security and Co-operation in Europe, to which Kazakhstan had submitted a bid for chairmanship, stated that Yesergepov's imprisonment "violated international standards and Kazakhstan's commitments on media freedom", and sent a letter of protest to the Kazakhstani government. The New York-based Committee to Protect Journalists accused Kazakhstan's government of undermining the OSCE through human rights violation at home; Ministry of Foreign Affairs spokesman Ilyas Omarov stated in response that no OSCE member state had complained to his ministry over the matter, and that Kazakhstan had a "healthy media environment" run primarily by private companies rather than state bodies. Human Rights Watch also pointed to the case as an example of Kazakhstan's "chilling environment for freedom of expression.

== Release and Later Life ==
Yesergepov was released on January 6, 2012, upon completion of his sentence. In May of 2017, he was stabbed by unknown assailants, which he claimed was related to his work. He has since moved out of Kazakhstan and settled in Europe.
