= National Security Committee (Kazakhstan) =

Government agency of Kazakhstan

National Security Committee of the Republic of Kazakhstan
- Қазақстан Республикасы Ұлттық Қауіпсіздік Комитеті; Qazaqstan Respublikasy Ulttyq Qawipsizdik Komiteti
- The emblem of The National Security Committee of the Republic of Kazakhstan

- Flag of the National Security Committee of the Republic of Kazakhstan

Agency overview
- Formed: 13 July 1992; 34 years ago
- Preceding agency: MQK
- Agency executive: Chairman, Marat Irmenov
- Website: www.gov.kz

Footnotes
- Also referred to by the abbreviations UQK, KNB or NSC, or unofficially as the Kazakh National Security Service

The National Security Committee of the Republic of Kazakhstan (NSC) (Note: Kazakh: Қазақстан Республикасының Ұлттық қауіпсіздік комитеті, ҰҚК, romanized: Qazaqstan Respublikasynyñ Ūlttyq qauıpsızdık komitetı, ŪQK; Russian: Комитет национальной безопасности Республики Казахстан, romanized: Komitet Natsional'noy Bezopasnosti Respubliki Kazakhstan, КНБ) is an intelligence agency in Kazakhstan founded on 13 July 1992. It primarily manages the Border Service of Kazakhstan, which conducts oversight over the international borders of Kazakhstan. The NSC also oversees the Arystan ('Lions') commando unit.

== History ==
The NSC was created in accordance with a law passed by parliament in July 1992 which authorised the establishment of an agency to replace the KGB, the old national security apparatus of the Soviet Union. Initially, it retained most of the staff which the KGB had employed in Kazakhstan, as well as the powers the KGB had held; its first head, Bulat Baekenov, had worked for the KGB for over two decades. Its early years were marked by close cooperation with Russia on issues of border security and counter-intelligence against alleged foreign spies.

In December 1995, a new presidential decree modified some of the NSC's powers.

In January 2010, Kazakhstani president Nursultan Nazarbayev appointed his nephew Samat Abish as the NSC's head of human resources; opposition lawmaker Serikbolsyn Abdildin of the Communist Party of Kazakhstan claimed this shows that Nazarbayev considers personal loyalty more important than skill in government posts.

== Operations ==
In November 2008, journalist Ramazan Yesergepov published an article entitled "Who Rules the Country: President or National Security Committee?" It contained private NSC correspondence which was later listed as classified, resulting in his 2009 arrest and conviction on security charges. The case led to domestic and international condemnation. In early 2021, the NSC, in coordination with the Foreign Ministry and the United States, conducted an operation under the auspices of "Operation Zhusan" to return a group of Kazakhstani citizens from Syria.

=== Main directions of activity ===
- Counterintelligence Service, support law enforcement in neutralizing threats to national security.
- Anti-Terror Service, protects the country from terrorist threats.
- Economic Security Service, suppresses activities aimed at causing economic damage to Kazakhstan.
- Information and Cyber Security Service, ensures the protection of the nation from internal and external threats to cyberspace.
- Department of Military Counterintelligence, serves to identify, prevent and suppress in the Armed Forces, other troops and military formations, intelligence and other activities aimed at damaging the security of the republic.
- Service "A", suppresses acts of terrorism.

Nominal structure Structural divisions and departments of the National Security Committee:

- Counterintelligence Service
- Military Police Department of the National Security Committee
- "Syrbar" (Foreign Intelligence Service)
- Anti-terror service
- Economic Security Service
- Information and Cyber Security Service
- Department of Military Counterintelligence
- Government Liaison Service
- Border Service
- Arystan Commando Unit
- Special Forces Service (SSN)
- State Technical Service
- 17 Territorial Divisions
- Research and educational institutions

== Arystan Commando Unit ==
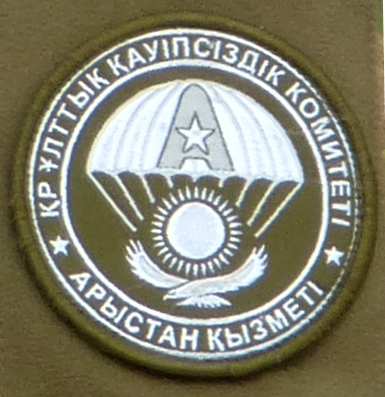
The shoulder patch of the unit.

The Arystan ("Lions") Commando Unit (Russian: специального назначения «Арыстан», romanized: spetsial'nogo naznacheniya "Arystan") is a special forces unit of the Office of the NSC and the armed forces. It was created as part of the Presidential Security Service on 13 January 1992. It succeeded the Alpha Group of the Soviet KGB based in the Almaty Oblast (12th Group), which was dissolved in October 1990. Since April 1993, the unit has been referred to as the Arystan Unit. Every year, personnel of the unit are required to pass a qualifying exam. It currently operates in Astana, Almaty, and Aktau (the latter being done in order to ensure safety in the oil-producing fields). Its nickname is the Holy Slim of Kazakhstan (Kazakh: Қасиетті Елім Қазақстан, romanized: Qasiettı Elım Qazaqstan). Today's training of "Arystan" is based on extensive international experience, having training from the Special Purpose Center (CSN) of the Russian Federal Security Service, the American Central Intelligence Agency and Federal Bureau of Investigation, as well as the GSG 9 of the German Federal Police. Notable commanders include Viktor Fyodorovich Karpukhin and Amangeldy Shabdarbayev.

In 2006, five members of the unit were arrested and charged with the kidnapping and death of the co-chairman of the opposition Naghyz Ak Zhol party Altynbek Sarsenbayuly, as well as his driver and bodyguard. Interior Minister Baurzhan Mukhamedzhanov stated that the unit members were paid $25,000 in return for committing the murder.

== Chairman ==
The KNB of Kazakhstan is headed by the chairman, who is appointed by the President of the Republic with the consent of the Senate of the Parliament of the Republic and dismissed by the president of the Republic from office.

=== List of chairmen ===
- Bulat Baekenov (October 1991 – December 1993)
- Sat Tokpakbayev (December 1993 – November 1995) left his post to take up the chairmanship of the Special Security Division (Специализированное охранное подразделение) of the Ministry of Internal Affairs
- Dzhenisbek Dzhumanbekov (November 1995 – May 1997) his term was marked by scandal over illegal dealings with Iran, and his vice-chairman was sacked; Dzhumanbekov himself resigned from his position and left public life
- Alnur Musaev (May 1997 – September 1998)
- Nurtai Abykayev (1 September 1998 – August 1999)
- Alnur Musaev (August 1999 – May 2001)
- Marat Tazhin (May 2001 – December 2001)
- Nartai Dutbayev (December 2001 – 22 February 2006)
- Amangeldy Shabdarbayev (2 March 2006 – 7 December 2009)
- Adil Shayakhmetov (9 December 2009 – August 2010)
- Nurtai Abykayev (August 2010 – December 2015)
- Vladimir Zhumakanov (December 2015 – September 2016)
- Karim Massimov (September 2016 – January 2022)
- Ermek Sağymbaev (January 2022 – 16 November 2026)
- Marat Irmenov (since 16 November 2026)

=== Chairman controversies ===
- Chairman Musaev's second term was ended by dismissal from his post due to personal conflicts with the president and other elites
- Chairman Nurtai Abykayev was dismissed from his post for his role in a scandal over the sale of old MiG fighter planes to North Korea by the Kazakhstan Ministry of Defense, and replaced by his predecessor.
- Adil Shayakhmetov was removed from his post in the aftermath of the arrest of Prosecutor-General's Office official Murat Musabekov, who was fingered as allegedly plotting a coup in an anonymous letter allegedly circulated by NSC officers.
- Nartai Dutbayev resigned in scandal over murder of opposition politician Altynbek Sarsenbayev.
