= Bakhytjan Sagintayev =

Kazakh politician (born 1963)

Bakhytzhan Sagintayev
- Бақытжан Сағынтаев
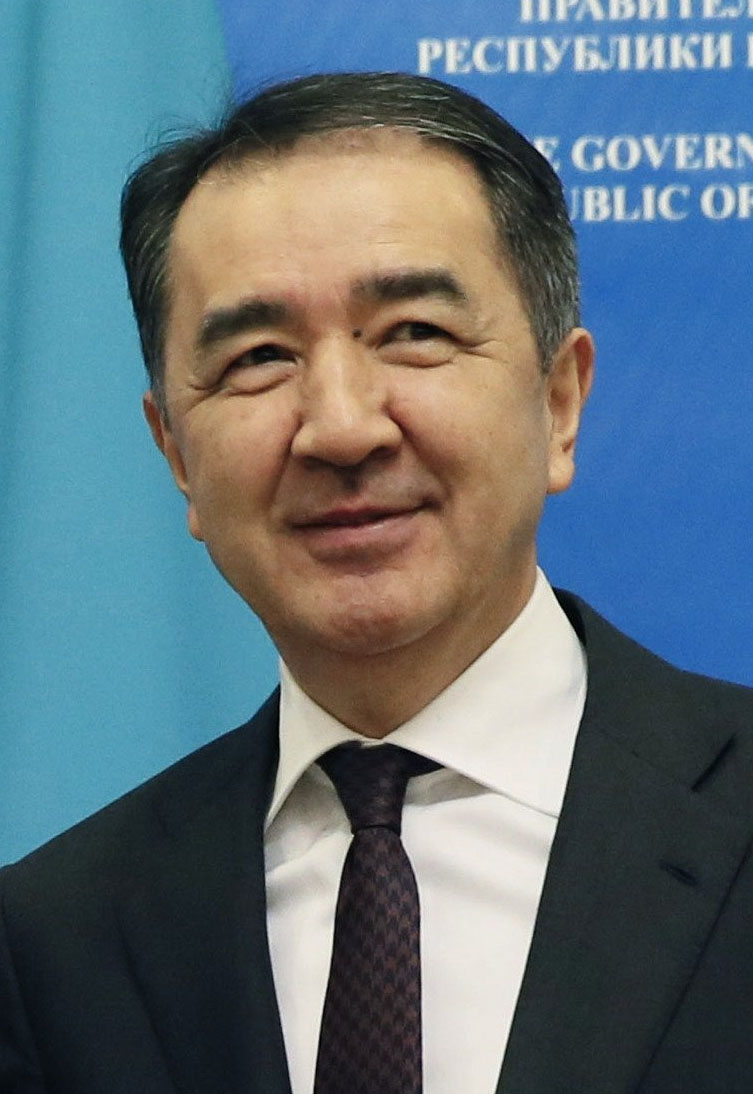
- Sagintayev in 2018

Chairman of the Board of the Eurasian Economic Commission
- Incumbent
- Assumed office 1 February 2024
- Preceded by: Mikhail Myasnikovich

7th Äkim of Almaty
- In office 28 June 2019 – 31 January 2022
- Deputy: Erlan Qojağapanov
- Preceded by: Bauyrjan Baibek
- Succeeded by: Erbolat Dosaev

Head of the Presidential Administration of Kazakhstan
- In office 24 March 2019 – 28 June 2019
- President: Kassym-Jomart Tokayev
- First Deputy: Darhan Kaletaev
- Preceded by: Asset Issekeshev
- Succeeded by: Krymbek Kusherbayev

State Secretary of Kazakhstan
- In office 1 March 2019 – 24 March 2019
- President: Nursultan Nazarbayev; Kassym-Jomart Tokayev
- Preceded by: Gulshara Abdykhalikova
- Succeeded by: Marat Tazhin

9th Prime Minister of Kazakhstan
- In office 9 September 2016 – 21 February 2019; Acting: 8 September 2016 – 9 September 2016
- President: Nursultan Nazarbayev
- First Deputy: Askar Mamin
- Preceded by: Karim Massimov
- Succeeded by: Askar Mamin

First Deputy Prime Minister of Kazakhstan
- In office 16 January 2013 – 8 September 2016
- Prime Minister: Serik Akhmetov; Karim Massimov
- Preceded by: Krymbek Kusherbayev
- Succeeded by: Askar Mamin

Minister of Regional Development
- In office 16 January 2013 – 6 November 2013
- President: Nursultan Nazarbayev
- Prime Minister: Serik Akhmetov
- Preceded by: Office established
- Succeeded by: Bolat Zhamishev

First Deputy Chairman of Nur Otan
- In office 24 September 2012 – 16 January 2013
- Chairman: Nursultan Nazarbayev
- Preceded by: Nurlan Nigmatulin
- Succeeded by: Bauyrjan Baibek

Minister of Economic Development and Trade
- In office 20 January 2012 – 24 September 2012
- President: Nursultan Nazarbayev
- Prime Minister: Karim Massimov
- Preceded by: Kairat Kelimbetov
- Succeeded by: Erbolat Dosaev

Äkim of Pavlodar Region
- In office 30 September 2008 – 20 January 2012
- Preceded by: Kairat Nurpeisov
- Succeeded by: Erlan Aryn

Head of the Prime Minister's Office
- In office 11 December 2007 – 30 September 2008
- Prime Minister: Karim Massimov
- Preceded by: Yerbol Orynbayev
- Succeeded by: Gabidulla Abdrakhimov

Personal details
- Born: 13 October 1963 (age 63) Usharal, Kazakh SSR, Soviet Union (now Kazakhstan)
- Party: Amanat
- Children: 2
- Education: Kazakh National University

Baqytjan Äbdırūly Sağyntaev (Note: Kazakh: Бақытжан Әбдірұлы Сағынтаев, pronounced [b̥ɑχə̆tʒ̊ɑ́n æb̥d̥ɘ̆rʊɫə́ sɑʁə̆ntʰɑ́jɘf]; Russian: Бакытжан Абдирович Сагинтаев, romanized: Bakytžan Abdirovič Sagintajev, IPA: [bəkɨdˈʐan ɐbˈdʲirəvʲɪtɕ səɡʲɪnˈtajef]) (/ˌbɑːkətˈʒɑːn ˌsæɡɪnˈtaɪɛf/ BAH-kət-ZHAHN SAG-in-TY-ef, born 13 October 1963) is a Kazakh politician who was a Prime Minister of Kazakhstan, from 9 September 2016 until his resignation on 21 February 2019. He served as the Äkim of Almaty from 28 June 2019 until he was replaced by Erbolat Dosaev on 31 January 2022 following the 2022 Kazakh unrest which greatly affected the city. He currently serves as Chairman of the Board of the Eurasian Economic Commission.

== Early life and education ==
Sagintayev was born in the village of Usharal. His father, Abdyr Sagintayev (1921–1986), was a World War II veteran who worked as the director of the Talas Sheep Breeding Plant.

In 1985, Sagintayev graduated from the Kazakh State University with a degree in economics. That same year, he became a lecturer at the Department of Political Economy of the Alma-Ata Institute of National Economy. From 1988 to 1992, he worked at the Kazakh State University, where he went from an assistant to an assistant professor of sociology. After Kazakhstan's independence from the Soviet Union, Sagintayev was engaged in entrepreneurial activity.

== Political career ==
In 1998, he was appointed as deputy akim of the Jambyl Region. From 1999 to 2002, Sagintayev served as deputy chairman of the Agency of the Republic of Kazakhstan for Small Business Support, Regulation of Natural Monopolies, Protection of Competition and Support for Small Business. From 2002 to 2004, he served as the First Deputy Chairman of the Agency for Regulation of Natural Monopolies and Competition Protection. On 29 September 2004, Sagintayev was reappointed as the chairman of the Agency for Regulation of Natural Monopolies of Kazakhstan.

On 11 December 2007, Sagintayev was appointed as the Head of the Prime Minister's Office. He served that position until 30 September 2008, when he became akim of Pavlodar Region.

On 20 January 2012, Sagintayev was appointed as Minister of Economic Development and Trade. On 24 September 2012, he became First Deputy Chairman of Nur Otan. On 16 January 2013, Sagintayev was appointed as the First Deputy Prime Minister and Minister of Regional Development.

== Prime Minister of Kazakhstan (2016–2019) ==
On 8 September 2016, Sagintayev was nominated by President Nursultan Nazarbayev for the post of the Prime Minister. The following day, on 9 September, Sagintayev's candidacy was approved by the Parliament. Shortly after on 28 September, he was appointed as the chairman of the Board of Directors of JSC Samruk-Kazyna.

In November 2016, Sagintayev drew attention to the number of reductions in pediatricians in the country. He supported Deputy PM Imangali Tasmagambetov's initiative to restore the faculties of pediatrics in Kazakh medical universities. Sagintayev also instructed to tighten control over the activities of veterinary services and ensure the entry of cattle burial grounds and anthrax burials in the information system of the State Land Cadastre.

In response to inflation, he sought to prevent the continuing rise of food prices for 2017. Despite the promises, the inflation of that year reached 7.1%. In response, Sagintayev blamed local governments for their failure in increased prices of food, suggesting äkıms (local heads) to punish deputy äkıms who he claimed to be responsible for soaring costs.

Sagintayev slowly drew criticism from President Nazarbayev in relation to his policies towards the self-employed population. In October 2018, Sagintayev's cabinet was eventually threatened to be sacked by Nazarbayev who went as far as suggesting being replaced by Singaporean and Japanese officials. On 30 January 2019, at an enlarged meeting of the government, Nazarbayev publicly slammed Sagintayev and his ministers as "cowards".

On 4 February 2019, a fire erupted in an apartment in Astana, killing five children who belonged to a single family. This sparked fury and protests from the mothers who demanded proper housing, more kindergartens and financial support for families owning more than one child. Sagintayev expressed his condolences to the tragedy and told his cabinet to be stricter in fire safety inspection at homes to prevent incidents.

Sagintayev continued to serve as the PM until 21 February 2019 when the government was dismissed due to lack of economic development. He was replaced by Askar Mamin who was appointed as Acting PM until being confirmed by the Parliament on 25 February.

== Post-premiership ==
On 1 March 2019, Sagintayev became the State Secretary of Kazakhstan. He shortly served the position before becoming the head of the Presidential Administration of Kazakhstan on 24 March.

=== Äkim of Almaty (2019–2022) ===
On 28 June 2019, Sagintayev was appointed as the akim of Almaty, outlining his goal in making the city a "safe, comfortable, modern metropolis where every Almaty citizen has the opportunity for a decent life." He ordered the police to conduct an analysis of the criminal situation in the city, to intensify the fight against hooliganism and robbery, and to increase the number of surveillance cameras on the streets. In response with dealing in crimes, 32 police posts were installed, with 4 in each city district. The location of the posts was determined based on the incidents of offenses and crimes that occurred in the area.

Sagintayev announced on his Instagram page on 19 August 2019 about returning the previous speed limit on Al-Farabi Avenue from 60 km back to 80 km after many complains by citizens.

On 29 August 2019, he proposed planting at least a million new trees in Almaty and planned to actively work with the government and Samruk Energy JSC to reduce emissions from stationary sources.

On 27 November 2019, at the Almaty Investment Forum, Sagintayev remarked the city should be at the top 100 best cities in the world in terms of quality of life and business opportunities, in which he used San Francisco as an example.

Sagintayev assessed that the New Almaty project is "one of the important tasks" for the city, which offered businesses to invest in the development of the territory on the outskirts of the city, which would amount to a total of one trillion tenge.

At the annual briefing of the Central Communications Service held on 7 December 2020, Sagintayev announced that the economic situation in the city had been stabilized. He insisted that Almaty retains the potential for rapid recovery in the post-epidemic period and that it remains an international center of investment activity. In response to the fate of Almaty Light Rail, Sagintayev said that the project is underway and that it needs financial model for it to work.

On 29 January 2022, it was speculated that Sagintayev would be dismissed from the post after President Tokayev hadn't rule out in his removal, which he called Sagintayev "a conscientious person in terms of the performance of official duties" although adding that he would take account in regards to the mood by the Almaty residents. On 31 January, Sagintayev's dismissal was made public in which according to a presidential decree, was due to transfer to another unspecified job. He was replaced by Erbolat Dosaev, who served as the National Bank chairman prior.

==== COVID-19 ====
Following the COVID-19 outbreak in Kazakhstan in March 2020, 27 roadblocks were installed to prevent citizens from traveling in or out of the city. On 4 April 2020, Sagintayev approved the construction of an infectious disease hospital, which was opened on 24 April. On 16 April, Sagintayev announced that mass gathering events, including sports, would be cancelled until 30 June.

In May 2020, after the announcement of easing lockdowns nationwide, religious spaces and retailers began functioning in the city with quarantine measures. Roadblocks were lifted on 1 June 2020. Sagintayev–in turn–urged all Almaty residents to wear face coverings. However, after an increase in COVID-19 cases, strict measures were taken with cut in working hours and government employees being instructed to switch to remote work. By 2 September 2020, Sagintayev announced that the situation was stabilized. Telling Almaty citizens to adhere to the mask orders to prevent the rise of cases. In October 2020, he warned of a possible second wave of the infections during a live interview on Almaty TV channel, stating that the city was prepared to deal with new cases if necessary.

Following an increase of cases in the Almaty, Sagintayev announced in new restrictions being placed, noting that the city would not go under lockdown unless there would be a daily growth of more than 100–150 infected persons at the hospitals.

==== 2022 Kazakh unrest ====
During the 2022 Kazakh unrest, Sagintayev addressed Almaty residents regarding the situation, in which he claimed that city had been taken under the control by the authorities and urged everyone not to succumb to "provocations and lawlessness" after riots had broken out on the night of 4 January 2022 which resulted in the state of emergency being introduced.

Despite Sagintayev's words, unrest continued getting worse in Almaty, leading to gunfire exchange in the streets, widespread looting of stores and banks, as well as administrative and television station buildings being burned down. It was reported that Sagintayev on the evening of 6 January had come under gunfire while being inside the car, resulting in his driver being hit by a bullet while Sagintayev was left uninjured, managing to flee the scene with the bullet-stricken driver. According to Sagintayev himself, he claimed that the incident was an assassination attempt, describing it as "organized terrorist actions".

On 8 January 2022, just days after staying out of public eye, Sagintayev made his reappearance at the meeting from where he instructed city officials to start clearing neighbourhoods occupied by the armed militants, as well as normalize the situation with food supply and security.

Following the unrest, a petition calling for Sagintayev's dismissal was launched, upon which gained thousands of signatures in just few hours. From there, Sagintayev was criticized for failing to boost morale to the city residents, refusing to go on air with an appeal and staying out of public for days during the riots. In response, Sagintayev asserted that "every criticism is helpful" and that his understanding of responsibility is to "provide the entire life support system of the city".

=== Eurasian Economic Commission (2024-present) ===
On February 1, 2024, he was appointed Chairman of the Board of the Eurasian Economic Commission.

== Other activities ==
=== Corporate boards ===
- Small Business Development Fund, chairman of the board of directors (2001–2002)
- Kazakhstan Temir Zholy, member of the board of directors (2004–2005)
- KEGOC, member of the board of directors (2004–2006)
- Kazakhtelecom, member of the board of directors (2004–2006)
- Samruk-Kazyna, member of the board of directors (2012)
- KazAgro, chairman of the board of directors (from 2012)
- Kazatomprom, chairman of the board of directors (2015)
- Astana EXPO-2017 (since 2015)
- KazAgro, chairman of the board of directors (2016)
- Kazakhstan Temir Zholy, member of the board of directors (from 2016)
- Samruk-Kazyna, chairman of the board of directors (2016–2019)
- Kazakh Invest, chairman of the board of directors (from 2017)
- Eurasian Economic Commission, Member of the Board (2022)
- Financial and Business Association of Eurasian Cooperation, Chairman Supervisory Board (August 11, 2022)

=== Non-profit organisations ===
- Council of Foreign Investors under the President, member (from 2012, 2016)

== Awards ==
- Order of Parasat (2013)
- Order of Kurmet (2008)
- Medal "20 Years of Independence of the Republic of Kazakhstan" (2011)
- Medal "25 Years of Independence of the Republic of Kazakhstan" (2016)
- Medal "10 Years of the Constitution of the Republic of Kazakhstan" (2005)
- Medal "10 Years of the Parliament of the Republic of Kazakhstan" (2005)
- Medal "10 Years of Astana" (2008)
- Medal "20 Years of Astana" (2018)
- Order of Friendship (Russia, 2014)
- Medal "For Contribution to the Creation of the Eurasian Economic Union", 1st class (Eurasian Economic Union, 2015)

== Personal life ==
He is an author of a number of scientific works, publications on state regulation of the natural monopolies, small and medium business development.

Sagintayev is married and has two children.

== Notes ==
Political offices
Preceded by Karim Massimov	Prime Minister of Kazakhstan; 2016–2019	Succeeded by Askar Mamin
