= Adil Shayakhmetov =

Kazakh politician (born 1956)

- Әділ Шаяхметов

10th Chairman of the National Security Committee
- In office 9 December 2009 – 23 August 2010
- President: Nursultan Nazarbayev
- Preceded by: Amangeldy Shabdarbayev
- Succeeded by: Nurtai Abykayev

Personal details
- Born: 20 January 1956 (age 70) Jambyl Region, Kazakh SSR, Soviet Union

Ädıl Şaiahmetūly Şaiahmetov (Note: Often transliterated as Adil Shayakhmetovich Shayakhmetov through a Russified Romanization of Адиль Шаяхметович Шаяхметов.) (Kazakh: Әділ Шаяхметұлы Шаяхметов; born 20 January 1956) is a Kazakh politician who was the head of Kazakhstan's National Security Committee (NSC) from December 2009 to August 2010.

== Personal life ==
Shayakhmetov was born in the village of Kaganovich in Zhambyl District, Almaty Province. He graduated from the Kazakh Polytechnic Institute named for V. I. Lenin (now Kazakh National Technical University) in 1978. He is married, and has a son and two daughters.

== Career ==
Shayakhmetov began his intelligence career in the KGB's Jezkazgan branch in 1982. He was promoted from NSC deputy chairman to full chairman in December 2009 as a replacement for Amangeldy Shabdarbayev, who was removed from his post for unclear reasons. Shayakhmetov himself was removed from his post in August 2010 in the aftermath of the arrest of Prosecutor-General's Office official Murat Musabekov, who was fingered as allegedly plotting a coup in an anonymous letter allegedly circulated by NSC officers. He was replaced by Nursultan Nazarbaev loyalist and political heavyweight Nurtai Abykayev.
