= Amangeldy Shabdarbayev =

Kazakh politician (born 1950)

- Амангелді Шабдарбаев

9rd Chairman of the National Security Committee
- In office 2 March 2006 – 7 December 2009
- President: Nursultan Nazarbayev
- Preceded by: Nartay Dutbayev
- Succeeded by: Adil Shayakhmetov

Personal details
- Born: 1 August 1950 (age 75) Almaty Region, Kazakh SSR, Soviet Union

Colonel General Amangeldy Shabdarbayev (Kazakh: Амангелді Смағұлұлы Шабдарбаев, Amangeldı Smağūlūly Şabdarbaev; born on 1 August 1950) is a Kazakh military officer who served as the Chairman of the National Security Committee (KNB) from 2 March 2006 to 7 December 2009. He replaced Nartai Dutbayev, and was himself replaced by Adil Shayakhmetov. He graduated from the Kazakh Institute of Physical Training and the KGB Higher School of the USSR in Moscow, USSR with a degree in law.

== Career ==
Shabdarbayev served in the Military of the Soviet Union in 1974.

He joined the State Security Committee of the Kazakh SSR in 1976. He retired from the committee in 1986, after the Zheltoqsan riot. He then served as Deputy Chief of the "Kazneftedorstroy" trust.

He became the Deputy Chairman of the State Investigation Committee in November 1995, and the Head of “A” Service of the KNB in 1997. He previously served as the Head of the Presidential Security Service from January 2002 until Kazakh President Nursultan Nazarbayev promoted him to the head of the KNB on 2 March 2006.

He has received many awards, including the Order of Glory Class I, from the Commonwealth of Independent States.

Deutsche Welle reported on 3 March that "according to politicians and political analysts, Shabdarbaev does not belong to any of the 'influence groups' between which an open confrontation began after the murder of Altynbek Sarsenbayev."

== Arystan board ==
Shabdarbayev fired twenty military officials of the Arystan board on 13 June 2006, saying in an interview with a writer for Russian: Мегаполис (Megacity) weekly, "Considering serious neglect and lack of organization of personnel work, absence of due control over the department board of the Committee staff, certain measures have been taken. The administrative board of the service has been completely renewed. By the results of attestation more than 20 military officials of the special division have been dismissed without restoration right. The officer from executives reserve with experience of operative and personnel work has been appointed a new Arystan Chairman. Military discipline has been taken under rigid control."

== Family ==
He is married and has four children.
