= Kazakhstan's 18th electoral district =

Single-mandate territorial constituency in Kazakhstan

Electoral district No. 18
- Kazakh: №18 сайлау округі Russian: Избирательный округ №18
- Single-mandate constituency for the Mäjilis
- District: Buqar-Jyrau
- Region: Almaty Region (2004–2007); Karaganda Region (2022–present)
- Population: 570,450 (2023)
- Electorate: 382,017 (2023)
- Major settlements: Karaganda (seat)

Current constituency
- Created: 2004; 2022 (re-established)
- Seats: 1
- Party: Amanat
- Deputy: Qudaibergen Beksultanov
- Elected: 2023

The Electoral district No. 18 (Kazakh: №18 сайлау округі, romanized: №18 sailau okrugı; Russian: Избирательный округ №18) is a single-mandate territorial constituency in Kazakhstan, represented in the lower chamber Mäjilis of the Parliament. It is one of two constituencies within the Karaganda Region as its seat is centered in Karaganda, which includes the regional district of Buqar-Jyrau.

The constituency was originally formed for the 2004 legislative election and existed until being abolished in 2007. However, it has been reestablished in 2022 and is currently represented by deputy Qudaibergen Beksultanov (Amanat) since March 2023.

== Geography ==
The Electoral district No. 18 is situated in the territory of Karaganda Region which includes the district of Bukhar-Zhyrau. Its administrative center, Karaganda, serves as the seat of the constituency. The electoral district shares borders with No. 23 (Pavlodar Region) to the northeast along with No. 19 (Karaganda Region) to the north, west, and south.

== History ==
The Electoral district No. 18 was formed for the 2004 legislative election as a result of redistribution originally within the boundaries of Almaty Region, and Erasyl Abilqasymov served as deputy from the constituency. From there, the electoral district continued to exist until its dissolution following the 2007 amendment, which led to the abolition of all constituencies as part of the transition from a mixed-member majoritarian representation to a fully party-list proportional representation system. The change affected the composition of all seats in the lower chamber Mäjilis of the Kazakh Parliament beginning with the 2007 legislative election.

On 24 December 2022, the Electoral district No. 18 was reestablished by the Central Election Commission in the territory of Karaganda Region, which came into effect on 1 January 2023 as a result of the 2022 amendment. The adoption of this amendment marked the reintroduction of a mixed electoral system for electing Mäjilis deputies, with the use of numbered constituencies being reinstated for the first time since 2004. It made its debut in the 2023 legislative election, with Qudaibergen Beksultanov becoming the elected representative of the constituency.

== Deputies ==
| Election | Member | Party | % | Representing region |
|---|---|---|---|---|
| 2004 | Erasyl Abilqasymov | Independent | 64.7 | Almaty Region |
| 2007 | Defunct (Single-nationwide PR constituency) | | | |
| 2012 | Defunct (Single-nationwide PR constituency) | | | |
| 2016 | Defunct (Single-nationwide PR constituency) | | | |
| 2021 | Defunct (Single-nationwide PR constituency) | | | |
| 2023 | Qudaibergen Beksultanov | Amanat | 60.3 | Karaganda Region |

== Election results ==
=== 2023 ===
| Candidate | Party | Votes | % |
|---|---|---|---|
| Qudaibergen Beksultanov | Amanat | 132,471 | 60.26 |
| Mahmut Älipbergenov | People's Party of Kazakhstan | 31,306 | 14.24 |
| Marat Jandäuletov | Independent | 23,178 | 10.54 |
| Jibek Kamali | Independent | 15,755 | 7.17 |
| Gülnär Qadyrova | Independent | 1,853 | 0.84 |
| Aituğan Muqaşev | Independent | 1,841 | 0.84 |
| Nurlan Taubaev | Independent | 1,535 | 0.70 |
| Nurlan Aikeev | Independent | 1,441 | 0.66 |
| Dilaram Omarova | Independent | 1,258 | 0.57 |
| Against all | | 9,187 | 4.18 |
| Total | | 219,825 | 100.00 |
| Valid votes | | 219,825 | 99.05 |
| Invalid/blank votes | | 2,113 | 0.95 |
| Total votes | | 221,938 | 100.00 |
| Registered voters/turnout | | 382,017 | 58.10 |
| Amanat gain | | | |
Source: CEC
