= Foreign Intelligence Service (Kazakhstan) =

External intelligence agency of Kazakhstan

Foreign Intelligence Service of the National Security Committee of the Republic of Kazakhstan
- Қазақстан Республикасы Ұлттық Қауіпсіздік Комитетінің Сыртқы барлау қызметі
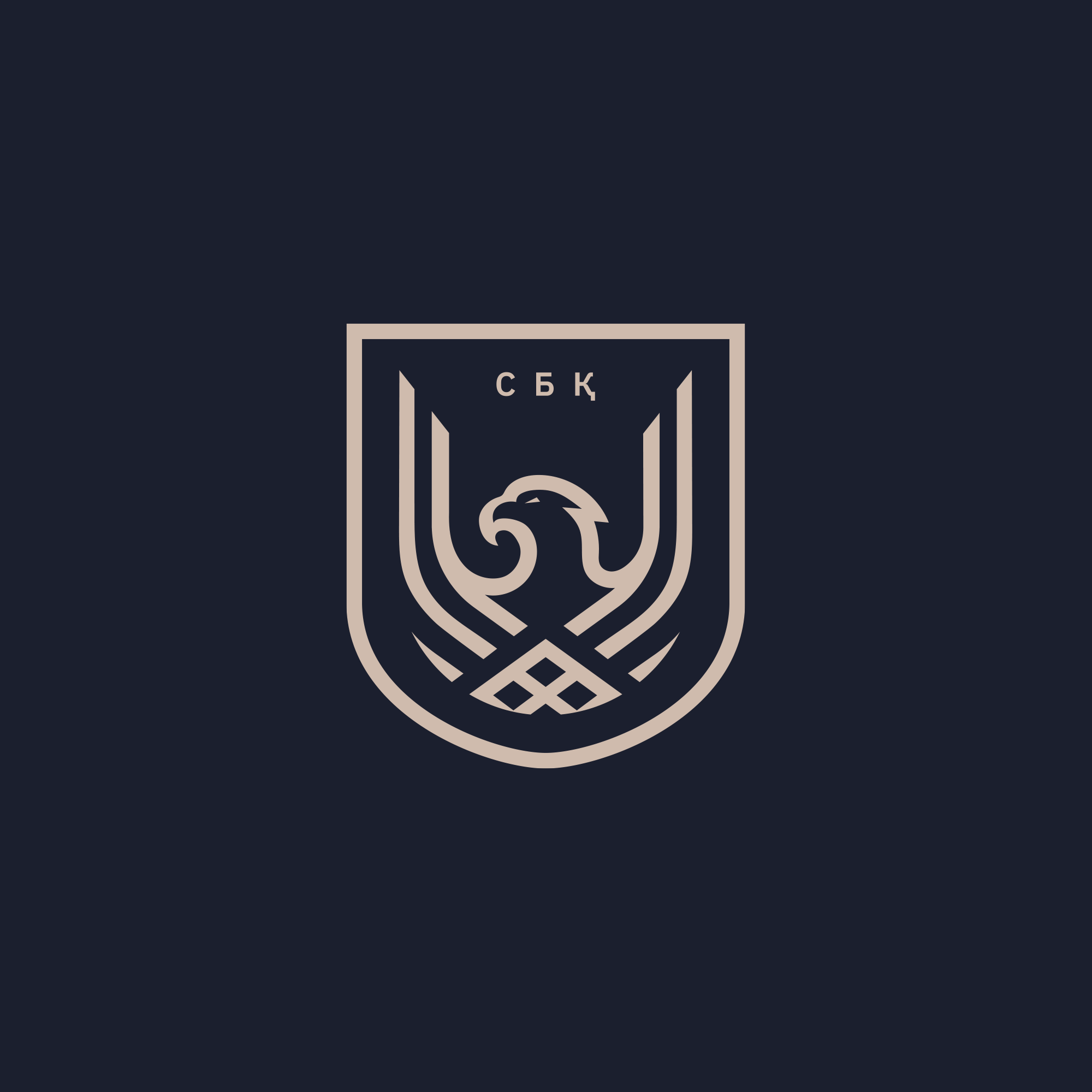
- Official Emblem

Agency overview
- Formed: 15 October 1993
- Jurisdiction: National Security Committee
- Headquarters: Astana, Kazakhstan
- Agency executive: Askar Amerkhanov, Director

The Foreign Intelligence Service of the National Security Committee of the Republic of Kazakhstan (Kazakh: Қазақстан Республикасы Ұлттық Қауіпсіздік Комитетінің Сыртқы барлау қызметі, Qazaqstan Respublikasy Ūlttyq Qauıpsızdık Komitetınıñ Syrtqy barlau qyzmetı) is a special state agency and a vital part of the country’s security system aimed at protecting the sovereignty of the Republic of Kazakhstan. It’s a member of the Intelligence Community of Kazakhstan (along with the foreign intelligence agency of the Ministry of Defense). The Foreign Intelligence Service is headed by the Director of the Foreign Intelligence, currently. The position also doubles as a Deputy Chairman of the National Security Committee.

== History ==
On October 15, 1993, the President of Kazakhstan Nursultan Nazarbayev signed a decree "On the creation of intelligence units in the National Security Committee and the Ministry of Defense of the Republic of Kazakhstan". On November 5, 1997, the Barlau Service was created as an independent foreign intelligence agency under the President of Kazakhstan. Later, as a result of another reform, it became part of the National Security Committee. On February 17, 2009, the Foreign Intelligence Service "Syrbar" (Kazakh: Сыртқы барлау) became directly accountable to the President of the Republic. On June 17, 2019, the Foreign Intelligence Service became part of the National Security Committee by order of President Kassym-Jomart Tokayev

== Tasks ==
The Regulations on the Foreign Intelligence Service authorize the Service to carry out the following:

- Provide the Chairman of the Security Council, the President, Parliament and the Government, state bodies and agencies of Kazakhstan with intelligence and analysis necessary for making decisions in political, financial and economic, military-political, scientific and technical, humanitarian, environmental and other areas affecting the national interests of Kazakhstan;
- Participate in the development and implementation of state policy in the field of national security of Kazakhstan;
- Assist in the implementation of the state leadership’s policy in political, military-political, financial and economic, scientific and technical, humanitarian, environmental and other fields affecting the national interests of Kazakhstan;
- Collect intelligence and implement measures aimed at preventing real and potential threat to the national interests and security of Kazakhstan posed by foreign special services and organizations, terrorist and extremist organizations, criminal communities (criminal organizations), as well as individuals;
- Ensure interaction between the Kazakh state bodies and organizations within the framework of the Intelligence Community of Kazakhstan;
- Provide security for foreign institutions of Kazakhstan, implement measures to protect state secrets and counteract technical intelligence in foreign institutions of Kazakhstan in cooperation with the official representative of the National Security Committee;
- Solve other intelligence tasks in accordance with the laws of Kazakhstan and acts of the President of Kazakhstan.

=== Cooperation with foreign intelligence services ===
An agreement on intelligence cooperation between USA and Kazakhstan was signed in 2010. This secret treaty covers cooperation of the CIA with the Foreign Intelligence Service.

== Directors ==
- Amanzhol Zhankuliyev (February 17, 2009 – February 24, 2015)
- Gabit Baizhanov (2015-2018)
- Gabit Baizhanov (October 8, 2019 – April 3, 2023)
- Askar Amerkhanov (since 3 April 2023)

== Awards ==
In accordance with the Decree of the President of the Republic of Kazakhstan of September 30, 2011 No. 155 "On issues of state symbols and heraldry of departmental and other equated awards of some state bodies directly subordinated and accountable to the President of the Republic of Kazakhstan, the Constitutional Council of the Republic of Kazakhstan, law enforcement bodies, courts, Armed Forces, other forces and military units" the Foreign Intelligence Service can decorate with the following departmental awards:

- Medals:
  - “Syrbar" Qyzmetinin Ardageri” (Veteran of the "Syrbar" Service)
  - Minsiz Qyzmet Ushin" (for irreproachable service) І, II, ІІІ degrees
  - "Syrtqy Barlauga Qosqan Ulesi Ushin" (for contribution to the foreign intelligence)
- Badges:
  - “Syrbar" Qyzmetinin Uzdigi (Excellent employee of the "Syrbar" Service)
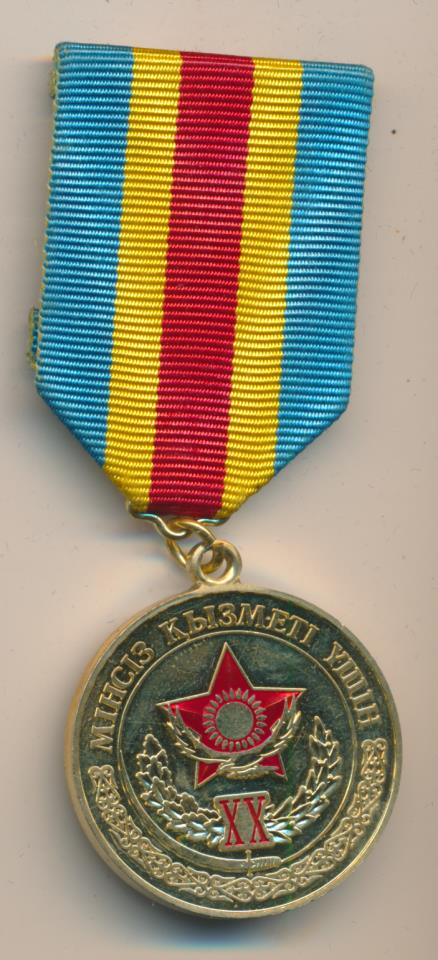
Medal "For Excellent Service", 1st class

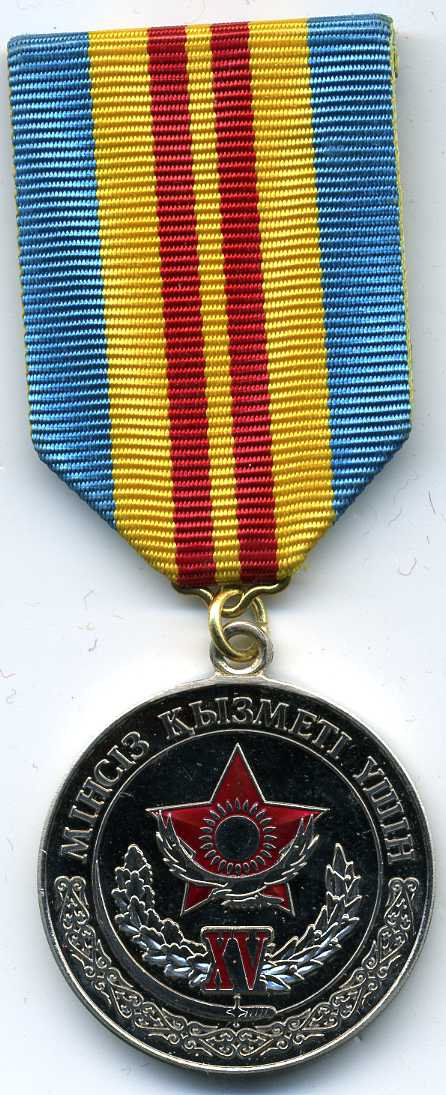
Medal "For Excellent Service", 2nd class

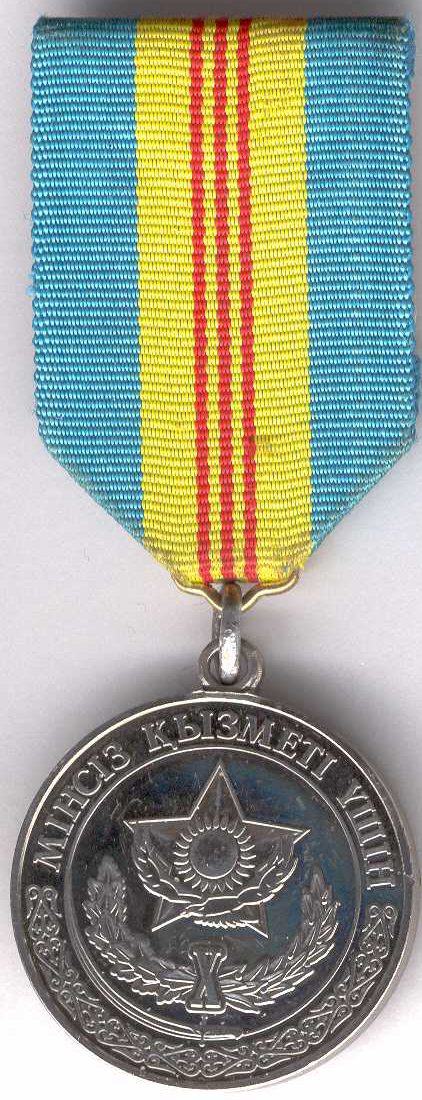
Medal "For Excellent Service", 3rd class

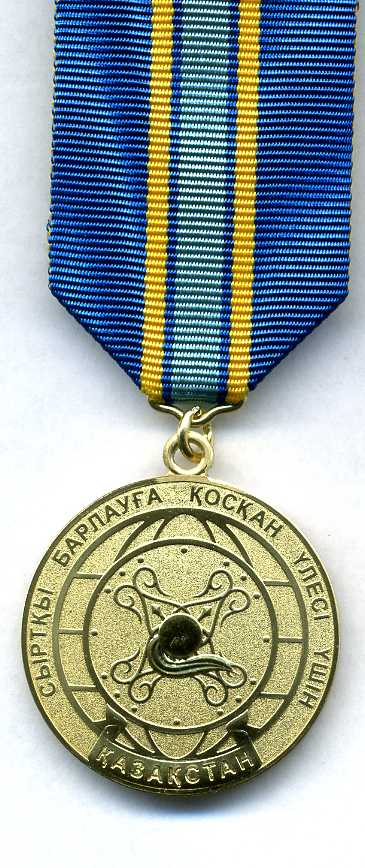
Medal "For Contribution to External Intelligence"

== See also ==
- United States government security breaches
- Foreign Intelligence Service (Russia)
- KGB
