= Marat Irmenov =

Kazakh intelligence officer (born 1971)

Major General Marat Irmenov
- Марат Ирменов

Chairman of the National Security Committee of Kazakhstan
- Incumbent
- Assumed office 16 November 2026
- President: Kassym-Jomart Tokayev
- Preceded by: Ermek Sağymbaev

Deputy Chairman of the National Security Committee
- In office 25 October 2025 – 16 November 2026
- President: Kassym-Jomart Tokayev
- Chairman: Ermek Sağymbaev

Personal details
- Born: 20 September 1971 (age 55)
- Education: West Kazakhstan Agricultural Institute; Institute of the NSC of Kazakhstan; International Academy of Law and Market

Military service
- Allegiance: Kazakhstan
- Service: National Security Committee of Kazakhstan
- Service years: 1996–present
- Rank: National Security Major General

Marat Ğataūllaūly Irmenov (Note: Kazakh: Марат Ғатаұллаұлы Ирменов) (Note: Often transliterated as Marat Gataulovich Irmenov through a Russified Romanization of Марат Гатауллович Ирменов.) (born 20 September 1971) is a Kazakh intelligence officer serving as the Chairman of the National Security Committee since 2026. He also holds military rank of National Security Major General since 2019.

== Biography ==
Marat Ğataūllaūly Irmenov was born on 20 September 1971.

In 1993, he graduated from the West Kazakhstan Agricultural Institute. After graduating from the Institute of the National Security Committee of Kazakhstan (now the NSC Academy) in 1996, he served in operational positions within the national security agencies until 2000. That same year, he graduated from the International Academy of Law and Market in Almaty, an institution whose license was revoked in November 2000.

Details of Irmenov's subsequent career in the NSC are not disclosed in his official biography. According to open sources, he served as First Deputy Head of the Almaty City Department of the NSC until 2016. On 4 July 2016, he was appointed Head of the NSC Department for the Aktobe Region.

Following the February 2020 Dungan–Kazakh ethnic clashes in the Korday District of the Jambyl Region, Irmenov was appointed Head of the Jambyl Regional Department of the NSC on 12 February. During the Kazakh unrest on the night of 5–6 January 2022, a group of up to 350 people armed with firearms and Molotov cocktails attempted to storm the regional NSC headquarters in Taraz. Dastan Adilbay, head of the regional department of the Anti-Terrorist Center, was killed during the attack. On 13 January 2022, Irmenov was transferred back to Almaty to head the NSC department.

In 2025, Kassym-Jomart Tokayev appointed him Deputy Chairman of the NSC of Ermek Sağymbaev.

On 16 November 2026, following the arrests of the chairmen of Samruk-Kazyna and Kazakhstan Temir Zholy, Tokayev dismissed Sağymbaev and appointed Irmenov as Chairman of the National Security Committee.

== Awards ==
- Order of Glory 2nd Class (2022)
- Breastplate "Honorary Officer of the National Security Committee of Kazakhstan"

== Ranks ==
- Colonel (until 2019)
- Major general of National Security (2019)
