= Ermek Sağymbaev =

Kazakh intelligence officer

- Ермек Сағымбаев

Chairman of the National Security Committee
- In office 6 January 2022 – 16 November 2026
- President: Kassym-Jomart Tokayev
- Preceded by: Karim Massimov
- Succeeded by: Marat Irmenov

Head of the State Security Service
- In office 25 August 2021 – 6 January 2022
- President: Kassym-Jomart Tokayev
- Preceded by: Kalmukhanbet Kassymov
- Succeeded by: Saken Isabekov

Personal details
- Born: 11 October 1967 (age 59) Almaty Region, Kazakh SSR, Soviet Union
- Education: Kazakh Polytechnic Institute; Kazakh National University; National Defense University
- Awards: Order of Glory

Military service
- Allegiance: Soviet Union; Kazakhstan
- Service: Soviet Army; State Security Service; National Security Committee
- Service years: 1985–1987; 1994–2026
- Rank: National Security Lieutenant General
- Conflicts: 2022 Kazakh unrest

Ermek Aldabergenūly Sağymbaev (Note: Often transliterated as Ermek Aldabergenovich Sagimbayev through a Russified Romanization of Ермек Алдабергенович Сагимбаев.) (Kazakh: Ермек Алдабергенұлы Сағымбаев, born 11 October 1967) is a Kazakh lawyer, security and intelligence officer who is served as the Chairman of the National Security Committee from 2022 to 2026. He previously served as Head of the State Security Service from 2021 to 2022. He also holds the military rank of National Security Lieutenant General since 2022.

== Early life and education ==
Sağymbaev was born in Almaty Region, Kazakh Soviet Socialist Republic, Soviet Union (now Almaty Region, Kazakhstan) on 11 October 1967.

From 1985 to 1987, he served in the Soviet Army.

In 1992, he graduated from Kazakh Polytechnic Institute (now Kazakh National Technical University) with a degree in electromechanical engineering. In 2007, he earned a law degree from Al-Farabi Kazakh National University. In 2021, he completed a Master's program in national security and military affairs at the National Defense University, specializing in management in the field of state security, earning the academic degree of master of National Security and Military Affairs.

== Career ==
From 1994 to 2006, he held officer positions in the national security agencies. From 2006 to 2019, he served in officer and leadership roles in the Security Service of the President of Kazakhstan.

On 8 May 2019, he was appointed Deputy Head of the State Security Service (SSS), concurrently serving as head of the Presidential Security Service, a unit within the SSS.

On 27 July 2021, he was relieved of his duties as Head of the Presidential Security Service but retained his position as Deputy Head of the SSS.

Nearly a month later, on 25 August, by decree of President Kassym-Jomart Tokayev No. 643, Sağymbaev was promoted to Head of the SSS.

On 6 January 2022, amid nationwide protests and a state of emergency, Ermek Sağymbaev was urgently appointed Chairman of the National Security Committee by Tokayev's decree No. 747, without Senate approval, replacing Karim Massimov, who was arrested on 8 January.

On 28 November of the same year, following the presidential election in which Tokayev was victorious, Sağymbaev was reappointed to the position by Tokayev's decree with Senate consent.

After the new Constitution was adopted in 2026, which gives the president the sole authority to appoint the NSC's chairman,on 24 August 2026, Tokayev reappointed Sağymbaev to the post. Following the arrests of the chairmen of Samruk-Kazyna and Kazakhstan Temir Zholy, Tokayev dismissed him from the post on 16 November 2026.

== Honors and awards ==
- Order of Glory 1st (2026) and 2nd class.
- Medal "For Impeccable Service" 2nd and 3rd class.
- Medal "For valiantly ensuring the safety of Elbasy" (now Medal "For worthy service") 3rd class.

=== Honors ===
- Honorary Officer of the State Security Service.

=== Military rank ===
- Major General of the State Security Service (2020).
- National Security Lieutenant General (2022).
