= Karim Massimov =

Kazakh politician (born 1965)

- Кәрім Мәсімов
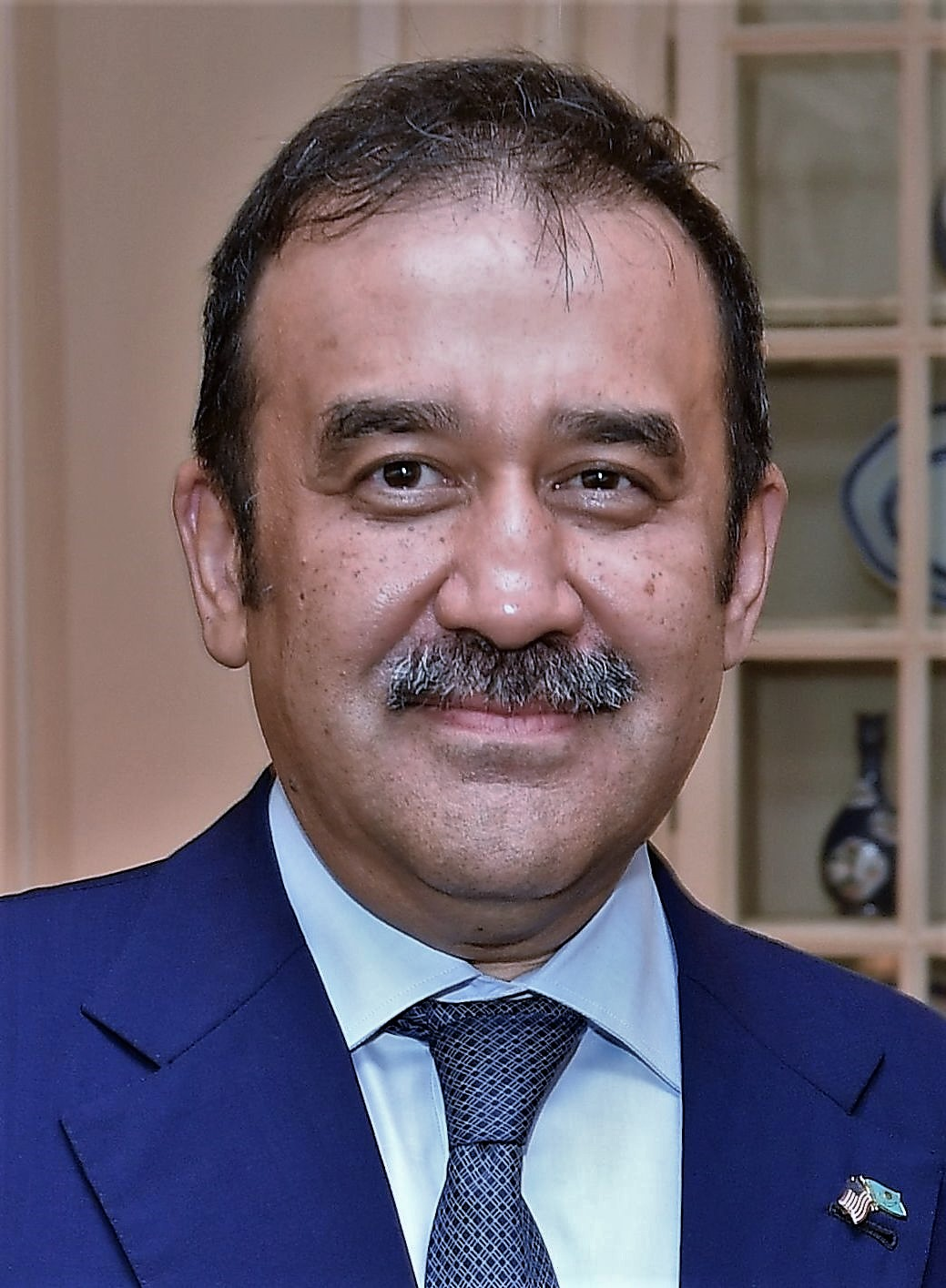
- Massimov in 2017

13th Chairman of the National Security Committee
- In office 8 September 2016 – 5 January 2022
- President: Kassym-Jomart Tokayev; Nursultan Nazarbayev
- Preceded by: Vladimir Zhumakanov
- Succeeded by: Ermek Sağymbaev

Head of the Presidential Administration of Kazakhstan
- In office 24 September 2012 – 2 April 2014
- President: Nursultan Nazarbayev
- Preceded by: Aslan Musin
- Succeeded by: Nurlan Nigmatulin

Acting State Secretary of Kazakhstan
- In office 21 January 2014 – 2 April 2014
- President: Nursultan Nazarbayev
- Preceded by: Marat Tazhin
- Succeeded by: Adilbek Zhaksybekov

7th Prime Minister of Kazakhstan
- In office 2 April 2014 – 8 September 2016
- President: Nursultan Nazarbayev
- First Deputy: Bakhytzhan Sagintayev
- Preceded by: Serik Akhmetov
- Succeeded by: Bakhytzhan Sagintayev
- In office 10 January 2007 – 24 September 2012
- First Deputy: Umirzak Shukeyev (2009–2011); Serik Akhmetov (2012); Krymbek Kusherbayev (2012–2013)
- Preceded by: Daniyal Akhmetov
- Succeeded by: Serik Akhmetov

Deputy Prime Minister of Kazakhstan
- In office 18 January 2006 – 10 January 2007
- Prime Minister: Daniyal Akhmetov
- In office 27 November 2001 – June 2003
- Prime Minister: Kassym-Jomart Tokayev (2001–2002); Imangali Tasmagambetov (2002–2003)

Minister of Economy and Budget Planning
- In office 20 April 2006 – 13 October 2006
- President: Nursultan Nazarbayev
- Prime Minister: Daniyal Akhmetov
- Preceded by: Kairat Kelimbetov
- Succeeded by: Aslan Musin

Minister of Transport and Communications
- In office 7 August 2000 – 27 November 2001
- President: Nursultan Nazarbayev
- Prime Minister: Daniyal Akhmetov
- Preceded by: Serik Burkitbaev
- Succeeded by: Abilay Mirzahmetov

Personal details
- Born: 15 June 1965 (age 61) Astana, Kazakh SSR, Soviet Union
- Party: Nur Otan
- Education: Peoples' Friendship University

Kärım Qajymqanūly Mäsımov (Note: Kazakh: Кәрім Қажымқанұлы Мәсімов, [kʰærɘ̆m qʰɑʒəmqʰɑ́nʊɫə́ mæsɘ̆məf]; Russian: Карим Кажимканович Масимов, romanized: Karim Kažimkanovič Masimov; Tajik: Карим Кожимканович Масимов, romanized: Karim Kozhimkanovich Masimov; Uyghur: ﻛﻪﺭﯨﻢ ﻣﻪﺳﯩﻤﻮﯞ, romanized: Kerim Mesimow, cyrillized: Кәрим Мәсимов) (born 15 June 1965) is a Kazakh politician who served as Prime Minister of Kazakhstan from 2007 to 2012 and again from 2014 to 2016. He was Deputy Prime Minister from 2006 to 2007 and held the positions of Minister of Economy and Budget Planning and Minister of Transport and Communications in 2001. He served as chairman of the National Security Committee from 2016 to 2022.

Massimov, of Tajik and Uyghur descent, graduated from the Republican Physics and Mathematics Boarding School in 1982 and studied Arabic in Russia. He earned a doctorate from Moscow State University in 1999 and worked in business in China and at Almaty Trade and Financial Bank. Politically, he was head of the Ministry of Labour in 1991, Minister of Transport in 2000, and deputy prime minister in 2001, returning to that role in 2006.

Massimov was first appointed Prime Minister by President Nursultan Nazarbayev in January 2007, facing significant challenges during the Great Recession. He oversaw reforms that nearly doubled Kazakhstan's GDP per capita and initiated the Unified National Healthcare System. In September 2012, he was dismissed as prime minister and appointed chief of staff of the presidential office to readjust the power balance within the government. He was reappointed prime minister in April 2014, where he managed further economic difficulties, including a 20% devaluation of the Kazakhstani tenge and falling oil prices, while also leading the 100 Concrete Steps modernization plan.

Massimov later became the head of the National Security Committee in September 2016, a position he held until his dismissal by President Kassym-Jomart Tokayev following the civil unrest in January 2022. Following his removal, he was detained on suspicion of treason and was convicted in April 2024, receiving an 18-year prison sentence for high treason and attempted coup d'état, while providing no evidence backing up these claims from Toqaev. In November 2023, a second criminal case was opened against him for money laundering and large-scale bribery.

== Early life and career ==
Karim Massimov was born to a Muslim family of Tajik and Uyghur roots, in the city of Tselinograd (now Astana, Kazakhstan). He is the son of Eleanor Azhybekova and Qazhymqan Massimov. His father held various managerial positions such as being the director of the Burundai Production Association of Wall Materials, deputy chief of the Glavtopsnab under the Council of Ministers of the Kazakh SSR, director of the Massimov Health Center LLP. In addition, he was president organizations of the National Agro-Industrial Chamber of Kazakhstan and the Kazakhstan Yoga Association.

=== Education ===
In 1982, Massimov graduated from the Republican Physics and Mathematics Boarding School in Alma-Ata. From 1985 to 1988, he studied at the People's Friendship University of Russia where he learned Arabic, then the Alma-Ata Institute of National Economy.

From 1988 to 1989, Massimov studied Chinese at the Beijing Institute of Language, taught at the Wuhan University School of Law from 1989 to 1991, and then Columbia University in New York City. In 1998, he graduated from the graduate school of the Kazakh State Academy of Management. In 1999, Massimov earned a doctoral degree from the Moscow State University of Technologies and Management. That same year, he defended his doctoral dissertation on the topic "Problems of the formation of industry of the Republic of Kazakhstan and ways to solve them (theory and practice)".

=== Business career ===
From 1992 to 1995, Massimov worked at Kazakhstan's commercial structures in China and Hong Kong. From 1995 to 1997 he was the chairman of the Board of the Almaty Trade and Financial Bank. While serving that post, Massimov became an acting chairman of the Board of Turanbank in 1996. From 1997 to 2000, he served as the chairman of the Board of the People's Savings Bank of Kazakhstan.

== Political career ==
In 1991, Massimov became the head of the Department of the Ministry of Labour.

On 7 August 2000, he was appointed as the Minister of Transport and Communications. On 27 November 2001, he became the Deputy Prime Minister of Kazakhstan. Massimov served the post until June 2003, he was appointed as an assistant to the president of Kazakhstan.

Massimov again became the Deputy PM on 18 January 2006, and was simultaneously as the Minister of Economy from 19 April to 13 October 2006.

=== Foreign policy ===
==== China ====
Massimov is considered a China expert. China has become an important strategic partner for Kazakhstan in recent years and the two countries are working closely together to develop Kazakhstan's energy resources. Massimov visited Beijing, China with Finance Minister Natalya Korzhova, Transport and Communications Minister Serik Akhmetov, and Energy and Mineral Resources Minister Baktykozha Izmukhambetov from 16 to 17 November 2006. Massimov co-chaired the third meeting of the China-Kazakhstan Cooperation Committee with Chinese Vice Premier Wu Yi. Several accords between agencies of the two governments were signed. Massimov later met with Chinese Prime Minister Wen Jiabao. Meanwhile, Kazakh President Nursultan Nazarbayev met with Liu Qi, secretary of the Beijing Party Committee, in Astana. Secretary Liu said was "very nice for me to visit your beautiful country at Otan's invitation. The goal of the visit is to deepen cooperation and mutual understanding between our countries."

==== Iran ====
On 28 March 2002, in an article in Izvestia, Massimov announced that the Government of Kazakhstan planned to increase wheat exports to Iran from 100,000 to two million tons.

==== Israel ====
Massimov and Israeli Vice Premier Shimon Peres announced from Jerusalem on 29 October 2006 that the state-owned National Innovation Fund of Kazakhstan would begin investing in the Peace Valley project and other projects in the Middle East. Massimov said, "I came to Israel with a clear message to the nation in Zion from the president, that Kazakhstan is a moderate Muslim state which is interested in being involved in the Middle East. Kazakhstan intends to found political and economic ties with Israel and its neighbors." Massimov mentioned the Dead Sea canal and expressed desire to create a free trade zone. Vice Premier Peres and Massimov agreed to establish an agriculture school in each country. The NIF has given US$10 million to Israeli VC fund Vertex.

Massimov also met with Israeli Prime Minister Ehud Olmert, who praised Kazakhstan for showing a "beautiful face of Islam. Contemporary, ever-developing Kazakhstan is a perfect example of both economic development and interethnic accord that should be followed by more Muslim states."

== Prime Minister of Kazakhstan ==
=== First premiership ===
==== Appointment ====
President Nursultan Nazarbayev nominated Massimov to succeed Daniyal Akhmetov as Prime Minister on 9 January 2007. Akhmetov resigned on 8 January without explanation. Analysts attributed Akhmetov's political downfall to the Nazarbayev's criticism of his administrative oversight of the economy. The Parliament voted overwhelmingly in favor of the nomination on 10 January with 37 out of 39 Senators and 66 of 77 Mäjilis deputies voting for Massimov. Akhmetov became the defense minister, replacing Mukhtar Altynbayev.

==== 2007–2011 ====
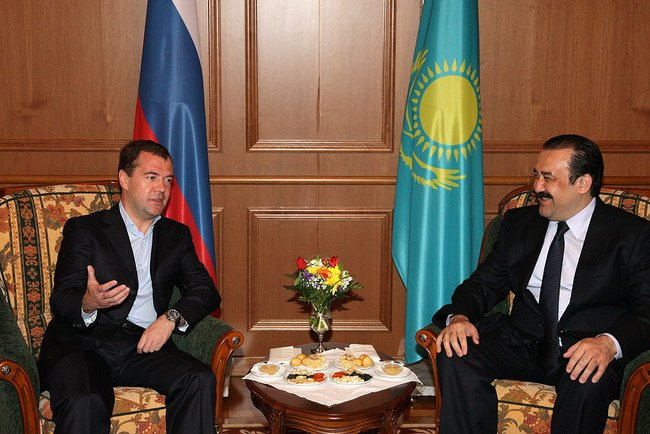
Massimov with President of Russia Dmitry Medvedev on 5 July 2010

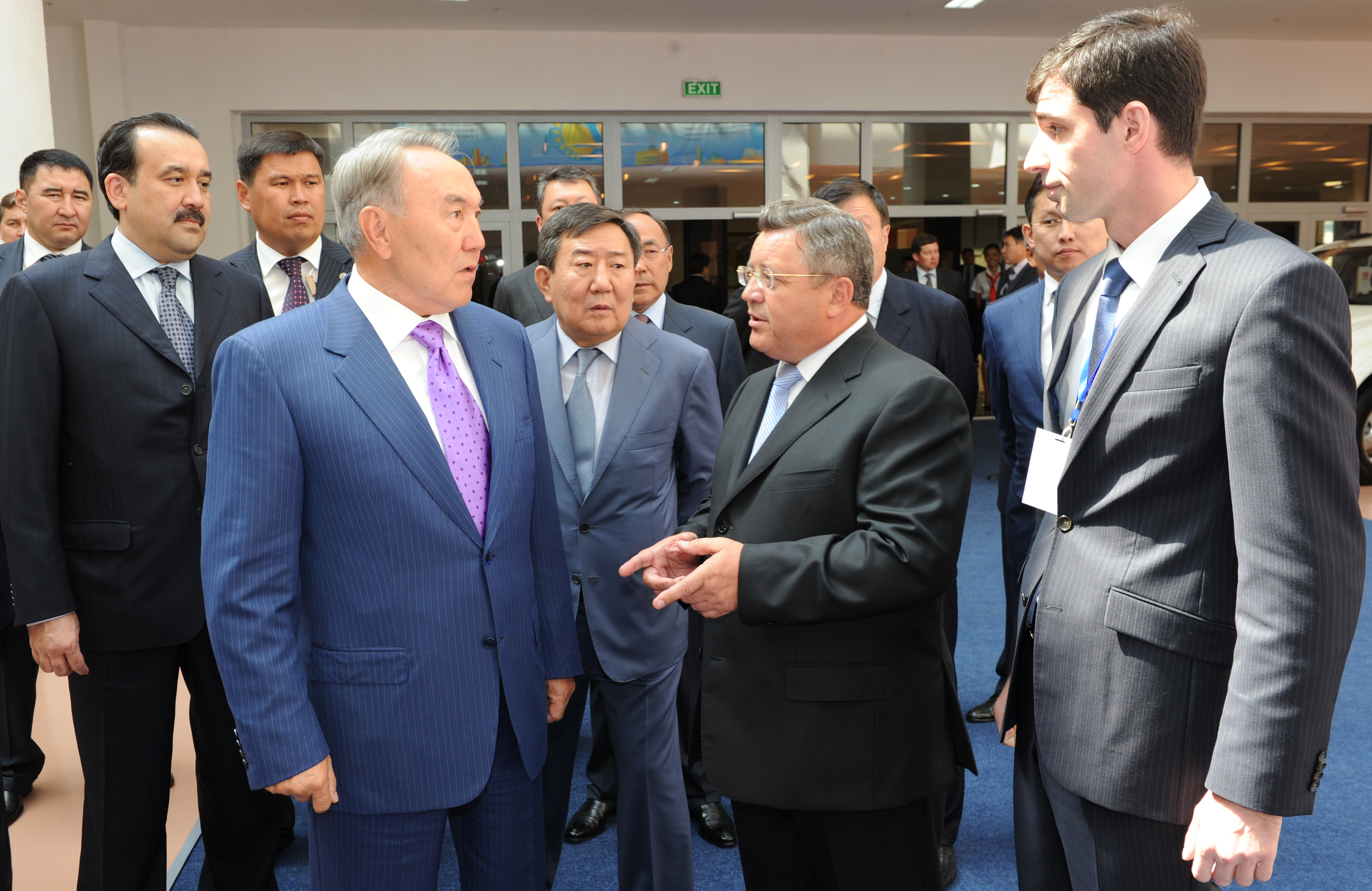
Massimov and Kazakh President Nursultan Nazarbayev on 4 July 2011

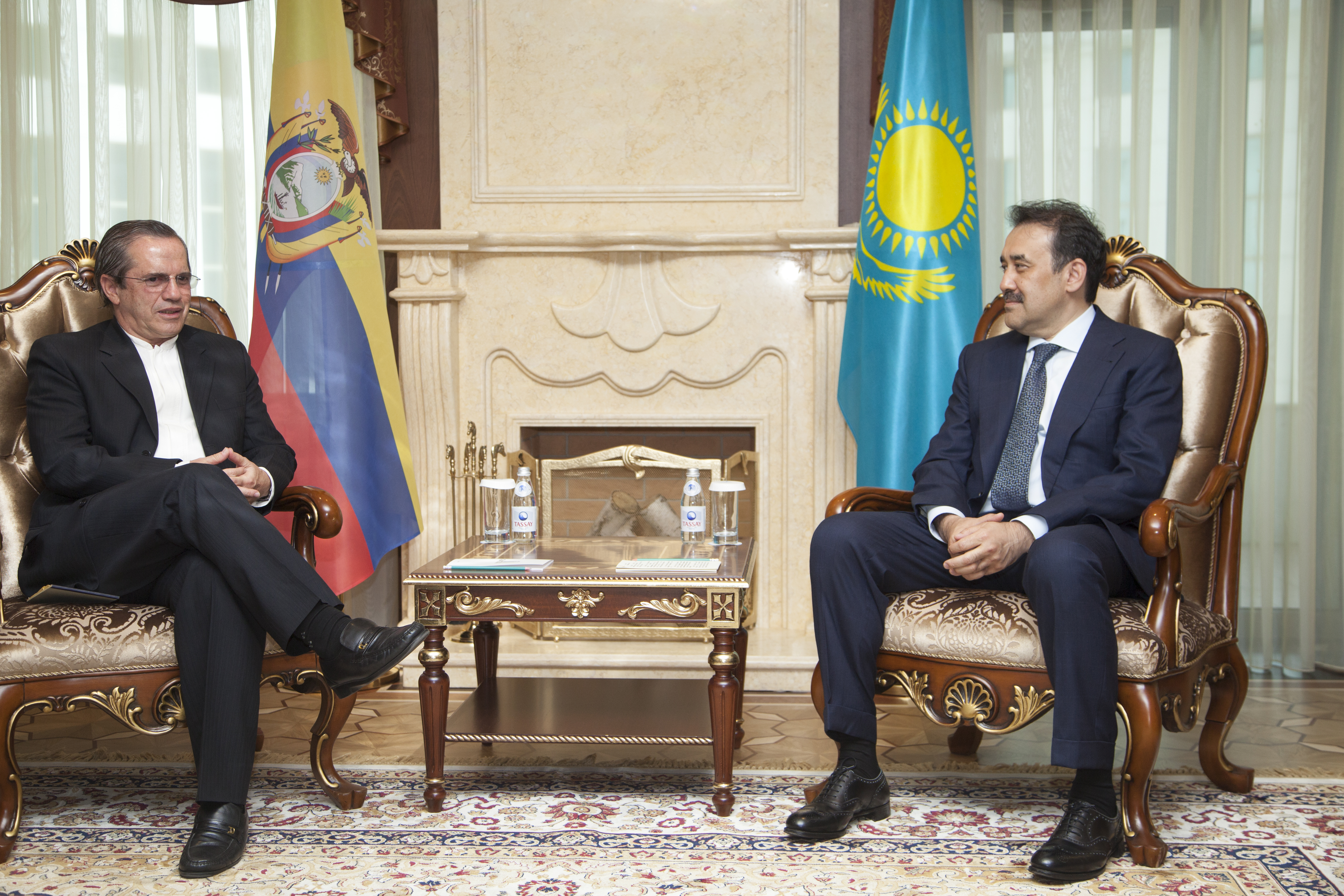
Massimov with Minister of Foreign Affairs of Ecuador Ricardo Patiño on 4 July 2014

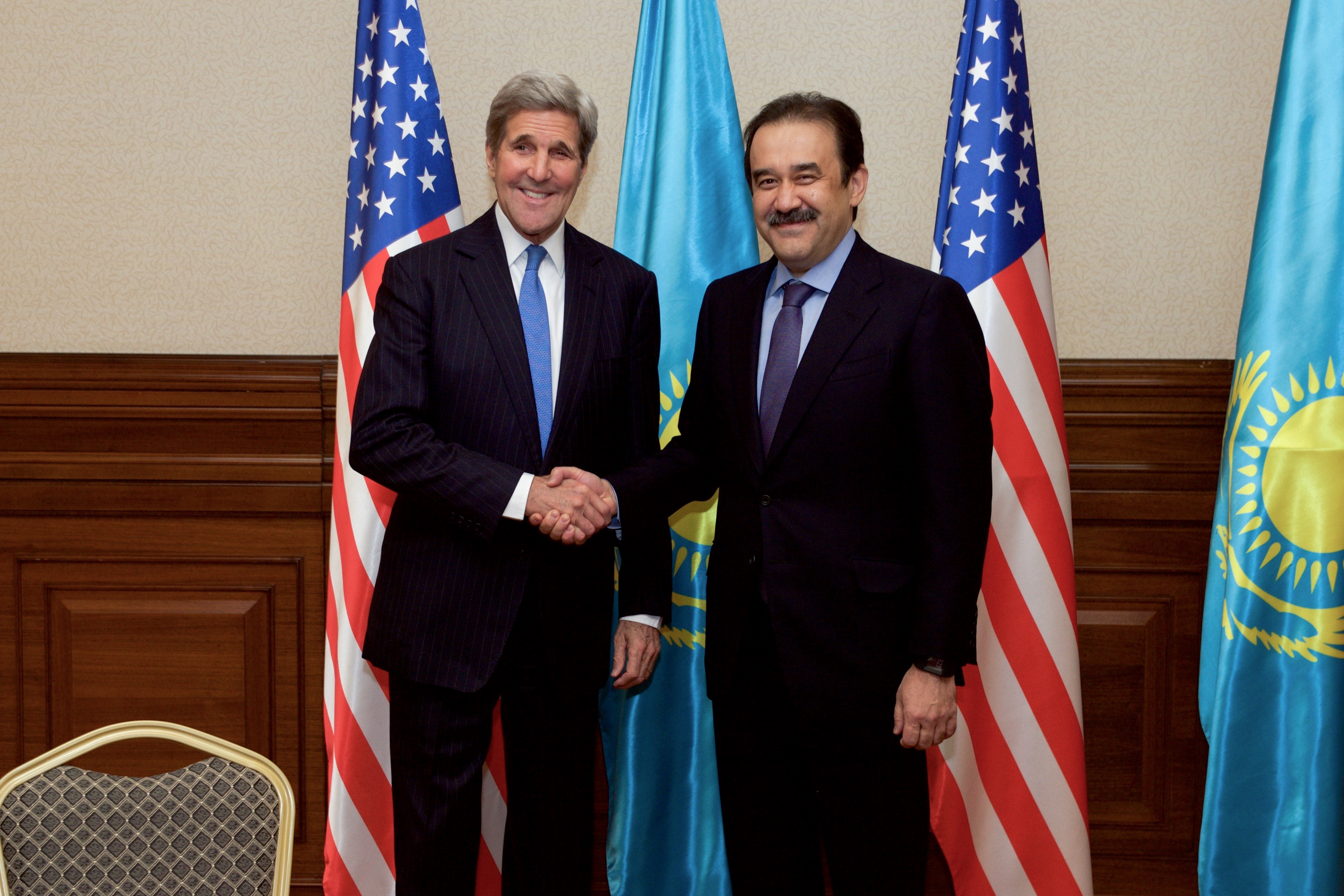
Massimov with U.S. Secretary of State John Kerry on 1 November 2015

In an interview to Echo of Moscow radio in December 2008, Massimov said about himself: "I myself am an Internet user, I myself am a blogger." A couple of months later, he opened his blog on the government's website, explaining the need to provide high-quality, interesting and useful information about the socio-economic situation in the country. From that moment on, members of the government actively went online. Ministers' accounts appeared in many social networks, and virtual blogs have replaced real receptions.

Massimov's government faced the worldwide Great Recession. In February 2009, the National Bank of Kazakhstan devalued the Kazakhstani tenge by 22%. Massimov ordered to stabilize prices in Kazakhstan by instructing law enforcement agencies to ensure that the dollar exchange rate fluctuates within 150 tenge plus or minus 3%. The reforms and strategic interventions pursued by the government almost doubled the GDP per capita of Kazakhstan from 2008–2012, with economic growth rates reaching an average level of 5.5% per year.

The first phase of the Kazakh Unified National Healthcare System was implemented during this time.

==== 2011–2012 ====
After the 2011 presidential election, Massimov's government resigned, and he was shortly reappointed prime minister by Nazarbayev on 8 April 2011.

Massimov was directly involved in the preparation for the 2011 Asian Winter Games, by ordering to make the facilities accessible to ordinary citizens "so that they could improve their sports skills."

On 24 September 2012, Massimov announced his resignation from the post of the PM, which was accepted by President Nursultan Nazarbayev in which he explained "his work fell on the time of the strongest global financial and economic crisis, and our country came out with honor, this is a large part of the merit of the government and the prime minister. When a person is already tired and wants to change his position, and he explains this by the fact that a new man, I heeded this and released him."

=== Second premiership ===
==== 2014–2015 ====
On 2 April 2014, Massimov was reappointed again as the prime minister after replacing Serik Akhmetov. The possible reason was due to the economic troubles under Akhmetov in the country which faced lower GDP growth and devaluation of the tenge by 20% in February 2014 with Massimov having a better experience in running the government for such issues. Massimov was also known for his ability to raise foreign investment.

After the annexation of Crimea by the Russia in March 2014 which resulted in international sanctions against Kazakhstan's main trading partner, Russia, exports between two countries shrank by 24.6%.

In June 2014, Massimov attended the presidential inauguration of Petro Poroshenko on the orders of President Nazarbayev as a way of normalizing Kazakhstan's relations with Ukraine.

==== 2015–2016 ====
Following the 2015 presidential election, Massimov, along with his cabinet, stepped down, and he was subsequently reinstated as prime minister by Nazarbayev on 29 April 2015.

From autumn 2014, the world faced an oil glut which the prices of oil per barrel fell to 4-year low of 82.93$. By August 2015, the tenge lost 20% of its value due to the country's transition to a freely floating exchange rate of the currency. In response to the crisis, Massimov believed that without the intervention from the government, the economy would experience a default with its growth being restored along with an increase in credit and investment activity, creation of new jobs as well as the reduction of inflation. By the end of 2015, the tenge was seen as the most depreciated currency in Europe and the CIS countries with the currency being depreciated by 85.2%.

In the upcoming Expo 2017 event, Massimov visited facilities under construction and controlled the preparation process. During his tenure, a corruption scandal broke out in June 2015 over the company which the officials were accused of embezzling 10 billion ₸. Court hearings lasted several months which resulted in the ex-head of the national company Talgat Ermegiyaev was sentenced to 14 years in June 2016 after being found guilty of embezzling 5.9 billion ₸.

Massimov served as the chairman of the Bid Organizing Committee of Kazakhstan, which presented Almaty as a city for the 2022 Winter Olympics. In his address to the International Olympic Committee, he assured the IOC by saying:

“We are a great opportunity to prove that developing countries can successfully host the Winter Games. We are a great opportunity to give Olympic and Paralympic athletes the true Winter Games experience they deserve and will life. We are a brilliant opportunity to demonstrate the true long-term strength of the Olympic legacy in a region that has never hosted the Games."

Despite Massimov's efforts, Beijing instead in July 2015 was chosen to hold the Olympics, receiving 44 votes against 40 for Kazakhstan.

In September 2015, Massimov's government allowed the prices for the most popular grade of fuel in Kazakhstan, the AI-92, to float freely. From 108 ₸ per liter the price at some gas stations jumped almost to 150 ₸. The price eventually leveled off at around 128 ₸ per liter of fuel. In August 2016, the Kazakh government again deregulated of the fuel and lubricants market and struck diesel fuel from the list of products which maximum prices are set. As a result, the price of diesel fuel almost equaled to AI-92 by rising from 99 ₸ to 110–115 ₸.

Massimov was heavily involved in the 100 Concrete Steps plan as head of the National Modernisation Commission.

The change to a 12-year education system was also brought in during Massimov's tenure as prime minister.

He served that post until he was succeeded by Bakhytzhan Sagintayev.

== Post-premiership ==
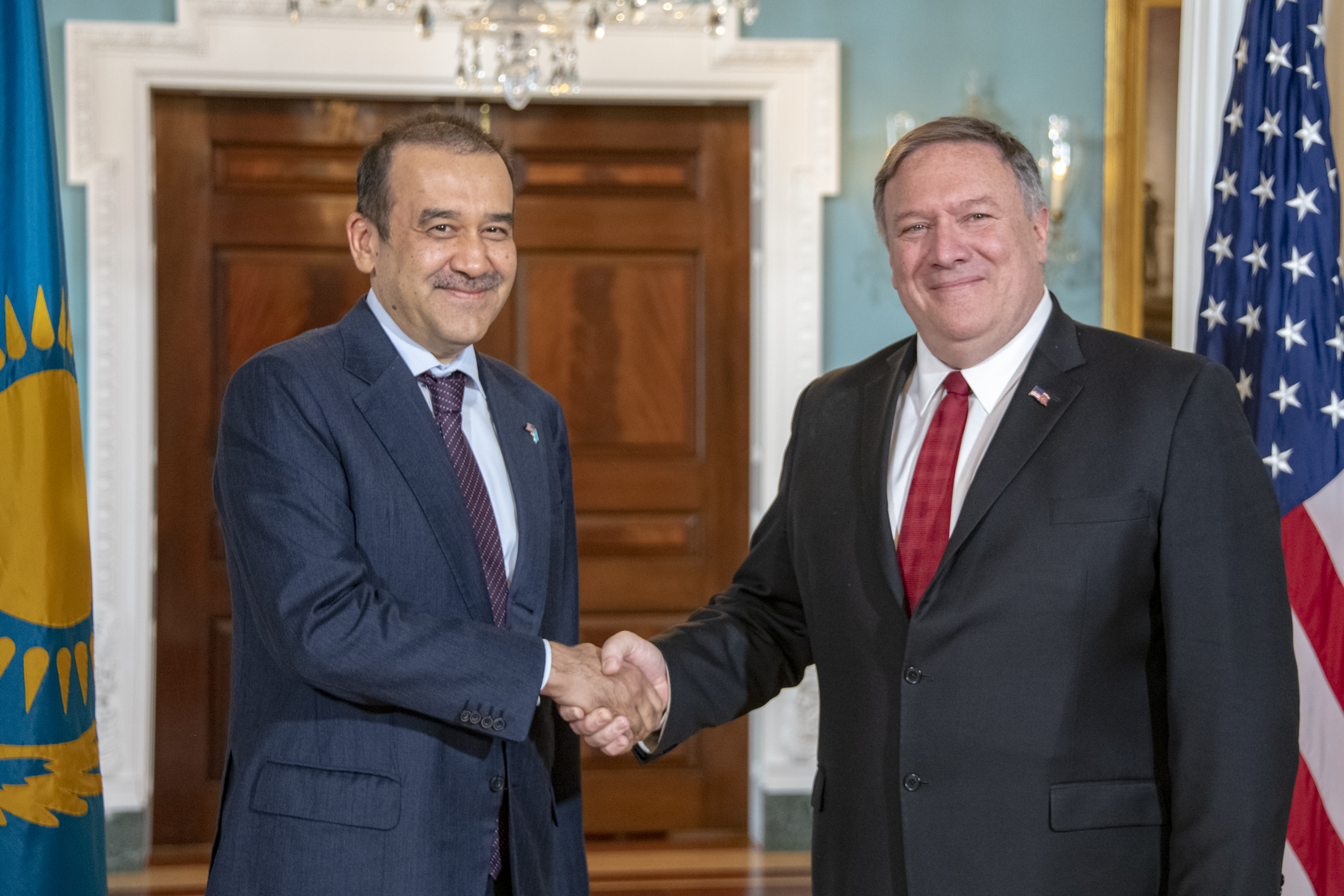
Massimov with U.S. Secretary of State Mike Pompeo on 26 April 2019

After being relieved from his post as the PM, Massimov, while serving as the Head of the Presidential Administration, was also the Acting State Secretary of Kazakhstan from 21 January 2014 to 2 April 2014.

On 8 September 2016, Massimov was appointed chairman of the National Security Committee (NSC) following his dismissal as prime minister.

== Arrest, criminal cases and sentence ==
=== Removal from office and initiation of criminal proceedings for high treason ===
On January 5, 2022, after a meeting of the Security Council, Kazakh president Kassym-Jomart Tokayev dismissed Karim Massimov from the post of Chairman of the National Security Committee amid mass unrest in the country. The next day, he was detained on charges of treason (Article 175, Part 1 of the Criminal Code of the Republic of Kazakhstan) and placed in a temporary detention facility. Instead of Massimov, the former head of Tokayev's state security, Yermek Sagimbayev, became the new head of Kazakhstan's national security.

Kazakh political scientist Daniyar Ashimbayev noted that during the mass riots, not a single unit of the National Security Committee headed by Masimov was noticed at the first stage of the fight against terrorists: “All this suggests that at the very least the KNB either missed this situation, or that some forces within the KNB were involved in creating such an organization (terrorist camps). The Prosecutor General of Kazakhstan claimed that the details of the criminal case and the court hearing were classified as state secrets, and that disclosure of any information concerning foreign policy, counterintelligence and operational-search activities could harm the interests of national security. However the Prosecutor General didn't neglect to proclaim that organized criminal groups recruited and armed people and purchased radios and transport.

The prosecution alleged that during the riots Masimov and Deputy Director of the Special Forces Service "A" Sadykulov ordered their subordinates to leave the KNB buildings leaving them to be looted by militants who seized weapons that were used against civilians and unarmed law enforcement officers.

An investigation into the fact that Masimov received an elite guest house and a land plot in the capital worth about 2.5 billion tenge from one of the business structures during his tenure as prime minister. After Masimov's arrest, in January 2022, 17.2 million US dollars in cash were seized in this guest house, as well as numerous luxury items – luxury watches, gold bars, antiques and much more. Eleven expensive business class cars belonging to him were also seized, the KNB noted. Property has been seized – two luxury apartments in Nur Sultan, two apartments and a mansion in Almaty, as well as a 1-hectare plot of land on the lake shore in the Shchuchinsk-Borovskaya resort area. $5.1 million were seized from Masimov's associates. The state also accused Massimov of owning properties in the United States.

On October 25, 2022, the UN Working Group considered the possibility of releasing Mr. Massimov and conducting an independent investigation. But the state prosecutors refused to comply, citing national security reasons.

=== Verdict in the case of high treason ===
At the beginning of 2023, the Prosecutor General of Kazakhstan, Berik Asylov, named Masimov as the main organizer of mass riots in early January 2022.

On 24 April 2023, the specialized interdistrict criminal court of Astana found the former chairman of the National Security Committee of Kazakhstan guilty of high treason, violent seizure of power, abuse of power and sentenced him to 18 years in prison with confiscation of property and a lifelong ban on holding positions in the civil service. Together with Masimov, Anvar Sadykulov, Daulet Ergozhin and Marat Osipov were convicted, who were sentenced to terms of 16, 15 and 3 years in prison, respectively, and were deprived of the rank of general and state awards.

=== Criminal case of money laundering and bribery on an especially large scale ===
In November 2023, a second criminal case was opened against Masimov for legalization, laundering of money obtained by criminal means, and receiving bribes on a particularly large scale. It was previously reported that during the investigation, numerous signs of corruption were established, in particular, the National Security Committee reported that Masimov illegally received real estate, expensive gifts, and significant funds from representatives of the Kazakh business community and foreign entities. At the same time, an investigation was launched into receiving a bribe in the amount of $2 million from representatives of a foreign state.

== Personal life ==
Karim Massimov is ethnically Uyghur and is a born citizen of Kazakhstan. He is fluent in Kazakh, Russian, Chinese, English and Arabic. He is thought to be well connected within the Kremlin.

Massimov is married and has three children. His interests include reading books, Muay Thai, skiing, rock climbing and golf.

=== Martial arts ===
Massimov was the president of Federation of Amateur Muaythai of Asia (FAMA) in 2010. The FAMA and the Continental Federation of International Federation of Muaythai Amateurs (IFMA) in Asia is the first Continental Federation since 1991, supporting the work and efforts of the IFMA. He then was nominated and went on to assume the position of Vice President of the IFMA, President of Muaythai federation in Kazakhstan and vice-president of World Muaythai Council (WMC).

In 2012, Massimov was unanimously re-elected for another four-year term to head the Asian federation, which is recognised by the Olympic Council of Asia. He showed his support for the sport in an interview in which he stated that the sport "brings together athletes from across the world to train and compete with honour and in the spirit of cultural exchange and understanding."

== See also ==
- Government of Kazakhstan

== Notes ==
Political offices
Preceded by Daniyal Akhmetov	Prime Minister of Kazakhstan; 2007–2012	Succeeded by Serik Akhmetov
Preceded by Serik Akhmetov	Prime Minister of Kazakhstan; 2014–2016	Succeeded by Bakhytzhan Sagintayev
