= Natalya Korzhova =

Kazakhstani politician

Natalya Artyomovna Korzhova (née Poliychuk, Russian: Наталья Артёмовна Коржова; born 8 April 1958) is a Kazakh politician, who served as Minister of Finance.

== Gambling restrictions ==
The Security Council of Kazakhstan ruled on 13 November 2006 to restrict organized gambling in Kazakhstan to Kapchagai and Shchuchinsk after 1 January 2007. Minister Korzhova said the Parliament of Kazakhstan is considering banning casinos outside of those two cities and regional governors will offer other economic opportunities to casino owners in return for shutting down their businesses. President Nursultan Nazarbayev signed a law on 12 January 2007 establishing the "legal foundations for organizing the gambling business in Kazakhstan" restricting gambling to the Shchuchinsko-Borovskaya resort area and on the right bank of the Kapshagai water reservoir after 1 April 2007. The law mandates that all casinos must have video surveillance systems with footage kept seven days after taping. Every casino must have a gambling license and at least 20 green cloths and 50 slot machines.

== Trip to China ==
She traveled with Deputy Prime Minister Karim Masimov, Transport and Communications Minister Serik Akhmetov, and Energy and Mineral Resources Minister Baktykozha Izmukhambetov to Beijing, China from 16 to 17 November 2006 in an effort to boost bilateral relations.

== Eurasian Development Bank ==
The Majilis ratified an agreement with the Eurasian Development Bank on 21 December 2006. Korzhova praised the deal for securing the EDB's "status as an international institution." Russian president Vladimir Putin and Kazakh president Nursultan Nazarbayev created the EDB in January 2006, funded with donations from Russia amounting to USD $1 billion and Kazakh donations amounting to US$500 million.
