= Ministry of Labour (Kazakhstan) =

Government ministry of Kazakhstan

- Еңбек министрлігі
- Emblem of Kazakhstan

Agency overview
- Formed: 14 March 1991
- Dissolved: 11 November 1996
- Superseding agency: Ministry of Labour and Social Protection of the Population
- Jurisdiction: Government of Kazakhstan
- Headquarters: Almaty, Kazakhstan

The Ministry of Labour (Kazakh: Еңбек министрлігі, romanized: Eñbek ministrlıgı) was a government agency in Kazakhstan that existed from 1991 to 1996. It was established on 14 March 1991 after a Presidential Decree No. 281 "On the transformation of the State Committee of the Kazakh SSR on labor and social issues to the Ministry of Labour of the Kazakh SSR". The ministry existed until November 1996, when it was along with the Ministry of Social Protection formed into Ministry of Labour and Social Protection.

== List of ministers ==
- Saiat Beisenov (14 March 1991 – 24 November 1993)
- Viktor Sobolev (24 November 1993 – 11 October 1994)
- Peter Krepak (13 October 1994 – 11 November 1996)
