= Serik Akhmetov =

Kazakh politician (born 1958)

- Серік Ахметов
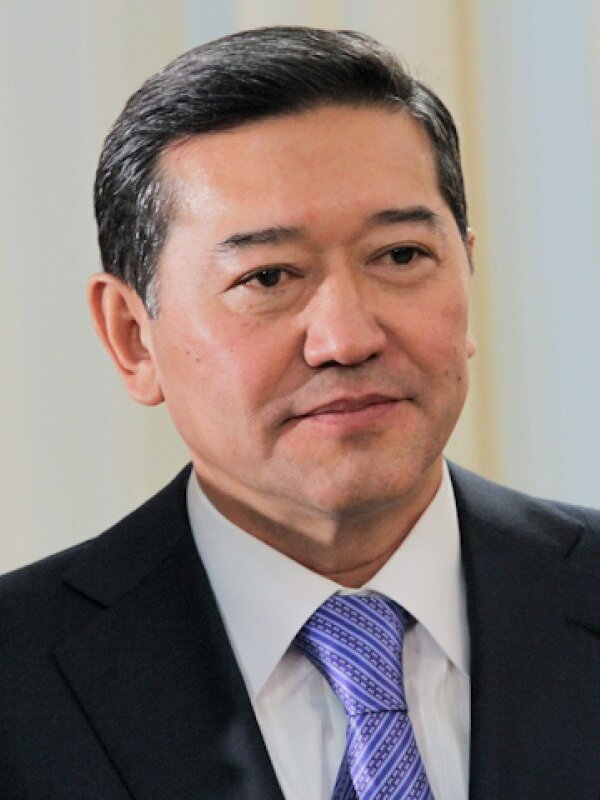
- Akhmetov in 2013

8th Prime Minister of Kazakhstan
- In office 24 September 2012 – 2 April 2014
- President: Nursultan Nazarbaev
- Preceded by: Kärim Mäsimov
- Succeeded by: Kärim Mäsimov

First Deputy Prime Minister of Kazakhstan
- In office 20 January 2012 – 24 September 2012
- Prime Minister: Kärim Mäsimov
- Preceded by: Ömirzaq Shökeev
- Succeeded by: Qyrymbek Kösherbaev

Deputy Prime Minister of Kazakhstan
- In office 3 March 2009 – 16 November 2009
- Prime Minister: Kärim Mäsimov

Minister of Defense
- In office 3 April 2014 – 22 October 2014
- President: Nursultan Nazarbaev
- Prime Minister: Kärim Mäsimov
- Preceded by: Ädilbek Zhaqsybekov
- Succeeded by: Imanghali Tasmaghambetov

Minister of Transport and Communications
- In office 25 September 2006 – 3 March 2009
- President: Nursultan Nazarbaev
- Prime Minister: Kärim Mäsimov
- Preceded by: Asqar Mamin
- Succeeded by: Äbilghazy Qusaiynov

Äkim of Qarağandy Region
- In office 19 November 2009 – 20 January 2012
- Preceded by: Nurlan Nyghmatulin
- Succeeded by: Äbilghazy Qusaiynov

Äkim of Temirtau
- In office March 2001 – 8 July 2003
- Preceded by: Baldyrgan Musin
- Succeeded by: Oral Bitebaev

Personal details
- Born: 25 June 1958 (age 67) Temirtau, Kazakh SSR, Soviet Union (now Kazakhstan)
- Party: Amanat

Serik Nyghmetūly Akhmetov (Note: Kazakh: Серік Нығметұлы Ахметов, romanized: Serik Nyğmetūly Ahmetov, [sʲerɘ̆k nəʁmʲétʰʊɫə́ ɑχmʲétʰəf]; Russian: Серик Ныгметулы Ахметов, romanized: Serik Nygmetuly Akhmetov) (born 25 June 1958) is a Kazakh politician and economist, who was Prime Minister of Kazakhstan from 2012 to 2014. He served as the Minister of Defense from April to October 2014.

Akhmetov served for a time as first deputy äkim of Astana before being appointed to government as Minister of Transport and Communications on 25 September 2006. He has also served as Chairman of the Board of the Atameken National Union of Entrepreneurs and Employers of Kazakhstan since 2005. From March 2009, Akhmetov served as Deputy Prime Minister before becoming the akim of Qarağandy Region in November 2009. In January 2012, he was appointed as the First Deputy Prime Minister before becoming PM following the resignation of Kärim Mäsimov on 24 September 2012.

In November 2014, Akhmetov was arrested after being accused of committing a crime while serving as an äkim of Qarağandy Region to which he was convicted in December 2015. He was eventually released in September 2017.

== Early life and career ==
Akhmetov was born in the town of Temirtau. In 1985, he graduated from the plant-technical educational institution at the Karaganda Metallurgical Combine with a degree in metallurgical engineering, and in 1993, from the postgraduate course of the State University of Management, earning a doctorate in economics.

Akhmetov began his career in 1975 as a turner apprentice, then worked as a turner at the Karmetkombinat. From 1976, he served in the Soviet Army. In 1978, Akhmetov returned to the Karmetkombinat as a turner where he was elected as a Secretary of the Komsomol Committee of the Plant in 1983.

In 1985, he was elected the First Secretary of the Temirtau City Committee of LKMSK and from 1986, as the First Secretary of the Karaganda Regional Committee of the Komsomol. From 1989, Akhmetov was the organizer of the Karaganda Regional Party Committee.

In 1993, he was appointed head of the Marketing Bureau, then head of the Department of Foreign Economic Relations of the Karmetkombinat. Akhmetov also headed the Futau Joint Venture. In 1995, Akhmetov became the general director of the Ken Dala Agro-Industrial Exchange, becoming president of the reorganized exchange in 1996.

From 1998 to 2001, Akhmetov served as a state inspector of the Organizational and Control Department of the Administration of the President of Kazakhstan. In 2001, he was appointed as the akim of Temirtau and then in 2003 as the first deputy akim of Astana.

In 2004, he became the head of the State Inspectorate of the Office of Organizational Control Work and Personnel Policy of the Administration of the President. From 2005, Akhmetov served as an executive director, then chairman of the board of the Atameken National Union of Entrepreneurs and Employers of Kazakhstan.

On 25 September 2006, he was appointed as a Minister of Transport and Communications.

On March 3, 2009, he was appointed Deputy Prime Minister of the Republic of Kazakhstan.

August 19, 2009 concurrently appointed to the position of Chairman of the Board of Directors of Kazakhstan Engineering.

On November 19, 2009, by the Decree of the President of the Republic of Kazakhstan, he was appointed Akim of the Karaganda region.

Since January 20, 2012 - First Deputy Prime Minister of the Republic of Kazakhstan.

Since September 24, 2012 - Prime Minister of the Republic of Kazakhstan.

April 2, 2014 - President of Kazakhstan Nursultan Nazarbayev accepted Akhmetov's resignation.

From April 3 to October 22, 2014 - Minister of Defense of the Republic of Kazakhstan.

=== Russia ===
Akhmetov met with Igor Levitin, the Russian Transport Minister on 25 October 2006. Akhmetov proposed building a transport corridor using preexisting roads from southern Kazakhstan through Kazan and Orenburg to St. Petersburg. Minister Levitin said the Russian Government would consider the proposal, but that it wanted the corridor to go through Chelyabinsk. They discussed the "transit of planes from Asia to Europe" and transportation through the Caspian Sea. Levitin plans on making a working trip to Aqtau to further discuss sea transportation. On 9 November Akhmetov and Levitin met in Aqtau, signing an agreement creating a train and ferry link between Aqtau and Makhachkala ports. The first ferry will carry 52 freight cars of grain and oil products on 10 November.

=== China ===
He traveled with Deputy Prime Minister Karim Masimov, Finance Minister Natalya Korzhova, and Energy and Mineral Resources Minister Baktykozha Izmukhambetov to Beijing, China from 16–17 November 2006 to boost bilateral relations.

== Political career ==
On 4 March 2009, Akhmetov was appointed as the Deputy Prime Minister of Kazakhstan. While serving the post, he was concurrently appointed to the post of chairman of the Board of Directors of Kazakhstan Engineering on 19 August 2009.

On 19 November 2009, by the Decree of the President, Akhmetov was appointed as the äkim of the Karaganda Region. He was then the First Deputy Prime Minister from 20 January 2012.

=== Prime Minister of Kazakhstan (2012–2014) ===
On 24 September 2012, Akhmetov appointed as the Prime Minister of Kazakhstan. Upon taking office, Akhmetov spoke at the Central Office of the Nur Otan at an expanded meeting of the parliamentary faction on 4 October 2012 where he informed the MP's about the forecast of the country's socio-economic development for 2013–2017, and the priorities of budget expenditures for 2013–2015 years. He outlined five areas for the implementation of social and economic policy aimed at achieving the planned growth parameters. Among the main priorities of the Government were ensuring macroeconomic stability, sustainable economic growth, social modernization, regional development, as well as the modernization of the public administration system and improvement of the quality of public services. In early 2013, utility tariffs increased in almost all regions due to the need of infrastructure renovation and lack of investment according to the Government, this move however was met with criticism.

On 16 January 2013, the Ministry of Regional Development was formed, as well as the up-to-date law on local self-government and amendments to the "Development of Regions" program were adopted, allowing the urbanization process to be less spontaneous and be under control. This gave äkims the responsibility of implementing results of each programs with the amount of tenge being spent.

In May 2013, Akhmetov's government was instructed by President Nursultan Nazarbayev to implement a new pension reform. In an interview, he said “in accordance with the instruction of the head of state, the concept should provide for joint responsibility of the state, employer and employee for the level of social protection of Kazakhstanis.” However, the law proposal by Labour and Social Protection Minister Serik Abdenov to increase the retirement age for women from 58 to 63 sparked discontent among Kazakh citizens as well as criticism from Nazarbayev himself who called for the postponement for the increased pension age. A comprised was eventually formed with bill drafting changed and Abdenov being dismissed from his post on 10 June 2013. Nazarbayev approved the law on 21 June.

By the end of 2013, Kazakhstan's nominal GDP reached a record breaking 236.6 billion, making it the biggest in Central Asia. However, Akhmetov's government faced little success as the Kazakhstani tenge plunged by 19% against United States dollar on 11 February 2014. This led to rare protests across the country and rumours on social media about how the Kazakh banks were on verge of collapse resulting in masses of people withdrawing their savings. On 14 February, Akhmetov announced that the government would set price controls for socially important products, fuels and lubricants.

On 2 April 2014, Akhmetov resigned from office as the PM. He continued to serve as the Minister of Defense in Massimov's cabinet from 3 April to 22 October 2014.

== Arrest and imprisonment ==
On 19 November 2014, the court of Kazybek Bi district of Karaganda, Akhmetov was accused of committing a crime under Article 176 of the Criminal Code of the Republic of Kazakhstan. As a result, he was placed under a house arrest.

Akhmetov was convicted of corruption and given a ten-year prison sentence on 11 December 2015. Of the 21 people involved in the case, 12 filed an appeal against the verdict, including Akhmetov himself. On 10 March 2016, Akhmetov's lawyer, Nikolai Lesnik, announced in court an addendum to the appeal. In particular, he said that Akhmetov admitted his guilt in the fact that, being the akim of the Karaganda Region and the PM of Kazakhstan, he did not watch the individuals who committed the theft of budget funds in the Karaganda Region. Akhmetov asked the appellate panel of the regional court to acquit him.

In addition, shortly before the start of the consideration of the appeal, the friends and brother of Serik Akhmetov fully reimbursed the material damage to the state for all the convicts. During the main trial in the court of first instance, Berik Akhmetov contributed 70 million tenge to the government's reserve. 360 million tenge was contributed by the director of Trade House StalZinc LLP. After the verdict, another 1 billion and 825 million tenge were paid off by Serik's friends. In total, the state was compensated for damage in the amount of 2.2 billion tenge.

In this regard, the appellate board of the Court of the Karaganda Region softened the term of imprisonment. Instead of 10 years in prison, approved by the judge of first instance, Akhmetov was sentenced to 8 years in prison. On 29 March 2016, the Akhmetov was transferred to correctional facility AK 159/18 in the Karabas settlement to serve his sentence.

He was released from prison after two years with restrictions on 21 September 2017.

== Personal life ==
Akhmetov is married and has two children. He is fluent in English, Russian and Kazakh.

In 2015, for the false Internet post about Akhmetov's death, Jandos Baishemirov, the notorious Kazakhstani blogger, a political critic of the government was detained. Many independent human rights and freedom of speech organizations have noted that the harassment of a blogger did not meet UN democratic standards.

== Notes ==
Political offices
Preceded by Karim Massimov	Prime Minister of Kazakhstan; 2012–2014	Succeeded by Karim Massimov
