= Ministry of Regional Development (Kazakhstan) =

Government ministry of Kazakhstan

Ministry of Regional Development of the Republic of Kazakhstan
- Қазақстан Республикасы Өңірлік даму министрлігі
- Emblem of Kazakhstan

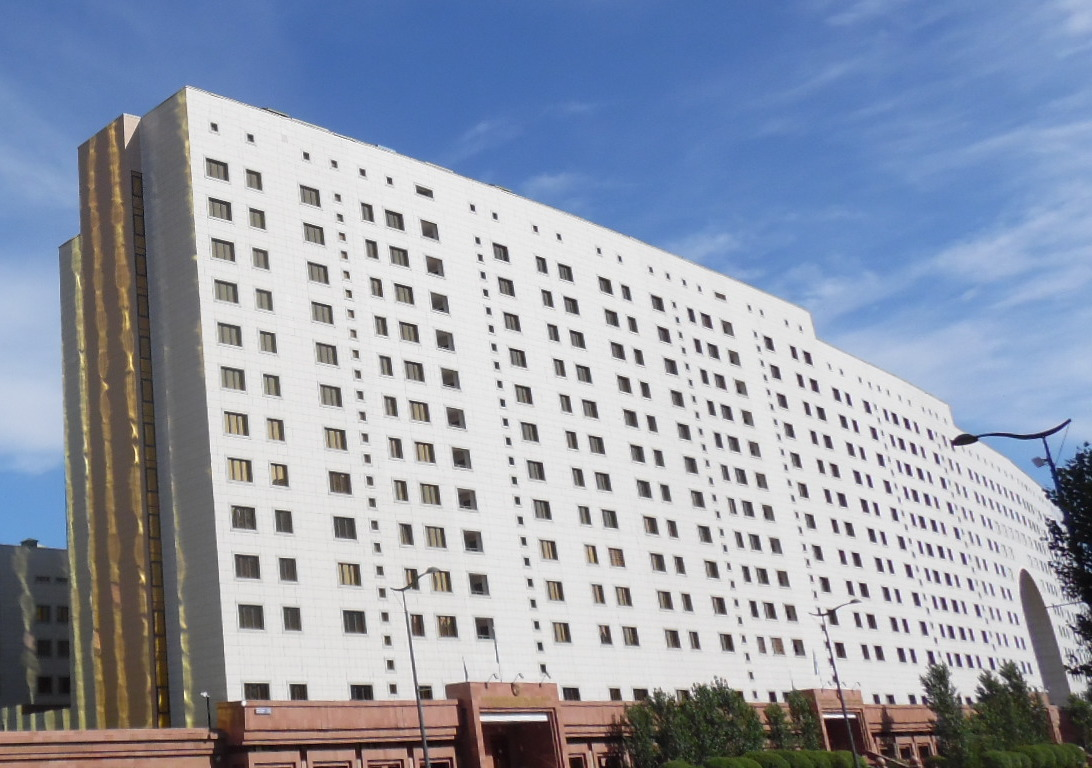
- House of Ministries

Agency overview
- Formed: 16 January 2013
- Dissolved: 14 August 2014
- Superseding agency: Ministry of National Economy
- Jurisdiction: Government of Kazakhstan
- Headquarters: Nur-Sultan, Kazakhstan

The Ministry of Regional Development of the Republic of Kazakhstan (MRD RK, Kazakh: Қазақстан Республикасы Өңірлік даму министрлігі, romanized: Qazaqstan Respublikasy Öñırlık damu ministrlıgı, ҚР ӨДМ; Russian: Министерство регионального развития Республики Казахстан, МРР РК) was a central executive body in the Government of Kazakhstan, which carried out coordination in the field of formation and implementation of state policy in the regional development, entrepreneurship support, including the activities of social and enterprise corporations.

The Ministry was formed on 16 January 2013 by the decree of the President of Kazakhstan #466 "On the further improvement of the public administration system of the Republic of Kazakhstan".

On 14 August 2014, the Ministry was reorganized into the Committee for Construction, Housing and Communal Services and Land Management which is led by Ministry of National Economy.
