= Ermağanbet Bölekpaev =

Kazakh politician (born 1975)

- Ермағанбет Бөлекпаев
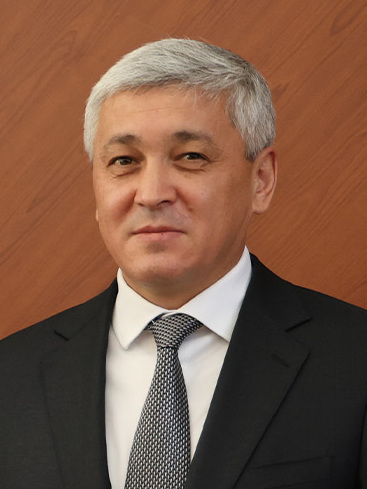
- Bölekpaev in 2025

Äkim of Karaganda Region
- Incumbent
- Assumed office 8 December 2022
- President: Kassym-Jomart Tokayev
- Preceded by: Jenis Qasymbek

Äkim of Karaganda
- In office 23 September 2020 – 8 December 2022
- President: Kassym-Jomart Tokayev
- Preceded by: Nurlan Aubakirov
- Succeeded by: Meiram Kozhuhov

Personal details
- Born: 2 September 1975 (age 51) Ospen, Shet District, Karaganda Region, Kazakh SSR, Soviet Union
- Education: Karagandy State University; Eurasian National University
- Awards: Order of Kurmet; Medal for Distinguished Labor

Ermağanbet Qabdulaūly Bölekpaev (Note: Often transliterated as Ermaganbet Kabdulovich Bulekpayev through a Russified Romanization of Ермаганбет Кабдулович Булекпаев.) (Kazakh: Ермағанбет Қабдулаұлы Бөлекпаев; born 2 September 1975) is a Kazakh lawyer and politician serving as the akim of Karaganda Region since 2022. He previously served as the akim of Karaganda from 2020 to 2022.

== Early life and education ==
Ermağanbet Bölekpaev was born on September 2, 1975, in Ospen, a village in Shet District, Karaganda Region, Kazakh Soviet Socialist Republic, Soviet Union (now Kazakhstan).

In 1996, he graduated from the Karagandy State University with a degree in law. Later, he earned an economics degree from the Eurasian National University.

== Early career ==
After graduating, Bölekpaev began his career as an economist at Kazkommertsbank’s Temirtau branch. In 1997 he moved to Astana to serve as director of the Business-Inform center’s representative office.

In 1998, he joined the Ministry of Industry and Trade, where he worked until 2003. He held several positions there, progressing from chief specialist and head of a department to deputy head of the Export Control and Export–Import Licensing Department.

In 2003, he served as an assistant to a member of Senate. Later that year he transferred to the Pavlodar regional administration as an assistant to akim Kairat Nurpeisov. In 2005, he was promoted to deputy chief of staff.

From April to September 2006, he led the office of Pavlodar city akim Bakir Demeuov. On September 11, 2006, he was appointed akim of Pavlodar District.

On November 10, 2008, he was named head of the Department of Entrepreneurship and Industry for Pavlodar Region. After seven months, on June 10, 2009, he relocated to Karaganda Region to head the Territorial Office of the Agency for Civil Service Affairs and concurrently chaired the regional Disciplinary Council. On July 30, 2011, he took up the position of head of the regional office of the same Agency in South Kazakhstan Region and again chaired that region’s Disciplinary Council.

== Political career ==
On July 9, 2013, he returned to Astana and, with the consent of the district Maslihat and by decree of akim Imangali Tasmagambetov, was appointed akim of Saryarqa District. On November 24, 2015, with the district Maslihat's approval and by decree of new akim Adilbek Zhaksybekov, he became akim of Almaty District. Almost a year later, on October 20, 2016, he was appointed akim of Esil District.

On February 12, 2018, he joined the Presidential Administration as a state inspector. After nine months, on November 30, he returned to Karaganda Region to serve as deputy akim under Erlan Qoşanov and subsequently under Jenis Qasymbek.

Following approval by the city Maslihat on September 23, 2020, Bölekpaev was appointed akim Karaganda city.

On December 8, 2022, president Tokayev proposed Bölekpaev and Serjan Aimaqov, head of the regional Department of State Architectural and Construction Control, for the post of akim of Karaganda Region. In an open vote attended by 178 Maslihat deputies, Bölekpaev received 138 votes while Aimakov received 40. After winning the vote and by Tokayev's decree No. 45 Bölekpaev was appointed 11th akim of Karaganda Region.

== Personal life ==
Bölekpaev has no publicly available information about his personal life, but in 2023, he said that his daughter was graduating from the Nazarbayev Intellectual School. Also Bölekpaev enjoys reading. He said the last book he read was Winston Churchill's The Second World War.

== Honours ==
- Order of Kurmet
- Medal for Distinguished Labor
