= Nurlan Aldabergenov =

Kazakh politician (born 1962)

- Нұрлан Алдабергенов
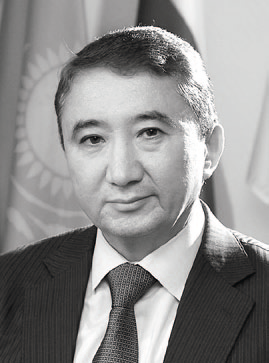

Head of the Prime Minister's Office
- In office 27 March 2017 – 1 March 2019
- Prime Minister: Bakhytzhan Sagintayev; Askar Mamin
- Preceded by: Erlan Qoşanov
- Succeeded by: Darhan Kaletaev

Chairman of the Agency of the Republic of Kazakhstan on Regulation of Natural Monopolies
- In office 21 December 2007 – 14 January 2012
- President: Nursultan Nazarbayev
- Preceded by: Bakhytzhan Sagintayev
- Succeeded by: Murat Ospanov

Member of the Board for Competition and Antimonopoly Regulation of the Eurasian Economic Commission
- In office 1 February 2012 – 14 April 2017
- Preceded by: Office established
- Succeeded by: Timur Jaqsylyqov

Personal details
- Born: 19 November 1962 (age 63) Alma-Ata, Kazakh SSR, Soviet Union
- Children: 3
- Education: Kazakh Leading Academy of Architecture and Civil Engineering; Moscow State University of Civil Engineering; D.A. Kunaev University of Humanities, Law, and Transport

Nurlan Shadibekuly Aldabergenov (born 19 November 1962) is a Kazakh politician who was the head of the Prime Minister's Office from 2017 to 2019, member of the Board for Competition and Antitrust Regulation of the Eurasian Economic Commission from 2012 to 2017, and the chairman of the Agency of the Republic of Kazakhstan for the Regulation of Natural Monopolies from 2007 to 2012.

== Biography ==
=== Early life and education ===
Born in Alma-Ata, Aldabergenov graduated from the Kazakh Leading Academy of Architecture and Civil Engineering with a degree in civil engineering in 1984. In 1987 he graduated from the graduate school of the Moscow State University of Civil Engineering where he received a Ph.D. in Economics. In 2005 Aldabergenov graduated from the D.A. Kunaev University of Humanities, Law, and Transport.

=== Career ===
From 1988 to 1989, Aldabergenov was a junior and senior researcher at the Alma-Ata Institute of Architecture and Civil Engineering. From 1989 to 1993, he served as a Deputy General Director of the Burundai Production Association of Wall Materials. In 1993 Aldabergenov became the general director of Alma. From 1994 to 1995, he was the head of the Department of Foreign Economic Relations of the Kazagromeliovodkhoz in the Ministry of Agriculture of Kazakhstan. From 1995 to 1996, he again was the General Director of Alma.

In 1996 Aldabergenov became the Deputy Chairman of the Committee on Price and Antimonopoly Policy. From 1999, he served as the Director of the Department of the Agency of the Republic of Kazakhstan for the Regulation of Natural Monopolies and Protection of Competition. In 2004 Aldabergenov became the First Deputy Chairman of the agency.

From 2005 to 2006, he was a member of the Board of Directors of NK Kazakhstan Temir Zholy JSC and member of the Board of Directors of the Small Business Development Fund JSC.

On 21 December 2007, Aldabergenov became the chairman of the Agency of the Republic of Kazakhstan for the Regulation of Natural Monopolies.

From 1 February 2012, he was the Member of the Board for Competition and Antitrust Regulation of the Eurasian Economic Commission. On 27 March 2017, he was appointed as the head of the Prime Minister's Office until his dismissal on 1 March 2019. On 28 March 2019, Aldabergenov became the executive secretary of the Ministry of National Economy. He served that position until 19 July 2019.
