= Darhan Kaletaev =

Kazakh politician (born 1972)

- Дархан Калетаев
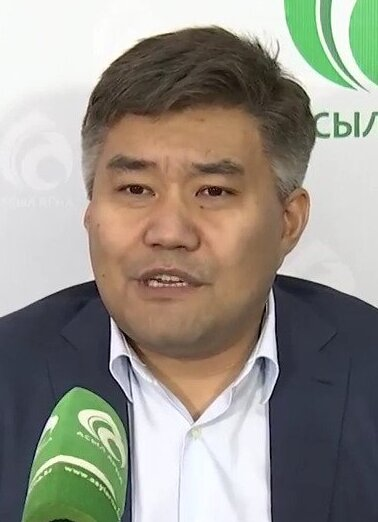
- Kaletaev in 2018

Ambassador of Kazakhstan to Ukraine
- Incumbent
- Assumed office 22 February 2020
- President: Kassym-Jomart Tokayev
- Preceded by: Samat Ordabaev

First Deputy Head of the Presidential Administration of Kazakhstan
- In office 25 March 2019 – 18 December 2019
- President: Kassym-Jomart Tokayev
- Preceded by: Marat Tazhin
- Succeeded by: Mäulen Äşimbaev

Head of the Prime Minister's Office
- In office 25 February 2019 – 25 March 2019
- Prime Minister: Asqar Mamin
- Preceded by: Nurlan Aldabergenov
- Succeeded by: Galymjan Qoishybaev

Minister of Social Development
- In office 4 April 2018 – 25 February 2019
- President: Nursultan Nazarbayev
- Prime Minister: Bakhytzhan Sagintayev; Asqar Mamin (acting)
- Preceded by: Nurlan Yermekbayev (Religious Affairs and Civil Society)
- Succeeded by: Dauren Abaev (Information and Social Development)

First Deputy Chairman of Nur Otan
- In office 13 October 2008 – 19 November 2009
- Chairman: Nursultan Nazarbayev
- Preceded by: Adilbek Zhaksybekov
- Succeeded by: Nurlan Nigmatulin

Personal details
- Born: 14 October 1972 (age 53) Priozyornoe, Kazakh SSR, Soviet Union
- Party: Nur Otan
- Spouse: Saltanat Nurseitova
- Children: 2
- Education: Sarsen Amanzholov East Kazakhstan State University; Academy of Public Administration

Darhan Amanuly Kaletaev (born 14 October 1972) is a Kazakh politician who serves as the Kazakh Ambassador to Ukraine. Since October 12, 2020 to 30 March 2022, he was appointed Ambassador Extraordinary and Plenipotentiary of the Republic of Kazakhstan to the Republic of Moldova concurrently.

== Biography ==
=== Early life and education ===
Kaletaev was born in the village of Priozyornoe (now Tugyl). In 1994, graduated from the Sarsen Amanzholov East Kazakhstan State University with a degree in history and attended the Academy of Public Administration from 1996 to 1997.

=== Career ===
From 1995 to 1997, he was a 1st category specialist, leading specialist of the Language Committee under the Cabinet of Ministers of the Republic of Kazakhstan, leading, chief specialist of the State Committee of the Republic of Kazakhstan on national policy, deputy head of the department of coordination of language policy of the Ministry of Education and Culture of Kazakhstan. In 2001, Kaletaev became the head of the Youth Policy Department of the Internal Policy Department of the Ministry of Information and Public Accord From 2002 to 2004, he served as the head of the sector, head of the internal policy department of the Presidential Administration. In 2004, Kaletaev became the head of the socio-political department of the Office of Internal Policy of the Administration of the President. From 2005 to 2006, he was the head of the socio-political department of the Presidential Administration.

In 2006, he became the Head of the Department of State Control and Organizational Work of the Administration. On 12 January 2007, Kaletaev was appointed as the Deputy Head of the Presidential Administration until 13 October 2008 when he became the First Deputy Chairman of Nur Otan. From November 2009 to October 2016, Kaletaev served as the Managing Director of the National Welfare Fund Samruk-Kazyna.

On 4 April 2018, Kaletaev was appointed as the Minister for Religious Affairs and Civil Society, until it was reorganized on 29 June 2018 to Ministry of Social Development. Shortly after that, Kaletaev became its minister on 3 July 2018.

On 1 March 2019, he was appointed as the head of the Office of the Prime`Minister of Kazakhstan until 25 March 2019, when Kaletaev became the First Deputy Head of the Presidential Administration of Kazakhstan.

On 22 February 2020, Kaletaev became the Ambassador of Kazakhstan to Ukraine.
