= Jenis Qasymbek =

Kazakh politician (born 1975)

Jeñıs Qasymbek
- Жеңіс Қасымбек
- Qasymbek in 2022

11th Äkim of Astana
- Incumbent
- Assumed office 8 December 2022
- Preceded by: Altai Kölgınov

Äkim of Karaganda Region
- In office 19 September 2019 – 8 December 2022
- Preceded by: Erlan Qoşanov
- Succeeded by: Ermağanbet Bölekpaev

Deputy Prime Minister of Kazakhstan
- In office 25 February 2019 – 18 September 2019
- Prime Minister: Askar Mamin

Minister of Industry and Infrastructure Development
- In office 21 June 2016 – 25 February 2019
- President: Nursultan Nazarbayev
- Prime Minister: Karim Massimov; Bakhytzhan Sagintayev; Askar Mamin
- Preceded by: Asset Issekeshev (Investment and Development)
- Succeeded by: Roman Sklyar

Minister of Transport and Communications
- In office 7 March 2014 – 6 August 2014
- President: Nursultan Nazarbayev
- Prime Minister: Serik Akhmetov; Karim Massimov
- Preceded by: Askar Zhumagaliyev
- Succeeded by: Office abolished

Personal details
- Born: Zhenis Makhmudovich Kassymbekov; 7 May 1975 (age 51) Shu, Dzhambul Oblast Kazakh SSR, Soviet Union
- Party: Nur Otan; Ädilet
- Parent: Makhmud Kassymbekov (father)
- Education: L.N. Gumilyov Eurasian National University; Kazakh Leading Academy of Architecture and Civil Engineering

Jeñıs Mahmūdūly Qasymbek (Note: Often transliterated as Zhenis Makhmudovich Kassymbek through a Russified Romanization of Женис Махмудович Касымбек.) (Kazakh: Жеңіс Махмұдұлы Қасымбек, [ʒʲeŋˈɘs mɑχˌmʊdʊˈɫɤ qɑsə̆mˈbʲek]; born 7 May 1975) is a Kazakh politician who is currently serving as the Äkim of Astana since December 2022.

== Early life and education ==
The son of Mahmud Qasymbek, Jenis Qasymbek was born to a Muslim family in the village of Shu. In 1997 he graduated from the Kazakh Leading Academy of Architecture and Civil Engineering as an architectural designer.

In 2001, he graduated from the L. N. Gumilyov Eurasian National University.

== Career ==
After graduating in 1997, Qasymbek was a trainee researcher at the Kazakh Haed Architecture and Civil Engineering Academy. In 1998, he became a chief specialist of Temirbank OJSC.

From 1998 to 2000, Qasymbek served as the head of Department of the Committee on Antimonopoly Policy of the Republic of Kazakhstan. In 2000, he became the director of the Department of Water Transport of the Ministry of Transport and Communications of the Republic of Kazakhstan until becoming the director of the RSE Aktau International Sea Trade Port.

On 4 November 2005, he was appointed as a Vice Minister of Transport and Communications and from 11 March 2009, Qasymbek was the executive secretary of the Ministry of Transport and Communications.

On 7 March 2014, he became a Minister of Transport and Communications until the ministry was abolished on 6 August 2014. Shortly after, Qasymbek was appointed as the First Vice Minister for Investment and Development on 13 August 2014. He became its minister on 21 June 2016 and served that position until the Sagintayev Government was dismissed in February 2019.

Following formation of Mamin Government, Qasymbek was appointed as the Deputy Prime Minister of Kazakhstan on 25 February 2019.

He served that post before becoming the akim of Karaganda Region on 19 September 2019.

On 4 September 2023, he became the President of the Athletics Federation of Astana.

== Äkim of Astana (2022–present) ==
On 8 December 2022, Qasymbek was appointed as the äkim of Astana under presidential decree by Kassym-Jomart Tokayev, succeeding Altai Kölgınov who previously held the post. Upon his appointment, Qasymbek in his Instagram page expressed his commitment to enhancing Astana's infrastructure, social services, and living conditions, inviting residents to share their ideas for development. He also pledged that Astana would continue the construction of affordable social housing, schools, kindergartens, and medical facilities.

On 13 December 2022, Qasymbek met with President Tokayev to present a report on Astana’s socioeconomic status and infrastructural progress, including updates on key construction projects, advancements in gasification, and support for local businesses. Tokayev instructed him to oversee the heating season efficiently and to maintain momentum on the city’s development.

Astana has faced rapid urban growth and increasing pressure on infrastructure and services. To address these challenges, Qasymbek prioritized the advancement of the Astana Light Metro (LRT) system, committing to complete construction within two to three years despite project financing difficulties. Alongside the LRT, major infrastructure projects such as the Uly Dala and Tauelsizdik bridges were built, significantly improving connectivity across the city and easing traffic congestion.

Urban renewal and green space development have been important focuses under Qasymbek's leadership. By 2024, approximately 140 residential courtyards and 30 public recreational spaces—including parks, boulevards, and pedestrian zones—were renovated or established to enhance community life and urban aesthetics. The administration also launched a large-scale tree planting campaign in 2023, planting over one million trees and shrubs to improve air quality and ecological sustainability.

Education has been another priority, with 24 new Astana schools being constructed under the national "Comfortable School" program to accommodate nearly 90,000 students with modern facilities. Addressing the housing shortage remained urgent, with over 47,000 residents on social housing waiting lists, half of whom are large families. Programs to reduce this backlog and expand gasification of utilities in residential areas continue to progress, supported largely by private business efforts.

Economically, Astana attracted investments totaling nearly 978.5 billion tenge in the first seven months of 2023, marking a 9.2% increase over the previous year. This growth has reinforced Astana’s role as a regional economic hub and center for trade, technology, and innovation.

To improve safety and urban management, Qasymbek's administration has expanded video surveillance and traffic monitoring systems citywide, aiming to enhance public safety and optimize traffic flows. Investments have also been made in pedestrian and cyclist infrastructure to promote sustainable, active transportation aligned with global urban development trends.

== Awards and honors ==
Qasymbek's awards and honors include:

Сountry	Date	Award
Kazakhstan	—	Order of Kurmet
Kazakhstan	2017	Order of Parasat
Kazakhstan	2001	Medal "10 years of independence of the Republic of Kazakhstan"
Kazakhstan	2008	Medal "10 years of Astana"
Kazakhstan	2018	Medal "20 years of Astana"
