= Karazhartas Necropolis =

- Қаражартас қорымы
- Interactive map of Karazhartas Necropolis
- Location: Shet District, Karaganda Region, Kazakhstan
- Coordinates: 49°08′08.5″N 73°54′57.5″E

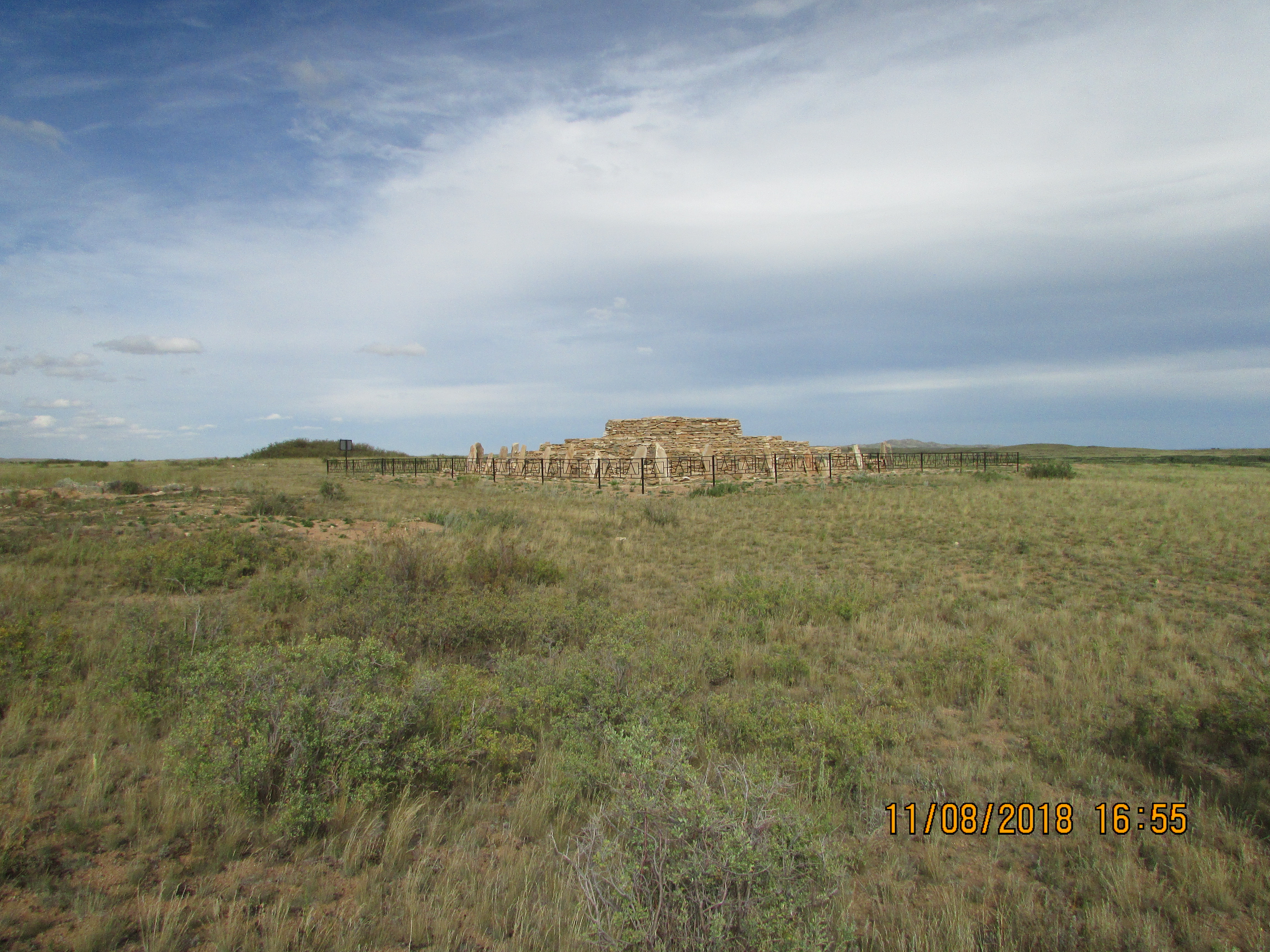
General view of the Karazhartas burial ground

The Karazhartas Necropolis is one of the megalithic monuments of the Begazy-Dandybai culture of the Late Bronze Age. It is located on the right bank of the Taldy River, 2 km west of the village of Zhanazhurt, 12 km east of the village of Taldy, in the territory of the Taldy Rural District of the Shet District of the Karaganda Region in Kazakhstan.

Research work on the monument was carried out in 2016-2017. Candidate of Historical Sciences, archaeologist Igor Alekseevich Kukushkin from the Research Institute "Saryarka Archaeological Institute" at KarSU named after. E. A. Buketova. The Karazhartas Necropolis contains 41 buildings from the Late Bronze Age and Early Iron Age. In 2016-2017 at the monument, a pyramidal-step mausoleum measuring 14x14.5 m was examined, with the burial of a member of the tribal nobility of the Begazy-Dandybai society. The grave structure has about 5-6 walls constructed with masonry. In addition to the elite burial complex, excavations covered 12 more structures of lower social status.

According to radiocarbon analysis conducted in the CHRONO laboratory of Queen's University, Belfast (Northern Ireland), it was established that the burial ground functioned during the 15th-14th centuries BC. The studied mausoleum is the largest and most structurally complex structure of the Late Bronze Age in Central Kazakhstan.

Four kilometers west of the Karazhartas burial site, at the Tabyldy necropolis, a burial mound containing two horses, simulating a chariot team, was excavated in 2018. The horses were lying on their sides, with their backs to each other.

The Akim of the Karaganda Region Koshanov ordered to create infrastructure and conditions for visiting tourists. Businessmen want to create an ethno-aul.
