= Makhmud Kassymbekov =

Kazakh politician

Mahmud Qasymbekov
- Махмұд Қасымбеков

Head of the Chancellery of the President
- In office 1996–2019
- President: Nursultan Nazarbayev
- Succeeded by: Baqytjan Sariev

Personal details
- Born: Makhmud Bazarkulovich Kassymbekov (Note: from Russian: Махмуд Базаркулович Касымбеков); 2 August 1952 (age 73) Chu, Jambyl Region, Kazakh SSR, Soviet Union
- Spouse: Zauresh Kenchebayeva
- Children: 3, including Jenis
- Education: Abai Kazakh National Pedagogical University; Alma-Ata Institute of National Economy
- Degree: Doctor of Political Sciences

Makhmud Bazarkululy Kassymbekov (Kazakh: Махмұд Базарқұлұлы Қасымбеков, Mahmūd Bazarqūlūly Qasymbekov; born 2 August 1952) is a Kazakh politician and political scientist, Head of the Chancellery of the President from 1996 to 2019 under President Nursultan Nazarbayev.

== Early life and education ==
Hailing from the Argyn tribe, Makhmud Kassymbekov was born on August 2, 1952, in Chu, Jambyl Region. Kassymbekov's father, Bazarkul Kassymbekov (1914–1992), was a World War II veteran and his mother, Kulyanda Kassymbekova (born 1920), is a pensioner.

In 1974, Kassymbekov finished his studies in Abai Kazakh National Pedagogical University and thus became a math teacher. In 1985, he got an economics degree from the Alma-Ata Institute of National Economy and in 1990, he got a political science degree from the Alma-Ata Higher Party School.

In 2000, Kassymbekov gave his "On the becoming and development of the Office of President of Kazakhstan" thesis and through it became a Candidate of Political Sciences. In 2002, he earned a doctorate in the field by making the thesis "The Institute of the Presidency as a tool of Political Modernization (with Kazakhstan as example)".

== Career ==
=== Soviet career ===
Before his political career, Kassymbekov started off by affiliating himself with the Communist Party of Kazakhstan and the related leadership positions. From 1969 to 1970, he was the senior pioneer leader in the Saken Seifullin Middle School in Chu. From 1970 to 1976, he rose among the ranks of the Kazakh Pedagogical Institute Komsomol, starting from a student, then Deputy Secretary, and later Secretary of a Committee.

In later years, he continued his work for the Komsomol, being Secretary, Second Secretary of the Frunze District Komsomol of Alma-Ata from 1976 to 1977, Alma-Ata City Komsomol Committee Secretary and Alma-Ata Regional Komsomol Secretary from 1977 to 1981, Superintendent of the Propaganda and Cultural-Mass work Department of the Central Committee of the Komsomol from 1981 to 1983.

He switched away from the Komsomol to the Party itself in 1983, becoming the Alma-Ata Regional Instructor of the Communist Party. Ending this work in 1985, he served as Instructor, later Sector Superintendent of the Communist Party of Kazakhstan Central Committee until 1990.

=== Chancellery of the President ===
In 1990, Kassymbekov briefly served as a Superintendent to a Sector of the President of Kazakh SSR. From there until 1994, he was a Superintendent of the General Department of the Apparatus of the President and the Cabinet of Ministers. From 1994 to 1996, he held a similar position, but solely of the Presidential Administration.

In 1996, Kassymbekov was appointed Superintendent of the Chancellery of the President until 2002, when the position was moved and now named as Superintendent of the Chancellery of the Presidential Administration. In 2004, Kassymbekov became Head of the Chancellery of the President, the position he held until 2019.

=== Other positions ===
From April 2013 to March 2014, Kassymbekov was Acting Head of the Multifunctional scientific-analytical and humanitarian-educational state institution "Nazarbayev Center". From March 2014 to March 2019, he served as Acting Head of the "Library of the First President of the Republic of Kazakhstan — Elbasy" state body.

=== Chancellery of Elbasy ===
Since March 2019, Kassymbekov has been serving as the Head of the Chancellery of Elbasy Nursultan Nazarbayev. In 2023, the Chancellery was dissolved, as was the Elbasy title.

== Personal life ==
Kassymbekov is married to Zauresh Kenchebayeva. They have three children: daughter Janyl (born 1974), sons Jenis (born 1975) and Ardaq (born 1977). Jenis Qasymbek, much like his father, became a politician and now serves as Äkim of Astana since 2022, while his brother Ardaq worked for KazMunayGas.

== Awards and honours ==
Awards, decorations, and honours given to Kassymbekov include:

- Order of the Leopard, 1st degree (2019)
- Taraggi Medal (2018, Azerbaijan)
- Order of Nazarbayev (2009)
- Order of the Leopard, 2nd degree (2004)
- State Prize of Kazakhstan in the field of science, technology and education (2001)
- Order of Kurmet (1999)
- Astana Medal (1998)
- Certificates of Honour by the Supreme Council of the Kazakh SSR, Central Committee of the Komsomol, Central Committee of the Kazakh SSR Komsomol
- Central Committee of the Komsomol Certificate "For active duty to the Komsomol"
- Almaty Region Honorary citizenship

Kassymbekov has also been awarded numerous commemorative awards, including:

- "10 years to the Independence of Kazakhstan" Medal
- "100 years to the Railway of Kazakhstan" Medal
- "50 years to Tselina" Medal
- "10 years to the Parliament of Kazakhstan" Medal
- "10 years to the Constitution of Kazakhstan" Medal
- "10 years to Astana" Medal
- "20 years to the Independence of Kazakhstan" Medal
- "20 years to the Constitution of Kazakhstan" Medal
- "25 years to the Independence of Kazakhstan" Medal
