= 2023 Chairman of the Mäjilis of the Parliament of Kazakhstan election =

- 29 March 2023

Needed to win: Majority of the votes cast 98 votes cast, 50 needed for a majority
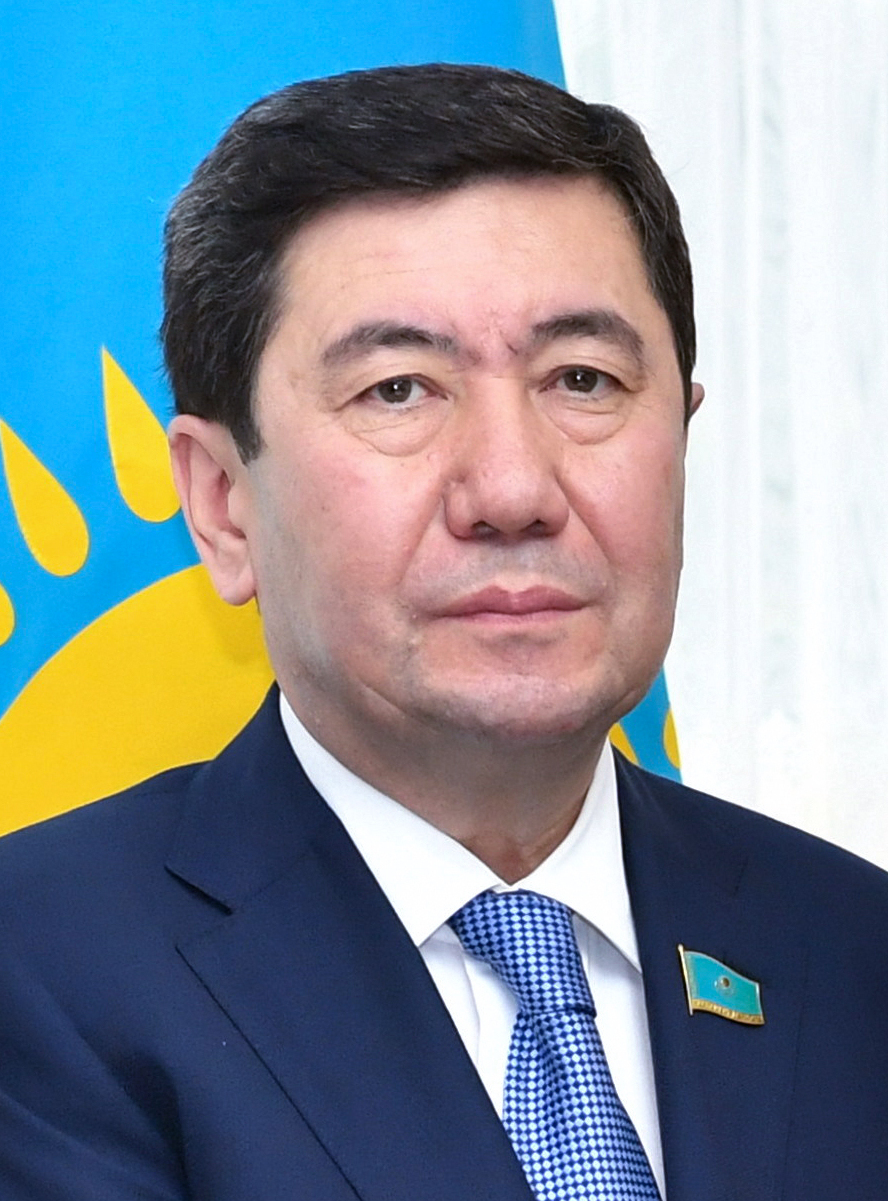
	First party
Candidate	Erlan Qoşanov
Party	Amanat
Popular vote	98
Percentage	100%
Chairman before election
Erlan Qoşanov
Amanat
Elected Chairman
Erlan Qoşanov
Amanat

A chairmanship election for the Mäjilis of the Parliament of Kazakhstan was held at the first plenary session on 29 March 2023 in order to elect the chairman of the Mäjilis.

Erlan Qoşanov, leader of the Amanat who previously served his term as Mäjilis chairman of its previous convocation since February 2022, was reelected to the post as a single candidate in a unanimous vote from all the sitting deputies.

== Background ==
In the aftermath of the 2023 Kazakh legislative election, President Kassym-Jomart Tokayev on 27 March 2023 signed a decree in convening the 8th Parliament of Kazakhstan for 29 March, to which the first plenary session Mäjilis was scheduled to be held that same day.

== Procedure ==
=== Conduct ===
Under Section 2(1) of the Procedure of the Mäjilis, the chairman of the Central Election Commission (Nurlan Äbdirov) opens and convenes the first plenary session of the newly elected Mäjilis. From there, the Mäjilis deputies in an open vote elect members of the Commission for Control over the Use of the Electronic System by a majority vote before the election of a Mäjilis chairman takes place.

=== Electoral system ===
According to Article 58(1) of the Constitution of Kazakhstan, the chairpersons of both chambers under the Parliament of Kazakhstan are elected by a majority vote in a secret ballot from the total number of deputies of the chambers. The candidacy of a Mäjilis chairman is nominated by deputies of the chamber.

== Candidates ==
Amanat MP Baktykozha Izmukhambetov at the opening convocation of the 8th Mäjilis, proposed Erlan Qoşanov's candidacy to the post of the chairmanship, citing his previous experiences in serving public offices in Kazakhstan.

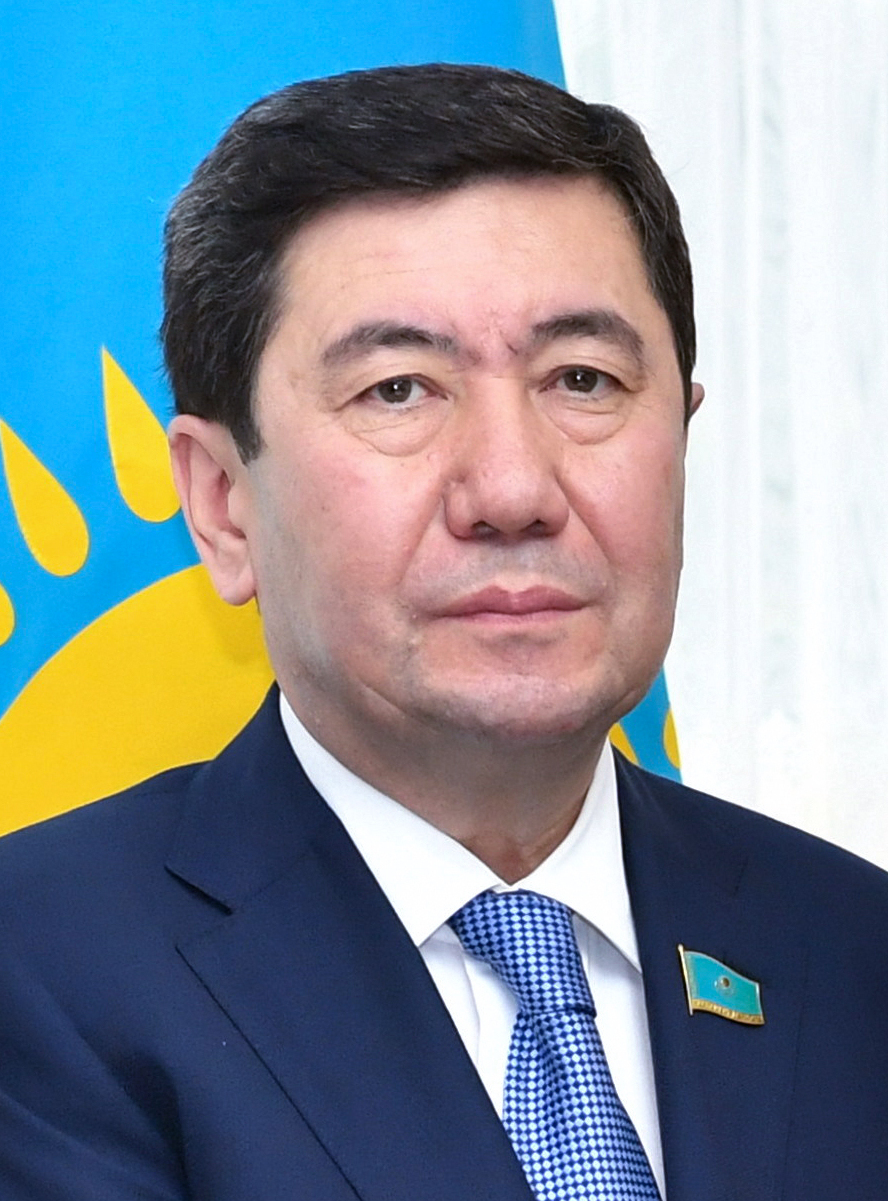
Erlan Qoşanov Amanat
- Erlan Qoşanov, Chairman of the 8th Mäjilis (2022–2023), Chairman of Amanat (2022–present), Member of the Majilis (2022–present), Head of the Presidential Administration (2019–2022), Äkim of Karaganda Region (2017–2019), Head of Prime Minister's Office (2012–2017), Member of the Senate (1995–1999)

== Voting ==
Following proposal, the Mäjilis deputies unanimously voted in favour of including Qoşanov to the voting ballot, as well as electing the composition of the overseeing secret voting commission for Control over the Use of the Electronic System with Janarbek Äşimjanov serving as chairman and Natalia Damentyeva as his secretary.

All deputies were given twenty minutes to cast votes, that proceeded by a ten-minute break from which Äşimjanov then announced the results of the parliamentary vote in Qoşanov being unanimously reelected as the chairman of Mäjilis with all 98 votes.

Candidate	Party	Votes	%
Erlan Qoşanov	Amanat	98	100.00
Total		98	100.00
Valid votes		98	100.00
Invalid/blank votes		0	0.00
Total votes		98	100.00
Registered voters/turnout		98	100.00
Source: Press service of the Mäjilis

== Aftermath ==
In response to his reelection, Qoşanov expressed his gratitude to the parliamentarians, calling it "great honor and a great responsibility" and pledged to implement the reforms by President Tokayev and the "trust of the voters". From there, Qoşanov proposed Amanat MP Albert Rau and Aq Jol MP Dania Espaeva as deputy chairs which were subsequently elected to the position.
