= Aksu-Ayuly =

Aksu-Ayuly Ақсу-Аюлы
- Village
- Location in Kazakhstan
- Coordinates: 48°46′04″N 73°40′24″E
- Country: Kazakhstan
- Region: Karaganda Region
- District: Shet District
- Established: 1931

Population (2019)
  - Total: 4,098
- Time zone: UTC+6
- Postcode: 101700

Aksu-Ayuly (Kazakh: Ақсу-Аюлы; Russian: Аксу-Аюлы) is the district capital of Shet District, Karaganda Region, Kazakhstan. It is also the administrative center of the Aksu-Ayuly Rural District (KATO code - 356430100). Population: 4,586 (2009 census results); 4,522 (1999 census results).

The village is the birthplace of Kazakh poet Ikhlas Adambekov (1912–1941), as well as politicians Nurlan Äbdirov and Nurlan Dulatbekov, among other notable personalities.

== History ==
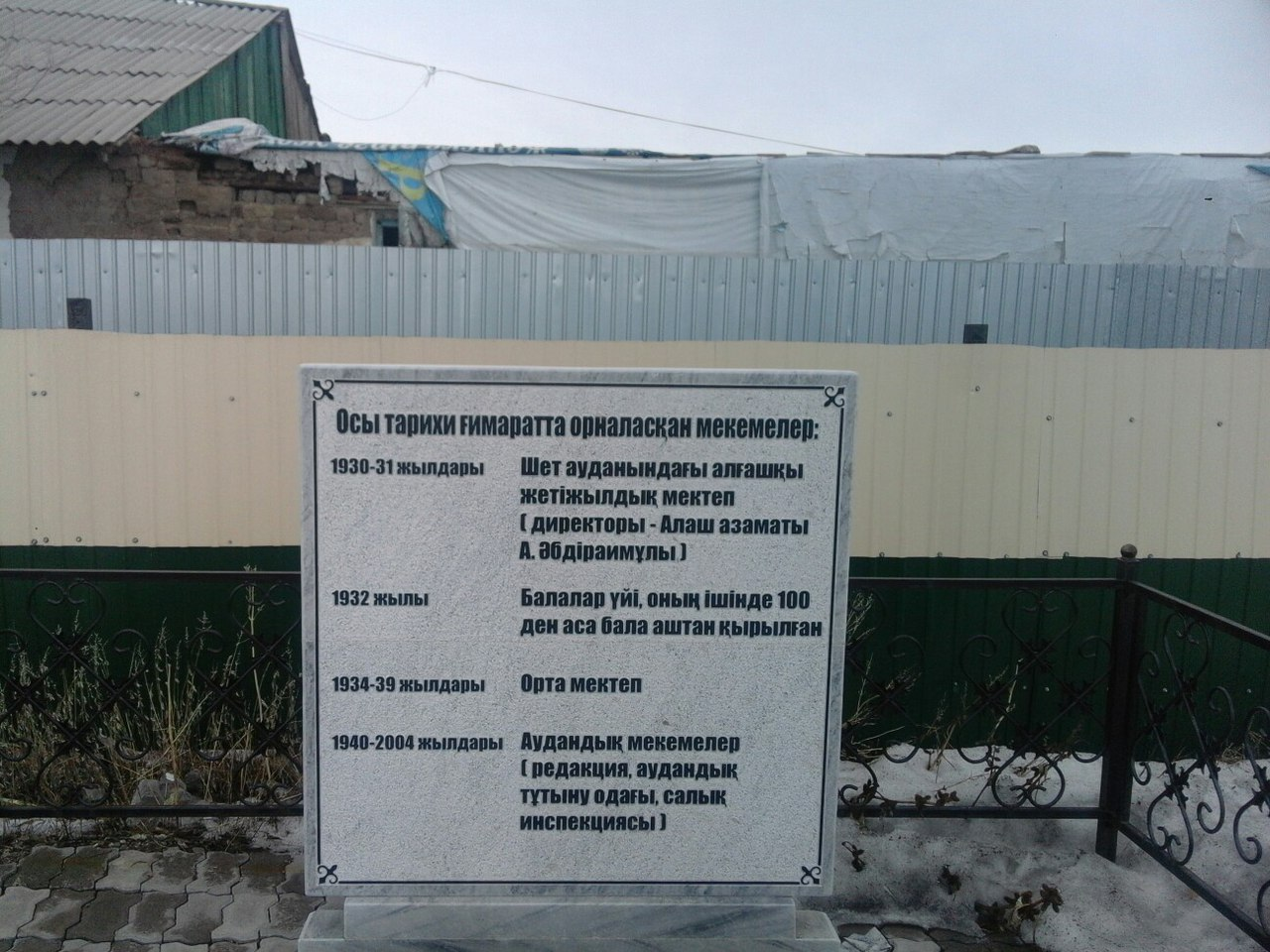
A Kazakh famine of 1930–1933 memorial board

The village was founded in 1931. In 1956, the Koktenkol molybdenum deposit was discovered 80 km southwest of the village.

== Geography ==
Aksu-Ayuly lies in the Sherubainura river valley, at its confluence with the Aksu river, by the eastern slopes of Mount Ayuly. It is located by the Astana - Almaty highway, about 130 kilometers (81 mi) to the southeast of Karaganda, the regional capital.

=== Climate ===
Climate data for Aksu-Ayuly (1991-2020 normals)
Month	Jan	Feb	Mar	Apr	May	Jun	Jul	Aug	Sep	Oct	Nov	Dec	Year
Mean daily maximum °C (°F)	−9.9 (14.2)	−7.5 (18.5)	0.1 (32.2)	13.4 (56.1)	21.0 (69.8)	26.3 (79.3)	27.3 (81.1)	26.2 (79.2)	20.0 (68.0)	11.4 (52.5)	0.0 (32.0)	−7.5 (18.5)	10.1 (50.1)
Daily mean °C (°F)	−15.6 (3.9)	−14.2 (6.4)	−6.4 (20.5)	6.0 (42.8)	13.0 (55.4)	18.5 (65.3)	19.7 (67.5)	18.0 (64.4)	11.4 (52.5)	3.7 (38.7)	−5.9 (21.4)	−12.9 (8.8)	2.9 (37.3)
Mean daily minimum °C (°F)	−21.0 (−5.8)	−20.3 (−4.5)	−12.1 (10.2)	−0.6 (30.9)	5.1 (41.2)	10.4 (50.7)	12.1 (53.8)	10.0 (50.0)	3.6 (38.5)	−2.3 (27.9)	−10.8 (12.6)	−18.0 (−0.4)	−3.7 (25.4)
Average precipitation mm (inches)	19.6 (0.77)	18.8 (0.74)	22.9 (0.90)	25.1 (0.99)	27.8 (1.09)	34.9 (1.37)	47.4 (1.87)	25.5 (1.00)	19.0 (0.75)	26.1 (1.03)	27.4 (1.08)	23.4 (0.92)	317.9 (12.51)
Average precipitation days (≥ 1.0 mm)	6.4	5.6	5.8	5.8	5.7	6	7.6	4.1	3.6	5.6	7.6	7.3	71.1
Source: NCEI
