= Adilbek Zhaksybekov =

Kazakh politician (born 1954)

- Әділбек Жақсыбеков
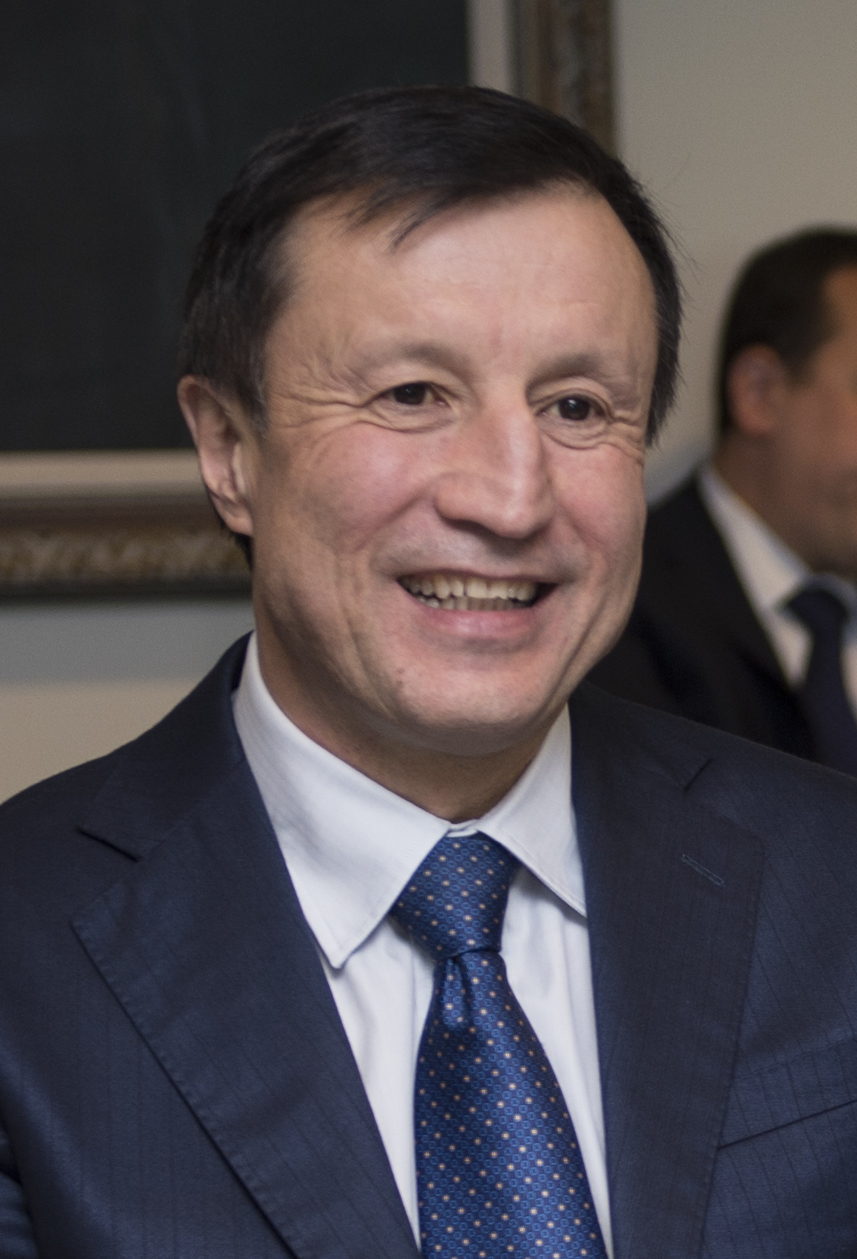
- Jaqsybekov in 2013

State Secretary of Kazakhstan
- In office 2 April 2014 – 22 October 2014
- President: Nursultan Nazarbayev
- Preceded by: Karim Massimov (Acting)
- Succeeded by: Gulshara Abdykhalikova

Head of the Presidential Administration of Kazakhstan
- In office 21 June 2016 – 10 September 2018
- President: Nursultan Nazarbayev
- First Deputy: Marat Tazhin
- Preceded by: Nurlan Nigmatulin
- Succeeded by: Asset Issekeshev
- In office 19 December 2004 – 23 January 2008
- First Deputy: Marat Tazhin
- Preceded by: Imangali Tasmagambetov
- Succeeded by: Kairat Kelimbetov

Minister of Defense
- In office 24 June 2009 – 2 April 2014
- President: Nursultan Nazarbayev
- Prime Minister: Karim Massimov
- Preceded by: Daniyal Akhmetov
- Succeeded by: Serik Akhmetov

Minister of Industry and Trade
- In office 16 June 2003 – December 2004
- President: Nursultan Nazarbayev
- Prime Minister: Daniyal Akhmetov
- Preceded by: Mazhit Esenbaev
- Succeeded by: Sauat Mynbayev

7th mayor of Nur-Sultan
- In office 22 October 2014 – 21 June 2016
- Preceded by: Imangali Tasmagambetov
- Succeeded by: Asset Issekeshev
- In office 10 December 1997 – June 2003
- Preceded by: Office established
- Succeeded by: Temirkhan Dosmukhanbetov

First Deputy Chairman of Nur Otan
- In office 23 January 2008 – 13 October 2008
- Chairman: Nursultan Nazarbayev
- Preceded by: Bakhytzhan Zhumagulov
- Succeeded by: Darhan Kaletaev

Personal details
- Born: 26 July 1954 (age 71) Burli, Kazakh SSR, Soviet Union
- Party: Nur Otan
- Spouse: Lazzat Ibragimovа

Adilbek Ryskeldiuly Dzhaksybekov (Kazakh: Әділбек Рыскелдіұлы Жақсыбеков, romanized: Ädılbek Ryskeldıūly Jaqsybekov; born 26 July 1954) is current Head of the Executive Office of the President of the Republic of Kazakhstan. He served as the minister of defence from June 2009 to April 2014. He was the head of Kazakh President Nursultan Nazarbayev's administration in 2004–08 and 2016–18. He served as the mayor of Astana from 1997 to 2003 and from 2014 to 2016. Chairman of Governors of the Islamic Development Bank in 2003, and the Minister of Industry and Trade from 2003 to 2004.

While Information Minister, Zhaksybekov participated in a meeting held in Kyiv, Ukraine in 2004 in which a Common Economic Area was proposed for Kazakhstan, Ukraine, Belarus, and Russia.

On 4 April 2004, he gave a speech entitled "The Industrial Innovation Development Strategy of Kazakhstan, 2003–2015" in Washington, DC.

== Kazakhstan and the World Trade Organization ==
Supachai Panitchpakdi, the Director-General of the World Trade Organization, met with Zhaksybekov and a government delegation in Geneva on 9–15 July to discuss Kazakh admission into the World Trade Organization. The Kazakh Foreign Ministry issued a press release about the talks on 17 July. Radio Free Europe reported that a WTO Secretariat offered to "provide technical and organizational help to prepare Kazakhstan for membership" as both Panitchpakdi and Zhaksybekov agreed that Kazakhstan "needs to make its economy more competitive before joining." The WTO credited the government for liberalizing its policy on foreign-trade and conforming to WTO accounting policies. The Kazakh Foreign Ministry was positive about Kazakhstan's prospects of becoming the second Central Asian state with membership in the WTO.

== Cultural exchange with Russia ==
Zhaksybekov, who served as the mayor of Astana, met with Yuri Luzhkov, the mayor of Moscow, during the "Days of culture," held from 14–16 May, in 2002. The local government in Moscow sponsored ten events, including the presentation of a stone sculpture entitled "A Symbol of Friendship of Moscow and Astana."

== Trade agreements ==
=== Agreement with Pakistan ===
Zhaksybekov and Abdul Hafeez Sheikh, the Pakistani Minister for Investment and Privatization, signed a trade agreement on 8 December 2003. According to Dawn, the agreement would "promote and protect bilateral trade and investment and enhance economic, scientific and technical cooperation" by creating "favourable conditions for investment by each others' investors for reciprocal promotion and protection of investments." The agreement prevented double taxation, and forbid "expropriat[ion], nationaliz[ation]," and "requisitioning" of each other's investments in their respective countries.

=== Agreement with Afghanistan ===
Sayeed Moustafa Khazi, Afghan's Trade Minister, and Zhaksybekov signed an Agreement on Trade and Economic Cooperation on 15 April 2004. President Nazarbayev and Afghan President Hamid Karzai signed an agreement on Treaty on Foundations of Relations and Cooperation earlier that day in Astana. The meeting was Karzai's first official visit to Kazakhstan. Nazarbayev told a news conference in Astana, "Kazakhstan is absolutely interested in developing trade, economic and political relations with Afghanistan, as well as in our joint fight against terrorism and drug trafficking." He continued by saying the entire world was eager to see peace and economic restoration in Afghanistan, and "we are in this coalition. We are grateful to President Karzai for inviting Kazakh bankers and businesspeople to come and work in Afghanistan. Today's visit of the Afghan President is historic, because we meet here for the first time since the statehood of Afghanistan has been restored and the documents we signed are a good foundation for further cooperation." The President continued by offering to provide Kazakh experts "ready to work in Afghanistan in geology, building roads and installations, helping with medical professional, and continue to assist in any way we can, because we are interested in stability in Afghanistan. We want to trade and to use Afghan territory to build links to the south." Karzai said, "I believe Kazakhstan is an example of a country that was given an opportunity and used it. We intend to continue working with Kazakhstan to develop transit potential and bilateral trade."

== Information technology ==
On 26 March 2004, Zhaksybekov met with Information Minister Birzhan Kaneshev and Jean-Philippe Courtois, the Microsoft CEO for Europe, the Middle East and Africa, in Astana. They signed a memorandum of understanding outlining the development of information technology in Kazakhstan. Microsoft agreed to help the government create an internal network, an information technology sector, and Microsoft Office software in Kazakh. Courtois noted Microsoft and the government agreed to exchange information security knowledge. Zhaksybekov said the MOU would lead to future deals with other companies "involving big money."

== Islamic Development Bank ==
The Islamic Development Bank, which Zhaksybekov chaired in 2003, agreed to lend the Kazakh government an additional USD $32 million in a meeting in September 2003. IRIN reported the money was lent for "upgrading water and postal systems and establishing a 'legal and humanitarian' university."

== 2007 political shakeup ==
Prime Minister Daniyal Akhmetov resigned on 8 January 2007. President Nazarbayev nominated Deputy Prime Minister Karim Masimov, Akhmetov's political rival, to succeed Akhmetov, on 9 January 2007. Nazarbayev's political party Nur Otan endorsed Massimov, but some analysts in Kazakhstan considered Zhaksybekov as a candidate. The Parliament convened on 10 January to which Massimov was confirmed as the Prime Minister.

== Football official ==
He was the head of the Football Federation of Astana city from 2000, until being elected the president of the Football Federation of Kazakhstan on 28 August 2007.
