= Akbastau =

River in Kazakhstan

Akbastau Ақбастау
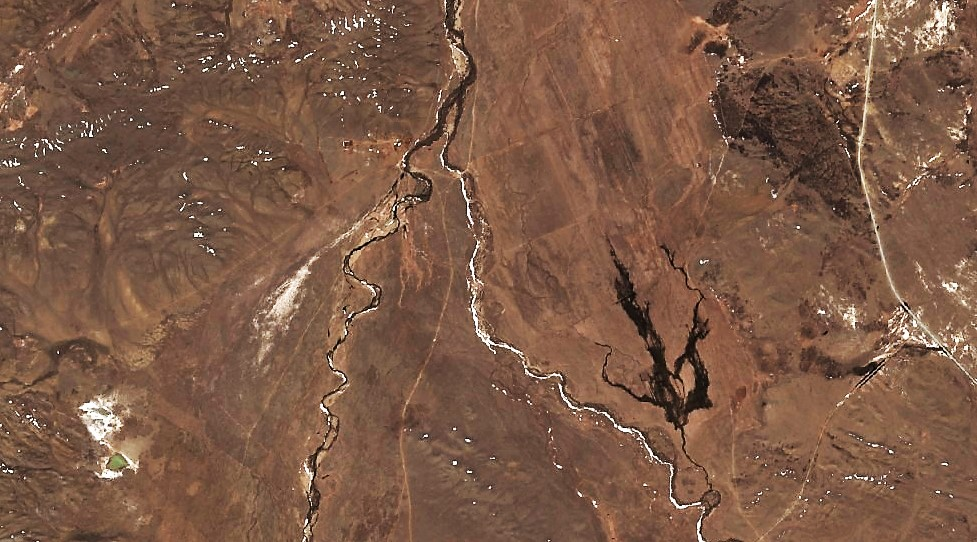
- Sentinel-2 image of the confluence of rivers Akbastau (left) and Nura (right).

- Mouth location in Kazakhstan

Location
- Countries: Kazakhstan

Physical characteristics
- Source: Zhaksy Karazhal; Kazakh Uplands
  - coordinates: 49°08′44″N 74°12′37″E
  - elevation: ca 850 metres (2,790 ft)
- Mouth: Nura
  - coordinates: 49°36′39″N 74°19′44″E
  - elevation: 624 metres (2,047 ft)
- Length: 83 km (52 mi)
- Basin size: 1,570 km^{2} (610 sq mi)
- Discharge
  - average: 0.18 m^{3}/s (6.4 cu ft/s)

The Akbastau (Kazakh: Ақбастау; Russian: Акбастау) is a river in Karkaraly District, Karaganda Region, Kazakhstan. It is 83 kilometres (52 mi) long and has a catchment area of 1,570 square kilometres (610 sq mi).

== Course ==
The Akbastau has its sources in a spring of the northern slopes of Zhaksy Karazhal mountains, at the northern end of Shet District. It heads northwards as a mountain river, forming rapids within a narrow valley. Towards the end it enters a floodplain and its channel divides into branches and becomes sinuous, flowing roughly northwards all along. Finally it reaches the left bank of river Nura close to the western slopes of Mount Yegizkyzyl.

The Akbastau is fed by snow and groundwater. It is frozen between early December and mid-April. Its main tributaries are the Ainasu and Kamystybulak from the left, and the Kaskakudyk from the right. The water of the river stays fresh all year round.

== Ecology ==
The river basin is used as pasture for local cattle. Grasses, willow thickets, fescue and sedges grow near the banks.

== See also ==
- List of rivers of Kazakhstan
