= People's Council of Kazakhstan =

Highest consultative body of Kazakhstan

- Қазақстан Халық кеңесі
- Emblem of Kazakhstan

Consultative body overview
- Formed: September 23, 2026; 12 days ago
- Preceding agencies: Assembly of People of Kazakhstan; National Kurultai
- Headquarters: Astana, Kazakhstan
- Chairman responsible: Erlan Qoşanov
- Key documents: Article(s) 70, 21, Constitution of Kazakhstan; Law “On Certain Issues of the Qazaqstan Khalyq Kenesi”
- Website: socio-political website of Council

The People's Council of Kazakhstan (Note: Kazakh: Қазақстан Халық кеңесі) is the highest constitutional consultative body representing the public interest in Kazakhstan. Established under a new constitutional framework that entered into force on July 1, 2026, it serves as the state's primary institutional platform for national dialogue and incorporating civic feedback into policy.

The council is designed as a direct structural successor to the Assembly of People of Kazakhstan and the National Kurultai, consolidating their historical functions into a single constitutional entity.

== History ==
On January 20, 2026,president of Kazakhstan Kassym-Jomart Tokayev proposed the establishment of a new consultative body, the People's Council of Kazakhstan, to replace both the Assembly of People of Kazakhstan and the National Kurultai. The council was officially established on July 1, 2026, when a new Constitution of Kazakhstan entered into force. President Tokayev approved the initial composition of the People's Council on September 22, 2026, and the body held its inaugural session the following day.

== Authorities and powers ==
=== Authorities ===
The Council can draft and directly submit bills to the Kurultai upon the proposal of its Presidium or at least one-third of its members, and it is constitutionally empowered to initiate a nationwide referendum with the support of at least three-fourths (75%) of voting members, while also drafting formal strategic recommendations on domestic policies, social development, and national unity that state agencies are legally mandated to officially receive, review, and consider.

=== Powers ===
The council holds the authority to monitor and assess the execution of state policies and regional socio-economic programs, organizing broad public consultations, discussion platforms, and open hearings to channel grievances and ideas from regional maslikhats (local assemblies) to the central government, while also supervising inter-ethnic relations and promoting national values as the institutional successor to the Assembly of People of Kazakhstan and playing a key administrative role in organizing the Congress of Leaders of World and Traditional Religions.

== Structure ==
=== Composition ===
The People's Council of Kazakhstan consists of 126 members appointed by the president. The membership follows a strict principle of equal representation, comprising 42 members from ethnocultural associations, 42 from local maslikhats and regional public councils, and 42 from public and non-governmental organizations. The highest governing body of the council is its session, which is convened at least once a year.

=== Presidium ===
The Presidium exercises operational management over the council between sessions and coordinates its ongoing activities. In addition to the council's chairman, the Presidium includes the heads of the standing committees and prominent public figures.

=== Committees ===
The council features three standing committees:

- Committee for Development of Public Initiatives is responsible for gathering, processing, and promoting civic proposals from across the country.
- Committee for Public Accord and National Unity assumed the core functionality of the former Assembly of the People of Kazakhstan, overseeing inter-ethnic and inter-religious cooperation.
- Committee for Regional Development and Local Self-Government coordinates communication with regional public councils and maslikhats to elevate local issues to the central government level.

Additionally, the council includes an ethics commission, which monitors compliance with regulations, codes of conduct, and professional ethics among members, and a permanent secretariat that provides organizational, legal, and documentary support. By law, the council is also permitted to temporarily establish specialized working groups and sector-specific commissions to address narrow or urgent state tasks.

== Leadership ==
- Erlan Qoşanov – chairman.
- Qanatbek Jaisanbaev – deputy chairman and head of the Secretariat.

=== Presidium ===
- Chairman of the Committee on the Development of Public Initiatives – Vera Kim.
- Chairman of the Committee for Public Accord and National Unity – Marat Äzilhanov.
- Chairman of the Committee for Regional Development and Local Self-Government – Tabiğat Zeinulqabden.

=== Secretariat ===
- Qanatbek Jaisanbaev – deputy chairman and head of the Secretariat
- Oljas Danabekov – deputy head of the Secretariat.
