= Nurlan Dulatbekov =

Kazakh scientist

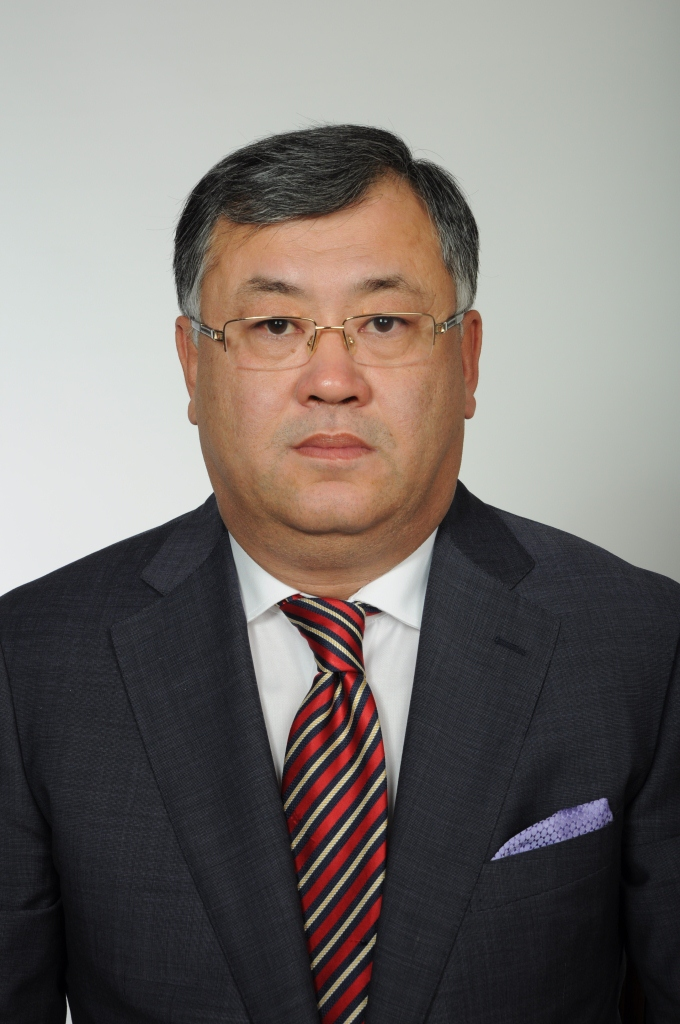
Dulatbekov in 2013

Nurlan Orynbasaruly Dulatbekov (Kazakh: Нұрлан Орынбасарұлы Дулатбеков, romanized: Nūrlan Orynbasarūly Dulatbekov; born 5 May 1962) is a Soviet and Kazakh scientist and politician. Since 1996, he has been the Chancellor of the Karagandy "Bolashak" University. A scholar in the field of criminal law and criminology, he has been a notable figure in the education system of Kazakhstan, Doctor of Law (2003), Professor (2004).

== Biography ==
Dulatbekov was born on 5 May 1962, in Aksu–Ayuly village of Shet District, Karagandy Province, the Kazakh SSR. In 1984, he graduated with honours from Karaganda State University. A student, he took an active part in social life of the university, in the province and republic. He was rewarded with the diploma of the Central Committee of the Leninist Young Communist League of the Soviet Union and that of the Leninist Young Communist League of Kazakhstan. He was elected as a delegate of the thirteenth Worldwide youth and students' festival in Korea. As a commander he headed the Republican building troop "Kazakhstan" which in 1988 took the first place among fifteen thousand building troops of the Soviet Union. After graduating from the university, he passed military service at the military tribunal of the Alma-Ata garrison.

In 1992, as a member of a group of young scientists he was accepted by the President Nursultan Nazarbayev and sent to Turkey universities to pass a scientific – pedagogical period of trainee. From 1986 to 1989, he worked as a lecturer, in 1993, as a senior lecturer, from 1993 to 1996, as an assistant professor and the head of the department of the law faculty of Karagandy State University. From 1994 to 1997, he passed scientific-pedagogical training in the universities of England, France, Belgium, Spain, and Malaysia. From 1996 by now he is the Chancellor of Karaganda "Bolashak" University.

Dulatbekov is married with two sons and a daughter.

== Scientific activity ==
Studying at the graduate school (1989–1992) he was a holder of a research grant named after Akhmet Baitursynov.

In March 1993 at the Dissertational Council of the Kazakh University of Labour Red Order Banner named after Al – Farabi he defended a dissertation on achieving the scientific degree of Candidate of Law on the theme "Individualization of criminal penalty for the crimes against life". He was a holder of a scientific grant for talented young scientists founded by the president of the Republic of Kazakhstan. In February 1995 he was conferred an academic status of an assistant professor (reader) in the field of jurisprudence.

In May 2003 he defended a dissertation on the theme "Theory and practice of imposing a penalty" on achieving the scientific degree of Doctor of Law on the speciality "Jurisprudence". In 2004 he was conferred an academic status of a Professor in the field of law sciences by the Highest Certification Commission of the Republic of Kazakhstan.

He was elected as a member-correspondent of the International Personnel academy (the Ukraine), a member-correspondent of the Academy of social sciences (Kazakhstan), an academician of the International Slavonic academy of Education named after J.A. Komensky (Moldova), an academician of the Academy of pedagogical sciences of Kazakhstan.

The author of more than 110 works:

1. Chrestomathy on the history of state and law of the Republic of Kazakhstan. 5 volumes. – Karaganda: Bolashak – Baspa, 1994–2000. – total volume – 603 p. – ISBN 978-5-8380-1322-4.
2. Dulatbekov N.O. Dictionary of law terms. – Almaty: Zheti – Zhargy, 1996.
3. Dulatbeov N., Taishybay Z. Zhakyp Akbaev. Monography. – Almaty: Zheti – Zhargy, 1997. – 90 p.
4. Dulatbekov N.O. Crime and penalty. Entertaining practice on the General part of the Criminal law. – Karaganda: Bolashak – Baspa, 1999. – 96 pages. – 200 copies. – ISBN 978-9965-477-20-1
5. Dulatbekov N.O., Amandykova S.K., Turlaev A.V. The fundamentals of the theory of state and law in the Republic of Kazakhstan: a teaching aid. – Astana: Foliant, 2000. – 284 p.
6. Dulatbekov N.O. Theory and Practice of penalty imposing = Қылмыстық жаза тағайындау (теория және практика мәселелері). – Astana: Foliant, 2002. – 446 p. – ISBN 978-9965-528-56-9
7. Dulatbekov N.O., Kruglikov L.L. The problems of differentiation and individualization of responsibility and penalty (on the example of analysis of economic crimes). – Karaganda: Karaganda State University, 2001. – 159 p.- ISBN 978-5-8397-0145-8
8. Kruglikov L.L., Dulatbekov N.O. Economic crimes (questions of differentiation and individualization of responsibility and penalty). – Yaroslavl: Yaroslavl State University, 2001.-217 p. – ISBN 978-9965-528-23-1
9. Dulatbekov N.O., Bekbergenov N.A. Imposing penalty according to cumulative crime. – Karaganda: Bolashak – Baspa, 2002. – 200 p. ISBN 978-9965-528-47-7
10. Dulatbekov N.O. Common law of the Kazakhs. (The chrestomathy on the history of state and law). – Astana: "Adilet", 2006. – 236 p.- ISBN 978-9965-784-02-6
11. Dulatbekov N.O., Syzdyk B.K., Bievaeva A.A. Қылмыстық заңнаманы мәтіндік сараптау тәжірибесі ( Experience of textological examination of the criminal legislation). – Karaganda: Bolashak – Baspa, 2008. – 184 p. ISBN 978-9965-790-74-4
12. Juvenology. The text-book for the students of higher educational institutions / edited by Dulatbekov N.O. – Almaty: Zheti-Zhargy, 2008. – 424 p. – 2000 copies.
13. Dulatbekov N.O., Zhumadilova N.T. Karlag: creativity in captivity. Artists, museums, documents, monuments. (in the Russian, Kazakh and English languages). – Karaganda, 2009.- 243 p. – ISBN 978-601-273-013-5

== Political activity ==
He is a member of the Kazakhstan national-democratic party "Nur Otan". Since 2005 - a coordinator of the Centre of Regional Headquarters of the party "Nur Otan".

Since 2007 - a deputy of the Karagandy regional maslihat on legality and human rights. He was awarded two thank letters of the President of the Republic of Kazakhstan N.A. Nazarbaev.

== Awards ==
- Order of Kurmet (May 31, 2022), Order of Friendship (II степени);
- Certificates of honor: Central Committee of the Komsomol, LKSM of Kazakhstan Почётные грамоты: ЦК ВЛКСМ, ЛКСМ Казахстана;
- Letters of thanks from the President of the Republic of Kazakhstan N.A. Nazarbayev;
- Medals

== Notes ==
1. Graduates are our pride! Karaganda State University named after E.A. Buketov. Retrieved on May 27, 2010.
2. "Leninskaya smena/Lenin shift" newspaper, the article "Answer to our pain and joy. About the delegate of the Worldwide festival" from 30.06.1989
3. "Komsomolskaya Pravda. Sobesednik" newspaper. The article "The five from 650 000" from 18.04.1989
4. Decision of the Higher Certificate Commission (HCC) of the Republic of Kazakhstan. The certificate of Candidate of Law, given by the Specialized Dissertation Council attached to the Kazakh State National University named after Al-Farabi, series ҒК № 0000636 March 4, 1993.
5. Decision of the Higher Certificate Commission (HCC) of the Republic of Kazakhstan. The certificate of Professor of Law ДЦ № 0001385 February 17, 1995
6. Decision of the Higher Certificate Commission (HCC) of the Republic of Kazakhstan. The certificate of Doctor of Law, series ҒД № 0003351 January 29, 2004 (proceedings № 1).
7. Decision of the Higher Certificate Commission (HCC) of the Republic of Kazakhstan. The certificate of Professor of Law, series ПФ № 0003351 October 28, 2004 (proceedings № 8).
