= List of Äkims of Karaganda Region =

This is the list of äkıms of Karaganda Region that have held the position since 1992.

== List of Äkıms ==
- Pyotr Nefyodov (6 February 1992 – 4 July 1997)
- Mäjit Esenbaev (4 July 1997 – 12 October 1999)
- Kamaltin Mūhamedjanov (13 October 1999 – 19 January 2006)
- Nūrlan Nyğmatulin (19 January 2006 – 19 November 2009)
- Serık Ahmetov (19 November 2009 – 20 January 2012)
- Äbılğazy Qūsaiynov (20 January 2012 – 28 January 2013)
- Bauyrjan Äbdışev (29 January 2013 – 20 June 2014)
- Nūrmūhambet Äbdıbekov (20 June 2014 – 14 March 2017)
- Erlan Qoşanov (14 March 2017 – 18 September 2019)
- Jeñıs Qasymbek (19 September 2019 – 8 December 2022)
- Ermağanbet Bölekpaev (since 8 December 2022)
