= Sarsen Amanzholov East Kazakhstan State University =

University in Ust-Kamenogorsk, Kazakhstan

Coordinates: 49°57′38.6″N 82°35′28.3″E

Sarsen Amanzholov East Kazakhstan University
- Сәрсен Аманжолов атындағы Шығыс Қазақстан университеті
- Former names: Ust-Kamenogorsk Pedagogical Institute; East Kazakhstan State University
- Type: Public
- Rector: Tolegen Adilbekuly
- Location: 30th Gvardialyq Divizia Street, 34, Oskemen, Kazakhstan
- Campus: Urban
- Website: vkgu.kz

University rankings

Regional – Overall
- QS Emerging Europe and Central Asia: 251-300 (2022)

The Sarsen Amanzholov East Kazakhstan University (Kazakh: Сәрсен Аманжолов атындағы Шығыс Қазақстан университеті, romanized: Särsen Amanjolov atyndağy Şyğys Qazaqstan universitetı) is a leading multidisciplinary higher educational institution in Oskemen, Kazakhstan.

== History ==
In 1952, according to the order of the Council of Ministers of the USSR, the Ust-Kamenogorsk Pedagogical Institute (UKPI) was organized, which consisted of 3 faculties (Russian language and literature, physics and mathematics and natural science). 332 students studied at the institute, 30 teachers worked, including 3 candidates of sciences, associate professors. In 1953, the first graduation of young specialists in the teaching program took place. The first graduation of specialists in the four-year program took place in 1956.

In the 1961–1962 academic year, the university had 4 faculties, 2907 students, 121 teachers, of whom 21 are candidates of sciences.

In 1970, the faculty for advanced training of teachers of pedagogical schools of the Republic of Central Asia and Kazakhstan was created. In 1971, an educational and information studio was opened, which has an educational and information studio. In the 1971–1972 academic year, the university consisted of 5 faculties, where 4141 students studied, 286 teachers worked, out of 2 doctors of sciences, professors, 64 candidates of sciences. In 1982, UKPI became the winner of the competition among 262 pedagogical universities of the Soviet Union.

In 1984, the UKPI was awarded an honorary diploma of the Supreme Soviet of the Kazakh SSR for the achieved production successes, high performance in residential premises, cultural and domestic facilities, active work in collective and state farms of the republic. The university consisted of 9 faculties with 4,700 students.

In 1991, the Government of Kazakhstan decided to create the East Kazakhstan State University (EKSU). At that time, it consisted of 11 faculties, where 4901 students studied, 462 teachers worked, including 7 doctors of sciences, professors, 133 candidates of sciences. In 1992, a postgraduate course was opened in 16 specialties, and in 1994: a magistracy. That same year, the first graduation of bachelors from EKSU took place. In 1995, the university was granted the right of the State University to confer the academic title "Professor of VK".

In 2001, the Mongolian branch of the East Kazakhstan State University was opened in the city of Ölgii.

In 2002, during the 50th anniversary of UKPI, the university included 7 institutes, 40 departments, about 9,500 students studied at the university in 60 specialties, 600 teachers led their training, among 11 academicians and corresponding members of the State and industry Academies of Sciences, 40 professors, doctors of sciences, about 200 candidates of sciences.

On 3 October 2003, the university was named after scientist-linguist and professor Sarsen Amanzholov. An international scientific-practical conference dedicated to his 100th anniversary was held on the basis of the university.

As of 2004, more than 12 thousand rubles studied at EKSU. Students, specialists were trained by 625 teachers, including 208 employees of sciences and professors, doctors of sciences and associate professors. The university included 8 institutes, a multidisciplinary college, an institute for advanced training of scientific and pedagogical personnel, 5 research institutes, 4 problem research laboratories, a computer technology center, a distance learning center with an information and educational corporate network, a scientific library with bar coding technology and anti-theft system, a publishing house, a museum of history and development of the university, an agro-biological station "Pankratyevsky Garden", an educational and research and production base "Sibina", an educational and production base with subsidiary farming (130 hectares of farmland) "Arshaly", an educational and health-improving complex with swimming pool "Chaika".

== Faculties and programs ==
Currently, the EKSU includes the following structural formations:

- Faculty of History, Philology and International Relations
- Faculty of Psychology, Pedagogy and Culture
- Faculty of Natural Sciences and Technology
- Faculty of Economics and Law
- Qualification confirmation center
- Center for Marketing and Pre-University Training
- Distance learning faculty
- Master's Degree program
