= Erlan Qoşanov =

Kazakh politician (born 1962)

- Ерлан Қошанов
- Qoşanov in 2023

Chairman of People's Council of Kazakhstan
- Incumbent
- Assumed office 23 September 2026
- President: Kassym-Jomart Tokayev
- Succeeded by: Office established

Chairman of Amanat
- In office 26 April 2022 – 12 June 2026
- Preceded by: Kassym-Jomart Tokayev
- Succeeded by: Office abolished (Amanat merged into the Ädilet)

Chairman of the Mäjilis
- In office 1 February 2022 – 1 July 2026
- Deputy: See list: Pavel Kazantsev (2022–2023); Balaim Kesebaeva (2022–2023); Albert Rau (2023–2026); Dania Espaeva (2023–2026)
- Preceded by: Nurlan Nigmatulin
- Succeeded by: Office abolished (Aibek Dädebai as chairman of the Kurultai)

Member of the Mäjilis
- In office 1 February 2022 – 1 July 2026
- Preceded by: Nurlan Nigmatulin
- Succeeded by: Office abolished

Aqorda Chief of Staff
- In office 18 September 2019 – 1 February 2022
- President: Kassym-Jomart Tokayev
- First Deputy: Mäulen Äşimbaev; Dauren Abaev
- Preceded by: Krymbek Kusherbayev
- Succeeded by: Murat Nurtileu

Äkim of Karaganda Region
- In office 14 March 2017 – 18 September 2019
- President: Nursultan Nazarbayev
- Preceded by: Nurmuhambet Abdibekov
- Succeeded by: Zhenis Kassymbek

Chief of Staff of the Prime Minister's Office
- In office 2 February 2012 – 14 March 2017
- Prime Minister: Karim Massimov; Serik Akhmetov; Karim Massimov; Bakhytzhan Sagintayev
- Preceded by: Krymbek Kusherbayev
- Succeeded by: Gabidolla Abdirahymov

Member of the Senate
- In office 1996–1999

Personal details
- Born: 14 August 1962 (age 64) Aqsu-Aiuly, Shet, Karaganda Region, Kazakh SSR, Soviet Union (now Kazakhstan)
- Party: Independent (since 2026)
- Other political affiliations: Democratic Party (1995–1996); Amanat (1999–2026)
- Spouse: Güljan Abauova
- Children: 2
- Education: Karaganda State Technical University; All-Russian Academy of Foreign Trade; Narxoz University

Erlan Jaqanūly Qoşanov (Note: Kazakh: Ерлан Жақанұлы Қошанов, pronounced [jerɫɑ́n ʒɑqʰɑ́nʊɫə́ qʰoʃɑ́nəf]) (Note: Often transliterated as Yerlan Zhakanovich Koshanov through a Russified Romanization of Ерлан Жаканович Кошанов.) (born 14 August 1962) is a Kazakh politician serving as the chairman of People's Council of Kazakhstan since 2026. Previously, he was a member of the Mäjilis and as its chairman from 2022 until the chamber's abolition in 2026, becoming the last chairman of the Mäjilis. Prior to that, he served as the Aqorda Chief of Staff under Kassym-Jomart Tokayev's administration from 2019 to 2022, äkim of Karaganda Region from 2017 to 2019 and the head of the Prime Minister's Office from 2012 to 2017.

As a member of the ruling Amanat party, Qoşanov from 2022 to 2026 has headed the party following Tokayev's brief leadership in response to Nursultan Nazarbayev's resignation after leading the formerly Nur Otan party. While serving as deputy, Qoşanov headed the Amanat parliamentary group in the lower house Mäjilis during the 7th convocation until its dissolution in 2023. Since then, Qoşanov continued serving in the 8th convocation of the Mäjilis as the chairman following his re-election to the post in March 2023.

== Biography ==
=== Early life and education ===
Qoşanov was born in the village of Aqsu-Aiuly, Karaganda Region. In 1984, he graduated from the Dzhezkazgan Branch of the Karaganda State Technical University with a degree in mechanical engineering and then in 1991, from the Higher Commercial School at the All-Russian Academy of Foreign Trade. In 1999, Qoşanov graduated from the Narxoz University with a degree in economics. He also served in the ranks of the Soviet Army.

=== Early career ===
From 1986 to 1988, Qoşanov worked as a mechanic, then as a foreman at the Dzhezkazgantsvetmet concentration plant. In 1988, he became an instructor of the Dzhezkazgan Regional Committee of the Lenin Communist Youth Union of Kazakhstan. From 1990, Qoşanov was the leading, chief specialist, head of department, deputy chairman, and then the chairman of the Jezkazgan Regional Committee for Wind Farm.

=== Political career ===
In 1995, he became the Secretary of the Jezkazgan Regional Committee of the Democratic Party of Kazakhstan and in December 1995, Qoşanov was elected as a member of the Senate of Kazakhstan. He served the post until he was appointed as a representative of the Government in the Parliament of Kazakhstan in February 1999.

From November 2001 to June 2003, Qoşanov was the Deputy Head of the Prime Minister's Office until he was appointed as Vice Minister of Transport and Communications of the Republic of Kazakhstan. In February 2006, he was appointed as the Chairman of the Civil Aviation Committee of the Ministry of Transport and Communications. From 2007, he served as the Deputy Head of the Prime Minister's Office and a representative of the Government in the Mazhilis.

On 2 February 2012, Qoşanov was appointed as the head of Prime Minister's Office. He served the post until he was appointed as the äkim of Karaganda Region on 14 March 2017. From 18 September 2019, he worked as chief of staff in the Presidential Administration of Kazakhstan under Kassym-Jomart Tokayev.

==== Chairman of the Mäjilis (2022–2026) ====
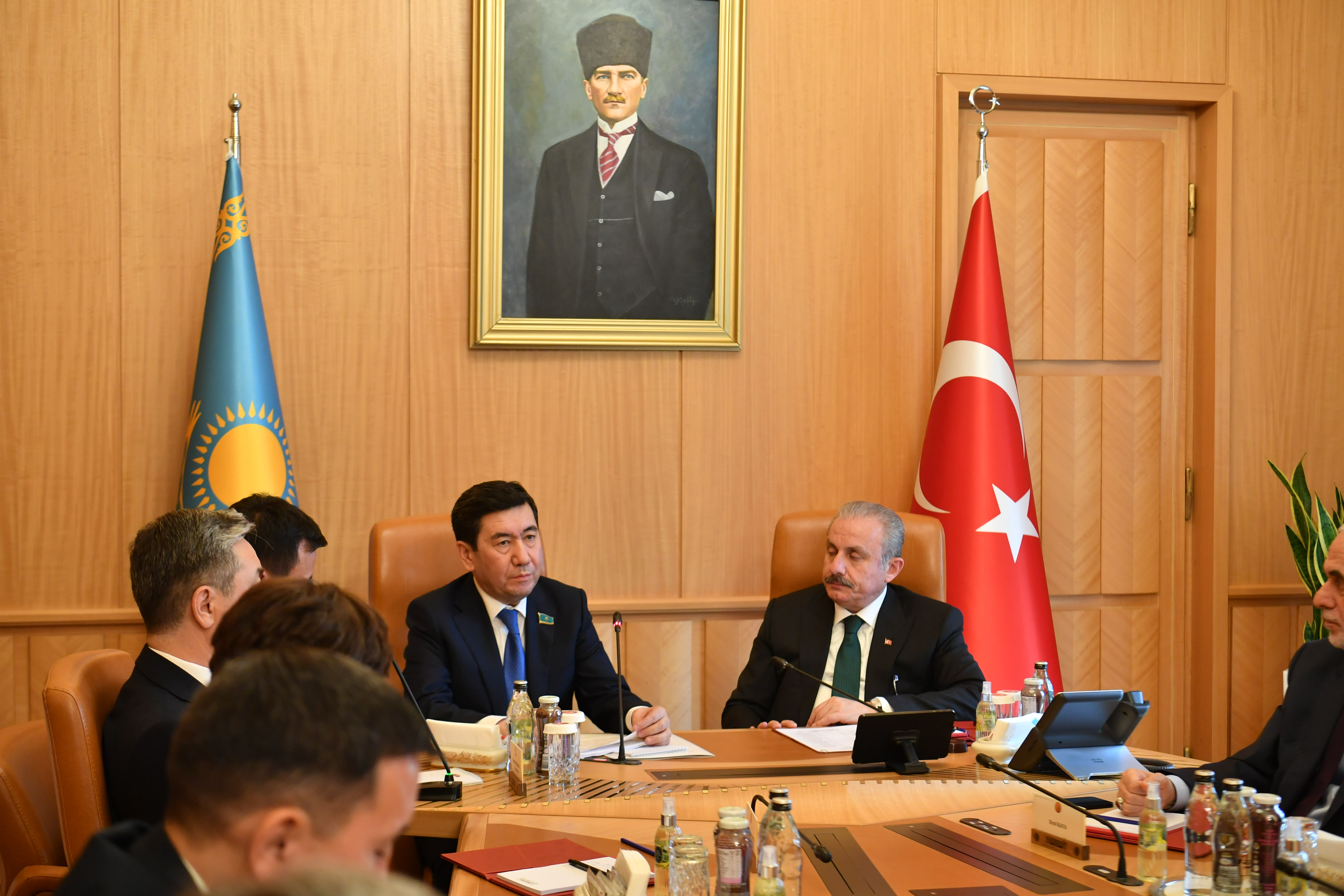
Qoşanov and Mustafa Şentop in Ankara, April 2023

Following resignation of Nurlan Nigmatulin as the Mäjilis chairman, Qoşanov became a deputy of Mäjilis for the lower house Parliament and was subsequently elected as the new chairman of the chamber on 1 February 2022. Qoşanov's nomination was proposed by Nur Otan MP Erlan Sairov who noted his experience in many fields including legislation while Qoşanov himself at the hearing thanked the support, stressing that President Tokayev's proposed reforms is "is our common task."

On 14 February 2022, Qoşanov was elected as the parliamentary leader of Nur Otan. From there, he stressed that the party should be actively involved in its transformation by fully contributing to increasing the effectiveness to carry out the presidential course of reforms. He also instructed for the Mäjilis to strengthen the quality of legislative activity, increase the relevance of lawmakers' requests, and strengthen interaction with the Nur Otan Central Office on analytics and work in the regions.

Since 26 April 2022, he has been appointed chairman of the Amanat party.

On 29 March 2023, he was re-elected chairman of the Mäjilis of the Parliament of Kazakhstan.

==== Abolition of the office ====
On 1 July 2026, the post of the chairman of the Mäjilis was abolished as part of constitutional reforms that replaced the bicameral parliamentary system with a unicameral Kurultai.

=== People's Council of Kazakhstan ===
On September 23, 2026, at the People's Council of Kazakhstan first meeting, president Kassym-Jomart Tokayev nominated Erlan Qoşanov for chairman and 120 out of 126 members voted for him.
