= Asset Issekeshev =

Kazakh politician (born 1971)

Äset Isekeshev
- Әсет Исекешев
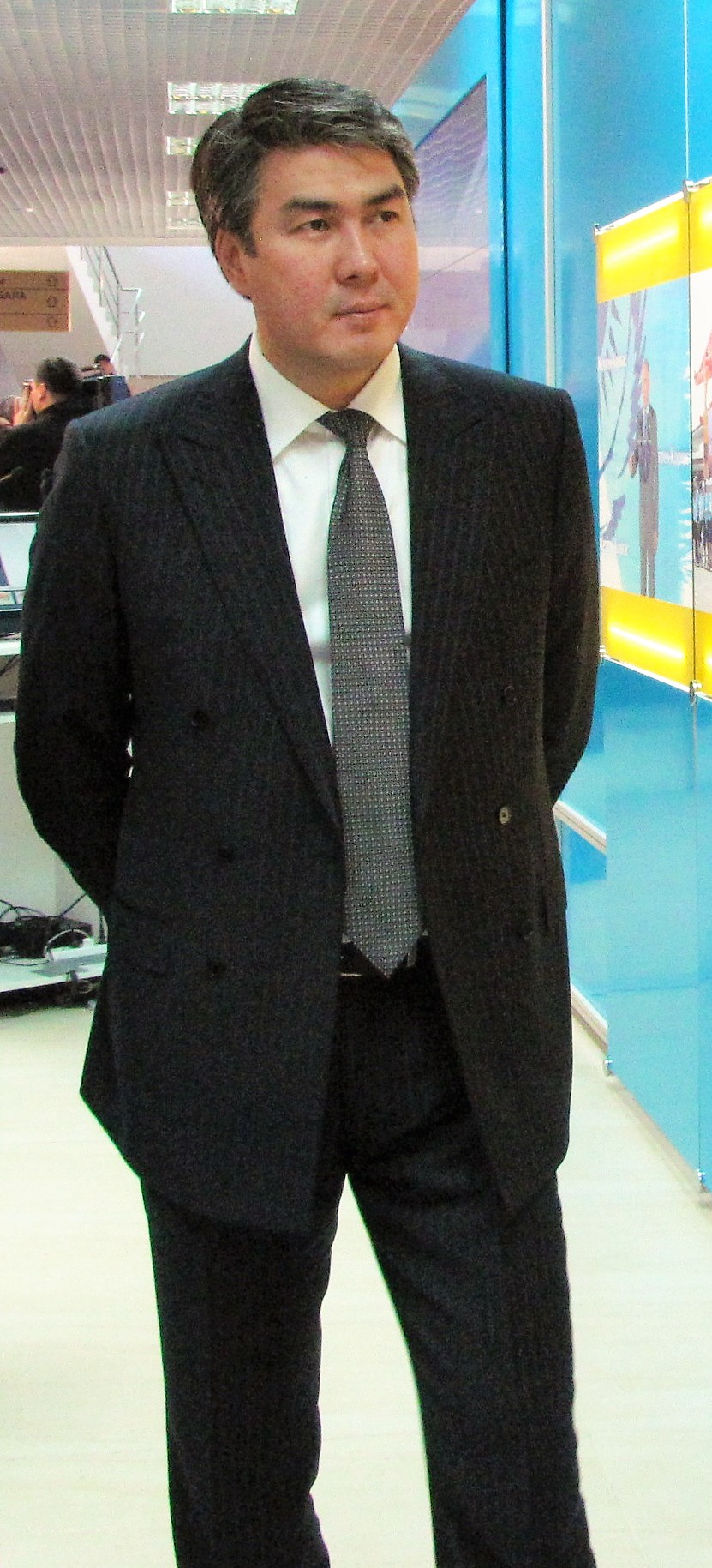
- Isekeshev in 2011

Aide to the President of Kazakhstan
- In office 2020–2023
- President: Nursultan Nazarbaev; Kassym-Jomart Tokayev
- President: Kassym-Jomart Tokayev
- Preceded by: Kalmukhanbet Kassymov

Head of the Presidential Administration of Kazakhstan
- In office 10 September 2018 – 24 March 2019
- President: Nursultan Nazarbaev; Kassym-Jomart Tokayev
- First Deputy: Marat Tazhin
- Preceded by: Adilbek Zhaksybekov
- Succeeded by: Bakhytzhan Sagintayev

Minister of Investment and Development
- In office 6 August 2014 – 21 June 2016
- President: Nursultan Nazarbayev
- Prime Minister: Karim Massimov
- Preceded by: Office established
- Succeeded by: Zhenis Kassymbek

Deputy Prime Minister for Industry and New Technologies
- In office 12 March 2010 – 6 August 2014
- President: Nursultan Nazarbayev
- Prime Minister: Karim Massimov; Serik Akhmetov
- Preceded by: Office established
- Succeeded by: Office abolished

Minister of Industry and Trade
- In office 21 May 2009 – 12 March 2010
- President: Nursultan Nazarbayev
- Prime Minister: Karim Massimov
- Preceded by: Vladimir Shkolnik
- Succeeded by: Office abolished

8th Mayor of Astana
- In office 21 June 2016 – 11 September 2018
- Preceded by: Adilbek Zhaksybekov
- Succeeded by: Bakhyt Sultanov

Personal details
- Born: 17 August 1971 (age 55) Karaganda, Kazakh SSR, Soviet Union
- Party: Amanat
- Spouse: Läzzat Isekesheva

Äset Örentaiūly İsekeşev (Note: Often transliterated as Asset Urentayevich Isekeshev through a Russified Romanization of Асет Урентаевич Исекешев.) (Kazakh: Әсет Өрентайұлы Исекешев; born 17 August 1971) is a Kazakh politician and public figure, currently the Chairman of the higher council of the Alliance of technological companies "Qaztech" since 2024. He previously served as an aide to the President of Kazakhstan and the Secretary of the Security Council since January 2020. Before that, he served as the executive director of the Fund of the First President of Kazakhstan from March 2019 to January 2020, head of the Presidential Administration from September 2018 to March 2019, mayor of Astana from June 2016 to September 2018, Deputy Prime Minister and Minister of Industry and New Technologies from March 2010 to August 2014, and Minister of Investments and Development from August 2014 to June 2016.

== Biography ==
=== Early life and education ===
Äset Isekeshev was born in 1971 in Qaraghandy. In 1994, he graduated from the Al-Farabi Kazakh National University with a degree in law and later graduated from the Higher School of Public Administration in 1998.

=== Career ===
In 1989, he was a fitter-assembler of radio equipment at the Omega Ural plant. From 1995 to 1997, he worked as the assistant and senior assistant attorney in Medeu district of southeastern Almaty. In 1998, he became a chief specialist of the Agency for Strategic Planning and Reforms of the Republic of Kazakhstan.

From 1999 to 2000, he worked as director of the Department for Registration and Control over normative legal acts of central and local bodies of the Ministry of Justice. In 2000, Isekeshev became the president of ZAO National Legal Service. From 2001 to 2002, he served as the first deputy chairman of APK Sunkar LLP, president of National Consulting Group LLP, vice president for corporate development and legal issues, first vice president of Ordabasy Corporation OJSC.

In November 2002, Isekeshev became an advisor to the Minister of Economy and Budget Planning Qairat Kelimbetov. In June 2003, he became Vice Minister of Industry and Trade.

From May 2006, Isekeshev served as deputy chairman of the board of Qazyna Sustainable Development Fund JSC. From 2007 to 2008, he was the marketing director of Financial Projects LLP Credit Swiss Kazakhstan.

In February 2008, he was appointed as the assistant to the President of Kazakhstan and served that position until becoming the Minister of Industry and Trade on 21 May 2009. On 12 March 2010, Isekeshev was appointed as the Deputy Prime Minister of Kazakhstan and Minister of Industry and New Technologies in Mäsimov's cabinet. He was reappointed after the Ministry was reorganized on 6 August 2014 as Minister of Investment and Development.

On 21 June 2016, Isekeshev became the mayor of Astana. Under his leadership, Isekeshev earned nickname by the residents of Astana as "most people's mayor" due to his feedback on social networks, in particular on Facebook. Isekeshev was seen replying to residents on the social media at 2am. Due to the large number of requests to the mayor, a joke "tag Isekeshev" even appeared in the Kazakhstan's social media. Isekeshev also warned residents and guests of the city on his pages about the upcoming precipitation and cheered up Astana residents with news about good weather.

From 10 September 2018 to 24 March 2019, Isekeshev was the head of the Presidential Administration of Kazakhstan, replacing the retired Ädilbek Zhaqsybekov. On 25 March 2019, he became the executive director of the Fund of the First President and then on 16 January 2020, Isekeshev was appointed as the secretary of the Security Council. Since 2024, he is the Chairman of the higher council of the Alliance of technological companies "Qaztech" since 2024.
