= Äkim of Astana =

Mayor of Astana

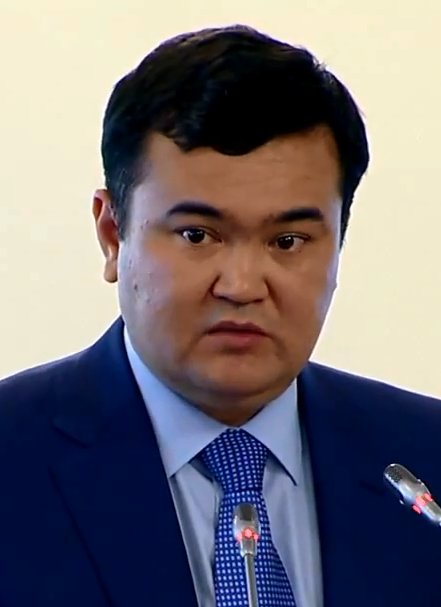
- Incumbent; Zhenis Kassymbek since 8 December 2022
- Appointer: President
- Inaugural holder: Amanjol Bölekpaev
- Formation: 1992

Flag of the City Astana

The Äkim of Astana (Kazakh: Astana äkımı, Астана әкімі) is the chief authority in the capital city of Kazakhstan, Astana (formerly Nur-Sultan). The position was established in 1997 when the capital was moved to Astana from Almaty. Currently the position is being held by Zhenis Kassymbek.

== List of äkims of Astana since 1991 ==
- Amanjol Bölekpaev (1992–1997)
- Ädılbek Jaqsybekov (1997–2003)
- Temırhan Dosmūhambetov (2003–2004)
- Ömırzaq Şökeev (2004–2006)
- Asqar Mamin (2006–2008)
- İmanğali Tasmağambetov (2008–2014)
- Ädılbek Jaqsybekov (2014–2016)
- Äset İsekeşev (2016–2018)
- Baqyt Sūltanov (2018–2019)
- Altai Kölgınov (2019–2022)
- Zhenis Kassymbek (2022–present)
