= Tugyl =

Tugyl Тұғыл
- Location within Kazakhstan
- Coordinates: 47°43′42.6″N 84°12′16.96″E
- Country: Kazakhstan
- Region: East Kazakhstan Region
- District: Tarbagatay District

Population (2009)
  - Total: 4,744
- Time zone: UTC+6 (+6)
- Post code: 071515

Tugyl (Kazakh: Тұғыл, Tūğyl) is a village in the Tarbagatay District of the East Kazakhstan Region. The administrative center of the Tugyl rural district. It is located approximately 105 km east of the regional center, the village of Aksuat. Before 1992, the village was called Priozyornoe.

The largest enterprise in Kazakhstan for fishing and production of fish products Jaisanbalyq is located in the village.

== Population ==
In 1999, the population of the village was 7,483 people. According to this census in 2009, 4,744 people lived in the village.

== Climate ==
Tugyl has a cold semi-arid climate (Köppen: BSk), characterized by extremely cold winters and warm summers.

Climate data for Tugyl (1991–2020)
Month	Jan	Feb	Mar	Apr	May	Jun	Jul	Aug	Sep	Oct	Nov	Dec	Year
Mean daily maximum °C (°F)	−14.1 (6.6)	−10.3 (13.5)	−1.2 (29.8)	12.5 (54.5)	20.9 (69.6)	26.6 (79.9)	28.4 (83.1)	26.7 (80.1)	20.0 (68.0)	11.3 (52.3)	−0.1 (31.8)	−9.9 (14.2)	9.2 (48.6)
Daily mean °C (°F)	−19.7 (−3.5)	−16.4 (2.5)	−6.8 (19.8)	6.3 (43.3)	14.6 (58.3)	20.9 (69.6)	22.8 (73.0)	20.9 (69.6)	13.9 (57.0)	5.9 (42.6)	−4.5 (23.9)	−14.8 (5.4)	3.6 (38.5)
Mean daily minimum °C (°F)	−25.4 (−13.7)	−22.6 (−8.7)	−12.4 (9.7)	1.0 (33.8)	8.2 (46.8)	14.6 (58.3)	16.9 (62.4)	14.8 (58.6)	7.4 (45.3)	0.2 (32.4)	−9.0 (15.8)	−20.1 (−4.2)	−2.2 (28.0)
Average precipitation mm (inches)	11.3 (0.44)	8.2 (0.32)	11.8 (0.46)	16.9 (0.67)	21.0 (0.83)	19.6 (0.77)	23.7 (0.93)	15.0 (0.59)	14.0 (0.55)	19.7 (0.78)	20.6 (0.81)	12.8 (0.50)	194.6 (7.66)
Average precipitation days (≥ 1.0 mm)	3.7	2.9	3.1	4.0	4.4	4.1	5.1	4.0	3.6	4.3	4.7	4.2	48.1
Source: NOAA
