= Temirkhan Dosmukhanbetov =

Kazakhstani politician (1949–2021)

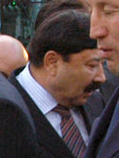
Dosmukhanbetov in 2005

Temirkhan Myngaydaruly Dosmukhanbetov (Kazakh: Темірхан Мыңайдарұлы Досмұханбетов, Temırhan Myñaidarūly Dosmūhanbetov; 8 March 1949 – 1 November 2021) was a Kazakhstani politician, who served as the Minister of Tourism and Sports in the Government of Kazakhstan since Kazakh President Nursultan Nazarbayev appointed him on 27 March 2006. Prior to that he served as the mayor of Astana. Nazarbayev appointed him mayor, replacing Adilbek Jaksybekov, on 16 June 2006. Jaksebekov then became the Minister of Trade and Industry.

== Appointment to Minister of Culture and Information ==
President Nazarbayev split the Ministry of Culture, Information and Sport into a Culture and Information Ministry and a Tourism and Sport Ministry through a presidential decree on 27 March 2006. Nazarbayev then appointed Ermukhamet Ertysbayev, previously the Culture, Information, and Sport Minister, the Minister of the new Culture and Information Ministry while making Dosmukhanbetov the Minister of the new Tourism and Sport Ministry.
