= Asqar Mamin =

Prime Minister of Kazakhstan from 2019 to 2022

- Асқар Мамин
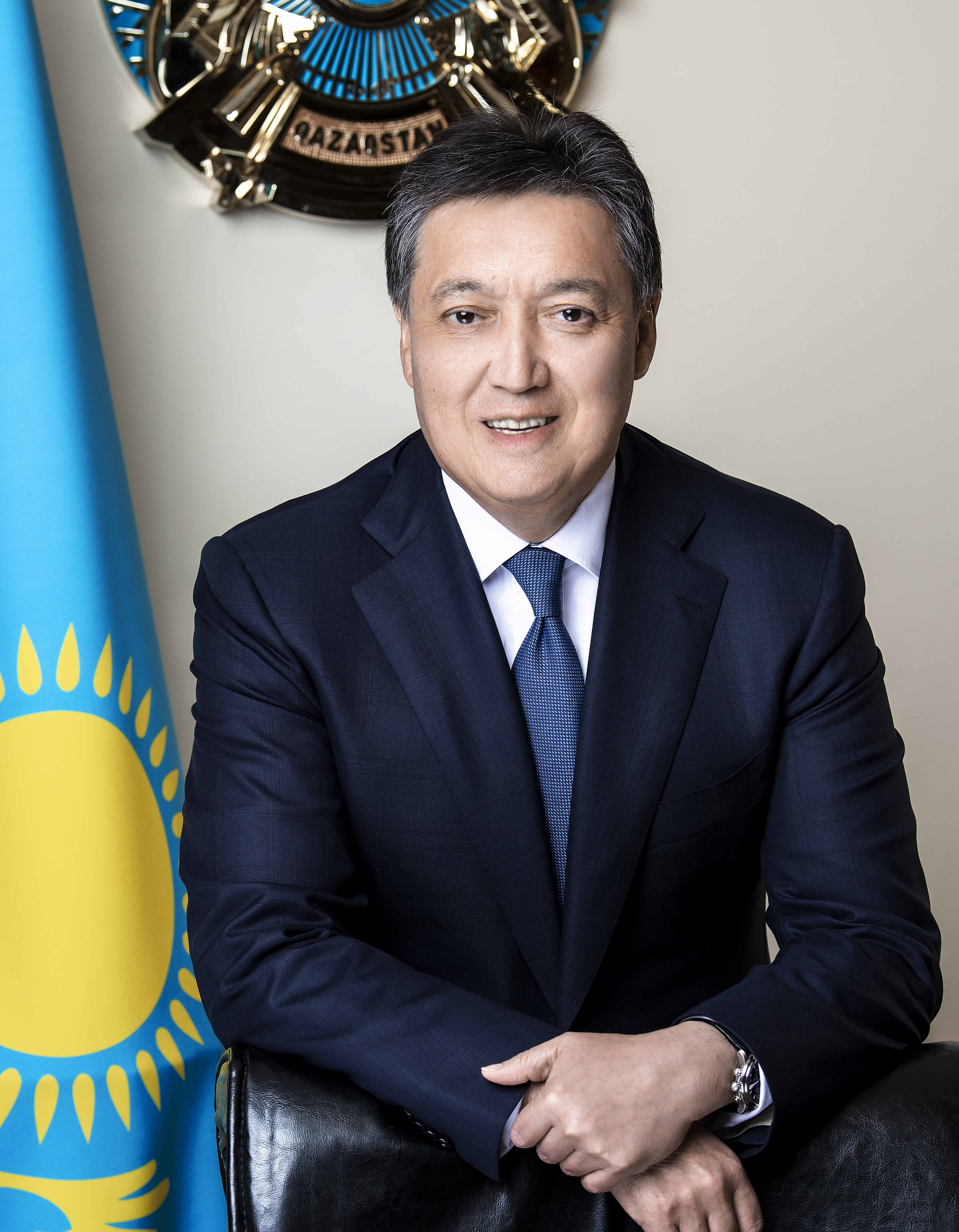
- Official portrait, 2020

10th Prime Minister of Kazakhstan
- In office 21 February 2019 – 5 January 2022
- President: Nursultan Nazarbayev; Kassym-Jomart Tokayev
- First Deputy: Alihan Smaiylov
- Preceded by: Bakhytzhan Sagintayev
- Succeeded by: Älihan Smaiylov

First Deputy Prime Minister of Kazakhstan
- In office 8 September 2016 – 21 February 2019
- Prime Minister: Bakhytzhan Sagintayev
- Preceded by: Bakhytzhan Sagintayev
- Succeeded by: Alihan Smaiylov

Chairman of Kazakhstan Engineering
- In office 17 July 2017 – 2020
- Preceded by: Erlan Idrissov
- Succeeded by: Sarsembaev Adlbek

President of Kazakhstan Temir Zholy
- In office 17 April 2008 – 9 September 2016
- Preceded by: Zhaksybek Kulekeyev
- Succeeded by: Kanat Alpysbayev

5th Äkim of Astana
- In office 21 September 2006 – 4 April 2008
- Preceded by: Umirzak Shukeyev
- Succeeded by: Imangali Tasmagambetov

Minister of Transport and Communications
- In office 25 August 2005 – 21 September 2006
- Prime Minister: Daniyal Akhmetov
- Preceded by: Kazhmurat Nagmanov
- Succeeded by: Serik Akhmetov

Personal details
- Born: 23 October 1965 (age 60) Tselinograd, Kazakh SSR, Soviet Union
- Party: Amanat
- Spouse: Altynai Mamina
- Children: 2
- Education: Tselinograd Civil Engineering Institute; Plekhanov Russian University of Economics
- Profession: Economist

Asqar Ūzaqbaiūly Mamin (Note: Kazakh: Асқар Ұзақбайұлы Мамин, [ɑsqʰɑ́r ʊzɑqb̥ɑ́jʊɫə́ mámʲɪn]; Russian: Аскар Узакпаевич Мамин, romanized: Askar Uzakpayevich Mamin, IPA: [ɐsˈkar ʊzɐkˈpajevʲɪtɕ mámʲɪn]) (born 23 October 1965) is a Kazakh politician and economist who served as the Prime Minister of Kazakhstan from 2019 to 2022, resigning due to pressure from the 2022 Kazakh unrest. He served as First Deputy Prime Minister from 9 September 2016 to 21 February 2019. Previously, he was the president of the Kazakhstan Temir Zholy, the national railway company of Kazakhstan. He also serves as the president of the Kazakhstan Ice Hockey Federation, a position he assumed in 2008.

A member of the ruling Kazakhstan's political party Nur Otan, Mamin previously served as äkim of Astana from 2006 to 2008, and as Minister of Transport and Communication in Daniyal Akhmetov Cabinet from 2005 to 2006, and as First Deputy Prime Minister of the Republic of Kazakhstan from 2016 to 2019 and Prime Minister of the Republic of Kazakhstan from 2019 to 2022.

== Early life and career ==
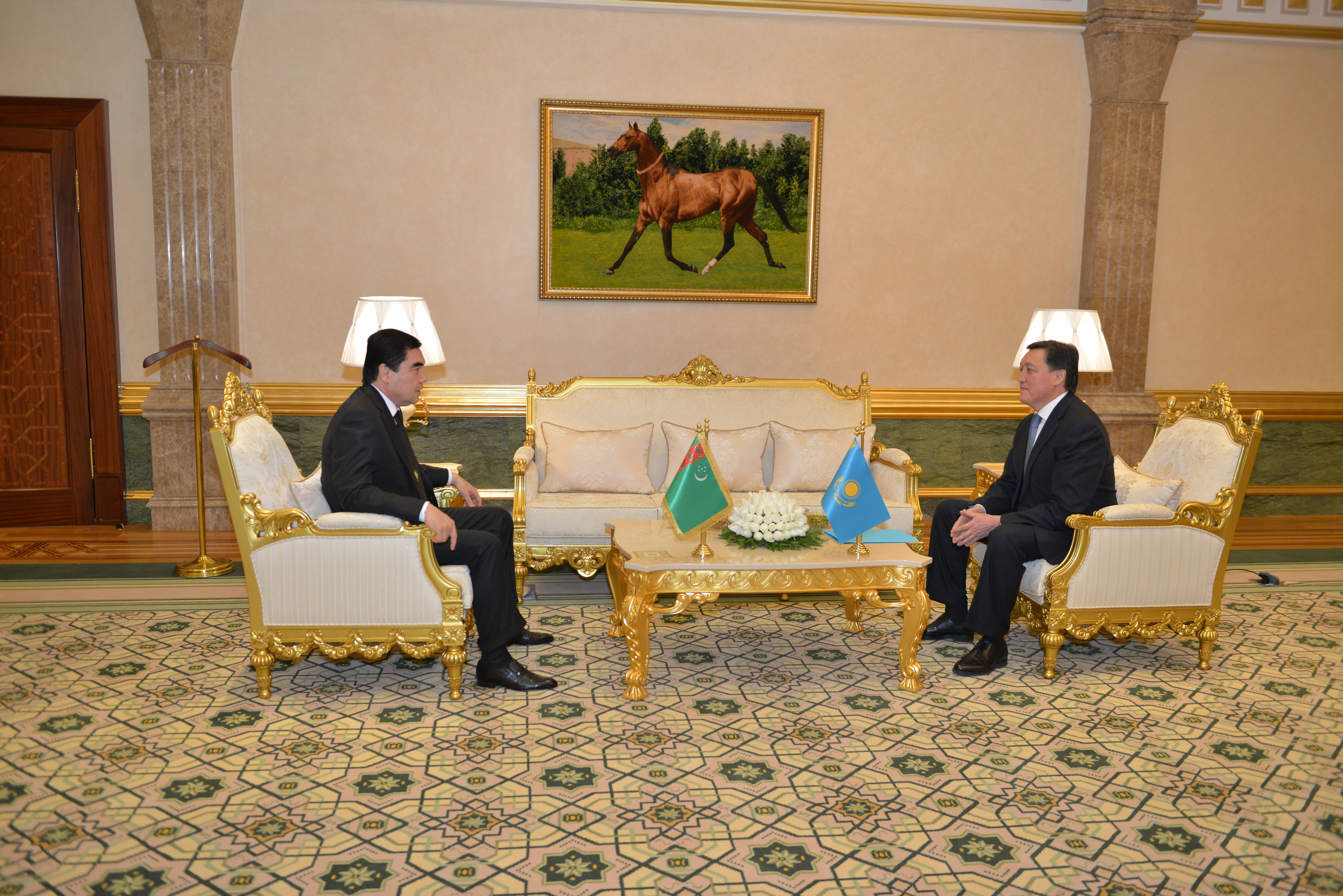
Mamin with the President of Turkmenistan Gurbanguly Berdimuhamedow in 2016

Mamin was born in Tselinograd (now Astana). He graduated from the Tselinograd Civil Engineering Institute and the Plekhanov Russian University of Economics with civil engineering and economics specialties.

He began his career as an erector of Tselintyazhstroy trust. He served as deputy director general of Innovative Enterprises Union of Kazakhstan. From 1996 to 2008, he served as the first deputy äkim of Astana, Vice Minister of Transport and Communications of the Republic of Kazakhstan, First Vice Minister of Industry and Trade of the Republic of Kazakhstan. On 21 September 2006, Mamin was appointed as the äkim of Astana. He served that position until he became the president of Kazakhstan Temir Zholy on 17 April 2008.

On 9 September 2016, he was appointed as the First Deputy Prime Minister in Sagintayev Cabinet. On 8 January 2018, Mamin joined the board of directors of the national company Kazakh Tourism.

== Prime Minister of Kazakhstan (2019–2022) ==
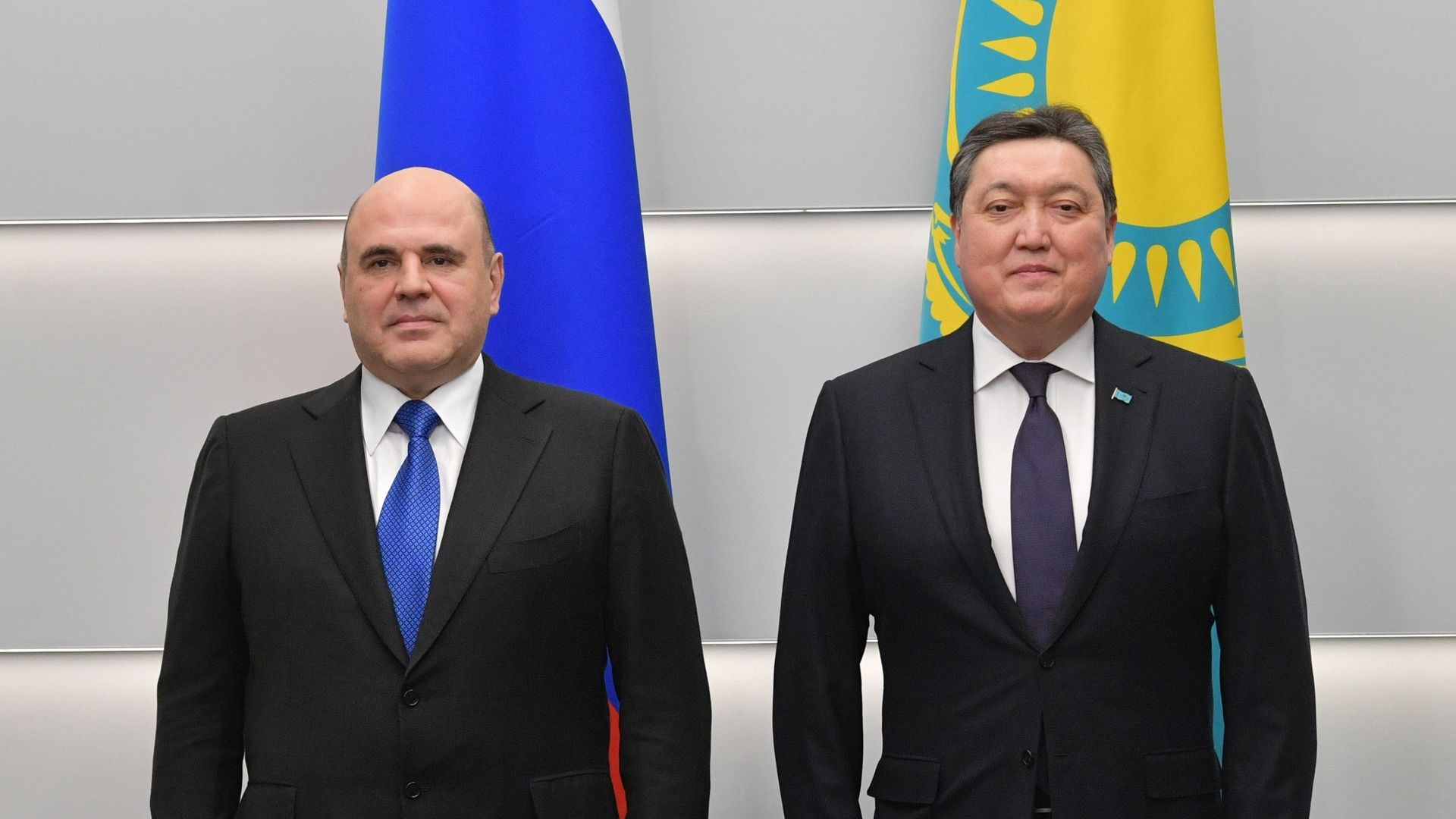
Mamin with the Prime Minister of Russia Mikhail Mishustin in 2021

=== Appointment ===
On 21 February 2019, Prime Minister Bakhytzhan Sagintayev was dismissed by President Nursultan Nazarbayev. As a result, Mamin became the Acting PM and was confirmed by the Parliament unanimously to be the new PM on 25 February. The following day on 26 February, Mamin at the meeting with the cabinet telling that the government should aim at "concrete results" that would improve of the quality of life of the population.

On 10 January 2021, President Kassym-Jomart Tokayev called for the resignation of the government in accordance with the legislation on the day of the 2021 legislative elections which were held in Kazakhstan. Speculations arose regarding Mamin's fate, in which it was widely expected that he would retain it while among other likely contenders to possibly replace Mamin's prime ministerial post were seen as Bauyrjan Baibek, Nurlan Nigmatulin, Aset Isekeşev, Qanat Bozumbaev, Erbolat Dosaev or Baqyt Sultanov. Former president and Nur Otan chairman Nursultan Nazarbayev endorsed for Mamin's re-appointment, stating that the government has done its job contrary in other countries. On 15 January, Tokayev re-nominated Mamin to the post of the PM at the opening session of the 7th Parliament of Kazakhstan with 78 out of 99 deputies support while the rest abstained, marking it the first time since 2007, that the PM had not received unanimous support. From there, Mamin was criticised by the parliamentary opposition over his handling of the COVID-19 pandemic. At the session, Mamin thanked the deputies for support, outlining that effective measures would be taken in improving quality of life, increasing income and welfare, attracting investment, introducing new technologies, and creating workers' months.

=== Term ===
On 24 June 2019, a fire broke out in an ammo storage near the town of Arys in Turkistan Region, resulting in a huge explosion where three people died and 89 of them were injured. Mamin, on the behalf of Tokayev, visited the town on 29 June and from there, he ordered all repairs from the damage to be completed by 1 August 2019. For the restoration, 56.1 billion tenge was allocated, of which 27.5 billion were from the government's reserve. On 2 August, Mamin re-visited the town where he expressed gratitude to everyone who was involved in the repairs, calling it "a tremendous work" as 90% of restoration by then was completed.

By 2019, the GDP growth rate in Kazakhstan accounted 4.5%, a higher than expected figure thanks to a driven growth generated by the construction, transport, trade and communications industry, contrary to as the Kazakh Government and World Bank expected the range to be 3.5 to 3.8% rate. On 24 January 2020, at the government meeting, Mamin outlined key goals in ensuring the economic growth of 4.7 to 5% for 2020 with a given task in creating 430,000 new jobs and increasing real incomes for the population. A strategic objective was unveiled which aimed at increasing the volume of fixed investments by an average of 15% annually and to bring its level to 30% of GDP by 2025.

Amid the unrest in January 2022, he resigned his post.

==== COVID-19 ====
With the outbreak of COVID-19 in Wuhan, Mamin, at the meeting with officials on 26 January 2020 instructed several preventive measures to be implemented in order to prevent spread of the virus such as strengthening sanitary, epidemiological and migration control at the borders, travel restrictions to China, suspension of the 72 hour visa-free stay for persons arriving from China. In addition, he called for the creation of the Inter-Agency Commission on Coronavirus Non-Proliferation, chaired by Deputy PM Berdibek Saparbayev.

After the reported first case of COVID-19 in the country in March 2020, a state of emergency was declared as well as the formation of the State Commission for the State Emergency Regime in which Mamin became the head of. At the first meeting of the commission, Mamin instructed the government to strengthen measures by carrying out sanitary and anti-epidemic measures in all organizations and facilities and to provide pharmacy networks with medicines and personal protective equipment, while noting that äkims would take personal control of implementing measures.

On 17 April 2020, Mamin issued a governmental decree "On certain issues of entry (exit) in the Republic of Kazakhstan and the stay of immigrants in the Republic of Kazakhstan", which suspended certain laws that granted a 30-day visa-free stay for citizens from 57 countries.

On 21 April 2020, Mamin announced that the nationwide lockdowns would soften only with strict adherence to sanitary and epidemiological safety. As the coronavirus restrictions were lifted on 11 May 2020, an estimated 4.2 million Kazakhstanis had lost their jobs. To combat the issue, Mamin instructed the Ministry of Labour, National Economy and Agriculture, as well as with the akimats, to take measures in increasing employment in all state programs and ensure the implementation of all planned indicators with the Labour Ministry monitoring the work with the äkims.

On 19 June 2020, after an increase of cases shortly after the COVID-19 restrictions were lifted, Mamin addressed the difficulties of the epidemiological situation with the enforcement of new lockdowns by Tokayev. From there, Mamin directed the cabinet ministers and regional administrations to prepare a set of new effective methods to counter the resurgence of coronavirus cases. He also ordered to boost the domestic production of personal protective equipment.

At the government conference on 18 July 2020, it was declared that the situation in the country had been stabilized. Mamin ordered the cabinet officials to form in the Stabilization Fund the necessary stocks of medicines and medical products in each region to which he cited examples in Almaty, Nur-Sultan (now Astana) and Aqtöbe Region.

On 4 August 2020, with a decrease in COVID-19 cases, Mamin warned the government that the country must take steps to prevent the possible new wave of coronavirus infections that could occur in fall as he stated the increase of cases in 126 countries. He called for the continuation of intensive work in treating sick citizens and reduce the spread of the virus, as well as an awareness campaign on the need for citizens to comply with sanitary standards and quarantine requirements. At the State Commission meeting chaired by Mamin, it was decided on 13 August 2020 to phase out the lockdowns–imposed from 5 July 2020–starting from 17 August towards business but with limited capacity and 80% of employees were encouraged to maintain remote work format while the ban on mass events, entertainment facilities remained and the activities of cultural objects, museums, conferences, exhibitions and forums were prohibited. In September 2020, Mamin extended quarantine measures in fears of 2nd wave of infections by instructing the äkims to keep the epidemiological situation on the ground under special control, strictly comply with all sanitary standards, and respond promptly and accurately to changes in the rate of reproduction of the virus and morbidity with measures to prepare the infrastructure and ensure safety for workers. The Healthcare and Digital Development, Innovation and Aerospace Industry ministries were ordered to step up public awareness.

=== Foreign policy ===
In an official visit to Kyrgyzstan and Tajikistan on 11–12 July 2019, Mamin met with Kyrgyz President Sooronbay Jeenbekov where they both discussed issues on bilateral trade, economic and investment cooperation. At the VIII Meeting of the Kazakh-Kyrgyz Intergovernmental Council held in Bishkek, Mamin along with Kyrgyz PM Mukhammedkalyi Abylgaziev outlined joint plans that were aimed at deepening trade and economic cooperation between the two countries. As a result, a number of agreements were signed. In Dushanbe, Mamin with Tajik PM Kokhir Rasulzoda signed seven new cooperation agreements and discussed the commitment to the course of strategic partnership which would benefit both countries.

At the Eurasian Intergovernmental Council held on 17 July 2020 in Minsk, Mamin met with Russian PM Mikhail Mishustin where he thanked the Russian government for its assistance in a fight against COVID-19, telling that "we have received the competence of Russian doctors who have come, worked and work in different regions of Kazakhstan." He also expressed interest for Kazakhstan to be among the first countries in purchasing the Sputnik V vaccine.

On 6 November 2020, at the video conference between the heads of governments of Commonwealth of Independent States (CIS), Mamin proposed to create the National Commodity Conducting System in Kazakhstan as well as the formation trade-supply system within the CIS to ensure the smooth flow of agricultural products between the countries. A decision was adopted on the cross-border transportation of radioactive materials, information cooperation of CIS member states in the field of digital development of society, as well as decisions to strengthen cooperation in nuclear energy, agriculture, transport sector, engineering and other spheres.

== Personal life ==
Askar Mamin is married to Altynai Mamina. The couple has a son and daughter: Daniyar (born 1986) and Dinara (born 1991).

On 30 October 2020, the Internet Elite published a financial analysis on Mamin's brother, Marat, which showed him owning properties worth millions in Florida and Mamin's nephew, Yernar, operating businesses abroad in Western and Central Europe, as well as renting apartments in London.

== Notes ==
Political offices
Preceded by Bakhytzhan Sagintayev	Prime Minister of Kazakhstan; 2019–2022	Succeeded by Alihan Smaiylov
Preceded by Umirzak Shukeyev	Mayor of Astana; 2006–2008	Succeeded by Imangali Tasmagambetov
