= Kazakh Leading Academy of Architecture and Civil Engineering =

Kazakh Leading Academy of Architecture and Civil Engineering (Kazakh: Қазақ бас сәулет-құрылыс академиясы (ҚазБСҚА), romanized: Qazaq bas säulet-qūrylys akademiiasy (QazBSQA) is a top institution among the higher education institutions of the Republic of Kazakhstan in fields of Architecture, Design, Civil Engineering, Environmental Engineering, Economics and Management in Construction.

== Departments and colleges ==
- Department of Architecture
- Department of Design
- Department of Civil Engineering
- Department of Civil Engineering Technology, Infrastructure and Management
- Department of General Humanitarian Training
- Department of General Natural and Scientific Training
- College of Architecture
- College of Civil Engineering

== History ==
KazGASA was founded in 1980 as the "Almaty Architectural and Construction Institute" and renamed in 1992 to its current title. In 2007 it joined the Internation Education Corporation (IEC). In 2022 KazGASA was a participating institution in supporting Afghan scholarship recipients in receiving higher education through the EU. In 2025 KazGASA participated in a joint conference with the UK Department for Business and Trade pursuing an educational partnership with the University for the Creative Arts.

== UIA accreditation ==
The most important achievement and visible proof of international significance for the academy was accreditation of the study program of Architecture at KazGASA by UNESCO UIA Charter for Architectural Education. The certificate was awarded on 9 November 2007 and received by the academy in May 2008. It is the first higher education institution in the world accredited on "Architecture" major by UNIESCO UIA commission.
