= Shet District =

Coordinates: 47°48′36″N 73°12′36″E

Shet Шет
- District
- Шет ауданы
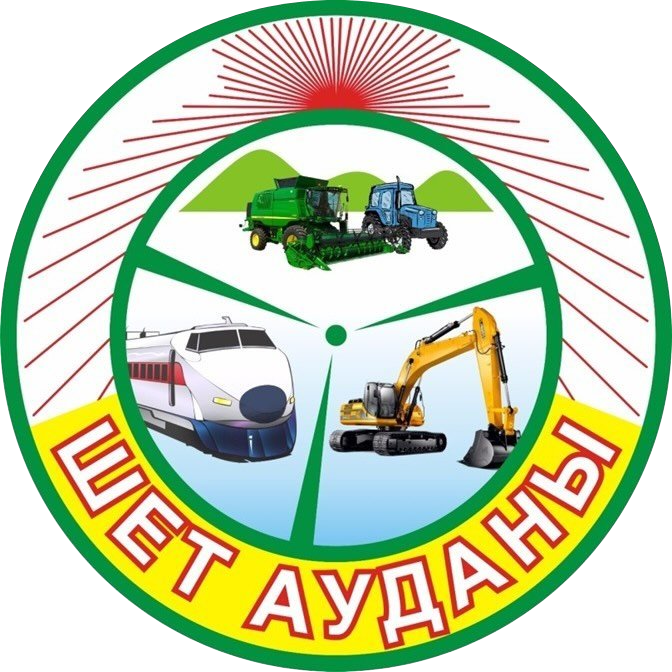
- Seal

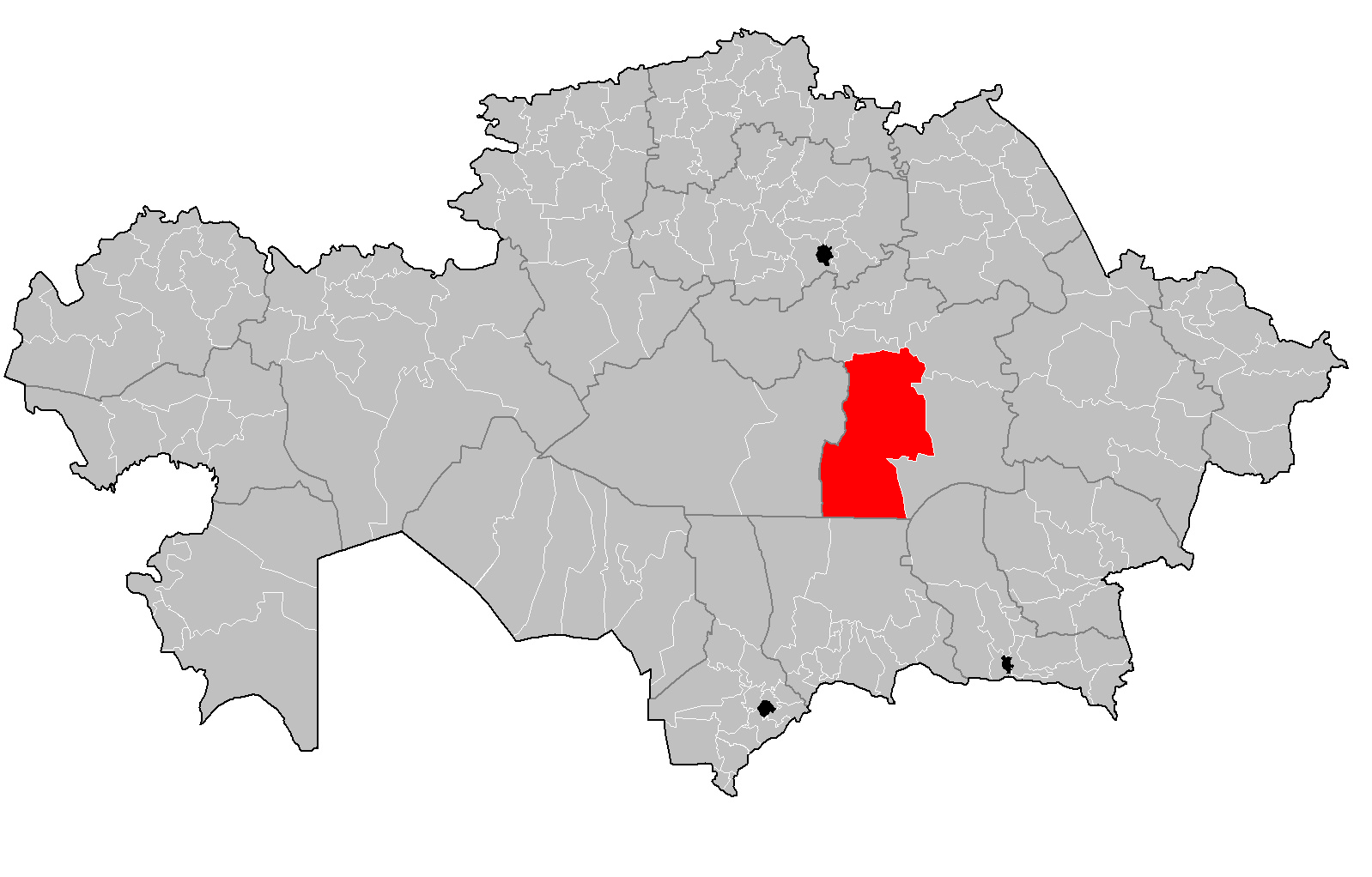
- Country: Kazakhstan
- Region: Karaganda Region
- Administrative center: Aksu-Ayuly
- Founded: 1928

Government
  - Akim: Mukhit Mukhtarov

Area
  - Total: 25,365 sq mi (65,694 km^{2})

Population (2013)
  - Total: 44,971
- Time zone: UTC+6 (East)

Shet District (Kazakh: Шет ауданы, Şet audany) is a district of Karaganda Region in central Kazakhstan. The administrative center of the district is the village of Aksu-Ayuly. Population: 44,971 (2013 estimate); 45,715 (2009 census results); 54,341 (1999 census results).

== Geography ==
The Akbastau river has its sources at the northern end of Shet District. The Bugyly range and lake Koktinkoli are also located in the district.
