= Hizb-an-Nusra =

Hizb-an-Nusra (English: Party of Support) is an Islamist organization which the Uzbek government considers to be terrorist in nature that has operated in Uzbekistan since 1999. It was founded by Mirzazhanov Atoyevich. Members of Hizb ut-Tahrir, an international organization dedicated to establishing a unified Islamic state across the Muslim world, created Hizb-an-Nusra in Tashkent out of dissatisfaction with Hizb ut-Tahrir's inability to overthrow the Government of Uzbekistan.

Akromiya, another Islamic Uzbek terrorist organization, broke away from HT in 1996. Akromiya leader Akrom Yo‘ldoshev's pamphlet Yimonga Yul (Way to Faith) criticizes HT's goal of creating an international caliphate for impracticality. Yudashev argues in favor of creating an Islamic state on a local level instead.

== See also ==
- Jama'at al-Jihad al-Islami
- Terrorism in Uzbekistan
- Terrorism in Kazakhstan
- Counter-terrorism in Kazakhstan
