= Gun law in Kazakhstan =

Kazakh law regulates the possession and use of firearms in the country, which categorizes firearms into three types, and specifies which entities or organizations are permitted to possess each type of firearm. Citizens of Kazakhstan, aged 21 or older, are legally allowed to acquire limited types of civilian weapons such as rifles (permitted for hunting) or long guns (for self-defense purposes), provided they obtain permission from their local internal affairs bodies.

== History ==
=== Kazakh Khanate (16th–19th centuries) ===
Firearms were first introduced to Kazakhstan reportedly in the mid-16th century, following the establishment of trade and diplomatic relations between the Kazakh Khanate and Tsardom of Russia. While the Kazakh nomads were already familiar with the concept of firearms, they lacked the technical knowledge and capability to produce them domestically. As a result, they acquired guns through trade export from the Russians. The Kazakh nobility which included khans, sultans, wealthy merchants, and soldiers from tribal militias, primarily possessed firearms, upon which were used in the Kazakh–Dzungar Wars.

Until the mid-19th century, the right to keep and bear arms was viewed as an obligation in the Kazakh Khanate, as described in Alexey Levshin's written work, Description of Kirghiz-Kaisak or Kirghiz-Cossack hordes and steppes (1832). Levshin provided a detailed account of the social and political structure of the Kazakh society at that time, including the Tauke Khan's Jeti Jarğy (Kazakh: Жеті жарғы, lit. 'Seven Charters'), which established the conditions for participation in tribal and jüz meetings by granting only armed Kazakhs the right to vote on issues of external and internal state affairs, as well as being obliged to pay a state tax amounting to one-twentieth of their wealth yearly to the khanate.

=== Russian conquest and the Alash militia (1830s–1920) ===
During the Russian conquest of Central Asia, Tsar Nicholas I of Russia issued a decree in May 1834 permanently exempting ethnic Kazakhs from conscription, as it was intended to ease anti-colonial sentiment within the Russian-controlled Kazakh steppe. Alikhan Bukeikhanov, leader of the Kazakh nationalist Alash party, attributed the loss of Kazakh mobility and military valor to the Tsar's decree, claiming that it caused a decline in the Kazakh national spirit and resulted in withdrawal from military service, which in turn led to disarmament. Bukeikhanov advocated for the voluntary military conscription of Kazakhs as a means to defend their ancestral territories and the right to self-government through armed populace resistance in "the near future".

In December 1917, the newly established Alash Autonomy under Bukeikhanov's leadership formed its national militia in the aftermath of the October Revolution, which led to the outbreak of the Russian Civil War across the territories of the former Russian Empire, as a means to protect the autonomy and territorial integrity. The Alash militia included rules for recruitment, training, uniforms, financing, and management, and was specifically established for the provision of firearms to recruits. However, the militia was ultimately disbanded with its members were disarmed by the Bolsheviks.

=== Soviet period (1922–1991) ===
Under the Soviet Union, gun control laws were enforced, which varied in their strictness across the different republics depending on their respective jurisdiction.

According to the Criminal Code of the Kazakh Soviet Socialist Republic adopted in 1959 (Article 202, amended in 1974 and 1982), it was illegal for Kazakhstanis to carry, store, acquire, manufacture, or sell firearms (except for smooth-bore hunting weapons), ammunition, or explosives without a legal permit. Violators would face up to five years of imprisonment, though those who voluntarily surrendered such items were exempt from criminal liability. The possession or sale of edged weapons, except for trade or service purposes, was punishable by up to one year of imprisonment, correctional labor for up to two years, or a fine of up to 100 Soviet rubles.

Following the dissolution of the Soviet Union, the regulation of firearms in the Criminal Code of the Kazakh SSR was abolished on 16 July 1997, which was then replaced with a new Criminal Code of the Republic of Kazakhstan specifying clearer definitions of punishments related to illegal gun usage.

=== Republic of Kazakhstan (since 1991) ===
On 30 December 1998, the Law No. 339 "On State Control of Turnover of Particular Types of Weapon" was adopted for the first time in the independent Kazakhstan. Throughout its existence, the law underwent a series of changes in relation to the regulation of firearms, with the amendments to the law from 29 December 2010 reducing the number of permitted civilian-owned weapons from five to two; imposing obligations for gun owners to report theft, loss, and unjustified or illegal use of firearms; and requiring gun owners to re-register their firearms when switching residential addresses.

In 2013, a law allowed for Kazakh police to use service weapons without a warning as well as ban and seizure of traumatic weapons from citizens. Due to public outcry, the law was amended partially which included changes such as prohibiting police officers from using deadly force without warning.

In the wake of the 2016 Aktobe shootings and the murder of Almaty police officers, gun shops were briefly closed down nationwide in Kazakhstan as a temporary measure with gun control laws being revised. Subsequently, a bill with the aim of countering terrorism was signed by President Nursultan Nazarbayev on 22 December 2016, which tightened restrictions on the circulation and storage of firearms, including a ban on rubber bullet pistols.

On 20 June 2019, the Ministry of Internal Affairs issued the Law No. 602 "On Approval of the Rules for the Circulation of Civil and Service Weapons and Ammunition" in regard to procedural guidelines for firearm owners, which included the purchasing of pneumatic weapons such as air guns only by a legal permit in addition. On 28 July 2021, a new strict rule was added which obliged for Kazakh citizens in acquiring civilian weapons by obtaining permission from the head of firearm manufacturer once every five years.

During the January Events of 2022, firearms were reportedly seized by Kazakh protesters from gun shops and government buildings in various regions, of which were most notably used in violent confrontations with the government forces in the streets of Almaty. According to the Kazakh authorities, approximately over 2,960 firearms and nearly 63,000 ammunitions were stolen during the civil unrest, which led to a mass search effort in retrieving the missing weapons. As a result, this led to public debate on gun issues regarding the efficiency of self-defense rights, as well calls for stricter gun control by the Kazakh parliamentarians. On 11 July 2022, the bill "On the introduction of amendments and additions to some legislative acts of the Republic of Kazakhstan on issues of strengthening responsibility for certain criminal offenses and arms trafficking" was signed into law by President Kassym-Jomart Tokayev, which introduced new gun restrictions in raising the age limit for obtaining hunting rifles from 18 to 21; compulsory physiological test screening for gun owners and sellers; cancellation procedure of weapon permit; requirement of storing weapons in a non-functioning condition; criminals convicted of serious crimes permanently banned from owning weapons for life.

== Provision of the law ==
Firearms in Kazakhstan are regulated by the Law "On State Control of Turnover of Particular Types of Weapons", which governs the use and trade of guns in order to protect citizens, property, and the environment, and to prevent crimes and the illegal distribution of weapons.

=== Weapon categories ===
In Kazakhstan, guns are classified into three categories based on their intended purposes which include:

1. Military handheld small arms and cold weapons
  - Include weapons intended for carrying out combat, operational, and training tasks. These weapons are officially accepted for service by relevant Kazakh state bodies, including the Armed Forces, other troops and military formations, special state and law enforcement bodies. They may also be manufactured for export supplies.
2. Nonmilitary weapons (civilian weapons)
  - Used by citizens of Kazakhstan for various purposes such as collecting, exhibiting, self-defense, sport, hunting, as well as by educational and cultural organizations for educational and cultural purposes. Civilian firearms must not be capable of firing in bursts, with the exception of hollowed weapons.
3. Service weapons
  - Used by authorised individuals and organisations to ensure personal safety and security. This includes government officials, such as state workers and deputies of the Parliament of Kazakhstan, as well as organisations responsible for protecting citizens, property, environment, natural resources, valuable and hazardous cargos, and special correspondence. The possession of service weapons is regulated by relevant legislation and provisions applicable to these entities.

=== Background eligibility ===
To acquire civilian weapons, a person must be a Kazakh citizen and at least 18 years old, with the exception of smoothbore long-barreled firearms and rifles intended for self-defense and hunting purposes, respectively. The acquisition of long guns and rifles with a hunting license is reserved for citizens who are at least 21 years old. This process is conducted their local internal affairs bodies after obtaining permission, which issue permits for the legal acquisition of civilian firearms, gas pistols, revolvers, and electric weapons.

=== Legal consequences ===
In accordance with Article 484 of the Code No. 235-V "On Administrative Infractions", the violation of regulations regarding the possession and use of civilian and service weapons in Kazakhstan may typically result in fines and potential license or permit suspension or revocation. For individuals, fines can range from 10 to 20 times the monthly calculation indices, while for legal entities, fines can range from 50 to 80 times the monthly calculation indices. These violations pertain to activities such as illegal production, sale, transfer, storage, transportation, and use of weapons, including their components and ammunition.

Article 485 of the Code "On Administrative Infractions" clarifies the illegal use of weapons, which if it does not constitute a criminal offense can result in a fine of 20 times the monthly settlement indicators. Along with the fine, the permission to store, keep, and carry weapons will be suspended. If the same violation is committed again within a year after an administrative sanction has been imposed, a fine of 40 times the monthly calculation indices will be imposed. In addition to the fine, the weapons will be confiscated, and the permission to store, keep, and carry weapons will be revoked.

== See also ==
- Estimated number of civilian guns per capita by country
- Gun control
- List of countries by firearm-related death rate
- Overview of gun laws by nation
