= 2016 shooting of Almaty police officers =

Mass murder in Almaty, Kazakhstan

- Location: 43.2490336°N 76.8716763°E; Almaty, Kazakhstan
- Date: 18 July 2016; 10:54 a.m. – 11:18 a.m. (UTC+6)
- Target: Police officers
- Attack type: Mass shooting, shootout, carjacking, terrorist attack
- Weapons: AKS-74U; MCM pistol
- Deaths: 11 (including one attacker)
- Injuries: At least 10 (including one attacker)
- Perpetrators: Ruslan Kulikbayev and six accomplices
- Motive: Suspected Salafi jihadism, Anti-police sentiment
- Verdict: Ruslan Kulikbayev: Death; commuted to life imprisonment
- Convictions: Murder; Attempted murder Terrorism

On 18 July 2016, Ruslan Kulikbayev, a 26-year-old Salafi jihadist and ex-convict, shot and killed 10 people—8 police officers and 2 civilians—in the city of Almaty, Kazakhstan before being apprehended in a chase and shootout with law enforcement. In addition to Kulikbayev, police arrested five other suspects involved in the attack, while officers shot and killed a sixth suspect. While in custody, Kulikbayev confessed to the attack, claiming he perpetrated it due to a hatred of law enforcement.

In November 2016, Kulikbayev was convicted on terrorism and murder charges stemming from the attack, and was sentenced to death. At the time of Kazakhstan's abolition of the death penalty in 2021, he had been the only person on Kazakhstan's death row and his death sentence was subsequently commuted to life imprisonment. Kulikbayev's five accomplices were also convicted and sentenced to prison terms ranging from 3 to 10.5 years.

== Background ==
The attack came just over a month after the spate of 2016 Aktobe shootings against civilian and military targets where 25 people were killed.

== Prelude to the shootings ==
At 3:52 a.m. local time Ruslan Kulikbayev, armed with a handgun, committed his first murder by shooting an alleged Uzbek prostitute in a taxicab. He then forced the taxi driver to drive him to Almaty.

== Shootings ==
Kulikbayev originally intended to begin his attack at an Almaty courthouse, but changed his mind upon seeing the large number of civilians there, and instead forced the taxi driver to bring him to an Almaty police station. Near the station, Kulikbayev released the taxi driver unharmed and walked the remaining distance to his target. The taxi driver was later apprehended by authorities after the shootings in Almaty, but police released the driver after they determined he was not an accomplice of Kulikbayev.

At around 11:00 a.m. local time, Kulikbayev, armed with an MCM semi-automatic handgun, shot and killed a policeman outside of the Almaty police station and stole his weapon, an automatic AKS-74U assault rifle. Kulikbayev then began firing the assault rifle indiscriminately at nearby police officers and civilians. After shooting several people, Kulikbayev carjacked a vehicle, shooting and killing its driver. A female driver recorded the shooting on a dashboard camera, but Kulikbayev did not shoot her. Using the stolen car, Kulikbayev drove to a nearby Kazakh government building housing offices of the National Security Committee (NSC), where he shot and wounded another policeman and an NSC official. The wounded NSC official later died from his wounds in the hospital, although the injured police officer survived. After shooting the two officers, Kulikbayev hijacked a second car, but was spotted and chased by responding police vehicles as he tried to flee. After a high-speed chase, police eventually cornered Kulikbayev, where he engaged the officers in a violent gunfight. During the shootout, several more policemen were wounded, and three officers would later die from their injuries in the hospital. Kulikbayev finally surrendered to authorities after being shot five times. Kulikbayev was taken to a nearby hospital where he was treated for gunshot wounds. While in the hospital, he was interrogated by investigators and confessed to the Almaty attacks and the previous murder of the Uzbek prostitute. During his interrogation, Kulikbayev claimed he had only intended to kill police in the shootings, and not civilians.

Owing to conflicting reports regarding the number of casualties and confusion over the number, location, and identities of the suspects, police were "sluggish" in responding to the incident. Almaty was placed on lockdown after the attack and tactical units, anti-terrorist units and soldiers patrolled the area for several hours, searching for suspects.

In addition to the shootings committed by Kulikbayev, at least two other individuals linked to Kulikbayev carried out separate attacks in and around Almaty on the same day. One of the attackers was killed in a shootout with police, while the other was arrested. In the days following the Almaty shootings, Kazakh police arrested and charged four more individuals with suspected connections to the attack.

=== Victims ===
In total, the attacks in Almaty killed at least 10 people and wounded over a dozen others. The dead included an Uzbek prostitute killed by Kulikbayev the night before the attack, four police officers and one civilian killed during the attack, and three injured policemen who later died from their wounds in the hospital.

Four of the police officers killed by Kulikbayev were identified as:

- Captain Bauyrzhan Nurmakhanbetov, 28, who had been serving in the Department of Internal Affairs since 22 December 2011.
- Junior Sergeant Maksat Salimbaev, 24, who had been serving in the Department of Internal Affairs since 15 November 2013.
- Starshina Ayan Galiev, 42, who had been serving in the Department of Internal Affairs since 30 January 1997.
- Lieutenant Timur Begasilov, 29, who had been serving in the Department of Internal Affairs since January 2015. Died of wounds in hospital the next day.

=== Perpetrator ===
Ruslan Kulikbayev
- Born: 11 June 1990 (age 36); Baikonur, Kazakh SSR, Soviet Union
- Citizenship: Kazakhstan
- Known for: Perpetrator of the 2016 shooting of Almaty police officers
- Spouse: Aiaulym Ümbetqūlova (m. 2010)
- Children: 2
- Status: Incarcerated
- Criminal charges: Murder, attempted murder, terrorism
- Penalty: Death (commuted to life imprisonment in 2021)

Details
- Imprisoned at: Black Berkut Prison, Kostanay Region, Kazakhstan

Ruslan Alpysbaiūly Külıkbaev (Note: In this name that follows East Slavic naming customs, the patronymic is Alpysbaiūly and the family name is Külıkbaev.) (Kazakh: Руслан Алпысбайұлы Күлікбаев) was the main perpetrator and mastermind of the attack. He was convicted with terrorism and murder in November 2016, and sentenced to death. When Kazakhstan abolished the death penalty in 2021, his death sentence was commuted to life imprisonment. He was the only person in Kazakhstan on death row.

Kulikbayev was born on 11 June 1990 in Baikonur and raised there. His parents had divorced when he was still a minor. He attended Yuri Gagarin Comprehensive Secondary School No. 8, leaving after the 9th grade with an incomplete secondary school certificate. In school, he was reportedly introverted and prone to violence under the influence of alcohol.

Kulikbayev had been convicted twice previously. The first led to a 3-year suspended imprisonment for robbery with violence imposed on him by the Enbekshi District Court of Shymkent on 27 August 2010. It was determined that he ambushed a jewelry saleswoman near her home in July 2010, beating her and taking away her purse with 115,000 tenge (≈US$5,500) and a mobile phone. The second time the police seized a Nagant M1895 with ammunition and a suppressor from him, presumably found by Kulikbayev near a local railway station in Taraz on 14 February 2012, that led to his 3-year and 6-month prison sentence for illegal acquisition and possession of firearms enhanced by recidivism by the Kyzylorda Municipal Court on 8 May 2012. In prison, 14 penalties were imposed on him for disobedience and violation of orders and instructions provided by detention personnel. According to security officials, he maintained close relations with Salafists while being incarcerated.

His marriage to Aiaulym Ümbetqūlova, a native of Yntymak, Ile District began in 2010 and produced a son and a daughter. By the words of his wife, he turned from an exemplary family man to a deeply religious person after the release, and wanted her to wear a hijab, but she refused.

Before the attack, he resided in Yntymaq, and worked odd jobs for a living, such as selling mobile phones.

== Response ==
- Chechnya: Head of the Chechen Republic, a federal subject of Russia, Ramzan Kadyrov offered on his Instagram page condolences to the people of Kazakhstan and President Nursultan Nazarbayev, and confirmed Chechnya's readiness to closely cooperate with Kazakhstan in fighting terrorism.
- Iran: Iran's Foreign Ministry Spokesman Bahram Ghasemi strongly condemned the attack, and stated "Terror and violence in any form and anywhere are condemned and unacceptable".

== Investigation ==
Kulikbayev had originally planned to kill judges and prosecutors at the Almaty District Court to get revenge on law enforcement structures for his previous imprisonment, as reported by Minister of Internal Affairs Kalmukhanbet Kassymov.

== Trial and sentencing ==
Kulikbayev, along with five other individuals, were charged by a Kazakh court in Almaty with numerous crimes including murder, attempted murder, and terrorism stemming from the attack.

In an extremely rare move, the government prosecutors announced that they were seeking the death penalty for Kulikbayev. Although Kazakhstan officially abolished the death penalty for civil crimes in 2007, it still allowed capital punishment for crimes committed under "exceptional circumstances", such as war crimes or (as Kulikbayev was charged with) acts of terrorism. No executions had been carried out in Kazakhstan since 2003 due to a moratorium, but the penalty could still be imposed on certain criminals.

During the trial proceedings, Kulikbayev was reportedly very belligerent and uncooperative, at one point allegedly flipping over and "tossing" a table at an investigator despite being handcuffed.

On 2 November 2016, the Kazakh court found all six defendants guilty of their involvement in the Almaty attack. In addition to murder, and attempted murder, Kulikbayev was convicted with terrorism (then a capital offense) and sentenced to death, becoming the first person in Kazakhstan to receive such a sentence in nearly ten years. Kulikbayev had been awaiting execution in Black Berkut Prison in Kostanay Region. He was the only person in Kazakhstan under a sentence of death. Kulikbayev's lawyer stated that there were no plans to appeal the verdict. Kazakh PM Mäulen Äşimbaev stated after the verdict that, although he considered Kulikbayev's sentence "fair", he did not believe that he would ever be executed, as Kazakhstan had instituted a moratorium on the death penalty since 2003.

Kulikbayev has attempted suicide at least twice while incarcerated.

Following the ratification of the Second Optional Protocol to the International Covenant on Civil and Political Rights by the Parliament of Kazakhstan on 29 December 2020, the death penalty was abolished in Kazakhstan. Kulikbayev's death sentence was commuted, and he will instead serve a life sentence in prison.

The attorneys for the other five defendants tried to argue that their clients had little or no involvement in the attacks, but the argument was rejected and the five defendants were convicted and sentenced to prison terms ranging from 3 to 10.5 years.

== See also ==
- 2011 Aktobe bombing
- Terrorism and counterterrorism in Kazakhstan
