= List of organizations designated as terrorist by Kazakhstan =

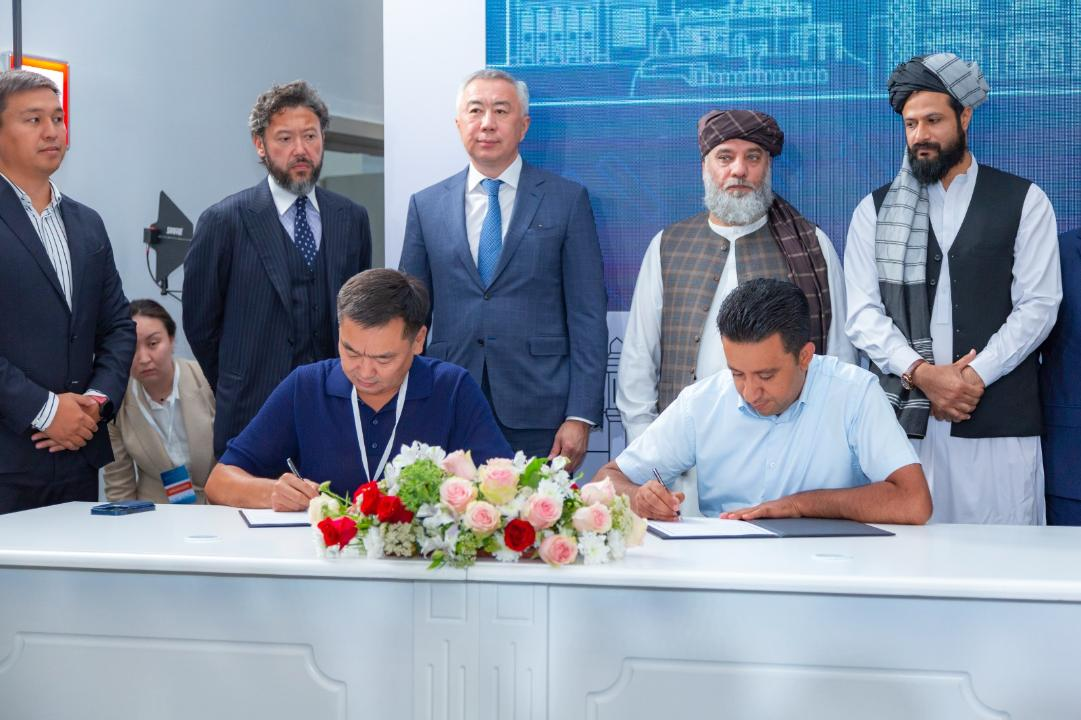
Representatives of Kazakhstan and the now Taliban-led Afghanistan sign documents during a controversial business forum, August 2023. A year later, the Taliban was removed from Kazakhstan's list of terrorist organizations.

Organizations designated as terrorist by Kazakhstan are groups that have been listed by the Kazakh government as terrorist organisations. The Government publishes a consolidated list of banned terrorist organizations, along with the judicial decision that led to their listing.

== Currently listed ==
As of 19 December 2023, listed entities are:

1. Al-Qaeda (15 October 2004)
2. East Turkistan Islamic Movement (15 October 2004)
3. Islamic Movement of Uzbekistan (15 October 2004)
4. Kurdistan People's Congress (15 October 2004)
5. Asbat al-Ansar (15 March 2005)
6. Muslim Brotherhood (15 March 2005)
7. Grey Wolves (15 March 2005)
8. Jamaat mujahideen of Central Asia (15 March 2005)
9. Lashkar-e-Toiba (15 March 2005)
10. The Social Reform Society (15 March 2005)
11. Hizb ut-Tahrir-al-Islami (28 March 2005)
12. Aum Shinrikyo (17 November 2006)
13. East Turkestan Liberation Organization (17 November 2006)
14. Islamic Party of Turkestan (5 March 2008)
15. Jund al-Khilafah (25 November 2011)
16. Trust. Education. Life (7 June 2012)
17. Tablighi-Jamagat (26 February 2013)
18. At-Takfir Wal-Hijra (18 August 2014)
19. Islamic State (15 October 2015)
20. Al-Nusra Front (15 October 2015)
21. Aikyn incar (10 October 2018)

== Formerly listed ==
The Taliban movement, originally added on 15 March 2005, was removed in 2023.

== See also ==
- Terrorism in Kazakhstan
- List of designated terrorist groups
