= Olimp case =

2019 criminal case in Kazakhstan

The Olimp case is a criminal case initiated in 2019 by the National Security Committee of Kazakhstan against the bookmaker companies OLIMP KZ, Alpha-bet and Onlybet on charges of illegal gambling, tax evasion, property legalization and participation in a criminal group.

The case arose two weeks after the all-Kazakhstan press conference held by Olimp as the leader of the Association of Bookmakers of Kazakhstan, during which Olimp publicly accused the officials of the relevant ministry of creating (for the benefit of their own business interests) a private monopoly—a single betting operator named "Betting Accounting Center".

Following Olimp, criminal cases were also brought against other bookmakers in Kazakhstan: Profit Betting, StavkaBet, and PariMatch.kz, Finbet, Triumph, and Favorit have faced criminal proceedings since 2020.

After Olimp's liquidation through criminal cases, the private monopoly "Betting Accounting Center", against whose creation Olimp had fought for about two years, was legalized in just a few months. In 2021, Saken Mussaibekov, Vice Minister of Tourism and Sports of Kazakhstan, was held criminally liable for a bribe from the "Betting Accounting Center".

The charges brought against Olimp were refuted by the experts' opinions of (including PricewaterhouseCoopers), the Business Ombudsman of Kazakhstan, the results of non-public investigative actions, testimony of numerous witnesses and other case materials. The imputed taxes were additionally assessed on activities recognized as illegal gambling, while taxation of illegal activities is inadmissible.

Nevertheless, as a result of the Olimp case, company employees (including women who had minor children or even infants) were sentenced to various prison terms.

Without waiting for a trial, all property belonging to the alleged persons in the case was confiscated and turned over to the state, which meant that they were found guilty of all charges, in violation of the presumption of innocence.

In March 2024, relatives of those convicted made an open video appeal to the President of Kazakhstan Kasym-Jomart Tokayev with a request to review the Olimp case, which appeared in the times of "Old Kazakhstan", and to instruct law enforcers to stop ignoring the violations committed.

== Background of criminal prosecution ==
Olimp had been operating in Kazakhstan since 2007 and was the largest bookmaker company in the country. In the summer of 2018, Kazakhstan's Ministry of Tourism and Sports, led by now-convicted Arystanbek Mukhamediuly and Saken Mussaibekov, decided to create a monopoly betting operator in Kazakhstan. The Government of Kazakhstan, the Ministry of National Economy, and other organizations did not approve such an initiative but lobbying to create a monopoly betting operator continued.

In 2019, a new amendment to the Law "On Gambling Business" was initiated, providing for the creation of a monopoly betting operator called "Betting Accounting Center"—a private organization with a private owner. The amendment stipulated that bookmakers' offices in Kazakhstan were obliged to conduct all their betting through a server of the private monopolist "Betting Accounting Center", which, in turn, was granted the right to charge bookmakers a commission at its discretion. Accordingly, the private owner of the "Betting Accounting Center" was to become an instant billionaire. According to mass media calculations, the private monopoly "Betting Accounting Center" was to earn between ₸20,000,000,000 and ₸25,000,000,000 (20–25 billion Kazakhstani tenge) per year by receiving 4% commission for each bet in the country.

In October 2019, Olimp and other Kazakhstan bookmakers from the Association of Bookmakers of Kazakhstan held a Kazakhstan-wide press conference where they publicly made accusations that the "Betting Accounting Center" was being created to serve someone else's business interests.

Two weeks after the press conference, a criminal case was brought against Olimp, after which the special operations forces of the National Security Committee of Kazakhstan (NSC), then headed by the now-convicted Karim Massimov and Daulet Yergozhin, stormed Olimp's office. The NSC did everything to stop Olimp's operation immediately: it ripped out the server, paralyzed the office, put the usual employees face down on the floor, seized bank accounts, and finally suspended the bookmaker's license.

After the liquidation of Olimp through criminal cases, the officials' plans were quickly implemented - the private monopoly "Betting Accounting Center", against the creation of which Olimp fought for about two years, was legalized in just a few months.

== Alleged offences ==
=== Illegal gambling business ===
The grounds for the appearance of NSC special operations forces in Olimp's office were a criminal case of illegal gambling under Article 307 of the Criminal Code of Kazakhstan, initiated by the regional office of the NSC in Almaty, which at that time was headed by the now convicted Nurlan Mazhilov.

The criminal case was initiated immediately on the qualifying features of especially large size as part of a criminal group (part 3, subparagraphs 1,2, Article 307 of the Criminal Code of Kazakhstan), while on the day of initiation of the criminal case, there was no evidence of both especially large damage and a criminal group.

In addition, the initiation of this criminal case by the National Security Committee violated the rules of jurisdiction in Kazakh law: cases of illegal gambling fall within the competence of economic investigation authorities, not the NSC, and the consent of the prosecutor's office for the NSC to pursue the case was obtained only after the case had been initiated.

The NSC classified the BetGames products, which legally operated in many countries worldwide, as illegal gambling and called them "online casinos" during the investigation; in fact, they were live broadcasts of gambling events conducted by the Zaidimai company in Europe and did not belong to online casinos.

Olimp, like other bookmakers in Kazakhstan, had openly been working with Betgames for many years. The acceptance of bets on the results of Betgames events was no different from that on the results of world sporting events, and took place publicly through tax-registered cash desks and Olimp's website on the Internet. Over the many years of use, Betgames had never received any complaints about the product.

However, the NSC suddenly labeled this activity as online casino and outlawed it.

=== Tax evasion ===
In a criminal case involving illegal gambling, the NSC additionally ordered a tax audit. In the acts on the tax audit results, Nurlan Kozhageldiyev, a tax inspector of the Almaty Internal Revenue Department, indicated that Olimp was engaged in illegal gambling business in the form of BetGames online casino, and then additionally charged over 90 billion tenge of "gambling tax" and "individual income tax at source" (income tax of Olimp's clients, for whom Olimp was required to remit this tax to the budget) for these illegal activities.

At the same time, according to the opinion of the same tax inspector, Nurlan Kozhageldiyev, the illegal gambling business is not subject to taxation. Nevertheless, this did not stop him from imposing additional taxes.

Nevertheless, tax inspector Nurlan Kozhageldiyev excluded from the tax audit all of Olimp's accounting documents for a 5-year period that confirmed cash payments to customers made at Olimp's cash offices operating in all regions of Kazakhstan.

Olimp's primary accounting documents seized during the search, which tax inspector Nurlan Kozhageldiyev personally participated in seizing, were also not taken into account during the audit and were returned as "No investigative interest".

These actions of the tax inspector led to the fact that according to the acts of tax audit the amount of cash paid to clients for 5 years amounted to 0 tenge.

The exclusion of cash paid to clients, which was the company's expense, increased Olimp's revenue share to 80% of turnover, whereas, according to Dentons' international research, bookmaker offices in Kazakhstan earn 5-15% of turnover.

All cash that Olimp delivered from Almaty over a 5-year period to its more than 300 cash offices in all regions of Kazakhstan, which was then paid out to Olimp's clients, was referred to by the NSC as "cash taken abroad", in complete disregard of the numerous identical testimonies of different Olimp's employees among the regional cashiers.

As a result, the NSC initiated a new criminal case against Olimp for tax evasion under Article 245 of the Criminal Code of Kazakhstan.

PricewaterhouseCoopers, the Business Ombudsman of Kazakhstan, as well as leading Kazakhstan tax experts 4142 confirmed the illegality of both the additional taxes and accusations of non-payment of taxes. In the opinions of these persons, the fact of unjustified additional taxation of BetGames activity, declared as illegal gambling business, was fixed, in connection with which the charges in non-payment of taxes under Article 245 of the Criminal Code of Kazakhstan were marked as overly imputed. The additional taxation of the illegal gambling business is equivalent, for example, to the taxation of the activity of selling drugs.

== License suspension ==
The NSC also initiated additional proceedings to suspend Olimp's license because Olimp lacked a server in Kazakhstan. The investigation recognized the server in Olimp's office as not real.

On November 29, 2019, the Specialized Interdistrict Administrative Court of Almaty issued a ruling to suspend Olimp's license.

The investigation and the court ignored both the fact that the server had been fiscalized in accordance with Kazakh legislation and that the control rate for this server had actually been received. In addition, the same server had already been checked in 2016 by an IT specialist engaged by the tax authority, who confirmed its authenticity, its existence in Kazakhstan and the relevance of the data it contained.

Although the administrative court's decision was subject to appeal to the appellate instance and had not yet entered into legal force, the judge, on the day of its issuance, marked it as having entered into force. With the help of complaints against the judge's actions, Olimp's advocates managed to get the illegal marking of the entry into force removed.

In 2021, during the trial of the defendants in the Olimp case, the forgery of the opinion stating that Olimp did not have a server in Kazakhstan was revealed: two versions of the opinion with different content were found. The court ignored this fact.

== Procedural history ==
=== First instance ===
The trial of the defendants in the Olimp's case began in 2021, during which Nurlan Kozhageldiyev, a tax inspector of the Almaty State Revenue Department, confirmed that he had failed to separate the turnovers of BetGames products recognized as illegal gambling from the total turnover of Olimp and made an additional charge of over 90 billion tenge in taxes on BetGames' activities.

When asked by the defense about the reasons for failure to separate the turnover of BetGames, the tax inspector Nurlan Kozhageldiyev replied that the turnover of BetGames allegedly did not affect the calculation of taxes, which forced the defense to declare a contradiction by reading the opinion of the same tax inspector on the inadmissibility of taxation of illegal gambling business.

The court ignored this contradiction.

During the court hearing, tax inspector Nurlan Kozhageldiyev also confirmed that he had the primary accounting documentation for Olimp in his office regarding winnings paid in cash at cash desks in the regions. But he did not examine this documentation, and those primary accounting documents seized during the search in Olimp's office, in the seizure of which tax inspector Nurlan Kozhageldiyev personally participated.

During the trial, the forgery of an opinion regarding the absence of Olimp's server in Kazakhstan was also revealed - two versions of the opinion with different content were found. The court ignored this fact.

During the trial, many different witnesses – Olimp's employees, including cashiers from the regional cash offices - gave identical testimony. All of these witnesses testified that the regional cash offices regularly paid cash to Olimp's clients as betting winnings. And the cash for payments to clients was delivered to the cash offices from Olimp's head office in Almaty.

On June 28, 2021, the Almaly District Court of Almaty sentenced the defendants to various prison terms ranging from 5.5 to 8.5 years with confiscation of property. The prison sentences were imposed on women who had minor children, including infants.

The court found all defendants guilty of taking cash out of Kazakhstan, holding them liable for "taking" cash on hand "from Almaty to Nur-Sultan", even though these actions were not illegal.

The court also found all defendants to have been members of the criminal group since January 2014, although many defendants began their employment with Olimp after 2016.

In addition, under the civil lawsuit, each of the convicted persons recovered, jointly and severally, additional taxes of more than 90 billion tenge from Olimp.

=== Disregard by the court of precedent in a similar criminal case ===
In the judicial practice of Kazakhstan, there was a precedent in an absolutely similar criminal case - the verdict of the Almaly District Court of Almaty dated August 11, 2020, against the director of PariMatch.KZ.

The PariMatch.KZ case and the Olimp case started almost simultaneously and were initiated on the fact that the same BetGames product was used. However, despite the identical start of both cases, they were investigated and concluded very differently.

PariMatch.KZ was not charged with non-payment of taxes and participation in a criminal group after the initiation of a case on illegal gambling.

At the same time, in the Olimp's case, the activities of BetGames, suddenly declared as illegal gambling business, were taxed and Olimp was wrongfully charged simultaneously under mutually exclusive Articles 245 and 307 of the Criminal Code of Kazakhstan, although the case of Olimp was no different from the case of PariMatch.KZ.

While in the case of PariMatch.KZ the convicted person was sentenced to a monetary fine and the employees of PariMatch.KZ (who were no different from the Olimp's employees) were not declared participants of the criminal group. In the Olimp's case, the convicted persons received severe sentences of 5.5 to 8.5 years' imprisonment, with confiscation of property and a civil claim of over 90 billion tenge, jointly and severally, without the right to early parole or commutation.

=== Review ===
In summer 2023, relatives of those convicted in the Olimp case united to seek a review of the criminal case and its consideration in accordance with the law. They filed a collective petition with the General Prosecutor's Office of Kazakhstan.

On September 13, 2023, the General Prosecutor's Office of Kazakhstan saw the existence of grounds for reviewing the criminal case of Olimp on newly discovered circumstances, in connection with which it instructed the Almaty Prosecutor's Office to conduct a corresponding examination.

In turn, the Almaty Prosecutor's Office delegated the examination to the Almaty Department of the National Security Committee, i.e., the decision on the review of the Olimp case was given to the body whose actions the families of the convicts appealed.

In February 2024, the NSC sent a material to the Almaty Prosecutor's Office stating that there were no newly discovered circumstances warranting a review of Olimp's case, thereby directly contradicting the General Prosecutor's Office's decision that such circumstances existed.

On February 27, 2024, the Prosecutor's Office of Almaty returned the materials to the Department of the NSC in Almaty for additional verification, stating that "the examination was completed without taking into account all the circumstances, in particular, no investigative action was carried out".

On March 19, 2024, the Almaty Prosecutor's Office issued an instruction to the Almaty Department of the NSC to interrogate several specialists.

On March 25, 2024, relatives of those convicted in the Olimp's case appealed with an open video message to the President of Kazakhstan, Kasym-Jomart Tokayev, with a request to instruct law enforcement officials to stop ignoring the violations committed in the case and to reconsider the criminal case.

The video message of the relatives also contained a 5-minute investigation, with information about the signs of an ordered nature of the case on the part of the Old Kazakhstan officials because of the struggle of Olimp with the creation of a private monopoly - a single betting operator "Betting Accounting Center".

On April 19, 2024, a meeting was held at the Almaty Prosecutor's Office as part of the reexamination of Olimp's case with the participation of a representative of the General Prosecutor's Office of Kazakhstan, the Almaty Prosecutor's Office, and the Almaty Department of the NSC.

Nurlan Kozhageldiyev, a tax inspector at the Almaty Internal Revenue Department, who also levied more than 90 billion tenge in taxes, was present at the meeting and said that there was no provision in the Tax Code stating that illegal gambling businesses cannot be taxed. At the same time, the case file contained the opinion of the same tax inspector, Nurlan Kozhageldiyev, who directly asserted that the illegal gambling business is not taxable.

In this regard, relatives of those convicted in the Olimp's case appealed to the General Prosecutor's Office of Kazakhstan to take action on the fact of misleading the representative of the General Prosecutor's Office.

On May 3, 2024, the NSC sent a repeated material to the Almaty Prosecutor's Office regarding the absence of newly discovered circumstances to review the Olimp's case. The experts who were directly ordered by the Almaty Prosecutor's Office to be questioned were not questioned.

Currently, all materials of the Olimp case have been requested by the General Prosecutor's Office of Kazakhstan.

In May 2024, a group of relatives of those convicted in the Olimp case submitted a collective petition to the General Prosecutor's Office of Kazakhstan, requesting that it file a cassation appeal with the Supreme Court of Kazakhstan to review the case.

== Death of Zhanibek Zhauyrov ==
The controversial criminal prosecution of Olimp Betting Company, which began in 2019, turned into a deadly tragedy.1 Seriously ill Zhanibek Zhauyrov, one of the defendants of the "Olimp Case", died in custody after the court unlawfully refused to release him for serious health reasons. This has raised new questions about the legality of the entire case, as well as the work of the law enforcement and the impartiality of the judicial system of Kazakhstan.

Arrest on the Olimp case

Zhanibek Zhauyrov, who had suffered from liver disease since 2013, ended up in prison as part of a large-scale criminal case against the Olimp company. This case, known as the "Olimp Case", raised many questions among human rights activists and experts due to possible political background and gross violations during the investigation. In particular, Olimp was charged over 90 billion tenge of taxes on its online gaming BetGames product, which overnight was declared an "illegal gambling business. Interestingly enough, in Kazakhstan, illegal activities are not subject to taxation.

Before his arrest, Zhauyrov had been diagnosed with and living with liver cirrhosis for more than 10 years. Despite this, he was sent to prison, which subsequently led to a sharp deterioration in his health.

Health condition and refusal to release

By the beginning of 2024, amid the ongoing proceedings on the Olimp case, Zhauyrov's health had deteriorated significantly. He was recognized as a person with a disability of the 1st category. By the summer of 2024, Zhanibek Zhauyrov's liver cirrhosis had reached its terminal stage. In addition to cirrhosis, Zhanibek Zhauyrov's esophagus was eroded to such an extent that part of it was replaced with a plastic tube. Zhanibek Zhauyrov's condition was assessed as critical.

On July 7, 2024, a special medical commission diagnosed him with the following diseases: "Code MKB-10.K 74. Liver cirrhosis class C (11 points), MELD - 17 points, in the outcome of hepatitis C with mild biochemical activity. Hepatic cell failure, decompensation, secondary coagulopathy. Hepatic encephalopathy type C, continuously progressive course". According to Kazakhstani law, this diagnosis undeniably forms the basis for releasing an inmate from serving or completing their sentence. Liver cirrhosis, in particular, is included in the list of diseases that render the inmate ineligible for release under the Minister of Health's Order of June 30, 2022.

On July 17, 2024, despite Zhauyrov's serious condition and the medical commission's recommendations, the judge of the city of Konaev, Maksat Amirkulov, refused to release him. Given the underlying circumstances of the case, many people associated this decision with its political nature. To keep Zhanibek from being released, Judge Amirkulov entered another convict's name into Zhanibek's final decree and indicated a different diagnosis. In addition, Judge Maksat Amirkulov also indicated that Zhauyrov was aggressive and his illness was dangerous to others. However, there was no such information in the Special Medical Commission's conclusion.

The judge completely ignored the opinions of the members of the Special Medical Commission who presented at the trial, failed to assess them, and failed to act upon their recommendations.

Cirrhosis is an irreversible process. No one can treat class C of the third stage; an organ transplant is needed. The patient was examined by a transplantologist and put on a waiting list. We do not have a donor in our country, perhaps abroad, for example, in Belarus.

— Balzhan Abzhaparova, Hepatologist-gastroenterologist of the scientific center, Time.kz

Throughout Zhanibek Zhauyrov's time in prison, the court in the city of Konaev refused to release him three times, despite legal grounds.

Death and public reaction

On July 23, 2024, Zhanibek Zhauyrov died in intensive care, without having the chance for his appeal to be considered. His death caused a wide public outcry and a new wave of criticism of the investigation and the court system in the Olimp case.

On August 2, 2024, a press conference was held with the participation of Zhauyrov's relatives and other convicts in the Olimp case. Human rights activist Anna Solodova of the Coalition of NGOs of Kazakhstan against Torture described the death of Zhanibek Zhauyrov as torture and ill-treatment prohibited by international law.

Article 17 of the Constitution clearly states that no one shall be subjected to torture or ill-treatment. In addition, Kazakhstan has assumed voluntary, I emphasize, voluntary obligations under several international conventions and covenants. And they provide for freedom from torture. Freedom from torture is an absolute right. This situation, unfortunately, is not the first case. As you said, this is a system that has not created conditions of detention for people with disabilities to be there. I believe on behalf of my organization, we can assist in planning a strategic litigation, because this case can be considered by the UN Committee against Torture and the Human Rights Committee under several articles. In addition, in fact, the circumstances that we talked about: Long-term failure to provide timely medical care, lack of access to specialists, understanding the conclusions of doctors, experts who say that a person urgently needs medical care, but at the same time it is not provided – this is torture, ill-treatment. A person in isolation cannot consult a specialist at his own discretion, a person does not have access to civilian hospitals. And then the question arises - the state should be responsible for this. And, unfortunately, in this situation, it is extremely difficult to seek justice, because the person is gone, and he cannot say what he experienced and what he felt. And there are already several cases that have been issued by international instances that confirm these circumstances. So we are ready to provide assistance and help from the point of view of the legal system.

— Anna Solodova, Coalition of NGOs of Kazakhstan against Torture

Experts and public figures also pointed to the possible connection between the refusal to release Zhauyrov and the nature of the Olimp case. They emphasized that this case, which began in 2019, had all the signs of political persecution and was aimed at eliminating a major player in the Kazakh betting market who opposed a bill creating a private monopoly in the betting industry, known as the Betting Accounting Center. After Olimp's liquidation through the government's criminal cases, the private "Betting Accounting Center" was legalized in just a few months. "Olimp" had fought against the establishment of the same organization for several years.

Criticism and consequences

Zhauyrov's death has intensified criticism of Kazakhstan's judicial system and brought international attention to the Olimp case. This event is seen as a prime example of the ills of the country's justice system and raises serious questions about the observance of human rights in Kazakhstan's penitentiary system.

Relatives of the convicts and human rights activists called for a review of the Olimp case and the punishment of those responsible for Zhauyrov's death, emphasizing that every day of delay could lead to new tragedies and further damage to Kazakhstan's reputation in the international arena.
