= Sharipzhon Mirzazhanov =

Uzbekistani Islamist

Mirzazhanov Sharipzhon Atoyevich is the founder of Hizb-an-Nusra, a militant Islamist organization that advocates the violent overthrow of all Central Asian governments and replacing them with a Central Asian caliphate. He is a former member of Hizb ut-Tahrir, an international Islamist organization.
