= Akromiya =

Uzbek Islamist organization

Akromiya (sometimes referred to as Akramiya, Russian: Акрамия) is allegedly an Islamist organization founded by Akrom Yo‘ldoshev.

Akromiya broke away from Hizb ut-Tahrir, a terrorist organization according to the Kazakhstan government, when Akrom Yo‘ldoshev formed Akromiya in the Fergana Valley area in Uzbekistan in 1996. The Uzbek Government says Yo‘ldoshev's pamphlet Iymonga Yul (Way to Faith) criticizes HT's goal of creating an international caliphate for impracticality. Yo‘ldoshev argues in favor of creating an Islamic state on a local level instead.

Muhammad Sadik Muhammad Yusuf, the former Chief Mufti of Uzbekistan, said, "Akromiya has nothing in common with Hizb-ut-Tahrir, and other radical political Islamic organisations. It is for entirely different reasons that I consider Akrom Yo‘ldoshev's teaching a heresy." Yusuf says Yo‘ldoshev teaches that Muslims do not have to pray five times daily or fast during Ramadan. Sarah Kendzior, a scholar of Central Asia writing in the journal Demokratizatsiya, cast doubt on the group's existence, arguing that the Uzbek government created the organization to justify putting down the 2005 civil unrest in Uzbekistan.

== Andijan massacre ==
Forum 18, a human rights organization based in Norway, reported that during the Andijan massacre members of Akromiya "who had acquired weapons did not prevent free movement out of the square by those gathered there, but their attitude to the hostages did not meet international standards for the treatment of prisoners of war. Forum 18 learnt that several hostages received severe beatings. The hostages had wire tied round their necks and were placed at the perimeter of the square as human shields. Therefore the first to die from the shots fired by Uzbek government forces were the hostages."

== See also ==
- Hizb-an-Nusra
- Jama'at al-Jihad al-Islami
- Terrorism in Uzbekistan
- Terrorism in Kazakhstan
- Counter-terrorism in Kazakhstan
