= Terrorism in Uzbekistan =

Prior to the 2001 invasion of Afghanistan, the Islamic Movement of Uzbekistan (IMU) posed the greatest threat to the Karimov administration. In 2002 the IMU was reclassified as terrorist by the United States. Since the invasion, the IMU has been greatly weakened due to US military actions which cut off its supply of resources and killed its leader, Juma Namangani.

The largest terrorist attacks were the 1999 Tashkent bombings, the IMU invasions of 2000-2001, and the Tashkent attacks of March and July 2004.

== State terrorism ==
After visiting Uzbekistan in 2002 the UN Special Rapporteur on Torture found torture and ill-treatment of prisoners to be systematic. Human Rights Watch estimated in 2004 that there were over 6,000 Uzbeks in prison for practising Islam outside of the state-run religious establishment.

According to HRW, "In addition to hundreds of reports of beatings and numerous accounts of the use of electric shock, temporary suffocation, hanging by the ankles or wrists, removal of fingernails, and punctures with sharp objects, Human Rights Watch received credible reports in 2000 that police sodomized male detainees with bottles, raped them, and beat and burned them in the groin area. Male and female detainees were regularly threatened with rape. Police made such threats in particular against female detainees in the presence of male relatives to force the men to sign self-incriminating statements. Police also regularly threatened to murder detainees or their family members and to place minor children in orphanages. Self-incriminating testimony obtained through torture was routinely admitted by judges, who cited this as evidence, often the only evidence, to convict. Courts did not initiate investigations into allegations of mistreatment by police."

Human rights organizations have detailed the improper "imposition of capital punishment" since Uzbekistan's independence.

== 1999 ==
On February 16, 1999, six car bombs exploded in Tashkent, killing 16 and injuring more than 100, in what may have been an attempt to assassinate President Islam Karimov. The IMU was blamed.

== 2001 ==
The Uzbek government agreed on 7 October 2001 to allow US troops and planes to use Uzbekistan's airspace and stay at Karshi-Khanabad airbase, and to convene "urgent" bilateral security talks with the United States if Taliban fighters spread fighting north into Uzbekistan. They agreed in a joint statement to seek to "eliminate international terrorism and its infrastructure. For these purposes, the Republic of Uzbekistan has agreed to provide the use of its airspace and necessary military and civilian infrastructure of one of its airports, which would be used in the first instance for humanitarian purposes." A week earlier Defense Secretary Donald Rumsfeld visited Uzbekistan and met with President Islam Karimov. Karimov agreed to assist the US in the war on terror by lending Karshi-Khanabad for "humanitarian" search and rescue missions. Taliban officials warned the Uzbek government that they would be attacked if they helped in the US invasion. 1,000 US troops were sent to Karshi-Khanabad between Rumsfeld's visit and the second agreement of 7 October. At the same time the Taliban sent 10,000 troops to the Afghanistan-Uzbekistan border. A spokesman for the Uzbek Foreign Ministry said, "Concentrating 10,000 troops on the border would be a dangerous tactic for the Taliban, because they would become targets for US bombing raids." State Department spokesman Richard Boucher said Uzbekistan is "a country that we've worked with for many years in the past to help them with border security, to help them with anti-terrorism efforts and (there are) terrorism and threats coming at them from Afghanistan."

== 2004 ==
=== March–April violence ===
The IMU launched a series of attacks in Tashkent and Bukhara in March and April 2004. Gunmen and female suicide bombers took part in the attacks, which mainly targeted police. The violence killed 33 militants, 10 policemen, and four civilians. The government blamed Hizb ut-Tahrir, though the Islamic Jihad Union (IJU) claimed responsibility.

Furkat Kasimovich Yusupov was arrested in the first half of 2004, and charged as the leader of a group that had carried out the March 28 bombing on behalf of Hizb ut-Tahrir.

=== Embassy bombings ===
On July 30, 2004, suicide bombers struck the entrances of the US and Israeli embassies in Tashkent. Two Uzbek security guards were killed in both bombings. The IJU again claimed responsibility.

Foreign commentators on Uzbek affairs speculated that the 2004 violence could have been the work of the IMU, Al-Qaeda, Hizb ut-Tahrir, or some other radical Islamic organization.

== Cooperation with other states in the region ==
=== Aftermath of Andijan massacre ===
The deaths of many people during unrest in the Uzbek city of Andijan on 12 and 13 May 2005 has been widely characterised as a massacre by state forces. President Nursultan Nazarbayev of Kazakhstan, while on a state visit to Uzbekistan after that event, told Uzbek President Islam Karimov that the Uzbek government's actions in quelling unrest helped "protect the peace of 26 million Uzbekistanis. A different outcome would have destabilized the region today." He said that because terrorists had taken over government buildings and prisons, Karimov could not have responded otherwise to the unrest, and other governments had taken similar action in the past. The Uzbek government attributed the unrest to Islamic extremist groups classed as terrorist organizations in Uzbekistan. The Uzbek government estimated that 187 people (94 terrorists, 60 civilians, 31 policemen and two others) died, and that 76 terrorists were injured. Human rights groups dispute the government's estimate, accusing Uzbek security forces of killing about 700 civilians. Ikrom Yakubov, a former major in the Uzbek secret police who defected, alleged that President Karimov himself ordered the troops to fire on the protestors, and that 1,500 were killed. He also claimed that the instigation was a false flag operation, and that the Uzbek government itself had "propped up" the Islamic group Akramia, whom Uzbek authorities blamed for initiating the incident.

=== Extradition of terrorist suspects ===
On 5 July 2005 Human Rights Watch called upon the Kazakh government to refrain from handing over Lutfullo Shamsudinov, the Andijan representative for the Human Rights Society of Uzbekistan, then in detention in Almaty, to the Uzbek government. The Office of the United Nations High Commissioner for Refugees had given Shamsudinov refugee status and planned to resettle him when Kazakh authorities detained him on 4 July. Earlier that day President Karimov visited Kazakhstan along with other regional nations' representatives as part of a Shanghai Cooperation Organisation meeting. The Uzbek government requested Shamsudinov's extradition, charging him with five criminal acts including premeditated murder. Holly Cartner of Human Rights Watch said "Kazakhstan should step forward and protect this brave man. Instead of that, the authorities seem ready to hand over a refugee to be tortured, in blatant violation of international law." In response to statements made by a representative for the Almaty city prosecutor's office, in which the representative called Shamsudinov a terrorist, Cartner said, "The terrorist accusation is a perversion of international concerns about terrorism and an attempt to block international support for Shamsudinov. In reality, he is someone who worked tirelessly towards the rule of law in Uzbekistan."

Russia also deported an asylum seeker to Uzbekistan, Rustam Muminov, and Kyrgyzstan deported five Andijan refugees - Jahongir Maqsudov, Yoqub Toshboev, Odiljon Rahimov, Rasuljon Pirmatov, and Fayoz Tojihalilov - to Uzbekistan in early August 2006. An Uzbek court later found Muminov, accused of participating in the unrest in Andijan, guilty of membership in Hizb ut-Tahrir and sentenced him on 15 March to five years and six months in prison.

=== Extradition of Huseyincan Celil ===
Uzbek government officials said on 5 May 2006 that evidence proved that Huseyincan Celil, a Canadian citizen, and Guler Dilaver, a Uyghur wanted for terrorism in China and Kyrgyzstan, were the same person. When Uzbek police arrested him he had documentation identifying him as Celil, but the Interpol National Central Bureau in Tashkent supported the Uzbek government's position. The Kyrgyz government wanted Dilaver extradited for his alleged involvement in the March 2000 killing of Nigmat Baizakov, head of the Uyghur Society in Kyrgyzstan, and the Chinese government wanted him for the May 2000 attack on a Xinjiang state delegation. Celil was eventually extradited to China where he was tried and sentenced to 15 years' imprisonment. The case remains an irritant in Canada's relations with China.

=== Security fence ===
Kazakh border officials began building a 45-kilometre-long (28 mi) fence on the border with Uzbekistan on 19 October 2006. The New York Times reported that the fence would be eight feet high with barbed wire and searchlights "along heavily populated towns and cities on the southern ridge" where drug smugglers operate. The area is a "flash point in a larger regional struggle against Islamic militants."

The governments of Kazakhstan and Uzbekistan first created national border guard forces in 1992 and January 1998 respectively, far earlier than other post-Soviet Union nations. The Kazakh government raised the force in status, ending the State Security Committee's control until the Committee regained control in 1998.

Other Central Asian nations have had border disputes in the past. Turkmenistan and Uzbekistan had serious "issues" regarding their mutual border until May 2004. The Turkmen Foreign Ministry released a statement on 31 May 2004 saying disputes had been resolved.

Erik Roslyakov, second in command of Kazakhstan's southern border, said the fence would cover the Saryaghash and Maktaaral Districts. A spokeswoman for Kazakhstan's border administration said the border patrol's "task will now be easier. We will be in a position to use our weapons, as it is the rule when one wants to catch [trespassers]."

=== Pakistan ===
Senator Mushahid Hussain Syed, Chairman of the Pakistani Senate's Foreign Relations Committee, gave a speech to the Institute of Strategic and Regional Studies, a think tank run by the Uzbek government, on 13 January 2007. He discussed Pakistan-Uzbekistan relations and counter-terrorism cooperation between both countries, specifically how both countries, as neighbors of Afghanistan could work together to prevent it from becoming a center of terrorism and drug trafficking. Sayed suggested an annual dialogue between state-run think tanks to discuss counter-terrorism.

== Drug trafficking ==
Drug trafficking in Central Asia is a major source of funding for terrorist organizations, second only to direct donations of military equipment and financing from state sponsors of terrorism. The government of Tajikistan asked Russia on 15 May 2004 to begin withdrawing some of its 20,000 troops from Tajikistan's border with Afghanistan. The withdrawal of troops concerned the US government because the troop presence helped prevent cross-border drug trafficking. On 28 May 2004, President Karimov and Tajik President Imomali Rakhmonov said drug trafficking in Afghanistan needed to be solved by forces within the country; drug traffickers were estimated to make $3.5 billion annually.
