= Criminal Code of Kazakhstan =

Kazakh criminal law

The Criminal Code of the Republic of Kazakhstan (Kazakh: Қазақстан Республикасының Қылмыстық кодексі, romanized: Qazaqstan Respublikasynyñ Qylmystyq kodeksı; Russian: Уголовный кодекс Республики Казахстан, romanized: Ugolovnyy kodeks Respubliki Kazakhstan) is the defunct criminal law that functioned in Kazakhstan from 1998 to 2014, which defined criminality and punishable acts within the country.

The Criminal Code was first signed into law on 16 July 1997 and came into effect on 1 January 1998, replacing the previous Criminal Code of the Kazakh SSR from 1959. The Code consisted of General and Special Parts and covered fundamental concepts of criminal law, grounds for criminal liability, and specific crimes. In 2014, it underwent a substitution, making way for it to be replaced by the Penal Code of Kazakhstan.

== History ==
Following the dissolution of the Soviet Union in 1991, the Criminal Code of the Kazakh SSR originally adopted in 1959 remained as the primary source of criminal law in Kazakhstan. However, recognizing the need for modernization and in accordance with evolving legal standards, the Criminal Code of Kazakhstan was established on 16 July 1997 under the Law No. 167 signed by President Nursultan Nazarbayev, which came into force on 1 January 1998. Throughout its existence, the Code underwent regular amendments to adapt to changing social relations and emerging criminal acts.

The Criminal Code of Kazakhstan was ultimately supplanted in 2014 by the new Penal Code of Kazakhstan.

== Structure ==
The Criminal Code consists of General (Sections I–VII) and Special Parts (Chapters 1–16). Unlike most codes of former Soviet states, it employs a two-level structure, with the General Part divided into sections and the Special Part into chapters; smaller divisions are absent.

The General Part covers fundamental concepts of criminal law, grounds for criminal liability and exemption from it, general provisions on criminal punishment and exemption, compulsory measures of treatment, and special aspects of criminal liability for minors.

The Special Part includes articles describing the elements of specific crimes. Its structure reflects the hierarchy of values protected by criminal law, with crimes against individuals taking precedence, followed by crimes against families and minors, constitutional rights and freedoms, crimes against peace and security of humanity, constitutional order and state security, and property crimes.

== Features ==
The Criminal Code of Kazakhstan is largely based on provisions from the existing criminal law for the member states of the Commonwealth of Independent States (CIS), as many norms are borrowed from Criminal Code of Russia.

The Code retains several norms characteristic of Soviet criminal codes, including considering intoxication as an aggravating circumstance, the possibility of interrupting the statute of limitations due to committing a new crime, and maintaining liability for failing to report a known, prepared, or committed particularly serious crime.

It also provides for penalties for crimes such as violating the order of organizing and conducting meetings, rallies, pickets, street marches, and demonstrations (Article 334); leading a banned strike or obstructing the work of an enterprise, organization under a state of emergency (Article 335); unlawful interference of members of public associations in the activities of state bodies (Article 336); establishing or participating in the activities of illegal public associations (Article 337); providing assistance to political parties and professional unions of foreign states (Article 338), and more. It also includes liability for encroachment on the honor and dignity and obstruction of the President of Kazakhstan (Article 318) and deputies of the Parliament of the Republic of Kazakhstan (Article 319) (except for public statements containing critical remarks about the President's policies or parliamentary activities).

The act of bribery-gratitude has been decriminalized: if the reward is given to a public official without prior agreement for previously committed lawful actions (inactions), and if the value of the gift does not exceed two monthly calculation indicators, no liability arises Article 311(2) and Article 312(1).

== See also ==
- Capital punishment in Kazakhstan
