= Capital punishment in Kazakhstan =

Capital punishment in Kazakhstan was abolished for all crimes in 2021. Until 2021, it had been abolished for ordinary crimes but was still permitted for crimes occurring in special circumstances (such as war crimes). The legal method of execution in Kazakhstan had been shooting, specifically a single shot to the back of the head.

The last known executions in Kazakhstan took place in 2003, when 17 men were executed by shooting between May and November. On 17 December 2003, President Nursultan Nazarbayev introduced a moratorium on executions, and later commuted the death sentences of some 40 inmates to life in prison. In 2007, Kazakhstan amended its Constitution, abolishing the death penalty for all crimes except terrorist acts that cause loss of human life and exceptionally grave crimes committed during wartime.

In 2014, Amnesty International classified Kazakhstan as "Abolitionist for ordinary crimes only". Additionally, women could not be sentenced to death under Kazakh law.

Since the moratorium was instituted, six people have been sentenced to death in Kazakhstan. All have since had their death sentences commuted.

In 2008 and 2016, Kazakhstan voted in favor of the UN moratorium on the death penalty.

On 23 September 2020, President Kassym-Jomart Tokayev announced that Kazakhstan had signed the Second Optional Protocol to the International Covenant on Civil and Political Rights and ratified it on 24 March 2022. The protocol requires all signatories to commit to abolishing the death penalty, with Tokayev adding that Kazakhstan signed it "[to] fulfill a fundamental right to life and human dignity," with the intention of soon abolishing the death penalty within its borders.

== Notable death sentences since 2003 ==
In 2006, former police officer Rustam Ibragimov was sentenced to death for masterminding the assassination of prominent politician Altynbek Sarsenbayuly. In 2014, Ibragimov's death sentence was commuted to life imprisonment. Until 2016, Ibragimov was the last person to receive a death sentence in Kazakhstan.

In November 2016, a court in Kazakhstan sentenced mass-murderer Ruslan Kulikbayev to death for terrorism after he was convicted of killing ten people (including 8 policemen) in a shooting attack against police officers in Almaty. Kulikbayev's death sentence was commuted to life imprisonment in 2021 after Kazakhstan abolished the death penalty for all crimes.
