= Akrom Yoʻldoshev =

Uzbekistani terrorist (1963–2010/2011)

Akram Yuldashev
- Born: Akramjon Yoʻldashev; June 25, 1963; Andijon, Uzbek SSR
- Died: 2010/2011; Uzbekistan
- Other name: Akram Yolʻldoshev
- Occupation: Math teacher
- Known for: Involvement in Islamism

Akrom Yoʻldoshev or Akramjon Yoʻldoshev or Akram Yuldashev (Russian: Акрам Юлдашев; Uzbek: Акром Йўлдошев; Akram Yuldashev; June 25, 1963 – 2010/2011) was the founder of Akromiya, an Islamist organization that operates in Uzbekistan. The Uzbek government has designated and banned Akromiya as a terrorist.

== Early life ==
Yoʻldoshev was a native of Andijan, Uzbekistan and was trained as an engineer. He worked as a math teacher and for a furniture company in Andijan, before forming Akromiya. In 1992 he published Iymonga Yul, a pamphlet advocating Islamic values that gained him support among the populace. Uzbek police arrested him in April, 1998 for possession of narcotics. A court sentenced him to 30 months imprisonment, but the government released him in December 1998 due to an amnesty.

== Involvement in Islamism ==
Police arrested him in February 1999, the day after the 1999 Tashkent bombings that killed 16 people, accusing him of involvement. A court sentenced him to 17 years imprisonment for heading Akromiya.

Critics of the Uzbek government doubted that he was guilty of the charges against him. Scott Horton of the Columbia Law School has said "There's nothing that involves a challenge to government." Alisher Ilkhamov, an Uzbek who is a sociologist at the University of London, said "The government perceives any grass-roots movement with hostility, whether it's Islamic or not". These critics claimed that "the fierce response to Yuldashev stems from the government's deep fear of any religious group that operates without official sanction".

In 2005, an armed uprising took place in Andijan. Among the demands was the release of Akrom Yoʻldoshev. The Uzbek government cracked down, and several hundred civilians were killed in the events that ended the uprising.

== Family ==
His wife, Yodgoroy Yoʻldosheva, has lived in Boise, Idaho, United States along with 52 other refugees since the Andijan massacre in May 2005. Yoʻldoshev has appeared on state-run television three times, apologizing for encouraging the unrest and telling refugees they should return to Uzbekistan. Yoʻldosheva herself has asked the Uzbek government for permission to return, but has not yet received an answer. His wife has denied Yoʻldoshev had any ties to the Islamic Movement of Uzbekistan, a militant organization affiliated with Al-Qaeda, or Hizb ut-Tahrir, another Islamist organization.

== Death ==
Yoʻldoshev's trial appearances in late 2005 were the last times anyone outside the government ever saw him. His fate remained a mystery until 2016.

International rights groups such as U.S.-based Human Rights Watch (HRW) repeatedly released statements calling on Uzbekistan's government to provide information on whereabouts of Yuldashev.

In January 2016, Uzbek Service announced that Yoʻldoshev died in 2010/2011 of tuberculosis while imprisoned.
