= MCM pistol =

Margolin pistol
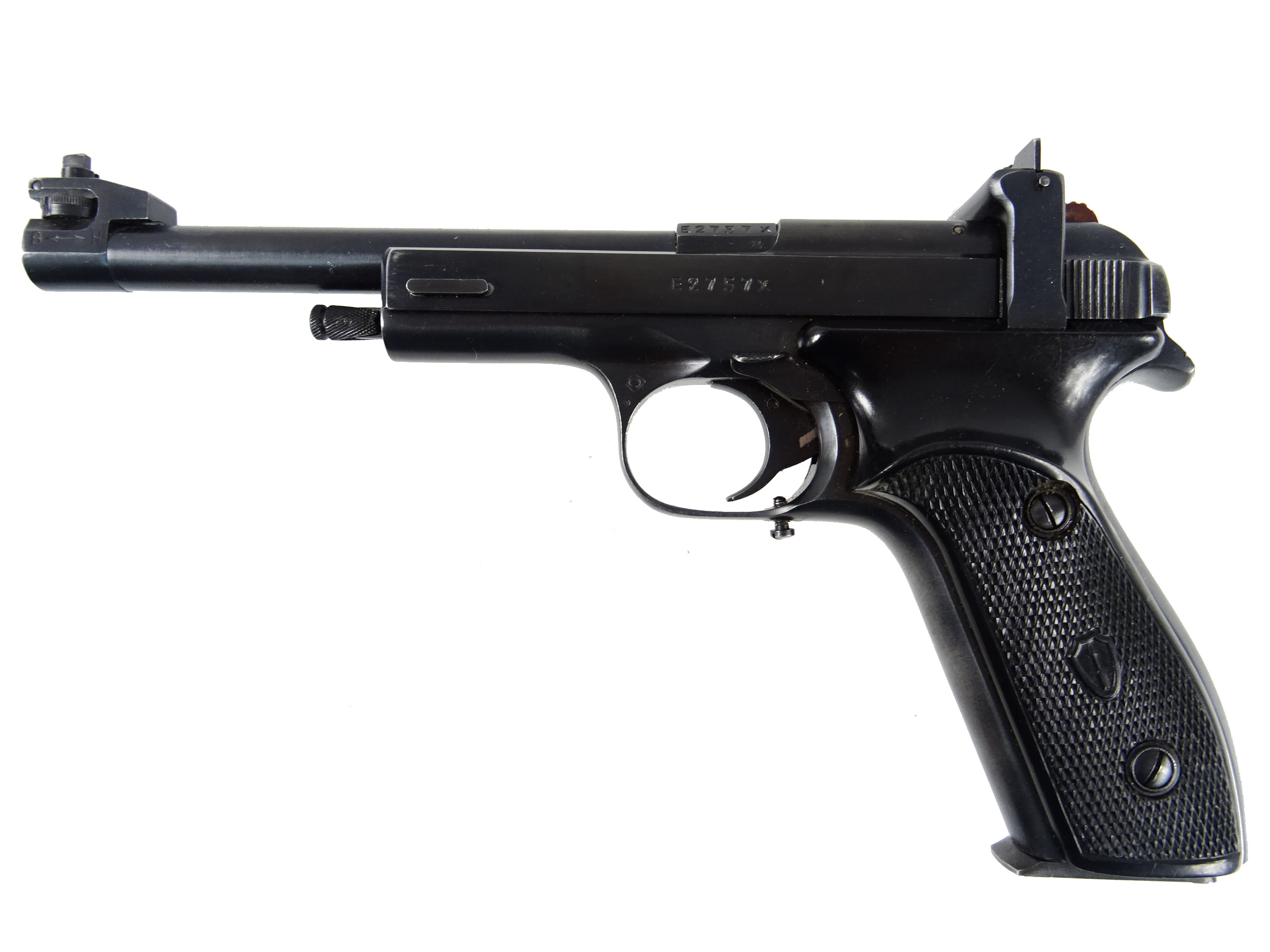
- Baikal MCM
- Type: Semi-automatic pistol
- Place of origin: Soviet Union

Service history
- In service: 1950s–present

Production history
- Designer: Mikhail Margolin
- Designed: 1946–1948

Specifications
- Mass: 0,91 kg
- Length: 245 mm
- Barrel length: 150 mm (6 Inch)
- Cartridge: .22LR
- Action: Semi-automatic
- Rate of fire: 35
- Muzzle velocity: ~240m/s
- Feed system: 5 or 10 rounds
- Sights: Adjustable iron sights-rad.190mm, optional mount required for optical sights

The Margolin or (MCM pistol) Practice Shooting Pistol (Russian: Пистолет Марголина Целевой Малокалиберный) is a .22 LR pistol, primarily used for competitive target shooting in 25m Standard Pistol class under the rules of the International Shooting Sport Federation for bullseye round-target shooting at 25 m. The Margolin has been used since the 1950s, and complies with all international competition standards.

== History ==
The pistol was designed by Mikhail Vladimirovich Margolin (1906–1975). It was produced since 1948 and made its international debut at the 36th World Shooting Championships held in 1954 at Caracas, Venezuela.

The pistol was very accurate, reliable and economically priced, with a functional and simple design. Margolin designed the pistol while he was blind – he was fighting in the Red Army against the bandits in the aftermath of the Russian Civil War, and in April 1924 (at the age of 18), received a head injury resulting in total loss of vision.

There is some criticism of the pistol's elevated plane of sight, blaming it on an incorrect notion that the designer could not aim his pistol. However, Margolin's raised plane of sight is a deliberate design feature that increased the accuracy of the pistol. The bridge that made the rear sight stationary combined with the unusually high sights allows the shooter to hold the pistol lower and aligns the barrel with the shoulder, improving the shooter's control during rapid fire competition. The high line of sight is a design feature that Margolin's designs had in common with the AK-47. The AK-47, also designed between 1946 and 1948, had high sights which lowered the barrel, putting it more in line with the shoulder and reducing muzzle climb. The barrel, being comparatively light-weight, can be equipped with an under barrel weight for added steadiness.

== Variants ==
The Chinese produced PS-01 variant, made at Factory 66.

- MTs-1 (МЦ-1)
- MCM Standard Small-bore Pistol (Пистолет малокалиберный стандартный МЦМ) – since 1955
- MTsU (МЦУ) – since 1955
- Baikal "Margo" (МЦМ-К «Марго») – A more concealable version of the pistol, Margo is available for a less formal target shooting and self-defence applications. The barrel is shortened to 98 mm and original sights are simplified in this version.
- MP-449 – .25 ACP variant
- IZh-77 (ИЖ-77) – non-lethal gas pistol

There were also a limited quantity made by the Norinco in China called "PS-01". Compared with the original, the Chinese version has some subtle differences, including the fully adjustable rear sight system and non-adjustable front sight blade and threaded muzzle.

== Users ==
- Soviet Union
- Armenia: MCM used as training firearm in police;
- Australia: for sport shooting
- Czechoslovakia: for sport shooting
- China
- Kazakhstan
- Russia
- Ukraine
- United Kingdom: target pistols MTs-1 were exported from the USSR to the UK and used by sport shooters

== Sources ==
- Спортивный малокалиберный самозарядный пистолет конструкции Марголина // Охотничье, спортивное огнестрельное оружие. Каталог. М., 1958. стр.74-75
