= 2011 Aktobe bombing =

Terrorist attack in Aktobe, Kazakhstan

Coordinates: 50.2831°N 57.2233°E

- Location: Aktobe, Kazakhstan
- Date: 17 May 2011
- Target: KNB** department
- Attack type: Suicide bombing, Islamic terrorism, Bombing, Anti-police sentiment
- Weapon: Improvised explosive device
- Deaths: 2 (including the perpetrator)
- Injuries: 4
- Perpetrator: Rakhimzhan Makatov

The 2011 Aktobe bombing was a terrorist attack in the city of Aktobe, Kazakhstan on 17 May 2011. The attacker entered the local headquarters of the National Security Committee in the Aktobe region and set off a suicide bomb, killing himself and injuring three others. Initially, the bombing was blamed on "organized crime" in what was considered the first mafia-related suicide bombing in history. Some newspapers said that Rakhimzhan Makatov, the bomber, was a member of an organized criminal group. However, Kazakhstani officials eventually conceded that the attack was probably linked to Islamic extremists in the oil-rich province. The attack marked the opening of a violent summer in Kazakhstan's west, during which multiple attacks, including the country's "first ever suicide bombing" claimed the lives of a combined 19 people.

== See also ==
- Terrorism and counterterrorism in Kazakhstan
