= Terrorism in Kazakhstan =

The threat of terrorism in Kazakhstan plays an increasingly important role in relations with the United States which in 2006 were at an all-time high. Kazakhstan has taken Uzbekistan's place as the favored partner in Central Asia for both Russia and the United States. Kazakhstan's counter-terrorism efforts resulted in the country's 94th ranking among 130 countries in the 2016 Global Terrorism Index published by the Institute for Economics and Peace. The higher the position on the ranking is, the bigger the impact of terrorism in the country. Kazakhstan's 94th place puts it in a group of countries with the lowest impact of terrorism.

== Banned terrorist organizations ==
On 12 October 2006 the Supreme Court approved a revised list of banned terrorist organizations and the Prosecutor General released the list. The terrorist organizations the government has banned are the Islamic Movement of Uzbekistan, Islamic Front of Kazakhstan, Hizb ut-Tahrir al-Islami, Jamaat of Central Asian Mujahedins, Islamic Party of Eastern Turkestan, Kurdistan Workers Party, Boz Kurt, Lashkar-e-Toiba, Social Reforms Society (in Kuwait), Asbat an-Ansar (in Israel), Al-Qaeda, Taliban, and the Muslim Brotherhood. When the Supreme Court initially added the JCMA and six other organizations to its list in March 2006, critics said that the Muslim Brotherhood and Lashkar-e-Toiba do not operate in Kazakhstan on a level sufficient to justify inclusion in the list. Saulebek Zhamkenuly, press secretary for the Prosecutor-General's Office, said, "It doesn't mean all these organizations are active in Kazakhstan. The decision to ban them is a preventive measure. These organizations are considered as terrorist in the Russian Federation, the United States, Turkey, Uzbekistan, and Pakistan."

The Supreme Court added Aum Shinrikyo and the East Turkestan Liberation Organization to the list of banned terrorist organizations on 17 November 2006. Both organizations have members in Kazakhstan.

=== Ties between designated terrorist organizations ===
Hizb-ut-Tahrir is banned in Uzbekistan, Tajikistan, and Kyrgyzstan. The Kyrgyz government banned HuT after it declared a jihad against Kyrgyz police on 19 July 2006. Kyrgyz and Uzbek government officials say that there are ties between Hizb-ut-Tahrir, the Islamic Movement of Uzbekistan, and the Islamic extremist group Akromiya. Kazakh Prosecutor-General Rashid Tusupbekov asked the Astana City Court to ban HuT because of its terrorist activities on 16 March 2005. Press secretary Zhamkenuly said it is "very probable that Hizb ut-Tahrir has connections with the Taliban, Al-Qaeda, and other extremist groups. Therefore, under the Kazakh law banning extremism, we have every reason to outlaw Hizb ut-Tahrir's activities on Kazakh territory."

=== Aum Shinrikyo and East Turkestan Liberation Organization ===
Askar Amerkhanov, deputy chief of staff of Kazakhstan's counterterrorism center, asked the Prosecutor-General's Office and the Supreme Court to add Aum Shinrikyo and the East Turkestan Liberation Organization to the list of banned terrorist organizations on 15 September 2006. Amerkhanov said the National Security Committee (KNB) prevented an Aum Shinrikyo cell from forming in Kyzylorda.

The Supreme Court added both organizations to the list on 17 November 2006.

=== Al-Qaeda and the Islamic Movement of Uzbekistan ===
From 28 March-1 April 2004 two suicide bombers set off bombs in Tashkent, Uzbekistan. The bombings killed 47 people, 33 of whom were militants and 14 who were bystanders and policemen. The Islamic Movement of Uzbekistan, an organization affiliated with Al-Qaeda, and Islamic Jihad claimed responsibility. Uzbek President Islam Karimov claimed the perpetrators were ex-members of Hizb-ut-Tahrir.

The Uzbek security service's intelligence, according to Pravda, proves the involvement of Jamaat of Central Asian Mujahedins members. Tashkent police found a mobile phone used by the terrorists at the site of one of the bombings. The police later found that the terrorists had called associates in Kazakhstan. Police from both nations agreed to work together in investigating the bombing.

According to Tanya Costello, an analyst for Eurasia Group, the IMU has been nearly destroyed by the counter-terrorism efforts of the U.S., Kyrgyzstan, Uzbekistan, and Kazakhstan.

While Al-Qaeda has never said it has a direct presence in Kazakhstan, journalists raised the issue in a press conference held in February 2004 following a meeting between U.S. Defense Secretary Donald Rumsfeld and Kazakh Defense Minister Mukhtar Altynbayev. The Government of Pakistan had recently arrested Abdallah Tohtasinovich Magrupov, a suspected terrorist of Kazakh ethnicity, and his citizenship was unclear. Altynbayev expressed skepticism over the presence of Al-Qaeda members, saying the situation is "seriously controlled by the special services."

=== Hamas ===
The Union of Muslims of Kazakhstan invited Hamas leaders to Kazakhstan in 2006.

=== Hizb-ut-Tahrir ===
Hizb-ut-Tahrir first appeared in Kazakhstan in the south in the 1990s. Beibut Saparaly, a cleric at the Astana-based Kaganat religious education center, said in March 2005 that the "idea to create a caliphate is supported by many youth. Some years ago, we heard that Hizb ut-Tahrir had support in Shymkent and in Pavlodar. But lately, particularly after Qurban-Ayt, we learned that [Hizb ut-Tahrir] leaflets had been distributed in all mosques in the southern capital of Almaty." Kazakh police have arrested HuT members in southern Kazakhstan for several years, but the first arrests of members in northern Kazakhstan were in 2004. Novoye Pokoleniye has attributed the popularity of Hizb-ut-Tahrir to the social and economic conditions of the populace. One journalist wrote that illiteracy, poverty, and the "proximity of trouble spots allow various types of 'teachers' to act very freely there." Additionally, as "one head cell is cut off," it is "replaced by several new ones." The Kazakh government found the first Hizb-ut-Tahrir cell in Kentai in 2000. The HuT presence in Kazakhstan then spread in the country, primarily in southern Kazakhstan. Rashid Tusupbekov, the Prosecutor General, asked the Supreme Court to add Hizb ut-Tahrir to the list of banned terrorist organizations on 17 March 2005, citing its ties to Al-Qaeda and the Taliban.

Police arrested Kuanysh Bekzhanov, a 20-year-old student of law at the Humanitarian Institute, in November 2003 at Ordabasy square for distributing Hizb ut-Tahrir pamphlets. Upon a further search police uncovered 200 Hizb ut-Tahrir leaflets. Judge Adis Kerimshiyev of the Shymkent municipal court found Bekzhanov guilty on 4 August of violating part 2 of Article 164 of the Criminal Code of the Republic of Kazakhstan, "agitation of social, ethnic, clan, racial, or religious animosity," and Article 337, "creation or participation in the activities of illegal public associations." The court sentenced him to two years in prison.

Bombings in Uzbekistan in the spring and summer of 2004 killed more than 50 people. The Uzbek government attributed the bombings to HuT terrorists. Suspects said they were trained at a terrorist camp in Kazakhstan. The Kazakh government denied the allegation, but said the defendants had at one point lived in the Shymkent Oblast, which they reached by illegally crossing the border.

On 5 February 2005 police in Kentai, Kazakhstan found Hizb-ut-Tahrir books and leaflets in the attic of a resident's home. The books were written in Uzbek, Russian, and Kazakh. Police charged the resident with distributing extremist literature and encouraging religious strife. According to Marat Yermukanov of Eurasia Daily Monitor, "reports say" the resident "bought these publications at the market... to distribute the teachings of Hizb-ut-Tahrir" in Kentai. Kentai is "fertile ground" for Hizb-ut-Tahrir because of the poor economy and the government's "indifference to their woes." Yermukanov said that most police raids targeted HuT cells.

Three days later, on 8 February, Almaty police shut down an HuT printing facility, taking 12,400 leaflets and 53 booklets from an apartment building.

Hibratulla Doskaliyev, head of the South Kazakhstan Region interior department, criticized the government's handling of Hizb ut-Tahrir's growing popularity in August 2006. Doskaliyev said, "This is a very serious issue and only 14 [officers] are dealing with it. This is totally insufficient." The department subsequently increased personnel monitoring Hizb ut-Tahrir activity.

Beksultan Sarsenov, first deputy head of the CIS Anti-Terrorist Center, said Hizb-ut-Tahrir and Uyghur nationalists were the greatest threats to Kazakhstan's security. Sarsenov said that a "small group" of religious bigots and nationalists "think the country is only for Kazakhs" and "nationalist Russians who are convinced that they have the right to certain part of Kazakhstan's territory" threaten Kazakhstan.

In December 2005 the KNB extradited Rustam Chagilov, a suspected terrorist, to Russia. KNB officials detained an ethnic Uzbek and alleged member of HuT in Taraz, South Kazakhstan in April 2006. The KNB accused him of organizing an HuT cell Qoqon, Uzbekistan and extradited him to Uzbekistan.

Kenzhenbulat Beknazarov, spokesman for the KNB announced on 22 December 2006 in Astana that an HuT cell-network active in multiple towns had been shut down. Beknazarov said, "Computers, more than 25,000 pamphlets, some 70 copies of religious extremist books and advanced printing equipment were confiscated during our searches." Routes used to smuggle in extremist literature and foreign funding were also shut down.

=== Jamaat of Central Asian Mujahedins ===
In 2004 National Security Committee (KNB) officials claimed they had shut down the Jamaat of Central Asian Mujahedins. However, in 2006, they again claimed to have foiled a terrorist plot orchestrated by JCAM members.

==== 2004 ====
Vladimir Bozhko, first deputy chairman of Kazakhstan's National Security Committee (KNB), announced in a press conference on 11 November 2004 that the KNB had dismantled the Jamaat of Central Asian Mujahedins, arresting nine citizens of Kazakhstan and four of Uzbekistan. Police confiscated weapons, forged documents, a videotape of a speech given by Osama bin Laden, and what Radio Free Europe called "extremist propaganda." Four women, trained as suicide bombers, were detained. The government discovered that JCAM recruited 50 citizens of Uzbekistan and 20 of Kazakhstan since mid-2002. JCAM is, like the IMU, affiliated with Al Qaeda.

Zhakshybek Biimurzaev, headed JCAM's operations in Kazakhstan while Ahmad Bekmirzaev, headed operations in Uzbekistan. Both served in the IMU. Biimurzaev has been arrested by Uzbek police and the National Security Service of Kyrgyzstan. Uzbek police killed Bekmirzaev in a shoot-out near Tashkent on 30 March. Biimurzaev is reported as having said, "This year there were three terror attacks in Tashkent in July. I organized them on the instruction of my amir Usman. Three Kazakh citizens took part in them. I was opposed to this, but the amir ordered it." Usman later ordered Biimurzaev to assassinate what Radio Free Europe referred to as a "high-ranking Uzbek official."

Uzbek officials said Avaz Shoyusupov, a Kazakh citizen, is one of the suicide bombers who died in the 30 July attacks. Bekmirzaev's wife, Makhira Ibragimova, and Isa Eruov, Kazakh citizens, killed themselves in suicide bombing attacks in Uzbekistan in spring 2004. Police caught Aidos Usmonov, an Uzbek citizen and an aide of Biimurzaev, in Pavlodar, Kazakhstan. Usmonov had recently returned from Russia, where he allegedly recruited for JCAM. The Kazakh government extradited Uzbek terrorist suspects arrested in Kazakhstan to Uzbekistan.

Deutsche Welle and the Uzbek government reported that 15 suspects charged in relation to the Tashkent bombings were trained in terrorist camps in South Waziristan, Pakistan and in "private apartments" in Shymkent, and other cities, in Kazakhstan. Deputy Chairman Bozhko disagreed, saying "there were no camps and bases for training terrorists on the territory of our country."

==== 2006 ====
President Nazarbayev on 18 April 2006 said the KNB needed to do more to protect the nation's security. Sergei Minenkov, National Security Committee member in charge of counter-terrorism, announced the day after that a KNB-Interior Ministry operation had prevented a major terrorist attack with assistance from the security services of an unnamed foreign nation and again shut down JCAM, calling it a "criminal gang set up for terrorist activities." Some interpreted Minenkov's statements as a response to Nazarbayev's criticism.

Minenkov said the plot involved bombing the offices of security officials, government buildings, and public safety facilities. The ten suspects, who allegedly acted on instructions from a foreign nation, were charged with 'instigating religious strife' and illegal possession of firearms.

When the operation took place, JCAM members were, according to ISN Security Watch, "monitoring Kyrgyz political activities." 10 JCAM members in Almaty were arrested and police confiscated weapons and extremist books and tapes. The suspects were recruiting Kazakh citizens and establishing terror bases when they were arrested.

Minenkov said, "Foreign ideologists of terrorism recommended attacking public places and strategically important infrastructure facilities" in letters found by police. Seized documents included instructions on explosive construction and maps of targets. Serikbai Alibayev of For a Just Kazakhstan opposition coalition said, "The National Security Committee's accusation against the opposition—that it could have joined the terrorist group—is nothing less than blame based on nothing. According to our laws and the constitution, law-enforcement agencies immediately should open a case against the National Security Committee and start an investigation. They should be brought to court for saying that—they are violating our constitution." Zauresh Battalova, also of For a Just Kazakhstan, said, "The National Security Committee is a tool in the hands of the authorities. Today, the National Security Committee is following the authorities' order to discredit those who really care about people in order to stop them. It's the National Security Committee that should be brought to justice. They have to answer for their activities, the activities of the special Arystan unit, and the deaths of Altynbek and Zamanbek. Problems cannot be solved by Dutbayev's resignation alone."

The KNB discovered and disrupted a terror cell in Stepnogorsk on 16 November. They arrested eleven Islamic terrorists, who were planning on carrying out attacks to create an Islamist republic in Central Asia. One of the terrorists shot at police officers as they broke up the cell. On 27 December the KNB broke up the "Stepnogorsk zhamaat terrorist group," confiscating weapons and literature inciting terrorism. Members of the organization were planning on robbing businesses to fund assassinations of civil servants.

In January 2006 convicted JMCA terrorists were sentenced to prison terms ranging from eight to twenty-five years in prison.

==== 2011 ====
In July 2011, nine people suspected of involvement in the killing of two policeman in the northwestern Aktobe Province were killed in a firefight with policemen. A Kazakh special forces member was also killed.

The region has seen a rise in militant Islamic activity, although there are also grievances involving the police and economic issues.

The incident came a few weeks after the first suicide bombing in Kazakhstan in Aktobe. Rahimjan Makhatov blew himself up on May 17 inside the Aktobe offices of the National Security Committee, killing himself and injuring two others. Kazakh authorities said this was related to criminal activities rather than Islamic militancy.

In November 2011, 4 police officers and a security guard and another civilian were killed by a suicide bomber in the city of Taraz. The security guard was killed in an attack on an armoury where two guns were stolen, then militant killed two police officers with these weapons and then blew it when he was arrested killing another police officer.

=== Tablighi Jamaat ===
Tablighi Jamaat, an Islamic missionary organization that is banned in Uzbekistan and has alleged ties to Al-Qaeda, is not considered a terrorist organization by the Government of Kazakhstan, but some members have been fined and deported for violating Kazakhstan's laws on missionary activity. Askar Amerkhanov, head of the National Security Committee Secret Police's Anti-terrorism Center, said, "It is true that at first we did have suspicions that Tabligh was an extremist organisation. But having studied its teachings we have concluded that it is simply an Islamic missionary organisation. Tabligh's problem is that its supporters are preaching without having registered with the authorities." Kairat Tulesov, deputy head of the Justice Ministry's Religious Affairs Committee, said, "Tabligh supporters simply have to observe Kazakh law and then they can pursue their activities without hindrance."

== Russian separatism ==
In November 1999 the KNB arrested 22 people, 12 of whom were Russian citizens, in Öskemen for planning to overthrow the government and seized rifle cartridges and petrol bombs. On 8 June 2000 the Öskemen court sentenced 13 people, 11 Russians and 2 Kazakhs, convicted of planning to overthrow the local government and of illegal possession of weapons. The court sentenced the leader of the group, Vladimir Kazimirchuk, to 18-years imprisonment. Kazimirchuk allegedly planned to create an independent nation for ethnic Russians in eastern Kazakhstan.

Alexander Shushannikov, a member of Ust-Kamenogorsk municipal council, criticized the sentencing, saying the men were not sentenced for "concrete actions. Their guilt was just their intentions." He called it a "show trial."

== Almaty airplane bomb ==
An airport worker discovered a bomb in a plant in the baggage compartment of a Boeing 737 that flew from Moscow, Russia to Almaty, Kazakhstan while unloading baggage on 12 May 2005. The bomb, which at the time of discovery ticked and had wires. Security officials destroyed the package without incident.

== Global Initiative to Combat Nuclear Terrorism ==
Representatives from Australia, Britain, Canada, China, France, Germany, Italy, Japan, Kazakhstan, Russia, Turkey, and the United States met in Rabat, Morocco on 30–31 October 2006 to discuss the protection of nuclear materials and the prevention of theft by terrorists. One of the first steps of the Global Initiative to Combat Nuclear Terrorism is to issue a statement of principles. Kazakhstan gave up its nuclear weapons after the fall of the Soviet Union under the Nunn-Lugar Cooperative Threat Reduction program. An anonymous U.S. official said the goal of the initiative is for participating states to "build capacities to prevent the acquisition of sensitive materials by terrorist groups."

== Literature ==
The following extremist literature advocating terrorism has been confiscated in Kazakhstan:

- An Open Letter to French President Jacques Chirac
- Evil Schemes of America
- Who is responsible for Tashkent blasts?

== Cooperation with China ==
Kazakhstan has consistently extradited Uyghur terrorist suspects to China and in 2006 participated in a large-scale, joint counter-terrorism drill.

=== Chinese delegation visit ===
Chinese President Hu Jintao led a 150-person delegation to Kazakhstan on 2 July 2005 after visiting Moscow, Russia for four days. The Chinese Government issued a press release saying the Chinese-Kazakh energy and security "relationship deepens constantly." Upon arriving Hu met with President Nazarbayev in an official ceremony. They discussed anti-terrorism, energy, and transportation.

=== Tian-Shan-1 2006 ===
The governments of China and Kazakhstan held an anti-terror drill, known as the "Tian-Shan-1-2006" drill, from 24–26 August 2006, starting in Almaty, Kazakhstan and ending in Xinjiang, China through the Shanghai Cooperation Organisation. The drill is the first time China and Kazakhstan have held anti-terrorism maneuvers. The Collective Security Treaty Organization held exercises in the Caspian Sea simultaneously.

The simulation lasted for three days and involved Kazakh forces from border patrol, the Interior Ministry, and the Emergency Situations Ministry, and Chinese law enforcement forces and security services. 700 police officials used armed helicopters and anti-riot vehicles to force the 'enemy' into a narrow valley along the border of Kazakhstan and Xinjiang, China after rescuing 'hostages'. About 100 observers from other SCO nation-members attended the exercises. The first day of exercises began in Almaty and ended in Yining, a city in Ili Kazakh Autonomous Prefecture. When officials of Radio Free Europe contacted the Foreign and Defense Ministries of both nations, inquiring about the exercises, Islam Dosmailuly, a spokesman for Kazakhstan's National Security Committee, told them he did not "know if [the exercises] will [take place] or not. I'm waiting for information. If [the information] gets here, we'll certainly comment on it. But, for now, I have no information." Xinhua reported that the policemen practiced freeing hostages.

Some analysts said the simulation practiced securing the Atasu-Alashankou pipeline, which sends petroleum from Kazakhstan to refineries in Xinjiang. Kazakhstan sends about 3.5 million tons through the pipeline annually and wants to increase output to 20 million tons.

Konstantin Syroyezhkin, a senior analyst at Kazakhstan's Strategic Studies and Research Institute, said "there are many common threats and these are [well-known] already. There is drug trafficking, [illegal] immigration, and religious extremism and political extremism. There are a number of threats. And these are counter-terrorism exercises, [against] international terrorism. Why should they not hold them? Look, there's a mess in Afghanistan; there must be some mutual cooperation in that matter. And anyway, it is not the first time they have held such exercises. Last year, or before last year, it was organized as a planned maneuver, there is nothing suspicious about that." Kazakhstan has held joint counter-terrorism exercises with NATO under the Partnership for Peace program and the Collective Security Treaty Organization. Meng Hongwei, Chinese Vice-Minister of Public Security and commander of the Chinese troops for the drill, warned that the "three evil forces" of terrorism, separatism and extremism and increasing cross-border drug trafficking were affecting the region. Vice-Minister Hongwei said, "the exercise will help establish the SCO's active role in maintaining regional security and stability." SCO nation-members plan to hold another series of anti-terrorism exercises in Russia in 2007. Vladimir Boshko, first vice-chairman of the Committee of the National Security of Kazakhstan, said the drill would improve anti-terror cooperation among SCO nation-members.

== Cooperation with India ==
The Kazakh government condemned the 13 December 2001 attack on the Indian Parliament saying terrorism is unjustifiable. President Nazarbayev and Indian Prime Minister Atal Bihari Vajpayee reaffirmed this message by issuing a joint declaration on 12 February 2002, when Nazarbayev visited India for a state visit, stating that "terrorism [can] not be justified in any form, for any cause or for any reason used as an excuse... the fight against terrorism has to be global, comprehensive and sustained for the objective of total elimination of terrorism everywhere." They agreed to establish a bilateral joint working group on counter-terrorism and expressed support for the Karzai administration and an end to terrorism in Afghanistan. During Nazarbayev's five-day visit, the first since 1996, he met with President K. R. Narayanan, Vice President Krishan Kant and opposition leader Sonia Gandhi.

== Cooperation with international bodies ==
=== CICA Declaration on Eliminating Terrorism ===
Officials from member state of the Conference on Interaction and Confidence Building Measures in Asia met in the first CICA conference in Almaty in June 2002. On 4 June they issued a "Declaration on Eliminating Terrorism and Promoting Dialogue among Civilizations." The Declaration condemns all acts of terrorism as "direct violations of human rights" and recognizes that "all religions of the world reject violence and terrorism." It also expresses support for UN Security Council Resolution 1373.

=== Combating money laundering and terrorism financing workshop ===
The Kazakh government participated in a workshop on fighting money laundering and the financing of terrorism, along with officials, including legislators and police officers, from the Global Program against Money Laundering of the United Nations Office for Drug Control and Crime Prevention, the Organization for Security and Cooperation in Europe, Kyrgyzstan, Austria, Canada, Croatia, and the International Monetary Fund in 2002 from 30 September – 1 October in Bishkek, Kyrgyzstan and 2 October and 3 October in Astana, Kazakhstan. The workshop fulfilled part of an "Action Plan" agreed upon in December 2001 in a conference in Bishkek on security in Central Asia.

In Astana the Deputy Chairman of the Committee on National Security of Kazakhstan advocated passing a law prohibiting money laundering in Kazakhstan per the United Nations' goal of banning money laundering in every country by 2003. Participants gave recommendations to Kazakhstan and Kyrgyzstan on changing legislation and bureaucracy to better fight illegal financing practices.

=== International Conference on Peace and Harmony ===
Christian, Jewish, and Muslim leaders met with the President Nazarbayev, Kyrgyz President Kurmanbek Bakiyev, and Tajik President Emomali Rahmonov, and senior government officials from Azerbaijan, Afghanistan and Turkey, in Almaty on 13 February 2003 for the International Conference on Peace and Harmony. President Bush said in a 12 February letter to Nazarbayev, "The United States strongly supports the Conference's objective of fostering peace and stability through dialogue among people of different nationalities and faiths. All peace-loving people share a deep interest in advancing religious liberty and tolerance, stemming hatred, and eliminating the threat of terrorism."

Over 70 Jewish leaders participated, including Malcolm Hoenlein, executive vice chairman, and Mortimer Zuckerman, chairman, of the Conference of Presidents of Major Jewish Organizations. Zuckerman expressed "gratitude to all present for your fight against all forms of terrorism and extremism."

United States Senators Sam Brownback, Orrin Hatch, Mary Landrieu, and representatives Robert Wexler, Gary Ackerman, Henry Waxman, Joseph Pitts and others, signed separate letters of support for the conference, calling it "critical to worldwide efforts to counter extremism." It sent "a strong signal that the present and future course of the Muslim world will not be controlled by those that would propagate hate, fear and murder, such as Al Qaeda, but by those nations and people who respect and promote peace, tolerance and democracy." Participants in the conference established a permanent "Forum for Peace and Stability," with headquarters in Kazakhstan. Nazarbayev said the Forum laid the "foundation for creating a mechanism for permanent dialogue in the name of stability, security and peace in the 21st century. New realities require new approaches to thinking of new principles of solving the problems." President Rakhmonov said, "The basis for the dialogue of civilizations lies in the unity of values preached by all religions. We must not allow attempts to pit civilizations against each other to succeed."

=== United Nations Terrorism Committee conference in Almaty ===
Officials from the United Nations Security Council's Counter-Terrorism Committee met in Almaty from 26–28 January 2005. The officials discussed terrorism, terrorism financing, money laundering, arms trafficking, illicit fund transfers, and fake charities in Central Eurasia. Andrei Denisov, the Russian ambassador to the United Nations, chaired the conference. On 26 January he said, "the reality is that the threat of terrorism cannot be eradicated completely in the near future. It will continue to reproduce itself one way or the other. But nations can and should make every effort to limit the opportunities for this threat to realize itself, and this is what we are doing, and this is what we are going to discuss during our conference." He also said "terrorism has deep roots in Central Asia." President Nazarbayev 's said in his opening statement, "Kazakhstan's national security is closely linked to the security of the Central Asian region. And security in Central Asia should be considered an integral component of security in [Eurasia]. The Central Asian region should be part of a Eurasian security system that is part of a global security system."

Boris Mylnikov, head of the CIS Antiterrorism Center, announced a list of terrorist organizations recognized by the CSTO and SCO. Human Rights Watch released an open letter to the CTC, calling on CTC nations to recognize the importance of respecting human rights while fighting terrorism. Rachel Denber, acting HRW director for Europe and Central Asia, expressed concerns about Human rights in Kazakhstan. HRW opposes the Kazakh government's extradition of Muslims to China because they may be sentenced to death.

== Cooperation with Russia ==
Yury Baluyevsky, First Deputy Defense Minister and Chief of the Russian General Staff, gave a speech to the chiefs of general staffs of Azerbaijan, Armenia, Belarus, Kazakhstan, Kyrgyzstan, Tajikistan, Uzbekistan and Ukraine in February 2006 prior to the fifteenth anniversary of the creation of the Commonwealth of Independent States. He called on them to cooperate in fighting against "terrorism, cross-border crime and the drug mafia." The governments of Georgia, Moldova and Turkmenistan chose to not send representatives to the meeting.

At the same time Kazakhstan has extradited terrorist suspects to Russia. FSB and KNB agents caught Vakha Izmailov, suspected of involvement in the Beslan school attack and of other attacks in Ingushetia, in a joint operation in Kazakhstan. The Kazakh KNB then transferred him to the Russian FSB.

== Cooperation with Singapore ==
Oral Mukhamedzhanov, Speaker of Kazakhstan's Lower House of Parliament, met with Singaporean President Sellapan Ramanathan on 31 October 2006. They discussed international terrorism and increasing cooperation between the two nations in counter-terrorism. Speaker Mukhamedzhanov visited Singapore after Singaporean Parliament Speaker Abdullah Tarmugi invited him.

== Cooperation with the United Arab Emirates ==
Askar Musinov, Kazakhstan's ambassador to the United Arab Emirates, met with Sayf Bin-Zayid al Nuhayyan, the Interior Minister of the UAE, on 29 November 2006. They discussed cooperation in fighting organized crime, drug trafficking, extradition of suspects, and terrorism.

== Cooperation with the United States ==
Cooperation with the United States in regional counter-terrorism and the U.S.-led War in Iraq elicited praise from Secretary of Defense Donald Rumsfeld, Senator Conrad Burns, Congressman Denny Rehberg, and other U.S. government officials.

=== Response to the 11 September 2001 attacks ===
After the 11 September 2001 attacks, Kazakh President Nursultan Nazarbayev sent a message to United States President George W. Bush expressing "indignation about terrorist acts that resulted in loss of numerous lives." The "civilized community must unite and take effective measures to fight international terrorism. All the Kazakhstan people sympathize with the American people in their grief and mourn aver the tragedy."

Central Intelligence Agency officials met with Kazakhstan Security Council officials "to take all the necessary measures to protect U.S. citizens staying in Kazakhstan" in September 2001 following the attacks. KNB Chairman Marat Tazhin pledged the government would "[adopt] tougher measures to deport illegal migrants [in] Kazakhstan."

According to the Center for Defense Information, the Kazakh government has been "extremely supportive [of] the U.S.-led war against terrorism." The government offered the use of a major airport for Operation Enduring Freedom. Over 800 U.S. flights over Kazakh territory were approved and went ahead. CDI's profile of Kazakhstan credits security forces for "step[ing] up efforts to protect U.S. government facilities and oil facilities with U.S. private investment" and pledging to "freeze the assets of terrorists identified on the U.S. designated terrorist asset-freeze list." The U.S. officially gave the Kazakh government USD $52,893,000 million in 2002, $47 million in 2003, and $36.2 million in 2004. In addition, U.S. Government agencies spent $92 million in assistance programs in Kazakhstan in 2003.

Three Kazakh citizens, Yaqub Abahanov, Abdulrahim Kerimbakiev, and Abdallah Tohtasinovich Magrupov, all born in Semey, Kazakhstan, are held in extrajudicial detention in the United States' Guantanamo Bay detainment camp, in Cuba for alleged ties to the Taliban. Additionally, Uzbek citizen and Guantánamo prisoner Ilkham Turdbyavich Batayev's birthplace is Abaye, Kazakhstan.

In a speech given on 19 December 2001 at the Euro-Atlantic Partnership Council during the Defence Ministers session, Mukhtar Altynbayev, the Kazakh Minister of Defense and General of the Kazakh Army, said the attacks "demonstrated that international terrorism has no borders and represents a threat to all the world community." He reaffirmed Kazakhstan's will to fight terrorism and the need to "punish" terrorists and their sponsors. Addressing the possibility, raised by North Atlantic Treaty Organization experts, of using Kazakh airfields for counterterrorist operations, he said there were "other practical issues under consideration," but that Kazakhstan would commit to providing humanitarian assistance to Afghans.

=== United States air bases ===
In 2002 a Chinese diplomat accused the United States Government of trying to secure a defunct air base, originally used by the Soviet Union specifically for theoretical military operations against China, near Semey in eastern Kazakhstan. A high-ranking Kazakh Defense Ministry official said the U.S. Government, as part of its anti-terrorism operations in Central Asia, had requested the use of military bases in Taraz and Taldykorgan. Ibragim Alibekov, a journalist for Radio Free Europe, characterized President Nursultan Nazarbayev's support for the "anti-terrorism campaign" as cautious and "hesitant on the implementation of concrete cooperation measures." However, the National Coalition Supporting Soviet Jewry applauds Kazakhstan for playing "a vital role in U.S.-led efforts to combat international terrorism." President Bush called Kazakhstan a "strategic partner of the United States in Central Asia" and said the United States wanted to expand anti-terrorism cooperation.

Alleged U.S. attempts to acquire bases were criticized by Russian Defense Minister Sergei Ivanov, who said such actions were unjustifiable, and Russian State Duma Speaker Gennady Seleznev.

An anonymous expert within the Kazakh Defense Ministry said that "of all the assistance [Kazakhstan] can offer towards military counter-terrorism operations—allowing use of our airfields, opening air corridors and sharing intelligence information—the last would be the least risky for Kazakhstan. Allowing the use of airfields means going into direct confrontation with the Taliban, and that is not a good scenario in our situation." An anonymous, high-ranking Foreign Ministry official said "the influx of refugees" created by U.S. airstrikes in Afghanistan "is one problem, but the greater problem is that terrorists and militants might flee northward disguised as civilians." Professor Murat Abdirov, director of the International Relations Institute of Eurasian University, said, "Kazakhstan cannot stay away from the international anti-terrorism coalition, but we should proceed with caution."

The Kazakh government did offer the use of a major airport for military operations, but three years later, with U.S. military operations against the Taliban insurgency in Afghanistan continuing, General John Abizaid, head of U.S. Central Command, said on 3 May 2005 that the United States did not "expect to open a military base in Kazakhstan unless a tense situation emerges in the region, under which the Kazakh government requests the U.S. armed forces to do so."

== Cooperation with Uzbekistan ==
While the Uzbek government complained in 2004 that Islamic terrorists were training in southern Kazakhstan, an allegation the Kazakh government denied, cooperation between the two countries has been strong as both states face a common threat.

=== Andijan massacre ===
Nazarbayev, while on a state visit to Uzbekistan, told Uzbek President Islam Karimov that the Uzbek government's actions in quelling unrest in the Uzbek city of Andijan on 12 and 13 May 2005 helped "protect the peace of 26 million Uzbekistanis. A different outcome would have destabilized the region today." He said that because terrorists had taken over government buildings and prisons, Karimov could not respond to the unrest differently, and other governments had responded similarly in the past. The Uzbek government attributed the unrest to Islamic extremist groups recognized as terrorist organizations in Uzbekistan. The Uzbek government estimated 187 people, made up of 94 terrorists, 60 civilians, 31 policemen, and two others died, and 76 terrorists were injured. Human rights groups dispute the government's estimate, accusing Uzbek security forces of killing about 700 civilians.

==== Extradition of terrorist suspects ====
On 5 July 2005 Human Rights Watch called upon the Kazakh government to refrain from handing over Lutfullo Shamsudinov, the Andijan representative for the Human Rights Society of Uzbekistan, then held in Almaty, to the Uzbek government. The Office of the United Nations High Commissioner for Refugees had given Shamsudinov refugee status and planned to resettle him when Kazakh authorities detained him on 4 July. Earlier that day President Karimov visited Kazakhstan along with other regional nations' representatives as part of a Shanghai Cooperation Organisation meeting. The Uzbek government requested Shamsudinov's extradition, charging him with five criminal charges including premeditated murder. Holly Cartner, executive director of the Europe and Central Asia division of Human Rights Watch, said, "Kazakhstan should step forward and protect this brave man. Instead of that, the authorities seem ready to hand over a refugee to be tortured, in blatant violation of international law." In response to statements made by a representative for the Almaty city prosecutor's office, in which the representative called Shamsudinov a terrorist, Cartner said, "The terrorist accusation is a perversion of international concerns about terrorism and an attempt to block international support for Shamsudinov. In reality, he is someone who worked tirelessly towards the rule of law in Uzbekistan." Russia also deported an asylum seeker to Uzbekistan, Rustam Muminov, who Uzbek authorities accuse of involvement in the Andijan unrest and membership in a religious extremist organization, and Kyrgyzstan deported five Andijan-refugees—Jahongir Maqsudov, Yoqub Toshboev, Odiljon Rahimov, Rasuljon Pirmatov, and Fayoz Tojihalilov—to Uzbekistan in early August 2006.

In March 1998 the Uzbek government accused Obidkhon Qori Nazarov, an Imam, of religious extremism, terrorism, and membership in the Islamic Movement of Uzbekistan. Nazarov fled to Kazakhstan, leaving behind his wife, son, and three brothers, all of whom have been imprisoned or disappeared, though his wife has been released.

John MacLeod, a senior editor for the Institute for War and Peace Reporting who met Nazarov in 1996, disputed the charges. He said Nazarov is "really a part of an earlier phase of events in Uzbekistan when the state religion was entirely in confrontation with independent Imams and Mullahs such as Obidkhon and a number of others." Rao said, "If we had found him associated with terrorism or extremism we would have excluded him. We believe that he is a refugee needing an international protection. That's how we provided him the refugee status and protection."

The UNHCR gave Nazarov refugee status when he contacted them in November 2006. Nazarov, along with some members of his family, were flown out of Kazakhstan to a secret location in Western Europe on 16 March 2006. Rao said, "The credit has to be given to the Kazakh authorities. Once we recognized [Nazarov] as a refugee, we informed them that he is under the protection of [the] UNHCR. So Kazakh authorities have honored their ... national obligation and let him stay in the country until the UNHCR organized the third-country settlement. And today, when he wanted to depart, the authorities let him leave the country."

=== Security fence ===
Kazakh border officials began building a 45-kilometre-long (28 mi) fence on the border with Uzbekistan on 19 October 2006. The New York Times reported that the fence will be "eight-foot-high [with] barbed-wire" and searchlights "along heavily populated towns and cities on the southern ridge" where drug smugglers operate. The area is a "flash point in a larger regional struggle against Islamic militants."

The governments of Kazakhstan and Uzbekistan first created national border guard forces in 1992 and January 1998 respectively, far earlier than other post-Soviet Union nations. The Kazakh government raised the force in status, ending the State Security Committee's control until the Committee regained control in 1998.

Other Central Asian nations have had border disputes in the past. Turkmenistan and Uzbekistan had serious "issues" regarding their mutual border until May 2004. The Turkmen Foreign Ministry released a statement on 31 May saying disputes had been resolved.

Erik Roslyakov, second in command of Kazakhstan's southern border, said the fence will cover the Sariaghash and Maktaaral districts. Larisa Dmitriyuk, spokeswoman for Kazakhstan's border administration, said the border patrol's "task will now be easier. We will be in a position to use our weapons, as it is the rule when one wants to catch [trespassers]."

In addition to tightening security, Bruce Pannier of Payvand noted increased military spending to strengthen Kazakhstan's border with Uzbekistan and Kyrgyzstan.

== Criticism ==
Nezavisimaya Gazeta interviewed Vyacheslav Kasymov, director of the executive committee of the Regional Anti-terrorist Center of the Shanghai Cooperation Organisation, and published the interview on 7 February. In the interview Kasymov accused the Kazakh government of giving refuge to terrorist organizations, specifically Saudi Binladin Group, which operated in Astana. In November 2004 the Supreme Court ruled against the company's claim to 7 square kilometres of land in Astana. The Kazakh Foreign Ministry issued a statement two days later, on 9 February, calling Kasymov's statements "absolutely incompatible with the status of a head of the structure of a large international organization and casts a shadow of doubt on the reputation and position of the SCO in the contemporary world." The statement said the Kazakh government has signed 12 UN anti-terrorist conventions. The Kazakh Foreign Ministry has since characterized Kasymov's comments as "inappropriate" and "totally deprived of the spirit of the basic documents of [the Shanghai Cooperation Organisation]" because "There weren't and there are not any terrorists' bases or camps on the soil of Kazakhstan."

The United Nations High Commissioner for Refugees and Human Rights Watch have criticized the Nazarbayev administration's policy of transferring terrorist suspects to neighboring countries, specifically Uzbekistan, where HRW says suspects face torture.

The strongest criticism of the Nazarbayev administration's counter-terrorism operations comes from Harout Semerdjian of the University of California, Los Angeles. Semerdjian accuses the government of engaging in "semi-state terrorism" through unlawful arrests of journalists, arson, and other attacks on the press. The U.S. embassy criticized an act of arson in Kazakhstan in May 2002.

== See also ==
- Islamic terrorism
- September 11, 2001 attacks
- Manas Air Base
- Karshi-Khanabad
- Wäisi movement
